= Junior Johnson & Associates =

NASCAR auto racing organization

- Owner(s): Junior Johnson; Warner Hodgdon (1982–1985)
- Base: Ronda, North Carolina, United States
- Series: NASCAR Winston Cup Series
- Race drivers: Bobby Isaac; Darel Dieringer; A. J. Foyt; Fred Lorenzen; LeeRoy Yarbrough; Cale Yarborough; Bobby Allison; Darrell Waltrip; Neil Bonnett; Terry Labonte; Geoff Bodine; Bill Elliott; Sterling Marlin; Elton Sawyer; Jimmy Spencer; Earl Ross
- Manufacturer: Buick, Chevrolet, Ford
- Opened: 1965
- Closed: 1996

Career
- Drivers' Championships: 6 (1976, 1977, 1978, 1981, 1982, 1985)
- Race victories: 132

Junior Johnson & Associates (formerly Johnson Hodgdon Racing) was a NASCAR team that ran in the Winston Cup Series from 1953 to 1995. The team was run by former driver Junior Johnson and was best known for fielding cars for legendary talents such as Cale Yarborough, Darrell Waltrip, Neil Bonnett, Terry Labonte, Bill Elliott, Geoffrey Bodine, and Sterling Marlin.

== History ==
Johnson's team started out in 1953 with him driving a No. 75 Oldsmobile at the Southern 500. The team was inactive for nearly a decade, but returned in the 1960s. Johnson scored 13 wins in 1965, and A. J. Foyt, Bobby Issac, Gordon Johncock, and Curtis Turner drove for Johnson the following year with no wins. Darel Dieringer scored 6 poles and one win at North Wilkesboro Speedway. LeeRoy Yarbrough joined Johnson in 1968, starting slowly but winning at Atlanta and Trenton. 1969 would be far more successful, as Yarbrough not only won that year's Daytona 500, but winning the Rebel 400 and the World 600, becoming the first driver to win NASCAR's "Triple Crown". Yarbrough added 4 more wins to his season total. With the manufacturer withdrawal in 1970, Johnson scaled back operations, fielding the No. 98 for one race drives for Donnie Allison at North Wilkesboro, Fred Lorenzen at Darlington, and David Pearson at Martinsville. Yarbrough returned later that year, winning at Charlotte. Yarbrough and Johnson entered only 4 events the following year. He did not field a car again until 1974, in the meantime he was the head mechanic at Richard Howard's team, known for running the 12 Coca-Cola car that Bobby Allison drove for a number of years.

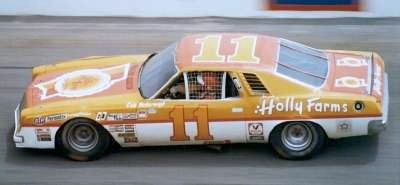
Number 11 car driven by Cale Yarborough in 1976

In 1974, Johnson's team was revived when Canadian rookie Earl Ross left Allan Brooke's operation. He was later joined by Cale Yarborough. Ross would win at Martinsville and claim ROTY honors, while Yarborough scored 4 wins. Ross left Johnson's team after 1974, with Yarborough staying on. Tyson Foods replaced Carling as primary sponsor in 1975, and Yarborough would score three consecutive championships with Johnson from 1976 to 1978. Cale nearly won the 1979 Daytona 500, but was involved in a confrontation between himself and the Allison brothers on the final lap. After 1980, Cale wanted to cut back on his schedule to spend time with his family so he and Junior parted ways after that year. Cale recommended Darrell Waltrip, who came over from DiGard Motorsports with Mountain Dew, along with crew chief Tim Brewer. Johnson and Waltrip grabbed 12 victories and the 1981 championship. After Brewer moved on to other ventures, jackman Jeff Hammond stepped up to crew chief, grabbing 12 more wins and holding off Bobby Allison for the 1982 Championship. Additionally, Johnson sold 50% of his business to California investor Warner W. Hodgdon in 1982, forming Johnson Hodgdon Racing until 1985.

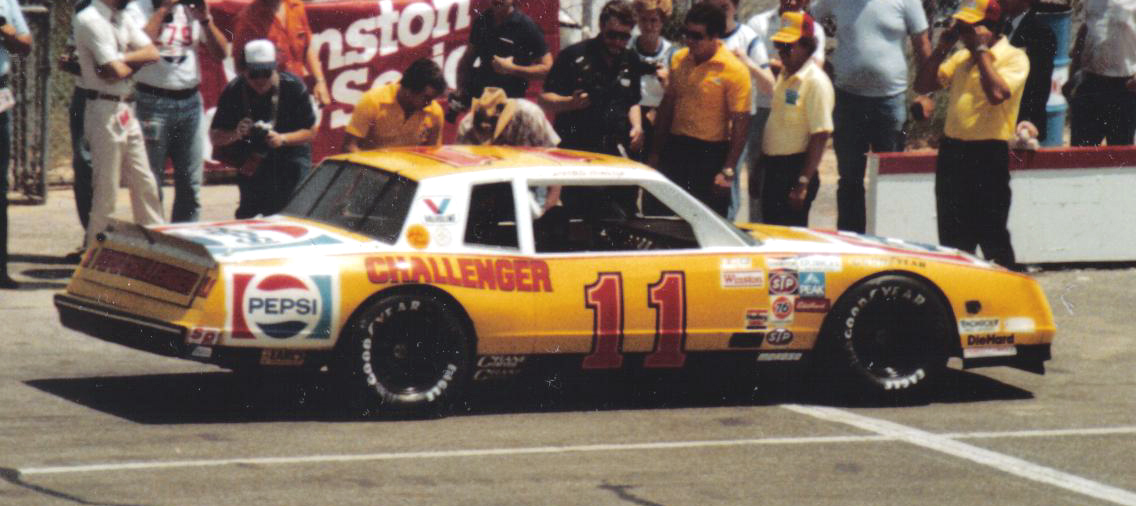
Darrell Waltrip's No. 11 in 1983

For 1983, the team changed sponsors to Pepsi. Waltrip did not start off the season well, having a hard crash at the Daytona 500. Waltrip and Allison once again dueled for the Winston Cup championship. Waltrip got up to 2nd in points by Michigan, and despite grabbing wins at Bristol and North Wilkesboro late in the season, was unable to catch Allison and DiGard for the championship.

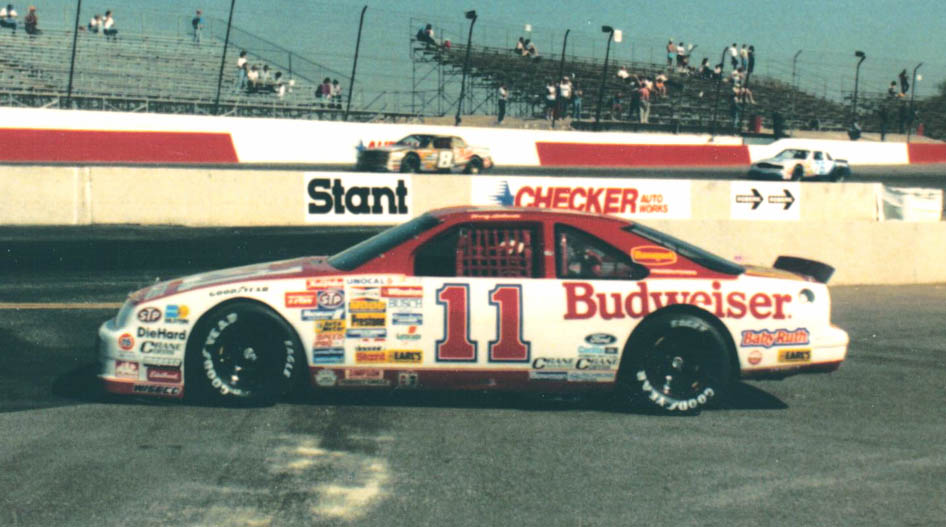
Terry Labonte driving the No. 11 in 1989

Pepsi left Johnson's team after the 1983 season, and he agreed to terms with Anheuser-Busch to carry its Budweiser brand on his cars. Johnson also revived his second team, signing Neil Bonnett away from RahMoc Enterprises to pilot car #12 alongside Waltrip in the #11 The duo were a dominant force, scoring 16 wins between 1984 and 1986, with Darrell winning the 1985 championship.

However, after 1986 the team underwent a significant overhaul. Bonnett's team was disbanded after the season and he left to return to his former ride at RahMoc. Waltrip, meanwhile, had been approached by Rick Hendrick to join his team and was also said to be uncomfortable with his association with a beer company as sponsor; he approached Johnson with a request for a raise, knowing full well that was against Johnson's rules and would result in his termination.

Back to a single car operation, Johnson agreed to terms with 1984 series champion Terry Labonte to drive the 11, with Tim Brewer returning as crew chief to replace the departed Jeff Hammond, who followed Waltrip to his new team. Labonte managed a pair of top five points finishes in his first two seasons with one win each in 1987 and 1988. Following the 1988 season, Johnson opted to begin fielding Fords instead of Chevrolets, and Labonte won twice in 1989. He slipped back to tenth in the standings, however, and announced he was departing for the Precision Products Racing team for the 1990 season after planning to run his own independent team.

Initially, Johnson looked to replace Labonte with Alan Kulwicki, who at the time was driving the #7 Zerex Ford as an owner-driver. Kulwicki declined the offer, as he was not interested in driving for anyone but himself. Johnson then set his sights on Hendrick’s Geoff Bodine, who had been driving for the team since its 1984 inception, and signed him to pilot the #11. Bodine would go on to record two victories in 1990 and finish in what would be his career best third place in the points standings.

Johnson decided once again to bring back his second car for 1991, renumbered as the #22. Again, his primary target was Alan Kulwicki. As it happened, Kulwicki had just lost his sponsor when Zerex’s parent company Valvoline opted to leave after the 1990 season despite his top ten finish in the points. But as he had in 1990, and despite receiving a $1 million offer, Kulwicki again turned Johnson down to remain an owner-driver. Angry over being rejected by Kulwicki twice, Johnson retaliated by convincing Kraft General Foods, with whom Kulwicki had been negotiating with to carry its Maxwell House coffee brand on his car, to instead give the sponsorship to him. He then hired Sterling Marlin to drive the #22.

1991 was a rather mixed season for the Johnson organization. Bodine managed a victory but missed two races following an injury suffered in a practice crash for The Winston, finishing fourteenth in the final standings. Although Marlin did not win a race, he recorded which was to that point his best ever final standings position with a seventh place finish. Bodine would not return following the season, instead taking over the #15 Ford at Bud Moore Engineering.

That offseason, Johnson scored a major coup when he was able to sign Bill Elliott to drive the #11. The relationship scored dividends almost immediately, as Elliott won four of the first five races of the 1992 season and looked strong throughout as he tried to win his second Winston Cup after previously doing so in 1988. Despite holding a significant lead late in the season, a series of poor finishes cost Elliott his points lead to Davey Allison. Despite this, entering the season finale at Atlanta Elliott was third in the standings behind Allison and the driver who spurned Johnson twice, Alan Kulwicki. Misfortune would indeed befall both drivers, as Kulwicki suffered a gearbox failure and Allison was caught up in an accident that affected his car's handling. Elliott was running strong, and after Allison was collected in a second accident that caused severe damage to his vehicle, he had his best chance to win the championship. Kulwicki, however, was running just as well as Elliott despite his transmission issue. It came down to an error in calculation on pit road as Brewer called Elliott to pit road a lap too late for a fuel stop, as the lapse in judgement cost Elliott the crucial five bonus points he would have gotten for leading the most laps; those points instead went to Kulwicki, who finished the race second behind Elliott and won the championship.

More upheaval followed. Johnson fired Brewer immediately after the race, leaving the #11 needing a crew chief. In the offseason Marlin, who finished tenth in the standings, left the team to take over the #8 Stavola Brothers Racing Ford. Maxwell House also left the team, as the sponsor and crew chief Brewer moved over to Bill Davis Racing's new Cup team with rookie Bobby Labonte. Johnson signed McDonald's to sponsor his second team, giving the #22 to Davis and changing the number of his car to #27. Hut Stricklin was signed to drive the #27. For the first time in the modern era of NASCAR, Johnson failed to record a win as team owner. Elliott did manage to finish eighth in the standings, but Stricklin struggled after posting a fourth place finish in the Daytona 500 and was released after finishing 24th.

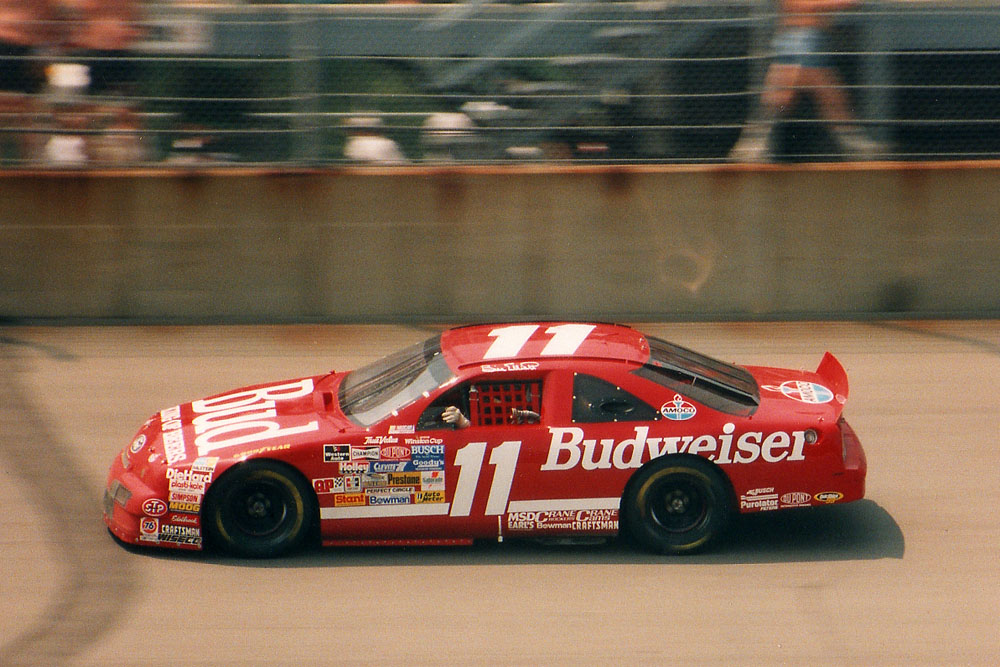
Bill Elliott in 1994

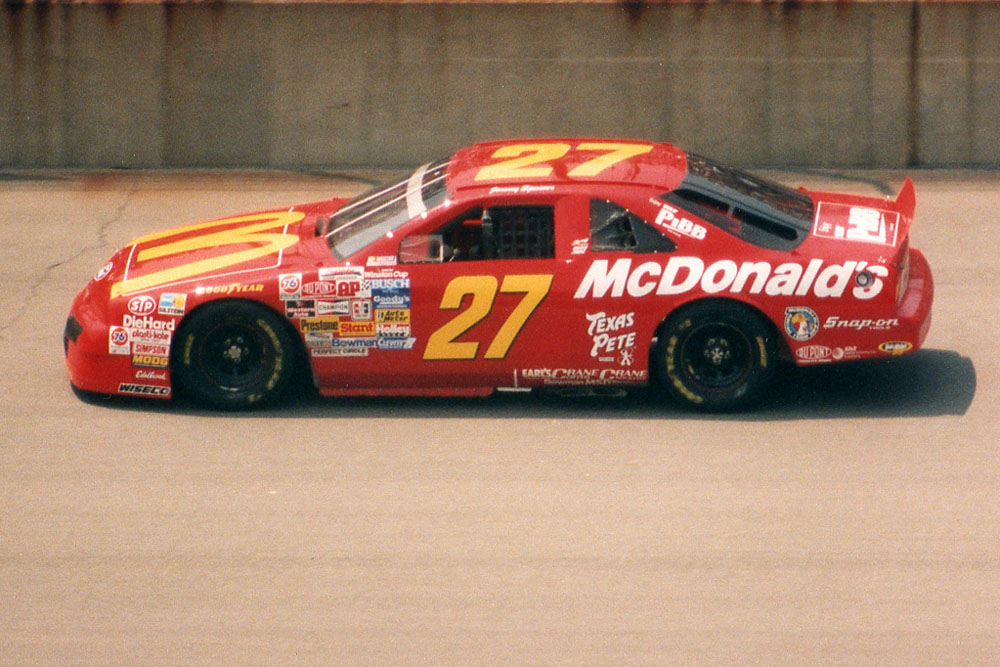
Jimmy Spencer driving the No. 27 at Michigan in 1994

For 1994, Jimmy Spencer was signed away from Bobby Allison's team where he had just finished a season with a career best twelfth place points finish. Spencer took over the #27 and took the car to victory lane twice, once at Talladega and the other time at Daytona in the Pepsi 400. Despite that, he only recorded one other top ten finish, had ten finishes of 35th or worse, did not qualify for the night race at Bristol, and was subbed out for ringer Tommy Kendall at Watkins Glen. The end result was a 27th place finish.

Elliott, meanwhile, brought the #11 back to victory lane with a victory in the Southern 500. He finished with twelve top tens, six of which were top fives, and ensured another top ten finish in the final standings for Johnson's flagship car. It would also be the last time team would do this.

In the 1994 offseason, Elliott decided to form his own team, taking the McDonald's sponsorship with him. Spencer was not retained despite taking the #27 to victory lane twice, and he moved over to Travis Carter's team for 1995. The team also lost its longtime backer Budweiser, as Anheuser-Busch signed on to sponsor Ken Schrader at Hendrick Motorsports. Johnson hired Brett Bodine away from King Racing to take over the #11 and signed Lowe's to sponsor the team. The #27 team signed Loy Allen, Jr. to drive the car and he brought his Hooters sponsorship from his previous team, TriStar Motorsports.

In what would prove to be the final season for Johnson's team, they failed to visit victory lane. Bodine managed two top ten finishes, one at North Wilkesboro and the other at Pocono, and brought the #11 home in twentieth place in the final standings. The #27 team, meanwhile, struggled immensely. Allen was released after failing to qualify at the spring races at Atlanta and Bristol, while Jeff Purvis failed to qualify at North Wilkesboro. In all, five drivers attempted races in the car with Elton Sawyer running the majority of the season and recording the team's best finish of fourteenth at Talladega. Greg Sacks and Jimmy Horton each ran one event, with Sacks finishing seventeen at Daytona in July and Horton finishing 34th at Pocono. The #27 finished 37th in the owner points.

== Sale ==
Johnson had largely kept out of the day to day operations of the team after 1994, choosing instead to let Brett Bodine run the operation on a lease basis. After 1995, Bodine opted to purchase the #11 outright and began running it under the Brett Bodine Racing banner. Bodine retained the Lowe's sponsorship, but after losing it to Richard Childress Racing he struggled to find consistent sponsorship and eventually he shut the operation down and retired from driving in 2003.

The #27 team was sold to attorney David Blair, who formed David Blair Motorsports with Elton Sawyer continuing as his driver. However, Blair could never find sponsorship and shut the team down after the 1998 season. The remains of the team were sold to Travis Carter, who renumbered the car to #66 and fielded it for Darrell Waltrip for the last two seasons of his full-time racing career. Travis Carter would run the team in partnership with Carl Haas until 2003, the same year Brett Bodine Racing ceased to exist.

== Team statistics (modern era) ==
=== Car No. 11 results ===
NASCAR Winston Cup Series results
Year	Driver	No.	Make	1	2	3	4	5	6	7	8	9	10	11	12	13	14	15	16	17	18	19	20	21	22	23	24	25	26	27	28	29	30	31	Owners	Pts
1972	Bobby Allison	12	Chevy	RSD; 2*	DAY; 16	RCH; 2*	ONT; 2	CAR; 27*	ATL; 1*	BRI; 1*	DAR; 7	NWS; 2	MAR; 2	TAL; 45	CLT; 2*	DOV; 1*	MCH; 2	RSD; 6	TWS; 2	DAY; 3	BRI; 1*	TRN; 1	ATL; 1	TAL; 3	MCH; 2	NSV; 1*	DAR; 1*	RCH; 2	DOV; 20	MAR; 2*	NWS; 2*	CLT; 1*	CAR; 1*	TWS; 4	2nd	8573.5
1973	Cale Yarborough	11	Chevy	RSD; 24	DAY; 22	RCH; 3	CAR; 2	BRI; 1*	ATL; 5	NWS; 6	DAR; 19	MAR; 2*	TAL; 41	NSV; 1*	CLT; 3	DOV; 2	TWS; 4	RSD; 24	MCH; 6	DAY; 36	BRI; 19	ATL; 2	TAL; 6	NSV; 14*	DAR; 1*	RCH; 2	DOV; 25	NWS; 3	MAR; 2*	CLT; 1*	CAR; 3				2nd	7106.65
1974	Cale Yarborough	11	Chevy	RSD; 1*	DAY; 2	RCH; 3	CAR; 2	BRI; 1*	ATL; 1	DAR; 5	NWS; 2	MAR; 1*	TAL; 9	NSV; 14*	DOV; 1*	CLT; 11	RSD; 1*	MCH; 27	DAY; 3	BRI; 1*	NSV; 1	ATL; 14	POC; 3	TAL; 4	MCH; 3	DAR; 1*	RCH; 21	DOV; 28	NWS; 1*	MAR; 11*	CLT; 23	CAR; 2*	ONT; 3		2nd	4470.3
1975	Cale Yarborough	11	Chevy	RSD	DAY; 3	RCH	CAR; 1*	BRI; 20	ATL; 22	NWS; 2	DAR; 36	MAR; 3	TAL; 40	NSV; 14*	DOV; 27	CLT; 2	RSD	MCH; 4	DAY; 26	NSV; 1*	POC; 35	TAL; 41	MCH; 3	DAR; 19	DOV; 4	NWS; 2	MAR; 19*	CLT; 19	RCH; 26	CAR; 1*	BRI; 20	ATL; 5	ONT; 4		9th	3295
1976	Cale Yarborough	11	Chevy	RSD; 2	DAY; 42	CAR; 3	RCH; 4	BRI; 1*	ATL; 3*	NWS; 1*	DAR; 25	MAR; 2	TAL; 2	NSV; 1*	DOV; 27*	CLT; 3	RSD; 7*	MCH; 2*	DAY; 1*	NSV; 5	POC; 25	TAL; 26	MCH; 2*	BRI; 1*	DAR; 23	RCH; 1*	DOV; 1*	MAR; 1*	NWS; 1*	CLT; 2	CAR; 5	ATL; 4	ONT; 23		1st	4644
1977	Cale Yarborough	11	Chevy	RSD; 2*	DAY; 1*	RCH; 1*	CAR; 6	ATL; 3*	NWS; 1*	DAR; 16	BRI; 1*	MAR; 1*	TAL; 2	NSV; 2*	DOV; 1	CLT; 24	RSD; 3	MCH; 1*	DAY; 23	NSV; 4	POC; 6	TAL; 2	MCH; 5*	BRI; 1*	DAR; 5	RCH; 4	DOV; 3	MAR; 1*	NWS; 2	CLT; 2	CAR; 4	ATL; 5	ONT; 3		1st	5000
1978	Cale Yarborough	11	Olds	RSD; 1*	DAY; 2	RCH; 3	CAR; 18	ATL; 4	BRI; 4	DAR; 15*	NWS; 26	MAR; 16	TAL; 1*	DOV; 2	CLT; 4	NSV; 1*	RSD; 5*	MCH; 1	DAY; 2	NSV; 1*	POC; 26	TAL; 4*	MCH; 2*	BRI; 1*	DAR; 1*	RCH; 4	DOV; 2	MAR; 1*	NWS; 1	CLT; 22	CAR; 1*	ATL; 8	ONT; 2		1st	4841
1979	Cale Yarborough	11	Olds	RSD; 3	DAY; 5	CAR; 18	RCH; 1	ATL; 4	NWS; 9	BRI; 24	DAR; 6	MAR; 11	TAL; 33	NSV; 1		CLT; 4			MCH; 3	DAY; 20			TAL; 24				RCH; 5		MAR; 8		NWS; 20		ATL; 3*	ONT; 3	4th	4604
1979	Cale Yarborough	11	Chevy												DOV; 2*		TWS; 4	RSD; 4*			NSV; 2	POC; 1		MCH; 17	BRI; 5	DAR; 19		DOV; 3*		CLT; 1		CAR; 3			4th	4604
1980	Cale Yarborough	11	Chevy	RSD; 23		RCH; 25		ATL; 8*	BRI; 5	DAR; 12	NWS; 4	MAR; 4		NSV; 3*	DOV; 16*	CLT; 17	TWS; 1*	RSD; 4	MCH; 2		NSV; 2*	POC; 3		MCH; 1	BRI; 1*	DAR; 29		DOV; 4	NWS; 10		CLT; 2	CAR; 1*	ATL; 1*	ONT; 3	2nd	4642
1980	Cale Yarborough	11	Olds		DAY; 19		CAR; 1*						TAL; 6							DAY; 40			TAL; 2				RCH; 26			MAR; 3					2nd	4642
1981	Darrell Waltrip	11	Chevy	RSD; 17																															1st	4880
1981	Darrell Waltrip	11	Buick		DAY; 36	RCH; 1*	CAR; 1	ATL; 36	BRI; 1*	NWS; 3	DAR; 1*	MAR; 26	TAL; 3	NSV; 2	DOV; 12	CLT; 9	TWS; 30	RSD; 1*	MCH; 7*	DAY; 10	NSV; 1*	POC; 1*	TAL; 2	MCH; 2	BRI; 1*	DAR; 2	RCH; 3*	DOV; 2	MAR; 1	NWS; 1*	CLT; 1	CAR; 1*	ATL; 2	RSD; 6	1st	4880
1982	Darrell Waltrip	11	Buick	DAY; 20	RCH; 27	BRI; 1*	ATL; 1	CAR; 7*	DAR; 23	NWS; 1*	MAR; 5	TAL; 1	NSV; 1*	DOV; 15	CLT; 22	POC; 13	RSD; 32	MCH; 2	DAY; 36	NSV; 1*	POC; 6	TAL; 1*	MCH; 7	BRI; 1	DAR; 24	RCH; 3	DOV; 1*	NWS; 1*	CLT; 14	MAR; 1*	CAR; 1	ATL; 3	RSD; 3		1st	4489
1983	Darrell Waltrip	11	Chevy	DAY; 36	RCH; 29	CAR; 3	ATL; 40	DAR; 2	NWS; 1*	MAR; 1*	TAL; 33	NSV; 1*	DOV; 2	BRI; 1*	CLT; 4	RSD; 7	POC; 2	MCH; 4	DAY; 20	NSV; 2	POC; 2	TAL; 2	MCH; 2	BRI; 1*	DAR; 3	RCH; 3	DOV; 5	MAR; 3	NWS; 1*	CLT; 2	CAR; 5	ATL; 9	RSD; 6*		2nd	4620
1984	Darrell Waltrip	11	Chevy	DAY; 3	RCH; 2*	CAR; 10	ATL; 10	BRI; 1*	NWS; 6	DAR; 1*	MAR; 3	TAL; 38	NSV; 1	DOV; 6	CLT; 26	RSD; 11	POC; 6	MCH; 3	DAY; 31	NSV; 2	POC; 22	TAL; 6	MCH; 1	BRI; 21*	DAR; 40	RCH; 1*	DOV; 11	MAR; 1*	CLT; 27	NWS; 1*	CAR; 4	ATL; 6	RSD; 34		5th	4230
1985	Darrell Waltrip	11	Chevy	DAY; 3	RCH; 3*	CAR; 18	ATL; 16	BRI; 23	DAR; 2	NWS; 2	MAR; 23	TAL; 24	DOV; 5	CLT; 1	RSD; 8	POC; 3	MCH; 2	DAY; 3	POC; 3	TAL; 9	MCH; 2	BRI; 4*	DAR; 17	RCH; 1	DOV; 2	MAR; 2	NWS; 14	CLT; 4	CAR; 1	ATL; 3	RSD; 7				1st	4292
1986	Darrell Waltrip	11	Chevy	DAY; 3	RCH; 5	CAR; 5	ATL; 4	BRI; 3	DAR; 2	NWS; 4	MAR; 27	TAL; 34	DOV; 5	CLT; 5	RSD; 1	POC; 40	MCH; 5	DAY; 4	POC; 4	TAL; 25	GLN; 2	MCH; 3	BRI; 1*	DAR; 5	RCH; 29	DOV; 14	MAR; 4	NWS; 1	CLT; 9	CAR; 3	ATL; 39	RSD; 4			2nd	4180
1987	Terry Labonte	11	Chevy	DAY; 18	CAR; 8	RCH; 5	ATL; 4	DAR; 32	NWS; 8	BRI; 9	MAR; 5	TAL; 2	CLT; 6	DOV; 3	POC; 37	RSD; 4	MCH; 28	DAY; 10	POC; 6	TAL; 6	GLN; 2	MCH; 33	BRI; 4	DAR; 5	RCH; 8	DOV; 32	MAR; 3	NWS; 1*	CLT; 4	CAR; 4	RSD; 8	ATL; 28			3rd	4007
1988	Terry Labonte	11	Chevy	DAY; 5	RCH; 9	CAR; 31	ATL; 4	DAR; 23	BRI; 16	NWS; 1	MAR; 4	TAL; 4	CLT; 9	DOV; 12	RSD; 2	POC; 32	MCH; 3	DAY; 19	POC; 9	TAL; 14	GLN; 18	MCH; 13	BRI; 22	DAR; 8	RCH; 3	DOV; 18	MAR; 7	CLT; 10	NWS; 4	CAR; 3	PHO; 2	ATL; 8			4th	4007
1989	Terry Labonte	11	Ford	DAY; 9	CAR; 18	ATL; 36	RCH; 30	DAR; 18	BRI; 24	NWS; 5	MAR; 5	TAL; 2	CLT; 39	DOV; 4	SON; 15	POC; 1	MCH; 14	DAY; 6	POC; 13	TAL; 1	GLN; 14	MCH; 40	BRI; 5	DAR; 33	RCH; 12	DOV; 14	MAR; 11	CLT; 11	NWS; 3	CAR; 14	PHO; 2	ATL; 40			10th	3569
1990	Geoff Bodine	11	Ford	DAY; 9	RCH; 33	CAR; 2	ATL; 7	DAR; 4*	BRI; 24	NWS; 8	MAR; 1*	TAL; 24	CLT; 10	DOV; 15	SON; 4	POC; 3*	MCH; 3	DAY; 25	POC; 1*	TAL; 17	GLN; 2	MCH; 7	BRI; 11	DAR; 8	RCH; 9	DOV; 36	MAR; 1	NWS; 16	CLT; 36	CAR; 4	PHO; 8	ATL; 2			3rd	4017
1991	Geoff Bodine	11	Ford	DAY; 32	RCH; 13	CAR; 12	ATL; 23	DAR; 9	BRI; 24	NWS; 28	MAR; 20	TAL; 6					MCH; 39	DAY; 2	POC; 3	TAL; 30	GLN; 22	MCH; 35	BRI; 31	DAR; 7	RCH; 14	DOV; 2	MAR; 23	NWS; 15	CLT; 1	CAR; 4	PHO; 8	ATL; 8			14th	3277
1991	Tommy Ellis	97	Ford										CLT; 16	DOV; 21																					14th	3277
1991	Geoff Bodine	97	Ford												SON; 8	POC; 5																			14th	3277
1992	Bill Elliott	11	Ford	DAY; 27	CAR; 1*	RCH; 1*	ATL; 1	DAR; 1	BRI; 20	NWS; 20	MAR; 10	TAL; 2	CLT; 14	DOV; 13	SON; 5*	POC; 3	MCH; 10	DAY; 5	POC; 13	TAL; 5	GLN; 14	MCH; 3	BRI; 6	DAR; 3	RCH; 14	DOV; 2	MAR; 30	NWS; 26	CLT; 30	CAR; 4	PHO; 31	ATL; 1			2nd	4068
1993	Bill Elliott	11	Ford	DAY; 39	CAR; 11	RCH; 33	ATL; 9	DAR; 14	BRI; 30	NWS; 10	MAR; 27	TAL; 22	SON; 17	CLT; 6	DOV; 17	POC; 10	MCH; 9	DAY; 20	NHA; 9	POC; 3	TAL; 11	GLN; 4	MCH; 10	BRI; 11	DAR; 18	RCH; 2	DOV; 10	MAR; 12	NWS; 18	CLT; 10	CAR; 3	PHO; 5	ATL; 4		8th	3774
1994	Bill Elliott	11	Ford	DAY; 9	CAR; 39	RCH; 12	ATL; 32	DAR; 3	BRI; 30	NWS; 18	MAR; 9	TAL; 19	SON; 30	CLT; 22	DOV; 31	POC; 10	MCH; 11	DAY; 19	NHA; 16	POC; 17	TAL; 2	IND; 3	GLN; 12	MCH; 7	BRI; 5	DAR; 1	RCH; 15	DOV; 28	MAR; 3	NWS; 6	CLT; 33	CAR; 6	PHO; 35	ATL; 38	11th	3617
1995	Brett Bodine	11	Ford	DAY; 25	CAR; 14	RCH; 18	ATL; 23	DAR; 12	BRI; 27	NWS; 9	MAR; 11	TAL; 30	SON; 29	CLT; 35	DOV; 21	POC; 10	MCH; 40	DAY; 20	NHA; 21	POC; 15	TAL; 28	IND; 24	GLN; 16	MCH; 36	BRI; 28	DAR; 31	RCH; 16	DOV; 17	MAR; 22	NWS; 22	CLT; 27	CAR; 27	PHO; 17	ATL; 20	20th	2988

=== Car No. 27 results ===
NASCAR Winston Cup Series results
Year	Driver	No.	Make	1	2	3	4	5	6	7	8	9	10	11	12	13	14	15	16	17	18	19	20	21	22	23	24	25	26	27	28	29	30	31	Owners	Pts
1974	Earl Ross	52	Chevy	RSD	DAY	RCH	CAR	BRI	ATL	DAR	NWS	MAR	TAL	NSV	DOV	CLT	RSD	MCH; 2	DAY; 13	BRI; 16	NSV; 8	ATL; 20	POC; 13	TAL; 10	MCH; 6	DAR; 22	RCH; 15	DOV; 3	NWS; 4	MAR; 1	CLT; 20	CAR; 8	ONT; 8		8th	1009.47
1984	Neil Bonnett	12	Chevy	DAY; 4	RCH; 5	CAR; 28	ATL; 33	BRI; 11	NWS; 9	DAR; 10	MAR; 5	TAL; 23	NSV; 2*	DOV; 15	CLT; 12	RSD; 2	POC; 14	MCH; 17	DAY; 9	NSV; 10	POC; 19	TAL; 19	MCH; 13	BRI; 23	DAR; 30	RCH; 7	DOV; 6	MAR; 5	CLT; 16	NWS; 4	CAR; 33	ATL; 21	RSD; 6		8th	3802
1985	Neil Bonnett	12	Chevy	DAY; 10	RCH; 23	CAR; 1	ATL; 3	BRI; 19	DAR; 6	NWS; 1*	MAR; 5	TAL; 26	DOV; 8	CLT; 15	RSD; 27	POC; 5	MCH; 8	DAY; 12	POC; 2*	TAL; 2	MCH; 11	BRI; 3	DAR; 4	RCH; 9	DOV; 5	MAR; 9	NWS; 10	CLT; 42	CAR; 15	ATL; 12	RSD; 3				4th	3902
1986	Neil Bonnett	12	Chevy	DAY; 32	RCH; 7	CAR; 9	ATL; 34	BRI; 30	DAR; 4	NWS; 11	MAR; 26	TAL; 40	DOV; 28	CLT; 13	RSD; 8	POC; 23	MCH; 25	DAY; 11	POC; 31		GLN; 5	MCH; 34	BRI; 11	DAR; 24	RCH; 5	DOV; 2	MAR; 8	NWS; 12	CLT; 3	CAR; 1	ATL; 6	RSD; 9			13th	3369
1986	Davey Allison	12	Chevy																	TAL; 7															13th	3369
1991	Sterling Marlin	22	Ford	DAY; 2	RCH; 9	CAR; 33	ATL; 7	DAR; 10	BRI; 27	NWS; 22	MAR; 28	TAL; 4	CLT; 11	DOV; 15	SON; 26	POC; 8	MCH; 13	DAY; 8	POC; 5	TAL; 5	GLN; 12	MCH; 12	BRI; 2	DAR; 6	RCH; 10	DOV; 17	MAR; 14	NWS; 13	CLT; 5	CAR; 8	PHO; 3	ATL; 7			7th	3839
1992	Sterling Marlin	22	Ford	DAY; 35	CAR; 15	RCH; 7	ATL; 17	DAR; 22	BRI; 32	NWS; 8	MAR; 2	TAL; 4	CLT; 22	DOV; 14	SON; 16	POC; 7	MCH; 32	DAY; 2	POC; 11	TAL; 2	GLN; 16	MCH; 7	BRI; 15	DAR; 28	RCH; 21	DOV; 33	MAR; 7	NWS; 5	CLT; 16	CAR; 5	PHO; 9	ATL; 7			10th	3603
1993	Hut Stricklin	27	Ford	DAY; 4	CAR; 13	RCH; 18	ATL; 20	DAR; 28	BRI; 27	NWS; 22	MAR; 26	TAL; 20	SON; 10	CLT; 20	DOV; 15	POC; 13	MCH; 21	DAY; 40	NHA; 25	POC; 28	TAL; 12	GLN; 17	MCH; 34	BRI; 32	DAR; 36	RCH; 17	DOV; 29	MAR; 23	NWS; 28	CLT; 23	CAR; 24	PHO; 36	ATL; 22		24th	2866
1994	Jimmy Spencer	27	Ford	DAY; 37	CAR; 12	RCH; 22	ATL; 10	DAR; 27	BRI; 35	NWS; 32	MAR; 18	TAL; 4	SON; 26	CLT; 19	DOV; 39	POC; 37	MCH; 23	DAY; 1	NHA; 32	POC; 24	TAL; 1	IND; 43		MCH; 20	BRI; DNQ	DAR; 37	RCH; 35	DOV; 39	MAR; 20	NWS; 23	CLT; 16	CAR; 38	PHO; 38	ATL; 20	27th	2710
1994	Tommy Kendall	27	Ford																				GLN; 22												27th	2710
1995	Loy Allen Jr.	27	Ford	DAY; 17	CAR; 28	RCH; 29	ATL; DNQ	DAR; 18	BRI; DNQ																										39th	2048
1995	Jeff Purvis	27	Ford							NWS; DNQ																									39th	2048
1995	Elton Sawyer	27	Ford								MAR; 20	TAL; 27	SON; DNQ	CLT; 25	DOV; 41		MCH; 23		NHA; 23	POC; 29	TAL; 14	IND; 41	GLN; 29	MCH; 21	BRI; DNQ	DAR; 32	RCH; 38	DOV; 40	MAR; 33	NWS; 34	CLT; 28	CAR; 31	PHO; 30	ATL; 28	39th	2048
1995	Jimmy Horton	27	Ford													POC; 34																			39th	2048
1995	Greg Sacks	27	Ford															DAY; 17																	39th	2048
