= Jim Vandiver =

American racing driver (1939–2015)

- Born: December 13, 1939; Huntersville, North Carolina, U.S.
- Died: June 18, 2015 (aged 75); Charlotte, North Carolina, U.S.

NASCAR Cup Series career
- 85 races run over 14 years
- Best finish: 30th (1975)
- First race: 1968 Hickory 250 (Hickory)
- Last race: 1983 World 600 (Charlotte)
Wins	Top tens	Poles
0	24	0

Jim Vandiver (December 13, 1939 – June 18, 2015) was an American NASCAR Winston Cup Series driver who raced from 1968 to 1983. As an independent driver, he had limited financial resources but enjoyed a level of success that relatively few independent drivers had during the formative years of NASCAR.

== Career ==
Vandiver competed in 85 races with five finishes in the top-five, 24 top-ten finishes, 117 laps led out of 16529, and a total mileage count of 24247.8 miles. Over his career, he had a total of $167,703 in winnings earned on the track ($542,107.09 when adjusted for inflation).

At the 1972 Daytona 500, Vandiver finished third to winner A. J. Foyt. Vandiver is also the only undefeated ARCA driver at Talladega Superspeedway with victories in 1970 and 1975.

Most of Vandiver's earlier racers were done in Dodge vehicles. In his later career, he drove Oldsmobile and Chevrolet racecars.

Vandiver later operated Choice Trucks, a used truck dealership in Huntersville, North Carolina.

Vandiver was involved in the controversial 1969 Talladega 500, where he came in second place to Richard Brickhouse in a questionable finish. Both Vandiver and car owner Ray Fox Sr. were adamant that Brickhouse was a lap down because he had stopped to pit under the green flag (Vandiver only pitted under the Caution). Even after three hours of arguing the decision, Brickhouse was still made the winner of the event. Conspiracy theorists cite the difference in the Dodges as the determining factor since Vandiver was in an older Charger 500 and Brickhouse was in the brand new, winged Dodge Daytona.

Vandiver is known for an unusual exit to the 1973 Southern 500 in Darlington, South Carolina. He was due to be arrested for not showing up to divorce court for a child custody hearing, and had to figure out a way to avoid going to jail. His engine began running worse and worse so he waved goodbye to his pit crew and intentionally spun out his Dodge. To avoid the authorities seizing him on the track in front of the spectators, he ran across the track to escape and hitchhiked a ride to Charlotte, North Carolina in order to get home.

== Personal life and death ==
Vandiver was divorced and had four children; Emory, Rhett, Nicole and Shannon. Emory is a former softball player, Rhett also drives race cars, Nicole and Shannon are practicing lawyers in Davidson, North Carolina.

Vandiver's sister, Lillian, also raced - participating in the 1976 and 1977 NASCAR DASH series.

On June 15, 2015, Vandiver was admitted to a Charlotte hospital for chest pains. He died three days later at the age of 75.

== Motorsports results ==
=== NASCAR ===
(key) (Bold – Pole position awarded by qualifying time. Italics – Pole position earned by points standings or practice time. * – Most laps led.)

==== Grand National Series ====
NASCAR Grand National Series results
Year	Team	No.	Make	1	2	3	4	5	6	7	8	9	10	11	12	13	14	15	16	17	18	19	20	21	22	23	24	25	26	27	28	29	30	31	32	33	34	35	36	37	38	39	40	41	42	43	44	45	46	47	48	49	50	51	52	53	54	NGNC	Pts	Ref
1968	Tom Vandiver	1	Chevy	MGR	MGY	RSD	DAY	BRI	RCH	ATL	HCY; 22	GPS	CLB	NWS	MAR	AUG	AWS	DAR	BLV	LGY	CLT	ASH	MGR	SMR	BIR	CAR	GPS	DAY	ISP	OXF	FDA	TRN	BRI	SMR	NSV	ATL	CLB	BGS	AWS	SBO	LGY	DAR	HCY	RCH	BLV	HBO	MAR	NWS	AUG	CLT	CAR	JFC						124th	0	
1969	Fox Racing	3	Dodge	MGR	MGY	RSD	DAY	DAY	DAY	CAR	AUG	BRI	ATL	CLB	HCY	GPS	RCH	NWS	MAR	AWS	DAR	BLV	LGY	CLT	MGR	SMR	MCH	KPT	GPS	NCF	DAY	DOV	TPN	TRN	BLV	BRI	NSV	SMR	ATL	MCH	SBO	BGS	AWS	DAR	HCY	RCH	TAL; 2*	CLB			CLT; 43	SVH	AUG	CAR	JFC	MGR	TWS	96th	24	
1969	Jim Lineberger	13	Chevy																																														MAR; 10	NWS								96th	24	
1970	Fox Racing	3	Dodge	RSD	DAY; 9	DAY	DAY; 38	RCH	CAR	SVH	ATL; 21	BRI																																														46th	519	
1970	Jim Vandiver	31	Dodge										TAL; 33	NWS	CLB	DAR; 35	BLV	LGY	CLT; 10	SMR	MAR	MCH; 6	RSD	HCY	KPT	GPS	DAY; 33	AST	TPN	TRN	BRI	SMR	NSV	ATL; 9	CLB	ONA	MCH	TAL; 9	BGS	SBO	DAR	HCY	RCH	DOV	NCF	NWS	CLT; 33	MAR		CAR; 16								46th	519	
1970	Bub Strickler	58	Chevy																																														MGR; 19									46th	519	
1970	Cecil Gordon	97	Chevy																																																LGY; 14							46th	519	
1971	O. L. Nixon	31	Dodge	RSD	DAY	DAY; 17	DAY; 6	ONT	RCH	CAR	HCY	BRI	ATL; 8	CLB	GPS	SMR	NWS	MAR	DAR; 5	SBO	TAL; 6	ASH	KPT	CLT; 11	DOV	MCH	RSD	HOU	GPS	DAY	BRI	AST	ISP	TRN	NSV	ATL	BGS	ONA	MCH	TAL	CLB	HCY	DAR	MAR														48th	553	
1971	Faustina Racing	5	Plymouth																																										CLT; 42	DOV	CAR	MGR	RCH	NWS	TWS							48th	553	

==== Winston Cup Series ====
NASCAR Winston Cup Series results
Year	Team	No.	Make	1	2	3	4	5	6	7	8	9	10	11	12	13	14	15	16	17	18	19	20	21	22	23	24	25	26	27	28	29	30	31	NWCC	Pts	Ref
1972	O. L. Nixon	31	Dodge	RSD	DAY; 3	RCH; 28	ONT; 51	CAR; 3	ATL; 32	BRI; 17	DAR; 16	NWS; 26		TAL; 36	CLT; 40										MCH; 36	NSV	DAR; 8	RCH	DOV	MAR	NWS	CLT; 33	CAR; 30	TWS	31st	2514.35	
1972	Bill Strong	51	Chevy										MAR; 32																						31st	2514.35	
1972	A. J. Cox	81	Dodge													DOV; 22	MCH	RSD	TWS	DAY	BRI	TRN	ATL	TAL											31st	2514.35	
1973	O. L. Nixon	31	Dodge	RSD	DAY; 28	RCH	CAR; 7	BRI	ATL; 10	NWS	DAR	MAR	TAL; 8	NSV	CLT; 6	DOV	TWS	RSD	MCH	DAY; 32	BRI	ATL			DAR; 27	RCH	DOV	NWS	MAR	CLT; 17	CAR; 32				31st	2508.85	
1973	J. Marvin Millis	4	Dodge																				TAL; 35	NSV											31st	2508.85	
1974	O. L. Nixon	31	Dodge	RSD	DAY; 27	RCH	CAR	BRI	ATL	DAR	NWS	MAR	TAL; 16	NSV	DOV	CLT; 8	RSD	MCH	DAY; 35	BRI	NSV	ATL	POC	TAL; 33	MCH	DAR; 15	RCH	DOV	NWS	MAR	CLT; 39	CAR	ONT		40th	71.4	
1975	John Keselowski	99	Dodge	RSD	DAY; 35	RCH	CAR	BRI																											30th	1228	
1975	Elder-Ranier	31	Dodge						ATL; 26	NWS	DAR	MAR	TAL; 27	NSV	DOV	CLT; 15	RSD	MCH	DAY; 14	NSV	POC	TAL; 33	MCH	DAR; 4	DOV	NWS; 9	MAR; 8	CLT; 23	RCH; 27	CAR; 8	BRI	ATL; 28	ONT		30th	1228	
1976	Elder-Ranier	31	Dodge	RSD	DAY	CAR	RCH	BRI	ATL	NWS	DAR	MAR	TAL; 13	NSV	DOV	CLT	RSD	MCH	DAY	NSV	POC	TAL	MCH	BRI	DAR	RCH	DOV	MAR	NWS	CLT	CAR	ATL	ONT		87th	124	
1977	Elder-Ranier	31	Dodge	RSD	DAY; 20	RCH	CAR	ATL	NWS	DAR	BRI	MAR	TAL	NSV	DOV	CLT	RSD	MCH	DAY	NSV	POC	TAL	MCH	BRI	DAR	RCH	DOV	MAR	NWS	CLT	CAR	ATL	ONT		90th	103	
1978	O. L. Nixon	89	Chevy	RSD	DAY; DNQ	RCH	CAR	ATL	BRI	DAR	NWS	MAR	TAL	DOV	CLT; 27	NSV	RSD	MCH	DAY	NSV	POC	TAL	MCH	BRI	DAR	RCH	DOV	MAR	NWS	CLT	CAR	ATL	ONT		81st	131	
1979	O. L. Nixon	89	Olds	RSD	DAY; 41	CAR	RCH	ATL	NWS	BRI	DAR	MAR	TAL	NSV	DOV	CLT; 19	TWS	RSD	MCH	DAY	NSV	POC	TAL	MCH	BRI					CLT; 34	NWS	CAR	ATL	ONT	62nd	225	
1979	Elder-Ranier	9	Chevy																							DAR; 28	RCH	DOV	MAR						62nd	225	
1980	O. L. Nixon	89	Olds	RSD	DAY; 37	RCH	CAR	ATL	BRI	DAR	NWS	MAR	TAL; 39	NSV	DOV	CLT; 8	TWS	RSD	MCH	DAY; 25	NSV	POC	TAL	MCH	BRI	DAR	RCH	DOV	NWS	MAR	CLT	CAR	ATL	ONT	52nd	328	
1983	Gordon Racing	24	Chrysler	DAY	RCH	CAR	ATL; 39	DAR	NWS	MAR	TAL	NSV	DOV	BRI	CLT; 21	RSD	POC	MCH	DAY	NSV	POC	TAL	MCH	BRI	DAR	RCH	DOV	MAR	NWS	CLT	CAR	ATL	RSD		88th	88	

===== Daytona 500 =====
Year	Team	Manufacturer	Start	Finish
1970	Ray Fox	Dodge	17	38
1971	O. L. Nixon	Dodge	32	6
1972	O. L. Nixon	Dodge	8	3
1973	O. L. Nixon	Dodge	18	28
1974	O. L. Nixon	Dodge	6	27
1975	John Keselowski	Dodge	34	35
1977	Elder-Ranier	Dodge	19	20
1978	O. L. Nixon	Chevrolet	24	38
1979	O. L. Nixon	Oldsmobile	39	41
1980	O. L. Nixon	Oldsmobile	40	37
