= 1974 Southern 500 =

Auto race held at Darlington Raceway in 1974

Coordinates: 34°17′50.5″N 79°54′18.4″W

Race details
- Race 23 of 30 in the 1974 NASCAR Winston Cup Series season
- 1974 Southern 500 program cover
- Date: September 2, 1974
- Official name: Southern 500
- Location: Darlington Raceway, Darlington, South Carolina
- Course: Permanent racing facility
- Course length: 1.375 miles (2.212 km)
- Distance: 367 laps, 500.5 mi (805.4 km)
- Weather: Extremely hot with temperatures of 91.9 °F (33.3 °C); wind speeds of 8.9 miles per hour (14.3 km/h)
- Average speed: 111.075 mph (178.758 km/h)
- Attendance: 65,000

Pole position
Driver	Richard Petty	Petty Enterprises
- Time: 32.755 seconds

Most laps led
Driver	Cale Yarborough	Junior Johnson & Associates
- Laps: 159

Winner
No. 11	Cale Yarborough	Junior Johnson & Associates

Television in the United States
- Network: n/a
- Announcers: n/a

The 1974 Southern 500, the 25th running of the event, was a NASCAR Winston Cup Series race on September 2, 1974, at Darlington Raceway in Darlington, South Carolina. Richard Petty started on pole but Cale Yarborough led the most laps and won the event by a full lap ahead of second-place finisher Darrell Waltrip. Jerry Schild would score his only top-ten finish at this event, and David Sisco finished a career-best third place.

== Background ==
Darlington Raceway, nicknamed by many NASCAR fans and drivers as "The Lady in Black" or "The Track Too Tough to Tame" and advertised as a "NASCAR Tradition", is a race track built for NASCAR racing located near Darlington, South Carolina. It is of a unique, somewhat egg-shaped design, an oval with the ends of very different configurations, a condition which supposedly arose from the proximity of one end of the track to a minnow pond the owner refused to relocate. This situation makes it very challenging for the crews to set up their cars' handling in a way that will be effective at both ends.

The track is a four-turn 1.366 miles (2.198 km) oval. The track's first two turns are banked at twenty-five degrees, while the final two turns are banked two degrees lower at twenty-three degrees. The front stretch (the location of the finish line) and the back stretch is banked at six degrees. Darlington Raceway can seat up to 60,000 people.

Darlington has something of a legendary quality among drivers and older fans; this is probably due to its long track length relative to other NASCAR speedways of its era and hence the first venue where many of them became cognizant of the truly high speeds that stock cars could achieve on a long track. The track allegedly earned the moniker The Lady in Black because the night before the race the track maintenance crew would cover the entire track with fresh asphalt sealant, in the early years of the speedway, thus making the racing surface dark black. Darlington is also known as "The Track Too Tough to Tame" because drivers can run lap after lap without a problem and then bounce off of the wall the following lap. Racers will frequently explain that they have to race the racetrack, not their competition. Drivers hitting the wall are considered to have received their "Darlington Stripe" thanks to the missing paint on the right side of the car.

== Race report ==
A crowd of 65,000 people would see a race lasting four hours and thirty minutes. There were eleven cautions for 101 laps; which has become the longest duration under the yellow flag in Darlington Raceway history. The race itself lasted 367 laps on the paved track spanning 1.366 miles (2.198 km) in distance. Richard Petty was the pole winner at a speed of 150.132 miles per hour (241.614 km/h). There were 39 Americans and one Canadian competitor in the race; Earl Ross. Roy Mayne and Jerry Hansen would make their respective exits from the NASCAR Cup Series after this race.

Bobby Allison climbed into the No. 24 Cecil Gordon car after falling out early and substituted for Gordon until his car fell out also. He did not want to blow the engine and possibly crash Cecil's only car.

Only twelve vehicles finished the race; Cale Yarborough defeated Darrell Waltrip by one lap. Yarborough was able to successfully spin his vehicle trying to avoid a crash involving Bobby Allison, Bob Burcham, and Richie Panch early in the race, becoming a three-time Southern 500 winner. Petty didn't score more points than Waltrip during the race; however, the overall standings after each race were made by multiplying each driver's points tally with the number of races he started. Thus, it became possible for Petty to increase his lead by finishing behind.

This was the best career finish for Pee Wee Wentz.

Last-place finisher Earl Brooks had a water pump issue on the first lap of the race, earning $1,100 ($7,181 when adjusted for inflation) while the race winner went home $28,000 richer ($182,794 when adjusted for inflation). Chevrolet and Dodge vehicles were the mainstay of the racing lineup; with racing models varying from 1972 to 1974. The average speed of the race was 111.075 miles per hour (178.758 km/h); with speeds improving measurably since the 1964 Southern 500. Not counting bonus money, this race counted as $15,000 to win and $10,000 for second. Petty had about $200,000 in season winnings and Cale was closer to accumulating $175,000 in his 1974 NASCAR season.

Notable crew chiefs for this race were Tim Brewer, Jake Elder, Travis Carter, Dale Inman, Tom Vandiver, and Bud Moore, among others.

A lot of veterans might do well to take driving lessons from teen-aged Jerry Schild.

— Cale Yarborough

Thirteen of the 40 drivers on the starting grid would see their race end prematurely due to engine failures, and eight crashes were recorded by NASCAR. This resulted in a majority of the starting grid not finishing the race. The total prize purse for this event was $132,435 ($864,581 when adjusted for inflation).

=== Qualifying ===
Grid	No.	Driver	Manufacturer	Speed	Qualifying time	Owner
1	43	Richard Petty	'74 Dodge	150.132	32.755	Petty Enterprises
2	15	Buddy Baker	'73 Ford	150.096	32.763	Bud Moore
3	21	David Pearson	'73 Mercury	149.552	32.882	Wood Brothers
4	11	Cale Yarborough	'74 Chevrolet	148.991	33.006	Junior Johnson
5	12	Bobby Allison	'74 AMC Matador	148.842	33.039	Roger Penske
6	95	Darrell Waltrip	'74 Chevrolet	148.388	33.140	Darrell Waltrip
7	90	Charlie Glotzbach	'72 Ford	148.071	33.211	Junie Donlavey
8	72	Benny Parsons	'74 Chevrolet	147.312	33.382	L.G. DeWitt
9	83	Ramo Stott	'74 Chevrolet	146.469	33.574	Norris Reed
10	52	Earl Ross	'74 Chevrolet	146.052	33.670	Junior Johnson

Failed to qualify: Rick Newsom (#20)
Withdrew from race: Dick Skillen (#78)

== Top 10 finishers ==
Pos	Grid	No.	Driver	Manufacturer	Money	Laps	Laps led	Time/Status
1	4	11	Cale Yarborough	Chevrolet	$28,000	367	159	4:30:48
2	6	95	Darrell Waltrip	Chevrolet	$11,000	366	44	+1 lap
3	21	05	David Sisco	Chevrolet	$7,575	365	24	+2 laps
4	14	2	Dave Marcis	Dodge	$5,850	362	0	+5 laps
5	31	48	James Hylton	Chevrolet	$4,650	360	2	+7 laps
6	12	49	G.C. Spencer	Dodge	$3,750	358	3	+9 laps
7	13	93	Jackie Rogers	Chevrolet	$3,025	358	0	+9 laps
8	26	07	Jerry Schild	Chevrolet	$3,100	354	0	+13 laps
9	16	18	Joe Frasson	Dodge	$2,850	353	0	+14 laps
10	38	67	Pee Wee Wentz	Plymouth	$2,500	342	0	+25 laps

Preceded by 1974 Yankee 400	NASCAR Winston Cup Series Season; 1974	Succeeded by 1974 Capital City 500
Preceded by 1973	Southern 500 races 1974	Succeeded by 1975
