= Richard Childress =

American racing driver and businessman (born 1945)

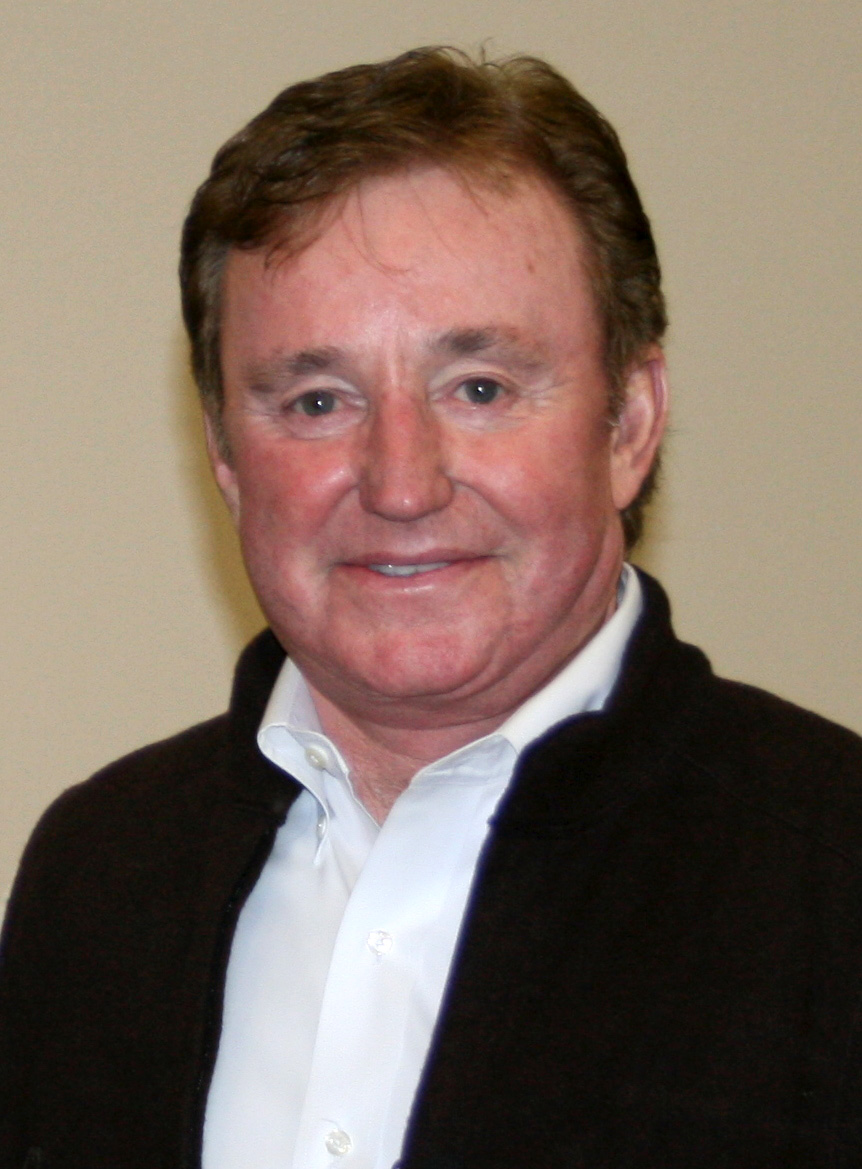
- Childress in 2010
- Born: Richard Reed Childress; September 21, 1945 (age 81); Winston-Salem, North Carolina, U.S.
- Achievements: 1986, 1987, 1990, 1991, 1993, 1994 Winston Cup Series Champion car owner 2001, 2003, 2006, 2007, 2013, 2019, 2025 Xfinity Series Champion car owner 1995, 2011 Camping World Truck Series Champion truck owner 2011 ARCA Racing Series Champion car owner
- Awards: NASCAR Hall of Fame (2017)

NASCAR Cup Series career
- 285 races run over 12 years
- Best finish: 5th (1975)
- First race: 1969 Talladega 500 (Talladega)
- Last race: 1981 Winston Western 500 (Riverside)
| Wins | Top tens | Poles |
|---|---|---|
| 0 | 76 | 0 |

NASCAR Grand National East Series career
- 17 races run over 2 years
- Best finish: 9th (1972)
- First race: 1972 Hickory 276 (Hickory)
- Last race: 1973 Buddy Shuman 100 (Hickory)
| Wins | Top tens | Poles |
|---|---|---|
| 0 | 3 | 0 |
- Statistics up to date as of October 30, 2013.

Richard Reed Childress (born September 21, 1945) is an American former race car driver in NASCAR. Childress is the owner of Richard Childress Racing (RCR). In 2004, he opened a vineyard in the Yadkin Valley AVA near Lexington, North Carolina. Childress sat on the board of directors at the National Rifle Association until 2019. Childress has been a co-owner of the Professional Bull Riders' Carolina Cowboys team since 2022.

== Driving career ==
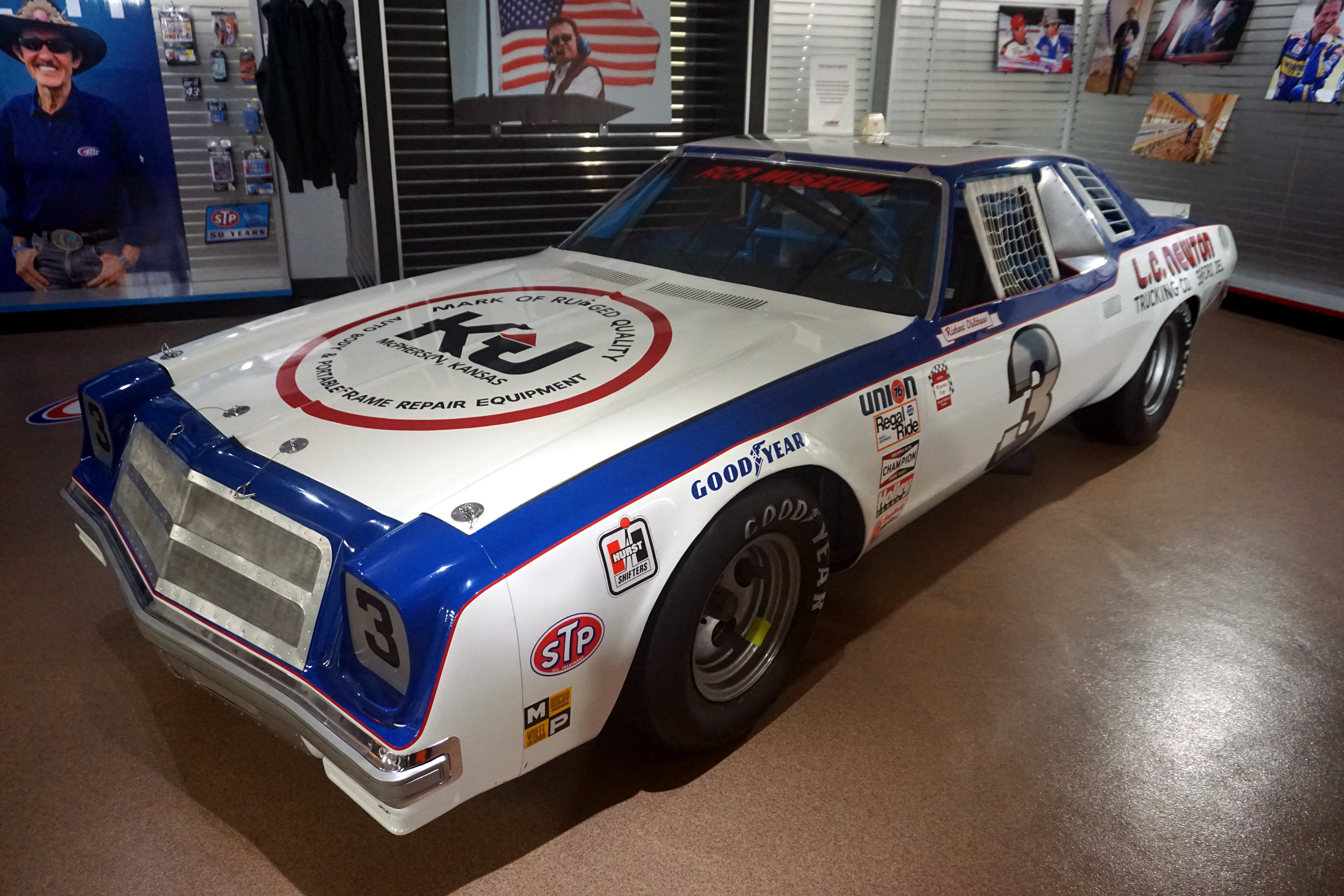
Childress's 1976 No. 3 Kansas Jack Chevrolet Chevelle Laguna

Childress's career in NASCAR started in 1969 when a drivers' strike at Talladega Superspeedway left NASCAR president Bill France Sr. looking for replacement drivers. By 1971, Childress was racing as an independent driver, using the No. 96. He changed to No. 3 in 1976 as a tribute to Junior Johnson. Although he never won as a driver, he nonetheless proved to be capable and consistent behind the wheel, registering six top-5 finishes, seventy-six top-ten finishes, and five top-ten point finishes, with a career-best ranking of fifth in 1975. He did, however, win the unofficial invitational Metrolina 200 in 1974.

== Ownership of Richard Childress Racing ==
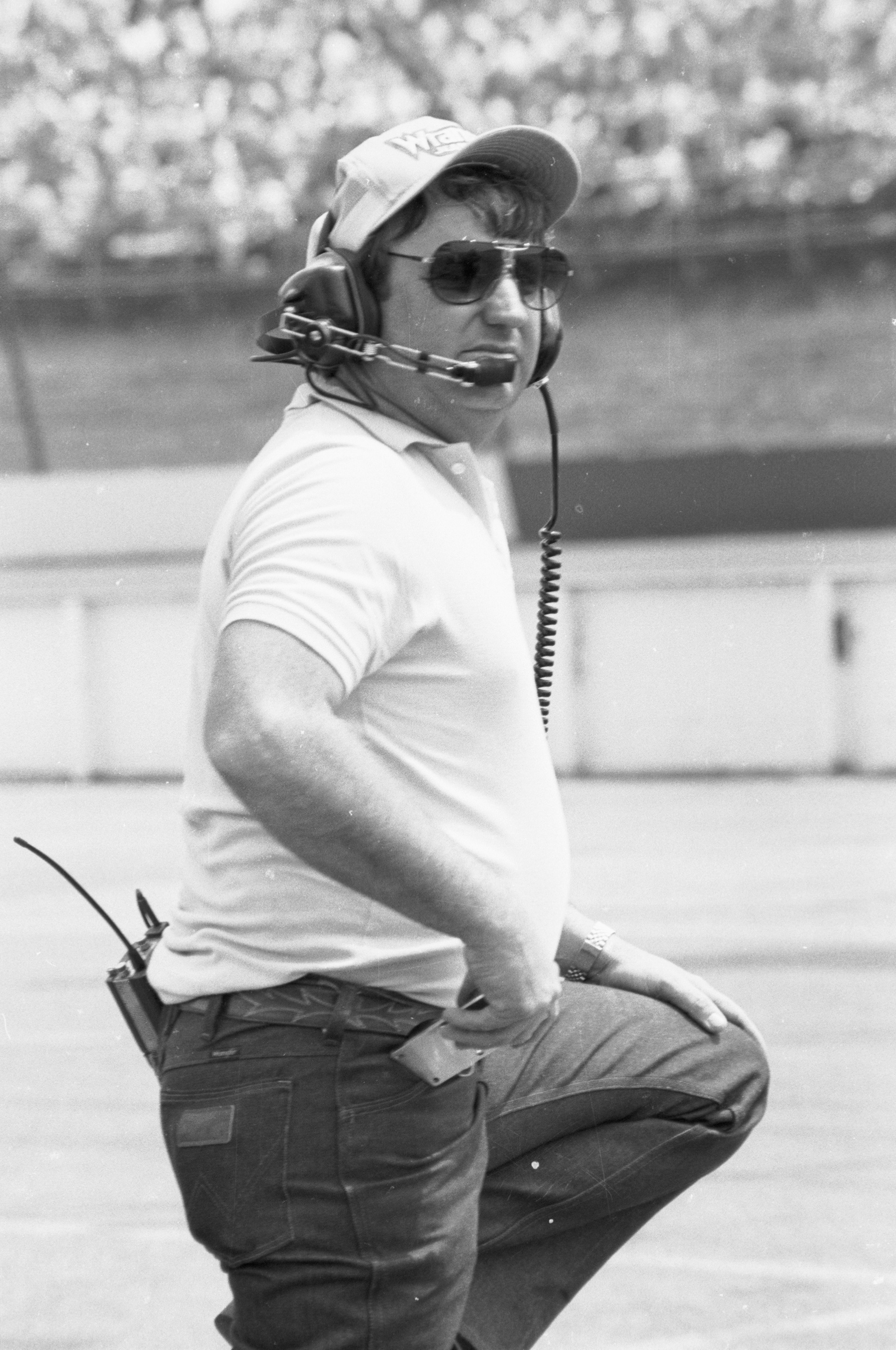
Childress working the pits in 1986

He retired from driving in 1981 after Rod Osterlund sold his NASCAR team to Jim Stacy, and Osterlund's driver Dale Earnhardt did not want to drive for Stacy. Childress, with recommendations from R. J. Reynolds Tobacco Company, chose to retire and put Earnhardt behind the wheel of his No. 3 car, complete with Wrangler Jeans sponsorship. That first alliance with Earnhardt lasted for a single season. Ricky Rudd was hired in 1982 and drove for two years, giving the Childress team its first career victory in June 1983 at Riverside. Earnhardt returned for the 1984 season, and together with Childress formed one of the most potent combinations in NASCAR history. Earnhardt won championships in 1986, 1987, 1990, 1991, 1993, and 1994. In the mid-1990s, Childress began expanding his racing team, fielding entries in the Busch Series and Craftsman Truck Series. They won the 1995 Craftsman Truck Series championship with driver Mike Skinner in the series's first season. Childress expanded to a two-car operation in the NASCAR Cup Series, with Skinner driving the No. 31. In the early 2000s he added a third car, No. 30, driven by Jeff Green.

Earnhardt was killed on the last lap of the 2001 Daytona 500. Childress promoted Busch driver Kevin Harvick to drive the renumbered No. 29. Harvick would win in only his third start, at the Atlanta Motor Speedway. With Harvick having won the Busch Series championship in 2001 and 2006, RCR became the first team in NASCAR history to win all three of NASCAR's national championship series. RCR also won the Busch Grand National Series Owner's Championships in 2003 with Kevin Harvick and Johnny Sauter and in 2007 with Scott Wimmer and Jeff Burton. RCR won the 2011 NASCAR Camping World Truck Series and the 2013 NASCAR Nationwide Series Championship, both with Childress's grandson Austin Dillon driving the No. 3. Following the sudden passing of Kyle Busch, Childress renumbered the No. 8 to the No. 33 and announced that Austin Hill will drive the No. 33 at Charlotte Motor Speedway.

Childress's current full-time drivers in the NASCAR Cup Series are:

- Austin Dillon No. 3
- Austin Hill No. 33

His drivers in the O'Reilly Auto Parts Series are:

- Jesse Love No. 2
- Austin Hill No. 21

== Personal life ==
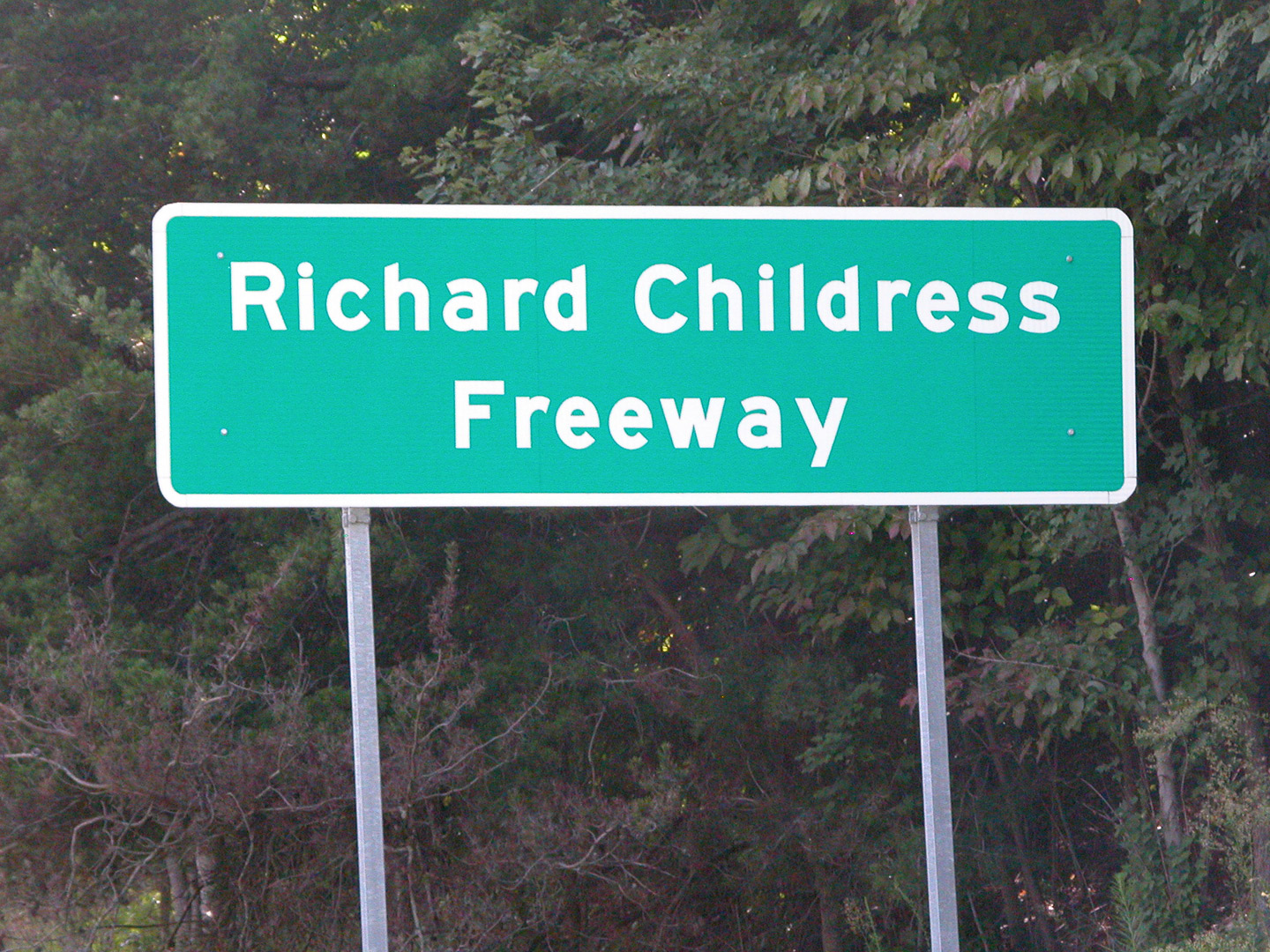
A section of Interstate 85 between exit 96 and exit 102 has been declared the Richard Childress Freeway.

In 2008, Richard and his wife Judy established The Childress Institute for Pediatric Trauma with the mission to lead national efforts to reduce death and disability following injury to children less than 18 years old. The Childress Institute is focused on funding research and medical education throughout the U.S. to improve treatment, as well as raising public awareness.

Childress has a number of racers in his family. His son-in-law is RCR general manager Mike Dillon, long-time Nationwide Series driver who made one Sprint Cup start (1998 California 500) in an RCR car. Austin and Ty Dillon (sons of Mike, grandchildren of Richard) are NASCAR drivers.

In 2017, he was elevated from Second Vice President to First Vice President of the National Rifle Association, which in accordance with NRA tradition would mean he could have expected to serve as the organization's president from 2019 to 2021. However, in 2018 Oliver North was designated to take over as president. In August 2019, amidst controversy surrounding payments being made by the NRA to a law firm, Childress stepped down from the board.

Childress is also a member of the board of directors for Ammo Inc., which contributed 1 million rounds of ammunition to the Armed Forces of Ukraine during the 2022 Russian invasion of Ukraine.

Since 2022, Childress has been co-owner, along with Jeff Broin, of the Carolina Cowboys; one of ten bull riding teams in the Professional Bull Riders (PBR) Team Series, which runs every summer and autumn in the United States. Childress' grandson Austin Dillon is the team's general manager. The Carolina Cowboys won the 2025 PBR Team Series Championship title.

== Controversies ==
=== Alleged favoritism towards Earnhardt and Harvick ===
In the 1980s, RCR fielded only one car - the #3 of Dale Earnhardt, who won 6 of his 7 championships with the team. During the late 1980s and mid 1990s, RCR fielded a part-time #31 for research-and-development purposes. By the mid-1990s, the #31 became a full-time car with Mike Skinner driving. Although the team was fully sponsored by Lowe's, there were claims that RCR weren't putting as many resources into the #31 as they were into the #3, giving Earnhardt an insurmountable competition advantage over his teammate. On a number of occasions, Skinner came close to winning races in the Cup Series in the #31, but lost each time - a couple of times to his teammate. Skinner ultimately never won a Cup race.

During the 2003 Pontiac Excitement 400, there was a feud between RCR drivers Kevin Harvick and Jeff Green. In 2001, Green helped RCR start what eventually became the No. 27 Chevrolet team in the Cup series. Back then, the No. 27 was No. 30 and it was sponsored by AOL, with Green as the driver. Harvick and Green had a Busch Series rivalry, but rejected notions that they couldn't get along. During the race, Harvick wrecked Green with 128 laps to go, taking Green out of the race. An upset Green replied by confronting Harvick's crew chief Todd Berrier in the No. 29 pit stall, leading Richard Childress to restrain him. Green later said to the media, "It's tough to be teammates when it seems like there is only one car at RCR." Green was fired the next day by Childress, who said that change was needed after the relationship had gone awry.

=== Kyle Busch ===
Childress was involved in a physical altercation with fellow Camping World Truck Series owner and former driver Kyle Busch following the Truck race on June 4, 2011. Joey Coulter, driver of Childress's No. 22 Chevrolet Silverado, battled tightly for position with the No. 18 Toyota Tundra of Busch. Coulter would eventually hold off Busch, taking fifth place in the O'Reilly Auto Parts 250. Once the race had concluded, Busch purposely bumped into Coulter's truck on the cool-down lap. Childress reportedly approached Busch in the garage area, took off his jewelry and proceeded to punch Busch in the face. The fight was broken up and insults were exchanged before Childress put Busch in a Grappling hold and hit him again.

Two days later, NASCAR fined Childress US$150,000 and placed him on probation through the end of the year. Busch was not fined or disciplined. NASCAR President Mike Helton stated that..."[Busch] did nothing that would have warranted the actions of Richard Childress."

On September 13, 2022, a press conference was held to announce that Kyle Busch had entered into an agreement with Richard Childress Racing to drive the No. 8 Chevrolet Camaro ZL1 for the 2023 season. In reference to the infamous confrontation, Childress presented Busch with a Rolex watch as a signing bonus, telling him "hold my watch" in reference to the words he told his grandson Austin Dillon before the incident.

=== 2010 New Hampshire controversy ===
In 2010 at the Sylvania 300, Clint Bowyer won the race in Childress's No. 33 Cheerios car. However, his car failed inspection twice for not meeting specifications. Two days later, NASCAR penalized Bowyer's team with a 6-week crew chief suspension, a 150-point deduction and a $150,000 fine for crew chief Shane Wilson. NASCAR executive Robin Pemberton said the only reason the win wasn't also taken away from Childress's team was that Mike Helton considered the team punished enough.

The penalty dropped Bowyer back to 12th in points, 185 points behind then championship leader Denny Hamlin. Childress appealed the decision, which reduced the suspension to four races and $100,000, but the 150-point deduction was upheld. The penalty eliminated any shot Bowyer had at the Cup series championship that year. Childress was pleased that the penalties had been reduced, claiming that chief appellate officer John Middlebrook was fair in the appeal.

Childress maintains that the car failed inspection because it had been damaged by a pushing truck that pushed the car into victory lane when it ran out of gas.

=== Tire deflations ===
Following the 2015 Auto Club 400, NASCAR officials received rumors that teams were purposely deflating their tires. Deflation of the tires provides more control and grip on the track. Officials confiscated the tires of several teams including the No. 31 Richard Childress Racing car driven by Ryan Newman. Two weeks later, NASCAR penalized Childress's team with a $125,000 fine and a six-race suspension for No. 31 crew chief Luke Lambert, and other key players. Newman was also stripped of 75 driver and owner points, which would have dropped him from eighth in the standings to 26th.

Childress and Newman appealed to the National Motorsports Appeal Panel, with their hearing scheduled for April 16. The panel slightly reduced the penalties: the $125,000 fine for Lambert was reduced to $75,000, and the point deduction was reduced to 50, but the suspensions were upheld. Childress then went to the Final Appeals Board, which upheld the revised penalties, leaving Lambert and key players suspended. Newman dropped from eighth to 18th in the standings as a result.

== Awards ==
He was inducted into the Motorsports Hall of Fame of America in 2016.

== Motorsports career results ==
=== NASCAR ===
(key) (Bold – Pole position awarded by qualifying time. Italics – Pole position earned by points standings or practice time. * – Most laps led.)

==== Grand National Series ====
NASCAR Grand National Series results
| Year | Team | No. | Make | 1 | 2 | 3 | 4 | 5 | 6 | 7 | 8 | 9 | 10 | 11 | 12 | 13 | 14 | 15 | 16 | 17 | 18 | 19 | 20 | 21 | 22 | 23 | 24 | 25 | 26 | 27 | 28 | 29 | 30 | 31 | 32 | 33 | 34 | 35 | 36 | 37 | 38 | 39 | 40 | 41 | 42 | 43 | 44 | 45 | 46 | 47 | 48 | 49 | 50 | 51 | 52 | 53 | 54 | NGNC | Pts | Ref |
|---|---|---|---|---|---|---|---|---|---|---|---|---|---|---|---|---|---|---|---|---|---|---|---|---|---|---|---|---|---|---|---|---|---|---|---|---|---|---|---|---|---|---|---|---|---|---|---|---|---|---|---|---|---|---|---|---|---|---|---|---|
| 1969 | Richard Childress Racing | 13 | Chevy | MGR | MGY | RSD | DAY | DAY | DAY | CAR | AUG | BRI | ATL | CLB | HCY | GPS | RCH | NWS | MAR | AWS | DAR | BLV | LGY | CLT | MGR | SMR | MCH | KPT | GPS | NCF | DAY | DOV | TPN | TRN | BLV | BRI | NSV | SMR | ATL | MCH | SBO | BGS | AWS | DAR | HCY | RCH | TAL; 23 | CLB | MAR | NWS | CLT | SVH | AUG | CAR | JFC | MGR | TWS | NA | 0 | |
| 1971 | Garn Racing | 96 | Chevy | RSD | DAY | DAY | DAY | ONT | RCH | CAR | HCY | BRI | ATL | CLB | GPS | SMR | NWS | MAR | DAR | SBO; 21 | TAL | ASH | KPT; 22 | CLT | DOV; 18 | MCH | RSD | HOU | GPS; 23 | DAY | BRI; DNQ | AST; 28 | ISP; 31 | TRN; 36 | NSV; 21 | ATL | BGS; 21 | ONA | MCH | TAL | CLB; 27 | HCY | DAR | MAR; DNQ | CLT | | | | RCH; 20 | NWS | TWS | | | | | | | 46th | 601 | |
| 1971 | Faustina Racing | 5 | Plymouth | | | | | | | | | | | | | | | | | | | | | | | | | | | | | | | | | | | | | | | | | | | DOV; 30 | CAR | MGR | | | | | | | | | | 46th | 601 | |

==== Winston Cup Series ====
NASCAR Winston Cup Series results
| Year | Team | No. | Make | 1 | 2 | 3 | 4 | 5 | 6 | 7 | 8 | 9 | 10 | 11 | 12 | 13 | 14 | 15 | 16 | 17 | 18 | 19 | 20 | 21 | 22 | 23 | 24 | 25 | 26 | 27 | 28 | 29 | 30 | 31 | NWCC | Pts | Ref |
|---|---|---|---|---|---|---|---|---|---|---|---|---|---|---|---|---|---|---|---|---|---|---|---|---|---|---|---|---|---|---|---|---|---|---|---|---|---|
| 1972 | Richard Childress Racing | 96 | Chevy | RSD | DAY | RCH; 29 | ONT; DNQ | CAR; 37 | ATL | BRI; 18 | DAR | NWS; 27 | MAR; 29 | TAL; DNQ | CLT | DOV; 37 | | | TWS; 31 | DAY | BRI; 26 | TRN; 18 | ATL | TAL | MCH | NSV; 16 | DAR | RCH; 25 | DOV; 33 | MAR; 33 | NWS; 25 | CLT | CAR | TWS | 37th | 1521.25 | |
| 1972 | Warren Racing | 96 | Plymouth | | | | | | | | | | | | | | MCH; 19 | RSD | | | | | | | | | | | | | | | | | 37th | 1521.25 | |
| 1973 | Garn Racing | 96 | Chevy | RSD | DAY; DNQ | RCH | CAR; 9 | BRI; 20 | ATL; 13 | NWS; 16 | DAR; 4 | MAR; 24 | TAL; 22 | NSV; 23 | CLT; 11 | DOV; 18 | TWS; 35 | | MCH; 14 | DAY; 27 | BRI; 25 | ATL; 23 | TAL; 31 | NSV; 20 | DAR; 40 | RCH; 12 | DOV; 16 | NWS; 17 | MAR; 25 | CLT; 18 | CAR; 14 | | | | 15th | 5169.5 | |
| 1973 | Garn Racing | 98 | Chevy | | | | | | | | | | | | | | | RSD; 17 | | | | | | | | | | | | | | | | | 15th | 5169.5 | |
| 1974 | Garn Racing | 96 | Chevy | RSD | DAY; 40 | RCH; 16 | CAR; 36 | BRI; 20 | ATL; 27 | DAR; 39 | NWS; 22 | MAR; 10 | TAL; 11 | NSV; 26 | DOV; 21 | CLT; 34 | RSD; 15 | MCH; 6 | DAY; 23 | BRI; 24 | NSV; 23 | ATL; 11 | POC; 12 | TAL; 13 | MCH; 27 | DAR; 18 | RCH; 24 | DOV; 18 | NWS; 7 | MAR; 24 | CLT; 41 | CAR; 24 | ONT; 12 | | 16th | 735.44 | |
| 1975 | Garn Racing | 88 | Chevy | RSD; 11 | | | | | | | | | | | | | | | | | | | | | | | | | | | | | | | 5th | 3818 | |
| 1975 | Garn Racing | 96 | Chevy | | DAY; 18 | RCH; 9 | CAR; 6 | BRI; 9 | ATL; 15 | NWS; 17 | DAR; 22 | MAR; 9 | TAL; 10 | NSV; 16 | DOV; 16 | CLT; 23 | RSD; 9 | MCH; 10 | DAY; 13 | NSV; 6 | POC; 5 | TAL; 13 | MCH; 31 | DAR; 7 | DOV; 6 | NWS; 8 | MAR; 4 | CLT; 8 | RCH; 21 | CAR; 21 | BRI; 13 | ATL; 12 | ONT; 10 | | 5th | 3818 | |
| 1976 | Richard Childress Racing | 3 | Chevy | RSD; 7 | DAY; 9 | CAR; 23 | RCH; 6 | BRI; 20 | ATL; 11 | NWS; 9 | DAR; 9 | MAR; 8 | TAL; 24 | NSV; 17 | DOV; 10 | CLT; 17 | RSD; 11 | MCH; 18 | DAY; 12 | NSV; 28 | POC; 9 | TAL; 8 | MCH; 13 | BRI; 10 | DAR; 36 | RCH; 25 | DOV; 20 | MAR; 10 | NWS; 23 | CLT; 15 | CAR; 27 | ATL; 25 | ONT; 36 | | 11th | 3428 | |
| 1977 | Richard Childress Racing | 3 | Chevy | RSD; 6 | DAY; 23 | RCH; 10 | CAR; 17 | ATL; 19 | NWS; 8 | DAR; 17 | BRI; 8 | MAR; 10 | TAL; 21 | NSV; 26 | DOV; 21 | CLT; 14 | RSD; 8 | MCH; 34 | DAY; 19 | NSV; 27 | POC; 17 | TAL; 20 | MCH; 33 | BRI; 8 | DAR; 8 | RCH; 26 | DOV; 7 | MAR; 15 | NWS; 6 | CLT; 16 | CAR; 18 | ATL; 21 | ONT; 10 | | 9th | 3463 | |
| 1978 | Richard Childress Racing | 3 | Chevy | RSD; 20 | | RCH; 8 | CAR; 8 | | | | | | | | | | | | | | | | | | DAR; 27 | | | | | | | | | | 10th | 3566 | |
| 1978 | Richard Childress Racing | 3 | Olds | | DAY; 13 | | | ATL; 15 | BRI; 6 | DAR; 28 | NWS; 10 | MAR; 8 | TAL; 9 | DOV; 33 | CLT; 20 | NSV; 8 | RSD; 15 | MCH; 10 | DAY; 24 | NSV; 3 | POC; 24 | TAL; 25 | MCH; 31 | BRI; 7 | | RCH; 11 | DOV; 12 | MAR; 12 | NWS; 14 | CLT; 9 | CAR; 10 | ATL; 30 | ONT; 11 | | 10th | 3566 | |
| 1979 | Richard Childress Racing | 3 | Olds | RSD; 15 | DAY; 17 | | | ATL; 20 | | | | | TAL; 24 | | | CLT; 10 | TWS; 7 | RSD; 6 | MCH; 23 | DAY; 37 | | | TAL; 10 | MCH; 10 | | | | | | | | | | | 8th | 3735 | |
| 1979 | Richard Childress Racing | 3 | Chevy | | | CAR; 5 | RCH; 26 | | NWS; 7 | BRI; 11 | DAR; 16 | MAR; 14 | | NSV; 6 | DOV; 29 | | | | | | NSV; 7 | POC; 12 | | | BRI; 11 | DAR; 29 | RCH; 15 | DOV; 13 | MAR; 13 | CLT; 14 | NWS; 10 | CAR; 7 | ATL; 15 | ONT; 16 | 8th | 3735 | |
| 1980 | Richard Childress Racing | 3 | Chevy | RSD; 6 | | | CAR; 14 | | | | NWS; 11 | MAR; 11 | | NSV; 29 | DOV; 8 | | TWS; 6 | RSD; 18 | MCH; 14 | | NSV; 9 | POC; 9 | | MCH; 27 | BRI; 9 | DAR; 12 | RCH; 11 | DOV; 37 | NWS; 19 | MAR; 25 | CLT; 11 | CAR; 7 | ATL; 9 | ONT; 21 | 10th | 3742 | |
| 1980 | Richard Childress Racing | 3 | Olds | | DAY; 13 | RCH; 22 | | ATL; 13 | BRI; 29 | DAR; 21 | | | TAL; 12 | | | CLT; 11 | | | | DAY; 8 | | | TAL; 6 | | | | | | | | | | | | 10th | 3742 | |
| 1981 | Richard Childress Racing | 3 | Chevy | RSD; 4 | | | | | | | | | | | | | | | | | | | | | | | | | | | | | | | 25th | 2144 | |
| 1981 | Richard Childress Racing | 3 | Pontiac | | DAY; 38 | RCH; 13 | CAR; 22 | ATL; 17 | BRI; 16 | NWS; 17 | DAR; 31 | MAR; 22 | TAL; 13 | NSV; 13 | DOV; 17 | CLT; 19 | TWS; 14 | RSD; 18 | MCH; 19 | DAY; 21 | NSV; 17 | POC; 23 | TAL; 26 | MCH | BRI | DAR | RCH | DOV | MAR | NWS | CLT | CAR | ATL | | 25th | 2144 | |
| 1981 | Junior Johnson & Associates | 41 | Buick | | | | | | | | | | | | | | | | | | | | | | | | | | | | | | | RSD; 39 | 25th | 2144 | |

===== Daytona 500 =====
| Year | Team | Manufacturer | Start | Finish |
|---|---|---|---|---|
| 1973 | Garn Racing | Chevy | DNQ | |
| 1974 | Garn Racing | Chevy | 36 | 40 |
| 1975 | Garn Racing | Chevy | 36 | 18 |
| 1976 | Richard Childress Racing | Chevy | 36 | 9 |
| 1977 | Richard Childress Racing | Chevy | 32 | 23 |
| 1978 | Richard Childress Racing | Olds | 19 | 13 |
| 1979 | Richard Childress Racing | Olds | 31 | 17 |
| 1980 | Richard Childress Racing | Olds | 22 | 13 |
| 1981 | Richard Childress Racing | Pontiac | 18 | 38 |

== See also ==
- Childress Vineyards
- List of celebrities who own wineries and vineyards
