= 1974 National 500 =

Auto race held at Charlotte Motor Speedway in 1974

Race details
- Race 28 of 30 in the 1974 NASCAR Winston Cup Series season
- Layout of Charlotte Motor Speedway
- Date: October 6, 1974
- Official name: National 500
- Location: Charlotte Motor Speedway, Concord, North Carolina
- Course: Permanent racing facility
- Course length: 1.500 miles (2.414 km)
- Distance: 334 laps, 500 mi (804 km)
- Weather: Temperatures ranging between 37.9 °F (3.3 °C) and 75 °F (24 °C); wind speeds of 5.8 miles per hour (9.3 km/h)
- Average speed: 119.912 miles per hour (192.980 km/h)

Pole position
Driver	David Pearson	Wood Brothers
- Time: 34.016 seconds

Most laps led
Driver	David Pearson	Wood Brothers
- Laps: 91

Winner
No. 21	David Pearson	Wood Brothers

Television in the United States
- Network: ABC
- Announcers: Jim McKay; Chris Economaki

The 1974 National 500 was a NASCAR Winston Cup Series racing event that took place on October 6, 1974, at Charlotte Motor Speedway in Concord, North Carolina.

This race was the 28th out of the 30 races that year. Weather for this race was forecast from Charlotte/Douglas International Airport; located in nearby Charlotte.

== Race report ==
Three hundred and thirty four laps were completed on the paved track spanning 1.500 miles (2.414 km). The race lasted four hours, ten minutes, and forty-one seconds. Nine cautions slowed the race for seventy-nine laps. Dan Daughtry would score his best career NASCAR Winston Cup Series finish at this event.

Notable speeds were: 119.912 miles per hour (192.980 km/h) for the average speed and 158.749 miles per hour (255.482 km/h) for the pole speed. David Pearson defeated Richard Petty by 1.5 seconds with an attendance of 56,000 people. Both Petty and Pearson had to erase two-lap deficits in the process.

The race saw several hard crashes. Before the fifth lap was completed a ten-car crash erupted past the start/finish line and involved Buddy Baker, who'd started 40th after he spun in practice and blew his tires, necessitating the change from the tires on which he'd qualified; NASCAR rules at the time required teams to start the race on the tires on which they'd qualified. In an effort to avoid the stalled car of Richard Childress, Marty Robbins intentionally turned his car away from Childress' disabled machine and hit the outside wall so hard that he required 37 stitches in his face.

Other incidents occurred following the lengthy cleanup. During the yellow for a spinout by rookie Richie Panch ABC Sports, which filmed the race for air later that year, recorded and aired radio conversation between Petty and crew chief Dale Inman about the incident; this caused commentator Chris Economaki to quip that "I don't drive stock cars and I wish Richard Petty wouldn't do expert commentary."

Late in the race Grant Adcox spun out and was hit in the driver side by Ramo Stott in Turn Four. During the yellow for this wreck, a fire erupted in Richard Petty's pit but there were no injuries.

Forty-one American drivers competed; with Earl Ross (from Canada). Fifteen drivers failed to qualify for this race. This list would include 1974 Indianapolis 500 champion Johnny Rutherford, Joe Frasson, and David Sisco. Most of them did end up qualifying after a "second chance qualifying session" on October 3. Rutherford, the 1974 Indianapolis 500 champion, was driving a third Chevrolet fielded by Junior Johnson, as teammate to Yarborough and Earl Ross.

Other notable names competing in the race were: Darrell Waltrip, Dick Trickle, Ron Keselowski, J.D. McDuffie, Cale Yarborough, and Neil Castles. Bobby Isaac drove a Harry Hyde-prepared Dodge as a teammate to Dave Marcis; it was Bobby Issac's final start for Nord Krauskopf. The driver/owner combination that earned the 1970 Winston Cup title reunited for the final time here as Nord fielded a second K & K Insurance Dodge for Bobby, this was their only race together for after parting ways with a few races left in the 1972 season.

Despite finishing second, Petty clinched the Winston Cup Grand National championship as Yarborough fell out with engine failure.

The day before this race, Dale Earnhardt made his first appearance at Charlotte in the World Service Life 300, a NASCAR Late Model Sportsman race (the predecessor to the Nationwide Series) and finished 13th; Bobby Allison won the 300.

The 500 would be the last race for owner Ray Fox, his #3 Dodge Charger finished 29th after a blown engine with Wally Dallenbach Sr. as the driver (also making his last NASCAR start). Darrell Waltrip finished on the lead lap of a Winston Cup race for the first time; it was his sixth top-five finish of the season.

The winner of the race received $22,575 in race winnings ($147,377.28 in when adjusted for inflation) while the last place finisher received $649 in race winnings ($4,236.89 when adjusted for inflation). The lead changed hands 47 times among 11 drivers and was the most competitive Charlotte race in the track's history to that point (the track completed its 15th season of racing).

Notable crew chiefs in attendance were Tim Brewer, Jake Elder, Travis Carter, Harry Hyde, Dale Inman, Tom Vandiver, and Bud Moore.

Even though this race was considered a classic during the 1970s, sparse television coverage has caused it to be lost through the years; a filmed package of the event was aired in late October 1974 on Wide World of Sports. Information about this race has been found in NASCAR's archives and were "unearthed" following David Pearson's induction to the NASCAR Hall of Fame.

=== Qualifying ===
Grid	No.	Driver	Manufacturer	Qualifying time	Speed	Owner
1	21	David Pearson	'73 Mercury	34.016	158.749	Wood Brothers
2	43	Richard Petty	'74 Dodge	34.276	157.545	Petty Enterprises
3	15	Buddy Baker	'73 Ford	34.431	156.835	Bud Moore
4	88	Donnie Allison	'74 Chevrolet	34.478	156.622	DiGard
5	11	Cale Yarborough	'74 Chevrolet	34.512	156.467	Junior Johnson
6	28	A.J. Foyt	'74 Chevrolet	34.562	156.421	Hoss Ellington
7	52	Earl Ross	'74 Chevrolet	34.751	155.391	Junior Johnson
8	12	Bobby Allison	'74 AMC Matador	34.934	154.577	Roger Penske
9	30	Walter Ballard	'74 Chevrolet	35.230	153.278	Vic Ballard
10	35	Dan Daughtry	'72 Ford	35.234	153.261	Morris Davis

== Finishing order ==
Section reference:

1. David Pearson†
2. Richard Petty
3. Darrell Waltrip
4. Donnie Allison
5. Bobby Allison
6. Lennie Pond
7. Harry Jefferson
8. Dick Trickle†
9. Bob Burcham†
10. Dan Daughtry
11. James Hylton†
12. Walter Ballard
13. David Sisco
14. Richie Panch*†
15. Cecil Gordon†
16. Ron Keselowski
17. Ed Negre
18. Grant Adcox*†
19. Ramo Stott*
20. Earl Ross*
21. J.D. McDuffie*†
22. Coo Coo Marlin*†
23. Cale Yarborough*†
24. Johnny Rutherford*
25. Frank Warren*
26. A. J. Foyt*
27. Benny Parsons*†
28. Jackie Rogers*
29. Wally Dallenbach Sr.*
30. Charlie Glotzbach*
31. Dave Marcis*
32. Bobby Isaac*†
33. Elmo Langley*†
34. Jerry Schild*†
35. Harry Gant*
36. Dick Brooks*†
37. Buddy Baker*†
38. Joe Frasson*†
39. Jim Vandiver*
40. Neil Castles*
41. Richard Childress*
42. Marty Robbins*† (crashed his car resulting in a series of injuries; including one that required 37 stitches to his face)

† signifies that the driver is known to be deceased
* Driver failed to finish race

Preceded by 1974 Old Dominion 500	NASCAR Winston Cup Season; 1974	Succeeded by 1974 American 500

Preceded by 1973	National 500 races 1974	Succeeded by 1975
