= 1974 Winston 500 =

Auto race held at Alabama International Motor Speedway in 1974

Race details
- Race 10 of 30 in the 1974 NASCAR Winston Cup Series season
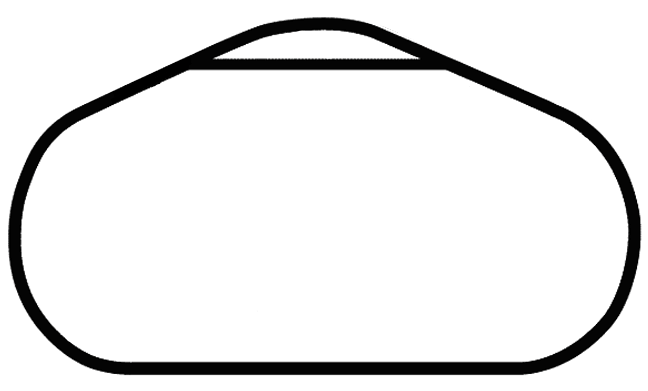
- Layout of Talladega Superspeedway
- Date: May 5, 1974
- Official name: Winston 500
- Location: Alabama International Motor Speedway, Talladega, Alabama
- Course: Permanent racing facility
- Course length: 2.660 miles (4.281 km)
- Distance: 188 laps, 500.08 mi (804.801 km)
- Weather: Very hot with temperatures of 82.9 °F (28.3 °C); wind speeds of 9.9 miles per hour (15.9 km/h)
- Average speed: 130.220 miles per hour (209.569 km/h)

Pole position
Driver	David Pearson	Wood Brothers Racing

Most laps led
Driver	David Pearson	Wood Brothers Racing
- Laps: 58

Winner
No. 21	David Pearson	Wood Brothers Racing

The 1974 Winston 500 was a NASCAR Winston Cup Series racing event that was held on May 5, 1974, at Alabama International Motor Speedway in Talladega, Alabama.

David Pearson acquired one of his superspeedway victories for the 1974 NASCAR Winston Cup Series season at this event. Tickets at this event sold at an average price of $10 ($63.76 when adjusted for inflation). The green flag was waved at 1:00 PM, the checkered flag was waved at 4:28 PM.

== Background ==
Talladega Superspeedway, originally known as Alabama International Motor Superspeedway (AIMS), is a motorsports complex located north of Talladega, Alabama. It is located on the former Anniston Air Force Base in the small city of Lincoln. The track is a Tri-oval and was constructed by International Speedway Corporation, a business controlled by the France Family, in the 1960s. Talladega is most known for its steep banking and the unique location of the start/finish line - located just past the exit to pit road. The track currently hosts the NASCAR series such as the Sprint Cup Series, Xfinity Series, and the Camping World Truck Series. Talladega Superspeedway is the longest NASCAR oval with a length of 2.66 miles (4.28 km), and the track at its peak had a seating capacity of 175,000 spectators.

== Race report ==
As was the case for the first half of the 1974 season, races were reduced by 10% because of the energy crisis. As such, the 450-mile race symbolically started on "Lap 19," with the first 18 laps being listed as "not scored". Engine problems caused most of the drivers not to finish the race.

Jerry Schild made his NASCAR Winston Cup Series debut in this event; starting in 37th and finishing 40th. David Pearson defeated Benny Parsons by 0.2 seconds after racing for 210 minutes. Sixty of these 170 laps were raced under yellow. This race was interrupted by rain approximately three times that day. David Pearson was the best driver on the racing grid during the event, everyone else was just hanging on trying to keep up with him. Bobby Allison had just as good a car and it seemed like he led more than 15 laps. Pearson survived when all of his top competition didn't finish.

A crowd of forty thousand would see the lead change 53 times. Chevrolet and Dodge vehicles would dominate the race's grid while Fords led the most laps. Gary Bettenhausen was dominating the early portions of the race in an AMC Matador until he got run into in the pits on lap 105. People who attended this race still remember sitting in the rain, hoping they would get the race in and they finally did. This was Iggy Katona's only NASCAR Cup Series race in the 1970s and his only one at Talladega. Katona's previous start had been in 1966.

Grant Adcox qualified for the event. With a hundred laps in the books, a caution came out as Donnie Allison's clutch burned out and David Sisco's motor went up in smoke. Gary Bettenhausen, who had pitted a lap after the leaders, and was up on jacks as young Adcox came down for service. Adcox's car hit an oil and water patch and slammed straight into the Bettenhausen Matador, causing catch can man Don Miller to be crushed between the cars. A young crew member of the Nord Krauskopf team who was pitted nearby, Buddy Parrott, came rushing down to help, while Penske crewmembers John Woodward and Dale Watson were also injured. Miller was taken to the hospital and eventually had his right leg amputated. Learning of the extent of Miller's injuries, an upset Adcox withdrew from the event.

Richard Petty was slow in qualifying; starting in 24th place. Petty and Yarborough had brought out their big block engines thinking that the reliability would pay off, but Pearson running a 351 Cleveland held on for the win. Both of the Allisons ran the small-block Chevrolets but they didn't hold up as well as the Fords. This was Charlie Roberts' last race as an owner. He owned Neil Bonnett's car in this race.

The entire prize purse of this race was $144,280 ($919,907 when adjusted for inflation); with the winner receiving $20,785 ($132,522 when adjusted for inflation) while the last-place finisher received $1,175 ($7,492 when adjusted for inflation). A 1973 Mercury Montego would become the winning vehicle at this race. David Pearson would earn the pole position at 186.086 miles per hour (299.476 km/h) during qualifying, as it was the first Talladega Cup race after NASCAR's phase out of the seven-litre engines, with all teams using a 358 ci (5833cc) engine formula that as of 2022 is still in use by NASCAR. it was the slowest Talladega Cup pole speed until Jeremy Mayfield's pole speed at the 2000 spring race.

=== Top 10 finishers ===
Pos	Grid	No.	Driver	Manufacturer	Laps	Laps led	Time/Status
1	1	21	David Pearson	'73 Mercury	188	58	3:28:09
2	11	72	Benny Parsons	'74 Chevrolet	188	9	+0.17 seconds
3	24	43	Richard Petty	'74 Dodge	188	0	Lead lap under green flag
4	19	90	Charlie Glotzbach	'72 Ford	188	1	Lead lap under green flag
5	26	54	Lennie Pond	'74 Chevrolet	187	0	+1 lap
6	22	2	Dave Marcis	'73 Dodge	187	0	+1 lap
7	13	14	Coo Coo Marlin	'73 Chevrolet	187	7	+1 lap
8	9	28	Sam McQuagg	'74 Chevrolet	187	1	+1 lap
9	5	11	Cale Yarborough	'74 Chevrolet	187	0	+1 lap
10	48	57	Bob Burcham	'74 Chevrolet	187	0	+1 lap

Preceded by 1974 Virginia 500	NASCAR Winston Cup Season; 1974	Succeeded by 1974 Music City USA 420
Preceded by 1973 Winston 500	Talladega spring race 1974	Succeeded by 1975 Winston 500
