= 1973 Southern 500 =

Auto race held at Darlington Raceway in 1973

Race details
- Race 22 of 28 in the 1973 NASCAR Winston Cup Series
- 1973 Southern 500 program cover
- Date: September 3, 1973
- Official name: Southern 500
- Location: Darlington Raceway, Darlington, South Carolina
- Course: Permanent racing facility
- Course length: 1.375 miles (2.212 km)
- Distance: 367 laps, 500.5 mi (805.4 km)
- Weather: Race start time: Extremely hot with temperatures of 95 °F (35 °C); Race end time: Extremely hot with temperatures of 100 °F (38 °C) Wind speeds of 8.1 miles per hour (13.0 km/h)
- Average speed: 134.033 miles per hour (215.705 km/h)
- Attendance: 70,000

Pole position
Driver	David Pearson	Wood Brothers Racing

Most laps led
Driver	Cale Yarborough	Howard & Egerton Racing
- Laps: 277

Winner
No. 11	Cale Yarborough	Howard & Egerton Racing

Television in the United States
- Network: ABC
- Announcers: Bill Flemming; Chris Economaki

Radio in the United States
- Radio: Darlington Universal Racing Network (URN)
- Booth announcers: Dave "Silver Throat" Rogers, Hal Hamrick
- Turn announcers: Charlie Bailey, Paul Sexton, Earl Kelley, Dick Jones

The 1973 Southern 500, the 24th running of the event, was a NASCAR Winston Cup Series racing event held on September 3, 1973, at Darlington Raceway in Darlington, South Carolina.

Bud Moore would compete in his last NASCAR Cup Series as a driver after this event.

Jackie Cooper was named honorary race marshal for the 1973 Southern 500.

== Background ==
Darlington Raceway, nicknamed by many NASCAR fans and drivers as "The Lady in Black" or "The Track Too Tough to Tame" and advertised as a "NASCAR Tradition", is a race track built for NASCAR racing located near Darlington, South Carolina. It is of a unique, somewhat egg-shaped design, an oval with the ends of very different configurations, a condition which supposedly arose from the proximity of one end of the track to a minnow pond the owner refused to relocate. This situation makes it very challenging for the crews to set up their cars' handling in a way that will be effective at both ends.

The track is a four-turn 1.366 miles (2.198 km) oval. The track's first two turns are banked at twenty-five degrees, while the final two turns are banked two degrees lower at twenty-three degrees. The front stretch (the location of the finish line) and the back stretch is banked at six degrees. Darlington Raceway can seat up to 60,000 people.

== Summary ==
=== Before race weekend ===
Jim Vandiver, who was dealing with a child custody case with his first wife, was to appear in a Greenville, South Carolina court on Friday, August 31 for a hearing. He was assured by his lawyer that appearing would not be necessary because he was expected in Darlington. The judge at the hearing did not consider this grounds for absence, and found Vandiver in contempt of court. An arrest warrant was issued.

=== Qualifying ===
Pole position for the Southern 500 was taken by David Pearson, of Wood Brothers Racing.

Grid	No.	Driver	Manufacturer	Owner
1	21	David Pearson	'71 Mercury	Wood Brothers
2	12	Bobby Allison	'73 Chevrolet	Bobby Allison
3	43	Richard Petty	'73 Dodge	Petty Enterprises
4	15	Darrell Waltrip	'72 Ford	Bud Moore
5	71	Buddy Baker	'73 Dodge	Nord Krauskopf
6	28	Charlie Glotzbach	'73 Chevrolet	Hoss Ellington
7	73	Benny Parsons	'73 Chevrolet	L.G. DeWitt
8	11	Cale Yarborough	'73 Chevrolet	Richard Howard
9	54	Lennie Pond	'73 Chevrolet	Ronnie Elder
10	77	Charlie Roberts	'72 Chevrolet	Charlie Roberts
11	18	Joe Frasson	'73 Dodge	Joe Frasson
12	67	Buddy Arrington	'72 Dodge	Buddy Arrington
13	24	Cecil Gordon	'72 Chevrolet	Cecil Gordon
14	14	Coo Coo Marlin	'72 Chevrolet	H.B. Cunningham
15	49	G.C. Spencer	'72 Dodge	G.C. Spencer
16	31	Jim Vandiver	'72 Dodge	O.L. Nixon
17	64	Elmo Langley	'72 Ford	Elmo Langley
18	03	Tommy Gale	'71 Mercury	Tommy Gale
19	29	Dick May	'71 Mercury	Bill Hollar
20	48	James Hylton	'71 Mercury	James Hylton

=== Race ===
Neil Castles, who qualified 38th in a Dodge, withdrew before the race. First alternate Mel Larson took his place, 40th on the grid.

Two Greenville County sheriff's deputies arrived at Darlington on race day. In Darlington Raceway president Barney Wallace's office, they informed him of their intent to arrest Vandiver on the contempt charge. Wallace convinced them to make their arrest after the race. Neil Castles had been in Wallace's office at the time, overheard this conversation, and informed Vandiver before the race.

Early in the race, Roy Mayne relieved Jabe Thomas in his car. NASCAR points structure meant that Thomas would receive the points for Mayne's finish. Other drivers took advantage of a relief driver, in part because of the very hot day. Richard Petty was one of these utilizing Lennie Pond to make it through the rest of his race due to his relatively stronger physical endurance and mental endurance.

40 drivers competed in this race; only one foreigner competed - Canadian-born Vic Parsons. This event took three hours and forty-four minutes to complete 367 laps. Richard Childress was credited as the last-place finisher due to a problem with his engine on lap 19. Frank Warren was the lowest-finishing driver to complete the event while being nearly 100 laps behind the lead lap cars.

Jim Vandiver, who was already nursing a problematic engine, would deliberately spin his car on lap 223, on Darlington's backstretch. This caused a caution, and in a break in race traffic, Vandiver jumped the back fence and left raceway property. From there, he hitchhiked home to Monroe, North Carolina, and thus avoided arrest on race day.

Joe Frasson's problematic engine on lap 304 would force him to finish in the middle of the pack.

Cale Yarborough defeated David Pearson under caution in front 70,000 fans. Pearson would qualify for the pole position at 150.366 miles per hour (241.991 km/h) during the solo qualifying sessions. Average race speed was 134.033 miles per hour (215.705 km/h) due to the seven yellow flags for 37 laps. Chevrolet and Ford were the dominant manufacturers at this race. Richard D. Brown quit this race on lap 30 for no apparent reason. Cale Yarborough made quite a comeback at the end of the race while Charlie Glotzbach was really strong during the middle of the race; he dropped out with vehicle problems on lap 152.

Notable crew chiefs in this race were Tim Brewer, Travis Carter, Harry Hyde, Dale Inman, Tom Vandiver, and Jake Elder.

Race earnings ranged from the winner's portion of $23,140 ($167,826 when adjusted for inflation) to the last-place finisher's portion of $1,700 ($12,329 when adjusted for inflation) from a total prize of $126,725. ($919,089 when adjusted for inflation).

=== Finishing order ===
Section reference:

1. Cale Yarborough (No. 11)
2. David Pearson (No. 21)
3. Buddy Baker (No. 71)
4. Richard Petty (No. 43)
5. Benny Parsons (No. 72)
6. Bobby Allison (No. 12)
7. Coo Coo Marlin (No. 14)
8. Darrell Waltrip (No. 15)
9. Dick Brooks (No. 61)
10. J.D. McDuffie (No. 70)
11. Cecil Gordon (No. 24)
12. James Hylton (No. 48)
13. Jabe Thomas (No. 25)
14. Buddy Arrington (No. 67)
15. Randy Tissot (No. 74)
16. Charlie Roberts (No. 77)
17. Walter Ballard (No. 30)
18. D.K. Ulrich (No. 40)
19. Dean Dalton (No. 7)
20. Henley Gray (No. 19)
21. Mel Larson (No. 73)
22. Bill Champion (No. 10)
23. Joe Frasson* (No. 18)
24. Frank Warren (No. 79)
25. Raymond Williams* (No. 47)
26. Ed Negre* (No. 4)
27. Jim Vandiver* (No. 31)
28. David Sisco* (No. 05)
29. Bud Moore* (No. 90)
30. Charlie Glotzbach* (No. 28)
31. Elmo Langley* (No. 64)
32. Dick May* (No. 29)
33. Richie Panch* (No. 98)
34. Vic Parsons* (No. 45)
35. Johnny Barnes* (No. 89)
36. Tommy Gale* (No. 03)
37. Lennie Pond* (No. 54)
38. Richard D. Brown* (No. 44)
39. G.C. Spencer* (No. 49)
40. Richard Childress* (No. 36)

* Driver failed to finish race

Preceded by 1973 Nashville 420	Winston Cup Series races 1971–2004	Succeeded by 1973 Capital City 500
Preceded by 1972	Southern 500 races 1973	Succeeded by 1974
