= 1969 Talladega 500 =

Auto race run in Alabama in 1969

Race details
- Race 44 of 54 in the 1969 NASCAR Grand National Series season
- 1969 Talladega 500 program cover
- Date: September 14, 1969
- Official name: Talladega 500
- Location: Alabama International Motor Speedway, Talladega, Alabama
- Course: Permanent racing facility
- Course length: 2.660 miles (4.280 km)
- Distance: 188 laps, 500.1 mi (804.8 km)
- Weather: Very hot with temperatures approaching 82.9 °F (28.3 °C); wind speeds up to 5.1 miles per hour (8.2 km/h)
- Average speed: 153.778 miles per hour (247.482 km/h)
- Attendance: 62,000

Pole position
Driver	Bobby Isaac	K&K Insurance Racing

Most laps led
Driver	Jim Vandiver	Ray Fox Racing
- Laps: 102

Winner
No. 99	Richard Brickhouse	Nichels Engineering

Television in the United States
- Network: untelevised
- Announcers: none

The inaugural race in the Talladega 500 (now Yellawood 500) series was held on September 14, 1969, at Alabama International Motor Speedway in Talladega, Alabama, USA. The race is noted for the unusual series of events leading up to and during it, seeing most Grand National Series drivers pulling out amidst a boycott of the event over safety concerns and an alleged scoring error in its finish creating a disputed victory for Richard Brickhouse. As a result, the race has been remarked as the worst in NASCAR's history.

== Background ==
Talladega Superspeedway – originally known as Alabama International Motor Superspeedway (AIMS) – is a motorsports complex located north of Talladega, Alabama. It is located on the former Anniston Air Force Base in the small city of Lincoln. The track is a tri-oval and was constructed by International Speedway Corporation, a business controlled by the France family, in the 1960s. Talladega is most known for its steep banking and the unique location of the start/finish line - located just past the exit to pit road. The track currently hosts the NASCAR series, such as the Cup Series, O'Reilly Auto Parts Series, and the Craftsman Truck Series. Talladega Superspeedway is the longest NASCAR oval, with a length of 2.66 miles (4.28 km), and the track at its peak had a seating capacity of 175,000 spectators.

== Summary ==
=== Tires controversy ===
The race is primarily remembered because all of the NASCAR stars from the Professional Driver Association (PDA), led by Richard Petty, boycotted the race due to tire failures during tire testing.

During tire testing, drivers reported handling problems with their cars. When checking their tires, drivers noticed that the tires were destroyed. The problem occurred throughout the garage. NASCAR was going through a "tire war" at the time, in which two competing tire manufacturers tried to convince teams and drivers to use their tires because they lasted longer, they gripped firmer, etc. Problems did occur with tire wars due to tire manufacturers sacrificing safety for the sake of speed and thus, more tire blowouts, which led to more injuries. Firestone and Goodyear, the two manufacturers that happened to be running in the race, flew in harder compound tires, which made the tires last longer. However, on Thursday, the next day, the same issues still happened, and the tires showed no improvements. The next day, on Friday, the drivers were becoming increasingly angry and frustrated. Firestone decided to pull out of the event and let the drivers pull out of their contracts for the race, allowing them to choose whichever tire they wished to run. However, Goodyear decided to stay, hoping to win the war and prove that their tires were better than Firestone's.

During all of this, drivers looked towards the PDA, essentially a union, and asked them what they should do. NASCAR president Bill France hated the PDA and unions in his sport (shown by his banning of Curtis Turner for trying to start a union in 1961, although by that time he had been reinstated in 1965), but couldn't do anything to ban them due to the major publicity it would cause. Instead, France never acknowledged that the PDA even existed. The PDA decided to complain to France about the issues they were having and talk about solutions. The PDA offered to postpone the race until a tire compound that could withstand the track was made. Bill France refused this idea, partly due to the fact that Alabama International Motor Speedway was barely completed before the race and that France needed his money back as quickly as possible. Throughout the garage, drivers talked about what they should do. Some hoped Goodyear could bring a tire soon, some wanted to continue the protests, and some even wanted to boycott the race. France would try to calm the drivers down by running a slower pony car than what the drivers had, running about at 160 mph when drivers were hitting much faster speeds. When drivers pointed out the speed difference, France said to the drivers, "Why don't you just run at that speed?" Drivers took this as a major insult, as they thought it undermined what they do and the fact that someone would break that rule anyway if they ran it. Sometime during Friday, France was talking to Bobby Allison and LeeRoy Yarbrough when France said to Allison, "I think you're just afraid to race." Per Allison, LeeRoy swung from behind and hit France in the face, putting him on the ground. LeeRoy would proceed to say to the drivers nearby, "Boys, pack up your stuff; we're leaving." Word quickly spread, and most of the PDA, with the exception of Richard Brickhouse (who was coerced by Chrysler to drive their new car), packed up and left. Jim Vandiver and Bobby Isaac, who were not with the PDA, proceeded to stay at the speedway.

Worried that the boycott would adversely affect the fan attendance, Bill France Sr. offered fans free admission to the 1970 Daytona 500 if they bought tickets to this race. Approximately 62,000 fans were in attendance on Sunday. France also decided to add that the drivers who ran in the preliminary 400-mile race, running slower cars, could also run in the feature race. On the morning before race day, Goodyear flew in a new set of tires that ran the entire race without failure.

Bobby Isaac won the pole for the race.

The race also introduced the Dodge Charger Daytona cars for the first time in the series. Richard Brickhouse won the race; it was his only victory in the Cup Series. Following the announcement that Brickhouse was the victor, Jim Vandiver protested that he had actually won the race.

John Hill, Jake Elder, Harry Hyde, and Mack Howard were the most notable crew chiefs to witness the race. The transition to purpose-built racecars began in the early 1960s and occurred gradually over that decade.

Jimmy Vaughn would record a 7th-place finish in his only NASCAR Cup series race, while future championship-winning owner Billy Hagan recorded his lone career Top 10 with an 8th-place finish.

The PDA disbanded soon after their boycott, with the next union-like organization in NASCAR not occurring again until the Race Team Alliance was formed in 2014.

=== Scoring debacle ===
Ray Fox and Jim Vandiver, whose No. 3 car finished second, were convinced that they actually lapped Brickhouse and won, but the win stood. The radio commentators also thought that Vandiver was in the lead, saying

Bob Smith: "Jim Vandiver in the lead! Here's, uh... Richard Brickhouse getting around Jim Vandiver as he goes around, so that gives him, uh... he's made up one of those laps, Ned.

Ned Jarrett: "That should put him back in the same lap with the leaders, Bob."

To the day he died, Vandiver believed that he won the race. Conspiracy theorists cite the difference in the Dodges as the determining factor since Jim was in an older Charger 500 and Brickhouse was in the brand-new, winged Dodge Daytona. Therefore, Chrysler talked Bill France into inventing a scoring error and showed that Brickhouse was the winner.

=== Drivers involved in the 1969 boycott ===
- Richard Petty (President of the PDA)
- David Pearson
- Bobby Allison
- Donnie Allison
- Cale Yarborough
- James Hylton
- Wendell Scott
- Buddy Baker
- Charlie Glotzbach
- LeeRoy Yarbrough
- Ramo Stott
- Jack Ingram
- Tiny Lund
- Bobby Johns
- John Sears
- Paul Goldsmith
- Dave Marcis

=== Results ===
Fin	St	#	Driver	Sponsor	Make	Laps	Led	Status
1	9	99	Richard Brickhouse	Nichels Engineering	'70 Dodge Daytona	188	33	running
2	2	3	Jim Vandiver	Ray Fox	'69 Dodge	188	102	running
3	12	14	Ramo Stott	Bill Ellis	'69 Dodge	188	4	running
4	1	71	Bobby Isaac	K & K Insurance	'69 Dodge	187	13	running
5	5	32	Dick Brooks		'69 Plymouth	180	2	running
6	11	26	Earl Brooks		'67 Ford	164	0	running
7	23	7	Jimmy Vaughn		'68 Chevrolet	159	0	running
8	29	52	Billy Hagan		'68 Mercury	155	0	running
9	13	53	Tiny Lund	Pepsi	'69 Ford	152	28	clutch
10	6	07	Coo Coo Marlin	Cunningham-Kelley	'69 Chevrolet	150	0	engine
11	18	81	Bill Ward	Bill Hemby	'68 Chevrolet	149	0	running
12	24	17	Ernie Shaw		'68 Ford	149	0	running
13	35	1	Amos Johnson		'68 Chevrolet	147	0	running
14	20	54	Bobby Fleming	Tommy Fleming	'68 Chevrolet	146	0	running
15	22	56	Ben Arnold	Jack Mercer	'68 Chevrolet	135	0	running
16	4	37	Don Tarr	Ray Fox	'67 Dodge	129	6	engine
17	16	21	Frank Sessoms		'68 Chevrolet	128	0	running
18	28	87	Buck Baker	H.B. Bailey	'69 Pontiac	108	0	engine
19	21	90	Dick Lawrence		'68 Chevrolet	108	0	running
20	14	0	Wilbur Pickett	Flo Starr	'68 Chevrolet	92	0	engine
21	31	98	Larry Bock	Larry Drover	'69 Dodge	85	0	engine
22	17	19	Stan Starr	Starr & Son	'68 Chevrolet	82	0	steering
23	26	13	Richard Childress		'68 Chevrolet	80	0	axle
24	15	04	C.B. Gwyn	C.B. Gwynn	'68 Mercury	73	0	engine
25	3	4	Jim Hurtubise	L.G. DeWitt	'69 Ford	63	0	engine
26	32	31	Earle Canavan		'69 Javelin	62	0	engine
27	8	62	Homer Newland	Kaye Engineering	'69 Dodge	53	0	engine
28	27	88	T.C. Hunt		'68 Chevrolet	53	0	rear end
29	7	9	Roy Tyner		'69 Pontiac	33	0	engine
30	34	46	J.W. King		'69 Ford	26	0	transmission
31	19	41	Bobby Brewer	Roscoe Leonard	'68 Chevrolet	9	0	engine
32	25	72	Al Straub		'69 Ford	9	0	frame
33	10	06	Les Snow	Neil Castles	'69 Dodge	2	0	frame
34	36	47	Bob Burcham		'68 Chevrolet	2	0	engine
35	33	74	Doug Easton	Al Straub	'68 Ford	0	0	driveshaft
36	30	16	Don Schissler	Bud Moore	'69 Mercury	0	0	

Preceded by 1969 Capital City 250	NASCAR Grand National races 1969	Succeeded by 1969 Sandlapper 200
