= Jerry Schild =

Racecar driver from Texas

- Born: September 1, 1954; Houston, Texas, U.S.
- Died: August 4, 2012 (aged 57); Tioga, North Dakota, U.S.

NASCAR Cup Series career
- Best finish: 1974 NASCAR Winston Cup Series season
- First race: 1974 Winston 500 (Talladega Superspeedway)
Wins	Top tens	Poles
	1

Jerry Schild (September 1, 1954 – August 4, 2012) was a NASCAR driver from Houston, Texas.

== Career ==
Schild was the son of local race car veteran Charles Ray and younger brother of Larry Schild. Jerry was well known in the series because he had been racing since the age of six. Starting from modest beginnings in go-karts, he began to build a reputation as a no-nonsense racer, a trait that he continued to bring to the seat of the Jerry Schild Racing team.

After several more years of competition on the go-kart circuits, he stepped up to the challenges of the NASCAR Late Model Sportsman features at Meyer Speedway. It was 1972, Schild was only 16 when he began driving full-time rookie for Rush Johnson. He placed third in point standings with top-five finishes in almost every race that year. The following year, he was second in points, again finishing top five most of the season. He worked his way up on the circuit eventually gain sponsorship from legendary A. J. Foyt, as well as Red Adair, continuously proving his exceptional driving abilities throughout several seasons to follow, earning many trophies for his sponsors.

In 1974, Schild made five Grand National appearances racing alongside such veterans as David Pearson, Benny Parsons, Richard Petty, Cale Yarborough, Bobby & Donnie Allison, Buddy Baker, Darrell Waltrip, and Harry Grant. The Darlington Southern 500 in September, resulted in an eighth-place finish, the best ever for a first-time competitor on the track. Cale Yarborough, winner of the race, was quoted as saying "a lot of veterans might do well to take driving lessons from teen-aged Jerry Schild."

Additional highlights of Schild's career include a first-place prize in the Texas Invitational Stock Car Classics, Texas World Speedway. More notable was his Busch competition at Daytona Speedway, qualifying fifth and finishing in 11th place.

Throughout the 1980s, Schild consistently raced hard on various other circuits including Midgets and Sprint cars (Texas Super Sprinters) on various dirt tracks in Texas. Afterward, he returned to asphalt, including another trip down Victory lane at the Lubri Lon Grand Prix at Texas World Speedway in the TIDA (Texas International Driver's Association). Schild competed in various Late Model Stock Car events in this decade.

In 2003, Schild won the Texas State Championship with the Texas Asphalt Modified Series, racing in Houston, Corpus Christi, San Antonio and Kyle, Texas. In 2004, he was second in state points with several wins. In 2005, he ran a limited schedule and placed sixth in state points. In 2006, Schild ran the Houston Modified series at Houston Motorsports Park and was the track champion in modified.

Schild continued to race at Houston Motorsports Park in the NASCAR WHELEN All American Series up until he was murdered in 2012.

Schild drove a total of 1,750.1 miles (2,816.5 km) in the top level of American stock car racing; the equivalent of 1142 laps. While starting in 26th place on average, Schild always improved on that by finishing in 22nd place. His only "top-ten" finish came at the 1974 Southern 500.

During his NASCAR career, Schild was frugal and didn't spend much money on racing essentials. His philosophy centered on "pure driving talent" as opposed to having first-tier materials as found with modern teams like Hendrick Motorsports and Joe Gibbs Racing.

In the 1974 NASCAR Winston Cup Series season, Schild's total career earnings was confirmed at US$8,396 ($54,811.94 when adjusted for inflation). Schild would typically compete in the No. 07 Chevrolet machine owned by Rush Johnson.

== Personal life ==
Schild was born and raised in Houston, Texas. He had one daughter named Lauren, who was 23 years old at the time of his death. Schild's former wife, Cindy Adams, said Schild wasn't someone random. "Jerry just isn't somebody who just got shot and died," she said. She said he had once donated a kidney to his sister. "He was an awesome person," she added. "My daughter idolized her father. That was her rock and her rock's gone. "In 2009, Jerry saved his sister's life by donating one of his kidneys to her. She was suffering from polycystic kidney disease and her kidneys were beginning to fail. After losing all function in one of her kidneys she was left with 10% in the other. Jerry was well-liked by everyone and will be remembered for being such a kind and generous person.
