= 1973 Alamo 500 =

Auto race run held at Texas World Speedway in 1973

Race details
- Race 14 of 28 in the 1973 NASCAR Winston Cup Series
- Layout of Texas World Speedway
- Date: June 10, 1973
- Official name: Alamo 500
- Location: Texas World Speedway, College Station, Texas
- Course: Permanent racing facility
- Course length: 2.000 miles (3.218 km)
- Distance: 250 laps, 500 mi (804 km)
- Weather: Warm with temperatures of 84.9 °F (29.4 °C); wind speeds of 15 miles per hour (24 km/h)
- Average speed: 142.144 mph (228.759 km/h)
- Attendance: 27,000

Pole position
Driver	Buddy Baker	K&K Insurance Racing

Most laps led
Driver	Buddy Baker	K&K Insurance Racing
- Laps: 168

Winner
No. 43	Richard Petty	Petty Enterprises

The 1973 Alamo 500 was a NASCAR Winston Cup Series racing event that took place on June 10, 1973, at Texas World Speedway in College Station, Texas. The race was won by Richard Petty, marking his fourth victory of the season and the 152nd of his career.

== Race report ==
It took 3 hours and 26 minutes to complete the 250-lap race. The average speed of the race was 142.114 miles per hour (228.710 km/h). Richard Petty defeated Darrell Waltrip by at least two laps in front of 27,000 people, while Waltrip was a further lap ahead of third-place Joe Frasson. Both Waltrip and Frasson recorded their best Cup Series finishes to date. While Frasson would never finish that high again, Waltrip would earn a total of 84 wins and 197 top three finishes during his Hall of Fame career.

The race saw 5 caution periods for 27 laps and 28 lead changes between 5 drivers. Buddy Baker started from the pole position after qualifying with a speed of 169.248 miles per hour (272.378 km/h). This would be the last Cup Series at Texas World Speedway until the 1979 NASCAR Winston Cup Series season. 38 drivers participated in the race, all American-born. Bob Whitlow and Ed Sczech made their NASCAR debuts at this event; former football player Whitlow was driving a second car for Ed Negre.

Richie Panch was the last-place finisher due to an ignition problem on the first lap. Winner Petty received a prize of $17,820 ($129,242 when considering inflation) while Panch collected a mere $920 for finishing in last place ($6,672 when considering inflation).

Notable crew chiefs in this race were Tim Brewer, Jake Elder, Travis Carter, Harry Hyde, Dale Inman, and Bud Moore.

=== Qualifying ===
Grid	No.	Driver	Manufacturer	Owner
1	71	Buddy Baker	'73 Dodge	Nord Krauskopf
2	43	Richard Petty	'73 Dodge	Petty Enterprises
3	11	Cale Yarborough	'73 Chevrolet	Richard Howard
4	95	Darrell Waltrip	'71 Mercury	Darrell Waltrip
5	15	Bobby Isaac	'73 Ford	Bud Moore
6	18	Joe Frasson	'73 Dodge	Joe Frasson
7	24	Cecil Gordon	'72 Chevrolet	Cecil Gordon
8	14	Coo Coo Marlin	'72 Chevrolet	H.B. Cunningham
9	72	Benny Parsons	'73 Chevrolet	L.G. DeWitt
10	42	Marty Robbins	'73 Dodge	Marty Robbins

== Finishing order ==
1. Richard Petty (No. 43)
2. Darrell Waltrip (No. 95)
3. Joe Frasson† (No. 11)
4. Cale Yarborough† (No. 18)
5. Cecil Gordon (No. 24)
6. Buddy Baker† (No. 71)
7. Benny Parsons† (No. 72)
8. Ramo Stott (No. 9)
9. David Sisco (No. 05)
10. J.D. McDuffie† (No. 70)
11. H.B. Bailey† (No. 36)
12. Jabe Thomas (No. 25)
13. Frank Warren (No. 79)
14. Bill Champion† (No. 10)
15. James Hylton† (No. 48)
16. Walter Ballard (No. 30)
17. Buddy Arrington (No. 67)
18. Charlie Roberts (No. 77)
19. Henley Gray (No. 19)
20. Ed Sczech* (No. 61)
21. Bob Whitlow (No. 08)
22. Dean Dalton (No. 7)
23. Tony Bettenhausen Jr.*† (No. 38)
24. Lennie Pond* (No. 54)
25. Raymond Williams* (No. 47)
26. Bobby Allison* (No. 12)
27. Elmo Langley*† (No. 64)
28. Coo Coo Marlin*† (No. 14)
29. Marty Robbins*† (No. 42)
30. Jimmy Crawford*† (No. 22)
31. D.K. Ulrich* (No. 40)
32. Bobby Isaac*† (No. 15)
33. Dave Marcis* (No. 2)
34. Rick Newsom*† (No. 20)
35. Richard Childress* (No. 96)
36. Mel Larson* (No. 04)
37. Ed Negre* (No. 8)
38. Richie Panch*† (No. 98)

† signifies that the driver is known to be deceased
* Driver failed to finish race

Preceded by 1973 Gwyn Staley 400	Richard Petty's Career Wins; 1960-1984	Succeeded by 1973 Capital City 500
