= 1975 Winston 500 =

Auto race held at Talladega Superspeedway in 1975

Race details
- Race 10 of 30 in the 1975 NASCAR Winston Cup Series season
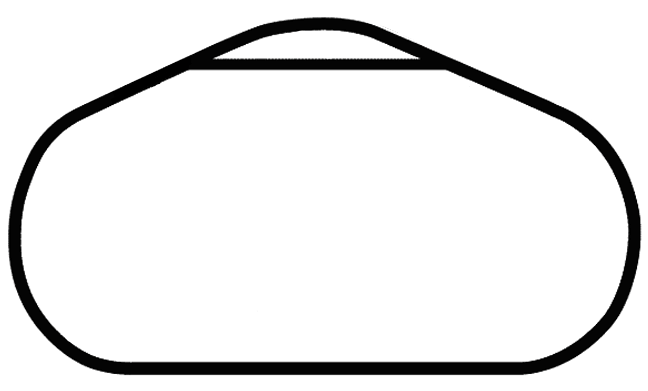
- Layout of Talladega Superspeedway
- Date: May 4, 1975
- Official name: Winston 500
- Location: Alabama International Motor Speedway, Talladega, Alabama
- Course: Permanent racing facility
- Course length: 2.660 miles (4.280 km)
- Distance: 188 laps, 500.1 mi (804.8 km)
- Weather: Temperatures of 80.1 °F (26.7 °C); wind speeds of 9.9 miles per hour (15.9 km/h)
- Average speed: 144.948 miles per hour (233.271 km/h)
- Attendance: 65,000

Pole position
Driver	Buddy Baker	Bud Moore Engineering

Most laps led
Driver	Buddy Baker	Bud Moore Engineering
- Laps: 99

Winner
No. 15	Buddy Baker	Bud Moore Engineering

Television in the United States
- Network: CBS
- Announcers: Ken Squier

The 1975 Winston 500 was an automobile race at the Alabama International Motor Speedway on May 4, 1975.

The tenth race of 30 in the 1975 NASCAR Winston Cup Grand National season, it started 50 cars and ran 500.1 miles. It was the sixth annual late-April/early May running at Talladega and the fifth under Winston cigarettes sponsorship.

== Background ==
Talladega Superspeedway, originally known as Alabama International Motor Superspeedway (AIMS), is a motorsports complex located north of Talladega, Alabama. It is located on the former Anniston Air Force Base in the small city of Lincoln. The track is a Tri-oval and was constructed by International Speedway Corporation, a business controlled by the France Family, in the 1960s. Talladega is most known for its steep banking and the unique location of the start/finish line - located just past the exit to pit road. The track currently hosts the NASCAR series such as the Cup Series, Xfinity Series, and the Craftsman Truck Series. Talladega Superspeedway is the longest NASCAR oval with a length of 2.66 miles (4.28 km), and the track at its peak had a seating capacity of 175,000 spectators.

== Race report ==
Five-time Formula One World Driver Champion Juan Manuel Fangio (Argentina, 1951, 1954–57) was the honorary starter for the event. Ed Negre drove Dean Dalton's car, and Dean Dalton drove Ed Negre's car.

The pole and race were won by Buddy Baker, driving the 1975 Ford Torino of Bud Moore. Buddy Baker's win the first for Ford in NASCAR's "Modern Era." It snapped a long losing streak for the brand dating back to Bobby Allison's win at Middle Georgia Raceway back in November 1971. This race brought on the best finish of Harry Jefferson who finished in sixth place.

His primary challengers were Bobby Allison, David Pearson, Richard Petty, Dick Brooks, Dave Marcis, and Darrell Waltrip.

The race lead changed 51 times among 11 drivers and was slowed by five cautions for 45 laps. There were several accidents. Baker dominated in terms of laps led, but he didn't have the best car. Cale Yarborough rocketed through the field from 24th starting spot until his windshield kept breaking. Petty was one of the best cars along with Pearson. Cecil "Flash" Gordon led a couple laps early in this race when he stayed out and the leaders pitted. The #24 Chevrolet wasn't upfront for long as Dick Brooks and Darrell Waltrip passed him not long after the restart. Gordon's good run eventually ended in a blown engine that saw him spun in his own oil and slide into the infield off Turn 4.

Owens's body falls to the ground

Donnie Allison blew his engine while leading Lap 12 and a two-car crash ensued; among those involved were Daytona 500 winner Benny Parsons. Later Marty Robbins was involved in a fiery crash with Ramo Stott and James Hylton. The worst accident happened to Richard Petty. On Lap 141 while leading his left-front wheel bearing caught fire. He pitted while his young brother-in-law Randy Owens was fitting a hose to a pressurized water tank; the tank exploded high into the air and landed several yards from Petty, killing Owens. Another unusual event was Darrell Waltrip finishing in the top five despite being put out with engine problems on lap 182. Baker crowded off a last-lap bid by Pearson for the win, his first since 1973 and the first for team owner Bud Moore since 1966.

The winner of the race won $28,275 ($169,178 when adjusted for inflation) while the last-place driver walked away with $905 ($5,415 when adjusted for inflation).

=== Top 10 finishers ===
Pos	Grid	No.	Driver	Manufacturer	Laps	Laps led	Points	Time/Status
1	1	15	Buddy Baker	'75 Ford	188	99	185	3:26:59
2	4	21	David Pearson	'73 Mercury	188	27	175	+1 car length
3	7	90	Dick Brooks	'73 Ford	188	6	170	Lead lap under green flag
4	22	17	Darrell Waltrip	'75 Chevrolet	182	6	165	Engine failure
5	24	14	Coo Coo Marlin	'75 Chevrolet	182	8	160	+6 laps
6	15	95	Harry Jefferson	'73 Ford	181	0	150	+7 laps
7	23	41	Grant Adcox	'75 Chevrolet	181	0	146	+7 laps
8	38	37	Bruce Jacobi	'75 Chevrolet	180	0	142	+8 laps
9	14	60	Joe Mihalic	'75 Chevrolet	179	0	138	+9 laps
10	18	96	Richard Childress	'75 Chevrolet	177	0	134	+13 laps

== Standings after the race ==
Pos	Driver	Points
1	Richard Petty	1598
2 ▲	Dave Marcis	1359
3	James Hylton	1301
4 ▼	Benny Parsons	1296
5 ▲	Darrell Waltrip	1279
6 ▼	Cecil Gordon	1276
7 ▼	Richard Childress	1264
8	Dick Brooks	1225
9 ▲	David Pearson	1124
10 ▲	Buddy Baker	1123

Preceded by 1975 Virginia 500	NASCAR Winston Cup Season; 1975	Succeeded by 1975 Music City USA 420
Preceded by 1974 Winston 500	Talladega spring race 1975	Succeeded by 1976 Winston 500
