= 1978 NAPA National 500 =

Auto race held at Charlotte Motor Speedway in 1978

Race details
- Race 27 of 30 in the 1978 NASCAR Winston Cup Series season
- Layout of Charlotte Motor Speedway
- Date: October 8, 1978
- Official name: NAPA National 600
- Location: Charlotte Motor Speedway, Concord, North Carolina
- Course: Permanent racing facility
- Course length: 1.500 miles (2.414 km)
- Distance: 334 laps, 500 mi (865 km)
- Weather: Chilly with temperatures of 66 °F (19 °C); wind speeds of 12 miles per hour (19 km/h)
- Average speed: 141.846 miles per hour (228.279 km/h)

Pole position
Driver	David Pearson	Wood Brothers Racing

Most laps led
Driver	Bobby Allison	Bud Moore Engineering
- Laps: 108

Winner
No. 72	Bobby Allison	Bud Moore Engineering

Television in the United States
- Network: ABC
- Announcers: Jim McKay; Chris Economaki

The 1978 NAPA National 500 was a NASCAR Winston Cup Series racing event held on October 8, 1978, at Charlotte Motor Speedway in Concord, North Carolina.

The #96 Ford was qualified and driven by Dale Earnhardt. Baxter Price only started the race to preserve Dale's status as a rookie for 1979 (NASCAR rules allow a driver to make five starts in a previous year).

== Background ==
Charlotte Motor Speedway was designed and built by Bruton Smith and partner and driver Curtis Turner in 1959. The first World 600 NASCAR race was held at the 1.5 mi (2.4 km) speedway on June 19, 1960. On December 8, 1961, the speedway filed bankruptcy notice. Judge J.B. Craven of US District Court for Western North Carolina reorganized it under Chapter 10 of the Bankruptcy Act; Judge Craven appointed Robert "Red" Robinson as the track's trustee until March 1962. At that point, a committee of major stockholders in the speedway was assembled, headed by A.C. Goines and furniture store owner Richard Howard. Goines, Howard, and Robinson worked to secure loans and other monies to keep the speedway afloat.

By April 1963 some $750,000 was paid to twenty secured creditors and the track emerged from bankruptcy; Judge Craven appointed Goines as speedway president and Howard as assistant general manager of the speedway, handling its day-to-day operations. By 1964 Howard become the track's general manager, and on June 1, 1967, the speedway's mortgage was paid in full; a public burning of the mortgage was held at the speedway two weeks later.

Smith departed from the speedway in 1962 to pursue other business interests, primarily in banking and auto dealerships from his new home of Rockford, IL. He became quite successful and began buying out shares of stock in the speedway. By 1974 Smith was more heavily involved in the speedway, to where Richard Howard by 1975 stated, "I haven't been running the speedway. It's being run from Illinois." In 1975 Smith had become the majority stockholder, regaining control of its day-to-day operations. Smith hired H.A. "Humpy" Wheeler as general manager in October 1975, and on January 29, 1976, Richard Howard resigned as president and GM of the speedway.

== Race report ==
The race was held on a dry circuit; with no precipitation recorded around the speedway. Glenn Jarrett, the brother of Dale Jarrett, and the son of Ned Jarrett, made his NASCAR Winston Cup Series debut in the race.

The race was contested by 40 drivers in front of a crowd of 80,000 spectators. Bobby Fisher suffered an engine failure on lap 3 and finished in last place. Butch Mock finished 80 laps behind the leaders, the lowest-placed driver to complete the race. Mock would drive two more career races before sticking to just owning the #75 car.

In his fourth start, Terry Labonte finished outside the top ten for the first time due to an engine failure on lap 293. Skip Manning returns to the Winston Cup ranks for the first time in seven races after losing his ride in Billy Hagen's #92 to Terry Labonte. Manning did a one-off here in Robert Gee's #8 Autowize Chevrolet but a blown engine very early on sent him to the sidelines and resulted in a bad finish.

Bobby Allison achieved his 50th career victory, defeating Darrell Waltrip by just over 30 seconds after more than three and a half hours of racing. Allison won both the Cup race and the World Service Life 300 Sportsman race that weekend. The race featured 40 lead changes among drivers including Allison, Cale Yarborough, and Richard Petty. Dick Brooks suffered a fuel pump failure on lap 325, preventing a top-five finish.

Richard Petty finished 27th after qualifying in the top ten.

The average speed of the race was 141.826 miles per hour (228.247 km/h). David Pearson earned his 12th consecutive pole position at Charlotte Motor Speedway. The majority of the field drove Ford and Chevrolet vehicles. All competing drivers were from the United States. Individual race earnings for each driver ranged from the winner's share of $40,000 ($197,449 when adjusted for inflation) to the last-place finisher's purse of $895 ($4,418 when adjusted for inflation). Total driver earnings handed out by NASCAR officials for this event was finalized at $259,980 ($1,283,320 when adjusted for inflation).

=== Qualifying ===
Grid	No.	Driver	Manufacturer
1	21	David Pearson	Mercury
2	11	Cale Yarborough	Oldsmobile
3	72	Benny Parsons	Oldsmobile
4	54	Lennie Pond	Chevrolet
5	1	Donnie Allison	Chevrolet
6	14	Coo Coo Marlin	Chevrolet
7	12	Harry Gant	Chevrolet
8	15	Bobby Allison	Ford
9	43	Richard Petty	Chevrolet
10	88	Darrell Waltrip	Chevrolet
11	27	Buddy Baker	Chevrolet
12	2	Dave Marcis	Chevrolet
13	22	Ricky Rudd	Chevrolet
14	90	Dick Brooks	Mercury
15	05	Bruce Hill	Oldsmobile
16	92	Terry Labonte	Chevrolet
17	5	Neil Bonnett	Chevrolet
18	19	Bill Dennis	Chevrolet
19	3	Richard Childress	Oldsmobile
20	00	John Utsman	Chevrolet
21	71	Bobby Fisher	Chevrolet
22	70	J.D. McDuffie	Chevrolet
23	16	Glenn Jarrett	Oldsmobile
24	64	Tommy Gale	Ford
25	96	Baxter Price	Ford
26	9	Bill Elliott	Mercury
27	79	Frank Warren	Dodge
28	8	Skip Manning	Chevrolet
29	41	Grant Adcox	Chevrolet
30	99	Dick Trickle	Ford

== Top 10 finishers ==
Pos	Grid	No.	Driver	Manufacturer	Laps	Laps led	Points	Time/Status
1	8	15	Bobby Allison	Ford	334	108	185	3:31:57
2	10	88	Darrell Waltrip	Chevrolet	334	4	175	+30.2 seconds
3	12	2	Dave Marcis	Chevrolet	334	5	170	Lead lap under green flag
4	5	1	Donnie Allison	Chevrolet	334	15	165	Lead lap under green flag
5	1	21	David Pearson	Mercury	333	35	160	+1 lap
6	4	54	Lennie Pond	Chevrolet	330	0	150	+4 laps
7	6	14	Coo Coo Marlin	Chevrolet	330	3	151	+4 laps
8	34	57	Dick May	Ford	326	0	142	+8 laps
9	19	3	Richard Childress	Oldsmobile	325	0	138	+12 laps
10	14	90	Dick Brooks	Mercury	325	0	134	Fuel pump problems

== Standings after the race ==
Pos	Driver	Points	Differential
1	Cale Yarborough	4334	0
2 ▲	Darrell Waltrip	3953	-381
3 ▲	Dave Marcis	3936	-398
4 ▼	Benny Parsons	3878	-456
5	Bobby Allison	3857	-477
6	Richard Petty	3553	-781
7	Lennie Pond	3442	-892
8	Dick Brooks	3344	-990
9	Buddy Arrington	3315	-1019
10	Richard Childress	3229	-1105

Preceded by 1978 Wilkes 400	NASCAR Winston Cup Series Season; 1978	Succeeded by 1978 American 500

Preceded by 1977	NAPA National 500 races 1978	Succeeded by 1979
