= Travis Carter =

American NASCAR crew chief and team owner (1949–2025)

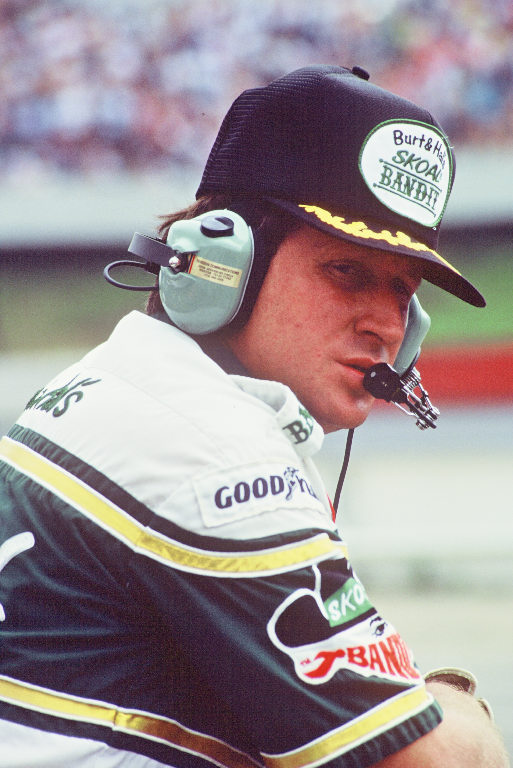
- Carter at a race in the 1980s
- Born: November 21, 1949; Ellerbe, North Carolina, U.S.
- Died: June 10, 2025 (aged 75); Huntersville, North Carolina, U.S.

NASCAR Grand National East Series career
- 3 races run over 1 year
- Best finish: 32nd (1973)
- First race: 1973 Sunoco 260 (Hickory)
- Last race: 1973 Tar Heel 200 (Fayetteville)
Wins	Top tens	Poles
0	1	0

Travis Aaron Carter (November 21, 1949 – June 10, 2025) was an American car owner and crew chief in the NASCAR Winston Cup Series. He served as crew chief for two decades, winning a championship with Benny Parsons in 1973. Carter was the winning crew chief when Parsons won the 1975 Daytona 500. He owned Travis Carter Motorsports from 1990 to 2003. He was the uncle of NASCAR crew chief Larry Carter, and the father of NASCAR driver Matt Carter.

Carter died on June 10, 2025, at the age of 75.
