= Bob Whitlow =

American football player (1936–2020)

No. 66, 61, 51, 53
- Position: Center

Personal information
- Born: February 15, 1936; Shelbyville, Indiana, U.S.
- Died: October 23, 2020 (aged 84); Forsyth County, Georgia, U.S.
- Listed height: 6 ft 2 in (1.88 m)
- Listed weight: 236 lb (107 kg)

Career information
- High school: Bloomington (IN)
- College: Indiana; Arizona
- NFL draft: 1960: undrafted

Career history
- Chicago Bears (1960)*; Washington Redskins (1960–1961); Detroit Lions (1961–1965); Atlanta Falcons (1966); Los Angeles Rams (1967)*; Pittsburgh Steelers (1968)*; Cleveland Browns (1968)
- * Offseason or practice squad member only

Awards and highlights
- Indiana Football Hall of Fame (2000); Monroe County, Indiana Sports Hall of Fame (2012)

Career NFL statistics
- Games played: 100
- Games started: 38
- Fumble recoveries: 1
- Stats at Pro Football Reference

Robert Edward Whitlow (February 15, 1936 – October 23, 2020) was an American professional football player who was a center in the National Football League (NFL) for the Washington Redskins, Detroit Lions, Atlanta Falcons, and Cleveland Browns. He played college football for the Arizona Wildcats.

== Early life ==
Whitlow was born in Shelbyville, Indiana and attended Bloomington High School in Bloomington, Indiana, where he played high school football and participated in track and field as a shot putter.

== College and military career ==
After high school, Whitlow attended and played college football at Compton Junior College in Compton, California, before transferring to the University of Arizona. He was also a shot putter in college. He left college in 1957 and enlisted in the United States Marine Corps.

== Professional career ==
After serving with the Marines, Whitlow qualified for the Summer Olympics trials in shot put, but decided to play football instead. He signed with the Chicago Bears in 1960, but was then traded to the Washington Redskins. Midway through the 1961 season, he was traded to the Detroit Lions, where he played through 1965 and played every offensive down in 1962 and 1963. Whitlow was then traded to the Atlanta Falcons during their inaugural 1966 season. He was then traded to the Los Angeles Rams for undisclosed draft picks, but never played for the Rams. In 1968, he was signed by the Pittsburgh Steelers, but was waived before the end of the offseason. He was then signed by the Cleveland Browns and played for them for one season snapping for all placekicks and punts, but then had to retire after a hernia operation. He attempted to make a comeback in 1974 with the World Football League's Portland Storm, but failed.

During the Lions' 1963 season, Whitlow was the center for George Plimpton when Plimpton was practicing and playing with the team for the Sports Illustrated article that became the book Paper Lion.

== Racing career ==
Bob Whitlow

NASCAR Cup Series career
- 2 races run over 2 years
- Best finish: 92nd (1973)
- First race: 1973 Alamo 500 (Texas World)
- Last race: 1974 Yankee 400 (Michigan)
Wins	Top tens	Poles
0	0	0

A longtime racing fan who idolized Richard Petty and A. J. Foyt, Whitlow became interested in dabbling in a racing career when he was still with the Lions, though the team and his wife forbade him from pursuing it. After retiring from football, he purchased a 1970 Dodge Charger and received a helmet from New Orleans Saints owner John W. Mecom Jr., who previously ran the Mecom Racing Team. He raced with No. 51 as a nod to his number from his playing days.

Whitlow explained in July 1973 that "racing and football have some of the same organizations. You've got to have organization to win in either sport. You've got to think about what you're going to do, and you have to be able to analyze what you're doing wrong." Otherwise, he stressed "there is simply no comparison" between the two sports.

Whitlow made his racing debut in United States Auto Club (USAC) stock cars at Texas World Speedway in April 1973, where he finished 20th and 20 laps behind winner Gordon Johncock. In June, he entered the NASCAR Winston Cup Series race there in a Ford Torino and placed 21st.

== Coaching career ==
Whitlow was an assistant basketball coach for two seasons at Oakland Community College from 1986 to 1988. Whitlow was the head basketball coach at Madonna College from 1988 to 1989, posting a 13–17 record. He was a track and field coach at Northview High School in Johns Creek, Georgia.

== Personal life ==
Between his retirement from football and beginning a racing career, Whitlow worked for a carpet business.

Whitlow died on October 23, 2020, in Forsyth County, Georgia at age 84.

== Motorsports career results ==
=== NASCAR ===
(key) (Bold – Pole position awarded by qualifying time. Italics – Pole position earned by points standings or practice time. * – Most laps led.)

==== Winston Cup Series ====
NASCAR Winston Cup Series results
Year	Team	No.	Make	1	2	3	4	5	6	7	8	9	10	11	12	13	14	15	16	17	18	19	20	21	22	23	24	25	26	27	28	29	30	NWCC	Pts	Ref
1973	Negre Racing	08	Ford	RSD	DAY	RCH	CAR	BRI	ATL	NWS	DAR	MAR	TAL	NSV	CLT	DOV	TWS; 21	RSD	MCH	DAY	BRI	ATL	TAL	NSV	DAR	RCH	DOV	NWS	MAR	CLT	CAR			92nd	0	
1974	Whitlow Racing	51	Dodge	RSD	DAY	RCH	CAR	BRI	ATL	DAR	NWS	MAR	TAL	NSV	DOV	CLT	RSD	MCH	DAY	BRI	NSV	ATL	POC	TAL	MCH; 19	DAR	RCH	DOV	NWS	MAR	CLT	CAR	ONT	NA	-	
