= Pee Wee Wentz =

American racing driver (born 1941)

Pee Wee Wentz (Jerry E. Wentz, Jr.)
- Born: October 6, 1941 (age 85); Danville, Virginia, U.S.

NASCAR Cup Series career
- 6 races run over 3 years
- Best finish: 73rd - 1974 NASCAR Winston Cup Series season
- First race: 1971 West Virginia 500 (International Raceway Park)
- Last race: 1974 Old Dominion 500 (Martinsville Speedway)
Wins	Top tens	Poles
0	1	0

Jerry E. "Pee Wee" Wentz Jr. (born October 6, 1941, in Danville, Virginia, USA) is a retired NASCAR Winston Cup Series driver. He has done a grand total of 1234 laps and 1,167.9 miles (1,879.6 km) of total NASCAR Cup Series experience. While his average starts were in 30th place, Wentz often did better at the conclusion of races by finishing an average of 24th place. From the age of 30 to 33, Wentz was a late bloomer to the world of motorsports. Most drivers begin a serious pro stock car racing career between the ages of 16 and 19.

== Motorsports career results ==
=== NASCAR ===
(key) (Bold – Pole position awarded by qualifying time. Italics – Pole position earned by points standings or practice time. * – Most laps led.)

==== Winston Cup Series ====
NASCAR Winston Cup Series results
Year	Team	No.	Make	1	2	3	4	5	6	7	8	9	10	11	12	13	14	15	16	17	18	19	20	21	22	23	24	25	26	27	28	29	30	31	32	33	34	35	36	37	38	39	40	41	42	43	44	45	46	47	48	NGNC	Pts	Ref
1971	Wentz Racing	5	Chevy	RSD	DAY	DAY	DAY	ONT	RCH	CAR	HCY	BRI	ATL	CLB	GPS	SMR	NWS	MAR	DAR	SBO	TAL	ASH	KPT	CLT	DOV	MCH	RSD	HOU	GPS	DAY	BRI	AST	ISP	TRN	NSV	ATL	BGS	ONA; 28	MCH	TAL	CLB	HCY	DAR	MAR	CLT	DOV	CAR	MGR	RCH	NWS	TWS	NA	NA	
1973		04	Chevy	RSD	DAY	RCH	CAR	BRI	ATL	NWS	DAR	MAR	TAL	NSV	CLT	DOV	TWS	RSD	MCH	DAY	BRI	ATL	TAL	NSV	DAR	RCH	DOV	NWS	MAR; 27	CLT	CAR; 26																					78th	NA	
1974	Wentz Racing	4	Chevy	RSD	DAY; DNQ	RCH	CAR	BRI	ATL	DAR; 31	NWS	MAR	TAL	NSV	DOV	CLT	RSD	MCH	DAY	BRI	NSV	ATL	POC	TAL	MCH		RCH	DOV	NWS	MAR; 23	CLT	CAR	ONT																			73rd	5.94	
1974	Arrington Racing	67	Plymouth																							DAR; 10																										73rd	5.94	

===== Daytona 500 =====
Year	Team	Manufacturer	Start	Finish
1974	Wentz Racing	Chevrolet	DNQ	
