= Dick Skillen =

American racing driver (born 1945)

- Born: August 5, 1945 (age 81); Claremont, New Hampshire, U.S.

NASCAR Cup Series career
- 17 races run over 9 years
- Best finish: 49th (1975)
- First race: 1974 Carolina 500 (Rockingham)
- Last race: 1985 Winston 500 (Talladega)
Wins	Top tens	Poles
0	1	0

ARCA Menards Series career
- 1 race run over 1 year
- First race: 1986 Talladega ARCA 500K (Talladega)
Wins	Top tens	Poles
0	0	0
- Statistics up to date as of October 31, 2024.

Dick Skillen (born August 5, 1945) is an American former professional stock car racing driver who has previously competed in the NASCAR Winston Cup Series, where he ran from 1974 to 1986 and achieved a best finish of seventeenth at Daytona International Speedway in 1976.

Skillen has also competed in the ARCA Permatex SuperCar Series.

== Motorsports career results ==
=== NASCAR ===
(key) (Bold - Pole position awarded by qualifying time. Italics - Pole position earned by points standings or practice time. * – Most laps led.)

==== Winston Cup Series ====
NASCAR Winston Cup Series results
Year	Team	No.	Make	1	2	3	4	5	6	7	8	9	10	11	12	13	14	15	16	17	18	19	20	21	22	23	24	25	26	27	28	29	30	31	NWCC	Pts	Ref
1974	Goff Racing	78	Chevy	RSD	DAY; DNQ	RCH	CAR; 21	BRI	ATL	DAR; 25	NWS	MAR	TAL	NSV	DOV	CLT; 18	RSD	MCH	DAY	BRI	NSV	ATL	POC	TAL	MCH	DAR; Wth	RCH	DOV	NWS	MAR	CLT	CAR	ONT		66th	9.645	
1975	Goff Racing	78	Chevy	RSD	DAY	RCH	CAR; 30	BRI	ATL	NWS	DAR; 23	MAR	TAL	NSV	DOV	CLT; 25	RSD	MCH	DAY	NSV	POC	TAL	MCH	DAR; 37	DOV	NWS	MAR	CLT	RCH	CAR; 27	BRI	ATL	ONT		49th	389	
1976	Goff Racing	78	Chevy	RSD	DAY; 31	CAR	RCH	BRI	ATL	NWS	DAR; 21	MAR	TAL; 21	NSV	DOV	CLT	RSD	MCH	DAY; 17	NSV	POC	TAL; 30	MCH	BRI	DAR	RCH	DOV	MAR	NWS	CLT	CAR	ATL	ONT		51st	455	
1977	Goff Racing	78	Chevy	RSD	DAY; DNQ	RCH	CAR	ATL	NWS	DAR	BRI	MAR	TAL; 36	NSV	DOV	CLT	RSD	MCH	DAY	NSV	POC	TAL	MCH	BRI	DAR	RCH	DOV	MAR	NWS	CLT	CAR	ATL	ONT		115th	55	
1980	Ulrich Racing	40	Buick	RSD	DAY	RCH	CAR	ATL	BRI	DAR	NWS	MAR	TAL; 28	NSV	DOV	CLT	TWS	RSD	MCH	DAY	NSV	POC	TAL	MCH	BRI	DAR	RCH	DOV	NWS	MAR	CLT	CAR	ATL	ONT	98th	79	
1982	Goff Racing	78	Pontiac	DAY; DNQ	RCH	BRI	ATL	CAR	DAR	NWS	MAR	TAL	NSV	DOV	CLT	POC	RSD	MCH	DAY	NSV	POC	TAL	MCH	BRI	DAR	RCH	DOV	NWS	CLT	MAR	CAR	ATL	RSD		N/A	0	
1983	Goff Racing	78	Pontiac	DAY; DNQ	RCH	CAR	ATL	DAR	NWS	MAR	TAL	NSV	DOV	BRI	CLT	RSD	POC	MCH	DAY	NSV	POC	TAL; 40	MCH	BRI	DAR	RCH	DOV	MAR	NWS	CLT	CAR	ATL	RSD		102nd	43	
1985	Goff Racing	79	Chevy	DAY; DNQ	RCH	CAR	ATL	BRI	DAR	NWS	MAR	TAL; 18	DOV	CLT; DNQ	RSD	POC	MCH	DAY; DNQ	POC	TAL; DNQ	MCH	BRI	DAR	RCH	DOV	MAR	NWS	CLT	CAR	ATL	RSD				76th	109	
1986	Goff Racing	60	Chevy	DAY; DNQ	RCH	CAR	ATL	BRI	DAR	NWS	MAR	TAL; DNQ	DOV	CLT	RSD	POC	MCH	DAY	POC	TAL	GLN	MCH	BRI	DAR	RCH	DOV	MAR	NWS	CLT	CAR	ATL	RSD			N/A	0	

===== Daytona 500 =====
Year	Team	Manufacturer	Start	Finish
1974	Goff Racing	Chevrolet	DNQ	
1976	Goff Racing	Chevrolet	28	31
1977	Goff Racing	Chevrolet	DNQ	
1982	Goff Racing	Chevrolet	DNQ	
1983	Goff Racing	Chevrolet	DNQ	
1985	Goff Racing	Chevrolet	DNQ	
1986	Goff Racing	Chevrolet	DNQ	

=== ARCA Permatex SuperCar Series ===
(key) (Bold – Pole position awarded by qualifying time. Italics – Pole position earned by points standings or practice time. * – Most laps led.)

ARCA Permatex SuperCar Series results
Year	Team	No.	Make	1	2	3	4	5	6	7	8	9	10	11	12	13	14	15	16	APSSC	Pts	Ref
1986	Goff Racing	60	Chevy	ATL	DAY	ATL	TAL; 32	SIR	SSP	FRS	KIL	CSP	TAL	BLN	ISF	DSF	TOL	MCS	ATL	N/A	0	
