= David Sisco =

Racecar driver from Tennessee

- Sisco, c. 1970
- Born: June 26, 1937; Hohenwald, Tennessee, U.S.
- Died: July 25, 2016 (aged 79); Bon Aqua, Tennessee, U.S.
- Cause of death: Alzheimer's
- Awards: 1969 Nashville Fairgrounds track champion

NASCAR Cup Series career
- 133 over races run over 7 years
- Best finish: 10th (1974)
- First race: 1971 Winston 500 (Talladega)
- Last race: 1977 Talladega 500 (Talladega)
Wins	Top tens	Poles
0	31	0

David Sisco (June 26, 1937 – July 25, 2016) was an American NASCAR Winston Cup Series driver who ran 133 races from 1971 to 1977, and was the 1969 Nashville Fairgrounds track champion. He was inducted into the Nashville Fairgrounds Speedway Hall of Fame in 2023.

== Career ==
Sisco also managed to earn $251,359 in his seven-year NASCAR career ($1,335,474.09 when considering inflation ). His average starting position is 22nd place while he managed to finish in 19th place on average. Total mileage of all of Sisco's races are 39,186.7 miles (63,064.9 km). Prior to 1971, Sisco participated in a select number of late model stock car races and was the champion of one of them in 1969.

The type of tracks that best favored Sisco were flat tracks; where he would finish an average of 13th place. He did not excel on restrictor plate tracks, however, and a finish of 23rd place would become routine for Sisco during his NASCAR Cup Series career.

== Motorsports career results ==
=== NASCAR ===
(key) (Bold – Pole position awarded by qualifying time. Italics – Pole position earned by points standings or practice time. * – Most laps led.)

==== Grand National Series ====
NASCAR Grand National Series results
Year	Team	No.	Make	1	2	3	4	5	6	7	8	9	10	11	12	13	14	15	16	17	18	19	20	21	22	23	24	25	26	27	28	29	30	31	32	33	34	35	36	37	38	39	40	41	42	43	44	45	46	47	48	NGNC	Pts	Ref
1971	McGee Racing	05	Chevy	RSD	DAY	DAY	DAY	ONT	RCH	CAR	HCY	BRI	ATL	CLB	GPS	SMR	NWS	MAR	DAR	SBO	TAL; 31	ASH	KPT	CLT	DOV	MCH	RSD	HOU	GPS	DAY	BRI	AST	ISP	TRN	NSV; 19	ATL	BGS	ONA	MCH	TAL; 16	CLB	HCY	DAR	MAR	CLT	DOV	CAR	MGR; 15	RCH	NWS	TWS	57th	309	

==== Winston Cup Series ====
NASCAR Winston Cup Series results
Year	Team	No.	Make	1	2	3	4	5	6	7	8	9	10	11	12	13	14	15	16	17	18	19	20	21	22	23	24	25	26	27	28	29	30	31	NWCC	Pts	Ref
1972	McGee Racing	05	Chevy	RSD	DAY; 7	RCH	ONT	CAR	ATL; 37	BRI; 23	DAR	NWS	MAR	TAL; 37	CLT	DOV	MCH; 15	RSD	TWS	DAY; 29	BRI; 24	TRN	ATL; DNQ	TAL; 17	MCH; 13	NSV; 17	DAR	RCH	DOV	MAR	NWS	CLT	CAR; 9	TWS; 27	33rd	2310.75	
1973	McGee Racing	05	Chevy	RSD	DAY; 11	RCH; 28	CAR; 24	BRI; 11	ATL	NWS	DAR	MAR; 25	TAL; 36	NSV; 8	CLT; 10	DOV; 10	TWS; 9	RSD	MCH; 17	DAY; 11	BRI; 11	ATL; 26	TAL; 5	NSV; 4	DAR; 28	RCH; 16	DOV; 29	NWS; 27	MAR; 28	CLT; 21	CAR; 15				17th	4986.45	
1974	Sisco Racing	05	Chevy	RSD	DAY; 15	RCH; 23	CAR; 31	BRI; 17	ATL; 14	DAR; 13	NWS; 15	MAR; 18	TAL; 39	NSV; 8	DOV; 24	CLT; 9	RSD	MCH; 7	DAY; 9	BRI; 19	NSV; 4	ATL; 12	POC; 11	TAL; 28	MCH; 9	DAR; 3	RCH; 17	DOV; 6	NWS; 10	MAR; 20	CLT; DNQ	CAR; 26	ONT; 11		10th	956.2	
1974	Friez Enterprises	59	Chevy																												CLT; 13				10th	956.2	
1975	Sisco Racing	05	Chevy	RSD	DAY; 21	RCH; 8	CAR; 14	BRI; 7	ATL; 31	NWS; 23	DAR; 28	MAR; 26	TAL; 16	NSV; 8	DOV; 5	CLT; 27	RSD	MCH; 8	DAY; 33	NSV; 7	POC; 19	TAL; 27	MCH; 12	DAR; 3	DOV; 17	NWS; 19	MAR; 20	CLT; 15	RCH; 24	CAR; 26	BRI; 16	ATL; 29	ONT; 12		13th	3116	
1976	Sisco Racing	05	Chevy	RSD	DAY; 29	CAR; 20	RCH; 8	BRI; 23	ATL; 9	NWS; 27	DAR; 13	MAR; 24	TAL; 14	NSV; 9	DOV; 22	CLT; 10	RSD	MCH; 8	DAY; 9	NSV; 16	POC; 10	TAL; 31	MCH; 32	BRI; 14	DAR; 39	RCH; 23	DOV; 11	MAR; 16	NWS; 14	CLT; 19	CAR; 20	ATL; DNQ	ONT; 30		17th	2994	
1976	Viglione Racing	60	Chevy																													ATL; 33			17th	2994	
1977	Sisco Racing	16	Chevy	RSD	DAY; DNQ	RCH	CAR	ATL	NWS; 19	DAR	BRI; 22	MAR	TAL; 30	NSV; 19	DOV; 30	CLT; 32	RSD	MCH; 25	DAY; 34	NSV; 22	POC	TAL; 28	MCH	BRI	DAR	RCH	DOV	MAR	NWS	CLT	CAR	ATL	ONT		37th	847	

===== Daytona 500 =====
Year	Team	Manufacturer	Start	Finish
1972	McGee Racing	Chevrolet	23	7
1973	McGee Racing	Chevrolet	24	11
1974	Sisco Racing	Chevrolet	38	15
1975	Sisco Racing	Chevrolet	12	21
1976	Sisco Racing	Chevrolet	40	29
1977	Sisco Racing	Chevrolet	DNQ	
