= Earl Ross =

Canadian racing driver

- Born: September 4, 1941; Fortune, Prince Edward Island, Canada
- Died: September 18, 2014 (aged 73); Ailsa Craig, Ontario, Canada
- Achievements: Only Canadian driver to win in the NASCAR Winston Cup Series
- Awards: 1974 Winston Cup Series Rookie of the Year

NASCAR Cup Series career
- 26 races run over 4 years
- Best finish: 8th (1974)
- First race: 1973 Daytona 500 (Daytona)
- Last race: 1976 Daytona 500 (Daytona)
- First win: 1974 Old Dominion 500 (Martinsville)
Wins	Top tens	Poles
1	10	0

Earl Ross (September 4, 1941 – September 18, 2014) was a Canadian race car driver who competed in the NASCAR Winston Cup Series from 1973 to 1976 driving the Carling Red Cap No. 52.

== Career summary ==
Ross was born in Fortune, Prince Edward Island, Canada, and was known for being one of only six non-American born drivers to have won a NASCAR Cup Series race (the others being Juan Pablo Montoya, who won the 2007 Toyota/Save Mart 350, Mario Andretti, who won the 1967 Daytona 500, Marcos Ambrose who won the 2011 Heluva Good! Sour Cream Dips at The Glen, Daniel Suárez, who won the 2022 Toyota/Save Mart 350, and Shane van Gisbergen, who won the 2023 Grant Park 220). Ross' only NASCAR win came at Martinsville Speedway on September 29, 1974, during the Old Dominion 500. After qualifying 11th, Ross beat Buddy Baker to the line by more than a lap, thus making him the first and still the only Canadian to have ever won a Winston Cup event. Ron Fellows however has wins in the Nationwide Series and the Camping World Truck Series. Stewart Friesen and Raphaël Lessard have also won in the Truck Series. At that time, Earl was the first rookie to win a Grand National race since Shorty Rollins accomplished the feat in 1958.

The victory helped Ross win the Winston Cup Rookie of the Year in 1974. After competing in only two events in '75 and '76, Ross retired from NASCAR racing. He recorded one win, five top-fives and ten top-tens in 26 races.

Ross competed in a number of regional racing series throughout the 1960s, 1970s, 1980s and 1990s, including time on the ASA circuit and CASCAR Super Series. He also participated in regular Friday night racing at Delaware Speedway before his ultimate retirement in the late 1990s.

Ross was inducted into the Canadian Motorsport Hall of Fame in 2000, FOAR SCORE (Friends Of Auto Racing Seeking Cooperation Of Racing Enthusiasts) Hall of Fame in 2002 and the Maritime Motorsports Hall of Fame in 2011.

Ross, a resident of Ailsa Craig, Ontario, died on September 18, 2014, at the age of 73.

== Motorsports career results ==
=== NASCAR ===
(key) (Bold – Pole position awarded by qualifying time. Italics – Pole position earned by points standings or practice time. * – Most laps led.)

==== Winston Cup Series ====
NASCAR Winston Cup Series results
Year	Team	No.	Make	1	2	3	4	5	6	7	8	9	10	11	12	13	14	15	16	17	18	19	20	21	22	23	24	25	26	27	28	29	30	NWCC	Pts	Ref
1973	Allan Brooke	52	Chevy	RSD	DAY; 39	RCH	CAR	BRI	ATL	NWS	DAR	MAR	TAL; 14	NSV	CLT	DOV	TWS	RSD	MCH; 33	DAY	BRI	ATL	TAL	NSV	DAR	RCH	DOV	NWS	MAR	CLT	CAR			68th	-	
1974	Allan Brooke	52	Chevy	RSD	DAY; 11	RCH	CAR	BRI	ATL; 13	DAR; 12	NWS	MAR	TAL; 50	NSV	DOV	CLT; 5	RSD	MCH; 2																8th	1009.47	
1974	Junior Johnson & Associates	52	Chevy																DAY; 13	BRI; 16	NSV; 8	ATL; 20	POC; 13	TAL; 10	MCH; 6	DAR; 22	RCH; 15	DOV; 3	NWS; 4	MAR; 1	CLT; 20	CAR; 8	ONT; 8	8th	1009.47	
1975	Donlavey Racing	93	Ford	RSD	DAY	RCH	CAR	BRI	ATL	NWS	DAR	MAR	TAL	NSV	DOV	CLT; 13	RSD	MCH	DAY	NSV	POC	TAL	MCH	DAR	DOV	NWS	MAR	CLT	RCH	CAR	BRI	ATL	ONT	NA	0	
1976	DeWitt Racing	52	Chevy	RSD	DAY; 39	CAR	RCH	BRI	ATL	NWS	DAR	MAR	TAL	NSV	DOV	CLT	RSD	MCH	DAY	NSV	POC	TAL	MCH	BRI	DAR	RCH	DOV	MAR	NWS	CLT	CAR	ATL	ONT	115th	46	
1978	H Miller Racing	91	Chevy	RSD	DAY; DNQ	RCH	CAR	ATL	BRI	DAR	NWS	MAR	TAL	DOV	CLT	NSV	RSD	MCH	DAY	NSV	POC	TAL	MCH	BRI	DAR	RCH	DOV	MAR	NWS	CLT	CAR	ATL	ONT	NA	-	

===== Daytona 500 =====
Year	Team	Manufacturer	Start	Finish
1973	Allan Brooke	Chevrolet	30	39
1974	Allan Brooke	Chevrolet	22	11
1976	DeWitt Racing	Chevrolet	12	39
1978	H Miller Racing	Chevrolet	DNQ	

== See also ==
- List of Canadian NASCAR drivers
