= Jackie Rogers =

Racecar driver from North Carolina

- Born: May 6, 1943 (age 83); Wilmington, North Carolina, U.S.
- Awards: 1974 NASCAR Rookie of the Year Runner-Up

NASCAR Cup Series career
- 41 races run over 3 years
- Best finish: 21st (1974)
- First race: 1974 Daytona 500 (Daytona International Speedway)
- Last race: 1976 American 500 (North Carolina Motor Speedway)
Wins	Top tens	Poles
0	10	0

Jackie Rogers (born May 6, 1943 in Wilmington, North Carolina, USA) is a retired NASCAR Winston Cup Series driver who has led only six out of the 4943 laps that he raced in his entire career. Rogers earned $64,582 ($365,398.16 when adjusted for inflation) and drove for 12,297.6 miles (19,791.1 km) finishing an average of 21st place.

Rogers would benefit greatly from participating in the flat tracks; finishing an average of 16th place throughout his career. However, he would suffer from terrible performances on tri-oval intermediate tracks where a 24th-place finish was usually in the cards.

== Motorsports results ==
=== NASCAR ===
(key) (Bold – Pole position awarded by qualifying time. Italics – Pole position earned by points standings or practice time. * – Most laps led.)

==== Winston Cup Series ====
NASCAR Winston Cup Series results
Year	Team	No.	Make	1	2	3	4	5	6	7	8	9	10	11	12	13	14	15	16	17	18	19	20	21	22	23	24	25	26	27	28	29	30	NWCC	Pts	Ref
1974	Ray Frederick	93	Chevy	RSD	DAY; 32	RCH	CAR; 15	BRI	ATL; 16	DAR; 14	NWS	MAR	TAL; 17	NSV	DOV; 8	CLT; 39	RSD	MCH; 11	DAY; 8			ATL; 18	POC; 9	TAL; 21	MCH; 31	DAR; 7		DOV; 33	NWS; 8	MAR; 28	CLT; 28	CAR; 10	ONT; 25	21st	587.88	
1974	Dean Dalton	7	Chevy																	BRI; 30	NSV													21st	587.88	
1974	Ray Frederick	25	Chevy																								RCH; 22							21st	587.88	
1975	Ray Frederick	97	Chevy	RSD	DAY	RCH	CAR	BRI	ATL	NWS	DAR	MAR	TAL	NSV	DOV	CLT; 14	RSD	MCH																44th	502	
1975	Lou Viglione	60	Chevy																DAY; 19	NSV	POC; 30	TAL; 9	MCH; 36	DAR; 38	DOV	NWS	MAR	CLT; 29	RCH	CAR; 36	BRI	ATL	ONT	44th	502	
1976	Lou Viglione	60	Chevy	RSD	DAY; 15	CAR; 12	RCH	BRI	ATL; 10	NWS	DAR	MAR	TAL	NSV	DOV	CLT; 36	RSD	MCH; 9	DAY; 38	NSV	POC; 8	TAL; 15	MCH; 35	BRI	DAR; 15	RCH	DOV	MAR	NWS	CLT	CAR; 19	ATL	ONT	30th	1173	

===== Daytona 500 =====
Year	Team	Manufacturer	Start	Finish
1974	Ray Frederick	Chevrolet	14	32
1976	Lou Viglione	Chevrolet	23	15
