= Gary Myers (racing driver) =

American racing driver (1950–2026)

- Born: March 4, 1950; Walnut Cove, North Carolina, U.S.
- Died: September 10, 2026 (aged 76)
- Achievements: 1996 SMART Modified Tour champion

NASCAR Cup Series career
- 46 races run over 5 years
- Best finish: 27th (1978)
- First race: 1974 Yankee 400 (Michigan)
- Last race: 1978 Los Angeles Times 500 (Ontario)
| Wins | Top tens | Poles |
|---|---|---|
| 0 | 0 | 0 |
- Statistics up to date as of September 11, 2026.

Gary Myers (March 4, 1950 – September 10, 2026) was an American professional stock car racing driver who competed in the NASCAR Winston Cup Series, the NASCAR Grand National East Series, and the NASCAR Featherlite Modified Tour.

Myers was the father of racing drivers Burt Myers and Jason Myers, both of whom compete in modified racing.

Myers also competed in series such as the SMART Modified Tour, where he won the championship in 1996, the USAR Hooters Late Model Series, and the World Series of Asphalt Stock Car Racing.

Myers died on September 10, 2026, at the age of 76.

== Motorsports career results ==
=== NASCAR ===
(key) (Bold - Pole position awarded by qualifying time. Italics - Pole position earned by points standings or practice time. * – Most laps led.)

==== Winston Cup Series ====
NASCAR Winston Cup Series results
| Year | Team | No. | Make | 1 | 2 | 3 | 4 | 5 | 6 | 7 | 8 | 9 | 10 | 11 | 12 | 13 | 14 | 15 | 16 | 17 | 18 | 19 | 20 | 21 | 22 | 23 | 24 | 25 | 26 | 27 | 28 | 29 | 30 | 31 | NWCC | Pts | Ref |
|---|---|---|---|---|---|---|---|---|---|---|---|---|---|---|---|---|---|---|---|---|---|---|---|---|---|---|---|---|---|---|---|---|---|---|---|---|---|
| 1974 | N/A | 87 | Chevy | RSD | DAY | RCH | CAR | BRI | ATL | DAR | NWS | MAR | TAL | NSV | DOV | CLT | RSD | MCH | DAY | BRI | NSV | ATL | POC | TAL; Wth | MCH; 36 | DAR | RCH | DOV; 34 | NWS | MAR | CLT | CAR | ONT | | 125th | 0.695 | |
| 1976 | Jim Fleming | 04 | Chevy | RSD | DAY; DNQ | CAR | RCH | BRI | ATL | NWS | DAR | | | | | | | | | | | | | | | | | | | | | | | | 29th | 1296 | |
| 1976 | Junior Miller | 95 | Chevy | | | | | | | | | MAR; 11 | TAL; 35 | NSV; 27 | DOV; 25 | CLT; 30 | RSD | MCH; 27 | DAY | NSV; 19 | POC; 27 | TAL | MCH | | DAR; 27 | RCH; 21 | DOV; 29 | | | | | | | | 29th | 1296 | |
| 1976 | Gary Myers | 04 | Chevy | | | | | | | | | | | | | | | | | | | | | BRI; 27 | | | | MAR; 26 | NWS; 18 | CLT | | | | | 29th | 1296 | |
| 1976 | Gary Myers | 4 | Chevy | | | | | | | | | | | | | | | | | | | | | | | | | | | | CAR; 34 | ATL | ONT | | 29th | 1296 | |
| 1977 | Gary Myers | 4 | Chevy | RSD | DAY | RCH | CAR; 11 | ATL | NWS; 11 | DAR; 15 | BRI | MAR; 29 | TAL | NSV; 12 | DOV; 22 | CLT | RSD | MCH | DAY | NSV; 26 | POC; 30 | TAL | MCH | BRI | DAR; 15 | RCH | DOV; 34 | MAR | NWS | CLT | CAR | ATL | ONT | | 36th | 888 | |
| 1978 | Gary Myers | 4 | Pontiac | RSD | DAY; Wth | RCH | CAR | ATL | BRI | DAR | | | | | | | | | | | | | | | | | | | | | | | | | 27th | 1915 | |
| 1978 | Gary Myers | 4 | Chevy | | | | | | | | NWS; 20 | MAR; 30 | TAL | DOV; 26 | CLT; 18 | NSV; 28 | RSD | MCH; 23 | DAY | NSV; 15 | POC; 19 | TAL; 21 | MCH; 20 | BRI; 14 | DAR; 14 | RCH; 21 | DOV; 20 | MAR; 15 | NWS; 22 | CLT | CAR; 17 | ATL; 27 | ONT; 24 | | 27th | 1915 | |
| 1979 | Gary Myers | 4 | Chevy | RSD | DAY; Wth | CAR | RCH | ATL | NWS | BRI | DAR | MAR | TAL | NSV | DOV | CLT | TWS | RSD | MCH | DAY | NSV | POC | TAL | MCH | BRI | DAR | RCH | DOV | MAR | CLT | NWS | CAR | ATL | ONT | N/A | 0 | |

===== Daytona 500 =====
| Year | Team | Manufacturer | Start | Finish |
|---|---|---|---|---|
| 1976 | Jim Fleming | Chevrolet | DNQ | |
| 1978 | Gary Myers | Pontiac | Wth | |
| 1979 | Gary Myers | Chevrolet | Wth | |

==== Featherlite Modified Tour ====
NASCAR Featherlite Modified Tour results
| Year | Team | No. | Make | 1 | 2 | 3 | 4 | 5 | 6 | 7 | 8 | 9 | 10 | 11 | 12 | 13 | 14 | 15 | 16 | 17 | 18 | 19 | 20 | 21 | 22 | 23 | 24 | 25 | 26 | 27 | 28 | 29 | NFMTC | Pts | Ref |
|---|---|---|---|---|---|---|---|---|---|---|---|---|---|---|---|---|---|---|---|---|---|---|---|---|---|---|---|---|---|---|---|---|---|---|---|
| 1985 | N/A | 43 | Chevy | TMP | MAR | STA | MAR; 15 | NEG | WFD | NEG | SPE | RIV | CLA | STA | TMP | NEG | HOL | HOL | RIV | CAT | EPP | TMP | WFD | RIV | STA | TMP | POC | TIO | OXF | STA | TMP | MAR | N/A | 0 | |
| 1987 | Robert Garbirino | 4 | Chevy | ROU; 24 | MAR | TMP | STA | CNB | STA | MND | WFD | JEN | SPE | RIV | TMP | RPS | EPP | RIV | STA | TMP | RIV | SEE | STA | POC | TIO | TMP | OXF | TMP | ROU; 16 | MAR | STA | | N/A | 0 | |
| 1988 | Robert Garbirino | 4 | Chevy | ROU | MAR; 8 | TMP | | | | | | | | | | | | | | | | | | | | ROU; 19 | MAR; 17 | | | | | | 38th | 502 | |
| 1988 | N/A | 14 | Chevy | | | | MAR; 8 | JEN | IRP | MND | OSW | OSW | RIV | JEN | RPS | TMP | RIV | OSW | TMP | OXF | OSW | TMP | POC | TIO | TMP | | | | | | | | 38th | 502 | |
| 1989 | N/A | 4 | Chevy | MAR; 26 | TMP | MAR | JEN | STA | IRP | OSW | WFD | MND | RIV | OSW | JEN | STA | RPS | RIV | OSW | TMP | TMP | RPS | OSW | TMP | POC | STA | TIO | | | | | | N/A | 0 | |
| 1989 | N/A | 14 | Chevy | | | | | | | | | | | | | | | | | | | | | | | | | MAR; 23 | TMP | | | | N/A | 0 | |
| 1990 | N/A | 14 | Chevy | MAR; 11 | TMP | RCH | STA | | | | | | | | | | | | | | | | | | | MAR; 27 | | | | | | | 41st | 342 | |
| 1990 | N/A | 4 | Chevy | | | | | MAR; 11 | STA | TMP | MND | HOL | STA | RIV | JEN | EPP | RPS | RIV | TMP | RPS | NHA | TMP | POC | STA | TMP | | | | | | | | 41st | 342 | |
| 1991 | Myers Brothers Racing | 47 | Chevy | MAR; 29 | | | | | | | | | | | | | | | | | | | | | | | | | | | | | 48th | 345 | |
| 1991 | Myers Brothers Racing | 6 | Chevy | | RCH; 9 | TMP | NHA | MAR; 30 | NZH | STA | TMP | FLE | OXF | RIV | JEN | STA | RPS | RIV | RCH | TMP | NHA | TMP | POC | STA | TMP | MAR | | | | | | | 48th | 345 | |
| 1997 | Doug James | 14 | Chevy | TMP | MAR; 13 | STA | NZH | STA | NHA | FLE | JEN | RIV | GLN | NHA | RPS | HOL | TMP | RIV | NHA | GLN | STA | NHA | STA | FLE | TMP | RCH | | | | | | | N/A | 0 | |
