= Bobby Ore =

American stunt driver (born 1949)

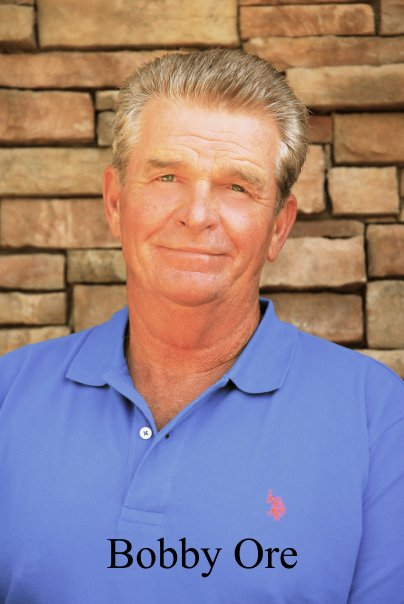
- Born: January 1949 (age 77); Oklahoma City, Oklahoma

NASCAR Cup Series career
- 1 race run over 1 year
- Best finish: 137th (1974)
- First race: 1974 Nashville 420 (Nashville)
| Wins | Top tens | Poles |
|---|---|---|
| 0 | 0 | 0 |

Bobby Ore (born January 1949) is an American stunt driver. Ore got his start in working with automobiles at a young age, fixing and repairing old vehicles to sell at a profit – then learning to drive and handle them in many different ways. Ore moved on to become a stunt driver working on movies, television shows, and professional engagements including movies such as Gone in 60 Seconds, Project Swordfish, Dukes of Hazzard, and many more. Ore has also had bit roles in acting in movies such as Charlie's Angels as well as performing stunts. Bobby has raced in NASCAR, SCCA, Funny car dragsters and more. He has also gone on to start a driving school for stunt driving and military/tactical driving beginning in 1995 to train aspiring stuntmen and stuntwomen, people looking to have fun, and corporate events.

== World record ==
Ore holds a Guinness Book of World Records record for longest distance in a London double decker bus on 2 wheels for 810 feet.

== Business ==
Ore originally started teaching in 1995 at the urging of the Screen Actors Guild looking for more training of stunt drivers. His school, Bobby Ore Motorsports currently has three locations, Dawsonville, Georgia; Sebring, Florida; and Camarillo, California. Classes include the teaching of forward 180s, reverse 180s, sliding 90s, drifting and other precision vehicle handling techniques. Military and tactical training is also provided to those in the industry and showing proof of credentials.

Ore is also known for his maneuver called the "Circle of Trust" where he drifts a vehicle around a person coming within inches of the person's feet.

== Personal life ==
Ore is married to Roslyn Ore and has six children.

== Motorsports career results ==
=== NASCAR ===
(key) (Bold – Pole position awarded by qualifying time. Italics – Pole position earned by points standings or practice time. * – Most laps led.)

==== Winston Cup Series ====
NASCAR Winston Cup Series results
| Year | Team | No. | Make | 1 | 2 | 3 | 4 | 5 | 6 | 7 | 8 | 9 | 10 | 11 | 12 | 13 | 14 | 15 | 16 | 17 | 18 | 19 | 20 | 21 | 22 | 23 | 24 | 25 | 26 | 27 | 28 | 29 | 30 | NWCC | Pts |
|---|---|---|---|---|---|---|---|---|---|---|---|---|---|---|---|---|---|---|---|---|---|---|---|---|---|---|---|---|---|---|---|---|---|---|---|
| 1974 | Ore Racing | 86 | Chevy | RSD | DAY | RCH | CAR | BRI | ATL | DAR | NWS | MAR | TAL | NSV | DOV | CLT | RSD | MCH | DAY | BRI | NSV; 17 | ATL | POC | TAL | MCH | DAR | RCH | DOV | NWS | MAR | CLT | CAR | ONT | 137th | 0.44 |
