= 1974 NASCAR Winston Cup Series =

American motorsport season

Seasons
- ← 1973 1975 →

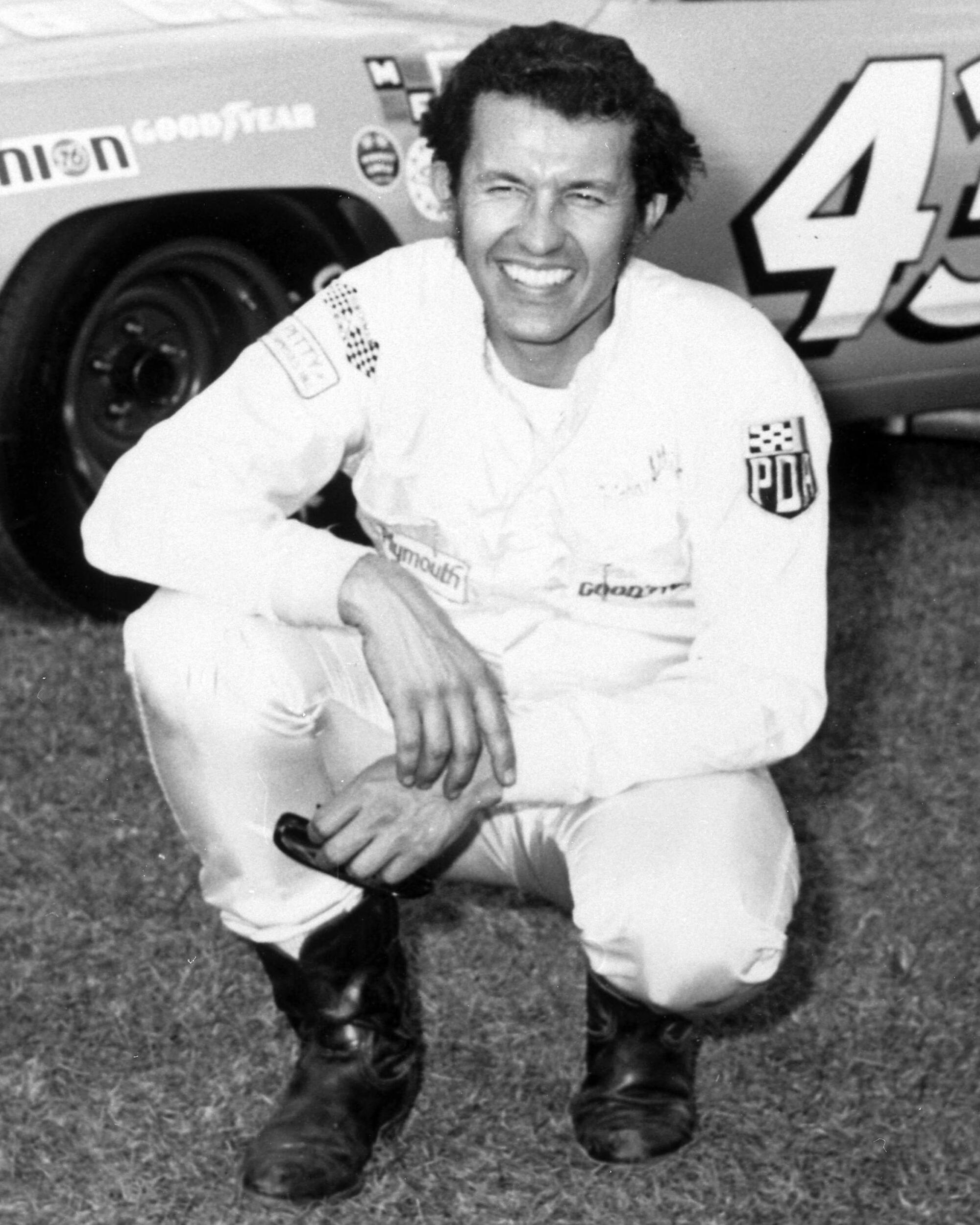
Richard Petty, the 1974 NASCAR Winston Cup Series Champion. This would be his 5th of his 7 championships.

The 1974 NASCAR Winston Cup Series was the 26th season of professional stock car racing in the United States and the 3rd modern-era NASCAR Cup series. The season began on Sunday January 20 and ended on Sunday November 24. The first 15 races were shortened 10 percent due to the 1973 oil crisis. Following criticism of the 1972 and 1973 points systems that placed emphasis on completed miles, NASCAR implemented a new points system, that took basic purse winnings, multiplied by number of starts, and divided by 1,000; it was designed to more directly reward winning races, a response to Benny Parsons' championship the previous year with just one win. Richard Petty was Winston Cup champion at the end of the season finishing 567.45 points ahead of Cale Yarborough, while David Pearson finished a strong third in points despite only nineteen starts. Earl Ross was named NASCAR Rookie of the Year.

This was the last season without Dale Earnhardt, Ricky Rudd, and Bill Elliott until 2002, 2006, and 2013, respectively. It was also the first year that all cars had to run the 358 cubic inches (5,870 cc) engine.

== Races ==
=== Winston Western 500 ===
Begun on January 20, the Western 500 at Riverside International Raceway was stopped by rain and resumed on January 26. Cale Yarborough led 144 laps but was closely contested by Bobby Allison, who led 33 laps. Allison faltered and finished a distant fifth, while Cale took the win with Richard Petty second. David Pearson finished third in the final eligible race for the Wood Brothers 1971 Mercury Cyclone; the car had won 19 times with Pearson and A. J. Foyt the previous two seasons.

Top ten results

1. 11 - Cale Yarborough
2. 43 - Richard Petty
3. 21 - David Pearson
4. 72 - Benny Parsons
5. 12 - Bobby Allison
6. 88 - Donnie Allison
7. 16 - Gary Bettenhausen
8. 24 - Cecil Gordon
9. 98 - Richie Panch
10. 04 - Hershel McGriff

=== Daytona 500 ===
Top ten results

1. 43 - Richard Petty
2. 11 - Cale Yarborough
3. 83 - Ramo Stott
4. 14 - Coo Coo Marlin
5. 50 - A. J. Foyt
6. 88 - Donnie Allison
7. 95 - Darrell Waltrip
8. 27 - Bobby Isaac
9. 32 - Dick Brooks
10. 30 - Walter Ballard

=== Richmond 500 ===
Bobby Allison grabbed the win, his third with his own team since the start of 1973.

Top ten results

1. 12 - Bobby Allison
2. 43 - Richard Petty
3. 11 - Cale Yarborough
4. 54 - Lennie Pond
5. 2 - Dave Marcis
6. 48 - James Hylton
7. 70 - J.D. McDuffie
8. 90 - Bill Dennis
9. 64 - Elmo Langley
10. 67 - Buddy Arrington

=== Carolina 500 ===
Cale Yarborough led most of the first half but his car's handling deteriorated throughout the race and Richard Petty dominated the second half en route to the win.

Top ten results

1. 43 - Richard Petty
2. 11 - Cale Yarborough
3. 12 - Bobby Allison
4. 28 - Charlie Glotzbach
5. 15 - George Follmer
6. 30 - Walter Ballard
7. 90 - Bill Dennis
8. 2 - Dave Marcis
9. 54 - Lennie Pond
10. 48 - James Hylton

=== Southeastern 500 ===
Amid periodic snow flurries, a crowd of 18,000 witnessed Cale Yarborough win for the second straight spring Bristol race. Richard Petty was hit in the driver side door in a four-car crash.

Top ten results

1. 11 - Cale Yarborough
2. 27 - Bobby Isaac
3. 72 - Benny Parsons
4. 12 - Bobby Allison
5. 88 - Donnie Allison
6. 24 - Cecil Gordon
7. 60 - Joe Mihalic
8. 48 - James Hylton
9. 68 - Alton Jones
10. 14 - Coo Coo Marlin

=== Atlanta 500 ===
NASCAR mandated smaller carburetors for big-block engines. David Pearson led the most laps in a small block but had to pit late for fuel, giving Cale Yarborough the win.

Top ten results

1. 11 - Cale Yarborough
2. 21 - David Pearson
3. 71 - Buddy Baker
4. 15 - George Follmer
5. 88 - Donnie Allison
6. 43 - Richard Petty
7. 95 - Darrell Waltrip
8. 57 - Bob Burcham
9. 16 - Gary Bettenhausen
10. 54 - Lennie Pond

=== Rebel 450 ===
Darlington's spring race shaved 10 percent off its race distance as other races did, but did not lop off the opening 36 laps, it simply scheduled the race as a 450-miler. David Pearson took his third straight Rebel race win (and fifth in all). The race was stopped for half an hour when Lennie Pond smashed a guardrail and several posts were pushed off. Cale Yarborough took the point lead.

Top ten results

1. 21 - David Pearson
2. 12 - Bobby Allison
3. 71 - Buddy Baker
4. 88 - Donnie Allison
5. 11 - Cale Yarborough
6. 16 - Dave Marcis
7. 28 - Sam McQuagg
8. 18 - Joe Frasson
9. 95 - Darrell Waltrip
10. 57 - Bob Burcham

=== Gwyn Staley Memorial ===
Richard Petty debuted a hand-built (by his brother, the team's chief engine builder Maurice) small-block Chrysler engine and won going away. The win put him back into the point lead. Petty stated the small block cost $50,000; “so we're still in the red right now.”

Top ten results

1. 43 - Richard Petty
2. 11 - Cale Yarborough
3. 12 - Bobby Allison
4. 72 - Benny Parsons
5. 54 - Lennie Pond
6. 15 - George Follmer
7. 88 - Donnie Allison
8. 70 - J.D. McDuffie
9. 90 - Harry Gant
10. 2 - Dave Marcis

=== Virginia 500 ===
Cale Yarborough lead almost wire to wire and the win gave him back the point lead. Richard Petty finished second despite multiple pitstops.

Top ten results

1. 11 - Cale Yarborough
2. 43 - Richard Petty
3. 12 - Bobby Allison
4. 72 - Benny Parsons
5. 54 - Lennie Pond
6. 90 - Jimmy Hensley
7. 48 - James Hylton
8. 2 - Dave Marcis
9. 70 - J.D. McDuffie
10. 96 - Richard Childress

=== Winston 500 ===
The lead changed 52 times among 14 drivers as David Pearson edged Benny Parsons. During pitstops at Lap 105 crewman Don Miller lost a leg when he was hit by the spinning car of rookie Grant Adcox.

Top ten results

1. 21 - David Pearson
2. 72 - Benny Parsons
3. 43 - Richard Petty
4. 90 - Charlie Glotzbach
5. 54 - Lennie Pond
6. 2 - Dave Marcis
7. 14 - Coo Coo Marlin
8. 28 - Sam McQuagg
9. 11 - Cale Yarborough
10. 57 - Bob Burcham

=== Music City 420 ===
Rain pushed the second half of the race from Saturday night to Sunday afternoon. Richard Petty took his fourth win of the season and retook the point lead over Yarborough. It was Neil Bonnett's first Winston Cup start.

Top ten results

1. 43 - Richard Petty
2. 88 - Donnie Allison
3. 95 - Darrell Waltrip
4. 57 - Bob Burcham
5. 2 - Dave Marcis
6. 15 - George Follmer
7. 70 - J.D. McDuffie
8. 05 - David Sisco
9. 14 - Coo Coo Marlin
10. 67 - Buddy Arrington

=== Mason-Dixon 500 ===
Petty, Pearson, and Yarborough were the only leaders in a race interrupted only three times for yellows. Petty, running the small-block Chrysler engine, led 210 laps but fell out with engine failure while leading with three laps to go. Cale took the win having led 220 laps, while Pearson was second with only 20 laps led.

Top ten results

1. 11 - Cale Yarborough
2. 21 - David Pearson
3. 43 - Richard Petty
4. 72 - Benny Parsons
5. 15 - George Follmer
6. 54 - Lennie Pond
7. 2 - Dave Marcis
8. 93 - Jackie Rogers
9. 83 - Ramo Stott
10. 48 - James Hylton

=== World 600 ===
David Pearson edged Richard Petty as the lead changed 37 times, the most for the race to that point of its history. Buddy Baker left Harry Hyde's Dodge team to drive Bud Moore's Ford after Moore released driver George Follmer. Baker led 94 laps before falling out with engine failure; he was signed to drive the rest of the season in Moore's Ford.

Top ten results

1. 21 - David Pearson
2. 43 - Richard Petty
3. 12 - Bobby Allison
4. 95 - Darrell Waltrip
5. 52 - Earl Ross
6. 2 - Dave Marcis
7. 81 - Dick Trickle
8. 31 - Jim Vandiver
9. 05 - David Sisco
10. 70 - J.D. McDuffie

=== Tuborg 400 ===
George Follmer was fired from Bud Moore's team before the 600 and jumped into Roger Penske's AMC Matador; he won the pole but blew his engine after just seven laps. Cale Yarborough edged Bobby Allison for the win, his sixth of the season.

Top ten results

1. 11 - Cale Yarborough
2. 12 - Bobby Allison
3. 72 - Benny Parsons
4. 24 - Cecil Gordon
5. 79 - Frank Warren
6. 48 - James Hylton
7. 68 - Sonny Easley
8. 37 - Chuck Wahl
9. 56 - Eddie Bradshaw
10. 89 - Don Reynolds

=== Motor State 400 ===
This was the last race of the season shortened by NASCAR due to the energy crunch. The lead changed 50 times among eight drivers, a new record for the track to that point. Petty edged rookie Earl Ross after Pearson pitted under a late yellow for tires and the green never flew again.

Top ten results

1. 43 - Richard Petty
2. 52 - Earl Ross
3. 21 - David Pearson
4. 16 - Gary Bettenhausen
5. 42 - Marty Robbins
6. 96 - Richard Childress
7. 05 - David Sisco
8. 2 - Dave Marcis
9. 98 - Richie Panch
10. 24 - Cecil Gordon

=== Firecracker 400 ===
David Pearson, the winner of the previous two 400s, pulled an audacious fake as he slammed his brakes to put Petty into the lead on the final lap, then drafted past at the stripe; Pearson's maneuver was such that an angered Petty confronted Pearson in the pressbox after the race; the ensuing dialogue was transcribed by The Charlotte Observer and published the next day (July 5, 1974, edition). Bobby Allison took over Roger Penske's Matador; he led 50 laps but broke an intake valve late in the race and finished fifth. The lead changed 45 times, a race record that stood until 2010.

Top ten results

1. 21 - David Pearson
2. 43 - Richard Petty
3 *DH. 15 - Buddy Baker
3 *DH. 11 - Cale Yarborough
5. 16 - Bobby Allison
6. 28 - Bobby Isaac
7. 54 - Lennie Pond
8. 93 - Jackie Rogers
9. 05 - David Sisco
10. 24 - Cecil Gordon

- Cale Yarborough and Buddy Baker crossed the line nose to nose in a dead heat for third. Because electronic timing and scoring didn't exist at the time, no one could determine who finished ahead. As a result, both Yarborough and Baker were credited with third place, and were awarded the same amount of points and prize money.

=== Volunteer 500 ===
Junior Johnson had purchased his race team from Richard Howard when Carling Breweries joined the #52 of Earl Ross along with Cale Yarborough's #11. In the second race as owner of the team Junior saw Cale dominate but Buddy Baker surged to the lead late. A caution set up a two lap sprint and Cale sideslammed Baker on the final lap for the win. The race saw Neil Bonnett strike the inside pit guardrail, tearing up numerous support posts and requiring a 40-lap caution for repairs.

Top ten results

1. 11 - Cale Yarborough
2. 15 - Buddy Baker
3. 43 - Richard Petty
4. 90 - Charlie Glotzbach
5. 12 - Bobby Allison
6. 24 - Cecil Gordon
7. 32 - Dick Brooks
8. 67 - Buddy Arrington
9. 2 - Dave Marcis
10. 30 - Walter Ballard

=== Nashville 420 ===
Controversy marred Nashville's mid-summer event. Following Richard Petty's crash a scoring controversy ensued involving Cale Yarborough and Charlie Glotzbach; Glotzbach was placed a lap down based on scoring, but Cale stayed on the lead lap. Allison finished just behind Yarborough and drove into victory lane ahead of Yarborough, insisting Cale was a lap down. NASCAR later said a scoring mistake had been made but that the Yarborough win would stand.

Top ten results

1. 11 - Cale Yarborough
2. 12 - Bobby Allison
3. 95 - Darrell Waltrip
4. 05 - David Sisco
5. 68 - Alton Jones
6. 90 - Charlie Glotzbach
7. 72 - Benny Parsons
8. 52 - Earl Ross
9. 67 - Buddy Arrington
10. 98 - Richie Panch

=== Dixie 500 ===
Richard Petty, Cale Yarborough, Buddy Baker, and David Pearson dueled over the first 170 laps. Petty then lost a lap on a cut tire but made it up after Tony Bettenhausen suffered engine failure. At Lap 300 final stops occurred and the Petty Enterprises team put on tires they'd kept after the Atlanta 500 in March, a softer compound for March's much cooler temperatures; the gamble worked as Petty stormed to a 21-second win. It was the eleventh race they'd run a small block Chrysler engine and their fourth win with it.

=== Purolator 500 ===
Originally published in NASCAR's schedule, the annual 300-miler at Trenton Speedway was cancelled and replaced by Pocono's Purolator 500. Richard Petty won the race as rain shortened the race by eight laps. Buddy Baker won the pole; he'd also won the pole in late April in Pocono's USAC stock car 500-miler. It was the inaugural race for NASCAR at Pocono, which has become part of the annual schedule since then.

Top ten results

1. 43 - Richard Petty
2. 15 - Buddy Baker
3. 11 - Cale Yarborough
4. 21 - David Pearson
5. 72 - Benny Parsons
6. 2 - Dave Marcis
7. 24 - Cecil Gordon
8. 77 - Jan Opperman
9. 93 - Jackie Rogers
10. 30 - Kenny Brightbill

=== Talladega 500 ===
25 of the event's 50 entries were found sabotaged in the garage area on race morning. NASCAR instituted several competition cautions to allow teams to find previously undetected sabotage. Buddy Baker fell out after leading 98 laps with rearend failure with three laps to go. Petty sideswiped past Pearson at the stripe ("Pearson tried to cut me off," Petty said; "I'd rather rub fenders with Richard than compete clean with some of the other cats, who are crazy at times," Pearson added); it was Petty's third straight win. Three days before the race A. J. Foyt brought his Coyote Indycar for a speed test; he hit 217 MPH, a closed-course record for the time.

Top ten results

1. 43 - Richard Petty
2. 21 - David Pearson
3. 12 - Bobby Allison
4. 11 - Cale Yarborough
5. 72 - Benny Parsons
6. 15 - Buddy Baker
7. 83 - Ramo Stott
8. 28 - Bobby Isaac
9. 42 - Marty Robbins
10. 52 - Earl Ross

=== Yankee 400 ===
Pearson won for the first time since Daytona in July, beating Petty by some five seconds. The lead changed 45 times as Cale Yarborough led 60 laps but lost contact with the leaders after a late tire change backfired with mismatched tires.

Top ten results

1. 21 - David Pearson
2. 43 - Richard Petty
3. 11 - Cale Yarborough
4. 15 - Buddy Baker
5. 12 - Bobby Allison
6. 52 - Earl Ross
7. 2 - Dave Marcis
8. 32 - Dick Brooks
9. 05 - David Sisco
10. 98 - Richie Panch

=== Southern 500 ===
Cale Yarborough took his third win in the race after melees eliminated half the field; Richard Petty, Bobby Allison and Buddy Baker were notable crash victims, and rookie Richie Panch was singled out for criticism after being involved in three wrecks. Sophomore Darrell Waltrip took second. NASCAR's 1974 point system, which took purse winnings multiplied by number of starts divided by 1,000, came under fire when Petty wrecked early yet outpointed every car that finished ahead of him except race-winner Yarborough.

Top ten results

1. 11 - Cale Yarborough
2. 95 - Darrell Waltrip
3. 05 - David Sisco
4. 2 - Dave Marcis
5. 48 - James Hylton
6. 49 - G.C. Spencer
7. 93 - Jackie Rogers
8. 07 - Jerry Schild
9. 18 - Joe Frasson
10. 67 - Pee Wee Wentz

=== Capital City 500 ===
Cale Yarborough led 98 of the first 120 laps but the pavement was grinding up and Cale slipped in loose asphalt and crashed. The wreck put Richard Petty into the lead for the remaining 380 laps. Bobby Allison, originally entered in the race, did not race.

Top ten results

1. 43 - Richard Petty
2. 72 - Benny Parsons
3. 98 - Richie Panch
4. 90 - Charlie Glotzbach
5. 30 - Walter Ballard
6. 64 - Elmo Langley
7. 9 - Tony Bettenhausen Jr.
8. 70 - J. D. McDuffie
9. 24 - Cecil Gordon
10. 54 - Lennie Pond

=== Delaware 500 ===
Petty led 491 laps and put the entire field three laps down while Yarborough fell out with engine failure.

Top ten results

1. 43 - Richard Petty
2. 15 - Buddy Baker
3. 52 - Earl Ross
4. 72 - Benny Parsons
5. 2 - Dave Marcis
6. 05 - David Sisco
7. 24 - Cecil Gordon
8. 83 - Kenny Brightbill
9. 19 - Henley Gray
10. 30 - Walter Ballard

=== Wilkes 400 ===
Petty and Yarborough swept the front row and led 391 laps. Cale led for 275 laps. Petty lost a lap on late pitstops but unlapped himself; he had to settle for second when a late yellow ended the race under caution.

Top ten results

1. 11 - Cale Yarborough
2. 43 - Richard Petty
3. 15 - Buddy Baker
4. 52 - Earl Ross
5. 2 - Dave Marcis
6. 28 - Bobby Isaac
7. 96 - Richard Childress
8. 93 - Jackie Rogers
9. 30 - Walter Ballard
10. 05 - David Sisco

=== Old Dominion 500 ===
Earl Ross pulled off the upset win, the first for a rookie since 1965 and first for a Canadian driver ever. The win came after teammate Cale Yarborough crashed.

Top ten results

1. 52 - Earl Ross
2. 15 - Buddy Baker
3. 88 - Donnie Allison
4. 2 - Dave Marcis
5. 98 - Richie Panch
6. 48 - James Hylton
7. 64 - Elmo Langley
8. 79 - Frank Warren
9. 67 - Satch Worley
10. 25 - Jabe Thomas

=== National 500 ===
David Pearson made up a lap lost in the first 100 laps of the race and edged Richard Petty, who erased a two-lap deficit despite a pit fire three-quarters into the race; it was the fifth time in the season Pearson and Petty finished together in the top two and Pearson's fourth win in that rivalry. The race was chaotic as a ten-car melee erupted on the third lap and a vicious two-car crash in Turn Four eliminated Grant Adcox and Ramo Stott. The lead changed 47 times, a race record that was tied in 2000, and a track record that lasted until the 1979 World 600, among 11 drivers; it was the sixth race of the season to break 40 official lead changes.

Top ten results

1. 21 - David Pearson
2. 43 - Richard Petty
3. 95 - Darrell Waltrip
4. 88 - Donnie Allison
5. 12 - Bobby Allison
6. 54 - Lennie Pond
7. 97 - Harry Jefferson
8. 2 - Dick Trickle
9. 19 - Bob Burcham
10. 35 - Dan Daughtry

=== American 500 ===
Pearson grabbed his seventh win of 1974, edging Cale by two seconds. The surface at North Carolina Motor Speedway proved hard on tires and pitstops became frequent. Buddy Baker led twelve laps but fell out after only eighteen laps with brake failure.

Top ten results

1. 21 - David Pearson
2. 11 - Cale Yarborough
3. 43 - Richard Petty
4. 12 - Bobby Allison
5. 95 - Darrell Waltrip
6. 88 - Donnie Allison
7. 2 - Dick Trickle
8. 52 - Earl Ross
9. 72 - Benny Parsons
10. 93 - Jackie Rogers

=== Los Angeles Times 500 ===
Originally left off of NASCAR's schedule, the race was added late in the season. Richard Petty led the most laps but fell out late and finished 15th. Bobby Allison took the win in Roger Penske's AMC Matador but was fined $9,100 for unapproved valve lifters in postrace inspection. The race lead changed 38 times officially (a track record for stock cars) while several laps saw up to four lead changes in one circuit.

Top ten results

1. 12 - Bobby Allison
2. 21 - David Pearson
3. 11 - Cale Yarborough
4. 28 - A. J. Foyt
5. 15 - Buddy Baker
6. 95 - Darrell Waltrip
7. 83 - Ramo Stott
8. 52 - Earl Ross
9. 98 - Richie Panch
10. 70 - J. D. McDuffie

== Season recap ==
No.	Date	Event	Circuit	Winner
1	January 20 & 26	Winston Western 500	Riverside International Raceway	Cale Yarborough
	February 14	125 Mile Qualifying Races	Daytona International Speedway	Bobby Isaac
	February 14	125 Mile Qualifying Races	Daytona International Speedway	Cale Yarborough
2	February 17	Daytona 500	Daytona International Speedway	Richard Petty
3	February 24	Richmond 500	Richmond Fairgrounds Raceway	Bobby Allison
4	March 4	Carolina 500	North Carolina Speedway	Richard Petty
5	March 17	Southeastern 500	Bristol International Speedway	Cale Yarborough
6	March 24	Atlanta 500	Atlanta International Raceway	Cale Yarborough
7	April 7	Rebel 500	Darlington Raceway	David Pearson
8	April 21	Gwyn Staley 400	North Wilkesboro Speedway	Richard Petty
9	April 28	Virginia 500	Martinsville Speedway	Cale Yarborough
10	May 5	Winston 500	Alabama International Motor Speedway	David Pearson
11	May 11 & 12	Music City USA 420	Nashville Speedway	Richard Petty
12	May 19	Mason-Dixon 500	Dover Downs International Speedway	Cale Yarborough
13	May 26	World 600	Charlotte Motor Speedway	David Pearson
14	June 9	Tuborg 400	Riverside International Raceway	Cale Yarborough
15	June 16	Motor State 400	Michigan International Speedway	Richard Petty
16	July 4	Firecracker 400	Daytona International Speedway	David Pearson
17	July 14	Volunteer 500	Bristol International Speedway	Cale Yarborough
18	July 20	Nashville 420	Nashville Speedway	Cale Yarborough
19	July 28	Dixie 500	Atlanta International Raceway	Richard Petty
20	August 4	Purolator 500	Pocono Raceway	Richard Petty
21	August 11	Talladega 500	Alabama International Motor Speedway	Richard Petty
22	August 25	Yankee 400	Michigan International Speedway	David Pearson
23	September 2	Southern 500	Darlington Raceway	Cale Yarborough
24	September 8	Capital City 500	Richmond Fairgrounds Raceway	Richard Petty
25	September 15	Delaware 500	Dover Downs International Speedway	Richard Petty
26	September 22	Wilkes 400	North Wilkesboro Speedway	Cale Yarborough
27	September 29	Old Dominion 500	Martinsville Speedway	Earl Ross
28	October 6	National 500	Charlotte Motor Speedway	David Pearson
29	October 20	American 500	North Carolina Speedway	David Pearson
30	November 24	Los Angeles Times 500	Ontario Motor Speedway	Bobby Allison

== Final Points standings ==
(key) Bold – Pole position awarded by time. Italics – Pole position set by owner's points. * – Most laps led. ** - All laps led.

Pos.	Driver	RIV	DAY	RCH	CAR	BRI	ATL	DAR	NWS	MAR	TAL	NSV	DOV	CLT	RIV	MCH	DAY	BRI	NSV	ATL	POC	TAL	MCH	DAR	RCH	DOV	NWS	MAR	CLT	CAR	ONT	Pts
1	Richard Petty	2	1*	2	1*	23	6	20	1*	2	3	1	3	2	25	1*	2	**3**	13*	1	1*	1	2	**35**	**1***	1*	**2**	**29**	2	**3**	**15***	5037.75
2	Cale Yarborough	1*	2	3	**2**	1*	1	5	2	**1***	9	14*	1*	11	1*	27	4	1*	1	**14**	3	4	3	1*	21	28	1*	11*	23	2*	3	4470.3
3	David Pearson	**3**	**35**		34		**2***	1*			**1***		**2**	**1***		**3**	**1**			2*	4	**2**	**1***	25		30			**1***	1	2	2389.25
4	Bobby Allison	5	30	**1***	3	4	26	2	**3**	3	31	**20**	28	3	2	23	5*	5	2	28	21	3	5	30		13			5	4	1	2019.195
5	Benny Parsons	4	22	13	23	3	29	32	4	4	2	16	4	31	3	25	27	17	7	8	5	5	22	26	2	4	13	15	27	9	35	1591.5
6	Dave Marcis	28	14	5	8	22	20	6	10	8	6	5	7	6	27	8	19	9	21	6	6	11	7	4	13	5	5	4	31	29	17	1378.2
7	Buddy Baker						3	3			33			22		30	3	2	25	3	**2**	6*	4	33		**2**	3	2	37	34	5	1016.88
8	Earl Ross **(R)**		11				13	12			50			5		2	13	16	8	20	13	10	6	22	15	3	4	1	20	8	8	1009.47
9	Cecil Gordon	8	13	11	29	6	34	11	11	15	21	25	27	28	4	10	10	6	20	10	7	15	12	19	9	7	27	26	15	21	29	1000.65
10	David Sisco		15	23	31	17	14	13	15	18	39	8	24	9		7	9	19	4	12	11	28	9	3	17	6	10	20	13	26	11	956.2
11	James Hylton	DNQ	16	6	10	8	12	26	28	7	14	24	10	15	6	32	32	20	22	23	34	12	35	5	23	19	24	6	11	18	14	924.955
12	J. D. McDuffie	22	28	7	13	12	15	30	8	9	19	7	11	10	17	17	11	11	27	19	25	24	13	17	8	12	23	16	21	19	10	920.85
13	Frank Warren		34	20	20	13	17	17	19	16	18	18	15	15	5	14	16	21	30	17	19	17	20	12	19	16	18	8	25	23	21	820.845
14	Richie Panch **(R)**	9	18	21	14	27	36	37	18	13	44	28		23		9	34	15	10	27	26	43	10	24	3	20	17	5	14	27	9	775.44
15	Walter Ballard		10	19	6	14		40	12	11	24	21	22	12		35	20	10	26	13	29	48	24	16	5	10	9	25	12	15	16	748.44
16	Richard Childress		40	16	36	20	27	39	22	10	11	26	21	34	15	6	23	24	23	11	12	13	27	18	24	18	7	24	41	24	12	735.44
17	Donnie Allison	6	6	17	27	**5**	5	**4**	7	23	36	2	30	30		20	33			30		40				31		3	4	6		728.805
18	Lennie Pond		23	4	9	26	10	21	5	5	5	11	6	20		26	7			5	30			13	10	32		12	6	11		723.25
19	Darrell Waltrip		7		25		7	9			DNQ	3	20	4			24		**3**	4		44		2		35			3	5	6	609.975
20	Tony Bettenhausen Jr.	17	33	12	19	29		18	14	29	30	23	34	21	31	36	14	26	11	24	27	32	25	11	7	15	25	14		20		601.695
21	Jackie Rogers **(R)**		32		15		16	14			17		8	39		11	8	30		18	9	21	31	7	22	33	8	28	28	10	25	587.88
22	Coo Coo Marlin		4		24	10	28	19		12	7	9		38		13	18	12	28	9		35	11	29	18	25	11	22	22	12		581.67
23	Ed Negre		DNQ	24	22	11	22	24	17	26	34		14		23	31	26	13	29	25	20	14	21	21	20	11	30	17	17	28	23	534.3
24	Bob Burcham		17		11		8	10			10	4		36		16	38	14		22	15	27	14	27	14	29	19		9	14		445.5
25	Elmo Langley	15	DNQ	9	38	16		38	13	27	23	12	18					27	18	16	18	20	16	20	6	22	26	7	33	25		433.78
26	Charlie Glotzbach		36		4		11				4			37			22	4	6	26		34		14	4		15	QL	30			293.09
27	Dick Brooks		9		12		24	29	24		29			27		19	15	7				29	8	34	16				36	31		267.52
28	Joe Frasson		26		37		19	8			25			40		18	17			7		42	23	9				DNQ	38	36		240.8
29	George Follmer	18	20		5	28	4	22	6	22	28	6	5		**33**																32	230.49
30	Buddy Arrington		DNQ	10	16	21		16	27	17	46	10	12	19		12	21	8	9	15	16	Wth										221.2
31	Bill Champion		DNQ	27		18		28	25	24	DNQ		19			33	40	22		33	22	36	30	31	11	38	28		QL	22		207.72
32	D. K. Ulrich		DNQ	22					21		26	17	17			15		23	12		17	30	28			26	14	13			24	155.325
33	Bobby Isaac		8			2		33		25				33			6			34		8		37			6		32			152.95
34	Travis Tiller			18		19	35	DNQ		20	35		23	26		29					24	38	17		12	36	16	DNQ				146.44
35	Roy Mayne		DNQ		30		21	15			13			13			25		24	32	31	19		39					DNQ			141.72
36	Dean Dalton		DNQ	28	33	24			29	14	49	15	13			21	12	28	15	29	32	Wth										125.44
37	Neil Castles			15	35			34	16	28				16		34	Wth			35	33	46		36			21	DNQ	40	33		123.565
38	G. C. Spencer		DNQ		39		30	36					31	25			30			21				6		37			Wth	35		96.8
39	Ramo Stott **(R)**		3								DNQ		9									7		28					19		7	82.95
40	Jim Vandiver		27								16			8			35					33		15					39			71.4
41	Dan Daughtry		38				32				48			29			31			36		41							10			63.04
42	Jabe Thomas			26		30			20	19			25			28	Wth	29					32				20	10				49.14
43	Gary Bettenhausen	7	12				9				37					4																49
44	A. J. Foyt		5														29												26		4	41.22
45	Jerry Schild										40											16		8					34	13		35.375
46	Earle Canavan		DNQ										16								14		15	23		17					30	34.92
47	Dick Trickle													7															8	7		24.495
48	Marty Robbins										15					5						9							42			23.78
49	Alton Jones		DNQ			9					47	27							5			26										20.4
50	Hershel McGriff	10	39		32						12				35																	20.34
51	Carl Adams	13					18	DNQ			22																				40	19.2
52	Harry Jefferson	27																											7	32	34	17.92
53	Joe Mihalic		37		17	7																				23				16		17.625
54	Grant Adcox		DNQ		18		25				38																		18			16.6
55	Henley Gray											13				22			14					32		9		DNQ				15.76
56	Jimmy Crawford		19		26						DNQ						36			31		Wth										14.76
57	Sam McQuagg		DNQ					7			8			32																		14.1
58	John Martin						31				42										23										38	13.36
59	Ron Keselowski															24	28						29						16			13.32
60	Bill Dennis		21	8	7																								QL			12.18
61	Sonny Easley	12													7																26	11.85
62	L. D. Ottinger		29			25											37	25														11.24
63	Jim Bray		DNQ										33								35		34			21						10.42
64	Harry Gant								8					14															35			10.305
65	Johnny Barnes							27														47			25	40						9.86
66	Dick Skillen		DNQ		21			25						18										Wth								9.645
67	Jimmy Insolo	23													22																19	9.48
68	Ernie Shaw									21			26					18	16													8.92
69	Jerry Hansen																					25	26	38								8.865
70	Randy Tissot		DNQ					23			32			35																		8.31
71	Charlie Roberts	16			40			35																								7.17
72	Jack McCoy	21													34																33	7.05
73	Pee Wee Wentz		DNQ					31																10				23				5.94
74	Chuck Wahl														8																20	5.4
75	Dick May	14	DNQ													QL						18										5.32
76	Don Reynolds														10																18	5.3
77	Red Farmer		DNQ								27											23										5.22
78	Jim Hurtubise		25				23																									5.2
79	Glenn Francis														13																22	4.7
80	Johnny Ray										41											22										4.57
81	George England																								26	27	29	QL				4.525
82	Johnny Rutherford		24														39												24			4.16
83	Jimmy Hensley									6																		19				4.02
84	Johnny Anderson	20													28																	3.76
85	Bill Osborne	26																													28	3.75
86	Terry Link		DNQ								43											37										3.72
87	Neil Bonnett										45											39										3.52
88	Jody Ridley						33																							30		3.17
89	Walt Price														21																31	3.1
90	Dick Bown														30																	2.81
91	Hugh Pearson														19																37	2.77
92	Rick Newsom																							DNQ		14	22					2.75
93	Chuck Bown	35													20																39	2.7
94	Eddie Pettyjohn												32													24						2.57
95	Ray Elder	34																													36	2.27
96	Bobby Fleming					15				30																						2.05
97	Joey Arrington																								27		12					1.97
98	Jack Donohue											19	29																			1.94
99	Ross Surgenor	33													12																	1.845
100	Jerry Hufflin			25					23																							1.75
101	Bruce Hill																														13	1.575
102	Iggy Katona										20																					1.575
103	Jan Opperman																				8											1.55
104	J. C. Danielson	11																														1.425
105	Eddie Bradshaw														9																	1.375
106	Kenny Brightbill																				10					8						1.325
107	Buck Peralta														11																DNQ	1.25
108	Richard White	19																														1.2
109	Billy Scott													24																		1.175
110	Satch Worley																											9				1.1
111	Odie Robertson	24																														1.075
112	Leon Fox														14																	1.06
113	Jim Gilliam	25																														1.025
114	Phil Finney		DNQ																			31										1.01
115	Earl Brooks																							40								1
116	Don Hall																														27	0.95
117	Clyde Dagit																						18									0.895
118	Jack Simpson														16																	0.875
119	Markey James														18																	0.845
120	Larry Esau	29																														0.825
121	Jerry Grant	30																														0.775
122	Harry Schilling														24																	0.755
123	Gary Matthews														26																	0.725
124	George Behlman														29																DNQ	0.695
125	Gary Myers																					Wth	36			34						0.695
126	Don Pruitt	32																														0.67
127	Jim Lee														32																	0.65
128	Ray Hendrick																											18				0.62
129	Charlie Blanton				28																											0.62
130	Larry Richardson														DNQ				DNQ		28											0.62
131	Jimmy Hailey			14																												0.615
132	Sonny Hutchins																											21				0.59
133	Richard D. Brown												35																			0.545
134	Randy Hutchison																											27				0.53
135	Larry Manning																									39						0.53
136	Paul Radford																											30				0.5
137	Bobby Ore																		17													0.44
138	Ronnie Childress								30																							0.3
139	Joe Millikan																													17		
140	Dub Simpson																		19													
141	Bob Whitlow																						19									
142	Jerry Sisco											22																				
143	Marv Acton								26																							
144	Wally Dallenbach Sr.																												29			
145	Budd Hagelin	31																														
146	Dick Simon	DNQ	31																													
147	John Banks																						33									
148	A. J. Reno																					45										
149	Bob McGinty	DNQ																														
150	Billy Vukovich Jr.	DNQ																														
151	Rick Catalano	DNQ																														
152	Eddie Bond		DNQ																													
153	G. T. Tallas		DNQ																													
154	Jimmy Crowe		DNQ																													
155	Robert Brown										DNQ																					
156	Bob Kennedy														DNQ																	
157	Ed Sauer																										DNQ					
158	Bob Nott																														DNQ	
159	Don Noel																														DNQ	
Pos.	Driver	RIV	DAY	RCH	CAR	BRI	ATL	DAR	NWS	MAR	TAL	NSV	DOV	CLT	RIV	MCH	DAY	BRI	NSV	ATL	POC	TAL	MCH	DAR	RCH	DOV	NWS	MAR	CLT	CAR	ONT	Pts

== See also ==
- 1974 NASCAR Winston West Series
