= Charlie Blanton =

American racecar driver (1935–2018)

- Born: December 29, 1935; Gaffney, South Carolina, United States
- Died: October 17, 2018 (aged 82)

NASCAR Cup Series career
- 3 races run over 3 years
- Best finish: 82nd - 1973 NASCAR Winston Cup Series season
- First race: 1973 World 600 (Charlotte Motor Speedway)
- Last race: 1978 American 500 (North Carolina Motor Speedway)
Wins	Top tens	Poles
0	0	0

Charlie Blanton (December 29, 1935 – October 17, 2018) was a NASCAR Winston Cup Series race car driver who raced from 1973 to 1978.

== Career ==
This driver participated in 634 laps of racing action - the equivalent of 814.3 miles (1,310.5 km). He would earn a total of $3,135 in his total racing career ($15,475.06 when adjusted for inflation) while starting and finishing in 27th place on average. He appeared in the January 1970 issue of Popular Mechanics alongside Tiny Lund, Buck Baker, Randy Hutchison, Marty Robbins, and Jim Vandiver.

One of Blanton's more notable non-Winston Cup Series performances was at the 1971 Florida Citrus 250; a NASCAR Grand American Series event where Blanton finished in fourth place. The race took two hours and twenty-nine minutes to finish. While never winning at the Winston Cup Series level, Blanton did exceptionally well on dirt tracks in the other series; he managed to finish in second to David Pearson at the 1972 Bold City 200 in Jacksonville, Florida.

Blanton was the winner of the 1973 Daytona ARCA 300 race. His primary car in the NASCAR Cup Series would be the No. 59 Chevrolet sponsored by Mr. Danny Queen.
