= Bob Burcham =

American racing driver (1935–2009)

Robert Wayne "Bob" Burcham, Sr.
- Bob Burcham
- Born: August 22, 1935; Rossville, Georgia, United States
- Died: April 10, 2009 (aged 73)

NASCAR Cup Series career
- 36 races run over 8 years
- Best finish: 24th (1974)
- First race: 1968 Volunteer 500 (Bristol)
- Last race: 1979 Talladega 500 (Talladega)
Wins	Top tens	Poles
0	6	0

Robert Wayne Burcham, Sr. (August 22, 1935 – April 10, 2009) was a NASCAR Winston Cup Series driver whose career spanned from 1968 to 1979. His primary ride was the No. 19 Belden Asphalt-sponsored Chevrolet of Henley Gray. Jack White was Burcham's other employer in NASCAR.

== Career ==
Burcham's parents were Robert "Bobby" and Opal Burcham; they lived near the interstate border that divided Georgia and Tennessee. Burcham's father was an automobile repair shop operator and Bob learned the secrets of the trade from him. He managed to lead two laps out of 7,548 that he raced – for a grand total of 10,955.3 miles (17,630.8 km). Amazingly enough, Burcham's first Winston Cup Series ride was with a 1973 Chevrolet Chevelle; which saw some action at Daytona International Speedway and a few other race tracks. Most of his "top ten" finishes were in the 1974 Winston Cup Series season. A fourth-place finish in Nashville during the 1974 season was his best finish. After NASCAR, Burcham was self-employed in real estate. A total amount of $65,578 in total earnings ($290,906.53 when adjusted for inflation) was earned by Burcham after starting an average of 25th place and finishing an average of 20th place in his NASCAR Cup Series career.

Burcham has a widow named Jean Knight Burcham in addition to his married daughter Vickie Jean and his son Bobby Burcham, Jr. In 2009, Burcham was elected into the Georgia Racing Hall of Fame.
