= Sam McQuagg =

American racing driver (1937–2009)

- McQuagg in 1965
- Born: November 11, 1937; Columbus, Georgia, U.S.
- Died: January 3, 2009 (aged 71)
- Awards: 1965 NASCAR Rookie of the Year; Inducted in the Georgia Automobile Racing Hall of Fame

NASCAR Cup Series career
- 62 races run over 8 years
- Best finish: 15th (1966)
- First race: 1962 untitled race (Valdosta Speedway)
- Last race: 1974 World 600 (Charlotte)
- First win: 1966 Firecracker 400 (Daytona)
Wins	Top tens	Poles
1	21	0

Samuel McQuagg (November 11, 1937 – January 3, 2009) was an American NASCAR Rookie of the Year driver.

== Career ==
Born in Columbus, Georgia, McQuagg was named NASCAR Rookie of the Year in 1965 after achieving five top-ten finishes in 16 races. McQuagg was a major player in an incident in one of the wildest NASCAR races ever. McQuagg was leading the 1965 Southern 500 when Cale Yarborough tried to muscle past him for the lead. Yarborough flew over the guardrail, rolled around six times, and ended up at the end of the parking lot by a light post. Yarborough waved to the crowd as he walked back to the pits. A video clip of the wreck was used on ABC's Wide World of Sports for several years. The race was eventually won by 14 laps by Ned Jarrett.

Dodge noticed his accomplishments in his small Ford team and hired him to their factory team. He was the first driver to use a spoiler. He used the spoiler to win the Firecracker 400 at Daytona International Speedway; the flag from the Firecracker 400 now hangs on his grandson's wall. His Dodge Charger was sponsored by a newlywed Georgia couple. McQuagg was also the first driver to bring a motorhome into the Daytona garage area.

In 1967, McQuagg was hired to drive Cotton Owens' Dodge. He ran 14 races and had three top-five finishes. On lap 81 of an event at Darlington, he tangled with another driver, went over the guardrail, and flipped numerous times before coming to a rest. The wrecks frustrated McQuagg, and he scaled back his schedule to mainly local tracks. He retired from racing to become a commercial pilot, which was a skill he had learned to travel quickly between races. His last start came in the 1974 World 600.

== Personal life and death ==
McQuagg died of cancer on January 3, 2009, at the age of 71. He and his wife Joy had recently celebrated their 54th wedding anniversary.
