= 1974 World 600 =

Auto race held at Charlotte Motor Speedway in 1974

Race details
- Race 13 of 30 in the 1974 NASCAR Winston Cup Series season
- Layout of Charlotte Motor Speedway
- Date: May 26, 1974
- Official name: World 600
- Location: Charlotte Motor Speedway, Concord, North Carolina
- Course: Permanent racing facility
- Course length: 1.500 miles (2.414 km)
- Distance: 400 laps, 600 mi (965 km)
- Weather: Warm with temperatures of 81 °F (27 °C); wind speeds of 13 miles per hour (21 km/h)
- Average speed: 135.720 miles per hour (218.420 km/h)
- Attendance: 84,000

Pole position
Driver	David Pearson	Wood Brothers

Most laps led
Driver	David Pearson	Wood Brothers
- Laps: 161

Winner
No. 21	David Pearson	Wood Brothers

Television in the United States
- Network: untelevised
- Announcers: none

The 1974 World 600, the 15th running of the event, was a NASCAR Winston Cup Series event that was held on May 26, 1974, at Charlotte Motor Speedway in Concord, North Carolina.

This would be the first time the World 600 and Indianapolis 500 were raced on the same day.

== Race report ==
The race was shortened by 40 laps due to the energy crisis of that year. The lead changed 37 times among David Pearson, Richard Petty, Cale Yarborough, Buddy Baker, and Donnie Allison. Allison and Baker fell out with engine failures while Yarborough spun out early in the race, raced back to the front, then crashed out in the final 20 laps.

The race took three hours and fifty-eight minutes. Eight cautions slowed the race for 48 laps. The average speed was 135.72 miles per hour (218.42 km/h). Pearson defeated Petty by 0.6 seconds in front of eighty-four thousand people. The late Jim Vandiver came home in eighth place in his signature #31 Dodge. This would be Pearson's second World 600 victory. His first career Cup win was in this event in 1961.

Sam McQuagg would make his final start in this race before retiring from NASCAR; McQuagg was teammates with Bobby Isaac; they retired on lap 187 due to vehicle problems. He would later become a commercial pilot for the W. C. Bradly Co. in Columbus, Georgia and would eventually die of cancer in 2009.

Individual earnings for each driver ranged from the winner's share of $26,400 ($172,348 when adjusted for inflation) to the last-place finisher's share of $1,075 ($7,018 when adjusted for inflation). NASCAR allocated a grand total of $167,305 ($1,092,224 when adjusted for inflation).

=== Qualifying ===
Grid	No.	Driver	Manufacturer
1	21	David Pearson	'73 Mercury
2	43	Richard Petty	'74 Dodge
3	15	Buddy Baker	'73 Ford
4	11	Cale Yarborough	'74 Chevrolet
5	90	Charlie Glotzbach	'72 Ford
6	32	Dick Brooks	'74 Dodge
7	72	Benny Parsons	'74 Chevrolet
8	54	Lennie Pond	'74 Chevrolet
9	52	Earl Ross	'74 Chevrolet
10	06	Neil Castles	'73 Dodge
11	57	Bob Burcham	'74 Chevrolet
12	5	Harry Gant	'74 Dodge
13	98	Richie Panch	'72 Ford
14	31	Jim Vandiver	'72 Dodge
15	28	Sam McQuagg	'73 Chevrolet
16	88	Donnie Allison	'74 Chevrolet
17	29	Bobby Isaac	'74 Chevrolet
18	95	Darrell Waltrip	'74 Chevrolet
19	18	Joe Frasson	'74 Dodge
20	96	Richard Childress	'73 Chevrolet
21	79	Frank Warren	'74 Dodge
22	1	Billy Scott	'74 Chevrolet
23	12	Bobby Allison	'74 Chevrolet
24	48	James Hylton	'74 Chevrolet
25	35	Dan Daughtry	'72 Ford

== Finishing order ==
Note: Each driver would get an additional 40 laps due to the then-current energy crisis (which officially ended in 1980).

1. David Pearson† (No. 21)
2. Richard Petty (No. 43)
3. Bobby Allison† (No. 12)
4. Darrell Waltrip (No. 95)
5. Earl Ross† (No. 52)
6. Dave Marcis (No. 2)
7. Dick Trickle† (No. 81)
8. Jim Vandiver† (No. 31)
9. David Sisco† (No. 05)
10. J.D. McDuffie† (No. 70)
11. Cale Yarborough*† (No. 11)
12. Walter Ballard (No. 30)
13. Roy Mayne† (No. 25)
14. Harry Gant (No. 5)
15. James Hylton*† (No. 48)
16. Neil Castles† (No. 06)
17. Frank Warren† (No. 79)
18. Dick Skillen (No. 78)
19. Buddy Arrington*† (No. 67)
20. Lennie Pond*† (No. 54)
21. Tony Bettenhausen Jr.† (No. 9)
22. Buddy Baker*† (No. 15)
23. Richie Panch*† (No. 98)
24. Bill Scott* (No. 1)
25. G.C. Spencer*† (No. 49)
26. Travis Tiller*† (No. 46)
27. Dick Brooks*† (No. 32)
28. Cecil Gordon*† (No. 24)
29. Dan Daughtry*† (No. 35)
30. Donnie Allison* (No. 88)
31. Benny Parsons*† (No. 72)
32. Sam McQuagg*† (No. 28)
33. Bobby Isaac*† (No. 29)
34. Richard Childress* (No. 96)
35. Randy Tissot* (No. 74)
36. Bob Burcham*† (No. 57)
37. Charlie Glotzbach*† (No. 90)
38. Coo Coo Marlin*† (No. 14)
39. Jackie Rogers* (No. 93)
40. Joe Frasson*† (No. 18)

† signifies that the driver is known to be deceased
* Driver failed to finish race

Preceded by 1974 Mason-Dixon 500	NASCAR Winston Cup Series races 1974	Succeeded by 1974 Tuborg 400

Preceded by 1973	World 600 races 1974	Succeeded by 1975
