= 1976 Volunteer 400 =

Auto race held at Bristol International Speedway in 1976

Race details
- Race 21 of 30 in the 1976 NASCAR Winston Cup Series season
- Layout of Bristol Motor Speedway
- Date: August 29, 1976
- Official name: Volunteer 400
- Location: Bristol International Speedway, Bristol, Tennessee
- Course: Permanent racing facility
- Course length: 0.533 miles (0.857 km)
- Distance: 400 laps, 166.5 mi (328.8 km)
- Weather: Temperatures of 84.9 °F (29.4 °C); wind speeds of 10.9 miles per hour (17.5 km/h)
- Average speed: 99.175 miles per hour (159.607 km/h)
- Attendance: 12,000

Pole position
Driver	Darrell Waltrip	DiGard Motorsports

Most laps led
Driver	Cale Yarborough	Junior Johnson & Associates
- Laps: 373

Winner
No. 11	Cale Yarborough	Junior Johnson & Associates

Television in the United States
- Network: untelevised
- Announcers: none

The 1976 Volunteer 400 was a NASCAR Winston Cup Series race that took place on August 29, 1976, at Bristol International Speedway in Bristol, Tennessee.

The five drivers that dominated the 1976 NASCAR Winston Cup Series season were David Pearson (average finish of 7th place), Cale Yarborough (average finish of 8th place), Richard Petty (average finish of 9th place), Benny Parsons (average finish of 10th place), and Bobby Allison (average finish 12th place).

== Race report ==
This race took two hours and eighteen minutes to complete in front of twelve thousand fans. Two cautions slowed the race for thirteen laps. Cale Yarborough defeated Richard Petty by more than two laps. Other notable drivers included Darrell Waltrip, Benny Parsons, Richard Childress, J.D. McDuffie, and Elmo Langley.

Joe Frasson ran out of tires on lap 5 while Ed Negre would lose the rear end of his vehicle on lap 12. Dean Dalton's transmission would stop working on lap 15. Gary Myers would blow his engine on lap 35 while Walter Ballard would do the identical thing on lap 55. Elmo Langley would ruin his vehicle's engine on lap 106. Clyde Lynn would wreck the transmission of his car on lap 123. J.D. McDuffie's engine only could make it to lap 154 while Dave Marcis' engine lasted until 248. Cecil Gordon's engine would last until lap 270; when he had to leave the race. Frank Warren was the lowest finishing driver to complete the entire race without any mechanical problems.

Clyde Lynn would retire after this event.

Notable speeds at the race were: 99.175 miles per hour (159.607 km/h) as the average speed and 110.300 miles per hour (177.511 km/h) as the pole position speed achieved by Darrell Waltrip in qualifying.

The points leader after this event would be Cale Yarborough. He would go on to become the NASCAR Cup Series champion at the end of the season.

The drivers competed for the purse which was $61,105 ($345,725.66 when adjusted for inflation). Yarborough earned the largest share with $10,025 ($56,720.39 when adjusted for inflation) while last-place finisher Joe Frasson walked away with $400 ($2,263.16 when adjusted for inflation).

=== Qualifying ===
Grid	No.	Driver	Manufacturer	Speed	Owner
1	88	Darrell Waltrip	Chevrolet	110.307	DiGard
2	11	Cale Yarborough	Chevrolet	110.123	Junior Johnson
3	15	Buddy Baker	Ford	109.401	Bud Moore
4	72	Benny Parsons	Chevrolet	109.314	L.G. DeWitt
5	90	Dick Brooks	Ford	109.308	Junie Donlavey
6	54	Lennie Pond	Chevrolet	109.305	Ronnie Elder
7	71	Dave Marcis	Dodge	108.991	Nord Krauskopf
8	2	Bobby Allison	Mercury	108.757	Roger Penske
9	43	Richard Petty	Dodge	108.217	Petty Enterprises
10	30	Terry Bivins	Chevrolet	107.749	Walter Ballard

== Finishing order ==
Section reference:

1. Cale Yarborough† (No. 11)
2. Richard Petty (No. 43)
3. Darrell Waltrip (No. 88)
4. Benny Parsons† (No. 72)
5. Buddy Baker† (No. 15)
6. Bobby Allison (No. 2)
7. Dick Brooks† (No. 90)
8. Lennie Pond (No. 54)
9. Bobby Wawak† (No. 36)
10. Richard Childress (No. 3)
11. D.K. Ulrich (No. 40)
12. Terry Bivins (No. 30)
13. James Hylton† (No. 48)
14. David Sisco (No. 05)
15. Henley Gray (No. 19)
16. Dick May† (No. 25)
17. Buddy Arrington (No. 67)
18. Skip Manning (No. 92)
19. Jimmy Means (No. 52)
20. Frank Warren (No. 79)
21. Cecil Gordon*† (No. 24)
22. Dave Marcis* (No. 71)
23. J.D. McDuffie*† (No. 70)
24. Clyde Lynn*† (No. 10)
25. Elmo Langley*† (No. 64)
26. Walter Ballard* (No. 45)
27. Gary Myers* (No. 04)
28. Dean Dalton* (No. 7)
29. Ed Negre* (No. 8)
30. Joe Frasson*† (No. 18)

† signifies that the driver is known to be deceased
* Driver failed to finish race

== Standings after the race ==
Pos	Driver	Points	Differential
1	Cale Yarborough	3211	0
2	Benny Parsons	3112	-99
3	Richard Petty	3106	-105
4	Bobby Allison	2982	-229
5	Dave Marcis	2749	-462
6	Lennie Pond	2741	-470
7	Richard Childress	2611	-600
8	Buddy Baker	2575	-636
9 ▲	Frank Warren	2364	-847
10	J.D. McDuffie	2357	-854

Preceded by 1976 Champion Spark Plug 400	NASCAR Winston Cup Season; 1976	Succeeded by 1976 Southern 500
