= 1975 World 600 =

Auto race held at Charlotte Motor Speedway in 1975

Race details
- Race 13 of 30 in the 1975 NASCAR Winston Cup Series season
- Layout of Charlotte Motor Speedway
- Date: May 25, 1975
- Location: Charlotte Motor Speedway, Concord, North Carolina
- Course: Permanent racing facility
- Course length: 1.500 miles (2.410 km)
- Distance: 400 laps, 600 mi (965 km)
- Weather: Extremely hot with temperatures reaching as high as 91 °F (33 °C); wind speeds up to 8.9 miles per hour (14.3 km/h)
- Average speed: 142.255 miles per hour (228.937 km/h)
- Attendance: 90,600

Pole position
Driver	David Pearson	Wood Brothers
- Time: 33.887

Most laps led
Driver	Richard Petty	Petty Enterprises
- Laps: 234

Winner
No. 43	Richard Petty	Petty Enterprises

Television in the United States
- Network: CBS
- Announcers: Ken Squier

The 1975 World 600, the 16th running of the event, was a NASCAR Winston Cup Series racing event that took place on May 25, 1975, at Charlotte Motor Speedway in Concord, North Carolina.

== Race report ==
There were 40 drivers on the grid. Coo Coo Marlin had an engine problem on lap 33 out of 400 laps - earning him a last place position and $1,455 ($87,075 when adjusted for inflation). Richard Petty would defeat Cale Yarborough by one lap in front of 90,600 spectators; who had no idea that history was being made right before their eyes. Petty would earn $30,290 ($181,234 in when adjusted for inflation) on his long anticipated first win at Charlotte, despite having to change four tires early in the race and falling behind a lap. Petty rallied back and proceeded to lap the field.

Future Seven Time Winston Cup Series Champion Dale Earnhardt would make his debut here; finishing 22nd in a Dodge vehicle. African-American driver Randy Bethea would race his only NASCAR Cup Series race here; he would complete in 251 laps before engine problems relegated him to the sideline. Joe Frasson failed to qualify for this race while Darel Dieringer would make his NASCAR comeback here. Richard Childress would also compete in his event; finishing one place behind his future employee Dale Earnhardt. Both drivers were running at the finish, 45 laps down.

Other drivers who failed to qualify were Bill Dennis (#20), Ferrel Harris (#82), Carl Adams (#65), and Elmo Langley (#64).

== Results ==
=== Top 10 finishers ===
Pos	Grid	No.	Driver	Manufacturer	Laps	Laps led	Points	Time/Status
1	3	43	Richard Petty	Dodge	400	234	185	4:07:42
2	5	11	Cale Yarborough	Chevrolet	399	149	175	+1 lap
3	1	21	David Pearson	Mercury	396	8	170	+4 laps
4	6	17	Darrell Waltrip	Chevrolet	395	0	160	+5 laps
5	4	15	Buddy Baker	Ford	395	0	155	+5 laps
6	9	28	Charlie Glotzbach	Chevrolet	395	0	150	+5 laps
7	10	90	Dick Brooks	Ford	392	0	146	+8 laps
8	13	98	Richie Panch	Chevrolet	389	2	147	+11 laps
9	7	88	Donnie Allison	Chevrolet	386	0	138	+14 laps
10	29	30	Walter Ballard	Chevrolet	377	0	134	+23 laps

=== Timeline ===
Section reference:

- Start of race: Lennie Pond officially began the event with the pole position.
- Lap 14: Randy Bethea spun out on turn three, bringing out the first caution of the race which ended on lap 17.
- Lap 33: Coo Coo Marlin's engine expired, making him the last-place finisher.
- Lap 55: Benny Parsons blew his engine while racing.
- Lap 96: G.C. Spencer managed to blow his engine while racing at high speeds.
- Lap 112: Travis Tiller spun out on turn two, bringing out the second caution of the race which ended on lap 115.
- Lap 114: Cale Yarborough took over the lead from Richard Petty before losing it to Richard Petty on lap 166.
- Lap 157: Cecil Gordons engine blew, forcing him to exit the race prematurely.
- Lap 165: Dick Brooks spun out on turn two, bringing the third caution of the race which ended on lap 168.
- Lap 166: Richard Petty took over the lead from Cale Yarborough before losing it back to Cale Yarborough on lap 231.
- Lap 198: Lennie Pond's transmission became failed, making him the first DNF in the race not related to a vehicle's engine.
- Lap 208: Bobby Isaac's vehicle had vibration issues, forcing him off the track.
- Lap 236: Richard Petty took over the lead from David Pearson before losing it to Cale Yarborough on lap 297.
- Lap 239: Dave Marcis blew his engine while racing, forcing him to retire from the race.
- Lap 251: Randy Betheas engine failed in his only NASCAR Cup Series race.
- Lap 298: Richard Petty took over the lead from Cale Yarborough, making the decisive move that would get Petty the race win.
- Lap 306: Harry Gant managed to blow his engine, ending his day on the track.
- Lap 349: Dick Skillen managed to blow his engine, causing him to leave the race early.
- Lap 373: Darel Dieringer managed to blow his engine, forcing him to accept a 12th-place finish.
- Finish: Richard Petty was officially declared the winner of the event.

== Standings after the race ==
Pos	Driver	Points	Differential
1	Richard Petty	2094	0
2 ▲	Darrell Waltrip	1716	-378
3 ▲	James Hylton	1702	-392
4 ▼	Dave Marcis	1683	-411
5 ▼	Cecil Gordon	1653	-441
6 ▼	Benny Parsons	1611	-483
7	Richard Childress	1588	-506
8 ▲	David Pearson	1479	-615
9 ▲	Dick Brooks	1447	-647
10 ▼	Elmo Langley	1433	-661

Preceded by 1975 Mason-Dixon 500	NASCAR Winston Cup Series Season; 1975	Succeeded by 1975 Tuborg 400

Preceded by 1974	World 600 races 1975	Succeeded by 1976
