= Randy Hutchison =

American racing driver (born 1948)

- Born: August 25, 1948 (age 78); Newport News, Virginia, U.S.

NASCAR Cup Series career
- 7 races run over 2 years
- Best finish: 134th - 1974 NASCAR Winston Cup Series season
- First race: 1971 Myers Brothers 250 (Bowman-Gray Stadium)
- Last race: 1974 Old Dominion 500 (Martinsville Speedway)
Wins	Top tens	Poles
0	1	0

Randy Hutchison (born August 25, 1948 at Newport News, Virginia, USA) is a retired NASCAR Winston Cup Series driver who raced a grand total of 1299 laps and 590.2 miles (949.8 km) in his career. While his career was brief, Hutchison is most notable for his only top-ten finish at the 1971 Sandlapper 200. This driver had an average career start of 18th place and a career average finish of 19th place.
