= Richie Panch =

Former NASCAR driver

Richard "Richie" Panch
- Panch, circa 1970s
- Born: May 28, 1954; Daytona Beach, Florida, U.S.
- Died: September 1, 1985 (aged 31) near Rion, South Carolina, U.S.
- Cause of death: Plane crash

NASCAR Cup Series career
- 47 races run over 4 years
- Best finish: 14th – 1974 NASCAR Winston Cup Series season
- First race: 1973 Rebel 500 (Darlington Raceway)
- Last race: 1976 Dixie 500 (Atlanta International Raceway)
Wins	Top tens	Poles
0	11	0

Richard Panch (May 28, 1954 – September 1, 1985) was an American NASCAR Winston Cup Series driver from 1973 to 1976. He was born in Daytona Beach, Florida, and was the son of NASCAR Cup Series veteran Marvin Panch.

== Career ==
Panch had officially raced a grand total of 9,295 laps - the equivalent of 11,040.9 miles (17,768.6 km) of stock car racing – and had led nine of them. His average start was 18th place while his average finish was 23rd place. His total earnings were US$90,842 (US$513,974.47 when adjusted for inflation).

== Death ==
Panch was killed on September 1, 1985, along with the other three people aboard a Piper PA-28 Cherokee that flew into a squall line and heavy rain near Rion, South Carolina, and came apart in mid-air.
