= 1973 Atlanta 500 =

Auto race held at Atlanta International Raceway in 1973

Race details
- Race 6 of 28 in the 1973 NASCAR Winston Cup Series
- Layout of Atlanta Motor Speedway prior to 1996
- Date: April 1, 1973
- Official name: Atlanta 500
- Location: Atlanta International Raceway, Hampton, Georgia
- Course: Permanent racing facility
- Course length: 1.522 miles (2.449 km)
- Distance: 328 laps, 499.2 mi (803.3 km)
- Weather: Temperatures reaching of 72 °F (22 °C); wind speeds of 24.1 miles per hour (38.8 km/h)
- Average speed: 139.351 miles per hour (224.264 km/h)
- Attendance: 46,000

Pole position
Driver	Gordon Johncock	Ellington Racing

Most laps led
Driver	David Pearson	Wood Brothers Racing
- Laps: 155

Winner
No. 21	David Pearson	Wood Brothers Racing

Television in the United States
- Network: ABC
- Announcers: Keith Jackson; Chris Economaki

The 1973 Atlanta 500 was the sixth race in the NASCAR 1973 Winston Cup Series, held on April 1, 1973, at Atlanta International Raceway in Hampton, Georgia. The race took three hours and thirty-four minutes.

Attendance to this event has varying estimates. Many racing statistic archives list it at 46,000 people; the Associated Press reported a figure of 72,000 the day after the race.

== Car flip world record ==
At this event, daredevil Dusty Russell flipped a stock car in the air and landed 157 feet after a five foot ramp, in what was then a world record. He suffered a broken nose.

== Race report ==
No time trials were conducted due to weather. The average speed of the race was 139.351 miles per hour (224.264 km/h). There were only five traditional single-car owners at this race.

Souvenir programs were sold at this event for US$2 (US$14.51 when adjusted for inflation).

David Pearson defeated Bobby Isaac in his 1971 Mercury Cyclone by two laps; Four cautions slowed the race for 31 laps. This would be David Pearson's second win in 1973 when he won 11 races of the 18 he entered.

Tony Bettenhausen Jr. was the last-place finisher due to an oil leak on lap 9 out of 328. After Darrell Waltrip's car was eliminated from the race (he charged to fifth place but was involved in a crash with Richard Petty and Buddy Baker), he substituted for A.J. Foyt. Pete Hamilton and Mark Donohue would retire from NASCAR after this race while Charles Barrett and Bettenhausen Jr. would make their introductions to the Cup Series.

The winner received US$16,625 in race winnings (US$120,575 when adjusted for inflation) while the last place finisher received US$900 (US$6,527 when adjusted for inflation). The total prize purse was US$103,485 (US$750,538 when adjusted for inflation).

Notable crew chiefs included Tim Brewer, Jake Elder, Travis Carter, Harry Hyde, Dale Inman, Tom Vandiver, and Bud Moore.

=== Starting grid ===
Grid	No.	Driver	Manufacturer	Owner
1	28	Gordon Johncock	'72 Chevrolet	Hoss Ellington
2	15	Bobby Isaac	'72 Ford	Bud Moore
3	31	Jim Vandiver	'72 Dodge	O.L. Nixon
4	11	Cale Yarborough	'73 Chevrolet	Richard Howard
5	72	Benny Parsons	'72 Chevrolet	L.G. DeWitt
6	12	Bobby Allison	'73 Chevrolet	Bobby Allison
7	18	Joe Frasson	'73 Dodge	Joe Frasson
8	71	Buddy Baker	'73 Dodge	Nord Krauskopf
9	21	David Pearson	'71 Mercury	Wood Brothers
10	22	Pete Hamilton	'72 Plymouth	Crawford Brothers

Failed to qualify: Eddie Bond (#0), Tony Bettenhausen Jr. (#38), John Utsman (#49)

== Finishing order ==
Section reference:

1. David Pearson (No. 21)
2. Bobby Isaac (No. 15)
3. Benny Parsons (No. 72)
4. Buddy Baker (No. 71)
5. Cale Yarborough (No. 11)
6. Coo Coo Marlin (No. 14)
7. Dick Brooks (No. 90)
8. Cecil Gordon (No. 24)
9. Clarence Lovell (No. 61)
10. Jim Vandiver (No. 31)
11. Gordon Johncock (No. 28)
12. Dave Marcis (No. 2)
13. Richard Childress (No. 96)
14. Walter Ballard (No. 30)
15. Buddy Arrington (No. 67)
16. Frank Warren (No. 79)
17. Raymond Williams (No. 47)
18. Charles Barrett (No. 09)
19. Johnny Barnes (No. 89)
20. Larry Smith (No. 92)
21. James Hylton (No. 48)
22. Earle Canavan (No. 01)
23. Dean Dalton* (No. 7)
24. Ed Negre (No. 8)
25. Charlie Roberts (No. 77)
26. Elmo Langley (No. 64)
27. A. J. Foyt* (No. 50)
28. Joe Frasson* (No. 18)
29. Bill Champion* (No. 10)
30. Mark Donohue* (No. 16)
31. Ron Keselowski* (No. 88)
32. Roy Mayne* (No. 25)
33. Darrell Waltrip* (No. 95)
34. Richard Petty* (No. 43)
35. Bobby Allison* (No. 12)
36. John Sears* (No. 4)
37. Bobby Mausgrover* (No. 07)
38. Tiny Lund* (No. 55)
39. Pete Hamilton* (No. 22)
40. Tony Bettenhausen Jr.* (No. 84)

* Driver failed to finish race

Preceded by 1973 Southeastern 500	NASCAR Winston Cup Series Season; 1973	Succeeded by 1973 Gwyn Staley 400
