= 1973 World 600 =

Auto race run in North Carolina in 1973

Race details
- Race 12 of 28 in the 1973 NASCAR Winston Cup Series
- 1973 World 600 program cover
- Date: May 27, 1973
- Official name: World 600
- Location: Charlotte Motor Speedway, Concord, North Carolina
- Course: Permanent racing facility
- Course length: 1.500 miles (2.414 km)
- Distance: 400 laps, 600 mi (965.606 km)
- Weather: Temperatures reaching of 75.9 °F (24.4 °C); wind speeds of 11.1 miles per hour (17.9 km/h)
- Average speed: 134.890 mph (217.084 km/h)
- Attendance: 85,000

Pole position
Driver	Buddy Baker	Nord Krauskopf

Most laps led
Driver	Buddy Baker	Nord Krauskopf
- Laps: 220

Winner
No. 71	Buddy Baker	Nord Krauskopf

The 1973 World 600, the 14th running of the event, was a NASCAR Winston Cup Series racing event that was held on May 27, 1973, at Charlotte Motor Speedway in Concord, North Carolina.

== Summary ==
The grid consisted of 40 drivers. Alton Jones would finish in last place due to an engine problem on lap 2 out of the 400 laps that made up the race. Buddy Baker defeated David Pearson by 1.8 seconds in front of 85,000 spectators. Baker made history as he became the first driver to both win this race two years in a row and win the race three times. Six cautions slowed the race for 48 laps. There were 23 different leaders. The race lasted four hours and twenty-six seconds.

Baker would qualify for the pole position with a speed of 158.051 miles per hour (254.358 km/h) while the average race speed was 134.890 miles per hour (217.084 km/h). Other drivers in the top ten included: Cale Yarborough, Bobby Isaac, Benny Parsons, Jim Vandiver, Darrell Waltrip, Cecil Gordon, Dick Brooks, and David Sisco. Ed Negre (#08), David Ray Boggs (#8) and Charlie Roberts failed to qualify for the race.

Peter Gregg had a terrible crash early in the race in the final race for Cotton Owens' famous red #6 Dodges, then Vic Parsons would have a hard crash later on in the race.

Notable crew chiefs in the race were Tim Brewer, Jake Elder, Travis Carter, Harry Hyde, Dale Inman, Vic Ballard, Tom Vandiver, and Bud Moore.

On the day of the race, 0.01 inches of precipitation would be recorded around the speedway. It would be enough rain to delay the race under the caution flag from lap 241 to lap 256.

Cotton Owens would retire as a NASCAR race car owner after this race. David Pearson would be prevented from tying Richard Petty's record of ten consecutive wins at this race. Pearson would end up racking a 105 victories. Bobby Allison skipped this race to do the 1973 Indianapolis 500.

=== Introductions to NASCAR ===
Peter Gregg would make his only NASCAR Cup Series start at this event. Billy Scott and Charlie Blanton would start their respective NASCAR careers at this race and would race for several others.

== Race results ==
Fin	St	#	Driver	Sponsor	Make	Laps	Led	Status
1	1	71	Buddy Baker	K & K Insurance	'73 Dodge	400	220	running
2	2	21	David Pearson	Purolator	'71 Mercury	400	29	running
3	4	11	Cale Yarborough	Kar-Kare	'73 Chevrolet	399	15	running
4	15	15	Bobby Isaac	Sta-Power Industries	'73 Ford	397	0	running
5	8	72	Benny Parsons	Union 76 Racing Oil	'73 Chevrolet	393	1	running
6	16	31	Jim Vandiver	Bradford Enterprises	'72 Dodge	392	0	running
7	13	95	Darrell Waltrip	Kmart, Terminal Transport	'71 Mercury	391	0	running
8	6	24	Cecil Gordon	Panasonic	'72 Chevrolet	384	0	running
9	26	90	Dick Brooks	Truxmore Industries	'73 Ford	378	0	engine
10	32	05	David Sisco	Sisco Racing	'72 Chevrolet	378	0	running
11	28	96	Richard Childress	L.C. Newton Trucking	'73 Chevrolet	373	0	engine
12	25	48	James Hylton	Hylton Engineering	'71 Mercury	373	0	running
13	3	43	Richard Petty	STP	'73 Dodge	370	134	running
14	34	64	Elmo Langley	Langley Racing	'72 Ford	368	0	running
15	21	92	Larry Smith	Carling Black Label	'71 Mercury	368	0	running
16	30	10	Bill Champion	Earl Powell Auto Parts	'71 Ford	366	0	running
17	40	47	Raymond Williams	Jet Way Wax	'72 Ford	366	0	running
18	10	30	Walter Ballard	Ballard Racing	'71 Mercury	354	0	running
19	31	4	Ed Negre	Mills Air Conditioning	'71 Dodge	354	0	running
20	19	5	Charlie Blanton	TravelLodge Motels	'73 Dodge	351	0	engine
21	20	70	J.D. McDuffie	McDuffie Racing	'72 Chevrolet	350	0	running
22	23	1	Billy Scott	Big Chance Special, Ranger Motor Homes	'73 Chevrolet	340	0	running
23	35	79	Frank Warren	Warren Racing	'73 Dodge	287	0	engine
24	5	28	Charlie Glotzbach	Lemon Tree Inn	'73 Chevrolet	281	0	engine
25	9	18	Joe Frasson	Pizza Hut	'73 Dodge	278	1	engine
26	39	45	Vic Parsons	Seifert Rent-A-Racer	'71 Ford	241	0	crash
27	22	09	Charles Barrett	Dahlonega Ford Sales	'71 Ford	241	0	overheating
28	12	2	Dave Marcis	AMC	'73 Matador	204	0	engine
29	17	49	G.C. Spencer	Spencer Racing	'72 Dodge	163	0	steering
30	37	7	Dean Dalton	Belden Asphalt	'71 Mercury	145	0	driveshaft
31	27	25	Jabe Thomas	Robertson Racing	'73 Dodge	117	0	oil leak
32	24	67	Buddy Arrington	Cherokee Construction	'72 Plymouth	100	0	transmission
33	14	14	Coo Coo Marlin	Cunningham-Kelley	'72 Chevrolet	71	0	engine
34	38	06	Neil Castles	Howard Furniture	'73 Dodge	64	0	rear end
35	18	83	Paul Tyler	Smithville Farms	'71 Mercury	52	0	alternator
36	29	55	Tiny Lund	Price Construction	'72 Chevrolet	50	0	engine
37	7	6	Peter Gregg	Jacksonville Dealers, Owens Racing	'72 Dodge	34	0	crash
38	11	54	Lennie Pond	Master Chevy Sales	'73 Chevrolet	14	0	engine
39	36	44	Richard D. Brown	Brown Racing	'72 Chevrolet	4	0	transmission
40	33	3	Alton Jones	Crimson Dale Nursery	'73 Chevrolet	2	0	engine

Preceded by 1973 Music City 420	NASCAR Winston Cup Series Season; 1973	Succeeded by 1973 Mason-Dixon 500

Preceded by 1972	World 600 races 1973	Succeeded by 1974
