= 1974 American 500 =

Auto race held at North Carolina Motor Speedway in 1974

Race details
- Race 29 of 30 in the 1974 NASCAR Winston Cup Series season
- Layout of Rockingham Speedway
- Date: October 20, 1974
- Official name: American 500
- Location: North Carolina Motor Speedway, Rockingham, North Carolina
- Course: Permanent racing facility
- Course length: 1.017 miles (1.637 km)
- Distance: 492 laps, 500.364 mi (805.258 km)
- Weather: Chilly with temperatures of 66.9 °F (19.4 °C); wind speeds of 11.8 miles per hour (19.0 km/h)
- Average speed: 118.493 mph (190.696 km/h)
- Attendance: 35,000

Pole position
Driver	Richard Petty	Petty Enterprises

Most laps led
Driver	Cale Yarborough	Junior Johnson & Associates
- Laps: 231

Winner
No. 21	David Pearson	Wood Brothers Racing

The 1974 American 500 was a NASCAR Winston Cup Series racing event that was held on October 20, 1974, at North Carolina Motor Speedway in Rockingham, North Carolina.

Joe Millikan would make his NASCAR Cup Series debut while Jerry Schild would exit the series in this event. A rare NASCAR Winston Cup appearance by former Champ Car team owner and driver Tony Bettenhausen Jr. would make this race into a landmark event in motorsports history. His first NASCAR appearance was at the 1973 Atlanta 500 while his final appearance at the Cup Series level would be at the 1982 Champion Spark Plug 400.

== Background ==
North Carolina Motor Speedway was the project of Harold Brasington and Bill Land. Brasington, a land developer, also built NASCAR's first superspeedway, Darlington Speedway, in 1950. Land owned the property, which is settled in the sandhills of North Carolina, and together, they set out to find funding. They went to local lawyer Elsie Webb who assembled a group of backers. The duo also sold shares to the locals for $1 per share, and at one time had about 1,000 shareholders.

The speedway was built as a one-mile oval with flat turns. North Carolina Motor Speedway opened on October 31, 1965, holding its first race on the same day. The American 500 was a 500-lap, 500-mile NASCAR Grand National Series race won by Curtis Turner at an average speed of 101.942 miles per hour. Turner dominated the race, which was attended by 35,000 people, leading 239 laps and winning by 11 seconds. The winner's purse was $13,090. The American 500 was the 54th of 55 races in the 1965 season, which included NASCAR legends Cale Yarborough (who finished second), Richard Petty, Ned Jarrett (who would go on to win the championship), Buddy Baker, David Pearson, and Junior Johnson. Only 19 of the 43 cars were running at the end of the race.

The speedway held two Grand National races the next year, the Peach Blossom 500, and The American 500. The Peach Blossom 500 would change names multiple times, usually using the name Carolina 500, before ending as the Subway 400. The American 500 would also change names multiple times as well, ending as the Pop Secret Microwave Popcorn 400. The first race was typically held in early March or late February, and the second race was held in late October. In 1967 and 1968 the Carolina 500 was run in June.

== Race report ==
There were 36 drivers who competed in this 492-lap racing event. All except for Canadian native Earl Ross were born and bred in the United States of America.

Joe Frasson's difficulties in handling his steering problems on lap 4 caused him to be credited with the last-place finish for this event. Elmo Langley became the lowest-finishing driver to finish the event; while J.D. McDuffie would be the last driver to achieve a DNF due to troubles with his stock car engine on lap 447. G.C. Spencer's vehicle suffered from an engine failure on lap 12 while Buddy Baker noticed that his car's brakes stopped working on lap 18. Transmission issues relegated Neil Castles to the sidelines on lap 21. Harry Jefferson's engine stopped working properly on lap 30 while Dick Brooks did terminal damage to his vehicle on lap 52. Engine failures would force Jody Ridley to leave the race on lap 85 and Dave Marcis to stop racing on lap 157.

A faulty vehicular water pump ended Ed Negre's day on lap 240 while terminal vehicle damage on lap 317 would end Richie Panch's race weekend. David Sisco noticed that his vehicle's suspension was giving him problems on lap 357; forcing him to accept a 26th-place finish.

The model years of the vehicles ranged from 1972 to 1974; with most of the field driving Chevrolet and Dodge vehicles.

After four hours and thirteen minutes of racing, David Pearson would defeat Cale Yarborough by slightly more than two seconds in front of an eager audience of 35,000 NASCAR followers. While Richard Petty, Buddy Baker and David Pearson would dominate the opening laps of this event, the final laps would become a "Cale Yarborough and David Pearson show." The average speed of the vehicles in this racing event was 118.493 miles per hour (190.696 km/h) while Richard Petty would metaphorically scorch the track with his solo qualifying speed of 135.297 miles per hour (217.739 km/h).

Individual earnings for each driver ranged for the winner's share of $16,350 ($106,738 when adjusted for inflation) to the last-place finisher's share of $550 ($3,591 when adjusted for inflation). NASCAR officials permitted the handover of $99,465 for all the qualifying drivers of this racing event ($649,341 when adjusted for inflation).

Only manual transmission vehicles were allowed to participate in this race; a policy that NASCAR has retained to the present day.

=== Qualifying ===
Grid	No.	Driver	Manufacturer	Owner
1	43	Richard Petty	'74 Dodge	Petty Enterprises
2	15	Buddy Baker	'74 Ford	Bud Moore
3	21	David Pearson	'73 Mercury	Wood Brothers
4	11	Cale Yarborough	'74 Chevrolet	Junior Johnson
5	28	Dick Brooks	'74 Chevrolet	Dick Brooks
6	12	Bobby Allison	'74 AMC Matador	Roger Penske
7	52	Earl Ross	'74 Chevrolet	Junior Johnson
8	88	Donnie Allison	'74 Chevrolet	DiGard Racing
9	95	Darrell Waltrip	'72 Chevrolet	Darrell Waltrip
10	72	Benny Parsons	'74 Chevrolet	L.G. DeWitt
11	71	Dave Marcis	'74 Dodge	Nord Krauskopf
12	98	Richie Panch	'72 Chevrolet	Roy Thornley
13	54	Lennie Pond	'74 Chevrolet	Ronnie Elder
14	90	Jody Ridley	'72 Ford	Junie Donlavey
15	97	Harry Jefferson	'72 Ford	George Jefferson
16	24	Cecil Gordon	'73 Chevrolet	Cecil Gordon
17	14	Coo Coo Marlin	'73 Chevrolet	H.B. Cunningham
18	07	Jerry Schild	'72 Chevrolet	Rush Johnson
19	96	Richard Childress	'73 Chevrolet	Tom Garn
20	30	Walter Ballard	'74 Chevrolet	Vic Ballard
21	93	Jackie Rogers	'74 Chevrolet	Ray Frederick
22	05	David Sisco	'74 Chevrolet	David Sisco
23	2	Dick Trickle	'73 Mercury	Dave Marcis
24	19	Bob Burcham	'73 Chevrolet	Henley Gray
25	49	G.C. Spencer	'74 Dodge	G.C. Spencer

== Top 10 finishers ==
Pos	Grid	No.	Driver	Manufacturer	Laps	Laps led	Time/Status
1	3	21	David Pearson	Mercury	492	169	4:13:21
2	4	11	Cale Yarborough	Chevrolet	492	231	+2.2 seconds
3	1	43	Richard Petty	Dodge	490	79	+2 laps
4	6	12	Bobby Allison	AMC Matador	487	1	+6 laps
5	9	95	Darrell Waltrip	Chevrolet	487	0	+6 laps
6	8	88	Donnie Allison	Chevrolet	486	0	+7 laps
7	23	2	Dick Trickle	Mercury	483	0	+10 laps
8	7	52	Earl Ross	Chevrolet	482	0	+11 laps
9	10	72	Benny Parsons	Chevrolet	479	0	+14 laps
10	21	93	Jackie Rogers	Chevrolet	479	0	+14 laps

Preceded by 1974 National 500	NASCAR Winston Cup Season; 1974	Succeeded by 1974 Los Angeles Times 500

Preceded by 1973	American 500 races 1974	Succeeded by 1975
