= 1976 Mason-Dixon 500 =

Auto race held at Dover Downs International Speedway in 1976

Race details
- Race 12 of 30 in the 1976 NASCAR Winston Cup Series season
- Layout of Dover International Speedway
- Date: May 16, 1976
- Official name: Mason-Dixon 500
- Location: Dover Downs International Speedway, Dover, Delaware
- Course: Permanent racing facility
- Course length: 1.000 miles (1.609 km)
- Distance: 500 laps, 500.0 mi (804.6 km)
- Weather: Temperatures of 78.1 °F (25.6 °C); wind speeds of 15 miles per hour (24 km/h)
- Average speed: 115.436 miles per hour (185.776 km/h)

Pole position
Driver	Dave Marcis	K&K Insurance Racing

Most laps led
Driver	Cale Yarborough	Junior Johnson & Associates
- Laps: 243

Winner
No. 73	Benny Parsons	DeWitt Racing

Television in the United States
- Network: untelevised
- Announcers: none

The 1976 Mason-Dixon 500 was a NASCAR Winston Cup Series event that took place on May 16, 1976, at Dover Downs International Speedway (now called Dover International Speedway) in Dover, Delaware.

== Background ==
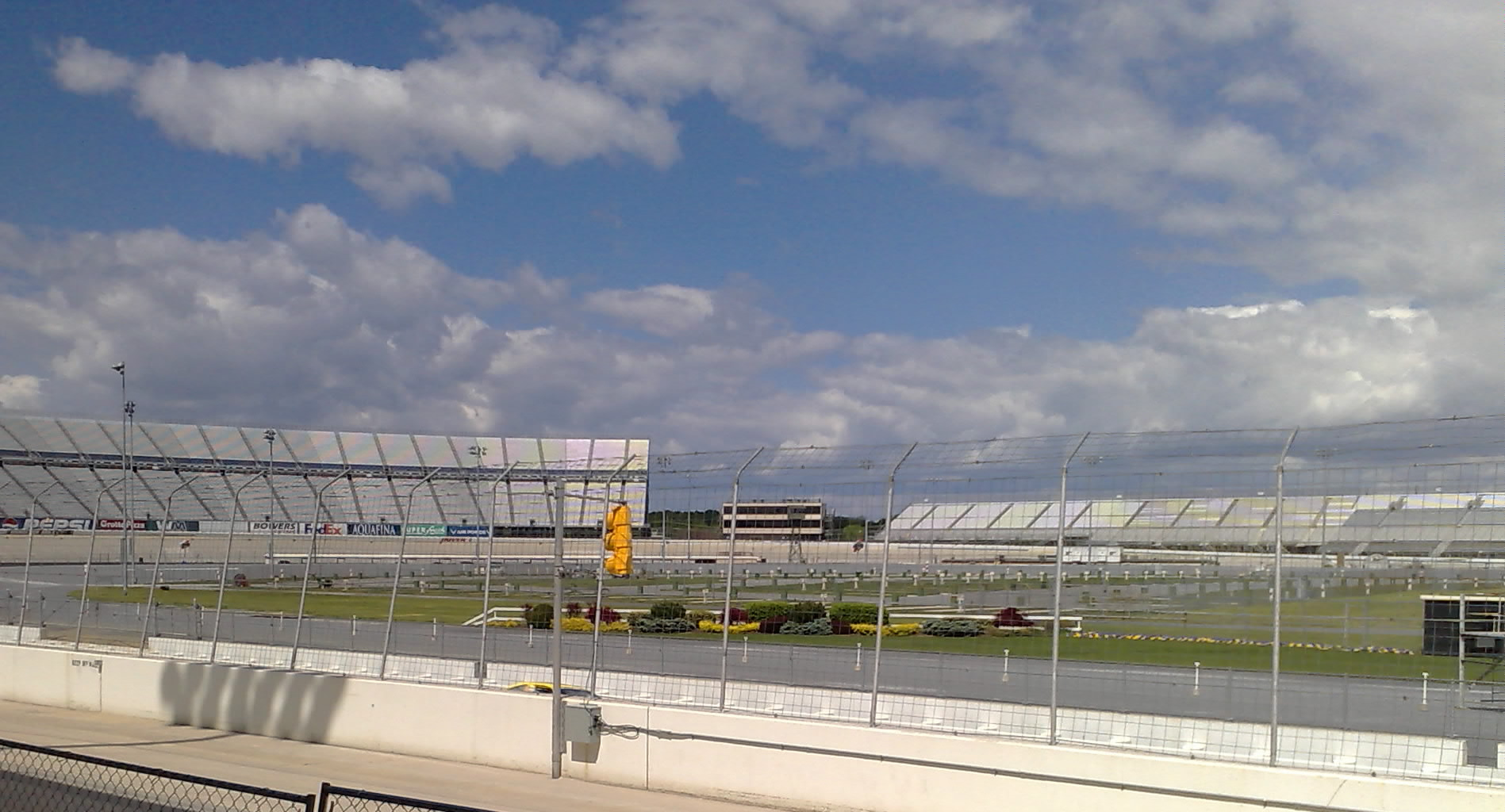
Dover International Speedway, where the race was held.

Dower Downs International Speedway, now called Dover International Speedway, is one of five short tracks to hold NASCAR races; the others are Bristol Motor Speedway, Richmond International Raceway, Martinsville Speedway, and Phoenix International Raceway. The NASCAR race makes use of the track's standard configuration, a four-turn short track oval that is 1 mile (1.6 km) long. The track's turns are banked at twenty-four degrees, and both the front stretch (the location of the finish line) and the backstretch are banked at nine degrees.

== Race report ==
The total time of the race was four hours, nineteen minutes, and fifty-three seconds. Six cautions were given for thirty-eight laps while thirty-two thousand and eight hundred fans were in attendance for the race. The average speed in the race was 115.436 miles per hour (185.776 km/h) with the pole winning speed being 136.013 miles per hour (218.892 km/h). From lap 115 to lap 227, Cale Yarborough would lead for a duration of 163 laps. He would never regain the lead after losing it to David Pearson on lap 278.

Benny Parsons defeated second place driver David Pearson by a time of 25½ seconds. Other notable racers who competed includes: Darrell Waltrip, Ricky Rudd, and Cale Yarborough (who would lose the points lead after this race). Bruce Hill finished in last place due to an engine problem on lap 2.

This race would be Neil Castles' final race in his NASCAR Cup Series career. It would also be the last race for Doc Faustina before his retirement. Total winnings for this race would be $108,140 ($597,553 when adjusted for inflation).

=== Qualifying ===
Grid	No.	Driver	Manufacturer	Owner
1	71	Dave Marcis	Dodge	Nord Krauskopf
2	21	David Pearson	Mercury	Wood Brothers
3	2	Bobby Allison	Mercury	Roger Penske
4	15	Buddy Baker	Ford	Bud Moore
5	88	Darrell Waltrip	Chevrolet	DiGard Racing
6	43	Richard Petty	Dodge	Petty Enterprises
7	72	Benny Parsons	Chevrolet	L.G. DeWitt
8	11	Cale Yarborough	Chevrolet	Junior Johnson
9	28	Donnie Allison	Chevrolet	Hoss Ellington
10	54	Lennie Pond	Chevrolet	Ronnie Elder
11	90	Dick Brooks	Ford	Junie Donlavey
12	36	Bobby Wawak	Chevrolet	John Gwinn
13	24	Cecil Gordon	Chevrolet	Cecil Gordon
14	3	Richard Childress	Chevrolet	Richard Childress
15	47	Bruce Hill	Chevrolet	Bruce Hill
16	8	Ed Negre	Dodge	Ed Negre
17	22	Ricky Rudd	Chevrolet	Al Rudd
18	67	Buddy Arrington	Dodge	Buddy Arrington
19	50	Darrell Bryant	Chevrolet	Cliff Stewart
20	40	D.K. Ulrich	Chevrolet	J.R. DeLotto

== Top 10 finishers ==
Pos	Grid	No.	Driver	Manufacturer	Laps	Laps led	Points	Time/Status
1	7	72	Benny Parsons	Chevrolet	500	176	180	4:19:53
2	2	21	David Pearson	Mercury	500	75	175	+25.5 seconds
3	1	71	Dave Marcis	Dodge	499	4	170	+1 lap
4	3	2	Bobby Allison	Mercury	497	2	165	+3 laps
5	4	15	Buddy Baker	Ford	495	0	155	+5 laps
6	6	43	Richard Petty	Dodge	492	0	150	+7 laps
7	11	93	Dick Brooks	Ford	492	0	146	+7 laps
8	10	54	Lennie Pond	Chevrolet	491	0	142	+8 laps
9	19	50	Darrell Bryant	Chevrolet	478	0	138	+12 laps
10	14	3	Richard Childress	Chevrolet	476	0	134	+14 laps

== Timeline ==
Section reference:

- Start of race: Bobby Allison had the pole position as the green flag waves into the air.
- Lap 2: Bruce Hill's engine stopped working properly on this lap.
- Lap 3: David Pearson took over the lead from Bobby Allison.
- Lap 16: Cale Yarborough took over the lead from David Pearson.
- Lap 23: Benny Parsons took over the lead from Cale Yarborough.
- Lap 34: Cale Yarborough took over the lead from Benny Parsons.
- Lap 51: Tommy Gale had a terminal crash.
- Lap 57: Dave Marcis took over the lead from Cale Yarborough.
- Lap 58: David Pearson took over the lead from Dave Marcis.
- Lap 59: Benny Parsons took over the lead from David Pearson.
- Lap 63: Cale Yarborough took over the lead from Benny Parsons.
- Lap 113: Dave Marcis took over the lead from Cale Yarborough.
- Lap 115: Cale Yarborough took over the lead from Dave Marcis.
- Lap 136: Cecil Gordon's vehicle suffered from engine problems.
- Lap 149: Transmission problems would force Donnie Allison to quit the race prematurely.
- Lap 218: Engine problems struck Ed Negre in a manner that he could not continue the race.
- Lap 247: Ricky Rudd had a terminal crash.
- Lap 250: Ignition problems ended Earl Brooks' chance of winning the race.
- Lap 271: Engine problems forced Buddy Arrington to step aside.
- Lap 278: David Pearson took over the lead from Cale Yarborough.
- Lap 316: Engine problems managed to bring Darrell Waltrip into the garage for the remainder of the race.
- Lap 320: A faulty swar bar took away Buck Baker's hopes at a respectable race finish.
- Lap 326: Dave Marcis took over the lead from David Pearson.
- Lap 327: David Pearson took over the lead from Dave Marcis.
- Lap 332: Benny Parsons took over the lead from David Pearson.
- Lap 354: David Pearson took over the lead from Benny Parsons.
- Lap 362: Benny Parsons took over the lead from David Pearson.
- Finish: Benny Parsons was officially declared the winner of the event.

== Standings after the race ==
Pos	Driver	Points	Differential
1 ▲	Benny Parsons	1836	0
2 ▼	Cale Yarborough	1812	-24
3	Richard Petty	1723	-113
4	Bobby Allison	1656	-180
5 ▲	Dave Marcis	1612	-224
6 ▼	Lennie Pond	1588	-248
7	Richard Childress	1516	-320
8 ▲	Buddy Baker	1429	-407
9 ▼	Darrell Waltrip	1384	-452
10 ▲	Frank Warren	1371	-465

Preceded by 1976 Music City USA 420	NASCAR Winston Cup Season; 1976	Succeeded by 1976 World 600
