= Joe Frasson =

Former NASCAR driver

Joseph "Joe" Frasson
- Frasson at Darlington Raceway, circa 1970s
- Born: September 3, 1935; Golden Valley, Minnesota, U.S.
- Died: November 21, 2016 (aged 81)

NASCAR Cup Series career
- 107 races run over 10 years
- Best finish: 22nd (1970)
- First race: 1969 Motor Trend 500 (Riverside)
- Last race: 1978 American 500 (Rockingham)
Wins	Top tens	Poles
0	19	0

NASCAR O'Reilly Auto Parts Series career
- 1 race run over 1 year
- Best finish: 120th (1982)
- First race: 1982 Miller Time 300 (Charlotte)
Wins	Top tens	Poles
0	0	0

Joseph "Joe" Frasson (September 3, 1935 – November 21, 2016) was an American former auto racing driver who competed in the NASCAR Winston Cup Series. Born in Golden Valley, Minnesota, his Winston Cup Series career spanned from 1969 to 1978, with four top-five and nineteen top-ten finishes. He also had an abortive attempt at participating in the Budweiser Late Model Sportsman Series in 1982.

== Personality ==
Frasson's anger management issues caused him to frequently lose his temper when he failed to qualify in NASCAR Cup Series races. His fierce and independent attitude during his NASCAR career would preclude the need for corporate sponsors and being a part of a multi-vehicle organization. Having a rather gruff appearance, he was not apologetic to NASCAR media present at the race, and he showed an element of rudeness that people in the Southern United States stereotypically pictured people from the Northern United States as being.

== Career ==
Frasson completed 30,378.3 miles or 48,889.1 kilometres of Cup Series racing with overall career earnings of $148,930 ($735,152 when adjusted for inflation). He was the runner-up for the 1970 NASCAR Rookie of the Year award to Bill Dennis. During his NASCAR career, Frasson had his best results on the short tracks with an average finish of 19th place, while on road courses he averaged a 33rd place finish. His best race finish was third place, which he achieved twice: at the 1972 Rebel 400 and the 1973 Alamo 500. He also led 25 laps in the Cup Series.

Racing eventually took a heavy burden on Frasson's finances because of his absolute devotion to being a "pure short track racer." He was friends with Marion Cox and once drove his vehicle to race; where he would move up the pack to an impressive finish. Frasson's primary racing vehicle throughout his career was a No. 18 Buick which was owned, operated, and sponsored by himself. Frasson also drove Chevrolet and Dodge vehicles as his secondary vehicles. He was believed to hire temporary crew members for the early part of the 1973 NASCAR Winston Cup Series season; particularly at the 1973 World 600. He made 14 race appearances at Talladega Superspeedway during his career.

Frasson was indirectly involved in the famous finish of the 1976 Daytona 500, in which eventual winner David Pearson made contact with his lapped car after having collided with rival Richard Petty moments earlier. Another notable moment of Frasson's racing career also took place at Daytona International Speedway. On February 17, 1979, he was involved in a multi-car accident on the third lap of a NASCAR Sportsman Series race held at the track, in which his vehicle burst into flames and was hit at high speed by the car of Delma Cowart. Frasson survived with superficial burns, but Don Williams suffered fatal injuries after crashing into the wall while avoiding Frasson's car.

After leaving the national NASCAR circuit in the early 1980's, Frasson remained active in smaller racing championships such as the NASCAR Southeast Series until at least 1998.

== Later life ==
Frasson was known to have been dissatisfied with the way NASCAR racing evolved in years following his exit from the sport. In 2010, he commented on the contemporary policing approach of the sanctioning body, criticising NASCAR for what he viewed as excessive application of fines for instances of relatively minor car-to-car contact. He admitted to preferring the days when drivers appreciated the glass of wine at the post-race ceremonies instead of their multimillion-dollar paychecks.

Frasson died on November 21, 2016, at the age of 81.
