= 1974 Dixie 500 =

Auto race held at Atlanta International Raceway in 1974

Race details
- Race 19 of 30 in the 1974 NASCAR Winston Cup Series season
- Layout of Atlanta International Speedway, used until 1996
- Date: July 28, 1974
- Official name: Dixie 500
- Location: Atlanta International Raceway, Hampton, Georgia
- Course: Permanent racing facility
- Course length: 1.522 miles (2.449 km)
- Distance: 328 laps, 499.216 mi (803.410 km)
- Weather: Temperatures of 88 °F (31 °C); wind speeds of 10.1 miles per hour (16.3 km/h)
- Average speed: 131.651 miles per hour (211.872 km/h)
- Attendance: 38,000

Pole position
Driver	Cale Yarborough	Junior Johnson & Associates

Most laps led
Driver	David Pearson	Wood Brothers
- Laps: 114

Winner
No. 43	Richard Petty	Petty Enterprises

The 1974 Dixie 500 was a NASCAR Winston Cup Series race held on July 28, 1974, at Atlanta International Raceway in Hampton, Georgia.

Souvenir programs of this event were $2 USD per copy ($13.06 when adjusted for inflation).

== Background ==
Atlanta International Raceway (now Atlanta Motor Speedway) is one of ten current intermediate track to hold NASCAR races. The layout at Atlanta International Speedway at the time was a four-turn traditional oval track that is 1.522 miles (2.449 km) long. The track's turns are banked at twenty-four degrees, while the front stretch, the location of the finish line, and the back stretch are banked at five.

== Race report ==
There were 36 drivers in this 328-lap race; Dan Daughtry was the last-place finisher due to troubles with his engine on lap 10. Cale Yarborough earned the pole position at a speed of 156.75 mph (252.26 km/h). Earl Ross, a Canadian NASCAR driver, was the only foreigner on the starting grid. Donnie Allison, Buddy Baker and Richard Petty would dominate the opening laps of this event. This would be the last time that a Winston Cup Atlanta race was run during the summer.

The average speed was 131.651 mph (211.872 km/h) for three-hour-and-forty-two-minute race. Buddy Baker, David Pearson, and Richard Petty would dominate the final laps of the race. In the end, Richard Petty went on to defeat David Pearson by exactly 21 seconds. 38,000 spectators would see other notable drivers such as Elmo Langley, J. D. McDuffie, James Hylton, Donnie Allison and Bill Champion.

Jimmy Crawford would make his final NASCAR Winston Cup Series start in this race; he finished in 31st place.

Individual winnings ranged from the winner's share of $19,350 ($126,323 when adjusted for inflation) to $875 for the last-place finisher ($5,712 when adjusted for inflation). The total prize purse was $101,295 ($661,288 when adjusted for inflation).

=== Qualifying ===
Grid	No.	Driver	Manufacturer
1	11	Cale Yarborough	'74 Chevrolet
2	43	Richard Petty	'74 Dodge
3	15	Buddy Baker	'73 Ford
4	54	Lennie Pond	'74 Chevrolet
5	88	Donnie Allison	'74 Chevrolet
6	72	Benny Parsons	'74 Chevrolet
7	90	Charlie Glotzbach	'72 Ford
8	21	David Pearson	'73 Mercury
9	52	Earl Ross	'74 Chevrolet
10	12	Bobby Allison	'74 AMC Matador
11	93	Jackie Rogers	'74 Chevrolet
12	95	Darrell Waltrip	'74 Chevrolet
13	96	Richard Childress	'73 Chevrolet
14	98	Richie Panch	'72 Chevrolet
15	28	Bobby Isaac	'74 Chevrolet
16	2	Dave Marcis	'73 Dodge
17	35	Dan Daughtry	'72 Ford
18	48	James Hylton	'74 Chevrolet
19	30	Walter Ballard	'74 Chevrolet
20	24	Cecil Gordon	'72 Chevrolet
21	14	Coo Coo Marlin	'73 Chevrolet
22	49	G.C. Spencer	'74 Dodge
23	79	Frank Warren	'74 Dodge
24	70	J. D. McDuffie	'72 Chevrolet
25	7	Dean Dalton	'74 Chevrolet

== Top 10 finishers ==
Pos	Grid	No.	Driver	Manufacturer	Laps	Laps led	Time/Status
1	2	43	Richard Petty	Dodge	328	94	3:42:31
2	8	21	David Pearson	Mercury	328	114	+21 seconds
3	3	15	Buddy Baker	Ford	327	9	+1 lap
4	12	95	Darrell Waltrip	Chevrolet	324	0	+4 laps
5	4	54	Lennie Pond	Chevrolet	319	0	+9 laps
6	16	2	Dave Marcis	Dodge	317	0	+11 laps
7	32	18	Joe Frasson	Dodge	316	0	+12 laps
8	6	72	Benny Parsons	Chevrolet	316	0	+12 laps
9	21	14	Coo Coo Marlin	Chevrolet	314	0	+14 laps
10	20	24	Cecil Gordon	Chevrolet	314	0	+14 laps

Preceded by 1973	Dixie 500 races 1974	Succeeded by 1975

Preceded by 1974 Motor State 360	Richard Petty's Career Wins; 1960-1984	Succeeded by 1974 Purlator 500
