= 1974 Southeastern 500 =

Auto race held at Bristol International Speedway in 1974

Race details
- Race 5 of 30 in the 1974 NASCAR Winston Cup Series season
- Layout of Bristol Motor Speedway
- Date: March 17, 1974
- Official name: Southeastern 500
- Location: Bristol International Speedway, Bristol, Tennessee
- Course: Permanent racing facility
- Course length: 0.533 miles (0.858 km)
- Distance: 500 laps, 266.5 mi (428.89 km)
- Weather: Cold with temperatures of 55.9 °F (13.3 °C); wind speeds of 18.1 miles per hour (29.1 km/h)
- Average speed: 64.533 miles per hour (103.856 km/h)
- Attendance: 18,000

Pole position
Driver	Donnie Allison	DiGard Motorsports

Most laps led
Driver	Cale Yarborough	Howard & Egerton Racing
- Laps: 367

Winner
No. 11	Cale Yarborough	Howard & Egerton Racing

The 1974 Southeastern 500 was a NASCAR Winston Cup Series racing event that was held on March 17, 1974, at Bristol International Speedway in Bristol, Tennessee.

Only manual transmission vehicles were allowed to participate in this race; a policy that NASCAR has retained to the present day.

== Background ==
Bristol Motor Speedway is a NASCAR short track venue located in Bristol, Tennessee. Constructed in 1960, it held its first NASCAR race on July 30, 1961. Despite its short length, Bristol is among the most popular tracks on the NASCAR schedule because of its distinct features, which include extraordinarily steep banking, an all concrete surface, two pit roads, and stadium-like seating. It has also been named one of the loudest NASCAR tracks.

== Race report ==
There were 30 American-born drivers on the grid; the distance of the race was 500 laps. Jabe Thomas was credited as the last-place finisher due to problems with his oil pan on lap 63 of the race. The first 50 laps of the race were not scored due to the fuel crisis that took place during this year. Donnie Allison, Cale Yarborough, Bobby Isaac, Benny Parsons, and Bobby Allison would be the respective leaders for certain parts of the race. After three hours and forty-two minutes of racing, Cale Yarborough defeated Bobby Isaac by one lap in front of a live audience of eighteen thousand people. Yarborough would be the only driver on the lead lap by the end of the race. With a strong second-place run with Issac at the wheel, this was the last race for car owner Banjo Matthew and his famous #27 team.

Most of the drivers in the race either used Chevrolet or Ford vehicles for their official racing vehicle; Chevrolet swept the entire top-ten for this race. The total purse of this race was $45,075 ($287,391.14 when adjusted for inflation). Donnie Allison achieved the pole position for this race by driving up to 107.785 miles per hour (173.463 km/h) during solo qualifying runs. Yarborough's average speed for the entire racing event was 64.533 miles per hour (103.856 km/h).

The model years of the vehicles ranged from 1972 to 1974; complying with the homologation policies set forth by NASCAR during this era. Engine issues and accidents were the main reasons for the DNFs found in this racing event. Joe Mihalic would have the best finish of his NASCAR Winston Cup Series career at this race.

=== Qualifying ===
Grid	No.	Driver	Manufacturer
1	88	Donnie Allison	'74 Chevrolet
2	12	Bobby Allison	'74 Chevrolet
3	11	Cale Yarborough	'74 Chevrolet
4	48	James Hylton	'74 Chevrolet
5	72	Benny Parson	'74 Chevrolet
6	27	Bobby Isaac	'74 Chevrolet
7	24	Cecil Gordon	'74 Chevrolet
8	02	L.D. Ottinger	'74 Chevrolet
9	43	Richard Petty	'74 Dodge
10	15	George Follmer	'73 Ford
11	7	Dean Dalton	'74 Chevrolet
12	60	Joe Mihalic	'74 Chevrolet
13	54	Lennie Pond	'74 Chevrolet
14	68	Alton Jones	'73 Chevrolet
15	30	Walter Ballard	'73 Chevrolet
16	96	Richard Childress	'73 Chevrolet
17	05	David Sisco	'72 Chevrolet
18	90	Richie Panch	'74 Ford
19	79	Frank Warren	'74 Dodge
20	64	Elmo Langley	'73 Ford
21	67	Buddy Arrington	'72 Plymouth
22	70	J.D. McDuffie	'72 Chevrolet
23	9	Tony Bettenhausen, Jr.	'72 Chevrolet
24	8	Ed Negre	'73 Dodge
25	75	Bobby Fleming	'72 Chevrolet
26	2	Dave Marcis	'73 Dodge
27	14	Coo Coo Marlin	'73 Chevrolet
28	10	Bill Champion	'72 Ford
29	46	Travis Tiller	'73 Dodge
30	25	Jabe Thomas	'73 Dodge

=== Top 10 finishers ===
Pos	Grid	No.	Driver	Manufacturer	Money	Laps	Laps led	Time/Status
1	3	11	Cale Yarborough	Chevrolet	$8,655	500	367	3:42:50
2	6	27	Bobby Isaac	Chevrolet	$4,030	499	2	+1 lap
3	5	72	Benny Parsons	Chevrolet	$4,905	498	6	+2 laps
4	2	12	Bobby Allison	Chevrolet	$3,355	497	73	+3 laps
5	1	88	Donnie Allison	Chevrolet	$1,980	491	2	+9 laps
6	7	24	Cecil Gordon	Chevrolet	$1,080	488	0	+12 laps
7	12	60	Joe Mihalic	Chevrolet	$1,010	485	0	+15 laps
8	4	48	James Hylton	Chevrolet	$955	471	0	+29 laps
9	14	68	Alton Jones	Chevrolet	$845	469	0	+31 laps
10	27	14	Coo Coo Marlin	Chevrolet	$605	457	0	+53 laps

== Timeline ==
Section reference:

- Laps 1-50: Not officially scored due to oil crisis.
- Lap 51: Donnie Allison started out with the lead.
- Lap 53: Cale Yarborough took over the lead from Donnie Allison.
- Lap 110: Bobby Isaac took over the lead from Cale Yarborough.
- Lap 112: Benny Parsons took over the lead from Bobby Isaac.
- Lap 118: Bobby Isaac took over the lead from Benny Parson.
- Lap 191: Cale Yarborough took over the lead from Bobby Isaac.
- Finish: Cale Yarborough was officially declared the winner.

Preceded by 1974 Carolina 500	NASCAR Winston Cup Series Season; 1974	Succeeded by 1974 Atlanta 500
