= 1985 NASCAR Winston Cup Series =

American motorsport season

Seasons
- ← 1984 1986 →

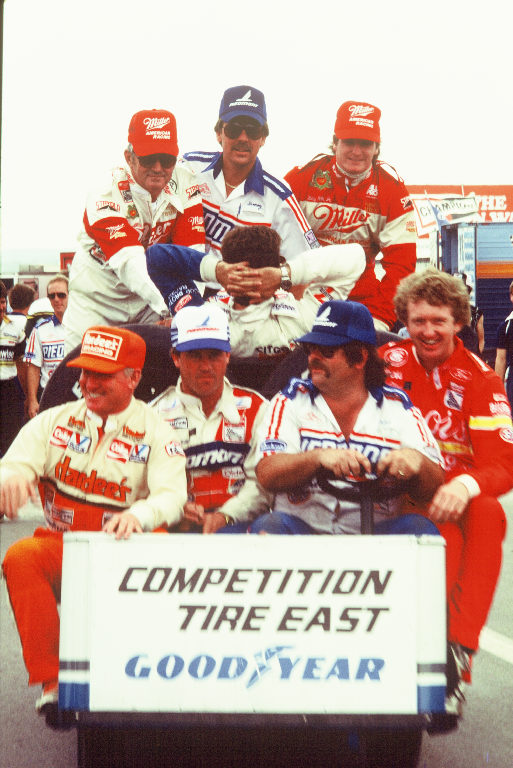
Drivers Bobby Allison (upper left), Bobby Hillin Jr. (upper right), Cale Yarborough (lower left), Terry Labonte (2nd from lower left), and Bill Elliott (lower right) in at Pocono in 1985

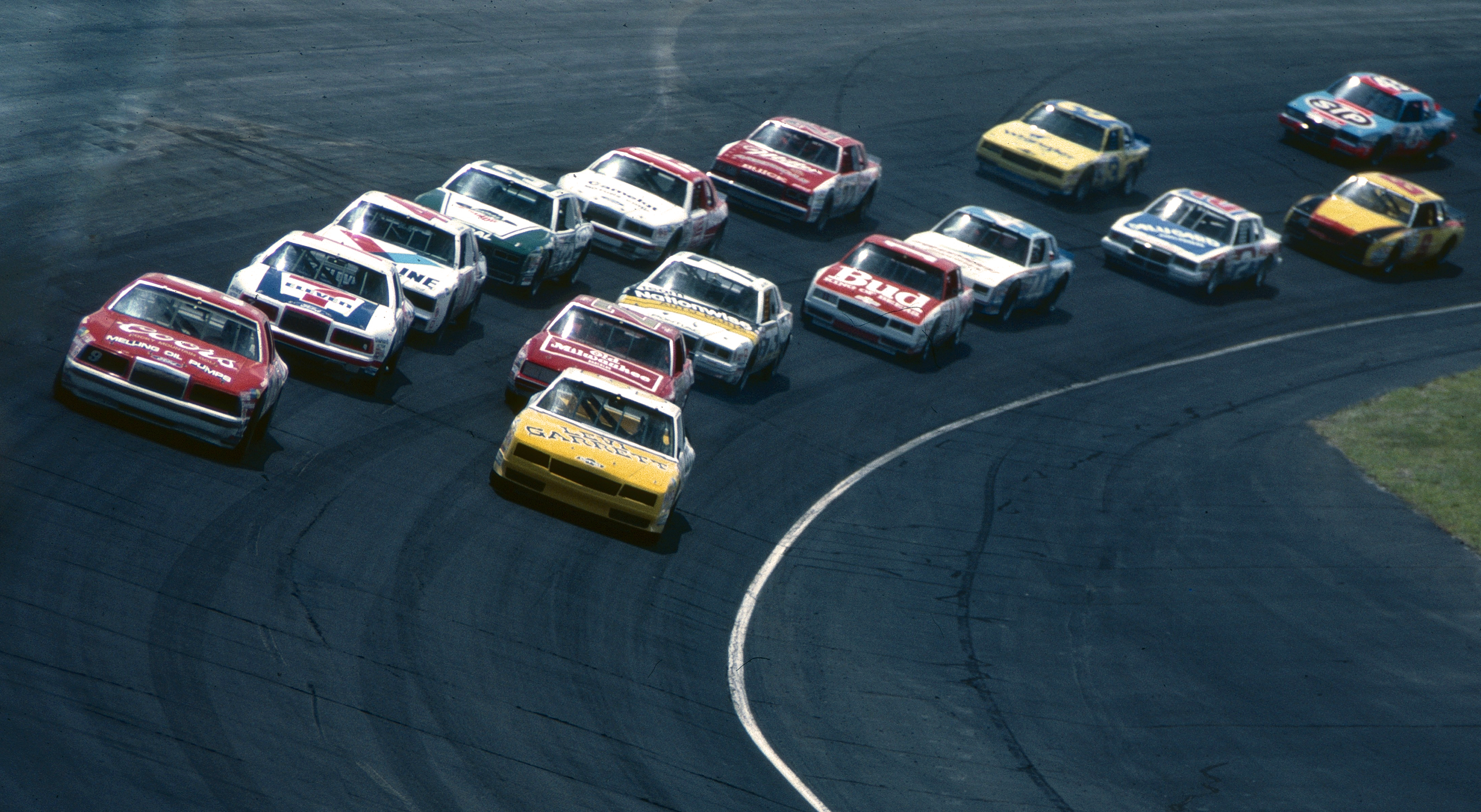
NASCAR at Dover in 1985

The 1985 NASCAR Winston Cup Series was the 37th season of professional stock car racing in the United States and the 14th modern-era Cup series season. The season began on Sunday, February 10 and ended on Sunday, November 17. Darrell Waltrip, driving for Junior Johnson, was crowned champion (for the third time in his career) at the end of the season. Bill Elliott, driving for Harry Melling, had won 11 races in 1985 (as well as the Winston Million), but lost the title by 101 points to three-time race winner Waltrip. This was the first season where all races were televised in some form.

== Teams and drivers ==
=== Complete schedule ===
Manufacturer	Team	No.	Race Driver	Crew Chief
Buick	DiGard Motorsports	22/77	Bobby Allison 15	Robin Pemberton
Buick	DiGard Motorsports	22/77	Greg Sacks 13	Robin Pemberton
Buick	Race Hill Farm Team	47	Ron Bouchard	Jake Elder
Buick	Stavola Brothers Racing	8	Bobby Hillin Jr.	
Chevrolet	Hamby Motorsports	17	Ken Ragan 6	
Chevrolet	Hamby Motorsports	17	Phil Parsons 14	
Chevrolet	Hamby Motorsports	17	Bosco Lowe 1	
Chevrolet	Hamby Motorsports	17	Lennie Pond 7	
Chevrolet	Hendrick Motorsports	5	Geoff Bodine	Harry Hyde
Chevrolet	Junior Johnson & Associates	11	Darrell Waltrip	Jeff Hammond
Chevrolet	Junior Johnson & Associates	12	Neil Bonnett	Doug Richert
Chevrolet	Mach 1 Racing	33	Harry Gant	Travis Carter
Chevrolet	Marcis Auto Racing	71	Dave Marcis	
Chevrolet	Richard Childress Racing	3	Dale Earnhardt	Kirk Shelmerdine
Ford	Bud Moore Engineering	15	Ricky Rudd	Bud Moore
Ford	Donlavey Racing	90	Ken Schrader (R)	
Ford	Langley Racing	64	Clark Dwyer	
Ford	Melling Racing	9	Bill Elliott	Ernie Elliott
Ford	Wood Brothers Racing	7	Kyle Petty	Leonard Wood
Oldsmobile	Baker-Schiff Racing	88	Buddy Baker	
Oldsmobile	Hagan Racing	44	Terry Labonte	Dale Inman
Pontiac	Blue Max Racing	27	Tim Richmond	Barry Dodson
Pontiac	Cliff Stewart Racing	2	Rusty Wallace	Darrell Bryant
Pontiac	Curb Racing	43	Richard Petty	Mike Beam
Pontiac	Means Racing	52	Jimmy Means	
Pontiac	RahMoc Enterprises	75	Lake Speed	Bob Rahilly
Chrysler 5 Dodge 1 Ford 22	Arrington Racing	67	Morgan Shepherd 1	
Chrysler 5 Dodge 1 Ford 22	Arrington Racing	67	Phil Good 1	
Chrysler 5 Dodge 1 Ford 22	Arrington Racing	67	Buddy Arrington 26	Joey Arrington 26

=== Limited schedule ===
Manufacturer	Team	No.	Race Driver	Crew Chief	Round(s)
Buick	Bahre Racing	23	Dick May		1
Buick	Booher Farms	65	Joe Booher		1
Buick	Ulrich Racing	65	D. K. Ulrich		1
Buick	Buck Baker Racing	87	Randy Baker		3
Buick	Stolarcyk Racing	87	Mike Stolarcyk		1
Buick	Cooper Racing	80	Edward Cooper		1
Buick	Edwards Racing	32	Jonathan Lee Edwards		1
Buick	Edwards Racing	40	Jonathan Lee Edwards		1
Buick	Edwards Racing	41	Jonathan Lee Edwards		1
Buick	Elliott Racing	72	Brent Elliott	Kermit Elliott	4
Buick	Kieper Racing	98	Jim Bown		1
Buick	Newsom Racing	20	Rick Newsom		4
Buick	Osborne Racing	16	Bill Osborne		2
Buick	Petris Racing	63	Dale Perry		1
Buick	U.S. Racing	50	Jim Southard		4
Chevrolet	Adcox Racing	29	Grant Adcox		2
Chevrolet	Anderson Racing	08	Craig Spetman		2
Chevrolet	Bahre Racing	23	Morgan Shepherd		1
Chevrolet	Bahre Racing	23	Jim Hull		1
Chevrolet	Bahre Racing	23	Eldon Dotson		1
Chevrolet	Ball Racing	99	Connie Saylor		6
Chevrolet	Ball Racing	99	Blair Aiken		2
Chevrolet	Beahr Racing	35	Bud Hickey		1
Chevrolet	Benfield Racing	98	Trevor Boys		6
Chevrolet	Stoke Racing	98	Ron Esau		1
Chevrolet	Kieper Racing	98	Jim Bown		1
Chevrolet	Billy Matthews Racing	09	Dick Trickle		2
Chevrolet	Bob Johnson Racing	07	Randy LaJoie		2
Chevrolet	Bobby Hawkins Racing	16	Butch Lindley		1
Chevrolet	Bobby Hawkins Racing	16	Morgan Shepherd		4
Chevrolet	Boys Racing	24	Trevor Boys		1
Chevrolet	Davis Racing	06	Joe Thurman		1
Chevrolet	Freelander Motorsports	18	Tommy Ellis		14
Chevrolet	Freelander Motorsports	18	Glen Steurer		2
Chevrolet	Hendrick Motorsports	1	Dick Brooks		1
Chevrolet	Ellington Racing	1	Charles Poalillo	Runt Pittman	1
Chevrolet	Ellington Racing	1	Davey Allison	Runt Pittman	3
Chevrolet	Ellington Racing	1	Pancho Carter	Runt Pittman	1
Chevrolet	Helen Rae Motorsports	00	Jody Ridley		1
Chevrolet	Helen Rae Motorsports	00	Ed Sanger		1
Chevrolet	Helen Rae Motorsports	00	Phil Barkdoll		2
Chevrolet	Helen Rae Motorsports	00	Morgan Shepherd		7
Chevrolet	Helen Rae Motorsports	00	Sterling Marlin		1
Chevrolet	Heveron Racing	10	Doug Heveron		1
Chevrolet	DiGard Motorsports	10	Greg Sacks		1
Chevrolet	Gerhart Racing	25	Bobby Gerhart		5
Chevrolet	Henley Gray Racing	31	Slick Johnson		1
Chevrolet	Henley Gray Racing	31	Steve Gray		1
Chevrolet	Henley Gray Racing	54	Bobby Wawak		1
Chevrolet	Goff Racing	79	Dick Skillen		2
Chevrolet	H. L. Waters Racing	0	Delma Cowart		6
Chevrolet	Hylton Racing	48	Lennie Pond		4
Chevrolet	Hylton Racing	48	Don Hume (R)		1
Chevrolet	Hylton Racing	49	Don Hume (R)		6
Chevrolet	Hylton Racing	49	James Hylton		1
Chevrolet	Hylton Racing	49	Greg Sacks		3
Chevrolet	Hylton Racing	49	Trevor Boys		13
Chevrolet	Hylton Racing	49	Lennie Pond		1
Chevrolet	Hylton Racing	49	Ron Esau		1
Chevrolet	Jackson Brothers Motorsports	55	Benny Parsons	Cliff Champion	13
Chevrolet	Jackson Brothers Motorsports	66	Phil Parsons	Cliff Champion	13
Chevrolet	Lain Motorsports	37	Satch Worley		1
Chevrolet	McCray Racing	45	Rick McCray		2
Chevrolet	Morris Racing	45	Rick Baldwin		1
Chevrolet	McDuffie Racing	70	J. D. McDuffie		7
Chevrolet	Morgan-McClure Motorsports	4	Joe Ruttman	Tony Glover	16
Chevrolet	Newsom Racing	20	Rick Newsom		5
Chevrolet	Paul Racing	53	Donny Paul		2
Chevrolet	Scott Racing	53	Bill Scott		3
Chevrolet	Scott Racing	53	Jeff Hooker		1
Chevrolet	Ragan Racing	77	Davey Allison	Marvin Ragan	2
Chevrolet	Sacks & Sons	51	Greg Sacks		4
Chevrolet	Sacks & Sons	51	Cecil Gordon		1
Chevrolet	Sadler Brothers Racing	95	Sterling Marlin		7
Chevrolet	Sadler Brothers Racing	95	Mike Alexander		4
Chevrolet	Schmitt Motorsports	73	Bill Schmitt		2
Chevrolet	Schmitt Motorsports	73	Steve Moore		1
Chevrolet	Shepherd Racing	38	Morgan Shepherd		1
Chevrolet	Sims Brothers Racing	84	Mike Alexander		7
Chevrolet	Sonntag Racing	65	Joey Sonntag		1
Chevrolet	Booher Farms	65	Joe Booher		1
Chevrolet	Stoner Racing	96	Eldon Dotson		1
Chevrolet	Terry Motorsports	32	Ruben Garcia		2
Chevrolet	Terry Motorsports	32	Tommy Houston		1
Chevrolet	U.S. Racing	6	Eddie Bierschwale (R)		27
Chevrolet	Thomas Racing	41	Glenn Jarrett		1
Chevrolet	Thomas Racing	41	Ronnie Thomas		8
Chevrolet	Williams Racing	63	Chuck Walton		1
Chevrolet	Wawak Racing	74	Bobby Wawak		6
Chevrolet	Wawak Racing	74	Rick Wilson		1
Chrysler	Good Racing	76	Phil Good		3
Chrysler	Rick Baldwin Racing	04	Rick Baldwin		1
Chrysler	MRE Racing	93	Maurice Randall		5
Chrysler	Palmer Racing	93	Norm Palmer		1
Chrysler	St. James Racing	02	St. James Davis		1
Dodge	Good Racing	76	Phil Good		1
Ford	Beahr Racing	35	Dick May		1
Ford	Beahr Racing	35	Morgan Shepherd		1
Ford	Bowman Racing	96	Jerry Bowman		5
Ford	DiGard Motorsports	10	Ken Ragan		1
Ford	Jefferson Racing	07	Derrike Cope		2
Ford	McDuffie Racing	70	J. D. McDuffie		3
Ford	McKnight Racing	83	Sumner McKnight		1
Ford	Circle Bar Racing	31	Chet Fillip		1
Ford	Pearson Racing	21	David Pearson	Leonard Wood	12
Ford	Pearson Racing	21	Rick Wilson	Leonard Wood	1
Ford	Petty Enterprises	1	Dick Brooks		3
Ford	Petty Enterprises	1	Morgan Shepherd		1
Ford	Ranier-Lundy Racing	28	Cale Yarborough	Waddell Wilson	16
Ford	Spohn Racing	05	Dean Roper		1
Ford	Spohn Racing	05	Slick Johnson		5
Ford	Spohn Racing	51	Doug Heveron		1
Ford	Spohn Racing	51	Slick Johnson		1
Ford	Stahl Racing	82	Mark Stahl		3
Ford	Terry Motorsports	32	Alan Kulwicki		2
Ford	Terry Motorsports	38	Alan Kulwicki		3
Ford	Walker Enterprises	68	Mike Potter		7
Ford	Walker Enterprises	68	Jimmy Walker		1
Ford	Walker Enterprises	68	Ed Baugess		1
Ford	Wangerin Racing	39	Blackie Wangerin		2
Oldsmobile	A. J. Foyt Enterprises	14	A. J. Foyt		7
Oldsmobile	Earle Canavan Racing	01	Earle Canavan		1
Oldsmobile	KC Racing	91	John Krebs		1
Oldsmobile	Midgley Racing	29	Scott Autrey	Dick Midgley	1
Oldsmobile	Williams Racing	78	Jim Robinson		2
Pontiac	Bahre Racing	23	Michael Waltrip		5
Pontiac	Blue Max Racing	72	Sammy Swindell		1
Pontiac	Curb Racing	42	Tom Sneva		2
Pontiac	DiGard Motorsports	10	Dick Trickle		1
Pontiac	Francis Racing	03	Glenn Francis		1
Pontiac	H. B. Bailey Racing	36	H. B. Bailey		2
Pontiac	Leonard Racing	85	Tommie Crozier		4
Pontiac	McDuffie Racing	0	Jeff McDuffie		1
Pontiac	McDuffie Racing	70	J. D. McDuffie		18
Pontiac	Mueller Brothers Racing	89	Jim Sauter		3
Pontiac	Park Racing	19	Bob Park		3
Pontiac	Riley Racing	60	Bob Riley		1
Pontiac	Sosres Racing	94	John Soares Jr.		2
Pontiac	Smith Motorsports	04	Hershel McGriff		2
Buick 8 Chevrolet 1 Ford 4	Bobby Allison Motorsports	22	Bobby Allison	Reds Kagle	13
Chevrolet 5 Buick 6	Wawak Racing	74	Bobby Wawak		8

== Schedule ==
No.	Race title	Track	Date
NC	Busch Clash	Daytona International Speedway, Daytona Beach	February 10
NC	7-Eleven Twin 125's	Daytona International Speedway, Daytona Beach	February 14
NC	Daytona 500 Consolation Race	Daytona International Speedway, Daytona Beach	February 15
1	**Daytona 500**	Daytona International Speedway, Daytona Beach	February 17
2	Miller High Life 400	Richmond Fairgrounds Raceway, Richmond	February 24
3	Carolina 500	North Carolina Motor Speedway, Rockingham	March 3
4	Coca-Cola 500	Atlanta International Raceway, Hampton	March 17
5	Valleydale 500	Bristol International Raceway, Bristol	April 6
6	TranSouth 500	Darlington Raceway, Darlington	April 14
7	Northwestern Bank 400	North Wilkesboro Speedway, North Wilkesboro	April 21
8	Sovran Bank 500	Martinsville Speedway, Ridgeway	April 28
9	**Winston 500**	Alabama International Motor Speedway, Talladega	May 5
10	Budweiser 500	Dover Downs International Speedway, Dover	May 19
NC	The Winston	Charlotte Motor Speedway, Concord	May 25
11	**Coca-Cola World 600**	Charlotte Motor Speedway, Concord	May 26
12	Budweiser 400	Riverside International Raceway, Riverside	June 2
13	Van Scoy Diamond Mine 500	Pocono International Raceway, Long Pond	June 9
14	Michigan 400	Michigan International Speedway, Brooklyn	June 16
15	Pepsi Firecracker 400	Daytona International Speedway, Daytona Beach	July 4
16	Summer 500	Pocono International Raceway, Long Pond	July 21
17	Talladega 500	Alabama International Motor Speedway, Talladega	July 28
18	Champion Spark Plug 400	Michigan International Speedway, Brooklyn	August 11
19	Busch 500	Bristol International Raceway, Bristol	August 24
20	**Southern 500**	Darlington Raceway, Darlington	September 1
21	Wrangler Sanfor-Set 400	Richmond Fairgrounds Raceway, Richmond	September 8
22	Delaware 500	Dover Downs International Speedway, Dover	September 15
23	Goody's 500	Martinsville Speedway, Ridgeway	September 22
24	Holly Farms 400	North Wilkesboro Speedway, North Wilkesboro	September 29
25	Miller High Life 500	Charlotte Motor Speedway, Concord	October 6
26	Nationwise 500	North Carolina Motor Speedway, Rockingham	October 20
27	Atlanta Journal 500	Atlanta International Raceway, Hampton	November 3
28	Winston Western 500	Riverside International Raceway, Riverside	November 17

Bold indicates the race was part of the Winston Million.

== Races ==
No.	Race	Pole position	Most laps led	Winning driver	Manufacturer
	Busch Clash	Ricky Rudd	Terry Labonte	Terry Labonte	Chevrolet
	7-Eleven 125 #1	Bill Elliott	Bill Elliott	Bill Elliott	Ford
	7-Eleven 125 #2	Cale Yarborough	Unknown	Cale Yarborough	Ford
	Daytona 500 Consolation Race	Rick Newsom	Randy LaJoie	Randy LaJoie	Chevrolet
1	Daytona 500	Bill Elliott	Bill Elliott	Bill Elliott	Ford
2	Miller High Life 400	Darrell Waltrip	Darrell Waltrip	Dale Earnhardt	Chevrolet
3	Carolina 500	Terry Labonte	Terry Labonte	Neil Bonnett	Chevrolet
4	Coca-Cola 500	Neil Bonnett	Bill Elliott	Bill Elliott	Ford
5	Valleydale 500	Harry Gant	Dale Earnhardt	Dale Earnhardt	Chevrolet
6	TranSouth 500	Bill Elliott	Bill Elliott	Bill Elliott	Ford
7	Northwestern Bank 400	Darrell Waltrip	Neil Bonnett	Neil Bonnett	Chevrolet
8	Sovran Bank 500	Darrell Waltrip	Harry Gant	Harry Gant	Chevrolet
9	Winston 500	Bill Elliott	Cale Yarborough	Bill Elliott	Ford
10	Budweiser 500	Terry Labonte	Bill Elliott	Bill Elliott	Ford
	The Winston	Terry Labonte	Harry Gant	Darrell Waltrip	Chevrolet
11	Coca-Cola World 600	Bill Elliott	Dale Earnhardt	Darrell Waltrip	Chevrolet
12	Budweiser 400	Darrell Waltrip	Terry Labonte	Terry Labonte	Chevrolet
13	Van Scoy Diamond Mine 500	Bill Elliott	Geoff Bodine	Bill Elliott	Ford
14	Miller 400	Bill Elliott	Darrell Waltrip	Bill Elliott	Ford
15	Pepsi Firecracker 400	Bill Elliott	Bill Elliott	Greg Sacks	Chevrolet
16	Summer 500	Darrell Waltrip	Neil Bonnett	Bill Elliott	Ford
17	Talladega 500	Bill Elliott	Bill Elliott	Cale Yarborough	Ford
18	Champion Spark Plug 400	Bill Elliott	Darrell Waltrip	Bill Elliott	Ford
19	Busch 500	Dale Earnhardt	Dale Earnhardt	Dale Earnhardt	Chevrolet
20	Southern 500	Bill Elliott	Dale Earnhardt	Bill Elliott	Ford
21	Wrangler Sanfor-Set 400	Geoff Bodine	Terry Labonte	Darrell Waltrip	Chevrolet
22	Delaware 500	Bill Elliott	Harry Gant	Harry Gant	Chevrolet
23	Goody's 500	Geoff Bodine	Tim Richmond	Dale Earnhardt	Chevrolet
24	Holly Farms 400	Geoff Bodine	Harry Gant	Harry Gant	Chevrolet
25	Miller High Life 500	Harry Gant	Harry Gant	Cale Yarborough	Ford
26	Nationwise 500	Terry Labonte	Cale Yarborough	Darrell Waltrip	Chevrolet
27	Atlanta Journal 500	Harry Gant	Bill Elliott	Bill Elliott	Ford
28	Winston Western 500	Terry Labonte	Terry Labonte	Ricky Rudd	Ford

=== Busch Clash ===
The Busch Clash was run on February 10 at Daytona International Speedway. Ricky Rudd drew for the pole.

Top Ten Results

1. 44 – Terry Labonte
2. 11 – Darrell Waltrip
3. 9 – Bill Elliott
4. 5 – Geoff Bodine
5. 33 – Harry Gant
6. 15 – Ricky Rudd
7. 88 – Buddy Baker
8. 2 – Rusty Wallace
9. 4 – Joe Ruttman
10. 28 – Cale Yarborough

=== 7-Eleven Twin 125's ===
The 7-Eleven Twin 125's were run on February 14 at Daytona. Bill Elliott won the pole for race 1 with a lap average speed of 205.114 mph (330.099 km/h). Cale Yarborough won the pole for race 2 with a lap average speed of 203.814 mph (328.007 km/h).

Race One Top Ten Results

1. 9 – Bill Elliott
2. 11 – Darrell Waltrip
3. 55 – Benny Parsons
4. 88 – Buddy Baker
5. 15 – Ricky Rudd
6. 1 – Dick Brooks
7. 51 – Greg Sacks
8. 47 – Ron Bouchard
9. 5 – Geoff Bodine
10. 12 – Neil Bonnett

Race Two Top Ten Results

1. 28 – Cale Yarborough
2. 21 – David Pearson
3. 7 – Kyle Petty
4. 43 – Richard Petty
5. 33 – Harry Gant
6. 66 – Phil Parsons
7. 75 – Lake Speed
8. 14 – A. J. Foyt
9. 3 – Dale Earnhardt
10. 95 – Sterling Marlin

=== Daytona 500 Consolation Race ===
For the final time to date, all 9 drivers that failed to qualify for the Daytona 500 were allowed to race in a 30 lap (75 mi (121 km)) race on February 15. Rick Newsom was on the pole.

Full Results

Finish	Grid	Car no.	Driver	Car Make	Laps	Status	Laps Led	Money
1	5	07	Randy LaJoie	Chevrolet Monte Carlo	30	0:23:46	36	$3,500
2	7	41	Glenn Jarrett	Chevrolet Monte Carlo	30	-3 seconds	0	$500
3	6	37	Satch Worley	Chevrolet Monte Carlo	30	Flagged	2	$100
4	1	20	Rick Newsom	Chevrolet Monte Carlo	30	Flagged	3	
5	2	05	Dean Roper	Ford Thunderbird	29	-1 lap	0	
6	3	06	Joe Thurman	Chevrolet Monte Carlo	29	-1 lap	0	
7	9	65	Joey Sonntag	Chevrolet Monte Carlo	28	-2 laps	0	
8	4	82	Mark Stahl	Ford Thunderbird	11	Engine	0	
9	8	19	Bob Park	Pontiac Grand Prix	2	Engine	0	

Average speed: 189.341 mi (304.715 km)
Caution flags: none

Lead changes: 2
From lap	To lap	Total laps	Driver
1	3	3	Rick Newsom
4	5	2	Satch Worley
6	30	25	Randy LaJoie

=== Daytona 500 ===
The Daytona 500, the 27th running of the event, was held on February 17, 1985, at Daytona International Speedway, in Daytona Beach, Florida. Bill Elliott won the pole with a new track record (at the time) speed of 205.114 mph (330.099 km/h), he also won his qualifying race.

Top Ten Results

1. 9 - Bill Elliott
2. 75 - Lake Speed
3. 11 - Darrell Waltrip -1 Lap
4. 88 - Buddy Baker -1 Lap
5. 15 - Ricky Rudd -1 Lap
6. 51 - Greg Sacks -1 Lap
7. 5 - Geoff Bodine -2 Laps
8. 2 - Rusty Wallace -3 Laps
9. 8 - Bobby Hillin Jr. -3 Laps
10. 12 - Neil Bonnett -5 Laps (DNF: Engine Failure)

=== Miller High Life 400 ===
The Miller High Life 400 was run on February 24 at Richmond Fairgrounds Raceway in Richmond, Virginia. Darrell Waltrip won the pole.

Top Ten Results

1. 3 – Dale Earnhardt
2. 5 – Geoff Bodine
3. 11 – Darrell Waltrip
4. 47 – Ron Bouchard
5. 33 – Harry Gant
6. 44 – Terry Labonte
7. 7 – Kyle Petty
8. 71 – Dave Marcis
9. 27 – Tim Richmond
10. 75 – Lake Speed

=== Carolina 500 ===
The Carolina 500 was run on March 3 at North Carolina Motor Speedway in Rockingham, North Carolina. Terry Labonte won the pole.

Top Ten Results

1. 12 – Neil Bonnett
2. 33 – Harry Gant
3. 44 – Terry Labonte
4. 75 – Lake Speed
5. 7 – Kyle Petty
6. 4 – Joe Ruttman
7. 28 – Cale Yarborough
8. 43 – Richard Petty
9. 2 – Rusty Wallace
10. 3 – Dale Earnhardt

=== Coca-Cola 500 ===
The Coca-Cola 500 was run on March 17 at Atlanta International Raceway in Atlanta, Georgia. For the final time in his Cup Series career Neil Bonnett won the pole.

Top Ten Results

1. 9 – Bill Elliott
2. 5 – Geoff Bodine
3. 12 – Neil Bonnett
4. 15 – Ricky Rudd
5. 22 – Bobby Allison
6. 44 – Terry Labonte
7. 47 – Ron Bouchard
8. 55 – Benny Parsons
9. 3 – Dale Earnhardt
10. 51 – Greg Sacks

=== Valleydale 500 ===
The Valleydale 500 at Bristol International Raceway in Bristol, Tennessee was originally scheduled to run on Sunday, March 31, 1985, but was postponed and ran Saturday, April 6 due to rain. Harry Gant won the pole.

Top Ten Results

1. 3 – Dale Earnhardt
2. 15 – Ricky Rudd
3. 44 – Terry Labonte -2 laps
4. 88 – Buddy Baker -2 laps
5. 2 – Rusty Wallace -3 laps
6. 7 – Kyle Petty -5 laps
7. 75 – Lake Speed -5 laps
8. 43 – Richard Petty -5 laps
9. 8 – Bobby Hillin Jr. -5 laps
10. 90 – Ken Schrader (R) -11 laps
- Earnhardt's victory came despite losing the power steering in his car during the race.

=== TranSouth 500 ===
The TranSouth 500 was run on April 14 at Darlington Raceway in Darlington, South Carolina. Bill Elliott won the pole.

Top Ten Results

1. 9 – Bill Elliott
2. 11 – Darrell Waltrip
3. 27 – Tim Richmond
4. 44 – Terry Labonte
5. 2 – Rusty Wallace
6. 12 – Neil Bonnett
7. 5 – Geoff Bodine
8. 66 – Phil Parsons
9. 75 – Lake Speed
10. 22 – Bobby Allison

=== Northwestern Bank 400 ===
The Northwestern Bank 400 was run on April 21 at North Wilkesboro Speedway in North Wilkesboro, North Carolina. Darrell Waltrip won the pole.

Top Ten Results

1. 12 – Neil Bonnett
2. 11 – Darrell Waltrip
3. 22 – Bobby Allison
4. 15 – Ricky Rudd
5. 5 – Geoff Bodine
6. 9 – Bill Elliott
7. 44 – Terry Labonte
8. 3 – Dale Earnhardt
9. 75 – Lake Speed
10. 33 – Harry Gant

=== Sovran Bank 500 ===
The Sovran Bank 500 was run on April 28 at Martinsville Speedway in Martinsville, Virginia. Darrell Waltrip won the pole.

Top Ten Results

1. 33 – Harry Gant
2. 15 – Ricky Rudd
3. 5 – Geoff Bodine
4. 22 – Bobby Allison
5. 12 – Neil Bonnett
6. 44 – Terry Labonte
7. 43 – Richard Petty
8. 75 – Lake Speed
9. 66 – Phil Parsons
10. 2 – Rusty Wallace

=== Winston 500 ===
The Winston 500 was run on May 5 at Alabama International Motor Speedway in Talladega, Alabama. Bill Elliott won the pole.

Top Ten Results

1. 9 – Bill Elliott
2. 7 – Kyle Petty
3. 28 – Cale Yarborough
4. 22 – Bobby Allison
5. 15 – Ricky Rudd
6. 88 – Buddy Baker
7. 44 – Terry Labonte
8. 71 – Dave Marcis
9. 8 – Bobby Hillin Jr.
10. 75 – Lake Speed
- Prior to this event, two-time Winston Cup champion Darrell Waltrip complained to NASCAR about how Bill Elliott was ruining the parity of the sport and he needed to be slowed down. As a result, NASCAR raised the height of the Ford vehicles by half an inch. The roof of the GM race cars was lowered by the same amount in order to improve their speed performance.
- In spite of the last minute rule changes, Bill Elliott won the race but he was forced to make up two laps under green during the race from having to pit due to a broken oil fitting. With the victory, Elliott claimed the second leg of the Winston Million.
- Fords also claimed 2nd & 3rd with Kyle Petty beating Cale Yarborough in a photo finish for 2nd.

=== Budweiser 500 ===
The Budweiser 500 was run on May 19 at Dover Downs International Speedway in Dover, Delaware. Terry Labonte won the pole.

Top Ten Results

1. 9 – Bill Elliott
2. 33 – Harry Gant
3. 7 – Kyle Petty
4. 15 – Ricky Rudd
5. 11 – Darrell Waltrip
6. 27 – Tim Richmond
7. 43 – Richard Petty
8. 75 – Neil Bonnett
9. 71 – Dave Marcis
10. 90 – Ken Schrader (R)
- This would mark the first time since 1971 (when he occasionally drove Dodge Chargers) where independent driver J.D. McDuffie; who finished 31st, drove a vehicle other than a General Motors product, as he made the first of three appearances (along with the spring race at Pocono and a one-off with Bahre Racing at the Delaware 500 at Dover) driving a Ford. Unfortunately he finished 31st (of 32 cars) after completing 115 laps due to a broken valve in the engine.

=== The Winston ===
The inaugural Winston was run on May 25 at Charlotte Motor Speedway in Concord, North Carolina. Terry Labonte won the pole due to being the defending NASCAR Winston Cup Champion.

Top Six Results

1. 11 - Darrell Waltrip
2. 33 - Harry Gant
3. 44 - Terry Labonte
4. 28 - Cale Yarborough
5. 27 - Tim Richmond
6. 22 - Bobby Allison
- After Darrell Waltrip took the checkered flag his engine expired in spectacular fashion which potentially jeopardized him from being able to compete in the next days Coca-Cola 600.

=== Coca-Cola World 600 ===
The Coca-Cola World 600 was run on May 26 at Charlotte. Bill Elliott won the pole.

Top Ten Results

1. 11 – Darrell Waltrip
2. 33 – Harry Gant
3. 22 – Bobby Allison
4. 3 – Dale Earnhardt
5. 44 – Terry Labonte
6. 75 – Lake Speed
7. 4 – Joe Ruttman
8. 2 – Rusty Wallace
9. 27 – Tim Richmond
10. 1 – Dick Brooks
- Bill Elliott had a chance to clinch the first Winston Million, and a then NASCAR record crowd of 155,000 spectators arrived to cheer him on. After considerable pre-race hype, Elliott led 81 laps, but fell short, however, as mechanical problems plagued much of his day. Elliott would finish in 18th, running 21 laps down to the winner. Elliott would have one more chance to claim the Million at Darlington in the Southern 500.
- Darrell Waltrip gambled on fuel, stretching his tank over the final 110 laps to secure the victory. Waltrip (who won The Winston a day earlier) nearly missed the race after a car/engine swap controversy with NASCAR Director of Competition Dick Beatty.
- This was the first NASCAR Winston Cup start for Michael Waltrip. He would finish 28th due to a transmission failure.
- Final start for 10th-place finisher Dick Brooks.

=== Budweiser 400 ===
The Budweiser 400 was run on June 2 at Riverside International Raceway in Riverside, California. Darrell Waltrip won the pole.

Top Ten Results

1. 44 – Terry Labonte
2. 33 – Harry Gant
3. 22 – Bobby Allison
4. 15 – Ricky Rudd
5. 7 – Kyle Petty
6. 9 – Bill Elliott
7. 43 – Richard Petty
8. 11 – Darrell Waltrip
9. 27 – Tim Richmond
10. 90 – Ken Schrader (R)

=== Van Scoy Diamond Mine 500 ===
The Van Scoy Diamond Mine 500 was run on June 9 at Pocono Raceway in Long Pond, Pennsylvania. Bill Elliott won the pole.

Top Ten Results

1. 9 – Bill Elliott
2. 33 – Harry Gant
3. 11 – Darrell Waltrip
4. 5 – Geoff Bodine
5. 12 – Neil Bonnett
6. 55 – Benny Parsons
7. 15 – Ricky Rudd
8. 88 – Buddy Baker
9. 22 – Bobby Allison
10. 27 – Tim Richmond

=== Miller 400 ===
The Miller 400 was run on June 16 at Michigan International Speedway in Brooklyn, Michigan. Bill Elliott won the pole.

Top Ten Results

1. 9 – Bill Elliott
2. 11 – Darrell Waltrip
3. 28 – Cale Yarborough
4. 27 – Tim Richmond
5. 3 – Dale Earnhardt
6. 22 – Bobby Allison
7. 15 – Ricky Rudd
8. 12 – Neil Bonnett
9. 71 – Dave Marcis
10. 55 – Benny Parsons

=== Pepsi Firecracker 400 ===
The Pepsi Firecracker 400 was run on July 4 at Daytona International Speedway in Daytona Beach, Florida. Bill Elliott won the pole.

Top Ten Results

1. 10 – Greg Sacks
2. 9 – Bill Elliott
3. 11 – Darrell Waltrip
4. 47 – Ron Bouchard
5. 7 – Kyle Petty
6. 88 – Buddy Baker
7. 15 – Ricky Rudd
8. 44 – Terry Labonte
9. 3 – Dale Earnhardt
10. 21 – David Pearson
- The race was won by Greg Sacks, who was driving as a Research & Development driver for DiGard Motorsports. His win caused Bobby Allison to leave the team.
- This would be Sacks’ lone career win in Winston Cup competition.

=== Summer 500 ===
The Summer 500 was run on July 21 at Pocono Raceway in Long Pond, Pennsylvania. Darrell Waltrip won the pole.

Top Ten Results

1. 9 – Bill Elliott
2. 12 – Neil Bonnett
3. 11 – Darrell Waltrip
4. 5 – Geoff Bodine
5. 33 – Harry Gant
6. 55 – Benny Parsons
7. 7 – Kyle Petty
8. 66 – Phil Parsons
9. 47 – Ron Bouchard
10. 88 – Buddy Baker
- Bill Elliott completes his 1st of 4 track sweeps of 1985.
- Bobby Allison would be racing for his own team with Miller sponsorship for the remainder of the 1985 season. He would lead 2 laps and finish 2 laps down to the winner in 12th place.

=== Talladega 500 ===
The Talladega 500 was run on July 28 at Alabama International Motor Speedway in Talladega, Alabama. Bill Elliott won the pole.

Top Ten Results

1. 28 – Cale Yarborough
2. 12 – Neil Bonnett
3. 47 – Ron Bouchard
4. 9 – Bill Elliott
5. 14 – A. J. Foyt
6. 43 – Richard Petty
7. 33 – Harry Gant
8. 75 – Lake Speed
9. 11 – Darrell Waltrip
10. 1 – Davey Allison*
- This race was Davey Allison's Winston Cup debut.

=== Champion Spark Plug 400 ===
The Champion Spark Plug 400 was run on August 11 at Michigan International Speedway in Brooklyn, Michigan. Bill Elliott won the pole.

Top Ten Results

1. 9 – Bill Elliott
2. 11 – Darrell Waltrip
3. 33 – Harry Gant
4. 7 – Kyle Petty
5. 55 – Benny Parsons
6. 66 – Phil Parsons
7. 2 – Rusty Wallace
8. 10 – Dick Trickle
9. 44 – Terry Labonte
10. 67 – Buddy Arrington
- Bill Elliott completes his 2nd of 4 track sweeps of 1985.

=== Busch 500 ===
The Busch 500 was run on August 24 at Bristol International Raceway in Bristol, Tennessee. Dale Earnhardt won the pole.

Top Ten Results

1. 3 – Dale Earnhardt
2. 27 – Tim Richmond
3. 12 – Neil Bonnett
4. 11 – Darrell Waltrip
5. 9 – Bill Elliott
6. 33 – Harry Gant
7. 47 – Ron Bouchard
8. 43 – Richard Petty
9. 15 – Ricky Rudd
10. 75 – Lake Speed
- Dale Earnhardt would be the 2nd and final driver to do a track sweep in 1985 by sweeping both Bristol races.

=== Southern 500 ===
The Southern 500 was run on September 1 at Darlington Raceway in Darlington, South Carolina. Bill Elliott won the pole.

Top Ten Results

1. 9 – Bill Elliott
2. 28 – Cale Yarborough
3. 5 – Geoff Bodine
4. 12 – Neil Bonnett -1 Lap
5. 47 – Ron Bouchard -1 Lap
6. 15 – Ricky Rudd -1 Lap
7. 44 – Terry Labonte -2 Laps
8. 55 – Benny Parsons -2 Laps
9. 4 – Joe Ruttman -3 Laps
10. 7 – Kyle Petty -3 Laps
- Bill Elliott won the Winston Million with the race victory.
- With this victory Elliott had a 206-point lead in the standings with 8 races left in the season.
- Elliott also completes the Darlington sweep for his 3rd of 4 track sweeps of 1985.

=== Wrangler Sanfor-Set 400 ===
The Wrangler Sanfor-Set 400 was run on September 8 at Richmond Fairgrounds Raceway in Richmond, Virginia. Geoff Bodine won the pole.

Top Ten Results

1. 11 – Darrell Waltrip
2. 44 – Terry Labonte
3. 43 – Richard Petty
4. 3 – Dale Earnhardt
5. 15 – Ricky Rudd
6. 33 – Harry Gant
7. 5 – Geoff Bodine
8. 7 – Kyle Petty
9. 12 – Neil Bonnett
10. 18 – Tommy Ellis
- This race marked the Winston Cup Series debut of Alan Kulwicki, driving Bill Terry's #32 Ford. Kulwicki would finish 19th, 8 laps down.
- By Elliott finishing 12th in this race, Darrell Waltrip gained 53 points on Elliott.

=== Delaware 500 ===
The Delaware 500 was run on September 15 at Dover Downs International Speedway in Dover, Delaware. Bill Elliott won the pole.

Top Ten Results

1. 33 – Harry Gant
2. 11 – Darrell Waltrip
3. 15 – Ricky Rudd
4. 22 – Bobby Allison
5. 12 – Neil Bonnett
6. 27 – Tim Richmond
7. 3 – Dale Earnhardt
8. 47 – Ron Bouchard
9. 43 – Richard Petty
10. 75 – Lake Speed
- Elliott had a disastrous race finishing in 20th place 70 laps down. Waltrip gained 67 points, Elliott now only led by 86 points.

=== Goody's 500 ===
The Goody's 500 was run on September 22 at Martinsville Speedway in Martinsville, Virginia. Geoff Bodine won the pole.

Top Ten Results

1. 3 – Dale Earnhardt
2. 11 – Darrell Waltrip
3. 33 – Harry Gant
4. 15 – Ricky Rudd
5. 7 – Kyle Petty
6. 47 – Ron Bouchard
7. 27 – Tim Richmond
8. 8 – Bobby Hillin Jr.
9. 12 – Neil Bonnett
10. 22 – Bobby Allison
- Elliott had another disastrous race finishing in 17th place 33 laps down. Waltrip continued to chip away at Elliotts lead gaining 63 points, Elliott now only led by 23 points.

=== Holly Farms 400 ===
The Holly Farms 400 was run on September 29 at North Wilkesboro Speedway in North Wilkesboro, North Carolina. Geoff Bodine won the pole.

Top Ten Results

1. 33 – Harry Gant
2. 5 – Geoff Bodine
3. 44 – Terry Labonte
4. 3 – Dale Earnhardt
5. 15 – Ricky Rudd
6. 47 – Ron Bouchard
7. 27 – Tim Richmond
8. 43 – Richard Petty
9. 71 – Dave Marcis
10. 12 – Neil Bonnett
- By virtue of Elliott being the second car out of the race finishing in 30th place (out of 31 starters) and Waltrip managing to finish in 14th even with car issues 7 laps down, Waltrip erased a 206-point deficit from Darlington and overtook Elliott in the standings. Waltrip now led Elliott by 30 points.
- Following the race Harry Gant would enter a dry spell and not win a Cup Series race again until the 1989 spring Darlington race.

=== Miller High Life 500 ===
The Miller High Life 500 was run on October 6 at Charlotte Motor Speedway in Concord, North Carolina. Harry Gant won the pole.

Top Ten Results

1. 28 – Cale Yarborough
2. 9 – Bill Elliott
3. 5 – Geoff Bodine
4. 11 – Darrell Waltrip
5. 4 – Joe Ruttman
6. 27 – Tim Richmond
7. 16 – Morgan Shepherd
8. 88 – Buddy Baker
9. 8 – Bobby Hillin Jr.
10. 43 – Richard Petty
- Cale Yarborough's win would be his 83rd and the final one of his career before retiring after the 1988 season.
- Elliott and Waltrip both led laps and by Elliott finishing in 2nd he sliced 10 points off Waltrips lead with just 20 points separating the two with three races remaining.

=== Nationwise 500 ===
The Nationwise 500 was run on October 20 at a freshly repaved North Carolina Motor Speedway in Rockingham, North Carolina. Terry Labonte won the pole.

Top Ten Results

1. 11 – Darrell Waltrip
2. 47 – Ron Bouchard
3. 33 – Harry Gant
4. 9 – Bill Elliott
5. 5 – Geoff Bodine
6. 27 – Tim Richmond
7. 15 – Ricky Rudd
8. 3 – Dale Earnhardt
9. 2 – Rusty Wallace
10. 77 – Greg Sacks
- Elliott finishing three spots down in 4th lost ground to Waltrip by 15 points due to Waltrip winning. Waltrip now led by 35 points, with just Atlanta and Riverside left to settle the Championship.

=== Atlanta Journal 500 ===
The Atlanta Journal 500 was run on November 3 at Atlanta International Raceway in Hampton, Georgia. Harry Gant won the pole.

Top Ten Results

1. 9 – Bill Elliott
2. 28 – Cale Yarborough
3. 11 – Darrell Waltrip
4. 3 – Dale Earnhardt
5. 16 – Morgan Shepherd
6. 44 – Terry Labonte
7. 75 – Lake Speed
8. 33 – Harry Gant
9. 77 – Greg Sacks
10. 43 – Richard Petty
- The race began under the green and yellow flags (starting under caution) due to an earlier rainstorm that drenched the track with the green flag displayed after the completion of lap 6.
- 11th and final win of the season for Bill Elliott.
- With this win, and as of 2026, Bill Elliott is the only driver in NASCAR history to pull off the season sweep at 4 different tracks in one season. Along with the season sweep at Atlanta, he swept Pocono, Michigan, and Darlington. In 2004 however, Jimmie Johnson pulled off the season sweep at 3 different tracks, coming close to tying Bill Elliott's record. The tracks Johnson pulled off the season sweep are Pocono, Charlotte, and Darlington.
- With Elliott getting the bonus points for leading the most laps, Waltrip lost 15 points on his lead. Elliott now had a 20-point deficit going into the season finale at Riverside where he picked up his first Cup victory in 1983, while Waltrip had five wins at the road course. If Elliott won at Riverside then all Waltrip would have to do to win the title would be to finish no lower than seventh if he did not lead a lap. If DW led a lap then he could finish no lower than eighth to win the title. If he led the most laps then he could finish no lower than ninth.
- Morgan Shepherd scored his only top five finish of 1985 driving for David Pearson's team.
- Sprint car ace Sammy Swindell starts his first of two career Cup races. He finished 30th after a crash, he completed 242 of 328 laps.

=== Winston Western 500 ===
The Winston Western 500 was run on November 17 at Riverside International Raceway in Riverside, California. Terry Labonte won the pole.

Top Ten Results

1. 15 – Ricky Rudd
2. 44 – Terry Labonte
3. 75 – Neil Bonnett
4. 33 – Harry Gant
5. 3 – Dale Earnhardt
6. 5 – Geoff Bodine
7. 11 – Darrell Waltrip
8. 43 – Richard Petty
9. 75 – Lake Speed
10. 47 – Ron Bouchard
- After winning the previous race, which was at Atlanta, Bill Elliott came into this race 2nd in points, only 20 points behind Darrell Waltrip, giving him a shot to rebound for the championship after a string of poor finishes in 4 of the last 5 races. During this race however, Elliott would suffer early transmission problems, and it would cost him the championship. He finished the race in 31st. Waltrip clinched the title once he completed 99 laps of the race, he then finished in 7th, gaining 81 points on Elliott. Darrell Waltrip won his 3rd and final Winston Cup title, having won only three races to Bill Elliott's eleven. Elliott would officially lose the championship by 101 points. This would be the 1st time in Bob Latford's Winston Cup points system that a driver winning 10 or more races in a season failed to win the championship due to poor finishes and lack of consistency in the final stretch of the season.
- This was the final race for Richard Petty driving for Mike Curb. Richard would take his number 43 with STP sponsorship home to Petty Enterprises for 1986.
- This was the final race for Rusty Wallace driving for Cliff Stewart Racing. Rusty's season of misery concluded with a 36th-place finish due to engine failure completing 70 of 119 laps. This was Rusty's 12th DNF of the season, 10 of them were due to engine failures.

== Full Drivers' Championship ==
(key) Bold – Pole position awarded by time. Italics – Pole position set by owner's points. * – Most laps led.

Pos	Driver	DAY	RCH	CAR	ATL	BRI	DAR	NWS	MAR	TAL	DOV	CLT	RIV	POC	MCH	DAY	POC	TAL	MCH	BRI	DAR	RCH	DOV	MAR	NWS	CLT	CAR	ATL	RIV	Pts
1	Darrell Waltrip	3	**3***	18	16	23	2	**2**	**23**	24	5	1	**8**	3	2*	3	**3**	9	2*	4	17	1	2	2	14	4	1	3	7	4292
2	Bill Elliott	**1***	22	29	1*	11	**1***	6	13	**1**	1*	**18**	6	**1**	1	**2***	1	**4***	**1***	5	**1**	12	**20**	17	30	2	4	1*	31	4191
3	Harry Gant	26	5	2	24	**20**	14	10	1*	38	2	2	2	2	16	24	5	7	3	6	21	6	1*	3	1*	**24***	3	**8**	4	4033
4	Neil Bonnett	10	23	1	**3**	19	6	1*	5	26	8	15	27	5	8	12	2*	2	11	3	4	9	5	9	10	42	15	12	3	3902
5	Geoff Bodine	7	2	12	2	18	7	5	3	11	11	16	22	4*	11	14	4	23	23	25	3	**7**	25	**24**	**2**	3	5	11	6	3862
6	Ricky Rudd	5	25	32	4	2	25	4	2	5	4	13	4	7	7	7	14	18	31	9	6	5	3	4	5	15	7	31	1	3857
7	Terry Labonte	25	6	**3***	6	3	4	7	6	7	**16**	5	1*	28	22	8	26	39	9	29	7	2	24	27	3	33	**12**	6	**2***	3683
8	Dale Earnhardt	32	1	10	9	1*	24	8	25	21	25	4*	40	39	5	9	39	24	22	**1***	19*	4	7	1	4	20	8	4	5	3561
9	Kyle Petty	37	7	5	11	6	12	12	11	2	3	14	5	14	12	5	7	25	4	16	10	8	15	5	28	22	31	29	27	3528
10	Lake Speed	2	10	4	40	7	9	9	8	10	24	6	25	12	14	34	11	8	16	10	16	11	10	11	12	12	29	7	9	3507
11	Tim Richmond	35	9	11	30	30	3	11	21	16	6	9	9	10	4	28	30	13	40	2	11	14	6	7*	7	6	6	17	37	3413
12	Bobby Allison	33	16	31	5	13	10	3	4	4	13	3	3	9	6	18	12	27	36	22	30	28	4	10	31	14	38	26	17	3312
13	Ron Bouchard	38	4	33	7	17	16	13	28	28	20	29	32	29	13	4	9	3	38	7	5	18	8	6	6	26	2	16	10	3267
14	Richard Petty	34	26	8	13	8	33	21	7	27	7	26	7	33	30	29	27	6	37	8	12	3	9	22	8	10	33	10	8	3140
15	Bobby Hillin Jr.	9	11	24	12	9	20	19	18	9	12	12	17	18	28	15	29	38	26	24	13	21	23	8	17	9	25	19	13	3091
16	Ken Schrader **(R)**	11	14	40	17	10	13	14	16	20	10	38	10	15	34	21	15	11	20	19	14	15	16	26	15	25	19	15	23	3024
17	Buddy Baker	4	29	25	39	4	27	30	12	6	22	37	35	8	15	6	10	14	14	11	15	16	35	31	29	8	11	13	35	2986
18	Dave Marcis	24	8	26	37	24	31	16	26	8	9	11	12	27	9	23	38	26	12	23	23	17	19	23	9	34	14	28	18	2871
19	Rusty Wallace	8	27	9	27	5	5	22	10	37	18	8	24	13	26	41	33	17	7	12	38	13	31	25	25	30	9	21	36	2867
20	Buddy Arrington			16	18	25	17	20	15	14	23	22	31	19	23	16	18	16	10	15	18	22	11	21	23	17	16	20	22	2780
21	Phil Parsons	29	15	19	41	28	8	15	9	34	29	33	33	11	19	27	8	31	6	21	39	27	12	20	13	27	13	14	33	2740
22	Clark Dwyer	18	18	37	20	14	26	18	17	23	28	23	16	20	25	25	16	20	34	18	26	24	30	19	18	16	24	40	28	2641
23	Jimmy Means	14	21	30	28	12	15	17	14	12	30	32	37	22	35	32	23	42	15	27	27	23	13	13	21	38	18	41	20	2548
24	Eddie Bierschwale **(R)**	DNQ		23	15	15	19	29	20	19	32	19	18	34	29	31	17	34	21	20	32	29	27	18	19	21	17	24	32	2396
25	Greg Sacks	6		13	10					Wth		35	36	16		1	34	15	33	28	35	20	29	14	16	11	10	9	21	1944
26	Cale Yarborough	36		7	22		30			3*		40		24	3	36	31	1	32		2					1	28*	2		1861
27	J. D. McDuffie	DNQ	20	28	23	27	39	24	24	15	31	39	42	25	31	20	40	28	29	DNQ	DNQ	26	28	15	DNQ		26	27	25	1853
28	Trevor Boys	27	24	39			29			39		41			24	26	20	32	30	17	31		34	12	22	23	20	37	40	1461
29	Benny Parsons	31			8		32			29		42		6	10	11	6	36	5		8					41		33		1427
30	Joe Ruttman	17		6	26	29	11			30		7		35		35		33		13	9		33			5	40	32		1410
31	Morgan Shepherd	15		38			18		27	13		25				39			35		37	30	22	29	27	7	39	5		1406
32	Bobby Wawak	13		27	DNQ		34			32		DNQ		23	27	37	25	21	27	DNQ	DNQ		17	16	20		34	DNQ		1226
33	Lennie Pond	19	13	14	31							30		17	18	19	13	19				25				39				1107
34	Tommy Ellis											20			21	17	36	30		30	33	10	26	30	11	40	30	36		1100
35	Mike Alexander	12			34		23		29	31		24				13			13	26					26	18				1046
36	David Pearson	28			29		28			36		27			17	10	35	35	39		40					37				879
37	Sterling Marlin	16			25	22				25		34				33		12								29				645
38	Don Hume **(R)**				19	16	21	23	19	33							37													637
39	Ronnie Thomas		12	34		21			30	DNQ				40		DNQ			19	14										631
40	Alan Kulwicki																					19	21			13	27	22		509
41	Rick Newsom	DNQ	28	36	DNQ					DNQ	21			38			21				DNQ		32							450
42	Mike Potter			17		26				DNQ		DNQ		21			DNQ			31	28						22			443
43	Jerry Bowman										19			37			22						14				35			434
44	Bobby Gerhart							27						31			24		25						24					422
45	A. J. Foyt	30			36											30		5			25					32		38		410
46	Phil Good		17			QL					17			30									18		DNQ					406
47	Ken Ragan	21			33		37			QL									17		20	DNQ				28		34		356
48	Slick Johnson	20		15	21		36			DNQ		17									29							QL		343
49	Connie Saylor						35			22		DNQ				40		41			DNQ							35		296
50	Jim Sauter	23										31			20													DNQ		267
51	Glen Steurer												11																11	260
52	Jim Robinson												13															DNQ	12	251
53	Dick Brooks	22		20	38							10																		249
54	Tommie Crozier							DNQ			15				33					DNQ			37				DNQ			234
55	Derrike Cope												15																19	224
56	Ruben Garcia												23																14	215
57	Michael Waltrip											28							18		24					31		39		207
58	Dick Trickle											36							8							36				197
59	Jim Bown												28																16	194
60	Bill Osborne												21																24	191
61	Bill Schmitt												34																15	179
62	John Soares Jr.												19																30	179
63	Brent Elliott							28	22															28	DNQ					176
64	Rick Baldwin											DNQ							28									23		173
65	Joe Booher																28		24											170
66	Hershel McGriff												29																26	161
67	Maurice Randall			35				DNQ	DNQ						37								39		DNQ		DNQ			156
68	Phil Barkdoll									35								22												155
69	Jonathan Lee Edwards			21								DNQ									DNQ				DNQ		36			155
70	Davey Allison	DNQ			DNQ													10								19		42		143
71	Grant Adcox															22		40												140
72	Blair Aiken												38																29	125
73	Sumner McKnight												14																	121
74	H. B. Bailey				35							DNQ									34									119
75	Rick Wilson																	29										18		109
76	Dick Skillen	DNQ								18		DNQ				DNQ		DNQ												109
77	Glenn Francis												20																	103
78	Mark Stahl	DNQ								DNQ		21																		100
79	Eldon Dotson						38			DNQ						38		DNQ												95
80	Delma Cowart	40			DNQ					DNQ		DNQ				DNQ		37												98
81	Chet Fillip																											25		88
82	John Krebs												26																	85
83	Ed Sanger							26																						85
84	Jimmy Walker			DNQ							27																			82
85	Dale Perry												30																	73
86	Sammy Swindell																											30		73
87	Jim Hull														32															67
88	Mike Stolarcyk																32													67
89	Scott Autrey																												34	61
90	Donny Paul	DNQ																								35				58
91	Earle Canavan																						36							55
92	Edward Cooper														36															55
93	Tommy Houston																				36									55
94	Craig Spetman	DNQ								DNQ																	37			52
95	Bud Hickey																												38	49
96	Chuck Walton																						38							49
97	Doug Heveron	39															19											DNQ		46
98	Norm Palmer												39																	46
99	Rick McCray												41																39	46
100	Ron Esau																											DNQ	41	40
101	Dick May						22	25																						
102	Randy LaJoie	DNQ			14																									
103	Bob Riley										14																			
104	Bosco Lowe									17																DNQ				
105	Butch Lindley		19																											
106	Randy Baker															DNQ									DNQ		21			
107	Pancho Carter																				22									
108	Jim Southard			22	DNQ							DNQ																DNQ		
109	Jeff McDuffie																										23			
110	Steve Gray													26			DNQ													
111	James Hylton										26																			
112	Cecil Gordon		30																											
113	Bill Scott				DNQ									32			DNQ													
114	Tom Sneva	DNQ			32																									
115	D. K. Ulrich																										32			
116	Charles Poalillo													36																
117	Jeff Hooker						40																							
118	Jody Ridley	DNQ																												
119	Dean Roper	DNQ																												
120	Joe Thurman	DNQ																												
121	Satch Worley	DNQ																												
122	Glenn Jarrett	DNQ																												
123	Bob Park	DNQ			DNQ												DNQ													
124	Joey Sonntag	DNQ														DNQ														
125	Jim Hall				DNQ																									
126	Ed Baugess							DNQ			DNQ																			
127	Blackie Wangerin									DNQ																		DNQ		
128	George Wiltshire										DNQ			DNQ			DNQ													
129	John Haver											DNQ																DNQ		
130	St. James Davis												DNQ																	
131	Pat Mintey												DNQ																	
132	Jerry Holden															DNQ											DNQ	DNQ		
133	Ferrel Harris																				DNQ									
134	Mike Tilley																								DNQ					
135	Bryan Baker																								DNQ					
136	Elton Sawyer																									DNQ				
137	Glenn Sears																									DNQ				
138	Kirk Bryant																									DNQ				
139	Jon Fontana																										DNQ			
140	Johnny Coy Jr.																										DNQ			
141	Gary Fedewa																										DNQ			
142	Gary Sowell																										DNQ			
143	Buddie Boys																										DNQ	DNQ		
Pos	Driver	DAY	RCH	CAR	ATL	BRI	DAR	NWS	MAR	TAL	DOV	CLT	RIV	POC	MCH	DAY	POC	TAL	MCH	BRI	DAR	RCH	DOV	MAR	NWS	CLT	CAR	ATL	RIV	Pts

== Rookie of the year ==
Ken Schrader won the 1985 NASCAR Winston Cup Series rookie of the year. He beat out both Eddie Bierschwale (who failed to qualify for the Daytona 500 and skipped the next race) and Don Hume (who only competed in 7 races) for the honors.

== See also ==
- 1985 NASCAR Busch Series
- 1985 NASCAR Winston West Series
