= ARCA races at Daytona =

ARCA Menards Series races at Daytona International Speedway

ARCA Menards Series at Daytona

ARCA Menards Series
- Venue: Daytona International Speedway
- Location: Daytona Beach, Florida, United States

Circuit information
- Surface: Asphalt
- Length: 2.5 mi (4.0 km)
- Turns: 4

Stock car races in the ARCA Menards Series has been held at Daytona International Speedway as part of Daytona Speedweek since 1964.

== General Tire 200 ==
General Tire 200

ARCA Menards Series
- Venue: Daytona International Speedway
- Corporate sponsor: General Tire
- First race: 1964
- Distance: 200 miles (321.868 km)
- Laps: 80
- Previous names: Daytona ARCA 250 (1964–1967); Daytona ARCA 300 (1968–1971); Royal Triton 300 (1972–1973); Daytona ARCA 200 (1974–1997, 2006–2008); First Plus Financial 200 (1998–1999); Pro2Call ARCA 200 (2000); Discount Auto Parts 200 (2001–2002); Advance Discount Auto Parts 200 (2003–2005); Lucas Oil Slick Mist 200 (2009–2012); Lucas Oil 200 Presented by MAVTV (2013–2014); Lucas Oil 200 Presented by Autozone (2015); Lucas Oil 200 Driven by General Tire (2016, 2018-2022); Lucas Oil Complete Engine Treatment 200 (2017); Brandt 200 Supporting Florida FFA (2023); Hard Rock Bet 200 (2024); Chili's Ride the 'Dente 200 (2025)

The 200 miles (320 km) race, known as Daytona ARCA 200, is currently known for sponsorship reasons as the General Tire 200.

=== History ===
In 1990, the race is mostly remembered of a series of accidents, including 1970 winner and 1976 Daytona 500 polesitter Ramo Stott rolling over in the middle of the track and causing a 10 car pile-up. As a result of a wreck late in the race, paramedic Mike Staley, while taking care of Kevin Gundaker, was injured after Bob Keselowski spun into Gundaker's car, thus striking him and tossing him into the air for several feet. In the same wreck, Slick Johnson was killed after striking the turn 4 wall, before being run into from behind by another car.

From 2003 to 2017, the NASCAR Cup pole winners' race was held after the ARCA race. As a result of numerous incidents during the ARCA race, officials ruled a time-certain finish in order to allow the pole winner's race preparations, and the national television broadcast, to begin on time. Daytona changed the schedule in 2018 so the NASCAR Cup pole winners' race would be run the next day to prevent time-certain finishes in the ARCA race.

=== Past winners ===
Year	Date	Driver	Manufacturer	Race distance		Race time	Average speed (mph)	Report
Year	Date	Driver	Manufacturer	Laps	Miles (km)	Race time	Average speed (mph)	Report
1964	February 8	Nelson Stacy	Ford	100	250 (402.336)	1:37:27	154.103	Report
1965	February 7	Iggy Katona	Ford	100	250 (402.336)	1:53:03	132.684	Report
1966	February 20	Jack Bowsher	Ford	100	250 (402.336)	1:31:26	164.053	Report
1967	February 19	Ralph Latham	Plymouth	100	250 (402.336)	1:51:56	134.008	Report
1968	February 18	Andy Hampton	Dodge	120	300 (482.803)	2:01:19	148.372	Report
1969	February 16	Benny Parsons	Ford	120	300 (482.803)	2:01:38	147.985	Report
1970	February 15	Ramo Stott	Plymouth	120	300 (482.803)	2:06:41	142.086	Repory
1971	February 7	Iggy Katona	Dodge	120	300 (482.803)	1:58:27	152.542	Report
1972	February 13	Andy Hampton	Ford	120	300 (482.803)	2:09:20	139.175	Report
1973	February 11	Charlie Blanton	Chevrolet	120	300 (482.803)	1:59:57	150.062	Report
1974	February 10	Iggy Katona	Dodge	80	200 (321.868)	1:22:44	145.044	Report
1975	February 9	Ron Hutcherson	Plymouth	80	200 (321.868)	1:22:28	145.513	Report
1976	February 8	Lennie Pond	Chevrolet	80	200 (321.868)	1:18:21	153.224	Report
1977	February 13	Woody Fisher	Dodge	80	200 (321.868)	1:19:01	151.867	Report
1978	February 12	Jim Sauter	Dodge	80	200 (321.868)	1:31:46	130.766	Report
1979	February 11	Kyle Petty	Dodge	80	200 (321.868)	1:30:55	131.964	Report
1980	February 10	John Rezek	Oldsmobile	80	200 (321.868)	1:34:36	126.849	Report
1981	February 8	Tim Richmond	Oldsmobile	80	200 (321.868)	1:23:28	143.77	Report
1982	February 7	Joe Ruttman	Oldsmobile	80	200 (321.868)	1:22:21	145.719	Report
1983	February 14	Ferrel Harris	Oldsmobile	80	200 (321.868)	1:23:19	144.202	Report
1984	February 12	Rick Wilson	Buick	80	200 (321.868)	1:19:14	151.451	Report
1985	February 10	Glenn Sears	Pontiac	80	200 (321.868)	1:32:31	129.660	Report
1986	February 9	Grant Adcox	Chevrolet	80	200 (321.868)	1:31:47	130.743	Report
1987	February 8	Ralph Jones	Ford	80	200 (321.868)	1:33:27	128.411	Report
1988	February 7	Mickey Gibbs	Ford	80	200 (321.868)	1:20:42	148.699	Report
1989	February 12	Ben Hess	Oldsmobile	80	200 (321.868)	1:48:27	110.65	Report
1990	February 11	Jimmy Horton	Pontiac	80	200 (321.868)	1:39:50	120.2	Report
1991	February 10	Ben Hess	Oldsmobile	80	200 (321.868)	1:33:24	128.48	Report
1992	February 8	Jimmy Horton	Chevrolet	80	200 (321.868)	1:40:03	119.94	Report
1993	February 7	Jeff Purvis	Chevrolet	80	200 (321.868)	1:23:29	143.741	Report
1994	February 13	Mike Wallace	Chevrolet	80	200 (321.868)	1:49:04	110.024	Report
1995	February 12	Andy Hillenburg	Chevrolet	80	200 (321.868)	1:32:06	130.293	Report
1996	February 11	Jeff Purvis	Chevrolet	80	200 (321.868)	1:20:29	149.099	Report
1997	February 9	Andy Hillenburg	Chevrolet	80	200 (321.868)	1:30:06	133.185	Report
1998	February 8	Kenny Irwin Jr.	Ford	80	200 (321.868)	1:18:20	153.191	Report
1999	February 7	Bobby Gerhart	Chevrolet	80	200 (321.868)	1:38:26	121.91	Report
2000	February 13	David Keith	Ford	80	200 (321.868)	1:31:49	130.695	Report
2001	February 11	Ryan Newman	Ford	80	200 (321.868)	1:50:40	108.434	Report
2002	February 10	Bobby Gerhart	Pontiac	54*	135 (217.261)	1:08:18	118.594	Report
2003	February 8	Chase Montgomery	Pontiac	80	200 (321.868)	1:40:48	119.048	Report
2004	February 7	Kyle Busch	Chevrolet	80	200 (321.868)	1:39:40	121.131	Report
2005	February 12	Bobby Gerhart	Chevrolet	65*	162.5 (261.518)	1:43:58	93.78	Report
2006	February 12*	Bobby Gerhart	Chevrolet	83*	207.5 (333.938)	1:59:31	104.17	Report
2007	February 10	Bobby Gerhart	Chevrolet	80	200 (321.868)	1:54:56	104.408	Report
2008	February 9	Michael Annett	Toyota	80	200 (321.868)	1:44:21	114.998	Report
2009	February 7	James Buescher	Toyota	80	200 (321.868)	2:01:21	98.888	Report
2010	February 6	Bobby Gerhart	Chevrolet	80	200 (321.868)	1:49:23	109.706	Report
2011	February 12	Bobby Gerhart	Chevrolet	80	200 (321.868)	1:38:03	122.387	Report
2012	February 18	Bobby Gerhart	Chevrolet	83*	207.5 (333.938)	1:33:47	132.753	Report
2013	February 16	John Wes Townley	Toyota	80	200 (321.868)	1:29:18	135.9	Report
2014	February 15	Grant Enfinger	Ford	80	200 (321.868)	1:32:18	130.011	Report
2015	February 14	Grant Enfinger	Chevrolet	80	200 (321.868)	1:30:25	132.719	Report
2016	February 13	John Wes Townley	Chevrolet	80	200 (321.868)	1:27:45	136.752	Report
2017	February 18	Austin Theriault	Chevrolet	75*	187.5 (301.752)	1:51:14	101.139	Report
2018	February 10	Michael Self	Toyota	92*	230 (370.149)	2:10:35	105.68	Report
2019	February 9	Harrison Burton	Toyota	86*	215 (346.008)	1:41:51	126.655	Report
2020	February 8	Michael Self	Toyota	80	200 (321.868)	1:43:45	115.663	Report
2021	February 13	Corey Heim	Toyota	82*	205 (329.916)	1:43:06	119.302	Report
2022	February 19	Corey Heim	Toyota	80	200 (321.868)	1:34:39	126.783	Report
2023	February 18	Greg Van Alst	Chevrolet	80	200 (321.868)	1:56:29	103.019	Report
2024	February 16–17*	Gus Dean	Toyota	84*	210 (337.961)	2:07:17	98.992	Report
2025	February 15	Brenden Queen	Chevrolet	80	200 (321.868)	2:04:25	95.450	Report
2026	February 14	Gio Ruggiero	Toyota	84*	210 (337.961)	2:01:04	103.562	Report

==== Notes ====
- 2002: The race was shortened due to rain.
- 2005 & 2017: The race was shortened due to time limit constraints as a result of numerous incidents.
- 2006: The race was postponed due to persistent rain.
- 2006, 2012, 2018–19, 2021, 2024 & 2026: The race was extended due to an ARCA Overtime. 2018 took two attempts after two large crashes.
- 2024: The race was moved from Saturday afternoon to Friday night due to the threat of rain. The race finished just after midnight on Saturday.

==== Manufacturer wins ====
# Wins	Manufacturer	Years won
21	Chevrolet	1973, 1976, 1986, 1992–97, 1999, 2004–07, 2010–12, 2015–17, 2023, 2025
11	Ford	1964–66, 1969, 1972, 1987–88, 1998, 2000–01, 2014
9	Toyota	2008–09, 2013, 2018–22, 2024, 2026
6	Dodge	1968,1971,1974,1977–79
4	Pontiac	1985, 1990, 2002–03

== General Tire 100 ==
General Tire 100
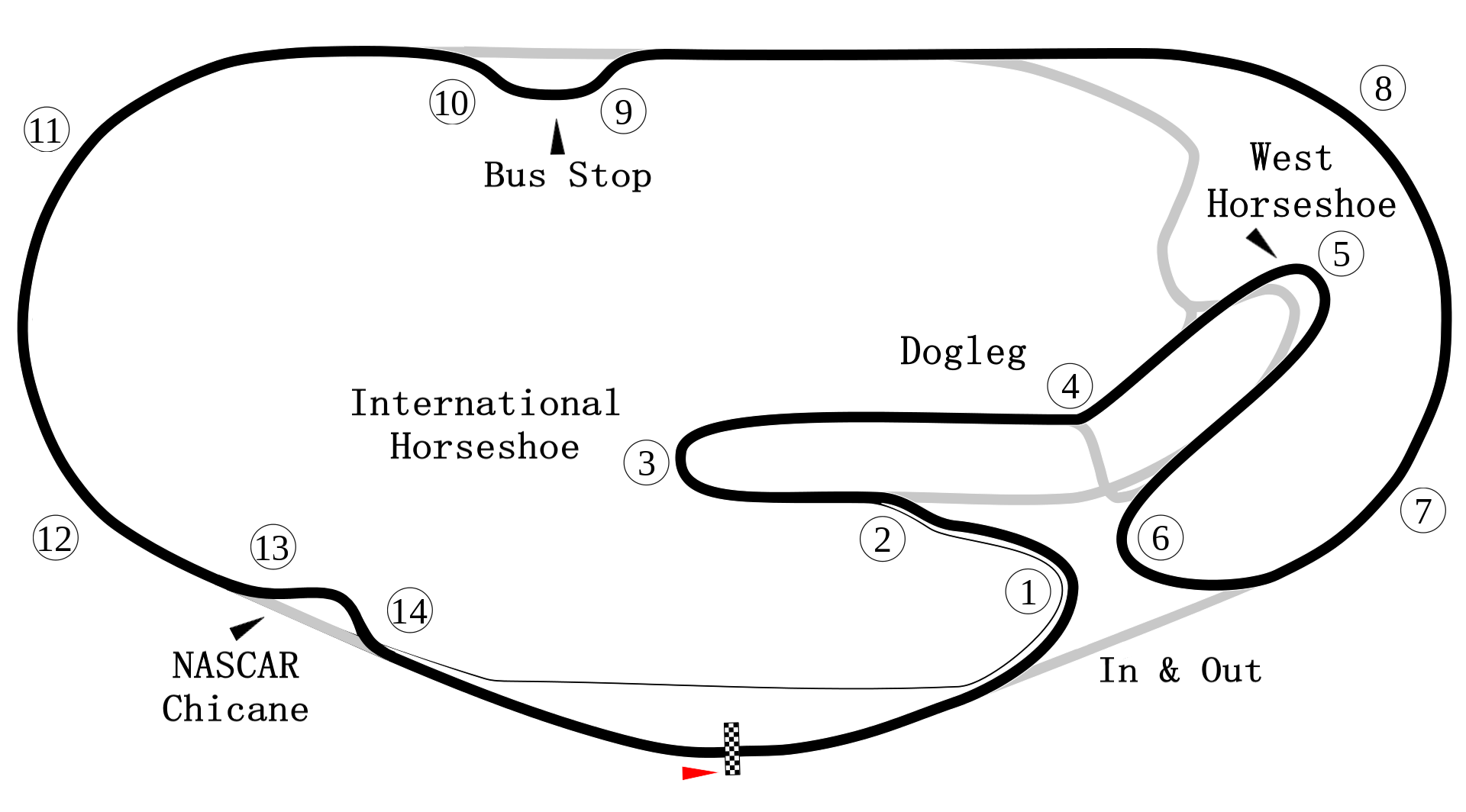

ARCA Menards Series
- Venue: Daytona International Speedway road course
- Location: Daytona Beach, Florida
- Corporate sponsor: General Tire
- First race: 2020
- Last race: 2020
- Distance: 101.1 miles (162.704 km)
- Laps: 28
- Most wins (driver): Michael Self (1)
- Most wins (team): Venturini Motorsports (1)
- Most wins (manufacturer): Toyota (1)

Circuit information
- Surface: Asphalt
- Length: 3.61 mi (5.81 km)
- Turns: 14

In 2020, as a result of schedule realignment due to COVID-19 pandemic, a one-off race was held at the road course named General Tire 100, as part of Daytona road course weekend that also featured the three NASCAR national series. Michael Self won the only ARCA race held at the track, postponed from what originally was to be an afternoon race to a night race because of inclement weather (wet tires, however, were used during the race).

Although the top three series did return to the Daytona road course the following year due to another COVID-19 related rescheduling, the ARCA series did not return that year.

=== Road course race winners ===
Year	Date	Driver	Manufacturer	Race distance		Race time	Average speed (mph)	Report
Year	Date	Driver	Manufacturer	Laps	Miles (km)	Race time	Average speed (mph)	Report
2020	August 14	Michael Self	Toyota	28	101.1 (162.704)	1:16:10	79.625	Report

Previous race: Owens Corning 200 (the previous season)	ARCA Menards Series; Daytona ARCA 200	Next race: General Tire 150 (Phoenix)
