= Glenn Jarrett =

American racing driver (born 1950)

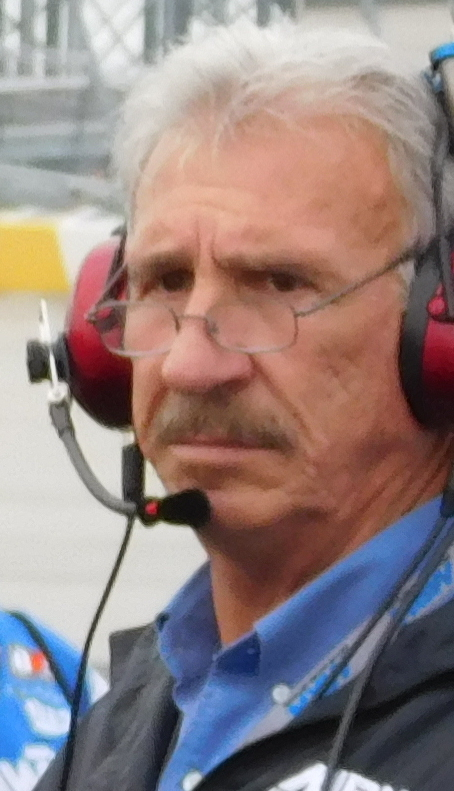
- Jarrett in 2016
- Born: August 11, 1950 (age 76)

NASCAR Cup Series career
- 10 races run over 6 years
- Best finish: 58th (1981)
- First race: 1978 NAPA National 500 (Charlotte)
- Last race: 1983 Like Cola 500 (Pocono)
Wins	Top tens	Poles
0	0	0

NASCAR O'Reilly Auto Parts Series career
- 67 races run over 7 years
- Best finish: 13th (1984)
- First race: 1982 TranSouth 200 (Darlington)
- Last race: 1993 Polaroid 300 (Orange County, NC)
Wins	Top tens	Poles
0	13	0

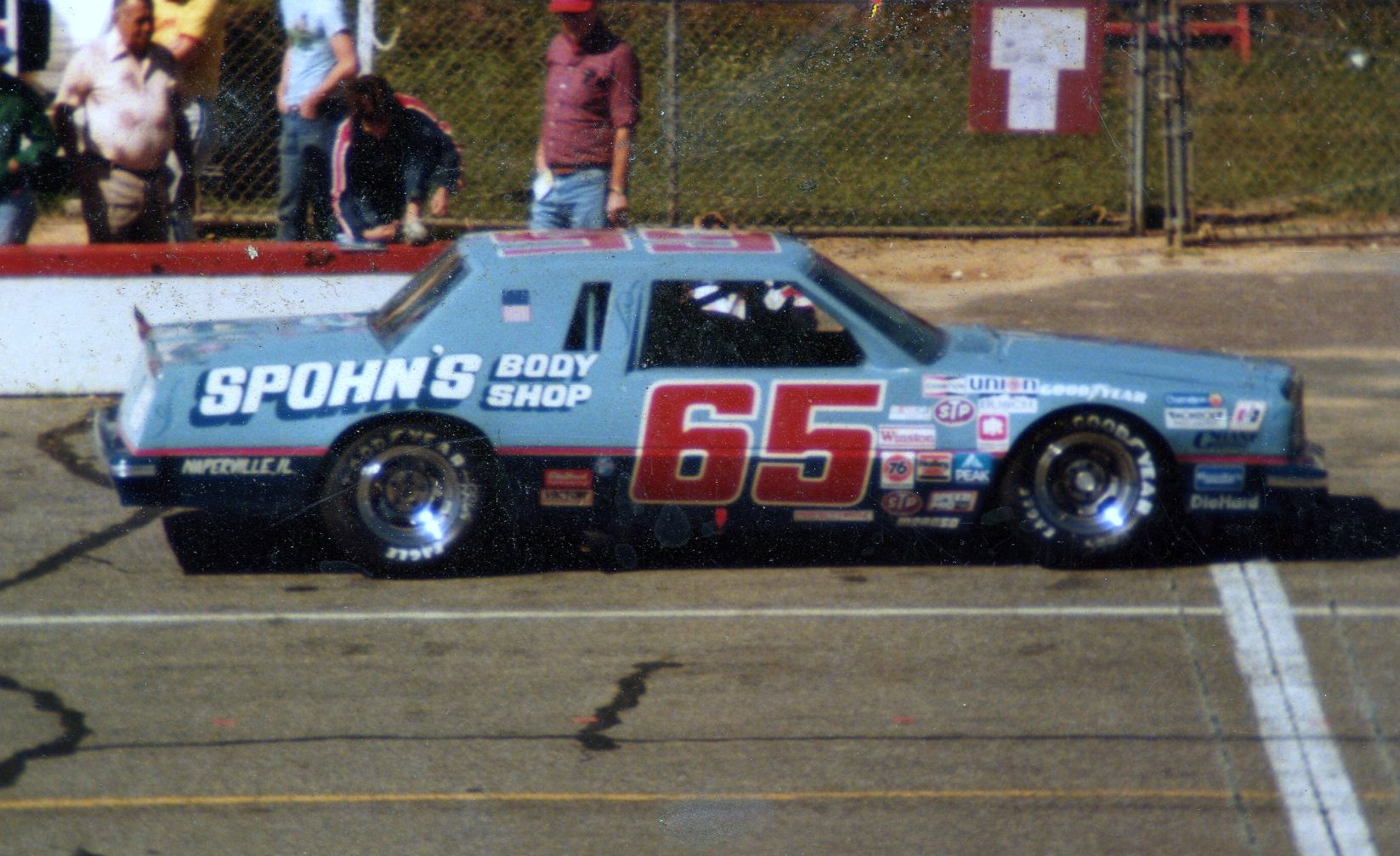
Jarrett's final Cup race at Pocono in 1983

Glenn Jarrett (born August 11, 1950) is an American former NASCAR driver from Conover, North Carolina and the oldest son of Ned Jarrett and older brother of Dale Jarrett. He made ten Winston Cup starts from 1978 to 1983 with a best finish of 12th at Ontario Motor Speedway. He then drove in the Busch Series where he made 67 starts from 1982 to 1993 with a best finish of fourth and finished 13th in 1984 series points. He was then a pit reporter for TNN's coverage of NASCAR. After TNN's coverage ceased he became a pit reporter for Speed Channel and was used when Speed Channel needed to cover multiple NASCAR races at different facilities on the same day.

In 1982, Jarrett was a technical advisor to the Kenny Rogers movie Six Pack.

Jarrett is currently a pit reporter for MRN radio coverage.

== Motorsports career results ==
=== NASCAR ===
(key) (Bold – Pole position awarded by qualifying time. Italics – Pole position earned by points standings or practice time. * – Most laps led.)

==== Winston Cup Series ====
NASCAR Winston Cup Series results
Year	Team	No.	Make	1	2	3	4	5	6	7	8	9	10	11	12	13	14	15	16	17	18	19	20	21	22	23	24	25	26	27	28	29	30	31	NWCC	Pts	Ref
1978	Edwards Racing	16	Olds	RSD	DAY	RCH	CAR	ATL	BRI	DAR	NWS	MAR	TAL	DOV	CLT	NSV	RSD	MCH	DAY	NSV	POC	TAL	MCH	BRI	DAR	RCH	DOV	MAR	NWS	CLT; 20	CAR	ATL	ONT		86th	103	
1979	Dean Racing	49	Chevy	RSD	DAY	CAR	RCH	ATL	NWS	BRI	DAR	MAR	TAL	NSV	DOV	CLT; 29	TWS	RSD	MCH	DAY	NSV	POC	TAL	MCH	BRI	DAR	RCH	DOV	MAR	CLT	NWS				119th	67	
1979	Gray Racing	19	Chevy																													CAR; 32	ATL	ONT	119th	67	
1980		84	Chevy	RSD	DAY	RCH	CAR	ATL	BRI	DAR	NWS	MAR	TAL	NSV	DOV	CLT	TWS	RSD	MCH	DAY	NSV	POC	TAL	MCH	BRI	DAR	RCH	DOV	NWS	MAR	CLT	CAR; 34	ATL		NA	-	
1980	Hamby Racing	17	Chevy																															ONT; 12	NA	-	
1981	Hamby Racing	17	Chevy	RSD	DAY; 19	RCH; 25	CAR; 27	ATL	BRI	NWS	DAR	MAR	TAL	NSV	DOV	CLT	TWS	RSD	MCH	DAY	NSV	POC	TAL	MCH	BRI	DAR	RCH	DOV	MAR	NWS	CLT	CAR	ATL	RSD	60th	276	
1982	Thackston Racing	49	Ford	DAY	RCH	BRI	ATL	CAR	DAR	NWS	MAR	TAL	NSV	DOV	CLT	POC	RSD	MCH	DAY	NSV	POC	TAL	MCH	BRI	DAR	RCH	DOV	NWS	CLT	MAR	CAR	ATL; 39	RSD		104th	46	
1983	Spohn Racing	65	Ford	DAY	RCH	CAR	ATL	DAR	NWS	MAR	TAL	NSV	DOV	BRI	CLT	RSD	POC	MCH; DNQ	DAY	NSV	POC; 36	TAL	MCH	BRI	DAR	RCH	DOV	MAR	NWS	CLT	CAR	ATL	RSD		95th	55	
1985	Ronnie Thomas Racing	41	Chevy	DAY; DNQ	RCH	CAR	ATL	BRI	DAR	NWS	MAR	TAL	DOV	CLT	RSD	POC	MCH	DAY	POC	TAL	MCH	BRI	DAR	RCH	DOV	MAR	NWS	CLT	CAR	ATL	RSD				NA	-	

===== Daytona 500 =====
Year	Team	Manufacturer	Start	Finish
1981	Hamby Racing	Chevrolet	23	19
1985	Ronnie Thomas Racing	Chevrolet	DNQ	

==== Busch Series ====
NASCAR Busch Series results
Year	Team	No.	Make	1	2	3	4	5	6	7	8	9	10	11	12	13	14	15	16	17	18	19	20	21	22	23	24	25	26	27	28	29	30	31	32	33	34	35	NXSC	Pts	Ref
1982	Thackston Racing	24	Ford	DAY	RCH	BRI	MAR	DAR; 7	HCY	SBO	CRW	RCH	LGY	DOV	HCY	CLT; 10	ASH	HCY	SBO	CAR; 27	CRW	SBO	HCY	LGY	IRP; 11	BRI; 7	HCY	RCH	MAR	CLT; 4	HCY	MAR							34th	798	
1983	Thackston Racing	24	Ford	DAY; 28	RCH	CAR; 29	HCY	MAR; 25	NWS	SBO; 15	GPS; 23	LGY	DOV; 5		CLT; 25	SBO	HCY	ROU	SBO; 23	ROU	CRW	ROU	SBO	HCY	LGY	IRP; 23	GPS	BRI	HCY	DAR; 6	RCH	NWS; 13	SBO	MAR	ROU	CLT; 8	HCY	MAR; 42	23rd	1448	
1983		67	Chevy											BRI; 18																									23rd	1448	
1984	Thackston Racing	24	Ford	DAY; 38	RCH	CAR; 33	HCY; 13	MAR; 15	DAR; 27	ROU; 16	NSV; 8		MLW; 17	DOV; 22	CLT; 36	SBO	HCY; 9	ROU; 21	SBO; 13	ROU	HCY; 21	IRP; 18	LGY; 12	SBO; 7	BRI; 12	DAR; 23	RCH; 18		CLT; 11	HCY; 11	CAR; 34	MAR; 30							13th	2608	
1984		05	Pontiac									LGY; 25																											13th	2608	
1984	All Star Racing	15	Pontiac																									NWS; 23											13th	2608	
1985	Thackston Racing	24	Ford	DAY; 39	CAR; 10	HCY	BRI; 22		DAR; 36	SBO	LGY	DOV	CLT	SBO	HCY	ROU	IRP	SBO	LGY	HCY	MLW	BRI	DAR	RCH	NWS	ROU	CLT	HCY	CAR	MAR									45th	438	
1985		53	Pontiac					MAR; 19																															45th	438	
1987	Thackston Racing	24	Ford	DAY; 33	HCY	MAR	DAR; 36	BRI	LGY	SBO	CLT; 12	DOV; 31	IRP	ROU; DNQ	JFC	OXF	SBO	HCY; 17	RAL; 11	LGY	ROU; 10	BRI; 11	JFC; 15	DAR; 28	RCH	DOV; 12	MAR; 12	CLT; 8	CAR; 27	MAR									27TH	1497	
1988	Thackston Racing	24	Ford	DAY; 34	HCY	CAR	MAR	DAR	BRI	LNG	NZH	SBO	NSV	CLT	DOV	ROU	LAN	LVL	MYB	OXF	SBO	HCY	LNG	IRP	ROU	BRI	DAR	RCH	DOV	MAR	CLT	CAR	MAR						91st	61	
1993	Henderson Motorsports	75	Olds	DAY	CAR	RCH	DAR	BRI	HCY	ROU	MAR	NZH	CLT	DOV	MYB	GLN	MLW	TAL	IRP	MCH	NHA	BRI	DAR	RCH	DOV	ROU; 13	CLT	MAR	CAR	HCY	ATL								83rd	124	
1994	Thackston Racing	24	Ford	DAY; DNQ	CAR	RCH	ATL	MAR	DAR	HCY	BRI	ROU	NHA	NZH	CLT	DOV	MYB	GLN	MLW	SBO	TAL	HCY	IRP	MCH	BRI	DAR	RCH	DOV	CLT	MAR	CAR								NA	-	
