= 1988 Atlanta Journal 500 =

29th race of the 1988 NASCAR Winston Cup Series

Race details
- Race 29 of 29 in the 1988 NASCAR Winston Cup Series
- The 1988 Atlanta Journal 500 program cover, featuring Bill Elliott.
- Date: November 20, 1988
- Official name: 29th Annual Atlanta Journal 500
- Location: Hampton, Georgia, Atlanta International Raceway
- Course: Permanent racing facility
- Course length: 1.522 miles (2.449 km)
- Distance: 328 laps, 499.216 mi (803.41 km)
- Average speed: 140.229 miles per hour (225.677 km/h)
- Attendance: 70,000

Pole position
Driver	Rusty Wallace	Blue Max Racing
- Time: 30.525

Most laps led
Driver	Rusty Wallace	Blue Max Racing
- Laps: 166

Winner
No. 27	Rusty Wallace	Blue Max Racing

Television in the United States
- Network: ESPN
- Announcers: Bob Jenkins, Ned Jarrett, Gary Nelson

Radio in the United States
- Radio: Motor Racing Network

The 1988 Atlanta Journal 500 was the 29th and final stock car race of the 1988 NASCAR Winston Cup Series season and the 29th iteration of the event. The race was held on Sunday, November 20, 1988, before an audience of 70,000 in Hampton, Georgia, at Atlanta International Raceway, a 1.522 miles (2.449 km) permanent asphalt quad-oval intermediate speedway. The race took the scheduled 328 laps to complete.

For the battle of the race's victory, Blue Max Racing's Rusty Wallace managed to dominate a majority of the race, leading 166 laps en route to his tenth career NASCAR Winston Cup Series and his sixth and final victory of the season, earning the maximum points possible for a driver to gain in a race. To fill out the top three, Ranier-Lundy Racing's Davey Allison and Stavola Brothers Racing's Mike Alexander finished second and third, respectively.

In the battle for the NASCAR Winston Cup Series championship, championship leader Bill Elliott was able to defend his lead in the championship, needing an 18th place or better finish in order to guarantee the championship. While Elliott was not a contender for the race's victory, suffering numerous problems during the race, he was able to maintain a consistent position running around 11th-15th position, finishing 11th to secure the championship, winning the championship over Wallace by 24 points.

The race was the final start for 3-time Winston Cup champion Cale Yarborough, who managed to round out his driving career with a Top 10 finish.

== Background ==
The layout of Atlanta Motor Speedway, the circuit where the race was held.

Atlanta International Raceway is a 1.522-mile race track in Hampton, Georgia, United States, 20 miles (32 km) south of Atlanta. It has annually hosted NASCAR Winston Cup Series stock car races since its inauguration in 1960.

The venue was bought by Speedway Motorsports in 1990. In 1994, 46 condominiums were built over the northeastern side of the track. In 1997, to standardize the track with Speedway Motorsports' other two intermediate ovals, the entire track was almost completely rebuilt. The frontstretch and backstretch were swapped, and the configuration of the track was changed from oval to quad-oval, with a new official length of 1.54-mile (2.48 km) where before it was 1.522-mile (2.449 km). The project made the track one of the fastest on the NASCAR circuit.

=== Entry list ===
- (R) - denotes rookie driver.

#	Driver	Team	Make	Sponsor
1	Dale Jarrett	Ellington Racing	Buick	Port-A-Lube, Bud Light
2	Ernie Irvan (R)	U.S. Racing	Chevrolet	Kroger
3	Dale Earnhardt	Richard Childress Racing	Chevrolet	GM Goodwrench Service
4	Rick Wilson	Morgan–McClure Motorsports	Oldsmobile	Kodak
04	Bill Meacham	Meacham Racing	Oldsmobile	Meacham Racing
5	Geoff Bodine	Hendrick Motorsports	Chevrolet	Levi Garrett
6	Mark Martin	Roush Racing	Ford	Stroh Light
7	Alan Kulwicki	AK Racing	Ford	Zerex
8	Bobby Hillin Jr.	Stavola Brothers Racing	Buick	Miller High Life
9	Bill Elliott	Melling Racing	Ford	Coors Light
10	Ken Bouchard (R)	Whitcomb Racing	Ford	Whitcomb Racing
11	Jerry Churchill	Churchill Racing	Oldsmobile	Churchill Racing
11	Terry Labonte	Junior Johnson & Associates	Chevrolet	Budweiser
12	Mike Alexander	Stavola Brothers Racing	Buick	Miller High Life
14	A. J. Foyt	A. J. Foyt Racing	Oldsmobile	Copenhagen
15	Brett Bodine	Bud Moore Engineering	Ford	Crisco
16	Larry Pearson	Pearson Racing	Chevrolet	Chattanooga Chew
17	Darrell Waltrip	Hendrick Motorsports	Chevrolet	Tide
20	Alan Russell	Russell Racing	Chevrolet	Russell Racing
21	Kyle Petty	Wood Brothers Racing	Ford	Citgo
23	Eddie Bierschwale	B&B Racing	Oldsmobile	Wayne Paging
25	Ken Schrader	Hendrick Motorsports	Chevrolet	Folgers
26	Ricky Rudd	King Racing	Buick	Quaker State
27	Rusty Wallace	Blue Max Racing	Pontiac	Kodiak
28	Davey Allison	Ranier-Lundy Racing	Ford	Texaco, Havoline
29	Cale Yarborough	Cale Yarborough Motorsports	Oldsmobile	Hardee's
30	Michael Waltrip	Bahari Racing	Pontiac	Country Time
31	Jim Sauter	Bob Clark Motorsports	Oldsmobile	Slender You Figure Salons
33	Harry Gant	Mach 1 Racing	Chevrolet	Skoal Bandit
34	Rodney Combs	AAG Racing	Buick	Fab Detergent
36	H. B. Bailey	Bailey Racing	Pontiac	Almeda Auto Parts
43	Richard Petty	Petty Enterprises	Pontiac	STP
44	Sterling Marlin	Hagan Racing	Oldsmobile	Piedmont Airlines
48	Don Hume	Hylton Motorsports	Ford	Hylton Motorsports
50	Bobby Coyle	Dingman Brothers Racing	Pontiac	Dingman Brothers Racing
52	Jimmy Means	Jimmy Means Racing	Pontiac	Eureka
55	Phil Parsons	Jackson Bros. Motorsports	Oldsmobile	Skoal, Crown Central Petroleum
57	Morgan Shepherd	Osterlund Racing	Buick	Valvoline
64	Brad Teague	Potter Racing	Chevrolet	Hardy Chevrolet
68	Derrike Cope	Testa Racing	Ford	Purolator
70	J. D. McDuffie	McDuffie Racing	Pontiac	Rumple Furniture
71	Dave Marcis	Marcis Auto Racing	Chevrolet	Lifebuoy
73	Joe Ruttman	Barkdoll Racing	Ford	Barkdoll Racing
75	Neil Bonnett	RahMoc Enterprises	Pontiac	Valvoline
80	Jimmy Horton (R)	S&H Racing	Ford	S&H Racing
83	Lake Speed	Speed Racing	Oldsmobile	Wynn's, Kmart
88	Greg Sacks	Baker-Schiff Racing	Oldsmobile	Red Baron Frozen Pizza
90	Benny Parsons	Donlavey Racing	Ford	Bull's-Eye Barbecue Sauce
92	David Sosebee	LC Racing	Buick	LC Racing
93	Charlie Baker	Salmon Racing	Chevrolet	Salmon Racing
95	Slick Johnson	Sadler Brothers Racing	Chevrolet	Sadler Brothers Racing
97	Tommy Ellis	Winkle Motorsports	Buick	AC Spark Plug
98	Brad Noffsinger (R)	Curb Racing	Buick	Sunoco

== Qualifying ==
Qualifying was split into two rounds. The first round was held on Friday, November 18, at 2:00 PM EST. Each driver had one lap to set a time. During the first round, the top 20 drivers in the round were guaranteed a starting spot in the race. If a driver was not able to guarantee a spot in the first round, they had the option to scrub their time from the first round and try and run a faster lap time in a second round qualifying run, held on Saturday, November 19, at 10:30 AM EST. As with the first round, each driver had one lap to set a time. For this specific race, positions 21-40 were decided on time, and depending on who needed it, a select amount of positions were given to cars who had not otherwise qualified but were high enough in owner's points; up to two were given.

Rusty Wallace, driving for Blue Max Racing, managed to win the pole, setting a time of 30.525 and an average speed of 179.499 miles per hour (288.876 km/h) in the first round.

11 drivers failed to qualify.

=== Full qualifying results ===
Pos.	#	Driver	Team	Make	Time	Speed
1	27	Rusty Wallace	Blue Max Racing	Pontiac	30.525	179.499
2	3	Dale Earnhardt	Richard Childress Racing	Chevrolet	30.875	177.464
3	15	Brett Bodine	Bud Moore Engineering	Ford	30.925	177.177
4	12	Mike Alexander	Stavola Brothers Racing	Buick	30.934	177.125
5	26	Ricky Rudd	King Racing	Buick	30.944	177.068
6	5	Geoff Bodine	Hendrick Motorsports	Chevrolet	30.977	176.880
7	25	Ken Schrader	Hendrick Motorsports	Chevrolet	30.992	176.794
8	44	Sterling Marlin	Hagan Racing	Oldsmobile	31.105	176.152
9	11	Terry Labonte	Junior Johnson & Associates	Chevrolet	31.109	176.129
10	6	Mark Martin	Roush Racing	Ford	31.142	175.942
11	83	Lake Speed	Speed Racing	Oldsmobile	31.164	175.818
12	7	Alan Kulwicki	AK Racing	Ford	31.174	175.762
13	17	Darrell Waltrip	Hendrick Motorsports	Chevrolet	31.203	175.599
14	4	Rick Wilson	Morgan–McClure Motorsports	Oldsmobile	31.215	175.531
15	23	Eddie Bierschwale	B&B Racing	Oldsmobile	31.246	175.357
16	64	Brad Teague	Potter Racing	Chevrolet	31.249	175.340
17	57	Morgan Shepherd	Osterlund Racing	Pontiac	31.335	174.859
18	75	Neil Bonnett	RahMoc Enterprises	Pontiac	31.349	174.781
19	55	Phil Parsons	Jackson Bros. Motorsports	Oldsmobile	31.351	174.770
Failed to lock in Round 1
20	43	Richard Petty	Petty Enterprises	Pontiac	30.903	177.303
21	21	Kyle Petty	Wood Brothers Racing	Ford	31.041	176.515
22	33	Harry Gant	Mach 1 Racing	Chevrolet	31.090	176.237
23	28	Davey Allison	Ranier-Lundy Racing	Ford	31.102	176.169
24	14	A. J. Foyt	A. J. Foyt Racing	Oldsmobile	31.170	175.784
25	68	Derrike Cope	Testa Racing	Ford	31.221	175.497
26	29	Cale Yarborough	Cale Yarborough Motorsports	Oldsmobile	31.335	174.859
27	16	Larry Pearson	Pearson Racing	Chevrolet	31.353	174.758
28	30	Michael Waltrip	Bahari Racing	Pontiac	31.393	174.536
29	9	Bill Elliott	Melling Racing	Ford	31.408	174.452
30	2	Ernie Irvan (R)	U.S. Racing	Pontiac	31.435	174.303
31	97	Tommy Ellis	Winkle Motorsports	Buick	31.444	174.253
32	80	Jimmy Horton (R)	S&H Racing	Ford	31.448	174.230
33	90	Benny Parsons	Donlavey Racing	Ford	31.457	174.181
34	1	Dale Jarrett	Ellington Racing	Buick	31.463	174.147
35	98	Brad Noffsinger (R)	Curb Racing	Buick	31.493	173.982
36	34	Rodney Combs	AAG Racing	Buick	31.501	173.937
37	52	Jimmy Means	Jimmy Means Racing	Pontiac	31.513	173.871
38	8	Bobby Hillin Jr.	Stavola Brothers Racing	Buick	31.532	173.766
39	36	H. B. Bailey	Bailey Racing	Pontiac	31.594	173.425
Provisionals
40	71	Dave Marcis	Marcis Auto Racing	Chevrolet	31.742	172.617
41	31	Jim Sauter	Bob Clark Motorsports	Oldsmobile	32.607	168.038
Forced to start at rear
42	88	Greg Sacks	Baker–Schiff Racing	Oldsmobile	31.389	174.558
Failed to qualify
43	48	Don Hume	Hylton Motorsports	Ford	-*	-*
44	93	Charlie Baker	Salmon Racing	Chevrolet	-*	-*
45	73	Joe Ruttman	Barkdoll Racing	Ford	-*	-*
46	50	Bobby Coyle	Dingman Brothers Racing	Pontiac	-*	-*
47	11	Jerry Churchill	Churchill Racing	Oldsmobile	-*	-*
48	95	Slick Johnson	Sadler Brothers Racing	Chevrolet	-*	-*
49	20	Alan Russell	Russell Racing	Chevrolet	-*	-*
50	92	David Sosebee	LC Racing	Buick	-*	-*
51	70	J. D. McDuffie	McDuffie Racing	Pontiac	-*	-*
52	10	Ken Bouchard (R)	Whitcomb Racing	Pontiac	-*	-*
53	04	Bill Meacham	Meacham Racing	Oldsmobile	-*	-*
Official first round qualifying results
Official starting lineup

== Race results ==
Fin	St	#	Driver	Team	Make	Laps	Led	Status	Pts	Winnings
1	1	27	Rusty Wallace	Blue Max Racing	Pontiac	328	166	running	185	$87,575
2	23	28	Davey Allison	Ranier-Lundy Racing	Ford	328	26	running	175	$35,625
3	4	12	Mike Alexander	Stavola Brothers Racing	Buick	328	20	running	170	$23,610
4	5	26	Ricky Rudd	King Racing	Buick	328	1	running	165	$14,725
5	13	17	Darrell Waltrip	Hendrick Motorsports	Chevrolet	328	14	running	160	$16,525
6	7	25	Ken Schrader	Hendrick Motorsports	Chevrolet	328	1	running	155	$12,350
7	28	30	Michael Waltrip	Bahari Racing	Pontiac	327	0	running	146	$14,950
8	9	11	Terry Labonte	Junior Johnson & Associates	Chevrolet	327	0	running	142	$12,025
9	38	8	Bobby Hillin Jr.	Stavola Brothers Racing	Buick	327	0	running	138	$8,650
10	26	29	Cale Yarborough	Cale Yarborough Motorsports	Oldsmobile	327	0	running	134	$7,800
11	29	9	Bill Elliott	Melling Racing	Ford	327	0	running	130	$12,500
12	8	44	Sterling Marlin	Hagan Racing	Oldsmobile	327	23	running	132	$8,375
13	18	75	Neil Bonnett	RahMoc Enterprises	Pontiac	327	0	running	124	$10,150
14	2	3	Dale Earnhardt	Richard Childress Racing	Chevrolet	326	49	running	126	$16,750
15	6	5	Geoff Bodine	Hendrick Motorsports	Chevrolet	326	1	running	123	$7,425
16	19	55	Phil Parsons	Jackson Bros. Motorsports	Oldsmobile	326	0	running	115	$6,550
17	14	4	Rick Wilson	Morgan–McClure Motorsports	Oldsmobile	325	0	running	112	$4,230
18	30	2	Ernie Irvan (R)	U.S. Racing	Pontiac	325	0	running	109	$4,575
19	40	71	Dave Marcis	Marcis Auto Racing	Chevrolet	320	1	running	111	$7,620
20	10	6	Mark Martin	Roush Racing	Ford	276	0	engine	103	$5,960
21	27	16	Larry Pearson	Pearson Racing	Chevrolet	272	0	engine	100	$2,205
22	21	21	Kyle Petty	Wood Brothers Racing	Ford	267	0	engine	97	$9,125
23	41	31	Jim Sauter	Bob Clark Motorsports	Oldsmobile	265	6	flywheel	99	$2,990
24	15	23	Eddie Bierschwale	B&B Racing	Oldsmobile	252	0	running	91	$1,960
25	12	7	Alan Kulwicki	AK Racing	Ford	250	13	crash	93	$5,230
26	35	98	Brad Noffsinger (R)	Curb Racing	Buick	234	0	engine	85	$2,100
27	3	15	Brett Bodine	Bud Moore Engineering	Ford	228	0	engine	82	$10,420
28	42	88	Greg Sacks	Baker–Schiff Racing	Oldsmobile	224	1	engine	84	$4,540
29	36	34	Rodney Combs	AAG Racing	Buick	220	0	engine	76	$1,760
30	22	33	Harry Gant	Mach 1 Racing	Chevrolet	206	0	crash	73	$4,425
31	24	14	A. J. Foyt	A. J. Foyt Racing	Oldsmobile	199	5	engine	75	$1,690
32	32	80	Jimmy Horton (R)	S&H Racing	Ford	190	0	water pump	67	$1,670
33	25	68	Derrike Cope	Testa Racing	Ford	166	0	engine	64	$1,650
34	33	90	Benny Parsons	Donlavey Racing	Ford	134	0	crash	61	$5,060
35	39	36	H. B. Bailey	Bailey Racing	Pontiac	105	0	engine	58	$1,605
36	20	43	Richard Petty	Petty Enterprises	Pontiac	84	0	crash	55	$2,195
37	11	83	Lake Speed	Speed Racing	Oldsmobile	66	0	engine	52	$3,550
38	37	52	Jimmy Means	Jimmy Means Racing	Pontiac	63	1	engine	54	$1,540
39	16	64	Brad Teague	Potter Racing	Chevrolet	60	0	engine	46	$1,525
40	17	57	Morgan Shepherd	Osterlund Racing	Pontiac	52	0	water pump	43	$1,525
41	34	1	Dale Jarrett	Ellington Racing	Buick	5	0	crash	40	$1,525
42	31	97	Tommy Ellis	Winkle Motorsports	Buick	2	0	transmission	37	$1,525
Failed to qualify
43		48	Don Hume	Hylton Motorsports	Ford					
44		93	Charlie Baker	Salmon Racing	Chevrolet					
45		73	Joe Ruttman	Barkdoll Racing	Ford					
46		50	Bobby Coyle	Dingman Brothers Racing	Pontiac					
47		11	Jerry Churchill	Churchill Racing	Oldsmobile					
48		95	Slick Johnson	Sadler Brothers Racing	Chevrolet					
49		20	Alan Russell	Russell Racing	Chevrolet					
50		92	David Sosebee	LC Racing	Buick					
51		70	J. D. McDuffie	McDuffie Racing	Pontiac					
52		10	Ken Bouchard (R)	Whitcomb Racing	Pontiac					
53		04	Bill Meacham	Meacham Racing	Oldsmobile					
Official race results

== Standings after the race ==
Drivers' Championship standings

	Pos	Driver	Points
	1	Bill Elliott	4,488
	2	Rusty Wallace	4,464 (-24)
	3	Dale Earnhardt	4,256 (-232)
	4	Terry Labonte	4,007 (–481)
	5	Ken Schrader	3,858 (–630)
	6	Geoff Bodine	3,799 (–689)
	7	Darrell Waltrip	3,764 (–724)
2	8	Davey Allison	3,631 (–857)
1	9	Phil Parsons	3,630 (–858)
1	10	Sterling Marlin	3,621 (–867)
Official driver's standings

- Note: Only the first 10 positions are included for the driver standings.

Previous race: 1988 Checker 500	NASCAR Winston Cup Series; 1988 season	Next race: 1989 Daytona 500
