= 1974 Old Dominion 500 =

Auto race held at Martinsville Speedway in 1974

Race details
- Race 27 of 30 in the 1974 NASCAR Winston Cup Series season
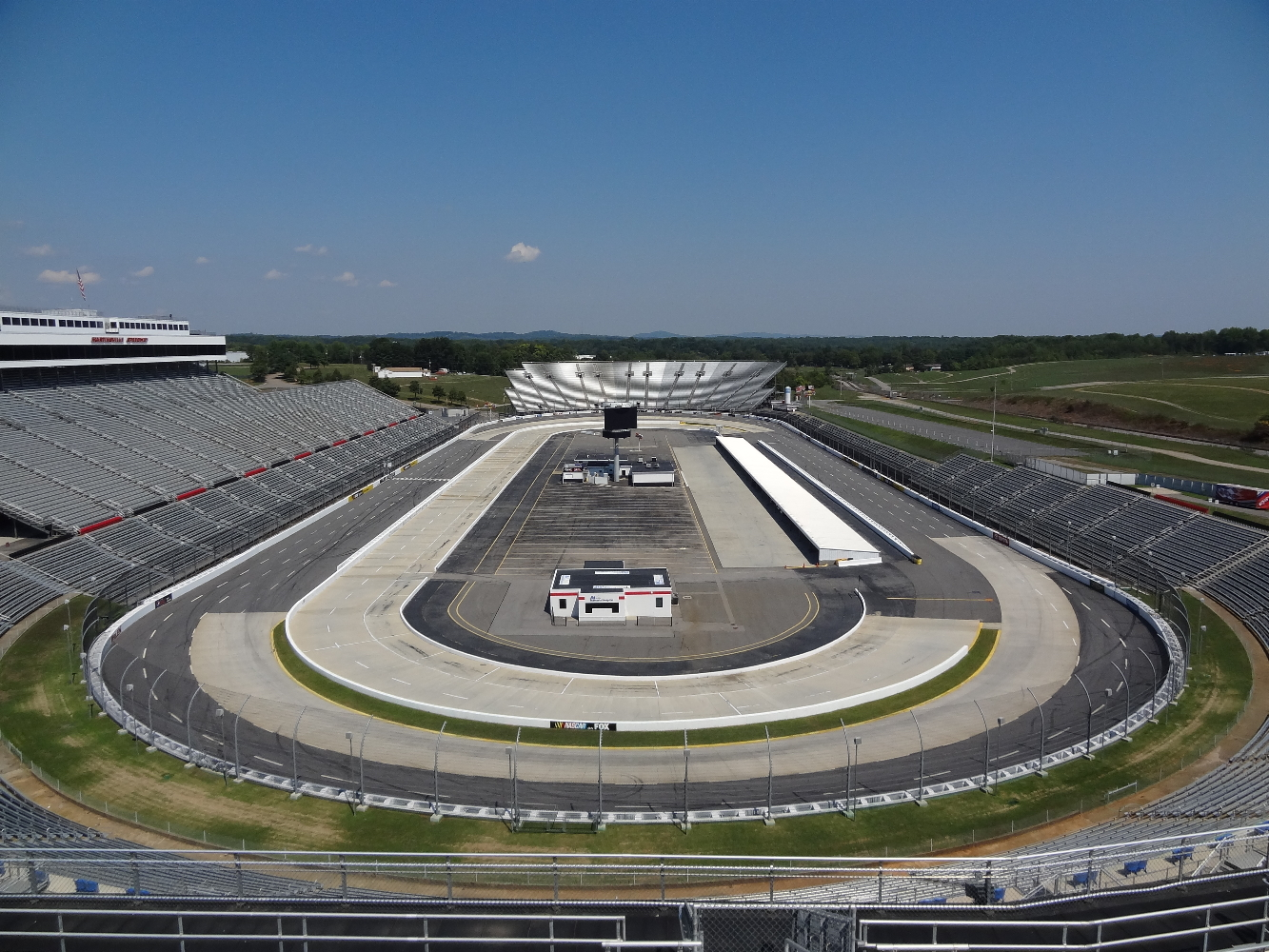
- View from turn one and two bleachers
- Date: September 29, 1974
- Official name: Old Dominion 500
- Location: Martinsville Speedway, Martinsville, Virginia
- Course: Permanent racing facility
- Course length: 0.525 miles (0.844 km)
- Distance: 500 laps, 262.5 mi (442.4 km)
- Weather: Temperatures of 84.9 °F (29.4 °C); wind speeds of 11.8 miles per hour (19.0 km/h)
- Average speed: 66.232 miles per hour (106.590 km/h)
- Attendance: 33,000

Pole position
| Driver | Richard Petty | Petty Enterprises |

Most laps led
| Driver | Cale Yarborough | Junior Johnson & Associates |
- Laps: 288

Winner
| No. 52 | Earl Ross | Junior Johnson & Associates |

Television in the United States
- Network: untelevised
- Announcers: none

The 1974 Old Dominion 500 was a NASCAR Winston Cup Series race that took place on September 29, 1974, at Martinsville Speedway in Martinsville, Virginia.

== Race report ==
Today, the race is a part of the First Data 500 annual series of Martinsville races that occur in the autumn for the NASCAR Sprint Cup Series. The race lasted three hours, fifty-eight minutes, and three seconds. Ten cautions were enacted by NASCAR for seventy-nine laps. The event had an attendance of 33,000 people. Attrition took its toll in this race, as there were only 10 cars left running at the end of the race. While the NASCAR Cup Series had progressed when it came to safety measures by the mid-1970s, a lot of the safety features that would make NASCAR safe and enjoyable at the same time only came after the death of Dale Earnhardt at the 2001 Daytona 500.

Canadian Earl Ross (driving for Junior Johnson) defeated his American opponent Buddy Baker by more than one lap, lapping the entire field in the process. Not too many NASCAR Cup Series drivers in the modern era can say that. Ross was also the first rookie to win a NASCAR Cup Series race; this record would not be broken until Dale Earnhardt won the 1979 Southeastern 500.

He also broke the 23 race winning streak of the "big three drivers" of the 1974 season. Jimmy Hensley leads his first ever laps in the NASCAR Winston Cup Series, and he would have to wait until 1992 to lead again. Sonny Hutchins dominated the first 78 laps of the race and could have easily won the race if his car hadn't blown up; forcing him to crash. Cale Yarborough also looked like a dominant competitor during the race; leading 288 laps during the race and giving the other drivers a difficult time. It was a huge surprise to everyone when he blew an engine with 79 laps to go. Petty, Yarborough and Pearson managed to win 27 out of 30 races in 1974 and the only other drivers to win a race were Bobby Allison, who won twice, and Earl Ross.

This was the final NASCAR Winston Cup Series start for Pee Wee Wentz.

Pole speed was 84.119 miles (135.376 km) per hour while the average speed was 66.232 miles (106.590 km) per hour. Notable drivers at this race included Richard Petty, Elmo Langley, Cale Yarborough, Benny Parsons, Coo Coo Marlin (father of Sterling Marlin), and Richard Childress (future owner of Richard Childress Racing). There were also some equally notable crew chiefs in the race; including Tim Brewer, Travis Carter, Harry Hyde, Dale Inman among others.

There was a thirty driver grid (twenty-nine Americans and one Canadian) compared to the forty-three driver grid of today. The winner received $14,550 ($94,987 when considering inflation) while starting in eleventh place. Modified fan favorite racer Satch Worley makes his Winston Cup debut and scores an impressive top-10 finish.

Until Juan Pablo Montoya's most recent victory at Watkins Glen driving the #42 Chevrolet Impala at the 2010 running of the Heluva Good! Sour Cream Dips at The Glen race, Canadian Earl Ross' victory in this race was the most recent Cup race won by a foreign driver. The most active Canadian driver in the Monster Energy Cup Series today is Patrick Carpentier who participates as a road course ringer at the Watkins Glen, Infineon and the Montreal Nationwide Series race.

=== Technological concerns ===
Improvements in tire and engine technology in the early 1970s had made NASCAR Cup Series vehicles overpowered compared to the limited space that Martinsville Speedway had for breathing space. Further technological advancements by 2013 have caused further concern for driver safety at Martinsville; indicating that the Monster Energy NASCAR Cup Series may have to use restrictor plates in Martinsville if tire/engine technology keeps its current pace of development.

=== Qualifying ===
| Grid | No. | Driver | Manufacturer |
|---|---|---|---|
| 1 | 43 | Richard Petty | '74 Dodge |
| 2 | 01 | Sonny Hutchins | '72 Chevrolet |
| 3 | 72 | Benny Parsons | '73 Chevrolet |
| 4 | 88 | Donnie Allison | '74 Chevrolet |
| 5 | 02 | Jimmy Hensley | '74 Chevrolet |
| 6 | 15 | Buddy Baker | '74 Ford |
| 7 | 11 | Cale Yarborough | '74 Chevrolet |
| 8 | 96 | Richard Childress | '73 Chevrolet |
| 9 | 90 | Paul Radford | '72 Ford |
| 10 | 71 | Ray Hendrick | '74 Dodge |
| 11 | 52 | Earl Ross | '72 Chevrolet |
| 12 | 14 | Coo Coo Marlin | '73 Chevrolet |
| 13 | 54 | Lennie Pond | '74 Chevrolet |
| 14 | 10 | Randy Hutchinson | '72 Ford |
| 15 | 67 | Satch Worley | '72 Plymouth |
| 16 | 30 | Walter Ballard | '74 Chevrolet |
| 17 | 48 | James Hylton | '74 Chevrolet |
| 18 | 70 | J.D. McDuffie | '72 Chevrolet |
| 19 | 64 | Elmo Langley | '72 Ford |
| 20 | 93 | Jackie Rogers | '74 Chevrolet |

== Finishing order ==
Section reference:

1. Earl Ross (the only Canadian to ever win a NASCAR Cup Series race)
2. Buddy Baker†
3. Donnie Allison
4. Dave Marcis
5. Richie Panch†
6. James Hylton†
7. Elmo Langley†
8. Frank Warren
9. Satch Worley*
10. Jabe Thomas
11. Cale Yarborough*†
12. Lennie Pond*
13. D.K. Ulrich
14. Tony Bettenhausen Jr.*†
15. Benny Parsons*†
16. J. D. McDuffie*†
17. Ed Negre*
18. Ray Hendrick*
19. Jimmy Hensley*
20. David Sisco*
21. Sonny Hutchins*†
22. Coo Coo Marlin*
23. Pee Wee Wentz*
24. Richard Childress*
25. Walter Ballard*
26. Cecil Gordon*†
27. Randy Hutchison*
28. Jackie Rogers*
29. Richard Petty*
30. Paul Radford*

* Driver failed to finish race
† Driver is deceased

== Timeline ==
Section reference:

- Start: Sonny Hutchins was leading the starting grid as the green flag was waved.
- Lap 22: Caution due to Paul Radford's engine problems, ended on lap 35.
- Lap 40: Caution due to a two-car accident, ended on lap 43.
- Lap 80: Jimmy Hensley took over the lead from Sonny Hutchins.
- Lap 89: Cale Yarborough took over the lead from Jimmy Hensley.
- Lap 91: Caution due to Walter Ballard's engine problems, ended on lap 98.
- Lap 92: Buddy Baker took over the lead from Cale Yarborough.
- Lap 93: Cale Yarborough took over the lead from Buddy Baker.
- Lap 108: Caution due to Richard Childress' engine problems, ended on lap 117.
- Lap 137: Caution due to Coo Coo Marlin's accident, ended on lap 141.
- Lap 138: Lennie Pond took over the lead from Cale Yarborough.
- Lap 148: Benny Parsons took over the lead from Lennie Pond.
- Lap 181: Cale Yarborough took over the lead from Benny Parson.
- Lap 182: Caution due to Ray Hendrick's accident, ended on lap 189.
- Lap 183: Buddy Baker took over the lead from Cale Yarborough.
- Lap 184: Cale Yarborough took over the lead from Buddy Baker.
- Lap 256: Caution due to J.D. McDuffie's accident, ended on lap 265.
- Lap 346: Caution due to Elmo Langley's accident, ended on lap 352.
- Lap 366: Caution due to Tony Bettenhausen Jr's accident, ended on lap 371.
- Lap 415: Lennie Pond had a terminal crash.
- Lap 421: Cale Yarborough's vehicle had some engine problems which caused him to exit the event.
- Lap 422: Earl Ross took over the lead from Cale Yarborough, Lennie Pond was involved in an accident on turn four.
- Lap 431: Satch Worley's vehicle had a driveshaft issue that forced him out of the race.
- Finish: Earl Ross was officially declared the winner of the event.

| Preceded by 1974 Wilkes 400 | NASCAR Winston Cup Season; 1974 | Succeeded by 1974 National 500 |

| Preceded by 1973 | Old Dominion 500 races 1974 | Succeeded by 1975 |
