= Don Hume =

American NASCAR racer (1938–2018)

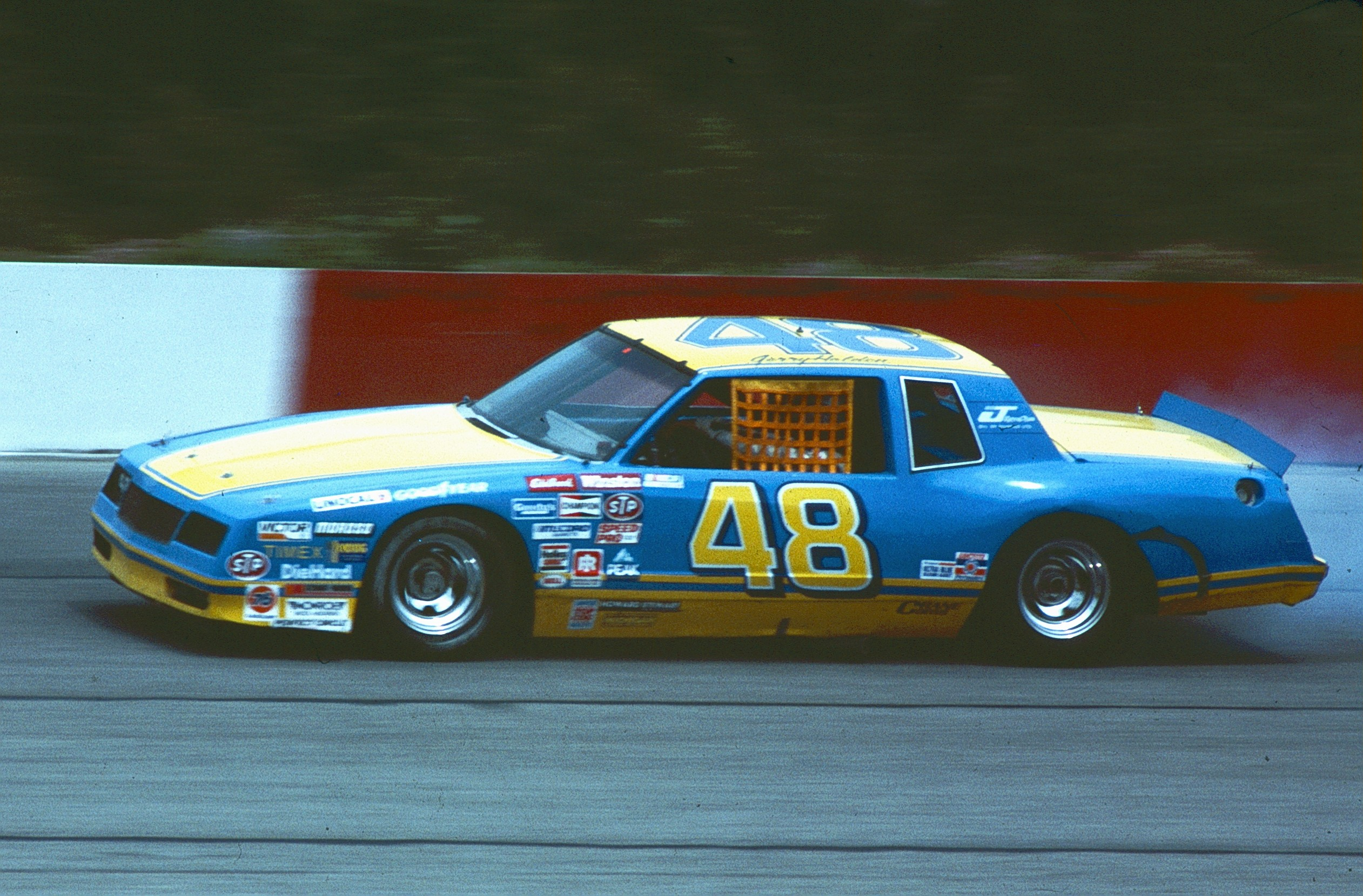
- Born: Donald Russell Hume; May 8, 1938; Belvidere, New Jersey, U.S.
- Died: May 23, 2018 (aged 80); Mooresville, North Carolina, U.S.

NASCAR Cup Series career
- 15 races run over 21 years
- Best finish: 38th (1985)
- First race: 1964 Southern 500 (Darlington)
- Last race: 1985 Summer 500 (Pocono)
Wins	Top tens	Poles
0	0	0
- Statistics up to date as of October 25, 2025.

Donald Russell Hume (May 8, 1938 – May 23, 2018) is an American former NASCAR driver from Belvidere, New Jersey. In his limited NASCAR career, Hume competed in fifteen Winston Cup events.

== Winston Cup ==
=== 1964 ===
Hume appeared in the series in 1964, completing two races late in the year. In his debut at Darlington, Hume started 28th but slid to 38th after an early crash. Hume would then barely improve at Charlotte, where he finished 35th due to overheating.

=== 1965 ===
Hume had a significantly better season in 1965, when he competed in four events. He only managed to finish one of the four races. That race, at Charlotte, Hume finished eighteenth. All of his DNFs were due to mechanical issues.

=== 1981 ===
Hume returned to the series after a sixteen-year absence in 1981, completing one race for D.K. Ulrich. He started the race at Rockingham in 33rd position and would finish there after an early race crash.

=== 1984 ===
Another multiple year absence ended in 1984, when Hume ran a race for Bahari Racing. After starting 23rd at Atlanta, Hume came home with a 26th-place finish. He would finish that event twenty-nine laps down.

=== 1985 ===
Hume ended his career with a seven-race stretch in 1985. It was a decent season, driving for James Hylton. In his seven starts, he once again struggled to finish races, only completing four of those. However, all four ended up being top-21 finishes. The best of the year, and his career, was a 16th-place effort at Bristol. After a 38th place showing in points, Hume was replaced and he has not driven in NASCAR since.
