= Ralph Latham =

Australian rules footballer

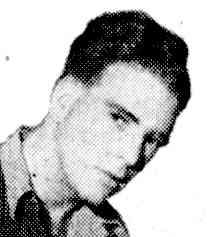

Personal information
- Full name: William Ralph Latham
- Born: 17 October 1924; Wickepin, Western Australia
- Died: 11 June 2012 (aged 87); Merriwa, Western Australia
- Original team: West Perth
- Height: 185 cm (6 ft 1 in)
- Weight: 85.5 kg (188 lb)

Playing career^{1}
| Years | Club | Games (Goals) |
| 1942 | West Perth | 12 (33) |
| 1943 | Swan Districts | 15 (40) |
| 1945 | Melbourne | 16 (11) |
| 1946–52 | Swan Districts | 77 (171) |
- ^{1} Playing statistics correct to the end of 1952.

William Ralph Latham (17 October 1924 – 11 June 2012) was an Australian rules footballer who played with Melbourne in the Victorian Football League (VFL) and West Perth and Swan Districts in the West Australian Football League.
