= 1979 Coca-Cola 500 =

Auto race held at Pocono International Raceway in 1979

Race details
- Race 19 of 31 in the 1979 NASCAR Winston Cup Series season
- 1979 Coca-Cola 500 program cover, featuring Darrell Waltrip, winner of last year's race.
- Date: July 30, 1979
- Official name: Coca-Cola 500
- Location: Pocono International Raceway, Long Pond, Pennsylvania
- Course: Permanent racing facility
- Course length: 2.500 miles (3.400 km)
- Distance: 200 laps, 501.0 mi (804 km)
- Weather: Temperatures of 80.1 °F (26.7 °C); wind speeds of 2.9 miles per hour (4.7 km/h)
- Average speed: 115.207 miles per hour (185.408 km/h)
- Attendance: 40,000

Pole position
Driver	Harry Gant	Race Hill Farm Team

Most laps led
Driver	Darrell Waltrip	Al Rudd Auto
- Laps: 62

Winner
No. 11	Cale Yarborough	Junior Johnson & Associates

Television in the United States
- Network: untelevised
- Announcers: none

Radio in the United States
- Radio: Motor Racing Network
- Booth announcers: Jack Arute and Barney Hall
- Turn announcers: Turn 1: Eli Gold; Turn 2: Dave Sutherland; Turn 3: Mike Joy; Pit Reporter: Ned Jarrett

The 1979 Coca-Cola 500 was a NASCAR Winston Cup Series racing event that took place on July 30, 1979, at Pocono International Raceway in Long Pond, Pennsylvania.

By the following season, NASCAR had completely stopped tracking the year model of all the vehicles and most teams did not take stock cars to the track under their own power anymore. Only manual transmission vehicles were allowed to participate in this race; a policy that NASCAR has retained to the present day.

During qualifying an unnamed driver dared James Hylton to turn the slowest lap he could while qualifying. Hylton turned in a blistering 45 mph average for the lap, and NASCAR officials promptly fined him $500.

Pocono Raceway, where the race was held.

== Background ==
Pocono Raceway is one of six superspeedways to hold NASCAR races; the others are Daytona International Speedway, Michigan International Speedway, Auto Club Speedway, Indianapolis Motor Speedway and Talladega Superspeedway. The standard track at Pocono Raceway is a three-turn superspeedway that is 2.5 miles (4.0 km) long. The track's turns are banked differently; the first is banked at 14°, the second turn at 8° and the final turn with 6°. However, each of the three straightaways are banked at 2°.

== Race report ==
While originally scheduled for July 29, 1979, it was postponed one day due to rain. The race was run on Monday, so most of the NASCAR fans had to go work that day.

Two hundred laps were completed in four hours and twenty minutes. Seven cautions flags slowed the race for 49 laps; Cale Yarborough eventually defeated Richard Petty under the race's final yellow flag. This would result in Yarborough's third win of the year. Forty thousand fans attended a live racing event where the average speed of the vehicles would be 115.207 miles per hour (185.408 km/h). None of the drivers on the starting grid were born in Wisconsin; which is still true in 2016. Harry Gant qualified for the pole position with a speed of 148.711 miles per hour (239.327 km/h). The majority of the vehicles involved in the race had Chevrolet as their manufacturer. Steve Gray would make his NASCAR debut that resulted in a last-place finish. He crashed on the very first lap of the race with Roger Hamby and Al Holbert; taking home only $1,305 in winnings ($5,654 when adjusted for inflation).

Dale Earnhardt fractured both of his clavicles when on Lap 98 his right rear tire exploded and he hammered the boilerplate barrier in Turn Two. As a result, he had to miss the next four races (re-emerging at the 1979 running of the Capital City 400).

Darrell Waltrip's championship aspirations took a hit by pitting late in the race and losing the lead for good on lap 187 regulating him to a seventh-place finish while top rival for the championship Richard Petty finished in second place. Had Darrell Waltrip finished ahead of rival Richard Petty, Darrell Waltrip would have probably won the championship in 1979.

A freight train of cars ended up drafting and swapping positions for a majority of the event. Multiple times the lead changed up to four times in a single lap, notably the first two laps and Lap 120 when Waltrip, Yarborough, Petty, and Bonnett raced five abreast with Bobby Allison, a lap down after a distributor wire had to be replaced under yellow, and all nearly crashed in Turn One.

It took 62 starts, but Ricky Rudd finally collects his first lead-lap finish in Winston Cup, nevertheless managing to collect 20 top-10s prior to this event.

Cale Yarborough would take home $21,465 in winnings for finishing first in the race ($92,995 when adjusted for inflation). 56 lead changes were recorded in this race; a rarity outside Talladega Superspeedway and a definite record setter for Pocono Raceway. All of the 39 drivers that qualified for the race were American-born men.

== Race results ==
Fin	St	#	Driver	Make	Team/Owner	Sponsor	Laps	Led	Status	Pts	Winnings
1	2	11	Cale Yarborough	Chevrolet	Junior Johnson & Associates	Busch	200	61	running	180	$21465
2	10	43	Richard Petty	Chevrolet	Petty Enterprises	STP	200	17	running	175	$15465
3	9	28	Buddy Baker	Chevrolet	Ranier-Lundy Racing	W.I.N.	200	7	running	170	$8490
4	5	27	Benny Parsons	Chevrolet	M.C. Anderson Racing	Harrisburg East Mall	200	0	running	160	$7765
5	6	90	Ricky Rudd	Mercury	Donlavey Racing	Truxmore	200	0	running	155	$6215
6	15	72	Joe Millikan	Chevrolet	L. G. DeWitt	Appliance Wheels	200	0	running	150	$7215
7	18	22	Darrell Waltrip	Chevrolet	Al Rudd Auto	Gatorade	200	62	running	156	$2715
8	7	21	Neil Bonnett	Mercury	Wood Brothers Racing	Purolator	200	8	running	147	$2815
9	4	15	Bobby Allison	Ford	Bud Moore Engineering	Hodgdon, Moore	199	1	running	143	$5915
10	16	30	Tighe Scott	Buick	Walter Ballard	Russ Togs	198	0	running	134	$4295
11	23	40	D.K. Ulrich	Chevrolet	D.K. Ulrich	Midwestern Farm Lines	197	0	running	130	$3685
12	39	3	Richard Childress	Chevrolet	Richard Childress Racing	CRC Chemicals	196	0	running	127	$3525
13	13	70	J. D. McDuffie	Chevrolet	J. D. McDuffie	Bailey Excavating	196	0	running	124	$3305
14	17	25	Ronnie Thomas	Chevrolet	Don Robertson	Stone's Cafeteria	196	0	running	121	$4095
15	1	47	Harry Gant	Chevrolet	Jack Beebe (owner)	Race Hill Farm	195	1	running	123	$2915
16	20	52	Jimmy Means	Chevrolet	Jimmy Means Racing	Mr. Transmission	194	0	running	115	$2785
17	24	64	Tommy Gale	Ford	Elmo Langley	Sunny King Ford & Honda	190	0	running	112	$2555
18	25	24	Cecil Gordon	Oldsmobile	Cecil Gordon		189	0	running	109	$2370
19	28	79	Frank Warren	Dodge	Frank Warren	Native Tan	188	0	ignition	106	$2135
20	19	05	Dick Brooks	Chevrolet	Nelson Malloch	Bearfinder	188	0	running	103	$1600
21	36	34	Steve Peles	Chevrolet	Steve Peles		187	0	running	100	$1180
22	21	67	Buddy Arrington	Dodge	Buddy Arrington	Reid Trailer Sales	187	0	ignition	97	$2025
23	12	44	Terry Labonte	Chevrolet	Hagan Racing	Stratagraph	184	0	running	94	$1980
24	29	63	Jocko Maggiacomo	Oldsmobile	Jocko Maggiacomo	Shaw Motors	172	0	running	91	$1105
25	33	09	Nelson Oswald	Chevrolet	Nelson Oswald	J & S Truck Service	168	0	engine	88	$1080
26	34	20	Rick Newsom	Oldsmobile	Rick Newsom	MARS	166	0	running	85	$1055
27	32	01	Earle Canavan	Dodge	Earle Canavan	Green's Auto Parts	140	0	engine	82	$1030
28	22	57	Dick May	Ford	Alfred McClure	McClure Motors	103	0	engine	79	$1005
29	3	2	Dale Earnhardt	Chevrolet	Osterlund Racing	Rod Osterlund	98	43	crash	81	$4680
30	35	61	Wayne Broome	Oldsmobile	Jim Norris (owner)	Jim Norris	92	0	engine	73	$955
31	31	45	Baxter Price	Chevrolet	Baxter Price	Iron Peddlers	88	0	engine	70	$1430
32	27	55	Wayne Watercutter	Chevrolet		Ward Racing Enterprises	48	0	crash	0	$905
33	38	48	James Hylton	Chevrolet	James Hylton Motorsports	Palatine Automotive Parts	40	0	engine	64	$1380
34	11	12	Lennie Pond	Oldsmobile	Kennie Childers	Kencoal Mining	15	0	steering	61	$850
35	14	87	Gary Balough	Oldsmobile	Billie Harvey	Fast Lane Ltd.	9	0	clutch	58	$840
36	37	23	Louis Gatto	Chevrolet		L & J Automotive	5	0	ignition	55	$820
37	8	7	Al Holbert	Chevrolet	Al Holbert	Holbert Porsche-Audi	1	0	crash	52	$1065
38	26	17	Roger Hamby	Oldsmobile	Roger Hamby	Kings Inn	1	0	crash	49	$1310
39	30	19	Steve Gray	Chevrolet	Henley Gray	Belden Asphalt	1	0	crash	46	$1305

== Standings after the race ==
Pos	Driver	Points	Differential
1	Darrell Waltrip	3061	0
2 ▲	Richard Petty	2852	-209
3 ▲	Cale Yarborough	2850	-211
4 ▼	Bobby Allison	2845	-216
5	Dale Earnhardt	2588	-473
6	Benny Parsons	2557	-504
7	Joe Millikan	2471	-590
8	J.D. McDuffie	2263	-798
9	Richard Childress	2256	-805
10 ▲	D.K. Ulrich	2197	-864

Preceded by 1979 Busch Nashville 420	NASCAR Winston Cup Series Season; 1979	Succeeded by 1979 Talladega 500

Preceded by 1978	Coca-Cola 500 races 1979	Succeeded by 1980
