= Satch Worley =

NASCAR driver

- Born: June 2, 1948 (age 78); Rocky Mount, Virginia, U.S.
- Awards: 1983 & 1985 Bowman Gray Stadium Modified Champion

NASCAR Cup Series career
- 5 races run over 2 years
- Best finish: 50th (1978)
- First race: 1974 Old Dominion 500 (Martinsville)
- Last race: 1978 Old Dominion 500 (Martinsville)
| Wins | Top tens | Poles |
|---|---|---|
| 0 | 2 | 0 |

NASCAR O'Reilly Auto Parts Series career
- 9 races run over 2 years
- Best finish: 48th (1983)
- First race: 1982 Mello Yello 300 (Charlotte)
- Last race: 1983 Miller Time 300 (Charlotte)
| Wins | Top tens | Poles |
|---|---|---|
| 0 | 1 | 0 |

Donald 'Satch' Worley (born June 2, 1948, Rocky Mount, Virginia) is a NASCAR Winston Cup Series driver who competed in 1974 and 1978.

== Career ==
Worley competed in his first Cup race at the 1974 Fall Martinsville's race driving Buddy Arrington's No. 67 Plymouth. He started 15th and finished ninth after driveshaft problems. Worley didn't race in Cup again until driving in four races for Jack Beebe's No. 47 Race Hill Farm Team in 1978. In 1985, he attempted to make the Daytona 500 in a car owned by Chip Lain. He didn't make it into the starting lineup for the Daytona 500, but he did finished third in the Daytona 500 consolation race.

Worley competed in five Cup races from 1974 to 1978, in which he earned two top-tens. His best results were two ninth-place finishes at Martinsville in 1974 and Pocono in 1978. He competed in 1729 laps; the equivalent of 1,815.6 miles (2,921.9 km) of racing. Total earnings for Worley in the NASCAR Winston Cup Series was $7,505 ($37,046.36} when adjusted for inflation). Worley started an average of 22nd and finished an average of 13th.

From 1982 to 1983, Worley ran nine Busch Series Races, with a best finish of seventh at Rockingham in 1982.

Worley competed at Bowman Gray Stadium in the 1980s, where he was a two-time track modified champion. He also raced in the NASCAR Modified Series (until the 2000 season). He earned two wins, one at Pocono in 1991, followed by a win at Martinsville in 1992.

== Career results ==
NASCAR Whelen Modified Tour career statistics:

| Year | Races | Wins | Top 5 | Top 10 | Poles | Rank |
|---|---|---|---|---|---|---|
| 1985 | 4 | 0 | 0 | 2 | 0 | 33rd |
| 1986 | 5 | 0 | 1 | 3 | 0 | 29th |
| 1987 | 5 | 0 | 1 | 2 | 0 | 33rd |
| 1988 | 8 | 0 | 3 | 4 | 0 | 25th |
| 1989 | 25 | 0 | 6 | 13 | 0 | 11th |
| 1990 | 23 | 0 | 5 | 15 | 0 | 4th |
| 1991 | 23 | 1 | 4 | 14 | 1 | 8th |
| 1992 | 21 | 1 | 5 | 12 | 2 | 5th |
| 1993 | 17 | 0 | 6 | 9 | 0 | 7th |
| 1994 | 21 | 0 | 4 | 9 | 1 | 12th |
| 1995 | 21 | 0 | 6 | 12 | 0 | 10th |
| 1996 | 5 | 0 | 0 | 1 | 0 | 41st |
| 1997 | 4 | 0 | 0 | 2 | 0 | 43rd |
| 1998 | 9 | 0 | 0 | 2 | 0 | 32nd |
| 1999 | 3 | 0 | 1 | 1 | 0 | |
| Total | 194 | 2 | 42 | 101 | 4 | |
