= Steve Gray (racing driver) =

Racecar driver from Georgia

- Born: August 11, 1956 (age 70); Rome, Georgia, U.S.

NASCAR Cup Series career
- 8 races run over 6 years
- Best finish: 83st - 1984 NASCAR Winston Cup Series season
- First race: 1979 Coca-Cola 500 (Pocono International Raceway)
- Last race: 1985 Van Scoy Diamond Mine 500 (Pocono International Raceway)
Wins	Top tens	Poles
0	6	0

Steve Gray (born August 11, 1956 in Rome, Georgia) is a retired NASCAR Winston Cup Series driver.

== Career ==
Gray has competed from 1979 to 1985 in six different races. Gray has competed in 1321 laps while leading none of them. His average start is 32nd place and his average finish is 29th place; making him finish races generally better than he started them. While failing to qualify at the 1985 Summer 500 racing event, Gray had managed to earn a career total of $10,175 in winnings ($30,458.89 when adjusted for inflation).

Gray has served as the crewchief on both the No. 87 car in both the NASCAR Sprint Cup Series and the Nationwide Series for NEMCO Motorsports and Joe Nemechek. He is now team engineer for Rick Ware Racing.
