= Glenn Sears =

American racing driver (born 1958)

Glenn Sears (born August 18, 1958, in Apex, North Carolina) is a retired professional race car driver who competed in limited NASCAR Busch Series races in the 1980s. Sears was a champion at Wake County Speedway and Southern National Champion in North Carolina as well as winning several NASCAR Sportsman series races.
