= 1985 Summer 500 =

Auto race held at Pocono Raceway in 1985

Race details
- Race 16 of 28 in the 1985 NASCAR Winston Cup Series season
- Pocono Raceway, the race track where the race was held.
- Date: July 21, 1985
- Official name: Summer 500
- Location: Pocono International Raceway, Long Pond, Pennsylvania
- Course: Permanent racing facility
- Course length: 2.500 miles (3.400 km)
- Distance: 200 laps, 501.0 mi (804 km)
- Weather: Temperatures of 86.0 °F (30.0 °C); wind speeds of 6.10 miles per hour (9.82 km/h)
- Average speed: 134.008 miles per hour (215.665 km/h)
- Attendance: 65,000

Pole position
Driver	Darrell Waltrip	Junior Johnson & Associates

Most laps led
Driver	Neil Bonnett	Junior Johnson & Associates
- Laps: 72

Winner
No. 9	Bill Elliott	Melling Racing

Television in the United States
- Network: ESPN
- Announcers: Bob Jenkins; Larry Nuber

The 1985 Summer 500 was a NASCAR Winston Cup Series race that took place on July 21, 1985, at Pocono International Raceway in Long Pond, Pennsylvania.

== Background ==
Pocono Raceway is one of six superspeedways to hold NASCAR races; the others are Daytona International Speedway, Michigan International Speedway, Auto Club Speedway, Indianapolis Motor Speedway, and Talladega Superspeedway. The standard track at Pocono Raceway is a three-turn superspeedway that is 2.5 miles (4.0 km) long. The track's turns are banked differently; the first is banked at 14°, the second turn at 8°, and the final turn with 6°. However, each of the three straightaways is banked at 2°.

== Race report ==
Two hundred laps were completed spanning 500 miles (800 km). David Pearson would lead the final two laps of his career at this race. In a racing-style that is reminiscent of the 1974 Daytona 500, this race had the most lead changes all season at only 36 compared to 75 in the 1984 NASCAR Winston Cup Series season. Mike Stolarcyk would make his only NASCAR Winston Cup Series start at this event; he was from Whitney Point, New York. While Stolaryck started the race in 37th-place; he would only improve his finishing position to 32nd-place.

The race took three hours and forty-two seconds to complete with Bill Elliott defeating Neil Bonnett by five seconds. There were six cautions for 24 laps. Bill Elliott won the pole with a qualifying speed of 151.973 miles per hour (244.577 km/h) while the average speed of the race was 134.008 miles per hour (215.665 km/h). Elliott's 1985 Thunderbird was the same size as Rudd's, Kyle Petty's and Cale's Thunderbirds. They all fit the 1985 Thunderbird NASCAR templates that were standard for the 1985 NASCAR Winston Cup Series season.

Notable crew chiefs who participated in this race included Junie Donlavey, Robin Pemberton, Joey Arrington, Jake Elder, Waddell Wilson, Bud Moore, Harry Hyde, Kirk Shelmerdine and Darrell Bryant. The most dominant drivers in the NASCAR Winston Cup Series during the 1980s were Bill Elliott, Darrell Waltrip, Terry Labonte, Bobby Allison and Dale Earnhardt. Earnhardt blew up his vehicle after 11 laps during the course of the race, thus threatening his dominance of NASCAR during the 1985 season in favor of Bill Elliott and Darrell Waltrip.

Geoff Bodine was the first driver to win the pole, but was stripped of his time shortly after first round qualifying for having illegal fuel. Darrell Waltrip would inherit the award but was stripped for using illegal fuel two weeks after the race was finished. Bill Elliott ended up getting the award instead. There were 40 drivers in the race; 39 of them were American-born while Trevor Boys was born in Canada.

J.D. McDuffie would finish last due to an engine problem on lap 10. This would be one of three starts that year for J.D. McDuffie in a Ford, who rarely ran anything but GM products from 1972 onwards. Bill Elliott's win for Melling Racing would earn him $44,025 in total winnings ($131,789 when adjusted for inflation) while last-place finisher McDuffie would walk away with $2,675 for McDuffie Racing ($8,008 when adjusted for inflation).

=== Qualifying ===
Grid	No.	Driver	Manufacturer	Owner
1	11	Darrell Waltrip	Chevrolet	Junior Johnson
2	9	Bill Elliott	Ford	Harry Melling
3	28	Cale Yarborough	Ford	Harry Ranier
4	55	Benny Parsons	Chevrolet	Leo Jackson / Richard Jackson
5	44	Terry Labonte	Chevrolet	Billy Hagan
6	27	Tim Richmond	Pontiac	Raymond Beadle
7	33	Harry Gant	Chevrolet	Hal Needham
8	47	Ron Bouchard	Buick	Jack Beebe
9	8	Bobby Hillin, Jr.	Chevrolet	Stavola Brothers
10	15	Ricky Rudd	Ford	Bud Moore

Failed to qualify: Steve Gray (racing driver), Mike Potter (#68), George Wiltshire, Bob Park (#19), Bill Scott (#53)

== Top 20 finishers ==
Pos	No.	Driver	Manufacturer	Laps	Laps led	Time/Status
1	9	Bill Elliott	Ford	200	58	3:43:52
2	12	Neil Bonnett	Chevrolet	200	72	+5 seconds
3	11	Darrell Waltrip	Chevrolet	200	3	Lead lap under green flag
4	5	Geoffrey Bodine	Chevrolet	200	29	Lead lap under green flag
5	33	Harry Gant	Chevrolet	200	6	Lead lap under green flag
6	55	Benny Parsons	Chevrolet	200	1	Lead lap under green flag
7	7	Kyle Petty	Ford	200	0	Lead lap under green flag
8	66	Phil Parsons	Chevrolet	199	0	+1 lap
9	47	Ron Bouchard	Buick	199	0	+1 lap
10	88	Buddy Baker	Oldsmobile	199	0	+1 lap
11	75	Lake Speed	Pontiac	198	0	+2 laps
12	22	Bobby Allison	Buick	198	1	+2 laps
13	17	Lennie Pond	Chevrolet	198	0	+2 laps
14	15	Ricky Rudd	Ford	197	0	+3 laps
15	90	Ken Schrader	Ford	197	0	+3 laps
16	64	Clark Dwyer	Ford	195	0	+5 laps
17	6	Eddie Bierschwale	Chevrolet	195	0	+5 laps
18	67	Buddy Arrington	Ford	195	0	+5 laps
19	51	Doug Heveron	Ford	194	0	+6 laps
20	49	Trevor Boys	Chevrolet	193	0	+7 laps

== Standings after the race ==
Pos	Driver	Points	Differential
1	Bill Elliott	2486	0
2	Darrell Waltrip	2375	-111
3 ▲	Geoffrey Bodine	2286	-200
4 ▲	Neil Bonnett	2240	-246
5	Ricky Rudd	2231	-255
6 ▼	Terry Labonte	2223	-263
7	Kyle Petty	2197	-289
8 ▲	Harry Gant	2184	-302
9 ▼	Bobby Allison	2180	-306
10	Lake Speed	1983	-503

Preceded by 1985 Pepsi Firecracker 400	NASCAR Winston Cup Series Season; 1985	Succeeded by 1985 Talladega 500
