= 2001 New Hampshire 300 =

Race 36 of the 2001 NASCAR Winston Cup Series

Race details
- Race 36 of 36 in the 2001 NASCAR Winston Cup Series
- The 2001 New Hampshire 300 program cover, with the cover advertising its original scheduled date of September 16.
- Date: November 23, 2001
- Official name: New Hampshire 300
- Location: New Hampshire Motor Speedway
- Course: Permanent racing facility
- Course length: 1.058 miles (1.703 km)
- Distance: 300 laps, 317.4 mi (510.806 km)
- Weather: Cold with temperatures approaching 51.1 °F (10.6 °C); wind speeds up to 5.1 miles per hour (8.2 km/h)
- Average speed: 127.48 miles per hour (205.16 km/h)

Pole position
Driver	Jeff Gordon	Hendrick Motorsports
- Time: 2001 Owner Points as of Richmond

Most laps led
Driver	Jeff Gordon	Hendrick Motorsports
- Laps: 257

Winner
No. 31	Robby Gordon	Richard Childress Racing

Television in the United States
- Network: NBC
- Announcers: Allen Bestwick; Benny Parsons; Wally Dallenbach

The 2001 New Hampshire 300 was a NASCAR Winston Cup race held at New Hampshire Motor Speedway. Originally scheduled to be run on September 16, 2001, the September 11 attacks forced a postponement of the race until November 23, 2001. Thus, the race served as the final event of the 2001 NASCAR Winston Cup Series season.

The race was won by Robby Gordon, driving the #31 Chevrolet for Richard Childress Racing. It was his first of three victories in the Cup Series and was the only one of the three that did not take place on a road course.

== Background ==
The 9/11 attacks left the sports world in somewhat of disarray and NASCAR was no exception. The major issue that the Winston Cup Series had was that their last scheduled off week had been the week between the Dodge/Save Mart 350 at Sears Point at the end of June at the Pepsi 400 at Daytona in early July. There were no other open dates scheduled between then and the final race, the NAPA 500 in Atlanta, so NASCAR had two options: either cancel the New Hampshire 300 outright or extend the season by one week and finish it in Loudon instead of Atlanta.

NASCAR opted for the latter and rescheduled the New Hampshire 300 for the week after the NAPA 500, which resulted in the race being held on Thanksgiving weekend. The series' tire supplier, Goodyear, were tasked with coming up with a racing tire that could hold up against potentially hazardous conditions; the weather in New England, especially in New Hampshire, is significantly different in autumn than it is during the summer months when NASCAR typically visits Loudon and the possibility of the race being disrupted by wintry conditions and snow would have to be considered.

With this in mind, NASCAR tenatively scheduled the New Hampshire 300 for Black Friday, November 23, 2001, the day after Thanksgiving; this allowed for two days of leeway in case the weather would cause a postponement. In the end, weather did not play a factor—in fact, the conditions at Loudon that day were unseasonably mild and the race went off as planned. Still, this was the latest date that a Cup Series season had ended since 1974, when the final points race was run on November 24 of that year.

== Practice results ==
Pos	No.	Driver	Team	Manufacturer	Time	Speed
1	20	Tony Stewart	Joe Gibbs Racing	Pontiac	29.223	130.336
2	6	Mark Martin	Roush Racing	Ford	29.293	130.024
3	99	Jeff Burton	Roush Racing	Ford	29.342	129.807
Official practice results

== Qualifying ==
NASCAR did not conduct qualifying for the race. Instead, the field was set by the points standings following the Chevrolet Monte Carlo 400 at Richmond, which was the race run the week before the originally scheduled New Hampshire 300; this meant that the top 43 teams in the standings would receive spots in the race.

Jeff Gordon, driving the #24 Chevrolet for Hendrick Motorsports, was set as the pole sitter as he had been leading the points following the Richmond race and would eventually win the Winston Cup. Ricky Rudd, driving the #28 Ford for Robert Yates Racing and having won the Richmond event, was on the outside of the front row as he had been second in the points behind Gordon at the time. 42 drivers would start the race, with the last row occupied by Kyle Petty in the #45 Dodge and Buckshot Jones in the #44 Dodge, both driving for Petty Enterprises.

Four additional cars were originally entered for the race when it was originally scheduled for September, but since qualifying was not run, Morgan Shepherd's #89 Ford and Hermie Sadler's #13 Chevrolet did not return to Loudon for the fall race. The other two cars were from disbanded teams. One of them, PPI Motorsports, who fielded the #32 Ford for Ricky Craven in this race, had begun the season with a second car, the #96 driven by Andy Houston and sponsored by McDonald's; due to Houston's struggles to qualify and run well, McDonald’s pulled its sponsorship from the team after the Protection One 400 at Kansas Speedway and PPI opted to shutter the team after sponsorship could not be found. The other was the #27 Pontiac fielded by Eel River Racing, which at the time of the postponement was sponsored by Duke's Mayonnaise and C.F. Sauer and had been driven by several drivers over the course of the year. The team was 43rd in the points after Richmond, by which point Rick Mast had been driving for the team, and would have earned the final spot in the starting lineup. However, Duke's left the team after agreeing to sponsor Donlavey Racing's #90 Ford in 2002 after they lost Hills Bros. Coffee as a sponsor; shortly thereafter, Eel River Racing shut down and Mast moved over to drive the #90 (which was originally entered with Hut Stricklin as the driver; Stricklin and the sponsor moved to Bill Davis Racing).

=== Starting Lineup ===
Pos	No.	Driver	Team	Manufacturer
1	24	Jeff Gordon	Hendrick Motorsports	Chevrolet
2	28	Ricky Rudd	Robert Yates Racing	Ford
3	88	Dale Jarrett	Robert Yates Racing	Ford
4	29	Kevin Harvick (R)	Richard Childress Racing	Chevrolet
5	20	Tony Stewart	Joe Gibbs Racing	Pontiac
6	40	Sterling Marlin	Chip Ganassi Racing	Dodge
7	18	Bobby Labonte	Joe Gibbs Racing	Pontiac
8	8	Dale Earnhardt Jr.	Dale Earnhardt, Inc.	Chevrolet
9	2	Rusty Wallace	Penske Racing South	Ford
10	10	Johnny Benson Jr.	MBV Motorsports	Pontiac
11	1	Kenny Wallace	Dale Earnhardt, Inc.	Chevrolet
12	99	Jeff Burton	Roush Racing	Ford
13	6	Mark Martin	Roush Racing	Ford
14	9	Bill Elliott	Evernham Motorsports	Dodge
15	26	Jimmy Spencer	Haas-Carter Motorsports	Ford
16	17	Matt Kenseth	Roush Racing	Ford
17	22	Ward Burton	Bill Davis Racing	Dodge
18	21	Elliott Sadler	Wood Brothers Racing	Ford
19	55	Bobby Hamilton	Andy Petree Racing	Chevrolet
20	36	Ken Schrader	MBV Motorsports	Pontiac
21	77	Robert Pressley	Jasper Motorsports	Ford
22	12	Mike Wallace	Penske Racing South	Ford
23	25	Jerry Nadeau	Hendrick Motorsports	Chevrolet
24	32	Ricky Craven	PPI Motorsports	Ford
25	93	Dave Blaney	Bill Davis Racing	Dodge
26	5	Terry Labonte	Hendrick Motorsports	Chevrolet
27	97	Kurt Busch (R)	Roush Racing	Ford
28	33	Joe Nemechek	Andy Petree Racing	Chevrolet
29	15	Michael Waltrip	Dale Earnhardt, Inc.	Chevrolet
30	43	John Andretti	Petty Enterprises	Dodge
31	31	Robby Gordon	Richard Childress Racing	Chevrolet
32	19	Casey Atwood (R)	Evernham Motorsports	Dodge
33	11	Brett Bodine	Brett Bodine Racing	Ford
34	66	Todd Bodine	Haas-Carter Motorsports	Ford
35	01	Jason Leffler (R)	Chip Ganassi Racing	Dodge
36	7	Kevin Lepage	Ultra Motorsports	Ford
37	92	Stacy Compton	Melling Racing	Dodge
38	4	Bobby Hamilton Jr.	Morgan-McClure Motorsports	Chevrolet
39	14	Ron Hornaday Jr. (R)	A.J. Foyt Racing	Pontiac
40	90	Rick Mast	Donlavey Racing	Ford
41	44	Buckshot Jones	Petty Enterprises	Dodge
42	45	Kyle Petty	Petty Enterprises	Dodge

== Results ==
The race saw Robby Gordon, driving the No. 31 Chevrolet for Richard Childress Racing, pick up his first career win.

However, it was a controversial win, as he and Jeff Gordon, who had been up front all day, were facing each other, made contact with 16 laps to go. This would put Robby in the lead during the final caution of the race. Jeff would retaliate under yellow and be black flagged. This did not affect Jeff's title hopes, as he had already clinched the title at Atlanta Motor Speedway the week before.

Pos	Grid	No	Driver	Team	Manufacturer	Laps	Points
1	31	31	Robby Gordon	Richard Childress Racing	Chevrolet	300	180
2	6	40	Sterling Marlin	Chip Ganassi Racing	Dodge	300	175
3	7	18	Bobby Labonte	Joe Gibbs Racing	Pontiac	300	170
4	16	17	Matt Kenseth	Roush Racing	Ford	300	160
5	5	20	Tony Stewart	Joe Gibbs Racing	Pontiac	300	155
6	23	25	Jerry Nadeau	Hendrick Motorsports	Chevrolet	300	150
7	21	77	Robert Pressley	Jasper Motorsports	Ford	300	146
8	33	11	Brett Bodine	Brett Bodine Racing	Ford	300	142
9	13	6	Mark Martin	Roush Racing	Ford	300	138
10	3	88	Dale Jarrett	Robert Yates Racing	Ford	300	134
11	25	93	Dave Blaney	Bill Davis Racing	Dodge	300	130
12	10	10	Johnny Benson Jr.	MBV Motorsports	Pontiac	299	127
13	2	28	Ricky Rudd	Robert Yates Racing	Ford	299	124
14	15	26	Jimmy Spencer	Haas-Carter Motorsports	Ford	299	121
15	1	24	Jeff Gordon	Hendrick Motorsports	Chevrolet	299	128
16	32	19	Casey Atwood (R)	Evernham Motorsports	Dodge	299	115
17	12	99	Jeff Burton	Roush Racing	Ford	298	112
18	9	2	Rusty Wallace	Penske Racing South	Ford	298	109
19	18	21	Elliott Sadler	Wood Brothers Racing	Ford	298	106
20	28	33	Joe Nemechek	Andy Petree Racing	Chevrolet	298	103
21	27	97	Kurt Busch (R)	Roush Racing	Ford	298	100
22	14	9	Bill Elliott	Evernham Motorsports	Dodge	298	97
23	42	45	Kyle Petty	Petty Enterprises	Dodge	297	94
24	8	8	Dale Earnhardt Jr.	Dale Earnhardt, Inc.	Chevrolet	297	91
25	11	1	Kenny Wallace	Dale Earnhardt, Inc.	Chevrolet	297	88
26	4	29	Kevin Harvick (R)	Richard Childress Racing	Chevrolet	297	90
27	26	5	Terry Labonte	Hendrick Motorsports	Chevrolet	297	82
28	40	90	Rick Mast	Donlavey Racing	Ford	297	79
29	19	55	Bobby Hamilton	Andy Petree Racing	Chevrolet	297	76
30	35	01	Jason Leffler (R)	Chip Ganassi Racing	Dodge	296	73
31	34	66	Todd Bodine	Haas-Carter Motorsports	Ford	296	70
32	39	14	Ron Hornaday Jr. (R)	A.J. Foyt Racing	Pontiac	296	67
33	22	12	Mike Wallace	Penske Racing South	Ford	295	64
34	37	92	Stacy Compton	Melling Racing	Dodge	295	61
35	36	7	Kevin Lepage	Ultra Motorsports	Ford	295	58
36	30	43	John Andretti	Petty Enterprises	Dodge	295	55
37	38	4	Bobby Hamilton Jr.	Morgan-McClure Motorsports	Chevrolet	294	52
38	24	32	Ricky Craven	PPI Motorsports	Ford	268	49
39	20	36	Ken Schrader	MBV Motorsports	Pontiac	261	46
40	29	15	Michael Waltrip	Dale Earnhardt, Inc.	Chevrolet	246	43
41	41	44	Buckshot Jones	Petty Enterprises	Dodge	138	40
42	17	22	Ward Burton	Bill Davis Racing	Dodge	129	37
Official race results

== Standings after the race ==
Pos	Driver	Points
1	Jeff Gordon	5112
2	Tony Stewart	4768
3	Sterling Marlin	4710
4	Ricky Rudd	4706
5	Dale Jarrett	4612
6	Bobby Labonte	4561
7	Rusty Wallace	4481
8	Dale Earnhardt Jr.	4460
9	Kevin Harvick	4406
10	Jeff Burton	4394
