= Bahari Racing =

NASCAR race team

Eel River Racing
- Owner(s): Dick Bahre, Lowrance Harry, Chuck Rider (Bahari); Jack Birmingham (Eel River)
- Series: Winston Cup Series; Busch Series
- Race drivers: Geoff Bodine; Michael Waltrip; Johnny Benson Jr.; Kenny Wallace; Jeff Fuller; Rick Mast; Mike Bliss
- Manufacturer: Pontiac
- Opened: 1981 (Bahari); 1999 (Eel River)
- Closed: 1999 (Bahari); 2001 (Eel River)

Career
- Debut: 1981 Daytona 500 (Daytona) (Bahari); 1999 NAPA Autocare 500 (Martinsville) (Eel River)
- Latest race: 1999 Checker Auto Parts 500 (Phoenix) (Bahari); 2001 Chevrolet Monte Carlo 400 (Richmond) (Eel River)
- Races competed: Bahari: 426 (Cup); 81 (Busch); Eel River: 58 (Eel River)
- Drivers' Championships: 0
- Race victories: 0
- Pole positions: 5 (Bahari)

Bahari Racing was a NASCAR Winston Cup and Busch team that operated from 1981 to 2001.The Busch team ran from 1989-1996 with Ronnie Sliver and Michael Waltrip driving, and one race with Johnny Benson at Homestead. The team's history of drivers include Geoff Bodine, Michael Waltrip, Johnny Benson, Kenny Wallace, Jeff Fuller, Rick Mast, and Mike Bliss, among others. The team mainly ran Pontiac Grand Prixs, although they did run other manufacturers as well. The team was also known as Bahre Racing and Bahari Racing prior to its purchase by Jack Birmingham in 1999, who renamed the team Eel River Racing. It was under that name that the team ceased operating in 2001.

== Team history ==
=== Beginnings ===
The team originally started as the Bahre Racing No. 23 Pontiac owned by Dick Bahre in 1981. The team ran part-time until 1986. Chuck Rider entered the fold in 1987. The team at that point was renamed Bahari Racing, using the first two letters of each of the three principal owners' surnames (Dick BAhre, Lowrance HArry, & Chuck RIder). Waltrip, who ran a few races in late 1985 for the team, ran for Rookie of the Year in 1986 in a car sponsored by Hawaiian Punch.

1987 saw the team switch numbers from 23 to 30 and manufacturers from Pontiac to Chevrolet. Hawaiian Punch left the team, resulting in a revolving door of sponsors before All Pro Auto Parts came on for the rest of the season.

1988 saw the team switch back to Pontiac and acquire sponsorship from Country Time Lemonade. Waltrip then proceeded to miss the field for the 1988 Daytona 500. The team bought the Mueller Brothers' No. 89 entry and ran that car in the race to a 22nd-place finish. The June race at Pocono saw Waltrip bring the No. 30 home in second place, in addition to two other top-ten finishes that season. 1989 saw an additional five top-tens for the team, while 1990 (which saw Maxwell House join the team as a co-sponsor to Country Time) saw Waltrip pick up five top-fives and five more top-tens in addition. However, at the end of the season, both Country Time and Maxwell House left the No. 30 for full-time sponsorships on other cars (the No. 68 for Tri-Star Motorsports and the new No. 22 for Junior Johnson Motorsports, respectively).

=== The Pennzoil Years ===
1991 saw Pennzoil brought in as the new sponsor for the team, and Waltrip responded with his best season to that point. The No. 30 won poles at Dover and Michigan in June, the team's first two poles. Waltrip also earned four top-fives and 12 top-tens for the team on his way to a 15th-place finish in points.

1992 began with Waltrip as one of three cars that had a chance to win the Daytona 500, but a blown engine in the last ten laps relegated him to a disappointing 18th. The rest of the year was disappointing as well, dropping to 23rd in points and recording a fourth at Rockingham as his best finish of the year.

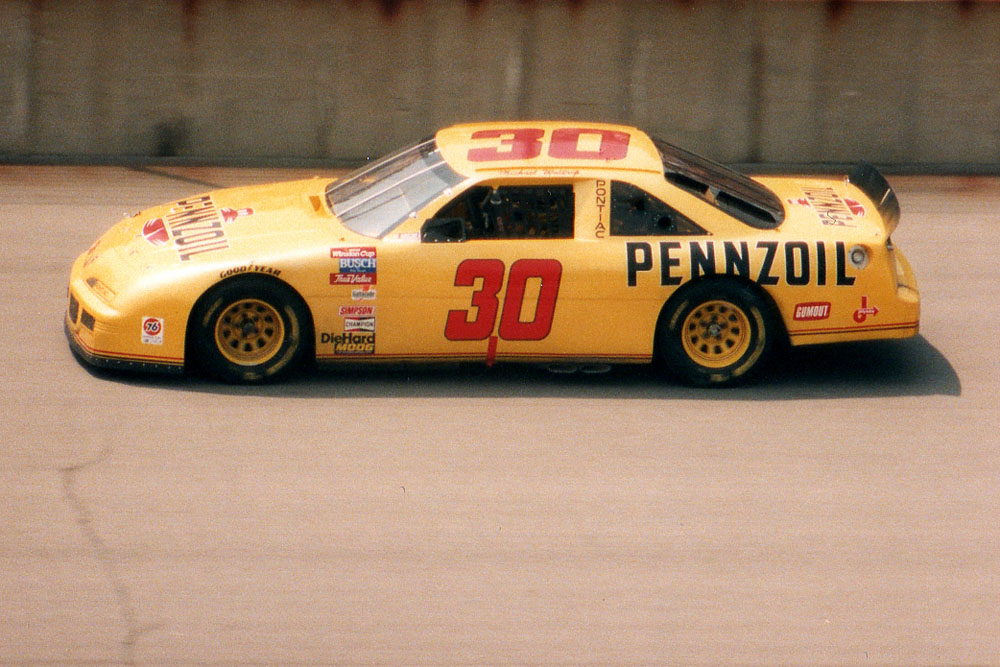
Michael Waltrip driving for Bahari Racing in 1994.

1994 and 1995 were, based on the points standings, Michael Waltrip's two best seasons in the Cup series. Waltrip drove the No. 30 to 12th in points (best among the Pontiacs) both years with nearly identical results. However, after the season, Waltrip left the team to drive the No. 21 for the Wood Brothers.

For 1996, the team hired Johnny Benson, the 1995 Busch Series Champion to take over the No. 30. Benson won the pole for the Purolator 500 at Atlanta in March, but struggled early on, even failing to qualify for the Food City 500 at Bristol. Later on in the season, Benson's performances improved. Benson had the lead late at Richmond in September before fading to tenth. Benson ended the year 21st in points with a best finish of fifth at Pocono in July, in addition to winning the Rookie of the Year award.

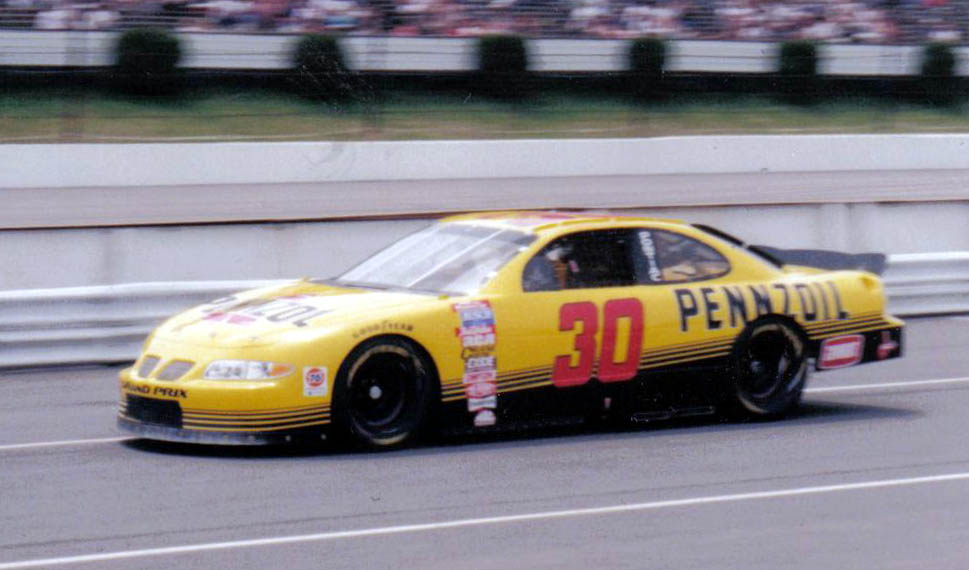
Bahari Racing's car for 1997, driven by Johnny Benson Jr.

1997 was the team's best season in the Winston Cup Series. Benson finished 11th in points, just one point behind tenth place Ken Schrader. During the season, Benson won the pole at Michigan and had 8 top-10 finishes. However, Benson left the team to drive the new No. 26 for Roush Racing at the end of the season and Pennzoil left to sponsor the new No. 1 for Dale Earnhardt Inc.

=== Decline ===
For 1998, Derrike Cope was brought in to replace Benson behind the wheel. Gumout, a division of Pennzoil, provided the sponsorship for the team. However, the season was a big letdown. The team failed to score a top-ten finish for the first time since 1986 and failed to qualify for four races. Cope also missed Martinsville due to injury and was replaced briefly by Jeff Green. The high point for the team was the pole Cope won at Charlotte in October. The best finish for the No. 30 was an 11th at Talladega. In addition, the team fell all the way from 11th in 1997 to 40th in the owners' points standings. Gumout left the team at the end of the season.

1999 saw the team acquire sponsorship from the Sara Lee Corporation. Primary sponsorship would be split between four divisions- Jimmy Dean Sausages, Bryan Meats, State Fair Corn Dogs, and Rudy's Farm. Each division had its own paint scheme.

The season was a complete disaster. Cope failed to qualify for half of the first 22 races before the team was sold to Jack Birmingham and renamed Eel River Racing. He renamed it to Eel River Racing because of his native Massachusetts roots where the Eel River is in Plymouth, where Birmingham is from. Birmingham fired Cope and replaced him with Todd Bodine. Mike Bliss also ran two races in the No. 30 before the end of the season.

=== Eel River Racing ===
In 2000, the car number was changed from No. 30 to No. 27, and after Birmingham's purchase of the team, the team's best finish was a ninth-place run at Talladega on October 15, 2000 with Bliss. The team's only full season was in 2000, when Fuller and Bliss raced for the team. That year the team had 10 DNFs, and would struggle to reach the top-40 in points. After a long season, the team would end up 38th in driver's points.

After running the previous two seasons with sponsorship from Pfizer and its Viagra brand, Eel River Racing began the 2001 season with Kenny Wallace driving a largely unsponsored car. After running with one-off sponsorships for most of the early season races, the team eventually was able to secure sponsorship from C.F. Sauer, who joined the team for the Coca-Cola 600. The No. 27 was painted yellow and carried the logo of Sauer's Duke's Mayonnaise division.

=== Demise ===
The team failed to qualify for a race again until the Pennsylvania 500. Wallace had departed after missing the field at Sonoma, replaced by a returning Mike Bliss. Bliss failed to qualify at all and was replaced by Rick Mast at Pocono. After missing the Brickyard 400, Mast qualified for the next five races after that, ending with the Chevrolet Monte Carlo 400. Mast attempted to qualify for the remaining races in September, through the inaugural Winston Cup race at Kansas, but did not qualify there or at Dover (New Hampshire was postponed to November due to the September 11 attacks in New York). Sauer's and Mast left to prepared for the 2002 with Donlavey Racing, leaving Birmingham with no sponsor, no driver, and no choice but to suspend operations. The team officially closed their doors on October 2, 2001, 2 days after the race at Kansas.

== Team Results ==
=== Car No. 27 results ===
Year	Driver	No.	Make	1	2	3	4	5	6	7	8	9	10	11	12	13	14	15	16	17	18	19	20	21	22	23	24	25	26	27	28	29	30	31	32	33	34	35	36	Owners	Pts
1981	Geoff Bodine	23	Pontiac	RSD	DAY; 22	RCH	CAR	ATL	BRI	NWS	DAR; 30	MAR	TAL	NSV	DOV	CLT	TWS	RSD	MCH	DAY	NSV	POC	TAL	MCH	BRI	DAR	RCH	DOV	MAR	NWS										49th	210
1981	Charlie Glotzbach	23	Buick																												CLT; 26	CAR	ATL	RSD						49th	210
1982	Geoff Bodine	23	Buick	DAY; 42	RCH	BRI	ATL	CAR	DAR	NWS	MAR	TAL; 29	NSV	DOV	CLT	POC	RSD	MCH	DAY	NSV	POC	TAL	MCH	BRI	DAR	RCH	DOV	NWS	CLT	MAR	CAR	ATL	RSD							79th	37
1983	Elliott Forbes-Robinson	23	Buick	DAY; 40	RCH	CAR	ATL	DAR	NWS	MAR	TAL	NSV	DOV	BRI	CLT	RSD	POC	MCH	DAY	NSV	POC	TAL	MCH	BRI	DAR	RCH	DOV	MAR	NWS	CLT	CAR	ATL	RSD							81st	43
1984	Sterling Marlin	23	Buick	DAY	RCH	CAR; 35																																		44th	874
1984	Don Hume	23	Buick				ATL; 26	BRI	NWS																															44th	874
1984	Morgan Shepherd	23	Buick							DAR; 26	MAR	TAL	NSV	DOV; 36	CLT; 17	RSD	POC	MCH	DAY; 40	NSV																				44th	874
1984	Gene Coyle	23	Buick																		POC; 18	TAL	MCH	BRI			DOV; 21	MAR												44th	874
1984	Connie Saylor	23	Buick																						DAR; 31	RCH			CLT; 34	NWS	CAR	ATL	RSD							44th	874
1985	Morgan Shepherd	23	Chevy	DAY	RCH	CAR; 38	ATL	BRI	DAR																															52nd	308
1985	Dick May	23	Buick							NWS; 25	MAR	TAL	DOV																											52nd	308
1985	Michael Waltrip	23	Pontiac											CLT; 28	RSD	POC					MCH; 18	BRI	DAR; 24	RCH	DOV	MAR	NWS	CLT; 31	CAR	ATL; 39	RSD									52nd	308
1985	Jim Hull	23	Chevy														MCH; 32																							52nd	308
1985	Eldon Dotson	23	Chevy															DAY; 38	POC	TAL																				52nd	308
1986	Michael Waltrip	23	Pontiac	DAY; DNQ	RCH; 25	CAR; 21	ATL; 19		DAR; 13	NWS; 26	MAR; 11	TAL; 35	DOV; 12	CLT; 26	RSD; 25	POC; 39	MCH; 22	DAY; 18	POC; 11	TAL; 14	GLN; 17	MCH; 32	BRI; 13	DAR; 16	RCH; 14	DOV; 16	MAR; 14	NWS; 23	CLT; 19	CAR; 13	ATL; 20	RSD; 31								19th	2853
1986	Michael Waltrip	23	Buick					BRI; 32																																19th	2853
1987	Michael Waltrip	30	Chevy	DAY; 22	CAR; 17	RCH; 12	ATL; 39	DAR; 19	NWS; 24		MAR; 10	TAL; 25	CLT; 11	DOV; 21	POC; 16	RSD; 32	MCH; 39	DAY; 19	POC; 37	TAL; 17	GLN; 16	MCH; 20	BRI; 14	DAR; 19	RCH; 19	DOV; 18	MAR; 18	NWS; 16	CLT; 35	CAR; 19	RSD; 26	ATL; 38								20th	2840
1987	Michael Waltrip	30	Pontiac							BRI; 13																														20th	2840
1988	Michael Waltrip	30	Pontiac	DAY; DNQ	RCH; 31		ATL; 12	DAR; 21	BRI; 12	NWS; 32	MAR; 22	TAL; 33	CLT; 23	DOV; 36	RSD; 11	POC; 2	MCH; 28	DAY; 21	POC; 17	TAL; 20	GLN; 33	MCH; 7	BRI; 31	DAR; 25	RCH; 12	DOV; 12	MAR; 25	CLT; 23	NWS; 25	CAR; 19	PHO; 28	ATL; 7								18th	2949
1988	Michael Waltrip	30	Chevy			CAR; 13																																		18th	2949
1989	Michael Waltrip	30	Pontiac	DAY; 21	CAR; 12	ATL; 20	RCH; 13	DAR; 9	BRI; 11	NWS; 29	MAR; 25	TAL; 21	CLT; 27	DOV; 22	SON; 10	POC; 14	MCH; 16	DAY; 34	POC; 28	TAL; 36	GLN; 10	MCH; 31	BRI; 32	DAR; 13	RCH; 23	DOV; 6	MAR; 12	CLT; 17	NWS; 23	CAR; 17	PHO; 9	ATL; 26								19th	3057
1990	Michael Waltrip	30	Pontiac	DAY; 8	RCH; 27	CAR; 28	ATL; 38	DAR; 9	BRI; 20	NWS; 27	MAR; 8	TAL; 5	CLT; 4	DOV; 26	SON; 9	POC; 19	MCH; 21	DAY; 16	POC; 23	TAL; 21	GLN; 4	MCH; 30	BRI; 9	DAR; 26	RCH; 14	DOV; 5	MAR; 30	NWS; 15	CLT; 3	CAR; 15	PHO; 43	ATL; 14								18th	3251
1991	Michael Waltrip	30	Pontiac	DAY; 38	RCH; 17	CAR; 7	ATL; 5	DAR; 3*	BRI; 23	NWS; 7	MAR; 7	TAL; 5	CLT; 15	DOV; 32	SON; 10	POC; 18	MCH; 34	DAY; 6	POC; 38	TAL; 7	GLN; 21	MCH; 9	BRI; 25	DAR; 27	RCH; 30	DOV; 5	MAR; 25	NWS; 27	CLT; 7	CAR; 19	PHO; 24	ATL; 40								15th	3254
1992	Michael Waltrip	30	Pontiac	DAY; 18	CAR; 4	RCH; 34	ATL; 28	DAR; 14	BRI; 17	NWS; 29	MAR; 27	TAL; 38	CLT; 25	DOV; 15	SON; 20	POC; 15	MCH; 27	DAY; 27	POC; 26	TAL; 7	GLN; 35	MCH; 22	BRI; 14	DAR; 35	RCH; 33	DOV; 17	MAR; 29	NWS; 16	CLT; 23	CAR; 20	PHO; 11	ATL; 14								23rd	2825
1993	Michael Waltrip	30	Pontiac	DAY; 16	CAR; 26	RCH; 23	ATL; 14	DAR; 33	BRI; 14	NWS; 20	MAR; 16	TAL; 10	SON; 23	CLT; 13	DOV; 27	POC; 21	MCH; 37	DAY; 22	NHA; 23	POC; 14	TAL; 20	GLN; 12	MCH; 16	BRI; 10	DAR; 13	RCH; 19	DOV; 23	MAR; 8	NWS; 14	CLT; 27	CAR; 18	PHO; 9	ATL; 6							17th	3291
1994	Michael Waltrip	30	Pontiac	DAY; 31	CAR; 10	RCH; 31	ATL; 23	DAR; 15	BRI; 5	NWS; 11	MAR; 17	TAL; 3	SON; 16	CLT; 10	DOV; 7	POC; 11	MCH; 8	DAY; 13	NHA; 37	POC; 14	TAL; 11	IND; 8	GLN; 20	MCH; 14	BRI; 7	DAR; 31	RCH; 26	DOV; 33	MAR; 19	NWS; 21	CLT; 10	CAR; 26	PHO; 36	ATL; 10						13th	3512
1995	Michael Waltrip	30	Pontiac	DAY; 6	CAR; 17	RCH; 23	ATL; 35	DAR; 7	BRI; 22	NWS; 22	MAR; 15	TAL; 12	SON; 10	CLT; 3	DOV; 8	POC; 9	MCH; 12	DAY; 15	NHA; 14	POC; 21	TAL; 9	IND; 14	GLN; 14	MCH; 11	BRI; 15	DAR; 5	RCH; 28	DOV; 29	MAR; 25	NWS; 12	CLT; 17	CAR; 38	PHO; 34	ATL; 12						12th	3601
1996	Johnny Benson	30	Pontiac	DAY; 23	CAR; 20	RCH; 37	ATL; 38	DAR; 24	BRI; DNQ	NWS; 24	MAR; 25	TAL; 10	SON; 18	CLT; 38	DOV; 17	POC; 25	MCH; 37	DAY; 25	NHA; 9	POC; 5	TAL; 18	IND; 8*	GLN; 15	MCH; 7	BRI; 28	DAR; 11	RCH; 10	DOV; 24	MAR; 17	NWS; 17	CLT; 14	CAR; 40	PHO; 32	ATL; 27						21st	3004
1997	Johnny Benson	30	Pontiac	DAY; 28	CAR; 27	RCH; 9	ATL; 11	DAR; 10	TEX; 28	BRI; 31	MAR; 17	SON; 21	TAL; 9	CLT; 15	DOV; 21	POC; 27	MCH; 10	CAL; 13	DAY; 16	NHA; 18	POC; 13	IND; 7	GLN; 11	MCH; 24	BRI; 18	DAR; 19	RCH; 13	NHA; 19	DOV; 28	MAR; 19	CLT; 10	TAL; 19	CAR; 36	PHO; 7	ATL; 10					11th	3575
1998	Derrike Cope	30	Pontiac	DAY; 37	CAR; 15	LVS; 31	ATL; 38	DAR; 40	BRI; 26	TEX; DNQ		TAL; 22	CAL; 39	CLT; 33	DOV; 35	RCH; 34	MCH; DNQ	POC; 26	SON; 38	NHA; 16	POC; 23	IND; DNQ	GLN; 39	MCH; 43	BRI; 36	NHA; DNQ	DAR; 27	RCH; 24	DOV; 35	MAR; 30	CLT; 14	TAL; 11	DAY; 38	PHO; 33	CAR; 25	ATL; 30				37th	2065
1998	Jeff Green	30	Pontiac								MAR; 17																													37th	2065
1999	Derrike Cope	30	Pontiac	DAY; 18	CAR; DNQ	LVS; 34	ATL; 41	DAR; DNQ	TEX; 22	BRI; DNQ	MAR; 34	TAL; DNQ	CAL; 42	RCH; 42	CLT; DNQ	DOV; 36	MCH; 32	POC; DNQ	SON; 37	DAY; DNQ	NHA; DNQ	POC; DNQ	IND; 32	GLN; DNQ	MCH; DNQ															44th	1678
1999	Todd Bodine	30	Pontiac																							BRI; 15	DAR; DNQ	RCH; 19	NHA; 39	DOV; DNQ		CLT; 36			PHO; 25	HOM; 27	ATL; 43			44th	1678
1999	Mike Bliss	30	Pontiac																												MAR; 32			CAR; 42						44th	1678
1999	Buckshot Jones	30	Pontiac																														TAL; 27							44th	1678
2000	Jeff Fuller	27	Pontiac	DAY; DNQ	CAR; 42	LVS; 36	ATL; 22	DAR; 36	BRI; 37	TEX; 38																														36th	2048
2000	Mike Bliss	27	Pontiac								MAR; 35	TAL; 24	CAL; 35	RCH; 41	CLT; 32	DOV; 35	MCH; 37	POC; 33	SON; 22	DAY; 28	NHA; 32	POC; 24	IND; 31	GLN; 39	MCH; 28	BRI; DNQ	DAR; 28	RCH; DNQ	NHA; 19	DOV; 43	MAR; 28	CLT; 43	TAL; 9	CAR; 21	PHO; 38	HOM; 40	ATL; DNQ			36th	2048
2001	Kenny Wallace	27	Pontiac	DAY; 25	CAR; 42	LVS; 31	ATL; 29	DAR; 31	BRI; 38	TEX; 25	MAR; 37	TAL; DNQ	CAL; 37	RCH; 40	CLT; 40	DOV; 27	MCH; DNQ	POC; DNQ	SON; DNQ																					42nd	1782
2001	Mike Bliss	27	Pontiac																	DAY; DNQ	CHI; DNQ	NHA; DNQ																		42nd	1782
2001	Rick Mast	27	Pontiac																				POC; 35	IND; DNQ	GLN; 27	MCH; 39	BRI; 41	DAR; 30	RCH; 34	DOV; DNQ	KAN; DNQ	CLT	MAR	TAL	PHO	CAR	HOM	ATL	NHA	42nd	1782
