= Donlavey Racing =

Former American stock car team

- Owner: Junie Donlavey
- Base: Richmond, Virginia
- Series: Winston Cup
- Race drivers: Ken Schrader; Jody Ridley; Ernie Irvan; Dick Trickle; Bobby Hillin
- Manufacturer: Oldsmobile; Hudson; Chevrolet; Mercury; Ford
- Opened: 1950
- Closed: 2005

Career
- Debut: 1950 Unnamed/Unknown (Martinsville)
- Latest race: 2002 UAW-GM Quality 500 (Charlotte)
- Races competed: 863
- Drivers' Championships: 0
- Race victories: 1
- Pole positions: 2

Donlavey Racing was a stock car racing team that competed from 1950 until 2004 in the NASCAR Winston Cup Series. It was owned by Junie Donlavey and ran a total of 863 races in NASCAR. Donlavey Racing used a number of makes and numbers, but for years was best known for the No. 90 Ford. Though the team only had one points win (1981 Mason-Dixon 500 with Jody Ridley) and two pole positions in its long history, three of Donlavey's drivers won Rookie of the Year honors (Bill Dennis in 1970, Ridley in 1980, Ken Schrader in 1985) and a number of former and future NASCAR race winners drove for the team. Sixty-seven different drivers ran at least one race for Donlavey.

== 1950s–1960s ==
Donlavey made his debut as an owner in 1950 at Martinsville Speedway, where Runt Harris drove Donlavey's Oldsmobile to a nineteenth-place finish after suffering mechanical failures. Donlavey's next race as an owner came in 1952 Southern 500, fielding the No. 53 Hudson Hornet for Joe Weatherly. He started 38th and finished 16th. He did not field a car again until 1957, when Emanuel Zervakis drove Donlavey's No. 90 Ford at Raleigh Speedway, finishing 24th. Zervakis ran two more races for Donlavey that year, at Langhorne Speedway and Martinsville, finishing 26th and 22nd respectively. Harris ran another race for Donlavey as well, finishing 39th at the Southern 500. Zervakis returned to run Donlavey's Chevys the next season, but did not finish a race all season. Donlavey only ran one race in 1959, at the Capital City 200. Harris had a fifth-place finish in that race.

Harris ran three more races for Donlavey the following season, but struggled with mechanical problems, and could only manage a best finish of 30th. Speedy Thompson took over for three races, his best finish being a 12th at the Dixie 300. Tiny Lund drove for Donlavey at the Atlanta 500, but finished 36th after suffering engine failure early in the race. Johnny Roberts drove one race for Donlavey in 1961, finishing 21st at Richmond after suffering a blown head gasket.

Donlavey did not field a car until 1965, when Sonny Hutchins took over the ride. Making ten starts, he had a fifth-place run at Moyock, and a tenth at Martinsville. After going 1966 without a top-ten, Hutchins came back in 1967, and had two top ten finishes. He finished 34th in points. He made four starts in 1968, but they all ended in DNFs. He made eight starts in 1969, and had two second-place finishes, at Dover and Richmond, respectively.

== 1970s ==
Hutchins returned in 1970, and had a fifth-place at Richmond, but was soon removed from the ride. LeeRoy Yarbrough drove for Donlavey in one race at Trenton Speedway, but his engine expired several laps into the race. Bill Dennis finished the year with Donlavey. Dennis would run with Donlavey in his first full season the next year. He had ten top-tens, one pole position, and finished eighteenth in points. Dennis started 1972, with a fifth at Richmond, but resigned after that race. Max Berrier, Butch Hartman, Bobby Isaac, David Pearson, Johnny Rutherford and Fred Lorenzen were among those who shared the ride for the rest of the year. Donlavey also fielded a second car for the first time in his career, when he fielded the No. 98 at Martinsville for Isaac, who finished 35th as a teammate to Jimmy Hensley, and again two races later at the National 500 for Richard D. Brown, who finished 41st.

In 1973, Donlavey secured his first full-time sponsor, signing Truxmore Industries. Dick Brooks began the year with Donlavey, and ran part of his season with him. Other drivers included Harry Gant, Charlie Glotzbach, Ray Hendrick, and a one-off with Yvon Duhamel. He also fielded the 98 for Brooks and Richie Panch. Then next season, Dennis returned for three races, before being replaced by multiple drivers. Glotzbach ran eleven races with him, the most by any driver that year. In 1975, Donlavey decided to run full-time, and hired Brooks as driver. Brooks ran 25 races, had six top-fives and finished 10th in points. Donlavey also fielded a second car, the No. 93, for Kenny Brightbill, Dick May, Earl Ross, and Jody Ridley.

In 1976, Brooks had eighteen top-ten finishes and finished tenth in points again. The No. 93 ran in two races for Buck Baker and Gene Felton, with Donlavey also fielding the No. 99 for Dick Trickle at Charlotte Motor Speedway. The team also entered their No. 90 Ford Torino at the 1976 24 Hours of Le Mans for drivers Dick Brooks, Dick Hutcherson, and French driver Marcel Mignot, but DNF'd with transmission failure after 11 hours.

The next season, Brooks finished sixth in points, with Donlavey fielding the No. 93 for Belgian racer Christine Beckers. She finished 37th. Brooks began 1978 by finishing fifth in two out of the first three races of the season, but despite an eighth-place points finish, Brooks departed the team.

== 1980s ==
In 1979, Donlavey signed Ricky Rudd to drive the No. 90. Competing in 28 races, Rudd had 17 top-ten finishes and finished 9th in points. Donlavey also fielded the No. 77 Sunny King Mercury for Jody Ridley, who had two top-tens in three races. After Rudd left at the end of the season, Ridley signed to drive the 90 for the full season. He had eighteen top-ten finishes, finished seventh in points, and was named Rookie of the Year. The next season, he finished fifth in points and won the Mason-Dixon 500, the only points win Donlavey would have during his career. After losing the Truxmore sponsorship, J. D. Stacy sponsored the car in 1982, but after he failed to post a top-five, Ridley left the team.

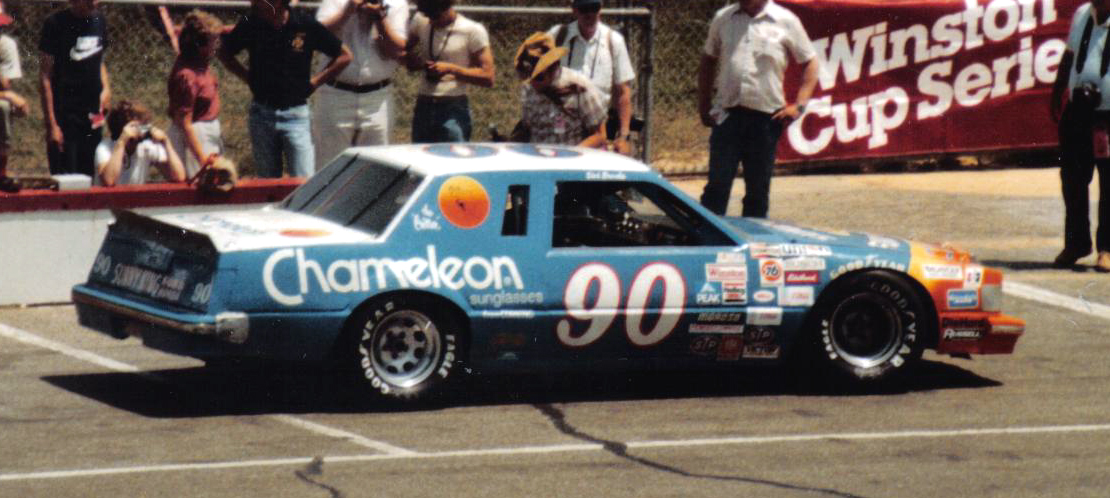
1983 racecar

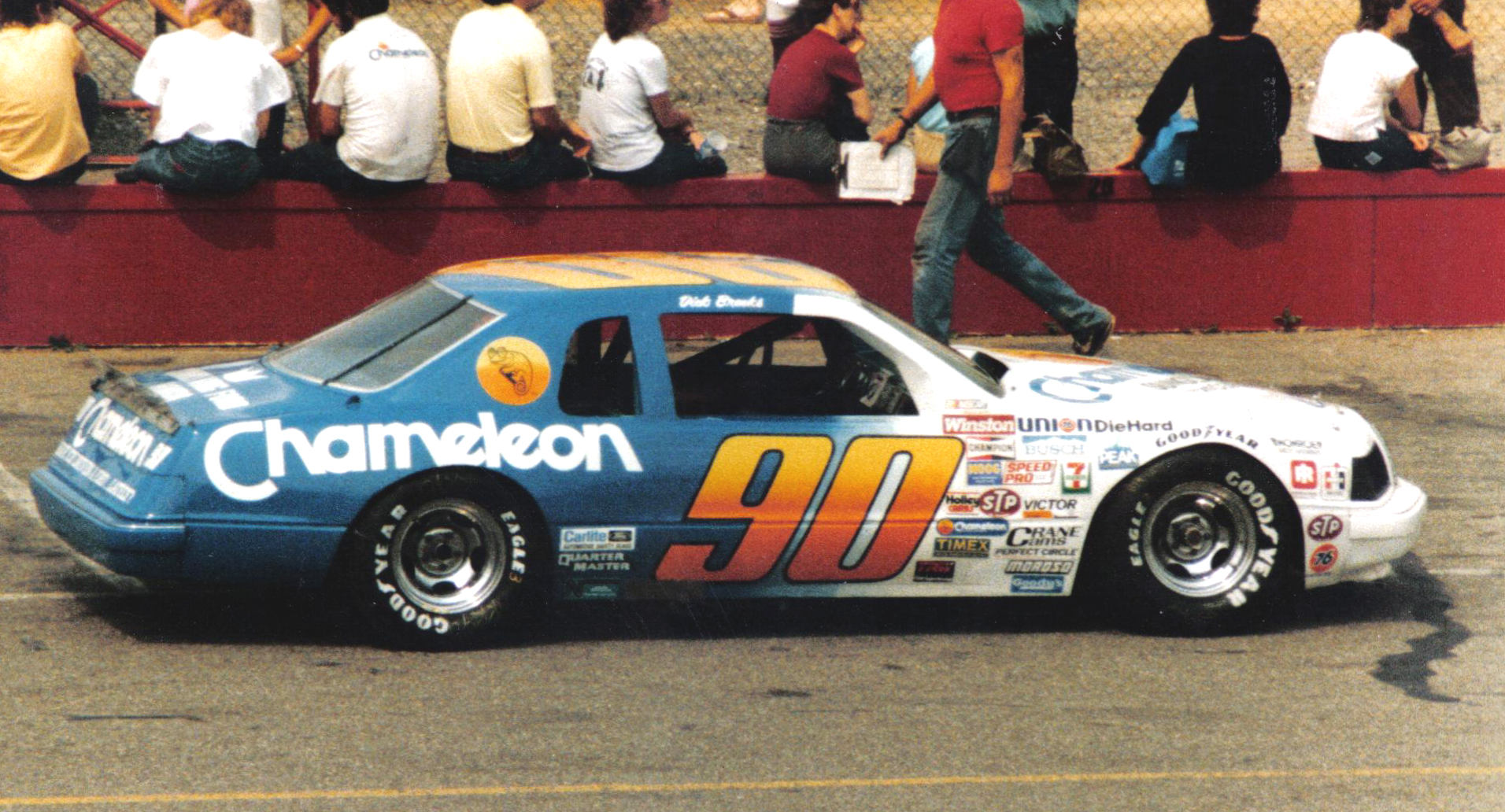
1984 racecar

Brooks returned to the team, where he posted two top-fives and finished 14th in points with sponsorship from Chameleon Sunglasses. After just one top-five in 1984, Brooks departed the team for the final time.

The next season, Donlavey signed rookie driver Ken Schrader to pilot the No. 90, with new sponsorship from Ultra Seal. Schrader had three top-tens and finished sixteenth in points. In 1986, Red Baron Frozen Pizza, signed as primary sponsor, and in 1987, Schrader won one of two qualifying races for the Daytona 500, as well as picking up a pole at Darlington Raceway, finishing tenth in championship points. At the end of the season, Schrader left, and was replaced by Benny Parsons with Bull's Eye Barbecue Sauce. Running what turned out to be his last season, Parsons competed in 27 starts and grabbed an eighth-place finish at Phoenix International Raceway. He was replaced for one race at North Wilkesboro by Jimmy Means, who finished 24th. After the season, Bull's Eye left the team, and Donlavey signed rookie Chad Little to his ride. However, Little struggled and was released after the Coca-Cola 600. Donlavey cut back to part-time schedule for the rest of the season, with Stan Barrett and Lennie Pond running selected races for him.

== 1990s ==
In 1990, Donlavey signed True Cure as sponsor, and at the advice of Schrader, signed Ernie Irvan as driver. Unfortunately, True Cure did not meet their financial expectations, and Donlavey cancelled the contract. Despite the financial setback, Donlavey fielded a second car, the No. 91, at the GM Goodwrench 500 for J. T. Hayes as a teammate to Irvan. After three races, Donlavey granted permission for Irvan to seek other opportunities, and Irvan signed with Morgan-McClure Motorsports. Buddy Baker and Charlie Glotzbach ran nine races between the two of them for the rest of the season. The next season, Donlavey signed Robby Gordon for the first two races of the season. He finished 18th and 26th, respectively. At the Motorcraft Quality Parts 500, Donlavey fielded a car for Wally Dallenbach Jr., who would run eleven races for him that season.

Dorsey Schroeder started off 1992 driving for Donlavey, before Glotzbach took over for two races. Other drivers who raced for Donlavey that year were Glotzbach, Kerry Teague, Pancho Carter, Todd Bodine in a Donlavey Ford renumbered #34 in partnership with Diet Pepsi and Cicci-Welliver Racing for Bodine's first Cup start at Watkins Glen, Bobby Hillin Jr., and Hut Stricklin. Hillin returned to run the full season for Donlavey the next year, with sponsorship from Heilig-Meyers. Hillin posted a best finish was eleventh and he finished twenty-seventh in points. Hillin ran just three races in 1994, before he was replaced by Mike Wallace. Wallace made 22 starts and had a fifth-place finish at the season-ending Hooters 500. He returned in 1995 but dropped to 34th in points.

After making ten starts in 1996, Wallace was released in favor of Dick Trickle, whose best finish that season was a thirteenth at Michigan. Trickle signed the next season. He posted two top-fives and finished 31st in points. He improved to 29th in points in 1998, but he, along with Heling-Meyers and crew chief Tommy Baldwin Jr., left the team at the end of the year. During the season, Donlavey missed attending his first race in years, when he had to undergo heart surgery.

== Final years ==
After the loss of personnel in 1998, Donlavey announced that for 1999, he would field the No. 90 Big Daddy's BBQ Sauce Ford Taurus driven by rookie Mike Harmon. During the lead-up to the Daytona 500, rumors began spreading that Big Daddy's was not paying its sponsorship checks. Originally, those rumors were denied by Donlavey, but questions continued to swirl when the team practiced for the 500 without Big Daddy's sponsor decals on the car. Eventually, it was revealed that Big Daddy had not been paying its checks on time. Before long, tensions became so high that Harmon was fired from the ride before the race and replaced by Wallace. The team ran the 500 with sponsorship from Accu-turn and Kodiak (a one-race deal after Kodiak's regular team missed the race). The Big Daddy's contract was cancelled, and Morgan Shepherd took over the next week at Rockingham, and Stanton Barrett at Las Vegas Motor Speedway. Those two drivers, along with Hut Stricklin and Ed Berrier, shared the driving duties of the 90 for the rest of the year.

In 2000, Berrier signed to drive the 90 with sponsorship from Hills Brothers Coffee, competing for Rookie of the Year honors. Berrier struggled during the course of the season, DNQ-ing nine times, before he was released. Brian Simo took over at Watkins Glen, before Stricklin took over the rest of the year. He signed to drive the 90 full-time in 2001, and had a sixth-place run at Michigan, but the team continued to struggle. At the EA Sports 500, Donlavey fielded the No. 91 for Rick Mast, who had lost his ride when Eel River Racing folded. Mast failed to qualify, however.

Near the end of the season Sara Lee, Hills Brothers' parent company, asked Donlavey to move his team from Richmond to North Carolina. When Donlavey refused, Sara Lee immediately pulled the Hills Brothers sponsorship from the No. 90 and signed an agreement with Bill Davis Racing to sponsor the team's new No. 23 car with Stricklin as the driver. Donlavey placed Mast in the No. 90 permanently and ran it for the remainder of the year without any sponsor decals on it.

In the offseason Donlavey acquired sponsorship from the C.F. Sauer Company, whose Duke's Mayonnaise brand had been carried on the former Eel River Racing car Mast had driven. Mast had a best finish of 24th at Darlington when he began feeling anemic. He took several races off, and was replaced by Hermie Sadler and Gary Bradberry. Mast was eventually diagnosed as having suffered carbon monoxide poisoning and was forced to leave racing altogether, and once he did C.F. Sauer pulled its sponsorship from the No. 90. Donlavey then cut back his racing schedule, and planned to retire, but came back to field the Lucas Oil Ford for Lance Hooper at Bristol, as well as a car for team manager Jason Hedlesky at Lowe's. Hooper finished 31st and Hedlesky started 41st and finished 43rd. In 2003, Kirk Shelmerdine drove Donlavey's car at the Daytona 500, but missed the field. Hedlesky drove the car at the Winston Open, but Donlavey did not field an entry for the rest of the season. Donlavey hoped to revive his team in 2004 by announcing Kevin Ray would drive a limited schedule that season with sponsorship from Boudreaux's Butt Paste. Unfortunately, the deal ended up running only one ARCA race at Pocono. Late in the year A. J. Henriksen, began running races for Donlavey, but did not make a race. Donlavey did not field a car in 2005, but continued to stay involved in NASCAR. During a gathering at Richmond in September 2006, Donlavey stated that he still had several cars in his race shop, but was in the process of selling them and had no plans to return to racing. Donlavey would pass away in 2014.

== Driver history ==
Notable drivers (Sprint Cup race winners, Rookies of the Year, & renowned drivers from other championships such as IndyCars or sports cars) are highlighted in bold.

- (United States) Runt Harris (1950, 1957, 1959–1960)
- (United States) **Joe Weatherly** (1952)
- (United States) **Emanuel Zervakis** (1957–1958)
- (United States) **Speedy Thompson** (1960)
- (United States) **Tiny Lund** (1960)
- (United States) Johnny Roberts (1961)
- (United States) Sonny Hutchins (1965–1970)
- (United States) **LeeRoy Yarbrough** (1970, 1972)
- (United States) **Bill Dennis** (1970–1973, 1975)
- (United Kingdom) **Jackie Oliver** (1972)
- (United States) **Jimmy Hensley** (1972–1974)
- (United States) **Dick Brooks** (1972, 1975, 1977–1978, 1983–1984)
- (United States) **Fred Lorenzen** (1972)
- (United States) Ramo Stott (1972–1973)
- (United States) **Bobby Isaac** (1972, 1974)
- (United States) Max Berrier (1972)
- (United States) Richard D. Brown (1972)
- (United States) Butch Hartman (1972)
- (United States) Ron Hutcherson (1972)
- (United States) **Johnny Rutherford** (1972)
- (United States) Ray Hendrick (1973)
- (Canada) **Yvon Duhamel** (1973)
- (United States) Richie Panch (1973–1974)
- (United States) Eddie Pettyjohn (1973–1974)
- (United States) **Jody Ridley** (1973–1975, 1979–1982)
- (United States) Bud Moore (1973)
- (United States) **Harry Gant** (1973)
- (United States) **Charlie Glotzbach** (1973–1974, 1990, 1992)
- (United States) Paul Radford (1974)
- (United States) **George Follmer** (1974)
- (United States) Kenny Brightbill (1975)
- (Canada) **Earl Ross** (1975)
- (United States) Dick May (1975)
- (United States) **Buck Baker** (1976)
- (United States) Gene Felton (1976)
- (Belgium) Christine Beckers (1977)
- (United States) **Ricky Rudd** (1979)
- (United States) **Ken Schrader** (1985–1987)
- (United States) **Benny Parsons** (1988)
- (United States) Jimmy Means (1988)
- (United States) Chad Little (1989)
- (United States) Stan Barrett (1989)
- (United States) **Lennie Pond** (1989)
- (United States) **Ernie Irvan** (1990)
- (United States) J. T. Hayes (1990)
- (United States) **Buddy Baker** (1990)
- (United States) **Robby Gordon** (1991)
- (United States) Wally Dallenbach Jr. (1991)
- (United States) **Dorsey Schroeder** (1992, 1997)
- (United States) Kerry Teague (1992)
- (United States) Hut Stricklin (1992, 1999–2001)
- (United States) **Pancho Carter** (1992)
- (United States) **Todd Bodine** (1992 - Watkins Glen - Car number changed to #34, Car Owner listed as Cicci-Welliver but was actually Junie's car, Team and operated by Junie, revealed by Bodine in 2022 via The Scene Vault Podcast)
- (United States) **Bobby Hillin Jr.** (1992–1994)
- (United States) Mike Wallace (1994–1996, 1999)
- (United States) **Dick Trickle** (1996–1998)
- (United States) **Morgan Shepherd** (1999)
- (United States) Stanton Barrett (1999)
- (United States) Ed Berrier (1999–2000)
- (United States) Brian Simo (2000–2001; road courses only)
- (United States) Rick Mast (2001–2002)
- (United States) Hermie Sadler (2002)
- (United States) Gary Bradberry (2002)
- (United States) Lance Hooper (2002)
- (United States) Jason Hedlesky (2002)

== Motorsports career results ==
=== NASCAR ===
(key) (Bold – Pole position awarded by qualifying time. Italics – Pole position earned by points standings or practice time. * – Most laps led.)

==== Car No. 90 results ====
NASCAR Nextel Cup Series results
| Year | Driver | No. | Make | 1 | 2 | 3 | 4 | 5 | 6 | 7 | 8 | 9 | 10 | 11 | 12 | 13 | 14 | 15 | 16 | 17 | 18 | 19 | 20 | 21 | 22 | 23 | 24 | 25 | 26 | 27 | 28 | 29 | 30 | 31 | 32 | 33 | 34 | 35 | 36 | Owners | Pts |
|---|---|---|---|---|---|---|---|---|---|---|---|---|---|---|---|---|---|---|---|---|---|---|---|---|---|---|---|---|---|---|---|---|---|---|---|---|---|---|---|---|---|
| 1972 | Bill Dennis | 90 | Ford | RSD | DAY; 23 | RCH; 5 | ONT; DNQ | | | | | | | | | | | | | | | | | | | | | | | | | | | | | | | | | (Note: unknown) | |
| 1972 | Jackie Oliver | 90 | Ford | | | | | CAR; 40 | | | DAR; 22 | NWS | | TAL; 44 | CLT; 32 | DOV; 4 | | | TWS; 36 | DAY; 25 | BRI | | | | | | | | | | | | | | | | | | | (Note: unknown) | |
| 1972 | Dick Brooks | 90 | Ford | | | | | | ATL; 40 | BRI | | | | | | | MCH; 27 | RSD | | | | | | | MCH; 40 | NSV | | | | | | | | | | | | | | (Note: unknown) | |
| 1972 | Jimmy Hensley | 90 | Ford | | | | | | | | | | MAR; 33 | | | | | | | | | | | | | | | | | MAR; 5 | | | | | | | | | | (Note: unknown) | |
| 1972 | Fred Lorenzen | 90 | Ford | | | | | | | | | | | | | | | | | | | TRN; 4 | | | | | | | | | | | | | | | | | | (Note: unknown) | |
| 1972 | LeeRoy Yarbrough | 90 | Ford | | | | | | | | | | | | | | | | | | | | ATL; 5 | | | | DAR; 39 | | | | | | | | | | | | | (Note: unknown) | |
| 1972 | Ramo Stott | 90 | Ford | | | | | | | | | | | | | | | | | | | | | TAL; 2 | | | | | DOV; 3 | | | | | | | | | | | (Note: unknown) | |
| 1972 | David Pearson | 90 | Ford | | | | | | | | | | | | | | | | | | | | | | | | | RCH; 24 | | | | | | | | | | | | (Note: unknown) | |
| 1972 | Max Berrier | 90 | Ford | | | | | | | | | | | | | | | | | | | | | | | | | | | | NWS; 18 | | | | | | | | | (Note: unknown) | |
| 1972 | Butch Hartman | 90 | Ford | | | | | | | | | | | | | | | | | | | | | | | | | | | | | CLT; 5 | | | | | | | | (Note: unknown) | |
| 1972 | Ron Hutcherson | 90 | Ford | | | | | | | | | | | | | | | | | | | | | | | | | | | | | | CAR; 40 | | | | | | | (Note: unknown) | |
| 1972 | Johnny Rutherford | 90 | Ford | | | | | | | | | | | | | | | | | | | | | | | | | | | | | | | TWS; 26 | | | | | | (Note: unknown) | |
| 1973 | Ramo Stott | 90 | Mercury | RSD | DAY; 8 | | | | | | | | TAL; 44 | NSV | | | | | | | | | | | | | | | | | | | | | | | | | | | |
| 1973 | Ray Hendrick | 90 | Mercury | | | RCH; 26 | | | | | | | | | | | | | | | | | | | | | | | MAR; 11 | | | | | | | | | | | | |
| 1973 | Dick Brooks | 90 | Ford | | | | CAR; 5 | BRI | | | | | | | CLT; 9 | | | | | DAY; 9 | BRI | | | | | | | | | | | | | | | | | | | | |
| 1973 | Dick Brooks | 90 | Mercury | | | | | | ATL; 7 | | | | | | | | | | | | | | | NSV; 32 | | RCH; 27 | | NWS; 8 | | | | | | | | | | | | | |
| 1973 | Yvon Duhamel | 90 | Ford | | | | | | | NWS; 10 | | | | | | | | | | | | | | | | | | | | | | | | | | | | | | | |
| 1973 | Richie Panch | 90 | Mercury | | | | | | | | DAR; 17 | | | | | | | | | | | | | | | | | | | | | | | | | | | | | | |
| 1973 | Jimmy Hensley | 90 | Mercury | | | | | | | | | MAR; 7 | | | | | | | | | | | | | | | | | | | | | | | | | | | | | |
| 1973 | Eddie Pettyjohn | 90 | Mercury | | | | | | | | | | | | | DOV; 40 | TWS | RSD | MCH | | | | | | | | DOV; 10 | | | | | | | | | | | | | | |
| 1973 | Jody Ridley | 90 | Mercury | | | | | | | | | | | | | | | | | | | ATL; 5 | TAL; 37 | | | | | | | | | | | | | | | | | | |
| 1973 | Bud Moore | 90 | Mercury | | | | | | | | | | | | | | | | | | | | | | DAR; 29 | | | | | | | | | | | | | | | | |
| 1973 | Harry Gant | 90 | Ford | | | | | | | | | | | | | | | | | | | | | | | | | | | CLT; 11 | | | | | | | | | | | |
| 1973 | Charlie Glotzbach | 90 | Mercury | | | | | | | | | | | | | | | | | | | | | | | | | | | | CAR; 8 | | | | | | | | | | |
| 1974 | Bill Dennis | 90 | Ford | RSD | DAY; 21 | RCH; 8 | CAR; 7 | | | | | | | | | | | | | | | | | | | | | | | | | | | | | | | | | | |
| 1974 | Richie Panch | 90 | Ford | | | | | BRI; 27 | | | | | | | | | | | | | | | | | | | | | | | | | | | | | | | | | |
| 1974 | Jody Ridley | 90 | Ford | | | | | | ATL; 33 | | | | | | | | | | | | | | | | | | | | | | | CAR; 30 | | | | | | | | | |
| 1974 | Bobby Isaac | 90 | Ford | | | | | | | DAR; 33 | | | | | | | | | | | | | | | | | | | | | | | | | | | | | | | |
| 1974 | Harry Gant | 90 | Ford | | | | | | | | NWS; 9 | | | | | | | | | | | | | | | | | | | | | | | | | | | | | | |
| 1974 | Jimmy Hensley | 90 | Ford | | | | | | | | | MAR; 6 | | | | | | | | | | | | | | | | | | | | | | | | | | | | | |
| 1974 | Charlie Glotzbach | 90 | Ford | | | | | | | | | | TAL; 4 | NSV | | CLT; 37 | RSD | MCH | DAY; 22 | BRI; 4 | NSV; 6 | ATL; 26 | POC | TAL; 34 | MCH | DAR; 14 | RCH; 4 | | NWS; 15 | | CLT; 30 | | | | | | | | | | |
| 1974 | Eddie Pettyjohn | 90 | Ford | | | | | | | | | | | | DOV; 32 | | | | | | | | | | | | | DOV; 24 | | | | | | | | | | | | | |
| 1974 | Paul Radford | 90 | Ford | | | | | | | | | | | | | | | | | | | | | | | | | | | MAR; 30 | | | | | | | | | | | |
| 1974 | George Follmer | 90 | Ford | | | | | | | | | | | | | | | | | | | | | | | | | | | | | | ONT; 32 | | | | | | | | |
| 1975 | Dick Brooks | 90 | Ford | RSD | DAY; 22 | RCH; 4 | CAR; 4 | BRI; 19 | ATL; 4 | NWS; 8 | DAR; 25 | MAR; 8 | TAL; 3 | NSV | DOV; 29 | CLT; 7 | RSD | MCH; 7 | DAY; 6 | NSV | POC | TAL; 38 | MCH; 20 | DAR; 26 | DOV; 2 | NWS; 11 | MAR; 6 | CLT; 35 | RCH; 3 | CAR; 29 | BRI; 6 | ATL; 7 | ONT; 8 | | | | | | | | |
| 1976 | Dick Brooks | 90 | Ford | RSD | DAY; 41 | CAR; 24 | RCH; 26 | BRI; 6 | ATL; 7 | NWS; 7 | DAR; 35 | MAR; 5 | TAL; 12 | NSV | DOV; 7 | CLT; 7 | RSD | MCH; 6 | DAY; 8 | NSV | POC; 31 | TAL; 3 | MCH; 29 | BRI; 7 | DAR; 6 | RCH; 8 | DOV; 6 | MAR; 6 | NWS; 6 | CLT; 9 | CAR; 8 | ATL; 29 | ONT; 4 | | | | | | | | |
| 1977 | Dick Brooks | 90 | Ford | RSD | DAY; 5 | RCH; 27 | CAR; 22 | ATL; 23 | NWS; 6 | DAR; 9 | BRI; 2 | MAR; 6 | TAL; 7 | NSV | DOV; 5 | CLT; 8 | RSD | MCH; 7 | DAY; 9 | NSV; 5 | POC; 5 | TAL; 39 | MCH; 6 | BRI; 4 | DAR; 34 | RCH; 8 | DOV; 8 | MAR; 26 | NWS; 8 | CLT; 6 | CAR; 5 | ATL; 37 | ONT; 6 | | | | | | | | |
| 1978 | Dick Brooks | 90 | Mercury | RSD | DAY; 5 | | | | | | | | TAL; 15 | | | | | | DAY; 36 | | POC; 7 | TAL; 9 | MCH; 6 | | DAR; 25 | | | | | CLT; 10 | | ATL; 12 | ONT; 9 | | | | | | | | |
| 1978 | Dick Brooks | 90 | Ford | | | RCH; 5 | CAR; 28 | ATL; 6 | BRI; 19 | DAR; 35 | NWS; 8 | MAR; 27 | | DOV; 9 | CLT; 19 | NSV | RSD | MCH; 7 | | NSV; 8 | | | | BRI; 4 | | RCH; 5 | DOV; 6 | MAR; 13 | NWS; 9 | | CAR; 5 | | | | | | | | | | |
| 1979 | Ricky Rudd | 90 | Mercury | RSD | DAY; 31 | | | ATL; 9 | | | DAR; 8 | | TAL; 27 | | | CLT; 6 | TWS; 28 | RSD | MCH; 8 | DAY; 13 | NSV | POC; 5 | TAL; 3 | MCH; 7 | | DAR; 8 | | | | CLT; 11 | | | ATL; 8 | ONT; 10 | | | | | | | |
| 1979 | Ricky Rudd | 90 | Ford | | | CAR; 34 | | | NWS; 14 | BRI; 10 | | MAR; 12 | | NSV; 10 | DOV; 14 | | | | | | | | | | | | RCH; 3 | DOV; 8 | MAR; 6 | | NWS; 5 | CAR; 20 | | | | | | | | | |
| 1979 | Ricky Rudd | 90 | Chevy | | | | RCH; 11 | | | | | | | | | | | | | | | | | | BRI; 9 | | | | | | | | | | | | | | | | |
| 1980 | Jody Ridley | 90 | Ford | RSD; 16 | | RCH; 18 | CAR; 29 | | BRI; 11 | DAR; 10 | NWS; 7 | MAR; 7 | | NSV; 8 | DOV; 6 | | TWS; 26 | RSD; 11 | MCH; 6 | | NSV; 8 | POC; 18 | | | | DAR; 30 | RCH; 5 | DOV; 9 | NWS; 9 | MAR; 9 | | CAR; 5 | ATL; 6 | ONT; 18 | | | | | | | |
| 1980 | Jody Ridley | 90 | Mercury | | DAY; 10 | | | ATL; 6 | | | | | TAL; 10 | | | CLT; 12 | | | | DAY; 7 | | | TAL; 30 | MCH; 18 | BRI; 12 | | | | | | CLT; 8 | | | | | | | | | | |
| 1981 | Jody Ridley | 90 | Ford | RSD; 7 | DAY; 7 | RCH; 8 | CAR | ATL; 6 | BRI; 6 | NWS; 28 | DAR; 7 | MAR; 6 | TAL; 31 | NSV; 25 | DOV; 1 | CLT; 20 | TWS; 6 | RSD; 7 | MCH; 4 | DAY; 38 | NSV; 10 | POC; 15 | TAL; 8 | MCH; 12 | BRI; 20 | DAR; 12 | RCH; 9 | DOV; 11 | MAR; 21 | NWS; 7 | CLT; 15 | CAR; 10 | ATL; 5 | RSD; 9 | | | | | | | |
| 1982 | Jody Ridley | 90 | Ford | DAY; 9 | RCH; 13 | BRI; 20 | ATL; 17 | CAR; 33 | DAR; 22 | NWS; 17 | MAR; 12 | TAL; 38 | NSV; 13 | DOV; 17 | CLT; 6 | POC; 9 | RSD; 7 | MCH; 27 | DAY; 15 | NSV; 8 | POC; 36 | TAL; 14 | MCH; 26 | BRI; 8 | DAR; 28 | RCH; 25 | DOV; 25 | NWS; 9 | CLT; 7 | MAR; 7 | CAR; 31 | ATL; 28 | RSD; 9 | | | | | | | | |
| 1983 | Dick Brooks | 90 | Ford | DAY; 5 | RCH; 13 | CAR; 8 | ATL; 6 | DAR; 19 | NWS; 20 | MAR; 8 | TAL; 14 | NSV; 25 | DOV; 15 | BRI; 21 | CLT; 37 | RSD; 5 | POC; 28 | MCH; 12 | DAY; 32 | NSV; 14 | POC; 15 | TAL; 7 | MCH; 21 | BRI; 21 | DAR; 31 | RCH; 13 | DOV; 32 | MAR; 16 | NWS; 15 | CLT; 37 | CAR; 18 | ATL; 31 | RSD; 34 | | | | | | | | |
| 1984 | Dick Brooks | 90 | Ford | DAY; 26 | RCH; 19 | CAR; 23* | ATL; 14 | BRI; 30 | NWS; 11 | DAR; 31 | MAR; 11 | TAL; 30 | NSV; 9 | DOV; 35 | CLT; 13 | RSD; 12 | POC; 20 | MCH; 11 | DAY; 38 | NSV; 27 | POC; 11 | TAL; 35 | MCH; 18 | BRI; 3 | DAR; 6 | RCH; 10 | DOV; 7 | MAR; 11 | CLT; 13 | NWS; 11 | CAR; 30 | ATL; 17 | RSD; 24 | | | | | | | | |
| 1985 | Ken Schrader | 90 | Ford | DAY; 11 | RCH; 14 | CAR; 40 | ATL; 17 | BRI; 10 | DAR; 13 | NWS; 14 | MAR; 16 | TAL; 20 | DOV; 10 | CLT; 38 | RSD; 10 | POC; 15 | MCH; 34 | DAY; 21 | POC; 15 | TAL; 11 | MCH; 20 | BRI; 19 | DAR; 14 | RCH; 15 | DOV; 16 | MAR; 26 | NWS; 15 | CLT; 25 | CAR; 19 | ATL; 15 | RSD; 23 | | | | | | | | | | |
| 1986 | Ken Schrader | 90 | Ford | DAY; 33 | RCH; 23 | CAR; 22 | ATL; 21 | BRI; 13 | DAR; 10 | NWS; 14 | MAR; 7 | TAL; 26 | DOV; 10 | CLT; 23 | RSD; 17 | POC; 27 | MCH; 20 | DAY; 12 | POC; 23 | TAL; 31 | GLN; 16 | MCH; 11 | BRI; 28 | DAR; 36 | RCH; 25 | DOV; 22 | MAR; 7 | NWS; 18 | CLT; 28 | CAR; 14 | ATL; 17 | RSD; 11 | | | | | | | | | |
| 1987 | Ken Schrader | 90 | Ford | DAY; 7 | CAR; 10 | RCH; 13 | ATL; 29 | **DAR**; 5 | NWS; 16 | BRI; 17 | MAR; 7 | TAL; 8 | CLT; 29 | DOV; 6 | POC; 17 | RSD; 10 | MCH; 8 | DAY; 7* | POC; 10 | TAL; 18 | GLN; 27 | MCH; 34 | BRI; 27 | DAR; 11 | RCH; 21 | DOV; 11 | MAR; 12 | NWS; 15 | CLT; 17 | CAR; 14 | RSD; 29 | ATL; 35 | | | | | | | | | |
| 1988 | Benny Parsons | 90 | Ford | DAY; 31 | RCH; 14 | CAR; 33 | ATL; 13 | DAR; 34 | BRI; 13 | NWS; 17 | MAR; 14 | TAL; 24 | CLT; 25 | DOV; 22 | RSD; 13 | POC; 31 | MCH; 38 | DAY; 35 | POC; 35 | TAL; 27 | GLN; 39 | MCH; 15 | | DAR; 13 | RCH; 20 | DOV; 27 | MAR; 20 | CLT; 12 | NWS; QL^{†} | CAR; 13 | PHO; 8 | ATL; 34 | | | | | | | | 27th | 2650 |
| 1988 | Tommy Ellis | 90 | Ford | | | | | | | | | | | | | | | | | | | | BRI; DNQ | | | | | | | | | | | | | | | | | 27th | 2650 |
| 1988 | Jimmy Means | 90 | Ford | | | | | | | | | | | | | | | | | | | | | | | | | | NWS; 24 | | | | | | | | | | | 27th | 2650 |
| 1989 | Chad Little | 90 | Ford | DAY; 36 | CAR | ATL; 35 | RCH; 22 | DAR; 37 | BRI | NWS | MAR; 26 | TAL; 34 | CLT; 18 | DOV | | | | | | | | MCH; 26 | BRI | DAR | | | | | | | | | | | | | | | | | |
| 1989 | Stan Barrett | 90 | Ford | | | | | | | | | | | | SON; DNQ | POC | MCH | DAY; 37 | POC | TAL; 34 | GLN; 26 | | | | | | | | | | PHO; 31 | | | | | | | | | | |
| 1989 | Lennie Pond | 90 | Ford | | | | | | | | | | | | | | | | | | | | | | RCH; 11 | DOV | MAR | CLT | NWS | CAR | | | | | | | | | | | |
| 1989 | Tracy Leslie | 90 | Ford | | | | | | | | | | | | | | | | | | | | | | | | | | | | | ATL; DNQ | | | | | | | | | |
| 1990 | Ernie Irvan | 90 | Ford | DAY; 13 | RCH; 22 | CAR; 29 | | | | | | | | | | | | | | | | | | | | | | | | | | | | | | | | | | | |
| 1990 | Buddy Baker | 90 | Ford | | | | ATL; 21 | DAR; 40 | BRI | NWS | MAR | TAL; 31 | CLT; 15 | DOV | SON | POC | MCH | DAY; 30 | POC | TAL; 40 | | MCH; 23 | BRI | DAR | | | | | CLT; 37 | CAR | PHO | ATL | | | | | | | | | |
| 1990 | Troy Beebe | 90 | Ford | | | | | | | | | | | | | | | | | | GLN; DNQ | | | | | | | | | | | | | | | | | | | | |
| 1990 | Charlie Glotzbach | 90 | Ford | | | | | | | | | | | | | | | | | | | | | | RCH; 22 | DOV | MAR | NWS | | | | | | | | | | | | | |
| 1991 | Robby Gordon | 90 | Ford | DAY; 18 | RCH; 26 | CAR | | | | | | | | | | | | | | | | | | | | | | | | | | | | | | | | | | | |
| 1991 | Wally Dallenbach Jr. | 90 | Ford | | | | ATL; 26 | DAR | BRI | NWS | MAR | TAL; 34 | CLT; 33 | DOV | SON | POC | MCH; 28 | DAY; 34 | POC | TAL; 41 | GLN; 32 | MCH; 22 | BRI | DAR | RCH; 25 | | MAR | NWS | CLT; 19 | CAR | PHO | ATL; 36 | | | | | | | | | |
| 1991 | Steve Perry | 90 | Ford | | | | | | | | | | | | | | | | | | | | | | | DOV; 27 | | | | | | | | | | | | | | | |
| 1992 | Dorsey Schroeder | 90 | Ford | DAY; 19 | CAR | | | | | | | | | | | | | | | | | | | | | | | | | | | | | | | | | | | | |
| 1992 | Charlie Glotzbach | 90 | Ford | | | RCH; 26 | ATL; 18 | | | | | TAL; 37 | CLT; 36 | DOV | SON | POC | MCH; 16 | DAY; 20 | POC | TAL; 30 | GLN | | | | | | | | | | | | | | | | | | | | |
| 1992 | Kerry Teague | 90 | Ford | | | | | DAR; 38 | BRI | NWS | MAR | | | | | | | | | | | | | | | | | | | | | | | | | | | | | | |
| 1992 | Chuck Bown | 90 | Ford | | | | | | | | | | | | | | | | | | | MCH; DNQ | BRI | DAR | | | | | | | | | | | | | | | | | |
| 1992 | Hut Stricklin | 90 | Ford | | | | | | | | | | | | | | | | | | | | | | RCH; 30 | DOV; 15 | MAR; 24 | NWS; 30 | | | | | | | | | | | | | |
| 1992 | Pancho Carter | 90 | Ford | | | | | | | | | | | | | | | | | | | | | | | | | | CLT; 32 | CAR | PHO | | | | | | | | | | |
| 1992 | Bobby Hillin Jr. | 90 | Ford | | | | | | | | | | | | | | | | | | | | | | | | | | | | | ATL; 30 | | | | | | | | | |
| 1993 | Bobby Hillin Jr. | 90 | Ford | DAY; 35 | CAR; 19 | RCH; 28 | ATL; 15 | DAR; 35 | BRI; 33 | NWS; 26 | MAR; 23 | TAL; 17 | SON; 41 | CLT; 16 | DOV; 25 | POC; 38 | MCH; 33 | DAY; 12 | NHA; 20 | POC; 20 | TAL; 13 | GLN; 35 | MCH; 11 | BRI; 12 | DAR; 24 | RCH; 27 | DOV; 12 | MAR; 22 | NWS; 22 | CLT; 20 | CAR; 33 | PHO; 18 | ATL; 41 | | | | | | | 30th | 2717 |
| 1994 | Bobby Hillin Jr. | 90 | Ford | DAY; 24 | CAR; 33 | RCH; 26 | | | | | | | | | | | | | | | | | | | | | | | | | | | | | | | | | | 33rd | 2431 |
| 1994 | Mike Wallace | 90 | Ford | | | | ATL; 27 | DAR; 18 | BRI; 28 | NWS; DNQ | MAR; DNQ | TAL; 15 | SON; 23 | CLT; 23 | DOV; 13 | POC; 36 | MCH; DNQ | DAY; 12 | NHA; 28 | POC; 30 | TAL; 13 | IND; DNQ | GLN; DNQ | MCH; 16 | BRI; 24 | DAR; 17 | RCH; 23 | DOV; 29 | MAR; 28 | NWS; DNQ | CLT; 17 | CAR; 16 | PHO; 28 | ATL; 5 | | | | | | 33rd | 2431 |
| 1995 | Mike Wallace | 90 | Ford | DAY; 39 | CAR; 15 | RCH; 26 | ATL; 40 | DAR; 15 | BRI; DNQ | NWS; 36 | MAR; 27 | TAL; 23 | SON; 34 | CLT; 12 | DOV; 14 | POC; 32 | MCH; 32 | DAY; 37 | NHA; 32 | POC; 26 | TAL; 12 | IND; 26 | GLN; DNQ | MCH; 20 | BRI; 8 | DAR; 39 | RCH; DNQ | DOV; 31 | MAR; 17 | NWS; DNQ | CLT; 23 | CAR; 39 | PHO; 36 | ATL; DNQ | | | | | | 37th | 2178 |
| 1996 | Mike Wallace | 90 | Ford | DAY; 37 | CAR; 17 | RCH; 24 | ATL; 33 | DAR; 21 | BRI; DNQ | NWS; DNQ | MAR; 32 | TAL; 38 | SON; 44 | CLT; 39 | DOV; 19 | | | | | | | | | | | | | | | | | | | | | | | | | 39th | 2029 |
| 1996 | Dick Trickle | 90 | Ford | | | | | | | | | | | | | POC; 26 | MCH; 39 | DAY; 28 | NHA; 27 | POC; 18 | TAL; 38 | IND; 23 | GLN; 39 | MCH; 38 | BRI; 26 | DAR; 36 | RCH; 27 | DOV; 23 | MAR; 13 | NWS; DNQ | CLT; 35 | CAR; 31 | PHO; 20 | ATL; DNQ | | | | | | 39th | 2029 |
| 1997 | Dick Trickle | 90 | Ford | DAY; 30 | CAR; 19 | RCH; 29 | ATL; 28 | DAR; DNQ | TEX; 23 | BRI; 11 | MAR; 30 | SON; DNQ | TAL; 15 | CLT; 33 | DOV; 41 | POC; 26 | MCH; 23 | CAL; 22 | DAY; 25 | NHA; 25 | POC; 19 | IND; DNQ | | MCH; 39 | BRI; 3 | DAR; 13 | RCH; 19 | NHA; 22 | DOV; 18 | MAR; 42 | CLT; 14 | TAL; 23 | CAR; 5 | PHO; 40 | ATL; 14 | | | | | 28th | 2765 |
| 1997 | Dorsey Schroeder | 90 | Ford | | | | | | | | | | | | | | | | | | | | GLN; 31 | | | | | | | | | | | | | | | | | 28th | 2765 |
| 1998 | Dick Trickle | 90 | Ford | DAY; 27 | CAR; 37 | LVS; 16 | ATL; 6 | DAR; 24 | BRI; 13 | TEX; 22 | MAR; 37 | TAL; 20 | CAL; 37 | CLT; 21 | DOV; 21 | RCH; 17 | MCH; 24 | POC; 27 | SON; 33 | NHA; 17 | POC; 29 | IND; 18 | GLN; 41 | MCH; 38 | BRI; 43 | NHA; 19 | DAR; 33 | RCH; 42 | DOV; 31 | MAR; 33 | CLT; 33 | TAL; 38 | DAY; DNQ | PHO; 19 | CAR; 23 | ATL; 12 | | | | 30th | 2709 |
| 1999 | Mike Wallace | 90 | Ford | DAY; 23 | | | | | | | | | | | | | | | | | | | | | | | | | | | | | | | | | | | | 44th | 1083 |
| 1999 | Morgan Shepherd | 90 | Ford | | CAR; 32 | | ATL; DNQ | | | | MAR; DNQ | | | | | | | | | | | | | | | | | | | | | | | | | | | | | 44th | 1083 |
| 1999 | Stanton Barrett | 90 | Ford | | | LVS; 30 | | | TEX; DNQ | BRI; DNQ | | | | | | | | | | DAY; DNQ | NHA | POC; 31 | IND; DNQ | GLN | MCH; DNQ | BRI | DAR; DNQ | RCH; DNQ | NHA | | | | | | | | | | | 44th | 1083 |
| 1999 | Ed Berrier | 90 | Ford | | | | | DAR; 39 | | | | | | | | | | | | | | | | | | | | | | DOV; 31 | MAR | CLT; DNQ | TAL; 33 | CAR; DNQ | PHO | HOM; DNQ | ATL; 25 | | | 44th | 1083 |
| 1999 | Loy Allen Jr. | 90 | Ford | | | | | | | | | TAL; DNQ | | | | | | | | | | | | | | | | | | | | | | | | | | | | 44th | 1083 |
| 1999 | Hut Stricklin | 90 | Ford | | | | | | | | | | CAL; DNQ | RCH; DNQ | CLT; 33 | DOV; DNQ | MCH; DNQ | POC; DNQ | SON | | | | | | | | | | | | | | | | | | | | | 44th | 1083 |
| 2000 | Ed Berrier | 90 | Ford | DAY; 37 | CAR; 36 | LVS; DNQ | ATL; DNQ | DAR; DNQ | BRI; DNQ | TEX; 35 | MAR; DNQ | TAL; 28 | CAL; DNQ | RCH; DNQ | CLT; DNQ | DOV; 41 | MCH; 33 | POC; 28 | | DAY; 26 | NHA; 37 | POC; 33 | | | | | | | | | | | | | | | | | | 44th | 1510 |
| 2000 | Brian Simo | 90 | Ford | | | | | | | | | | | | | | | | SON; 36 | | | | | GLN; DNQ | | | | | | | | | | | | | | | | 44th | 1510 |
| 2000 | Hut Stricklin | 90 | Ford | | | | | | | | | | | | | | | | | | | | IND; 14 | | MCH; 39 | BRI; DNQ | DAR; 34 | RCH; 36 | NHA; 28 | DOV; DNQ | MAR; 42 | CLT; 42 | TAL; DNQ | CAR; DNQ | PHO; DNQ | HOM; DNQ | ATL; DNQ | | | 44th | 1510 |
| 2001 | Hut Stricklin | 90 | Ford | DAY; DNQ | CAR; 31 | LVS; 40 | ATL; 28 | DAR; 28 | BRI; DNQ | TEX; 26 | MAR; DNQ | TAL; DNQ | CAL; 12 | RCH; DNQ | CLT; 16 | DOV; 30 | MCH; 6 | POC; 28 | | DAY; DNQ | CHI; 31 | NHA; 35 | POC; 40 | IND; 29 | | MCH; 32 | BRI; DNQ | DAR; 32 | RCH; DNQ | DOV; 25 | KAN; 35 | CLT; 30 | MAR; 26 | TAL; 36 | | | | | | 40th | 2195 |
| 2001 | Brian Simo | 90 | Ford | | | | | | | | | | | | | | | | SON; 42 | | | | | | GLN; 37 | | | | | | | | | | | | | | | 40th | 2195 |
| 2001 | Rick Mast | 90 | Ford | | | | | | | | | | | | | | | | | | | | | | | | | | | | | | | | PHO; 25 | CAR; DNQ | HOM; 38 | ATL; DNQ | NHA; 28 | 40th | 2195 |
| 2002 | Rick Mast | 90 | Ford | DAY; DNQ | CAR; 34 | LVS; 40 | ATL; 33 | DAR; 24 | BRI; 33 | TEX; 29 | MAR; 37 | TAL; DNQ | CAL; 32 | RCH; 35 | | | | | | | | | | | | | | | | | | | | | | | | | | 42nd | 978 |
| 2002 | Hermie Sadler | 90 | Ford | | | | | | | | | | | | CLT; 29 | DOV; DNQ | POC; 29 | | | | | | | | | | | | | | | | | | | | | | | 42nd | 978 |
| 2002 | Gary Bradberry | 90 | Ford | | | | | | | | | | | | | | | MCH; 43 | SON | | | | | | | | | | | | | | | | | | | | | 42nd | 978 |
| 2002 | Ed Berrier | 90 | Ford | | | | | | | | | | | | | | | | | DAY; DNQ | CHI | NHA | POC | IND | GLN | MCH | | | | | | | | | | | | | | 42nd | 978 |
| 2002 | Lance Hooper | 90 | Ford | | | | | | | | | | | | | | | | | | | | | | | | BRI; 31 | DAR | RCH | NHA | DOV | KAN | TAL | | | | | | | 42nd | 978 |
| 2002 | Jason Hedlesky | 90 | Ford | | | | | | | | | | | | | | | | | | | | | | | | | | | | | | | CLT; 43 | MAR | ATL | CAR | PHO | HOM | 42nd | 978 |
| 2003 | Kirk Shelmerdine | 90 | Ford | DAY; DNQ | CAR | LVS | ATL | DAR | BRI | TEX | TAL | MAR | CAL | RCH | CLT | DOV | POC | MCH | SON | DAY | CHI | NHA | POC | IND | GLN | MCH | BRI | DAR | RCH | NHA | DOV | TAL | KAN | CLT | MAR | ATL | PHO | CAR | HOM | 75th | 19 |
| 2004 | Andy Hillenburg | 90 | Ford | DAY; DNQ | CAR | LVS | ATL | DAR | BRI | TEX | MAR | TAL | CAL | RCH | CLT | DOV | POC | MCH | SON | DAY | CHI | NHA | | | | | | | | | | | | | | | | | | 70th | 53 |
| 2004 | A. J. Henriksen | 90 | Ford | | | | | | | | | | | | | | | | | | | | POC; DNQ | IND | GLN | MCH | BRI | CAL | RCH | NHA | DOV | TAL | KAN | CLT | MAR | ATL | PHO | DAR | HOM | 70th | 53 |

Footnotes
