= St. John's German Evangelical Church =

St. John's German Evangelical Church or variations may refer to:

- St. John's Evangelical Church (Louisville, Kentucky), a German Evangelical church significant in History of the Germans in Louisville
- St. John's Evangelical Lutheran German Church and Cemetery, Hayes Center, Nebraska, listed on the National Register of Historic Places (NRHP)
- St. John's German Evangelical Lutheran Church, Lyons, Nebraska, NRHP-listed
- German Evangelical St. Johns Church (Hebron, North Dakota), also known as Deutsche Evangelische St. Johannes Kirche, NRHP-listed
- St. John's Evangelical Lutheran Church (Springfield, Ohio), also known as St. John's Evangelical German Lutheran Church, NRHP-listed
- St. John's Lutheran Church (Walhalla, South Carolina), also known as St. John's German Evangelical Church of Walhalla, NRHP-listed
- Saint John's Evangelical Lutheran Church (Milwaukee, Wisconsin), a German Evangelical church, NRHP-listed
- St. John's United Church of Christ, Richmond, Virginia, a historic church originally known as Saint John's German Lutheran Evangelical Church
