= King's Barbecue =

Sit-down barbecue restaurant in Petersburg, Virginia

- Interactive map of King's Barbecue

Restaurant information
- Established: 1946
- Food type: barbecue
- Dress code: Casual
- Location: 2910 S Crater Rd, Petersburg, Virginia, 23805, United States
- Coordinates: 37°11′31″N 77°22′26″W
- Website: Official website

King's Barbecue is a sit-down barbecue restaurant in Petersburg, Virginia.

== History ==
In 1946, brothers John and Clinton King took over the business of their former employer, Alford's Barbeque, and christened it King's. They adopted the sauce of Alford's, which had also been purchased by C. F. Sauer Company.

King's Barbecue closed in June 2023. It was scheduled to reopen in 2026.
