= Sauer's Gardens =

Neighborhood in Richmond, Virginia, United States

- Neighborhood of Richmond
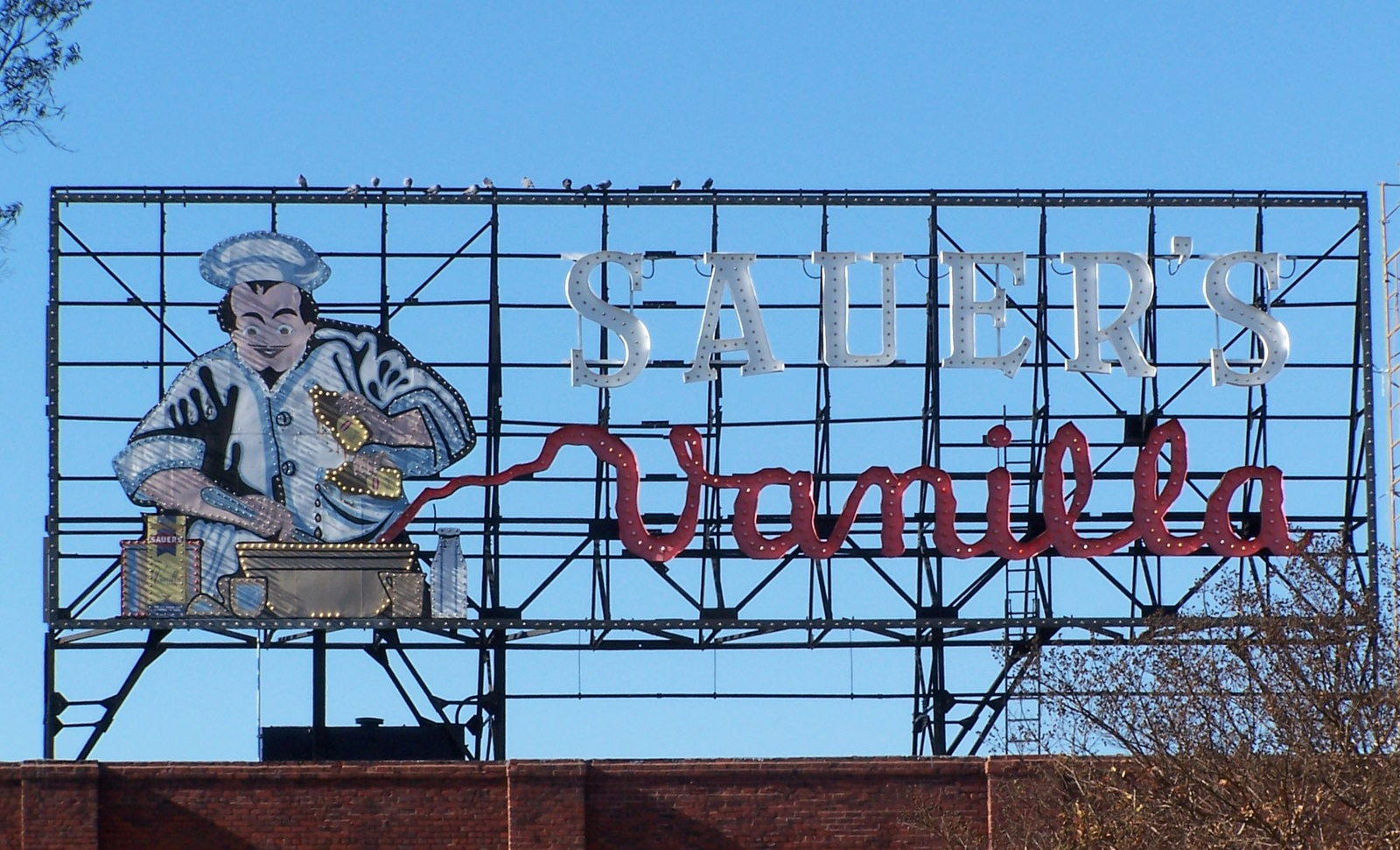
- The Sauer's Vanilla sign.
- Interactive map of Sauer's Gardens
- Coordinates: 37.57169°N 77.48432°W
- Country: United States
- State: Virginia
- City: Richmond
- Time zone: UTC−04:00 (Eastern Daylight Time)
  - Summer (DST): UTC−05:00 (Eastern Standard Time)
- ZIP code: 23230
- Area code: 804
- ISO 3166 code: 1

Sauer's Gardens is a neighborhood in the West End of Richmond, Virginia. The neighborhood began development in the 1920s, and now contains about 300 homes.

== History ==
The neighborhood was developed and named for Conrad Frederick Sauer, founder of the C. F. Sauer Company.

Development of the neighborhood began in the 1920s, and was originally focused around a large garden property, which included a fountain, lake and an "artificial mountain". The garden later went into disrepair and was torn down in the 1980s.

=== Subdivisions ===
Sauer's Gardens is divided into the follow subdivisions:

- Leonard Heights
- Monument Avenue Gardens
- Patterson Annex
