= St. John's United Church of Christ, Richmond, Virginia =

Coordinates: 37.552591°N 77.457172°W

St. John's United Church of Christ is a historic church in Richmond, Virginia. It was founded as 'Saint John's German Lutheran Evangelical Church and was called St. John’s Evangelical and Reformed Church from 1943 to 1962.

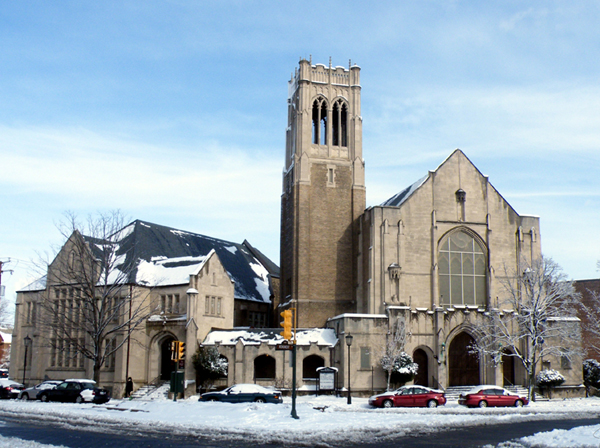
St John's United Church of Christ Richmond, VA

The congregation formed in 1843 to minister to the very large German immigrant population of Richmond (especially the Carver neighborhood) at the time. The name "German Lutheran Evangelical Church" was selected as its members were Lutherans, but the church has never been affiliated with any Lutheran denomination. It operated independently until 1874 when it affiliated with the German Evangelical Synod of North America, a predecessor of the United Church of Christ.

After meeting in member homes for several years, the congregation moved into a new church building on North Fifth Street at Jackson in 1847. It moved into a larger building in 1881, and into its current facilities in 1928. The church houses one of the three remaining intact EM Skinner pipe organs on the East Coast of the United States.

One prominent member of St. Johns was Conrad Frederick Sauer, whose family-owned CF Sauer factory exists nearby on Broad Street to this day. . Virginia Governor Mills E. Godwin Jr. and his family were members of this congregation during his first term. St John's was also influential in forming the Gesangsverein Virginia, or "Virginia" German singing society that was a pillar of Richmond's German community and still exists today
