= 2001 Protection One 400 =

Auto race held at Kansas Speedway in 2001

Race details
- Race 28 of 36 in the 2001 NASCAR Winston Cup Series
- 2001 Protection One 400 program cover
- Date: September 30, 2001
- Location: Kansas Speedway, Kansas City, Kansas
- Course: Permanent racing facility
- Course length: 1.5 miles (2.4 km)
- Distance: 267 laps, 400 mi (644.542 km)
- Weather: Mild with temperatures of 73.9 °F (23.3 °C); wind speeds of 7 miles per hour (11 km/h)
- Average speed: 110.576 mph (177.955 km/h)

Pole position
| Driver | Jason Leffler | Chip Ganassi Racing |
- Time: 30.595

Most laps led
| Driver | Rusty Wallace | Penske Racing |
- Laps: 117

Winner
| No. 24 | Jeff Gordon | Hendrick Motorsports |

Television in the United States
- Network: NBC
- Announcers: Allen Bestwick, Benny Parsons, Wally Dallenbach Jr.
- Nielsen ratings: 4.7

The 2001 Protection One 400 was a NASCAR Winston Cup Series stock car race held on September 30, 2001, at Kansas Speedway in Kansas City, Kansas. The race was the 28th of the 2001 NASCAR Winston Cup Series season. The race was the inaugural Cup race held at the 1.5-mile (2.4 km) track. Jason Leffler from Chip Ganassi Racing won his first career pole position with a qualifying speed of 176.499 miles per hour (284.048 km/h). Penske Racing's Rusty Wallace led the most laps with 117, while Jeff Gordon of Hendrick Motorsports won the race.

Due to the September 11 attacks happening earlier in the month, the Federal Aviation Administration (FAA) ordered a no-fly zone, prohibiting aircraft from flying within three miles of any sporting event area, which also includes an altitude of 300 feet. To increase security, coolers and large bags were banned from the track, At the same time, other items like purses and binoculars were subject to inspection. Meanwhile, in the sense of patriotism after the attacks, Sterling Marlin ran a "God Bless America" paint scheme, which had not been prepared in time for the 2001 MBNA Cal Ripken Jr. 400 the week before. To support victims of the attacks, Marlin's sponsor Coors Brewing Company donated $10 for every lap completed at the race by Marlin.

== Entry list ==
| Car | Driver | Team | Manufacturer |
|---|---|---|---|
| 1 | Kenny Wallace | Dale Earnhardt, Inc. | Chevrolet |
| 01 | Jason Leffler | Chip Ganassi Racing | Dodge |
| 2 | Rusty Wallace | Penske Racing South | Ford |
| 02 | Ryan Newman | Penske Racing South | Ford |
| 4 | Kevin Lepage | Morgan–McClure Motorsports | Pontiac |
| 5 | Terry Labonte | Hendrick Motorsports | Chevrolet |
| 6 | Mark Martin | Roush Racing | Ford |
| 7 | Mike Wallace | Ultra Motorsports | Ford |
| 8 | Dale Earnhardt Jr. | Dale Earnhardt, Inc. | Chevrolet |
| 9 | Bill Elliott | Evernham Motorsports | Dodge |
| 10 | Johnny Benson Jr. | MBV Motorsports | Pontiac |
| 11 | Brett Bodine | Brett Bodine Racing | Ford |
| 12 | Jeremy Mayfield | Penske Racing South | Ford |
| 14 | Ron Hornaday Jr. | A.J. Foyt Racing | Chevrolet |
| 15 | Michael Waltrip | Dale Earnhardt, Inc. | Chevrolet |
| 17 | Matt Kenseth | Roush Racing | Ford |
| 18 | Bobby Labonte | Joe Gibbs Racing | Pontiac |
| 19 | Casey Atwood | Evernham Motorsports | Dodge |
| 20 | Tony Stewart | Joe Gibbs Racing | Toyota |
| 21 | Elliott Sadler | Wood Brothers Racing | Ford |
| 22 | Ward Burton | Bill Davis Racing | Pontiac |
| 24 | Jeff Gordon | Hendrick Motorsports | Chevrolet |
| 25 | Jerry Nadeau | Hendrick Motorsports | Chevrolet |
| 26 | Jimmy Spencer | Haas-Carter Motorsports | Ford |
| 27 | Rick Mast | Eel River Racing | Pontiac |
| 28 | Ricky Rudd | Robert Yates Racing | Ford |
| 29 | Kevin Harvick | Richard Childress Racing | Chevrolet |
| 31 | Robby Gordon | Richard Childress Racing | Chevrolet |
| 32 | Ricky Craven | PPI Motorsports | Ford |
| 33 | Joe Nemechek | Andy Petree Racing | Chevrolet |
| 36 | Ken Schrader | MB2 Motorsports | Pontiac |
| 40 | Sterling Marlin | Chip Ganassi Racing | Dodge |
| 43 | John Andretti | Petty Enterprises | Dodge |
| 44 | Buckshot Jones | Petty Enterprises | Dodge |
| 45 | Kyle Petty | Petty Enterprises | Ford |
| 55 | Bobby Hamilton | Andy Petree Racing | Chevrolet |
| 57 | Derrike Cope | Team CLR | Ford |
| 66 | Todd Bodine | Haas-Carter Motorsports | Ford |
| 77 | Robert Pressley | Jasper Motorsports | Ford |
| 88 | Dale Jarrett | Robert Yates Racing | Ford |
| 90 | Hut Stricklin | Donlavey Racing | Ford |
| 92 | Stacy Compton | Melling Racing | Dodge |
| 93 | Dave Blaney | Bill Davis Racing | Dodge |
| 96 | Andy Houston | PPI Motorsports | Ford |
| 97 | Kurt Busch | Roush Racing | Ford |
| 99 | Jeff Burton | Roush Racing | Ford |

== Qualifying ==
| Pos. | Car | Driver | Manufacturer | Time | Avg. Speed (mph) |
|---|---|---|---|---|---|
| 1 | 01 | Jason Leffler | Dodge | 30.595 | 176.499 |
| 2 | 24 | Jeff Gordon | Chevrolet | 30.629 | 176.304 |
| 3 | 9 | Bill Elliott | Dodge | 30.638 | 176.252 |
| 4 | 92 | Stacy Compton | Dodge | 30.656 | 176.148 |
| 5 | 19 | Casey Atwood | Dodge | 30.684 | 175.987 |
| 6 | 10 | Johnny Benson Jr. | Pontiac | 30.707 | 175.856 |
| 7 | 20 | Tony Stewart | Pontiac | 30.753 | 175.593 |
| 8 | 28 | Ricky Rudd | Ford | 30.757 | 175.570 |
| 9 | 32 | Ricky Craven | Ford | 30.772 | 175.484 |
| 10 | 18 | Bobby Labonte | Pontiac | 30.802 | 175.313 |
| 11 | 2 | Rusty Wallace | Ford | 30.829 | 175.160 |
| 12 | 43 | John Andretti | Dodge | 30.830 | 175.154 |
| 13 | 17 | Matt Kenseth | Ford | 30.838 | 175.109 |
| 14 | 26 | Jimmy Spencer | Ford | 30.854 | 175.018 |
| 15 | 29 | Kevin Harvick | Chevrolet | 30.862 | 174.972 |
| 16 | 96 | Andy Houston | Ford | 30.884 | 174.848 |
| 17 | 02 | Ryan Newman | Ford | 30.884 | 174.848 |
| 18 | 88 | Dale Jarrett | Ford | 30.892 | 174.803 |
| 19 | 40 | Sterling Marlin | Dodge | 30.892 | 174.803 |
| 20 | 5 | Terry Labonte | Chevrolet | 30.908 | 174.712 |
| 21 | 93 | Dave Blaney | Dodge | 30.943 | 174.514 |
| 22 | 8 | Dale Earnhardt Jr. | Chevrolet | 30.950 | 174.475 |
| 23 | 6 | Mark Martin | Ford | 30.950 | 174.475 |
| 24 | 55 | Bobby Hamilton | Chevrolet | 30.985 | 174.278 |
| 25 | 25 | Jerry Nadeau | Chevrolet | 30.990 | 174.250 |
| 26 | 99 | Jeff Burton | Ford | 30.991 | 174.244 |
| 27 | 66 | Todd Bodine | Ford | 31.000 | 174.194 |
| 28 | 36 | Ken Schrader | Pontiac | 31.045 | 173.941 |
| 29 | 7 | Mike Wallace | Ford | 31.048 | 173.924 |
| 30 | 57 | Derrike Cope | Ford | 31.092 | 173.678 |
| 31 | 4 | Kevin Lepage | Chevrolet | 31.099 | 173.639 |
| 32 | 21 | Elliott Sadler | Ford | 31.100 | 173.633 |
| 33 | 44 | Buckshot Jones | Dodge | 31.133 | 173.449 |
| 34 | 31 | Robby Gordon | Chevrolet | 31.142 | 173.399 |
| 35 | 1 | Kenny Wallace | Chevrolet | 31.156 | 173.321 |
| 36 | 22 | Ward Burton | Dodge | 31.167 | 173.260 |
Provisionals
| 37 | 77 | Robert Pressley | Ford | 0.000 | 0.000 |
| 38 | 12 | Jeremy Mayfield | Ford | 0.000 | 0.000 |
| 39 | 33 | Joe Nemechek | Chevrolet | 0.000 | 0.000 |
| 40 | 97 | Kurt Busch | Ford | 0.000 | 0.000 |
| 41 | 15 | Michael Waltrip | Chevrolet | 0.000 | 0.000 |
| 42 | 11 | Brett Bodine | Ford | 0.000 | 0.000 |
| 43 | 90 | Hut Stricklin | Ford | 0.000 | 0.000 |
Failed to qualify
| 44 | 27 | Rick Mast | Pontiac | 31.187 | 173.149 |
| 45 | 45 | Kyle Petty | Dodge | 31.208 | 173.033 |
| 46 | 14 | Ron Hornaday Jr. | Pontiac | 31.344 | 172.282 |

== Race recap ==
The race was filled with caution flags; the first caution flag flew on the first lap when Casey Atwood, John Andretti and Ricky Craven made contact in turn 2. A total of 13 caution flags were flown along with 70 laps were run under caution, both track highs, and a red flag stopped the race for eleven minutes. Meanwhile, Wallace dominated the race, leading a race-high 117 laps. However, he was eventually penalized for speeding on the pit road. Gordon then took the lead and held off Ryan Newman for his sixth win of the season, also giving him a 222-point advantage over Ricky Rudd in the championship standings. Rudd, Wallace, and Sterling Marlin closed out the top five.

== Results ==
| Fin | St | # | Driver | Make | Team | Sponsor | Laps | Led | Status | Pts | Winnings |
|---|---|---|---|---|---|---|---|---|---|---|---|
| 1 | 2 | 24 | Jeff Gordon | Chevrolet | Hendrick Motorsports | DuPont Automotive | 267 | 53 | running | 180 | 254377 |
| 2 | 17 | 02 | Ryan Newman | Ford | Penske Racing South | Alltel | 267 | 0 | running | 170 | 100100 |
| 3 | 8 | 28 | Ricky Rudd | Ford | Robert Yates Racing | Texaco, Havoline | 267 | 20 | running | 170 | 138947 |
| 4 | 11 | 2 | Rusty Wallace | Ford | Penske Racing South | Miller Lite | 267 | 117 | running | 170 | 130140 |
| 5 | 19 | 40 | Sterling Marlin | Dodge | Chip Ganassi Racing | Proud to be an American | 267 | 1 | running | 160 | 98760 |
| 6 | 23 | 6 | Mark Martin | Ford | Roush Racing | Viagra, Pfizer | 267 | 1 | running | 155 | 109551 |
| 7 | 37 | 77 | Robert Pressley | Ford | Jasper Motorsports | Jasper Engines & Transmissions | 267 | 0 | running | 146 | 77820 |
| 8 | 7 | 20 | Tony Stewart | Pontiac | Joe Gibbs Racing | The Home Depot | 267 | 0 | running | 142 | 76150 |
| 9 | 40 | 97 | Kurt Busch | Ford | Roush Racing | Sharpie, Rubbermaid | 267 | 0 | running | 138 | 67700 |
| 10 | 21 | 93 | Dave Blaney | Dodge | Bill Davis Racing | Amoco | 267 | 1 | running | 139 | 61580 |
| 11 | 26 | 99 | Jeff Burton | Ford | Roush Racing | Citgo Supergard | 267 | 0 | running | 130 | 100046 |
| 12 | 25 | 25 | Jerry Nadeau | Chevrolet | Hendrick Motorsports | UAW-Delphi | 267 | 15 | running | 132 | 63200 |
| 13 | 31 | 4 | Kevin Lepage | Chevrolet | Morgan-McClure Motorsports | Kodak | 267 | 0 | running | 124 | 60111 |
| 14 | 34 | 31 | Robby Gordon | Chevrolet | Richard Childress Racing | Lowe's | 267 | 0 | running | 121 | 86024 |
| 15 | 24 | 55 | Bobby Hamilton | Chevrolet | Andy Petree Racing | Square D | 267 | 0 | running | 118 | 64300 |
| 16 | 15 | 29 | Kevin Harvick | Chevrolet | Richard Childress Racing | GM Goodwrench | 267 | 0 | running | 115 | 95727 |
| 17 | 35 | 1 | Kenny Wallace | Chevrolet | Dale Earnhardt, Inc. | Pennzoil | 266 | 1 | running | 117 | 78843 |
| 18 | 16 | 96 | Andy Houston | Ford | PPI Motorsports | McDonald's | 266 | 0 | running | 109 | 52300 |
| 19 | 29 | 7 | Mike Wallace | Ford | Ultra Motorsports | NationsRent | 266 | 0 | running | 106 | 64590 |
| 20 | 39 | 33 | Joe Nemechek | Chevrolet | Andy Petree Racing | Oakwood Homes | 266 | 0 | running | 103 | 83870 |
| 21 | 9 | 32 | Ricky Craven | Ford | PPI Motorsports | Tide | 265 | 0 | running | 100 | 51900 |
| 22 | 14 | 26 | Jimmy Spencer | Ford | Haas-Carter Motorsports | Kmart | 265 | 0 | running | 97 | 62175 |
| 23 | 32 | 21 | Elliott Sadler | Ford | Wood Brothers Racing | Motorcraft | 265 | 0 | running | 94 | 68800 |
| 24 | 30 | 57 | Derrike Cope | Ford | Team CLR | CLR | 263 | 0 | running | 91 | 47500 |
| 25 | 42 | 11 | Brett Bodine | Ford | Brett Bodine Racing | Ralphs | 263 | 0 | running | 88 | 51200 |
| 26 | 28 | 36 | Ken Schrader | Pontiac | MB2 Motorsports | Pedigree | 262 | 0 | running | 85 | 58100 |
| 27 | 20 | 5 | Terry Labonte | Chevrolet | Hendrick Motorsports | Kellogg's | 258 | 0 | suspension | 82 | 82130 |
| 28 | 1 | 01 | Jason Leffler | Dodge | Chip Ganassi Racing | Cingular Wireless | 256 | 8 | crash | 84 | 59700 |
| 29 | 10 | 18 | Bobby Labonte | Pontiac | Joe Gibbs Racing | Interstate Batteries | 246 | 0 | crash | 76 | 98527 |
| 30 | 18 | 88 | Dale Jarrett | Ford | Robert Yates Racing | UPS "We Want to Race the Truck" | 246 | 0 | crash | 73 | 91827 |
| 31 | 33 | 44 | Buckshot Jones | Dodge | Petty Enterprises | Georgia-Pacific | 245 | 0 | running | 70 | 54100 |
| 32 | 13 | 17 | Matt Kenseth | Ford | Roush Racing | DeWalt | 238 | 14 | crash | 72 | 53900 |
| 33 | 22 | 8 | Dale Earnhardt Jr. | Chevrolet | Dale Earnhardt, Inc. | Budweiser | 228 | 3 | crash | 69 | 80423 |
| 34 | 4 | 92 | Stacy Compton | Dodge | Melling Racing | Kodiak | 202 | 0 | crash | 61 | 45500 |
| 35 | 43 | 90 | Hut Stricklin | Ford | Donlavey Racing | Hills Brothers Coffee | 198 | 0 | running | 58 | 45300 |
| 36 | 38 | 12 | Jeremy Mayfield | Ford | Penske Racing South | Mobil 1 | 192 | 0 | running | 55 | 84384 |
| 37 | 6 | 10 | Johnny Benson Jr. | Pontiac | MBV Motorsports | Valvoline MaxLife | 184 | 0 | engine | 52 | 52900 |
| 38 | 41 | 15 | Michael Waltrip | Chevrolet | Dale Earnhardt, Inc. | NAPA Auto Parts "We Keep America Running" | 164 | 0 | crash | 49 | 54700 |
| 39 | 12 | 43 | John Andretti | Dodge | Petty Enterprises | Cheerios | 146 | 0 | running | 46 | 79527 |
| 40 | 3 | 9 | Bill Elliott | Dodge | Evernham Motorsports | Dodge Dealers, UAW | 134 | 33 | engine | 48 | 69023 |
| 41 | 36 | 22 | Ward Burton | Dodge | Bill Davis Racing | Caterpillar | 67 | 0 | crash | 40 | 77235 |
| 42 | 27 | 66 | Todd Bodine | Ford | Haas-Carter Motorsports | Kmart Blue Light Special | 67 | 0 | crash | 37 | 43900 |
| 43 | 5 | 19 | Casey Atwood | Dodge | Evernham Motorsports | Dodge Dealers, UAW | 0 | 0 | crash | 34 | 4390\50 |
Failed to qualify
| 44 | | 27 | Rick Mast | Pontiac | Eel River Racing | Save-A-Lot | | | | | |
| 45 | | 45 | Kyle Petty | Dodge | Petty Enterprises | Sprint | | | | | |
| 46 | | 14 | Ron Hornaday Jr. | Pontiac | A.J. Foyt Racing | Conseco | | | | | |

== Standings after the race ==
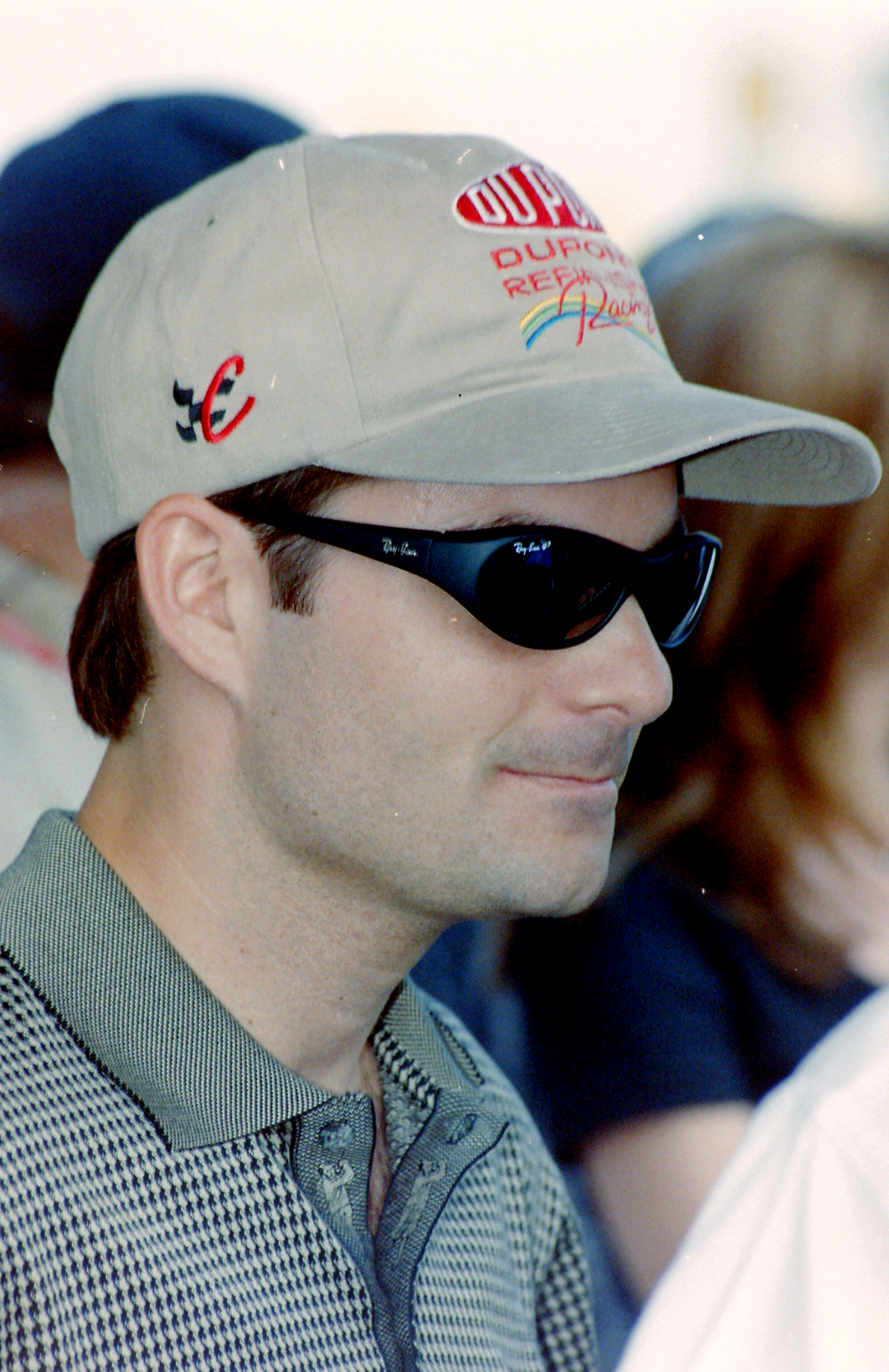
Race winner Jeff Gordon led the points standings after the race.

| Pos | Driver | Points | Differential |
|---|---|---|---|
| 1 | Jeff Gordon | 4108 | 0 |
| 2 | Ricky Rudd | 3886 | -222 |
| 3 | Tony Stewart | 3663 | -445 |
| 4 ▲ | Sterling Marlin | 3604 | -504 |
| 5 ▼ | Dale Jarrett | 3580 | -528 |
| 6 ▲ | Rusty Wallace | 3525 | -583 |
| 7 ▼ | Dale Earnhardt Jr. | 3498 | -610 |
| 8 ▼ | Kevin Harvick | 3495 | -613 |
| 9 | Bobby Labonte | 3403 | -705 |
| 10 | Johnny Benson Jr. | 3220 | -888 |

| Previous race: 2001 MBNA Cal Ripken Jr. 400 | Winston Cup Series; 2001 season | Next race: 2001 UAW-GM Quality 500 |
