= Conrad Frederick Sauer =

American pharmacist and real estate developer

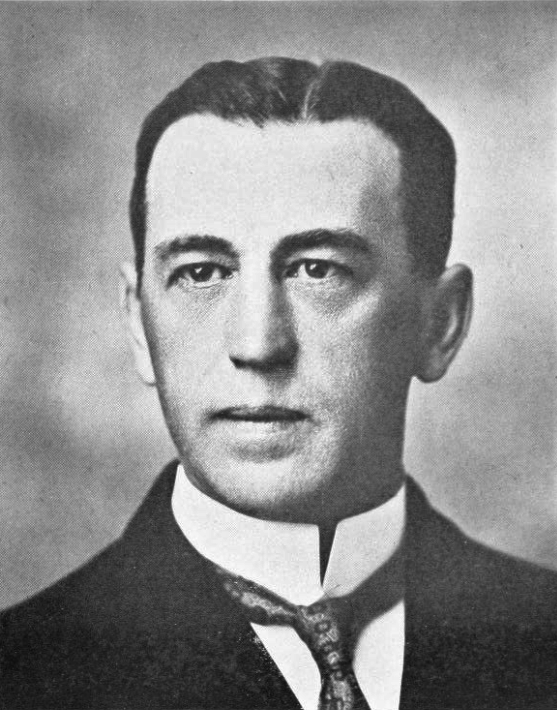
- Born: October 13, 1866; Richmond, Virginia
- Died: November 23, 1927 (aged 61); Richmond, Virginia
- Occupations: Pharmacist, businessman

Conrad Frederick Sauer (also known as Cuno F. Sauer; October 13, 1866 – November 23, 1927) was an American pharmacist from Richmond, Virginia, who founded the C.F. Sauer Company on October 13, 1887, his 21st birthday. He was also a real estate developer, and developed the Sauer's Gardens neighborhood near his factory.

== Biography ==
Conrad Frederick Sauer was born in Richmond, Virginia, on October 13, 1866. He was of German descent.

Conrad Sauer married Olga, had they had a son, Conrad Frederick Sauer Jr., and daughter Helen Sauer (Will) (? – 1994).

He died in Richmond on November 23, 1927.
