= Duke's Mayonnaise =

American brand of mayonnaise

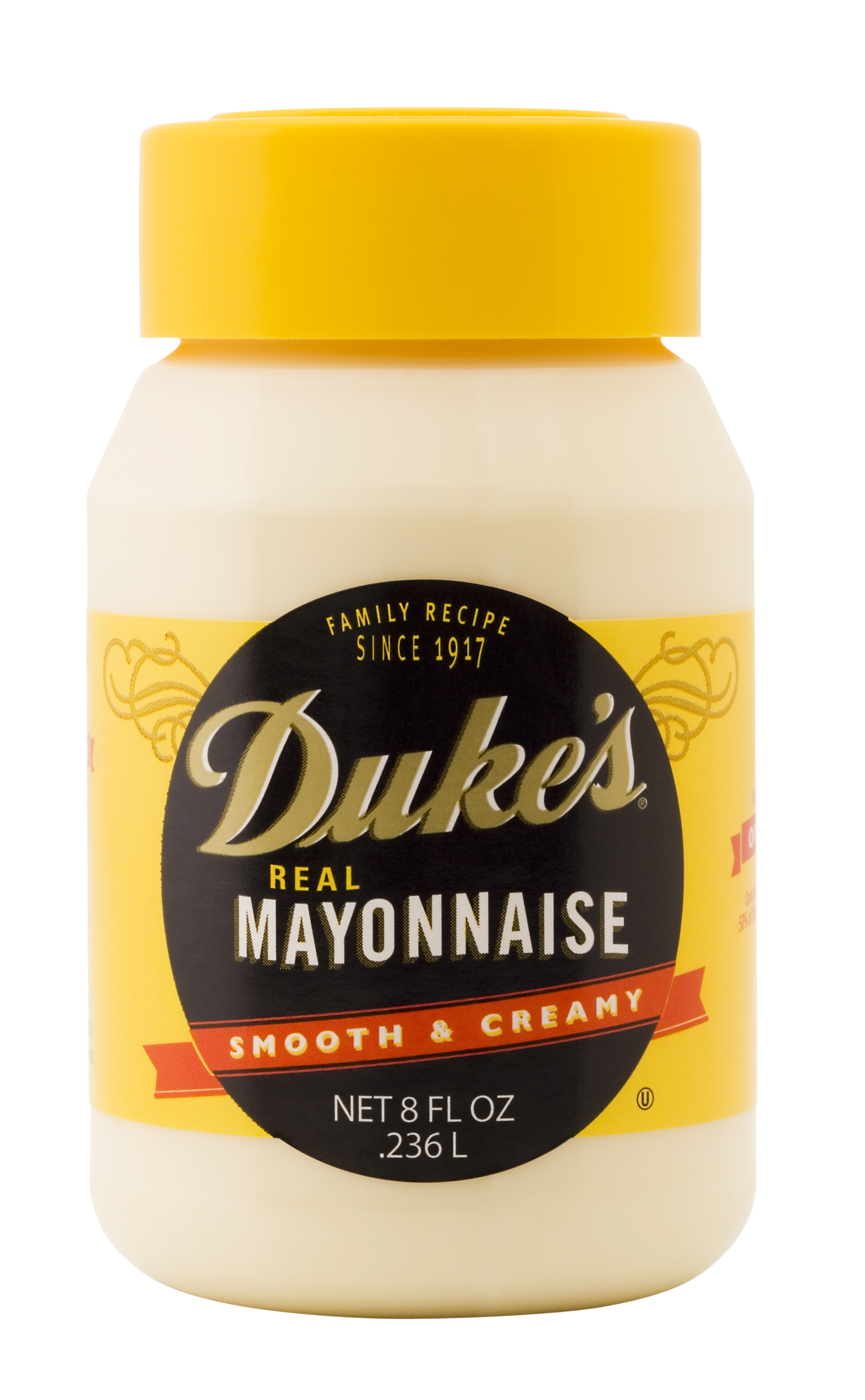
Duke's Mayonnaise

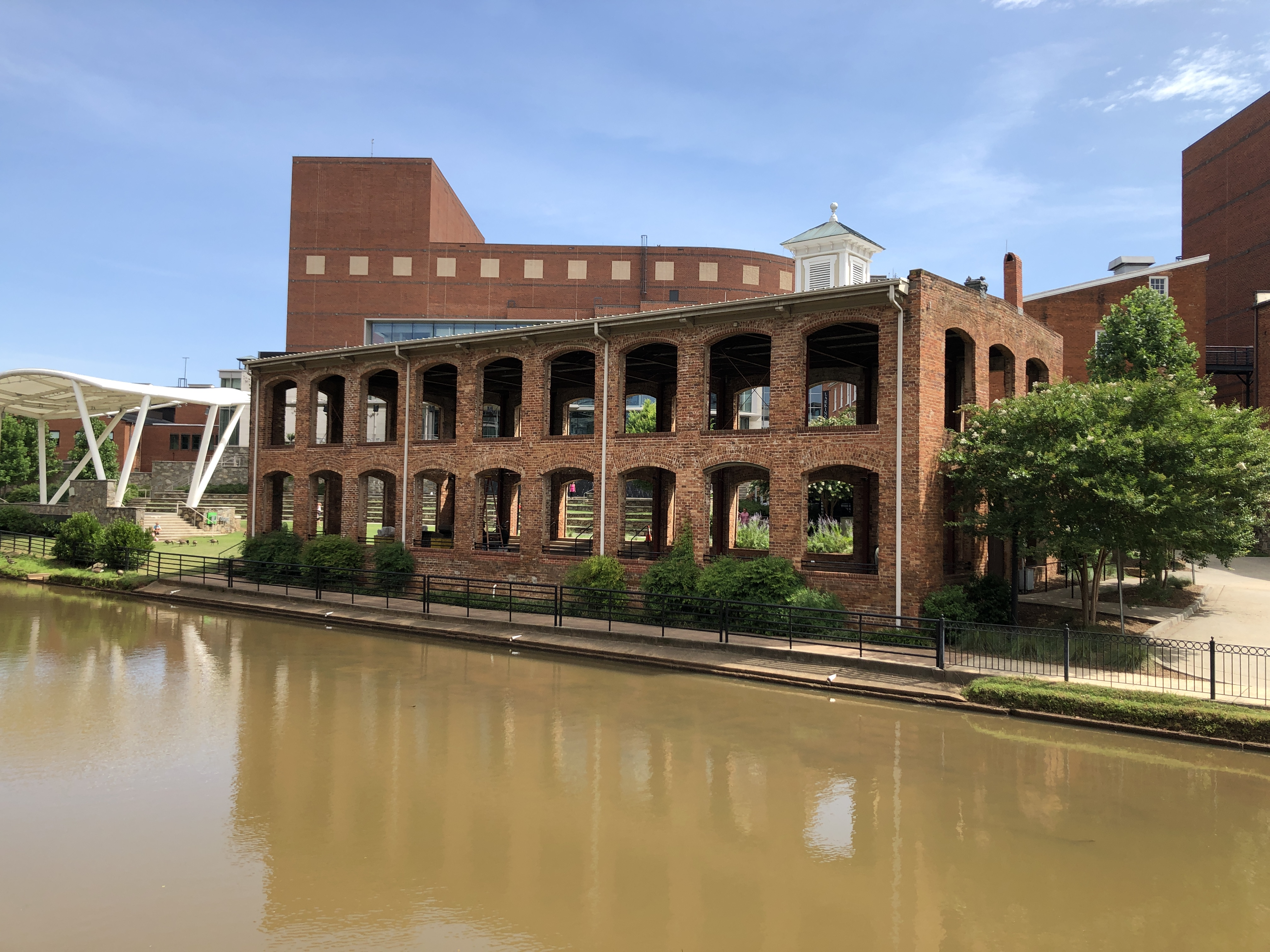
The former Duke's Mayonnaise factory in Greenville, South Carolina now the Wyche Pavilion.

Duke's Mayonnaise is a condiment that was created by Eugenia Duke in Greenville, South Carolina, in 1917.

Duke's Mayonnaise is the third-largest mayonnaise brand in the United States (behind Hellmann's and Kraft), however its popularity was at first largely limited to the South. It is used in regional favorites such as coleslaw, tomato sandwiches, deviled eggs, pimento cheese, and potato salad. Duke's Mayonnaise contains more egg yolks than other mayonnaise products and no added sugar. It also uses apple cider vinegar in place of distilled white vinegar. The combination of apple cider vinegar and the absence of added sugar give the product a tang that the company has used in its advertising, under the slogan "It's Got Twang"."

== Early history ==
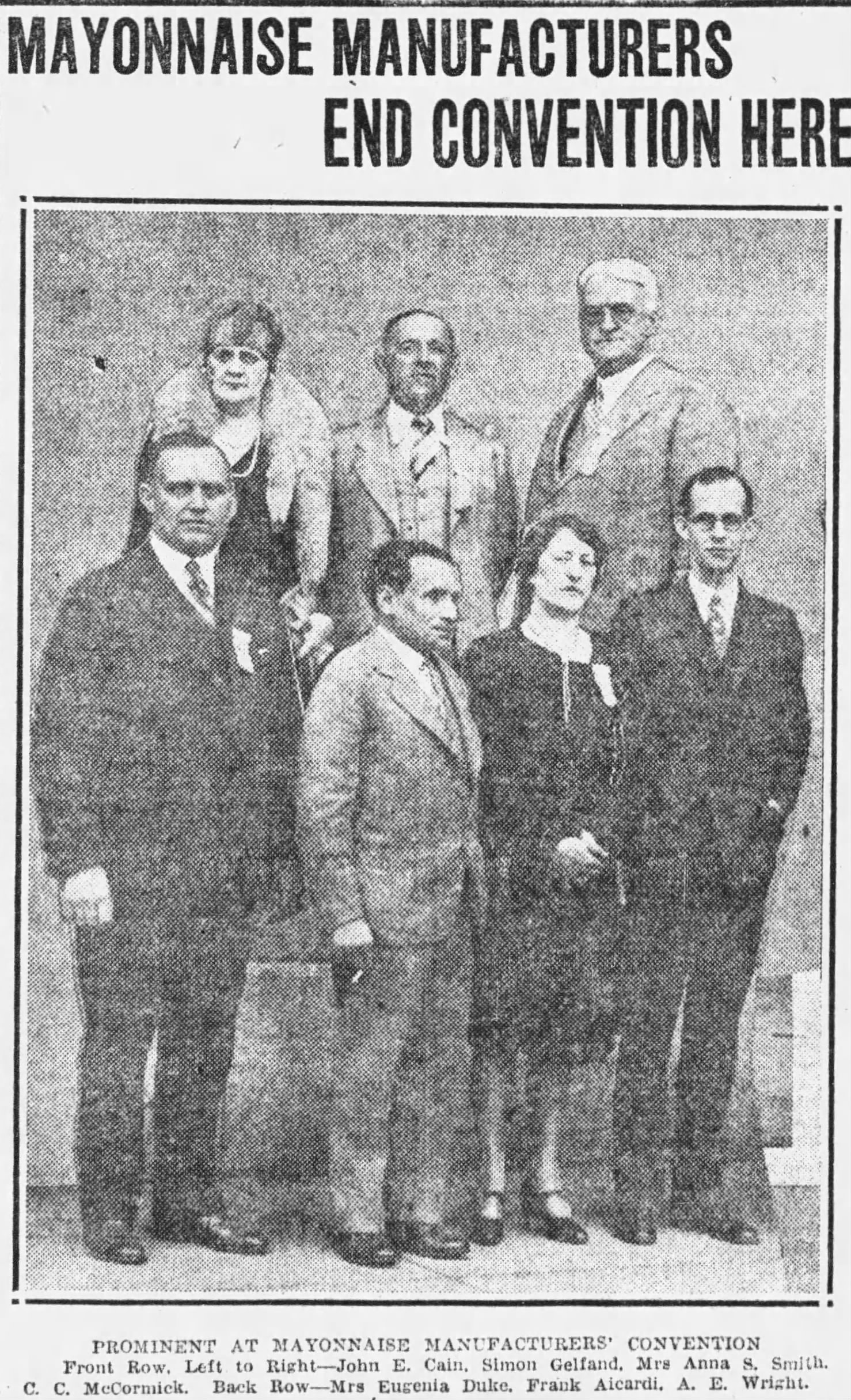
Eugenia Duke, back row, left, at Mayonnaise Manufacturers' Convention, Boston, MA 1928

In August 1917, Eugenia Duke and her daughter Martha began selling sandwiches at YMCA-run Army canteens to help make money for her family. Due to requests from soldiers at nearby Camp Sevier which was a National Guard training camp and other customers (she had quickly expanded the places to which she sold her sandwiches), she started bottling her mayonnaise around 1923. In November 1928, she was a speaker in Boston at the Mayonnaise Manufacturer's Convention. Unable to keep up with demand, she sold it to the C. F. Sauer Company in 1929.

== With C. F. Sauer ==
In 1929, the C.F. Sauer Company in Richmond, Virginia, purchased Duke's products and Duke's Mayonnaise became the company's flagship product. The plant is located in Mauldin, South Carolina which is southeast of Greenville. The facility was featured in a How It's Made episode about mayonnaise in 2011.

In 2017, the South Carolina legislature recognized the centennial of Duke's. Duke's Mayonnaise was available throughout the United States, as well as in New Zealand, Australia and the Middle East. In 2017, Sauer announced that it was also starting sales to Latin America.

In 2019, Falfurrias Capital Partners acquired C.F. Sauer and the Duke's brand. Falfurrias Capital sold Sauer Brands including Duke's to Advent International in 2025.

== Eugenia Duke ==
Eugenia Thomas Slade Duke (born October 1881 in Columbus, Georgia; died 1968) created Duke's Mayonnaise in 1917, in Greenville, South Carolina.

In 1900, when Eugenia Duke was 18, she married Harry Cuthbert Duke and moved to Greenville. She was active in working towards passage of the Nineteenth Amendment to the United States Constitution granting women the right to vote.

After the sale of the company, Eugenia Duke followed Martha, her only child, to California and opened the Duchess Sandwich Company as well as the Duchess Catering Company.

== See also ==
- Duke's Mayo Bowl
- Duke's Mayo Classic
- List of mayonnaises
