= Sauer Brands =

American cooking products company

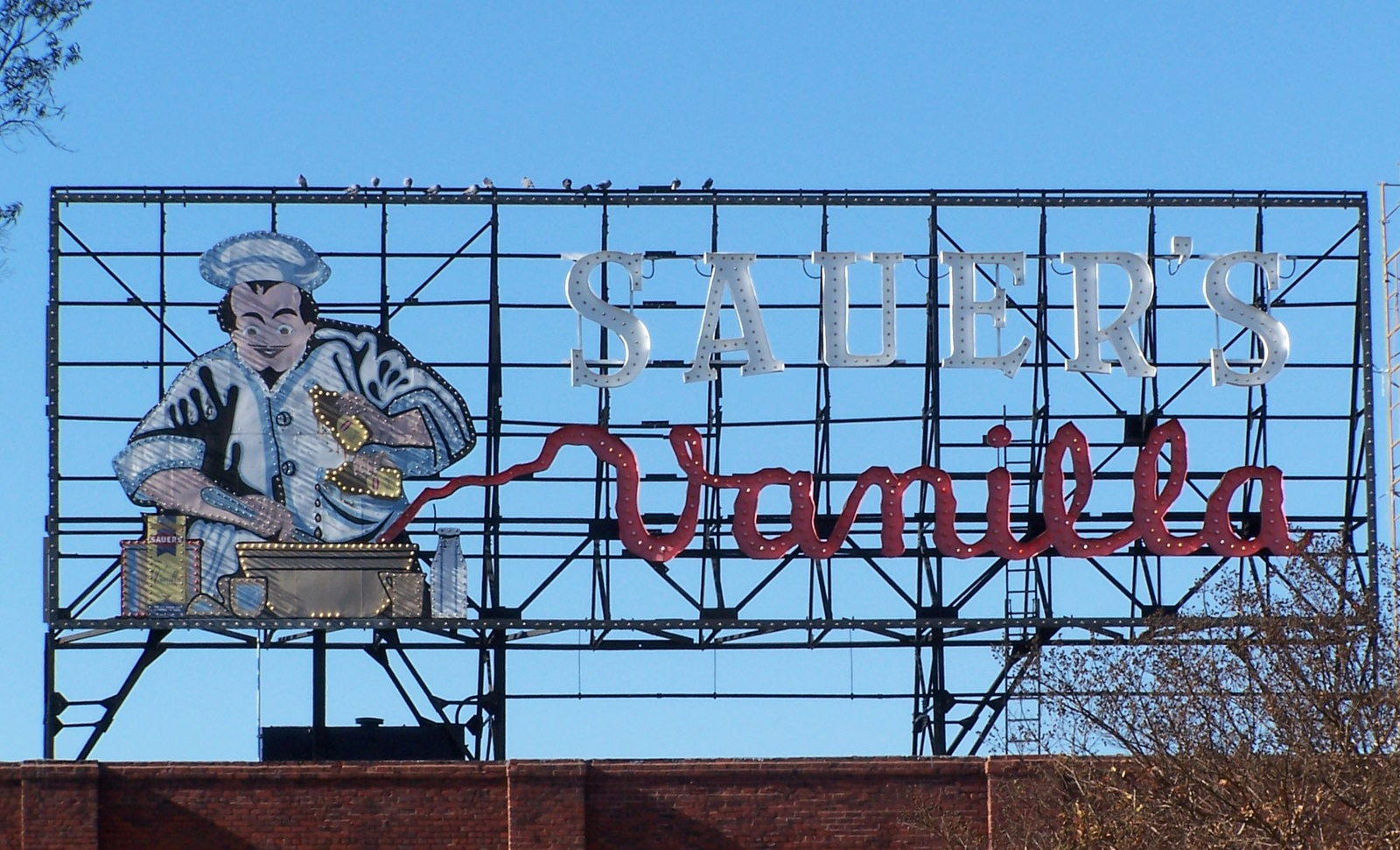
- Historic sign at the C.F. Sauer spices factory
- Industry: Food products: condiments, spices, sauces, extracts
- Founded: October 13, 1887; 139 years ago
- Founder: Conrad Frederick Sauer
- Headquarters: Richmond, Virginia, USA
- Products: Sauer's Vanilla Extract; Duke's Mayonnaise; Mateo’s Gourmet Salsa; Kernel Season's seasonings
- Owner: Advent International
- Website: sauerbrandsinc.com

Sauer Brands (also known by its founding name, C.F. Sauer Company) is an American cooking products business that makes extracts and other food products. The company was founded in 1887 by Conrad Frederick Sauer in Richmond, Virginia, where it maintains its headquarters. Its condiment facility is located in Mauldin, South Carolina (southeast of Greenville).

== History ==
C.F. Sauer Company was founded on October 13, 1887.

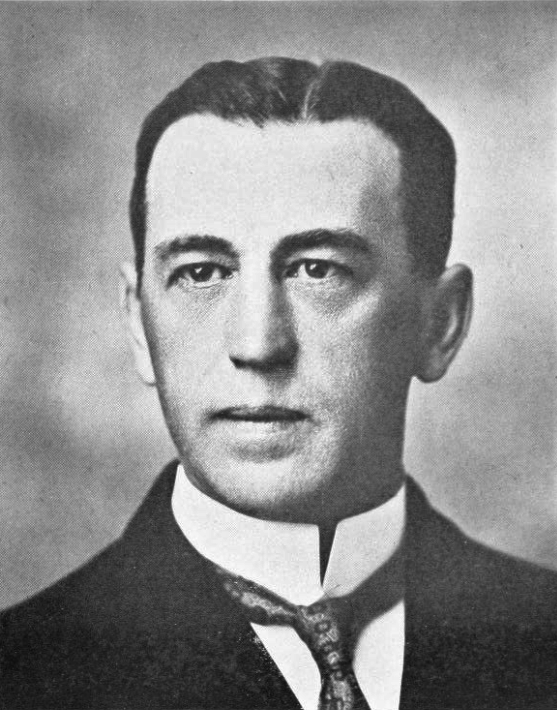
Conrad Frederick Sauer

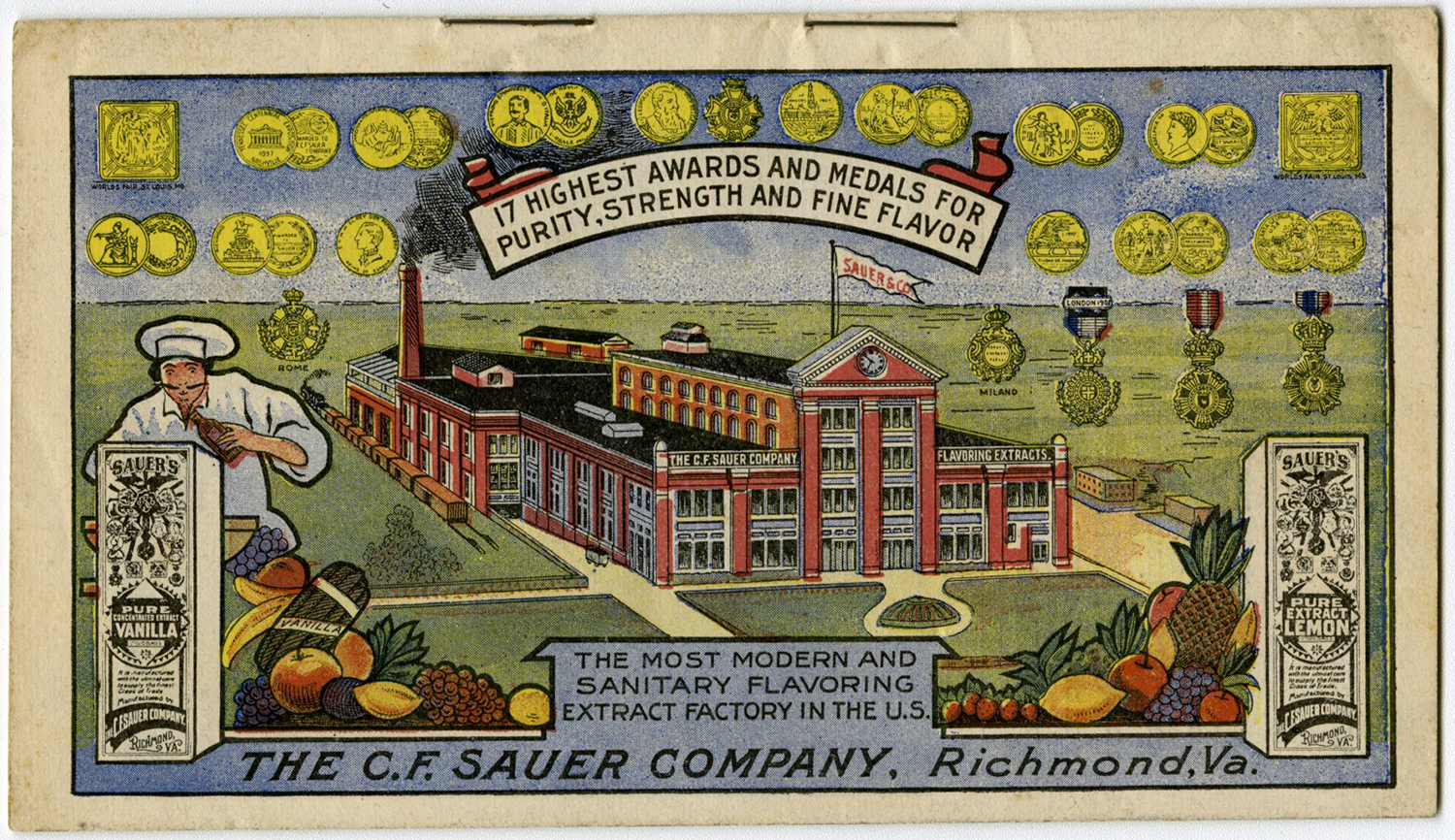
Title: Choice recipes : Sauer's famous flavoring extracts c. 1915. Source: VCU ALMA

In 1929, Sauer purchased Duke's Products Company and thus entered the mayonnaise industry. The recipe for Duke's Mayonnaise has not been altered since it went into production in 1917.

After acquiring Dean Foods and introducing Gold Medal spices in the 1950s and 1960s, the firm purchased BAMA brand mayonnaise and Spice Hunter brand exotic spices; it was the first spice company to use plastic containers.

In 1967, The C.F. Sauer Company acquired Alford's Barbecue sauce, a cider vinegar-based sauce, and rebranded it as Sauer's Barbecue Sauce. It later acquired Pleasants Hardware in 1989.

On December 28, 2015, C.F. Sauer Co. informed the employees of Pleasants Hardware that they were no longer interested in owning hardware stores. It then sold a number of Pleasants' smaller stores to a Do it Best group in Virginia Beach and gave the remaining 100+ employees in the flagship store sixty days' notice (required by law according to the WARN Act) that they would soon be unemployed.

In 2011, the firm sold its Dean Foods division to a subsidiary of Bunge Limited. On February 27, 2016, the original Pleasants Hardware closed.

After 132 years of private ownership, it was acquired in 2019 by Falfurrias Capital Partners of Charlotte, North Carolina. In February 2025, Advent International announced its acquisition of Sauer Brands.

On October 26, 2026, after the divestiture of its spice business, Sauer Brands began doing business as Duke's Mayo Company.

== Headquarters and sign ==
The present company headquarters building and main factory was opened in 1911 on West Broad Street (at its intersection with Hermitage Road) in Richmond, Virginia, helping to spur development in that area of the city. In 2011, it was listed as a contributing structure to the West Broad Street Industrial and Commercial Historic District, on the National Register of Historic Places.

Adjacent to the main headquarters building is a large advertising sign dating to the early 20th century, illuminated and animated with incandescent light bulbs, for Sauer's vanilla extract. In the 1960s, the sign was relocated to 2018 West Broad Street from an adjacent building demolished for road expansion. It is itself listed a contributing object to the historic district.
