= 2005 Pocono 500 =

Race details
- Race 14 of 36 in the 2005 NASCAR Nextel Cup Series
- The 2005 Pocono 500 program cover, featuring Jimmie Johnson.
- Date: June 12, 2005
- Official name: Pocono 500
- Location: Pocono Raceway, Long Pond, Pennsylvania.
- Course: Permanent racing facility
- Course length: 2.5 miles (4.023 km)
- Distance: 201 laps, 502.5 mi (808.695 km)
- Scheduled distance: 200 laps, 500 mi (804.672 km)
- Average speed: 129.177 miles per hour (207.890 km/h)
- Attendance: 100,000

Pole position
Driver	Michael Waltrip	Dale Earnhardt, Inc.
- Time: 53.238

Most laps led
Driver	Brian Vickers	Hendrick Motorsports
- Laps: 121

Winner
No. 99	Carl Edwards	Roush Racing

Television in the United States
- Network: FOX
- Announcers: Mike Joy, Larry McReynolds, Darrell Waltrip

The 2005 Pocono 500 was the 14th stock car race of the 2005 NASCAR Nextel Cup Series and the 24th iteration of the event. The race was held on Sunday, June 12, 2005 at Pocono Raceway in Long Pond, Pennsylvania, a 2.5 miles (4.0 km) triangular track that holds NASCAR races to this day. The race was held before a crowd of 100,000. Rookie Carl Edwards won the race under caution, his second of the season and his career after originally starting 29th, proceeding to lead 46 laps. Brian Vickers and Joe Nemechek completed the podium positions, taking 2nd and 3rd, respectively.

The layout of Pocono Raceway, the venue where the race was held.

== Background ==
Entry list
#	Driver	Team	Make	Sponsor
0	Mike Bliss	Haas CNC Racing	Chevrolet	NetZero, Best Buy
00	Carl Long	McGlynn Racing	Chevrolet	Champion Builders
01	Joe Nemechek	MB2 Motorsports	Chevrolet	U.S. Army
2	Rusty Wallace	Penske-Jasper Racing	Dodge	Miller Lite
4	Mike Wallace	Morgan–McClure Motorsports	Chevrolet	Lucas Oil Products
5	Kyle Busch	Hendrick Motorsports	Chevrolet	Kellogg's
6	Mark Martin	Roush Racing	Ford	Viagra
7	Robby Gordon	Robby Gordon Motorsports	Chevrolet	Harrah's
07	Dave Blaney	Richard Childress Racing	Chevrolet	Jack Daniel's
8	Dale Earnhardt, Jr.	Dale Earnhardt, Inc.	Chevrolet	Budweiser
9	Kasey Kahne	Evernham Motorsports	Dodge	Dodge Dealers, UAW
10	Scott Riggs	MBV Motorsports	Chevrolet	Valvoline
11	Jason Leffler	Joe Gibbs Racing	Chevrolet	FedEx, Kinko's
12	Ryan Newman	Penske-Jasper Racing	Dodge	Alltel
13	Greg Sacks	Sacks Motorsports	Dodge	Sacks Motorsports
15	Michael Waltrip	Dale Earnhardt, Inc.	Chevrolet	NAPA Auto Parts
16	Greg Biffle	Roush Racing	Ford	Post-it, National Guard
17	Matt Kenseth	Roush Racing	Ford	DeWalt Power Tools
18	Bobby Labonte	Joe Gibbs Racing	Chevrolet	Interstate Batteries, Madagascar
19	Jeremy Mayfield	Evernham Motorsports	Dodge	Dodge Dealers, UAW
20	Tony Stewart	Joe Gibbs Racing	Chevrolet	The Home Depot
21	Ricky Rudd	Wood Brothers Racing	Ford	Motorcraft Genuine Parts
22	Scott Wimmer	Bill Davis Racing	Dodge	Caterpillar
24	Jeff Gordon	Hendrick Motorsports	Chevrolet	DuPont
25	Brian Vickers	Hendrick Motorsports	Chevrolet	ditech.com, GMAC
27	Kirk Shelmerdine	Kirk Shelmerdine Racing	Ford	L. R. Lyons & Son Transportation
29	Kevin Harvick	Richard Childress Racing	Chevrolet	GM Goodwrench
31	Jeff Burton	Richard Childress Racing	Chevrolet	Cingular Wireless
32	Bobby Hamilton, Jr.	PPI Motorsports	Chevrolet	Tide
34	P.J. Jones	Mach 1 Motorsports	Chevrolet	Ultra Comp Trailers
37	Kevin Lepage	R&J Racing	Dodge	R&J Racing
38	Elliott Sadler	Robert Yates Racing	Ford	M&M's
40	Sterling Marlin	Chip Ganassi Racing with Felix Sabates	Dodge	Coors Light
41	Casey Mears	Chip Ganassi Racing with Felix Sabates	Dodge	Target
42	Jamie McMurray	Chip Ganassi Racing with Felix Sabates	Dodge	Texaco, Havoline
43	Jeff Green	Petty Enterprises	Dodge	Cheerios, Betty Crocker
44	Terry Labonte	Hendrick Motorsports	Chevrolet	Pizza Hut
45	Kyle Petty	Petty Enterprises	Dodge	Georgia-Pacific, Brawny
48	Jimmie Johnson	Hendrick Motorsports	Chevrolet	Lowe's
49	Ken Schrader	BAM Racing	Dodge	Schwan's Home Service
66	Mike Garvey	Peak Fitness Racing	Ford	Jani-King
77	Travis Kvapil	Penske-Jasper Racing	Dodge	Kodak, Jasper Engines & Transmissions
88	Dale Jarrett	Robert Yates Racing	Ford	UPS
89	Morgan Shepherd	Shepherd Racing Ventures	Dodge	Victory In Jesus, Red Line Oil
92	Hermie Sadler	Front Row Motorsports	Chevrolet	Front Row Motorsports
97	Kurt Busch	Roush Racing	Ford	Sharpie, Irwin Industrial Tools
99	Carl Edwards	Roush Racing	Ford	Stonebridge Life Insurance

== Qualifying ==
Full qualifying results
Pos.	#	Driver	Team	Make	Time	Speed
1	15	Michael Waltrip	Dale Earnhardt, Inc.	Chevrolet	53.238	169.052
2	97	Kurt Busch	Roush Racing	Ford	53.356	168.678
3	25	Brian Vickers	Hendrick Motorsports	Chevrolet	53.465	168.334
4	42	Jamie McMurray	Chip Ganassi Racing with Felix Sabates	Dodge	53.622	167.842
5	10	Scott Riggs	MBV Motorsports	Chevrolet	53.711	167.563
6	19	Jeremy Mayfield	Evernham Motorsports	Dodge	53.873	167.060
7	18	Bobby Labonte	Joe Gibbs Racing	Chevrolet	53.881	167.035
8	29	Kevin Harvick	Richard Childress Racing	Chevrolet	53.896	166.988
9	0	Mike Bliss	Haas CNC Racing	Chevrolet	53.905	166.960
10	17	Matt Kenseth	Roush Racing	Ford	53.945	166.837
11	22	Scott Wimmer	Bill Davis Racing	Dodge	53.962	166.784
12	2	Rusty Wallace	Penske-Jasper Racing	Dodge	53.982	166.722
13	6	Mark Martin	Roush Racing	Ford	53.993	166.688
14	40	Sterling Marlin	Chip Ganassi Racing with Felix Sabates	Dodge	54.038	166.549
15	9	Kasey Kahne	Evernham Motorsports	Dodge	54.049	166.516
16	88	Dale Jarrett	Robert Yates Racing	Ford	54.098	166.365
17	12	Ryan Newman	Penske-Jasper Racing	Dodge	54.106	166.340
18	01	Joe Nemechek	MB2 Motorsports	Chevrolet	54.143	166.227
19	49	Ken Schrader	BAM Racing	Dodge	54.158	166.180
20	41	Casey Mears	Chip Ganassi Racing with Felix Sabates	Dodge	54.216	166.003
21	48	Jimmie Johnson	Hendrick Motorsports	Chevrolet	54.249	165.902
22	31	Jeff Burton	Richard Childress Racing	Chevrolet	54.252	165.893
23	16	Greg Biffle	Roush Racing	Ford	54.265	165.853
24	32	Bobby Hamilton, Jr.	PPI Motorsports	Chevrolet	54.265	165.853
25	38	Elliott Sadler	Robert Yates Racing	Ford	54.296	165.758
26	20	Tony Stewart	Joe Gibbs Racing	Chevrolet	54.308	165.721
27	7	Robby Gordon	Robby Gordon Motorsports	Chevrolet	54.320	165.685
28	44	Terry Labonte	Hendrick Motorsports	Chevrolet	54.343	165.615
29	99	Carl Edwards	Roush Racing	Ford	54.364	165.551
30	11	Jason Leffler	Joe Gibbs Racing	Chevrolet	54.395	165.456
31	24	Jeff Gordon	Hendrick Motorsports	Chevrolet	54.428	165.356
32	21	Ricky Rudd	Wood Brothers Racing	Ford	54.505	165.122
33	77	Travis Kvapil	Penske-Jasper Racing	Dodge	54.544	165.004
34	8	Dale Earnhardt, Jr.	Dale Earnhardt, Inc.	Chevrolet	54.588	164.871
35	43	Jeff Green	Petty Enterprises	Dodge	54.667	164.633
36	66	Mike Garvey	Peak Fitness Racing	Ford	54.702	164.606
37	07	Dave Blaney	Richard Childress Racing	Chevrolet	54.676	164.528
38	5	Kyle Busch	Hendrick Motorsports	Chevrolet	54.705	164.519
39	37	Kevin Lepage	R&J Racing	Dodge	54.924	163.863
40	45	Kyle Petty	Petty Enterprises	Dodge	54.941	163.812
41	13	Greg Sacks	Sacks Motorsports	Dodge	55.075	163.413
42	4	Mike Wallace	Morgan–McClure Motorsports	Chevrolet	55.494	162.180
Last car to make it on time (cars not locked in by Top 35 in owner's points)
43	89	Morgan Shepherd	Shepherd Racing Ventures	Dodge	55.226	162.967
Failed to qualify
44	27	Kirk Shelmerdine	Kirk Shelmerdine Racing	Ford	55.574	161.946
45	34	P.J. Jones	Mach 1 Motorsports	Chevrolet	55.682	161.632
46	92	Hermie Sadler	Front Row Motorsports	Chevrolet	0.000	0.000
47	00	Carl Long	McGlynn Racing	Chevrolet	0.000	0.000

== Race ==
For pre-race ceremonies, the invocation was given out by Father Dan Bisco. The national anthem would be performed by the United States Army Chorus.

== Race results ==
Fin	St	#	Driver	Team	Make	Laps	Led	Status	Pts	Winnings
1	29	99	Carl Edwards	Roush Racing	Ford	201	46	running	185	$196,150
2	3	25	Brian Vickers	Hendrick Motorsports	Chevrolet	201	121	running	180	$169,075
3	18	01	Joe Nemechek	MB2 Motorsports	Chevrolet	201	0	running	165	$145,358
4	38	5	Kyle Busch	Hendrick Motorsports	Chevrolet	201	0	running	160	$120,025
5	1	15	Michael Waltrip	Dale Earnhardt, Inc.	Chevrolet	201	29	running	160	$135,239
6	21	48	Jimmie Johnson	Hendrick Motorsports	Chevrolet	201	0	running	150	$124,841
7	13	6	Mark Martin	Roush Racing	Ford	201	0	running	146	$109,125
8	8	29	Kevin Harvick	Richard Childress Racing	Chevrolet	201	0	running	142	$125,011
9	31	24	Jeff Gordon	Hendrick Motorsports	Chevrolet	201	0	running	138	$119,961
10	4	42	Jamie McMurray	Chip Ganassi Racing with Felix Sabates	Dodge	201	0	running	134	$83,875
11	12	2	Rusty Wallace	Penske-Jasper Racing	Dodge	201	0	running	130	$105,708
12	28	44	Terry Labonte	Hendrick Motorsports	Chevrolet	201	0	running	127	$66,925
13	16	88	Dale Jarrett	Robert Yates Racing	Ford	201	0	running	124	$105,333
14	6	19	Jeremy Mayfield	Evernham Motorsports	Dodge	201	0	running	121	$96,070
15	35	43	Jeff Green	Petty Enterprises	Dodge	201	0	running	118	$97,661
16	14	40	Sterling Marlin	Chip Ganassi Racing with Felix Sabates	Dodge	201	0	running	115	$94,733
17	33	77	Travis Kvapil	Penske-Jasper Racing	Dodge	201	0	running	112	$74,525
18	20	41	Casey Mears	Chip Ganassi Racing with Felix Sabates	Dodge	201	0	running	109	$90,383
19	22	31	Jeff Burton	Richard Childress Racing	Chevrolet	201	0	running	106	$92,220
20	19	49	Ken Schrader	BAM Racing	Dodge	201	1	running	108	$66,050
21	25	38	Elliott Sadler	Robert Yates Racing	Ford	201	0	running	100	$103,571
22	2	97	Kurt Busch	Roush Racing	Ford	200	2	running	102	$114,250
23	24	32	Bobby Hamilton, Jr.	PPI Motorsports	Chevrolet	200	0	running	94	$79,883
24	37	07	Dave Blaney	Richard Childress Racing	Chevrolet	200	0	running	91	$72,550
25	36	66	Mike Garvey	Peak Fitness Racing	Ford	200	1	running	93	$64,625
26	7	18	Bobby Labonte	Joe Gibbs Racing	Chevrolet	199	0	crash	85	$98,550
27	15	9	Kasey Kahne	Evernham Motorsports	Dodge	199	0	running	82	$95,550
28	32	21	Ricky Rudd	Wood Brothers Racing	Ford	199	0	running	79	$87,989
29	26	20	Tony Stewart	Joe Gibbs Racing	Chevrolet	199	0	running	76	$108,961
30	23	16	Greg Biffle	Roush Racing	Ford	198	0	running	73	$78,975
31	42	4	Mike Wallace	Morgan–McClure Motorsports	Chevrolet	198	1	running	75	$60,325
32	10	17	Matt Kenseth	Roush Racing	Ford	197	0	running	67	$108,111
33	34	8	Dale Earnhardt, Jr.	Dale Earnhardt, Inc.	Chevrolet	195	0	running	64	$108,333
34	17	12	Ryan Newman	Penske-Jasper Racing	Dodge	194	0	crash	61	$104,766
35	9	0	Mike Bliss	Haas CNC Racing	Chevrolet	194	0	running	58	$59,625
36	11	22	Scott Wimmer	Bill Davis Racing	Dodge	170	0	suspension	55	$79,063
37	5	10	Scott Riggs	MBV Motorsports	Chevrolet	165	0	running	52	$76,772
38	39	37	Kevin Lepage	R&J Racing	Dodge	141	0	crash	49	$59,100
39	27	7	Robby Gordon	Robby Gordon Motorsports	Chevrolet	124	0	engine	46	$58,975
40	30	11	Jason Leffler	Joe Gibbs Racing	Chevrolet	43	0	crash	43	$58,825
41	40	45	Kyle Petty	Petty Enterprises	Dodge	43	0	crash	40	$58,685
42	43	89	Morgan Shepherd	Shepherd Racing Ventures	Dodge	13	0	brakes	37	$58,535
43	41	13	Greg Sacks	Sacks Motorsports	Dodge	12	0	overheating	34	$58,394
Failed to qualify
44		27	Kirk Shelmerdine	Kirk Shelmerdine Racing	Ford					
45		34	P.J. Jones	Mach 1 Motorsports	Chevrolet					
46		92	Hermie Sadler	Front Row Motorsports	Chevrolet					
47		00	Carl Long	McGlynn Racing	Chevrolet					

Preceded by 2005 MBNA RacePoints 400	NASCAR Nextel Cup Season; 2005	Succeeded by 2005 Batman Begins 400
