= Carl Long =

American racing driver (born 1967)

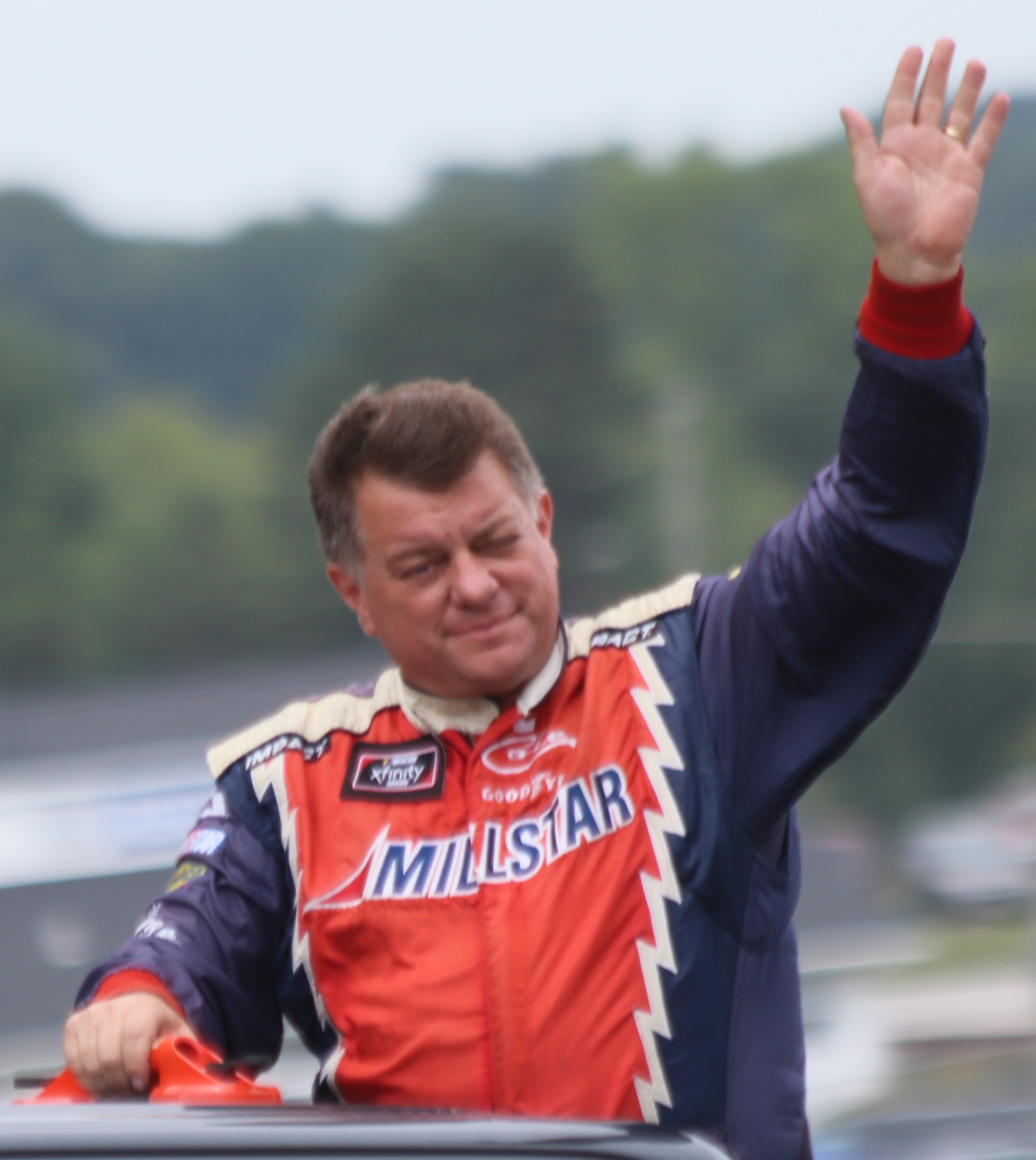
- Long at Road America in 2018
- Born: James Carlyle Long; September 20, 1967 (age 59); Roxboro, North Carolina, U.S.
- Achievements: 1987 South Boston Speedway Track Champion

NASCAR Cup Series career
- 26 races run over 7 years
- 2017 position: 62nd
- Best finish: 53rd (2005)
- First race: 2000 MBNA.com 400 (Dover)
- Last race: 2017 First Data 500 (Martinsville)
Wins	Top tens	Poles
0	0	0

NASCAR O'Reilly Auto Parts Series career
- 128 races run over 17 years
- 2020 position: 68th
- Best finish: 31st (2011)
- First race: 2001 Aaron's 312 (Atlanta)
- Last race: 2020 Draft Top 250 (Martinsville)
Wins	Top tens	Poles
0	0	0

NASCAR FedEx Freight Truck Series career
- 20 races run over 9 years
- 2013 position: 109th
- Best finish: 41st (2010)
- First race: 1998 Loadhandler 200 (Bristol)
- Last race: 2013 Chevrolet Silverado 250 (Mosport)
Wins	Top tens	Poles
0	0	0
- Statistics up to date as of November 9, 2020.

James Carlyle Long (born September 20, 1967) is an American former professional stock car racing driver, mechanic, and team owner. He last competed part-time in the NASCAR Xfinity Series, driving the No. 66 Toyota Supra for MBM Motorsports. In the past, he served as a mechanic for Mansion Motorsports, Spears Motorsports, and Travis Carter Motorsports. He was a crew chief at Front Row Motorsports for Eric McClure and Competition director at Rick Ware Racing.

== Early career ==
Long began racing in 1983 at Orange County Speedway and South Boston Speedway. He won the track championship at South Boston in 1987 and the Street Stock championship at Orange County in 1990. In 1992, he raced in NASCAR-sanctioned competition for the first time, earning Rookie of the Year honors at Orange County in the Winston Racing Series, and was awarded the Best Sportsmanship award the following season. After competing at various Winston Racing tracks in the 90's, he moved up to the Slim Jim All Pro Series in 1997, grabbing a win at Bristol Motor Speedway in the No. 15 Austin Foods Chevy.

In 1998, Long began running ARCA and Craftsman Truck races for Mansion Motorsports. Most recently, he won the championship race at Orange County Speedway on November 12, 2006.

== NASCAR career ==
=== 1999–2002 ===
Long made his NASCAR debut in 1998 in the Craftsman Truck Series. at Bristol, starting 21st but finishing 31st after the engine in his No. 91 Mansion Motorsports Ford F-150 expired.

Long began running the Cup races in 1999 with the No. 85 Mansion Motorsports team, but DNQ'd for every attempt throughout that year. He ran Bristol again the following year, in the Truck Series posting a career-best ninth place qualifying effort, as well as at Louisville Speedway, where he wrecked very early in the race. After more struggles in 2000, he finally qualified to make his Cup Series debut in one of its most prestigious races, the Coca-Cola 600. However, Darrell Waltrip, one of the top drivers in series history, who was retiring at the end of the 2000 season, failed to qualify. Long gave up his ride to Waltrip for the race. He made another truck race in 2000 at Texas, where he started 33rd but finished seventeenth in a truck fielded by Team 23 Racing. Long would eventually make his Cup debut at Dover, qualifying 42nd but finishing 41st after a crash on lap twelve. He made one more start that year, at Rockingham Speedway, finishing 32nd. He ran three races in 2001, his best finish being a 29th at the UAW-GM Quality 500. He also made his Busch Series debut in 2001 in the Aaron's 312 at Atlanta. Driving the No. 49 for Jay Robinson Racing, Carl started 41st but came across handling problems during the race, relegating him to 42nd.

In 2002, Long ran for Rookie of the Year, but failed to earn the award mainly due to an incomplete season. Long attempted a group of the races, but failed to qualify for all except two. He started the season with Mansion Motorsports again, but when that team ran out of money, Long departed the team, originally to Glenn Racing, then to Ware Racing Enterprises, and then finally the No. 59 Foster Price team, with whom he finished 39th at Atlanta Motor Speedway. In addition, he had a sixteenth-place start at Dover for Mansion in the Truck Series (during which Long ran in the top-ten before an engine failure), and a thirtieth-place finish at Richmond for Rick Ware in the Revival Soy truck.

=== 2003–2014 ===
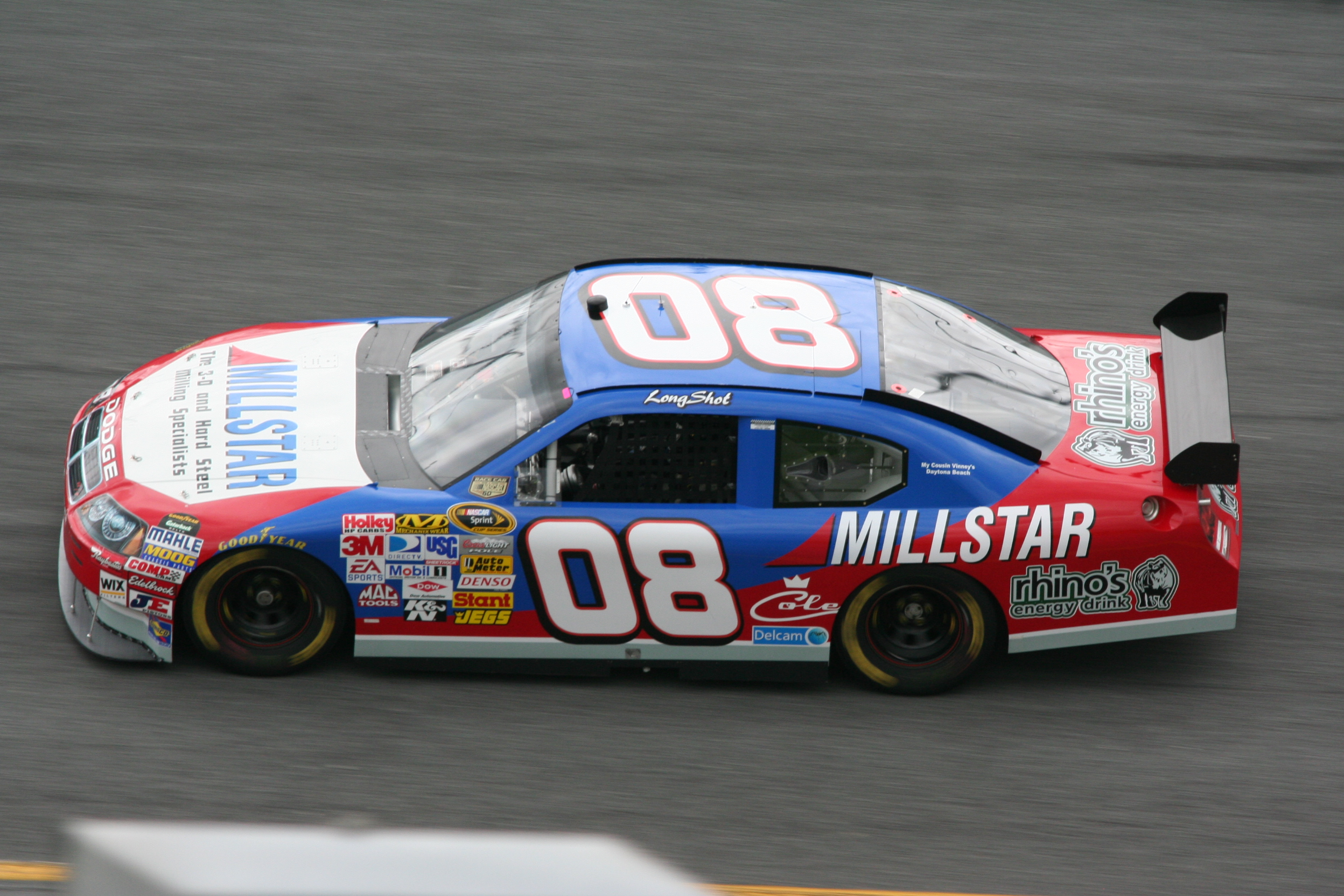
2008 racecar

Long made two Busch races in 2003 for Robert Creech, his best finish a 28th at Rockingham. He had another 28th at Rockingham the following year, as well as running the No. 07 for Moy Racing at Loudon, where his engine expired early in the race. He also ran another race for Ware at New Hampshire, but finished last. He made his first race as a team owner that season, when Matt Carter drove his No. 96 truck to a seventeenth-place finish at Martinsville Speedway. After failing to make a Cup race in 2003, Long returned to the Glenn Racing Dodge in 2004. In their first race together, Long's car flipped several times in a violent accident at the Subway 400, the final Cup race ever held at North Carolina Speedway in Rockingham, North Carolina. Long was uninjured and returned to the series in the following Cup event at Las Vegas Motor Speedway, driving for fellow independent Hermie Sadler. Long then drove at Pocono Raceway for the McGlynn Racing operation, finishing 41st. After a final race for Glenn he ran two races with Hover Motorsports.

Long announced he would merge his No. 46 team with the McGlynn Racing team to run in 2005. Although he drove only the No. 00 from McGlynn, Long ran nine races that year, and had a career-best qualifying effort of 20th at Atlanta. However, sponsors wanted 1990 Daytona 500 winner Derrike Cope to drive the car, which forced McGlynn to release Long. Long closed out the year running at Homestead–Miami Speedway in a personally owned chassis originally purchased from Petty Enterprises. The car was prepared in Stan Hover's shop with mostly volunteers, and a leased motor from Bill Davis Racing was dropped into the car. However, a crash in qualifying ended his weekend prematurely. That season Long was also announced as a driver for a new team, Victory Motorsports, owned by Terance Mathis, but the team never ran.

In 2006, Long ran the No. 80 for Hover Motorsports at the Daytona 500, but missed the race. He attempted three races for R&J Racing but also failed to qualify for those events. He returned to the Busch Series, driving the No. 23 for Keith Coleman Racing in six races before being replaced, and also ran a Truck Series race for Jim Rosenblum Racing. He attempted a race at Bristol with Long Brothers Racing, but did not qualify. Long joined a new Nextel Cup team, Cupp Motorsports, in the No. 46 Millstar Tools-sponsored Dodge. Long attempted three races for Cupp, but failed to qualify for each of them. He returned with help from McGlynn to attempt the Ford 400 at the end of 2006, but did not make the race.

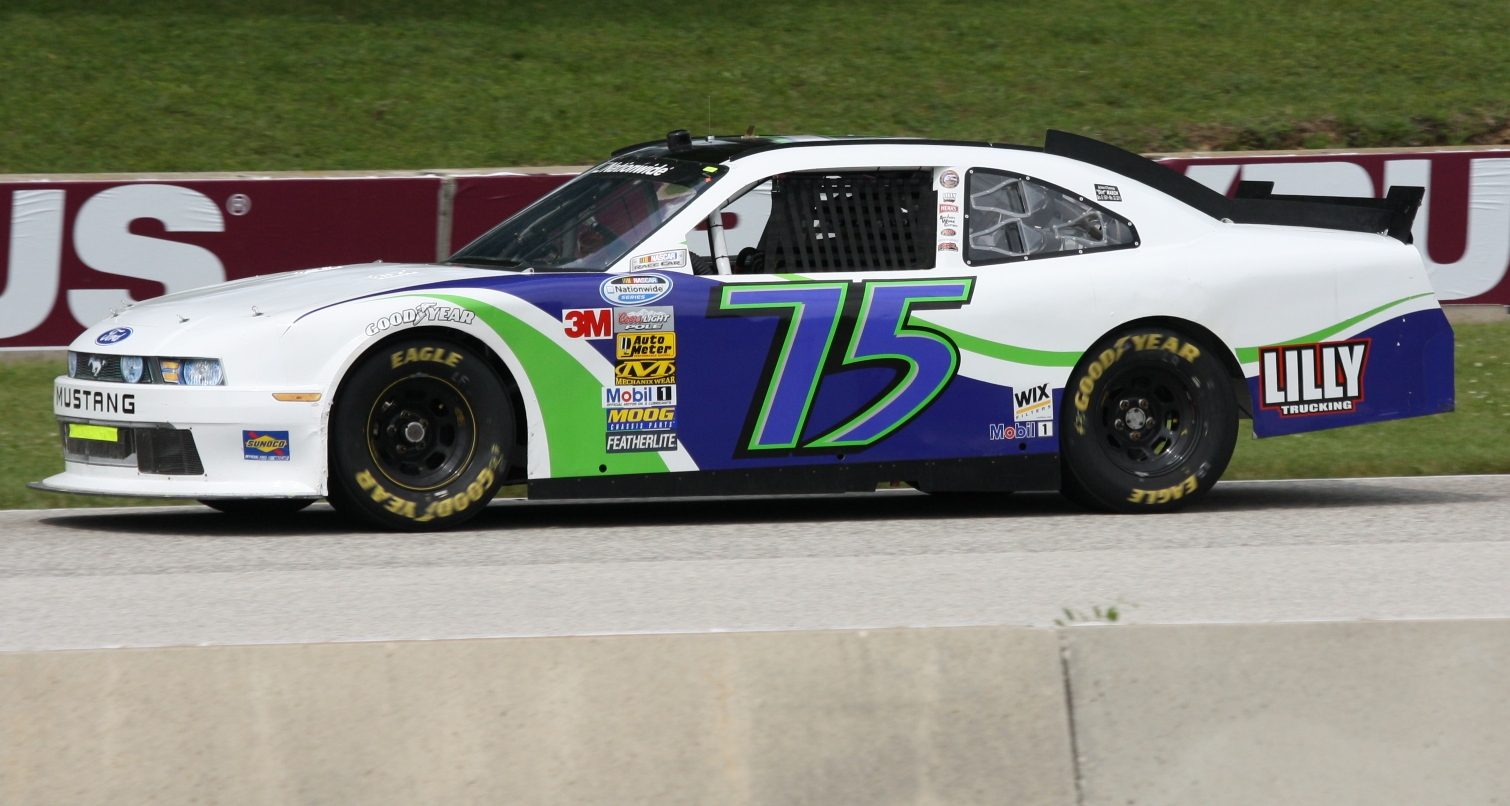
Long in his 2011 Nationwide car at Road America

In 2007, Long ran a limited schedule for Long Brothers Racing in the USAR Hooters Pro Cup Series, posting a best finish of second. He ran two races for Carter 2 Motorsports in the Busch Series, before the team closed down. He attempted the 2008 Daytona 500 for E&M Motorsports with sponsorship from Millstar and Rhino's Energy Drink, but did not qualify. He began fielding his own car with Red Line Oil sponsoring in the Nationwide Series, making his first start of the season at Darlington Raceway.

Long attempted the 2009 Daytona 500 with sponsorship from Romeo Guest Construction, one of Long's first sponsors in the mid-1990s when he was competing in Late Models.

In May 2009, Long was fined $200,000 after his engine was discovered to be 0.17 cubic inches over the regulation size during practice for the Sprint Showdown. It was the largest fine in NASCAR history until 2013, when Michael Waltrip Racing was fined $300,000 for allegedly manipulating the outcome of the Federated Auto Parts 400. In addition to the fine, Long's team was penalized two-hundred driver and two-hundred owner points, suspended for twelve Cup races, suspended from all NASCAR races until August 18, and placed on probation until December 31. Because Long was unable to pay the fine, he was barred from participating in the Cup series. Prior to his suspension, he was a crew member on the No. 34 Front Row Motorsports Cup team. He has driven for numerous independent teams in the Sprint Cup, Nationwide Series, and Camping World Truck Series, as well as the Auto Racing Club of America. In 2010, Long was named to drive the No. 01 Chevrolet for Daisy Ramirez's Truck Series team and the No. 68 Nationwide Series car for Fleur-de-lis Motorsports. From 2011 to 2013, he primarily drove for Rick Ware Racing in the Nationwide Series.

In 2014, Long partnered with Derek White to form Motorsports Business Management, fielding a team in the Nationwide Series under the name MBM Motorsports. The team made its debut at Bristol with Matt Carter as driver of the No. 13. For six more races in 2014, Long fielded rides for himself, White, and Mike Wallace, failing to qualify for four and not finishing all six races they had qualified.

=== 2017–present ===
In May 2017, Long announced he had reached an agreement with NASCAR to allow him to return to the Cup Series garage. He also declared his intention to field the No. 66 Chevrolet SS at the Go Bowling 400 in Kansas under the MBM Motorsports banner. The number was selected as tribute to MBM driver Mark Thompson, while the paint scheme was nearly identical to the No. 46 car Long drove in the Cup Series prior to his ban from the Cup garage in 2009; the green and yellow colors remained, though the red roof number was changed to yellow. Although the team received sponsorship from marijuana vaping manufacturer Veedverks, NASCAR prevented the company from appearing on the car after Long misspelled the company name in his sponsor submission to NASCAR, spelling it with an "o" instead of a "d"; upon further investigation by NASCAR, the sanctioning body ordered Long to remove the sponsorship. Long missed the first practice session before running 14 laps in the second session, followed by being unable to set a qualifying lap as he was one of 11 cars stuck in inspection during the session. This relegated Long to a 40th-place starting spot, from which he finished 31st.

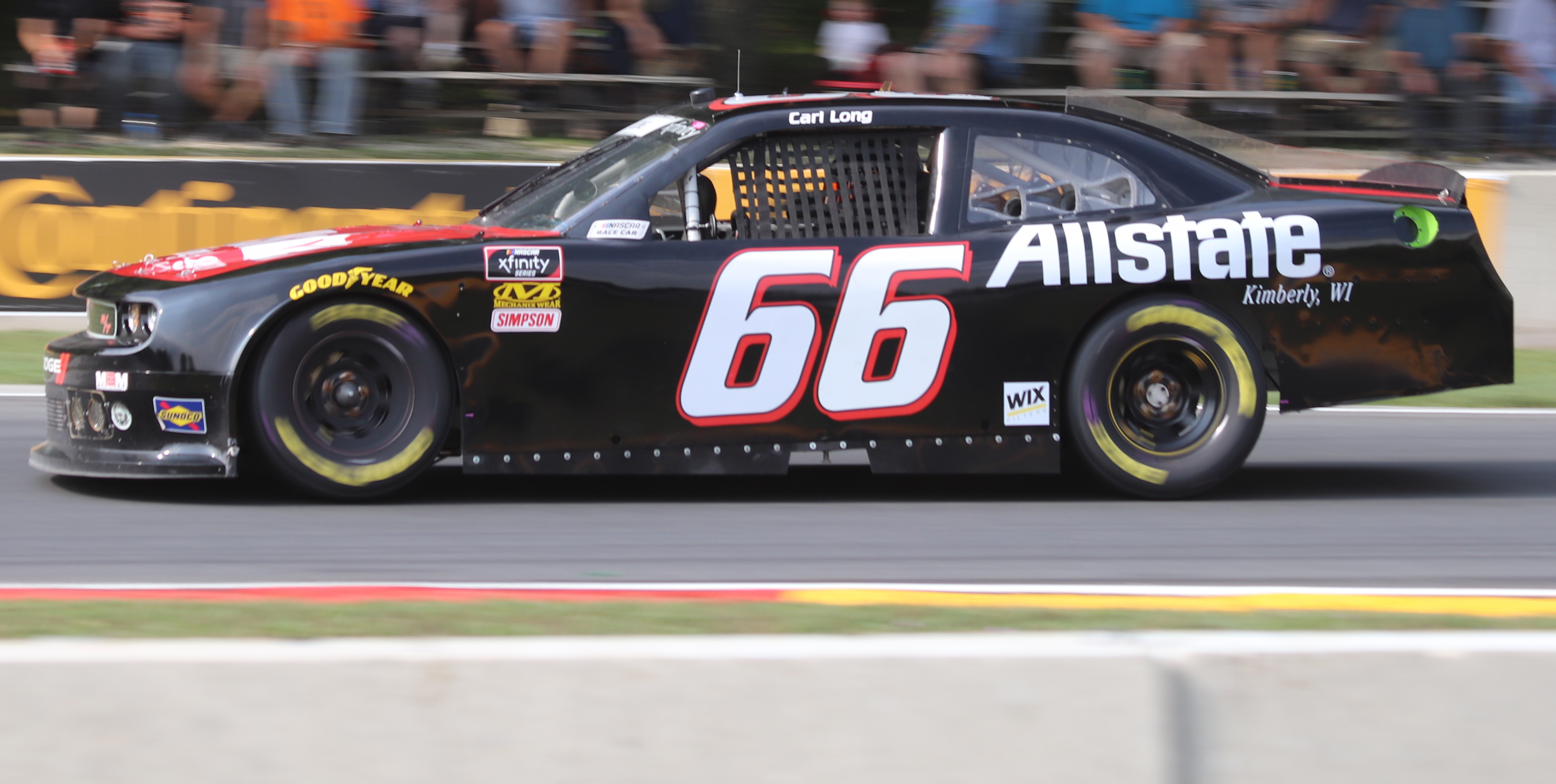
2018 Xfinity car at Road America

In 2014, Long co-started MBM Motorsports with driver Derek White, before White was arrested on smuggling charges. Since 2016, Long has owned MBM Motorsports. The team competes part time in the NASCAR Cup Series, NASCAR Craftsman Truck Series, and ARCA Menards Series.

In February 2021, Long called Noah Gragson an "over-entitled mouthpiece who did not have the talent to avoid the wreck." This was in response to Gragson calling his driver, David Starr, a "dipshit" after Gragson ran into him after Starr blew a tire. Following the season finale weekend at Phoenix, Long, Starr, and seven team members tested positive for COVID-19.

Long is considered a 'working man's' driver, having competed in professional racing without financial support from family corporate sponsors .

== Personal life ==
Long was a former manager at a Raleigh/Durham Domino's Pizza, where he was named manager of the year in 1988. He has a wife and 4 kids. Additionally, he holds the record for most pizzas delivered in one night at that location.

== Motorsports career results ==
=== NASCAR ===
(key) (Bold – Pole position awarded by qualifying time. Italics – Pole position earned by points standings or practice time. * – Most laps led.)

==== Monster Energy Cup Series ====
Monster Energy NASCAR Cup Series results
Year	Team	No.	Make	1	2	3	4	5	6	7	8	9	10	11	12	13	14	15	16	17	18	19	20	21	22	23	24	25	26	27	28	29	30	31	32	33	34	35	36	MENCS	Pts	Ref
1999	Mansion Motorsports	85	Ford	DAY	CAR	LVS	ATL	DAR	TEX	BRI	MAR	TAL	CAL	RCH	CLT; DNQ	DOV	MCH	POC	SON	DAY	NHA	POC	IND	GLN	MCH	BRI	DAR	RCH	NHA	DOV	MAR	CLT	TAL	CAR	PHO	HOM	ATL			NA	-	
2000	Mansion Motorsports	85	Ford	DAY; DNQ	CAR	LVS	ATL	DAR	BRI	TEX	MAR	TAL	CAL	RCH	CLT; QL^{†}	DOV; DNQ	MCH	POC	SON	DAY	NHA	POC; DNQ	IND	GLN	MCH; DNQ	BRI; DNQ	DAR	RCH	NHA	DOV; 41	MAR; DNQ	CLT; DNQ	TAL	CAR; 32	PHO	HOM	ATL; DNQ			62nd	107	
2001	Mansion Motorsports	85	Ford	DAY; DNQ	CAR	LVS	ATL; DNQ	DAR	BRI; DNQ	TEX	MAR	TAL	CAL	RCH	CLT; DNQ	DOV	MCH	POC	SON	DAY	CHI	NHA	POC; DNQ	IND	GLN	MCH	BRI; DNQ	DAR	RCH; DNQ	DOV	KAN		MAR; DNQ	TAL	PHO		HOM; DNQ			55th	147	
2001	Mansion Motorsports	85	Dodge																													CLT; 29				CAR; 42		ATL; 43	NHA	55th	147	
2002	Mansion Motorsports	85	Dodge	DAY; DNQ			ATL; DNQ	DAR	BRI	TEX	MAR	TAL	CAL	RCH	CLT; DNQ	DOV	POC; 42	MCH	SON	DAY	CHI	NHA																		79th	46	
2002	Mansion Motorsports	85	Ford		CAR; DNQ	LVS																																		79th	46	
2002	SR Racing	79	Dodge																				POC; DNQ	IND	GLN	MCH														79th	46	
2002	Ware Racing Enterprises	51	Dodge																								BRI; DNQ	DAR; DNQ	RCH; DNQ	NHA; DNQ	DOV	KAN; DNQ	TAL							79th	46	
2002	Price Motorsports	59	Dodge																															CLT; DNQ	MAR; DNQ	ATL; 39	CAR; DNQ	PHO	HOM; DNQ	79th	46	
2003	Glenn Racing	46	Dodge	DAY	CAR	LVS	ATL	DAR	BRI	TEX	TAL	MAR	CAL	RCH	CLT	DOV	POC	MCH	SON	DAY	CHI	NHA; DNQ	POC	IND	GLN	MCH	BRI	DAR	RCH	NHA; DNQ	DOV	TAL	KAN	CLT	MAR	ATL	PHO	CAR	HOM	NA	-	
2004	Glenn Racing	46	Dodge	DAY	CAR; 38										CLT; DNQ	DOV						NHA; 42								NHA; DNQ					MAR; DNQ	ATL	PHO			58th	267	
2004	SCORE Motorsports	02	Pontiac			LVS; 38	ATL	DAR	BRI	TEX	MAR	TAL	CAL	RCH																										58th	267	
2004	McGlynn Racing	00	Dodge														POC; 41	MCH; DNQ	SON	DAY	CHI																	DAR; DNQ		58th	267	
2004	McGlynn Racing	00	Chevy																												DOV; DNQ		KAN; DNQ							58th	267	
2004	Hover Motorsports	80	Ford																				POC; 39	IND	GLN	MCH; 39	BRI	CAL				TAL; DNQ							HOM; DNQ	58th	267	
2004	Hover Motorsports	08	Ford																										RCH; DNQ											58th	267	
2004	McGlynn Racing	08	Chevy																															CLT; DNQ						58th	267	
2005	McGlynn Racing	00	Chevy	DAY	CAL	LVS; DNQ	ATL; DNQ	BRI; 42	MAR; DNQ	TEX	PHO; 43	TAL		RCH; DNQ	CLT; DNQ	DOV; 42	POC; DNQ	MCH	SON	DAY		NHA; 43	POC; DNQ	IND	GLN				RCH; DNQ		DOV; 42	TAL					TEX; DNQ	PHO		53rd	356	
2005	McGlynn Racing	80	Chevy										DAR; 42														BRI; 32	CAL												53rd	356	
2005	McGlynn Racing	00	Dodge																		CHI; 40									NHA; DNQ			KAN; DNQ		MAR; DNQ	ATL; 32				53rd	356	
2005	McGlynn Racing	80	Dodge																							MCH; DNQ								CLT; DNQ						53rd	356	
2005	Hover Motorsports	80	Dodge																																				HOM; DNQ	53rd	356	
2006	Hover Motorsports	80	Ford	DAY; DNQ	CAL	LVS	ATL	BRI	MAR	TEX	PHO	TAL	RCH																											72nd	40	
2006	R&J Racing	37	Dodge											DAR; DNQ	CLT; DNQ			MCH; DNQ	SON	DAY																				72nd	40	
2006	Front Row Motorsports	34	Chevy													DOV; DNQ	POC				CHI; DNQ	NHA	POC	IND	GLN	MCH	BRI; 41	CAL	RCH											72nd	40	
2006	Cupp Motorsports	46	Dodge																											NHA; DNQ	DOV	KAN; DNQ	TAL	CLT; DNQ	MAR	ATL	TEX	PHO	HOM; DNQ	72nd	40	
2007	E&M Motorsports	08	Dodge	DAY	CAL	LVS	ATL	BRI	MAR	TEX	PHO	TAL	RCH	DAR	CLT	DOV	POC	MCH	SON	NHA	DAY	CHI	IND	POC	GLN	MCH	BRI	CAL	RCH	NHA	DOV	KAN	TAL	CLT; DNQ	MAR	ATL	TEX	PHO	HOM	NA	-	
2008	E&M Motorsports	08	Dodge	DAY; DNQ	CAL	LVS	ATL	BRI	MAR	TEX	PHO	TAL	RCH	DAR	CLT	DOV	POC	MCH	SON	NHA	DAY	CHI	IND	POC	GLN	MCH	BRI	CAL	RCH											77th	0	
2008	Carl Long Racing	46	Dodge																											NHA; DNQ	DOV	KAN	TAL	CLT	MAR	ATL	TEX	PHO	HOM	77th	0	
2009	Carl Long Racing	46	Dodge	DAY; DNQ	CAL	LVS	ATL	BRI	MAR	TEX	PHO	TAL	RCH	DAR	CLT	DOV	POC	MCH	SON	NHA	DAY	CHI	IND	POC	GLN	MCH	BRI	ATL	RCH	NHA	DOV	KAN	CAL	CLT	MAR	TAL	TEX	PHO	HOM	85th	-200	
2017	MBM Motorsports	66	Chevy	DAY	ATL	LVS	PHO	CAL	MAR	TEX	BRI	RCH	TAL	KAN; 31	CLT	DOV	POC	MCH	SON	DAY	KEN	NHA	IND	POC	GLN	MCH	BRI	DAR; 33	RCH	CHI	NHA	DOV	CLT	TAL	KAN	MAR; 36	TEX	PHO	HOM	62nd	0^{1}	
^{†} – Qualified, but spot bought by Darrell Waltrip.

===== Daytona 500 =====
Year	Team	Manufacturer	Start	Finish
2000	Mansion Motorsports	Ford	DNQ	
2001	Mansion Motorsports	Ford	DNQ	
2002	Mansion Motorsports	Dodge	DNQ	
2006	Hover Motorsports	Ford	DNQ	
2008	E&M Motorsports	Dodge	DNQ	
2009	Carl Long Racing	Dodge	DNQ	

==== Xfinity Series ====
NASCAR Xfinity Series results
Year	Team	No.	Make	1	2	3	4	5	6	7	8	9	10	11	12	13	14	15	16	17	18	19	20	21	22	23	24	25	26	27	28	29	30	31	32	33	34	35	NXSC	Pts	Ref
1999	Sadler Brothers Racing	95	Chevy	DAY	CAR	LVS	ATL	DAR	TEX	NSV	BRI	TAL	CAL	NHA	RCH	NZH	CLT	DOV	SBO	GLN	MLW	MYB	PPR	GTY	IRP	MCH	BRI; DNQ	DAR	RCH	DOV	CLT	CAR	MEM	PHO	HOM				NA	-	
2001	Jay Robinson Racing	49	Chevy	DAY	CAR	LVS	ATL; 42	DAR	BRI	TEX	NSH	TAL	CAL	RCH	NHA	NZH	CLT	DOV	KEN	MLW	GLN	CHI	GTY	PPR	IRP	MCH	BRI	DAR	RCH	DOV	KAN	CLT	MEM	PHO	CAR	HOM			146th	37	
2002	Glenn Racing	64	Dodge	DAY	CAR	LVS	DAR	BRI	TEX	NSH	TAL	CAL	RCH	NHA	NZH	CLT; DNQ	DOV	NSH	KEN	MLW	DAY	CHI	GTY	PPR	IRP	MCH	BRI	DAR	RCH	DOV	KAN								NA	-	
2002	Creech Motorsports	22	Dodge																													CLT; DNQ	MEM	ATL	CAR	PHO	HOM		NA	-	
2003	Creech Motorsports	13	Dodge	DAY	CAR; 28	LVS	DAR	BRI	TEX	TAL	NSH	CAL	RCH; 39	GTY	NZH	CLT	DOV	NSH	KEN	MLW	DAY	CHI	NHA	PPR	IRP	MCH	BRI	DAR	RCH	DOV	KAN	CLT	MEM	ATL	PHO	CAR	HOM		114th	125	
2004	Long Brothers Racing	83	Ford	DAY	CAR; 28	LVS	DAR	BRI	TEX	NSH	TAL	CAL	GTY	RCH	NZH	CLT	DOV	NSH	KEN	MLW	DAY																		109th	119	
2004	Moy Racing	07	Ford																			CHI; DNQ	NHA; 41	PPR	IRP														109th	119	
2004	Moy Racing	77	Ford																							MCH; QL^{†}	BRI	CAL	RCH	DOV	KAN	CLT	MEM	ATL	PHO				109th	119	
2004	Long Brothers Racing	83	Dodge																																	DAR; DNQ	HOM		109th	119	
2006	Keith Coleman Racing	23	Chevy	DAY	CAL	MXC	LVS	ATL	BRI	TEX	NSH	PHO	TAL	RCH	DAR	CLT	DOV	NSH; 41	KEN	MLW	DAY	CHI; DNQ	NHA; 38	MAR; 41	GTY; 34														89th	224	
2006	Keith Coleman Racing	26	Chevy																							IRP; 43	GLN	MCH											89th	224	
2006	Long Brothers Racing	89	Ford																										BRI; DNQ	CAL	RCH	DOV	KAN	CLT	MEM	TEX	PHO	HOM	89th	224	
2007	Fridel-Carter Motorsports	54	Dodge	DAY	CAL	MXC	LVS	ATL	BRI	NSH	TEX	PHO	TAL	RCH	DAR	CLT	DOV	NSH	KEN	MLW	NHA	DAY	CHI	GTY	IRP	CGV	GLN	MCH	BRI	CAL	RCH	DOV; 33	KAN	CLT; 41	MEM; DNQ	TEX	PHO	HOM	126th	104	
2008	Carl Long Racing	46	Dodge	DAY	CAL	LVS	ATL	BRI	NSH	TEX	PHO	MXC	TAL	RCH	DAR; 40																								121st	80	
2008	Elite 2 Racing	84	Chevy													CLT; 42	DOV	NSH	KEN	MLW	NHA	DAY	CHI	GTY	IRP	CGV	GLN	MCH	BRI	CAL	RCH	DOV	KAN	CLT	MEM	TEX	PHO	HOM	121st	80	
2010	Fleur-de-lis Motorsports	68	Chevy	DAY	CAL	LVS	BRI	NSH	PHO	TEX	TAL	RCH	DAR	DOV	CLT	NSH	KEN	ROA	NHA	DAY; DNQ	CHI	GTY	IRP	IOW	GLN	MCH; 31	BRI	CGV	ATL	RCH; 39	DOV	KAN	CAL	CLT; DNQ					99th	159	
2010	DF2 Motorsports	94	Dodge																																GTY; 40	TEX; DNQ	PHO; DNQ	HOM	99th	159	
2011	Rick Ware Racing	41	Ford	DAY	PHO; 36	LVS; 32	BRI; 28				NSH; 40	RCH; 35	DAR; 33	DOV; 34	IOW; 35		CHI; 31					NHA; 36	NSH; 33	IRP															31st	187	
2011	Fleur-de-lis Motorsports	68	Chevy					CAL; 41		TAL; 42										DAY; 42																			31st	187	
2011	Rick Ware Racing	75	Ford						TEX; 42							CLT; 39			ROA; 36									BRI; DNQ	ATL; 41	RCH; 37	CHI; 37	DOV; 34	KAN; 37	CLT; DNQ	TEX; 37	PHO; DNQ	HOM		31st	187	
2011	Rick Ware Racing	41	Chevy															MCH; 35			KEN; DNQ																		31st	187	
2011	Rick Ware Racing	71	Ford																						IOW; 40	GLN	CGV												31st	187	
2012	Rick Ware Racing	15	Chevy	DAY	PHO	LVS	BRI	CAL	TEX	RCH	TAL	DAR	IOW	CLT	DOV	MCH	ROA	KEN	DAY	NHA	CHI; 42	IND								KEN; 37									64th	48	
2012	Rick Ware Racing	71	Chevy																				IOW; 38	GLN	CGV	BRI; 37	ATL; 41	RCH; 38	CHI										64th	48	
2012	Rick Ware Racing	71	Ford																												DOV; 37	CLT							64th	48	
2012	Rick Ware Racing	75	Chevy																														KAN; 37	TEX					64th	48	
2012	Rick Ware Racing	75	Ford																																PHO; DNQ				64th	48	
2012	Rick Ware Racing	15	Ford																																PHO; 41	HOM			64th	48	
2013	Rick Ware Racing	23	Ford	DAY	PHO	LVS	BRI	CAL; 30	TEX	RCH	TAL	DAR	CLT	DOV																									42nd	123	
2013	Rick Ware Racing	15	Ford												IOW; 38	MCH; 35	ROA				CHI; 35		IOW; 36																42nd	123	
2013	Mike Harmon Racing	74	Chevy															KEN; 28	DAY	NHA		IND; DNQ		GLN; 31	MOH														42nd	123	
2013	Rick Ware Racing	15	Chevy																							BRI; DNQ	ATL		CHI; DNQ										42nd	123	
2013	Mike Harmon Racing	74	Dodge																									RCH; DNQ		KEN; 37	DOV; 31	KAN; 34	CLT	TEX; 34	PHO; 36	HOM; DNQ			42nd	123	
2014	MBM Motorsports	13	Toyota	DAY; DNQ											DOV; 34	MCH; 34				NHA; Wth																			38th	104	
2014	JGL Racing	93	Dodge		PHO; 37	LVS	BRI; 38					TAL; 37	IOW; 28	CLT																									38th	104	
2014	Jimmy Means Racing	79	Toyota					CAL; 38	TEX	DAR	RCH																												38th	104	
2014	Rick Ware Racing	15	Chevy														ROA; 35	KEN	DAY						MOH; 36														38th	104	
2014	MBM Motorsports	72	Chevy																		CHI; 35	IND; 37										KAN; 35	CLT	TEX					38th	104	
2014	Rick Ware Racing	23	Chevy																				IOW; 32	GLN															38th	104	
2014	MBM Motorsports	13	Dodge																							BRI; DNQ			CHI; DNQ	KEN; DNQ	DOV; 32								38th	104	
2014	The Motorsports Group	46	Chevy																								ATL; 39	RCH											38th	104	
2014	Rick Ware Racing	87	Ford																																PHO; 39	HOM			38th	104	
2015	MBM Motorsports	40	Toyota	DAY	ATL; 39								IOW; 40		DOV; 38																								41st	109	
2015	MBM Motorsports	40	Dodge			LVS; 36		CAL; 39	TEX	BRI	RCH; 37	TAL				MCH; 38	CHI	DAY	KEN	NHA	IND	IOW	GLN	MOH	BRI; 39	ROA	DAR; 39	RCH; 36	CHI						PHO; 39	HOM			41st	109	
2015	MBM Motorsports	13	Dodge				PHO; 32							CLT; 36																									41st	109	
2015	MBM Motorsports	13	Toyota																											KEN; 26									41st	109	
2015	MBM Motorsports	40	Chevy																												DOV; 39	CLT	KAN	TEX					41st	109	
2016	MBM Motorsports	40	Toyota	DAY	ATL; 36	LVS; 37	PHO						DOV; 34		POC; 38	MCH	IOW; 38			NHA; 38	IND	IOW	GLN	MOH	BRI	ROA													42nd	64	
2016	MBM Motorsports	13	Dodge					CAL; DNQ																															42nd	64	
2016	MBM Motorsports	40	Dodge						TEX; 39	BRI; DNQ	RCH; 38	TAL; 30						DAY; DNQ	KEN										CHI; 38	KEN	DOV	CLT	KAN	TEX	PHO	HOM			42nd	64	
2016	MBM Motorsports	13	Toyota											CLT; 30																									42nd	64	
2016	MBM Motorsports	13	Chevy																								DAR; 32	RCH											42nd	64	
2017	MBM Motorsports	13	Toyota	DAY	ATL; DNQ	LVS	PHO; 38	CAL	TEX; 39								IOW; 38	DAY	KEN																PHO; 36	HOM			59th	22	
2017	MBM Motorsports	13	Dodge							BRI; 27	RCH; 34	TAL			POC; 39	MCH											DAR; 38	RCH	CHI										59th	22	
2017	MBM Motorsports	40	Dodge										CLT; 39	DOV																									59th	22	
2017	MBM Motorsports	13	Chevy																	NHA; 36	IND	IOW	GLN	MOH	BRI	ROA													59th	22	
2017	MBM Motorsports	72	Toyota																											KEN; 39	DOV	CLT	KAN	TEX					59th	22	
2018	MBM Motorsports	66	Dodge	DAY	ATL	LVS	PHO	CAL	TEX	BRI	RCH	TAL	DOV; 39	CLT	POC	MCH	IOW	CHI	DAY	KEN						ROA; 32	DAR; 33	IND	LVS	RCH; 36	CLT								62nd	21	
2018	MBM Motorsports	66	Chevy																		NHA; 37	IOW	GLN	MOH	BRI; 33														62nd	21	
2018	MBM Motorsports	13	Toyota																													DOV; 36	KAN	TEX	PHO				62nd	21	
2018	MBM Motorsports	40	Dodge																																	HOM; 33			62nd	21	
2019	MBM Motorsports	13	Toyota	DAY	ATL	LVS	PHO	CAL	TEX	BRI	RCH	TAL	DOV	CLT	POC	MCH	IOW	CHI	DAY	KEN	NHA; 38	IOW	GLN	MOH	BRI	ROA	DAR	IND	LVS	RCH	CLT	DOV; 28	KAN	TEX	PHO	HOM			74th	10	
2020	MBM Motorsports	66	Toyota	DAY	LVS	CAL	PHO	DAR	CLT	BRI	ATL	HOM	HOM	TAL	POC	IND	KEN	KEN	TEX	KAN	ROA	DAY	DOV	DOV	DAY	DAR	RCH	RCH	BRI	LVS	TAL	CLT	KAN	TEX	MAR; 32	PHO			68th	5	
^{†} – Qualified for Jimmy Kitchens

==== Camping World Truck Series ====
NASCAR Camping World Truck Series results
Year	Team	No.	Make	1	2	3	4	5	6	7	8	9	10	11	12	13	14	15	16	17	18	19	20	21	22	23	24	25	26	27	NCWTC	Pts	Ref
1998	Mansion Motorsports	91	Ford	WDW	HOM; DNQ	PHO	POR	EVG	I70	GLN	TEX	BRI; 31	MLW	NZH	CAL	PPR	IRP	NHA	FLM	NSV	HPT	LVL	RCH; DNQ	MEM	GTY	MAR; DNQ	SON	MMR	PHO	LVS	63rd	217	
1999	Mansion Motorsports	91	Ford	HOM	PHO	EVG	MMR	MAR; DNQ	MEM	PPR	I70	BRI; 20	TEX	PIR	GLN	MLW	NSV	NZH	MCH	NHA	IRP	GTY	HPT	RCH	LVS	LVL; 30	TEX	CAL			61st	225	
2000	Mansion Motorsports	91	Ford	DAY; DNQ	HOM	PHO	MMR	MAR; DNQ	PIR	GTY	MEM	PPR	EVG																		70th	241	
2000	Team 23 Racing	23	Chevy											TEX; 17	KEN	GLN	MLW	NHA	NZH	MCH	IRP	NSV	CIC	RCH	DOV						70th	241	
2000		32	Ford																							TEX; DNQ	CAL				70th	241	
2002	Mansion Motorsports	85	Dodge	DAY	DAR	MAR	GTY	PPR	DOV; 26	TEX	MEM	MLW	KAN	KEN	NHA	MCH	IRP	NSH													91st	73	
2002	Ware Racing Enterprises	51	Dodge																RCH; 30	TEX	SBO	LVS	CAL	PHO	HOM						91st	73	
2003	Ware Racing Enterprises	51	Dodge	DAY	DAR	MMR	MAR	CLT	DOV	TEX	MEM	MLW	KAN	KEN	GTW	MCH	IRP	NSH	BRI	RCH	NHA; 36	CAL	LVS	SBO	TEX	MAR	PHO				130th	55	
2003	Ware Racing Enterprises	5	Dodge																									HOM; DNQ			130th	55	
2006	Rosenblum Racing	28	Chevy	DAY; DNQ	CAL	ATL; DNQ	MAR	GTY	CLT; 35	MFD	DOV	TEX	MCH	MLW	KAN	KEN	MEM	IRP	NSH	BRI	NHA	LVS	TAL	MAR	ATL	TEX	PHO	HOM			87th	58	
2010	Daisy Ramirez Motorsports	01	Chevy	DAY	ATL; DNQ	MAR	NSH	KAN; 27	DOV; 11	CLT	TEX	MCH	IOW; 20	GTY; 24	IRP							NHA; 23	LVS; 22	MAR	TAL	TEX	PHO	HOM			41st	687	
2010	Team Gill Racing	95	Dodge													POC; 36	NSH; 35	DAR													41st	687	
2010	Daisy Ramirez Motorsports	00	Chevy																BRI; 20	CHI											41st	687	
2010	Rick Ware Racing	6	Chevy																		KEN; 26										41st	687	
2011	Rick Ware Racing	1	Chevy	DAY	PHO	DAR	MAR	NSH	DOV; 33	CLT	KAN	TEX	KEN	IOW	NSH	IRP	POC	MCH	BRI	ATL	CHI	NHA	KEN	LVS	TAL	MAR	TEX	HOM			107th	0^{1}	
2013	SS-Green Light Racing	07	Chevy	DAY	MAR	CAR	KAN	CLT	DOV	TEX	KEN	IOW	ELD	POC	MCH	BRI	MSP; 29	IOW	CHI	LVS	TAL	MAR	TEX	PHO	HOM						109th	0^{1}	

^{*} Season still in progress
^{1} Ineligible for series points

=== ARCA Re/Max Series ===
(key) (Bold – Pole position awarded by qualifying time. Italics – Pole position earned by points standings or practice time. * – Most laps led.)

ARCA Re/Max Series results
Year	Team	No.	Make	1	2	3	4	5	6	7	8	9	10	11	12	13	14	15	16	17	18	19	20	21	22	23	ARMC	Pts	Ref
1998	Mansion Motorsports	14	Ford	DAY	ATL	SLM	CLT; 23	MEM	MCH	POC	SBS	TOL	PPR	POC	KIL	FRS	ISF	ATL	DSF	SLM	TEX	WIN	CLT; 14	TAL	ATL		NA	0	
1999	Mansion Motorsports	41	Chevy	DAY; 40																							58th	495	
1999	Mansion Motorsports	41	Ford		ATL; 39	SLM	AND	CLT; 37	MCH	POC												CLT; 14	TAL	ATL; DNQ			58th	495	
1999	Sadler Brothers Racing	95	Chevy								TOL; 13	SBS; DNQ	BLN	POC; DNQ	KIL	FRS	FLM	ISF	WIN	DSF	SLM						58th	495	
2000	Mansion Motorsports	41	Ford	DAY; DNQ	SLM	AND	CLT; 6	KIL	FRS	MCH	POC	TOL	KEN	BLN	POC	WIN	ISF	KEN	DSF	SLM	CLT	TAL	ATL				81st	240	
2007	James Hylton Motorsports	48	Dodge	DAY	USA	NSH	SLM	KAN	WIN	KEN	TOL	IOW	POC	MCH	BLN	KEN	POC	NSH	ISF	MIL	GTW; 10	DSF	CHI; 32	SLM; 31	TAL	TOL	79th	325	

^{*} Season still in progress
^{1} Ineligible for series points
