= Peak Fitness Racing =

NASCAR auto racing company

- Owner(s): Angela Sadler, Bryant Stith, Jeff Stec
- Base: North Carolina
- Series: Nextel Cup Series, Busch Series
- Race drivers: Derrike Cope, Hermie Sadler
- Manufacturer: Ford
- Opened: 2001
- Closed: 2006

Career
- Drivers' Championships: 0
- Race victories: 0

Peak Fitness Racing is a disbanded NASCAR team. It was owned by Hermie Sadler from 2001–2004 and Jeff Stec from 2005–2006, before it was sold.

The team was formed in 2001 by Hermie Sadler as SCORE Motorsports. Sadler fielded the No. 13 Chevrolet Monte Carlo sponsored by the Virginia Lottery for three races that year, his best finish was a 27th at Dover. The team switched to No. 02 for 2002, starting eight races and having a variety of different sponsorships. 2004 saw the car field a ride for a variety of drivers including Carl Long, Andy Belmont, and Jason Jarrett, as well as Sadler himself for 16 races. The team also fielded an entry for three races in 2002 in the Busch Series, with a best finish of 29th. They ran an additional three races in 2003, again getting a best finish of 29th. In 2004, Sadler ran 30 races in the Busch Series, but did not finish higher than 12th. Garrett Liberty drove one race at Memphis, finishing 31st.

In 2005, The team was bought by Stec who had sponsorship from PEAK Fitness, and the team switched to the number No. 66 Ford with engine support from Robert Yates Racing. After the spring race at Dover Downs, Sadler resigned from the team and was replaced by Mike Garvey, with sponsorship from Jani-King. After Garvey did not qualify at New Hampshire, Stec parted ways with Garvey. Jimmy Spencer drove the car at the fall Michigan race.

Stec then signed Kevin Lepage to join the No. 66 team. Lepage made all but one of his attempts with at 6th place start at Kansas, 13th at Atlanta and 17th at Charlotte. Lepage finish of 21st at Charlotte and finished all but one race. Hermie Sadler returned to the team for a one-race deal at Martinsville in the fall. He finished 32nd in the Jerry Kilgore Ford.

In 2006, the team switched to the No. 61 because Haas CNC Racing and their sponsor Best Buy asked to use number No. 66 for promotional reasons. The team missed just two races and were hoping to expand to a second car with Carl Long driving, but that plan fell through. The team was inside the top 35, but then barely fell out once the new top 35 were locked in, leading the team to rough times. In April, the team was sold to Front Row Motorsports.

== Car No. 02/13/61/66 results ==
NASCAR Nextel Cup Series results
Year	Team	No.	Make	1	2	3	4	5	6	7	8	9	10	11	12	13	14	15	16	17	18	19	20	21	22	23	24	25	26	27	28	29	30	31	32	33	34	35	36	NNCS	Pts	Ref
2001	Hermie Sadler	13	Chevy	DAY	CAR	LVS	ATL	DAR	BRI	TEX	MAR; DNQ	TAL	CAL	RCH; DNQ	CLT	DOV	MCH	POC	SON	DAY	CHI	NHA	POC	IND; DNQ	GLN	MCH	BRI; DNQ	DAR	RCH; DNQ	DOV; 27	KAN	CLT	MAR; 28	TAL	PHO	CAR	HOM; DNQ	ATL; 37	NHA; DNQ	50th	281	
2002	Hermie Sadler	02	Chevy	DAY; DNQ	CAR	LVS	ATL	DAR	BRI; 32	TEX	MAR; 29	TAL	CAL; DNQ	RCH; 18	CLT	DOV	POC	MCH	SON	DAY	CHI	NHA	POC	IND	GLN	MCH	BRI; DNQ	DAR	RCH; 23	NHA; 37	DOV	KAN	TAL	CLT; 41	MAR; 35	ATL	CAR; 41	PHO	HOM; DNQ	43rd	630	
2003	Hermie Sadler	02	Pontiac	DAY; DNQ	CAR	LVS	ATL	DAR	BRI; DNQ	TEX				RCH; DNQ		DOV; DNQ	POC							IND; DNQ	GLN	MCH	BRI; DNQ	DAR; 41		NHA; 40	DOV; 39	TAL	KAN							45th	619	
2003	Hermie Sadler	02	Chevy								TAL; 43	MAR; 43	CAL		CLT; DNQ			MCH; 36	SON	DAY	CHI	NHA	POC						RCH; 40					CLT; DNQ	MAR; 30	ATL; 41	PHO	CAR; DNQ	HOM; 38	45th	619	
2004	Carl Long	02	Pontiac	DAY	CAR	LVS; 38																																		40th	1301	
2004	Andy Belmont	02	Pontiac				ATL; 39	DAR; 37		TEX; DNQ																														40th	1301	
2004	Hermie Sadler	02	Pontiac						BRI; 31																															40th	1301	
2004	Hermie Sadler	02	Chevy								MAR; 26	TAL	CAL; 41	RCH; 42	CLT; 41	DOV; DNQ	POC				CHI; 40	NHA; 43		IND; DNQ	GLN; 33	MCH; 42	BRI; DNQ	CAL; DNQ	RCH; DNQ	NHA; 31	DOV; DNQ		KAN; 40	CLT; DNQ	MAR; 38	ATL; DNQ	PHO; 33	DAR; 40	HOM; 43	40th	1301	
2004	Hermie Sadler	02	Ford																													TAL; 23								40th	1301	
2004	Derrike Cope	02	Chevy															MCH; 42	SON	DAY																				40th	1301	
2004	Jason Jarrett	02	Chevy																				POC; 40																	40th	1301	
2005	Hermie Sadler	66	Ford	DAY; DNQ	CAL; DNQ	LVS; 33	ATL; DNQ	BRI; 32	MAR; 37	TEX; 29	PHO; DNQ	TAL; 40	DAR; 38	RCH; 41	CLT; DNQ	DOV; 30																			MAR; 32					40th	1635	
2005	Mike Garvey	66	Ford														POC; 25	MCH; 36		DAY; DNQ	CHI; DNQ	NHA; 36	POC; 34	IND; DNQ	GLN		BRI; DNQ	CAL; 37	RCH; 32	NHA; DNQ										40th	1635	
2005	Johnny Borneman III	66	Ford																SON; DNQ																					40th	1635	
2005	Jimmy Spencer	66	Ford																							MCH; 36														40th	1635	
2005	Kevin Lepage	66	Ford																												DOV; 40	TAL; 30	KAN; 36	CLT; 21		ATL; 42	TEX; 33	PHO; DNQ	HOM; 35	40th	1635	
2006	Kevin Lepage	61	Ford	DAY; 25	CAL; 35	LVS; 37	ATL; 35	BRI; 31	MAR; DNQ	TEX; 32		TAL; 28	RCH	DAR	CLT	DOV	POC	MCH	SON	DAY	CHI	NHA	POC	IND	GLN	MCH	BRI	CAL	RCH	NHA	DOV	KAN	TAL	CLT	MAR	ATL	TEX	PHO	HOM	42nd	1484	
2006	Kevin Lepage	61	Chevy								PHO; DNQ																													42nd	1484	
