= United Wrestling Federation =

Defunct American professional wrestling promotion

- Acronym: UWF
- Founded: January 2006
- Defunct: May 2008
- Owner(s): Hermie Sadler; Earl Hebner; Dave Hebner

The United Wrestling Federation (UWF) was an American independent professional wrestling promotion based in South Carolina and was owned by NASCAR driver and broadcaster Hermie Sadler and professional wrestling referees and twin brothers Earl and Dave Hebner.

The promotion was known for its affiliation with Total Nonstop Action Wrestling (TNA), a major professional wrestling promotion based in Nashville, Tennessee. An agreement between the two promotions allowed the UWF to use TNA intellectual property for its events from inception to December 2006.

Many UWF events were released on DVD by Highspots.

== History ==
=== Partnership with Total Nonstop Action Wrestling (2006–2007) ===
The first UWF event was on January 13, 2006 in Emporia, Virginia. Titled the Buckle Up Tour, the event featured America's Most Wanted (Chris Harris and James Storm) defending the NWA World Tag Team Championship against Team 3D (Brother Devon and Brother Ray) as the main event along with Jeff Jarrett defending the NWA World Heavyweight Championship against AJ Styles. Other wrestlers who were featured included Sabu, Ron Killings, D-Lo Brown, Sonjay Dutt, and Abyss.

On April 1, 2006, on the night before the 2006 DirecTV 500 at Martinsville Speedway in Martinsville, Virginia, the UWF held a show titled Winners' Circle in partnership with TNA at the Old Lowe's Building located near the race track. In this event, several NASCAR stars including Fox Sports and Speed Channel commentator Darrell Waltrip, drivers Michael Waltrip, Scott Riggs, and Kyle Petty, and NASCAR broadcaster Jeff Hammond were featured guests at the event. Petty and Riggs accompanied Team 3D (Brother Devon and Brother Ray), Sadler, and Hammond to the ring in an eight-man tag team lumberjack match against America's Most Wanted (Chris Harris and James Storm), Eric Young, and TNA minority owner Jeff Jarrett. This event's highlights were also featured on the April 13, 2006 episode of Impact during the Global Impact segment.

On May 26, 2006, the UWF and TNA held another event titled NASCAR Strikes Back at Lake Norman High School in Mooresville, North Carolina the weekend of the 2006 Coca-Cola 600 in nearby Concord, North Carolina. The main event match of the show which featured Jeff Hardy and Ron Killings taking on Eric Young and Jeff Jarrett also featured NASCAR broadcaster Jeff Hammond as a special guest referee.

On June 9, 2006, the UWF and TNA held their first show in Philadelphia, Pennsylvania at the New Alhambra Arena, formerly known as the ECW Arena. Titled Hardcore War, the event featured former ECW Heavyweight Champion, Rhino, Shark Boy, Jay Lethal, Jeff Jarrett, and Sonjay Dutt along with Samoa Joe defending the TNA X-Division Championship against AJ Styles and Christopher Daniels in a three way match. During the main event match, which featured America's Most Wanted (Chris Harris and James Storm), Team 3D (Brother Devon and Brother Ray), and The James Gang (BG James and Kip James) fighting each other non title three way tag team street fight, fans flooded the ring with chairs after Ray had called on the fans to give him a chair. The match ended in a no contest as a result.

The promotion continued to co-promote house shows with TNA until December 2006 when they held their final co-promoted show in South Hill, Virginia. Titled Season Finale, the main event saw Abyss defending the NWA World Heavyweight Championship against Brother Runt. Despite ending its co-promotion of UWF events, TNA championships continued to be defended on later shows until the UWF closed its doors.

=== Final years and closure (2007–2008) ===
On February 2, 2007, the UWF held its first independently promoted show in Wilson, North Carolina with the main event match being between Team 3D (Brother Devon and Brother Ray and The Diamonds in the Rough (David Young and Elix Skipper. On June 9, 2007, the UWF held a co-promoted show with Maryland Championship Wrestling (MCW) at the Fort Meade Pavilion in Fort Meade, Maryland. MCW's Heavyweight and Tag Team championships were defended at this event with Adam Flash defending the Heavyweight Championship against Maven and BLKOUT (Ruckus and Sabian) defending the Tag Team Championship against Arrogance (Chris Bosh and Scott Lost) and Team Macktion (Kirby Mack and TJ Mack) in a three way match. The TNA X-Division Championship was also defended on this show as Chris Sabin fought Sonjay Dutt for the title.

On September 21, 2007, WWE wrestlers Sgt. Slaughter and John Bradshaw Layfield, also known as JBL, made guest appearances during the UWF's Capital Punishment II show at the Siegel Center in Richmond, Virginia. The two wrestlers accompanied two teams representing them with Slaughter being represented by Dustin Rhodes, Kirby Mack, Rick Steiner, Scott Steiner, and TJ Mack and JBL being represented by CW Anderson, Elix Skipper, Hernandez, Homicide, and Steve Corino.

On May 2, 2008, the UWF held their final show at Harrisonburg High School in Harrisonburg, Virginia with the show's main event being Samoa Joe defending the TNA World Heavyweight Championship in a four way match against James Storm, Jerry Lynn, and Joey Matthews. After this event, the promotion ceased operations.
