= Hermie Sadler =

American racing driver (born 1969)

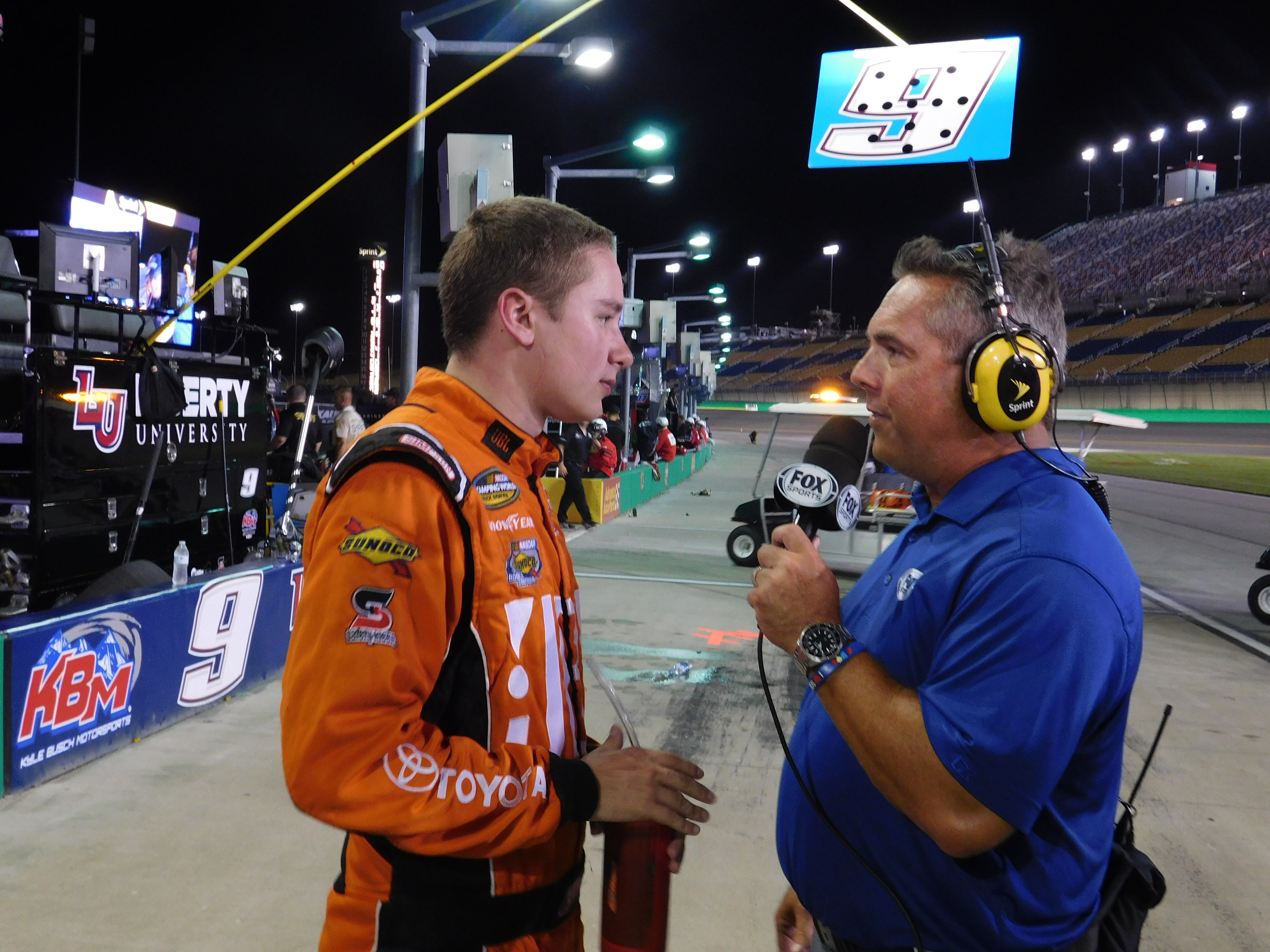
- Sadler (right) interviewing Christopher Bell at Kentucky Speedway in 2016
- Born: Herman Marion Sadler III; April 24, 1969 (age 57); Emporia, Virginia, U.S.
- Awards: 1993 NASCAR Busch Series Rookie of the Year

NASCAR Cup Series career
- 66 races run over 12 years
- 2018 position: 50th
- Best finish: 44th (2004, 2005)
- First race: 1996 Miller 500 (Dover)
- Last race: 2018 First Data 500 (Martinsville)
Wins	Top tens	Poles
0	0	0

NASCAR O'Reilly Auto Parts Series career
- 266 races run over 16 years
- 2019 position: 71st
- Best finish: 5th (1994)
- First race: 1992 Texas Pete 300 (Orange County)
- Last race: 2019 Go Bowling 250 (Richmond)
- First win: 1993 Polaroid 300 (Orange County)
- Last win: 1994 Pantry Stores 300 (Orange County)
Wins	Top tens	Poles
2	44	3

NASCAR FedEx Freight Truck Series career
- 15 races run over 6 years
- Best finish: 45th (2010)
- First race: 1995 Fas Mart Supertruck Shootout (Richmond)
- Last race: 2010 Ford 200 (Homestead)
Wins	Top tens	Poles
0	1	0
- Statistics up to date as of June 21, 2023.

Herman Marion Sadler III (born April 24, 1969) is an American professional stock car racing driver and broadcaster, businessman and politician.

He competed in NASCAR as a driver from 1992 to 2019. In the late 2000s and the 2010s, he scaled back his driving and worked for Speed/Fox as a broadcaster, including as a reporter on NASCAR RaceDay and as a pit reporter on their Truck Series broadcasts.

After leaving NASCAR altogether after 2019, he ran for political office as a Republican in his home state of Virginia for the newly redrawn 17th district in the State Senate in the 2023 election. He lost the Republican primary election on June 20 to Emily Brewer, a member of the Virginia House of Delegates.

He is the brother of Elliott Sadler, who is also a former NASCAR driver.

== Racing career ==
Sadler began racing in go-karts alongside younger brother Elliott in their hometown of Emporia. He then began running late models in Virginia. In 1992, Sadler made his debut in the NASCAR Busch Series at Orange County Speedway. He started nineteenth but finished 25th after wrecking his No. 32 Oldsmobile. He ran four more races that season, with a best finish of twentieth, at Dover International Speedway and Hickory Motor Speedway.

=== 1993–1998 ===
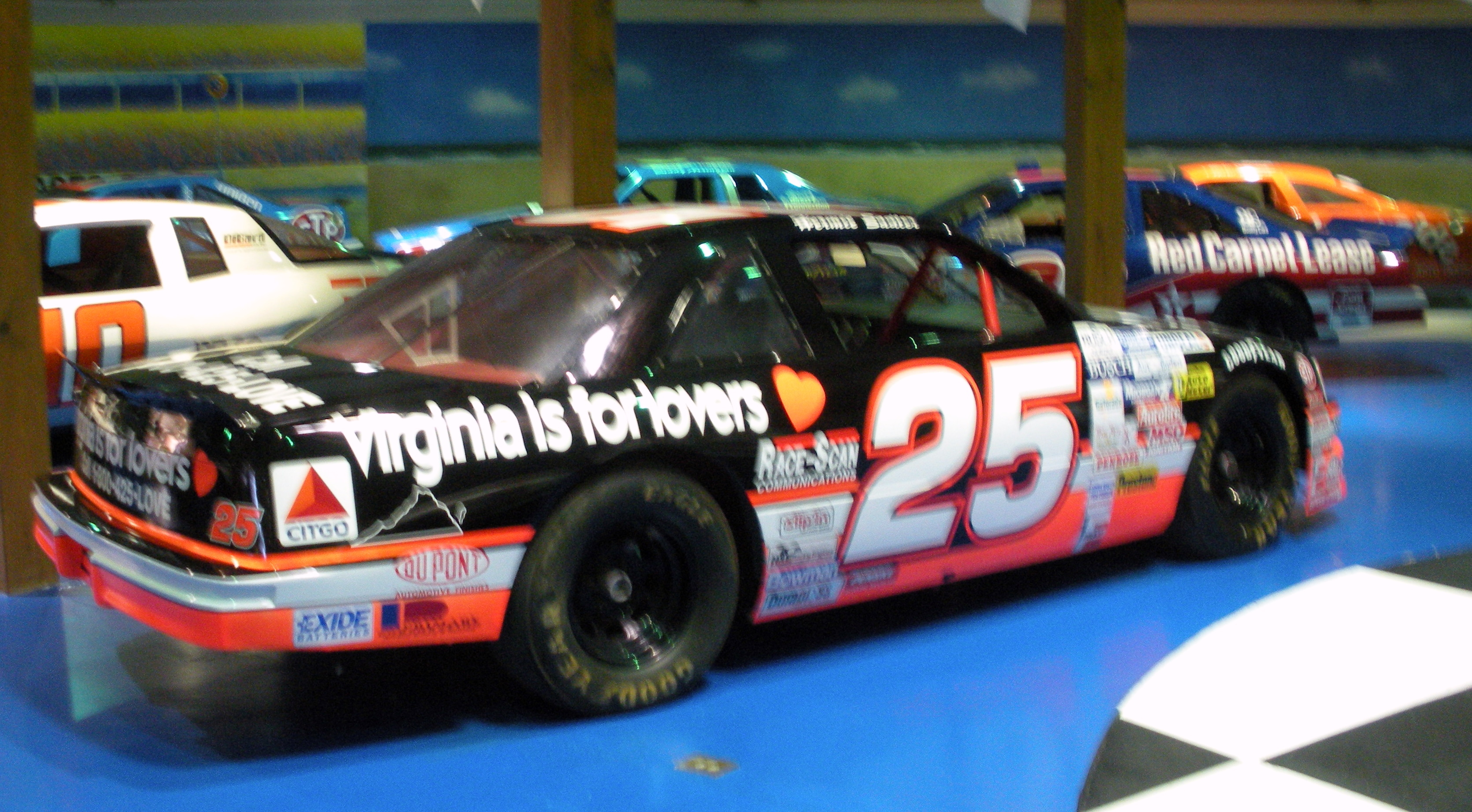
Sadler's 1993 and 1994 Busch Series car

Sadler began running the Busch Series full-time in 1993. Driving the No. 25 Shell Oil-Virginia is for Lovers-sponsored Oldsmobile for Don Beverly, Sadler picked a win at Orange County, finished tenth in points, and was named NASCAR Busch Grand National Series Rookie of the Year. He followed that up with another win at Orange County and a fifth-place points finish the next season in 1994. After that year ended, Sadler teamed with his father, Herman, to run the No. 1 DeWalt Tools-sponsored Chevrolet. Although he did not win, Sadler had six top-ten finishes and a thirteenth place finish in the point standings. He won the pole at the 1996 Milwaukee Mile race, but he continued to drop and finished fifteenth place in points. He also made his debut in the Winston Cup Series, starting 30th and finishing 37th at the Miller 400 in the No. 26 Chevrolet owned by William Slate.

In 1997, his ride was purchased by Diamond Ridge Motorsports, which also owned Elliott's current ride. Sadler grabbed two more poles and had seven Top 10 finishes, finishing tenth in points. After a nearly identical season in 1998, Sadler was pushed out of the ride, while Elliott signed with Wood Brothers Racing in the Cup Series.

=== 1999–2004 ===
In 1999, Sadler signed to drive the No. 72 MGM Brakes-sponsored Chevy for Ron Parker. But a season-opening failure to qualify, at the NAPA Auto Parts 300, brought an end to the streak of 173 consecutive races for Sadler. After his release from the team following the MBNA Platinum 200, Sadler spent the rest of the season with BACE Motorsports' Bayer-Alka-Seltzer-sponsored entry, and then Innovative Motorsports. In 2000, Sadler signed to drive the No. 30 Little Trees-sponsored Chevy for Innovative, but often did not qualify for races, and was released after six events. After a brief stint of Innovative using interim drivers, Sadler returned to the team for the balance of the season, posting a seventh-place finish at Pikes Peak International Raceway.

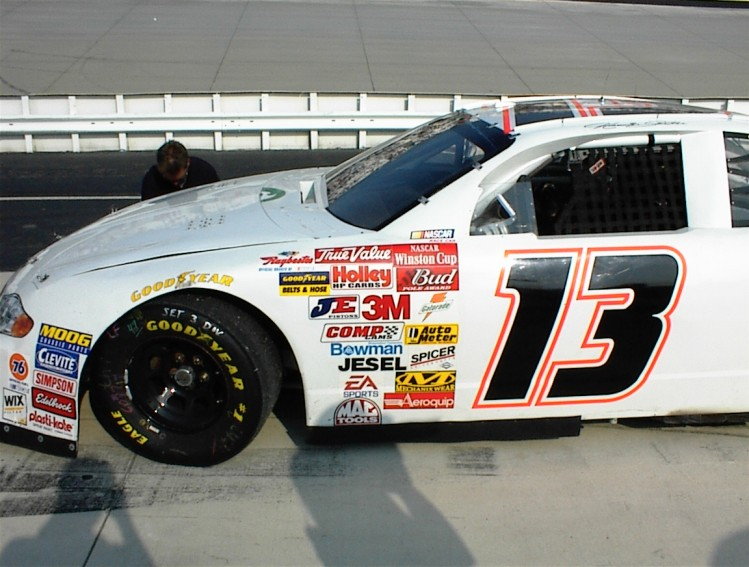
Sadler's car at the 2001 MBNA Cal Ripken, Jr. 400 at Dover

In 2001, Sadler and his wife Angela formed their own team, Score Motorsports, and began running a limited schedule in the Winston Cup Series. Running cars purchased from Larry Hedrick Motorsports and with Virginia Lottery sponsoring, he ran three races, his best finish being a 27th at Dover. Sadler returned to the Busch Series in 2002, running a limited schedule in his own No. 02 as well as the No. 43 for the Curb Agajanian Performance Group. His best finish was a 21st at Richmond. Sadler also ran ten Cup races that year, eight in his own No. 02 entry, and two races for Junie Donlavey.

For 2003, Sadler announced he would run the No. 54 Toys R Us-sponsored Chevy in the Busch Series for Team Bristol Motorsports. Ten races into the season, the team shut down following the Hardee's 250 due to financial difficulties. Sadler ended that Busch Season running three races on his own with Zapf Creations sponsoring. He also ran ten more Cup races in the No. 02 that season, with sponsors such as Dollar Tree, Go Team VA, and Total Nonstop Action Wrestling. Former NBA player Bryant Stith became a co-owner of Score in 2004, and with help from fan donations, Sadler was able to run thirty Busch races, the best finish being a twelfth at Milwaukee. He also ran sixteen races in the Cup Series, and had a 23rd-place finish at Talladega Superspeedway, as well as fielding cars for Carl Long and Andy Belmont. As a team owner, Sadler was the last to compete in a Pontiac, which had pulled out of NASCAR after the 2003 season.

=== 2005–2011 ===
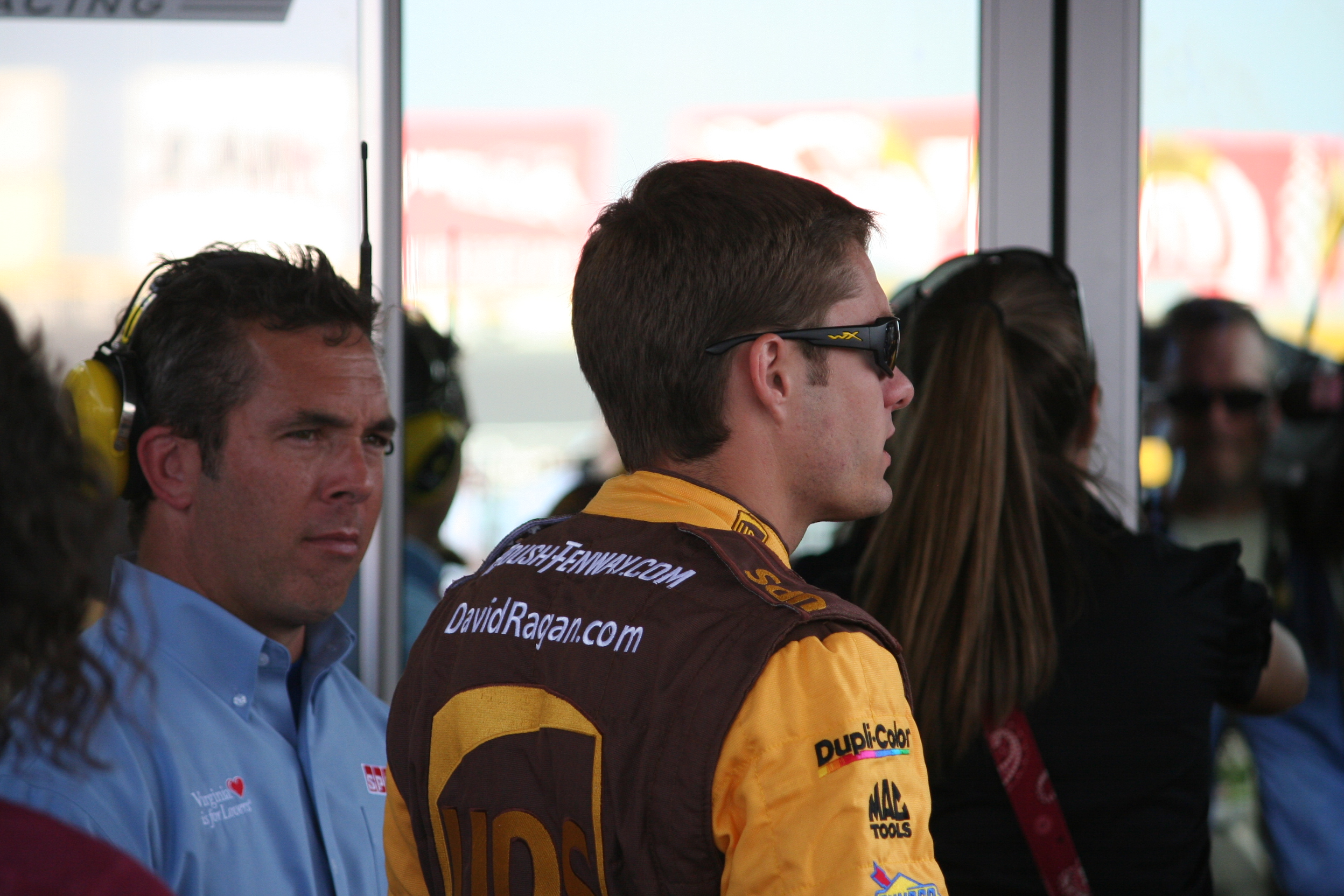
Sadler and David Ragan during the 2011 Coca-Cola 600 race weekend

During the lead-up to 2005, Sadler sold his Busch Series team and announced he was selling a large portion of his Cup team to Jeff Stec, owner of Peak Fitness, who would sponsor the new No. 66 car. Sadler continued to struggle despite the new ownership, and resigned from the ride midseason. He spent the balance of the year driving occasional races for Front Row Motorsports, and even returned to the No. 66 for one race in a sponsorship deal with Jerry Kilgore.

In 2006, Sadler ran seven races for MBA Racing, racing the No. 00 Aaron's Rent-sponsored Ford as a partnership with the Michael Waltrip Racing team. Sadler made one start at Martinsville Speedway in 2007 and 2008, driving Chevrolet Silverados for Andy Hillenburg. He ran three truck races for Hillenburg in 2010.

Sadler returned to the Busch Series (now Xfinity Series) for the first time in over five years in 2010, and raced at Richmond in the No. 09 car, sponsored by TNA Impact!, finishing six laps down, in 32nd position. He made two additional starts in Busch that season in the No. 27 Baker Curb Racing Ford, but failed to finish higher than thirtieth. He made six truck races for Hillenburg, and raced in the 2010 TUMS Fast Relief 500 at Martinsville Speedway, driving for TRG Motorsports. It was his first start in four years in NASCAR Sprint Cup competition and the team cited his prior success at Martinsville as the best chance for TRG to remain in the Top 35; TRG entered Martinsville just fifteen points ahead of 35th and twenty points in front of the 36th place team. Sadler finished 26th and the TRG maintained its top-35 status, and he ran three additional Cup races for TRG in 2011.

=== 2012–present ===
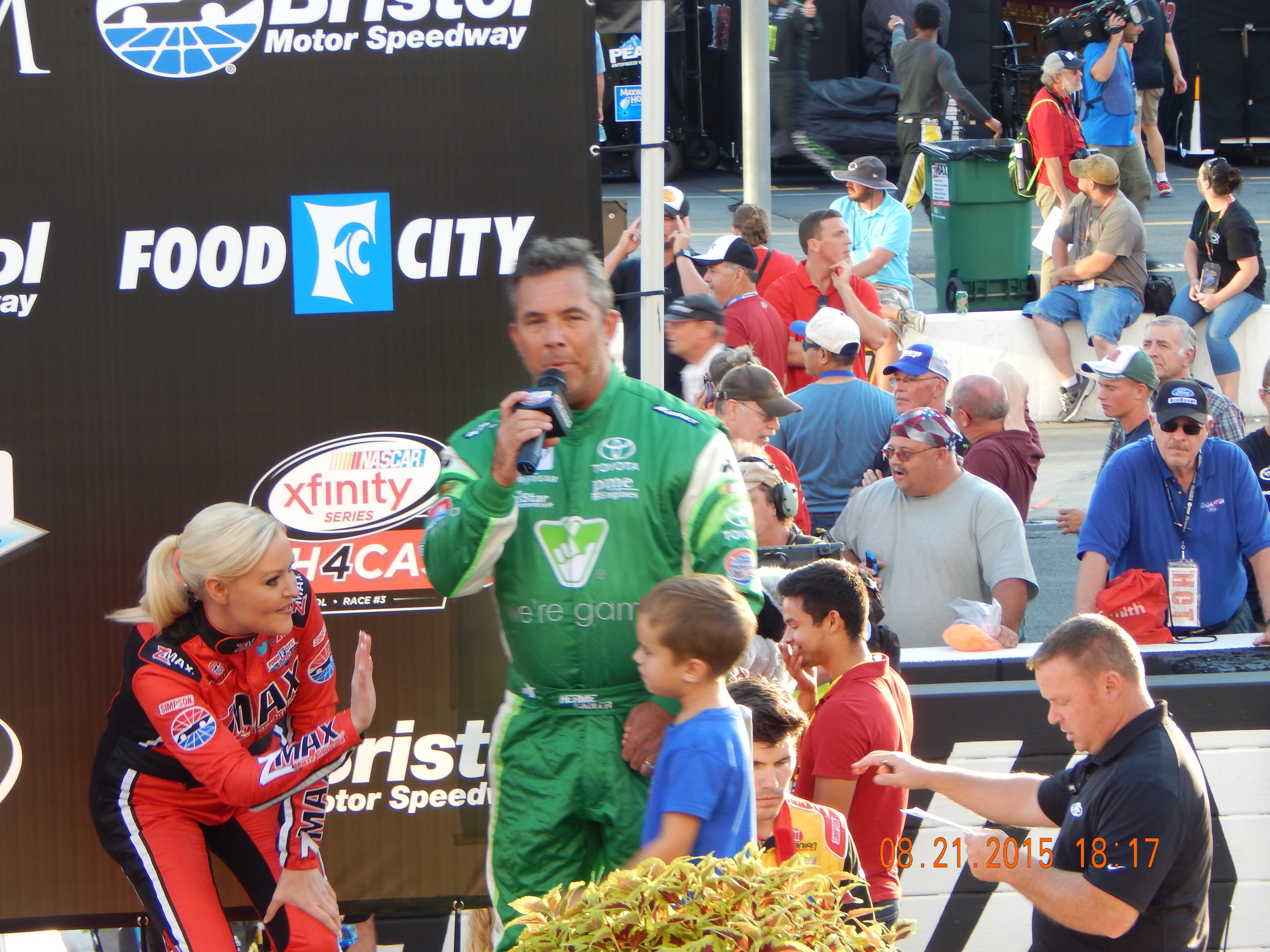
Sadler during driver introductions for the Xfinity Series race at Bristol in August 2015

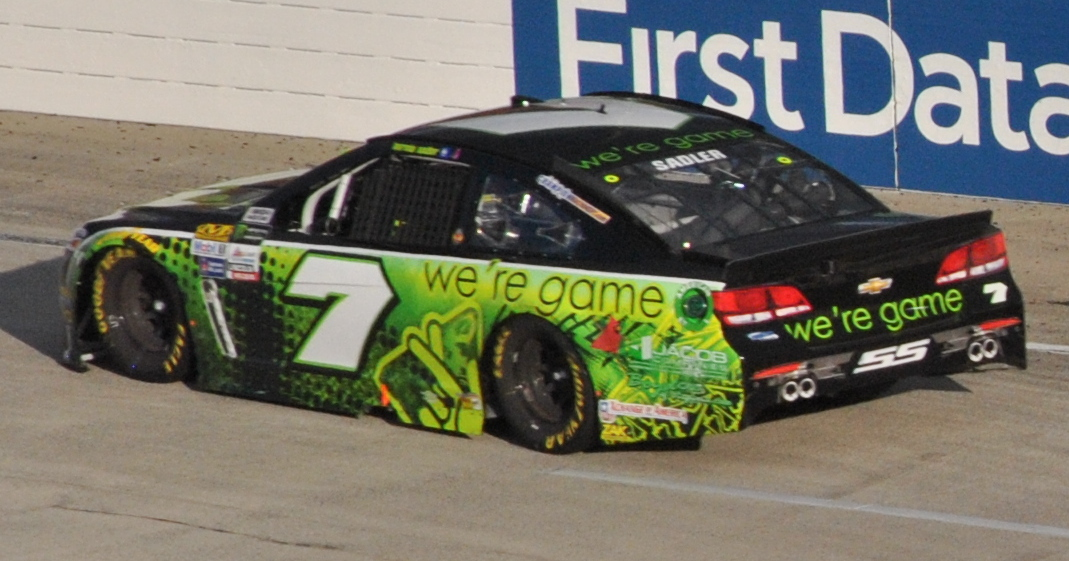
Sadler during the Cup Series race at Martinsville in October 2017

In 2012, Richard Childress Racing gave him a start in the No. 33 Sprint Cup car at Martinsville in the Goody's Fast Relief 500. Anderson's Maple Syrup sponsored the entry, and Sadler finished 31st at his home track.

After not running any races in 2013, Sadler returned as a driver in 2014, running the late season Nationwide Series short track races at Bristol and Richmond for TriStar Motorsports. He piloted the No. 19 Toyota Camry usually driven by Mike Bliss, with Bliss moving to the team's No. 10 entry for these events. The Virginia Lottery sponsored the ride for Sadler. Starting that year and through the end of his career, he would serve as a spokesperson for the lottery who would sponsor him in races in or near Virginia. His only starts in 2015 came for JGL Racing at Bristol and Richmond, with Virginia Lottery continuing to sponsor.

After a five-year absence from the Cup Series, Sadler drove the No. 7 Chevy for Premium Motorsports at the 2017 First Data 500 at Martinsville Speedway; after starting the race last, he finished 34th.

On November 17, 2019, Sadler tweeted he had departed NASCAR on Fox.

Sadler currently owns Sadler Stanley Racing with politician Bill Stanley, fielding modifieds on the SMART Modified Tour and NASCAR Whelen Modified Tour. SS Racing has teamed up with PSR Products and sponsor Pace-O-Matic, with drivers Bobby Labonte, Ryan Newman, Luke Baldwin, Jonathan Cash, and Jon Brown.

== Political career ==
On November 9, 2022, Sadler announced that he would run against Delegate Emily Brewer in the Republican primary for the newly redrawn Virginia State Senate District 17 in 2023. The district includes Suffolk, Isle of Wight County, Portsmouth, Southampton County, Brunswick County, Greensville County, Franklin City, parts of Dinwiddie County, and his lifelong hometown of Emporia, Virginia.

Sadler would lose the primary election on June 20, 2023 to Brewer. In the campaign, Sadler had outraised Brewer by about $200,000, raising $680,000 for his campaign as of June 8. Brewer was endorsed by Virginia Governor Glenn Youngkin, Lieutenant Governor Winsome Sears and Attorney General Jason Miyares.

== Professional wrestling ==
=== Total Nonstop Action Wrestling (2002, 2007, 2009) ===
In 2002 Sadler had a feud in Total Nonstop Action Wrestling with Ron Killings, and a number of appearances and matches as part of a cross promotion between TNA and NASCAR. TNA later sponsored Sadler's racing efforts.

As of March 27, 2009, he has been hosting an online web cast show entitled Hermie's Hotseat that can be seen on TNA's YouTube channel where Sadler does candid sit-down interviews with the performers and employees of Total Nonstop Action Wrestling.

=== United Wrestling Federation (2005–2007) ===
Hermie started the United Wrestling Federation, wrestling promotion in 2005. At first, the company worked with TNA Wrestling bringing house shows under the TNA/UWF moniker to areas like Detroit, Philadelphia, and other parts of the east coast. Hermie wrestled part-time in his promotion as well, teaming with Rhino, Jeff Hardy, Team 3D, and others.

In late 2006, the UWF ceased co-promoting with TNA and began independent operations in 2007, although they continue to use the six-sided ring that TNA utilized at the time. At a show in Richmond, Virginia on September 29, 2006, Hermie presented a $10,000 check to an autism foundation. On December 5, 2007, he signed with TNA as an announcer.

=== Global Force Wrestling (2014–2017) ===
It was announced on April 21, 2014, that Sadler joined the board of directors for Jeff Jarrett's Global Force Wrestling.

== Personal life ==
Sadler graduated from the University of North Carolina and is an avid North Carolina Tar Heels sports fan. Married February 3, 1996, he and his wife Angie have three daughters -– Cora, Halie and Naomi. Sadler has publicly talked about his middle daughter, Halie, being on the autism spectrum.

Sadler and his wife Angie own restaurants in their hometown of Emporia, Virginia, including FO SHO Bar and Grille, the Victory Lane Restaurant, and a Quiznos location. He and his sister own the Sadler Brothers Oil Company, which has managed truck stops and convenience stores throughout three generations of ownership.

== Motorsports career results ==
=== NASCAR ===
(key) (Bold – Pole position awarded by qualifying time. Italics – Pole position earned by points standings or practice time. * – Most laps led.)

==== NASCAR Cup Series ====
NASCAR Cup Series results
Year	Team	No.	Make	1	2	3	4	5	6	7	8	9	10	11	12	13	14	15	16	17	18	19	20	21	22	23	24	25	26	27	28	29	30	31	32	33	34	35	36	MENCC	Pts	Ref
1996	Sadler Racing	26	Chevy	DAY	CAR	RCH	ATL	DAR	BRI	NWS	MAR	TAL	SON	CLT; DNQ	DOV; 37	POC	MCH	DAY	NHA	POC	TAL	IND	GLN	MCH	BRI	DAR	RCH	DOV	MAR	NWS	CLT	CAR	PHO	ATL						64th	52	
2000	Joe Bessey Racing	60	Chevy	DAY	CAR	LVS	ATL	DAR	BRI	TEX	MAR	TAL	CAL	RCH	CLT	DOV	MCH	POC	SON	DAY	NHA	POC	IND	GLN	MCH	BRI	DAR	RCH	NHA	DOV	MAR	CLT	TAL	CAR	PHO	HOM; DNQ	ATL; DNQ			NA	-	
2001	SCORE Motorsports	13	Chevy	DAY	CAR	LVS	ATL	DAR	BRI	TEX	MAR; DNQ	TAL	CAL	RCH; DNQ	CLT	DOV	MCH	POC	SON	DAY	CHI	NHA	POC	IND; DNQ	GLN	MCH	BRI; DNQ	DAR	RCH; DNQ	DOV; 27	KAN	CLT	MAR; 28	TAL	PHO	CAR	HOM; DNQ	ATL; 37	NHA; DNQ	58th	131	
2002	SCORE Motorsports	02	Chevy	DAY; DNQ	CAR	LVS	ATL	DAR	BRI; 32	TEX	MAR; 29	TAL	CAL; DNQ	RCH; 18													BRI; DNQ	DAR	RCH; 23	NHA; 37	DOV	KAN	TAL	CLT; 41	MAR; 35	ATL	CAR; 41	PHO	HOM; DNQ	45th	688	
2002	Donlavey Racing	90	Ford												CLT; 29	DOV; DNQ	POC; 29	MCH	SON	DAY	CHI	NHA	POC	IND	GLN	MCH														45th	688	
2003	SCORE Motorsports	02	Pontiac	DAY; DNQ	CAR	LVS	ATL	DAR	BRI; DNQ	TEX				RCH; DNQ		DOV; DNQ	POC							IND; DNQ	GLN	MCH	BRI; DNQ	DAR; 41		NHA; 40	DOV; 39	TAL	KAN							50th	373	
2003	SCORE Motorsports	02	Chevy								TAL; 43	MAR; 43	CAL		CLT; DNQ			MCH; 36	SON	DAY	CHI	NHA	POC						RCH; 40					CLT; DNQ	MAR; 30	ATL; 41	PHO	CAR; DNQ	HOM; 38	50th	373	
2004	SCORE Motorsports	02	Pontiac	DAY	CAR	LVS	ATL	DAR	BRI; 31	TEX																														44th	852	
2004	SCORE Motorsports	02	Chevy								MAR; 26	TAL	CAL; 41	RCH; 42	CLT; 41	DOV; DNQ	POC	MCH	SON	DAY	CHI; 40	NHA; 43	POC	IND; DNQ	GLN; 33	MCH; 42	BRI; DNQ	CAL; DNQ	RCH; DNQ	NHA; 31	DOV; DNQ		KAN; 40	CLT; DNQ	MAR; 38	ATL; DNQ	PHO; 33	DAR; 40	HOM; 43	44th	852	
2004	SCORE Motorsports	02	Ford																													TAL; 23								44th	852	
2005	Peak Fitness Racing	66	Ford	DAY; DNQ	CAL; DNQ	LVS; 33	ATL; DNQ	BRI; 32	MAR; 37	TEX; 29	PHO; DNQ	TAL; 40	DAR; 38	RCH; 41	CLT; DNQ	DOV; 30																			MAR; 32	ATL	TEX	PHO	HOM	44th	717	
2005	Front Row Motorsports	92	Chevy														POC; DNQ	MCH	SON	DAY; 30	CHI	NHA; DNQ	POC; DNQ	IND	GLN	MCH	BRI; 30		RCH; DNQ	NHA	DOV; DNQ									44th	717	
2005	Front Row Motorsports	92	Dodge																									CAL; 42												44th	717	
2005	Mach 1 Motorsports	34	Ford																													TAL; QL^{†}	KAN	CLT						44th	717	
2006	MBA Racing	00	Ford	DAY; 40	CAL; DNQ	LVS; DNQ	ATL; 42					TAL; 43			CLT; DNQ					DAY; 41	CHI	NHA	POC	IND	GLN								TAL; DNQ							54th	251	
2006	MBA Racing	00	Chevy					BRI; 43	MAR; DNQ	TEX	PHO		RCH; DNQ	DAR		DOV; 43	POC	MCH	SON							MCH; 35	BRI; DNQ	CAL	RCH; DNQ	NHA	DOV	KAN		CLT; DNQ	MAR; DNQ	ATL	TEX	PHO	HOM	54th	251	
2010	TRG Motorsports	71	Chevy	DAY	CAL	LVS	ATL	BRI	MAR	PHO	TEX	TAL	RCH	DAR	DOV	CLT	POC	MCH	SON	NHA	DAY	CHI	IND	POC	GLN	MCH	BRI	ATL	RCH	NHA	DOV	KAN	CAL	CLT	MAR; 26	TAL	TEX	PHO	HOM	67th	85	
2011	TRG Motorsports	71	Chevy	DAY	PHO	LVS	BRI	CAL	MAR; 28	TEX	TAL	RCH	DAR	DOV	CLT	KAN	POC	MCH	SON	DAY	KEN	NHA	IND	POC	GLN	MCH	BRI	ATL	RCH	CHI	NHA	DOV	KAN							64th	0^{1}	
2011	TRG Motorsports	71	Ford																															CLT; 33	TAL	MAR; 26	TEX	PHO	HOM	64th	0^{1}	
2012	Richard Childress Racing	33	Chevy	DAY	PHO	LVS	BRI	CAL	MAR; 31	TEX	KAN	RCH	TAL	DAR	CLT	DOV	POC	MCH	SON	KEN	DAY	NHA	IND	POC	GLN	MCH	BRI	ATL	RCH	CHI	NHA	DOV	TAL	CLT	KAN	MAR	TEX	PHO	HOM	50th	13	
2017	Premium Motorsports	7	Chevy	DAY	ATL	LVS	PHO	CAL	MAR	TEX	BRI	RCH	TAL	KAN	CLT	DOV	POC	MCH	SON	DAY	KEN	NHA	IND	POC	GLN	MCH	BRI	DAR	RCH	CHI	NHA	DOV	CLT	TAL	KAN	MAR; 34	TEX	PHO	HOM	48th	3	
2018	Premium Motorsports	7	Chevy	DAY	ATL	LVS	PHO	CAL	MAR	TEX	BRI	RCH	TAL	DOV	KAN	CLT	POC	MCH	SON	CHI	DAY	KEN	NHA	POC	GLN	MCH	BRI	DAR	IND	LVS	RCH	CLT	DOV	TAL	KAN	MAR; 40	TEX	PHO	HOM	50th	1	
^{†} - Qualified but replaced by Mike Skinner

===== Daytona 500 =====
Year	Team	Manufacturer	Start	Finish
2002	SCORE Motorsports	Chevy	DNQ	
2003	SCORE Motorsports	Pontiac	DNQ	
2005	Peak Fitness Racing	Ford	DNQ	
2006	MBA Racing	Ford	41	40

==== Xfinity Series ====
NASCAR Xfinity Series results
Year	Team	No.	Make	1	2	3	4	5	6	7	8	9	10	11	12	13	14	15	16	17	18	19	20	21	22	23	24	25	26	27	28	29	30	31	32	33	34	35	NXSC	Pts	Ref
1992	Ellis Racing	32	Olds	DAY	CAR	RCH	ATL	MAR	DAR	BRI	HCY	LAN	DUB	NZH	CLT	DOV	ROU	MYB	GLN	VOL	NHA	TAL	IRP	ROU; 25	MCH	NHA	BRI	DAR	RCH; 26	DOV; 20	CLT	MAR	CAR; 37						53rd	431	
1992	Sadler Racing	10	Chevy																															HCY; 20					53rd	431	
1993	Beverly Racing	25	Olds	DAY; 17	CAR; 13	RCH; 11	DAR; 16	BRI; 6	HCY; 9	ROU; 13	MAR; 4	NZH; 30	CLT; 29	DOV; 30	MYB; 11	GLN; 14	MLW; 3	TAL; 9	IRP; 13	MCH; 28	NHA; 7	BRI; 26	DAR; 21	RCH; 3	DOV; 13	ROU; 1	CLT; 31	MAR; 15	CAR; 19	HCY; 14	ATL; 16								10th	3362	
1994	Beverly Racing	25	Chevy	DAY; 12	CAR; 3	RCH; 5	ATL; DNQ	MAR; 28	DAR; 10	HCY; 9	BRI; 18	ROU; 1	NHA; 13*	NZH; 25	CLT; 15	DOV; 20	MYB; 17	GLN; 5	MLW; 11	SBO; 2	TAL; 9	HCY; 6	IRP; 12	MCH; 8	BRI; 14	DAR; 25	RCH; 29	DOV; 5	CLT; 18	MAR; 15	CAR; 25								5th	3466	
1994	Fred Turner Racing	4	Chevy				ATL; 32																																5th	3466	
1995	Sadler Racing	1	Chevy	DAY; 13	CAR; 40	RCH; 38	ATL; 5	NSV; 14	DAR; 29	BRI; 15	HCY; 2	NHA; 23	NZH; 25	CLT; 39	DOV; 8	MYB; 20	GLN; 9	MLW; 27	TAL; 21	SBO; 15	IRP; 6	MCH; 40	BRI; 19	DAR; 31	RCH; 19	DOV; 2	CLT; 36	CAR; 16	HOM; 17										13th	2694	
1996	Sadler Racing	1	Chevy	DAY; 32	CAR; 18	RCH; 41	ATL; 21	NSV; 14	DAR; 40	BRI; 13	HCY; 2	NZH; 30	CLT; 24	DOV; 10	SBO; 7	MYB; 25	GLN; 31	**MLW**; 27	NHA; 6	TAL; 31	IRP; 18	MCH; 15	BRI; 27	DAR; 11	RCH; 12	DOV; 10	CLT; 31	CAR; 40	HOM; 22										15th	2588	
1997	Diamond Ridge Motorsports	1	Chevy	DAY; 17	CAR; 18	RCH; 16	ATL; 25	LVS; 21	DAR; 11	HCY; 11	TEX; 19	**BRI**; 21	NSV; 7	TAL; 19	NHA; 33	NZH; 12	CLT; 9	DOV; 14	SBO; 27	GLN; 9	MLW; 3	MYB; 19	GTY; 11	IRP; 29	**MCH**; 20	BRI; 28	DAR; 7	RCH; 10	DOV; 26	CLT; 28	CAL; 27	CAR; 5	HOM; 25						10th	3340	
1998	Diamond Ridge Motorsports	29	Chevy	DAY; 12	CAR; 12	LVS; 9	NSV; 24	DAR; 7	BRI; 20	TEX; 35	HCY; 2	TAL; 13	NHA; 33	NZH; 18	CLT; 10	DOV; 25	RCH; 14	PPR; 16	GLN; 34	MLW; 13	MYB; 12	CAL; 20	SBO; 18	IRP; 21	MCH; 31	BRI; 13	DAR; 14	RCH; 24	DOV; 31	CLT; 25	GTY; 34	CAR; 3	ATL; 26	HOM; 19					10th	3340	
1999	Parker Racing	72	Chevy	DAY; DNQ	CAR; 25	LVS; DNQ	ATL; DNQ	DAR; 38	TEX; 32	NSV; 22	BRI; DNQ	TAL; DNQ	CAL	NHA; 7	RCH; 22	NZH; 42	CLT; 25	DOV; DNQ	SBO	GLN	MLW																		37th	1449	
1999	BACE Motorsports	33	Chevy																			MYB; 31	PPR; 11	GTY; 14	IRP	MCH; 32	BRI; DNQ	DAR; DNQ	RCH; 24										37th	1449	
1999	Innovative Motorsports	47	Chevy																											DOV; 42	CLT; DNQ	CAR; DNQ	MEM; 23	PHO; 22	HOM; 30				37th	1449	
2000	Innovative Motorsports	30	Chevy	DAY; 14	CAR; 20	LVS; DNQ	ATL; DNQ	DAR; 41	BRI; DNQ	TEX	NSV	TAL	CAL	RCH	NHA	CLT	DOV	SBO	MYB	GLN	MLW; 17	NZH; 11	PPR; 7	GTY; 27	IRP; 17	MCH; 36		DAR; 31		DOV; 27	CLT	CAR; 24	MEM; 23	PHO; 30	HOM; 42				35th	1449	
2000	Wellrich Motorsports	7	Chevy																								BRI; 24												35th	1449	
2000	Wellrich Motorsports	07	Chevy																										RCH; DNQ										35th	1449	
2002	SCORE Motorsports	02	Chevy	DAY	CAR	LVS	DAR	BRI	TEX	NSH	TAL	CAL	RCH	NHA	NZH	CLT	DOV	NSH	KEN; 30	MLW	DAY	CHI	GTY	PPR	IRP; 40	MCH	BRI	DAR	RCH; 21	DOV	KAN								66th	368	
2002	Curb Racing	43	Chevy																													CLT; 29	MEM	ATL; DNQ	CAR; 33	PHO	HOM; 29		66th	368	
2003	Team Bristol Motorsports	54	Chevy	DAY; 32	CAR; 20	LVS; 21	DAR; 29	BRI; 29	TEX; 21	TAL; 22	NSH; 19	CAL; 37	RCH; 11	GTY	NZH	CLT	DOV	NSH	KEN	MLW	DAY	CHI	NHA	PPR	IRP	MCH	BRI	DAR											44th	1066	
2003	SCORE Motorsports	02	Chevy																										RCH; DNQ	DOV	KAN	CLT; 42	MEM	ATL	PHO	CAR; 39			44th	1066	
2003	SCORE Motorsports	02	Ford																																		HOM; 29		44th	1066	
2004	SCORE Motorsports	02	Pontiac	DAY; 23							TAL; 30										DAY; 21																		24th	2414	
2004	SCORE Motorsports	02	Chevy		CAR; 34	LVS; 37	DAR; 18	BRI; 20	TEX; 25	NSH; 22		CAL; 37	GTY; 21	RCH; 29	NZH; 24	CLT; 41	DOV; 22	NSH; 26	KEN; 21	MLW; 12		CHI; 25	NHA; 38	PPR; 21	IRP; 43	MCH; 21	BRI; 28	CAL	RCH; 22	DOV	KAN; 42	CLT; 39	MEM	ATL	PHO; 40	DAR; 25	HOM; 20		24th	2414	
2006	Jay Robinson Racing	28	Chevy	DAY	CAL	MXC	LVS	ATL	BRI	TEX	NSH	PHO	TAL	RCH	DAR	CLT	DOV	NSH	KEN	MLW	DAY	CHI	NHA	MAR	GTY	IRP	GLN	MCH	BRI	CAL	RCH; DNQ	DOV	KAN	CLT					NA	-	
2006	Evernham Motorsports	9	Dodge																																MEM; QL^{†}	TEX	PHO	HOM	NA	-	
2010	RAB Racing	09	Ford	DAY	CAL	LVS	BRI	NSH	PHO	TEX	TAL	RCH; 32	DAR	DOV	CLT	NSH	KEN	ROA	NHA	DAY	CHI	GTY	IRP	IOW	GLN	MCH	BRI	CGV	ATL										94th	195	
2010	Baker Curb Racing	27	Ford																											RCH; 36	DOV	KAN	CAL	CLT; 30	GTY	TEX	PHO	HOM	94th	195	
2014	TriStar Motorsports	19	Toyota	DAY	PHO	LVS	BRI	CAL	TEX	DAR	RCH	TAL	IOW	CLT	DOV	MCH	ROA	KEN	DAY	NHA	CHI	IND	IOW	GLN	MOH	BRI; 24	ATL	RCH; 27	CHI	KEN	DOV	KAN	CLT	TEX	PHO	HOM			58th	37	
2015	JGL Racing	26	Toyota	DAY	ATL	LVS	PHO	CAL	TEX	BRI	RCH	TAL	IOW	CLT	DOV	MCH	CHI	DAY	KEN	NHA	IND	IOW	GLN	MOH	BRI; 29	ROA	DAR	RCH; 32	CHI	KEN	DOV	CLT	KAN	TEX	PHO	HOM			65th	27	
2016	TriStar Motorsports	14	Toyota	DAY	ATL	LVS	PHO	CAL	TEX	BRI	RCH	TAL	DOV	CLT	POC	MCH	IOW	DAY	KEN	NHA	IND	IOW	GLN	MOH	BRI; 34	ROA	DAR	RCH; 28	CHI	KEN	DOV	CLT	KAN	TEX	PHO	HOM			65th	20	
2019	RSS Racing	93	Chevy	DAY	ATL	LVS	PHO	CAL	TEX	BRI	RCH	TAL	DOV	CLT	POC	MCH	IOW	CHI	DAY	KEN	NHA	IOW	GLN	MOH	BRI	ROA	DAR	IND	LVS	RCH; 24	CLT	DOV	KAN	TEX	PHO	HOM			71st	13	
^{†} - Qualified for Kasey Kahne

==== Camping World Truck Series ====
NASCAR Camping World Truck Series results
Year	Team	No.	Make	1	2	3	4	5	6	7	8	9	10	11	12	13	14	15	16	17	18	19	20	21	22	23	24	25	NCWTC	Pts	Ref
1995	Sadler Racing	00	Chevy	PHO	TUS	SGS	MMR	POR	EVG	I70	LVL	BRI	MLW	CNS	HPT	IRP	FLM	RCH; 13	MAR; 5	NWS	SON	MMR	PHO						53rd	279	
2000	K-Automotive Motorsports	29	Dodge	DAY	HOM	PHO	MMR	MAR	PIR	GTY	MEM	PPR	EVG	TEX	KEN	GLN	MLW	NHA	NZH	MCH	IRP	NSV	CIC	RCH; 12	DOV; 11	TEX	CAL		65th	262	
2007	Fast Track Racing Enterprises	71	Chevy	DAY	CAL	ATL	MAR	KAN	CLT	MFD	DOV	TEX	MCH	MLW	MEM	KEN	IRP	NSH	BRI	GTW	NHA	LVS	TAL	MAR; 35	ATL	TEX	PHO	HOM	112th	55	
2008	Fast Track Racing Enterprises	48	Chevy	DAY	CAL	ATL	MAR	KAN	CLT	MFD	DOV	TEX	MCH	MLW	MEM	KEN	IRP	NSH	BRI	GTW	NHA	LVS	TAL	MAR; 26	ATL	TEX	PHO	HOM	92nd	85	
2009	Fast Track Racing Enterprises	48	Chevy	DAY	CAL	ATL	MAR; 19	KAN	CLT	DOV	TEX	MCH	MLW	MEM	KEN	IRP	NSH	BRI; 17	CHI	IOW	GTW	NHA	LVS	MAR; 33	TAL	TEX	PHO	HOM	57th	282	
2010	Fast Track Racing Enterprises	48	Chevy	DAY	ATL	MAR; 12	NSH	KAN	DOV	CLT; 19	TEX	MCH; 20	IOW	GTY	IRP	POC	NSH	DAR	BRI; 32	CHI	KEN	NHA	LVS	MAR; 14	TAL	TEX	PHO	HOM; 22	45th	631	

=== ARCA Re/Max Series ===
(key) (Bold – Pole position awarded by qualifying time. Italics – Pole position earned by points standings or practice time. * – Most laps led.)

ARCA Re/Max Series results
Year	Team	No.	Make	1	2	3	4	5	6	7	8	9	10	11	12	13	14	15	16	17	18	19	20	21	22	23	ARSC	Pts	Ref
2003	Sadler Racing	02	Pontiac	DAY	ATL	NSH	SLM	TOL	KEN	CLT	BLN	KAN	MCH; 2	LER	POC	POC	NSH	ISF	WIN	DSF	CHI	SLM	TAL	CLT			66th	430	
2003	Sadler Racing	02	Chevy																						SBO; 3		66th	430	
2006	Fast Track Racing Enterprises	11	Chevy	DAY	NSH	SLM	WIN	KEN	TOL	POC	MCH	KAN	KEN; 17	BLN	POC	GTW	NSH	MCH	ISF	MIL	TOL	DSF	CHI	SLM	TAL	IOW	121st	145	

=== SMART Modified Tour ===
SMART Modified Tour results
Year	Car owner	No.	Make	1	2	3	4	5	6	7	8	9	10	11	12	13	SMTC	Pts	Ref
2021	N/A	17	N/A	CRW	FLO	SBO	FCS	CRW	DIL	CAR	CRW	DOM	PUL; 23	HCY	ACE		52nd	8	
2026	Sadler-Stanley Racing	16VA	N/A	FLO; 18	AND	SBO	DOM	HCY	WKS	FCR	CRW	PUL	CAR	ROU	TRI	NWS	55th	23	
