= 2003 Mountain Dew Southern 500 =

Race details
- Race 25 of 36 in the 2003 NASCAR Winston Cup Series
- 2003 Southern 500 program cover
- Date: August 31, 2003
- Official name: Mountain Dew Southern 500
- Location: Darlington Raceway; Darlington County, South Carolina, U.S.
- Course: Permanent racing facility
- Course length: 1.366 miles (2.198 km)
- Distance: 367 laps, 501.322 mi (806.800 km)
- Weather: Temperatures hovering around 93.2 °F (34.0 °C); wind speeds approaching 8 miles per hour (13 km/h)
- Average speed: 120.733 miles per hour (194.301 km/h)
- Attendance: 75,000

Pole position
Driver	Ryan Newman	Penske Racing
- Time: 29.090

Most laps led
Driver	Ryan Newman	Penske Racing
- Laps: 120

Winner
No. 5	Terry Labonte	Hendrick Motorsports

Television in the United States
- Network: NBC
- Announcers: Allen Bestwick, Benny Parsons and Wally Dallenbach Jr.

The 2003 Mountain Dew Southern 500, the 54th running of the event, was a NASCAR Winston Cup Series race held on August 31, 2003 at Darlington Raceway in Darlington, South Carolina. Contested over 367 laps on the 1.366-mile (2.198-kilometre) speedway, it was the twenty-fifth race of the 2003 NASCAR Winston Cup Series season. Terry Labonte of Hendrick Motorsports won the race, for his 22nd – and ultimately, final – Cup Series win.

It is the last Southern 500 held on Labor Day weekend until 2015.

== Background ==
Layout of Darlington Raceway, the track where the race was held.

Darlington Raceway, nicknamed by many NASCAR fans and drivers as "The Lady in Black" or "The Track Too Tough to Tame" and advertised as a "NASCAR Tradition", is a race track built for NASCAR racing located near Darlington, South Carolina. It is of a unique, somewhat egg-shaped design, an oval with the ends of very different configurations, a condition which supposedly arose from the proximity of one end of the track to a minnow pond the owner refused to relocate. This situation makes it very challenging for the crews to set up their cars' handling in a way that will be effective at both ends.

The track, Darlington Raceway, is a four-turn, 1.366-mile (2.198-kilometre) oval. The track's first two turns are banked at twenty-five degrees, while the final two turns are banked two degrees lower at twenty-three degrees. The front stretch (the location of the finish line) and the back stretch is banked at six degrees. Darlington Raceway can seat up to 60,000 people.

== Results ==
Pos	No.	Driver	Team	Manufacturer	Sponsor	Lap	Laps led	Status
1	5	Terry Labonte	Hendrick Motorsports	Chevrolet	Kellogg's / Got Milk?	367	33	Running
2	29	Kevin Harvick	Richard Childress Racing	Chevrolet	GM Goodwrench Service	367	14	Running
3	48	Jimmie Johnson	Hendrick Motorsports	Chevrolet	Lowe's	367	17	Running
4	42	Jamie McMurray	Chip Ganassi Racing	Dodge	Havoline	367	21	Running
5	9	Bill Elliott	Evernham Motorsports	Dodge	Dodge Dealers / UAW	367	0	Running
6	19	Jeremy Mayfield	Evernham Motorsports	Dodge	Dodge Dealers / UAW / Mountain Dew	367	0	Running
7	18	Bobby Labonte	Joe Gibbs Racing	Chevrolet	Interstate Batteries	367	0	Running
8	32	Ricky Craven	PPI Motorsports	Pontiac	Give Kids the World / Tide	367	0	Running
9	38	Elliott Sadler	Robert Yates Racing	Ford	M&M's	367	0	Running
10	16	Greg Biffle	Roush Racing	Ford	Grainger	367	70	Running
11	99	Jeff Burton	Roush Racing	Ford	MDA / Citgo	367	43	Running
12	20	Tony Stewart	Joe Gibbs Racing	Chevrolet	Home Depot	367	0	Running
13	97	Kurt Busch	Roush Racing	Ford	Rubbermaid	367	0	Running
14	17	Matt Kenseth	Roush Racing	Ford	Smirnoff Ice / DeWalt Power Tools	367	37	Running
15	4	Kevin Lepage	Morgan–McClure Motorsports	Pontiac	Kodak	367	9	Running
16	21	Ricky Rudd	Wood Brothers Racing	Ford	Motorcraft	367	1	Running
17	54	Todd Bodine	BelCar Racing	Ford	National Guard	366	0	Running
18	1	Jeff Green	Dale Earnhardt Inc.	Chevrolet	Pennzoil	365	0	Running
19	22	Ward Burton	Bill Davis Racing	Dodge	Caterpillar	364	0	Running
20	30	Steve Park	Richard Childress Racing	Chevrolet	America Online	364	0	Running
21	25	Joe Nemechek	Hendrick Motorsports	Chevrolet	UAW–Delphi	363	0	Running
22	7	Jimmy Spencer	Ultra Motorsports	Dodge	Sirius Satellite Radio	361	1	Running
23	12	Ryan Newman	Penske Racing	Dodge	Alltel	359	120	Running
24	23	Kenny Wallace	Bill Davis Racing	Dodge	Stacker 2	358	0	Running
25	8	Dale Earnhardt Jr.	Dale Earnhardt Inc.	Chevrolet	Budweiser	358	0	Running
26	0	Jason Leffler	Haas CNC Racing	Pontiac	NetZero Hi Speed	356	0	Running
27	45	Kyle Petty	Petty Enterprises	Dodge	Georgia-Pacific	345	1	Engine
28	31	Robby Gordon	Richard Childress Racing	Chevrolet	Cingular Wireless	336	0	Crash
29	01	Mike Skinner	MB2 Motorsports	Pontiac	U.S. Army	318	0	Running
30	77	Dave Blaney	Jasper Motorsports	Ford	Jasper Engines and Transmissions	316	0	Running
31	40	Sterling Marlin	Chip Ganassi Racing	Dodge	Coors Light	315	0	Running
32	24	Jeff Gordon	Hendrick Motorsports	Chevrolet	DuPont	309	0	Crash
33	6	Mark Martin	Roush Racing	Ford	Viagra	307	0	Running
34	88	Dale Jarrett	Robert Yates Racing	Ford	UPS	302	0	Running
35	41	Casey Mears	Chip Ganassi Racing	Dodge	Target	266	0	Running
36	2	Rusty Wallace	Penske Racing	Dodge	Miller Lite	258	0	Running
37	15	Michael Waltrip	Dale Earnhardt Inc.	Chevrolet	NAPA Auto Parts	251	0	Running
38	49	Ken Schrader	BAM Racing	Dodge	1-800-CALL-ATT	184	0	Crash
39	37	Derrike Cope	Quest Motor Racing	Chevrolet	Friendly's / SP Films	168	0	Crash
40	10	Johnny Benson Jr.	MB2 Motorsports	Pontiac	Valvoline	165	0	Crash
41	02	Hermie Sadler	SCORE Motorsports	Pontiac	GoTeamVA.com	61	0	Electrical
42	74	Tony Raines	BACE Motorsports	Chevrolet	BACE Motorsports	9	0	Crash
43	43	Christian Fittipaldi	Petty Enterprises	Dodge	Cheerios Heart Health	9	0	Crash

=== Failed to qualify ===
- Larry Foyt (#50)

== Race statistics ==
- Time of race: 4:09:08
- Average speed: 120.733 miles per hour (194.301 km/h)
- Pole speed: 169.048 miles per hour (272.056 km/h)
- Cautions: 10 for 55 laps
- Margin of victory: 1.651 seconds
- Lead changes: 24
- Percent of race run under caution: 15.0%
- Average green flag run: 28.4 laps
