= Jeff Stec =

Entrepreneur

Jeff Stec is an entrepreneur and NASCAR team owner.

He was a member of the Mu Tau chapter of Kappa Sigma fraternity, and graduated from Austin Peay State University in 1993 with degrees in exercise science and business management. He soon worked his way up through the ranks and formed Peak Fitness in the Charlotte area in 1999 and began expanding it into a national fitness club franchising company early in 2005.

In 2005 Stec also purchased SCORE Motorsports to field the #66 Ford sponsored by Peak Fitness, with Hermie Sadler and Mike Garvey running the car.

In the 2006 season, the Peak Fitness Racing team changed numbers from #66 to #61 to allow Haas CNC Racing to use the #66 for their Best Buy Sponsorship. The team also tabbed Kevin Lepage for the 2006 season driving duties. In the first quarter of 2006 Stec sold the #61 team to Front Row Motorsports.

== Lawsuits and Bankruptcy ==
In April 2008, Jeffrey R. Stec was listed as a defendant in a lawsuit against Peak Fitness by North Carolina Attorney General Roy Cooper. Stating that Stec and Peak Fitness engaged in a pattern of deceptive conduct, deceptive advertising, instructing sales personnel to misrepresent contract terms and club closings.

In April 2009, Jeff Stec confirmed that locations in Raleigh and Cary, North Carolina will be closed by the end of June 2009. A subsidiary of Stec's Peak Fitness filed Chapter 11 bankruptcy, citing between $500,000 and $1 million in debt.

In June 2011, Stec was formally charged with Loan fraud for intentionally filing for and attempting to use close to 1 Million dollars for a luxury home. In addition, he applied for almost 4 Million Dollars from Wells Fargo to build health clubs stating he was the owner of the parent group of Peak Fitness when he was not. Documents claim Stec alone cost Wells Fargo over $250,000 while also causing Wachovia to lose 2.7 Million Dollars.
