= Red Line Synthetic Oil Corporation =

Synthetic lubricants manufacturer

Red Line Synthetic Oil
- Industry: Chemical
- Founded: 1979 in Novato, California
- Founder: Tim Kerrigan; Peter Filice
- Headquarters: Benicia, California, United States
- Products: Synthetic lubricants
- Owner: Phillips 66 Spectrum Corporation

Red Line Synthetic Oil is a manufacturer of synthetic lubricants based in Benicia, California, in the United States. The company operates as a subsidiary of Phillips 66 Spectrum Corporation.

== History ==
Red Line Synthetic Oil Corporation was established in 1979 by Tim Kerrigan and Peter Filice in Novato, California. Over the years, the company expanded and relocated to Martinez, California, before settling in Benicia, California.

In 1986, Roy Howell, a chemist with a background from Cornell University and employed by Lubrizol, joined Red Line Synthetic Oil Corporation as its Chief Chemist.

In 2014, Phillips 66 acquired Spectrum Corporation, the parent company of Red Line Synthetic Oil.

== Products ==
Red Line initially focused on manufacturing oils specifically for the racing industry, but has since broadened its scope to include mainstream markets. Their product range includes a comprehensive selection of multigrade and monograde polyol ester base stock (Group V) engine and gear lubricants.

== Racing ==
Since 2009, Red Line has served as the designated oil supplier for the Formula Mazda Challenge series. They have established partnerships and contingency programs with various racing disciplines, including drag racing, road racing, time attack, pro stock bike racing, and motorcycle racing.

In 2007, Red Line Synthetic Oil provided sponsorship to touring car racer Eddie Garrison during the Grand Bayou Race Series. Additionally, they sponsored Doug Kalitta's NHRA Top Fuel Dragster starting in 2009, as well as Stillen's Rally-Spec Nissan GT-R.
