= 2005 Batman Begins 400 =

Race details
- Race 15 of 36 in the 2005 NASCAR Nextel Cup Series
- 2005 Batman Begins 400 program cover
- Date: June 19, 2005
- Location: Michigan International Speedway, Brooklyn, Michigan
- Course: Permanent racing facility
- Course length: 2.0 miles (3.219 km)
- Distance: 200 laps, 400 mi (643.737 km)
- Weather: Mild with temperatures approaching 73 °F (23 °C); wind speeds up to 7 miles per hour (11 km/h)
- Average speed: 150.596 miles per hour (242.361 km/h)

Pole position
Driver	Ryan Newman	Penske Racing

Most laps led
Driver	Tony Stewart	Joe Gibbs Racing
- Laps: 97

Winner
No. 16	Greg Biffle	Roush Racing

Television in the United States
- Network: Fox
- Announcers: Mike Joy, Darrell Waltrip, Larry McReynolds
- Nielsen ratings: 4.76

The 2005 Batman Begins 400 (named after the 2005 film of the same name for sponsorship reasons was a NASCAR NEXTEL Cup Series racing event held on June 19, 2005, at Michigan International Speedway in Cambridge Township, Michigan. The race was the fifteenth in the 2005 NASCAR Nextel Cup Series season.

== Entry list ==
Car #	Driver	Make	Team
0	Mike Bliss	Chevrolet	Gene Haas
01	Joe Nemechek	Chevrolet	Nelson Bowers
2	Rusty Wallace	Dodge	Roger Penske
4	Mike Wallace	Chevrolet	Larry McClure
5	Kyle Busch	Chevrolet	Rick Hendrick
6	Mark Martin	Ford	Jack Roush
07	Dave Blaney	Chevrolet	Richard Childress
7	Robby Gordon	Chevrolet	James Smith
8	Dale Earnhardt Jr	Chevrolet	Teresa Earnhardt
9	Kasey Kahne	Dodge	Ray Evernham
10	Scott Riggs	Chevrolet	James Rocco
11	Jason Leffler	Chevrolet	J D Gibbs
12	Ryan Newman	Dodge	Roger Penske
15	Michael Waltrip	Chevrolet	Teresa Earnhardt
16	Greg Biffle	Ford	Geoff Smith
17	Matt Kenseth	Ford	Mark Martin
18	Bobby Labonte	Chevrolet	Joe Gibbs
19	Jeremy Mayfield	Dodge	Ray Evernham
20	Tony Stewart	Chevrolet	Joe Gibbs
21	Ricky Rudd	Ford	Glen Wood
22	Scott Wimmer	Dodge	Bill Davis
23	Mike Skinner	Dodge	Gail Davis
24	Jeff Gordon	Chevrolet	Rick Hendrick
25	Brian Vickers	Chevrolet	Mary Hendrick
29	Kevin Harvick	Chevrolet	Richard Childress
31	Jeff Burton	Chevrolet	Richard Childress
32	Bobby Hamilton Jr	Chevrolet	Calvin Wells III
34	PJ Jones	Chevrolet	William Edwards
37	Kevin Lepage	Dodge	John Carter
38	Elliott Sadler	Ford	Robert Yates
40	Sterling Marlin	Dodge	Felix Sabates
41	Casey Mears	Dodge	Chip Ganassi
42	Jamie McMurray	Dodge	Floyd Ganassi
43	Jeff Green	Dodge	Richard L Petty
45	Kyle Petty	Dodge	Kyle Petty
48	Jimmie Johnson	Chevrolet	Jeff Gordon
49	Ken Schrader	Dodge	Elizabeth Morgenthau
66	Mike Garvey	Ford	Jeff Stec
77	Travis Kvapil	Dodge	Douglas Bawel
88	Dale Jarrett	Ford	Robert Yates
89	Morgan Shepherd	Dodge	Cindy Shepherd
91	Bill Elliott	Dodge	Ray Evernham Sr.
97	Kurt Busch	Ford	Georgetta Roush
99	Carl Edwards	Ford	Jack Roush
51	Stuart Kirby	Chevrolet	Joe Auer
79	Derrike Cope	Chevrolet	John Conely
92	Eric McClure	Chevrolet	Bob Jenkins

== Practice ==
=== Practice 1 results ===
Pos.	Car #	Driver	Make	Speed	Time	Behind	Best	Laps
1	12	Ryan Newman	Dodge	192.164	0:37.468	0.000	0	0
2	5	Kyle Busch	Chevrolet	191.428	0:37.612	0.144	0	0
3	41	Casey Mears	Dodge	191.255	0:37.646	0.178	0	0
Full results

=== Practice 2 results ===
Pos.	Car #	Driver	Make	Speed	Time	Behind	Best	Laps
1	19	Jeremy Mayfield	Dodge	192.097	0:37.481	0.000	0	0
2	12	Ryan Newman	Dodge	192.097	0:37.481	0.000	0	0
3	48	Jimmie Johnson	Chevrolet	191.729	0:37.553	0.072	0	0
Full results

== Qualifying ==
Pos.	Car #	Driver	Make	Speed	Time	Behind
1	12	Ryan Newman	Dodge	194.232	37.069	0.000
2	41	Casey Mears	Dodge	193.757	37.160	-0.091
3	20	Tony Stewart	Chevrolet	193.512	37.207	-0.138
4	9	Kasey Kahne	Dodge	193.123	37.282	-0.213
5	19	Jeremy Mayfield	Dodge	193.086	37.289	-0.220
6	18	Bobby Labonte	Chevrolet	193.055	37.295	-0.226
7	25	Brian Vickers	Chevrolet	192.818	37.341	-0.272
8	7	Robby Gordon	Chevrolet	192.771	37.350	-0.281
9	24	Jeff Gordon	Chevrolet	192.658	37.372	-0.303
10	91	Bill Elliott	Dodge	192.658	37.372	-0.303
11	1	Joe Nemechek	Chevrolet	192.606	37.382	-0.313
12	2	Rusty Wallace	Dodge	192.555	37.392	-0.323
13	97	Kurt Busch	Ford	192.555	37.392	-0.323
14	88	Dale Jarrett	Ford	192.493	37.404	-0.335
15	6	Mark Martin	Ford	192.380	37.426	-0.357
16	48	Jimmie Johnson	Chevrolet	192.313	37.439	-0.370
17	5	Kyle Busch	Chevrolet	192.225	37.456	-0.387
18	38	Elliott Sadler	Ford	192.102	37.480	-0.411
19	43	Jeff Green	Dodge	191.980	37.504	-0.435
20	00	Mike Bliss	Chevrolet	191.980	37.504	-0.435
21	17	Matt Kenseth	Ford	191.627	37.573	-0.504
22	22	Scott Wimmer	Dodge	191.627	37.573	-0.504
23	99	Carl Edwards	Ford	191.413	37.615	-0.546
24	42	Jamie McMurray	Dodge	191.306	37.636	-0.567
25	16	Greg Biffle	Ford	191.189	37.659	-0.590
26	11	Jason Leffler	Chevrolet	191.189	37.659	-0.590
27	32	Bobby Hamilton Jr	Chevrolet	190.739	37.748	-0.679
28	29	Kevin Harvick	Chevrolet	190.587	37.778	-0.709
29	10	Scott Riggs	Chevrolet	190.582	37.779	-0.710
30	15	Michael Waltrip	Chevrolet	190.491	37.797	-0.728
31	23	Mike Skinner	Dodge	190.376	37.820	-0.751
32	45	Kyle Petty	Dodge	190.370	37.821	-0.752
33	31	Jeff Burton	Chevrolet	190.179	37.859	-0.790
34	21	Ricky Rudd	Ford	190.129	37.869	-0.800
35	66	Mike Garvey	Ford	189.878	37.919	-0.850
36	07	Dave Blaney	Chevrolet	189.783	37.938	-0.869
37	77	Travis Kvapil	Dodge	189.783	37.938	-0.869
38	49	Ken Schrader	Dodge	189.579	37.979	-0.910
39	37	Kevin Lepage	Dodge	189.449	38.005	-0.936
40	40	Sterling Marlin	Dodge	189.404	38.014	-0.945
41	8	Dale Earnhardt Jr	Chevrolet	188.260	38.245	-1.176
42	4	Mike Wallace	Chevrolet	186.591	38.587	-1.518
43	51	Stuart Kirby	Chevrolet	188.848	38.126	-1.057
Failed to qualify
44	92	Eric McClure*	Chevrolet	0.000	0.000	0.000
45	79	Derrike Cope	Chevrolet	N/A	N/A	N/A
46	34	P.J. Jones	Chevrolet	N/A	N/A	N/A
47	89	Morgan Shepherd	Dodge	N/A	N/A	N/A
WD	00	Carl Long	Chevrolet	0.000	0.000	0.000

*Had an accident during qualifying

== Race recap ==
On April 27, 2005, Warner Bros. would announce that the race would be sponsored by the movie Batman Begins, marking the first time a motion picture sponsored a Cup Series race. In a press release, NASCAR CEO and chairman Brian France said "Batman will cheer on the 43 super heroes that will be competing for the Batman Begins 400 at Michigan International Speedway." Along with the sponsorship, a Batmobile used in the film served as the honorary pace car for the race, while Batman, played by actor Kevin Porter, was the grand marshal, and Karen Newman sang the national anthem.

Mark Martin also ran a Batman Begins paint scheme, along with Ricky Craven at the Paramount Health Insurance 200 on the previous day. Defending race winner Ryan Newman of Penske Racing won the pole position after breaking the track record with a speed of 194.232 miles per hour (312.586 km/h), breaking the original record held by Dale Earnhardt Jr. in 2001, while Roush Racing's Greg Biffle won the race. Michigan International Speedway has been a Ford dominated track starting in 1984, and a Mercury track before that from 1969-78. It was also a track that suited a smooth driver or a driver that could change his driving tactics for Michigan International Speedway.

Tony Stewart would dominate the race, he would end up leading a race-high 97 laps. However, on lap 168, Stewart took a four-tire pit stop, while Greg Biffle, Elliott Sadler and Roush Racing teammates Matt Kenseth, Carl Edwards and Kurt Busch, as they and other drivers had pitted 12 laps earlier; Joe Nemechek and Michael Waltrip also beat Stewart to the track, forcing him to start in eighth on lap 174. Biffle, who led 67 laps, would go on to win his eighth career Cup race and fifth of the season. Stewart was able to fight his way into second, while Mark Martin finished in third. Kenseth and Edwards rounded out the top five. Jeff Gordon and Dale Earnhardt Jr. finished the race in 32nd and 17th, respectively, and were knocked out of contention for the 2005 Chase for the Nextel Cup.

== Race results ==
Fin	St	#	Driver	Make	Laps	Led	Status	Pts	Winnings
1	25	16	Greg Biffle	Ford	200	63	running	185	171075
2	3	20	Tony Stewart	Chevy	200	97	running	180	174461
3	15	6	Mark Martin	Ford	200	10	running	170	116125
4	21	17	Matt Kenseth	Ford	200	0	running	160	138261
5	23	99	Carl Edwards	Ford	200	0	running	155	98650
6	11	01	Joe Nemechek	Chevy	200	1	running	155	110148
7	30	15	Michael Waltrip	Chevy	200	3	running	151	116454
8	18	38	Elliott Sadler	Ford	200	0	running	142	126106
9	17	5	Kyle Busch	Chevy	200	0	running	138	89265
10	12	2	Rusty Wallace	Dodge	200	0	running	134	110548
11	33	31	Jeff Burton	Chevy	200	0	running	130	106825
12	13	97	Kurt Busch	Ford	200	12	running	132	125665
13	24	42	Jamie McMurray	Dodge	200	1	running	129	87390
14	6	18	Bobby Labonte	Chevy	200	0	running	121	110915
15	1	12	Ryan Newman	Dodge	200	3	running	123	122781
16	22	22	Scott Wimmer	Dodge	200	0	running	115	101798
17	41	8	Dale Earnhardt Jr.	Chevy	200	0	running	112	118448
18	4	9	Kasey Kahne	Dodge	200	0	running	109	106965
19	16	48	Jimmie Johnson	Chevy	200	2	running	111	118881
20	26	11	Jason Leffler	Chevy	200	0	running	103	75890
21	2	41	Casey Mears	Dodge	199	7	running	105	107248
22	5	19	Jeremy Mayfield	Dodge	199	0	running	97	99535
23	29	10	Scott Riggs	Chevy	199	0	running	94	93448
24	14	88	Dale Jarrett	Ford	199	0	running	91	106698
25	28	29	Kevin Harvick	Chevy	199	0	running	88	116351
26	37	77	Travis Kvapil	Dodge	199	0	running	85	79965
27	20	0	Mike Bliss	Chevy	198	0	running	82	71680
28	38	49	Ken Schrader	Dodge	198	0	running	79	71425
29	36	07	Dave Blaney	Chevy	198	0	running	76	79215
30	32	45	Kyle Petty	Dodge	198	0	running	73	80687
31	27	32	Bobby Hamilton Jr.	Chevy	198	0	running	70	67990
32	9	24	Jeff Gordon	Chevy	197	0	running	67	116651
33	34	21	Ricky Rudd	Ford	197	0	running	64	96004
34	31	23	Mike Skinner	Dodge	197	0	running	61	67735
35	10	91	Bill Elliott	Dodge	196	0	running	58	67595
36	35	66	Mike Garvey	Ford	196	0	running	55	67545
37	39	37	Kevin Lepage	Dodge	195	0	running	52	67495
38	19	43	Jeff Green	Dodge	184	0	running	49	96331
39	8	7	Robby Gordon	Chevy	182	1	running	51	67350
40	40	40	Sterling Marlin	Dodge	167	0	engine	43	95223
41	7	25	Brian Vickers	Chevy	154	0	running	40	75280
42	43	51	Stuart Kirby	Chevy	91	0	crash	37	67240
43	42	4	Mike Wallace	Chevy	50	0	engine	34	66671

== Standings ==
Pos	Driver	Points
1	Jimmie Johnson	2173
2	Greg Biffle	2124
3	Elliott Sadler	1923
4	Carl Edwards	1914
5	Mark Martin	1904
6	Tony Stewart	1862
7	Ryan Newman	1856
8	Rusty Wallace	1848
9	Kurt Busch	1813
10	Kevin Harvick	1803

Previous race: 2005 Pocono 500	Nextel Cup Series; 2005 season	Next race: 2005 Dodge/Save Mart 350
