= Johnny Sauter =

American racing driver (born 1978)

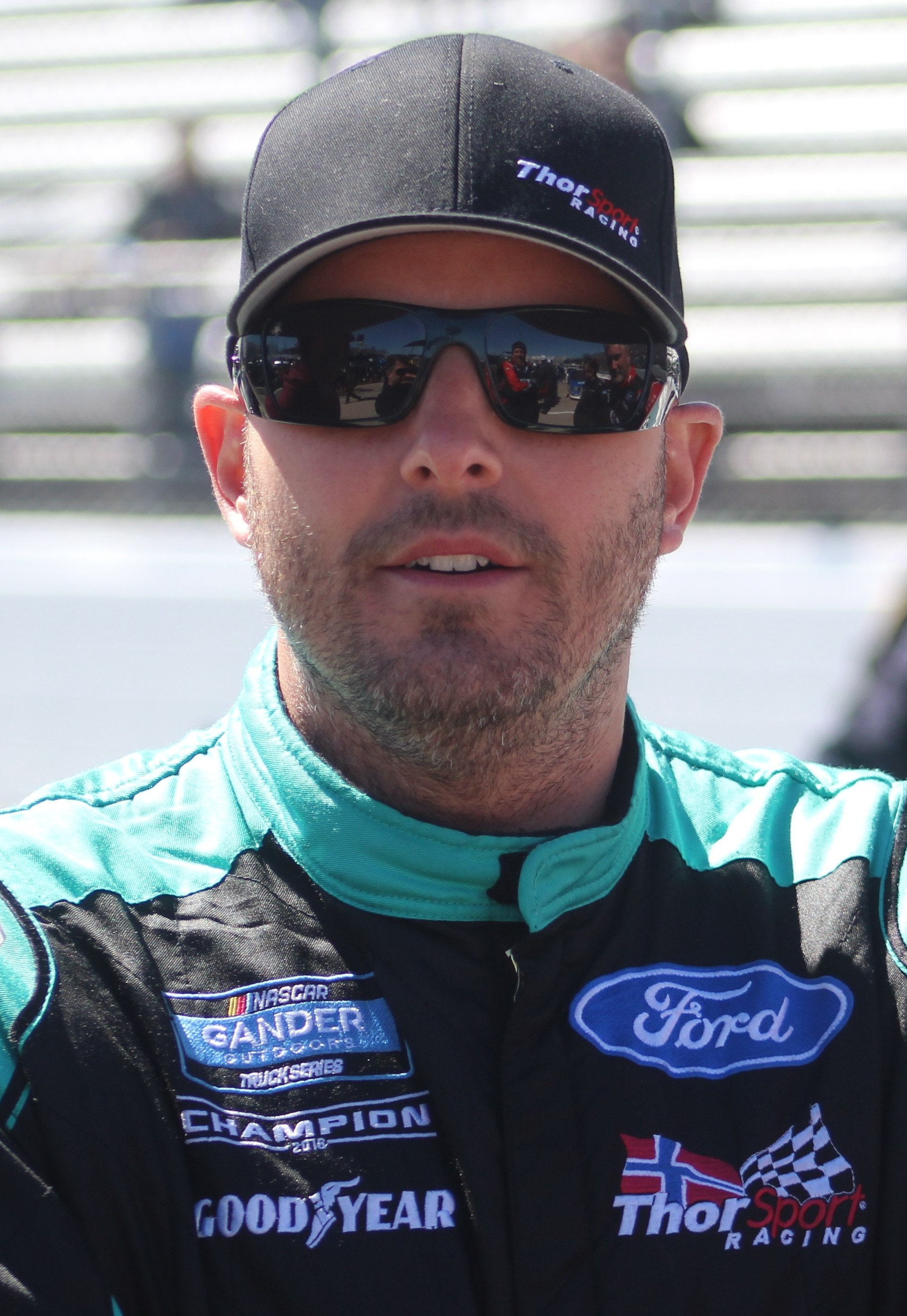
- Sauter at Martinsville Speedway in 2019
- Born: Jonathan Joseph Sauter; May 1, 1978 (age 48); Necedah, Wisconsin, U.S.
- Achievements: 2016 NASCAR Camping World Truck Series Champion; 2018 NASCAR Camping World Truck Series Regular Season Champion; 2017 Oktoberfest winner 2001 ASA National Tour Champion
- Awards: 2009 Camping World Truck Series Rookie of the Year; 2001 ASA National Tour Rookie of the Year

NASCAR Cup Series career
- 85 races run over 11 years
- 2015 position: 61st
- Best finish: 30th (2007)
- First race: 2003 Tropicana 400 (Chicagoland)
- Last race: 2015 Daytona 500 (Daytona)
Wins	Top tens	Poles
0	3	0

NASCAR O'Reilly Auto Parts Series career
- 207 races run over 12 years
- 2018 position: 99th
- Best finish: 8th (2003, 2006)
- First race: 2001 Autolite / Fram 250 (Richmond)
- Last race: 2018 Lake Region 200 (New Hampshire)
- First win: 2002 Tropicana Twister 300 (Chicagoland)
- Last win: 2005 SBC 250 (Milwaukee)
Wins	Top tens	Poles
3	50	4

NASCAR FedEx Freight Truck Series career
- 326 races run over 22 years
- 2025 position: 49th
- Best finish: 1st (2016)
- First race: 2003 O'Reilly 200 (Bristol)
- Last race: 2025 Fresh From Florida 250 (Daytona)
- First win: 2009 Las Vegas 350 (Las Vegas)
- Last win: 2019 JEGS 200 (Dover)
Wins	Top tens	Poles
24	186	9
- Statistics up to date as of October 31, 2025.

Jonathan Joseph Sauter (born May 1, 1978) is an American professional stock car racing driver. He last competed part-time in the NASCAR Craftsman Truck Series, driving the No. 66 Ford F-150 for ThorSport Racing. He has also driven in the NASCAR Cup Series and NASCAR Xfinity Series in the past. Sauter is the son of former NASCAR driver Jim Sauter, the brother of NASCAR drivers Tim Sauter and Jay Sauter, and the uncle of Travis Sauter. He is the 2016 Truck Series champion.

== Racing career ==
=== Early career ===
After graduating high school in 1996, Sauter began competing in various amateur series throughout Wisconsin and the Midwest. By the end of 1997, Sauter had collected three wins in the Sportsman Division at Dells Raceway Park and a win in the Late Model Division at the La Crosse Fairgrounds Speedway. Sauter then joined the American Speed Association Series in 1998. By 2001, he was the ASA Series Champion.

=== NASCAR ===
==== 2001–2008 ====
In 2001, following Sauter's ASA Championship, Richard Childress Racing invited him to drive the No. 21 Rockwell Automation Chevrolet in five Busch Series races. Sauter finished in the top fifteen in three of his five Busch starts, including a fifth-place finish in the AutoLite Fram 250 at Richmond, which was his first start in the series.

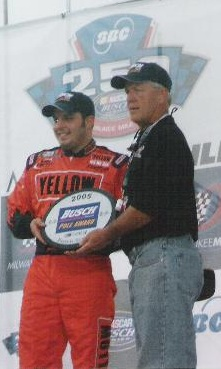
Sauter receiving the Busch Pole Award for the 2005 SBC 250, a race which he would later win.

In 2002, Childress hired Sauter to run a full Busch Series schedule in the No. 2 AC Delco Chevrolet. He notched five top-ten finishes, including his first Busch Series win in the Tropicana Twister 300 at the Chicagoland Speedway, despite skipping one race. Sauter was involved in one of the biggest accidents in NASCAR history in the Aaron's 312 at Talladega, where 33 of 43 cars were involved, and fifteen of them were taken out of the race. In 2003, Sauter drove for Childress Racing and the Curb Agajanian Performance Group in the Busch Series, piloting the No. 21 PayDay Chevrolet and the No. 43 Channellock/Curb Records Chevrolet. He captured fourteen top-ten finishes in 34 Busch Series starts, including a win at Richmond in the No. 43. Sauter finished the 2003 season eighth in the driver standings and, together with Kevin Harvick, led the No. 21 car to the owners' points championship.

During the 2003 season, Sauter also made his Winston Cup debut, driving the No. 4 Kodak Easy Share Pontiac Grand Prix for five races with Morgan-McClure Motorsports. His best start in five races was a 23rd at Loudon, and he also missed a race at Kansas Speedway. He also ran three races in the Craftsman Truck Series for Fasscore Motorsports and had a tenth-place run at Richmond. Childress hired Sauter to drive the No. 30 American Online Chevrolet in Winston Cup full-time in 2004. After thirteen races, he was replaced by Dave Blaney, but later attempted two races in Childress' No. 33 car, but did not qualify for either of them. Towards the end of the season, he began running the No. 09 Miccosukee Gaming & Resorts Dodge Intrepid for Phoenix Racing and had a best finish of 29th. He also ran a full Busch schedule with Brewco Motorsports that season, driving the No. 27 Kleenex Pontiac Grand Prix and Chevy Monte Carlo to an 18th-place points finish.

Sauter joined Phoenix full-time in 2005, with Yellow Transportation becoming the team's primary sponsor. He had eleven top-ten finishes and a win at his home track at Milwaukee and improved his position in points to twelfth for the year. However, Sauter was disqualified at Texas after his car failed a post-race inspection. Sauter and Phoenix also competed in ten Cup races, posting a ninth place finish at Phoenix.

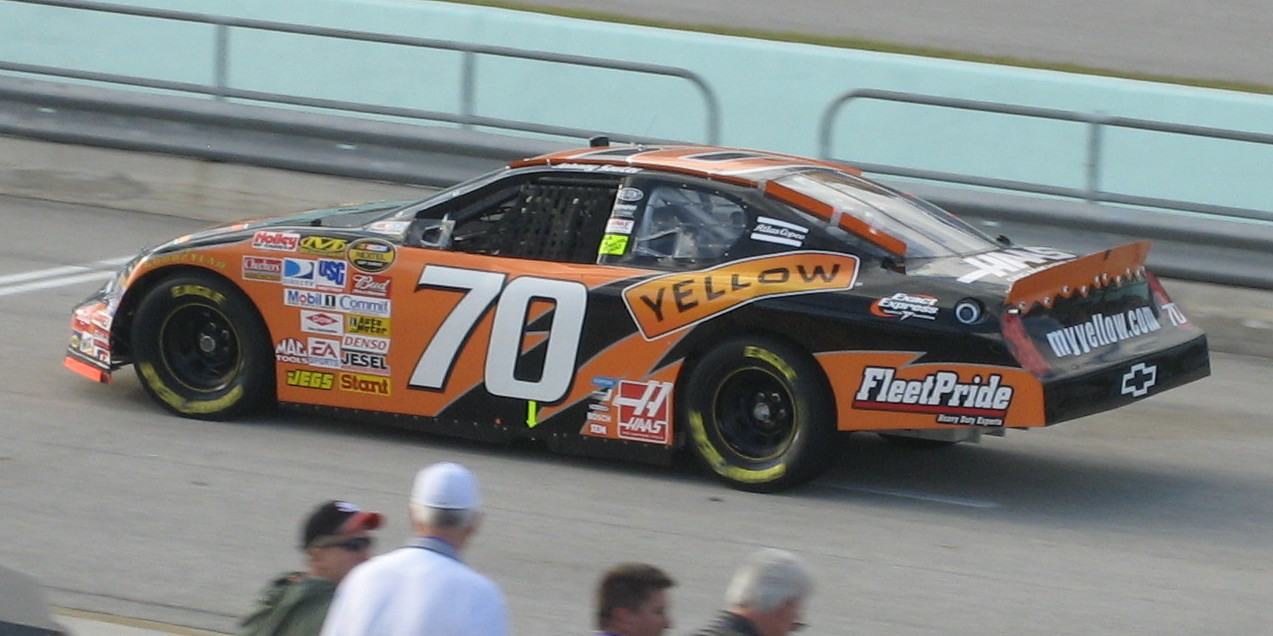
Sauter practicing for the 2007 Ford 400 at the Homestead-Miami Speedway.

After the 2005 season, Sauter and Yellow moved to the No. 00 Haas CNC Racing Chevrolet for the next season. He had one pole and nine top-tens and tied his best finish of eighth in series points. He made one Cup start that season that year at the Coca-Cola 600 and finished 24th. He moved up to a new Cup team for a new team for Haas, the No. 70, in 2007. Driving with sponsorships from Yellow, Best Buy, Haas Automation, and Radioactive Energy Drink, Sauter had two top-tens but finished thirtieth in points. He competed in six Busch races that year with Jay Robinson Racing, but could not finish higher than 23rd.

Sauter was dropped from the No. 70 after the season and rejoined Phoenix Racing for the 2008 season, where he was released after five races. He then spent time as a substitute driver for many teams, starting at Las Vegas Motor Speedway, where he was unable to qualify for the No. 21 McKee Foods Ford. He soon returned to Haas to drive several races in their No. 70, with a best finish of twentieth, as well as attempting several races for John Carter. After one-off starts for Fitz Motorsports and Bob Schacht in the Nationwide Series, he drove for Curb Agajanian Performance Group and Derrike Cope Racing, but did not complete a race for either team. He also drove one Truck race at Martinsville for SS-Green Light Racing.

==== 2009–2021: Full-time in the Truck Series ====
Sauter returned to the trucks in 2009, replacing Shelby Howard in the No. 13 FunSand truck for ThorSport Racing in association with Cary Agajanian. Sauter won his first-ever Truck Series race at the Las Vegas, holding off teammate Matt Crafton for the win. Sauter beat Tayler Malsam in the NASCAR Rookie of the Year standings. For 2010, Sauter attempted the No. 35 Chevy for Tommy Baldwin Racing for three races and took over the No. 36 ride after Phoenix with little success. He also drove some late-season races for Prism Motorsports in the No. 66 Toyota. He picked up his second career truck win in 2010 at Kansas after a late race collision and save with Ron Hornaday Jr.

Sauter grabbed his third career victory at Martinsville in 2011, battling Kyle Busch on the last lap. Despite winning the season-finale at the Ford 200, he lost the championship to Austin Dillon by six points.

He would win the 2012 WinStar World Casino 400K with a ThorSport Racing 1–2 finish alongside Matt Crafton.

In 2013, Sauter started the season with his first win at Daytona International Speedway in the NextEra Energy Resources 250. It was also Toyota's one-hundredth Camping World Truck Series win. On April 6, Sauter won the Kroger 250 at Martinsville Speedway. It was only the second time in Truck Series history that someone had won back-to-back season-opening wins since Mark Martin did it in 2006.

While competing full-time in the Truck Series, Sauter raced several times in his home state of Wisconsin in 2015. He appeared at the Slinger Nationals at Slinger Super Speedway, won an ARCA Midwest Tour race at Madison International Speedway, the Larry Detjens Memorial Race at State Park Speedway, and set a new Super Late Model track record at an ARCA Midwest Tour race at Wisconsin International Raceway.

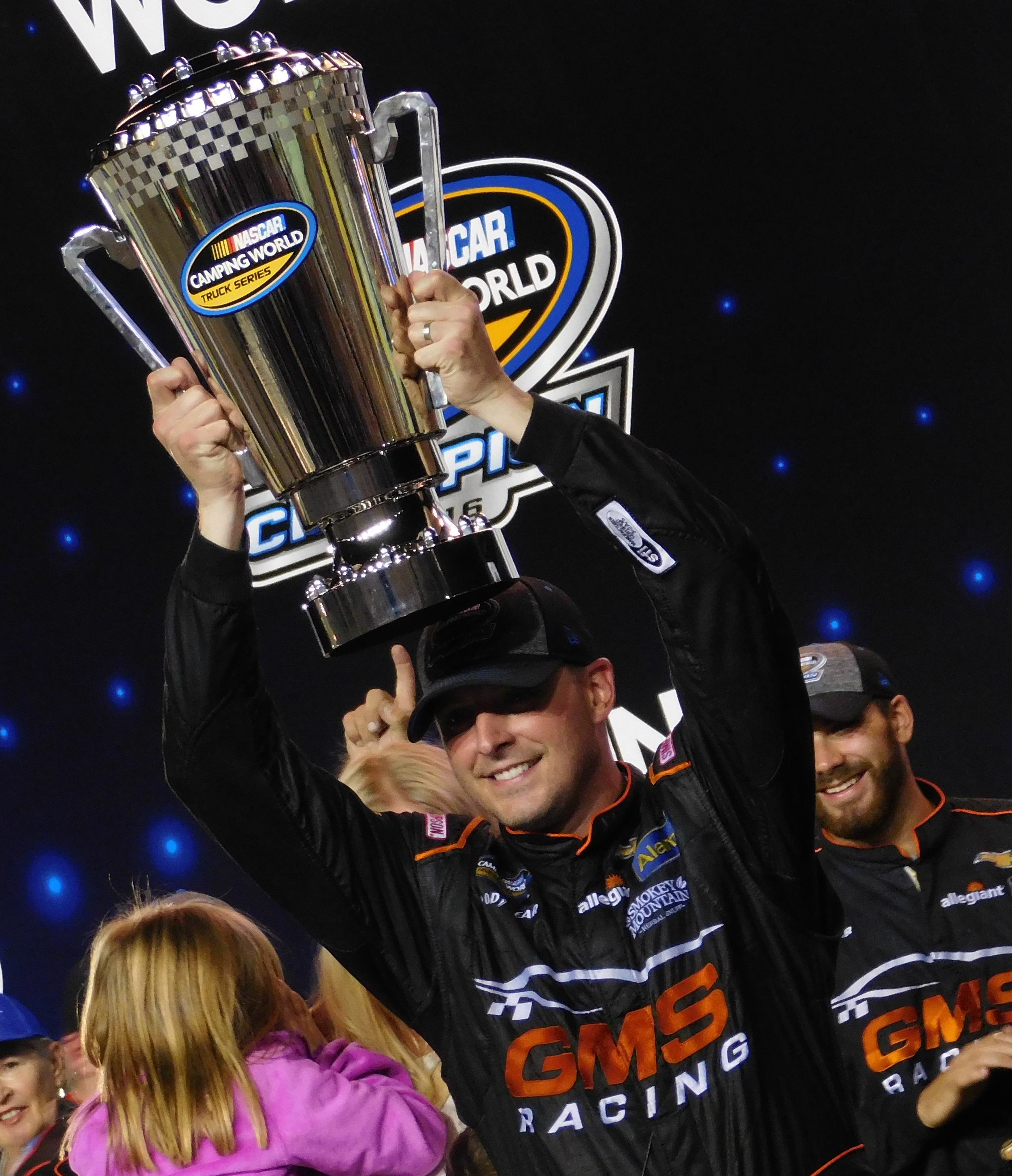
Sauter after winning the 2016 NASCAR Camping World Truck Series Championship

On October 15, 2015, Sauter announced that he would be joining GMS Racing for 2016. Sauter won in his debut with GMS at Daytona. In the Chase, Sauter won at Martinsville and Texas to advance to the championship 4. Sauter went on to win the championship at Homestead, finishing third in the race. Sauter had a successful 2017 season, winning Dover in early June, had a couple of stage wins, and had been consistent all year long. He won his second race of the year at Chicagoland in September. Sauter won Texas and Phoenix, which advanced him to the final round at Homestead Miami. He finished third in the race but Christopher Bell, who finished runner-up, took the championship, and Sauter finished second in the standings by just one point. Sauter opened up 2018 by winning the Daytona race for the third time in his career. He would subsequently win at Dover, Charlotte, Texas, Bristol, and Martinsville and finish fourth in points.

In May 2018, Sauter returned to the Nationwide (now Xfinity) Series at Dover; he drove the No. 23 GMS car in place of the suspended Spencer Gallagher. He ran the race at New Hampshire Motor Speedway as well in the summer, finishing nineteenth.

On January 9, 2019, GMS announced the team had parted ways with Sauter. He later rejoined ThorSport to drive the No. 13. Sauter won his first race of the season at Dover in May. At Iowa, Sauter was parked by NASCAR for wrecking Austin Hill under caution on lap 139 of 200. As a result of the incident, he was suspended for the following week's race at Gateway, although he was given a waiver, allowing him to remain playoff eligible if he won a race. Myatt Snider was announced to substitute for Sauter at Gateway. Sauter was eliminated from the playoffs at Las Vegas when he finished 29th after experiencing an engine failure that also plagued three other trucks. Ilmor, the manufacturer of the engines, took responsibility for the NT1 engines that suffered from severe detonation due to the combination of the high engine load condition combined with the extreme weather conditions in Las Vegas. Despite Ilmor's announcement, NASCAR denied ThorSport's request to reinstate Sauter and Grant Enfinger into the playoffs. At Talladega, Sauter appeared to have won the race, but was penalized and placed in fourteenth for blocking Riley Herbst below the yellow line on the final lap, effectively giving the win to Spencer Boyd. He finished 6th in the final standings.

In 2020, Sauter failed to win a race for the first time since 2015, as well as missed the Truck Series playoffs for the first time since it was implemented in 2016. On top of that, that year was the first time that Sauter finished outside the top-ten in the Truck Series final standings when running full-time in the series (he finished thirteenth in the 2020 standings). In 2021, ThorSport Racing switched manufacturers from Ford back to Toyota (their manufacturer from 2012 to 2017). Despite that, Sauter's season wasn't much better; he missed the playoffs, went winless again, and finished twelfth in the final standings.

==== 2022–present ====
After his two disappointing seasons in 2020 and 2021, Sauter was not retained as a full-time driver at ThorSport and instead was demoted to drive part-time for the team in 2022, while Ty Majeski, who had driven part-time for ThorSport in 2021, would be promoted to full-time in 2022, replacing Sauter. He ran the season-opener at Daytona in the No. 47 truck for the new G2G Racing team. He would be locked into the race through his champion provisional. He also would drive the Young's Motorsports No. 02 truck in the season-finale at Phoenix. That race had previously been a scheduled start for Jesse Little, who decided to retire from driving after his start in the truck at Bristol in September. On February 2, 2023, it was announced that Sauter would drive for G2G at Daytona again. Originally, he was going to drive their No. 47 truck. However, when the entry list was released, he would be in their No. 46 truck. On February 14, the Tuesday before the race, Sauter was replaced by Norm Benning on the Daytona entry list in the No. 46. Neither team nor Sauter stated the reason for the driver change. On April 19, 2023, it was announced that Sauter would replace Kaden Honeycutt as the driver of the No. 04 truck for Roper Racing after Honeycutt's deal to run the first six races of the year with the team ended.

== Personal life ==
Sauter lives and resides in Necedah, Wisconsin, with his family. He enjoys flying, fishing, and playing the banjo in his free time. He is of the Catholic faith.

== Motorsports career results ==
=== Racing career summary ===
Season	Series	Team	Races	Wins	Top 5	Top 10	Points	Position
1998	ASA AC-Delco Challenge Series	N/A	7	0	1	3	948	23rd
2000	ASA AC-Delco Challenge Series	N/A	8	0	0	1	675	39th
2001	ASA AC-Delco Challenge Series	N/A	20	10	15	16	3489	**1st**
2001	ARCA Re/Max Series	Cavin Councilor	1	0	0	1	190	121st
2001	NASCAR Busch Series	Richard Childress Racing	5	0	1	1	545	55th
2002	NASCAR Busch Series	Richard Childress Racing	33	1	3	6	3538	15th
2003	NASCAR Craftsman Truck Series	Fasscore Motorsports	3	0	0	1	286	69th
2003	NASCAR Busch Series	Curb Racing	17	1	1	7	4098	8th
2003	NASCAR Busch Series	Richard Childress Racing	17	0	5	7	4098	8th
2003	NASCAR Winston Cup Series	Morgan-McClure Motorsports	5	0	0	0	356	51st
2004	NASCAR Craftsman Truck Series	Curb-Agajanian Performance Group	2	0	1	1	310	54th
2004	NASCAR Busch Series	Brewco Motorsports	34	0	4	8	3411	18th
2004	NASCAR Nextel Cup Series	Richard Childress Racing	13	0	0	0	1430	36th
2004	NASCAR Nextel Cup Series	Phoenix Racing	3	0	0	0	1430	36th
2005	NASCAR Craftsman Truck Series	Billy Balew Motorsports	1	0	0	0	288	59th
2005	NASCAR Craftsman Truck Series	Curb Racing	1	0	0	0	288	59th
2005	NASCAR Craftsman Truck Series	ThorSport Racing	1	0	0	0	288	59th
2005	NASCAR Busch Series	Phoenix Racing	35	1	5	11	3695	12th
2005	NASCAR Nextel Cup Series	Phoenix Racing	10	0	0	1	722	43rd
2006	NASCAR Craftsman Truck Series	Billy Balew Motorsports	1	0	0	0	224	57th
2006	NASCAR Craftsman Truck Series	Sutton Motorsports	1	0	0	0	224	57th
2006	NASCAR Busch Series	Haas CNC Racing	35	0	2	9	3794	8th
2006	NASCAR Nextel Cup Series	Haas CNC Racing	1	0	0	0	0	77th
2007	NASCAR Busch Series	Jay Robinson Racing	6	0	0	0	587	66th
2007	NASCAR Busch Series	Brewco Motorsports	2	0	0	0	587	66th
2007	NASCAR Nextel Cup Series	Haas CNC Racing	35	0	1	2	2875	30th
2007	ARCA Re/Max Series	Country Joe Racing	1	0	0	0	125	136th
2008	NASCAR Craftsman Truck Series	SS-Green Light Racing	1	0	0	0	94	87th
2008	NASCAR Nationwide Series	Phoenix Racing	5	0	0	0	752	54th
2008	NASCAR Nationwide Series	Bob Schacht Motorsports	1	0	0	0	752	54th
2008	NASCAR Nationwide Series	Fitz Motorsports	1	0	0	0	752	54th
2008	NASCAR Nationwide Series	Curb-Agajanian Performance Group	2	0	0	0	752	54th
2008	NASCAR Nationwide Series	CFK Motorsports	3	0	0	0	752	54th
2008	NASCAR Sprint Cup Series	Haas CNC Racing	8	0	0	0	387	53rd
2008	NASCAR Sprint Cup Series	E&M Motorsports	1	0	0	0	387	53rd
2009	NASCAR Camping World Truck Series	ThorSport Racing	25	1	7	13	3331	6th
2010	NASCAR Camping World Truck Series	ThorSport Racing	25	1	14	16	3676	**3rd**
2010	NASCAR Nationwide Series	Blanton Motorsports	1	0	0	0	419	75th
2010	NASCAR Nationwide Series	Curb Racing	2	0	0	0	419	75th
2010	NASCAR Nationwide Series	R3 Motorsports	1	0	0	0	419	75th
2010	NASCAR Nationwide Series	Front Row Motorsports	1	0	0	0	419	75th
2010	NASCAR Sprint Cup Series	Tommy Baldwin Racing	4	0	0	0	154	60th
2011	NASCAR Camping World Truck Series	ThorSport Racing	25	2	11	16	882	**2nd**
2011	NASCAR Sprint Cup Series	Robby Gordon Motorsports	1	0	0	0	0	NC†
2012	NASCAR Camping World Truck Series	ThorSport Racing	22	2	6	9	678	9th
2012	NASCAR Nationwide Series	NEMCO Motorsports	1	0	0	0	0	NC†
2013	NASCAR Camping World Truck Series	ThorSport Racing	22	3	9	14	732	4th
2013	NASCAR Sprint Cup Series	Phil Parsons Racing	2	0	0	0	0	NC†
2014	NASCAR Camping World Truck Series	ThorSport Racing	22	1	8	16	773	4th
2014	NASCAR Nationwide Series	Hattori Racing Enterprises	3	0	0	0	0	NC†
2014	NASCAR Sprint Cup Series	BK Racing	1	0	0	0	0	NC†
2015	NASCAR Camping World Truck Series	ThorSport Racing	23	0	7	16	809	4th
2015	NASCAR Sprint Cup Series	BK Racing	1	0	0	0	0	NC†
2016	NASCAR Camping World Truck Series	GMS Racing	23	3	12	19	4030	**1st**
2017	NASCAR Camping World Truck Series	GMS Racing	23	4	13	19	4034	**2nd**
2018	NASCAR Camping World Truck Series	GMS Racing	23	6	14	17	4025	4th
2018	NASCAR Xfinity Series	GMS Racing	2	0	0	1	0	NC†
2019	NASCAR Gander Outdoors Truck Series	ThorSport Racing	22	1	4	11	2238	6th
2020	NASCAR Gander Outdoors Truck Series	ThorSport Racing	23	0	3	8	523	13th
2021	NASCAR Camping World Truck Series	ThorSport Racing	22	0	5	8	505	12th
2022	NASCAR Camping World Truck Series	G2G Racing	1	0	0	0	116	35th
2022	NASCAR Camping World Truck Series	ThorSport Racing	4	0	2	2	116	35th
2022	NASCAR Camping World Truck Series	Young's Motorsports	1	0	0	0	116	35th
2023	ASA STARS National Tour	Wauters Motorsports	2	0	0	0	84	46th
2023	ASA STARS National Tour	Anthony Campi Racing	1	0	0	0	84	46th
2023	NASCAR Craftsman Truck Series	Roper Racing	3	0	0	0	28	48th
2024	NASCAR Craftsman Truck Series	Niece Motorsports	2	0	0	0	65	35th
2024	NASCAR Craftsman Truck Series	Hattori Racing Enterprises	2	0	0	0	65	35th
2024	NASCAR Craftsman Truck Series	ThorSport Racing	1	0	0	0	65	35th
2025	ASA STARS National Tour	Wauters Motorsports	3	0	0	1	124	27th
2025	NASCAR Craftsman Truck Series	ThorSport Racing	1	0	0	0	29	49th

^{†} As Sauter was a guest driver, he was ineligible for championship points.

=== NASCAR ===
(key) (Bold – Pole position awarded by qualifying time. Italics – Pole position earned by points standings or practice time. * – Most laps led.)

==== Sprint Cup Series ====
NASCAR Sprint Cup Series results
Year	Team	No.	Make	1	2	3	4	5	6	7	8	9	10	11	12	13	14	15	16	17	18	19	20	21	22	23	24	25	26	27	28	29	30	31	32	33	34	35	36	NSCC	Pts	Ref
2003	Morgan-McClure Motorsports	4	Pontiac	DAY	CAR	LVS	ATL	DAR	BRI	TEX	TAL	MAR	CAL	RCH	CLT	DOV	POC	MCH	SON	DAY	CHI; 35	NHA; 23	POC	IND	GLN	MCH	BRI; 25	DAR	RCH; 28	NHA; 32	DOV	TAL	KAN; DNQ	CLT	MAR	ATL	PHO	CAR	HOM	51st	356	
2004	Richard Childress Racing	30	Chevy	DAY; 26	CAR; 14	LVS; 24	ATL; 30	DAR; 26	BRI; 15	TEX; 24	MAR; 31	TAL; 14	CAL; 21	RCH; 19	CLT; 40	DOV; 20	POC	MCH	SON	DAY	CHI	NHA	POC	IND	GLN	MCH	BRI	CAL												36th	1430	
2004	Richard Childress Racing	33	Chevy																										RCH; DNQ	NHA; DNQ	DOV	TAL	KAN							36th	1430	
2004	Phoenix Racing	09	Dodge																															CLT; 24	MAR	ATL; DNQ	PHO; 39	DAR; 29	HOM; DNQ	36th	1430	
2005	Phoenix Racing	09	Dodge	DAY; DNQ	CAL	LVS; DNQ	ATL	BRI; DNQ	MAR; 41	TEX; 41	PHO; 9	TAL; 16	DAR; DNQ	RCH; 41	CLT; 40	DOV	POC	MCH	SON	DAY; 17	CHI	NHA	POC	IND	GLN	MCH	BRI; DNQ	CAL	RCH; 28	NHA	DOV	TAL; DNQ	KAN	CLT; 16	MAR	ATL; DNQ	TEX; DNQ	PHO; 39	HOM	43rd	722	
2006	Haas CNC Racing	70	Chevy	DAY	CAL	LVS	ATL	BRI	MAR	TEX	PHO	TAL	RCH	DAR	CLT; 24	DOV	POC	MCH	SON	DAY	CHI	NHA	POC	IND; DNQ	GLN	MCH	BRI	CAL	RCH	NHA	DOV	KAN	TAL	CLT	MAR	ATL	TEX	PHO	HOM	77th	0	
2007	Haas CNC Racing	70	Chevy	DAY; 16	CAL; 18	LVS; 39	ATL; 29	BRI; DNQ	MAR; 31	TEX; 22	PHO; 9	TAL; 30	RCH; 36	DAR; 29	CLT; 27	DOV; 32	POC; 40	MCH; 26	SON; 31	NHA; 14	DAY; 18	CHI; 22	IND; 37	POC; 36	GLN; 23	MCH; 29	BRI; 42	CAL; 30	RCH; 5	NHA; 28	DOV; 42	KAN; 23	TAL; 12	CLT; 23	MAR; 29	ATL; 32	TEX; 27	PHO; 15	HOM; 41	30th	2875	
2008	Wood Brothers Racing	21	Ford	DAY	CAL	LVS; DNQ	ATL	BRI	MAR	TEX																														53rd	387	
2008	Haas CNC Racing	70	Chevy								PHO; 37	TAL	RCH; 33	DAR; DNQ	CLT; 35	DOV	POC	MCH	SON	NHA; 37	DAY; 28								RCH; 41	NHA; 20								PHO; 37	HOM	53rd	387	
2008	E&M Motorsports	08	Dodge																			CHI; DNQ	IND; DNQ	POC	GLN	MCH; DNQ	BRI; DNQ	CAL; 42			DOV; DNQ	KAN; DNQ	TAL	CLT	MAR	ATL	TEX; DNQ			53rd	387	
2010	Tommy Baldwin Racing	35	Chevy	DAY	CAL; DNQ	LVS	ATL	BRI	MAR; DNQ	PHO; 41																														60th	154	
2010	Tommy Baldwin Racing	36	Chevy								TEX; DNQ	TAL; 41	RCH	DAR	DOV; 43	CLT; 41	POC	MCH; DNQ	SON	NHA	DAY	CHI	IND	POC	GLN	MCH	BRI	ATL	RCH											60th	154	
2010	Prism Motorsports	66	Toyota																											NHA; DNQ	DOV	KAN	CAL		MAR; DNQ	TAL; DNQ	TEX	PHO	HOM	60th	154	
2010	R3 Motorsports	23	Toyota																															CLT; DNQ						60th	154	
2011	Robby Gordon Motorsports	7	Dodge	DAY	PHO	LVS	BRI	CAL	MAR	TEX	TAL	RCH	DAR	DOV	CLT	KAN; 36	POC	MCH	SON	DAY	KEN	NHA	IND	POC	GLN	MCH; DNQ	BRI	ATL	RCH	CHI	NHA	DOV	KAN	CLT	TAL	MAR	TEX	PHO	HOM	73rd	0^{1}	
2013	Phil Parsons Racing	98	Ford	DAY	PHO	LVS	BRI	CAL	MAR	TEX	KAN	RCH	TAL	DAR	CLT	DOV	POC	MCH	SON	KEN	DAY	NHA	IND	POC	GLN	MCH; 42	BRI	ATL	RCH	CHI	NHA; 42	DOV	KAN	CLT	TAL	MAR	TEX	PHO	HOM	77th	0^{1}	
2014	BK Racing	93	Toyota	DAY	PHO	LVS	BRI	CAL	MAR	TEX	DAR	RCH	TAL	KAN	CLT	DOV	POC	MCH	SON	KEN	DAY	NHA	IND	POC; 43	GLN	MCH	BRI	ATL	RCH	CHI	NHA	DOV	KAN	CLT	TAL	MAR	TEX	PHO	HOM	73rd	0^{1}	
2015	BK Racing	83	Toyota	DAY; 19	ATL	LVS	PHO	CAL	MAR	TEX	BRI	RCH	TAL	KAN	CLT	DOV	POC	MCH	SON	DAY	KEN	NHA	IND	POC	GLN	MCH	BRI	DAR	RCH	CHI	NHA	DOV	CLT	KAN	TAL	MAR	TEX	PHO	HOM	61st	0^{1}	

===== Daytona 500 =====
Year	Team	Manufacturer	Start	Finish
2004	Richard Childress Racing	Chevrolet	21	26
2005	Phoenix Racing	Dodge	DNQ	
2007	Haas CNC Racing	Chevrolet	41	16
2015	BK Racing	Toyota	36	19

==== Xfinity Series ====
NASCAR Xfinity Series results
Year	Team	No.	Make	1	2	3	4	5	6	7	8	9	10	11	12	13	14	15	16	17	18	19	20	21	22	23	24	25	26	27	28	29	30	31	32	33	34	35	NXSC	Pts	Ref
2001	Richard Childress Racing	21	Chevy	DAY	CAR	LVS	ATL	DAR	BRI	TEX	NSH	TAL	CAL	RCH	NHA	NZH	CLT	DOV	KEN	MLW	GLN	CHI	GTW	PPR	IRP	MCH	BRI	DAR	RCH; 5	DOV	KAN	CLT	MEM; 13	PHO; 11	CAR; 30	HOM; 35			55th	545	
2002	Richard Childress Racing	2	Chevy	DAY; 17	CAR; 13	LVS; 3	DAR; 11	BRI; 35	TEX; 15	NSH; 23	**TAL**; 33	CAL; 39	RCH; 22	NHA; 21	NZH; 11	CLT	DOV; 40	NSH; 19	KEN; 24	MLW; 12	DAY; 6	CHI; 1	GTW; 11	PPR; 34	IRP; 4	MCH; 22	BRI; 33	DAR; 25	RCH; 36	DOV; 16	KAN; 15	CLT; 37	MEM; 14	ATL; 10	CAR; 20	PHO; 7	HOM; 19		15th	3538	
2003	Curb Racing	43	Chevy	DAY; 9				BRI; 10				CAL; 23	RCH; 6			CLT; 25							NHA; 25			MCH; 22	BRI; 19	DAR; 16	RCH; 1	DOV; 29		CLT; 21		ATL; 16	PHO; 9	CAR; 9			8th	4098	
2003	Curb Racing	43	Dodge		CAR; 9	LVS; 31																																	8th	4098	
2003	Richard Childress Racing	21	Chevy				DAR; 5		TEX; 37	TAL; 26	NSH; 2			GTW; 7	NZH; 10		DOV; 21	NSH; 11	KEN; 17	MLW; 13	DAY; 5	CHI; 27		PPR; 4	IRP; 11						KAN; 34		MEM; 3						8th	4098	
2003	Richard Childress Racing	29	Chevy																																		HOM; 12		8th	4098	
2004	Brewco Motorsports	27	Pontiac	DAY; 2	CAR; 6	LVS; 16	DAR; 27		TEX; 16	NSH; 2		CAL; 24	GTW; 18	RCH; 31	NZH; 22			NSH; 31			DAY; 29				**IRP**; 2								MEM; 8		PHO; 35				18th	3411	
2004	Brewco Motorsports	27	Chevy					BRI; 14			TAL; 31					CLT; 36	DOV; 10		KEN; 25	MLW; 31		CHI; 19	NHA; 27	PPR; 29		MCH; 15	BRI; 32	CAL; 17	RCH; 10	DOV; 5	KAN; 21	CLT; 41		ATL; 43		DAR; 21	HOM; 38		18th	3411	
2005	Phoenix Racing	1	Dodge	DAY; 41	CAL; 24		LVS; 28	ATL; 20	NSH; 16	BRI; 18	TEX; 43	PHO; 26	TAL; 41	DAR; 17	RCH; 3	CLT; 18	DOV; 35	NSH; 9	KEN; 38	**MLW**; 1*	DAY; 16	CHI; 27	NHA; 18	PPR; 32	GTW; 7	IRP; 9	GLN; 43	MCH; 10	BRI; 5	CAL; 4	RCH; 12	DOV; 39	KAN; 3	CLT; 42	MEM; 9	TEX; 10	PHO; 11	HOM; 11	12th	3695	
2005	Phoenix Racing	28	Dodge			MXC; 11																																	12th	3695	
2006	Haas CNC Racing	00	Chevy	DAY; 35	CAL; 13	MXC; 6	LVS; 15	ATL; 12	BRI; 10	TEX; 14	NSH; 27	PHO; 36	TAL; 8	RCH; 11	DAR; 34	CLT; 11	DOV; 21	NSH; 14	KEN; 32	MLW; 9	DAY; 21	CHI; 17	NHA; 6	MAR; 5	GTW; 18	IRP; 42	GLN; 19	MCH; 35	BRI; 11	CAL; 31	RCH; 15	DOV; 24	KAN; 35	CLT; 6	**MEM**; 4	TEX; 35	PHO; 11	HOM; 10	8th	3794	
2007	Jay Robinson Racing	28	Chevy	DAY	CAL	MXC	LVS	ATL; 30	BRI; 23		TEX; 23	PHO; 38	TAL	RCH	DAR	CLT; 36	DOV	NSH	KEN	MLW	NHA	DAY	CHI	GTW	IRP	CGV	GLN	MCH					KAN; 32	CLT	MEM	TEX	PHO	HOM	66th	587	
2007	Brewco Motorsports	37	Ford							NSH; 35																													66th	587	
2007	Brewco Motorsports	27	Ford																										BRI; 22	CAL	RCH	DOV							66th	587	
2008	Phoenix Racing	1	Chevy	DAY; 13	CAL; 21	LVS; 16	ATL; 26	BRI; 21	NSH	TEX	PHO	MXC																											54th	752	
2008	Bob Schacht Motorsports	75	Chevy										TAL; 42																										54th	752	
2008	Fitz Motorsports	22	Dodge											RCH; 24	DAR	CLT	DOV	NSH	KEN	MLW	NHA	DAY	CHI	GTW	IRP	CGV	GLN												54th	752	
2008	Curb-Agajanian Performance Group	98	Chevy																									MCH; 42	BRI; 42										54th	752	
2008	CFK Motorsports	78	Chevy																											CAL; 42	RCH								54th	752	
2008	CFK Motorsports	78	Dodge																													DOV; 40	KAN	CLT; DNQ	MEM; 41	TEX; DNQ	PHO	HOM	54th	752	
2009	Joe Gibbs Racing	18	Toyota	DAY	CAL	LVS	BRI	TEX	NSH	PHO	TAL	RCH	DAR	CLT	DOV	NSH	KEN	MLW; QL^{†}	NHA	DAY	CHI	GTW	IRP; QL^{†}	IOW	GLN	MCH	BRI	CGV	ATL	RCH	DOV	KAN	CAL	CLT	MEM	TEX	PHO	HOM	N/A	—	
2010	Blanton Motorsports	48	Chevy	DAY; 38	CAL	LVS	BRI																																75th	419	
2010	Curb Racing	27	Ford					NSH; 13															IRP; 25	IOW	GLN	MCH	BRI	CGV	ATL	RCH	DOV	KAN	CAL	CLT	GTW	TEX	PHO	HOM	75th	419	
2010	R3 Motorsports	23	Chevy						PHO; 15	TEX	TAL	RCH	DAR	DOV	CLT	NSH	KEN	ROA	NHA	DAY	CHI																		75th	419	
2010	Front Row Motorsports	36	Chevy																			GTW; 36																	75th	419	
2012	NEMCO Motorsports	97	Toyota	DAY; 42	PHO	LVS	BRI	CAL	TEX	RCH	TAL	DAR	IOW	CLT	DOV	MCH	ROA	KEN	DAY	NHA	CHI	IND	IOW	GLN	CGV	BRI	ATL	RCH	CHI	KEN	DOV	CLT	KAN	TEX	PHO	HOM			143rd	0^{1}	
2014	Hattori Racing Enterprises	80	Toyota	DAY; 28	PHO	LVS	BRI	CAL	TEX	DAR	RCH	TAL	IOW	CLT; 16	DOV	MCH	ROA	KEN	DAY; 15	NHA	CHI	IND	IOW	GLN	MOH	BRI	ATL	RCH	CHI	KEN	DOV	KAN	CLT	TEX	PHO	HOM			102nd	0^{1}	
2018	GMS Racing	23	Chevy	DAY	ATL	LVS	PHO	CAL	TEX	BRI	RCH	TAL	DOV; 6	CLT	POC	MCH	IOW	CHI	DAY	KEN	NHA; 19	IOW	GLN	MOH	BRI	ROA	DAR	IND	LVS	RCH	ROV	DOV	KAN	TEX	PHO	HOM			99th	0^{1}	
^{†} – Qualified for Kyle Busch

==== Craftsman Truck Series ====
NASCAR Craftsman Truck Series results
Year	Team	No.	Make	1	2	3	4	5	6	7	8	9	10	11	12	13	14	15	16	17	18	19	20	21	22	23	24	25	NCTC	Pts	Ref
2003	Fasscore Motorsports	9	Ford	DAY	DAR	MMR	MAR	CLT	DOV	TEX	MEM	MLW	KAN	KEN	GTW	MCH	IRP	NSH	BRI; 25	RCH; 10	NHA	CAL	LVS	SBO	TEX	MAR	PHO	HOM; 33	69th	286	
2004	Curb-Agajanian Performance Group	43	Chevy	DAY	ATL	MAR; DNQ	MFD	CLT	DOV	TEX	MEM	MLW	KAN	KEN	GTW	MCH	IRP; 2*	NSH	BRI	RCH; 11	NHA	LVS	CAL	TEX	MAR	PHO	DAR	HOM	54th	310	
2005	Billy Ballew Motorsports	15	Chevy	DAY	CAL	ATL	MAR	GTW	MFD	CLT	DOV	TEX; 11	MCH	MLW	KAN	KEN	MEM												59th	288	
2005	Curb Racing	43	Chevy															IRP; DNQ	NSH	BRI	RCH; 36	NHA	LVS	MAR	ATL	TEX	PHO		59th	288	
2005	ThorSport Racing	13	Chevy																									HOM; 20	59th	288	
2006	Sutton Motorsports	02	Chevy	DAY	CAL	ATL	MAR; 22	GTW	CLT	MFD	DOV	TEX	MCH																57th	224	
2006	Billy Ballew Motorsports	51	Chevy											MLW; 12	KAN	KEN	MEM	IRP	NSH	BRI	NHA	LVS	TAL	MAR	ATL	TEX	PHO	HOM	57th	224	
2008	SS-Green Light Racing	07	Chevy	DAY	CAL	ATL	MAR	KAN	CLT	MFD	DOV	TEX	MCH	MLW	MEM	KEN	IRP	NSH	BRI	GTW	NHA	LVS	TAL	MAR; 23	ATL	TEX	PHO	HOM	87th	94	
2009	ThorSport Racing	13	Chevy	DAY; 27	CAL; 17	ATL; 18	MAR; 27	KAN; 9	CLT; 13	DOV; 5	**TEX**; 6	MCH; 16	MLW; 14	MEM; 8	KEN; 22	IRP; 14	NSH; 6	BRI; 18	CHI; 5	IOW; 5	GTW; 2	NHA; 5	LVS; 1*	MAR; 16	TAL; 14	TEX; 6	**PHO**; 5	HOM; 9	6th	3331	
2010	ThorSport Racing	13	Chevy	DAY; 35	ATL; 8	MAR; 15	NSH; 11	KAN; 1*	DOV; 15	CLT; 12	TEX; 2	MCH; 14	IOW; 2	GTW; 3	IRP; 4	POC; 14	NSH; 5	DAR; 4	BRI; 11	CHI; 4	KEN; 2	NHA; 7	LVS; 2	MAR; 21	TAL; 3	TEX; 2	PHO; 3	HOM; 3	3rd	3676	
2011	ThorSport Racing	13	Chevy	DAY; 17	PHO; 4	DAR; 9	**MAR**; 1	NSH; 7	DOV; 11	CLT; 6	KAN; 2	TEX; 22	**KEN**; 24	IOW; 4	NSH; 2	IRP; 23	POC; 4	MCH; 13	BRI; 2	ATL; 29	CHI; 6	NHA; 5	KEN; 14	LVS; 4	TAL; 15	MAR; 4	TEX; 7	HOM; 1	2nd	882	
2012	ThorSport Racing	13	Toyota	DAY; 24	MAR; 29	CAR; 4	KAN; 24	CLT; 25	DOV; 24	TEX; 1	KEN; 6	IOW; 4	CHI; 22	POC; 27	MCH; 11	BRI; 11	ATL; 12	IOW; 4	KEN; 6	LVS; 21	TAL; 2	MAR; 14	TEX; 1	PHO; 25	HOM; 6				9th	678	
2013	ThorSport Racing	98	Toyota	DAY; 1	MAR; 1	CAR; 4	KAN; 5	CLT; 28	DOV; 7	**TEX**; 7	KEN; 12	IOW; 11	ELD; 29	POC; 19	MCH; 20	BRI; 4	MSP; 28	IOW; 4	CHI; 10	LVS; 2	TAL; 1	MAR; 8	TEX; 2	PHO; 8	HOM; 16				4th	732	
2014	ThorSport Racing	98	Toyota	DAY; 3	MAR; 4	KAN; 21	CLT; 6	DOV; 3	TEX; 7	GTW; 4	KEN; 9	IOW; 18	ELD; 8	POC; 2	MCH; 1	BRI; 5	MSP; 8	CHI; 14	NHA; 4	LVS; 14	TAL; 31	MAR; 7	TEX; 16	PHO; 9	HOM; 10				4th	773	
2015	ThorSport Racing	98	Toyota	DAY; 10	ATL; 6	MAR; 4	KAN; 3	CLT; 15	DOV; 9	TEX; 4	GTW; 3	IOW; 17	KEN; 12	ELD; 22	POC; 6	MCH; 4	BRI; 9	MSP; 6	CHI; 5*	NHA; 3	LVS; 12	TAL; 7	MAR; 9	TEX; 13	PHO; 25	HOM; 7			4th	809	
2016	GMS Racing	21	Chevy	DAY; 1	ATL; 28	MAR; 32	KAN; 16	DOV; 4	CLT; 3	**TEX**; 3	IOW; 10	GTW; 4	KEN; 5	ELD; 13	POC; 8	BRI; 5	MCH; 9	MSP; 7	CHI; 5	NHA; 10	LVS; 7	TAL; 7	MAR; 1	TEX; 1	PHO; 2	HOM; 3			1st	4030	
2017	GMS Racing	21	Chevy	DAY; 15*	ATL; 3	MAR; 2	KAN; 2	CLT; 2	DOV; 1	TEX; 8	GTW; 3	IOW; 2	KEN; 9	ELD; 23	POC; 5	MCH; 18	BRI; 6	MSP; 6	CHI; 1	NHA; 9	LVS; 10	TAL; 12*	MAR; 3	TEX; 1	PHO; 1	HOM; 3			2nd	4034	
2018	GMS Racing	21	Chevy	DAY; 1*	ATL; 3	LVS; 2	MAR; 19	DOV; 1*	KAN; 5	CLT; 1*	TEX; 1	IOW; 5	GTW; 3	CHI; 3	KEN; 15	ELD; 16	POC; 8	MCH; 2	BRI; 1	MSP; 6	LVS; 2	TAL; 22	MAR; 1*	**TEX**; 11	PHO; 7	HOM; 12			4th	4025	
2019	ThorSport Racing	13	Ford	DAY; 23	ATL; 2	LVS; 8	MAR; 9	TEX; 3	DOV; 1	KAN; 22	CLT; 17	TEX; 13	IOW; 27	GTW	CHI; 18	KEN; 10	POC; 8	ELD; 21	MCH; 12	BRI; 11	MSP; 6	LVS; 29	TAL; 14*	MAR; 3	PHO; 8	HOM; 6			6th	2238	
2020	ThorSport Racing	13	Ford	DAY; 7	**LVS**; 2	CLT; 7	ATL; 40	HOM; 5	POC; 13	KEN; 4	TEX; 33	KAN; 9	KAN; 33	MCH; 16	DRC; 21	DOV; 6	GTW; 33	DAR; 31	RCH; 27	BRI; 9	LVS; 11	TAL; 11	KAN; 18	TEX; 23	MAR; 23	PHO; 11			13th	523	
2021	ThorSport Racing	13	Toyota	**DAY**; 27	DRC; 18	LVS; 15	ATL; 4	BRD; 32	RCH; 5	KAN; 9	DAR; 6	COA; 22	CLT; 31	TEX; 12	NSH; 12	POC; 35	KNX; 20	GLN; 23	GTW; 5	DAR; 8	BRI; 5	LVS; 4	TAL; 30	MAR; 31	PHO; 11				12th	505	
2022	G2G Racing	47	Toyota	DAY; 34	LVS	ATL	COA																						35th	116	
2022	ThorSport Racing	13	Toyota					MAR; 2	BRD	DAR	KAN	TEX	CLT	GTW; 5	SON	KNX	NSH	MOH	POC	IRP; 12	RCH	KAN	BRI	TAL; 25	HOM				35th	116	
2022	Young's Motorsports	02	Chevy																							PHO; 28			35th	116	
2023	Roper Racing	04	Ford	DAY	LVS	ATL	COA	TEX	BRD	MAR	KAN; 19	DAR; 28	NWS; 36	CLT; Wth	GTW	NSH	MOH	POC	RCH	IRP	MLW	KAN	BRI	TAL	HOM	PHO			48th	28	
2024	Niece Motorsports	45	Chevy	DAY; 29	ATL	LVS	BRI	COA	MAR	TEX; 17	KAN	DAR	NWS	CLT	GTW	NSH	POC												39th	65	
2024	Hattori Racing Enterprises	16	Toyota															IRP; 23	RCH	MLW	BRI	KAN	TAL; 34	HOM					39th	65	
2024	ThorSport Racing	66	Ford																						MAR; 28	PHO			39th	65	
2025	ThorSport Racing	66	Ford	DAY; 17	ATL	LVS	HOM	MAR	BRI	CAR	TEX	KAN	NWS	CLT	NSH	MCH	POC	LRP	IRP	GLN	RCH	DAR	BRI	NHA	ROV	TAL	MAR	PHO	49th	29	

^{*} Season still in progress
^{1} Ineligible for series points

=== ARCA Re/Max Series ===
(key) (Bold – Pole position awarded by qualifying time. Italics – Pole position earned by points standings or practice time. * – Most laps led. ** – All laps led.)

ARCA Re/Max Series results
Year	Team	No.	Make	1	2	3	4	5	6	7	8	9	10	11	12	13	14	15	16	17	18	19	20	21	22	23	24	25	ARMSC	Pts	Ref
2001	Cavin Councilor	19	Chevy	DAY	NSH	WIN	SLM	GTY	KEN	CLT	KAN	MCH	POC	MEM	GLN	KEN	MCH	POC	NSH	ISF	CHI	DSF	SLM	TOL	BLN	CLT; 8	TAL	ATL	121st	190	
2002	Richard Childress Racing	2	Chevy	DAY	ATL	NSH; Wth	SLM	KEN	CLT	KAN	POC	MCH	TOL	SBO	KEN	BLN	POC	NSH	ISF	WIN	DSF	CHI	SLM	TAL	CLT				N/A	0	
2007	Country Joe Racing	32	Dodge	DAY	USA	NSH	SLM	KAN	WIN	KEN	TOL	IOW	POC; 21	MCH	BLN	KEN	POC	NSH	ISF	MIL	GTW	DSF	CHI	SLM	TAL	TOL			139th	125	

=== ASA STARS National Tour ===
(key) (Bold – Pole position awarded by qualifying time. Italics – Pole position earned by points standings or practice time. * – Most laps led. ** – All laps led.)

ASA STARS National Tour results
Year	Team	No.	Make	1	2	3	4	5	6	7	8	9	10	11	12	ASNTC	Pts	Ref
2023	Wauters Motorsports	5JS	Chevy	FIF	MAD; 21											46th	84	
2023	Wauters Motorsports	5	Toyota			NWS; DNQ	HCY	MLW	AND							46th	84	
2023	Anthony Campi Racing	18JS	Chevy							WIR; 25	TOL	WIN				46th	84	
2023	Wauters Motorsports	5S	Chevy										NSV; 33			46th	84	
2024	Wauters Motorsports	5	Chevy	NSM; DNQ	FIF	HCY	MAD	MLW	AND	OWO	TOL	WIN	NSV			97th	20	
2025	Wauters Motorsports	5	Chevy	NSM; DNQ	FIF; 22	DOM; 19	HCY	NPS	MAD	SLG	AND					27th	124	
2025	Wauters Motorsports	5J	Chevy									OWO; 6	TOL	WIN	NSV	27th	124	

Sporting positions
Preceded by Gary St. Amant	ASA National Tour Champion; 2001	Succeeded by Joey Clanton
Awards and achievements
Preceded by Colin Braun	NASCAR Camping World Truck Series Rookie of the Year; 2009	Succeeded by Austin Dillon
Preceded by Erik Jones	NASCAR Camping World Truck Series Champion; 2016	Succeeded by Christopher Bell
