= The World's Number One, Flat-Out, All-Time Great Stock Car Racing Book =

1975 American book

- First edition
- Author: Jerry Bledsoe
- Language: English
- Genre: Auto Racing
- Publisher: Down Home Press
- Publication date: 1975 (1st Edition) 1995 (20th Anniversary Edition)
- Media type: Paperback (Anniversary Edition)
- Pages: 335 (Anniversary Edition)
- ISBN: 1-878086-36-7
- OCLC: 32471682

The World's Number One, Flat-Out, All-Time Great Stock Car Racing Book is a non-fiction book on early stock car racing published in 1975 by Doubleday.

The book revolves around the 1972 Southern 500 weekend at Darlington Raceway in Darlington, SC, with historical pieces and driver interviews in between.

In the 20th Anniversary Edition introduction, Bledsoe notes that the first edition barely sold enough to cover the publishing and marketing costs. "Well, it was well received by critics," Bledsoe states, "several of whom said it lived up to its title. A couple called it a classic work on the subject, and to be a classic, it has to stay around, right?" Bledsoe put out the anniversary edition in 1995, published by Down Home Press.

The book features drivers Ethel Flock, Tim Flock, Friday Hassler, Junior Johnson, David Pearson, Richard Petty, Billy Scott, Wendell Scott and Larry Smith, as well as Bill Frazier, Richard Howard and Ken Squier.

== Reception ==
- The Central New Jersey Home News (New Brunswick, NJ), Feb 18, 1975: "Jerry Bledsoe has tried to capture some of the fascination of NASCAR racing in his book... There is a lot of Wolfe's 'new journalism' style in this book, but not enough to erase Bledsoe's obvious talents for seeing inside the people he is writing about and transferring their words to print."
- The High Point Enterprise (High Point, NC), Feb 23, 1975: "Bledsoe has written about stock car racing from its beginning to where it is today. He tells this story not in a single, chronological narrative, but through glimpses of people involved in stock car racing."
- St. Louis Post Dispatch (St. Louis, MO), March 16, 1975: "Bledsoe sees a unique slice of American culture amid the STP decals and oversize Goodyear racing tires."
- Tallahassee Democrat (Tallahassee, FL), June 23, 1967: "The reader is treated to views of down-home, rough-and-ready, half-mile, dirt-track racing, as well as the expensive and sophisticated Grand National division."
