= 2005 Sharpie 500 =

Race details
- Race 24 of 36 in the 2005 NASCAR Nextel Cup Series
- The 2005 Sharpie 500 program cover, featuring Rusty Wallace. Artwork done by Sam Bass. The painting is called "Final Round!"
- Date: August 27, 2005
- Official name: 45th Annual Sharpie 500
- Location: Bristol, Tennessee, Bristol Motor Speedway
- Course: Permanent racing facility
- Course length: 0.533 miles (0.858 km)
- Distance: 500 laps, 266.5 mi (428.89 km)
- Scheduled distance: 500 laps, 266.5 mi (428.89 km)
- Average speed: 84.678 miles per hour (136.276 km/h)
- Attendance: 160,000

Pole position
Driver	Matt Kenseth	Roush Racing
- Time: 15.073

Most laps led
Driver	Matt Kenseth	Roush Racing
- Laps: 415

Winner
No. 17	Matt Kenseth	Roush Racing

Television in the United States
- Network: TNT
- Announcers: Bill Weber, Benny Parsons, Wally Dallenbach Jr.

Radio in the United States
- Radio: Performance Racing Network

The 2005 Sharpie 500 was the 24th stock car race of the 2005 NASCAR Nextel Cup Series season and the 45th iteration of the event. The race was held on Saturday, August 27, 2005, before a crowd of 160,000 in Bristol, Tennessee at Bristol Motor Speedway, a 0.533 miles (0.858 km) permanent oval-shaped racetrack. The race took the scheduled 500 laps to complete. At race's end, Matt Kenseth of Roush Racing would dominate the race to win his 10th career NASCAR Nextel Cup Series win and his first and only win of the season. To fill out the podium, Jeff Burton of Richard Childress Racing and Greg Biffle of Roush Racing would finish second and third, respectively.

== Background ==
The layout of Bristol Motor Speedway, the venue where the race was held.

The Bristol Motor Speedway, formerly known as Bristol International Raceway and Bristol Raceway, is a NASCAR short track venue located in Bristol, Tennessee. Constructed in 1960, it held its first NASCAR race on July 30, 1961. Despite its short length, Bristol is among the most popular tracks on the NASCAR schedule because of its distinct features, which include extraordinarily steep banking, an all concrete surface, two pit roads, and stadium-like seating. It has also been named one of the loudest NASCAR tracks.

=== Entry list ===
#	Driver	Team	Make
0	Mike Bliss	Haas CNC Racing	Chevrolet
00	Johnny Benson Jr.	Michael Waltrip Racing	Chevrolet
01	Joe Nemechek	MB2 Motorsports	Chevrolet
2	Rusty Wallace	Penske Racing	Dodge
4	Mike Wallace	Morgan–McClure Motorsports	Chevrolet
5	Kyle Busch	Hendrick Motorsports	Chevrolet
6	Mark Martin	Roush Racing	Ford
7	Robby Gordon	Robby Gordon Motorsports	Chevrolet
07	Dave Blaney	Richard Childress Racing	Chevrolet
8	Dale Earnhardt Jr.	Dale Earnhardt, Inc.	Chevrolet
9	Kasey Kahne	Evernham Motorsports	Dodge
09	Johnny Sauter	Phoenix Racing	Dodge
10	Scott Riggs	MBV Motorsports	Chevrolet
11	Terry Labonte	Joe Gibbs Racing	Chevrolet
12	Ryan Newman	Penske Racing	Dodge
15	Michael Waltrip	Dale Earnhardt, Inc.	Chevrolet
16	Greg Biffle	Roush Racing	Ford
17	Matt Kenseth	Roush Racing	Ford
18	Bobby Labonte	Joe Gibbs Racing	Chevrolet
19	Jeremy Mayfield	Evernham Motorsports	Dodge
20	Tony Stewart	Joe Gibbs Racing	Chevrolet
21	Ricky Rudd	Wood Brothers Racing	Ford
22	Scott Wimmer	Bill Davis Racing	Dodge
24	Jeff Gordon	Hendrick Motorsports	Chevrolet
25	Brian Vickers	Hendrick Motorsports	Chevrolet
29	Kevin Harvick	Richard Childress Racing	Chevrolet
31	Jeff Burton	Richard Childress Racing	Chevrolet
32	Bobby Hamilton Jr.	PPI Motorsports	Chevrolet
34	P. J. Jones	Mach 1 Motorsports	Chevrolet
37	Tony Raines	R&J Racing	Dodge
38	Elliott Sadler	Robert Yates Racing	Ford
40	Sterling Marlin	Chip Ganassi Racing with Felix Sabates	Dodge
41	Casey Mears	Chip Ganassi Racing with Felix Sabates	Dodge
42	Jamie McMurray	Chip Ganassi Racing with Felix Sabates	Dodge
43	Jeff Green	Petty Enterprises	Dodge
45	Kyle Petty	Petty Enterprises	Dodge
48	Jimmie Johnson	Hendrick Motorsports	Chevrolet
49	Ken Schrader	BAM Racing	Dodge
50	Jimmy Spencer	Arnold Motorsports	Dodge
66	Mike Garvey	Peak Fitness Racing	Ford
75	Wayne Anderson	Rinaldi Racing	Dodge
77	Travis Kvapil	Penske Racing	Dodge
80	Carl Long	McGlynn Racing	Chevrolet
88	Dale Jarrett	Robert Yates Racing	Ford
89	Morgan Shepherd	Shepherd Racing Ventures	Dodge
92	Hermie Sadler	Front Row Motorsports	Chevrolet
95	Stanton Barrett	Stanton Barrett Motorsports	Chevrolet
97	Kurt Busch	Roush Racing	Ford
99	Carl Edwards	Roush Racing	Ford
Official entry list

== Practice ==
The first and only two-hour practice session would occur on Friday, August 26, at 12:00 PM EST. Greg Biffle of Roush Racing would set the fastest time in the session, with a lap of 15.247 and an average speed of 125.848 miles per hour (202.533 km/h).

Pos.	#	Driver	Team	Make	Time	Speed
1	16	Greg Biffle	Roush Racing	Ford	15.247	125.848
2	5	Kyle Busch	Hendrick Motorsports	Chevrolet	15.283	125.551
3	10	Scott Riggs	MBV Motorsports	Chevrolet	15.332	125.150
Full practice results

== Qualifying ==
Qualifying was held on Friday, August 26, at 6:10 PM EST. Each driver would have two laps to set a fastest time; the fastest of the two would count as their official qualifying lap.

Matt Kenseth of Roush Racing would win the pole, setting a time of 15.073 and an average speed of 127.300 miles per hour (204.869 km/h).

6 drivers would fail to qualify: Wayne Anderson, Mike Garvey, Johnny Sauter, Morgan Shepherd, P. J. Jones, and Tony Raines.

=== Full qualifying results ===
Pos.	#	Driver	Team	Make	Time	Speed
1	17	Matt Kenseth	Roush Racing	Ford	15.073	127.300
2	24	Jeff Gordon	Hendrick Motorsports	Chevrolet	15.085	127.199
3	07	Dave Blaney	Richard Childress Racing	Chevrolet	15.090	127.157
4	16	Greg Biffle	Roush Racing	Ford	15.107	127.014
5	21	Ricky Rudd	Wood Brothers Racing	Ford	15.111	126.980
6	12	Ryan Newman	Penske Racing	Dodge	15.114	126.955
7	49	Ken Schrader	BAM Racing	Dodge	15.114	126.955
8	32	Bobby Hamilton Jr.	PPI Motorsports	Chevrolet	15.122	126.888
9	38	Elliott Sadler	Robert Yates Racing	Ford	15.140	126.737
10	9	Kasey Kahne	Evernham Motorsports	Dodge	15.158	126.587
11	5	Kyle Busch	Hendrick Motorsports	Chevrolet	15.160	126.570
12	10	Scott Riggs	MBV Motorsports	Chevrolet	15.188	126.337
13	97	Kurt Busch	Roush Racing	Ford	15.202	126.220
14	41	Casey Mears	Chip Ganassi Racing with Felix Sabates	Dodge	15.210	126.154
15	4	Mike Wallace	Morgan–McClure Motorsports	Chevrolet	15.213	126.129
16	19	Jeremy Mayfield	Evernham Motorsports	Dodge	15.215	126.112
17	20	Tony Stewart	Joe Gibbs Racing	Chevrolet	15.225	126.030
18	42	Jamie McMurray	Chip Ganassi Racing with Felix Sabates	Dodge	15.241	125.897
19	29	Kevin Harvick	Richard Childress Racing	Chevrolet	15.248	125.840
20	2	Rusty Wallace	Penske Racing	Dodge	15.250	125.823
21	00	Johnny Benson Jr.	Michael Waltrip Racing	Chevrolet	15.253	125.798
22	15	Michael Waltrip	Dale Earnhardt, Inc.	Chevrolet	15.266	125.691
23	25	Brian Vickers	Hendrick Motorsports	Chevrolet	15.277	125.601
24	31	Jeff Burton	Richard Childress Racing	Chevrolet	15.280	125.576
25	6	Mark Martin	Roush Racing	Ford	15.287	125.518
26	45	Kyle Petty	Petty Enterprises	Dodge	15.303	125.387
27	0	Mike Bliss	Haas CNC Racing	Chevrolet	15.304	125.379
28	43	Jeff Green	Petty Enterprises	Dodge	15.312	125.313
29	48	Jimmie Johnson	Hendrick Motorsports	Chevrolet	15.313	125.305
30	88	Dale Jarrett	Robert Yates Racing	Ford	15.316	125.281
31	77	Travis Kvapil	Penske Racing	Dodge	15.328	125.183
32	22	Scott Wimmer	Bill Davis Racing	Dodge	15.332	125.150
33	7	Robby Gordon	Robby Gordon Motorsports	Chevrolet	15.351	124.995
34	50	Jimmy Spencer	Arnold Motorsports	Dodge	15.356	124.954
35	01	Joe Nemechek	MB2 Motorsports	Chevrolet	15.369	124.849
36	95	Stanton Barrett	Stanton Barrett Motorsports	Chevrolet	15.389	124.687
37	99	Carl Edwards	Roush Racing	Ford	15.399	124.605
38	92	Hermie Sadler	Front Row Motorsports	Chevrolet	15.472	124.018
39	11	Terry Labonte	Joe Gibbs Racing	Chevrolet	15.481	123.946
40	40	Sterling Marlin	Chip Ganassi Racing with Felix Sabates	Dodge	15.496	123.826
Qualified by owner's points
41	8	Dale Earnhardt Jr.	Dale Earnhardt, Inc.	Chevrolet	15.532	123.538
42	18	Bobby Labonte	Joe Gibbs Racing	Chevrolet	15.554	123.364
Last car to make it on time
43	80	Carl Long	McGlynn Racing	Chevrolet	15.484	123.922
Failed to qualify
44	75	Wayne Anderson	Rinaldi Racing	Dodge	15.523	123.610
45	66	Mike Garvey	Peak Fitness Racing	Ford	15.558	123.332
46	09	Johnny Sauter	Phoenix Racing	Dodge	15.574	123.205
47	89	Morgan Shepherd	Shepherd Racing Ventures	Dodge	15.678	122.388
48	34	P. J. Jones	Mach 1 Motorsports	Chevrolet	15.683	122.349
49	37	Tony Raines	R&J Racing	Dodge	15.688	122.310
Official qualifying results

== Race results ==
Fin	St	#	Driver	Team	Make	Laps	Led	Status	Pts	Winnings
1	1	17	Matt Kenseth	Roush Racing	Ford	500	415	running	190	$360,536
2	24	31	Jeff Burton	Richard Childress Racing	Chevrolet	500	0	running	170	$219,895
3	4	16	Greg Biffle	Roush Racing	Ford	500	1	running	170	$168,225
4	5	21	Ricky Rudd	Wood Brothers Racing	Ford	500	0	running	160	$156,514
5	20	2	Rusty Wallace	Penske Racing	Dodge	500	9	running	160	$154,733
6	2	24	Jeff Gordon	Hendrick Motorsports	Chevrolet	500	27	running	155	$155,886
7	27	0	Mike Bliss	Haas CNC Racing	Chevrolet	500	4	running	151	$106,650
8	17	20	Tony Stewart	Joe Gibbs Racing	Chevrolet	500	0	running	142	$146,086
9	41	8	Dale Earnhardt Jr.	Dale Earnhardt, Inc.	Chevrolet	500	0	running	138	$144,333
10	13	97	Kurt Busch	Roush Racing	Ford	500	0	running	134	$148,625
11	7	49	Ken Schrader	BAM Racing	Dodge	500	0	running	130	$96,000
12	35	01	Joe Nemechek	MB2 Motorsports	Chevrolet	500	0	running	127	$126,558
13	9	38	Elliott Sadler	Robert Yates Racing	Ford	500	2	running	129	$131,291
14	32	22	Scott Wimmer	Bill Davis Racing	Dodge	500	0	running	121	$119,133
15	22	15	Michael Waltrip	Dale Earnhardt, Inc.	Chevrolet	500	0	running	118	$121,139
16	25	6	Mark Martin	Roush Racing	Ford	500	0	running	115	$107,025
17	15	4	Mike Wallace	Morgan–McClure Motorsports	Chevrolet	500	0	running	112	$91,675
18	16	19	Jeremy Mayfield	Evernham Motorsports	Dodge	500	18	running	114	$117,345
19	31	77	Travis Kvapil	Penske Racing	Dodge	500	0	running	106	$99,875
20	23	25	Brian Vickers	Hendrick Motorsports	Chevrolet	500	0	running	103	$99,775
21	42	18	Bobby Labonte	Joe Gibbs Racing	Chevrolet	500	21	running	105	$123,550
22	28	43	Jeff Green	Petty Enterprises	Dodge	500	0	running	97	$117,261
23	3	07	Dave Blaney	Richard Childress Racing	Chevrolet	500	0	running	94	$96,900
24	37	99	Carl Edwards	Roush Racing	Ford	499	0	running	91	$101,875
25	26	45	Kyle Petty	Petty Enterprises	Dodge	499	0	running	88	$101,008
26	18	42	Jamie McMurray	Chip Ganassi Racing with Felix Sabates	Dodge	498	0	running	85	$93,415
27	39	11	Terry Labonte	Joe Gibbs Racing	Chevrolet	497	0	running	82	$84,905
28	34	50	Jimmy Spencer	Arnold Motorsports	Dodge	493	0	running	79	$81,395
29	40	40	Sterling Marlin	Chip Ganassi Racing with Felix Sabates	Dodge	491	0	running	76	$111,693
30	38	92	Hermie Sadler	Front Row Motorsports	Chevrolet	491	0	running	73	$81,675
31	30	88	Dale Jarrett	Robert Yates Racing	Ford	478	0	running	70	$115,223
32	43	80	Carl Long	McGlynn Racing	Chevrolet	472	0	running	67	$80,955
33	11	5	Kyle Busch	Hendrick Motorsports	Chevrolet	448	0	running	64	$89,795
34	14	41	Casey Mears	Chip Ganassi Racing with Felix Sabates	Dodge	427	0	running	61	$100,393
35	8	32	Bobby Hamilton Jr.	PPI Motorsports	Chevrolet	411	0	running	58	$90,172
36	29	48	Jimmie Johnson	Hendrick Motorsports	Chevrolet	410	0	engine	55	$128,956
37	19	29	Kevin Harvick	Richard Childress Racing	Chevrolet	352	3	crash	57	$127,316
38	33	7	Robby Gordon	Robby Gordon Motorsports	Chevrolet	332	0	oil leak	49	$80,270
39	6	12	Ryan Newman	Penske Racing	Dodge	317	0	crash	46	$125,151
40	12	10	Scott Riggs	MBV Motorsports	Chevrolet	309	0	engine	43	$88,050
41	36	95	Stanton Barrett	Stanton Barrett Motorsports	Chevrolet	251	0	engine	40	$79,900
42	10	9	Kasey Kahne	Evernham Motorsports	Dodge	212	0	crash	37	$111,840
43	21	00	Johnny Benson Jr.	Michael Waltrip Racing	Chevrolet	78	0	electrical	34	$79,962

Previous race: 2005 GFS Marketplace 400	NASCAR Nextel Cup Series; 2005 season	Next race: 2005 Sony HD 500
