= 2005 Chevy Rock & Roll 400 =

Race details
- Race 26 of 36 in the 2005 NASCAR Nextel Cup Series
- The 2005 Chevy Rock & Roll 400 program cover.
- Date: September 10, 2005
- Official name: 48th Annual Chevy Rock & Roll 400
- Location: Richmond, Virginia, Richmond International Raceway
- Course: Permanent racing facility
- Course length: 0.75 miles (1.21 km)
- Distance: 400 laps, 300 mi (482.803 km)
- Scheduled distance: 400 laps, 300 mi (482.803 km)
- Average speed: 98.567 miles per hour (158.628 km/h)
- Attendance: 107,000

Pole position
Driver	Kevin Harvick	Richard Childress Racing
- Time: 21.024

Most laps led
Driver	Kurt Busch	Roush Racing
- Laps: 185

Winner
No. 97	Kurt Busch	Roush Racing

Television in the United States
- Network: TNT
- Announcers: Bill Weber, Benny Parsons, Wally Dallenbach Jr.

Radio in the United States
- Radio: Motor Racing Network

The 2005 Chevy Rock & Roll 400 was the 26th stock car race of the 2005 NASCAR Nextel Cup Series season, the final race of the regular season, and the 48th iteration of the event. The race was held on Saturday, September 10, 2005, before a sold-out crowd of 107,000 in Richmond, Virginia, at Richmond International Raceway, a 0.75 miles (1.21 km) D-shaped oval. The race took the scheduled 400 laps to complete. At race's end, Kurt Busch of Roush Racing would take control of the race in the late stages of the race to win his 14th career NASCAR Nextel Cup Series win and his third and final win of the season. To fill out the podium, Busch's teammates, Matt Kenseth and Greg Biffle would finish second and third, respectively.

The ten drivers who would make the second edition of the Chase for the Nextel Cup were Tony Stewart, Greg Biffle, Rusty Wallace, Jimmie Johnson, Kurt Busch, Mark Martin, Jeremy Mayfield, Carl Edwards, Matt Kenseth, and Ryan Newman.

== Background ==
The layout of Richmond International Raceway, the venue where the race was at.

Richmond International Raceway (RIR) is a 3/4-mile (1.2 km), D-shaped, asphalt race track located just outside Richmond, Virginia in Henrico County. It hosts the Monster Energy NASCAR Cup Series and Xfinity Series. Known as "America's premier short track", it formerly hosted a NASCAR Camping World Truck Series race, an IndyCar Series race, and two USAC sprint car races.

=== Entry list ===
#	Driver	Team	Make
0	Mike Bliss	Haas CNC Racing	Chevrolet
00	Carl Long	McGlynn Racing	Chevrolet
01	Joe Nemechek	MB2 Motorsports	Chevrolet
2	Rusty Wallace	Penske Racing	Dodge
4	Mike Wallace	Morgan–McClure Motorsports	Chevrolet
5	Kyle Busch	Hendrick Motorsports	Chevrolet
6	Mark Martin	Roush Racing	Ford
7	Robby Gordon	Robby Gordon Motorsports	Chevrolet
07	Dave Blaney	Richard Childress Racing	Chevrolet
8	Dale Earnhardt Jr.	Dale Earnhardt, Inc.	Chevrolet
9	Kasey Kahne	Evernham Motorsports	Dodge
09	Johnny Sauter	Phoenix Racing	Dodge
10	Scott Riggs	MBV Motorsports	Chevrolet
11	Terry Labonte	Joe Gibbs Racing	Chevrolet
12	Ryan Newman	Penske Racing	Dodge
15	Michael Waltrip	Dale Earnhardt, Inc.	Chevrolet
16	Greg Biffle	Roush Racing	Ford
17	Matt Kenseth	Roush Racing	Ford
18	Bobby Labonte	Joe Gibbs Racing	Chevrolet
19	Jeremy Mayfield	Evernham Motorsports	Dodge
20	Tony Stewart	Joe Gibbs Racing	Chevrolet
21	Ricky Rudd	Wood Brothers Racing	Ford
22	Scott Wimmer	Bill Davis Racing	Dodge
24	Jeff Gordon	Hendrick Motorsports	Chevrolet
25	Brian Vickers	Hendrick Motorsports	Chevrolet
27	Kirk Shelmerdine	Kirk Shelmerdine Racing	Ford
29	Kevin Harvick	Richard Childress Racing	Chevrolet
31	Jeff Burton	Richard Childress Racing	Chevrolet
32	Bobby Hamilton Jr.	PPI Motorsports	Chevrolet
34	Joey McCarthy	Mach 1 Motorsports	Chevrolet
37	Tony Raines	R&J Racing	Dodge
38	Elliott Sadler	Robert Yates Racing	Ford
39	David Stremme	Chip Ganassi Racing with Felix Sabates	Dodge
40	Sterling Marlin	Chip Ganassi Racing with Felix Sabates	Dodge
41	Casey Mears	Chip Ganassi Racing with Felix Sabates	Dodge
42	Jamie McMurray	Chip Ganassi Racing with Felix Sabates	Dodge
43	Jeff Green	Petty Enterprises	Dodge
45	Kyle Petty	Petty Enterprises	Dodge
48	Jimmie Johnson	Hendrick Motorsports	Chevrolet
49	Ken Schrader	BAM Racing	Dodge
50	Jimmy Spencer	Arnold Motorsports	Dodge
66	Mike Garvey	Peak Fitness Racing	Ford
75	Wayne Anderson	Rinaldi Racing	Dodge
77	Travis Kvapil	Penske Racing	Dodge
88	Dale Jarrett	Robert Yates Racing	Ford
89	Morgan Shepherd	Shepherd Racing Ventures	Dodge
92	Hermie Sadler	Front Row Motorsports	Chevrolet
95	Stanton Barrett	Stanton Barrett Motorsports	Chevrolet
97	Kurt Busch	Roush Racing	Ford
99	Carl Edwards	Roush Racing	Ford
Official entry list

== Practice ==
The only 2-hour practice session would start on Friday, September 9, at 12:00 PM EST. Ryan Newman of Penske Racing would set the fastest time in the session, with a lap of 21.221 and an average speed of 127.232 miles per hour (204.760 km/h).

Pos.	#	Driver	Team	Make	Time	Speed
1	12	Ryan Newman	Penske Racing	Dodge	21.221	127.232
2	16	Greg Biffle	Roush Racing	Ford	21.347	126.481
3	97	Kurt Busch	Roush Racing	Ford	21.392	126.215
Full practice results

== Qualifying ==
Qualifying was held on Friday, September 9, at 6:10 PM EST. Each driver would have two laps to set a fastest time; the fastest of the two would count as their official qualifying lap.

Kevin Harvick of Richard Childress Racing would win the pole, setting a lap of 21.024 and an average speed of 128.425 miles per hour (206.680 km/h).

Kirk Shelmerdine would crash on his second lap coming into turn 3, spinning and hitting the Turn 3-4 wall. While he had set a lap time, the time was not good enough to get him into the race, making Shelmerdine not qualify for the race.

Seven drivers would fail to qualify: Wayne Peterson, Stanton Barrett, Carl Long, Hermie Sadler, Morgan Shepherd, Joey McCarthy, and Kirk Shelmerdine.

Pos.	#	Driver	Team	Make	Time	Speed
1	29	Kevin Harvick	Richard Childress Racing	Chevrolet	21.024	128.425
2	16	Greg Biffle	Roush Racing	Ford	21.043	128.309
3	77	Travis Kvapil	Penske Racing	Dodge	21.067	128.163
4	6	Mark Martin	Roush Racing	Ford	21.099	127.968
5	97	Kurt Busch	Roush Racing	Ford	21.117	127.859
6	24	Jeff Gordon	Hendrick Motorsports	Chevrolet	21.148	127.672
7	5	Kyle Busch	Hendrick Motorsports	Chevrolet	21.159	127.605
8	12	Ryan Newman	Penske Racing	Dodge	21.201	127.353
9	88	Dale Jarrett	Robert Yates Racing	Ford	21.210	127.298
10	19	Jeremy Mayfield	Evernham Motorsports	Dodge	21.211	127.292
11	01	Joe Nemechek	MB2 Motorsports	Chevrolet	21.216	127.262
12	31	Jeff Burton	Richard Childress Racing	Chevrolet	21.218	127.250
13	17	Matt Kenseth	Roush Racing	Ford	21.220	127.239
14	9	Kasey Kahne	Evernham Motorsports	Dodge	21.228	127.190
15	2	Rusty Wallace	Penske Racing	Dodge	21.233	127.161
16	21	Ricky Rudd	Wood Brothers Racing	Ford	21.241	127.113
17	41	Casey Mears	Chip Ganassi Racing with Felix Sabates	Dodge	21.245	127.089
18	99	Carl Edwards	Roush Racing	Ford	21.253	127.041
19	38	Elliott Sadler	Robert Yates Racing	Ford	21.253	127.041
20	43	Jeff Green	Petty Enterprises	Dodge	21.253	127.041
21	37	Tony Raines	R&J Racing	Dodge	21.273	126.921
22	25	Brian Vickers	Hendrick Motorsports	Chevrolet	21.278	126.892
23	18	Bobby Labonte	Joe Gibbs Racing	Chevrolet	21.289	126.826
24	48	Jimmie Johnson	Hendrick Motorsports	Chevrolet	21.297	126.778
25	20	Tony Stewart	Joe Gibbs Racing	Chevrolet	21.303	126.743
26	4	Mike Wallace	Morgan–McClure Motorsports	Chevrolet	21.311	126.695
27	07	Dave Blaney	Richard Childress Racing	Chevrolet	21.351	126.458
28	15	Michael Waltrip	Dale Earnhardt, Inc.	Chevrolet	21.356	126.428
29	8	Dale Earnhardt Jr.	Dale Earnhardt, Inc.	Chevrolet	21.367	126.363
30	22	Scott Wimmer	Bill Davis Racing	Dodge	21.373	126.328
31	0	Mike Bliss	Haas CNC Racing	Chevrolet	21.379	126.292
32	42	Jamie McMurray	Chip Ganassi Racing with Felix Sabates	Dodge	21.390	126.227
33	32	Bobby Hamilton Jr.	PPI Motorsports	Chevrolet	21.421	126.045
34	39	David Stremme	Chip Ganassi Racing with Felix Sabates	Dodge	21.436	125.956
35	50	Jimmy Spencer	Arnold Motorsports	Dodge	21.447	125.892
36	09	Johnny Sauter	Phoenix Racing	Dodge	21.449	125.880
37	10	Scott Riggs	MBV Motorsports	Chevrolet	21.454	125.851
38	7	Robby Gordon	Robby Gordon Motorsports	Chevrolet	21.480	125.698
39	11	Terry Labonte	Joe Gibbs Racing	Chevrolet	21.540	125.348
40	45	Kyle Petty	Petty Enterprises	Dodge	21.600	125.000
41	40	Sterling Marlin	Chip Ganassi Racing with Felix Sabates	Dodge	21.601	124.994
Qualified by owner's points
42	49	Ken Schrader	BAM Racing	Dodge	21.659	124.660
Last car to qualify on time
43	66	Mike Garvey	Peak Fitness Racing	Ford	21.639	124.775
Failed to qualify
44	75	Wayne Anderson	Rinaldi Racing	Dodge	21.641	124.763
45	95	Stanton Barrett	Stanton Barrett Motorsports	Chevrolet	21.659	124.660
46	00	Carl Long	McGlynn Racing	Chevrolet	21.666	124.619
47	92	Hermie Sadler	Front Row Motorsports	Chevrolet	21.834	123.660
48	89	Morgan Shepherd	Shepherd Racing Ventures	Dodge	21.984	122.817
49	34	Joey McCarthy	Mach 1 Motorsports	Chevrolet	22.103	122.155
50	27	Kirk Shelmerdine	Kirk Shelmerdine Racing	Ford	22.357	120.768
Official starting lineup

== Race results ==
Fin	St	#	Driver	Team	Make	Laps	Led	Status	Pts	Winnings
1	5	97	Kurt Busch	Roush Racing	Ford	400	185	running	190	$242,900
2	13	17	Matt Kenseth	Roush Racing	Ford	400	3	running	175	$191,561
3	2	16	Greg Biffle	Roush Racing	Ford	400	3	running	170	$135,700
4	7	5	Kyle Busch	Hendrick Motorsports	Chevrolet	400	10	running	165	$127,800
5	15	2	Rusty Wallace	Penske Racing	Dodge	400	0	running	155	$131,833
6	10	19	Jeremy Mayfield	Evernham Motorsports	Dodge	400	17	running	155	$117,520
7	25	20	Tony Stewart	Joe Gibbs Racing	Chevrolet	400	0	running	146	$126,711
8	14	9	Kasey Kahne	Evernham Motorsports	Dodge	400	6	running	147	$112,025
9	39	11	Terry Labonte	Joe Gibbs Racing	Chevrolet	400	7	running	143	$82,125
10	1	29	Kevin Harvick	Richard Childress Racing	Chevrolet	400	167	running	139	$146,661
11	3	77	Travis Kvapil	Penske Racing	Dodge	400	1	running	135	$82,325
12	8	12	Ryan Newman	Penske Racing	Dodge	400	0	running	127	$113,441
13	4	6	Mark Martin	Roush Racing	Ford	400	0	running	124	$86,525
14	26	4	Mike Wallace	Morgan–McClure Motorsports	Chevrolet	400	0	running	121	$71,575
15	31	0	Mike Bliss	Haas CNC Racing	Chevrolet	400	0	running	118	$70,750
16	20	43	Jeff Green	Petty Enterprises	Dodge	400	0	running	115	$97,686
17	19	38	Elliott Sadler	Robert Yates Racing	Ford	400	0	running	112	$104,741
18	12	31	Jeff Burton	Richard Childress Racing	Chevrolet	400	0	running	109	$94,645
19	42	49	Ken Schrader	BAM Racing	Dodge	400	0	running	106	$68,075
20	29	8	Dale Earnhardt Jr.	Dale Earnhardt, Inc.	Chevrolet	400	0	running	103	$112,808
21	18	99	Carl Edwards	Roush Racing	Ford	400	0	running	100	$83,225
22	23	18	Bobby Labonte	Joe Gibbs Racing	Chevrolet	399	0	running	97	$102,175
23	17	41	Casey Mears	Chip Ganassi Racing with Felix Sabates	Dodge	399	0	running	94	$94,433
24	30	22	Scott Wimmer	Bill Davis Racing	Dodge	399	0	running	91	$91,233
25	24	48	Jimmie Johnson	Hendrick Motorsports	Chevrolet	399	0	running	88	$112,466
26	11	01	Joe Nemechek	MB2 Motorsports	Chevrolet	399	0	running	85	$88,833
27	40	45	Kyle Petty	Petty Enterprises	Dodge	399	0	running	82	$78,108
28	36	09	Johnny Sauter	Phoenix Racing	Dodge	399	0	running	79	$63,225
29	37	10	Scott Riggs	MBV Motorsports	Chevrolet	398	0	running	76	$83,647
30	6	24	Jeff Gordon	Hendrick Motorsports	Chevrolet	398	0	running	73	$112,211
31	28	15	Michael Waltrip	Dale Earnhardt, Inc.	Chevrolet	396	0	running	70	$93,064
32	43	66	Mike Garvey	Peak Fitness Racing	Ford	395	0	running	67	$65,225
33	27	07	Dave Blaney	Richard Childress Racing	Chevrolet	395	0	running	64	$71,550
34	21	37	Tony Raines	R&J Racing	Dodge	394	0	running	61	$62,475
35	38	7	Robby Gordon	Robby Gordon Motorsports	Chevrolet	394	1	running	63	$62,350
36	35	50	Jimmy Spencer	Arnold Motorsports	Dodge	393	0	running	55	$62,200
37	22	25	Brian Vickers	Hendrick Motorsports	Chevrolet	374	0	running	52	$70,075
38	16	21	Ricky Rudd	Wood Brothers Racing	Ford	366	0	crash	49	$89,164
39	9	88	Dale Jarrett	Robert Yates Racing	Ford	364	0	crash	46	$95,983
40	32	42	Jamie McMurray	Chip Ganassi Racing with Felix Sabates	Dodge	362	0	crash	43	$69,700
41	41	40	Sterling Marlin	Chip Ganassi Racing with Felix Sabates	Dodge	358	0	running	40	$89,468
42	34	39	David Stremme	Chip Ganassi Racing with Felix Sabates	Dodge	321	0	crash	37	$61,435
43	33	32	Bobby Hamilton Jr.	PPI Motorsports	Chevrolet	193	0	crash	34	$61,631
Official race results

Previous race: 2005 Sony HD 500	NASCAR Nextel Cup Series; 2005 season	Next race: 2005 Sylvania 300
