= 2004 Sharpie 500 =

Race details
- Race 24 of 36 in the 2004 NASCAR Nextel Cup Series
- The 2004 Sharpie 500 program cover, featuring artwork by Sam Bass. The painting is called "Drive Out Loud!"
- Date: August 28, 2004
- Official name: 44th Annual Sharpie 500
- Location: Bristol, Tennessee, Bristol Motor Speedway
- Course: Permanent racing facility
- Course length: 0.533 miles (0.858 km)
- Distance: 500 laps, 266.5 mi (428.89 km)
- Scheduled distance: 500 laps, 266.5 mi (428.89 km)
- Average speed: 88.538 miles per hour (142.488 km/h)
- Attendance: 160,000

Pole position
| Driver | Jeff Gordon | Hendrick Motorsports |
- Time: 14.930

Most laps led
| Driver | Dale Earnhardt Jr. | Dale Earnhardt, Inc. |
- Laps: 295

Winner
| No. 8 | Dale Earnhardt Jr. | Dale Earnhardt, Inc. |

Television in the United States
- Network: TNT
- Announcers: Allen Bestwick, Benny Parsons, Wally Dallenbach Jr.

Radio in the United States
- Radio: Performance Racing Network

The 2004 Sharpie 500 was the 24th stock car race of the 2004 NASCAR Nextel Cup Series season and the 44th iteration of the event. The race was held on Saturday, August 28, 2004, before a crowd of 160,000 in Bristol, Tennessee at Bristol Motor Speedway, a 0.533 miles (0.858 km) permanent oval-shaped racetrack. The race took the scheduled 500 laps to complete. At race's end, Dale Earnhardt Jr. of Dale Earnhardt, Inc. would pull away in the late stages of the race to win his 13th career NASCAR Nextel Cup Series win and his fourth win of the season. To fill out the podium, Ryan Newman of Penske-Jasper Racing and Jimmie Johnson of Hendrick Motorsports would finish second and third, respectively.

Earnhardt Jr. would coin a slogan during a post-race interview used to advertise the Bristol Motor Speedway: "It's Bristol, baby!"

== Background ==
The layout of Bristol Motor Speedway, the venue where the race was held.

The Bristol Motor Speedway, formerly known as Bristol International Raceway and Bristol Raceway, is a NASCAR short track venue located in Bristol, Tennessee. Constructed in 1960, it held its first NASCAR race on July 30, 1961. Despite its short length, Bristol is among the most popular tracks on the NASCAR schedule because of its distinct features, which include extraordinarily steep banking, an all concrete surface, two pit roads, and stadium-like seating. It has also been named one of the loudest NASCAR tracks.

=== Entry list ===
| # | Driver | Team | Make |
|---|---|---|---|
| 0 | Ward Burton | Haas CNC Racing | Chevrolet |
| 00 | Kenny Wallace | Michael Waltrip Racing | Chevrolet |
| 01 | Joe Nemechek | MBV Motorsports | Chevrolet |
| 2 | Rusty Wallace | Penske-Jasper Racing | Dodge |
| 02 | Hermie Sadler | SCORE Motorsports | Chevrolet |
| 4 | Jimmy Spencer | Morgan–McClure Motorsports | Chevrolet |
| 5 | Terry Labonte | Hendrick Motorsports | Chevrolet |
| 6 | Mark Martin | Roush Racing | Ford |
| 8 | Dale Earnhardt Jr. | Dale Earnhardt, Inc. | Chevrolet |
| 08 | Ryan McGlynn | McGlynn Racing | Chevrolet |
| 9 | Kasey Kahne | Evernham Motorsports | Dodge |
| 09 | Mike Wallace | Phoenix Racing | Dodge |
| 10 | Scott Riggs | MBV Motorsports | Chevrolet |
| 12 | Ryan Newman | Penske-Jasper Racing | Dodge |
| 15 | Michael Waltrip | Dale Earnhardt, Inc. | Chevrolet |
| 16 | Greg Biffle | Roush Racing | Ford |
| 17 | Matt Kenseth | Roush Racing | Ford |
| 18 | Bobby Labonte | Joe Gibbs Racing | Chevrolet |
| 19 | Jeremy Mayfield | Evernham Motorsports | Dodge |
| 20 | Tony Stewart | Joe Gibbs Racing | Chevrolet |
| 21 | Ricky Rudd | Wood Brothers Racing | Ford |
| 22 | Scott Wimmer | Bill Davis Racing | Dodge |
| 24 | Jeff Gordon | Hendrick Motorsports | Chevrolet |
| 25 | Brian Vickers | Hendrick Motorsports | Chevrolet |
| 29 | Kevin Harvick | Richard Childress Racing | Chevrolet |
| 30 | Jeff Burton | Richard Childress Racing | Chevrolet |
| 31 | Robby Gordon | Richard Childress Racing | Chevrolet |
| 32 | Ricky Craven | PPI Motorsports | Chevrolet |
| 37 | Kevin Lepage | R&J Racing | Dodge |
| 38 | Elliott Sadler | Robert Yates Racing | Ford |
| 40 | Sterling Marlin | Chip Ganassi Racing | Dodge |
| 41 | Casey Mears | Chip Ganassi Racing | Dodge |
| 42 | Jamie McMurray | Chip Ganassi Racing | Dodge |
| 43 | Jeff Green | Petty Enterprises | Dodge |
| 45 | Kyle Petty | Petty Enterprises | Dodge |
| 48 | Jimmie Johnson | Hendrick Motorsports | Chevrolet |
| 49 | Ken Schrader | BAM Racing | Dodge |
| 50 | Todd Bodine | Arnold Motorsports | Dodge |
| 51 | Tony Raines | Competitive Edge Motorsports | Chevrolet |
| 52 | Stanton Barrett | Rick Ware Racing | Dodge |
| 72 | Kirk Shelmerdine* | Kirk Shelmerdine Racing | Ford |
| 77 | Brendan Gaughan | Penske-Jasper Racing | Dodge |
| 80 | Tony Ave | Hover Motorsports | Ford |
| 88 | Dale Jarrett | Robert Yates Racing | Ford |
| 89 | Morgan Shepherd | Shepherd Racing Ventures | Dodge |
| 92 | Brad Teague* | Front Row Motorsports | Ford |
| 97 | Kurt Busch | Roush Racing | Ford |
| 98 | Derrike Cope | Mach 1 Motorsports | Ford |
| 99 | Carl Edwards | Roush Racing | Ford |
Official entry list

*Teague would take over Shelmerdine's seat. As a result, the #92 team withdrew.

== Practice ==
=== First practice ===
The first practice session was held on Friday, August 27, at 11:20 AM EST, and would last for 2 hours. Jeff Gordon of Hendrick Motorsports would set the fastest time in the session, with a lap of 14.939 and an average speed of 128.442 miles per hour (206.707 km/h).

| Pos. | # | Driver | Team | Make | Time | Speed |
|---|---|---|---|---|---|---|
| 1 | 24 | Jeff Gordon | Hendrick Motorsports | Chevrolet | 14.939 | 128.442 |
| 2 | 12 | Ryan Newman | Penske-Jasper Racing | Dodge | 15.043 | 127.554 |
| 3 | 31 | Robby Gordon | Richard Childress Racing | Chevrolet | 15.045 | 127.537 |
Full first practice results

=== Second practice ===
The second practice session was held on Friday, August 27, at 4:50 PM EST, and would last for 45 minutes. Jeff Green of Petty Enterprises would set the fastest time in the session, with a lap of 15.485 and an average speed of 123.913 miles per hour (199.419 km/h).

| Pos. | # | Driver | Team | Make | Time | Speed |
|---|---|---|---|---|---|---|
| 1 | 43 | Jeff Green | Petty Enterprises | Dodge | 15.485 | 123.913 |
| 2 | 0 | Ward Burton | Haas CNC Racing | Chevrolet | 15.520 | 123.634 |
| 3 | 22 | Scott Wimmer | Bill Davis Racing | Dodge | 15.531 | 123.547 |
Full second practice results

=== Third and final practice ===
The third and final practice session, sometimes referred to as Happy Hour, was held on Friday, August 27, at 6:10 PM EST, and would last for 45 minutes. Jeff Green of Petty Enterprises would set the fastest time in the session, with a lap of 15.613 and an average speed of 122.898 miles per hour (197.785 km/h).

| Pos. | # | Driver | Team | Make | Time | Speed |
|---|---|---|---|---|---|---|
| 1 | 43 | Jeff Green | Petty Enterprises | Dodge | 15.613 | 122.898 |
| 2 | 0 | Ward Burton | Haas CNC Racing | Chevrolet | 15.635 | 122.725 |
| 3 | 17 | Matt Kenseth | Roush Racing | Ford | 15.644 | 122.654 |
Full Happy Hour practice results

== Qualifying ==
Qualifying was held on Friday, August 27, at 3:10 PM EST. Each driver would have two laps to set a fastest time; the fastest of the two would count as their official qualifying lap. Positions 1-38 would be decided on time, while positions 39-43 would be based on provisionals. Four spots are awarded by the use of provisionals based on owner's points. The fifth is awarded to a past champion who has not otherwise qualified for the race. If no past champ needs the provisional, the next team in the owner points will be awarded a provisional.

Jeff Gordon of Hendrick Motorsports would win the pole, setting a time of 14.930 and an average speed of 128.520 miles per hour (206.833 km/h).

Numerous crashes would occur in the session. First, Tony Ave would spin on his second lap, and while he had made a lap, the lap was not good enough to get Ave into the race. Then, Brendan Gaughan would collide with the wall on his second lap. Finally, Michael Waltrip would spin on his second lap and collide with the turn 1 wall while finishing his lap. While the aforementioned two had crashed, they would both have laps good enough to make it into the race, although with the caveat that they would have to start at the rear for the race.

Five drivers would fail to qualify: Hermie Sadler, Stanton Barrett, Brad Teague, Tony Ave, and Ryan McGlynn.

=== Full qualifying results ===
| Pos. | # | Driver | Team | Make | Time | Speed |
|---|---|---|---|---|---|---|
| 1 | 24 | Jeff Gordon | Hendrick Motorsports | Chevrolet | 14.930 | 128.520 |
| 2 | 9 | Kasey Kahne | Evernham Motorsports | Dodge | 15.060 | 127.410 |
| 3 | 40 | Sterling Marlin | Chip Ganassi Racing | Dodge | 15.074 | 127.292 |
| 4 | 12 | Ryan Newman | Penske-Jasper Racing | Dodge | 15.075 | 127.284 |
| 5 | 42 | Jamie McMurray | Chip Ganassi Racing | Dodge | 15.098 | 127.090 |
| 6 | 20 | Tony Stewart | Joe Gibbs Racing | Chevrolet | 15.112 | 126.972 |
| 7 | 6 | Mark Martin | Roush Racing | Ford | 15.115 | 126.947 |
| 8 | 38 | Elliott Sadler | Robert Yates Racing | Ford | 15.130 | 126.821 |
| 9 | 19 | Jeremy Mayfield | Evernham Motorsports | Dodge | 15.135 | 126.779 |
| 10 | 16 | Greg Biffle | Roush Racing | Ford | 15.148 | 126.670 |
| 11 | 48 | Jimmie Johnson | Hendrick Motorsports | Chevrolet | 15.157 | 126.595 |
| 12 | 5 | Terry Labonte | Hendrick Motorsports | Chevrolet | 15.163 | 126.545 |
| 13 | 2 | Rusty Wallace | Penske-Jasper Racing | Dodge | 15.170 | 126.487 |
| 14 | 88 | Dale Jarrett | Robert Yates Racing | Ford | 15.186 | 126.353 |
| 15 | 30 | Jeff Burton | Richard Childress Racing | Chevrolet | 15.188 | 126.337 |
| 16 | 0 | Ward Burton | Haas CNC Racing | Chevrolet | 15.191 | 126.312 |
| 17 | 77 | Brendan Gaughan | Penske-Jasper Racing | Dodge | 15.195 | 126.278 |
| 18 | 31 | Robby Gordon | Richard Childress Racing | Chevrolet | 15.199 | 126.245 |
| 19 | 18 | Bobby Labonte | Joe Gibbs Racing | Chevrolet | 15.203 | 126.212 |
| 20 | 25 | Brian Vickers | Hendrick Motorsports | Chevrolet | 15.226 | 126.021 |
| 21 | 29 | Kevin Harvick | Richard Childress Racing | Chevrolet | 15.228 | 126.005 |
| 22 | 41 | Casey Mears | Chip Ganassi Racing | Dodge | 15.228 | 126.005 |
| 23 | 17 | Matt Kenseth | Roush Racing | Ford | 15.231 | 125.980 |
| 24 | 97 | Kurt Busch | Roush Racing | Ford | 15.234 | 125.955 |
| 25 | 99 | Carl Edwards | Roush Racing | Ford | 15.246 | 125.856 |
| 26 | 49 | Ken Schrader | BAM Racing | Dodge | 15.246 | 125.856 |
| 27 | 43 | Jeff Green | Petty Enterprises | Dodge | 15.252 | 125.807 |
| 28 | 00 | Kenny Wallace | Michael Waltrip Racing | Chevrolet | 15.263 | 125.716 |
| 29 | 37 | Kevin Lepage | R&J Racing | Dodge | 15.272 | 125.642 |
| 30 | 8 | Dale Earnhardt Jr. | Dale Earnhardt, Inc. | Chevrolet | 15.287 | 125.518 |
| 31 | 45 | Kyle Petty | Petty Enterprises | Dodge | 15.296 | 125.445 |
| 32 | 21 | Ricky Rudd | Wood Brothers Racing | Ford | 15.298 | 125.428 |
| 33 | 51 | Tony Raines | Competitive Edge Motorsports | Chevrolet | 15.315 | 125.289 |
| 34 | 22 | Scott Wimmer | Bill Davis Racing | Dodge | 15.318 | 125.264 |
| 35 | 32 | Ricky Craven | PPI Motorsports | Chevrolet | 15.337 | 125.109 |
| 36 | 15 | Michael Waltrip | Dale Earnhardt, Inc. | Chevrolet | 15.346 | 125.036 |
| 37 | 01 | Joe Nemechek | MBV Motorsports | Chevrolet | 15.389 | 124.687 |
| 38 | 4 | Jimmy Spencer | Morgan–McClure Motorsports | Chevrolet | 15.417 | 124.460 |
Provisionals
| 39 | 10 | Scott Riggs | MBV Motorsports | Chevrolet | 15.457 | 124.138 |
| 40 | 50 | Todd Bodine | Arnold Motorsports | Dodge | 15.560 | 123.316 |
| 41 | 09 | Mike Wallace | Phoenix Racing | Dodge | 15.441 | 124.267 |
| 42 | 98 | Derrike Cope | Mach 1 Motorsports | Ford | 15.586 | 123.110 |
| 43 | 89 | Morgan Shepherd | Shepherd Racing Ventures | Dodge | 15.719 | 122.069 |
Failed to qualify or withdrew
| 44 | 02 | Hermie Sadler | SCORE Motorsports | Chevrolet | 15.481 | 123.946 |
| 45 | 52 | Stanton Barrett | Rick Ware Racing | Dodge | 15.560 | 123.316 |
| 46 | 72 | Brad Teague | Kirk Shelmerdine Racing | Ford | 15.696 | 122.248 |
| 47 | 80 | Tony Ave | Hover Motorsports | Ford | 16.222 | 118.284 |
| 48 | 08 | Ryan McGlynn | McGlynn Racing | Chevrolet | — | — |
| WD | 92 | Brad Teague | Front Row Motorsports | Ford | — | — |
Official qualifying results

== Race results ==
| Fin | # | Driver | Team | Make | Laps | Led | Status | Pts |
|---|---|---|---|---|---|---|---|---|
| 1 | 8 | Dale Earnhardt Jr. | Dale Earnhardt, Inc. | Chevrolet | 500 | 295 | running | 190 |
| 2 | 12 | Ryan Newman | Penske-Jasper Racing | Dodge | 500 | 0 | running | 170 |
| 3 | 48 | Jimmie Johnson | Hendrick Motorsports | Chevrolet | 500 | 20 | running | 170 |
| 4 | 30 | Jeff Burton | Richard Childress Racing | Chevrolet | 500 | 26 | running | 165 |
| 5 | 38 | Elliott Sadler | Robert Yates Racing | Ford | 500 | 0 | running | 155 |
| 6 | 40 | Sterling Marlin | Chip Ganassi Racing | Dodge | 500 | 0 | running | 150 |
| 7 | 42 | Jamie McMurray | Chip Ganassi Racing | Dodge | 500 | 8 | running | 151 |
| 8 | 97 | Kurt Busch | Roush Racing | Ford | 499 | 0 | running | 142 |
| 9 | 17 | Matt Kenseth | Roush Racing | Ford | 499 | 0 | running | 138 |
| 10 | 88 | Dale Jarrett | Robert Yates Racing | Ford | 499 | 1 | running | 139 |
| 11 | 16 | Greg Biffle | Roush Racing | Ford | 499 | 0 | running | 130 |
| 12 | 31 | Robby Gordon | Richard Childress Racing | Chevrolet | 499 | 0 | running | 127 |
| 13 | 6 | Mark Martin | Roush Racing | Ford | 499 | 0 | running | 124 |
| 14 | 24 | Jeff Gordon | Hendrick Motorsports | Chevrolet | 498 | 60 | running | 126 |
| 15 | 5 | Terry Labonte | Hendrick Motorsports | Chevrolet | 498 | 0 | running | 118 |
| 16 | 18 | Bobby Labonte | Joe Gibbs Racing | Chevrolet | 498 | 1 | running | 120 |
| 17 | 10 | Scott Riggs | MBV Motorsports | Chevrolet | 497 | 0 | running | 112 |
| 18 | 0 | Ward Burton | Haas CNC Racing | Chevrolet | 497 | 0 | running | 109 |
| 19 | 20 | Tony Stewart | Joe Gibbs Racing | Chevrolet | 497 | 0 | running | 106 |
| 20 | 25 | Brian Vickers | Hendrick Motorsports | Chevrolet | 497 | 0 | running | 103 |
| 21 | 9 | Kasey Kahne | Evernham Motorsports | Dodge | 496 | 0 | running | 100 |
| 22 | 19 | Jeremy Mayfield | Evernham Motorsports | Dodge | 496 | 0 | running | 97 |
| 23 | 50 | Todd Bodine | Arnold Motorsports | Dodge | 495 | 3 | running | 99 |
| 24 | 29 | Kevin Harvick | Richard Childress Racing | Chevrolet | 494 | 0 | running | 91 |
| 25 | 00 | Kenny Wallace | Michael Waltrip Racing | Chevrolet | 493 | 0 | running | 88 |
| 26 | 2 | Rusty Wallace | Penske-Jasper Racing | Dodge | 490 | 79 | running | 90 |
| 27 | 15 | Michael Waltrip | Dale Earnhardt, Inc. | Chevrolet | 481 | 7 | running | 87 |
| 28 | 09 | Mike Wallace | Phoenix Racing | Dodge | 468 | 0 | running | 79 |
| 29 | 43 | Jeff Green | Petty Enterprises | Dodge | 462 | 0 | running | 76 |
| 30 | 41 | Casey Mears | Chip Ganassi Racing | Dodge | 433 | 0 | crash | 73 |
| 31 | 4 | Jimmy Spencer | Morgan–McClure Motorsports | Chevrolet | 430 | 0 | running | 70 |
| 32 | 49 | Ken Schrader | BAM Racing | Dodge | 418 | 0 | running | 67 |
| 33 | 99 | Carl Edwards | Roush Racing | Ford | 386 | 0 | crash | 64 |
| 34 | 32 | Ricky Craven | PPI Motorsports | Chevrolet | 373 | 0 | crash | 61 |
| 35 | 77 | Brendan Gaughan | Penske-Jasper Racing | Dodge | 313 | 0 | crash | 58 |
| 36 | 22 | Scott Wimmer | Bill Davis Racing | Dodge | 268 | 0 | crash | 55 |
| 37 | 45 | Kyle Petty | Petty Enterprises | Dodge | 150 | 0 | crash | 52 |
| 38 | 98 | Derrike Cope | Mach 1 Motorsports | Ford | 121 | 0 | brakes | 49 |
| 39 | 51 | Tony Raines | Competitive Edge Motorsports | Chevrolet | 88 | 0 | crash | 46 |
| 40 | 21 | Ricky Rudd | Wood Brothers Racing | Ford | 64 | 0 | crash | 43 |
| 41 | 89 | Morgan Shepherd | Shepherd Racing Ventures | Dodge | 49 | 0 | handling | 40 |
| 42 | 01 | Joe Nemechek | MBV Motorsports | Chevrolet | 31 | 0 | crash | 37 |
| 43 | 37 | Kevin Lepage | R&J Racing | Dodge | 11 | 0 | vibration | 34 |
Official race results

| Previous race: 2004 GFS Marketplace 400 | NASCAR Nextel Cup Series; 2004 season | Next race: 2004 Pop Secret 500 |
