= 2005 Sony HD 500 =

Stock car race held in Fontana, California (2005)

Race details
- Race 25 of 36 in the 2005 NASCAR Nextel Cup Series
- The 2005 Sony HD 500 program cover, featuring Elliott Sadler.
- Date: September 4, 2005
- Official name: Sony HD 500
- Location: California Speedway, Fontana, California
- Course: Permanent racing facility
- Course length: 2.0 miles (3.219 km)
- Distance: 254 laps, 508 mi (817.547 km)
- Scheduled distance: 250 laps, 500 mi (804.672 km)
- Weather: Temperatures up to 93.4 °F (34.1 °C); wind speeds around 5.18 mph (8.34 km/h)
- Average speed: 136.356 miles per hour (219.444 km/h)
- Attendance: 100,000

Pole position
Driver	Carl Edwards	Roush Racing
- Time: 38.906

Most laps led
Driver	Kyle Busch	Hendrick Motorsports
- Laps: 95

Winner
No. 5	Kyle Busch	Hendrick Motorsports

Television in the United States
- Network: NBC
- Announcers: Bill Weber, Benny Parsons and Wally Dallenbach Jr.
- Nielsen ratings: 5.2/10 (Final); 4.4/8 (Overnight)

Radio in the United States
- Radio: Motor Racing Network
- Booth announcers: Joe Moore, Adam Alexander
- Turn announcers: Dave Moody (1 & 2), and Dan Hubbard (3 & 4)

The 2005 Sony HD 500 was a NASCAR Nextel Cup Series stock car race held on September 4, 2005, in Fontana, California at California Speedway, a superspeedway track, before a crowd of approximately 100,000 spectators. It was the twenty-fifth race of the 2005 NASCAR Nextel Cup Series. Kyle Busch of the Hendrick Motorsports team won the 254-lap race, which was extended by four laps because of a green–white–checkered finish. Roush Racing driver Greg Biffle finished second, and Busch's teammate Brian Vickers was third.

Tony Stewart led the Drivers' Championship by 213 points over Jimmie Johnson before the race. Carl Edwards earned his first pole position by recording the quickest lap time of qualifications. Beginning on lap two, the lead was traded several times between Edwards' Roush Racing teammates Mark Martin, Kurt Busch, and Biffle before Edwards reclaimed the top position during a restart on the 27th lap; he led until a tire puncture caused him to spin on lap 47. Kyle Busch became the first non-Roush Racing driver to lead on lap 82, and although Matt Kenseth consistently made fast pit stops to claim the lead during caution periods, Busch repeatedly overtook him on restarts. During a lap-242 caution for debris, Kyle Busch switched two tires as opposed to four because he parked his car too close to the pit wall, but quickly passed the two cars ahead of him and held off his competitors to achieve his first Nextel Cup Series win, becoming the youngest driver to do so. (Note: The record was later broken by Joey Logano, who won the 2009 Lenox Industrial Tools 301 at 19 years, one month, and four days old.) The lead was changed 30 times between 12 drivers and the caution flag was issued 11 times.

The final result meant that Stewart maintained his Drivers' Championship lead, while Biffle took the second position from Johnson and Ryan Newman and Jeff Gordon were displaced from the final two provisional spots of the Chase for the Nextel Cup by Kenseth and Jamie McMurray, respectively. Joe Gibbs also kept his lead in the Owners' Championship, as did Chevrolet in the Manufacturers' Championship with 11 races left in the season.

== Background ==
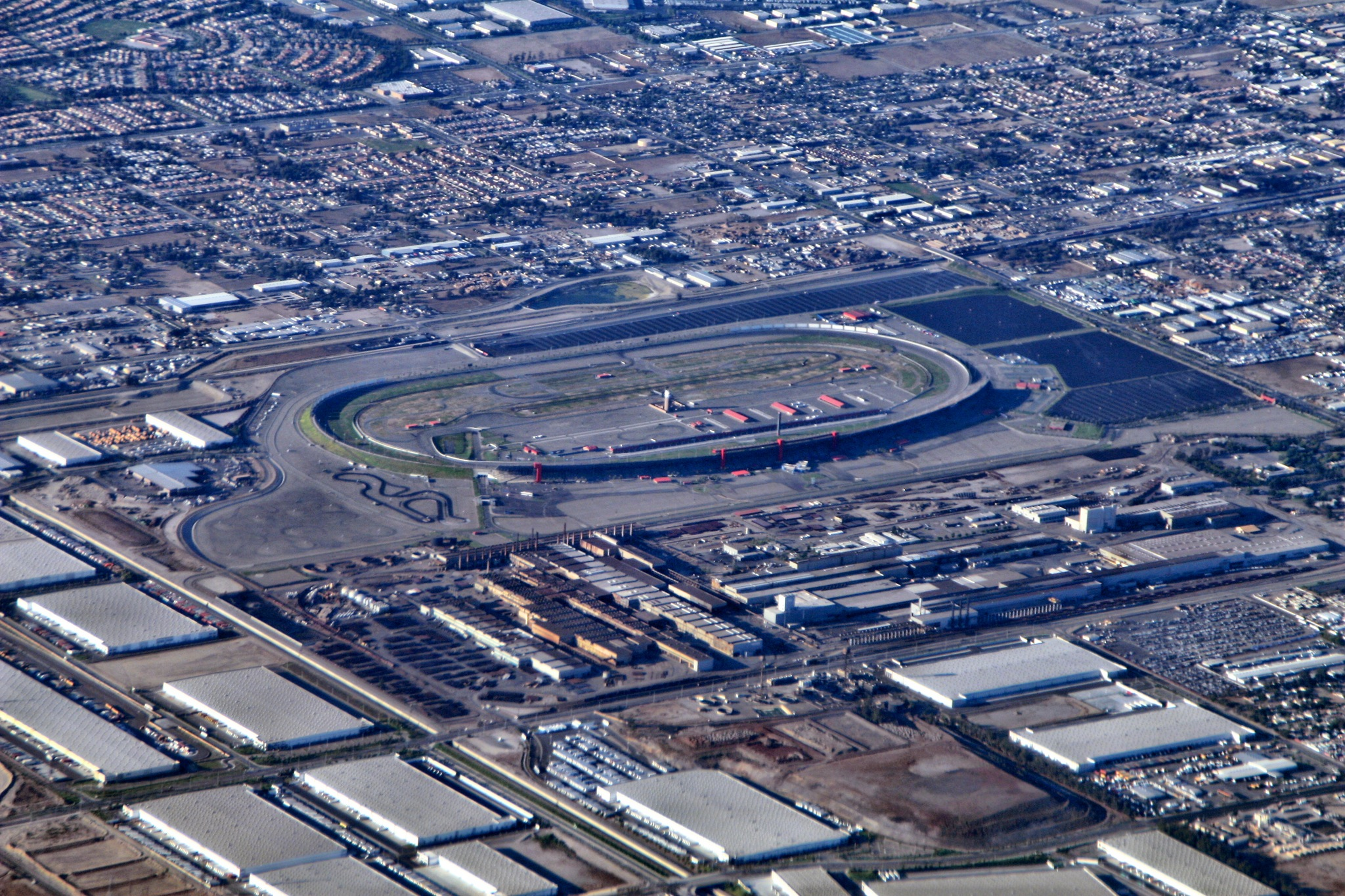
California Speedway (later renamed to Auto Club Speedway, pictured in 2007), where the race was held.

The 2005 Sony HD 500 was the 25th of 36 scheduled stock car races of the 2005 NASCAR Nextel Cup Series. It was scheduled to run for 250 laps over a distance of 500 miles (800 km), and was held on Sunday, September 4, 2005, in Fontana, California at California Speedway, a superspeedway that hosted NASCAR races. Its standard layout is a four-turn, 1.5 mi (2.4 km)-long D-shaped oval track with banking of 14 degrees in the turns, 11 degrees in the front stretch (where the start-finish line is located), and three degrees in the back stretch. The NASCAR Nextel Cup Series raced at the track every year since 1997; beginning in 2004, a second event at the track was added to the schedule on Labor Day weekend, taking the traditional slot of the Southern 500 at Darlington Raceway.

Heading into the race, Tony Stewart led the Drivers' Championship with 3,410 points, 213 more than Jimmie Johnson in second place and 224 more than third-place Greg Biffle. Rusty Wallace was fourth with 3,139 points and Mark Martin was fifth with 3,014. Jeremy Mayfield, Kurt Busch, Carl Edwards, Ryan Newman, and Jeff Gordon rounded out the top ten positions. Stewart, Johnson, and Biffle had already clinched spots for the ten-race season-ending 2005 Chase for the Nextel Cup, while Wallace simply needed to start the Sony HD 500 to ensure his spot and Martin had to finish no worse than fifth. The respective cars that they drove, owned by Joe Gibbs (Stewart's No. 20 car), Jeff Gordon (Johnson's No. 48 car), Geoff Smith (Biffle's No. 16 car), Roger Penske (Wallace's No. 2 and Newman's No. 12 cars), Jack Roush (Martin's No. 6 and Edwards' No. 99 cars), Ray Evernham (Mayfield's No. 19 car), Georgetta Roush (Kurt Busch's No. 97 car), and Rick Hendrick (Gordon's No. 24 car), were ordered in the same positions with the same point amounts for the Owners' Championship. Chevrolet led the Manufacturers' Championship with 176 points, followed by Ford (160 points) and Dodge (120 points). Elliott Sadler was the race's defending winner.

After earning his first win of the season in the preceding Sharpie 500, Matt Kenseth hoped to carry his team's positive momentum into the Sony HD 500 with a car that performed well in the races at Michigan International Speedway and Chicagoland Speedway. Stewart, who had finished inside the top-ten in the past ten races, compared California Speedway to Michigan because of their similar layouts: "California is a lot like Michigan. I like to call it Michigan West. I'm not sure that it has the amount of banking that Michigan has, but it is a flatter track than Michigan. The way you approach the weekend is pretty much the same as far as setups on The Home Depot Chevrolet go. You just don't have the banking to help you like you do at Michigan." Sadler revealed that he would be driving the same car that he raced in the Brickyard 400, which he considered his team's best car, and was optimistic in his chance to claim a spot in the Chase for the Nextel Cup. Johnson spoke of his new approach to upcoming races for the Chase: "Last year, we tested too close to race time and weren't able to get the full benefit from the test session. This year, we've got a little better plan and are leaving ourselves some more time to get prepared."

There was one change of driver before the race; NASCAR Busch Series driver J. J. Yeley made his season début in the race, taking Terry Labonte's seat. He expressed confidence ahead of the race because of previous tests that he had completed at Kentucky Speedway and New Hampshire International Speedway. Ricky Rudd was substituted by Jon Wood in the practice and qualifying sessions as he mourned his father, Al Rudd Sr., who died the Tuesday before the race; he arrived in California on Saturday, one day after attending his funeral, to compete in the race. Many cars, including all five from the Roush Racing team, ran with decals commemorating Rudd's father. Evernham Motorsports also entered a third car with 1988 NASCAR Winston Cup Series champion Bill Elliott for the first time since the Batman Begins 400 in June as part of a two-race sponsorship deal with McDonald's.

== Practice and qualifying ==
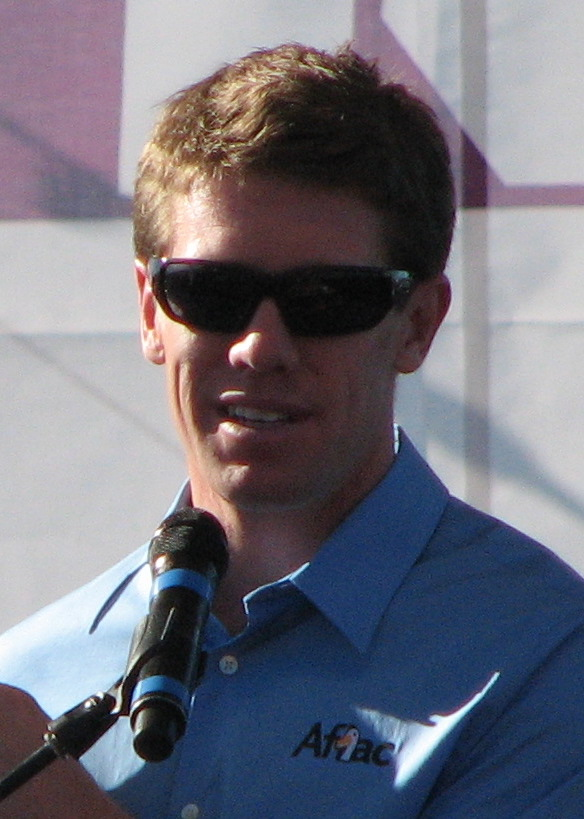
Carl Edwards (pictured in 2010) earned the first pole position of his career with a 38.906-second lap.

Two practice sessions were held before the Sunday race, one 100-minute session on Friday and another 50-minute session on Saturday. Jeff Gordon was quickest in the first practice session with a lap time of 39.354 seconds; Kurt Busch, Johnson, Martin, and Kenseth rounded out the session's five fastest drivers. On Saturday morning, Gordon bettered his quickest time with a 39.187-second lap in the second practice session. Edwards was second-quickest, Kyle Busch was third, Joe Nemechek was fourth, and Michael Waltrip was fifth.

A total of 45 cars were entered for the qualifying session on Saturday afternoon, but due to NASCAR's qualifying procedure, only 43 were allowed to race. The order of qualifications was set by a random draw earlier that morning. Each driver was required to complete two timed laps to determine the first 42 starting positions, while the driver in 43rd would qualify through the use of a provisional if needed. Edwards took the first pole position of his career with a time of 38.906 seconds and was joined on the grid's front row by Martin, who was 0.048 seconds slower and held the position until Edwards' lap. Kurt Busch was third and Biffle fourth to complete a top-four sweep for Roush Racing; it was the first time in the Nextel Cup Series' modern era (1972–present) that a team qualified in the first four positions. Johnson, Jeff Gordon, Kasey Kahne, Yeley, Brian Vickers, and Scott Riggs completed the top-ten starters. The two drivers that failed to qualify were P. J. Jones and John Andretti, the latter of whom suffered an issue that forced him to miss qualifications. After qualifying, Edwards remained focused on making the Chase: "We still have to deal with two really tough races. In our position with our Office Depot team, I feel like we're so close to being in it or out of it that we're just gonna do our best. If we don't make it, we've got a million reasons why we shouldn't, but if we do it would be just awesome. It would mean the world to me."

=== Qualifying results ===
Grid	No.	Driver	Team	Manufacturer	Time	Speed
1	99	Carl Edwards	Roush Racing	Ford	38.906	185.061
2	6	Mark Martin	Roush Racing	Ford	38.954	184.833
3	97	Kurt Busch	Roush Racing	Ford	39.045	184.403
4	16	Greg Biffle	Roush Racing	Ford	39.052	184.370
5	48	Jimmie Johnson	Hendrick Motorsports	Chevrolet	39.120	184.049
6	24	Jeff Gordon	Hendrick Motorsports	Chevrolet	39.166	183.833
7	9	Kasey Kahne	Evernham Motorsports	Dodge	39.172	183.805
8	11	J. J. Yeley	Joe Gibbs Racing	Chevrolet	39.182	183.758
9	25	Brian Vickers	Hendrick Motorsports	Chevrolet	39.194	183.702
10	10	Scott Riggs	Evernham Motorsports	Chevrolet	39.241	183.482
11	32	Bobby Hamilton Jr.	PPI Motorsports	Chevrolet	39.251	183.435
12	40	Sterling Marlin	Chip Ganassi Racing	Dodge	39.276	183.318
13	19	Jeremy Mayfield	Evernham Motorsports	Dodge	39.278	183.309
14	20	Tony Stewart	Joe Gibbs Racing	Chevrolet	39.347	182.987
15	38	Elliott Sadler	Robert Yates Racing	Ford	39.357	182.941
16	31	Jeff Burton	Richard Childress Racing	Chevrolet	39.363	182.913
17	43	Jeff Green	Petty Enterprises	Dodge	39.400	182.741
18	29	Kevin Harvick	Richard Childress Racing	Chevrolet	39.403	182.727
19	15	Michael Waltrip	Dale Earnhardt, Inc.	Chevrolet	39.439	182.560
20	45	Kyle Petty	Petty Enterprises	Dodge	39.443	182.542
21	07	Dave Blaney	Richard Childress Racing	Chevrolet	39.448	182.519
22	01	Joe Nemechek	MB2 Motorsports	Chevrolet	39.455	182.486
23	17	Matt Kenseth	Roush Racing	Ford	39.478	182.380
24	7	Robby Gordon	Robby Gordon Motorsports	Chevrolet	39.499	182.283^{1}
25	5	Kyle Busch	Hendrick Motorsports	Chevrolet	39.518	182.195
26	36	Boris Said	MB/Sutton Motorsports	Chevrolet	39.551	182.043
27	22	Scott Wimmer	Bill Davis Racing	Dodge	39.615	181.749
28	12	Ryan Newman	Penske Racing	Dodge	39.620	181.726
29	77	Travis Kvapil	Penske Racing	Dodge	39.702	181.351
30	91	Bill Elliott	Evernham Motorsports	Dodge	39.729	181.228
31	49	Ken Schrader	BAM Racing	Dodge	39.748	181.141
32	37	Tony Raines	R&J Racing	Dodge	39.781	180.991
33	41	Casey Mears	Chip Ganassi Racing	Dodge	39.807	180.873
34	2	Rusty Wallace	Penske Racing	Dodge	39.881	180.537
35	51	Stuart Kirby	Competitive Edge Motorsports	Chevrolet	39.884	180.523
36	66	Mike Garvey	Peak Performance Motorsports	Ford	39.908	180.415
37	88	Dale Jarrett	Robert Yates Racing	Ford	39.944	180.252
38	0	Mike Bliss	Haas Automation	Chevrolet	39.976	180.108
39	21	Jon Wood	Wood Brothers Racing	Ford	40.041	179.816^{1}
40	42	Jamie McMurray	Chip Ganassi Racing	Dodge	40.057	179.744
41	8	Dale Earnhardt Jr.	Dale Earnhardt, Inc.	Chevrolet	40.071	179.681
42	18	Bobby Labonte	Joe Gibbs Racing	Chevrolet	40.763	176.631
43	92	Hermie Sadler	Front Row Motorsports	Dodge	40.798	176.479
Failed to qualify
44	34	P. J. Jones	Mach One Motorsports	Chevrolet	40.900	176.039
45	4	John Andretti	Morgan–McClure Motorsports	Chevrolet	No time	No speed
^{1} Moved to the back of the field for changing transmissions (#7) and for changing drivers (#21)

== Race ==
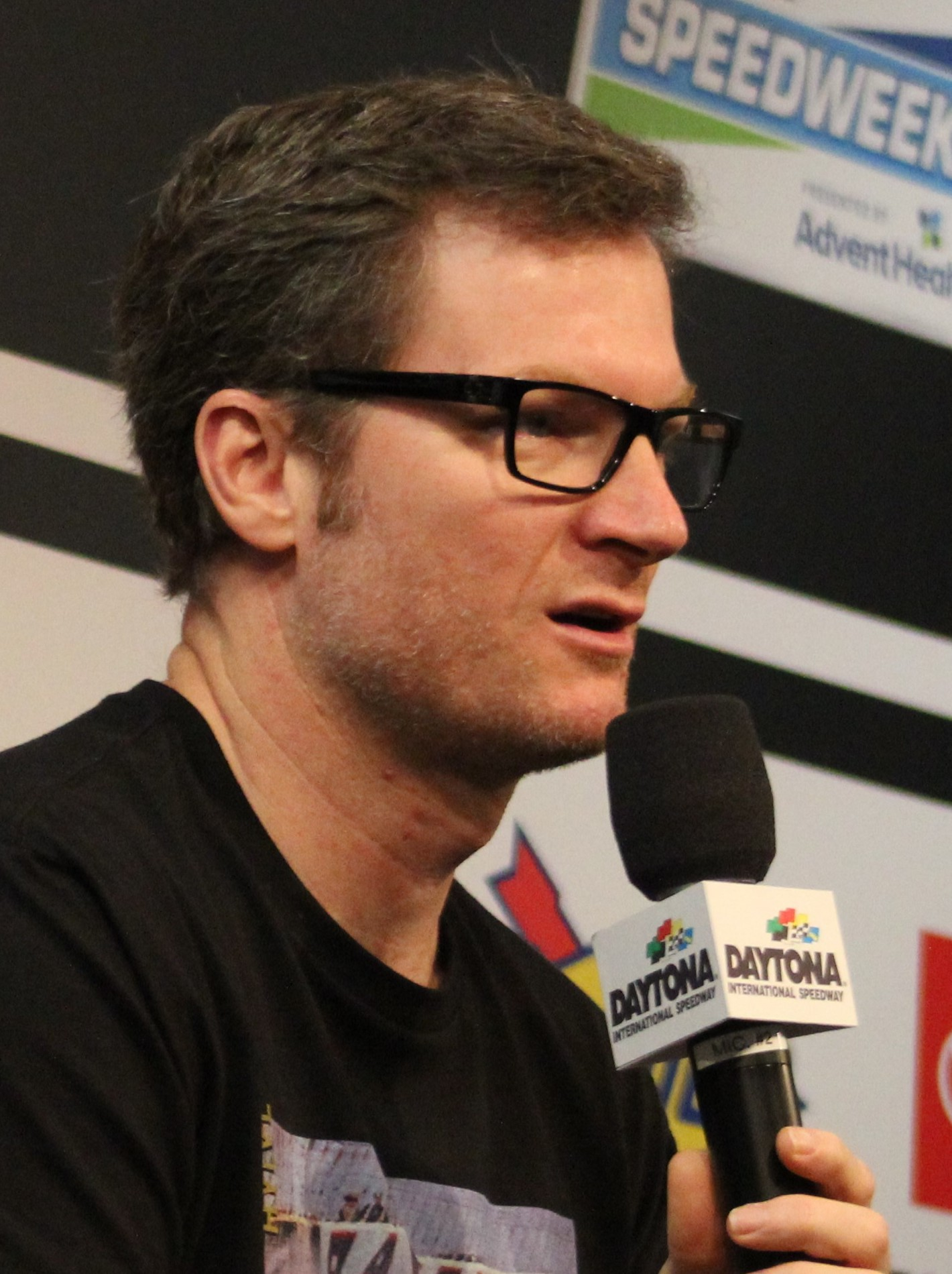
Dale Earnhardt Jr. (pictured in 2020) was eliminated from contention for the Chase for the Nextel Cup by virtue of a 38th-place finish.

Live television coverage of the 250-lap race in the United States was broadcast on NBC and began at 4:00 p.m. Pacific Daylight Time (UTC−07:00). Commentary was provided by Bill Weber, Benny Parsons, and Wally Dallenbach Jr. The air temperature towards the start of the race was 93 °F (34 °C). Motor Racing Outreach member Tim Griffin began pre-race ceremonies with an invocation, and country singer Josh Kelley performed the national anthem. Actor Josh Duhamel of the NBC television series Las Vegas commanded the drivers to start their engines. During the pace laps, Robby Gordon dropped to the rear of the 43-car field for switching transmissions, as did Rudd for a driver change during the weekend. Los Angeles Dodgers Hall of Fame manager Tommy Lasorda waved the green flag at 5:10 p.m. to begin the race. Edwards maintained the lead on the first lap, but Martin passed him the next. Exiting turn four, Yeley was spun from behind by Kahne and contacted the wall with the rear end of his car. The accident prompted the first caution flag on lap three.

Martin led the field back up to speed at the restart on lap six; he was promptly overtaken by Kurt Busch approaching turn one. Five laps later, Biffle got by Busch at the start-finish line, while Stewart had improved from 14th to fifth. Casey Mears similarly moved up 13 positions to 21st by lap 14. On the 20th lap, Kenseth fell to 26th after hitting the wall four laps earlier because of visibility issues from the sun setting. Four laps later, Mike Garvey brought put the race's second caution flag when his car spewed smoke. All of the racers made pit stops during the caution period, with Biffle leaving pit road first to defend his lead over Edwards, Kurt Busch, Johnson, and Martin. On the lap-27 restart, however, Edwards quickly passed Biffle for the lead. By lap 36, Kyle Busch and Waltrip moved into the top-ten for the first time, while Jeff Gordon dropped to 34th place six laps later because of a loose-handling car. On the 47th lap, Edwards spun after his left-rear tire flattened in turn four but avoided hitting anything, though the spin still prompted the third caution. Edwards rejoined the race in the 37th position as he and all other leaders made pit stops under caution.

Green-flag racing resumed on lap 51, with Kurt Busch, Stewart, Johnson, Vickers, and Kyle Busch in the top-five. Five laps later, Johnson hit the front stretch wall, but continued without losing his pace and passed Stewart for second place on the back stretch, only for Johnson to be demoted to fifth behind Stewart and Kyle Busch the following lap. Mears made an unscheduled pit stop on the 59th lap for a vibration within his car. By lap 70, Edwards made his way up to 28th, whereas Jeff Gordon remained stuck in 31st place. Dale Earnhardt Jr. also made up 20 positions to hold 19th place by the 80th lap. Meanwhile, Kyle Busch began reeling in his older brother Kurt and, on lap 82, he passed him for the lead, becoming the first non-Roush Racing driver to lead a lap. As Wallace made a pit stop under green-flag conditions, the caution flag was issued for the fourth time on lap 94 when Hermie Sadler parked his car sideways on the back stretch. The leaders made pit stops again for tires and fuel. Johnson's stop was elongated as his team replaced a faulty shock absorber within his right-front tire, which dropped him to 32nd.

Stewart, Martin, Kyle Busch, Kurt Busch, and Vickers were in the top-five at the restart on lap 99, during which Wallace was lapped by Stewart. He held a 0.995-second advantage over Martin when the caution flag was flown for the fifth time for debris spotted in between the first and second turns. After the ensuing pit stops, Waltrip emerged as the new leader ahead of Stewart, Martin, and Biffle because he changed two tires rather than four. However, Stewart immediately overtook him for the lead during the lap-119 restart and by the 121st lap, he had already fallen to seventh. The next green-flag stint, which saw Rudd improve to 13th by lap 136 and Johnson to 12th by lap 139, was interrupted by the race's sixth caution for Kurt Busch spinning through the infield grass on the front stretch on lap 145.

Kenseth beat Stewart off of pit road to claim the lead from him ahead of the restart on lap 149, with Martin in third, Kyle Busch in fourth, and Sterling Marlin in fifth. It only took one lap for Kenseth to be demoted to third place behind Stewart and Kyle Busch. On lap 152, Kyle Busch drove past Stewart to reclaim the lead. He quickly pulled out an advantage of nearly a second over Stewart by the 160th lap, while Edwards recovered from his earlier spin to climb up to eighth place. Mike Bliss brought out the caution flag for the seventh time on lap 166 when he spun at the exit of the second corner. During the pit stops, Kenseth again advanced to the front of the field, with Stewart, Martin, Kyle Busch, and Biffle completing the top-five. Sadler was relegated to 33rd place because of two extra pit stops. Stewart, meanwhile, quickly took back the lead from Kenseth on the lap-170 restart. Four laps later, Kyle Busch made another pass on Stewart to retake the top position.

On the 187th lap, a hard-charging Kahne began to battle for the second position with Stewart, who eventually got by him five laps later. On lap 200, the caution was thrown for the eighth time as Boris Said lost control and spun off of turn two. All of the leaders made what they anticipated would be their final pit stops to top off on fuel. Once again, Kenseth had a quick stop and regained the lead for the restart on the 206th lap, followed by Kyle Busch, Stewart, Martin, and Edwards. Four laps later, Busch reclaimed the lead from Kenseth. On the 211th lap, Earnhardt blew an engine and spewed oil from his car, forcing him to pull into the garage. His subsequent retirement from the race effectively eliminated his chances of joining the Chase for the Nextel Cup.

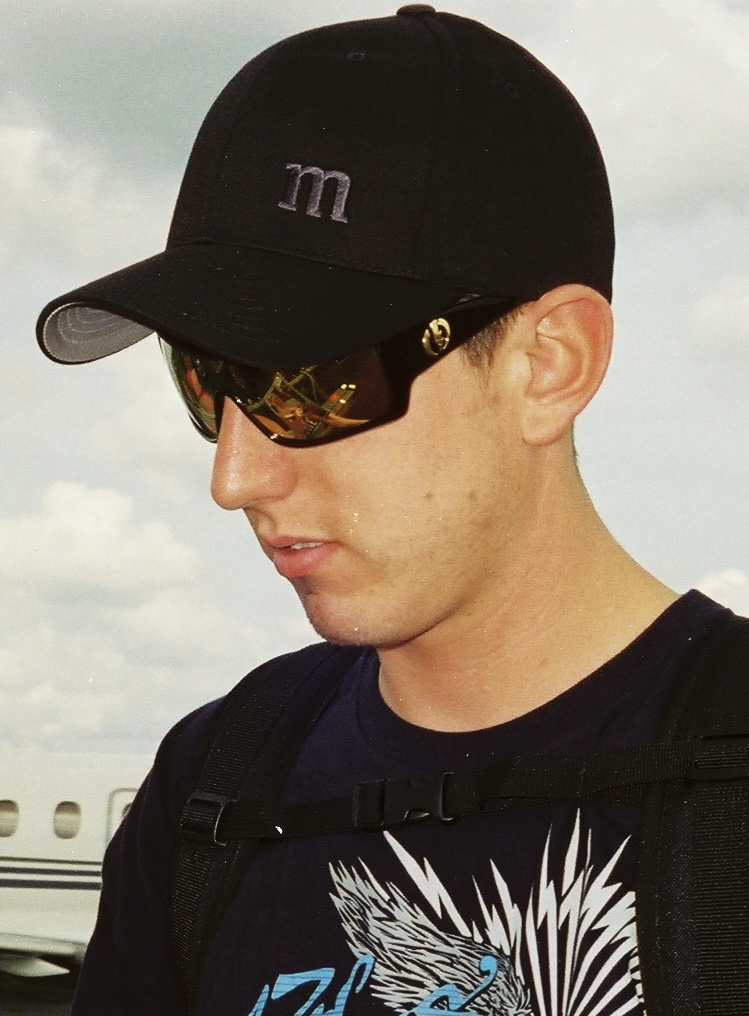
Kyle Busch (pictured in 2010) earned his first victory and was the youngest winner in Nextel Cup Series history.

The ninth caution of the race to clean up the track was issued for only three laps before Kyle Busch led the field back to green-flag racing on the 216th lap, with Kenseth second and Stewart third. Edwards made his way up to the second position by lap 228, but six laps later, he fell to fourth place behind Kenseth and Stewart, while Busch amassed a lead of three seconds. On lap 242, however, Busch's win was threatened when the tenth caution was flown for debris on the track. Kyle Busch steered into pit road with the intent of faking out, but when his competitors followed him in, he opted to make a pit stop. His crew chief Alan Gustafson initially called to replace all four tires, but decided only to switch his right-side tires because he came in too close to the pit wall for his crew members to swap his tires on the left side. Biffle and Vickers also made two-tire stops, while Robby Gordon and Jeff Green remained on-track and assumed the top-two positions for the restart on lap 244. Despite having a disadvantage of less fresher tires over the drivers behind him, Kyle Busch easily got around the two drivers to take the lead once more.

On the 248th lap, the 11th caution was thrown: Marlin hit Riggs from behind in turn two, causing Riggs to veer into Robby Gordon, who then hit the wall. Riggs was hit again by Scott Wimmer. Jeff Burton also collided with the wall. Because there was too little time to clear the track of debris, the race was extended beyond its scheduled 250-lap distance for a green–white–checkered finish. Undeterred, Kyle Busch led the final two laps to earn his first Nextel Cup Series victory in his 31st start. He became the youngest winner in the series' history at the age of 20 years, four months, and two days, outdoing the previous record set by Donald Thomas in a 1952 race at Lakewood Speedway by four days. Biffle finished second, Vickers third, Edwards fourth, and Stewart fifth. Kahne nosed ahead of Kenseth to take sixth, followed by Jamie McMurray in eighth, Rudd in ninth, and Nemechek in tenth. The race had 11 cautions and 30 lead changes among 12 different drivers. Kyle Busch led five times for a total of 95 laps, more than any other racer.

=== Post-race ===
"There was a lot of redemption with that first win at Fontana. You know, from not being allowed to run the Truck race [in 2001] because I was too young to coming back and winning in just my third time there. As it’s turned out, I’ve had pretty good success there. I enjoy going out to California."

— Kyle Busch recalling his first Nextel Cup Series victory to Autoweek in 2022.

Kyle Busch appeared in victory lane in front of a crowd of 100,000 spectators to celebrate his first career victory, which earned him $241,065. He planned on donating his winner's purse to the victims of Hurricane Katrina, telling his team owner Rick Hendrick: "We're going to donate your share and my share to them down there. I saw Carl Edwards [the Busch Series race winner on Saturday] do that last night and I thought it was a real class act, so I'm going to do the same." He also spoke on his team's last pit stop: "My nerves were getting to me. When I made that last pit stop, everybody followed me in and I thought, 'Cool, we're going to be all right.' That stop is what got us the win." Second-place Biffle was pleased with his team's recent string of consistent top-five finishes: "That means a lot. A sixth at Michigan, that was a win for us. We went there and ran really well and led a lot of laps and finished sixth, but then third at Bristol and second here tonight. We can't be happier right now. The whole team is just excited." Vickers, in third, discussed the issues he faced with the handling of his car, which he felt was loose in the majority of the race and tight after the last pit stop.

Earnhardt was annoyed with his engine's poor performance during the race, stating: "It finally broke. We struggled all day and all night down the straightaway. We ran it hot in qualifying, I did, and might have burned something up in the motor and it finally just broke. Our car was horrible. But it's real disappointing." He added that his championship hopes "ha[d] been over for at least 80 laps" and was "surprised you all are surprised." Jeff Gordon was in 10th place during the lap-216 restart, but an ill-handling car dropped him to 21st by the end; he was pessimistic about his chances to clinch a Chase spot: "It was pathetic. We'll go to Richmond and see what we can do. It doesn't matter right now [where we race]. Everywhere we go, we either stink or we're good. Apparently what we've done in the past doesn't mean anything right now." Newman had a positive outlook about his Chase hopes, stating: "We're still alive now. We've got our heads just barely below water. We've got a chance to come up for a breath of fresh air."

The final race result meant that Stewart held onto the Drivers' Championship lead with 3,570 points and a 209-point gap over Biffle, who demoted Johnson (3,312 points) to third. Wallace, in fourth place on 3,257 points, and Martin, fifth on 3,149, solidified their positions in the Chase for the Nextel Cup, while sixth-place Kurt Busch (3,114 points) only needed to start the next round, the Chevy Rock & Roll 400, in order to do so. Mayfield, Edwards, Kenseth, and McMurray assumed the last four Chase spots, the latter two displacing Newman and Jeff Gordon out. Gibbs' No. 20 team also maintained his Owners' Championship lead, ahead of Smith's No. 16, Jeff Gordon's No. 48, Penske's No. 2, Jack Roush's No. 6, Georgetta Roush's No. 97, Evernham's No. 19, Jack Roush's No. 99, Martin's No. 17, and Floyd Ganassi's No. 42 teams. For the Manufacturers' Championship, Chevrolet continued leading with 185 points, with Ford in second on 166 and Dodge in third on 124 with 11 races remaining in the season. The race took three hours, forty-three minutes, and thirty-three seconds to complete, and the margin of victory was 0.554 seconds.

=== Race results ===
Pos	Grid	No.	Driver	Team	Manufacturer	Laps	Points
1	25	5	Kyle Busch	Hendrick Motorsports	Chevrolet	254	190^{2}
2	4	16	Greg Biffle	Roush Racing	Ford	254	175^{1}
3	9	25	Brian Vickers	Hendrick Motorsports	Chevrolet	254	165
4	1	99	Carl Edwards	Roush Racing	Ford	254	165^{1}
5	14	20	Tony Stewart	Joe Gibbs Racing	Chevrolet	254	160^{1}
6	7	9	Kasey Kahne	Evernham Motorsports	Dodge	254	150
7	23	17	Matt Kenseth	Roush Racing	Ford	254	151^{1}
8	40	42	Jamie McMurray	Chip Ganassi Racing	Dodge	254	142
9	39	21	Ricky Rudd	Wood Brothers Racing	Ford	254	138
10	22	01	Joe Nemechek	MB2 Motorsports	Chevrolet	254	134
11	2	6	Mark Martin	Roush Racing	Ford	254	135^{1}
12	3	97	Kurt Busch	Roush Racing	Ford	254	132^{1}
13	19	15	Michael Waltrip	Dale Earnhardt, Inc.	Chevrolet	254	129^{1}
14	18	29	Kevin Harvick	Richard Childress Racing	Chevrolet	254	121
15	34	2	Rusty Wallace	Penske Racing	Dodge	254	118
16	5	48	Jimmie Johnson	Hendrick Motorsports	Chevrolet	254	115
17	15	38	Elliott Sadler	Robert Yates Racing	Ford	254	112
18	28	12	Ryan Newman	Penske Racing	Dodge	254	109
19	12	40	Sterling Marlin	Chip Ganassi Racing	Dodge	254	106
20	42	18	Bobby Labonte	Joe Gibbs Racing	Chevrolet	254	103
21	6	24	Jeff Gordon	Hendrick Motorsports	Chevrolet	254	100
22	21	07	Dave Blaney	Richard Childress Racing	Chevrolet	254	97
23	11	32	Bobby Hamilton Jr.	PPI Motorsports	Chevrolet	254	94
24	37	88	Dale Jarrett	Robert Yates Racing	Ford	254	91
25	17	43	Jeff Green	Petty Enterprises	Dodge	254	93^{1}
26	13	19	Jeremy Mayfield	Evernham Motorsports	Dodge	254	90^{1}
27	38	0	Mike Bliss	Haas Automation	Chevrolet	254	82
28	32	37	Tony Raines	R&J Racing	Dodge	254	79
29	31	49	Ken Schrader	BAM Racing	Dodge	253	76
30	26	36	Boris Said	MB/Sutton Motorsports	Chevrolet	253	73
31	27	22	Scott Wimmer	Bill Davis Racing	Dodge	250	70
32	33	41	Casey Mears	Chip Ganassi Racing	Dodge	249	67
33	29	77	Travis Kvapil	Penske Racing	Dodge	249	64
34	24	7	Robby Gordon	Robby Gordon Motorsports	Chevrolet	248	66^{1}
35	16	31	Jeff Burton	Richard Childress Racing	Chevrolet	248	58
36	10	10	Scott Riggs	Evernham Motorsports	Chevrolet	246	55
37	36	66	Mike Garvey	Peak Performance Motorsports	Ford	232	52
38	41	8	Dale Earnhardt Jr.	Dale Earnhardt, Inc.	Chevrolet	211	54^{1}
39	8	11	J. J. Yeley	Joe Gibbs Racing	Chevrolet	209	46
40	30	91	Bill Elliott	Evernham Motorsports	Dodge	180	43
41	20	45	Kyle Petty	Petty Enterprises	Dodge	171	40
42	43	92	Hermie Sadler	Front Row Motorsports	Dodge	87	37
43	35	51	Stuart Kirby	Competitive Edge Motorsports	Chevrolet	31	34
^{1} Includes five bonus points for leading a lap^{2} Includes ten bonus points for leading the most laps

== Standings after the race ==
Drivers' Championship standings

Pos	+/–	Driver	Points
1		Tony Stewart	3,570
2	1	Greg Biffle	3,361 (−209)
3	1	Jimmie Johnson	3,312 (−258)
4		Rusty Wallace	3,257 (−313)
5		Mark Martin	3,149 (−421)
6	1	Kurt Busch	3,114 (−456)
7	1	Jeremy Mayfield	3,073 (−497)
8		Carl Edwards	3,014 (−556)
9	2	Matt Kenseth	2,939 (−631)
10	2	Jamie McMurray	2,929 (−641)

Owners' Championship standings

Pos	+/–	Owner	No.	Points
1		Joe Gibbs	20	3,570
2	1	Geoff Smith	16	3,361 (−209)
3	1	Jeff Gordon	48	3,312 (−258)
4		Roger Penske	2	3,257 (−313)
5		Jack Roush	6	3,149 (−421)
6	1	Georgetta Roush	97	3,114 (−456)
7	1	Ray Evernham	19	3,073 (−497)
8		Jack Roush	99	3,014 (−556)
9	2	Mark Martin	17	2,939 (−631)
10	2	Floyd Ganassi	42	2,929 (−641)

Manufacturers' Championship standings

Pos	+/–	Manufacturer	Points
1		Chevrolet	185
2		Ford	166 (−19)
3		Dodge	124 (−61)

- Note: Only the top ten positions are included for the driver and owner standings.

== Notes and references ==
=== References ===
Previous race: 2005 Sharpie 500	Nextel Cup Series; 2005 season	Next race: 2005 Chevy Rock & Roll 400
