= 2004 UAW-GM Quality 500 =

Race details
- Race 31 of 36 in the 2004 NASCAR Nextel Cup Series
- The 2004 UAW-GM Quality 500 program cover, with artwork by NASCAR artist Sam Bass. The painting is called "Title Fight!"
- Date: October 16, 2004
- Official name: 45th Annual UAW-GM Quality 500
- Location: Concord, North Carolina, Lowe's Motor Speedway
- Course: Permanent racing facility
- Course length: 1.5 miles (2.41 km)
- Distance: 334 laps, 501 mi (806.281 km)
- Scheduled distance: 334 laps, 501 mi (806.281 km)
- Average speed: 130.214 miles per hour (209.559 km/h)
- Attendance: 140,000

Pole position
Driver	Ryan Newman	Penske-Jasper Racing
- Time: 28.590

Most laps led
Driver	Kasey Kahne	Evernham Motorsports
- Laps: 207

Winner
No. 48	Jimmie Johnson	Hendrick Motorsports

Television in the United States
- Network: NBC
- Announcers: Allen Bestwick, Benny Parsons, Wally Dallenbach Jr.

Radio in the United States
- Radio: Performance Racing Network

The 2004 UAW-GM Quality 500 was the 31st stock car race of the 2004 NASCAR Nextel Cup Series season, the fifth race of the 2004 Chase for the Nextel Cup, and the 45th iteration of the event. The race was on Saturday, October 16, 2004, before a crowd of 140,000 in Concord, North Carolina, at Lowe's Motor Speedway, a 1.5 miles (2.4 km) permanent quad-oval. The race took the scheduled 334 laps to complete. At the race's end, Jimmie Johnson of Hendrick Motorsports would take advantage of Kasey Kahne's bad luck at the end of the race, holding off the field on the final restart to win his 11th career NASCAR Nextel Cup Series win and his third of the season. To fill out the podium, Jeff Gordon of Hendrick Motorsports and Dale Earnhardt Jr. of Dale Earnhardt, Inc. would finish second and third, respectively.

== Background ==
The layout of Lowe's Motor Speedway, the venue where the race was held.

Lowe's Motor Speedway is a motorsports complex located in Concord, North Carolina, United States 13 miles from Charlotte, North Carolina. The complex features a 1.5 miles (2.4 km) quad oval track that hosts NASCAR racing including the prestigious Coca-Cola 600 on Memorial Day weekend and the NEXTEL All-Star Challenge, as well as the UAW-GM Quality 500. The speedway was built in 1959 by Bruton Smith and is considered the home track for NASCAR with many race teams located in the Charlotte area. The track is owned and operated by Speedway Motorsports Inc. (SMI) with Marcus G. Smith (son of Bruton Smith) as track president.

=== Entry list ===
#	Driver	Team	Make
0	Ward Burton	Haas CNC Racing	Chevrolet
00	Kenny Wallace	Michael Waltrip Racing	Chevrolet
01	Joe Nemechek	MBV Motorsports	Chevrolet
2	Rusty Wallace	Penske-Jasper Racing	Dodge
02	Hermie Sadler	SCORE Motorsports	Chevrolet
4	Jimmy Spencer	Morgan–McClure Motorsports	Chevrolet
5	Terry Labonte	Hendrick Motorsports	Chevrolet
6	Mark Martin	Roush Racing	Ford
8	Dale Earnhardt Jr.	Dale Earnhardt, Inc.	Chevrolet
08	Carl Long	McGlynn Racing	Chevrolet
9	Kasey Kahne	Evernham Motorsports	Dodge
09	Johnny Sauter	Phoenix Racing	Dodge
10	Scott Riggs	MBV Motorsports	Chevrolet
12	Ryan Newman	Penske-Jasper Racing	Dodge
13	Greg Sacks	Sacks Motorsports	Dodge
14	John Andretti	ppc Racing	Ford
15	Michael Waltrip	Dale Earnhardt, Inc.	Chevrolet
16	Greg Biffle	Roush Racing	Ford
17	Matt Kenseth	Roush Racing	Ford
18	Bobby Labonte	Joe Gibbs Racing	Chevrolet
19	Jeremy Mayfield	Evernham Motorsports	Dodge
20	Tony Stewart	Joe Gibbs Racing	Chevrolet
21	Ricky Rudd	Wood Brothers Racing	Ford
22	Scott Wimmer	Bill Davis Racing	Dodge
24	Jeff Gordon	Hendrick Motorsports	Chevrolet
25	Brian Vickers	Hendrick Motorsports	Chevrolet
29	Kevin Harvick	Richard Childress Racing	Chevrolet
30	Jeff Burton	Richard Childress Racing	Chevrolet
31	Robby Gordon	Richard Childress Racing	Chevrolet
32	Bobby Hamilton Jr.	PPI Motorsports	Chevrolet
35	Mike Wallace	Gary Keller Racing	Chevrolet
37	Kevin Lepage	R&J Racing	Dodge
38	Elliott Sadler	Robert Yates Racing	Ford
40	Sterling Marlin	Chip Ganassi Racing	Dodge
41	Casey Mears	Chip Ganassi Racing	Dodge
42	Jamie McMurray	Chip Ganassi Racing	Dodge
43	Jeff Green	Petty Enterprises	Dodge
45	Kyle Petty	Petty Enterprises	Dodge
48	Jimmie Johnson	Hendrick Motorsports	Chevrolet
49	Ken Schrader	BAM Racing	Dodge
50	Jeff Fuller	Arnold Motorsports	Dodge
51	Tony Raines	Competitive Edge Motorsports	Chevrolet
59	Larry Foyt	BAM Racing	Dodge
62	Damon Lusk*	Hollenbeck Motorsports	Chevrolet
72	Kirk Shelmerdine	Kirk Shelmerdine Racing	Ford
77	Brendan Gaughan	Penske-Jasper Racing	Dodge
84	Kyle Busch	Hendrick Motorsports	Chevrolet
88	Dale Jarrett	Robert Yates Racing	Ford
89	Morgan Shepherd	Shepherd Racing Ventures	Dodge
92	Derrike Cope**	Front Row Motorsports	Dodge
94	Stanton Barrett**	W. W. Motorsports	Dodge
97	Kurt Busch	Roush Racing	Ford
98	Geoff Bodine	Mach 1 Motorsports	Ford
99	Carl Edwards***	Roush Racing	Ford
Official entry list

*Withdrew.

**Barrett was originally tapped to drive the #94, and Cope to drive the #92. However, the #92 team would withdraw, and Cope would move to the #94.

***Edwards drove in pre-race activities, but would not start the car on Saturday due to a NASCAR Craftsman Truck Series race he attended on the same day going late. As a result, backup driver Dave Blaney would start for Edwards, and Edwards would get in the car on lap 24. As Blaney had started the race, Blaney was credited with the finish.

== Practice ==
=== First practice ===
The first practice session was held on Thursday, October 14, at 2:20 PM EST, and would last for 2 hours. Ryan Newman of Penske-Jasper Racing would set the fastest time in the session, with a lap of 28.870 and an average speed of 187.045 miles per hour (301.020 km/h).

Pos.	#	Driver	Team	Make	Time	Speed
1	12	Ryan Newman	Penske-Jasper Racing	Dodge	28.870	187.045
2	97	Kurt Busch	Roush Racing	Ford	28.967	186.419
3	38	Elliott Sadler	Robert Yates Racing	Ford	29.037	185.970
Full first practice results

=== Second practice ===
The second practice session was held on Friday, October 15, at 4:30 PM EST, and would last for 45 minutes. Mark Martin of Roush Racing would set the fastest time in the session, with a lap of 29.710 and an average speed of 181.757 miles per hour (292.510 km/h).

Pos.	#	Driver	Team	Make	Time	Speed
1	6	Mark Martin	Roush Racing	Ford	29.710	181.757
2	9	Kasey Kahne	Evernham Motorsports	Dodge	29.729	181.641
3	99	Carl Edwards	Roush Racing	Ford	29.732	181.622
Full second practice results

=== Third and final practice ===
The third and final practice session, sometimes referred to as Happy Hour, was held on Friday, October 15, at 6:10 PM EST, and would last for 45 minutes. Elliott Sadler of Robert Yates Racing would set the fastest time in the session, with a lap of 29.710 and an average speed of 181.757 miles per hour (292.510 km/h).

Pos.	#	Driver	Team	Make	Time	Speed
1	38	Elliott Sadler	Robert Yates Racing	Ford	29.662	182.051
2	2	Rusty Wallace	Penske-Jasper Racing	Dodge	29.722	181.684
3	48	Jimmie Johnson	Hendrick Motorsports	Chevrolet	29.731	181.629
Full Happy Hour practice results

== Qualifying ==
Qualifying was held on Thursday, October 14, at 7:10 PM EST. Each driver would have two laps to set a fastest time; the fastest of the two would count as their official qualifying lap. Positions 1-38 would be decided on time, while positions 39-43 would be based on provisionals. Four spots are awarded by the use of provisionals based on owner's points. The fifth is awarded to a past champion who has not otherwise qualified for the race. If no past champ needs the provisional, the next team in the owner points will be awarded a provisional.

Ryan Newman of Penske-Jasper Racing would win the pole, setting a time of 28.590 and an average speed of 188.877 miles per hour (303.968 km/h), setting a new track record.

Nine drivers would fail to qualify: Kenny Wallace, Derrike Cope, Mike Wallace, Carl Long, Kirk Shelmerdine, Larry Foyt, Hermie Sadler, Morgan Shepherd, and Geoff Bodine.

=== Full qualifying results ===
Pos.	#	Driver	Team	Make	Time	Speed
1	12	Ryan Newman	Penske-Jasper Racing	Dodge	28.590	188.877
2	9	Kasey Kahne	Evernham Motorsports	Dodge	28.829	187.311
3	41	Casey Mears	Chip Ganassi Racing	Dodge	28.834	187.279
4	10	Scott Riggs	MBV Motorsports	Chevrolet	28.957	186.483
5	38	Elliott Sadler	Robert Yates Racing	Ford	28.996	186.233
6	15	Michael Waltrip	Dale Earnhardt, Inc.	Chevrolet	28.997	186.226
7	29	Kevin Harvick	Richard Childress Racing	Chevrolet	29.010	186.143
8	01	Joe Nemechek	MBV Motorsports	Chevrolet	29.022	186.066
9	48	Jimmie Johnson	Hendrick Motorsports	Chevrolet	29.237	184.697
10	99	Carl Edwards	Roush Racing	Ford	29.036	185.976
11	32	Bobby Hamilton Jr.	PPI Motorsports	Chevrolet	29.039	185.957
12	6	Mark Martin	Roush Racing	Ford	29.139	185.319
13	19	Jeremy Mayfield	Evernham Motorsports	Dodge	29.146	185.274
14	2	Rusty Wallace	Penske-Jasper Racing	Dodge	29.154	185.223
15	20	Tony Stewart	Joe Gibbs Racing	Chevrolet	29.170	185.122
16	77	Brendan Gaughan	Penske-Jasper Racing	Dodge	29.192	184.982
17	25	Brian Vickers	Hendrick Motorsports	Chevrolet	29.213	184.849
18	16	Greg Biffle	Roush Racing	Ford	29.215	184.837
19	31	Robby Gordon	Richard Childress Racing	Chevrolet	29.241	184.672
20	14	John Andretti	ppc Racing	Ford	29.250	184.615
21	97	Kurt Busch	Roush Racing	Ford	29.264	184.527
22	4	Jimmy Spencer	Morgan–McClure Motorsports	Chevrolet	29.268	184.502
23	24	Jeff Gordon	Hendrick Motorsports	Chevrolet	29.289	184.370
24	42	Jamie McMurray	Chip Ganassi Racing	Dodge	29.300	184.300
25	8	Dale Earnhardt Jr.	Dale Earnhardt, Inc.	Chevrolet	29.339	184.055
26	50	Jeff Fuller	Arnold Motorsports	Dodge	29.431	183.480
27	37	Kevin Lepage	R&J Racing	Dodge	29.452	183.349
28	51	Tony Raines	Competitive Edge Motorsports	Chevrolet	29.458	183.312
29	09	Johnny Sauter	Phoenix Racing	Dodge	29.470	183.237
30	49	Ken Schrader	BAM Racing	Dodge	29.472	183.225
31	40	Sterling Marlin	Chip Ganassi Racing	Dodge	29.482	183.163
32	45	Kyle Petty	Petty Enterprises	Dodge	29.497	183.070
33	43	Jeff Green	Petty Enterprises	Dodge	29.500	183.051
34	18	Bobby Labonte	Joe Gibbs Racing	Chevrolet	29.506	183.014
35	30	Jeff Burton	Richard Childress Racing	Chevrolet	29.515	182.958
36	17	Matt Kenseth	Roush Racing	Ford	29.604	182.408
37	13	Greg Sacks	Sacks Motorsports	Dodge	29.628	182.260
38	84	Kyle Busch	Hendrick Motorsports	Chevrolet	29.629	182.254
Provisionals
39	88	Dale Jarrett	Robert Yates Racing	Ford	29.763	181.433
40	5	Terry Labonte	Hendrick Motorsports	Chevrolet	29.704	181.794
41	21	Ricky Rudd	Wood Brothers Racing	Ford	29.756	181.476
42	22	Scott Wimmer	Bill Davis Racing	Dodge	29.845	180.935
43	0	Ward Burton	Haas CNC Racing	Chevrolet	29.631	182.242
Failed to qualify or withdrew
44	00	Kenny Wallace	Michael Waltrip Racing	Chevrolet	29.732	181.622
45	94	Derrike Cope	W. W. Motorsports	Dodge	29.807	181.165
46	35	Mike Wallace	Gary Keller Racing	Chevrolet	29.868	180.796
47	08	Carl Long	McGlynn Racing	Chevrolet	29.885	180.693
48	72	Kirk Shelmerdine	Kirk Shelmerdine Racing	Ford	30.230	178.630
49	59	Larry Foyt	BAM Racing	Dodge	30.382	177.737
50	02	Hermie Sadler	SCORE Motorsports	Chevrolet	30.483	177.148
51	89	Morgan Shepherd	Shepherd Racing Ventures	Dodge	30.498	177.061
52	98	Geoff Bodine	Mach 1 Motorsports	Ford	30.615	176.384
WD	62	Damon Lusk	Hollenbeck Motorsports	Chevrolet	—	—
WD	92	Derrike Cope	Front Row Motorsports	Dodge	—	—
Official qualifying results

== Race ==
On the first lap of the race, a multi-car crash occurred in turn 1. It started when the 4th place start car in Scott Riggs when his car did not get up to speed going into turn 1. Riggs went up the track to move out of the way but Greg Biffle all of a sudden got hit from behind by John Andretti collecting Kurt Busch, Jeff Gordon, Tony Raines, and Ken Schrader. Pole sitter Ryan Newman led the first lap of the race. The race got back going on lap 8 but the caution would be immeadeatly be thrown again when Jeff Fuller blew a tire and hit the wall in turn 1. The race got back going on lap 13 with Newman still leading and got some green flag laps. On lap 23, the third caution flew when Brian Vickers crashed hard on the front stretch after contact with Robby Gordon. The race would be red flagged for a short period of time to repair the outside SAFER barrier on the front stretch. During the caution, Dave Blaney was taken out of the #99 and Carl Edwards jumped in. After the red flag was lifted, Elliott Sadler won the race off of pit road and led the field to the restart on lap 31. On lap 42, Kasey Kahne took the lead on Sadler. On lap 76, the fourth caution flew when Jeff Gordon spun off of turn 4 and got hit again by Rusty Wallace. Kahne won the race off of pit road and lead the field to the restart on lap 81. The fifth caution would fly on lap 120 for debris. Kahne won the race off of pit road and lead on the restart on lap 125. Kahne would be passed by Dale Earnhardt Jr. for the lead. On lap 130, Kahne took the lead back. On lap 172, the 6th caution flew when Matt Kenseth blew a tire and hit the wall. Kahne won the race off of pit road and lead the field to green on lap 177. Dale Earnhardt Jr. took the lead from Kahne on the restart. On lap 180, Jimmie Johnson took the lead from Jr. On lap 187, Kasey Kahne took the lead back. On lap 210, the 7th caution flew for debris. Kahne lead the field on lap 215 for the restart. On the next lap, Mark Martin took the lead. Kahne took it back on lap 220. On lap 223, the 8th caution flew when Kevin Harvick's engine blew and laid fluid. It also caused other drivers to spin like Matt Kenseth, Jeremy Mayfield, and Carl Edwards where Edwards crashed out. Race restarted on lap 232 with Kasey Kahne leading.

=== Final Laps ===
Kahne had the most dominant performance he had during his whole rookie season. Kahne was looking for his first win in his 31st start while being the first rookie to win in the Cup Series since Jimmie Johnson in 2002 and Kahne had the car to win. Unfortunetly for Kahne, his bad luck would continue. On lap 268 of the race, Kahne was leading when he went into turn 1 when all of a sudden the right front tire on his car went flat and the car shot up the race track and hit the outside wall in turn 2. This would end Kahne's race. Kahne had one of the worst ways to lose a race after having his most dominant performance of the season after he led a race high 207 laps of the race before he crashed out of the race while leading. While Kahne wrecked, Kyle Busch and Sterling Marlin both wrecked in turn 4. Mark Martin won the race off of pit road and was the new race leader. Martin lead the field to the green on lap 273. On lap 278, Kurt Busch would take the lead. Mark Martin would take it back on lap 281. With 33 laps to go, Jimmie Johnson took the lead from Martin. With 23 to go, the 10th caution would fly for a three car crash when Brendan Gaughan's car slowed down and would be run into from behind by Jimmy Spencer which also collected Mark Martin giving Martin damage. Martin's car would be able to come back and finish the race. Joe Nemechek lead with 17 to go on the restart but was quickly passed by Johnson. With 16 to go, the 11th and final caution flew when Michael Waltrip's car slid up and hit the wall. The race restarted with 12 laps to go and Johnson held onto the lead and won the race picking up his 5th win of the season. This would be the first of three wins in a row for Johnson. Jeff Gordon, Dale Earnhardt Jr, Kurt Busch, and Joe Nemechek rounded out the top 5 while Dale Jarrett, Elliott Sadler, Jamie McMurray, Jeff Burton, and Tony Stewart rounded out the top 10.

== Race results ==
Fin	St	#	Driver	Team	Make	Laps	Led	Status	Pts	Winnings
1	9	48	Jimmie Johnson	Hendrick Motorsports	Chevrolet	334	35	running	185	$191,450
2	23	24	Jeff Gordon	Hendrick Motorsports	Chevrolet	334	0	running	170	$161,678
3	25	8	Dale Earnhardt Jr.	Dale Earnhardt, Inc.	Chevrolet	334	8	running	170	$155,928
4	21	97	Kurt Busch	Roush Racing	Ford	334	3	running	165	$110,250
5	8	01	Joe Nemechek	MBV Motorsports	Chevrolet	334	4	running	160	$112,750
6	39	88	Dale Jarrett	Robert Yates Racing	Ford	334	0	running	150	$113,992
7	5	38	Elliott Sadler	Robert Yates Racing	Ford	334	13	running	151	$112,158
8	24	42	Jamie McMurray	Chip Ganassi Racing	Dodge	334	0	running	142	$80,625
9	35	30	Jeff Burton	Richard Childress Racing	Chevrolet	334	0	running	138	$77,700
10	15	20	Tony Stewart	Joe Gibbs Racing	Chevrolet	334	0	running	134	$113,903
11	36	17	Matt Kenseth	Roush Racing	Ford	334	0	running	130	$113,803
12	31	40	Sterling Marlin	Chip Ganassi Racing	Dodge	334	1	running	132	$100,525
13	12	6	Mark Martin	Roush Racing	Ford	334	32	running	129	$74,500
14	1	12	Ryan Newman	Penske-Jasper Racing	Dodge	334	31	running	126	$136,117
15	11	32	Bobby Hamilton Jr.	PPI Motorsports	Chevrolet	333	0	running	118	$88,150
16	41	21	Ricky Rudd	Wood Brothers Racing	Ford	332	0	running	115	$89,006
17	34	18	Bobby Labonte	Joe Gibbs Racing	Chevrolet	332	0	running	112	$103,483
18	19	31	Robby Gordon	Richard Childress Racing	Chevrolet	332	0	running	109	$93,137
19	43	0	Ward Burton	Haas CNC Racing	Chevrolet	331	0	running	106	$61,350
20	3	41	Casey Mears	Chip Ganassi Racing	Dodge	331	0	running	103	$79,400
21	30	49	Ken Schrader	BAM Racing	Dodge	331	0	running	100	$60,550
22	20	14	John Andretti	ppc Racing	Ford	330	0	running	97	$56,675
23	16	77	Brendan Gaughan	Penske-Jasper Racing	Dodge	329	0	running	94	$69,375
24	29	09	Johnny Sauter	Phoenix Racing	Dodge	329	0	running	91	$60,455
25	40	5	Terry Labonte	Hendrick Motorsports	Chevrolet	328	0	running	88	$86,325
26	42	22	Scott Wimmer	Bill Davis Racing	Dodge	327	0	running	85	$77,375
27	32	45	Kyle Petty	Petty Enterprises	Dodge	326	0	running	82	$66,934
28	6	15	Michael Waltrip	Dale Earnhardt, Inc.	Chevrolet	319	0	crash	79	$91,991
29	22	4	Jimmy Spencer	Morgan–McClure Motorsports	Chevrolet	310	0	crash	76	$58,050
30	13	19	Jeremy Mayfield	Evernham Motorsports	Dodge	277	0	crash	73	$66,425
31	14	2	Rusty Wallace	Penske-Jasper Racing	Dodge	274	0	running	70	$98,633
32	2	9	Kasey Kahne	Evernham Motorsports	Dodge	267	207	crash	77	$133,050
33	18	16	Greg Biffle	Roush Racing	Ford	265	0	running	64	$63,550
34	38	84	Kyle Busch	Hendrick Motorsports	Chevrolet	264	0	crash	61	$54,575
35	33	43	Jeff Green	Petty Enterprises	Dodge	238	0	engine	58	$80,750
36	7	29	Kevin Harvick	Richard Childress Racing	Chevrolet	221	0	engine	55	$90,793
37	10	99	Carl Edwards	Roush Racing	Ford	218	0	crash	52	$88,087
38	4	10	Scott Riggs	MBV Motorsports	Chevrolet	30	0	engine	49	$82,022
39	27	37	Kevin Lepage	R&J Racing	Dodge	25	0	ignition	46	$54,290
40	17	25	Brian Vickers	Hendrick Motorsports	Chevrolet	23	0	crash	43	$62,255
41	37	13	Greg Sacks	Sacks Motorsports	Dodge	10	0	crash	40	$54,220
42	26	50	Jeff Fuller	Arnold Motorsports	Dodge	7	0	crash	37	$54,180
43	28	51	Tony Raines	Competitive Edge Motorsports	Chevrolet	1	0	crash	34	$53,499
Official race results

Previous race: 2004 Banquet 400	NASCAR Nextel Cup Series; 2004 season	Next race: 2004 Subway 500
