= 2004 GFS Marketplace 400 =

Race details
- Race 23 of 36 in the 2004 NASCAR Nextel Cup Series
- The 2004 GFS Marketplace 400 program cover, featuring Ryan Newman's car and the Justice League.
- Date: August 22, 2004
- Official name: 35th Annual GFS Marketplace 400
- Location: Brooklyn, Michigan, Michigan International Speedway
- Course: Permanent racing facility
- Course length: 2 miles (3.2 km)
- Distance: 200 laps, 400 mi (643.737 km)
- Scheduled distance: 200 laps, 400 mi (643.737 km)
- Average speed: 139.063 miles per hour (223.800 km/h)
- Attendance: 160,000

Pole position
Driver	Jimmie Johnson	Hendrick Motorsports
- Time: Set by 2004 owner's points

Most laps led
Driver	Greg Biffle	Roush Racing
- Laps: 73

Winner
No. 16	Greg Biffle	Roush Racing

Television in the United States
- Network: TNT
- Announcers: Allen Bestwick, Benny Parsons, Wally Dallenbach Jr.

Radio in the United States
- Radio: Motor Racing Network

The 2004 GFS Marketplace 400 was the 23rd stock car race of the 2004 NASCAR Nextel Cup Series season and the 35th iteration of the event. The race was held on Sunday, August 22, 2004, before a crowd of 160,000 in Brooklyn, Michigan at Michigan International Speedway, a two-mile (3.2 km) permanent moderate-banked D-shaped speedway. The race took the scheduled 200 laps to complete. At race's end, Greg Biffle of Roush Racing would run away with the race, passing teammate Mark Martin to win his second career NASCAR Nextel Cup Series win and his first of the season. To fill out the podium, Dale Jarrett of Robert Yates Racing would finish third. As part of a promotional partnership between Mattel, NASCAR, and DC Comics, characters from the Justice League animated series were featured on the paint schemes of the cars driven by six drivers during the race weekend including Greg Biffle, Kurt Busch, Mark Martin, Ricky Rudd, Ryan Newman, and Carl Edwards. Jeff Burton was initially confirmed to run this race for Roush Racing but on August 12, 2004, he abruptly announced his departure from the team and signed with Richard Childress Racing to drive the #30 car beginning with this race.

== Background ==
The layout of Michigan International Speedway, the venue where the race was held.

The race was held at Michigan International Speedway, a two-mile (3.2 km) moderate-banked D-shaped speedway located in Brooklyn, Michigan. The track is used primarily for NASCAR events. It is known as a "sister track" to Texas World Speedway as MIS's oval design was a direct basis of TWS, with moderate modifications to the banking in the corners, and was used as the basis of Auto Club Speedway. The track is owned by International Speedway Corporation. Michigan International Speedway is recognized as one of motorsports' premier facilities because of its wide racing surface and high banking (by open-wheel standards; the 18-degree banking is modest by stock car standards).

=== Entry list ===
#	Driver	Team	Make
0	Ward Burton	Haas CNC Racing	Chevrolet
00	Kenny Wallace	Michael Waltrip Racing	Chevrolet
01	Joe Nemechek	MBV Motorsports	Chevrolet
2	Rusty Wallace	Penske-Jasper Racing	Dodge
02	Hermie Sadler	SCORE Motorsports	Chevrolet
4	Jimmy Spencer	Morgan–McClure Motorsports	Chevrolet
5	Terry Labonte	Hendrick Motorsports	Chevrolet
6	Mark Martin	Roush Racing	Ford
8	Dale Earnhardt Jr.	Dale Earnhardt, Inc.	Chevrolet
9	Kasey Kahne	Evernham Motorsports	Dodge
09	Bobby Hamilton Jr.	Phoenix Racing	Dodge
10	Scott Riggs	MBV Motorsports	Chevrolet
11	J. J. Yeley	Joe Gibbs Racing	Chevrolet
12	Ryan Newman	Penske-Jasper Racing	Dodge
13	Greg Sacks*	Sacks Motorsports	Dodge
15	Michael Waltrip	Dale Earnhardt, Inc.	Chevrolet
16	Greg Biffle	Roush Racing	Ford
17	Matt Kenseth	Roush Racing	Ford
18	Bobby Labonte	Joe Gibbs Racing	Chevrolet
19	Jeremy Mayfield	Evernham Motorsports	Dodge
20	Tony Stewart	Joe Gibbs Racing	Chevrolet
21	Ricky Rudd	Wood Brothers Racing	Ford
22	Scott Wimmer	Bill Davis Racing	Dodge
24	Jeff Gordon	Hendrick Motorsports	Chevrolet
25	Brian Vickers	Hendrick Motorsports	Chevrolet
29	Kevin Harvick	Richard Childress Racing	Chevrolet
30	Jeff Burton	Richard Childress Racing	Chevrolet
31	Robby Gordon	Richard Childress Racing	Chevrolet
32	Ricky Craven	PPI Motorsports	Chevrolet
33	Kerry Earnhardt	Richard Childress Racing	Chevrolet
35	Mike Wallace	Gary Keller Racing	Chevrolet
37	Stanton Barrett	R&J Racing	Dodge
38	Elliott Sadler	Robert Yates Racing	Ford
40	Sterling Marlin	Chip Ganassi Racing	Dodge
41	Casey Mears	Chip Ganassi Racing	Dodge
42	Jamie McMurray	Chip Ganassi Racing	Dodge
43	Jeff Green	Petty Enterprises	Dodge
45	Kyle Petty	Petty Enterprises	Dodge
48	Jimmie Johnson	Hendrick Motorsports	Chevrolet
49	Ken Schrader	BAM Racing	Dodge
50	Todd Bodine	Arnold Motorsports	Dodge
51	Kevin Lepage	Competitive Edge Motorsports	Chevrolet
62	Larry Hollenbeck	Hollenbeck Motorsports	Chevrolet
72	Kirk Shelmerdine	Kirk Shelmerdine Racing	Ford
75	Mike Garvey*	Haefele Racing	Dodge
77	Brendan Gaughan	Penske-Jasper Racing	Dodge
79	Stan Boyd	Conely Racing	Chevrolet
80	Carl Long	Hover Motorsports	Ford
84	Kyle Busch	Hendrick Motorsports	Chevrolet
88	Dale Jarrett	Robert Yates Racing	Ford
89	Morgan Shepherd	Shepherd Racing Ventures	Dodge
97	Kurt Busch	Roush Racing	Ford
98	Derrike Cope	Mach 1 Motorsports	Ford
99	Carl Edwards	Roush Racing	Ford
Official entry list

*Withdrew.

== Practice ==
=== First practice ===
The first practice session was originally scheduled to be held on Friday, August 20, at 11:00 AM EST, and would have lasted for an hour and 50 minutes. However, rain would delay the session for over an hour, and afterwards, only 48 minutes of the session were run. Jeremy Mayfield of Evernham Motorsports would set the fastest time in the session, with a lap of 37.352 and an average speed of 192.761 miles per hour (310.219 km/h).

Pos.	#	Driver	Team	Make	Time	Speed
1	19	Jeremy Mayfield	Evernham Motorsports	Dodge	37.352	192.761
2	2	Rusty Wallace	Penske-Jasper Racing	Dodge	37.671	191.128
3	38	Elliott Sadler	Robert Yates Racing	Ford	37.679	191.088
Full first practice results

=== Second practice ===
The second practice session would occur on Saturday, August 21, at 9:30 AM EST and would last for 45 minutes. Jimmie Johnson of Hendrick Motorsports would set the fastest time in the session, with a lap of 29.209 and an average speed of 130.398 miles per hour (209.855 km/h).

Pos.	#	Driver	Team	Make	Time	Speed
1	48	Jimmie Johnson	Hendrick Motorsports	Chevrolet	38.199	188.487
2	19	Jeremy Mayfield	Evernham Motorsports	Dodge	38.218	188.393
3	25	Brian Vickers	Hendrick Motorsports	Chevrolet	38.238	188.294
Full second practice results

=== Third and final practice ===
The third and final practice session, sometimes referred to as Happy Hour, would occur on Saturday, August 21, at 11:10 AM EST and would last for 45 minutes. Elliott Sadler of Robert Yates Racing would set the fastest time in the session, with a lap of 29.209 and an average speed of 130.398 miles per hour (209.855 km/h).

Pos.	#	Driver	Team	Make	Time	Speed
1	38	Elliott Sadler	Robert Yates Racing	Ford	38.392	187.539
2	9	Kasey Kahne	Evernham Motorsports	Dodge	38.442	187.295
3	2	Rusty Wallace	Penske-Jasper Racing	Dodge	38.457	187.222
Full Happy Hour practice results

== Starting lineup ==
Qualifying was originally scheduled to occur on Friday, August 20, at 3:10 PM EST. However, rain on Friday would cancel qualifying, making the lineup based on the current 2004 owner's points. As a result, Jimmie Johnson of Hendrick Motorsports would win the pole.

Nine drivers would fail to qualify: Kevin Lepage, Stanton Barrett, Kerry Earnhardt, Kyle Busch, Kenny Wallace, Larry Hollenbeck, J. J. Yeley, Mike Wallace, and Stan Boyd.

=== Full qualifying results ===
Pos.	#	Driver	Team	Make
1	48	Jimmie Johnson	Hendrick Motorsports	Chevrolet
2	24	Jeff Gordon	Hendrick Motorsports	Chevrolet
3	8	Dale Earnhardt Jr.	Dale Earnhardt, Inc.	Chevrolet
4	20	Tony Stewart	Joe Gibbs Racing	Chevrolet
5	17	Matt Kenseth	Roush Racing	Ford
6	38	Elliott Sadler	Robert Yates Racing	Ford
7	97	Kurt Busch	Roush Racing	Ford
8	29	Kevin Harvick	Richard Childress Racing	Chevrolet
9	18	Bobby Labonte	Joe Gibbs Racing	Chevrolet
10	19	Jeremy Mayfield	Evernham Motorsports	Dodge
11	9	Kasey Kahne	Evernham Motorsports	Dodge
12	12	Ryan Newman	Penske-Jasper Racing	Dodge
13	6	Mark Martin	Roush Racing	Ford
14	88	Dale Jarrett	Robert Yates Racing	Ford
15	42	Jamie McMurray	Chip Ganassi Racing	Dodge
16	41	Casey Mears	Chip Ganassi Racing	Dodge
17	15	Michael Waltrip	Dale Earnhardt, Inc.	Chevrolet
18	2	Rusty Wallace	Penske-Jasper Racing	Dodge
19	31	Robby Gordon	Richard Childress Racing	Chevrolet
20	40	Sterling Marlin	Chip Ganassi Racing	Dodge
21	5	Terry Labonte	Hendrick Motorsports	Chevrolet
22	25	Brian Vickers	Hendrick Motorsports	Chevrolet
23	99	Carl Edwards	Roush Racing	Ford
24	16	Greg Biffle	Roush Racing	Ford
25	01	Joe Nemechek	MBV Motorsports	Chevrolet
26	22	Scott Wimmer	Bill Davis Racing	Dodge
27	21	Ricky Rudd	Wood Brothers Racing	Ford
28	30	Jeff Burton	Richard Childress Racing	Chevrolet
29	0	Ward Burton	Haas CNC Racing	Chevrolet
30	77	Brendan Gaughan	Penske-Jasper Racing	Dodge
31	10	Scott Riggs	MBV Motorsports	Chevrolet
32	45	Kyle Petty	Petty Enterprises	Dodge
33	49	Ken Schrader	BAM Racing	Dodge
34	43	Jeff Green	Petty Enterprises	Dodge
35	32	Ricky Craven	PPI Motorsports	Chevrolet
36	50	Todd Bodine	Arnold Motorsports	Dodge
37	72	Kirk Shelmerdine	Kirk Shelmerdine Racing	Ford
38	4	Jimmy Spencer	Morgan–McClure Motorsports	Chevrolet
39	98	Derrike Cope	Mach 1 Motorsports	Ford
40	89	Morgan Shepherd	Shepherd Racing Ventures	Dodge
41	09	Bobby Hamilton Jr.	Phoenix Racing	Dodge
42	02	Hermie Sadler	SCORE Motorsports	Chevrolet
43	80	Carl Long	Hover Motorsports	Ford
Failed to qualify or withdrew
44	51	Kevin Lepage	Competitive Edge Motorsports	Chevrolet
45	37	Stanton Barrett	R&J Racing	Dodge
46	33	Kerry Earnhardt	Richard Childress Racing	Chevrolet
47	84	Kyle Busch	Hendrick Motorsports	Chevrolet
48	00	Kenny Wallace	Michael Waltrip Racing	Chevrolet
49	62	Larry Hollenbeck	Hollenbeck Motorsports	Chevrolet
50	11	J. J. Yeley	Joe Gibbs Racing	Chevrolet
51	35	Mike Wallace	Gary Keller Racing	Chevrolet
52	79	Stan Boyd	Conely Racing	Chevrolet
WD	13	Greg Sacks	Sacks Motorsports	Dodge
WD	75	Mike Garvey	Haefele Racing	Dodge
Official starting lineup

== Race results ==
Fin	St	#	Driver	Team	Make	Laps	Led	Status	Pts	Winnings
1	24	16	Greg Biffle	Roush Racing	Ford	200	73	running	190	$190,180
2	13	6	Mark Martin	Roush Racing	Ford	200	46	running	175	$115,680
3	14	88	Dale Jarrett	Robert Yates Racing	Ford	200	0	running	165	$123,727
4	15	42	Jamie McMurray	Chip Ganassi Racing	Dodge	200	3	running	165	$93,695
5	11	9	Kasey Kahne	Evernham Motorsports	Dodge	200	6	running	160	$110,455
6	7	97	Kurt Busch	Roush Racing	Ford	200	4	running	155	$89,450
7	2	24	Jeff Gordon	Hendrick Motorsports	Chevrolet	200	37	running	151	$119,968
8	5	17	Matt Kenseth	Roush Racing	Ford	200	0	running	142	$117,343
9	4	20	Tony Stewart	Joe Gibbs Racing	Chevrolet	200	0	running	138	$112,493
10	23	99	Carl Edwards	Roush Racing	Ford	200	0	running	134	$105,332
11	10	19	Jeremy Mayfield	Evernham Motorsports	Dodge	200	0	running	130	$94,480
12	28	30	Jeff Burton	Richard Childress Racing	Chevrolet	200	0	running	127	$80,640
13	25	01	Joe Nemechek	MBV Motorsports	Chevrolet	200	0	running	124	$90,865
14	12	12	Ryan Newman	Penske-Jasper Racing	Dodge	200	0	running	121	$109,507
15	20	40	Sterling Marlin	Chip Ganassi Racing	Dodge	200	0	running	118	$100,390
16	8	29	Kevin Harvick	Richard Childress Racing	Chevrolet	200	0	running	115	$101,093
17	17	15	Michael Waltrip	Dale Earnhardt, Inc.	Chevrolet	200	1	running	117	$97,421
18	26	22	Scott Wimmer	Bill Davis Racing	Dodge	199	3	running	114	$85,565
19	31	10	Scott Riggs	MBV Motorsports	Chevrolet	199	12	running	111	$89,352
20	16	41	Casey Mears	Chip Ganassi Racing	Dodge	199	0	running	103	$76,215
21	3	8	Dale Earnhardt Jr.	Dale Earnhardt, Inc.	Chevrolet	199	0	running	100	$107,393
22	22	25	Brian Vickers	Hendrick Motorsports	Chevrolet	199	0	running	97	$71,215
23	34	43	Jeff Green	Petty Enterprises	Dodge	199	0	running	94	$89,140
24	27	21	Ricky Rudd	Wood Brothers Racing	Ford	199	0	running	91	$88,646
25	19	31	Robby Gordon	Richard Childress Racing	Chevrolet	199	0	running	88	$95,827
26	9	18	Bobby Labonte	Joe Gibbs Racing	Chevrolet	199	0	running	85	$104,098
27	21	5	Terry Labonte	Hendrick Motorsports	Chevrolet	199	1	running	87	$88,575
28	33	49	Ken Schrader	BAM Racing	Dodge	199	0	running	79	$61,175
29	32	45	Kyle Petty	Petty Enterprises	Dodge	199	0	running	76	$66,879
30	29	0	Ward Burton	Haas CNC Racing	Chevrolet	196	0	running	73	$58,915
31	38	4	Jimmy Spencer	Morgan–McClure Motorsports	Chevrolet	195	3	running	75	$58,290
32	6	38	Elliott Sadler	Robert Yates Racing	Ford	179	9	running	72	$97,048
33	30	77	Brendan Gaughan	Penske-Jasper Racing	Dodge	157	2	engine	69	$66,140
34	40	89	Morgan Shepherd	Shepherd Racing Ventures	Dodge	113	0	handling	61	$58,960
35	35	32	Ricky Craven	PPI Motorsports	Chevrolet	111	0	clutch	58	$65,890
36	18	2	Rusty Wallace	Penske-Jasper Racing	Dodge	110	0	engine	55	$101,673
37	37	72	Kirk Shelmerdine	Kirk Shelmerdine Racing	Ford	109	0	ignition	52	$57,790
38	41	09	Bobby Hamilton Jr.	Phoenix Racing	Dodge	105	0	engine	49	$57,690
39	43	80	Carl Long	Hover Motorsports	Ford	98	0	rear end	46	$57,645
40	1	48	Jimmie Johnson	Hendrick Motorsports	Chevrolet	81	0	engine	43	$77,385
41	39	98	Derrike Cope	Mach 1 Motorsports	Ford	49	0	steering	40	$57,550
42	42	02	Hermie Sadler	SCORE Motorsports	Chevrolet	27	0	engine	37	$57,510
43	36	50	Todd Bodine	Arnold Motorsports	Dodge	11	0	overheating	34	$56,822
Official race results

Previous race: 2004 Sirius at The Glen	NASCAR Nextel Cup Series; 2004 season	Next race: 2004 Sharpie 500
