= Larry Hollenbeck =

American racing driver (1949–2020)

- Born: April 9, 1949; Kalamazoo, Michigan, U.S.
- Died: October 8, 2020 (aged 71)

NASCAR O'Reilly Auto Parts Series career
- 5 races run over 2 years
- 2004 position: 88th
- Best finish: 88th (2004)
- First race: 2003 Aaron's 312 (Talladega)
- Last race: 2004 Winn-Dixie 250 presented by PepsiCo (Daytona)
Wins	Top tens	Poles
0	0	0
- Statistics up to date as of October 22, 2020.

Lawrence Hollenbeck (April 9, 1949 – October 8, 2020) was an American professional stock car racing driver residing in Kalamazoo, Michigan, where he designed, built and leased residential and commercial properties for 35 years. He had five Busch Series starts to his credit and fielded the #71 S.W.A.T. Fitness Chevy in the ARCA RE/MAX Series.

== Racing career ==
Hollenbeck's race career began at the age of eighteen at the local drag strip. He had also raced in snowmobiles, and spent a decade racing APBA-sanctioned powerboats offshore, and three years at oval tracks racing go-carts.

His stock car career began at a short track in Florida, then he moved on to the ARCA series. In his first race with ARCA he finished in the top-ten at Winchester Speedway in 2001. In 2002, Hollenbeck received his NASCAR Busch license. Hollenbeck ran his first NASCAR Busch series race in Talladega on April 5, 2003, where he finished fifteenth.

In 2004 and 2005, Hollenbeck ran in select Busch races. It was also during this time that Hollenbeck attempted several Nextel Cup races, failing to qualify at Michigan and Atlanta in 2004.

In 2008, Hollenbeck raced in several ARCA races. In the fall race at Talladega he qualified well for the race and had sponsorship from www.boyshomeinc.org.

At the 2009 Lucas Oil Slick Mist 200, Hollenbeck and Patrick Sheltra suffered minor injuries when Hollenbeck T-boned him at about 165 miles per hour. Both were released from the hospital three days later.

== Personal life ==
Hollenbeck died on October 8, 2020.

== Motorsports career results ==
=== NASCAR ===
(key) (Bold – Pole position awarded by qualifying time. Italics – Pole position earned by points standings or practice time. * – Most laps led.)

==== Nextel Cup Series ====
NASCAR Nextel Cup Series results
Year	Team	No.	Make	1	2	3	4	5	6	7	8	9	10	11	12	13	14	15	16	17	18	19	20	21	22	23	24	25	26	27	28	29	30	31	32	33	34	35	36	NNCC	Pts	Ref
2004	Hollenbeck Motorsports	62	Chevy	DAY	CAR	LVS	ATL	DAR	BRI	TEX	MAR	TAL	CAL	RCH	CLT	DOV	POC	MCH	SON	DAY	CHI	NHA	POC	IND	GLN	MCH; DNQ	BRI	CAL	RCH	NHA; Wth	DOV	TAL	KAN	CLT	MAR	ATL; DNQ	PHO	DAR	HOM	NA	-	

==== Busch Series ====
NASCAR Busch Series results
Year	Team	No.	Make	1	2	3	4	5	6	7	8	9	10	11	12	13	14	15	16	17	18	19	20	21	22	23	24	25	26	27	28	29	30	31	32	33	34	35	NBSC	Pts	Ref
2002	White Motorsports	22	Chevy	DAY	CAR	LVS	DAR	BRI	TEX	NSH	TAL	CAL	RCH	NHA	NZH	CLT	DOV	NSH	KEN	MLW	DAY	CHI; DNQ	GTY	PPR	IRP	MCH	BRI	DAR	RCH	DOV	KAN	CLT	MEM	ATL	CAR	PHO	HOM		NA	-	
2003	S.W.A.T. Racing	82	Pontiac	DAY; Wth	CAR	LVS	DAR	BRI	TEX																														101st	161	
2003	S.W.A.T. Racing	62	Pontiac							TAL; 15	NSH	CAL	RCH	GTY	NZH	CLT	DOV	NSH	KEN	MLW	DAY; 40	CHI	NHA	PPR	IRP														101st	161	
2003	S.W.A.T. Racing	62	Chevy																							MCH; DNQ	BRI	DAR	RCH	DOV	KAN	CLT	MEM	ATL	PHO	CAR	HOM		101st	161	
2004	S.W.A.T. Racing	62	Chevy	DAY; 37	CAR	LVS	DAR	BRI	TEX	NSH	TAL; 27	CAL	GTY	RCH	NZH	CLT	DOV	NSH	KEN	MLW	DAY; 23	CHI; DNQ	NHA	PPR	IRP	MCH	BRI	CAL	RCH	DOV	KAN	CLT; DNQ	MEM	ATL	PHO	DAR	HOM		88th	228	
2005	S.W.A.T. Racing	62	Chevy	DAY; DNQ	CAL	MXC	LVS	ATL	NSH	BRI	TEX	PHO	TAL	DAR	RCH	CLT	DOV	NSH	KEN	MLW	DAY	CHI	NHA	PPR	GTY	IRP	GLN	MCH	BRI	CAL	RCH	DOV	KAN	CLT	MEM	TEX	PHO	HOM	N/A	-	
2006	S.W.A.T. Racing	62	Chevy	DAY; DNQ	CAL	MXC	LVS	ATL	BRI	TEX	NSH	PHO	TAL	RCH	DAR	CLT	DOV	NSH	KEN	MLW	DAY	CHI	NHA	MAR	GTY	IRP	GLN	MCH	BRI	CAL	RCH	DOV	KAN	CLT	MEM	TEX	PHO	HOM	N/A	-	

=== ARCA Re/Max Series ===
(key) (Bold – Pole position awarded by qualifying time. Italics – Pole position earned by points standings or practice time. * – Most laps led.)

ARCA Re/Max Series results
Year	Team	No.	Make	1	2	3	4	5	6	7	8	9	10	11	12	13	14	15	16	17	18	19	20	21	22	23	24	25	ARMSC	Pts	Ref
2001	Bob Schacht Motorsports	75	Ford	DAY	NSH	WIN; 10	SLM	GTY; 21																					22nd	1925	
2001	Hollenbeck Motorsports	75	Ford						KEN; 21																				22nd	1925	
2001	Randy Fenley	15	Ford							CLT; 13	KAN	MCH; 12	POC; 14	MEM; 17	GLN	KEN; 9	MCH; 8	POC; 24											22nd	1925	
2001	N/A	37	Pontiac																NSH; 34	ISF	CHI; 23	DSF							22nd	1925	
2001	N/A	56	Chevy																				SLM; 28	TOL					22nd	1925	
2001	Hollenbeck Motorsports	37	Chevy																						BLN; 26	CLT	TAL	ATL	22nd	1925	
2002	Dennis English	83	Ford	DAY	ATL; 20	NSH	SLM	KEN																					117th	195	
2002	Greg Sarff Racing	38	Ford						CLT; 38	KAN	POC	MCH	TOL	SBO	KEN	BLN	POC	NSH	ISF	WIN	DSF	CHI	SLM						117th	195	
2002	S.W.A.T. Racing	22	Chevy																					TAL; DNQ	CLT				117th	195	
2003	S.W.A.T. Racing	10	Pontiac	DAY; DNQ	ATL	NSH	SLM	TOL	KEN	CLT	BLN	KAN	MCH	LER	POC	POC	NSH	ISF	WIN	DSF	CHI	SLM	TAL; DNQ	CLT	SBO				N/A	0	
2004	S.W.A.T. Racing	70	Pontiac	DAY; 16	NSH	SLM	KEN	TOL	CLT	KAN	POC																		77th	325	
2004	S.W.A.T. Racing	70	Chevy									MCH; 31	SBO	BLN	KEN	GTW	POC	LER	NSH	ISF	TOL	DSF	CHI; 26	SLM	TAL				77th	325	
2005	Roulo Brothers Racing	39	Chevy	DAY	NSH	SLM	KEN	TOL	LAN	MIL	POC	MCH; 33	KAN	KEN	BLN	POC	GTW	LER	NSH										70th	400	
2005	Hollenbeck Motorsports	70	Chevy																	MCH; 14	ISF	TOL	DSF						70th	400	
2005	Hollenbeck Motorsports	62	Chevy																					CHI; 11	SLM	TAL			70th	400	
2006	Norm Benning Racing	8	Chevy	DAY	NSH; DNQ	SLM	WIN	KEN	TOL	POC																			N/A	0	
2006	Hollenbeck Motorsports	75	Chevy								MCH; DNQ	KAN	KEN	BLN	POC	GTW	NSH												N/A	0	
2006	Hollenbeck Motorsports	72	Chevy															MCH; DNQ	ISF	MIL	TOL	DSF							N/A	0	
2006	Hollenbeck Motorsports	71	Chevy																				CHI; DNQ	SLM	TAL	IOW			N/A	0	
2007	Hollenbeck Motorsports	8	Chevy	DAY	USA	NSH	SLM	KAN	WIN	KEN	TOL	IOW	POC	MCH; 30	BLN	KEN	POC	NSH	ISF	MIL	GTW	DSF							130th	155	
2007	Hollenbeck Motorsports	71	Chevy																				CHI; DNQ	SLM	TAL; DNQ	TOL; DNQ			130th	155	
2008	Hollenbeck Motorsports	62	Chevy	DAY; DNQ	SLM	IOW	KAN	CAR	KEN	TOL	POC									CHI; DNQ	SLM	NJE		TOL; DNQ					53rd	575	
2008	Hollenbeck Motorsports	29	Chevy									MCH; 28	CAY	KEN	BLN; 20	POC	NSH	ISF	DSF				TAL; 40						53rd	575	
2009	Hollenbeck Motorsports	23	Chevy	DAY; 15	SLM	CAR	TAL	KEN	TOL	POC																			112th	195	
2009	Hollenbeck Motorsports	28	Chevy								MCH; 38	MFD	IOW	KEN	BLN	POC	ISF	CHI	TOL	DSF	NJE	SLM	KAN	CAR					112th	195	
