= Derrike Cope =

American racing driver (born 1958)

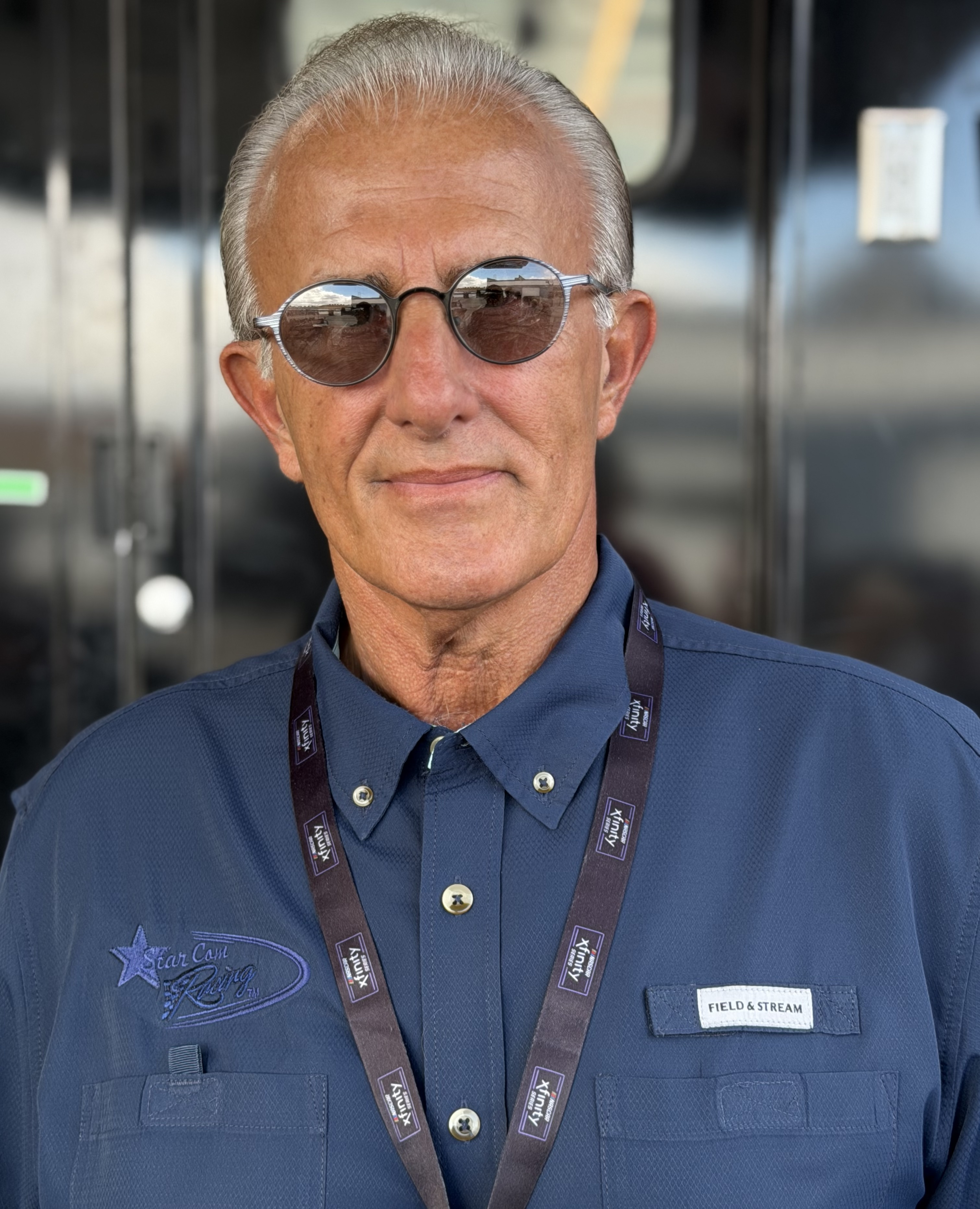
- Cope in 2025
- Born: Derrike Wayne Cope; November 3, 1958 (age 68); San Diego, California, U.S.
- Achievements: 1990 Daytona 500 Winner
- Awards: 1984 Winston West Series Rookie of the Year; West Coast Stock Car Hall of Fame (2013)

NASCAR Cup Series career
- 429 races run over 32 years
- 2021 position: 42nd
- Best finish: 15th (1995)
- First race: 1982 Winston Western 500 (Riverside)
- Last race: 2021 Daytona 500 (Daytona)
- First win: 1990 Daytona 500 (Daytona)
- Last win: 1990 Budweiser 500 (Dover)
| Wins | Top tens | Poles |
|---|---|---|
| 2 | 32 | 1 |

NASCAR O'Reilly Auto Parts Series career
- 280 races run over 22 years
- 2016 position: 29th
- Best finish: 20th (2011)
- First race: 1990 Budweiser 300 (New Hampshire)
- Last race: 2016 Kansas Lottery 300 (Kansas)
- First win: 1994 NE Chevy 250 (New Hampshire)
| Wins | Top tens | Poles |
|---|---|---|
| 1 | 8 | 1 |

NASCAR FedEx Freight Truck Series career
- 15 races run over 7 years
- Best finish: 51st (2007)
- First race: 1995 Fas Mart SuperTruck Shootout (Richmond)
- Last race: 2008 Power Stroke Diesel 200 (IRP)
| Wins | Top tens | Poles |
|---|---|---|
| 0 | 1 | 0 |
- Statistics up to date as of December 25, 2021.

Derrike Wayne Cope (born November 3, 1958) is an American professional stock car racing driver and team owner. He is best known for his win in the 1990 Daytona 500. He last competed in the NASCAR Cup Series, driving the No. 15 Chevrolet Camaro ZL1 for Rick Ware Racing in an alliance with his own StarCom Racing. Cope also was team manager of StarCom. As of 2022, he is the last driver to compete in at least one NASCAR Cup Series race in five consecutive decades (1980s, 1990s, 2000s, 2010s, 2020s).

== Early life and education ==
Cope was born in San Diego, California and raised in Spanaway, Washington. In high school, he enjoyed auto racing and baseball. He was a catcher on the Bethel High School baseball team, and later played college baseball at Whitman College. While being scouted by Major League Baseball teams, Cope suffered a knee injury that ended his playing career. He then devoted himself to racing full-time.

== Career ==
=== Early career ===
Cope progressed through the short-track ranks in the Northwest, and later made his Winston Cup Series debut at Riverside International Raceway in 1982. Cope's No. 95 car finished 36th there after developing an oil leak, and he won $625. He ran part-time in the Winston Cup Series after that, making an attempt at Rookie of the Year in 1987. In 1989, he signed with Bob Whitcomb to drive the No. 10 Purolator Pontiac and later Chevrolet, posting four top-ten finishes.

=== 1990–1995 ===
During the last lap of the 1990 Daytona 500, Dale Earnhardt ran over a piece of debris and cut a tire in turn three. After narrowly avoiding most of the resulting debris, Cope went underneath, passed Earnhardt's slowing car, assumed the lead and earned his first win, as well as his first top-five (his best finish prior to the 1990 Daytona 500 was sixth) in NASCAR competition. He appeared on Late Night with David Letterman that week. At Dover later in the 1990 season, Cope rallied for another win after running out of fuel and falling off the lead lap. At year's end, he wound up eighteenth in points.

Following the 1992 season, the Whitcomb team closed down, and Cope drove an originally unsponsored No. 66 Ford for Cale Yarborough. After Daytona, the car was sponsored by Bojangles, and the number changed to No. 98 starting the next race at Rockingham, reflecting the restaurant's 98 cent value menu. Midway through the 1994 season, Cope was replaced by Jeremy Mayfield and began driving for Bobby Allison's No. 12 Straight Arrow-sponsored Ford, after a brief stint with car owner T.W. Taylor. During this season, Cope won his first career Busch Series race at New Hampshire International Speedway, driving the No. 82 Ford Thunderbird for Ron Zook, co-owner of Bobby Allison Motorsports. The 1995 season was Cope's most consistent. He had eight top-ten finishes, and garnered a fifteenth place finish in points. His best finish of the season was at Phoenix, in which he led 34 laps and finished runner-up to Ricky Rudd following a late-race shootout.

=== 1996–2005 ===
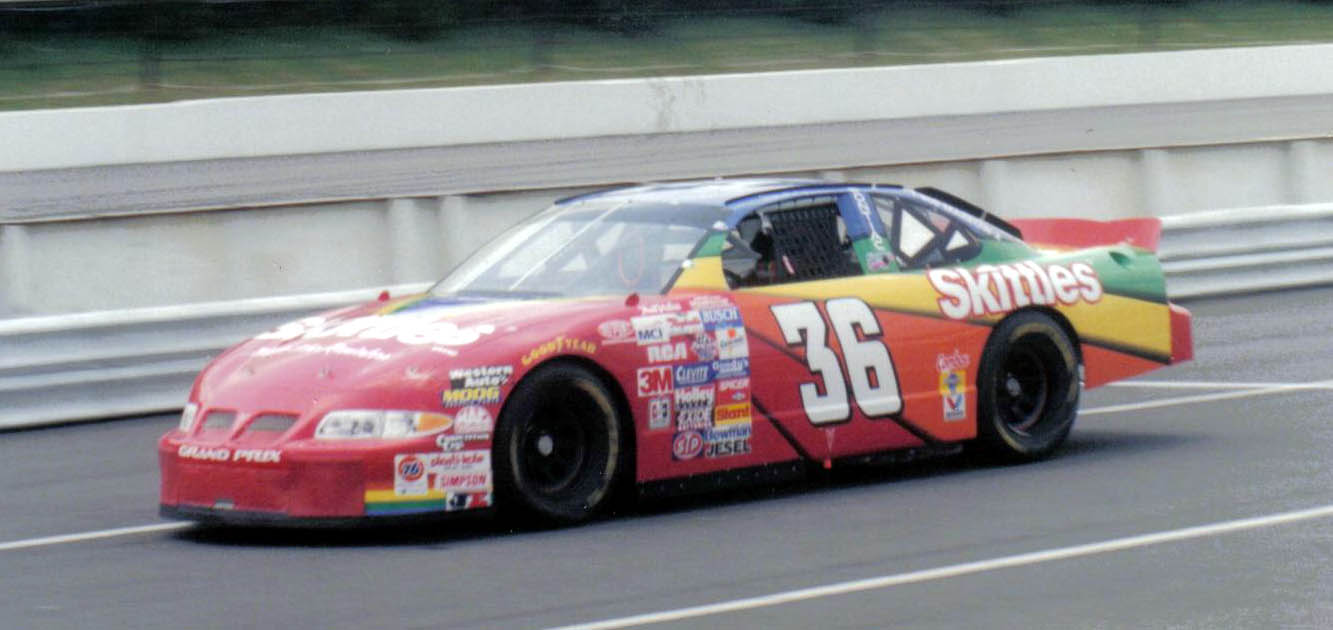
Cope's No. 36 car in 1997

When Allison's team shut down after the 1996 season, Cope signed on with the fledgling MB2 Motorsports operation, driving the No. 36 Skittles-sponsored Pontiac to a 27th-place finish in points. After one year, he was released and signed on with the Bahari Racing operation. Despite missing some races due to an injury, Cope won his first career pole position at Lowe's Motor Speedway, although he failed to post a top-ten finish in the No. 30 Gumout-sponsored car. Cope returned to Bahari in 1999 with Sara Lee sponsorship. After failing to qualify for ten races, Cope was released from the team. He made sporadic appearances for LJ Racing and Larry Hedrick Motorsports, and later signed on to drive the No. 15 Ford Taurus owned by Fenley-Moore Motorsports. Cope quit after a few races. He spent the rest of the year on the sidelines, before taking over the No. 86 R.C. Cola-sponsored Dodge Ram at Impact Motorsports at the end of the season in the Craftsman Truck Series.

In 2001, Cope announced the formation of Quest Motor Racing, a team he would co-own with drag racer Warren Johnson. The team did not qualify for a race all year, and his only start came with CLR Racing. He ran four races in the Busch Series in the No. 94 owned by Fred Bickford, posting a best finish of 21st at Bristol Motor Speedway. The team had mild success the next year, garnering sponsorship from Avacor and Poison. Cope also ran some races with BAM Racing that year. After eighteen starts in 2003 driving the No. 37 Friendly's Ice Cream-sponsored Chevrolet, Cope merged the team with Arnold Motorsports. Cope qualified fifth for the 2004 Carolina Dodge Dealers 400, but after several starts, Cope was released from the ride, and took back his equipment. He also ran thirty races in the No. 49 Advil-sponsored Ford for Jay Robinson in the Busch Series that season. His best finish, twentieth, came at Daytona. In 2005, Cope tried merging his team again, joining forces with Larry Hollenbeck and S.W.A.T. Fitness, but lost the opportunity after he failed to qualify for the Daytona 500. Cope had attempted a couple of races with Ware Racing Enterprises before making his only Cup start of the season at Martinsville Speedway, finishing 33rd in the No. 08 Royal Administration/Sundance Vacations/My Guardian 911-sponsored Dodge for McGlynn Racing. Cope was later given the team's full-time ride in the No. 00, as requested by the sponsor.

=== 2006–2011 ===
In 2006, Cope intended to run a full schedule for McGlynn with No. 74 car, but soon cut back to part-time. His best finish was at Michigan International Speedway, where he finished 34th. In the Busch Series, his best finish in the 49 car was 33rd at Dover International Speedway, and his best start was 33rd at Bristol Motor Speedway. He intended to run more races with McGlynn in 2007, but the team suspended operations after only attempting one race. He spent the season driving part-time schedules for Robinson and Xpress Motorsports.

In 2008, he signed to drive for Means Racing in the Nationwide Series, but switched midseason to drive for James Finch and Jay Robinson Racing. Later in the season, Cope began entering his own trucks and cars in the Craftsman Truck Series and Nationwide Series. In the truck series he fielded the No. 73 and No. 74 trucks with Nick Tucker and Jennifer Jo Cobb being the primary drivers, while in the Nationwide Series he fielded the No. 73 and No. 78 cars with Kevin Lepage driving the No. 73 and others racing the No. 78.

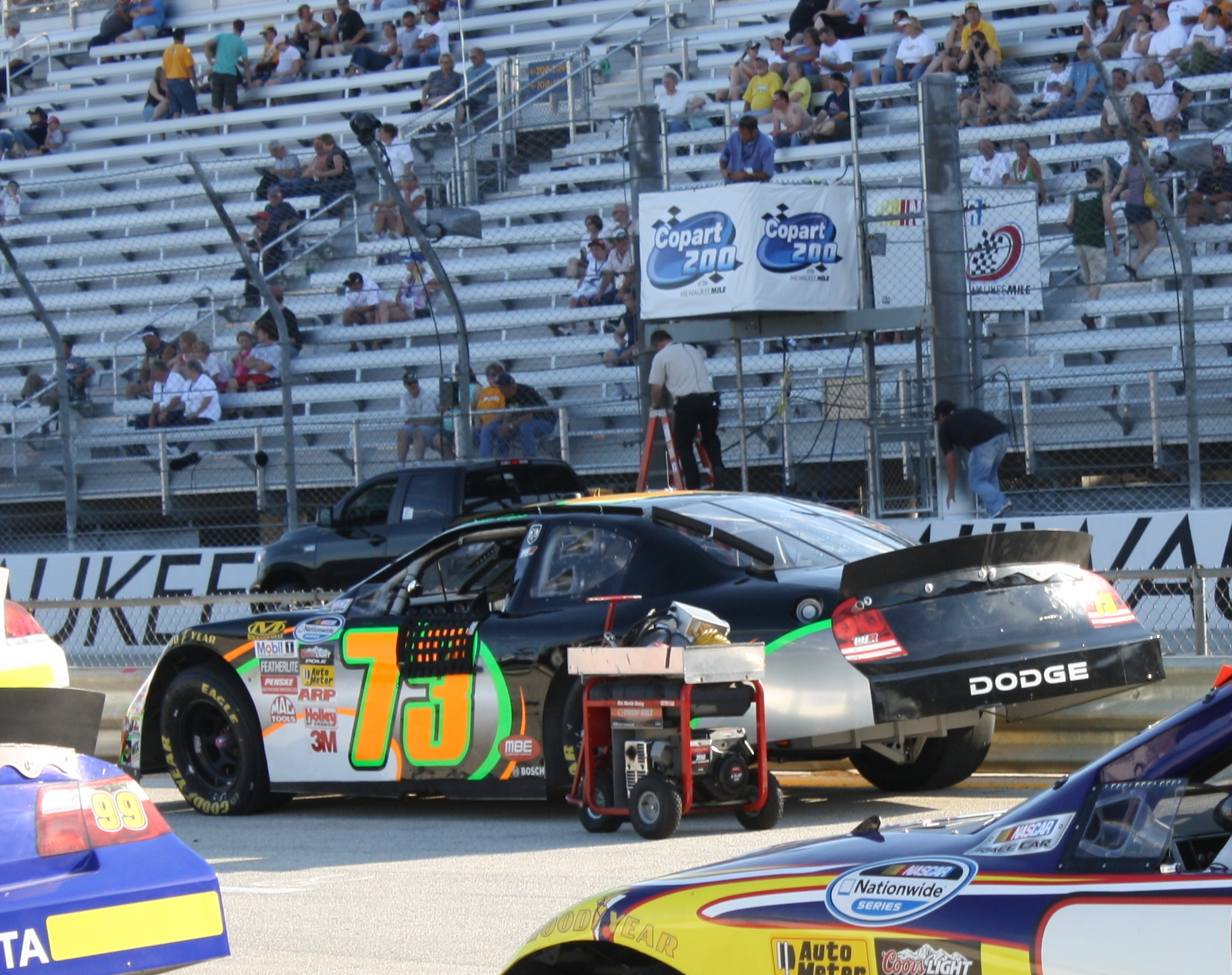
Cope in his No. 73 Nationwide car in 2009

As the 2009 season approached, Cope announced he would be involved on all three of NASCAR's circuits, as he would pilot the No. 75 Cope/Keller Racing Dodge in the Sprint Cup series with BluFrog Energy Drink coming on board as a primary sponsor during Daytona Speedweeks. He began the season as the driver of the No. 41 Metal Jeans Chevrolet Impala for Rick Ware Racing in the Nationwide Series, but was released after three races, and moved to his own team. He has also fielded trucks part-time for himself, Larry Foyt, and Jennifer Jo Cobb. Cope has fielded the No. 78 car for one race in nationwide. He has fielded the No. 73 for most of the races.

In 2009, Cope attempted six races with his self-owned team; he failed to qualify for any of them. At the October Martinsville race, Cope successfully attempted his first Sprint Cup race since 2006 while driving for Larry Gunselman.

In 2010, Cope teamed up with Dale Clemons as co-owners of new racing venture Stratus Racing Group. The team ran a full schedule with Cope as driver in both the Nationwide Series and Camping World Truck Series. It also ran a limited schedule in the ARCA Re/Max Series, fielding a car for Cope's twin nieces Amber Cope and Angela Cope, who split the ride.

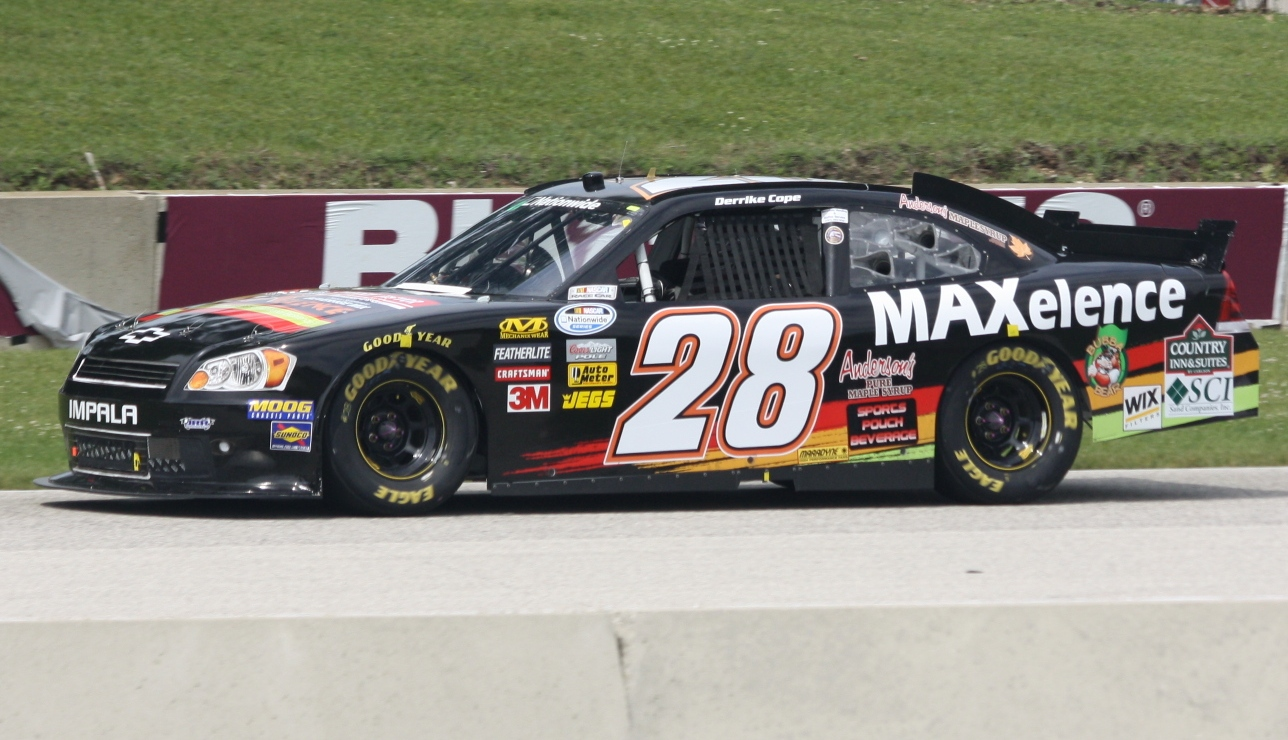
Cope racing his 2011 Nationwide car

Cope returned to Jay Robinson Inc. for 2011 in the No. 28 Chevrolet. For the 2011 Daytona 500, Cope attempted to qualify the No. 64 Toyota for Larry Gunselman with sponsorship from Sta-Bil. Cope finished thirteenth in the Budweiser Shootout driving for Gunselman. Cope has decided to field his Cup car in select races with manufacturing backing from Chevrolet instead of Dodge. In the 2011 Sprint Showdown, Cope was involved in a crash with Landon Cassill, where he T-boned Cassill's car when he spun out. Neither driver was injured. Cope finished twentieth in Nationwide Series standings, competing in all but one event.

=== 2012–2016 ===
Cope returned to the Nationwide Series in 2012, competing in the No. 73 Chevrolet for his own CFK Motorsports. After missing the opening race at Daytona, Cope returned to Jay Robinson's team for Las Vegas, and later Darlington for ML Motorsports. Cope and his No. 73 the fall race a Phoenix. Cope announced that he would run a part-time schedule in 2013. Cope made his first attempt at Darlington, resulting in a DNQ. Cope would qualify at Kentucky, finishing 39th. After two more DNQs at Richmond and Charlotte in his own car, Cope was hired to run the No. 70 Toyota, driving for NEMCO-JRR at Phoenix International Raceway, but after a crash in qualifying crash, Cope's No. 73 Chevy Impala was the 70 car's backup. Cope finished 35th.

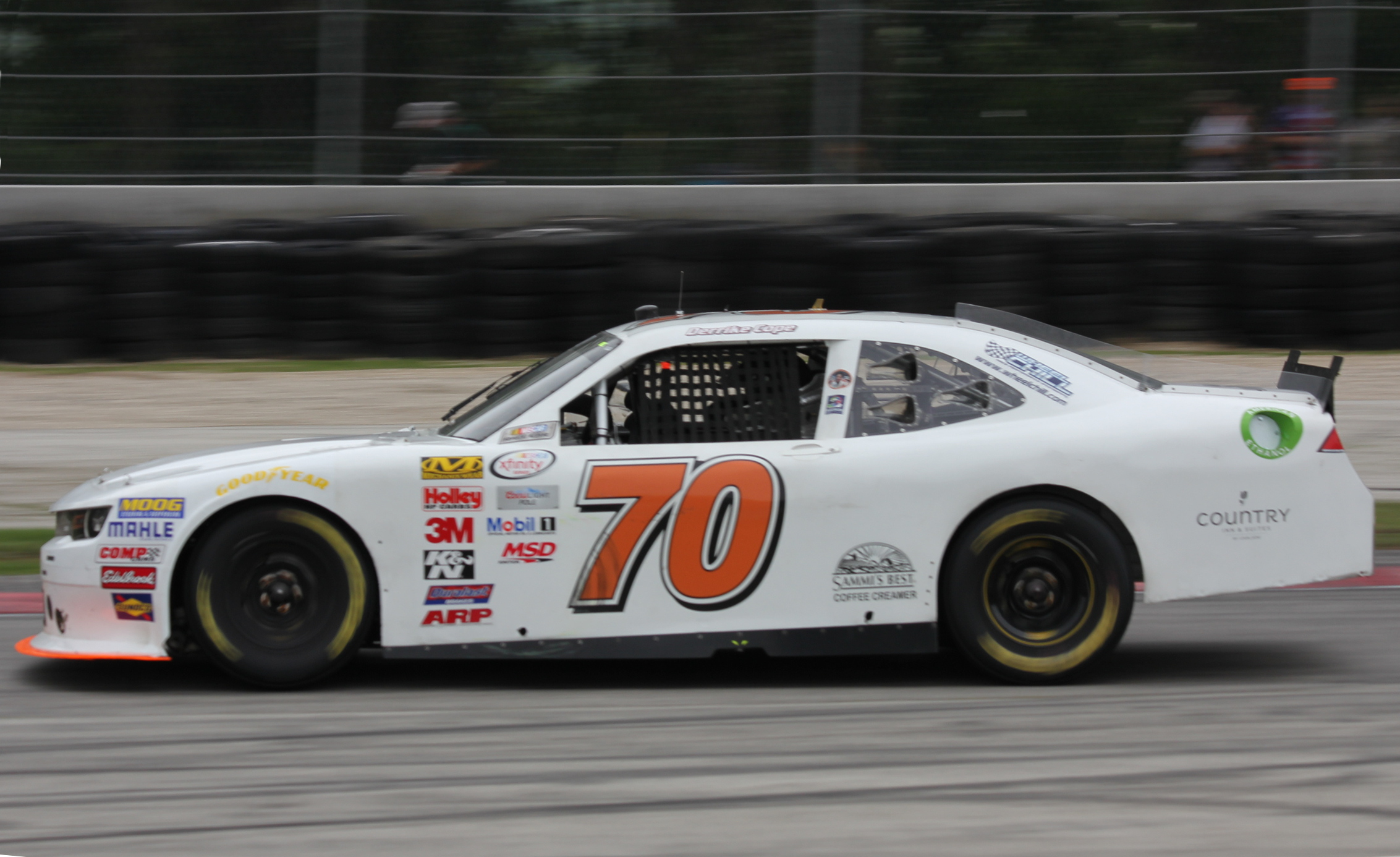
2015 Xfinity car at Road America

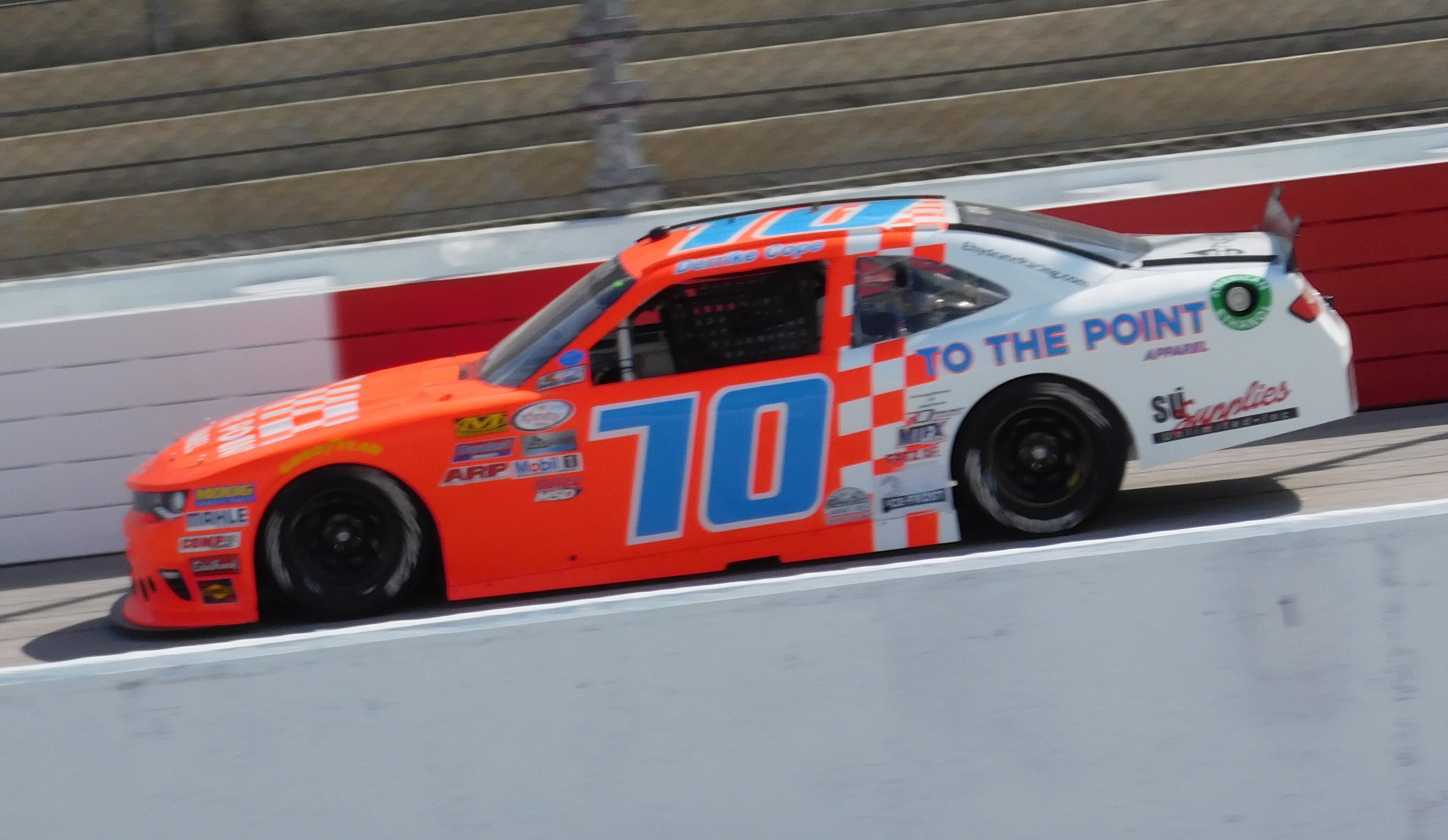
Cope's No. 70 car at Darlington Raceway in 2016

In 2014, Cope's team bought the equipment from the defunct ML Motorsports. After piecing together sponsorship deals early on, Youtheory agreed to sponsor Cope for the entire 2014 season, enabling Cope to race full-time for the first time since 2011. He piloted the No. 70 Youtheory Chevrolet to a 22nd-place points finish. In January 2015, Cope announced that he would return to the Xfinity Series for the part-time 2015 season with Charlie's Soap as the sponsor. The 2015 season saw a dip in performance. At Auto Club, Cope's hauler was swarmed with bees. Several crew members, including Cope's wife, were stuck inside the hauler. Cope attempted 29 races, with Matt Frahm, Matt Waltz and Garrett Smithley running the remaining four. Cope returned in 2016, with him driving 28 races, Timmy Hill driving two races and Dexter Stacey driving the last three races of season. Cope missed the race at Daytona after issues in qualifying, but qualified the following week in Atlanta. During the Zippo 200 at The Glen, Cope radioed to his team that he was having a brake problem. Shortly after, the front end of the car exploded and black smoke blew from the car. NASCAR confiscated the car and investigated what had happened. Cope was unharmed. It was later discovered that the explosion was caused by tire failure triggered by excess heat from a broken spindle.

=== 2017 ===
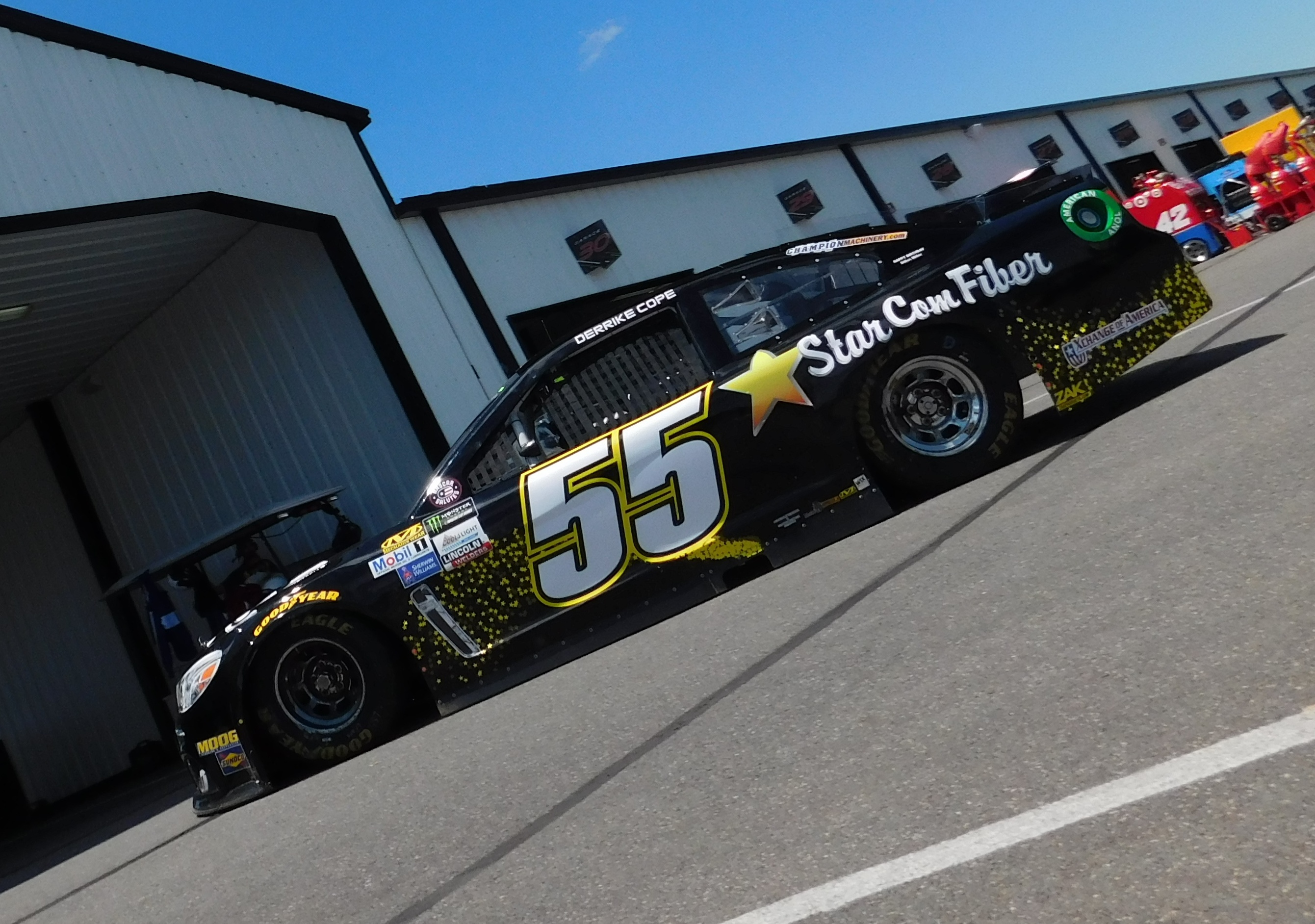
Cope's car at Pocono Raceway in 2017.

In January 2017, Cope closed down his Xfinity Series team after sixteen years of competition. In February, it was announced that Cope would return to the NASCAR Cup Series, driving for Premium Motorsports. On March 3, Cope qualified for the Folds of Honor QuikTrip 500 at Atlanta Motor Speedway, his first race since 2009 at NASCAR's highest level. Cope finished under power in 36th, after suffering power steering problems during the race. Sundance Vacations and the United Way of NEPA partnered to sponsor Cope at the Overton's 400 at Pocono. As part of Darlington Raceway's annual "throwback" weekend, Cope's No. 55 car was designed like his No. 12 Mane 'n Tail car that he drove for Bobby Allison Motorsports from 1994 to 1996, and Mane 'n Tail returned as the sponsor.

On September 10, 2017, Cope announced that he and Premium Motorsports had agreed to part ways, saying, "I'm thankful to Jay Robinson and the folks at Premium for the opportunity they have given me this season to return to the Cup Series but the timing is right to pursue other opportunities." Two weeks later, Premium sponsor StarCom Fiber formed StarCom Racing, fielding the No. 00 for Cope at Dover. On September 26, 2017, however, StarCom Racing announced their withdrawal from Dover due to personnel hiring and timing. Cope did make his first start with StarCom at the Hollywood Casino 400 at Kansas, starting 39th and finishing last after mechanical problems plagued the car. Cope's best race of the season came in the penultimate race of the season at Phoenix. He started last due to not making a qualifying run after an engine problem appeared on his No. 00, but spent most of the race charging through the field to place 32nd due to late-race crashes.

=== 2018–2021 ===
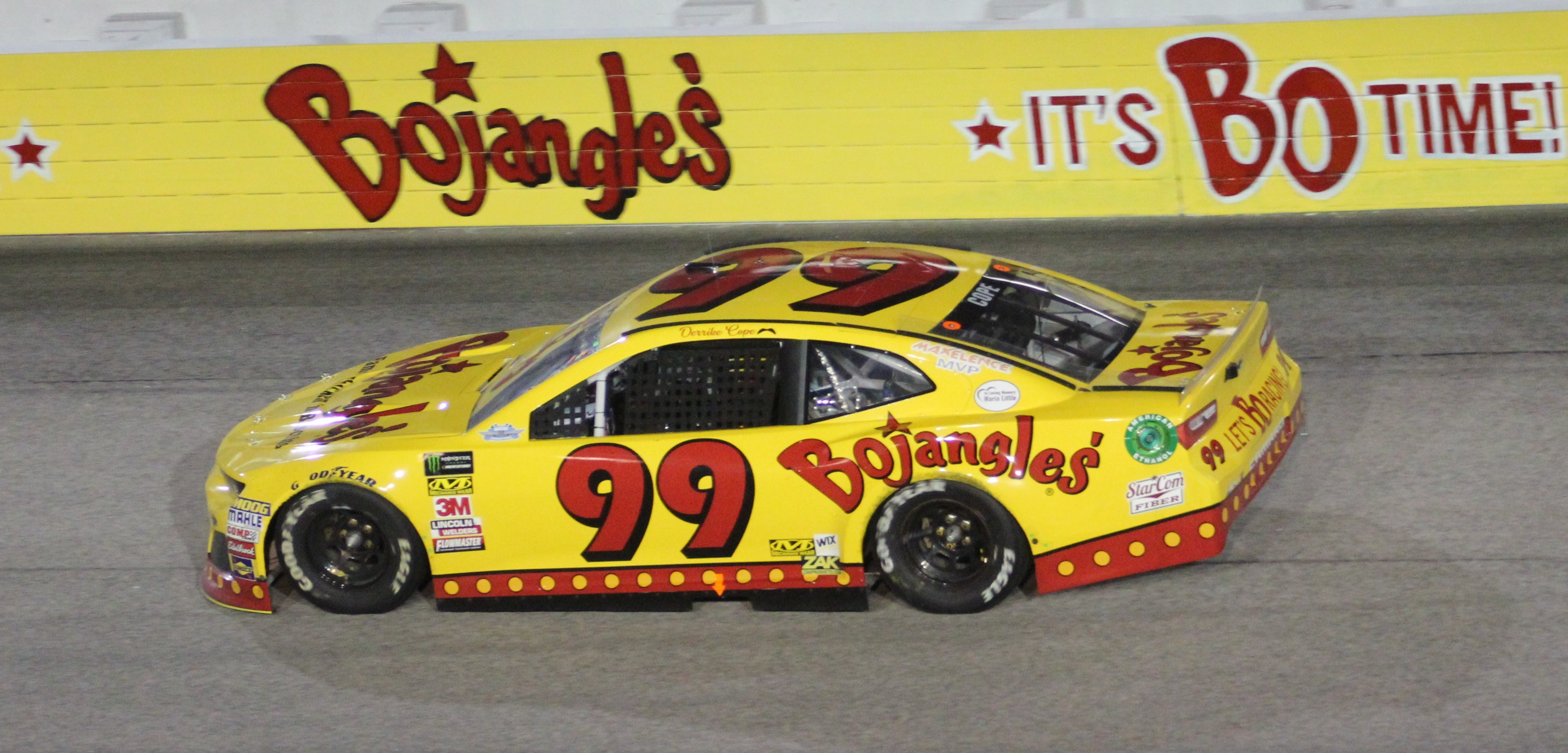
Cope competing in the 2018 Bojangles' Southern 500 throwback race.

In January 2018, StarCom Racing announced that they had secured a charter for the 2018 Cup Series season and would run the full schedule, with Cope and Jeffrey Earnhardt serving for the majority of the schedule. Earnhardt and StarCom split, however, and Landon Cassill was hired. Cope announced that they would hopefully run his No. 99 car at Texas Motor Speedway, though the team did not attempt to make that race. Cope and the 99 made their 2018 debut at Dover International Speedway, the site of Cope's second Cup win in 1990. Cope also ran Pocono and Darlington that year. Cope ran Darlington with sponsorship from Bojangles, who sponsored Cope in 1993, for the annual Throwback Weekend.

After focusing on his management role in 2019 and 2020, Cope announced a return to driving in 2021, driving the No. 15 Jacob Companies Chevrolet Camaro for Rick Ware Racing in a partnership with StarCom Racing for the Daytona 500. At season's end, StarCom shut down, making Cope a free agent.

=== 2022–present ===
At the end of 2021, with StarCom shutting down, Cope and his wife sold their shares of the operation. Afterwards, Cope joined Nick Tucker's SCCA team, Nitro Motorsports, in the managing department of Nitro's Trans-Am 2 team. He has also been active in the GT America Series.

== Personal life ==
Cope's first cousin is NASCAR crew chief Ernie Cope. Cope's nieces, Angela Ruch and Amber Cope, and cousin Nick Tucker have also raced in NASCAR. Angela still competes part time, while Amber quit driving in 2012 after an incident with Kevin Harvick.

== Motorsports career results ==
=== NASCAR ===
(key) (Bold – Pole position awarded by qualifying time. Italics – Pole position earned by points standings or practice time. * – Most laps led.)

==== Cup Series ====
NASCAR Cup Series results
| Year | Team | No. | Make | 1 | 2 | 3 | 4 | 5 | 6 | 7 | 8 | 9 | 10 | 11 | 12 | 13 | 14 | 15 | 16 | 17 | 18 | 19 | 20 | 21 | 22 | 23 | 24 | 25 | 26 | 27 | 28 | 29 | 30 | 31 | 32 | 33 | 34 | 35 | 36 | NCSC | Pts | Ref |
|---|---|---|---|---|---|---|---|---|---|---|---|---|---|---|---|---|---|---|---|---|---|---|---|---|---|---|---|---|---|---|---|---|---|---|---|---|---|---|---|---|---|---|
| 1982 | Jefferson Racing | 95 | Ford | DAY | RCH | BRI | ATL | CAR | DAR | NWS | MAR | TAL | NSV | DOV | CLT | POC | RSD | MCH | DAY | NSV | POC | TAL | MCH | BRI | DAR | RCH | DOV | NWS | CLT | MAR | CAR | ATL | RSD; 36 | | | | | | | 101st | 55 | |
| 1984 | Jefferson Racing | 95 | Ford | DAY | RCH | CAR | ATL | BRI | NWS | DAR | MAR | TAL | NSV | DOV | CLT | RSD; 15 | POC | MCH | DAY | NSV | POC | TAL | MCH | BRI | DAR | | | | | | | | RSD; 18 | | | | | | | 57th | - | |
| 1984 | Jefferson Racing | 07 | Ford | | | | | | | | | | | | | | | | | | | | | | | RCH; 29 | DOV | MAR | CLT | NWS | CAR | ATL | | | | | | | | 57th | - | |
| 1985 | Jefferson Racing | 07 | Ford | DAY | RCH | CAR | ATL | BRI | DAR | NWS | MAR | TAL | DOV | CLT | RSD; 15 | POC | MCH | DAY | POC | TAL | MCH | BRI | DAR | RCH | DOV | MAR | NWS | CLT | CAR | ATL | RSD; 19 | | | | | | | | | 55th | 224 | |
| 1986 | Autosports Enterprises | 79 | Ford | DAY | RCH | CAR | ATL | BRI | DAR | NWS | MAR; 9 | TAL | DOV | CLT; 30 | RSD; 31 | POC | MCH; 28 | DAY | POC | TAL | GLN | MCH | BRI | DAR | RCH | DOV | MAR | NWS | CLT | CAR | ATL | RSD; 41 | | | | | | | | 45th | 400 | |
| 1987 | Stoke Racing | 19 | Ford | DAY; 33 | CAR | RCH | ATL; 36 | DAR | NWS | BRI | | | CLT; 37 | DOV | | | MCH; 41 | DAY | | | | MCH; 38 | BRI; 16 | DAR | RCH | DOV | MAR | NWS | CLT; 39 | CAR | | | | | | | | | | 37th | 797 | |
| 1987 | Stoke Racing | 19 | Chevy | | | | | | | | MAR; 13 | TAL | | | POC; 38 | RSD | | | POC; 31 | TAL | GLN; 31 | | | | | | | | | | | | | | | | | | | 37th | 797 | |
| 1987 | Stoke Racing | 93 | Chevy | | | | | | | | | | | | | | | | | | | | | | | | | | | | RSD; 20 | ATL | | | | | | | | 37th | 797 | |
| 1988 | Testa Racing | 68 | Ford | DAY; 27 | RCH; 32 | CAR; 20 | ATL; 26 | DAR; 26 | BRI; 24 | NWS; 22 | MAR; 29 | TAL; 26 | CLT; 40 | DOV; 18 | | POC; 24 | MCH; 32 | DAY; 39 | POC; 33 | TAL; 24 | GLN; 40 | MCH; 34 | BRI; 30 | DAR; 35 | RCH; DNQ | DOV; 36 | MAR | CLT; 32 | NWS | CAR; 36 | PHO; 16 | ATL; 33 | | | | | | | | 31st | 1985 | |
| 1988 | Testa Racing | 68 | Chevy | | | | | | | | | | | | RSD; 17 | | | | | | | | | | | | | | | | | | | | | | | | | 31st | 1985 | |
| 1989 | Testa Racing | 68 | Pontiac | DAY; DNQ | CAR | ATL; 34 | RCH; 35 | DAR; 35 | BRI | NWS | MAR | | | | | | | | | | | | | | | | | | | | | | | | | | | | | 28th | 2180 | |
| 1989 | Bob Whitcomb Racing | 10 | Pontiac | | | | | | | | | TAL; 30 | CLT; 12 | DOV; 28 | SON | POC; 36 | MCH; 9 | DAY; 26 | POC; 35 | TAL; 38 | GLN; 40 | MCH; 6 | BRI; 29 | DAR; 25 | RCH; 25 | DOV; 8 | MAR; 13 | CLT; 6 | NWS; 26 | CAR; 11 | PHO; 14 | ATL; 12 | | | | | | | | 28th | 2180 | |
| 1990 | Bob Whitcomb Racing | 10 | Chevy | DAY; 1 | RCH; 29 | CAR; 12 | ATL; 29 | DAR; 27 | BRI; 32 | NWS; 21 | MAR; 17 | TAL; 40 | CLT; 9 | DOV; 1 | SON; 13 | POC; 12 | MCH; 12 | DAY; 28 | POC; 13 | TAL; 7 | GLN; 35 | MCH; 19 | BRI; 27 | DAR; 9 | RCH; 35 | DOV; 13 | MAR; 24 | NWS; 22 | CLT; 7 | CAR; 33 | PHO; 14 | ATL; 12 | | | | | | | | 18th | 3140 | |
| 1991 | Bob Whitcomb Racing | 10 | Chevy | DAY; 26 | RCH; 32 | CAR; 34 | ATL; 11 | DAR; 31 | BRI; 32 | NWS; 15 | MAR; DNQ | TAL; 28 | CLT; 12 | DOV; 27 | SON; 30 | POC; 10 | MCH; 41 | DAY; 17 | POC; 36 | TAL; 35 | GLN; 13 | MCH; 34 | BRI; 29 | DAR; 4 | RCH; 16 | DOV; 36 | MAR; 19 | NWS; 30 | CLT; 33 | CAR; 15 | PHO; 16 | ATL; 24 | | | | | | | | 28th | 2516 | |
| 1992 | Bob Whitcomb Racing | 10 | Chevy | DAY; 34 | CAR; 19 | RCH; 19 | ATL; 14 | DAR; 16 | BRI; 10 | NWS; 14 | MAR; 22 | TAL; 12 | CLT; 17 | DOV; 33 | SON; 18 | POC; 12 | MCH; 22 | DAY; 34 | POC; 19 | TAL; 22 | GLN; 34 | MCH; 33 | BRI; 12 | DAR; 12 | RCH; 35 | DOV; 9 | MAR; 20 | NWS; 22 | CLT; 17 | CAR; 14 | PHO; 7 | ATL; 15 | | | | | | | | 21st | 3033 | |
| 1993 | Cale Yarborough Motorsports | 66 | Ford | DAY; 29 | | | | | | | | | | | | | | | | | | | | | | | | | | | | | | | | | | | | 26th | 2787 | |
| 1993 | Cale Yarborough Motorsports | 98 | Ford | | CAR; 18 | RCH; 19 | ATL; 17 | DAR; 17 | BRI; 12 | NWS; 30 | MAR; 25 | TAL; 8 | SON; 18 | CLT; 36 | DOV; 31 | POC; 33 | MCH; 27 | DAY; 24 | NHA; 22 | POC; 29 | TAL; 36 | GLN; 11 | MCH; 21 | BRI; 27 | DAR; 17 | RCH; 28 | DOV; 32 | MAR; 20 | NWS; 20 | CLT; 39 | CAR; 19 | PHO; 23 | ATL; 19 | | | | | | | 26th | 2787 | |
| 1994 | Cale Yarborough Motorsports | 98 | Ford | DAY; 21 | CAR; 29 | RCH; 29 | ATL; 34 | DAR; 16 | BRI; 27 | NWS; 27 | MAR; 28 | TAL; 31 | SON; 43 | CLT; 18 | DOV; 23 | POC; 40 | MCH; 37 | DAY; 23 | NHA; 35 | | | | | | | | | | | | | | | | | | | | | 30th | 2612 | |
| 1994 | Taylor Racing | 02 | Ford | | | | | | | | | | | | | | | | | POC; 19 | TAL; DNQ | IND; 27 | | | | | | | | | | | | | | | | | | 30th | 2612 | |
| 1994 | Bobby Allison Motorsports | 12 | Ford | | | | | | | | | | | | | | | | | | | | GLN; 40 | MCH; 18 | BRI; 16 | DAR; 35 | RCH; 19 | DOV; 12 | MAR; 17 | NWS; 19 | CLT; 8 | CAR; 37 | PHO; 30 | ATL; 7 | | | | | | 30th | 2612 | |
| 1995 | Bobby Allison Motorsports | 12 | Ford | DAY; 31 | CAR; 8 | RCH; 6 | ATL; 13 | DAR; 5 | BRI; 13 | NWS; 30 | MAR; 28 | TAL; 42 | SON; 12 | CLT; 19 | DOV; 12 | POC; 20 | MCH; 19 | DAY; 13 | NHA; 7 | POC; 39 | TAL; 15 | IND; 40 | GLN; 15 | MCH; 34 | BRI; 10 | DAR; 15 | RCH; 34 | DOV; 7 | MAR; 9 | NWS; 13 | CLT; 11 | CAR; 19 | PHO; 2 | ATL; 35 | | | | | | 15th | 3384 | |
| 1996 | Bobby Allison Motorsports | 12 | Ford | DAY; 41 | CAR; 8 | RCH; 22 | ATL; 35 | DAR; 39 | BRI; 22 | NWS; 13 | MAR; 28 | TAL; 29 | SON; 39 | CLT; 14 | DOV; 23 | POC; 27 | MCH; 40 | DAY; 42 | NHA; 38 | POC; 10 | TAL; 27 | IND; 14 | GLN; 16 | MCH; 24 | BRI; 29 | DAR; 34 | RCH; 8 | DOV; 31 | MAR; DNQ | NWS; 37 | CLT; 18 | CAR; 39 | PHO; 43 | ATL; DNQ | | | | | | 35th | 2374 | |
| 1997 | MB2 Motorsports | 36 | Pontiac | DAY; 36 | CAR; 31 | RCH; 30 | ATL; DNQ | DAR; 20 | TEX; 41 | BRI; 16 | MAR; 34 | SON; 18 | TAL; 13 | CLT; 12 | DOV; 20 | POC; 11 | MCH; 8 | CAL; 29 | DAY; 28 | NHA; 20 | POC; 16 | IND; 41 | GLN; 38 | MCH; 16 | BRI; 32 | DAR; 14 | RCH; 16 | NHA; 26 | DOV; 30 | MAR; 36 | CLT; 33 | TAL; 18 | CAR; 20 | PHO; 16 | ATL; 5 | | | | | 27th | 2901 | |
| 1998 | Bahari Racing | 30 | Pontiac | DAY; 37 | CAR; 15 | LVS; 31 | ATL; 38 | DAR; 40 | BRI; 26 | TEX; DNQ | MAR | TAL; 22 | CAL; 39 | CLT; 33 | DOV; 35 | RCH; 34 | MCH; DNQ | POC; 26 | SON; 38 | NHA; 16 | POC; 23 | IND; DNQ | GLN; 39 | MCH; 43 | BRI; 36 | NHA; DNQ | DAR; 27 | RCH; 24 | DOV; 35 | MAR; 30 | **CLT**; 14 | TAL; 11 | DAY; 38 | PHO; 33 | CAR; 25 | ATL; 30 | | | | 37th | 2065 | |
| 1999 | Bahari Racing | 30 | Pontiac | DAY; 18 | CAR; DNQ | LVS; 34 | ATL; 41 | DAR; DNQ | TEX; 22 | BRI; DNQ | MAR; 34 | TAL; DNQ | CAL; 42 | RCH; 42 | CLT; DNQ | DOV; 36 | MCH; 32 | POC; DNQ | SON; 37 | DAY; DNQ | NHA; DNQ | POC; DNQ | IND; 32 | | | | | | | | | | | | | | | | | 44th | 915 | |
| 1999 | Eel River Racing | 30 | Pontiac | | | | | | | | | | | | | | | | | | | | | GLN; DNQ | MCH; DNQ | BRI | DAR | RCH | | | | | | | | | | | | 44th | 915 | |
| 1999 | LJ Racing | 91 | Chevy | | | | | | | | | | | | | | | | | | | | | | | | | | NHA; DNQ | DOV; DNQ | MAR | | | | | | | | | 44th | 915 | |
| 1999 | Fenley-Moore Motorsports | 15 | Ford | | | | | | | | | | | | | | | | | | | | | | | | | | | | | CLT; 35 | | | | | ATL; DNQ | | | 44th | 915 | |
| 1999 | Larry Hedrick Motorsports | 41 | Chevy | | | | | | | | | | | | | | | | | | | | | | | | | | | | | | TAL; 37 | CAR; 25 | PHO; 43 | HOM; DNQ | | | | 44th | 915 | |
| 2000 | Fenley-Moore Motorsports | 15 | Ford | DAY; 41 | CAR | LVS; 37 | ATL; 19 | DAR; DNQ | BRI | TEX | MAR | TAL | CAL | RCH | CLT | DOV | MCH | POC | SON | DAY | NHA | POC | IND | GLN | MCH | BRI | DAR | RCH | NHA | DOV | MAR | CLT | TAL | CAR | PHO | HOM | ATL | | | 57th | 198 | |
| 2001 | Quest Motor Racing | 37 | Pontiac | DAY; DNQ | CAR | LVS | ATL | DAR | BRI | TEX | MAR | TAL | CAL | RCH | CLT; DNQ | DOV | MCH | POC | SON | DAY | CHI | NHA | POC | IND; DNQ | GLN | MCH | BRI | DAR | RCH | DOV | | | | | | | | | | 60th | 91 | |
| 2001 | Team CLR | 57 | Ford | | | | | | | | | | | | | | | | | | | | | | | | | | | | KAN; 24 | CLT; DNQ | MAR | TAL | PHO | CAR | HOM; DNQ | ATL | NHA | 60th | 91 | |
| 2002 | Team CLR | 57 | Ford | DAY | CAR | LVS; DNQ | ATL | DAR | BRI | TEX | MAR | TAL | CAL | RCH | | | | | | | | | | | | | | | | | | | | | | | | | | 53rd | 361 | |
| 2002 | Quest Motor Racing | 37 | Ford | | | | | | | | | | | | CLT; DNQ | DOV; DNQ | POC | MCH; 38 | SON | DAY | CHI | NHA | POC; 35 | IND; DNQ | GLN | | | | | | | | | | | | | | | 53rd | 361 | |
| 2002 | BAM Racing | 49 | Dodge | | | | | | | | | | | | | | | | | | | | | | | MCH; 37 | BRI; 41 | DAR | RCH | NHA | DOV | KAN | TAL | CLT | MAR | ATL; 37 | CAR | PHO; 38 | HOM; 34 | 53rd | 361 | |
| 2003 | Quest Motor Racing | 37 | Chevy | DAY; DNQ | CAR; 43 | LVS; 29 | ATL | DAR | BRI; 43 | TEX | TAL | MAR; 42 | CAL; 43 | RCH; DNQ | CLT; DNQ | DOV; DNQ | POC; DNQ | MCH; 40 | SON | DAY | CHI; 43 | NHA; 35 | POC; 42 | IND; 36 | GLN | MCH; 34 | BRI; DNQ | DAR; 39 | RCH | NHA; DNQ | DOV; 35 | TAL | KAN; 38 | CLT; 37 | MAR; 42 | ATL; 40 | PHO; DNQ | CAR; 43 | | 46th | 822 | |
| 2003 | Arnold Motorsports | 79 | Dodge | | | | | | | | | | | | | | | | | | | | | | | | | | | | | | | | | | | | HOM; DNQ | 46th | 822 | |
| 2004 | Arnold Motorsports | 50 | Dodge | DAY; 30 | CAR; 30 | LVS; 33 | ATL; 38 | DAR; 25 | BRI; 26 | TEX; 37 | MAR; 33 | TAL; 38 | CAL; 31 | RCH; 29 | CLT; 34 | DOV | POC | | | | | | | | | | | | | | | | | | | | | | | 40th | 1058 | |
| 2004 | SCORE Motorsports | 02 | Chevy | | | | | | | | | | | | | | | MCH; 42 | SON | | | | | | | | | | | | | | | | | | | | | 40th | 1058 | |
| 2004 | W.W. Motorsports | 94 | Dodge | | | | | | | | | | | | | | | | | DAY; DNQ | CHI | NHA | POC | | | | | | | | | | | CLT; DNQ | MAR | ATL; DNQ | PHO | | | 40th | 1058 | |
| 2004 | Mach 1 Motorsports | 98 | Ford | | | | | | | | | | | | | | | | | | | | | IND; 40 | GLN | MCH; 41 | BRI; 38 | | RCH; 42 | NHA | | | | | | | | | | 40th | 1058 | |
| 2004 | Mach 1 Motorsports | 96 | Ford | | | | | | | | | | | | | | | | | | | | | | | | | CAL; 40 | | | | | | | | | | | | 40th | 1058 | |
| 2004 | Hover Motorsports | 80 | Ford | | | | | | | | | | | | | | | | | | | | | | | | | | | | DOV; DNQ | TAL | KAN | | | | | | | 40th | 1058 | |
| 2004 | W.W. Motorsports | 94 | Ford | | | | | | | | | | | | | | | | | | | | | | | | | | | | | | | | | | | DAR; DNQ | HOM | 40th | 1058 | |
| 2005 | SWAT Racing | 55 | Chevy | DAY; DNQ | CAL | LVS | ATL | BRI | MAR | TEX | PHO | TAL | DAR | RCH | CLT | DOV | POC | | | | | | | | | | | | | | | | | | | | | | | 81st | 64 | |
| 2005 | Conely Racing | 79 | Chevy | | | | | | | | | | | | | | | MCH; DNQ | SON | DAY | CHI | | | | | | | | | | | | | | | | | | | 81st | 64 | |
| 2005 | Rick Ware Racing | 52 | Dodge | | | | | | | | | | | | | | | | | | | NHA; DNQ | POC; DNQ | IND | GLN | MCH | BRI | CAL | RCH | NHA | DOV | TAL | KAN | CLT | | | | | | 81st | 64 | |
| 2005 | McGlynn Racing | 08 | Chevy | | | | | | | | | | | | | | | | | | | | | | | | | | | | | | | | MAR; 33 | ATL | TEX | | | 81st | 64 | |
| 2005 | McGlynn Racing | 00 | Dodge | | | | | | | | | | | | | | | | | | | | | | | | | | | | | | | | | | | PHO; DNQ | HOM; DNQ | 81st | 64 | |
| 2006 | McGlynn Racing | 74 | Dodge | DAY; DNQ | CAL; DNQ | LVS | ATL; DNQ | BRI; DNQ | MAR; DNQ | TEX; 41 | PHO | TAL | RCH; 43 | DAR; 43 | CLT; QL^{†} | DOV; 37 | POC; DNQ | MCH; 43 | SON | DAY | CHI; DNQ | NHA; DNQ | POC; DNQ | | | MCH; 34 | BRI; 43 | CAL | RCH; DNQ | NHA; DNQ | DOV; 43 | KAN | TAL; 43 | CLT; DNQ | MAR; DNQ | ATL; DNQ | TEX; DNQ | PHO; DNQ | HOM; DNQ | 52nd | 317 | |
| 2006 | Front Row Motorsports | 61 | Chevy | | | | | | | | | | | | | | | | | | | | | IND; DNQ | GLN | | | | | | | | | | | | | | | 52nd | 317 | |
| 2007 | McGlynn Racing | 74 | Dodge | DAY; DNQ | CAL | LVS | ATL | BRI | MAR | TEX | PHO | TAL | RCH | DAR | CLT | DOV | POC | MCH | SON | NHA | DAY | CHI | IND | POC | GLN | MCH | BRI | CAL | RCH | NHA | DOV | KAN | TAL | CLT | MAR | ATL | TEX | PHO | HOM | 70th | 0 | |
| 2008 | Derrike Cope Inc. | 75 | Dodge | DAY | CAL | LVS | ATL | BRI | MAR | TEX | PHO | TAL | RCH | DAR | CLT | DOV | POC | MCH | SON | NHA | DAY | CHI | IND | POC | GLN | MCH | BRI | CAL | RCH | NHA | DOV | KAN | TAL | CLT; DNQ | MAR; DNQ | ATL | TEX | PHO | HOM | 83rd | 0 | |
| 2009 | Cope/Keller Racing | 75 | Dodge | DAY; DNQ | CAL | LVS | ATL | BRI | MAR; DNQ | TEX | PHO | TAL | RCH | DAR | CLT | DOV; DNQ | POC; DNQ | MCH | SON | NHA | DAY | CHI | IND; DNQ | POC | GLN | MCH | BRI | ATL | RCH | NHA; DNQ | DOV | KAN | CAL | CLT | | | | | | 66th | 37 | |
| 2009 | Gunselman Motorsports | 64 | Toyota | | | | | | | | | | | | | | | | | | | | | | | | | | | | | | | | MAR; 42 | TAL | TEX | PHO | HOM | 66th | 37 | |
| 2010 | Stratus Racing Group | 75 | Dodge | DAY; DNQ | CAL | LVS | ATL | BRI | MAR | PHO | TEX | TAL | RCH | DAR | DOV | CLT | POC | MCH | SON | NHA | DAY | CHI | IND | POC | GLN | MCH | BRI | ATL | RCH | NHA | DOV | KAN | CAL | CLT | MAR | TAL | TEX | PHO | HOM | 83rd | 0 | |
| 2011 | Max Q Motorsports | 64 | Toyota | DAY; DNQ | PHO | LVS | BRI | CAL | MAR | TEX | TAL | RCH | | | | | | | | | | | | | | | | | | | | | | | | | | | | 82nd | 0^{1} | |
| 2011 | Stratus Racing Group | 75 | Dodge | | | | | | | | | | DAR; Wth | DOV | CLT | KAN | POC | MCH | SON | DAY | KEN | NHA | IND | POC | GLN | MCH | BRI | ATL | RCH | CHI | NHA | DOV | KAN | CLT | TAL | MAR; DNQ | TEX | PHO | HOM | 82nd | 0^{1} | |
| 2017 | Premium Motorsports | 55 | Chevy | DAY | ATL; 36 | LVS; 35 | PHO; 33 | CAL; 38 | MAR | | | | | | | | POC; 33 | MCH | SON | DAY | KEN | NHA | IND | | | | | | | | | | | | | | | | | 37th | 42 | |
| 2017 | Premium Motorsports | 55 | Toyota | | | | | | | TEX; 37 | BRI; 31 | RCH | TAL | KAN; 39 | CLT; 31 | DOV | | | | | | | | POC; 34 | GLN | | | DAR; 32 | | | | | | | | | | | | 37th | 42 | |
| 2017 | Premium Motorsports | 15 | Toyota | | | | | | | | | | | | | | | | | | | | | | | MCH; 39 | BRI | | | | | | | | | | | | | 37th | 42 | |
| 2017 | Premium Motorsports | 15 | Chevy | | | | | | | | | | | | | | | | | | | | | | | | | | RCH; 36 | CHI | NHA | DOV | CLT | TAL | | | | | | 37th | 42 | |
| 2017 | StarCom Racing | 00 | Chevy | | | | | | | | | | | | | | | | | | | | | | | | | | | | | | | | KAN; 40 | MAR | TEX | PHO; 32 | HOM | 37th | 42 | |
| 2018 | StarCom Racing | 99 | Chevy | DAY | ATL | LVS | PHO | CAL | MAR | TEX | BRI | RCH | TAL | DOV; 37 | KAN | CLT | POC; 34 | MCH | SON | CHI | DAY | KEN | NHA | POC | GLN | MCH | BRI | DAR; 33 | IND | LVS | RCH | CLT | DOV | TAL | KAN | MAR | TEX | PHO | HOM | 43rd | 8 | |
| 2021 | Rick Ware Racing | 15 | Chevy | DAY; 40 | DAY | HOM | LVS | PHO | ATL | BRI | MAR | RCH | TAL | KAN | DAR | DOV | COA | CLT | SON | NSH | POC | POC | ROA | ATL | NHA | GLN | IND | MCH | DAY | DAR | RCH | BRI | LVS | TAL | CLT | TEX | KAN | MAR | PHO | 42nd | 1 | |
^{†} - Qualified but slot bought by Michael Waltrip

===== Daytona 500 =====
| Year | Team | Manufacturer | Start | Finish |
|---|---|---|---|---|
| 1987 | Stoke Racing | Ford | 23 | 33 |
| 1988 | Testa Racing | Ford | 22 | 27 |
| 1989 | Testa Racing | Pontiac | DNQ | |
| 1990 | Bob Whitcomb Racing | Chevrolet | 12 | **1** |
| 1991 | Bob Whitcomb Racing | Chevrolet | 33 | 26 |
| 1992 | Bob Whitcomb Racing | Chevrolet | 20 | 34 |
| 1993 | Cale Yarborough Motorsports | Ford | 35 | 29 |
| 1994 | Cale Yarborough Motorsports | Ford | 16 | 21 |
| 1995 | Bobby Allison Motorsports | Ford | 22 | 31 |
| 1996 | Bobby Allison Motorsports | Ford | 22 | 41 |
| 1997 | MB2 Motorsports | Pontiac | 29 | 36 |
| 1998 | Bahari Racing | Pontiac | 11 | 37 |
| 1999 | Bahari Racing | Pontiac | 20 | 18 |
| 2000 | Fenley-Moore Motorsports | Ford | 12 | 41 |
| 2001 | Quest Motor Racing | Pontiac | DNQ | |
| 2003 | Quest Motor Racing | Chevrolet | DNQ | |
| 2004 | Arnold Motorsports | Dodge | 42 | 30 |
| 2005 | SWAT Racing | Chevrolet | DNQ | |
| 2006 | McGlynn Racing | Dodge | DNQ | |
| 2007 | McGlynn Racing | Dodge | DNQ | |
| 2009 | Cope/Keller Racing | Dodge | DNQ | |
| 2010 | Stratus Racing Group | Dodge | DNQ | |
| 2011 | Max Q Motorsports | Toyota | DNQ | |
| 2021 | Rick Ware Racing | Chevrolet | 32 | 40 |

==== Xfinity Series ====
NASCAR Xfinity Series results
| Year | Team | No. | Make | 1 | 2 | 3 | 4 | 5 | 6 | 7 | 8 | 9 | 10 | 11 | 12 | 13 | 14 | 15 | 16 | 17 | 18 | 19 | 20 | 21 | 22 | 23 | 24 | 25 | 26 | 27 | 28 | 29 | 30 | 31 | 32 | 33 | 34 | 35 | NXSC | Pts | Ref |
|---|---|---|---|---|---|---|---|---|---|---|---|---|---|---|---|---|---|---|---|---|---|---|---|---|---|---|---|---|---|---|---|---|---|---|---|---|---|---|---|---|---|
| 1990 | Whitcomb Racing | 10 | Chevy | DAY | RCH | CAR | MAR | HCY | DAR | BRI | LAN | SBO | NZH | HCY | CLT | DOV | ROU | VOL | MYB | OXF | NHA; 32 | SBO | DUB | IRP | ROU | BRI | DAR | RCH | DOV | MAR | CLT | NHA | CAR | MAR | | | | | 104th | 67 | |
| 1994 | Bobby Allison Motorsports | 82 | Ford | DAY | CAR | RCH | ATL | MAR | DAR | HCY | BRI; 8 | ROU | NHA; 1 | NZH | CLT; 37 | DOV | MYB | GLN | MLW; 16 | SBO | TAL; 23 | HCY | IRP | **MCH**; 21 | BRI; 23 | DAR; 12 | RCH; 13 | DOV | CLT; 3 | MAR | CAR; 14 | | | | | | | | 32nd | 1314 | |
| 1995 | Bobby Allison Motorsports | 82 | Ford | DAY; 22 | CAR; 7 | RCH | ATL; 8 | NSV | DAR | BRI | HCY | NHA | NZH | CLT | DOV | MYB | GLN | MLW | TAL | SBO | IRP | MCH | BRI | | | | | | | | | | | | | | | | 52nd | 471 | |
| 1995 | Bobby Jones Racing | 50 | Ford | | | | | | | | | | | | | | | | | | | | | DAR; 42 | RCH | DOV; 39 | CLT; DNQ | CAR | HOM; 41 | | | | | | | | | | 52nd | 471 | |
| 1996 | Champion Racing | 26 | Ford | DAY; 8 | CAR; 21 | RCH | ATL; 12 | NSV | DAR; 18 | BRI; 21 | HCY | NZH | CLT; 7 | DOV | SBO | MYB | GLN | MLW | NHA | TAL; 42 | IRP | MCH | BRI; 6 | DAR; 29 | RCH | DOV | CLT; 37 | CAR; 12 | HOM; 43 | | | | | | | | | | 40th | 1200 | |
| 1998 | Mac Martin Racing | 92 | Chevy | DAY; DNQ | CAR; 24 | LVS | NSV | DAR | BRI; DNQ | TEX | HCY | TAL | NHA | NZH | CLT; DNQ | DOV | RCH; DNQ | PPR | GLN | MLW | MYB | CAL | SBO | IRP | MCH | BRI | DAR | RCH | DOV | CLT | GTY | CAR | | | | | | | 87th | 146 | |
| 1998 | Xpress Motorsports | 61 | Pontiac | | | | | | | | | | | | | | | | | | | | | | | | | | | | | | ATL; 36 | HOM | | | | | 87th | 146 | |
| 1999 | Xpress Motorsports | 61 | Pontiac | DAY; DNQ | CAR; 15 | LVS; 23 | ATL; 35 | DAR | TEX | NSV | BRI | TAL | CAL | NHA | RCH | NZH | CLT | DOV | SBO | GLN | MLW | MYB | PPR | GTY | IRP | MCH | | | | | | | | | | | | | 70th | 380 | |
| 1999 | NorthStar Motorsports | 89 | Chevy | | | | | | | | | | | | | | | | | | | | | | | | BRI; 40 | DAR; 32 | RCH | DOV | CLT; DNQ | CAR | MEM | PHO | HOM | | | | 70th | 380 | |
| 2001 | PF2 Motorsports | 94 | Chevy | DAY | CAR | LVS | ATL | DAR | BRI | TEX | NSH | TAL | CAL | RCH | NHA | NZH | CLT | DOV | KEN | MLW | GLN | CHI; 37 | GTY; 31 | PPR | IRP | MCH; 34 | BRI; 21 | DAR | RCH | DOV | KAN | CLT | MEM | PHO | CAR | HOM | | | 71st | 283 | |
| 2002 | PF2 Motorsports | 94 | Chevy | DAY | CAR | LVS; 31 | DAR; 28 | BRI; 21 | TEX; 32 | NSH; 38 | TAL | CAL | RCH | NHA | NZH | CLT | DOV | NSH | KEN | MLW | DAY | CHI | GTY | PPR | IRP | MCH | | | | | | | | | | | | | 54th | 551 | |
| 2002 | Jay Robinson Racing | 49 | Ford | | | | | | | | | | | | | | | | | | | | | | | | BRI; 36 | | | | | | | | | | | | 54th | 551 | |
| 2002 | Jay Robinson Racing | 49 | Chevy | | | | | | | | | | | | | | | | | | | | | | | | | DAR; 27 | RCH; 38 | DOV | KAN | CLT | MEM | ATL | CAR | PHO | HOM | | 54th | 551 | |
| 2003 | Jay Robinson Racing | 49 | Pontiac | DAY; 13 | CAR | LVS | DAR | BRI | TEX | | | | | | | | | | | | | | | | | | | | | | | | | | | | | | 62nd | 601 | |
| 2003 | Jay Robinson Racing | 49 | Ford | | | | | | | TAL; 14 | NSH | CAL | RCH | GTY | NZH | CLT | DOV; 20 | NSH | KEN | MLW; 30 | DAY; 35 | CHI; 33 | | | | | | | | | | | | | | | | | 62nd | 601 | |
| 2003 | Jay Robinson Racing | 39 | Ford | | | | | | | | | | | | | | | | | | | | NHA; 35 | PPR | IRP | MCH | BRI | DAR | RCH | DOV | KAN | CLT | MEM | ATL | PHO | CAR | HOM | | 62nd | 601 | |
| 2004 | Jay Robinson Racing | 49 | Ford | DAY; 20 | CAR; 37 | LVS; 27 | DAR; 35 | BRI; 30 | TEX; 31 | NSH; 35 | TAL; 41 | CAL; 33 | GTY; INQ^{†} | RCH; 27 | NZH | CLT; 27 | DOV; 27 | NSH; 24 | KEN | MLW; 22 | DAY; 35 | CHI; 38 | NHA; 37 | PPR; 43 | IRP | MCH; 34 | BRI; 24 | CAL; 32 | RCH; 28 | DOV; 32 | KAN; 31 | CLT; 38 | MEM; 32 | ATL; 30 | PHO; 30 | DAR; 30 | HOM; 40 | | 27th | 2050 | |
| 2005 | Jay Robinson Racing | 28 | Ford | DAY; 16 | CAL; 34 | MXC | LVS; 34 | ATL; 29 | NSH; 29 | BRI; 43 | TEX; 21 | PHO; 29 | TAL | DAR; 37 | RCH; 29 | CLT; 42 | DOV | NSH; 35 | KEN | MLW; 33 | DAY; DNQ | CHI | NHA; DNQ | PPR | GTY | IRP | GLN | MCH | BRI; 39 | CAL; DNQ | RCH | | | | | | | | 50th | 932 | |
| 2005 | Jay Robinson Racing | 94 | Ford | | | | | | | | | PHO; DNQ | | | | | | | | | | | | | | | | | | | | DOV; DNQ | | | | | | | 50th | 932 | |
| 2005 | MacDonald Motorsports | 71 | Chevy | | | | | | | | | | | | | | | | | | | | | | | | | | | | | | KAN; DNQ | CLT | MEM | TEX | PHO | HOM | 50th | 932 | |
| 2006 | Jay Robinson Racing | 49 | Ford | DAY | CAL; DNQ | MXC | LVS | ATL | BRI | TEX | NSH | PHO | TAL; 40 | RCH | DAR; DNQ | CLT | DOV; 33 | NSH | KEN | MLW; 34 | DAY | CHI; DNQ | NHA; 36 | MAR | GTY | IRP | GLN | MCH | BRI | CAL; DNQ | RCH | | | CLT; DNQ | MEM | TEX; DNQ | PHO | HOM | 83rd | 287 | |
| 2006 | Jay Robinson Racing | 28 | Chevy | | | | | | | | | | | | | | | | | | | | | | | | | | | | | DOV; 33 | KAN | | | | | | 83rd | 287 | |
| 2007 | Jay Robinson Racing | 28 | Chevy | DAY | CAL | MXC | LVS | ATL | BRI | NSH | TEX | PHO | TAL | RCH; 29 | DAR; 25 | CLT | DOV | NSH | KEN | | | | CHI; 36 | | | | GLN; 35 | MCH | | | RCH; 37 | DOV | KAN | CLT | MEM | TEX | PHO | HOM | 78th | 440 | |
| 2007 | Jay Robinson Racing | 49 | Chevy | | | | | | | | | | | | | | | | | MLW; 43 | NHA | DAY | | GTY; 42 | IRP; 41 | CGV | | | BRI; DNQ | CAL | | | | | | | | | 78th | 440 | |
| 2008 | Means Racing | 52 | Chevy | DAY | CAL; 36 | LVS; 32 | ATL; 37 | BRI; 36 | NSH; 40 | TEX; 37 | PHO; 35 | | | RCH; 33 | | | | | | | | | | | | | | | | | | | | | | | | | 31st | 1765 | |
| 2008 | Jay Robinson Racing | 49 | Chevy | | | | | | | | | MXC; DNQ | TAL | | | | | NSH; QL^{‡} | | MLW; 38 | | | | | | CGV; 43 | GLN; DNQ | | | | | | | | | | | | 31st | 1765 | |
| 2008 | Jay Robinson Racing | 4 | Chevy | | | | | | | | | | | | DAR; 32 | CLT; 34 | DOV; 24 | NSH; 36 | KEN; 31 | | NHA; 30 | DAY; 28 | CHI; 38 | GTY; 34 | IRP; 38 | | | MCH; 25 | BRI; 39 | CAL; 30 | RCH; 31 | DOV; 32 | KAN; 37 | CLT; 43 | MEM; 26 | TEX; 34 | | | 31st | 1765 | |
| 2008 | Jay Robinson Racing | 82 | Chevy | | | | | | | | | | | | | | | | | | | | | | | | | | | | | | | | | | PHO; DNQ | | 31st | 1765 | |
| 2008 | CFK Motorsports | 78 | Dodge | | | | | | | | | | | | | | | | | | | | | | | | | | | | | | | | | | | HOM; DNQ | 31st | 1765 | |
| 2009 | Rick Ware Racing | 41 | Chevy | DAY; DNQ | CAL; 43 | LVS; DNQ | BRI | TEX | NSH | PHO | TAL | | | | | | | | | | | | | | | | | | | | | | | | | | | | 67th | 619 | |
| 2009 | Derrike Cope Inc. | 73 | Dodge | | | | | | | | | RCH; 22 | DAR; DNQ | CLT; 34 | DOV | NSH | KEN; 22 | MLW; 40 | NHA; 37 | DAY | CHI; 36 | GTY; 38 | IRP | | | | BRI; 26 | CGV | ATL; DNQ | RCH; DNQ | DOV | KAN; DNQ | CAL; 39 | CLT; DNQ | MEM | TEX | PHO | HOM | 67th | 619 | |
| 2009 | Derrike Cope Inc. | 78 | Dodge | | | | | | | | | | | | | | | | | | | | | IOW; DNQ | GLN | MCH; DNQ | | | | | | | | | | | | | 67th | 619 | |
| 2010 | Stratus Racing Group, Inc. | 73 | Dodge | DAY; DNQ | CAL; 36 | LVS; DNQ | BRI; 28 | NSH; 26 | PHO; 37 | TEX; DNQ | TAL; DNQ | RCH; 42 | DAR; 42 | DOV | CLT; DNQ | NSH; 41 | KEN; 26 | ROA | NHA | DAY; 38 | CHI | GTY; DNQ | IRP | IOW | GLN | MCH; 39 | BRI; 39 | CGV | ATL | RCH; 42 | DOV; 34 | KAN | CAL | CLT | GTY | TEX | PHO | HOM | 58th | 709 | |
| 2011 | Jay Robinson Racing | 28 | Chevy | DAY; 25 | PHO; 23 | LVS; 25 | BRI; 23 | CAL; 31 | TEX; 32 | TAL; 27 | | | DAR; 24 | DOV; 27 | IOW | CLT; 30 | CHI; 23 | MCH; 28 | ROA; 17 | DAY; 29 | KEN; 25 | NHA; 31 | NSH; 25 | IRP; 22 | IOW; 30 | GLN; 30 | | BRI; 25 | ATL; 24 | RCH; 21 | CHI; 32 | | | CLT; 24 | TEX; 30 | PHO; 32 | | | 20th | 559 | |
| 2011 | Jay Robinson Racing | 28 | Dodge | | | | | | | | NSH; 30 | RCH; 29 | | | | | | | | | | | | | | | CGV; 35 | | | | | DOV; 26 | KAN; 30 | | | | HOM; 30 | | 20th | 559 | |
| 2012 | CFK Motorsports | 73 | Chevy | DAY; DNQ | PHO | | BRI; DNQ | CAL | TEX | RCH | TAL | | | | | | | | | | | | | | | | | | | | | | | | PHO; 24 | HOM | | | 63rd | 49 | |
| 2012 | Robinson-Blakeney Racing | 28 | Dodge | | | LVS; 32 | | | | | | | | | | | | | | | | | | | | | | | | | | | | | | | | | 63rd | 49 | |
| 2012 | Robinson-Blakeney Racing | 70 | Dodge | | | | | | | | | DAR; 27 | IOW | CLT | DOV | MCH | ROA | KEN | DAY | NHA | CHI | IND | IOW | GLN | CGV | BRI | ATL | RCH | CHI | KEN | DOV | CLT | KAN | TEX | | | | | 63rd | 49 | |
| 2013 | Creation-Cope Racing | 73 | Chevy | DAY | PHO | LVS | BRI | CAL | TEX | RCH | TAL | DAR; DNQ | CLT | DOV | IOW | MCH | ROA | KEN; 39 | DAY | NHA | CHI | IND | IOW | GLN | MOH | BRI | ATL | RCH; DNQ | CHI | KEN | DOV | KAN | CLT; DNQ | TEX | | | | | 80th | 14 | |
| 2013 | ML Motorsports | 70 | Chevy | | | | | | | | | | | | | | | | | | | | | | | | | | | | | | | | PHO; 35 | HOM | | | 80th | 14 | |
| 2014 | Derrike Cope Racing | 70 | Chevy | DAY; 37 | PHO; 34 | LVS; 35 | BRI; 28 | CAL; 28 | TEX; 38 | DAR; 29 | RCH; 28 | TAL; DNQ | IOW; 37 | CLT; 36 | DOV; 24 | MCH; 35 | ROA; 33 | KEN; 37 | DAY; 13 | NHA; 28 | CHI; 30 | IND; 34 | IOW; 34 | GLN; 22 | MOH; 32 | BRI; DNQ | ATL; 31 | RCH; DNQ | CHI; 36 | KEN; 33 | DOV; 37 | KAN; 23 | CLT; 25 | TEX; DNQ | PHO; 31 | HOM; DNQ | | | 23rd | 364 | |
| 2015 | Derrike Cope Racing | 70 | Chevy | DAY; DNQ | ATL; 36 | LVS; 33 | PHO; 33 | CAL; 31 | TEX; 36 | BRI; 37 | RCH; 35 | TAL; DNQ | IOW; 29 | CLT; DNQ | DOV; 28 | MCH; 37 | CHI; 35 | DAY; 38 | KEN; 33 | NHA; 32 | IND; 30 | IOW | GLN; 27 | MOH; 25 | BRI; 30 | ROA; 30 | DAR; 32 | RCH | CHI; 31 | KEN; 24 | DOV; 32 | CLT; 32 | KAN; 39 | TEX; 30 | PHO | HOM | | | 26th | 309 | |
| 2016 | Derrike Cope Racing | 70 | Chevy | DAY; DNQ | ATL; 27 | LVS; DNQ | PHO; 34 | CAL; 34 | TEX; 31 | BRI; 34 | RCH; 30 | TAL; DNQ | DOV; 35 | CLT; 32 | POC; 37 | MCH; 31 | IOW; 34 | DAY; DNQ | KEN; 35 | NHA; 35 | IND; 32 | IOW; 33 | GLN; 31 | MOH | BRI; 29 | ROA | DAR; 25 | RCH; 34 | CHI; 37 | KEN; 29 | DOV; 29 | CLT; 36 | KAN; 38 | TEX | PHO | HOM | | | 29th | 202 | |
^{†} - Injured in practice and replaced by Josh Richeson · ^{‡} - Qualified for Shane Hall

==== Camping World Truck Series ====
NASCAR Camping World Truck Series results
| Year | Team | No. | Make | 1 | 2 | 3 | 4 | 5 | 6 | 7 | 8 | 9 | 10 | 11 | 12 | 13 | 14 | 15 | 16 | 17 | 18 | 19 | 20 | 21 | 22 | 23 | 24 | 25 | NCWTC | Pts | Ref |
|---|---|---|---|---|---|---|---|---|---|---|---|---|---|---|---|---|---|---|---|---|---|---|---|---|---|---|---|---|---|---|---|
| 1995 | Bobby Allison Motorsports | 32 | Ford | PHO | TUS | SGS | MMR | POR | EVG | I70 | LVL | BRI | MLW | CNS | HPT | IRP | FLM | RCH; 7 | MAR | NWS | SON | MMR | PHO | | | | | | 72nd | 146 | |
| 2000 | Impact Motorsports | 86 | Dodge | DAY | HOM | PHO | MMR | MAR | PIR | GTY | MEM | PPR | EVG | TEX | KEN | GLN | MLW | NHA | NZH | MCH | IRP | NSV | CIC | RCH | DOV | TEX; 23 | CAL; 28 | | 79th | 173 | |
| 2001 | Impact Motorsports | 86 | Ford | DAY; 16 | HOM; 23 | MMR | MAR | GTY | DAR | PPR | DOV | TEX | MEM | MLW | KAN | KEN | NHA | IRP | NSH | CIC | NZH | RCH | SBO | TEX | LVS | PHO | CAL | | 71st | 209 | |
| 2003 | Troxell-MacDonald Racing | 93 | Chevy | DAY | DAR | MMR | MAR | CLT | DOV | TEX | MEM | MLW | KAN | KEN | GTY | MCH | IRP | NSH | BRI | RCH | NHA | CAL | LVS | SBO | TEX | MAR | PHO | HOM; DNQ | NA | - | |
| 2004 | Ron Rhodes Racing | 48 | Dodge | DAY | ATL | MAR | MFD | CLT; DNQ | DOV | TEX | MEM | MLW | KAN | KEN | GTY | MCH | IRP | NSH | BRI | RCH | NHA | LVS | CAL | TEX | MAR | PHO; 22 | DAR | HOM; DNQ | 92nd | 97 | |
| 2005 | Ron Rhodes Racing | 48 | Dodge | DAY; DNQ | CAL; DNQ | ATL; DNQ | MAR | GTY | MFD | CLT | DOV | TEX | MCH | MLW | KAN | KEN | MEM | IRP | NSH | BRI | RCH | NHA | LVS | MAR | ATL | TEX | PHO | HOM | NA | - | |
| 2006 | Key Motorsports | 40 | Chevy | DAY | CAL | ATL | MAR | GTY | CLT | MFD | DOV | TEX | MCH | MLW | KAN | KEN | MEM | IRP | NSH | BRI | NHA | LVS | TAL; 27 | MAR | ATL; 28 | TEX | PHO | HOM | 66th | 161 | |
| 2007 | Pennington Motorsports | 7 | Chevy | DAY; 33 | CAL | ATL | MAR | KAN | CLT | MFD | DOV | | | | | | | | | | | | | | | | | | 51st | 413 | |
| 2007 | Xpress Motorsports | 16 | Ford | | | | | | | | | TEX; 31 | MCH | MLW | MEM | KEN | IRP | NSH | BRI; 29 | GTY; 29 | NHA | LVS | TAL; 12 | MAR | ATL | TEX | PHO | HOM | 51st | 413 | |
| 2008 | Derrike Cope Inc. | 74 | Dodge | DAY | CAL | ATL | MAR | KAN | CLT; 36 | MFD | DOV | TEX | MCH | MLW | MEM | KEN | IRP; 33 | NSH | BRI | GTY | NHA | LVS | TAL | MAR | ATL | TEX | PHO | HOM | 76th | 119 | |
| 2010 | Stratus Racing Group | 74 | Dodge | DAY; DNQ | ATL | MAR | NSH | KAN | DOV | CLT | TEX | MCH | IOW | GTY | IRP | POC | NSH | DAR | BRI | CHI | KEN; DNQ | NHA | LVS | MAR | TAL | TEX | PHO | HOM | NA | - | |

==== Winston West Series ====
NASCAR Winston West Series results
| Year | Team | No. | Make | 1 | 2 | 3 | 4 | 5 | 6 | 7 | 8 | 9 | 10 | 11 | 12 | 13 | 14 | NWWSC | Pts | Ref |
|---|---|---|---|---|---|---|---|---|---|---|---|---|---|---|---|---|---|---|---|---|
| 1981 | Jefferson Racing | 95 | Ford | RSD | S99 | AAS | MMR | RSD | LAG | **POR**; 6 | WSP; 18 | EVG; 16 | SHA | RSD; 27 | SON | RSD | PHO | 16th | 188 | |
| 1982 | Jefferson Racing | 95 | Ford | MMR | S99 | AAS | RSD | POR; 5 | | | | | | | RSD; 36 | PHO; 14 | | 22nd | 158 | |
| 1982 | Jefferson Racing | 85 | Ford | | | | | | WSP; 14 | SHA | EVG | SON | CDR | RSD | | | | 22nd | 158 | |
| 1983 | Jefferson Racing | 95 | Ford | S99 | SON | RSD | YAK; 2* | EVG; 5* | SHA | RSD | CPL; 12 | RSD | PHO; 5 | | | | | 18th | 180 | |
| 1984 | Jefferson Racing | 95 | Ford | RSD; 15 | YAK; 9 | SIR; 5 | POR; 1 | EVG; 2 | SHA; 1* | | SON; 8 | MMR; 5 | RSD; 18 | PHO; 16 | | | | 2nd | 526 | |
| 1984 | Jefferson Racing | 7 | Ford | | | | | | | WSR; 3 | | | | | | | | 2nd | 526 | |
| 1985 | Jefferson Racing | 07 | Ford | SON; 5 | SHA; 13 | RSD; 15 | MMR; 20 | SIR; 3 | POR; 15 | **STA**; 17 | YAK; 13 | EVG; 1* | WSR; 15 | MMR; 18 | RSD; 19 | | | 9th | 492 | |
| 1986 | Autosports Enterprises | 79 | Ford | SON | RSD; 31 | EVG; 21 | RCS | **TAC**; 2* | **PIR**; 3 | **WSR**; 2 | RSD; 41 | | | | | | | 9th | 269 | |
| 1987 | Kieper Racing | 84 | Pontiac | SON | RSD | SGP | EVG; 4 | | | | | | | | | | | 19th | 151 | |
| 1987 | Kieper Racing | 98 | Pontiac | | | | | POR; 18 | TAC | MMR | | | | | | | | 19th | 151 | |
| 1987 | Stoke Racing | 93 | Chevy | | | | | | | | RSD; 20 | | | | | | | 19th | 151 | |
| 1988 | Kieper Racing | 98 | Chevy | SON | MMR | RSD | SGP | POR; 1 | EVG; 25 | MMR; 21 | PHO | | | | | | | 27th | 116 | |
| 1989 | Midgley Racing | 09 | Chevy | MAD | MMR | RAS | SON | POR | TCR | EVG; 4 | MMR | SGS | SON | PHO | | | | 35th | 160 | |
| 1990 | Whitcomb Racing | 10 | Chevy | MMR | SON | SGS | POR; 4 | EVG | RAS | TCR | MMR | PHO | | | | | | 35th | 160 | |

^{*} Season still in progress
^{1} Ineligible for series points

=== 24 Hours of Daytona ===
(key)

24 Hours of Daytona results
| Year | Class | No | Team | Car | Co-drivers | Laps | Position | Class Pos. |
|---|---|---|---|---|---|---|---|---|
| 1991 | GTP | 4 | (United States) Tom Milner Racing | Spice SE89P- Chevy | (United States) Brian Bonner (United States) Jeff Kline (United States) Scott Sharp | 611 | 11 | 4 |
| 2002 | GT | 33 | (United States) Scuderia Ferrari of Washington | Ferrari 360 Modena | (United States) Cort Wagner (United States) Bill Auberlen (Italy) Constantino Bertuzzi | 572 | 25 | 14 |
| 2003 | SRPII | 21 | (United States) Archangel Motorsport Services | Lola B2K/40- Nissan | (United States) Larry Oberto (United States) Chris Bingham (United States) Brian DeVries | 589 | 18 ^{DNF} | 3 ^{DNF} |

Achievements
| Preceded by Darrell Waltrip | Daytona 500 Winner; 1990 | Succeeded by Ernie Irvan |
