= 2004 Banquet 400 =

Auto race run in Kansas in 2004

Race details
- Race 30 of 36 in the 2004 NASCAR Nextel Cup Series season
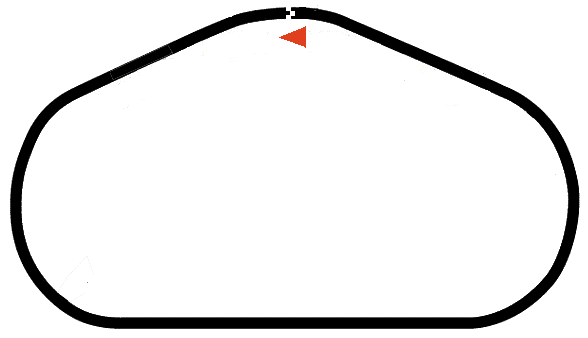
- Layout of Kansas Speedway
- Date: October 10, 2004
- Location: Kansas Speedway, Kansas City, Kansas
- Course: Permanent racing facility
- Course length: 1.5 miles (2.4 km)
- Distance: 267 laps, 400.5 mi (644.5 km)
- Weather: Mild with temperatures approaching 70 °F (21 °C); wind speeds reached a maximum sustained speed of 13 miles per hour (21 km/h)
- Average speed: 128.085 miles per hour (206.133 km/h)
- Attendance: 90,000

Pole position
Driver	Joe Nemechek	MB2 Motorsports

Most laps led
Driver	Jeremy Mayfield	Evernham Motorsports
- Laps: 79

Winner
No. 01	Joe Nemechek	MB2 Motorsports

Television in the United States
- Network: NBC
- Announcers: Bill Weber, Benny Parsons, Wally Dallenbach Jr.

Radio in the United States
- Radio: MRN
- Booth announcers: Joe Moore and Barney Hall
- Turn announcers: Dave Moody (1 & 2) and Mike Bagley (3 & 4)

The 2004 Banquet 400 was a NASCAR Nextel Cup Series race that took place on October 10, 2004, at Kansas Speedway in Kansas City, Kansas. The race was won from the pole by Joe Nemechek, his final trip to victory lane in NASCAR. Ricky Rudd finished 2nd and Greg Biffle came in 3rd.

== Race report ==
Joe Nemechek would defeat Ricky Rudd by just one car length (.081 of a second) in front of 90,000 fans. Nemechek won the pole position for the race at just over 180 miles per hour (290 km/h) during Friday's qualifying session. The race took three hours to complete and nine caution periods slowed the race for 39 laps. The race began at approximately 2:00 PM EDT and concluded at approximately 5:07 PM EDT. At an interview done in 2012, Nemechek praised NASCAR's then-lenient rules on "vehicle innovation" that allowed him to acquire his fourth (and final) NASCAR Cup Series victory.

Sterling Marlin had problems in the pits and came out with a terrible 34th-place finish due to a crash. Kirk Shelmerdine received the last-place finish on the third lap of this 267-lap race due to a problem with his clutch. Shane Hmiel would make the best finish in his NASCAR career to date with a respectable 24th-place finish. Veteran driver Larry Gunselman would make his final Nextel Cup Series start. He would attempt the next two Daytona 500 races and make several starts in the Busch and Craftsman Truck Series before becoming the owner of Max Q Motorsports; a NASCAR Sprint Cup Series team that is currently inactive.

Kyle Busch crashed out for the second time in his fourth career start in 2004. Oddly enough, neither of his first two crashouts directly resulted in cautions coming out for his wrecks. At Las Vegas, he smacked the outside wall twice very early on. The hits weren't hard enough to spray debris but they were enough to force the crew to park the car after Kyle limped it back to the pits. Here at Kansas, Kyle hit the outside wall in the trioval and knocked a brake rotor out of his car, which was promptly run over by a trailing Mark Martin. Kyle slowed on the track without any visibly significant cosmetic damage while Mark had to pit after one more lap with two flat tires, finally prompting a caution for the debris. Mark was almost instantly bailed out thanks to a caution just after the ensuing restart, earning him the lucky dog, but Kyle had to drive his car straight to the back of the hauler due to the terminal brake system damage.

This was the fifth and final NASCAR Cup Series race for owner Dave Watson, the owner of W.W. Motorsports.

Purse monies for each driver ranged from $279,725 ($465,666.23 when adjusted for inflation) to $63,212 ($105,230.83 when adjusted for inflation). Kansas Speedway awarded a grand total of $3,553,992 to all the drivers who qualified for this event ($5,916,432.42 when adjusted for inflation).

=== Top 10 finishers ===
Pos	Grid	No.	Driver	Manufacturer	Laps	Laps led	Winnings
1	1	01	Joe Nemechek	Chevrolet	267	41	$279,725
2	12	21	Ricky Rudd	Ford	267	2	$177,840
3	6	16	Greg Biffle	Ford	267	64	$147,825
4	11	38	Elliott Sadler	Ford	267	2	$120,875
5	3	19	Jeremy Mayfield	Dodge	267	72	$110,675
6	22	97	Kurt Busch	Ford	267	1	$91,825
7	10	42	Jamie McMurray	Dodge	267	19	$88,800
8	9	88	Dale Jarrett	Ford	267	4	$84,800
9	8	8	Dale Earnhardt Jr.	Chevrolet	267	0	$88,500
10	13	77	Brendan Gaughan	Dodge	267	0	$82,375

== Standings after the race ==
Pos	Driver	Points	Differential
1	Kurt Busch	5685	0
2	Dale Earnhardt Jr.	5656	-29
3	Jeff Gordon	5606	-79
4	Elliott Sadler	5542	-143
5	Mark Martin	5535	-150

Previous race: 2004 EA Sports 500	Nextel Cup Series; 2004 season	Next race: 2004 UAW-GM Quality 500
