= Prelude to the Dream =

Dirt late model race in Rossburg, Ohio

Coordinates: 40°19′6.43″N 84°38′1.79″W

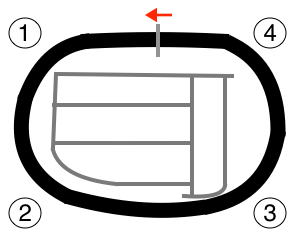
- Venue: Eldora Speedway
- Location: Rossburg, Ohio
- Corporate sponsor: Nextel (2006–2007); Old Spice (2007–2008); Gillette (2009–2010)
- First race: 2005
- Last race: 2012
- Laps: 40 (2012)
- Most wins (driver): Tony Stewart (3)
- Most wins (manufacturer): Chevrolet (6)

Circuit information
- Surface: Clay
- Length: 0.5 mi (0.80 km)

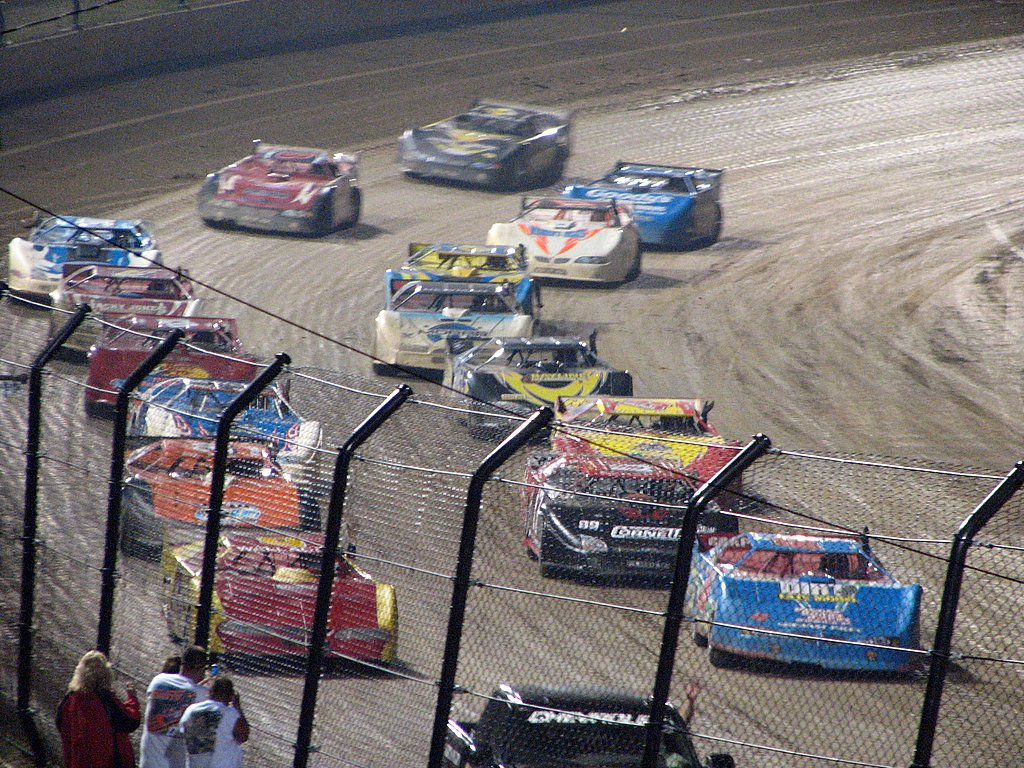
The field prior to the start of the 2006 Prelude to the Dream

The Prelude to the Dream (also known as Prelude to the World in 2006 and 2009) was a dirt late model race held at Eldora Speedway in Rossburg, Ohio from 2005 to 2012. The race's title was a reference to the fact it was held on the Wednesday before the Dirt-late model dream (or World 100 in 2006 and 2009) that was later held that weekend at Eldora Speedway. The race was a pay-per-view event on HBO, and frequently attracted drivers from various disciplines such as NASCAR, IndyCar Series, NHRA, and World of Outlaws.

The Prelude was a charity race, with the 2012 race benefiting Feed the Children, in which money gained from the broadcast was donated to the foundation. Feed the Children also sent food trucks to the hometowns of the top ten finishers in the race. The race has also benefited other charities, such as Victory Junction Gang Camp, which was aided by the Prelude from 2005 to 2008. In 2009, military organizations Fisher House Foundation, Intrepid Fallen Heroes Fund, Operation Homefront and the Wounded Warrior Project were funded by the race. Cincinnati Children's Hospital Medical Center, Levine Children's Hospital, Riley Hospital for Children, St. Jude Children's Research Hospital, Children's Healthcare of Atlanta, Children's Medical Center Dallas and the St. Louis Children's Hospital were the groups benefited from the Prelude. From 2005 to 2011, the Prelude donated a total of $3.5 million to charities.

The race starting grid was determined by 4 heat races of 10 laps each.

== Race history ==
Kenny Wallace, driving the No. 23 Sheltra & Sons Construction Chevrolet, won the inaugural Prelude in 2005 after leading all 25 laps. The 2006 Nextel Prelude to the Dream was postponed from its original date June 7 to September 6 due to rain. In the race, track owner Tony Stewart won. The following year, Jeff Gordon and Carl Edwards battled for much of the race, but Edwards managed to win. In 2008, Stewart held off Robby Gordon to win his second Prelude. The 2009 race was postponed due to rain to September 9; it was won by Stewart once again passing Kenny Wallace on lap 13 and dominated for the remainder of the race, winning with a 3.358-second lead over second-place finisher Clint Bowyer.

The 2010 race featured a new team concept, consisting of four teams representing four children's hospitals being benefited by the race. The teams were:

Team Riley

- Clint Bowyer (captain)
- Ryan Newman
- Jeff Gordon
- A. J. Allmendinger
- Kenny Wallace
- Ron Capps

Team Cincinnati

- Kasey Kahne (captain)
- Joey Logano
- Tony Stewart
- Bobby Labonte
- Bill Elliott
- Cruz Pedregon

Team Levine

- Kyle Busch (captain)
- Jimmie Johnson
- Matt Kenseth
- David Reutimann
- Dave Blaney
- Marcos Ambrose
- Travis Pastrana

Team St. Jude

- Denny Hamlin (captain)
- Carl Edwards
- Ken Schrader
- Aric Almirola
- Ricky Carmichael
- Tony Kanaan
- Ray Evernham

The top five from each team was scored, and if there was a tiebreaker between two teams, the sixth best finisher was also scored. The team with the lowest score won, and its hospital received 45% of the net money gained, the runner-up earned 25%, while the third and fourth place teams received 15%. The race was marred by cautions; three cautions occurred on lap one, followed by four more, and then a final pair of cautions in the final 5 laps. In the end, Jimmie Johnson prevailed, as did Team Levine with 45 points; St. Jude finished second with 48, followed by Cincinnati (49) and Riley (71). The 2011 race also featured the team format, also benefiting children's hospitals.

Team Levine

- Jimmie Johnson
- Denny Hamlin
- Bill Elliott
- David Reutimann
- Austin Dillon
- Ray Evernham
- Cruz Pedregon

Team Atlanta

- Ryan Newman
- Carl Edwards
- Clint Bowyer
- Ken Schrader
- Carl Edwards
- David Gilliland
- Jason Leffler
- Ron Capps

Team St. Louis

- Kyle Busch
- Kasey Kahne
- Bobby Labonte
- Justin Allgaier
- Kenny Wallace
- Ron Hornaday Jr.
- Ricky Carmichael

Team Dallas

- Tony Stewart
- Tony Kanaan
- Matt Kenseth
- Brian Vickers
- Marcos Ambrose
- Aric Almirola
- J. J. Yeley

Clint Bowyer dominated the 2011 race, leading all 30 laps and won with a .531 second margin lead over J. J. Yeley. The following year, the race was expanded from 30 to 40 laps. Clint Bowyer and Kasey Kahne competed for much of the race, but with 16 laps left, Kahne crashed into a spinning Bobby Labonte and Kyle Busch took the lead en route to the win.

On October 18, 2012, Eldora Speedway released a statement that the 2013 Prelude would not be held, citing "logistics associated with the Dream's expansion for the dirt Late Model teams that supplied the cars for the Prelude, along with speedway officials who must transition the facility" as reasons for the exclusion from the 2013 event schedule.

== Past winners ==
Year	Date	Driver	Manufacturer	Race Distance		Ref
Year	Date	Driver	Manufacturer	Laps	Miles (km)	Ref
2005	June 8	Kenny Wallace	Chevrolet	25	12.5 mi (20.1 km)	
2006	September 6	Tony Stewart	Chevrolet (2)	30	15 mi (24 km)	
2007	June 6	Carl Edwards	Ford	30	15 mi (24 km)	
2008	June 4	Tony Stewart (2)	Chevrolet (3)	30	15 mi (24 km)	
2009	September 6	Tony Stewart (3)	Chevrolet (4)	30	15 mi (24 km)	
2010	June 9	Jimmie Johnson	Chevrolet (5)	30	15 mi (24 km)	
2011	June 8	Clint Bowyer	Chevrolet (6)	30	15 mi (24 km)	
2012	June 6	Kyle Busch	Toyota	40	20 mi (32 km)	
