= Eldora Speedway =

Motorsport track in Ohio, United States

The Big E Auto Racing's Showcase since 1954

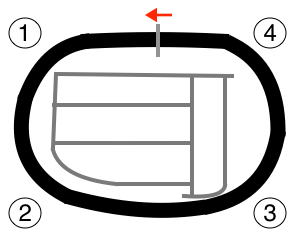
- Oval (1954–present)
- Location: Allen Township, Darke County, near New Weston, Ohio
- Coordinates: 40°19′07″N 84°38′02″W
- Capacity: 30,000
- Owner: Tony Stewart (2004–present)
- Broke ground: 1953
- Opened: 1954
- Architect: Earl Baltes
- Major events: Current: World of Outlaws; Kings Royal (1984–2019, 2021–present); World 100 (1954–present); Former: NASCAR Craftsman Truck Series; Eldora Dirt Derby (2013–2019); Superstar Racing Experience (2021, 2023); Super DIRTcar Series (2016–2017, 2019); Prelude to the Dream (2005–2012)
- Website: http://www.eldoraspeedway.com/

Oval (1954–present)
- Surface: Clay
- Length: 0.500 mi (0.805 km)
- Turns: 4
- Banking: Turns: 24° Straights: 8°
- Race lap record: 0:12.599 (David Gravel, Jason Johnson Racing, 2020, All Star Circuit of Champions)

Eldora Speedway (nicknamed "the Big E", "Auto Racing's Showcase Since 1954," and "World's Greatest Dirt Track") is a 0.500 mi (0.805 km) high-banked clay dirt oval. Located north of Rossburg, Ohio in the village of New Weston, Ohio, its website claims capacity for 22,886 spectators in the permanent grandstand, and unlimited admittance for the grass hillside spectator area. The permanent grandstand and VIP suite seats make it the largest sports stadium in the Dayton, Ohio-region according to the Dayton Business Journal.

Originally constructed as a 0.250 mi (0.402 km) semi-banked clay dirt oval by track founder and promoter Earl Baltes, Eldora was enlarged to a 0.375 mi (0.604 km) length and later to the "half-mile" standard required by the United States Auto Club (USAC) for national championship events featuring the stars of the Indianapolis 500.

The track currently hosts events like the Kings Royal, the World 100, and Stewart's Superstar Racing Experience. From 2013 to 2019, Eldora hosted the NASCAR Gander Outdoors Truck Series' Eldora Dirt Derby. In 2013, the Dirt Late Model Dream and World 100 expanded from one-day shows to full three-day Thursday, Friday, and Saturday race weekend programs which have proven to be hugely popular. The Kings Royal followed suit in 2016.

== History ==
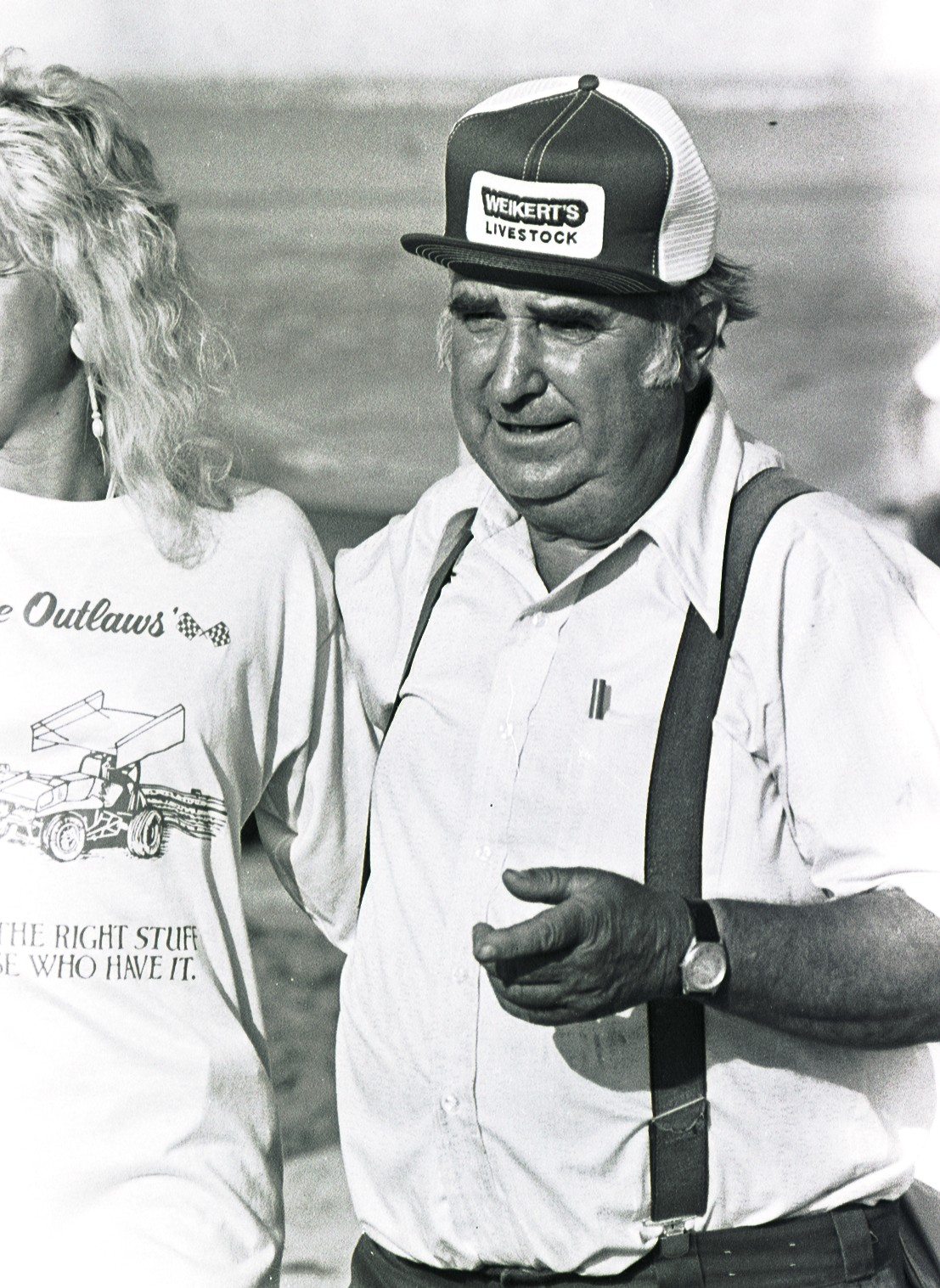
Earl Baltes

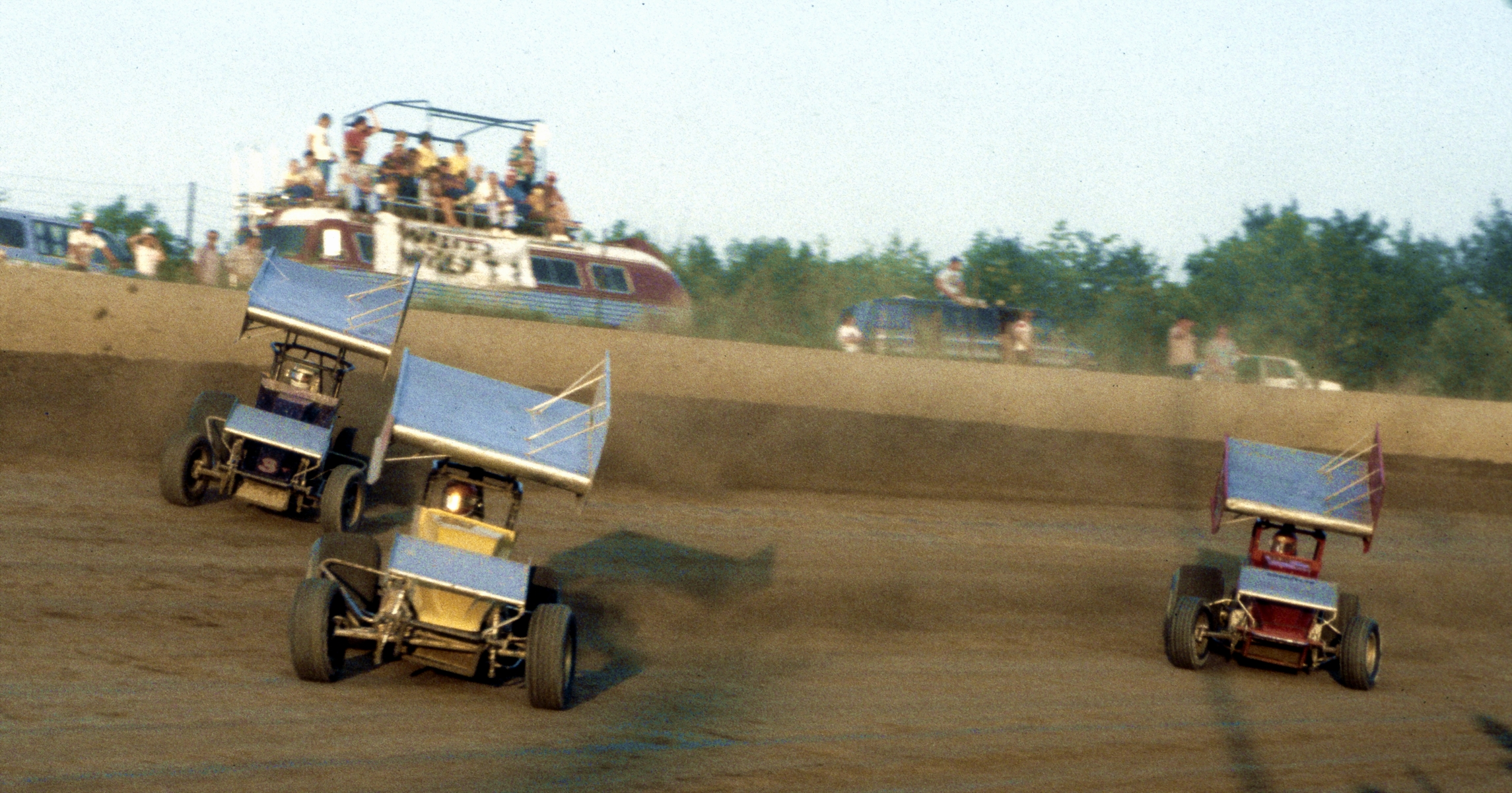
Sprint cars racing in 1986

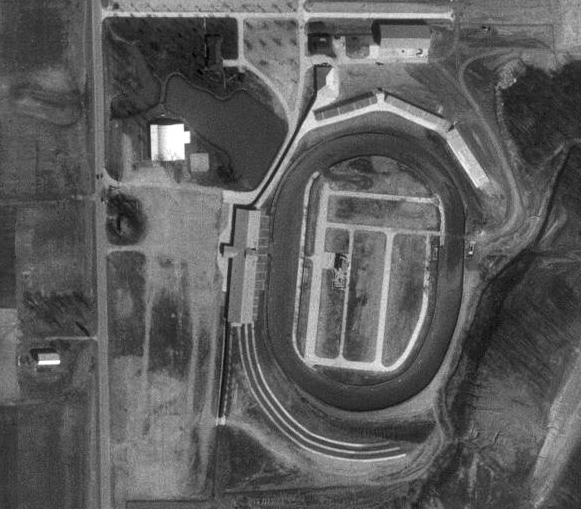
Eldora Speedway from overhead

Eldora Speedway New Weston, OH, was built in 1954 by Earl Baltes, a prominent area bandleader with no previous racing experience. Born on April 27, 1921, in nearby Versailles, Ohio, Baltes had stumbled onto a race at New Bremen Speedway and was so impressed by the big, enthusiastic crowd that he decided to build a race track.

Baltes had purchased the Eldora Ballroom from "Ma" Shoes two years earlier, offering weekly dances and musical performances. Eventually, Baltes curtailed the musical performances as the track grew more successful.

The track was constructed as a quarter-mile as it opened in 1954. Two years later, Baltes expanded the track to a three-eighths-mile, and in 1958 the track was expanded to the present half-mile length.

The track hosted the sprint cars of the United States Auto Club for the first time in 1962 and quickly became one of the favorite venues for the series.

In August 1965, Orville Yeadon won the first Eldora 500, featuring 33 sprint cars running 500 laps. One year later, Larry Cannon won the Eldora 500, and in 1967 Don Nordhorn won the Eldora 500, the last time the race was contested. Baltes was promoting several other tracks by this time, and the 500-lap race fell by the wayside.

In 1971 Baltes shocked the racing fraternity when he held the inaugural World 100, offering an unprecedented purse of $4,000 to the winner. Bruce Gould ultimately won the race. The event is widely considered the birth of the modern "dirt late model" type of racing, which today is one of the most popular forms of racing on America's short tracks.

When the World of Outlaws sprint car series was launched in 1978, Baltes recognized the promotional potential of the group and quickly booked several events at Eldora. It was a key partnership for the fledgling series, giving them much-needed credibility and momentum. In October, Eldora hosted the season finale where Steve Kinser captured the inaugural WoO championship and was proclaimed "King of the Outlaws." In the years that have followed, Eldora has remained a mainstay venue on the WoO circuit and annual King's Royal race.

While the pit wall bore "Home of the Sprint" for many years, Eldora started as a track for "jalopy" cars, then "new cars/stock cars", which eventually into the modern-day dirt late models. In 1971, Baltes posted a $4,000 winner's purse for the "World 100" which many racers and fans thought was a misprint in the advertising. Promising to raise the winner's share by $1,000 every year, the World 100 annually attracts the largest field of dirt late model racers globally. It is Eldora's largest attended event of the season. The 2017 event paid a record purse of $425,800 and attracted the largest crowd in the history of Eldora Speedway – while Eldora does not typically release attendance figures, the winner's share of the Tony Stewart Foundation 50/50 raffle (often an indication of a short-track's attendance as they are sold by hand for $1 per ticket) on that Saturday night was over $38,000.

In the late 1970s, as the crossover between the stars of Indianapolis and USAC dwindled and the era's super-modified cars began to decline, Baltes took notice of a brash Texas promoter named Ted Johnson organizing a "band of outlaw" sprint car drivers racing for larger purses and, in most cases, with aerodynamic wings on their cars. Eldora's high-banks became Ohio and the midwest's home to the World of Outlaws, and, in 1984, Baltes pulled off another one of his firsts when he announced the '$50,000-to-win Kings Royal." In recent years, the event has grown into a three-day extravaganza offering over $385,000 in prize money and awards with regional satellite events in the week leading up to it.

Longtime USAC official, car owner, and sponsor, Johnny Vance of Aristocrat Products in Dayton, Ohio, approached Baltes in 1980 about trying an event in 1981 featuring all four of USAC's divisions in one show and called it the "4-Crown Nationals". At the time, USAC sanctioned the champ cars (a/k/a silver crown), national sprint cars, national sprint tour, and a stock car division similar to NASCAR's Grand National Division. The event was a success and celebrated its 37th running in 2018. It has seen several different iterations over the years. It has not run every year, having been wholly rained out/not rescheduled and replaced by the Mopar Million. When USAC dropped its stock car division, they were replaced by dirt late models, and as the World 100 grew, the late models were replaced by the UMP modifieds. As interest in the event waned, the World of Outlaws was added for a Friday show. USAC's remaining three divisions raced solely on Saturday.

The event is currently undergoing a revival in interest with a weekend full of activity consisting of the World of Outlaws on Friday, USAC's three divisions plus the Tezos All Star Circuit of Champions sprint cars on Saturday, vintage car displays, and three days of racing for 300 USAC .25 midgets competitors and their families at Little Eldora. The 4-Crown Nationals has hosted two of short-track racing's most impressive performances: Jack Hewitt's sweep of the three USAC divisions, and UMP modified feature in one night, and Kyle Larson's sweep of the three USAC divisions (there was not a fourth division that night).

In 2001 Baltes held the "Eldora Million", his defining achievement as a race promoter. Offering a $1 million prize to the winner, the race remains by far the richest short-track race in history. Donnie Moran captured the event and the top money, and was christened "the Million Dollar Man."

Three-time NASCAR Cup Series champion Tony Stewart purchased the speedway in late 2004 from Baltes. Upon his retirement, the state of Ohio honored Baltes by renaming Hwy. 118 "Earl Baltes National Highway" from Ansonia to the south to St. Henry to the north.

In 2011, Stewart hired former Charlotte Motor Speedway vice president of events, Roger Slack, a protégé of the legendary promoter Humpy Wheeler, away from World Racing Group where he had served as executive vice president of the new event promotions department since 2009. Slack leads Eldora's day-to-day operations as general manager and speedway promoter. The historic racing oval has continued an aggressive capital improvement program with state-of-the-art luxury suites atop the turn three area. At the same time, fans also enjoy live coverage and replays of the on-track action via the large video board in turn two. Additional catch fencing, attenuators, a widened pit road, a dedicated helipad for Premier Health's CareFlight and Infield Care Center providing on-site facilities for Level 1 Trauma and ER staff are recent additions to benefit both fan and competitors in recent years.

== Kings Royal ==
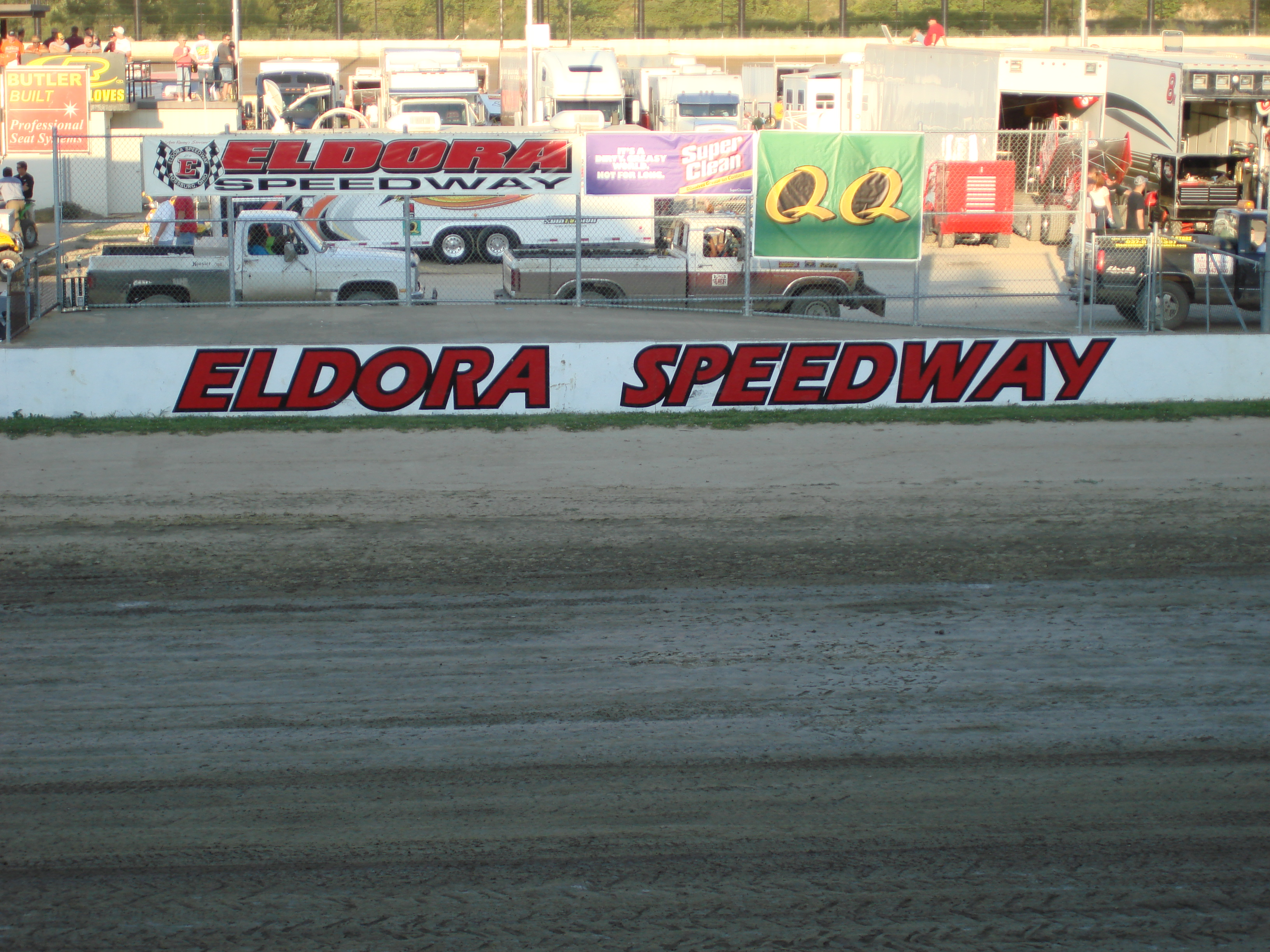
Eldora Speedway during the 2007 Kings Royal

The Kings Royal is one of the biggest sprint car races in America. It paid $50,000 to the winner until the winner's share increased to $175,000 in 2019. The Kings Royal is typically run in July and sanctioned by the World of Outlaws Sprint Car series. The race draws a large field of cars each year and a capacity crowd of sprint car fans from around the globe.

== The Historical Big One ==
Earl Baltes promoted the richest paying sprint car race in the country. The Historical Big One paid $100,000 to win, which was unprecedented for sprint car racing. The race was held from 1993 to 2003. The race returned in 2022 as part of the King's Royal week. The 2023 edition was rebranded the Eldora Million for its $1,002,023 winner's prize.

Winners

- 1993 Jac Haudenschild
- 1994 Kenny Jacobs
- 1995 Steve Kinser
- 1996 Mark Kinser
- 1997 Dave Blaney
- 1998 Dale Blaney
- 1999 Kevin Gobrecht
- 2000 Steve Kinser
- 2001 P.J. Chesson
- 2002 Donny Schatz
- 2003 Daryn Pittman
- 2022 Brent Marks
- 2023 Logan Schuchart

== Dirt Late Model Dream ==
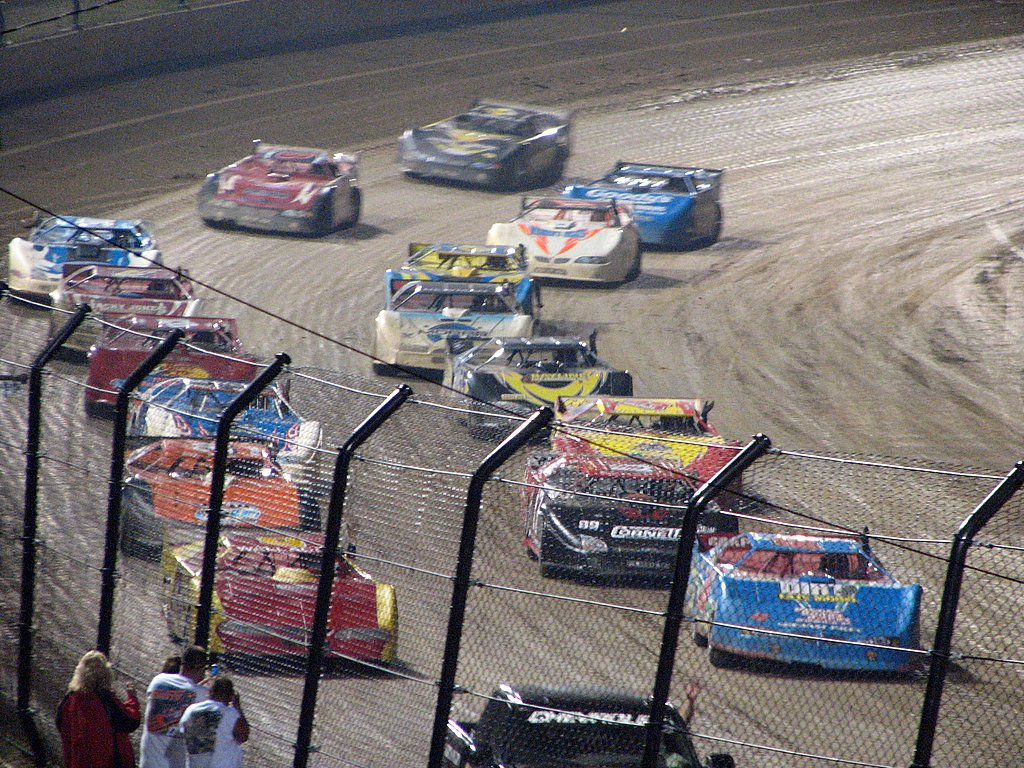
Starting field for the 2006 Prelude to the Dream

The Dirt Late Model Dream is a 100-lap race that has been run annually every June since 1994. The World Racing Group currently sanctions it. The race is noted for its prize money, worth $100,000 for the winner.

The 2013 Ferris Commercial Mowers Dream featured a revised format which provided two full feature race programs on each of the preliminary nights (Thursday, June 6 Winners: Josh Richards, Matt Miller; Friday, June 7 Winners: Matt Miller, Dennis Erb.) 2013's $100,000 Dream winner Scott Bloomquist claimed victory in short track racing's richest event for a record-setting sixth time.

The 2001 rescheduled event featured the "Eldora Million", which paid an unprecedented $1,000,000 to winner Donnie Moran.

In 2020, the "Dirt Late Model Stream Invitational" was the race weekend's title as Dream week was held behind closed doors because of the COVID-19 pandemic, and only paid $50,000 to the winner because it was only available with an iPPV viewing package as there were no spectators. While Billy Moyer has ruled the World 100, Scott Bloomquist has ruled the Dirt Late Model Dream with eight $100,000 victories.

For 2022, the "Eldora Million" returned as a separate feature with a slightly increased prize of $1,002,022.

Winners

- 1994 Freddy Smith, Baton Rouge, Louisiana
- 1995 Scott Bloomquist, Mooresburg, Tennessee
- 1996 Donnie Moran, Dresden, Ohio
- 1997 Jimmy Mars, Elk Mound, Wisconsin
- 1998 Billy Moyer, Batesville, Arkansas
- 1999 Rick Eckert, York, Pennsylvania
- 2000 Freddy Smith, Knoxville, Tennessee
- 2001 Donnie Moran, Dresden, Ohio (Eldora Million)
- 2002 Scott Bloomquist, Mooresburg, Tennessee
- 2003 Darrell Lanigan, Union, Kentucky
- 2004 Scott Bloomquist, Mooresburg, Tennessee
- 2005 Matt Miller, Waterville, Ohio
- 2006 Scott Bloomquist, Mooresburg, Tennessee
- 2007 Steve Casebolt, Richmond, Indiana
- 2008 Scott Bloomquist, Mooresburg, Tennessee
- 2009 Jimmy Owens, Newport, Tennessee
- 2010 Billy Moyer, Batesville, Arkansas
- 2011 Don O'Neal, Martinsville, Indiana
- 2012 Shane Clanton, Fayetteville, Georgia
- 2013 Scott Bloomquist, Mooresburg, Tennessee
- 2014 Shane Clanton, Chickamauga, Georgia
- 2015 Jonathan Davenport, Blairsville, Georgia
- 2016 Dennis Erb, Jr., Carpentersville, Illinois
- 2017 Scott Bloomquist, Mooresburg, Tennessee
- 2018 Scott Bloomquist, Mooresburg, Tennessee
- 2019 Brandon Sheppard, New Berlin, Illinois
- 2020 Tim McCreadie, Watertown, New York (Dirt Late Model Stream Invitational)
- 2021 Brandon Overton, Evans, Georgia (two main events in 2021—Thursday and Saturday, won both)
- 2022 Jonathan Davenport, Blairsville, Georgia (Eldora Million)
- 2022 Brandon Overton, Evans, Georgia
- 2023 Jonathan Davenport, Blairsville, Georgia
- 2024 Jonathan Davenport, Blairsville, Georgia
- 2025 Jonathan Davenport, Blairsville, Georgia

=== Prelude to the Dream ===
From 2005 to 2012, Stewart added a Wednesday night undercard, the Prelude to the Dream, a Nextel-sponsored race with visiting NASCAR Nextel Cup Series stars driving borrowed UMP Late Models. Kenny Wallace won the first Prelude to the Dream and a total of $50,000 to Kyle Petty's Victory Junction Gang Camp.

The race was canceled because of rain in 2006. Stewart won the makeup race, the "Prelude to the World", a reference to the September World 100 late model race (it was now scheduled for that weekend), and celebrated his win by climbing Eldora's new catch fence and jumping into the crowd of fans. Combined, "Prelude" events have attracted more than 40,000 spectators to Eldora Speedway.

The 2007 race returned to the Dirt Late Model Dream feature in June. It featured both a live audience and pay-per-view coverage. Eldora Speedway again donated all proceeds from the coverage to Victory Junction. The NASCAR on Fox crew of Mike Joy, Darrell Waltrip, Dick Berggren, Matt Yocum, and producer Pam Miller were on the broadcast staff as well as NASCAR on TNT booth analyst Kyle Petty. Carl Edwards held off Kyle Busch and Jeff Gordon to win the 2007 event and celebrated by doing his trademark backflip off of his car onto the dirt. Eldora Speedway donated over $800,000 to the charity.

In 2008, the NASCAR on Fox crew of Joy, Waltrip, Berggren, Yocum, and producer Pam Miller returned to the track to call the event for HBO Pay-Per-View along with NASCAR on TNT's booth analyst Kyle Petty. Twenty-three thousand fans attended the race this year as they watched Stewart win the 4th annual charity race. At the end of the race, the Tony Stewart Foundation donated $1,000,000 to the Victory Junction Gang Camps.

The 2009 Prelude to the Dream was set to benefit military charities after track owner Stewart picked up US Army sponsorship on his Stewart–Haas Racing Sprint Cup team—The Wounded Warrior Project, Intrepid Fallen Heroes Fund, Operation Homefront, and Fisher House. Eldora Speedway canceled the 2009 Prelude to the Dream on June 3 because of persistent rain. Once again, a makeup race, the "Prelude to the World," was run on September 9 and won by Stewart.

The 2010 Prelude was won by 6-time Cup champion Jimmie Johnson. Johnson's car was prepared by Clint Bowyer.

On June 8, 2011, Bowyer won the 7th Prelude to the Dream. The HBO pay-per-view revenues from the race will go to four children's hospitals in: St. Louis, Dallas, North Carolina, and Atlanta.

In 2012, the race was extended to 40 laps. Kyle Busch won the 8th Prelude to the Dream, the final running as the event became the Eldora Dirt Derby, a NASCAR-sanctioned national race.

Winners

Year	Date	Driver
2005	June 8	Kenny Wallace
2006	Sept 6	Tony Stewart
2007	June 6	Carl Edwards
2008	June 4	Tony Stewart
2009	Sept 6	Tony Stewart
2010	June 9	Jimmie Johnson
2011	June 8	Clint Bowyer
2012	June 6	Kyle Busch

== World 100 ==
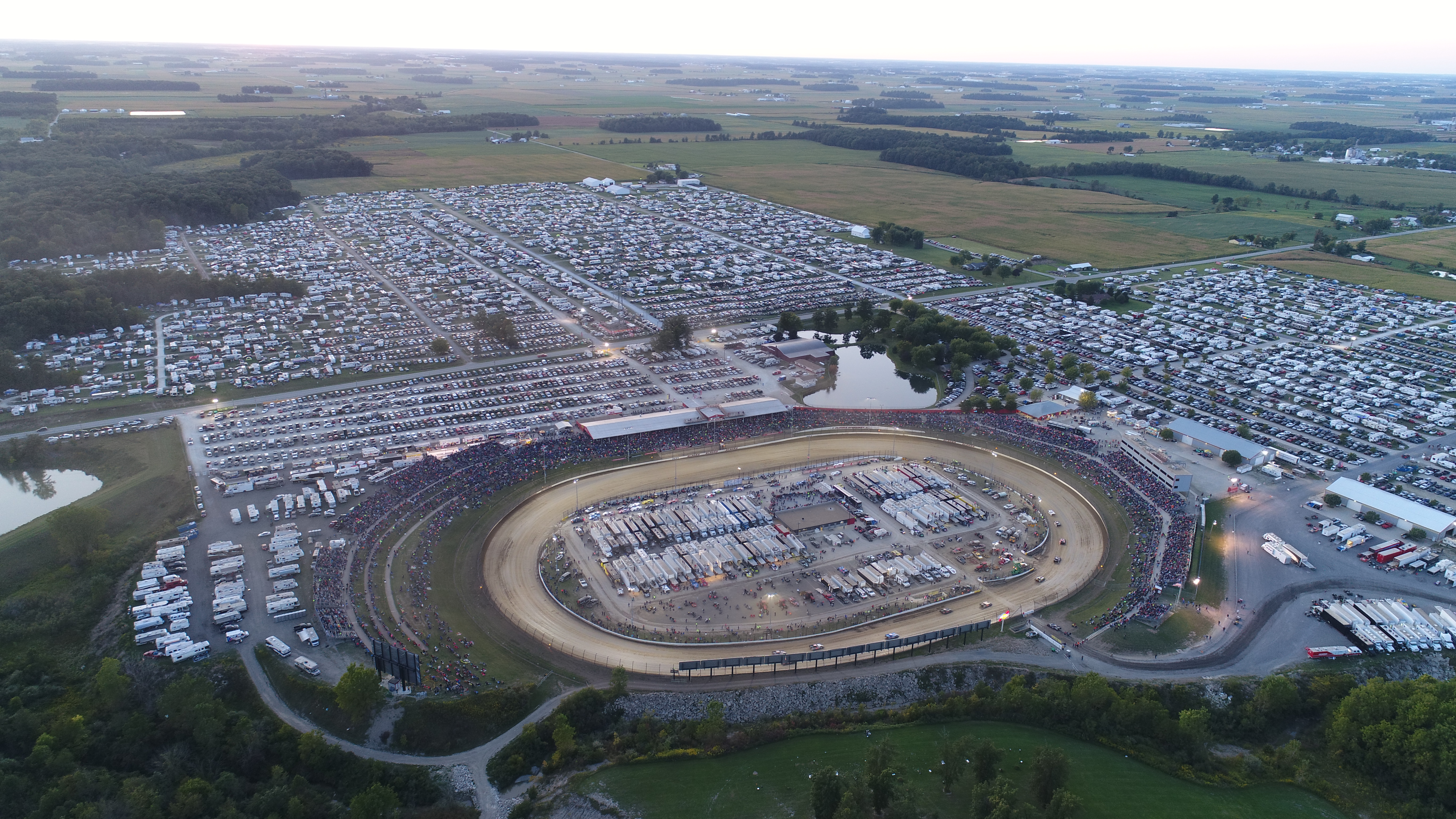
The largest crowd in the 64-year history of Eldora Speedway experiences the 47th running of the World 100 on September 9, 2017.

The World 100 is a 100-lap dirt late model race, and is considered one of the most prolific racing events of each season. It is traditionally run on the weekend following Labor Day in mid September.

Bruce Gould won the inaugural World 100 (September 1971). Billy Moyer leads the headlines in the history of the race with 6 World 100 championships. Following Moyer are four-time champion Donnie Moran and three-time World 100 champs Larry Moore, Jeff Purvis, and Scott Bloomquist. Defending World 100 winner Brian Birkhofer joins Jimmy Owens as the only other racers with more than one win in the prestigious race.

In 2013 Eldora Speedway re-formatted the track's two most prestigious dirt late model races (The World 100 and The Dream) and offered added opportunity and value for competitors and spectators with an expanded schedule of three full nights of competition. Based on the spectacular racing frenzy provided by June's Ferris Commercial Mowers Dirt Late Model DREAM, September's version of the 47th Annual World 100 was as advertised. The 2014 World 100's Thursday and Friday (September 4–5) formats featured full racing programs, including Twin Feature races each night. Then, on Saturday, September 6, the action featured a full complement of preliminary heat races and showdown qualifying events prior to running the 2014 World 100. The feature race was not without controversy as Scott Bloomquist, who had taken the lead, was penalized and sent to the tail for having a plexiglass window net inserted into his driver-side window. Bloomquist stormed through the field and won the 2014 World 100.

The 2022 edition has a winner's prize of $55,000. In addition, the winning driver and owner earn a pair of coveted globed trophies.

== 4-Crown Nationals Weekend ==
The 4-Crown Nationals is the track's late September race card. From 1981 until 2006, the event featured four different races on one night:

USAC

- USAC National Midget Series (1981–2006)
- USAC National Sprint Car Championship (1981–2006)
- USAC Silver Crown Series (1981–2006)
- USAC Stock Car (1981–1983)
- USAC Late Models (1985–1988)

Other

- Late models (1989–1995)
- UMP Modifieds (1996–2007)

In 2007, Tony Stewart changed the format to a two-night format renamed Chevrolet American Revolution Weekend, owing to the ownership of the United Midwest Promoters being owned now by the World Racing Group. The new format has the World Racing Group sanctioned cars on Friday, and the United States Auto Club sanctioned cars on Saturday.

Friday

- UMP Modifieds
- World of Outlaws Sprint Car Series

Saturday

- USAC National Midget Series
- USAC National Sprint Car Championship
- USAC Silver Crown Series
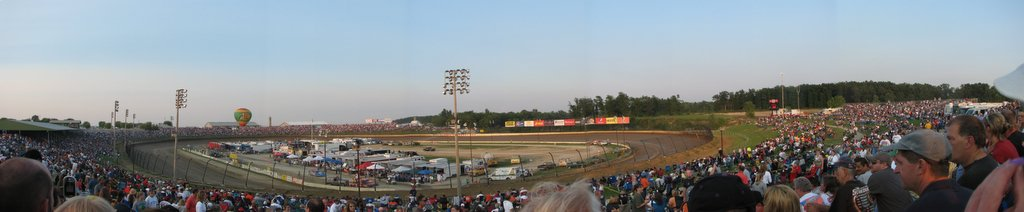
Panorama during the 2006 Prelude to the World

== Eldora Dirt Derby ==
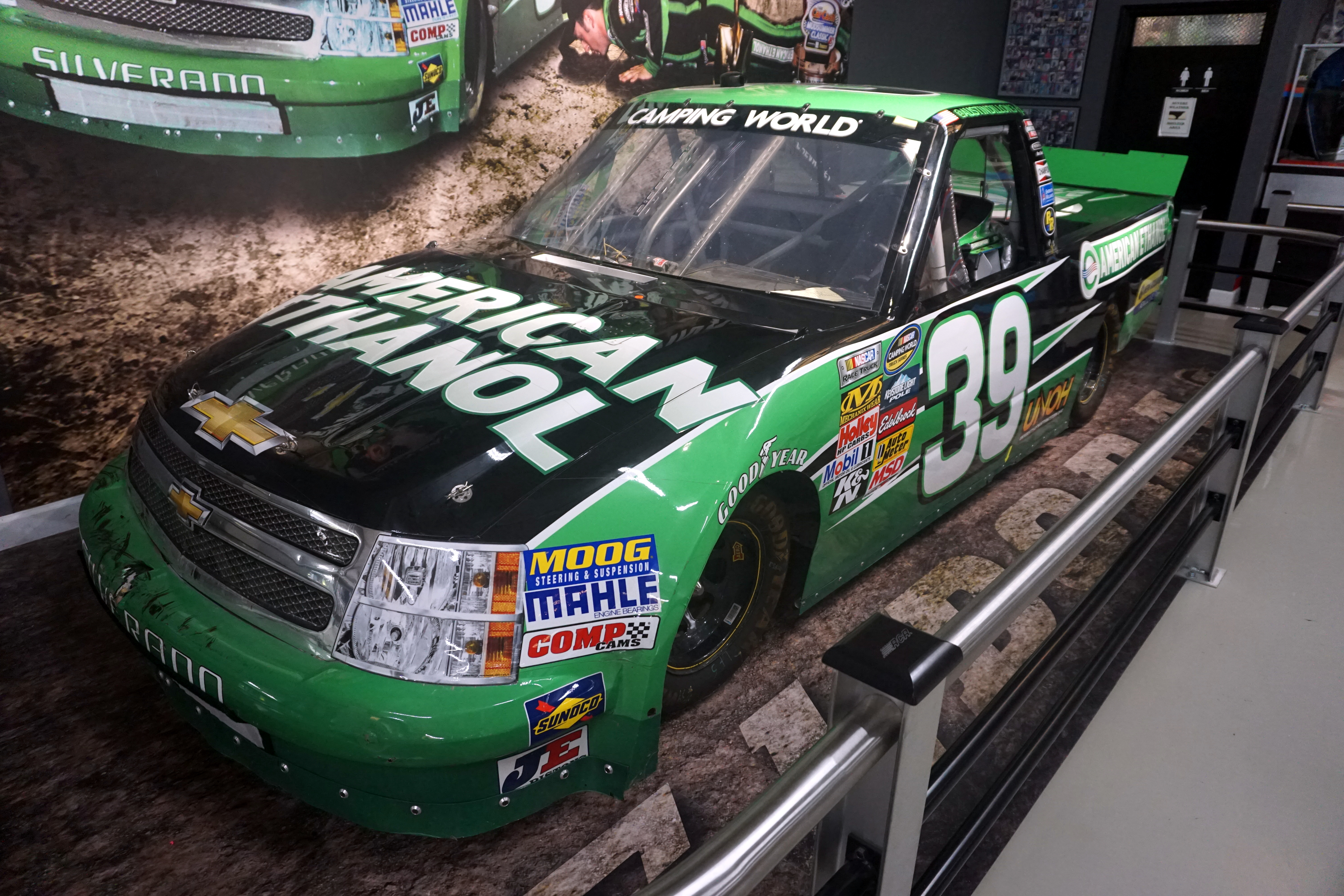
Austin Dillon's 2013 Eldora Speedway-winning No. 39 American Ethanol Chevrolet Silverado

On July 24, 2013, the track hosted the NASCAR Camping World Truck Series race Mudsummer Classic. Though the track does not have any SAFER barriers, NASCAR Director of Safety Tom Gideon stated that the track meets NASCAR safety guidelines. Austin Dillon, the 2011 NASCAR Gander RV & Outdoors truck series champion, driving the No. 39 truck, won the inaugural event, beating Kyle Larson, Ryan Newman, Joey Coulter, and Brendan Gaughan. Several dirt track and Eldora veterans took part in the event, including Dave Blaney, racing alongside his son Ryan, and Truck Series veterans, including Dillon, racing alongside his brother Ty, Ken Schrader, and Ron Hornaday Jr.

After being canceled in 2020 due to state restrictions on large gatherings in response to the COVID-19 pandemic, the Derby was removed from the Truck Series schedule in 2021.

== Superstar Racing Experience ==
The Superstar Racing Experience (SRX), a stock car series co-founded by Stewart, raced at Eldora in 2021. Stewart himself won the event.

== Track Records ==
As of June 2025, the fastest official race lap records at Eldora Speedway are listed as:

Category	Time	Driver	Vehicle	Event
Sprint Car	0:12.599	David Gravel	Sprint Car	2020 All Star Circuit of Champions
Late Model	0:14.761	Brandon Sheppard	Late Model	2018 World 100
USAC Silver Crown	0:15.334	Josh Wise	Silver Crown Car	2005 4-Crown Nationals
Midget Car	0:15.801	Mike Hess	Midget Car	2004 4-Crown Nationals
