= Carl Edwards =

American racing driver (born 1979)

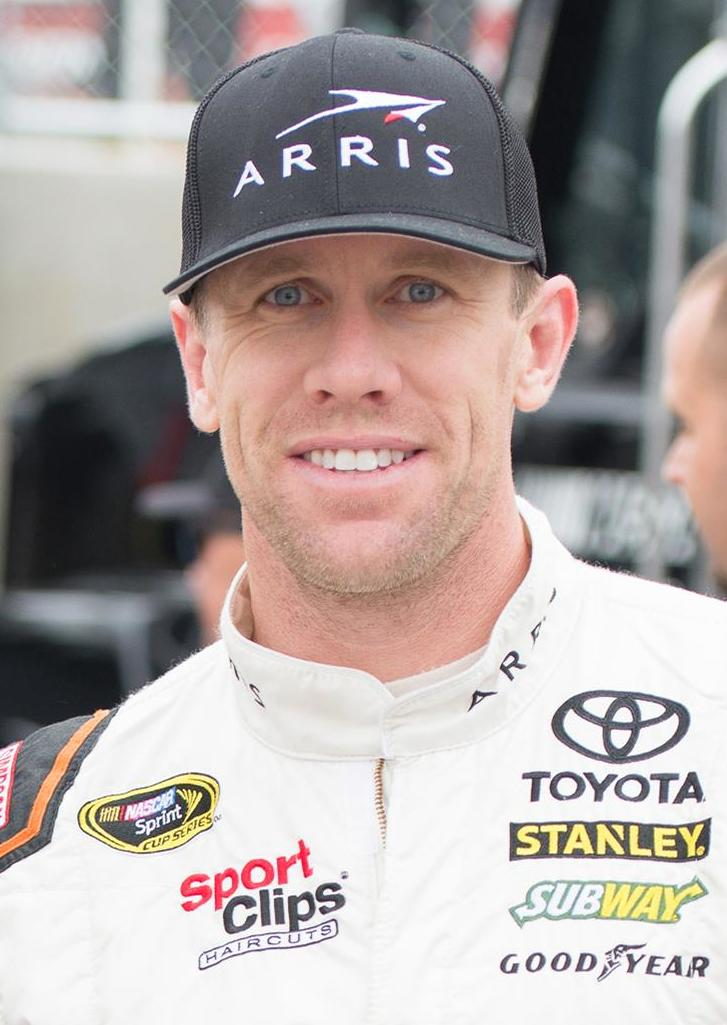
- Edwards at Dover International Speedway in 2016
- Born: Carl Michael Edwards Jr. August 15, 1979 (age 47); Columbia, Missouri, U.S.
- Height: 6 ft 1 in (1.85 m)
- Weight: 185 lb (84 kg)
- Achievements: 2007 NASCAR Busch Series Champion; 2011 NASCAR Sprint All-Star Race Winner; 2007 Prelude to the Dream Winner; 2015 Coca-Cola 600 winner 2015 Southern 500 winner
- Awards: 2005 NASCAR Busch Series Rookie of the Year; 2003 NASCAR Craftsman Truck Series Rookie of the Year; 2007 NASCAR Busch Series Most Popular Driver; Named one of NASCAR's 75 Greatest Drivers (2023); NASCAR Hall of Fame (2025)

NASCAR Cup Series career
- 445 races run over 13 years
- 2016 position: 4th
- Best finish: 2nd (2008, 2011)
- First race: 2004 GFS Marketplace 400 (Michigan)
- Last race: 2016 Ford EcoBoost 400 (Homestead)
- First win: 2005 Golden Corral 500 (Atlanta)
- Last win: 2016 AAA Texas 500 (Texas)
Wins	Top tens	Poles
28	220	22

NASCAR O'Reilly Auto Parts Series career
- 245 races run over 10 years
- 2012 position: 105th
- Best finish: 1st (2007)
- First race: 2002 Charter Pipeline 250 (Gateway)
- Last race: 2012 Zippo 200 (Watkins Glen)
- First win: 2005 Aaron's 312 (Atlanta)
- Last win: 2012 Zippo 200 (Watkins Glen)
Wins	Top tens	Poles
38	174	27

NASCAR FedEx Freight Truck Series career
- 60 races run over 5 years
- 2007 position: 64th
- Best finish: 4th (2004)
- First race: 2002 O'Reilly Auto Parts 200 (Memphis)
- Last race: 2007 San Bernardino County 200 (California)
- First win: 2003 Built Ford Tough 225 (Kentucky)
- Last win: 2004 O'Reilly 200 (Bristol)
Wins	Top tens	Poles
6	35	4

Signature
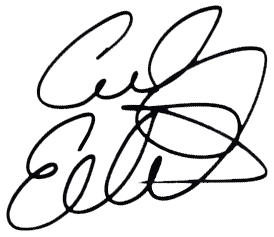
- Statistics up to date as of November 20, 2016.

Carl Michael Edwards Jr. (born August 15, 1979) is an American former professional stock car racing driver and a current analyst for NASCAR on Prime Video.

Edwards last competed in the NASCAR Sprint Cup Series, driving the No. 19 Toyota Camry for Joe Gibbs Racing. Prior to that, he drove the No. 99 Ford Fusion for Roush Fenway Racing from 2005–2014. He won the 2007 NASCAR Busch Series championship and nearly won the 2011 NASCAR Sprint Cup Series title, but lost by a tiebreaker to Tony Stewart. Edwards is known for doing a backflip off his car to celebrate his victories. In 2023, he was named one of NASCAR's 75 Greatest Drivers, and in 2025, he was inducted into the NASCAR Hall of Fame.

== Early life ==
Edwards was born on August 15, 1979, in Columbia, Missouri. He graduated from Rock Bridge High School in 1997. Edwards initially did not plan to attend college, but he received some state assistance and decided to attend the University of Missouri in his hometown of Columbia. After three semesters studying engineering, Edwards decided that university attendance was not working as he pursued his career goals in racing. Prior to becoming a full-time driver, Edwards was working as a substitute teacher while pursuing his racing career.

== Racing career ==
=== NASCAR ===
Edwards' big break came in 2002, when he competed in seven NASCAR Craftsman Truck Series events for MB Motorsports. His best finish in the seven races was eighth at Kansas Speedway. He also ran one Busch Series race for Bost Motorsports, finishing 38th at Gateway International Raceway. However, it was enough to impress Jack Roush, and Edwards became a full-time Truck Series competitor for Roush Racing in 2003, driving the No. 99 Ford F-150, and won his first race at Kentucky Speedway. He won Rookie-of-the-Year honors in addition to three race wins, eventually finishing eighth in the points standings at the end of the season. In 2004, he notched three more race wins, including the season-opening Florida Dodge Dealers 250 at the Daytona International Speedway. At season's end, Edwards finished fourth in the points. In August 2004, he made his Nextel Cup Series debut, replacing Jeff Burton, who left the team, in the No. 99 Ford Taurus for Roush Racing, at the Michigan International Speedway. He finished tenth. He drove the No. 99 Ford for the remainder of the 2004 Nextel Cup. He also once again ran one Busch Series race; this time for Robby Benton's RAB Racing team at Bristol Motor Speedway.

==== 2005: First full season ====
In 2005, Edwards signed on and became a full-time driver in both the Nextel Cup and Busch Series, although he had already run races in each in prior seasons. Shortly into the season, on March 19, 2005, Edwards made history in the process of winning. First, Edwards won the Aaron's 312 at the Atlanta Motor Speedway in Hampton, Georgia, recording his first Busch Series win. The next day, he beat Jimmie Johnson by two hundredths of a second to win the Golden Corral 500 at the same track for his first Nextel Cup Series win. Until this took place, no driver had ever won both the Busch and Nextel Cup Series races in the same weekend at Atlanta, although the feat had been pulled off numerous times before at other tracks by other drivers. Also, Edwards became the first driver in NASCAR history to pick up his first career Busch and Nextel Cup Series wins in the same weekend and became the eleventh driver in NASCAR history to win races in all three of the organization's major racing series.

On June 12, 2005, Edwards picked up his second Nextel Cup win by taking the checkered flag at the Pocono 500 at the Pocono Raceway in Long Pond, Pennsylvania. The weekend was somewhat bittersweet for Edwards, as the Busch Series race at the Nashville Superspeedway in Lebanon, Tennessee had been rained out the night before, and rescheduled for the same day. Also, qualifying for that race had been rained out, and in NASCAR, when qualifying is rained out, the starting grid is set by owner points. Because of this, Edwards convinced car owner Jack Roush to let Hank Parker Jr. drive the car. Hank ended up driving the car to a 20th-place finish. Since Edwards did not start the race he was not awarded any points, and as such lost a 74-point lead in Busch Series points and dropped to fourth in the standings; Edwards never recovered from the missed race and finished the season third in points, well behind series champion Martin Truex Jr. Edwards got his third win of 2005 on October 30 in the Bass Pro Shops MBNA 500 at Atlanta Motor Speedway, sweeping both of the Nextel Cup races at Atlanta for the 2005 season.

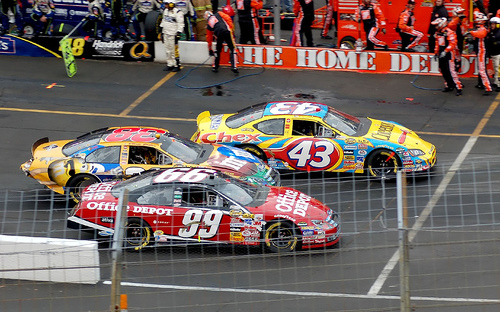
Edwards racing Elliott Sadler and Bobby Labonte on pit road

Edwards got his fourth win at Texas and became the tenth different driver to win at that track and the fifth to win there for Roush Racing. By finishing the remainder of the 2004 season in the No. 99 car, he was not eligible to compete for the Cup Series Rookie of the Year, but did win the 2005 Busch Series Rookie of the Year; he finished third in the Cup standings (with teammate Greg Biffle actually winning the tiebreaker for second by virtue of his series-best six wins).

==== 2006: Missing the Chase and winless season ====
In 2006, Edwards and Roush struggled to keep up with the competition. Edwards did not win a race in 2006, but did manage to score twenty top-tens. His best finishes came at Michigan, Loudon, and Dover in the fall, where he finished second. At the Chevy Rock and Roll 400 in Richmond, he missed the chase by getting wrecked and finished 35th three laps down.

==== 2007: Return to the Chase ====
On May 18, 2007, Edwards won the pole for the 2007 Nextel Open, and while he led almost the entire forty-lap race, he faded to third in the last few laps, just missing the feature event. On June 17, 2007, Carl Edwards broke his 52-race winless streak in the Nextel Cup by winning the Citizens Bank 400. Shortly thereafter, on July 23, he dislocated his thumb in an eleven-car pileup at a late model race at Nebraska Raceway Park (formerly I-80 Speedway) near Lincoln, Nebraska. Edwards won his second race of the 2007 season, and sixth career Cup race, at the Sharpie 500 at Bristol Motor Speedway on August 25. During the post-race interview on Victory Lane, Edwards commented on the race, saying, "This is the biggest win of my career". At the conclusion of the first 26 races, the 2007 "regular season", Edwards ranked sixth in overall standings, with 3372 points, 477 points behind overall points leader Jeff Gordon. Edwards entered the 2007 Chase for the Nextel Cup in fourth place, with 5020 points, based on his two wins in the 2007 season, clinching a spot in the Chase after his win at the Sharpie 500 at Bristol. Edwards struggled through the Chase despite winning at Dover during the Chase. The Hendrick duo of Jimmie Johnson and Jeff Gordon dominated the Chase for the Championship, winning six of the ten races and finishing No. 1 and No. 2 in the final 2007 standings. Edwards finished ninth in the final 2007 standings.

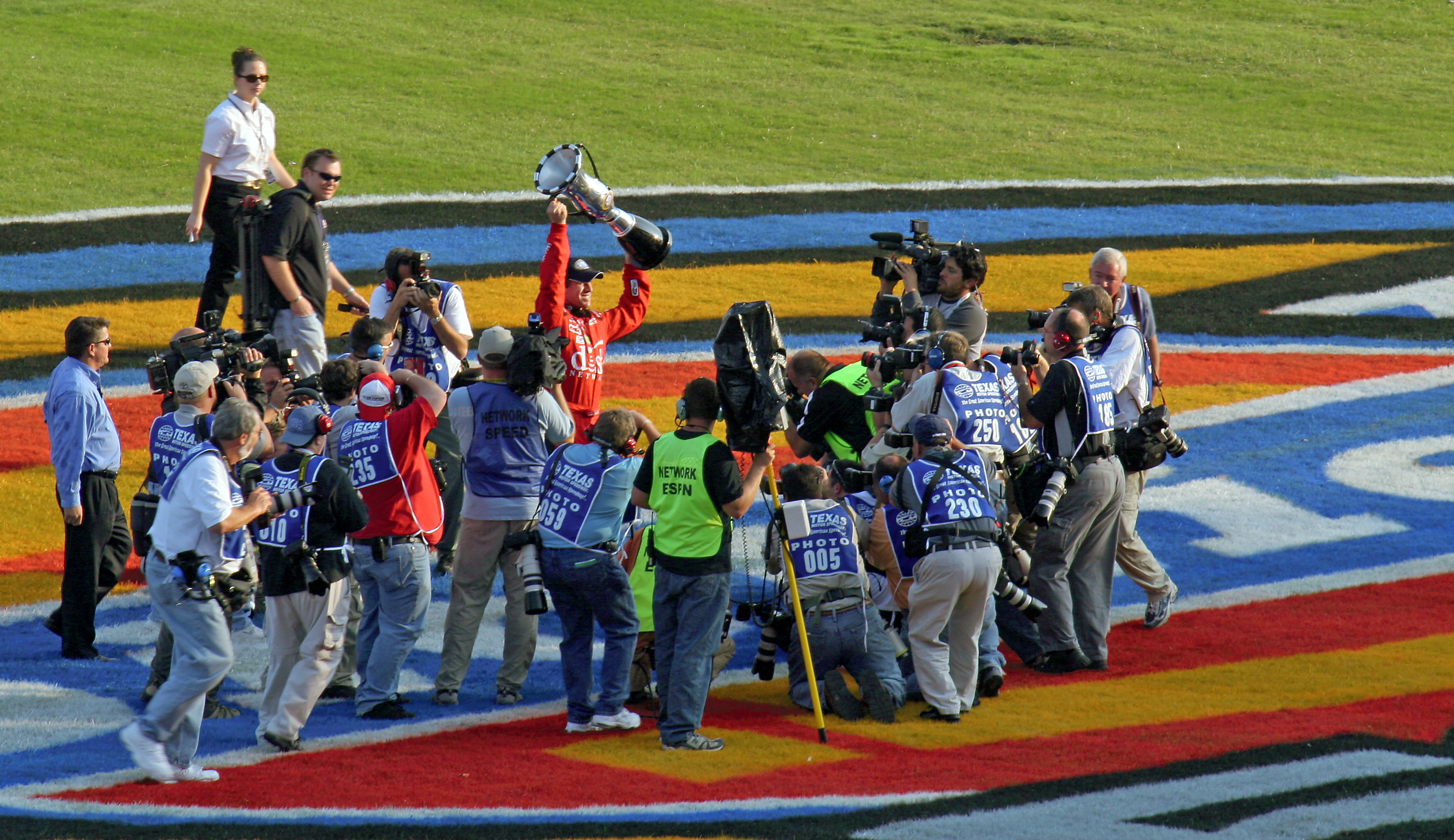
Edwards celebrating after clinching the 2007 Busch Series Championship after the fall Texas race

On November 3, 2007, Edwards clinched his first NASCAR Busch Series Championship by finishing eleventh at the O'Reilly Challenge. This came despite struggling in the second half of the Busch Series season. Edwards became the nineteenth different Busch Series Champion in the 26 years of the modern-era series. Edwards would end up becoming the final Busch Series Champion as Nationwide would take over sponsoring duties of the second-tier series in 2008.

==== 2008: First championship runner-up ====
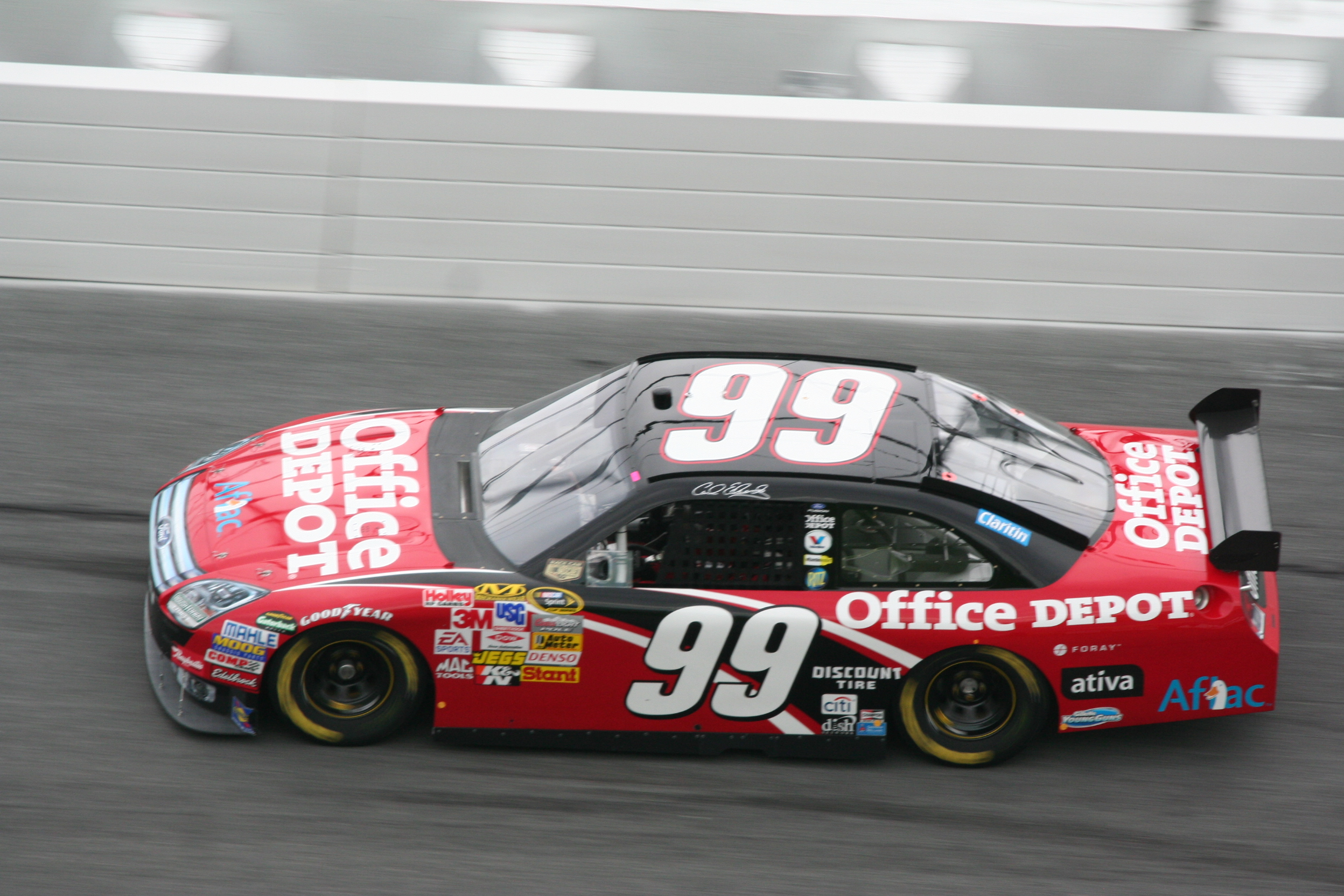
2008 NASCAR Cup Series car

The 2008 season was Edwards' strongest year, finishing second to Jimmie Johnson in the NASCAR Sprint Cup Series. Edwards won the 2008 Auto Club 500, his first Sprint Cup win of the year. The following week, Edwards won the UAW-Dodge 400 at Las Vegas Motor Speedway, his first back-to-back victories since 2005 when he won in Atlanta and Texas. These victories put Edwards at the top of the point standings for the first time in his career.

Following the Las Vegas win, on March 5, 2008, NASCAR penalized Edwards, owner Jack Roush, and crew chief Bob Osborne for violations found in post-race inspection. The No. 99 car driven by Edwards was found to be in violation of sections 12-4-A, 12-4-Q, and 20–2.1J of the 2008 NASCAR rulebook, specifically, the cover was off the oil tank. The violations were found during post-race inspection at Las Vegas Motor Speedway on March 2. The following penalties were levied by NASCAR: Edwards was fined one hundred driver points and stripped of his ten bonus points for the Las Vegas win, which would be used to seed him in the Chase for the Championship (should he make the Chase). Roush was fined one hundred owner points, and Osborne was suspended for six races and fined $100,000. Edwards was leading the Kobalt Tools 500, looking for his third consecutive victory, but on lap 274 his car began to smoke and his crew diagnosed the problem as a broken transmission. Edwards went on to finish 42nd. On April 7, he won the Samsung 500 at Texas Motor Speedway for his third win of the season.

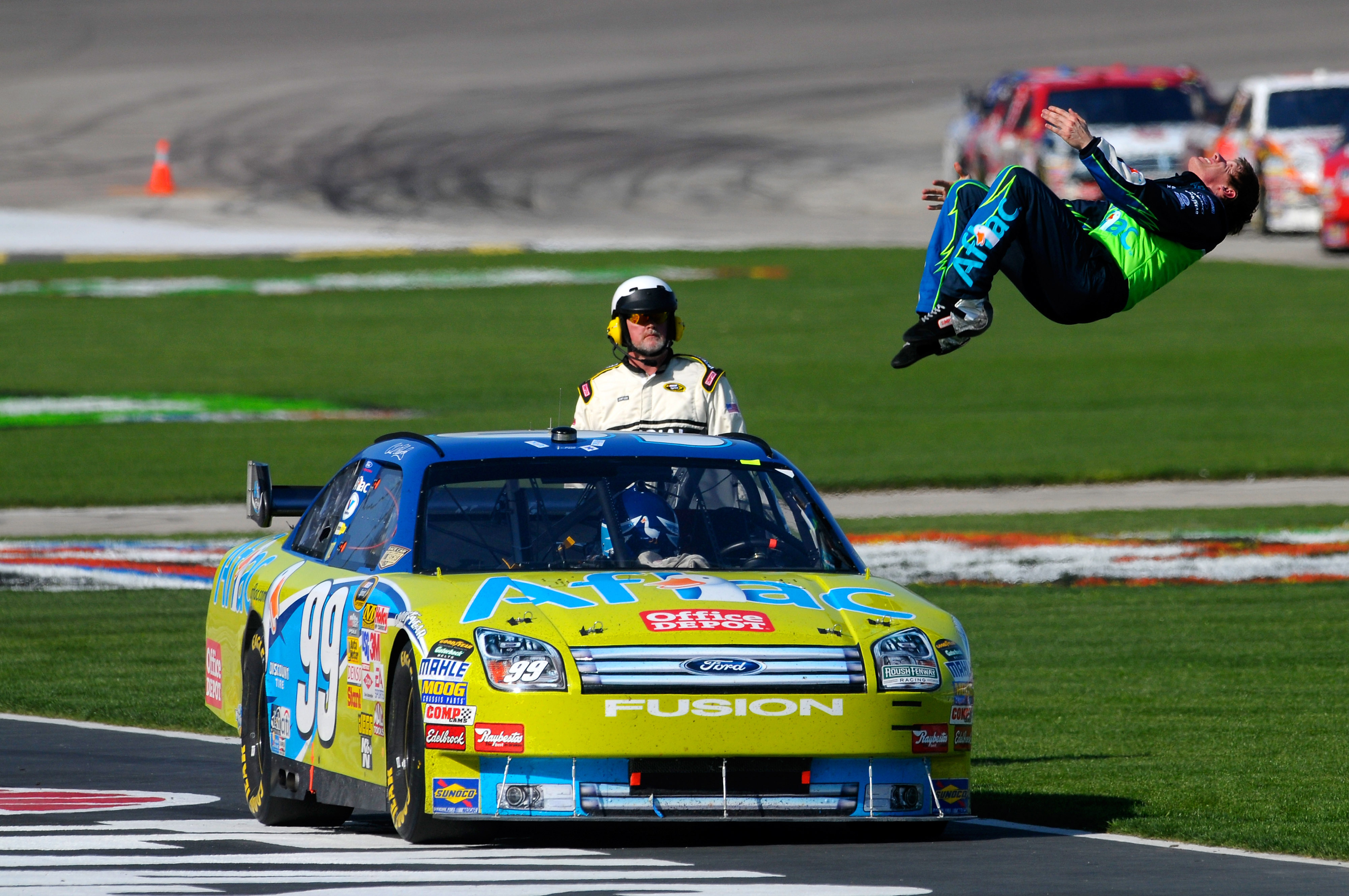
Edwards does his signature backflip after winning at Texas Motor Speedway in 2008.

On May 2, Edwards announced that he had signed a multi-year contract to remain with Roush Fenway Racing. On August 3, Edwards got his fourth NASCAR Sprint Cup victory of the season, surviving a rain delay and fuel shortage to win at Pocono. On August 17, Edwards dominated the 3M Performance 400 at Michigan International Speedway, capturing his fifth win of the season and surpassing his career high season win total of four in 2005. On August 24, Edwards earned another victory by winning the Sharpie 500 at Bristol Motor Speedway. The win was his second consecutive and sixth of the season. He did a bump and run on Kyle Busch in the closing laps to take the win from the dominant driver of the night. Busch showed his displeasure with Edwards after the race by driving into the side of Edwards' car, after which Edwards retaliated by spinning Kyle out. On October 26, Edwards earned his seventh victory of the season with a win in the Pep Boys Auto 500 at Atlanta. On November 2, Edwards tied Kyle Busch for the series wins lead by winning his second Dickies 500 at Texas, his eighth win of the season. He reduced his deficit in points to 106 behind Jimmie Johnson. On November 9 at Phoenix, Edwards finished fourth behind race winner Johnson, who, by virtue of the win and the ten bonus points he earned for leading one lap and the most laps, took a 141-point lead over Edwards. Edwards won the season finale at Homestead to take over the series wins lead for the season, extending his career high win total to nine. However, he did not finish far enough ahead of Johnson to take the Sprint Cup championship, as Johnson finished fifteenth and led at least one lap to win the championship by 69 points over Edwards. However, if the Chase had not been implemented in 2008, Edwards would've won the Sprint Cup Series Championship over Johnson by sixteen points on a fuel strategy call by him and his crew chief Bob Osborne.

==== 2009: Second winless season ====
Heading into the 2009 NASCAR Sprint Cup Season, many media analysts expected Edwards to challenge Johnson for the championship.

In the No. 99 car, on the final lap of the 2009 Aaron's 499 at Talladega in April, Edwards survived one of the most violent crashes in NASCAR history. Heading into the tri-oval with the lead, Edwards turned down into Brad Keselowski's path. Keselowski touched, and Edwards spun backwards, then went airborne. He was propelled higher when he was hit by Ryan Newman, whose hood was destroyed, and flipped airborne into the catch fence. Eight fans were injured, including a woman with a broken jaw; she was airlifted to a nearby hospital. Fortunately, Edwards emerged from the car unharmed and sprinted on foot over the start-finish line to the cheers of the crowd and with Fox Commentator Mike Joy commenting "shades of Ricky Bobby." Although he did cross the finish line (on foot), he was still given a DNF. When Edwards was interviewed on Larry King Live, he responded, "I'm kind of a Will Ferrell fan. He did that at the end of Talladega Nights."

He had a far more successful Nationwide Series season than a Sprint Cup Series season, including a win at the NAPA 200 at Montreal. In the race, Edwards had a top-ten position until a final green-white-checker finish put him in third spot on the restart. Edwards passed Andrew Ranger for second and recovered from spinning his tires on the restart to catch up with dominant leader Marcos Ambrose. Edwards was unable to pass the Australian champion until the final turn of the final lap, when Ambrose jumped over the curb too high. Edwards passed him and won the race in a big shock to the racing world; a finish considered to be one of the greatest in the sport. Edwards was elated about getting his first road course win at one of the most famous tracks in the world; he has said that the Montreal race is his favorite winning performance, and that Ambrose had chatted with him that week and taught him about the track during meetings, which he credited for his success.

He experienced another winless season in 2009 as his best finish was second at Pocono Raceway. Although Kyle Busch won the Nationwide Series championship, Edwards finished second in the series and scored five wins, finishing 210 points behind the winner.

==== 2010 ====
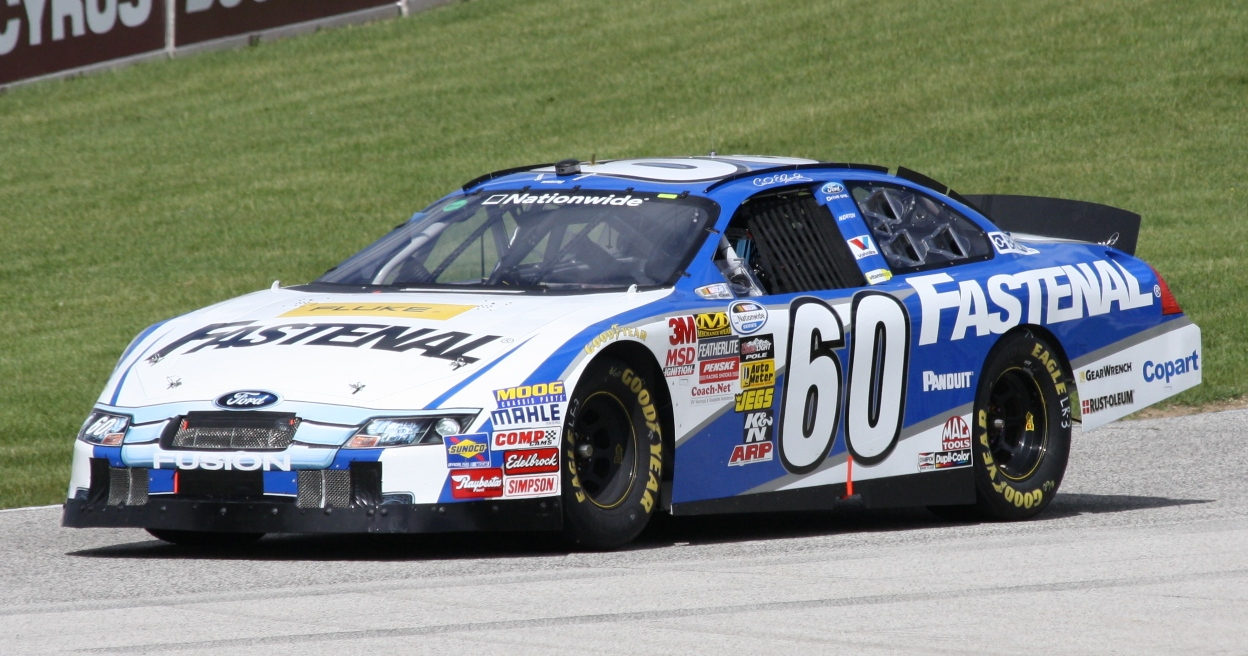
2010 Road America winning car

During a Cup Series race in Atlanta on lap 40, Edwards was tapped by Brad Keselowski, and it sent Edwards into Joey Logano, and both went up into the wall with damage. 283 laps later, with Edwards now 150 laps down on lap 323, Edwards got his retaliation against Keselowski. Edwards spun Keselowski in the tri-oval. Keselowski's car got airborne, flipped over, hit the wall on the roof, and came back on all fours, coming to a stop in turn 1. Fox commentators Mike Joy and Darrell Waltrip compared Keselowski's crash to the previous year's Aaron's 499 finish, where Keselowski wrecked Edwards in almost the same way. Edwards was parked for the rest of the race and was placed on a three-race probation. Edwards said in his interview that his retaliation didn't go as he had planned, that he never expected Keselowski's car to catch air like that, but was glad that Keselowski was okay.

Edwards won the first-ever Nationwide Series race at Road America in late June. He followed that up with a controversial win at the first Nationwide race of the season at Gateway, turning Brad Keselowski coming off the final turn to win the race. He won his third Nationwide race of the year at Texas Motor Speedway after dominating the race and a late race restart, where he was accused of jumping the start by Kyle Busch. He finished the season second in points for the third year in a row.

Edwards' season was a slow start in 2010. Going into Daytona in July, he was in danger of missing the Chase while barely running in the top twelve in points. The whole Roush Fenway team marks Chicagoland as the turning point for the organization, where Edwards finished second to David Reutimann. Edwards' performance increased from this point, with him winning the pole at Watkins Glen and Richmond, and leading laps at Atlanta and Richmond.

On November 12, 2010, Edwards broke the track record for the fastest qualifying lap at Phoenix International Raceway, scoring his sixth career pole. Carl went on to win the Kobalt Tools 500 on November 14, 2010, with his Aflac Ford Fusion and breaking a seventy-race winless streak going on from the 2008 Ford 400 at Homestead. The next weekend, Edwards qualified second at Homestead and went on to dominate and win the race, with season champion Jimmie Johnson finishing second. The late-season rally took Edwards to a fourth-place points finish.

==== 2011: Second championship runner-up ====
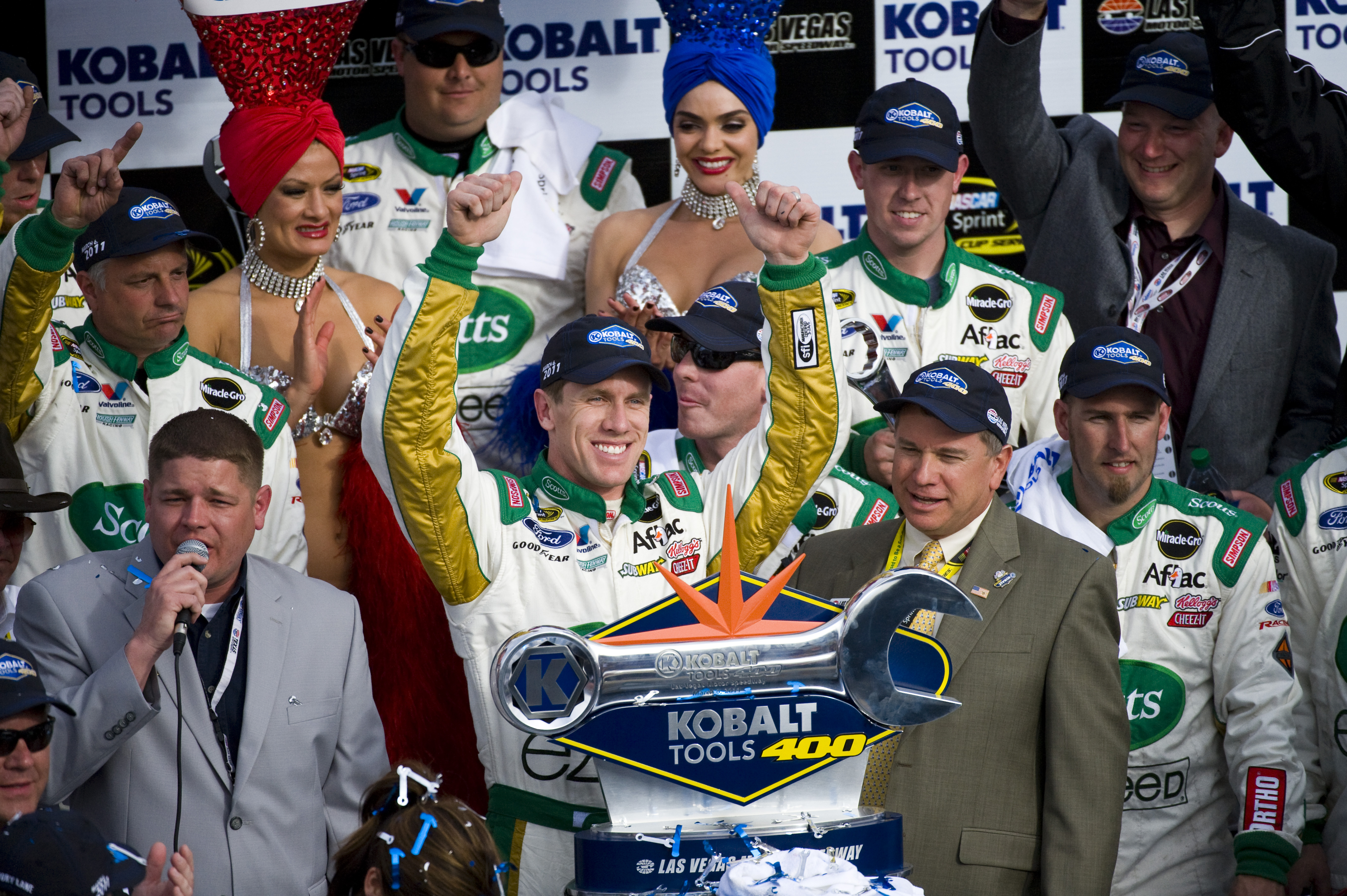
Edwards celebrating after winning the 2011 Kobalt Tools 400

On March 6, 2011, Edwards won the Kobalt Tools 400 at Las Vegas, his only points win of 2011. On May 21, 2011, he won the NASCAR Sprint All-Star Race. On August 4, 2011, Edwards re-signed with Roush Fenway Racing to continue driving his No. 99 Ford Fusion. The deal was reportedly worth over $40 million, with Ford talking Edwards into sticking with Roush Fenway Racing for the rest of his career. It was rumored for many months that Edwards was to move to Joe Gibbs Racing to take over the No. 20 Toyota Camry then driven by Joey Logano. Joe Gibbs was rumored to have offered Edwards an $8 million deal a year with a $10 million signing bonus.

For the rest of the season, Edwards raced with consistency and made the 2011 Chase field. After the Good Sam Club 500, he was in a tight points battle with Tony Stewart, but Stewart won the championship by holding off Edwards to win the 2011 Ford 400. They were tied in points, but Stewart won the tiebreaker, having five wins to Edwards' one. However, if the chase was not implemented in 2011, Carl Edwards would've ended up beating Jimmie Johnson and Kevin Harvick in the championship fight and would have locked up the championship a week early by finishing second at Phoenix. He would've been the first person to win the championship with only one win in the season since Matt Kenseth in 2003. In the Nationwide Series, Edwards contested the full season once again, but was unable to compete for the Drivers' Championship. Due to a scheduling conflict, he was forced to miss the Bucyrus 200 while the Cup Series raced at Infineon (aka Sonoma Raceway). Edwards won a career high eight races (including the May Dover race, which ended similarly to the previous year's Gateway race, only Edwards did not touch Logano like he thought he did) and gave Jack Roush the Nationwide Series Owners' Championship.

==== 2012: Third winless season ====
In January 2012, Edwards announced that he would not be competing in the Nationwide Series during the 2012 season, concentrating on his Sprint Cup championship effort.

At Texas, Edwards ran well until he made an unscheduled pit stop to check the lug on the car, sending him back to thirtieth, but was able to charge through over the course of 234 laps to finish eighth.

On August 11, 2012, Edwards entered and won his only race of the 2012 NASCAR Nationwide season at Watkins Glen. On September 8, 2012, during the race at the Federation Auto Parts 400, he finished seventeenth and missed the chase for the first time since the 2006 season.

==== 2013: Rebound season ====
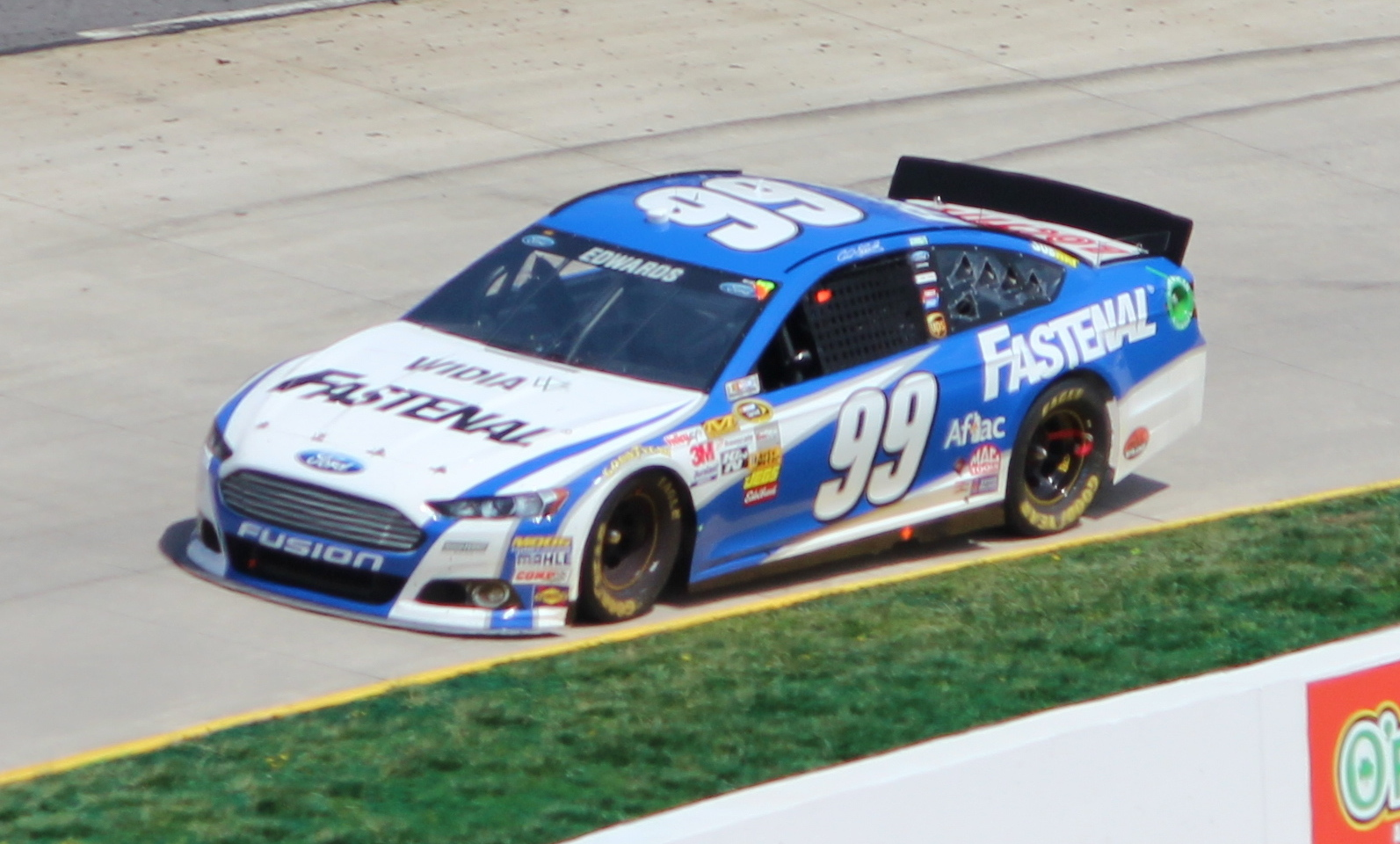
Edwards during the 2013 STP Gas Booster 500

In the 2013 Daytona 500, Edwards was caught in a crash in turn one after Trevor Bayne slid, and Edwards was sent into the wall. Edwards led the most laps the following week at Phoenix and prevailed late, the second time he broke a seventy-race winless streak at the short track.

On July 6, 2013, at the 2013 Coke Zero 400, Edwards had the potential to win until turn 2 on the last lap. He got pushed up the track by Marcos Ambrose and created a mini-pileup, putting Edwards at the end of the lead lap. The caution did not fly. The next week, he was eleventh most of the day and finished eighth at the 2013 Camping World RV Sales 301.

Edwards won his second race of the year at Richmond in September, assuming the lead on a cycle of pit stops and holding off Kurt Busch in the last laps, earning him an additional three points for Chase seeding. Edwards' win, however, caused controversy as it was discovered that Edwards jumped in front of the leader Paul Menard on a restart to take the lead for the final time; an action that NASCAR had given penalties for in the past. Following the controversy, NASCAR changed the rules to permit anybody to beat the leader to the start-finish line as long as they accelerate past the restart line first.

Though Edwards finished eleventh at Chicago and ninth at New Hampshire to start the Chase, his Chase chances were ended with a 35th-place finish at Dover, caused by an ill-handling car. He then had a fifth-place finish at Kansas, a tenth-place finish at Charlotte, a seventeenth-place finish at Talladega, and a twelfth-place finish at Martinsville. At Texas, Edwards started on the pole and battled Jimmie Johnson for the lead on several restarts, before his engine blew up and he finished 37th. At Phoenix, Edwards and Johnson nearly wrecked each other in turn 1 mid-race, but both cars continued on. Edwards ran out of gas with two laps left leading. Edwards finished 21st. He ended the season with a twelfth-place finish at Homestead and a thirteenth-place finish in the final points standings.

==== 2014: Final season at Roush ====
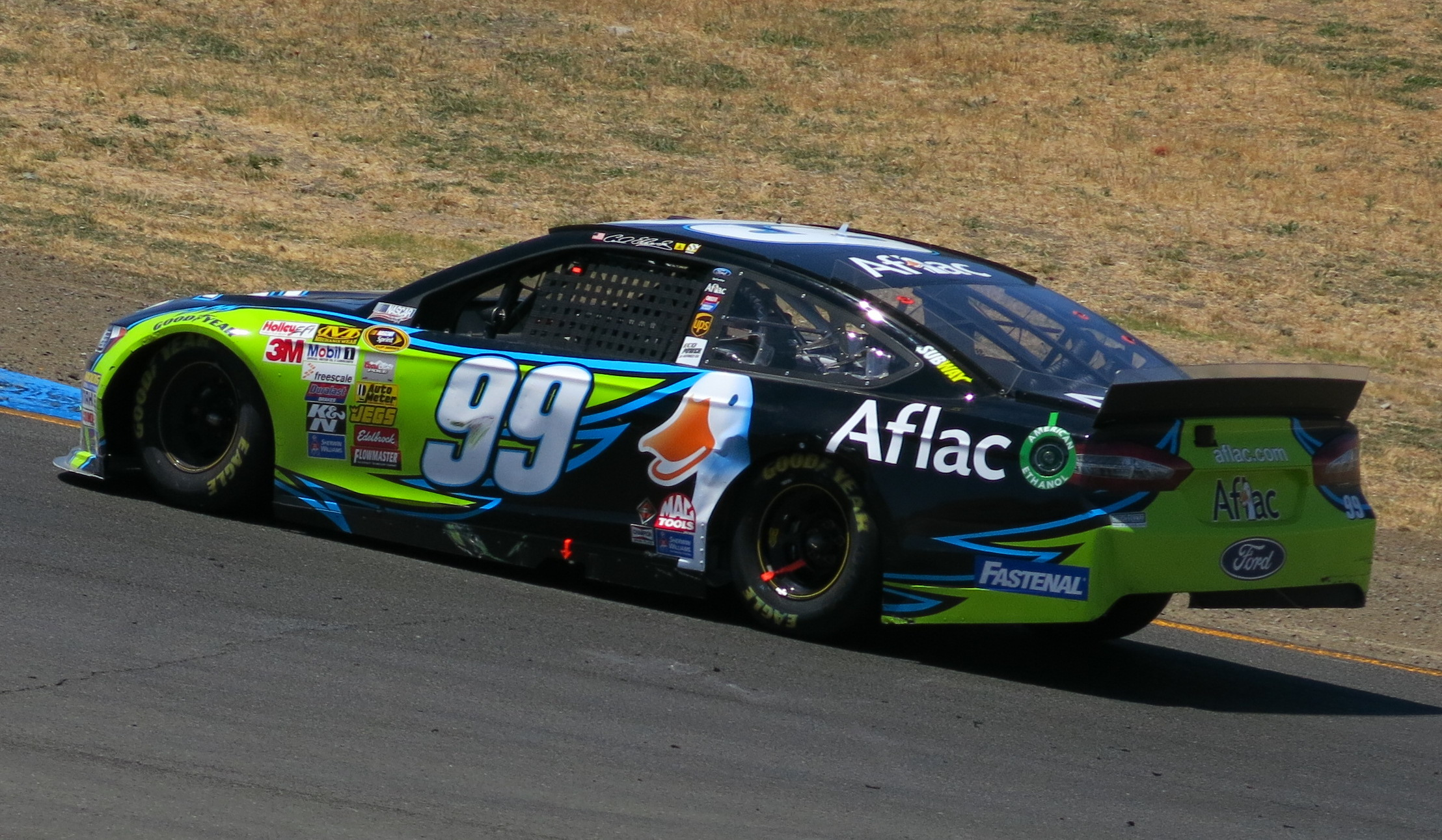
Edwards before winning the 2014 Toyota/Save Mart 350

At the 2014 Food City 500, Edwards won a rain-delayed race. He led the last 78 laps.

Weeks later, Edwards nearly won the All-Star Race for a second time after starting on pole. However, he was edged by Jamie McMurray for the win as McMurray passed him with eight laps to go to win the $1M purse. In a post-race interview, Edwards said, "I'm disappointed but Jamie did a good job on the restart. He cleared me and beat me fair and square. My hats off to him. I wish I won but I was just beaten."

In late May 2014, it was rumored that Edwards was leaving Roush's team for good. Edwards kept quiet for months over the rumors. During NASCAR RaceDay, Edwards stated he declined an offer from Richard Childress Racing, which made everybody speculate that Edwards already had plans for 2015. On June 19, 2014, Jayski's Silly Season Site stated he heard "that the deal between Edwards and Joe Gibbs Racing is done, no word when it will be announced." On July 27, 2014, RFR announced the 2015 lineup, with Edwards not listed.

On June 22, 2014, Edwards led the final nineteen laps of the 2014 Toyota/Save Mart 350 at Sonoma for his 23rd career NSCS win, his first road course win of his career, his second win of 2014, and his final win for Roush.

On the day of the 2014 Brickyard 400, Edwards admitted to the media that he was switching teams in 2015, effective immediately after 2014; but because a rule in his contract forbade him from mentioning his destination until September, he only mentioned the switch from Roush. According to Jack Roush, the parting was mutual and not because of any falling-out.

==== 2015: First season with Joe Gibbs and two crown jewel victories ====
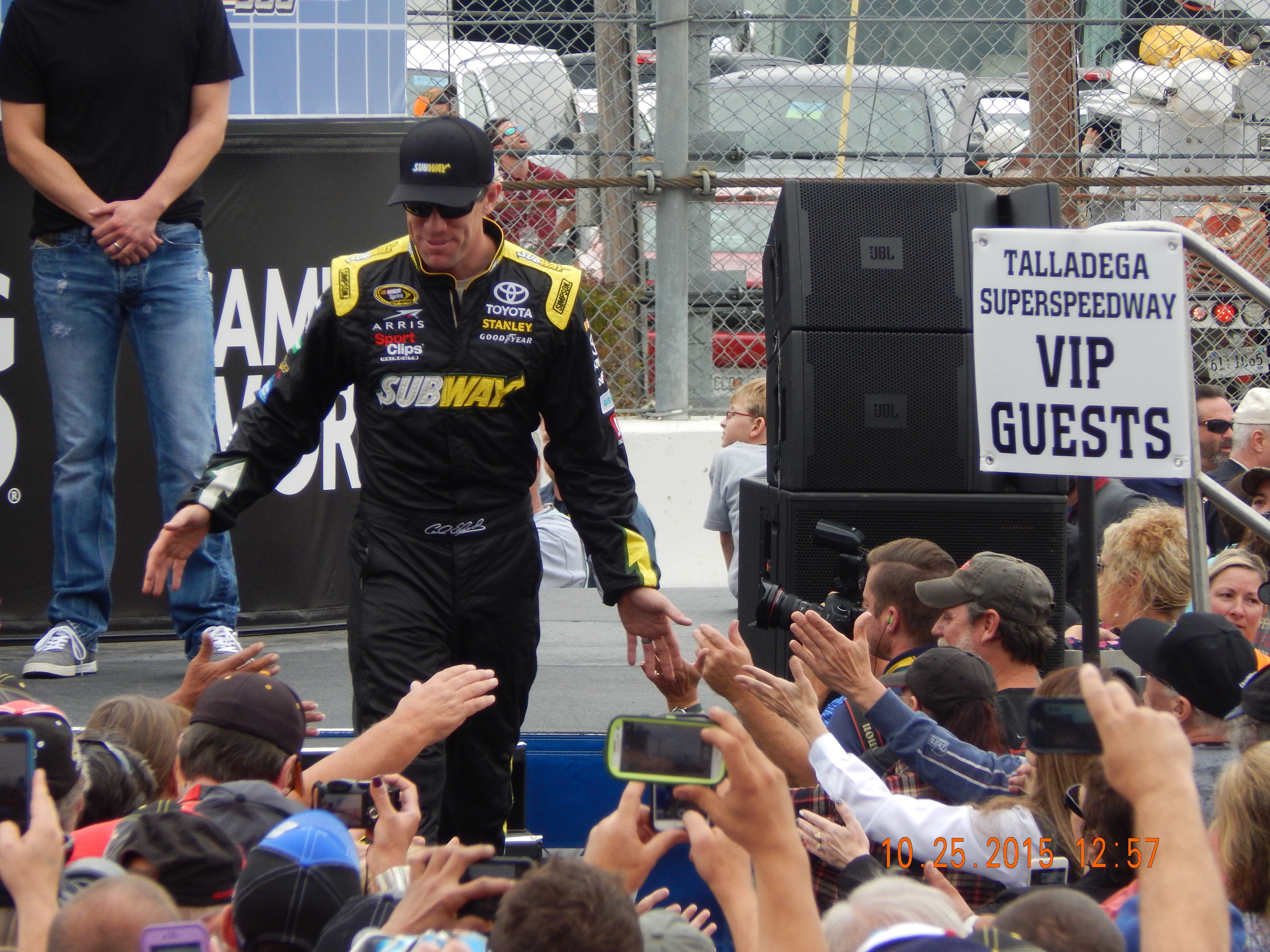
Edwards prior to the 2015 CampingWorld.com 500 at Talladega

Rumors arose of Edwards potentially joining Joe Gibbs Racing, which were confirmed on August 19, 2014, with Edwards signing a multi-year deal to drive the No. 19 Toyota for the team, a fourth entry for JGR.

Edwards began his season on a low note, wrecking at the end of the Daytona 500 and losing the draft late in the race in Atlanta. He rebounded at Las Vegas with a terrific run. While running close to the lead and leading a couple laps, Edwards tangled with Kasey Kahne with less than twenty laps to go. Edwards — while moving under Kahne — knocked Kahne into the SAFER barrier. In an apparent act of retaliation, Kahne forced Edwards out of the draft, wrecking Edwards and himself. Despite the payback, Edwards took responsibility for the collision, stating: "I was just racing as hard as I can. It's completely my fault, Kasey did a good job. I just got sucked up into him there off of turn 4 and tore up the right side a little bit and got loose into Turn 1 and that was it... that's definitely my fault. I feel bad for Kasey."

In the Coca-Cola 600 at Charlotte, Edwards took the lead early in the race, fell back, but managed to regain the lead close to the end, and held off former teammate Greg Biffle to win his 24th career win, snapping a 31-race winless streak. In July, he won the pole position for both the 5-hour Energy 301 at New Hampshire and the Brickyard 400 at Indianapolis. At Darlington, Edwards took his second win of the year after rallying back from being two laps down to the leaders.

In the Challenger Round of the Chase, Edwards started with a second-place finish at Chicagoland, coming back from a speeding penalty. At New Hampshire, he won the pole position, led nineteen laps, and finished fifth. At Dover, Edwards started third and finished fifteenth. He was eliminated in the Round of 8, but finished fifth in points.

==== 2016: Final season ====
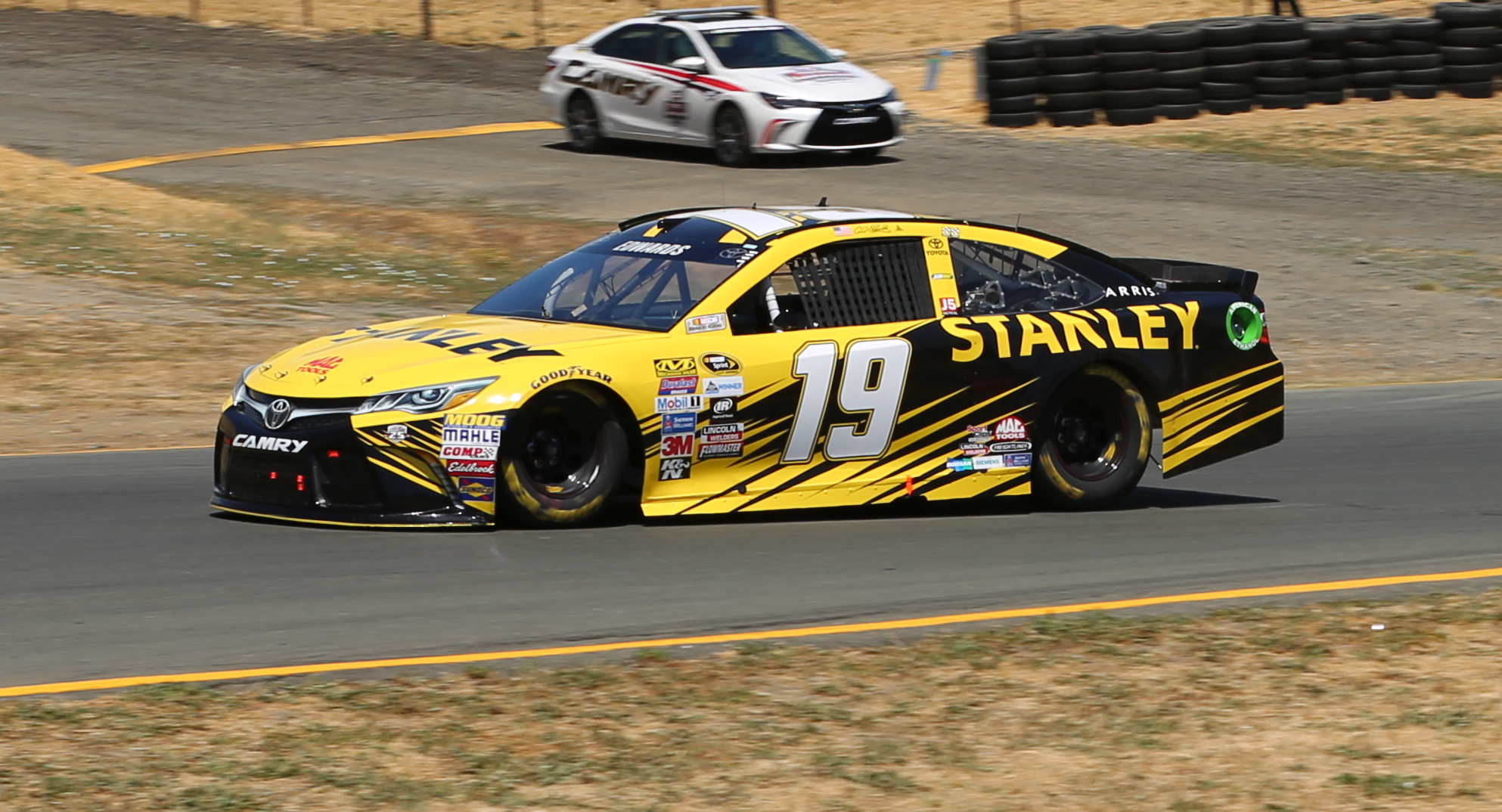
Edwards at Sonoma Raceway in 2016

Edwards parted ways with crew chief Darian Grubb after the 2015 season ended. Dave Rogers was tapped as his new crew chief. Edwards showed strength with his new crew chief, evident when he brought home several top tens. Edwards dominated the final laps of the 2016 Food City 500 to win the race after starting on pole. He also dominated nearly the whole race as he led 276 of 500 laps, holding off Dale Earnhardt Jr. and Kurt Busch on four restarts to win the race. On the final lap at Richmond, Edwards won the race after making a last-lap pass on teammate Kyle Busch, by moving him up the race track. He became the first driver to make a last-lap pass in Richmond Speedway's history. This elevated him from sixth in the standings to third. Edwards qualified for the playoffs and won a rain-shortened race at Texas to clinch a spot in the Championship 4 race at Homestead–Miami Speedway. Because the race was shortened by rain, Edwards did not do his signature backflip. In the final race at Homestead, he was hooked by championship rival Joey Logano on a restart with ten laps remaining, ending his hopes of winning a Cup Series championship. The championship was won by Jimmie Johnson for the seventh time in his career.

On January 9, 2017, FOX Sports reported Edwards planned to retire from NASCAR to pursue other opportunities; Daniel Suárez replaced him in the 2017 season. In his retirement press conference on January 11, 2017, Edwards said, "I don't have a life raft I'm jumping onto, I'm just jumping. And in a way, that makes it easier. This is a pure, simple, personal decision."

=== Other racing ===
On June 6, 2007, Edwards won the 2007 Nextel Prelude to the Dream at the Eldora Speedway. The Prelude is a dirt late model race organized in part by Tony Stewart, owner of Eldora, to benefit the Victory Junction Gang Camp and other worthy causes. Over twenty Nextel Cup drivers participated in the heat races and thirty-lap feature, along with other drivers from different forms of motorsports. Edwards started second in the feature and held off Kyle Busch and Jeff Gordon to win.

Edwards participated in the 2008 Race of Champions, partnered with Tanner Foust. While in the individual event, Edwards faced seven-time Formula One Champion Michael Schumacher and defeated him. In the next round, however, Edwards was defeated by eventual runner-up David Coulthard.

== In popular media ==
Edwards appeared on The Price Is Right, where he presented both showcases on the episode which aired on November 10, 2009. The Showcases were NASCAR-themed, with a trip to the Coca-Cola 600 and a Camping World trailer featured in one Showcase, while the other featured the debut of a new garage door prop for the "ultimate garage" Showcase that featured tools and a hybrid version of his Ford Fusion racer. Previously, Edwards had appeared in a small guest role during the fifth season of the hit Fox drama series 24.

He played in the annual Taco Bell All-Star Legends and Celebrity Softball Game in 2009 at Busch Stadium in St. Louis. During the game, he sported a Boston Red Sox cap because of the affiliation his race team Roush Fenway Racing has to the owners of the Boston Red Sox.

Edwards guest hosted on WWE Raw on February 8, 2010. Edwards also appeared a few weeks before the 2012 Daytona 500, saying to John Cena that he could wave the green flag for the start of the race; weather postponing the race to Monday kept Cena from doing so as he had to honor a WWE commitment in Portland.

In 2015, Edwards was a NASCAR on NBC guest analyst for the Xfinity Series race at Richmond. In 2016, Edwards was a Fox NASCAR guest analyst for the Xfinity Series race at Texas.

Edwards has a cameo appearance as a West Virginia state trooper in the 2017 film Logan Lucky. He also had a cameo appearance in Chicago Fire as a pizza delivery driver in the fourth season episode "2112". He made an appearance in the music videos for Justin Moore's 2011 song "Bait a Hook" and Sara Evans's 2013 track "Slow Me Down".

== Personal life ==
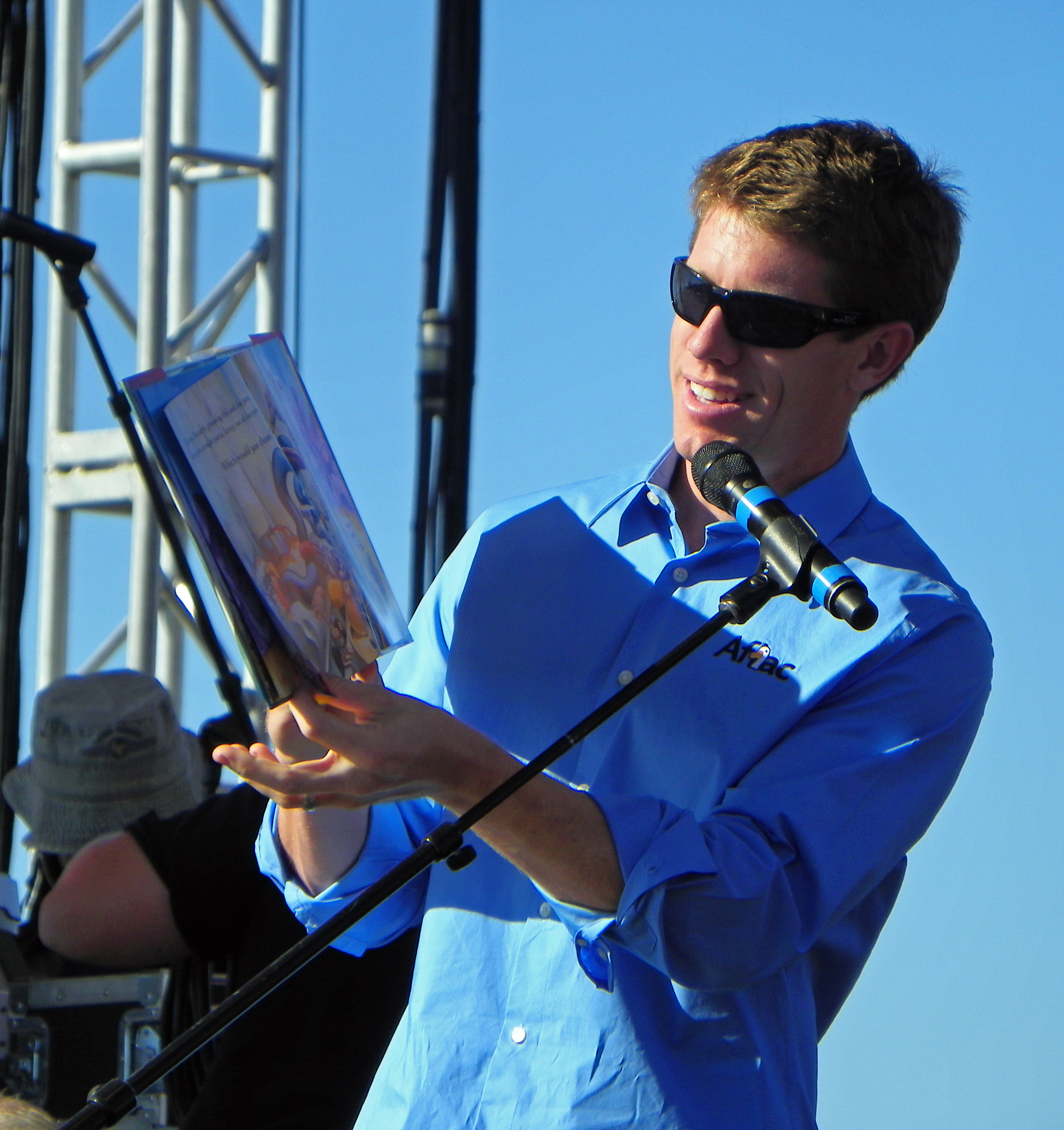
Edwards reading prior to the 2010 Pepsi Max 400

Edwards gave out business cards to other teams for his services before getting a ride with Roush Racing. Off the track, Edwards has been busy promoting his new record label, Back 40 Records, a company he started with a high school friend back in Columbia, Missouri. During the week of the 2006 Auto Club 500, Edwards participated in taping of the Fox television series 24, where he played Homeland Security Agent Jim Hill. Edwards was raised a Christian, but refused to talk about religion publicly and refused to answer religion-related questions when interviewed. In 2025, Edwards revealed in an interview on The Dale Jr. Download that he was "historically an atheist at best" but added, "I've come to realize at 45 years old that if I try to write down a list of all the things God didn't give me and that I did myself, there is just an empty sheet of paper in front of me."

He was rumored to be considering a run for the U.S. Senate seat in Missouri as a Republican against Claire McCaskill in 2018 but decided not to run. Josh Hawley defeated McCaskill in that Senate race. He was also reportedly floated as a potential nominee for the open Missouri U.S. Senate seat in 2022.

=== Family ===
Edwards dated Olympic gold medalist swimmer Amanda Beard in 2005 and 2006. Edwards married sports medicine doctor Katherine Downey on January 3, 2009.

He is a first cousin once removed to fellow driver Ken Schrader, who told Edwards early in his racing career to get dirt track experience before going to Cup; he would later take the advice. In light of this relationship, Edwards is often referred to as "Cousin Carl." During a visit to the USS Constitution Museum in 2016, Edwards revealed that his great-great-great-grandfather is Rutherford B. Hayes, the 19th President of the United States.

His daughter Anne was born on February 24, 2010, followed by son Michael on May 4, 2011. In 2026, Michael became a development driver for Toyota Gazoo Racing and competed in the Toyota GR Cup.

=== Athleticism ===
Edwards is popular among fans for celebrating his wins by doing a backflip off his car (or truck), a style of celebration he took from sprint car driver Tyler Walker. Seizing on the popularity of Edwards's trademark celebrations, Ford ran several "Overactive Adrenaline Disorder" commercials in 2006 featuring a "young Carl" performing backflips in his baby crib, off a couch, and off a doctor's exam table. Edwards also appeared in a This is SportsCenter commercial when he tried to excite anchor Neil Everett following a bad show. He has appeared in Aflac Commercials with the Aflac duck when Edwards was sponsored by Aflac, from 2009 to 2011.

He is also dedicated to fitness by biking and long-distance running off the track, but also his sponsors, which include Subway and Vitamin Water. He also appeared on "Eat Smart, Move More" Campaign ads in 2007.

== Motorsports career results ==
=== NASCAR ===
(key) (Bold – Pole position awarded by qualifying time. Italics – Pole position earned by points standings or practice time. * – Most laps led.)

==== Sprint Cup Series ====
NASCAR Sprint Cup Series results
Year	Team	No.	Make	1	2	3	4	5	6	7	8	9	10	11	12	13	14	15	16	17	18	19	20	21	22	23	24	25	26	27	28	29	30	31	32	33	34	35	36	NSCC	Pts	Ref
2004	Roush Racing	99	Ford	DAY	CAR	LVS	ATL	DAR	BRI	TEX	MAR	TAL	CAL	RCH	CLT	DOV	POC	MCH	SON	DAY	CHI	NHA	POC	IND	GLN	MCH; 10	BRI; 33	CAL; 6	RCH; 6	NHA; 20	DOV; 18	TAL; 42	KAN; 22	CLT; QL^{†}	MAR; 24	ATL; 3	PHO; 37	DAR; 7	HOM; 14	37th	1424	
2005	Roush Racing	99	Ford	DAY; 12	CAL; 5	LVS; 14	ATL; 1	BRI; 26	MAR; 38	TEX; 19	PHO; 7	TAL; 32	DAR; 9	RCH; 21	CLT; 3	DOV; 16	POC; 1	MCH; 5	SON; 38	DAY; 33	CHI; 39	NHA; 12	POC; 4	IND; 12	GLN; 19	MCH; 4	BRI; 24	**CAL**; 4	RCH; 21	NHA; 19	DOV; 9	TAL; 5	KAN; 3	CLT; 10	MAR; 26	ATL; 1*	TEX; 1	PHO; 6	**HOM**; 4*	3rd	6498	
2006	Roush Racing	99	Ford	DAY; 43	CAL; 3	LVS; 26	ATL; 40	BRI; 4	MAR; 16	TEX; 36	PHO; 4	TAL; 8	RCH; 7	DAR; 39	CLT; 3	DOV; 15	POC; 25	MCH; 2	SON; 6	DAY; 39	CHI; 20	NHA; 2	POC; 39	IND; 9	GLN; 5	MCH; 22	BRI; 7	CAL; 4	RCH; 35	NHA; 18	DOV; 2	KAN; 6	TAL; 9	CLT; 8	MAR; 12	ATL; 7	TEX; 15	PHO; 5	HOM; 8	12th	4428	
2007	Roush Fenway Racing	99	Ford	DAY; 23	CAL; 29	LVS; 6	ATL; 7	BRI; 12	MAR; 17	TEX; 12	PHO; 11	TAL; 42	RCH; 12	DAR; 5	CLT; 15	DOV; 3	POC; 14	MCH; 1*	SON; 18	NHA; 13	DAY; 4	CHI; 3	IND; 18	POC; 21	GLN; 8	MCH; 7	BRI; 1	CAL; 2	RCH; 42	NHA; 12	DOV; 1	KAN; 37	TAL; 14	CLT; 5	MAR; 11	ATL; 2	TEX; 26	**PHO**; 42	HOM; 5	9th	6222	
2008	Roush Fenway Racing	99	Ford	DAY; 19	CAL; 1	LVS; 1*	ATL; 42	BRI; 16	MAR; 9	TEX; 1*	PHO; 4	TAL; 40	RCH; 7	DAR; 2	CLT; 9	DOV; 2	POC; 9	MCH; 7	SON; 9	NHA; 17	DAY; 2	CHI; 32	IND; 2	POC; 1	GLN; 9	MCH; 1*	**BRI**; 1	CAL; 6	RCH; 13	NHA; 3	DOV; 3	KAN; 2	TAL; 29	CLT; 33	MAR; 3	ATL; 1	TEX; 1*	PHO; 4	HOM; 1*	2nd	6615	
2009	Roush Fenway Racing	99	Ford	DAY; 18	CAL; 7	LVS; 17	ATL; 3	BRI; 15	MAR; 26	TEX; 10	PHO; 10	TAL; 24	RCH; 26	DAR; 32	CLT; 4	DOV; 7	POC; 2*	MCH; 4	SON; 13	NHA; 19	DAY; 4	CHI; 14	IND; 15	POC; 18	GLN; 3	MCH; 4	BRI; 16	ATL; 37	RCH; 15	NHA; 17	DOV; 11	KAN; 10	CAL; 6	CLT; 39	MAR; 20	TAL; 14	TEX; 39	PHO; 16	HOM; 7	11th	6118	
2010	Roush Fenway Racing	99	Ford	DAY; 9	CAL; 13	LVS; 12	ATL; 39	BRI; 6	MAR; 8	PHO; 7	TEX; 33	TAL; 11	RCH; 5	DAR; 15	DOV; 8	CLT; 16	POC; 12	MCH; 12	SON; 29	NHA; 25	DAY; 6	CHI; 2	IND; 7	POC; 3	**GLN**; 5	MCH; 3	BRI; 12	ATL; 2	**RCH**; 10	NHA; 11	DOV; 5	KAN; 5	CAL; 6	CLT; 34	MAR; 12	TAL; 17	TEX; 19	**PHO**; 1	HOM; 1*	4th	6393	
2011	Roush Fenway Racing	99	Ford	DAY; 2	**PHO**; 28	LVS; 1	**BRI**; 2	CAL; 6	MAR; 18	TEX; 3	TAL; 6	RCH; 5	DAR; 2	DOV; 7	CLT; 16	KAN; 5	POC; 37	MCH; 5	SON; 3	DAY; 37	KEN; 5	NHA; 13	IND; 14	POC; 7	GLN; 12	MCH; 36	BRI; 9	ATL; 5	RCH; 2	CHI; 4	NHA; 8	DOV; 3	KAN; 5	CLT; 3	TAL; 11	**MAR**; 9	TEX; 2	PHO; 2	**HOM**; 2*	2nd^{a}	2403	
2012	Roush Fenway Racing	99	Ford	**DAY**; 8	PHO; 17	LVS; 5	BRI; 39	CAL; 5	MAR; 11	TEX; 8	KAN; 9	RCH; 10*	TAL; 31	DAR; 7	CLT; 9	DOV; 26	POC; 11	MCH; 11	SON; 21	KEN; 20	DAY; 6	NHA; 18	IND; 29	POC; 7	GLN; 14	MCH; 6	BRI; 22	ATL; 36	RCH; 17	CHI; 19	NHA; 19	DOV; 5	TAL; 36	CLT; 7	KAN; 14	MAR; 18	TEX; 16	PHO; 11	HOM; 12	15th	1030	
2013	Roush Fenway Racing	99	Ford	DAY; 33	PHO; 1*	LVS; 5	BRI; 18	CAL; 4	MAR; 15	TEX; 3	KAN; 17	RCH; 6	**TAL**; 3	DAR; 7	CLT; 11	DOV; 14	POC; 18	**MCH**; 8	SON; 3	KEN; 21	DAY; 29	NHA; 8	IND; 13	POC; 11	GLN; 4	MCH; 10	BRI; 39	ATL; 18	RCH; 1	CHI; 11	NHA; 9	DOV; 35	KAN; 5	CLT; 10	TAL; 17	MAR; 12	**TEX**; 37	PHO; 21	HOM; 12	13th	2282	
2014	Roush Fenway Racing	99	Ford	DAY; 17	PHO; 8	LVS; 5	BRI; 1	CAL; 10	MAR; 13	TEX; 14	DAR; 13	RCH; 9	TAL; 30	KAN; 6	CLT; 4	DOV; 14	POC; 41	MCH; 23	SON; 1	KEN; 17	DAY; 37	NHA; 13	IND; 15	POC; 29	GLN; 5	MCH; 23	BRI; 7	ATL; 5	RCH; 22	CHI; 20	NHA; 17	DOV; 11	KAN; 5	CLT; 8	TAL; 21	MAR; 20	TEX; 9	PHO; 15	HOM; 34	9th	2288	
2015	Joe Gibbs Racing	19	Toyota	DAY; 23	ATL; 12	LVS; 42	PHO; 13	CAL; 13	MAR; 17	TEX; 10	BRI; 24	RCH; 19	TAL; 32	KAN; 20	CLT; 1	DOV; 19	POC; 15	MCH; 12	SON; 40	DAY; 41	KEN; 4	**NHA**; 7	**IND**; 13	POC; 10	GLN; 8	MCH; 6	BRI; 7	DAR; 1	RCH; 11	CHI; 2	**NHA**; 5	DOV; 15	CLT; 6	KAN; 8	TAL; 5	MAR; 14	TEX; 5	PHO; 12	HOM; 11	5th	2368	
2016	Joe Gibbs Racing	19	Toyota	DAY; 5	ATL; 5	LVS; 18	PHO; 2	CAL; 7	MAR; 6	**TEX**; 7	**BRI**; 1*	RCH; 1*	TAL; 35	KAN; 11	DOV; 28	CLT; 18	POC; 8	MCH; 6	**SON**; 4	DAY; 25	KEN; 2	NHA; 20	IND; 35	POC; 8	**GLN**; 15	**BRI**; 6	MCH; 7	DAR; 19	RCH; 32	CHI; 15	**NHA**; 6	DOV; 14	CLT; 12	KAN; 2	TAL; 29	MAR; 36	TEX; 1	PHO; 19	HOM; 34	4th	5007	
^{†} – Qualified and relieved for Dave Blaney during the race

^{a} Edwards lost the title to Tony Stewart on a tiebreaker, after both tied on 2403 points. He won one race compared to Stewart's five.

===== Daytona 500 =====
Year	Team	Manufacturer	Start	Finish
2005	Roush Racing	Ford	27	12
2006	Roush Racing	Ford	5	43
2007	Roush Fenway Racing	Ford	14	23
2008	Roush Fenway Racing	Ford	11	19
2009	Roush Fenway Racing	Ford	16	18
2010	Roush Fenway Racing	Ford	27	9
2011	Roush Fenway Racing	Ford	22	2
2012	Roush Fenway Racing	Ford	**1**	8
2013	Roush Fenway Racing	Ford	36	33
2014	Roush Fenway Racing	Ford	30	17
2015	Joe Gibbs Racing	Toyota	6	23
2016	Joe Gibbs Racing	Toyota	10	5

==== Nationwide Series ====
NASCAR Nationwide Series results
Year	Team	No.	Make	1	2	3	4	5	6	7	8	9	10	11	12	13	14	15	16	17	18	19	20	21	22	23	24	25	26	27	28	29	30	31	32	33	34	35	NNSC	Pts	Ref
2002	Bost Motorsports	9	Chevy	DAY	CAR	LVS	DAR	BRI	TEX	NSH	TAL	CAL	RCH	NHA	NZH	CLT	DOV	NSH	KEN	MLW	DAY	CHI	GTW; 38	PPR	IRP	MCH	BRI	DAR	RCH	DOV	KAN	CLT	MEM	ATL	CAR	PHO	HOM		117th	49	
2004	RAB Racing	03	Ford	DAY	CAR	LVS	DAR	BRI	TEX	NSH	TAL	CAL	GTW	RCH	NZH	CLT	DOV	NSH	KEN	MLW	DAY	CHI	NHA	PPR	IRP	MCH	BRI; 19	CAL	RCH	DOV	KAN	CLT	MEM	ATL	PHO	DAR	HOM		116th	106	
2005	Roush Racing	60	Ford	DAY; 10	CAL; 6	MXC; 3	**LVS**; 7*	**ATL**; 1	NSH; 4	**BRI**; 7	TEX; 4	PHO; 8	TAL; 33	DAR; 11	RCH; 1	CLT; 35	**DOV**; 31	NSH	**KEN**; 1*	MLW; 14	DAY; 36	CHI; 4	NHA; 2	PPR; 34	GTW; 3	IRP; 20	GLN; 11	MCH; 3	BRI; 29	CAL; 1	RCH; 28	DOV; 9	KAN; 27	CLT; 4	MEM; 5	TEX; 3	**PHO**; 1*	HOM; 19	3rd	4601	
2006	Roush Racing	60	Ford	DAY; 39	**CAL**; 3	MXC; 8	LVS; 5	ATL; 24	BRI; 5	TEX; 43	NSH; 5	PHO; 3	TAL; 10	RCH; 6	DAR; 8	CLT; 1	DOV; 2*	NSH; 1*	KEN; 36	MLW; 21	DAY; 5	**CHI**; 2	NHA; 1	MAR; 6	GTW; 1	IRP; 10	GLN; 27	MCH; 23	BRI; 8	CAL; 12	RCH; 9	DOV; 26	KAN; 6	**CLT**; 27*	MEM; 3	TEX; 7	PHO; 5	HOM; 2	2nd	4824	
2007	Roush Fenway Racing	60	Ford	DAY; 3	CAL; 4	MXC; 4	LVS; 6	ATL; 4	BRI; 1*	NSH; 1*	TEX; 3	PHO; 5	TAL; 10	RCH; 13	DAR; 3	CLT; 17	DOV; 1*	NSH; 1	KEN; 33*	MLW; 8*	NHA; 2	DAY; 11	CHI; 20	GTW; 6	IRP; 4	CGV; 30	GLN; 32	MCH; 28	BRI; 11	CAL; 26	RCH; 2	DOV; 6	KAN; 38	CLT; 33	MEM; 25	TEX; 11	PHO; 7	HOM; 4	1st	4805	
2008	Roush Fenway Racing	60	Ford	DAY; 10	CAL; 5	LVS; 14	ATL; 4	BRI; 14	NSH; 3	TEX; 13	PHO; 2	MXC; 4	TAL; 31	RCH; 7*	**DAR**; 43	CLT; 13	**DOV**; 2	NSH; 13	KEN; 20	MLW; 1	NHA; 5	DAY; 11	CHI; 16	GTW; 1*	IRP; 11	CGV; 6	GLN; 25	**MCH**; 1*	BRI; 37	CAL; 2	RCH; 1	DOV; 5	KAN; 4	CLT; 5	MEM; 1*	**TEX**; 2	PHO; 1*	HOM; 1	2nd	5111	
2009	Roush Fenway Racing	60	Ford	DAY; 2	**CAL**; 4	LVS; 2	BRI; 2	TEX; 18	**NSH**; 5	**PHO**; 33	TAL; 13	RCH; 2	DAR; 3	**CLT**; 10	DOV; 5	NSH; 3	KEN; 20	MLW; 1	NHA; 6	DAY; 3	**CHI**; 6	GTW; 3	IRP; 1*	IOW; 4	GLN; 3	MCH; 40	BRI; 2	CGV; 1	ATL; 7	RCH; 1	DOV; 5	KAN; 7	CAL; 3	**CLT**; 5	MEM; 6	TEX; 9	PHO; 1*	**HOM**; 2	2nd	5472	
2010	Roush Fenway Racing	60	Ford	DAY; 2	CAL; 4	LVS; 3	BRI; 4	NSH; 6	**PHO**; 6	TEX; 30	TAL; 35	RCH; 5	DAR; 6	DOV; 11	**CLT**; 9	NSH; 2	KEN; 2	**ROA**; 1*	NHA; 3	DAY; 11	CHI; 6	GTW; 1	IRP; 2	IOW; 10	GLN; 33	MCH; 2	BRI; 5	CGV; 20*	ATL; 3	RCH; 10	DOV; 3	KAN; 14	CAL; 4	CLT; 13	GTW; 5	TEX; 1	PHO; 1*	HOM; 6	2nd	5194	
2011	Roush Fenway Racing	60	Ford	DAY; 29	PHO; 2	**LVS**; 6*	BRI; 7	**CAL**; 2	**TEX**; 1*	TAL; 17	NSH; 1*	**RCH**; 25	DAR; 20	**DOV**; 1*	IOW; 2	CLT; 2*	CHI; 2*	MCH; 1*	ROA	DAY; 14	KEN; 8	NHA; 34	NSH; 1*	IRP; 5	IOW; 2	GLN; 5	CGV; 7	BRI; 4	**ATL**; 1*	RCH; 2*	CHI; 2	DOV; 1*	**KAN**; 2	CLT; 1	TEX; 3*	PHO; 3	HOM; 3*		89th	0^{1}	
2012	Roush Fenway Racing	60	Ford	DAY	PHO	LVS	BRI	CAL	TEX	RCH	TAL	DAR	IOW	CLT	DOV	MCH	ROA	KEN	DAY	NHA	CHI	IND	IOW	GLN; 1	CGV	BRI	ATL	RCH	CHI	KEN	DOV	CLT	KAN	TEX	PHO	HOM			105th	0^{1}	

==== Craftsman Truck Series ====
NASCAR Craftsman Truck Series results
Year	Team	No.	Make	1	2	3	4	5	6	7	8	9	10	11	12	13	14	15	16	17	18	19	20	21	22	23	24	25	NCTC	Pts	Ref
2002	MB Motorsports	63	Ford	DAY	DAR	MAR	GTW	PPR	DOV	TEX	MEM; 23	MLW; 28	KAN; 8	KEN; 18	NHA	MCH	IRP; 19	NSH	RCH	TEX; 24	SBO	LVS; 36	CAL	PHO	HOM				33rd	676	
2003	Roush Racing	99	Ford	DAY; 24	DAR; 23	MMR; 15	MAR; 4	CLT; 12	DOV; 33	TEX; 2	MEM; 5	MLW; 15	KAN; 2	KEN; 1	GTW; 4	MCH; 5	IRP; 1*	NSH; 1*	BRI; 11	RCH; 25	NHA; 2	CAL; 7	LVS; 27	SBO; 7	TEX; 4	**MAR**; 2	PHO; 4	HOM; 27	8th	3416	
2004	Roush Racing	99	Ford	DAY; 1*	ATL; 7	MAR; 6	MFD; 17	CLT; 2*	**DOV**; 14	TEX; 6	MEM; 5	MLW; 23	KAN; 1	KEN; 33	GTW; 18	MCH; 6	IRP; 5	NSH; 20	BRI; 1	RCH; 5	NHA; 4	LVS; 33	CAL; 10	TEX; 9	MAR; 8	PHO; 10	**DAR**; 4	HOM; 12	4th	3493	
2006	Roush Racing	50	Ford	DAY	CAL	ATL	MAR	GTW	CLT	MFD	DOV; 2	TEX	MCH	MLW	KAN	KEN	MEM	IRP	NSH	BRI	NHA	LVS	TAL	MAR	ATL	TEX	PHO	HOM	63rd	170	
2007	Roush Fenway Racing	50	Ford	DAY; 24	**CAL**; 4	ATL	MAR	KAN	CLT	MFD	DOV	TEX	MCH	MLW	MEM	KEN	IRP	NSH	BRI	GTW	NHA	LVS	TAL	MAR	ATL	TEX	PHO	HOM	64th	251	

^{*} Season still in progress
^{1} Ineligible for series points

=== Rolex Sports Car Series ===
(key) (Races in bold indicate pole position, Results are overall/class)

Rolex Sports Car Series results
Year	Team	Make	Engine	Class	1	2	3	4	5	6	7	8	9	10	11	12	Points	Ref
2009	Doran Racing	Dallara	Ford	DP	DAY	VIR	NJ	LAG	WAT	MOH	DAY2	BAR	WAT2	CGV; 29/16	MIL	HOM	0	

Sporting positions
Preceded by Kevin Harvick	NASCAR Busch Series Champion; 2007	Succeeded by Clint Bowyer
Achievements
Preceded by Jimmie Johnson	Coca-Cola 600 Winner; 2015	Succeeded by Martin Truex Jr.
Preceded by Kevin Harvick	Bojangles' Southern 500 Winner; 2015	Succeeded by Martin Truex Jr.
Preceded by Kurt Busch	NASCAR Sprint All-Star Race Winner; 2011	Succeeded by Jimmie Johnson
Preceded by Tony Stewart	Prelude to the Dream Winner; 2007	Succeeded by Tony Stewart
Awards
Preceded by Kyle Busch	NASCAR Busch Series Rookie of the Year; 2005	Succeeded by Danny O'Quinn
Preceded by Brendan Gaughan	NASCAR Craftsman Truck Series Rookie of the Year; 2003	Succeeded by David Reutimann
Preceded by Kenny Wallace	NASCAR Busch Series Most Popular Driver; 2007	Succeeded by Brad Keselowski
