= No Fear Racing =

Former NASCAR team

- Owner(s): Frank Stoddard; Mark Simo
- Series: NASCAR Sprint Cup Series
- Race drivers: Boris Said, David Ragan
- Manufacturer: Ford
- Opened: 2006
- Closed: 2009

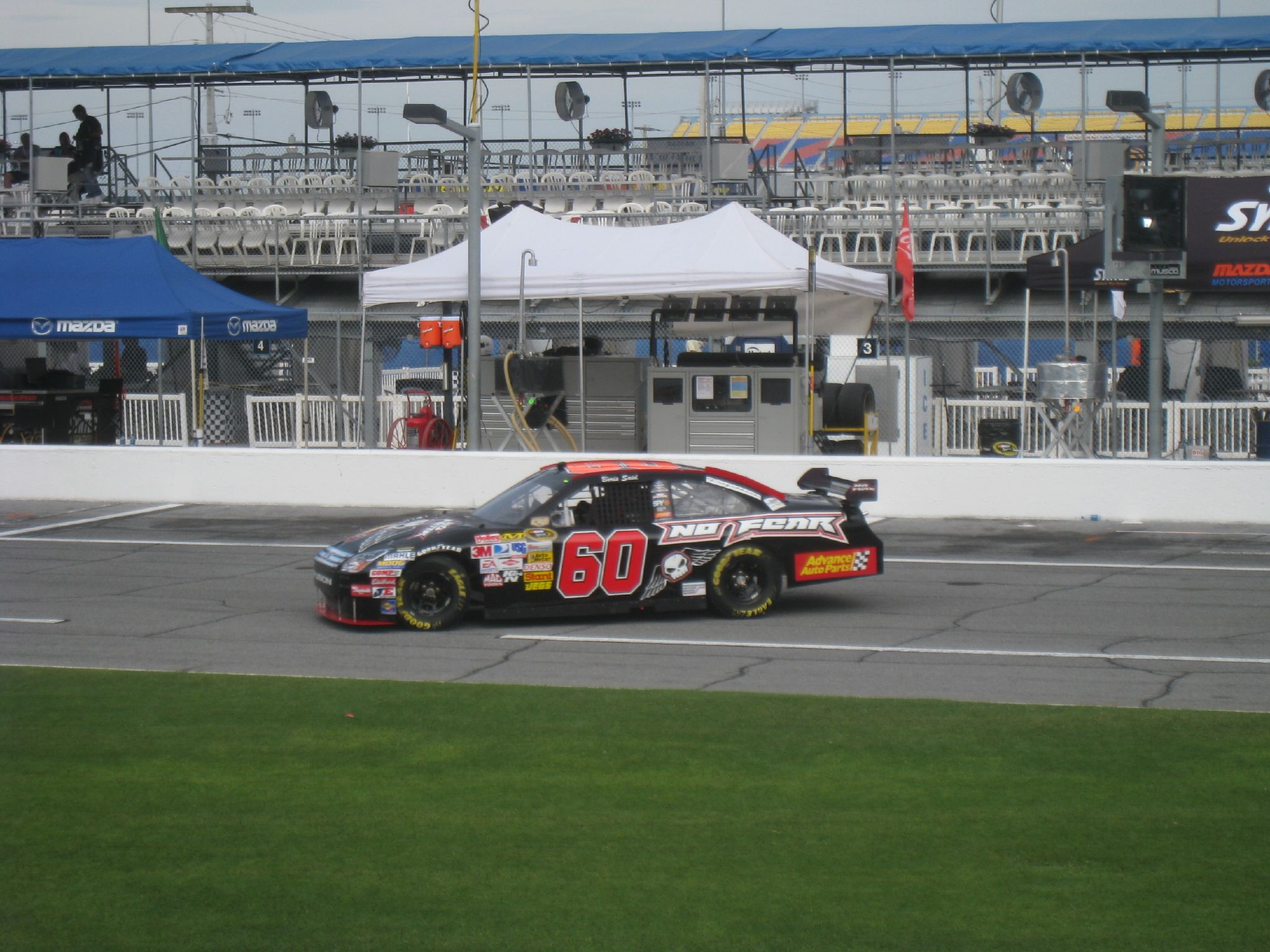
Boris Said 2008

No Fear Racing was a part-time NASCAR Sprint Cup Series team racing the No. 60 SoBe No Fear Energy Drink Ford Fusion driven by Boris Said. It was owned by Frank Stoddard and Mark Simo, owner of the No Fear brand. The team debuted at the 2006 Dodge/Save Mart 350 at Infineon Raceway. The next week, Said won the pole for the Pepsi 400 and finished fourth. Simo Racing's cars were prepared by Roush Fenway Racing.

Heading into the 2009 season, No Fear formed a partnership called Carter/Simo Racing with John Carter Racing to share owner points and resources during the season. The team would run Carter's No. 08 during the year and Terry Labonte would drive Toyotas for Carter while Boris Said would drive Fords for No Fear.

Prior to the 2011 season, Stoddard would purchase the remaining equipment to form FAS Lane Racing, after it had been used by Latitude 43 Motorsports in 2010 (where Stoddard had been crew chief).

== Car No. 60 results ==
NASCAR Nextel Cup Series results
Year	Driver	No.	Make	1	2	3	4	5	6	7	8	9	10	11	12	13	14	15	16	17	18	19	20	21	22	23	24	25	26	27	28	29	30	31	32	33	34	35	36	Owners	Pts
2006	Boris Said	60	Ford	DAY	CAL	LVS	ATL	BRI	MAR	TEX	PHO	TAL	RCH	DAR	CLT	DOV	POC	MCH	SON; 9	DAY; 4	CHI	NHA	POC	IND; 42	GLN; 31	MCH	BRI	CAL	RCH	NHA	DOV	KAN	TAL	CLT	MAR	ATL				52nd	380
2006	David Ragan	60	Ford																																		TEX; DNQ	PHO	HOM; DNQ	52nd	380
2007	Boris Said	60	Ford	DAY; 14	CAL	LVS	ATL	BRI	MAR	TEX	PHO	TAL; 27	RCH	DAR	CLT	DOV	POC	MCH	SON; 9	NHA	DAY; DNQ	CHI	IND	POC	GLN; DNQ	MCH	BRI	CAL	RCH	NHA	DOV	KAN	TAL; DNQ	CLT	MAR	ATL	TEX	PHO	HOM	50th	387
2008	Boris Said	60	Ford	DAY; DNQ	CAL; Wth	LVS	ATL	BRI	MAR	TEX	PHO	TAL	RCH	DAR	CLT	DOV	POC	MCH	SON; 41	NHA	DAY; 35	CHI	IND	POC	GLN; DNQ	MCH	BRI	CAL	RCH	NHA	DOV	KAN	TAL	CLT	MAR	ATL	TEX	PHO	HOM	51st	153
