= Boris Said =

American racing driver (born 1962)

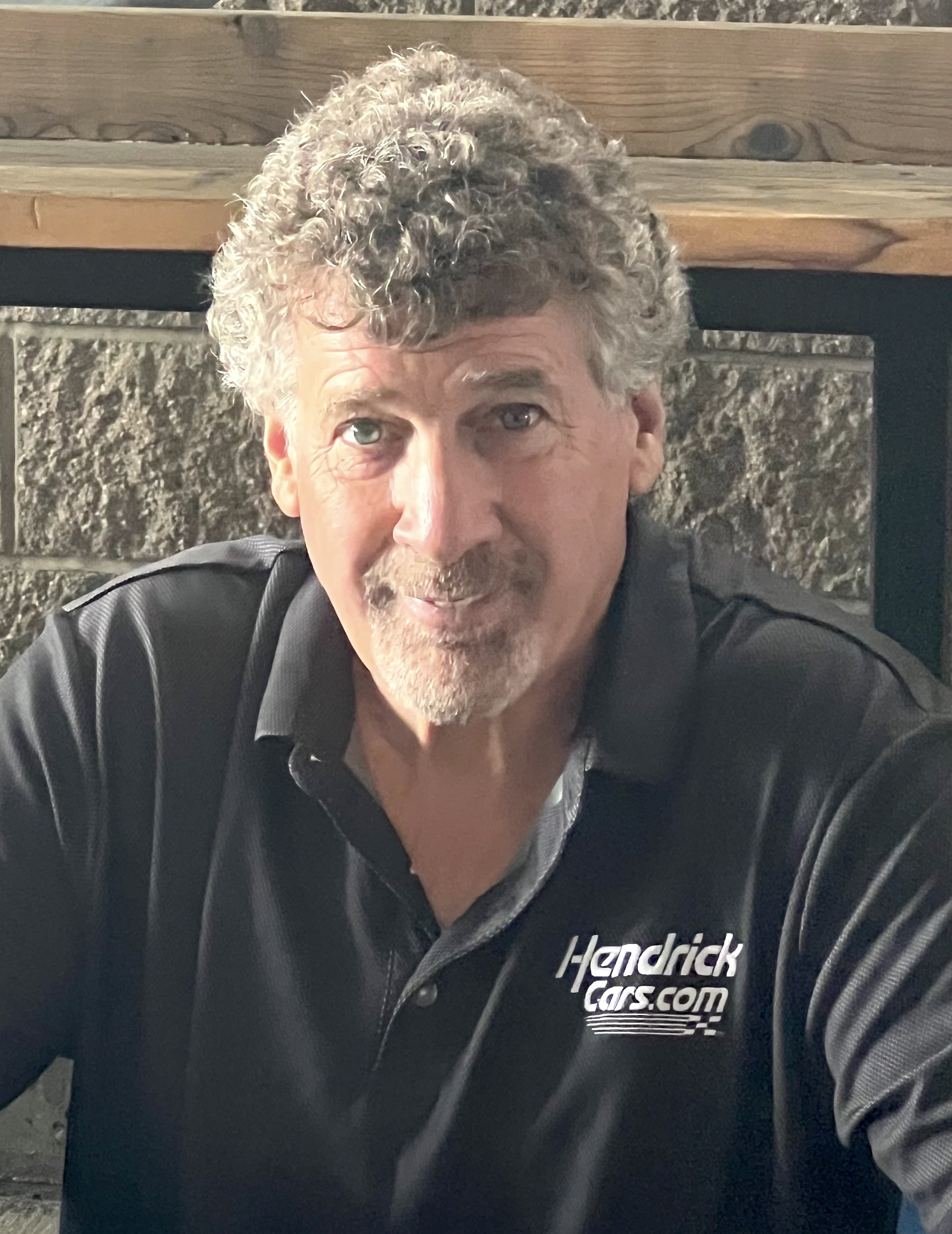
- Said at Sonoma Raceway in 2024
- Born: Boris Robert Said III; September 18, 1962 (age 64); New York City, New York, U.S.
- Achievements: 1997 & 1998 24 Hours of Daytona class winner 1998 12 Hours of Sebring class winner 2004 Rolex Sports Car Series GT Class Champion; 2005 24 Hours Nürburgring winner
- Awards: West Coast Stock Car Hall of Fame (2025)

NASCAR Cup Series career
- 55 races run over 20 years
- 2022 position: 38th
- Best finish: 38th (2022)
- First race: 1999 Frontier at the Glen (Watkins Glen)
- Last race: 2022 Texas Grand Prix (Austin)
Wins	Top tens	Poles
0	8	2

NASCAR O'Reilly Auto Parts Series career
- 30 races run over 13 years
- 2021 position: 68th
- Best finish: 32nd (2015)
- First race: 1998 Lysol 200 (Watkins Glen)
- Last race: 2024 Zip Buy Now, Pay Later 250 (Sonoma)
- First win: 2010 NAPA Auto Parts 200 (Montreal)
Wins	Top tens	Poles
1	9	2

NASCAR FedEx Freight Truck Series career
- 65 races run over 7 years
- 2005 position: 89th
- Best finish: 16th (1997)
- First race: 1995 Subway 100 (Sears Point)
- Last race: 2005 Built Ford Tough 225 (Kentucky)
- First win: 1998 Kragen/Exide 151 (Sears Point)
Wins	Top tens	Poles
1	9	3

Rolex Sports Car Series career
- Debut season: 1998
- Current team: Marsh Racing
- Categorisation: FIA Platinum (until 2012); FIA Gold (2013–2014); FIA Silver (2015–2019)
- Car number: 31
- Starts: 77
- Wins: 10
- Poles: 14
- Best finish: 1st in 2004

Championship titles
- 2004: Rolex Sports Car Series GT Class

24 Hours of Le Mans career
- Years: 1994
- Teams: Callaway Sport Inc.
- Best finish: DNF
- Class wins: 0
- Statistics current as of June 27, 2024.

Boris Robert Said III (born September 18, 1962) is an American professional racing driver. Said has competed in a variety of disciplines including stock cars, sports cars and touring cars.

Said last competed part-time in the NASCAR Xfinity Series, driving the No. 17 Chevrolet Camaro for Hendrick Motorsports. His NASCAR career began in 1995 as a road course ringer primarily due to his success on such tracks; he won one race each in the Xfinity and Truck Series. He routinely ran NASCAR Cup races at road courses, with best results of third at Watkins Glen 2005 and fourth at the 2006 Firecracker 400 at Daytona.

Said served as a factory BMW Motorsport driver, claiming the Rolex Sports Car Series GT drivers title in 2004. He also won overall at the 24 Hours Nürburgring in 2005 and the Six Hours of the Glen in 2006.

His father Boris "Bob" Said was a sports car racer and Olympic bobsledder.

== Racing career ==
=== Early career ===
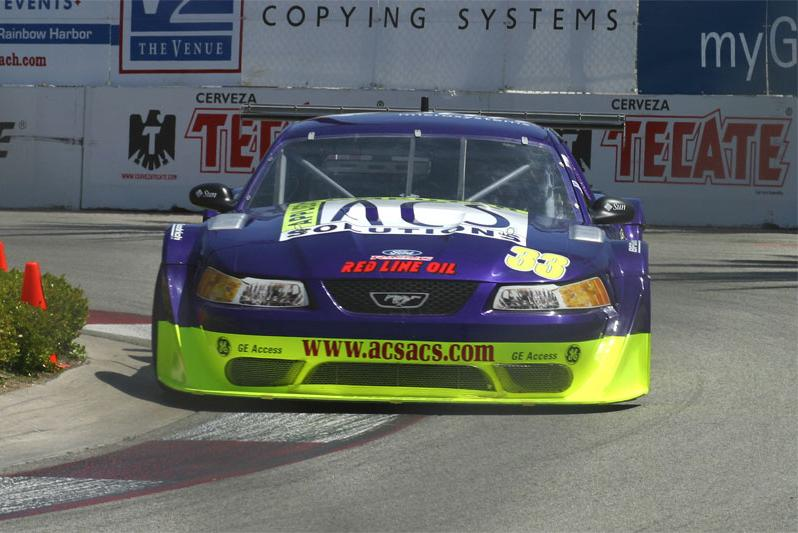
Said competes in a Trans-Am Series race in 2005 at Long Beach

Said's early interest and pursuit was in motocross racing. In 1985, while attending the Detroit Grand Prix as a spectator, he met SCCA champion Bob Sharp.

Said began racing with the SCCA in 1987. Said was named SCCA rookie of the year in 1988. In 1991, he began driving for Baer Racing, later to become Baer Brake Systems. Upon Baer's withdrawal from the series to focus on the manufacturing of brakes in 1992, Said got another big ride driving in the IMSA series in 1993, driving a BMW M3. He won the 1997 and 1998 24 Hours of Daytona and the 1998 12 Hours of Sebring in IMSA. He also became the first American to win the 24 Hours Nürburgring in 2005, driving a BMW Motorsport-entered BMW M3 GTR with co-drivers Pedro Lamy, Duncan Huisman and Andy Priaulx.

=== NASCAR career ===
==== 1995–2000: Truck Series ====
Said made his NASCAR debut in 1995 in the Craftsman Truck Series at Sears Point International Raceway, driving the No. 4 Ford F-150 for Irvan-Simo Racing. He started 25th and finished 24th out of a 26-truck field due to overheating problems. He made three starts the following year driving Irvan's No. 28 1-800-Collect Ford. His best finish was thirteenth, at I-70 Speedway.

Said moved to trucks full time in 1997, in the No. 44 Federated Auto Parts Ford. While his rookie season did not yield any wins, he finished second at the Pronto Auto Parts 400K and finished 16th in the final standings. Said received notice from fans and drivers when he contacted championship contender Rich Bickle at the 1997 October Sonoma truck race. Bickle had blamed Said for causing him to lose a top-five running and made contact that cut down Said's tire. In reply, an angry Said waited for Bickle to come back around and retaliated. Both drivers apologized the next day. Said was fined $15,000 and was suspended until he paid the fine.

The following year, Said won his first career Truck Series race, at Sears Point, in addition to his first truck pole, at Heartland Park Topeka. He also made his Busch Series debut, at Watkins Glen International Raceway, starting on the pole but finishing fortieth in the No. 12 Zippo Chevy owned by Jimmy Spencer. In 1999, Said scaled back on his Truck Series schedule, running only six events. He won poles at Portland and Topeka for Irvan-Simo, as well as driving for Team Racing and Bobby Rahal. He made his Winston Cup debut, at Watkins Glen, qualifying on the outside pole and leading nine laps before his No. 14 Ford suffered engine problems. He also drove at Homestead-Miami Speedway, finishing 34th.

In 2000, Said made what would be his final truck series start for five years, at Portland, finishing fifteenth. After a 30th place run at California Speedway, he returned to the Cup Series, driving the No. 23 for Jimmy Spencer, and finished 42nd at Sears Point. He also attempted the Cup race at Watkins Glen but failed to qualify due to a lack of owner's points.

==== 2001–2005 ====
Said saw limited action in 2001, as a warrant for his arrest was issued relating to a civil lawsuit dating back to 1989, though the situation was settled out-of-court soon afterwards, allowing Said to resume his career. He would go on to finish fourth in a Busch Series race at Watkins Glen in a Robbie Reiser-owned car and drove a pair of races for Jasper Motorsports. He competed for the win in the 2001 Cup Series race at the Glen. While running third on the final restart, Said tried to make a pass by Jeff Burton to try to take the lead from the dominant car of Jeff Gordon but got held up in traffic, causing him to slip back to eighth place, scoring his first top-ten of his Cup Series career.

After running with Jasper again in 2002, Said served as a fill-in driver for Jerry Nadeau at MB2/MBV Motorsports. He won the pole for the Sears Point race in California. He stayed in the top-ten all race. With pit strategies, it seemed like the win would come down to Said and fellow road ace Ron Fellows. However, Said and Fellows forgot to pit when they were told to before a caution came out. Because they did not pit before the caution with 38 laps to go, Said and Fellows lost their shot at the win. Said restarted 26th and recovered for sixth place. At Watkins Glen, Said would have a very fast No. 01 Pontiac driving through the field towards the front, only to be taken out by Robby Gordon who would go on to win the race. In a post-race interview, and in the years afterwards, Said would claim that the 2003 Watkins Glen race was the biggest disappointment of his racing career, as it was the best car he had ever driven.

Said signed on to drive a limited schedule for the team in 2004, running the No. 36 Centrix Financial Chevrolet, and finished sixth once again at Sears Point. The team expanded to run more races for 2005, where his best finish in nine starts was a third at Watkins Glen. During that season, he returned to the truck series, finishing 35th at Kentucky Speedway while filling for an injured Rick Crawford. He also ran two races in the Busch Series for Phoenix Racing and had a fifth place finish at Autodromo Hermanos Rodriguez in Mexico City. At year's end, Said and the MB2 team parted ways after Centrix Financial went bankrupt.

==== 2006–2008 ====
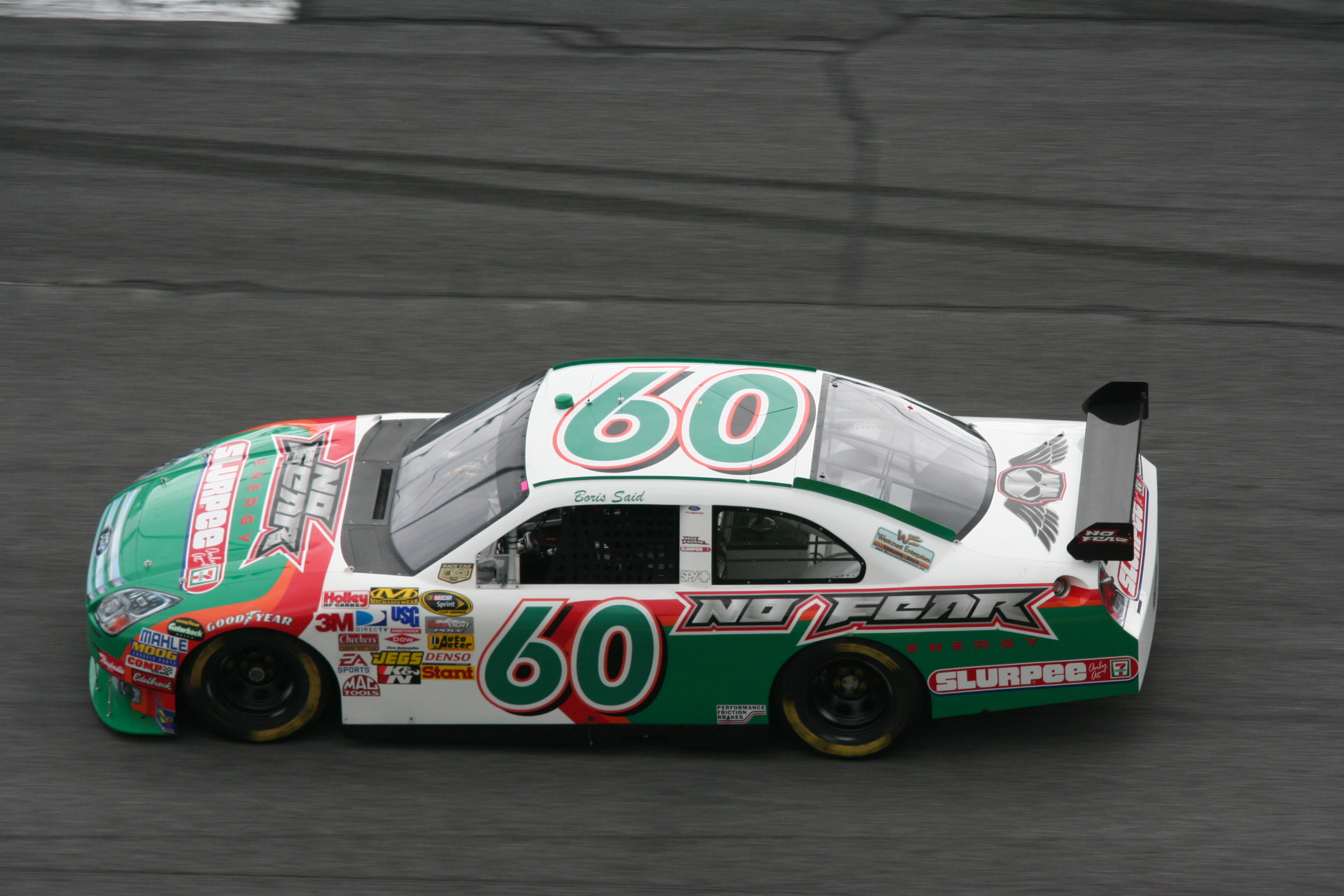
2008 Cup car at Daytona

Said joined Evernham Motorsports to help the team's road-course program in 2006. He won the pole at Mexico City and finished second, as well as driving the No. 4 Geico Dodge Charger for Biagi-DenBeste Racing at Lowe's Motor Speedway, starting 40th and finishing 31st. In May 2006, Said and crew chief Frank Stoddard and Mark Simo announced the creation of No Fear Racing, which used equipment from Roush Fenway Racing. They ran four Cup races starting with the Dodge/Save Mart 350 at Infineon Raceway. He won the pole at the Pepsi 400, his first Nextel Cup pole on an oval, in one of the biggest upsets in Daytona history. Following his pole win, he promised a pit reporter that if he either won the race, the race at Watkins Glen International or an NNS race within three years, that he would shave his head, come to the channel the next week and show everybody. He was leading the race with three laps to go and was passed by his friend Tony Stewart; after two more laps, he finished fourth—his highest career NASCAR finish on an oval track. In a post-race interview, Said emotionally said his performance in the Pepsi 400 was "the highlight of my career."

At Watkins Glen, Said had originally finished sixth, but hours after the race was over he was to 31st place by officials due to a scoring error. Years later, it was revealed that Said and fellow road-course ringer Ron Fellows had each been given a thirt-second penalty for having made illegal passes through the inner-loop on the final lap.

Said qualified and ran in the 2007 Daytona 500. Although he was not in the top 35 teams from the 2006 owner's points, Said posted the fastest qualifying time among non-locked teams and the sixth-fastest qualifying time overall. Starting in 23rd position, Said dropped back to last place near the beginning of the race and had no hope of regaining enough speed to finish well. However, he got a good finish when he managed to avoid a massive crash at the finish and cross the line in fourteenth place, behind winner Kevin Harvick. Said finished ninth at Sonoma but failed to qualify at Daytona and Watkins Glen due to rain.

Said failed to qualify for the 2008 Daytona 500 but had a productive NNS season. Following an incident with Marcos Ambrose at Mexico City that wrecked his car, Said angrily wagged his finger at Ambrose when he passed by to lap him down. Said initially vowed payback against Ambrose, but he ultimately moved forward. Said came back and finished fifth in Montreal that year. The following week, Said drove one race at Watkins Glen for Jimmy Means in partnership between Means and No Fear. Due to the weather, qualifying was rained out, and the No. 60 car failed to qualify. Said instead drove the No. 45 car for Petty Enterprises.

==== 2009–2010 ====
No Fear Racing merged with the No. 08 E&M Motorsports car in 2009 to become Carter-Simo Racing, and Said qualified for the races at Infineon and Watkins Glen in the No. 08. He also attempted the Daytona 500 in the same car, but failed to qualify for the race for the second straight year.

Said drove the No. 26 for Latitude 43 Motorsports in 2010. He also announced a one-year deal to drive the No. 09 Zaxby's NNS Ford for RAB Racing in the Nationwide series road-course events. He ran the first four races and Infineon. His crew chief, Frank Stoddard, was livid with Tony Stewart for contact on the final lap of the Infineon race and confronted him in the garage, but Said did not take part in it and apologized for his team's behavior the next day. The cars used were former Roush Fenway Racing Fords, and the team, which finished 22nd in 2009 and was sold to satisfy NASCAR's four-cars-per-team rule, had exemptions for the first five races of 2010. By August 2010, Said stated that he did not expect to be back with Latitude 43. Said received a one-race deal from Red Bull Racing at Watkins Glen to replace an ill Brian Vickers. He was having a good run, but in the ending laps, he made contact with Stewart that took him out of contention to win.

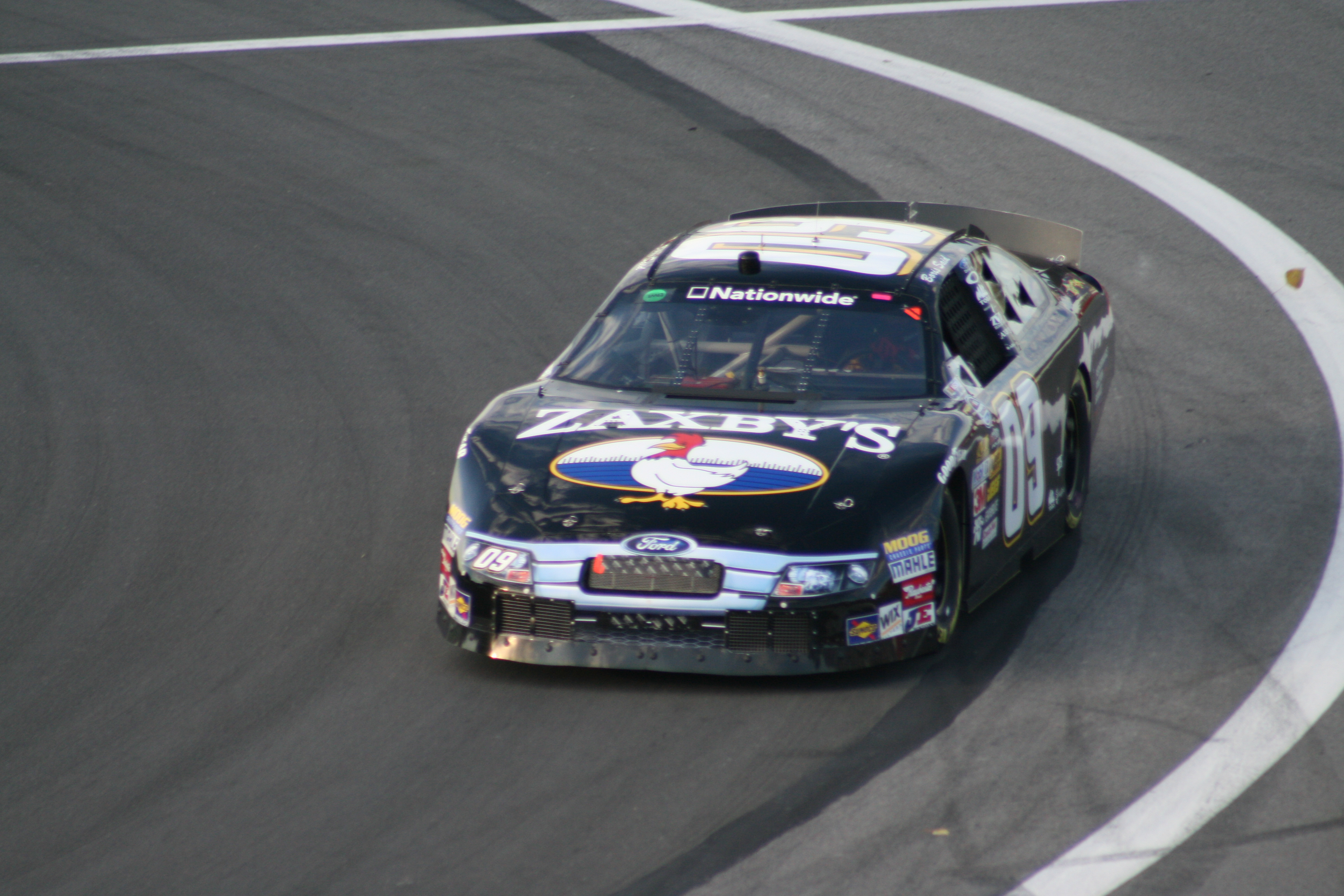
Said's car in which he won at Montreal in 2010.

Meanwhile, Said had a successful NNS season. On August 29, 2010, Said led the rest of the race after Robby Gordon ran out of gas with three laps to go and won his long-desired first NASCAR Nationwide Series race at the Circuit Gilles Villeneuve in Montreal. His close friend, who he had raced with in F1 and NNS before, Italian driver Max Papis, passed him in the final turn to try to win, but a mistake by jumping over the curb too high cost him the win. Said passed Papis after the mistake, and they raced to the finish. By the time they reached the line, Said was a bumper ahead of Papis (The finish resembled the 2009 Montreal finish, where Australian driver Marcos Ambrose dominated but made the same mistake Papis made, handing the win to Carl Edwards). Said received huge TV attention for his victory.

==== 2011: Phoenix Racing and Watkins Glen incident ====
Said drove for Phoenix Racing in the Sprint Cup Series road-course events in 2011. During the 2011 Heluva Good! Sour Cream Dips at the Glen, Boris was involved in a heated incident with Greg Biffle. On the final lap of the race, Said was involved in a collision with Biffle's teammate David Ragan which ended with David Reutimann flipping over into the guardrails. Post-race, Said and Biffle had a garage confrontation in which Biffle reportedly took a swing at Said and then gestured profanely at him. Boris tried to attack Biffle physically, only to be held back by crew members from Paul Menard's team, FAS Lane Racing, and Biffle's team.

After the race, Said apologized for wrecking Ragan but angrily retorted:

I'm more upset with Greg Biffle, he is the most unprofessional little scaredy cat I've ever seen in my life, he won't even fight me like a man. So if someone texts me his address, I’ll go see him Wednesday at his house and show him what he really needs. He needs a friggin’ whooping, and I’m going to give it to him. He was flipping me off, giving the finger, totally unprofessional. Two laps down, I mean, he's a chump ... I went over there to go talk to him, and he wouldn't even let me get out of the car, and he comes over and throws a few little baby punches, and when I get out, he runs away and hides behind some big guys. But he won't hide from me long, I'll find him. I won't settle it out on the track - it's not right to wreck cars - but he'll show up at a race with a black eye one of these days. I'll see him somewhere.

The incident was investigated by NASCAR officials, but no penalties were given, with Biffle and Said later settling their dispute with a phone call. Said received a late call up from Turner Scott Motorsports to run the 2011 NAPA Auto Parts 200 Nationwide Series race in Montreal in the No. 30 Great Clips Chevrolet.

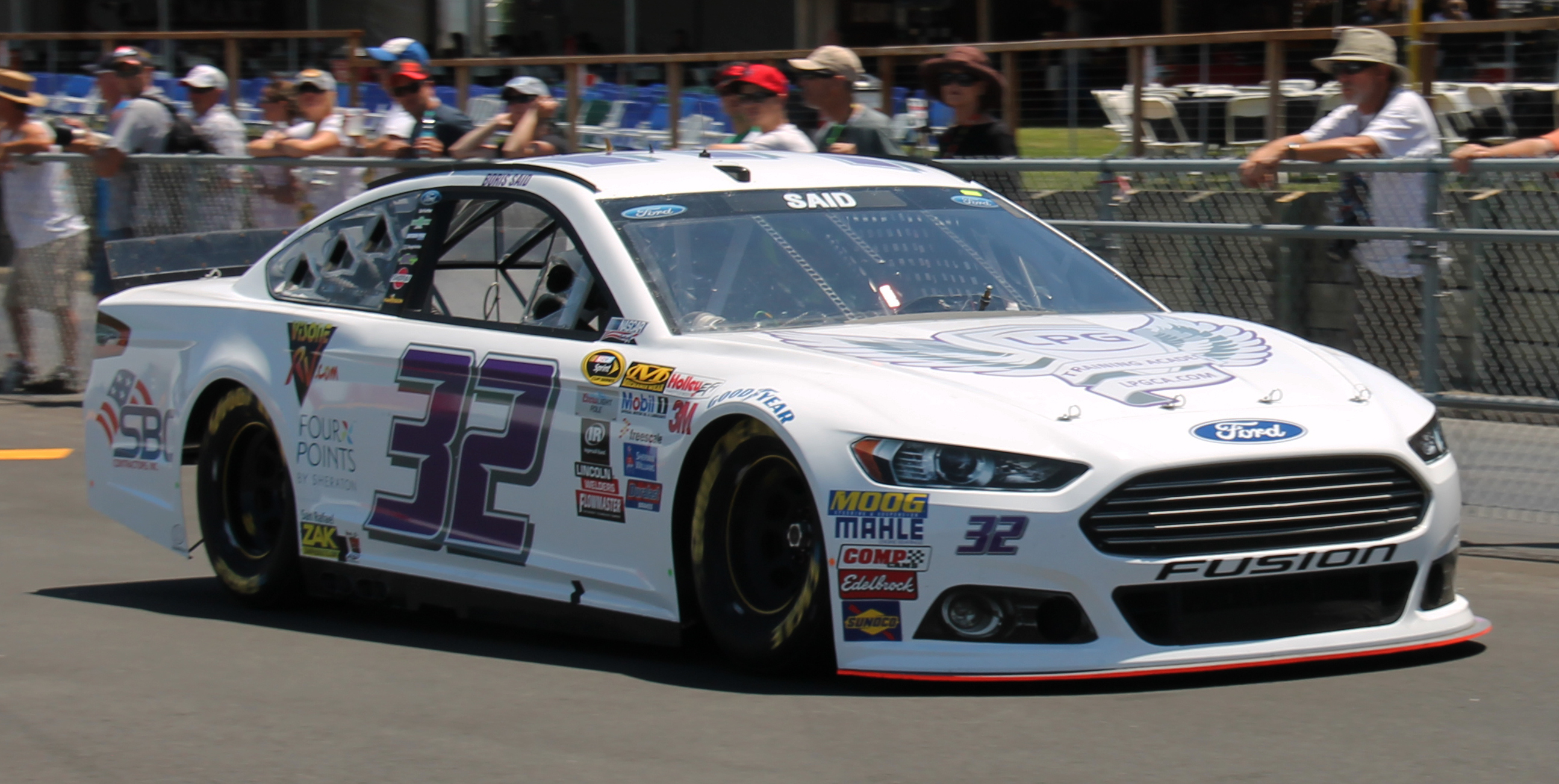
Said in the No. 32 Loss Prevention Group car at the 2015 Toyota/Save Mart 350

==== 2012–2014: FAS Lane Racing ====
Said reunited with Frank Stoddard in 2012 to run the Sprint Cup Series road course races for Stoddard's race team that he formed in 2011, FAS Lane Racing. He returned for the same two races in 2013, and in 2014, now renamed Go FAS Racing after the team merged with Nationwide Series team Go Green Racing.

==== 2015–2017: 2 planned retirements, Go FAS Racing, Joe Gibbs Racing, and Circle Sport-TMG ====
For 2015, Said returned to the No. 32 for the fourth straight year to run Sonoma and Watkins Glen. At Sonoma, he finished 26th. In early March 2015, Said was picked to drive the No. 54 Monster Energy car in the Xfinity Series for Joe Gibbs Racing, substituting for an injured Kyle Busch. Said raced at Talladega, both Iowa races, Chicagoland, Mid-Ohio, Road America and Kentucky in the 2015 season. At Talladega during the Aaron's 312, Said ran as high as second, but as the race got competitive during the final 25 laps, he finished 16th. At Iowa, Said brought home a top-24 finish. Because Busch returned earlier than expected, Said was not needed for the Chicagoland races and the next Iowa race. However, Said was called on to replace Busch during the three road-course events including the Zippo 200, as Busch withdrew from that race to continue his healing process of his leg. His best finish in the No. 54 was a fourth at Watkins Glen during the 2015 Zippo 200. In the last of his starts in the JGR No. 54 at Road America, Said announced that it could likely be his final NASCAR start. This had appeared to be the case as Said did not enter the 2016 Toyota/Save Mart 350 (Patrick Carpentier was instead in the No. 32), which was the first time since 1998 that he was not entered in the Cup Series race at Sonoma, and the first time since 1999 that he was not in the race itself. However, Said did end up returning to the No. 32 at Watkins Glen, and he would finish 24th.

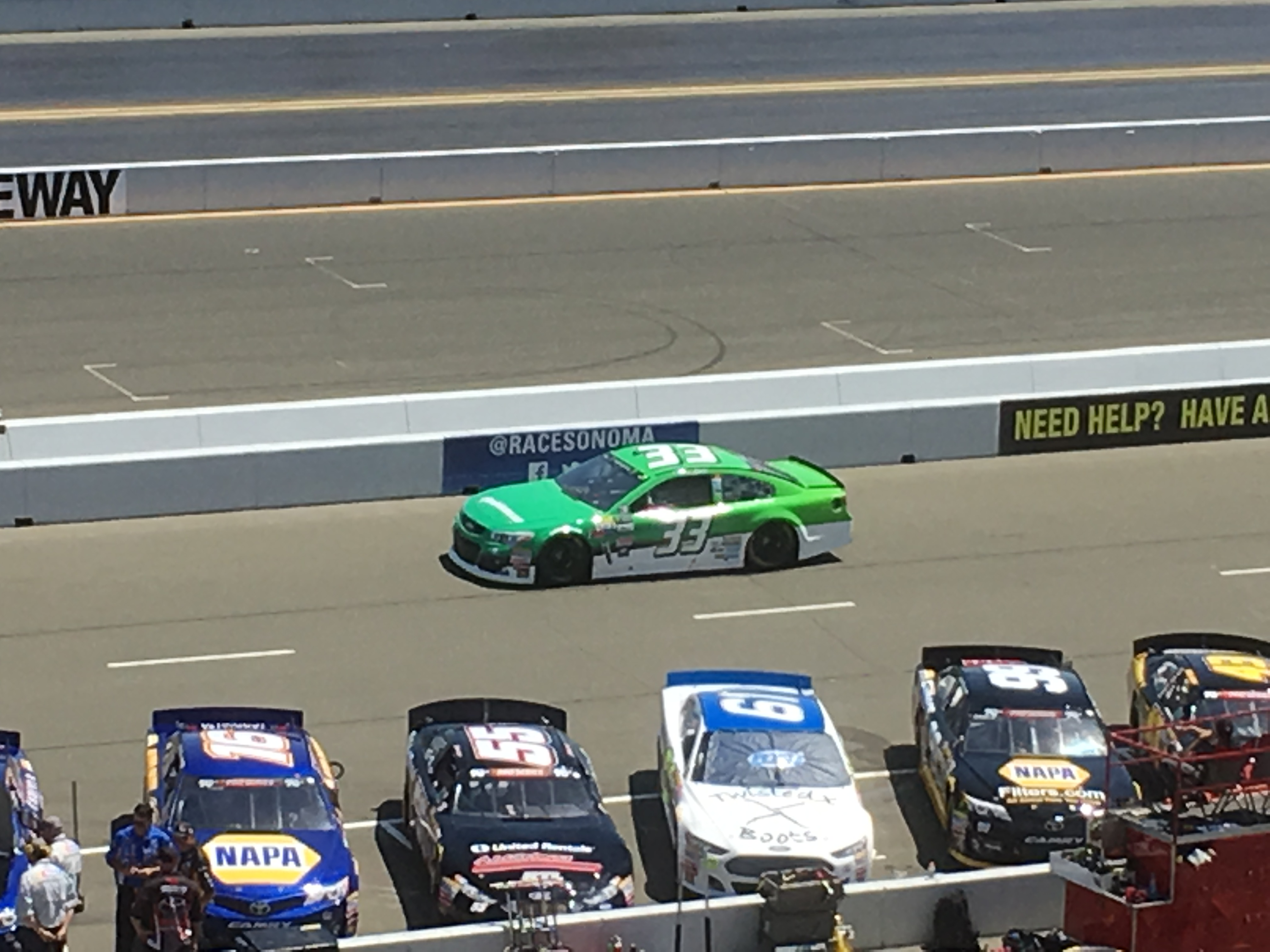
Said driving through pit road in the Circle Sport-TMG No. 33 during the 2017 Sonoma race weekend

With Go FAS Racing hiring one full season driver, Matt DiBenedetto, for the first time in 2017, Said was left out of the No. 32. On June 20, 2017, Said announced that he would drive the No. 33 Chevrolet SS for Circle Sport – The Motorsports Group for Sonoma, replacing Jeffrey Earnhardt. This was the first Cup Series team that Said drove for in the last five years other than GFR. He ran as high as twelfth at Sonoma and finished 29th. Later that season, Said announced during the week of the Watkins Glen race that the 2017 I Love New York 355 at The Glen would be his final NASCAR race. He finished thirtieth in that race.

==== 2021–2023: Return to NASCAR ====
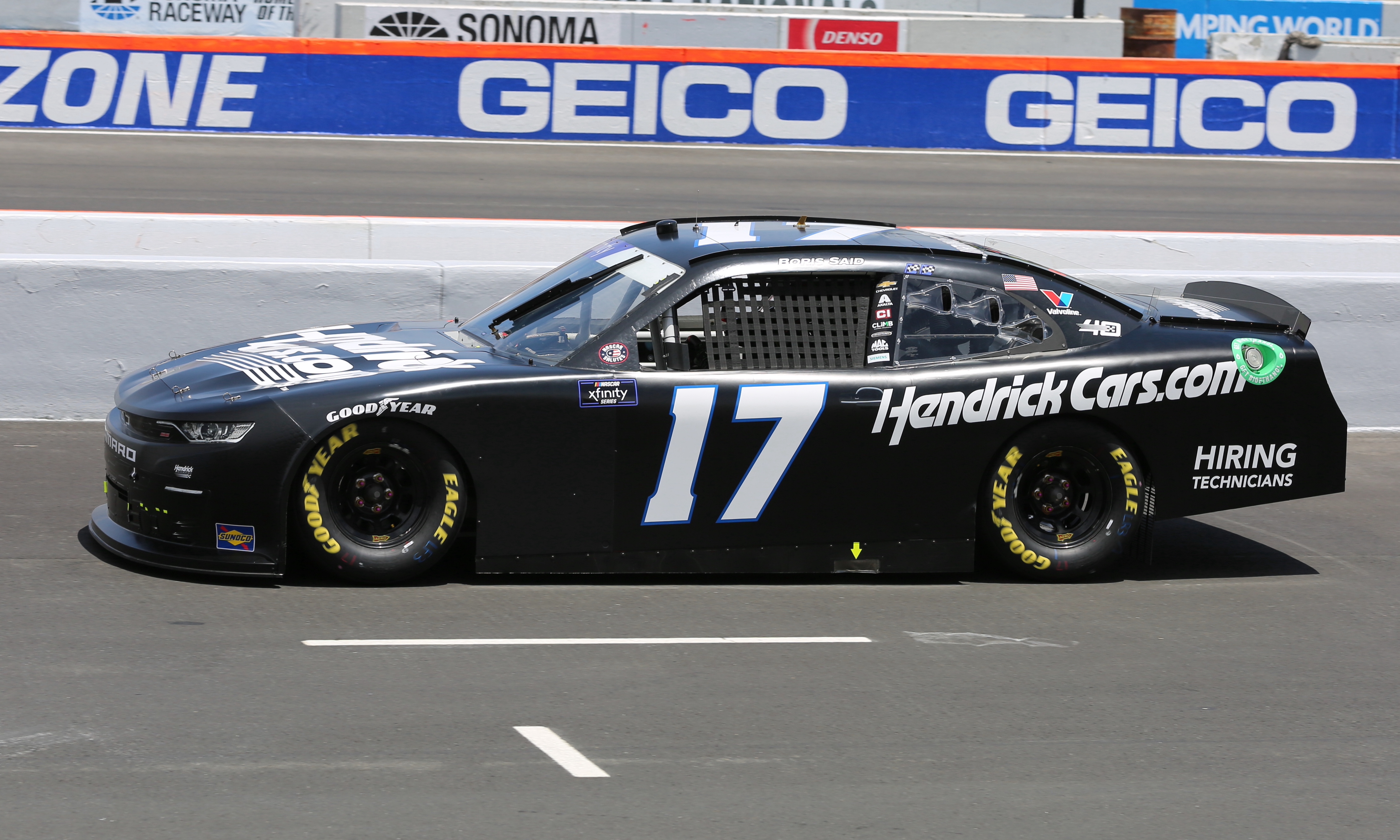
Said's No. 17 car at Sonoma Raceway in 2024

On May 17, 2021, it was revealed through the release of the entry list for the Xfinity Series race at Circuit of the Americas that Said would drive the No. 13 for MBM Motorsports. It is his first NASCAR start since 2017 and his first Xfinity Series start since 2015. Said also attempted to qualify for the Xfinity Series race at Road America, but would fail to qualify.

On March 11, 2022, MBM Motorsports announced on their Facebook page that Said would be entering the Texas Grand Prix in the No. 66 Ford Mustang, in his first Cup Series start since 2017. Said started the race 37th, the slowest time set during qualifying. He finished the race 26th.

On September 26, 2023, Hendrick Motorsports announced that Said would race the No. 17 Chevrolet in the Xfinity Series at the Charlotte ROVAL race. Said and team owner Rick Hendrick had previously been business partners. “If I do well in this race, it’ll definitely be my last for sure in NASCAR." Said announced after the announcement. Said would fail to qualify after experiencing a mechanical issue in qualifying, marking the first time since 2007 that a Hendrick Motorsports car would fail to qualify in the Xfinity Series.

=== American Le Mans Series ===
Said competed for the PTG Racing Group in the 2000 season, driving a BMW M3 in the GT category, and managed to win at Laguna Seca.

The PTG Team finished third overall in the GT category that year.

Said was listed as a driver on the 2011 24 Hours of Le Mans LM GTE Am class entry of Robertson Racing.

=== V8 Supercars ===
Said was entered into round nine of the Australian V8 Supercar series, the L&H 500 at Phillip Island, Victoria, that took place on the weekend of 12–14 September 2008. He drove the No. 67 Supercheap Auto with Matt Neal. They finished the race in nineteenth.

This deal also included racing at the 2008 Supercheap Auto Bathurst 1000 at Mount Panorama Circuit near Bathurst, New South Wales. This took place from the ninth to the 12th of October 2008 and was by far the largest event on the Australian touring car calendar. Said failed to finish the race after his teammate Matt Neal crashed the car.

Said returned to the category to drive alongside Steve Owen in the 2011 Armor All Gold Coast 600 with Paul Morris Motorsport, finishing in eighteenth on Saturday and seventh on Sunday.

=== X Games ===
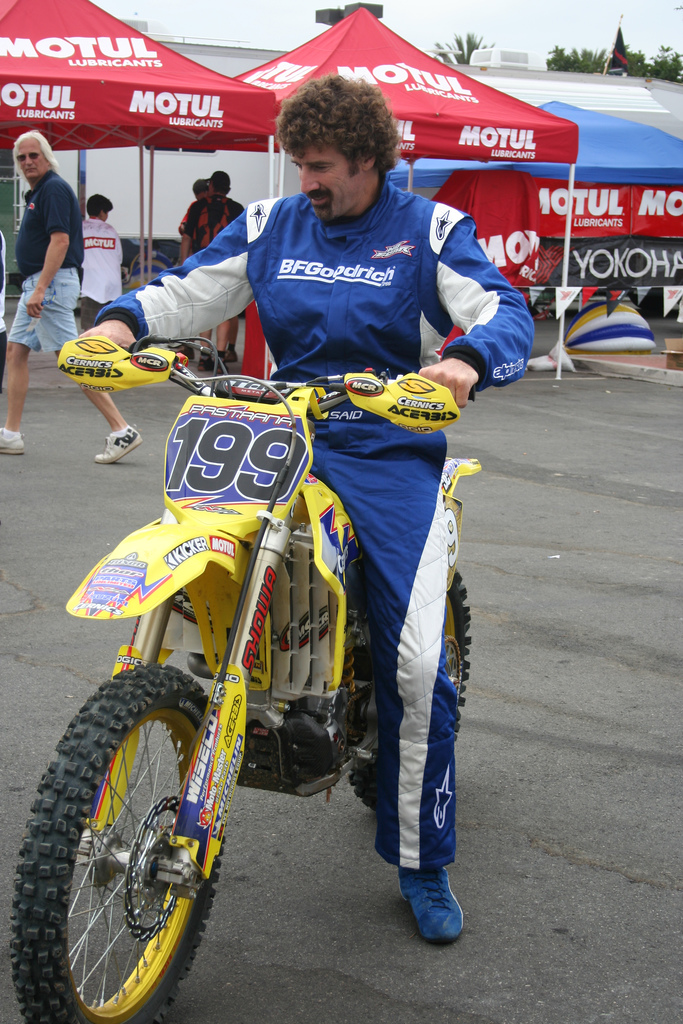
Said tests Travis Pastrana's motocross bike at X Games XIII

Said has competed in the X Games twice. He was invited as an "at-large" rally car entry for the X Games XIII at the Home Depot Center in Los Angeles, on August 5, 2007. Said was joined by American rally car racing legend John Buffum as his co-driver.

Said returned to the X Games at Austin in 2015, competing in the Stadium Super Trucks category. He finished fourth of five trucks in his heat race and was forced to contest the last-chance qualifier; he finished fourth in the LCQ and missed the final.

=== Trans-Am Series ===
While attempting his career in the NASCAR Winston Cup Series in the early-2000's, Said had a tremendous career in Trans-Am Series racing. He has won over 40 races in SCCA racing, including in Trans-Am and IMSA. Said also captured the 2002 Trans-Am Series championship during a season where he won all but four races. In 2003, Said's career in Trans-Am came to a halt when he found himself at odds with series officials, sitting out a 45-day suspension for alleged "unprofessional conduct". Said would not be active in Trans-Am competition until 2019 when he returned to the series.

In 2021, Said competed in the Trans-Am Series Pirelli Atlanta SpeedTour at Road Atlanta, which he would win, as well as the SpeedFest at Laguna Seca, both in the No. 2 Dodge for Weaver Technologies Racing.

== Personal life ==
Said's father, Bob Said, drove in a Formula One race in 1959 as well as a NASCAR Cup Series race in the same year, in the 1959 Daytona 500, and was also a United States Olympic bobsled driver in 1968 and 1972.

Said was a co-founder of apparel and action-sports company No Fear, which sponsored much of his racing career. He also established Honda and Suzuki motorcycle dealerships when he was 21 years old. In 2011 he founded a BMW car dealership in Murrieta, California. He is also a co-owner of the K1 Speed go-kart racetrack franchise.

Said's son, Boris Jr, is also a racing driver and competed in dirt bikes and go-karts before making his debut in the Trans-Am Series in the race at Road Atlanta in 2020.

== Motorsports career results ==
=== SCCA national championship runoffs ===
Year	Track	Car	Engine	Class	Finish	Start	Status
1988	Road Atlanta	Chevrolet Corvette	Chevrolet	Showroom stock GT	18	3	Running
1989	Road Atlanta	Chevrolet Camaro	Chevrolet	Showroom stock GT	1	1	Running
1990	Road Atlanta	Chevrolet Corvette	Chevrolet	Showroom stock GT	1	1	Running
1991	Road Atlanta	Oldsmobile Cutlass	Oldsmobile	GT1	17	4	Retired
1991	Road Atlanta	Chevrolet Camaro	Chevrolet	Showroom stock GT	1	1	Running
1992	Road Atlanta	Chevrolet Corvette	Chevrolet	Showroom stock GT	24	2	Retired

=== Complete 24 Hours of Le Mans results ===
Year	Team	Co-drivers	Car	Class	Laps	Pos.	Class pos.
1994	(United States) Callaway Sport Inc.	(Germany) Frank Jelinski (France) Michel Maisonneuve	Callaway Corvette SuperNatural	GT2	142	DSQ	DSQ

=== NASCAR ===
(key) (Bold – Pole position awarded by qualifying time. Italics – Pole position earned by points standings or practice time. * – Most laps led.)

==== Cup Series ====
NASCAR Cup Series results
Year	Team	No.	Make	1	2	3	4	5	6	7	8	9	10	11	12	13	14	15	16	17	18	19	20	21	22	23	24	25	26	27	28	29	30	31	32	33	34	35	36	NSCC	Pts	Ref
1999	Irvan-Simo Racing	14	Ford	DAY	CAR	LVS	ATL	DAR	TEX	BRI	MAR	TAL	CAL; DNQ	RCH	CLT	DOV	MCH	POC	SON; DNQ	DAY	NHA	POC	IND; DNQ	GLN; 42	MCH	BRI	DAR	RCH	NHA	DOV	MAR	CLT	TAL	CAR	PHO	HOM; 34	ATL			59th	103	
2000	Spencer Motor Ventures	23	Ford	DAY	CAR	LVS	ATL	DAR	BRI	TEX	MAR	TAL	CAL	RCH	CLT	DOV	MCH	POC	SON; 42	DAY	NHA	POC	IND																	71st	37	
2000	Spencer Motor Ventures	23	Chevy																					GLN; DNQ	MCH	BRI	DAR	RCH	NHA	DOV	MAR	CLT	TAL	CAR	PHO	HOM	ATL			71st	37	
2001	Jasper Motorsports	77	Ford	DAY	CAR	LVS	ATL	DAR	BRI	TEX	MAR	TAL	CAL	RCH	CLT	DOV	MCH	POC	SON; 11	DAY	CHI	NHA	POC	IND	GLN; 8	MCH	BRI	DAR	RCH	DOV	KAN	CLT	MAR	TAL	PHO	CAR	HOM	ATL	NHA	50th	272	
2002	Jasper Motorsports	67	Ford	DAY	CAR	LVS	ATL	DAR	BRI	TEX	MAR	TAL	CAL	RCH	CLT	DOV	POC	MCH	SON; 41	DAY	CHI	NHA	POC	IND	GLN; 13	MCH	BRI	DAR	RCH	NHA	DOV	KAN	TAL	CLT	MAR	ATL	CAR	PHO	HOM; DNQ	59th	164	
2003	MB2 Motorsports	01	Pontiac	DAY	CAR	LVS	ATL	DAR	BRI	TEX	TAL	MAR	CAL	RCH	CLT	DOV	POC	MCH	**SON**; 6	DAY	CHI	NHA	POC	IND	GLN; 39	MCH	BRI	DAR	RCH	NHA	DOV	TAL	KAN	CLT	MAR	ATL	PHO	CAR	HOM	55th	201	
2004	MB2 Motorsports	36	Chevy	DAY	CAR	LVS	ATL	DAR	BRI	TEX	MAR	TAL	CAL	RCH	CLT	DOV	POC	MCH	SON; 6	DAY	CHI	NHA	POC	IND	GLN; DNQ	MCH	BRI	CAL; 30	RCH	NHA	DOV	TAL	KAN	CLT	MAR	ATL	PHO	DAR	HOM; 28	55th	302	
2005	MB Sutton Motorsports	36	Chevy	DAY; 27	CAL	LVS	ATL	BRI	MAR	TEX; 27	PHO	TAL; 35	DAR	RCH	CLT; DNQ	DOV	POC	MCH	SON; 17	DAY; 28	CHI	NHA	POC	IND; 31	GLN; 3	MCH	BRI	CAL; 30	RCH	NHA	DOV	TAL	KAN; 31	CLT; DNQ	MAR	ATL; DNQ	TEX	PHO	HOM	42nd	791	
2006	No Fear Racing	60	Ford	DAY	CAL	LVS	ATL	BRI	MAR	TEX	PHO	TAL	RCH	DAR	CLT	DOV	POC	MCH	SON; 9	**DAY**; 4	CHI	NHA	POC	IND; 42	GLN; 31	MCH	BRI	CAL	RCH	NHA	DOV	KAN	TAL	CLT	MAR	ATL	TEX	PHO	HOM	47th	415	
2007	No Fear Racing	60	Ford	DAY; 14	CAL	LVS	ATL	BRI	MAR	TEX	PHO	TAL; 27	RCH	DAR	CLT	DOV	POC	MCH	SON; 9	NHA	DAY; DNQ	CHI	IND	POC	GLN; DNQ								TAL; DNQ	CLT	MAR	ATL	TEX	PHO	HOM	51st	510	
2007	Wood Brothers Racing	21	Ford																						GLN; 14	MCH	BRI	CAL	RCH											51st	510	
2007	Gillett Evernham Motorsports	98	Dodge																											NHA; 40	DOV	KAN								51st	510	
2008	No Fear Racing	60	Ford	DAY; DNQ	CAL	LVS	ATL	BRI	MAR	TEX	PHO	TAL	RCH	DAR	CLT	DOV	POC	MCH	SON; 41	NHA	DAY; 35	CHI	IND	POC	GLN; DNQ															58th	194	
2008	Petty Enterprises	45	Dodge																						GLN; 24	MCH	BRI	CAL	RCH	NHA	DOV	KAN	TAL	CLT	MAR	ATL	TEX	PHO	HOM	58th	194	
2009	Carter Simo Racing	08	Ford	DAY; DNQ	CAL	LVS	ATL	BRI	MAR	TEX	PHO	TAL	RCH	DAR	CLT	DOV	POC	MCH	SON; 24	NHA	DAY	CHI	IND	POC	GLN; 34	MCH	BRI	ATL	RCH	NHA	DOV	KAN	CAL	CLT	MAR	TAL	TEX	PHO	HOM	57th	152	
2010	Latitude 43 Motorsports	26	Ford	DAY; 25	CAL; 38	LVS; 40	ATL; 32	BRI	MAR	PHO	TEX	TAL	RCH	DAR	DOV	CLT	POC	MCH	SON; 8	NHA	DAY	CHI	IND	POC																52nd	448	
2010	Team Red Bull	83	Toyota																						GLN; 38	MCH	BRI	ATL	RCH	NHA	DOV	KAN	CAL	CLT	MAR	TAL	TEX	PHO	HOM	52nd	448	
2011	Phoenix Racing	51	Chevy	DAY	PHO	LVS	BRI	CAL	MAR	TEX	TAL	RCH	DAR	DOV	CLT	KAN	POC	MCH	SON; 28	DAY	KEN	NHA	IND	POC	GLN; 22	MCH	BRI	ATL	RCH	CHI	NHA	DOV	KAN	CLT	TAL	MAR	TEX	PHO	HOM	43rd	38	
2012	FAS Lane Racing	32	Ford	DAY	PHO	LVS	BRI	CAL	MAR	TEX	KAN	RCH	TAL	DAR	CLT	DOV	POC	MCH	SON; 29	KEN	DAY	NHA	IND	POC	GLN; 25	MCH	BRI	ATL	RCH	CHI	NHA	DOV	TAL	CLT	KAN	MAR	TEX	PHO	HOM	48th	34	
2013	FAS Lane Racing	32	Ford	DAY	PHO	LVS	BRI	CAL	MAR	TEX	KAN	RCH	TAL	DAR	CLT	DOV	POC	MCH	SON; 18	KEN	DAY	NHA	IND	POC	GLN; 22	MCH	BRI	ATL	RCH	CHI	NHA	DOV	KAN	CLT	TAL	MAR	TEX	PHO	HOM	43rd	48	
2014	Go FAS Racing	32	Ford	DAY	PHO	LVS	BRI	CAL	MAR	TEX	DAR	RCH	TAL	KAN	CLT	DOV	POC	MCH	SON; 35	KEN	DAY	NHA	IND	POC	GLN; 25	MCH	BRI	ATL	RCH	CHI	NHA	DOV	KAN	CLT	TAL	MAR	TEX	PHO	HOM	52nd	28	
2015	Go FAS Racing	32	Ford	DAY	ATL	LVS	PHO	CAL	MAR	TEX	BRI	RCH	TAL	KAN	CLT	DOV	POC	MCH	SON; 26	DAY	KEN	NHA	IND	POC	GLN; 32	MCH	BRI	DAR	RCH	CHI	NHA	DOV	CLT	KAN	TAL	MAR	TEX	PHO	HOM	63rd	0^{1}	
2016	Go FAS Racing	32	Ford	DAY	ATL	LVS	PHO	CAL	MAR	TEX	BRI	RCH	TAL	KAN	DOV	CLT	POC	MCH	SON	DAY	KEN	NHA	IND	POC	GLN; 24	BRI	MCH	DAR	RCH	CHI	NHA	DOV	CLT	KAN	TAL	MAR	TEX	PHO	HOM	46th	17	
2017	Circle Sport – The Motorsports Group	33	Chevy	DAY	ATL	LVS	PHO	CAL	MAR	TEX	BRI	RCH	TAL	KAN	CLT	DOV	POC	MCH	SON; 29	DAY	KEN	NHA	IND	POC	GLN; 30	MCH	BRI	DAR	RCH	CHI	NHA	DOV	CLT	TAL	KAN	MAR	TEX	PHO	HOM	41st	15	
2022	MBM Motorsports	66	Ford	DAY	CAL	LVS	PHO	ATL	COA; 26	RCH	MAR	BRD	TAL	DOV	DAR	KAN	CLT	GTW	SON	NSH	ROA	ATL	NHA	POC	IRC	MCH	RCH	GLN	DAY	DAR	KAN	BRI	TEX	TAL	ROV	LVS	HOM	MAR	PHO	38th	11	

===== Daytona 500 =====
Year	Team	Manufacturer	Start	Finish
2005	MB Sutton Motorsports	Chevrolet	41	27
2007	No Fear Racing	Ford	23	14
2008	No Fear Racing	Ford	DNQ	
2009	Carter Simo Racing	Ford	DNQ	
2010	Latitude 43 Motorsports	Ford	38	25

==== Xfinity Series ====
NASCAR Xfinity Series results
Year	Team	No.	Make	1	2	3	4	5	6	7	8	9	10	11	12	13	14	15	16	17	18	19	20	21	22	23	24	25	26	27	28	29	30	31	32	33	34	35	NXSC	Pts	Ref
1998	Spencer Motor Ventures	12	Chevy	DAY	CAR	LVS	NSV	DAR	BRI	TEX	HCY	TAL	NHA	NZH	CLT	DOV	RCH	PPR	**GLN**; 40	MLW	MYB	CAL	SBO	IRP	MCH	BRI	DAR	RCH	DOV	CLT	GTY	CAR	ATL	HOM					117th	43	
2000	Spencer Motor Ventures	12	Chevy	DAY	CAR	LVS; DNQ	ATL	DAR	BRI	TEX	NSV	TAL	CAL; 30	RCH	NHA	CLT	DOV	SBO	MYB	GLN	MLW	NZH	PPR	GTY	IRP	MCH	BRI	DAR	RCH	DOV	CLT	CAR	MEM	PHO	HOM				102nd	73	
2001	Reiser Enterprises	17	Chevy	DAY	CAR	LVS	ATL	DAR	BRI	TEX	NSH	TAL	CAL	RCH	NHA	NZH	CLT	DOV	KEN	MLW	GLN; 4	CHI	GTY	PPR	IRP	MCH	BRI	DAR	RCH	DOV	KAN	CLT	MEM	PHO	CAR	HOM			90th	160	
2005	Phoenix Racing	1	Dodge	DAY	CAL	MXC; 5	LVS	ATL	NSH	BRI	TEX	PHO	TAL	DAR	RCH	CLT	DOV	NSH	KEN	MLW	DAY	CHI	NHA	PPR	GTY	IRP													92nd	207	
2005	Phoenix Racing	09	Dodge																								GLN; 37	MCH	BRI	CAL	RCH	DOV	KAN	CLT	MEM	TEX	PHO	HOM	92nd	207	
2006	Evernham Motorsports	9	Dodge	DAY	CAL	**MXC**; 2	LVS	ATL	BRI	TEX	NSH	PHO	TAL	RCH	DAR			NSH; 39	KEN; 14	MLW	DAY	CHI	NHA	MAR; 18	GTY	IRP	GLN; 8	MCH	BRI	CAL	RCH	DOV	KAN	CLT	MEM	TEX	PHO	HOM	58th	663	
2006	Biagi-DenBeste Racing	4	Dodge													CLT; 31	DOV																						58th	663	
2007	Evernham Motorsports	9	Dodge	DAY	CAL	MXC; 3	LVS	ATL	BRI	NSH; 29	TEX	PHO	TAL	RCH	DAR	CLT	DOV	NSH	KEN	MLW	NHA	DAY	CHI	GTY	IRP	CGV; 28	GLN; 12	MCH	BRI	CAL	RCH	DOV	KAN	CLT	MEM	TEX	PHO	HOM	75th	452	
2008	Team Rensi Motorsports	25	Ford	DAY	CAL	LVS	ATL	BRI	NSH	TEX	PHO	MXC; 35	TAL	RCH	DAR	CLT	DOV	NSH	KEN	MLW	NHA	DAY	CHI	GTY	IRP	CGV; 5													78th	295	
2008	Jimmy Means Racing	52	Ford																								GLN; 27	MCH	BRI	CAL	RCH	DOV	KAN	CLT	MEM	TEX	PHO	HOM	78th	295	
2009	RAB Racing	09	Ford	DAY	CAL	LVS	BRI	TEX	NSH	PHO	TAL	RCH	DAR	CLT	DOV	NSH	KEN	MLW	NHA	DAY	CHI	GTY	IRP	IOW	GLN; 11	MCH	BRI	CGV; 25	ATL	RCH	DOV	KAN	CAL	CLT	MEM	TEX	PHO	HOM	92nd	218	
2010	RAB Racing	09	Ford	DAY	CAL	LVS	BRI	NSH	PHO	TEX	TAL	RCH	DAR	DOV	CLT	NSH	KEN	ROA	NHA	DAY	CHI	GTY	IRP	IOW	GLN; 22	MCH	BRI	CGV; 1	ATL	RCH	DOV	KAN	CAL	CLT	GTY	TEX	PHO	HOM	86th	287	
2011	Turner Motorsports	30	Chevy	DAY	PHO	LVS	BRI	CAL	TEX	TAL	NSH	RCH	DAR	DOV	IOW	CLT	CHI	MCH	ROA	DAY	KEN	NHA	NSH	IRP	IOW	GLN	CGV; 37	BRI	ATL	RCH	CHI	DOV	KAN	CLT	TEX	PHO	HOM		135th	0^{1}	
2015	Joe Gibbs Racing	54	Toyota	DAY	ATL	LVS	PHO	CAL	TEX	BRI	RCH	TAL; 16	IOW; 26	CLT	DOV	MCH	CHI	DAY	KEN	NHA	IND	IOW	GLN; 4	MOH; 13	BRI	ROA; 6	DAR	RCH	CHI	KEN	DOV	CLT	KAN	TEX	PHO	HOM			32nd	157	
2021	MBM Motorsports	13	Toyota	DAY	DRC	HOM	LVS	PHO	ATL	MAR	TAL	DAR	DOV	COA; 31	CLT	MOH	TEX	NSH	POC																				68th	6	
2021	MBM Motorsports	61	Toyota																	ROA; DNQ	ATL	NHA	GLN	IRC	MCH	DAY	DAR	RCH	BRI	LVS	TAL	ROV	TEX	KAN	MAR	PHO			68th	6	
2023	Hendrick Motorsports	17	Chevy	DAY	CAL	LVS	PHO	ATL	COA	RCH	MAR	TAL	DOV	DAR	CLT	PIR	SON	NSH	CSC	ATL	NHA	POC	ROA	MCH	IRC	GLN	DAY	DAR	KAN	BRI	TEX	ROV; DNQ	LVS	HOM	MAR	PHO			N/A	0	
2024	Hendrick Motorsports	17	Chevy	DAY	ATL	LVS	PHO	COA	RCH	MAR	TEX	TAL	DOV	DAR	CLT	PIR	SON; 28	IOW	NHA	NSH	CSC	POC	IND	MCH	DAY	DAR	ATL	GLN	BRI	KAN	TAL	ROV	LVS	HOM	MAR	PHO			70th	9	

==== Craftsman Truck Series ====
NASCAR Craftsman Truck Series results
Year	Team	No.	Make	1	2	3	4	5	6	7	8	9	10	11	12	13	14	15	16	17	18	19	20	21	22	23	24	25	26	27	NCTC	Pts	Ref
1995	Irvan-Simo Racing	4	Ford	PHO	TUS	SGS	MMR	POR	EVG	I70	LVL	BRI	MLW	CNS	HPT	IRP	FLM	RCH	MAR	NWS	SON; 25	MMR	PHO								91st	91	
1996	Irvan-Simo Racing	28	Ford	HOM	PHO	POR	EVG	TUS	CNS	HPT	BRI	NZH	MLW	LVL; 16	I70; 13	IRP	FLM	GLN	NSV	RCH	NHA	MAR; 16	NWS	SON	MMR	PHO	LVS				54th	354	
1997	Irvan-Simo Racing	44	Ford	WDW; 26	TUS; 18	HOM; 32	PHO; 24	POR; 26	EVG; 27	I70; 12	NHA; 4	TEX; 2	BRI; 18	NZH; 20	MLW; 11	LVL; 9	CNS; 22	HPT; 22	IRP; 14	FLM; 20	NSV; 27	GLN; 11	RCH; 17	MAR; 26	SON; 20	MMR; 23	CAL; 33	PHO; 20	LVS; 37		16th	2657	
1998	Irvan-Simo Racing	44	Ford	WDW; 11	HOM; 24	PHO; 15	POR; 23	EVG; 26	I70; 29	GLN; 3	TEX; 38	BRI; 20	MLW; 17	NZH; 27	CAL; 8	PPR; 24	IRP; 29	NHA; 18	FLM; 19	NSV; 23	**HPT**; 22	LVL; 23	RCH; 19	MEM; 14	GTY; 21	MAR; 29	SON; 1	MMR; 24	PHO; 7	LVS; 28	21st	2813	
1999	Irvan-Simo Racing	44	Ford	HOM	PHO	EVG	MMR	MAR	MEM	PPR	I70	BRI	TEX	**PIR**; 5	GLN	MLW	NSV; 25	NZH	MCH	NHA	IRP	GTY	**HPT**; 2	RCH; DNQ				CAL; 13			34th	725	
1999	Team Racing	23	Ford																					RCH; 17	LVS	LVL					34th	725	
1999	Gloy/Rahal Racing	55	Ford																								TEX; 34				34th	725	
2000	Spencer Motor Ventures	44	Ford	DAY	HOM	PHO	MMR	MAR	PIR; 15	GTY	MEM	PPR	EVG	TEX	KEN	GLN	MLW	NHA	NZH	MCH	IRP	NSV	CIC	RCH	DOV	TEX	CAL				85th	123	
2005	Circle Bar Racing	14	Ford	DAY	CAL	ATL	MAR	GTY	MFD	CLT	DOV	TEX	MCH	MLW	KAN	KEN; 35	MEM	IRP	NSH	BRI	RCH	NHA	LVS	MAR	ATL	TEX	PHO	HOM			89th	123	

^{1} Ineligible for series points

==== Busch North Series ====
NASCAR Busch North Series results
Year	Team	No.	Make	1	2	3	4	5	6	7	8	9	10	11	12	13	14	15	16	17	18	19	20	21	22	NBNSC	Pts	Ref
1997	A. J. Parker	03	Chevy	DAY	LEE	JEN	NHA	NZH	HOL	NHA; 45	STA	BEE	TMP	NZH	TIO	NHA	STA	THU	GLN	EPP	RPS	BEE	TMP	NHA	LRP	105th	28	
2001	James Lestorti	13	Chevy	LEE	NHA	SEE	HOL	BEE	EPP	STA	WFD	BEE	TMP	NHA	STA	SEE	GLN	NZH	TRO	BEE	DOV	STA	LIM; 2*			58th	170	

==== K&N Pro Series West ====
NASCAR K&N Pro Series West results
Year	Team	No.	Make	1	2	3	4	5	6	7	8	9	10	11	12	13	14	NKNPSWC	Pts	Ref
1998	Info not available	42	Ford	TUS	LVS; 5	PHO	CAL	HPT	MMR	AMP	POR	CAL	PPR	EVG	SON	MMR	LVS	61st	155	
2006	Biagi-DenBeste Racing	57	Ford	PHO	PHO	S99	IRW	SON; 22	DCS	IRW	EVG	S99	CAL	CTS	AMP			72nd	97	
2007	Ken Schrader Racing	52	Chevy	CTS	PHO	AMP	ELK	IOW	CNS	SON; 3	DCS	IRW	MMP	EVG	CSR	AMP		44th	170	
2009	Biagi-DenBeste Racing	57	Ford	CTS	AAS	PHO	MAD	IOW	DCS	SON; 4	IRW	PIR	MMP	CNS	IOW	AAS		48th	160	
2010	Biagi-DenBeste Racing	57	Ford	AAS	PHO	IOW	DCS	SON; 14	IRW	PIR	MRP	CNS	MMP	AAS	PHO			62nd	126	
2011	Biagi-DenBeste Racing	57	Ford	PHO	AAS	MMP	IOW	LVS	SON; 34	IRW	EVG	PIR	CNS	MRP	SPO	AAS	PHO	91st	61	

=== ARCA Re/Max Series ===
(key) (Bold – Pole position awarded by qualifying time. Italics – Pole position earned by points standings or practice time. * – Most laps led.)

ARCA Re/Max Series results
Year	Team	No.	Make	1	2	3	4	5	6	7	8	9	10	11	12	13	14	15	16	17	18	19	20	21	22	ARMC	Pts	Ref
2003	Ken Schrader Racing	99	Pontiac	DAY	ATL	NSH	SLM	TOL	KEN	CLT	BLN	KAN	MCH	LER	POC	POC	NSH	ISF	WIN	DSF	CHI	SLM	TAL; 24	CLT	SBO	158th	110	

=== Supercars results ===
(key) (Races in bold indicate pole position) (Races in italics indicate fastest lap)

Year	Team	Car	1	2	3	4	5	6	7	8	9	10	11	12	13	14	15	16	17	18	19	20	21	22	23	24	25	26	27	28	29	30	31	32	33	34	35	36	37	38	Pos.	Pts
2008	Paul Morris Motorsport	Holden VE Commodore	ADE; R1	ADE; R2	EAS; R3	EAS; R4	EAS; R5	HAM; R6	HAM; R7	HAM; R8	BAR; R29	BAR; R10	BAR; R11	SAN; R12	SAN; R13	SAN; R14	HDV; R15	HDV; R16	HDV; R17	QLD; R18	QLD; R19	QLD; R20	WIN; R21	WIN; R22	WIN; R23	PHI; Q 15	PHI; R24; 19	BAT; R25; Ret	SUR; R26	SUR; R27	SUR; R28	BHR; R29	BHR; R30	BHR; R31	SYM; R32	SYM; R33	SYM; R34	ORA; R35	ORA; R36	ORA; R37	57th	94
2011	Paul Morris Motorsport	Holden VE Commodore	YMC; R1	YMC; R2	ADE; R3	ADE; R4	HAM; R5	HAM; R6	BAR; R7	BAR; R8	BAR; R9	WIN; R10	WIN; R11	HID; R12	HID; R13	TOW; R14	TOW; R15	QLD; R16	QLD; R17	QLD; R18	PHI; Q	PHI; R19	BAT; R20	SUR; R21; 18	SUR; R22; 7	SYM; R23	SYM; R24	SAN; R25	SAN; R26	SYD; R27	SYD; R28										63rd	147
2012	Paul Morris Motorsport	Ford FG Falcon	ADE; R1	ADE; R2	SYM; R3	SYM; R4	HAM; R5	HAM; R6	BAR; R7	BAR; R8	BAR; R9	PHI; R10	PHI; R11	HID; R12	HID; R13	TOW; R14	TOW; R15	QLD; R16	QLD; R17	SMP; R18	SMP; R19	SAN; Q	SAN; R20	BAT; R21	SUR; R22; Ret	SUR; R23; 18	YMC; R24	YMC; R25	YMC; R26	WIN; R27	WIN; R28	SYD; R29	SYD; R30								NC	0^{1}

^{1} Ineligible for championship points

=== WeatherTech SportsCar Championship results ===
(key)(Races in bold indicate pole position, Results are overall/class)

Year	Team	Class	Make	Engine	1	2	3	4	5	6	7	8	9	10	11	Rank	Points
2014	Marsh Racing	P	Coyote Corvette DP	Chevrolet 5.5L V8	DAY; 10	SIR; 12	LBH; 10	LGA; 6	DET; 10	WGL; 6	MSP; DNS	IMS	ELK	COA; 8	PET; 5	16th	168

- ^{1} – Relegated to last in class for violation of minimum drive time requirements.
