= 2008 Toyota/Save Mart 350 =

Race details
- Race 16 of 36 in the 2008 NASCAR Sprint Cup Series
- 2008 Toyota/Save Mart 350 program cover
- Date: June 22, 2008
- Official name: Toyota/Save Mart 350
- Location: Infineon Raceway Sonoma, California
- Course: Permanent racing facility
- Course length: 3.2 km (1.99 miles)
- Distance: 112 laps, 222.88 mi (358.69 km)
- Weather: Temperatures reaching up to 89.1 °F (31.7 °C); wind speeds up to 18.1 miles per hour (29.1 km/h)
- Average speed: 76.445 miles per hour (123.026 km/h)

Pole position
Driver	Kasey Kahne	Richard Petty Motorsports
- Time: 1:17.40

Most laps led
Driver	Kyle Busch	Joe Gibbs Racing
- Laps: 78

Winner
No. 18	Kyle Busch	Joe Gibbs Racing

Television in the United States
- Network: Turner Network Television
- Announcers: Bill Weber, Wally Dallenbach Jr. and Kyle Petty

The 2008 Toyota/Save Mart 350 was the sixteenth race of the 2008 NASCAR Sprint Cup season, and the first of two scheduled road course races on the 2008 schedule. The event was held on Sunday, June 22, 2008, at Infineon Raceway at Sears Point in Sonoma, California, televised on TNT starting at 3:30 PM US EDT, and broadcast on radio via Sirius Satellite Radio and Performance Racing Network starting at 4 PM US EDT.

== Pre-Race News ==
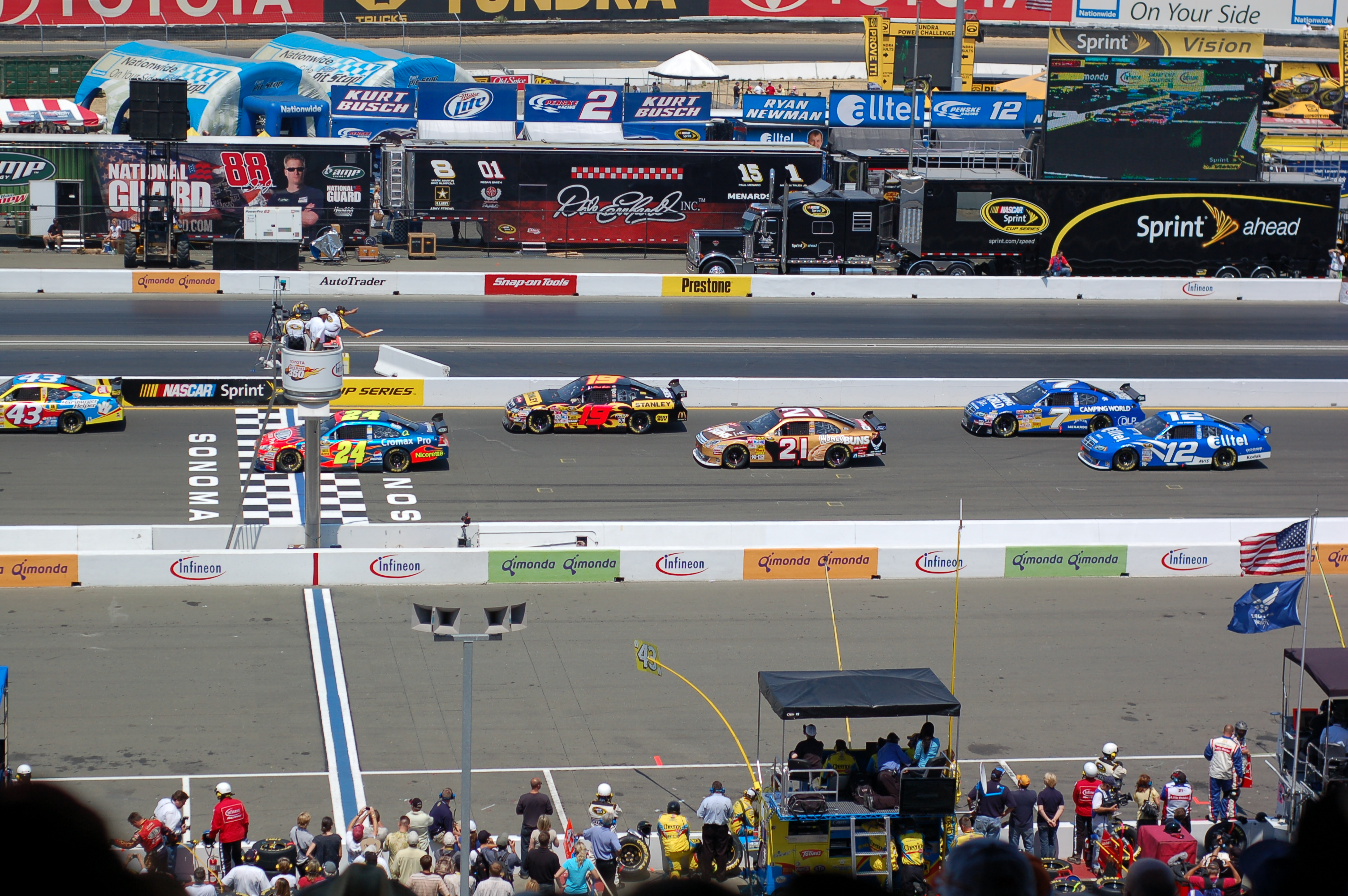
The drivers on the parade lap

- It was announced by Joe Gibbs Racing that 18-year-old Joey Logano, who won the Nationwide Series Meijer 300 at Kentucky Motor Speedway one week earlier will attempt to drive in several late-season Sprint Cup races. At 18 years, 21 days of age, Logano became the youngest NASCAR-sanctioned major series race winner surpassing Casey Atwood's age of 18 years, 313 days.
- The biannual rite of road course ringers replacing regular drivers happened as per custom this week at Infineon Raceway. Among this week's changes among those already locked into the Top 35, Scott Pruett replaced Reed Sorenson in the #41 Chip Ganassi Racing Dodge starting 28th and Dale Earnhardt, Inc. employed Canadian Ron Fellows in the #01 Chevrolet for Regan Smith, starting 22nd. Four drivers - Italian Max Papis, who drove the #66 Haas CNC Racing Chevrolet in the 28th slot for Scott Riggs, who transferred to the #70 ride this week, and failed to make the race; Brian Simo drove Front Row Motorsports' #34 car, which switched from Chevrolet to Ford for No Fear Racing, and started 43rd ("Shotgun on the field"); Aussie Marcos Ambrose in the #21 Wood Brothers Ford, who started seventh and Boris Said in the No Fear Racing #60 Ford who will started 14th - made the race in the knockout phase of the qualifying.
- Kyle Busch will solely concentrate on trying to win the 2008 Sprint Cup championship, abandoning racing separate events in the Nationwide Series and the Craftsman Truck Series unless they are in conjunction with Sprint Cup events.

=== Race notes ===
The Australian rookie Marcos Ambrose had his first NASCAR Cup race/start in this race. He started 7th and the NASCAR Cup world noticed him. When Marcos Ambrose came to Sonoma to race, the fans and drivers remembered him for him being crashed by Robby Gordon in 2007 at Montreal with 2 laps left. Marcos Ambrose because of his road course talent & good finishes in the Busch series in his past, qualified seventh; and was contending to win in his Wood Bros. #21 Chevy. However, with 25 laps left, NASCAR veteran Elliott Sadler tapped Marcos Ambrose who crashed and was damaged enough that he could not race anymore that day. Marcos Ambrose was really unhappy about the end of his good run and in post-race ceremonies he argued with Elliott Sadler in the garages. Ambrose said to reporters that he felt like beating Elliott Sadler for the tap but he got over it the next week after a call/apology from Sadler. Marcos finished in 42nd spot as a heartbreak for his first NASCAR Cup run.

Italian driver Max Papis also had one of his first NASCAR Cup races at Sonoma. He drove for Gene Haas' (Now Stewart-Haas) #66 Automation chevy and ended up in 35th spot.

The 2008 Toyota/Save Mart 350 also had one of NASCAR's largest numbers of road course drivers competing in the races with 8 drivers (Ron Fellows, Marcos Ambrose, Patrick Carpentier, Boris Said, Scott Pruett, Sam Hornish, Brian Simo, Robby Gordon).

== Qualifying ==
Kasey Kahne, who went out third in qualifying won the session, his second this season. Kahne, driver of the #9 Gillett Evernham Motorsports Budweiser Dodge had bettered Dale Earnhardt Jr.'s time, and then sweated out 44 other attempts to sit on P-1. Jimmie Johnson started next to Kahne on the front row, with Kurt Busch and Bobby Labonte in the second row, followed by Jeff Gordon and Elliott Sadler in the third row.

RANK	DRIVER	NBR	CAR	TIME	SPEED	
1	Kasey Kahne	9	Dodge	1:17.740	92.153	
2	Jimmie Johnson	48	Chevrolet	1:17.836	92.040	
3	Kurt Busch	2	Dodge	1:17.865	92.005	
4	Bobby Labonte	43	Dodge	1:17.918	91.943	
5	Jeff Gordon	24	Chevrolet	1:17.935	91.923	
6	Elliott Sadler	19	Dodge	1:18.003	91.843	
7	Marcos Ambrose	21	Ford	1:18.023	91.819	*
8	Robby Gordon	7	Dodge	1:18.097	91.732	
9	Ryan Newman	12	Dodge	1:18.279	91.519	
10	Greg Biffle	16	Ford	1:18.340	91.448	
11	Terry Labonte	45	Dodge	1:18.340	91.448	*
12	Carl Edwards	99	Ford	1:18.487	91.276	
13	Denny Hamlin	11	Toyota	1:18.547	91.207	
14	Boris Said	60	Ford	1:18.568	91.182	*
15	Dale Earnhardt Jr.	88	Chevrolet	1:18.585	91.162	
16	Dave Blaney	22	Toyota	1:18.589	91.158	
17	Sam Hornish Jr.	77	Dodge	1:18.598	91.147	
18	Jamie McMurray	26	Ford	1:18.604	91.140	
19	Clint Bowyer	07	Chevrolet	1:18.606	91.138	
20	Jeff Burton	31	Chevrolet	1:18.676	91.057	
21	Juan Pablo Montoya	42	Dodge	1:18.704	91.025	
22	Ron Fellows	01	Chevrolet	1:18.715	91.012	
23	Casey Mears	5	Chevrolet	1:18.739	90.984	
24	Joe Nemechek	78	Chevrolet	1:18.764	90.955	*
25	Martin Truex Jr.	1	Chevrolet	1:18.768	90.951	
26	Brian Vickers	83	Toyota	1:18.784	90.932	
27	Scott Pruett	41	Dodge	1:18.808	90.904	
28	Max Papis	66	Chevrolet	1:18.838	90.870	*
29	Paul Menard	15	Chevrolet	1:18.895	90.804	
30	Kyle Busch	18	Toyota	1:18.904	90.794	
31	David Gilliland	38	Ford	1:18.906	90.792	
32	Kevin Harvick	29	Chevrolet	1:18.922	90.773	
33	Matt Kenseth	17	Ford	1:18.931	90.763	
34	Michael McDowell	00	Toyota	1:18.991	90.694	
35	Michael Waltrip	55	Toyota	1:19.032	90.647	
36	A.J. Allmendinger	84	Toyota	1:19.152	90.509	*
37	Patrick Carpentier	10	Dodge	1:19.270	90.375	*
38	David Ragan	6	Ford	1:19.286	90.356	
39	Tony Stewart	20	Toyota	1:19.337	90.298	
40	Aric Almirola	8	Chevrolet	1:19.399	90.228	
41	Brian Simo	34	Ford	1:19.481	90.135	*
42	J. J. Yeley	96	Toyota	1:19.535	90.074	*
43	Travis Kvapil	28	Ford	1:19.688	89.901	OP
44	Scott Riggs	70	Chevrolet	1:19.740	89.842	*
45	Dario Franchitti	40	Dodge	1:19.822	89.750	*
46	David Reutimann	44	Toyota	1:20.660	88.817	OP
47	Brandon Ash	02	Dodge	1:21.295	88.124	*

OP: qualified via owners points

PC: qualified as past champion

PR: provisional

QR: via qualifying race

* - had to qualify on time

Failed to Qualify: J. J. Yeley (#96), Scott Riggs (#70), Dario Franchitti (#40), Brandon Ash (#02)

== Race recap ==
Kyle Busch came from the 30th starting position to win the race under a green-white-checker finish, the second furthest back in this race to win, bettering Juan Pablo Montoya's position one year earlier.

== Results ==
POS	ST	#	DRIVER	SPONSOR / OWNER	CAR	LAPS	MONEY	STATUS	LED	PTS
1	30	18	Kyle Busch	M&M's (Joe Gibbs)	Toyota	112	309925	running	78	195
2	31	38	David Gilliland	FreeCreditReport.com (Yates Racing)	Ford	112	207658	running	0	170
3	5	24	Jeff Gordon	DuPont Cromax Pro (Rick Hendrick)	Chevrolet	112	191736	running	0	165
4	19	07	Clint Bowyer	Jack Daniel's (Richard Childress)	Chevrolet	112	143725	running	0	160
5	23	5	Casey Mears	Kellogg's / Carquest (Rick Hendrick)	Chevrolet	112	123075	running	0	155
6	21	42	Juan Pablo Montoya	Texaco / Havoline (Chip Ganassi)	Dodge	112	130533	running	0	150
7	9	12	Ryan Newman	Alltel (Roger Penske)	Dodge	112	140025	running	0	146
8	33	17	Matt Kenseth	DeWalt (Jack Roush)	Ford	112	142841	running	0	142
9	12	99	Carl Edwards	Office Depot (Jack Roush)	Ford	112	134725	running	2	143
10	39	20	Tony Stewart	Home Depot (Joe Gibbs)	Toyota	112	136261	running	0	134
11	10	16	Greg Biffle	3M (Jack Roush)	Ford	112	95600	running	1	135
12	15	88	Dale Earnhardt Jr.	National Guard / AMP Energy (Rick Hendrick)	Chevrolet	112	94050	running	0	127
13	20	31	Jeff Burton	AT&T Mobility (Richard Childress)	Chevrolet	112	128508	running	0	124
14	26	83	Brian Vickers	Red Bull (Dietrich Mateschitz)	Toyota	112	84200	running	0	121
15	2	48	Jimmie Johnson	Lowe's (Rick Hendrick)	Chevrolet	112	135336	running	27	123
16	25	1	Martin Truex Jr.	Bass Pro Shops / Tracker Boats (Dale Earnhardt, Inc.)	Chevrolet	112	113433	running	0	115
17	11	45	Terry Labonte	Wells Fargo (Petty Enterprises)	Dodge	112	97883	running	0	112
18	18	26	Jamie McMurray	Crown Royal (Jack Roush)	Ford	112	89375	running	0	109
19	6	19	Elliott Sadler	Stanley Tools (Gillett Evernham Motorsports)	Dodge	112	106695	running	0	106
20	16	22	Dave Blaney	Caterpillar (Bill Davis)	Toyota	112	96233	running	0	103
21	34	00	Michael McDowell	NAPA Auto Parts (Michael Waltrip)	Toyota	112	92233	running	0	100
22	41	28	Travis Kvapil	California Highway Patrol (Yates Racing)	Ford	112	105639	running	0	97
23	37	10	Patrick Carpentier	Valvoline (Gillett Evernham Motorsports)	Dodge	112	75350	running	0	94
24	38	6	David Ragan	AAA Insurance (Jack Roush)	Ford	112	85250	running	0	91
25	35	55	Michael Waltrip	NAPA Auto Parts (Michael Waltrip)	Toyota	112	86672	running	0	88
26	24	78	Joe Nemechek	Furniture Row / DenverMattress.com (Barney Visser)	Chevrolet	112	72800	running	0	85
27	13	11	Denny Hamlin	FedEx Office (Joe Gibbs)	Toyota	112	110441	running	0	82
28	40	8	Aric Almirola	U.S. Army (Dale Earnhardt, Inc.)	Chevrolet	112	108933	running	0	79
29	22	01	Ron Fellows	Principal Financial Group (Dale Earnhardt, Inc.)	Chevrolet	112	82550	running	0	76
30	32	29	Kevin Harvick	Shell / Pennzoil (Richard Childress)	Chevrolet	112	118661	running	0	73
31	17	77	Sam Hornish Jr.	Mobil 1 (Roger Penske)	Dodge	112	116825	running	0	70
32	3	2	Kurt Busch	Miller Lite (Roger Penske)	Dodge	111	74605	running	0	67
33	1	9	Kasey Kahne	Budweiser (Gillett Evernham Motorsports)	Dodge	111	110936	running	4	69
34	29	15	Paul Menard	Menards / Johns Manville (Dale Earnhardt, Inc.)	Chevrolet	111	78880	running	0	61
35	28	66	Max Papis	Haas Automation (Gene Haas)	Chevrolet	111	70745	running	0	58
36	8	7	Robby Gordon	Camping World / RVs.com / DLP HDTV (Robby Gordon)	Dodge	110	78635	running	0	55
37	36	84	A.J. Allmendinger	Red Bull (Dietrich Mateschitz)	Toyota	109	70500	running	0	52
38	27	41	Scott Pruett	Target (Chip Ganassi)	Dodge	108	97599	crash	0	49
39	4	43	Bobby Labonte	Cheerios / Betty Crocker (Petty Enterprises)	Dodge	103	107511	electrical	0	46
40	42	44	David Reutimann	UPS (Michael Waltrip)	Toyota	99	70125	crash	0	43
41	14	60	Boris Said	7-Eleven Slurpee / No Fear (Mark Simo)	Ford	94	70000	shocks	0	40
42	7	21	Marcos Ambrose	Little Debbie Honey Buns (Wood Brothers)	Ford	83	88250	transmission	0	37
43	43	34	Brian Simo	No Fear (Bob Jenkins)	Ford	20	70164	transmission	0	34
Failed to qualify, withdrew, or driver changes:
POS	NAME	NBR	SPONSOR	OWNER	CAR					
44	J. J. Yeley	96	DLP HDTV	Jeff Moorad	Toyota					
45	Scott Riggs	70	Haas Automation	Gene Haas	Chevrolet					
46	Dario Franchitti	40	Texaco / Havoline - The Hartford	Chip Ganassi	Dodge					
47	Brandon Ash	02	Sprinter Trucking / Sunny D Manufacturing	Kenneth Wood	Dodge					

NOTE: Race extended two laps due to green-white checker finish.

Previous race: 2008 LifeLock 400	Sprint Cup Series; 2008 season	Next race: 2008 Lenox Industrial Tools 301
