= 2007 Aaron's 499 =

Race details
- Race 9 of 36 in the 2007 NASCAR Nextel Cup Series season
- 2007 Aaron's 499 program cover
- Date: April 29, 2007
- Official name: Aaron's 499
- Location: Talladega Superspeedway, Talladega, Alabama
- Course: Permanent racing facility
- Course length: 2.66 miles (4.28 km)
- Distance: 192 laps, 510.72 mi (821.924 km)
- Scheduled distance: 188 laps, 500.08 mi (804.8 km)
- Weather: Temperatures reaching up to 82 °F (28 °C); average wind speeds of 8.9 miles per hour (14.3 km/h)
- Average speed: 154.167 miles per hour (248.108 km/h)

Pole position
Driver	Jeff Gordon	Hendrick Motorsports
- Time: 49.857

Most laps led
Driver	Jeff Gordon	Hendrick Motorsports
- Laps: 71

Winner
No. 24	Jeff Gordon	Hendrick Motorsports

Television in the United States
- Network: Fox Broadcasting Company
- Announcers: Mike Joy, Darrell Waltrip and Larry McReynolds

The 2007 Aaron's 499 was the ninth race of the 2007 NASCAR Nextel Cup Season, and was run on April 29, 2007, at Talladega Superspeedway in Talladega, Alabama. This race was the second of the four restrictor plate races on the NASCAR schedule.

Jeff Gordon won this race to pass Dale Earnhardt on the all-time NASCAR list at 77 wins. After he crossed the checkered flag, some spectators threw bottles, cans, and even toilet paper at the #24 car he drove for Hendrick Motorsports. As a result of this incident, in spite of warnings before the race by NASCAR and organizers, a total of 14 people were arrested, and Talladega management revoked their ticket-buying privileges. However, a loophole was later discovered through which these banned fans could buy tickets from third-party ticket brokers, such as StubHub. The race's other top finishers included Jimmie Johnson, Kurt Busch, David Gilliland, and Jamie McMurray in that order.

The race ended with an aborted green-white-checkered finish. Several cars were involved, including Tony Stewart, Kevin Harvick, McMurray, and Gilliland. Harvick and McMurray were later fined $25,000 and placed on probation for their actions during this accident. The finish had been triggered by an engine failure in the #00 car driven by David Reutimann.

== Entry list ==
Car #	Driver	Make	Owner/Team
00	David Reutimann (R)	Toyota	Michael Waltrip
01	Regan Smith	Chevrolet	Bobby Ginn
1	Martin Truex Jr	Chevrolet	Dale Earnhardt, Inc.
2	Kurt Busch	Dodge	Roger Penske
4	Ward Burton	Chevrolet	Larry McClure
5	Kyle Busch	Chevrolet	Rick Hendrick
6	David Ragan (R)	Ford	Jack Roush
07	Clint Bowyer	Chevrolet	Richard Childress
7	Robby Gordon	Ford	Robby Gordon
8	Dale Earnhardt Jr	Chevrolet	Dale Earnhardt, Inc.
9	Kasey Kahne	Dodge	Ray Evernham
09	Mike Wallace	Chevrolet	James Finch
10	Scott Riggs	Dodge	James Rocco
11	Denny Hamlin	Chevrolet	Joe Gibbs
12	Ryan Newman	Dodge	Roger Penske
13	Joe Nemechek	Chevrolet	Bobby Ginn
14	Sterling Marlin	Chevrolet	Bobby Ginn
15	Paul Menard (R)	Chevrolet	Dale Earnhardt, Inc.
16	Greg Biffle	Ford	Jack Roush
17	Matt Kenseth	Ford	Jack Roush
18	J.J. Yeley	Chevrolet	Joe Gibbs
19	Elliott Sadler	Dodge	Ray Evernham
20	Tony Stewart	Chevrolet	Joe Gibbs
21	Ken Schrader	Ford	Wood Brothers
22	Dave Blaney	Toyota	Bill Davis
24	Jeff Gordon	Chevrolet	Rick Hendrick
25	Casey Mears	Chevrolet	Rick Hendrick
26	Jamie McMurray	Ford	Jack Roush
29	Kevin Harvick	Chevrolet	Richard Childress
31	Jeff Burton	Chevrolet	Richard Childress
34	Kevin Lepage	Dodge	Bob Jenkins
36	Jeremy Mayfield	Toyota	Bill Davis
37	John Andretti	Dodge	Bob Jenkins
38	David Gilliland (R)	Ford	Yates Racing
40	David Stremme	Dodge	Chip Ganassi
41	Reed Sorenson	Dodge	Chip Ganassi
42	Juan Pablo Montoya (R)	Dodge	Chip Ganassi
43	Bobby Labonte	Dodge	Petty Enterprises
44	Dale Jarrett	Toyota	Michael Waltrip
45	Kyle Petty	Dodge	Petty Enterprises
48	Jimmie Johnson	Chevrolet	Rick Hendrick
49	Mike Bliss	Dodge	Beth Ann Morgenthau
55	Michael Waltrip	Toyota	Michael Waltrip
60	Boris Said	Ford	Mark Simo
66	Jeff Green	Chevrolet	Gene Haas
70	Johnny Sauter	Chevrolet	Gene Haas
78	Kenny Wallace	Chevrolet	Barney Visser
83	Brian Vickers	Toyota	Dietrich Mateschitz
84	AJ Allmendinger (R)	Toyota	Dietrich Mateschitz
88	Ricky Rudd	Ford	Yates Racing
96	Tony Raines	Chevrolet	Bill Saunders
99	Carl Edwards	Ford	Jack Roush

== Qualifying ==
In qualifying, both Jeff Gordon and David Gilliland would tie for having the same time. The pole was given to Jeff Gordon, who had more owners points.

Pos	Car #	Driver	Make	Team	Speed	Time	Behind
1	24	Jeff Gordon	Chevrolet	Hendrick Motorsports	192.069	49.857	0.000
2	38	David Gilliland (R)	Ford	Robert Yates Racing	192.069	49.857	0.000
3	11	Denny Hamlin	Chevrolet	Joe Gibbs Racing	191.551	49.992	-0.135
4	14	Sterling Marlin	Chevrolet	Ginn Racing	191.023	50.130	-0.273
5	88	Ricky Rudd	Ford	Robert Yates Racing	190.924	50.156	-0.299
6	78	Kenny Wallace	Chevrolet	Furniture Row Racing	190.909	50.160	-0.303
7	25	Casey Mears	Chevrolet	Hendrick Motorsports	190.787	50.192	-0.335
8	48	Jimmie Johnson	Chevrolet	Hendrick Motorsports	190.757	50.200	-0.343
9	10	Scott Riggs	Dodge	Evernham Motorsports	190.465	50.277	-0.420
10	6	David Ragan (R)	Ford	Roush Racing	190.393	50.296	-0.439
11	60	Boris Said	Ford	No Fear Racing	190.393	50.296	-0.439
12	16	Greg Biffle	Ford	Roush Racing	190.306	50.319	-0.462
13	5	Kyle Busch	Chevrolet	Hendrick Motorsports	190.234	50.338	-0.481
14	00	David Reutimann (R)	Toyota	Michael Waltrip Racing	190.204	50.346	-0.489
15	4	Ward Burton	Chevrolet	Morgan McClure Motorsport	190.177	50.353	-0.496
16	99	Carl Edwards	Ford	Roush Racing	190.162	50.357	-0.500
17	17	Matt Kenseth	Ford	Roush Racing	190.151	50.360	-0.503
18	36	Jeremy Mayfield	Toyota	Bill Davis Racing	190.098	50.374	-0.517
19	15	Paul Menard (R)	Chevrolet	Dale Earnhardt Inc.	190.079	50.379	-0.522
20	40	David Stremme	Dodge	Chip Ganassi Racing	189.974	50.407	-0.550
21	70	Johnny Sauter	Chevrolet	Haas CNC Racing	189.940	50.416	-0.559
22	01	Regan Smith	Chevrolet	Dale Earnhardt Inc.	189.785	50.457	-0.600
23	45	Kyle Petty	Dodge	Petty Enterprises	189.714	50.476	-0.619
24	42	Juan Pablo Montoya (R)	Dodge	Chip Ganassi Racing	189.665	50.489	-0.632
25	26	Jamie McMurray	Ford	Roush Racing	189.639	50.496	-0.639
26	2	Kurt Busch	Dodge	Penske Racing	189.635	50.497	-0.640
27	96	Tony Raines	Chevrolet	Hall of Fame Racing	189.598	50.507	-0.650
28	12	Ryan Newman	Dodge	Penske Racing	189.429	50.552	-0.695
29	41	Reed Sorenson	Dodge	Chip Ganassi Racing	189.223	50.607	-0.750
30	9	Kasey Kahne	Dodge	Evernham Motorsports	188.935	50.684	-0.827
31	18	JJ Yeley	Chevrolet	Joe Gibbs Racing	188.872	50.701	-0.844
32	20	Tony Stewart	Chevrolet	Joe Gibbs Racing	188.675	50.754	-0.897
33	13	Joe Nemechek	Chevrolet	Ginn Racing	188.493	50.803	-0.946
34	66	Jeff Green	Chevrolet	Haas CNC Racing	188.448	50.815	-0.958
35	43	Bobby Labonte	Dodge	Petty Enterprises	188.422	50.822	-0.965
36	8	Dale Earnhardt Jr	Chevrolet	Dale Earnhardt Inc.	188.389	50.831	-0.974
37	1	Martin Truex Jr	Chevrolet	Dale Earnhardt Inc.	188.370	50.836	-0.979
38	7	Robby Gordon	Ford	Robby Gordon Motorsport	188.304	50.854	-0.997
39	19	Elliott Sadler	Dodge	Evernham Motorsports	187.313	51.123	-1.266
40	07	Clint Bowyer	Chevrolet	Richard Childress Racing	187.101	51.181	-1.324
41	29	Kevin Harvick	Chevrolet	Richard Childress Racing	186.882	51.241	-1.384
42	31	Jeff Burton	Chevrolet	Richard Childress Racing	186.579	51.324	-1.467
43	44	Dale Jarrett	Toyota	Michael Waltrip Racing		51.581	
Failed to qualify
44	55	Michael Waltrip	Toyota	Michael Waltrip Racing		50.388	
45	83	Brian Vickers	Toyota	Red Bull Racing		50.406	
46	22	Dave Blaney	Toyota	Bill Davis Racing		50.526	
47	84	A.J. Allmendinger (R)	Toyota	Red Bull Racing		50.527	
48	21	Ken Schrader	Ford	Wood Brothers Racing		50.636	
49	09	Mike Wallace	Chevrolet	Phoenix Racing		50.667	
50	34	Kevin Lepage	Dodge	Front Row Motorsports		50.834	
51	37	John Andretti	Dodge	Front Row Motorsports		50.860	
52	49	Mike Bliss	Dodge	BAM Racing		50.942	

== Race results ==
W (*) denotes Rookie of the Year candidate.

Fin	St	#	Driver	Make	Laps	Led	Status	Pts	Winnings
1	1	24	Jeff Gordon	Chevy	192	71	running	195	$355,511
2	8	48	Jimmie Johnson	Chevy	192	12	running	175	$251,736
3	26	2	Kurt Busch	Dodge	192	7	running	170	$212,483
4	2	38	David Gilliland (R)	Ford	192	0	running	160	$182,689
5	25	26	Jamie McMurray	Ford	192	2	running	160	$134,675
6	41	29	Kevin Harvick	Chevy	192	0	running	150	$164,536
7	36	8	Dale Earnhardt Jr.	Chevy	192	2	running	151	$149,233
8	20	40	David Stremme	Dodge	192	1	running	147	$106,025
9	28	12	Ryan Newman	Dodge	192	0	running	138	$133,450
10	37	1	Martin Truex Jr.	Chevy	192	0	running	134	$126,495
11	9	10	Scott Riggs	Dodge	192	0	running	130	$107,050
12	30	9	Kasey Kahne	Dodge	192	5	running	132	$138,891
13	34	66	Jeff Green	Chevy	192	3	running	129	$120,933
14	17	17	Matt Kenseth	Ford	192	3	running	126	$137,641
15	39	19	Elliott Sadler	Dodge	192	1	running	123	$110,770
16	4	14	Sterling Marlin	Chevy	192	16	running	120	$107,983
17	10	6	David Ragan (R)	Ford	192	2	running	117	$127,100
18	23	45	Kyle Petty	Dodge	192	0	running	109	$103,083
19	31	18	J.J. Yeley	Chevy	192	0	running	106	$116,033
20	35	43	Bobby Labonte	Dodge	192	0	running	103	$127,111
21	3	11	Denny Hamlin	Chevy	192	48	running	105	$102,550
22	27	96	Tony Raines	Chevy	192	0	running	97	$96,425
23	18	36	Jeremy Mayfield	Toyota	192	0	running	94	$83,075
24	22	01	Regan Smith	Chevy	192	1	running	96	$104,258
25	29	41	Reed Sorenson	Dodge	192	0	running	88	$101,947
26	6	78	Kenny Wallace	Chevy	192	2	running	90	$83,325
27	11	60	Boris Said	Ford	191	1	running	87	$80,775
28	32	20	Tony Stewart	Chevy	190	7	crash	84	$127,761
29	12	16	Greg Biffle	Ford	190	1	crash	81	$97,025
30	21	70	Johnny Sauter	Chevy	190	0	crash	73	$79,325
31	24	42	Juan Pablo Montoya (R)	Dodge	187	0	running	70	$115,750
32	14	00	David Reutimann (R)	Toyota	184	0	engine	67	$78,525
33	5	88	Ricky Rudd	Ford	155	0	running	64	$110,458
34	42	31	Jeff Burton	Chevy	151	2	running	66	$118,266
35	40	07	Clint Bowyer	Chevy	147	0	running	58	$86,125
36	15	4	Ward Burton	Chevy	144	0	engine	55	$78,725
37	13	5	Kyle Busch	Chevy	130	0	crash	52	$95,800
38	33	13	Joe Nemechek	Chevy	130	0	crash	49	$77,450
39	7	25	Casey Mears	Chevy	124	5	crash	51	$85,250
40	43	44	Dale Jarrett	Toyota	38	0	engine	43	$77,000
41	38	7	Robby Gordon	Ford	33	0	engine	40	$76,800
42	16	99	Carl Edwards	Ford	27	0	engine	37	$84,630
43	19	15	Paul Menard (R)	Chevy	22	0	engine	34	$76,737

== Notes ==
- As mentioned, this was Gordon's 77th career win, which earned him sixth place all-time. The day before, he won his 60th career pole position, which surpassed Darrell Waltrip for the most in NASCAR's modern era (since 1971).
- Gordon won on the anniversary of Dale Earnhardt's birthday and on a track on which he and his son Dale Earnhardt Jr. have won a combined total of 15 Sprint Cup Series races.
- Despite posting the 20th-best overall lap, Michael Waltrip missed his eighth straight Cup race. That lap was only the eighth-fastest among those drivers having to qualify on time. That would have been good enough to make the race, but Dale Jarrett, ironically a teammate at Michael Waltrip Racing, used a past champion's provisional, bumping Waltrip from the field.
- Also missing from the field was Brian Vickers, who had been the most recent race winner at Talladega prior to this, at the 2006 UAW-Ford 500.
- The #21 team owned by Wood Brothers/JTG Racing was absent from a Cup starting lineup for the first time since April 2000, also at Talladega. Ken Schrader, Mark Martin, and Michael Waltrip had been the only three drivers to qualify for all restrictor-plate races since NASCAR first placed them on cars at certain tracks in 1987. All those streaks ended that weekend (Martin was replaced in the #01 by Regan Smith).
- Bill Davis Racing had a mixed weekend; Jeremy Mayfield made his first race outside of those using the Car of Tomorrow, but Dave Blaney missed his first race of the year.

Previous race: 2007 Subway Fresh Fit 500	Nextel Cup Series; 2007 season	Next race: 2007 Crown Royal Presents The Jim Stewart 400
