= Mark Simo =

American racing driver

- Born: October 1, 1959 (age 67); Carlsbad, California, U.S.

NASCAR FedEx Freight Truck Series career
- 2 races run over 2 years
- Best finish: 75th (1995)
- First race: 1995 Heartland Tailgate 175 (Topeka)
- Last race: 1998 Parts America 150 (Watkins Glen)
Wins	Top tens	Poles
0	1	0

Mark "Simo" Simonaitis (born October 1, 1959) is an American race car driver and entrepreneur. He is the twin brother of racer Brian Simo. Currently, he is the CEO of No Fear, and a co-owner of No Fear Racing.

Simo has made two NASCAR Craftsman Truck Series races, first in his self-owned No. 94 Mac Tools Ford F-150, and later in the No. 28 Federated Auto Parts Ford for Ernie Irvan. His best finish was sixth. Simo fielded the No. 44 entry full-time as an owner from 1995 to 1998. Joe Ruttman drove the truck in its first season with sponsorship from Coca-Cola, Mac, and 1-800 COLLECT, winning twice. Bryan Reffner drove the next season and won Rookie of the Year, before Boris Said became the team's new driver with Federated sponsoring. In two years, Said won one race at Sears Point. Following the 1998 season, Simo fielded the No. 14 car part-time in the Winston Cup Series for Said and Randy LaJoie, and the Busch Series for Irvan. He and Irvan planned to field a full-time Winston Cup entry in 2000, but were unable to find sponsorship and leased their equipment to Robby Gordon.

== Motorsports career results ==
=== SCCA National Championship Runoffs ===
Year	Track	Car	Engine	Class	Finish	Start	Status
1990	Road Atlanta	Chevrolet Camaro	Chevrolet	Showroom Stock GT	3	2	Running
1991	Road Atlanta	Chevrolet Camaro	Chevrolet	Showroom Stock GT	6	7	Running

=== NASCAR ===
(key) (Bold – Pole position awarded by qualifying time. Italics – Pole position earned by points standings or practice time. * – Most laps led.)

==== Craftsman Truck Series ====
NASCAR Craftsman Truck Series results
Year	Team	No.	Make	1	2	3	4	5	6	7	8	9	10	11	12	13	14	15	16	17	18	19	20	21	22	23	24	25	26	27	NCWTC	Pts	Ref
1995	Mark Simo	94	Ford	PHO	TUS	SGS	MMR	POR	EVG	I70	LVL	BRI	MLW	CNS	HPT; 14	IRP	FLM	RCH	MAR	NWS	SON	MMR	PHO								75th	121	
1998	Irvan-Simo Racing	28	Ford	WDW	HOM	PHO	POR	EVG	I70	GLN; 7	TEX	BRI	MLW	NZH	CAL	PPR	IRP	NHA	FLM	NSV	HPT	LVL	RCH	MEM	GTY	MAR	SON	MMR	PHO	LVS	77th	150	
