= No Fear =

American lifestyle clothing brand

No Fear, Inc.
- Type: Private
- Industry: Apparel/Retail
- Genre: Clothing, lifestyle
- Founded: 1989
- Founder: Mark Simo; Brian Simo and Boris Said with Marty Moates
- Headquarters: Carlsbad, California, United States
- Products: Action Sports Apparel
- Number of employees: 450
- Parent: Frasers Group
- Divisions: No Fear MX 1999
- Website: NoFear.com

No Fear is an American lifestyle clothing brand that was created in 1989 by Mark Simo, Brian Simo and Marty Moates. No Fear Inc. products are sold at various retail stores and company-owned stores. There are also energy drinks under the same brand, in a joint venture with South Beach Beverage Company. The company currently employs about 450 people. On February 25, 2011, chapter 11 bankruptcy was filed for the company. The UK-based sports retailer Frasers Group —then known as Sports Direct International— bought No Fear in August 2011.

== Clothing ==
No Fear T-shirts and wallets were very popular from the early 1990s to early 2000s. Boxer Manny Pacquiao wore No Fear clothing during training and for his matches. Shirts typically featured existential slogans or quotes that touted the virtues of extreme sports. Common themes that flagrantly touted absolute intolerance of included death anxiety, laziness inclination, conforming to social norms, and the adherence to the law.

== No Fear energy drink ==
Distribution of a No Fear energy drink was through partnership with SoBe. Flavors and versions currently consist of:

- Original (grapefruit)
- Sugar-free
- Motherload (berry)
- Bloodshot (orange/dragonfruit)

No Fear was the official energy drink of the World Extreme Cagefighting, and sponsored fighter Urijah Faber. The Advertiser BLITZKRIEG from Australia 1999, Racer X Illustrated Jeremy McGrath SportingGoods king of supercross.

=== Promotion ===
No Fear began a promotion in 2009 to earn No Fear "cred" by entering codes found under the tab of the cans. Participants could use points earned to acquire No Fear gear. Grand prizes include admission to:

- Mixed martial arts event
- Motocross events
- a surfing trip to Hawaii
- a concert tour with Lamb of God.

On February 12, 2008, World Extreme Cagefighting announced that the No Fear energy drink had entered into a deal with the WEC as the promotion's official presenting sponsor and exclusive energy drink sponsor. The partnership was begun with an event that took place in Albuquerque, New Mexico, the next day.

No Fear had a sponsor for the NASCAR Sprint Cup Series with NASCAR driver Boris Said. It has also sponsored Team Pacquiao on many occasions.

== See also ==
- Mixed martial arts clothing
- No Fear Racing
