= 2007 Pepsi 400 =

Race details
- Race 18 of 36 in the 2007 NASCAR Nextel Cup Series season
- The 2007 Pepsi 400 program cover, featuring Tony Stewart.
- Date: July 7, 2007
- Official name: Pepsi 400
- Location: Daytona International Speedway in Daytona Beach, Florida.
- Course: Permanent racing facility
- Course length: 2.5 miles (4 km)
- Distance: 160 laps, 400 mi (643.737 km)
- Weather: Temperatures reaching up to 93.9 °F (34.4 °C); wind speeds approaching 13.0 miles per hour (20.9 km/h)
- Average speed: 138.983 miles per hour (223.671 km/h)

Pole position
Driver	Jeff Gordon	Hendrick Motorsports
- Time: 2007 Owner's Points

Most laps led
Driver	Clint Bowyer	Richard Childress Racing
- Laps: 55

Winner
No. 26	Jamie McMurray	Roush Fenway Racing

Television in the United States
- Network: Turner Network Television
- Announcers: Bill Weber, Wally Dallenbach Jr. and Kyle Petty

The 2007 Pepsi 400 was the 18th race of the 2007 NASCAR Nextel Cup Series season and held on July 7, 2007, at Daytona International Speedway in Daytona Beach, Florida.

It was the final race at Daytona named the Pepsi 400; beginning in 2008, the race was sponsored by Coca-Cola's Coke Zero brand as the Coke Zero 400.

The layout of Daytona International Speedway, the venue where the race was held.

== Background ==
- (R) denotes rookie driver

Entry list
#	Driver	Team	Make
00	David Reutimann (R)	Michael Waltrip Racing	Toyota
1	Martin Truex Jr.	Dale Earnhardt, Inc.	Chevrolet
01	Mark Martin	Dale Earnhardt, Inc.	Chevrolet
2	Kurt Busch	Penske Racing South	Dodge
4	Ward Burton	Morgan–McClure Motorsports	Chevrolet
04	Eric McClure	Morgan–McClure Motorsports	Chevrolet
5	Kyle Busch	Hendrick Motorsports	Chevrolet
6	David Ragan (R)	Roush Fenway Racing	Ford
7	Robby Gordon	Robby Gordon Motorsports	Ford
07	Clint Bowyer	Richard Childress Racing	Chevrolet
8	Dale Earnhardt Jr.	Dale Earnhardt, Inc.	Chevrolet
9	Kasey Kahne	Evernham Motorsports	Dodge
09	Mike Wallace	Phoenix Racing	Chevrolet
10	Scott Riggs	Evernham Motorsports	Dodge
11	Denny Hamlin	Joe Gibbs Racing	Chevrolet
12	Ryan Newman	Penske Racing South	Dodge
13	Joe Nemechek	Ginn Racing	Chevrolet
14	Sterling Marlin	Ginn Racing	Chevrolet
15	Paul Menard (R)	Dale Earnhardt, Inc.	Chevrolet
16	Greg Biffle	Roush Fenway Racing	Ford
17	Matt Kenseth	Roush Fenway Racing	Ford
18	J.J. Yeley	Joe Gibbs Racing	Chevrolet
19	Elliott Sadler	Evernham Motorsports	Dodge
20	Tony Stewart	Joe Gibbs Racing	Chevrolet
21	Bill Elliott	Wood Brothers Racing	Ford
22	Dave Blaney	Bill Davis Racing	Toyota
24	Jeff Gordon	Hendrick Motorsports	Chevrolet
25	Casey Mears	Hendrick Motorsports	Chevrolet
26	Jamie McMurray	Roush Fenway Racing	Ford
27	Kirk Shelmerdine	Kirk Shelmerdine Racing	Chevrolet
29	Kevin Harvick	Richard Childress Racing	Chevrolet
31	Jeff Burton	Richard Childress Racing	Chevrolet
36	Jeremy Mayfield	Bill Davis Racing	Toyota
37	Kevin Lepage	Front Row Motorsports	Dodge
38	David Gilliland (R)	Robert Yates Racing	Ford
40	David Stremme	Chip Ganassi Racing with Felix Sabates	Dodge
41	Reed Sorenson	Chip Ganassi Racing with Felix Sabates	Dodge
42	Juan Pablo Montoya (R)	Chip Ganassi Racing with Felix Sabates	Dodge
43	Bobby Labonte	Petty Enterprises	Dodge
44	Dale Jarrett	Michael Waltrip Racing	Toyota
45	John Andretti	Petty Enterprises	Dodge
48	Jimmie Johnson	Hendrick Motorsports	Chevrolet
49	Larry Foyt	BAM Racing	Dodge
55	Michael Waltrip	Michael Waltrip Racing	Toyota
60	Boris Said	No Fear Racing	Ford
66	Jeff Green	Haas CNC Racing	Chevrolet
70	Johnny Sauter	Haas CNC Racing	Chevrolet
78	Kenny Wallace	Furniture Row Racing	Chevrolet
83	Brian Vickers	Red Bull Racing Team	Toyota
84	A.J. Allmendinger (R)	Red Bull Racing Team	Toyota
88	Ricky Rudd	Robert Yates Racing	Ford
96	Tony Raines	Hall of Fame Racing	Chevrolet
99	Carl Edwards	Roush Fenway Racing	Ford

== Qualifying ==
Boris Said was on the pole with 14 cars left to qualify until a rainstorm stopped qualifying. Eventually, it was cancelled outright, sending home, among others, Said, Michael Waltrip, and Jeremy Mayfield who had each posted three of the six fastest attempts.

All times that were recorded were eliminated, and the starting lineup was set according to the NASCAR rule book. The pole sitter was Jeff Gordon, and Denny Hamlin sat on the outside. Ironically, this was the reverse of the previous week's finishing running order.

It was the first time in the speedway's history that a qualifying session was not completed, covering a total of 97 races. As a result of what happened, on January 21, 2008, NASCAR changed the rules that put those not in the Top 35 Owners' Points into a separate session in order to make the race, also called "The Boris Said Rule".

=== Starting lineup ===
Pos.	#	Driver	Team	Make
1	24	Jeff Gordon	Hendrick Motorsports	Chevrolet
2	11	Denny Hamlin	Joe Gibbs Racing	Chevrolet
3	17	Matt Kenseth	Roush Fenway Racing	Ford
4	48	Jimmie Johnson	Hendrick Motorsports	Chevrolet
5	31	Jeff Burton	Richard Childress Racing	Chevrolet
6	20	Tony Stewart	Joe Gibbs Racing	Chevrolet
7	99	Carl Edwards	Roush Fenway Racing	Ford
8	29	Kevin Harvick	Richard Childress Racing	Chevrolet
9	01	Mark Martin	Dale Earnhardt, Inc.	Chevrolet
10	1	Martin Truex Jr.	Dale Earnhardt, Inc.	Chevrolet
11	5	Kyle Busch	Hendrick Motorsports	Chevrolet
12	07	Clint Bowyer	Richard Childress Racing	Chevrolet
13	8	Dale Earnhardt Jr.	Dale Earnhardt, Inc.	Chevrolet
14	12	Ryan Newman	Penske Racing South	Dodge
15	26	Jamie McMurray	Roush Fenway Racing	Ford
16	2	Kurt Busch	Penske Racing South	Dodge
17	18	J.J. Yeley	Joe Gibbs Racing	Chevrolet
18	16	Greg Biffle	Roush Fenway Racing	Ford
19	43	Bobby Labonte	Petty Enterprises	Dodge
20	42	Juan Pablo Montoya (R)	Chip Ganassi Racing with Felix Sabates	Dodge
21	25	Casey Mears	Hendrick Motorsports	Chevrolet
22	19	Elliott Sadler	Evernham Motorsports	Dodge
23	96	Tony Raines	Hall of Fame Racing	Chevrolet
24	6	David Ragan (R)	Roush Fenway Racing	Ford
25	7	Robby Gordon	Robby Gordon Motorsports	Ford
26	40	David Stremme	Chip Ganassi Racing with Felix Sabates	Dodge
27	9	Kasey Kahne	Evernham Motorsports	Dodge
28	41	Reed Sorenson	Chip Ganassi Racing with Felix Sabates	Dodge
29	14	Sterling Marlin	Ginn Racing	Chevrolet
30	66	Jeff Green	Haas CNC Racing	Chevrolet
31	88	Ricky Rudd	Robert Yates Racing	Ford
32	38	David Gilliland (R)	Robert Yates Racing	Ford
33	13	Joe Nemechek	Ginn Racing	Chevrolet
34	45	John Andretti	Petty Enterprises	Dodge
35	70	Johnny Sauter	Haas CNC Racing	Chevrolet
36	83	Brian Vickers	Red Bull Racing Team	Toyota
37	44	Dale Jarrett	Michael Waltrip Racing	Toyota
38	21	Bill Elliott	Wood Brothers Racing	Ford
39	10	Scott Riggs	Evernham Motorsports	Dodge
40	22	Dave Blaney	Bill Davis Racing	Toyota
41	15	Paul Menard (R)	Dale Earnhardt, Inc.	Chevrolet
42	00	David Reutimann (R)	Michael Waltrip Racing	Toyota
43	78	Kenny Wallace	Furniture Row Racing	Chevrolet
Failed to qualify
44	36	Jeremy Mayfield	Bill Davis Racing	Toyota
45	84	A.J. Allmendinger (R)	Red Bull Racing Team	Toyota
46	49	Larry Foyt	BAM Racing	Dodge
47	55	Michael Waltrip	Michael Waltrip Racing	Toyota
48	37	Kevin Lepage	Front Row Motorsports	Dodge
49	4	Ward Burton	Morgan–McClure Motorsports	Chevrolet
50	60	Boris Said	No Fear Racing	Ford
51	09	Mike Wallace	Phoenix Racing	Chevrolet
52	04	Eric McClure	Morgan–McClure Motorsports	Chevrolet
53	27	Kirk Shelmerdine	Kirk Shelmerdine Racing	Chevrolet

== Race ==
Jamie McMurray and Kyle Busch created one of the most memorable finishes, running side-by-side for nearly 32 laps. McMurray defeated Busch to win the Pepsi 400 and claim his second victory and end a 166-race winless streak that had spanned since 2002, when he won in only his second start while subbing for Sterling Marlin. The final margin of victory was .005 seconds, tied for the second-closest margin in NASCAR history since electronic scoring and timing was adopted in 1993. The other Top 5 finishers were Kurt Busch in 3rd, Carl Edwards in 4th, and Jeff Gordon in 5th.

As at the Daytona 500, some of the sport's biggest stars struggled. Kevin Harvick finished 34th while Dale Earnhardt Jr., Tony Stewart, and Denny Hamlin finished 36th, 38th, and 43rd respectively. Despite the fact there were many incidents throughout the race, most were relatively minor and the "Big One" never happened.

== Race results ==
Fin	St	#	Driver	Team	Make	Laps	Led	Status	Pts	Winnings
1	15	26	Jamie McMurray	Roush Fenway Racing	Ford	160	3	running	190	$302,500
2	11	5	Kyle Busch	Hendrick Motorsports	Chevrolet	160	20	running	175	$207,275
3	16	2	Kurt Busch	Penske Racing South	Dodge	160	45	running	170	$197,033
4	7	99	Carl Edwards	Roush Fenway Racing	Ford	160	0	running	160	$158,325
5	1	24	Jeff Gordon	Hendrick Motorsports	Chevrolet	160	9	running	160	$172,261
6	18	16	Greg Biffle	Roush Fenway Racing	Ford	160	0	running	150	$130,750
7	12	07	Clint Bowyer	Richard Childress Racing	Chevrolet	160	55	running	156	$123,800
8	3	17	Matt Kenseth	Roush Fenway Racing	Ford	160	0	running	142	$151,416
9	27	9	Kasey Kahne	Evernham Motorsports	Dodge	160	0	running	138	$148,916
10	4	48	Jimmie Johnson	Hendrick Motorsports	Chevrolet	160	0	running	134	$156,086
11	32	38	David Gilliland (R)	Robert Yates Racing	Ford	160	0	running	130	$133,514
12	24	6	David Ragan (R)	Roush Fenway Racing	Ford	160	0	running	127	$137,250
13	10	1	Martin Truex Jr.	Dale Earnhardt, Inc.	Chevrolet	160	0	running	124	$125,995
14	14	12	Ryan Newman	Penske Racing South	Dodge	160	0	running	121	$129,875
15	25	7	Robby Gordon	Robby Gordon Motorsports	Ford	160	0	running	93	$98,000
16	5	31	Jeff Burton	Richard Childress Racing	Chevrolet	160	0	running	115	$132,366
17	9	01	Mark Martin	Dale Earnhardt, Inc.	Chevrolet	160	0	running	112	$122,283
18	35	70	Johnny Sauter	Haas CNC Racing	Chevrolet	160	0	running	109	$95,100
19	21	25	Casey Mears	Hendrick Motorsports	Chevrolet	160	11	running	111	$119,150
20	17	18	J.J. Yeley	Joe Gibbs Racing	Chevrolet	160	0	running	103	$123,658
21	41	15	Paul Menard (R)	Dale Earnhardt, Inc.	Chevrolet	160	0	running	100	$92,050
22	26	40	David Stremme	Chip Ganassi Racing with Felix Sabates	Dodge	160	0	running	97	$91,325
23	40	22	Dave Blaney	Bill Davis Racing	Toyota	160	0	running	94	$115,658
24	38	21	Bill Elliott	Wood Brothers Racing	Ford	160	2	running	96	$109,339
25	43	78	Kenny Wallace	Furniture Row Racing	Chevrolet	160	1	running	93	$86,575
26	42	00	David Reutimann (R)	Michael Waltrip Racing	Toyota	160	0	running	85	$99,583
27	37	44	Dale Jarrett	Michael Waltrip Racing	Toyota	160	0	running	82	$84,775
28	34	45	John Andretti	Petty Enterprises	Dodge	160	0	running	79	$98,808
29	36	83	Brian Vickers	Red Bull Racing Team	Toyota	160	0	running	76	$86,925
30	33	13	Joe Nemechek	Ginn Racing	Chevrolet	160	0	running	73	$86,750
31	31	88	Ricky Rudd	Robert Yates Racing	Ford	158	0	running	70	$114,608
32	20	42	Juan Pablo Montoya (R)	Chip Ganassi Racing with Felix Sabates	Dodge	157	0	running	67	$118,025
33	22	19	Elliott Sadler	Evernham Motorsports	Dodge	153	0	running	64	$102,620
34	8	29	Kevin Harvick	Richard Childress Racing	Chevrolet	147	3	running	66	$131,936
35	19	43	Bobby Labonte	Petty Enterprises	Dodge	137	1	running	63	$119,961
36	13	8	Dale Earnhardt Jr.	Dale Earnhardt, Inc.	Chevrolet	134	0	running	55	$128,283
37	30	66	Jeff Green	Haas CNC Racing	Chevrolet	131	0	running	52	$100,247
38	6	20	Tony Stewart	Joe Gibbs Racing	Chevrolet	125	0	running	49	$131,086
39	23	96	Tony Raines	Hall of Fame Racing	Chevrolet	120	0	running	46	$90,425
40	29	14	Sterling Marlin	Ginn Racing	Chevrolet	114	0	crash	43	$82,280
41	39	10	Scott Riggs	Evernham Motorsports	Dodge	105	0	engine	40	$90,150
42	28	41	Reed Sorenson	Chip Ganassi Racing with Felix Sabates	Dodge	103	0	running	37	$90,055
43	2	11	Denny Hamlin	Joe Gibbs Racing	Chevrolet	99	10	running	39	$106,611
Failed to qualify
44		36	Jeremy Mayfield	Bill Davis Racing	Toyota					
45		84	A.J. Allmendinger (R)	Red Bull Racing Team	Toyota					
46		49	Larry Foyt	BAM Racing	Dodge					
47		55	Michael Waltrip	Michael Waltrip Racing	Toyota					
48		37	Kevin Lepage	Front Row Motorsports	Dodge					
49		4	Ward Burton	Morgan–McClure Motorsports	Chevrolet					
50		60	Boris Said	No Fear Racing	Ford					
51		09	Mike Wallace	Phoenix Racing	Chevrolet					
52		04	Eric McClure	Morgan–McClure Motorsports	Chevrolet					
53		27	Kirk Shelmerdine	Kirk Shelmerdine Racing	Chevrolet					

== Notes ==
- Kyle Busch missed, by the slimmest of margins, being the first driver to win a Busch Series and a Nextel Cup Series race on the same day. That morning, he had won the Winn-Dixie 250, postponed from Friday night because of rain.
- For the first time since 1965, no one from the Petty family was in the starting lineup for a race at Daytona. Kyle Petty was instead a broadcaster for TNT, and John Andretti took his place in the starting lineup.
- This was the last race which combined the older-design cars with restrictor plates. The next such race, the 2007 UAW-Ford 500 at Talladega Superspeedway, used the Car of Tomorrow which then became standard in 2008.
- Two days after this race, International Speedway Corporation, which owns DIS, signed a multi-year deal with Coca-Cola to sell beverages at all its tracks. That meant that this race would be renamed the Coke Zero 400 as of 2008.
- Clint Bowyer finished 7th in the #07 car, the date was 07/07/07.

Previous race: 2007 Lenox Industrial Tools 300	Nextel Cup Series; 2007 season	Next race: 2007 USG Sheetrock 400
