= 2007 Crown Royal Presents The Jim Stewart 400 =

Race details
- Race 10 of 36 in the 2007 NASCAR Nextel Cup Series season
- Richmond International Speedway
- Date: May 6, 2007
- Official name: Crown Royal Presents The Jim Stewart 400
- Location: Richmond International Raceway, Richmond, Virginia
- Course: Permanent racing facility
- Course length: 0.75 miles (1.207 km)
- Distance: 400 laps, 300 mi (482.803 km)
- Average speed: 91.27 miles per hour (146.88 km/h)

Pole position
Driver	Jeff Gordon	Hendrick Motorsports
- Time: 21.386

Most laps led
Driver	Jeff Gordon	Hendrick Motorsports
- Laps: 114

Winner
No. 48	Jimmie Johnson	Hendrick Motorsports

Television in the United States
- Network: Fox Broadcasting Company
- Announcers: Mike Joy, Darrell Waltrip and Larry McReynolds

The 2007 Crown Royal Presents The Jim Stewart 400 was the tenth race of the 2007 NASCAR Nextel Cup campaign, scheduled to be run on Saturday, May 5, 2007, at Richmond International Raceway in Henrico County, Virginia, just outside the city of Richmond, Virginia's state capital. Rain postponed the race to the following afternoon. This race was the second night race of the season and the fourth to use the Car of Tomorrow template.

== Naming of the Race ==
In late 2006, Crown Royal decided to hold a nationwide contest to see who could write a one paragraph essay with a "Crown Worthy" moment, defined as an event so special that it deserves to be toasted with said sponsor's drink. The winner of the contest was Jim Stewart of Houma, Louisiana, who had the race named in his honor, and this contest was so popular that the "Your Name Here" 400 contest continued in 2008.

== End of a streak ==
Dale Jarrett, driving the #44 Toyota Camry, failed to qualify for this race, marking the first time in 424 races that he failed to make a Cup Series event, last missing the field in October 1994 at North Wilkesboro Speedway. Jarrett was hamstrung by a new rule installed in 2007 that limits past Cup champions to a total of six past champion provisionals, having used all of them through the spring race at Talladega. In addition, Jarrett drives for Michael Waltrip Racing, which have had problems since Waltrip's #55 team had been penalized severely during the qualifying for the 2007 Daytona 500. Toyotas as a whole have not fared well in their maiden season through this point in the year compared to Dodge, Chevrolet and Ford. Only once has a Toyota driver finished in the top 10 of any race (Brian Vickers at the Auto Club 500 at California Speedway).

== The Race ==
Jimmie Johnson was the race winner. It was his fourth win of the year, leading all drivers, and his 27th of his career. This was another dominating performance for Hendrick Motorsports, with Kyle Busch finishing second and Jeff Gordon coming in fourth.

As stated in the opening paragraph, the Jim Stewart 400 was run on Sunday afternoon, May 6 after the scheduled May 5 date was rained out. On that night, the cars ran 12 laps under green-yellow flags before the rain got heavier. The storm never relented, the race was postponed, and those laps were wiped out. The resumption covered all 400 laps.

== Race notes ==
- The race, the first major professional sports event in the Commonwealth of Virginia since the Virginia Tech shooting, was dedicated to the victims of the shootings. Most drivers wore caps with the college's athletic logo, the Fox Sports broadcasters wore pins with the VT logo, and NASCAR announced a contribution of US$160,000 to the Hokie Spirit Memorial Fund. After the race, Johnson drove around the track carrying one of the VT hats; Darian Grubb, the crew chief for the #25 team, was car chief for Johnson during his 2006 championship season and crew chief for his Daytona 500 and UAW-DaimlerChrysler 400 wins because of Chad Knaus' ejection and suspension, is a graduate of the college.
- It was the first daytime race at Richmond since May 2002, which was also due to a postponement.
- The Fox-owned station in Detroit, WJBK, showed the start of the rescheduled race live, but cut off the broadcast at 2:30 p.m. EDT to honor an earlier commitment to show the Tigers' Major League Baseball game in Kansas City (produced by Fox Sports Net Detroit). The rest of the Jim Stewart 400 showed locally in a late-night time slot. Meanwhile, in Las Vegas, local affiliate KVVU-TV joined the race coverage 10 minutes in, but the green flag had not yet dropped at that point. On the other hand, viewers in the Dallas–Fort Worth metroplex were spared from this dilemma as the telecast of the Texas Rangers - Toronto Blue Jays game, produced by FSN Southwest, was moved from Fox-owned affiliate KDFW to corporate sibling (and My Network affiliate) KDFI allowing Fox 4 to carry the race. Because of a switching error, Columbia, SC affiliate WACH joined the race late, at 1:15 PM, just before the start. The station had been committed to airing a movie, and received angry phone calls demanding the race be joined, which took place just before the green flag waved.

== Race results ==
(*) denotes Rookie of the Year candidate.

Fin	St	Driver	Car #	Make	Points	Bonus	Laps	Winnings
1	4	Jimmie Johnson	48	Chevrolet	190	5	400	$244,286
2	34	Kyle Busch	5	Chevrolet	175	5	400	$171,225
3	6	Denny Hamlin	11	Chevrolet	170	5	400	$150,125
4	1	Jeff Gordon	24	Chevrolet	170	10	400	$185,811
5	33	Kurt Busch	2	Dodge	160	5	400	$139,858
6	30	Ryan Newman	12	Dodge	155	5	400	$123,950
7	27	Kevin Harvick	29	Chevrolet	151	5	400	$132,886
8	22	Tony Stewart	20	Chevrolet	147	5	400	$127,236
9	20	Clint Bowyer	7	Chevrolet	138		400	$87,975
10	28	Matt Kenseth	17	Ford	139	5	400	$126,466
11	10	Dave Blaney	22	Toyota	135	5	400	$104,183
12	2	Carl Edwards	99	Ford	127		400	$83,575
13	7	Dale Earnhardt Jr.	8	Chevrolet	124		400	$116,358
14	23	J. J. Yeley	18	Chevrolet	121		400	$101,008
15	18	Bobby Labonte	43	Dodge	118		400	$110,911
16	43	Paul Menard *	15	Chevrolet	115		400	$69,100
17	9	Mark Martin	1	Chevrolet	117	5	400	$95,683
18	15	Casey Mears	25	Chevrolet	109		400	$78,550
19	32	Greg Biffle	16	Ford	106		400	$84,625
20	29	David Ragan *	6	Ford	103		400	$108,875
21	37	Reed Sorenson	41	Dodge	100		400	$92,083
22	19	Tony Raines	96	Chevrolet	102	5	399	$80,200
23	36	Sterling Marlin	14	Chevrolet	94		399	$82,008
24	12	Jeff Green	66	Chevrolet	91		399	$86,697
25	35	Kyle Petty	45	Dodge	88		399	$69,400
26	16	Juan Montoya *	42	Dodge	85		399	$103,250
27	40	Elliott Sadler	19	Dodge	82		398	$86,770
28	8	Martin Truex Jr.	1	Chevrolet	79		398	$94,645
29	14	David Reutimann *	0	Toyota	76		398	$67,675
30	3	Scott Riggs	10	Dodge	73		397	$73,200
31	31	Johnny Benson	146	Toyota	70		397	$64,875
32	13	A. J. Allmendinger *	84	Toyota	67		396	$64,750
33	38	Joe Nemechek	13	Chevrolet	64		393	$64,625
34	42	Robby Gordon	7	Ford	61		378	$65,450
35	24	Ward Burton	4	Chevrolet	58		370	$65,375
36	17	Johnny Sauter	70	Chevrolet	55		370	$64,225
37	11	Ricky Rudd	88	Ford	52		369	$95,133
38	21	David Stremme	40	Dodge	49		362	$63,975
39	26	Kenny Wallace	78	Chevrolet	46		331	$63,850
40	5	Kasey Kahne	9	Dodge	43		314	$110,916
41	25	Jamie McMurray	26	Ford	40		301	$71,580
42	41	David Gilliland	38	Ford	37		275	$90,669
43	39	Jeff Burton	31	Chevrolet	34		139	$103,599

== Notes and references ==
Previous race: 2007 Aaron's 499	Nextel Cup Series; 2007 season	Next race: 2007 Dodge Avenger 500
