= 2007 Subway Fresh Fit 500 =

Motor car race in Arizona, United States

Race details
- Race 8 of 36 in the 2007 NASCAR Nextel Cup Series season
- Map of the Phoenix International Raceway
- Date: April 21, 2007
- Location: Phoenix International Raceway in Avondale, Arizona
- Course: Permanent racing facility
- Course length: 1 miles (1.6 km)
- Distance: 312 laps, 312 mi (502.115 km)
- Weather: Temperatures reaching up to 78.1 °F (25.6 °C); wind speeds up to 14 miles per hour (23 km/h)
- Average speed: 107.71 miles per hour (173.34 km/h)

Pole position
Driver	Jeff Gordon	Hendrick Motorsports
- Time: 27.040

Most laps led
Driver	Tony Stewart	Joe Gibbs Racing
- Laps: 132

Winner
No. 24	Jeff Gordon	Hendrick Motorsports

Television in the United States
- Network: Fox
- Announcers: Mike Joy, Darrell Waltrip and Larry McReynolds

The 2007 Subway Fresh Fit 500 was the eighth race of the 2007 NASCAR Nextel Cup Season, and it ran on April 21, 2007, at Phoenix International Raceway in Avondale, Arizona.

== Summary ==
This race was 500 kilometers (310 mi), one of a few of NASCAR events that use kilometers instead of laps or miles. The race also served as the first night race of the season, and the third race to use the Car of Tomorrow template. In the end, Jeff Gordon scored a historic victory.

=== Race ===
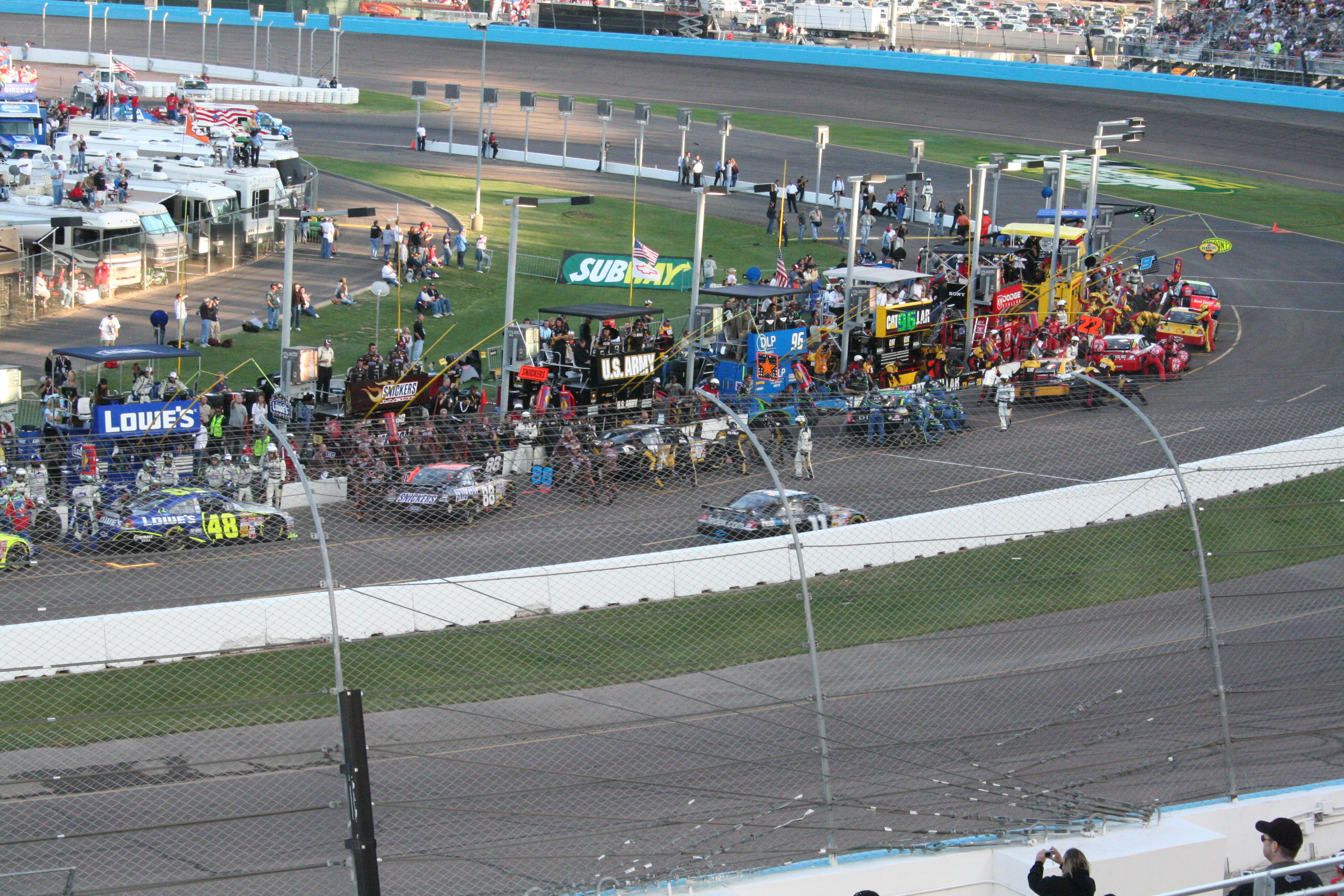
Pit stops taking place during the race.

The third CoT race of the season would be the first test of the new car's aerodynamics. Previously, the CoT definitely kept the racing closer as evidenced by the two half car length finishes. Joe Gibbs Racing's Tony Stewart and Denny Hamlin would be seeking out the team's first victory with the new car. From the drop of the green, Gordon, Stewart, and Hamlin established themselves as the dominant cars of the race. Stewart, despite leading 132 of the 312 laps, would not find victory circle on Saturday night. Hamlin would not fare as well as his teammate as a speeding penalty put him on the tail end of the lead lap. Luck and pit strategy would eventually play a factor in the race. All of that came together during a series of green-flag pit stops on lap 283. Gordon was on pit road when the caution came out. However, quick work by Gordon's pit crew enabled him to stay on the lead lap before a dominant Tony Stewart lapped him. On the lap 298 restart, Tony Stewart made an incredible pass for the lead going 3-wide between Gordon and the tail end car of Martin Truex Jr. However, Gordon would pass Stewart again on lap 300 and would hold on for the win.

The weekend was historic for Jeff Gordon, as the win not only was his first at Phoenix, but it would also be his 76th career victory, tying Dale Earnhardt for 6th on the all-time win list. After the race, Gordon carried a flag with Earnhardt's car number, 3, emblazoned on it during the victory lap.

Gordon was also the first Nextel Cup race winner at Phoenix from the pole position.

=== Qualifying ===
Gordon won his third pole of the year, and 59th of his career, tying Darrell Waltrip on the all-time list. His winning lap was 133.136 miles per hour. Michael Waltrip, Darrell's brother, missed his seventh straight race after making the Daytona 500 to start the year.

=== Tribute ===
All teams carried decal stickers in memory of the 32 people killed in the Virginia Tech massacre the previous Monday; the stickers consisted of the athletic department's logo. In addition, Morgan-McClure Motorsports altered the look of the #4 car driven by Ward Burton to include the logo on the hood of the car. (Burton is from nearby South Boston, Virginia, and Morgan-McClure is based in Abingdon.) Many drivers, including Gordon, Stewart, and Hamlin, wore VT hats throughout the weekend, and PIR displayed the school flag.

In addition, many mechanics are from the school; most notable of these is Darian Grubb of the #25 Hendrick Motorsports Chevrolet Impala.

=== Race results ===
Fin	St	Driver	Car No.	Make	Points	Bonus	Laps	Winnings
1	1	Jeff Gordon	24	Chevrolet	190	5	312	$251,411
2	9	Tony Stewart	20	Chevrolet	180	10	312	$209,411
3	3	Denny Hamlin	11	Chevrolet	170	5	312	$158,150
4	5	Jimmie Johnson	48	Chevrolet	160		312	$158,046
5	17	Matt Kenseth	17	Ford	155		312	$149,766
6	14	Jeff Green	66	Chevrolet	150		312	$124,283
7	24	Kyle Busch	5	Chevrolet	146		312	$97,875
8	26	Bobby Labonte	43	Dodge	142		312	$118,561
9	42	Johnny Sauter	70	Chevrolet	138		312	$79,925
10	8	Kevin Harvick	29	Chevrolet	139	5	312	$126,261
11	28	Carl Edwards	99	Ford	130		312	$83,625
12	20	Mark Martin	01	Chevrolet	127		312	$98,183
13	31	Jeff Burton	31	Chevrolet	124		312	$109,266
14	23	Tony Raines	96	Chevrolet	121		312	$81,925
15	27	Reed Sorenson	41	Dodge	118		312	$93,208
16	16	Joe Nemechek	13	Chevrolet	120	5	312	$65,275
17	18	Greg Biffle	16	Ford	112		312	$83,075
18	6	Kurt Busch	2	Dodge	109		312	$103,108
19	15	Dale Earnhardt Jr.	8	Chevrolet	106		312	$110,058
20	7	Martin Truex Jr.	1	Chevrolet	103		311	$95,920
21	22	J. J. Yeley	18	Chevrolet	100		311	$97,883
22	12	Clint Bowyer	07	Chevrolet	97		311	$75,950
23	2	Jamie McMurray	26	Ford	94		310	$77,175
24	7	Robby Gordon	7	Ford	91		310	$67,475
25	33	Paul Menard *	15	Chevrolet	88		310	$65,350
26	39	Ricky Rudd	88	Ford	85		310	$98,658
27	37	Sterling Marlin	14	Chevrolet	87	5	309	$78,558
28	34	Ken Schrader	21	Ford	79		309	$86,889
29	43	Dale Jarrett	44	Toyota	76		309	$63,350
30	40	Kyle Petty	45	Dodge	78	5	309	$76,347
31	10	Kasey Kahne	9	Dodge	70		309	$110,266
32	25	David Reutimann *	00	Toyota	67		309	$65,925
33	36	Juan Pablo Montoya *	42	Dodge	64		309	$101,325
34	21	Elliott Sadler	19	Dodge	61		308	$83,520
35	30	David Gilliland	38	Ford	58		308	$89,764
36	35	Ward Burton	4	Chevrolet	55		305	$63,150
37	13	Casey Mears	25	Chevrolet	52		303	$70,275
38	19	Ryan Newman	12	Dodge	49		301	$94,200
39	11	Dave Blaney	22	Toyota	46		281	$70,000
40	29	Kenny Wallace	78	Chevrolet	43		279	$61,850
41	32	David Ragan *	6	Ford	40		264	$97,530
42	4	Scott Riggs	10	Dodge	37		250	$69,780
43	41	David Stremme	40	Dodge	34		248	$61,736

Previous race: 2007 Samsung 500	Nextel Cup Series; 2007 season	Next race: 2007 Aaron's 499
