= 2007 NASCAR Nextel Cup Series =

American motorsport season

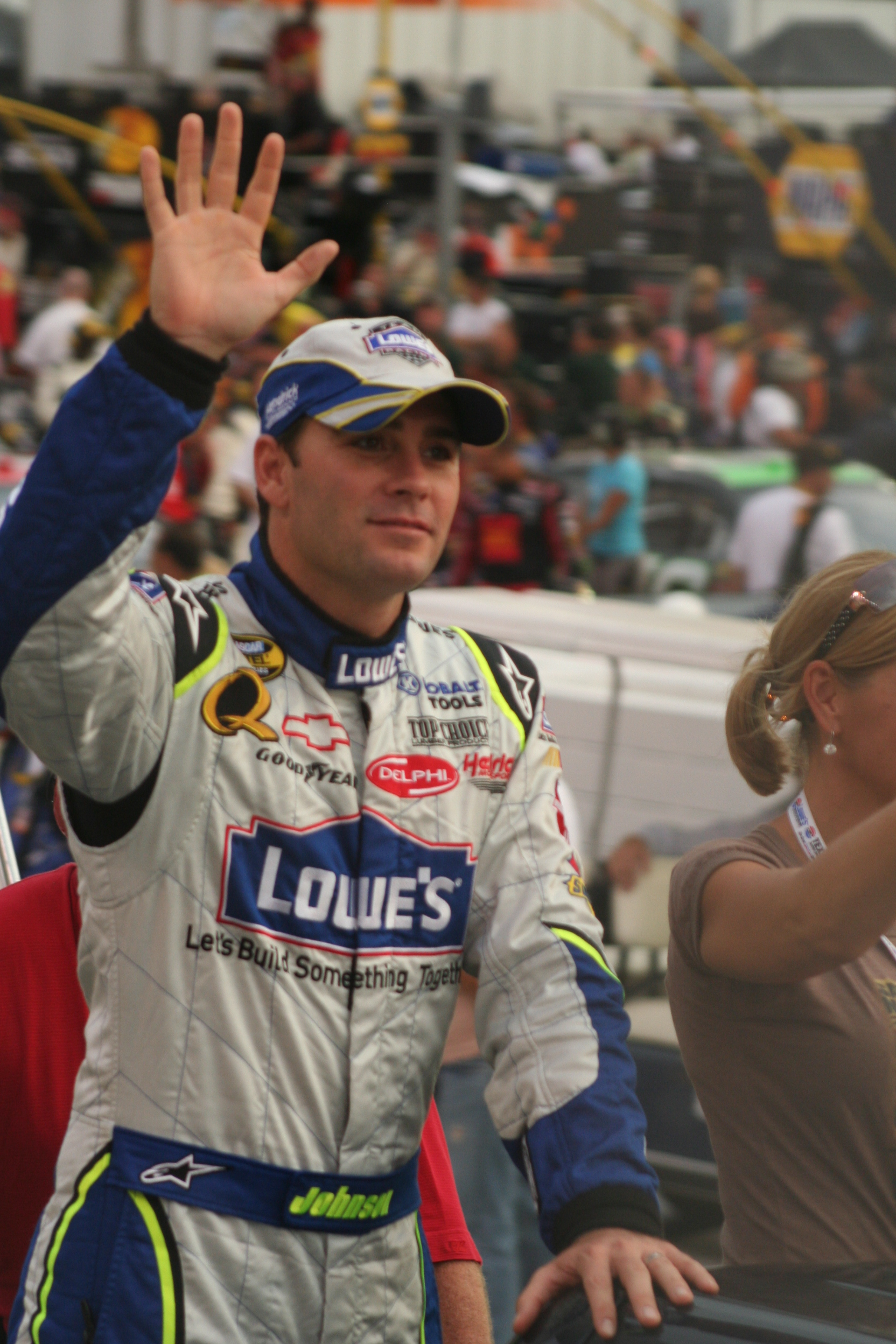
Jimmie Johnson, the 2007 Nextel Cup Series champion. This was the second of his five consecutive titles of seven overall.

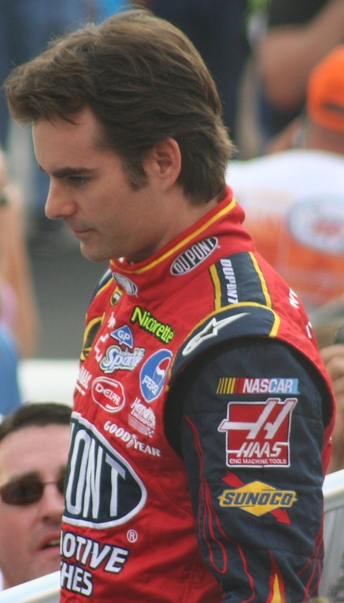
Jeff Gordon the 2007 Nextel Cup Series runner-up.

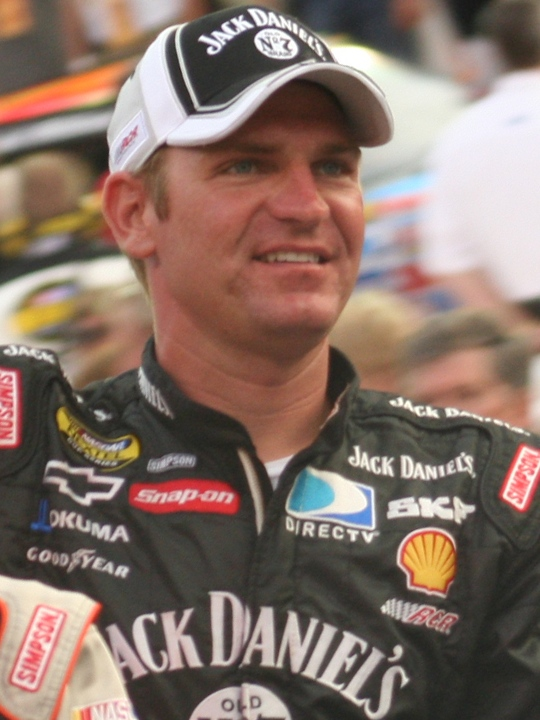
Clint Bowyer finished third in the championship.

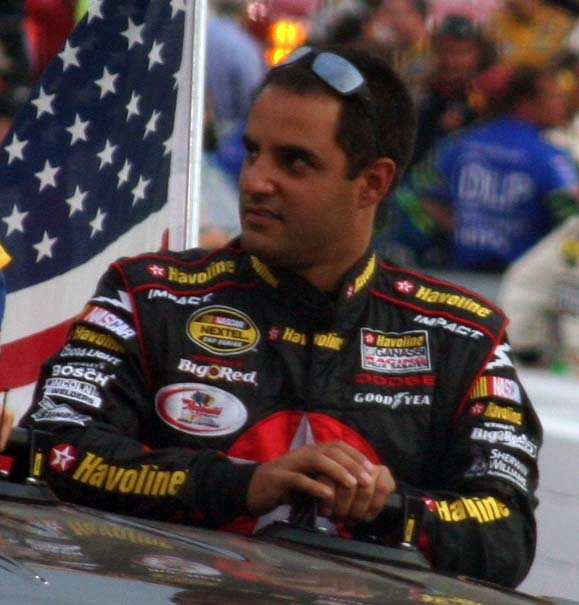
Juan Pablo Montoya, the 2007 rookie of the year.

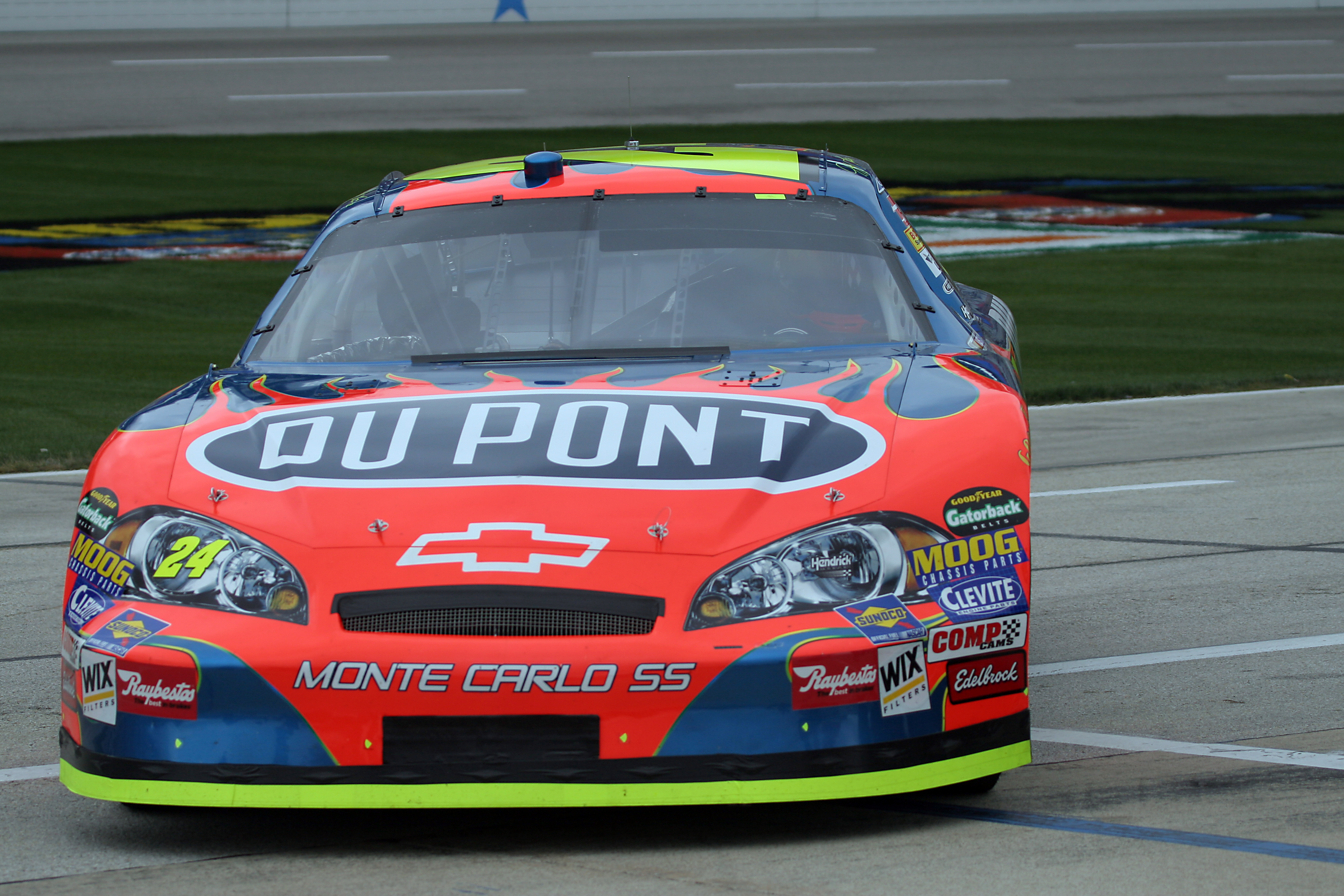
Chevrolet won the Manufacturer's championship with 26 wins.

The 2007 NASCAR Nextel Cup Series was the 59th season of professional stock car racing in the United States and the 36th modern-era Cup series. Beginning on February 10 at Daytona International Speedway with the Budweiser Shootout, the season ended on November 18 at Homestead–Miami Speedway with the Ford 400. The Chase for the Nextel Cup started with the Sylvania 300 at New Hampshire and was contested over the final ten races.

The season was the final year that the NASCAR Cup Series was known as the Nextel Cup Series. As a result of the 2005 merger of Nextel with Sprint Corporation, and the subsequent decision by the newly named Sprint Nextel, the name of the series was changed to the Sprint Cup Series for 2008. The 2007 season was the first year in NASCAR history in which no North Carolina drivers found victory lane. This was also the final year for the Chevrolet Monte Carlo which was replaced by the Chevrolet Impala during the Car of Tomorrow races and full time in 2008. This 2007 season marks the first season in the Nextel Cup Series to feature Toyota, using the Camry model.

Jimmie Johnson of Hendrick Motorsports won his second consecutive championship, with teammate Jeff Gordon finishing second. Chevrolet captured the NASCAR Manufacturers' Championship with 26 wins, and 290 points over second-place Ford who had 7 wins and 208 points. Dodge finished third with 3 wins and 178 points and Toyota, in their first NEXTEL Cup season, finished out with no wins and 116 points.

== Top stories and controversies ==
=== Changes in the points system and The Chase ===
It was officially announced on January 22 at the annual NASCAR Media Tour in Charlotte, North Carolina that two changes were made for the 2007 Chase for the Nextel Cup.

The first is that wins became more important. The driver who finishes first now received 185 points instead of 180. Including the five bonus points for leading a lap and the possible five bonus points for leading the most laps, a driver could now get a maximum of 195 points for winning a race.

The other changes involved the actual Chase. The Top 12 drivers after the Chevy Rock & Roll 400 automatically qualified for the 2007 Chase. Additionally, each driver had their points reset to 5,000, plus ten for each win during the first 26 races. However, when the season ended, only the Top 10 drivers would be honored at the annual banquet in New York City at the Waldorf Astoria New York.

=== Car of Tomorrow ===
NASCAR introduced a new car style known as the "Car of Tomorrow" for use in sixteen races in 2007. This car was the result of a design program that started after the death of Dale Earnhardt in the 2001 Daytona 500. It was intended to offer improvements in safety, performance, competition, and cost efficiency. Plans for a partial schedule in 2008 were expanded to full usage after race results and owner feedback led to acceptance of the new car. Some drivers, however, offered criticism over the decision, thinking that the new design led to boring, uncompetitive races.

=== AT&T, Inc. vs. NASCAR ===
AT&T and BellSouth's Cingular brand, sponsor of Richard Childress Racing's No. 31 car, was legally renamed AT&T upon BellSouth acquisition by AT&T, and has been phased out. This is not allowed under the grandfather clause in the original sponsorship agreement between the former Nextel Communications (now Sprint Nextel) with NASCAR and on March 16, it was announced that AT&T had filed suit in Atlanta Federal Court seeking to overturn said grandfather clause because of this and allow AT&T decals on the car. A judge ruled that RCR was allowed to put AT&T decals on the car on May 18, and the decals made their debut the following night in the Nextel All-Star Challenge. NASCAR originally had a say when the judge ruled in RCR's favor, but that was later rescinded.

The legal wrangling continued as on June 17, NASCAR countersued AT&T for US$100 million. NASCAR won the appeal on August 13, and eleven days later at Bristol, NASCAR ordered AT&T logos removed from the No. 31 car, and AT&T filed for an injunction to get the decals back on. Sprint Nextel, AT&T, and NASCAR settled their differences on September 7, and the AT&T logos were placed back on Burton's ride in time for the Chevy Rock & Roll 400. These features would remain on the car's body for the rest of the season and into 2008, but RCR afterwards found a new sponsor to replace AT&T. When Caterpillar signed on for the 2009 season, the team agreed to have them as the No. 31's main sponsor.

=== Robby Gordon and Motorola ===
Motorola is an associate sponsor on Robby Gordon's No. 7 car. When his self-owned team, however, tried to put a Motorola decal on the car for the Kobalt Tools 500 at Atlanta Motor Speedway on March 18, NASCAR ruled that this was in breach of the exclusivity clause with Sprint Nextel (even though Nextel uses Motorola phones) because NASCAR noticed this deal was part of Cellco Partnership (a joint partnership of Verizon and Vodafone better known as the trade name Verizon Wireless), which (legally) sponsored his Busch Series car. NASCAR and Sprint later relented as it was decided to allow Motorola's Audio Products Division to be the main sponsor.

=== Shell logo controversy ===
Another controversy surrounded Shell and Sunoco. Sunoco does exclusively supply gasoline to NASCAR, yet Richard Childress Racing signed Shell and their Pennzoil brand to the No. 29 car driven by Daytona 500 winner Kevin Harvick. During the 500, the car had large Shell decals and large Shell logos on uniforms worn by Harvick and his team. Shell logos were ordered to be smaller for the following week's race at Auto Club. This was likely done at Sunoco's request since a rival gasoline company sponsored a car winning NASCAR's premier event, having taken away publicity from an official sponsor.

=== Mark Martin's schedule ===
The other concerned the part-time schedule being undertaken by Mark Martin. Through the spring Atlanta race, Martin held the points lead. Because he had planned a part-time schedule in the No. 01 Ginn Racing United States Army ride, Martin reiterated that he would not run in all 36 races on the circuit despite finishing second in the Daytona 500. He relinquished the lead by passing on the spring races at Bristol and Martinsville. Rookie drivers Regan Smith and Aric Almirola drove the No. 01 car in those races, as owner points had that car an exempt team for Bristol (from 2006) and Martinsville. However, Martin extended his schedule to include a few more points races, but did not race the full season.

=== Dale Earnhardt Jr. signs 5-year contract with Hendrick Motorsports ===
On May 10, it was announced that Dale Earnhardt Jr. would be leaving the No. 8 Budweiser Chevrolet following the conclusion of the season as he could not get a contract extension with Dale Earnhardt, Inc., the driving team his father founded and run by his stepmother, Teresa Earnhardt. Speculation according to WFXT in Boston had him going to Richard Childress Racing where the "unretirement" of the No. 3 car that his father drove to seven then-Winston Cup championships and the 1998 Daytona 500 would have happened. Other rumors had him going to Joe Gibbs Racing, or had him starting a Nextel Cup team with the organization he owns that fields Busch Series cars, JR Motorsports. However, at a press conference on June 13, Dale Earnhardt Jr. announced a five-year deal to join Hendrick Motorsports. He replaced Kyle Busch, who at the time drove the No. 5 Chevrolet; he subsequently joined Joe Gibbs Racing to replace J. J. Yeley in the No. 18 Toyota. Busch was replaced in the No. 5 by Casey Mears. On September 19, it was announced that Jr. had signed on to drive Hendrick's new No. 88 Mountain Dew Amp/National Guard Chevrolet. Junior's crew chief at DEI, Tony Eury Jr. will make the move with him, leaving his position after the fall race at Talladega.

=== Merger Mania ===
Before the season-opening Daytona 500, NASCAR team owner Jack Roush announced the selloff of 50% of his team, Roush Racing to the Fenway Sports Group, who owns the Boston Red Sox Major League Baseball team. The newly formed alliance between two differing sports markets involved the team name to change to Roush Fenway Racing. However, this was only the beginning of what was referred to as "Merger mania".

The week before the Brickyard 400 became the week NASCAR was all shaken up in the ownership boxes. On July 24, Dale Earnhardt, Inc. merged with Ginn Racing, inheriting the No. 01 US Army ride of Mark Martin and Aric Almirola, putting the points earned by the No. 14 team points earned to Paul Menard's No. 15 team and the closure of the No. 13 team while releasing Sterling Marlin and Joe Nemechek. The next day, Newman/Haas/Lanigan Racing, a regular in the Champ Car World Series, returned after a prolonged absence by buying Robert Yates Racing NASCAR team, and renamed the combined operation Yates/Newman/Haas/Lanigan Racing. With the announced retirement of Robert Yates, however, the merger was called off and the team was named Yates Racing with Robert's son Doug Yates at the helm. Another merger was announced on August 6 when former crew chief Ray Evernham announced the merger of his team, Evernham Motorsports, with George N. Gillett Jr., owner of the National Hockey League team the Montreal Canadiens and co-owner of the English Premier League soccer team Liverpool. The merger was similar to the Roush Fenway merger as the new team was called Gillett Evernham Motorsports. During the weekend of the Sharp AQUOS 500, Hall of Fame Racing owners Troy Aikman and Roger Staubach, former football players for the Dallas Cowboys, announced their merger with Major League Baseball's Arizona Diamondbacks CEO Jeff Moorad and COO Tom Garfinkel. Michael Waltrip Racing, a company created as a 50–50 partnership between Robert Kauffman and Michael Waltrip, was announced the weekend of the Bank of America 500 at Charlotte. Waltrip, a two-time Daytona 500 winner, originally formed MWR in 1996. Cal Wells, himself a former owner in NASCAR was named the team's chief executive officer.

=== Joe Gibbs Racing to Toyota ===
During the season rumors began to surface that Joe Gibbs Racing, owned by then-Washington Commanders coach Joe Gibbs, would be switching to the new manufacturer Toyota for the 2008 season. This switch would be significant for several reasons, one of them being that JGR had been allied with General Motors since its inception in 1992, first with Chevrolet then beginning in 1997 with Pontiac, then switched back to Chevrolet in 2003, a year before Pontiac left NASCAR. The switch to Toyota would benefit the manufacturer itself, as they would be allied with a championship-caliber team. As JGR loans equipment to Hall of Fame Racing, the team confirmed that they would also switch to Toyota if JGR did so. On September 5, the rumors were confirmed.

=== Dale Jarrett announces retirement ===
During the race weekend for the Bank of America 500 at Lowe's Motor Speedway, Michael Waltrip Racing held a press conference. During the announcement, besides the announcement of a new part-owner on Robert Kaufmann and Cal Wells being named CEO, it was revealed to the racing world that 1999 Cup champion and three-time Daytona 500 winner Dale Jarrett would retire from full-time driving following the end of the 2007 season. In 2008, Jarrett drove in the first five points races, then handed the No. 44 Toyota to David Reutimann for the Goody's Cool Orange 500. As Jarrett was the 1999 champion, entering the first five races, regardless of his previous standings, guaranteed his No. 44 in the field, as well as driving in the Clash and the All-Star Race.

== Teams and drivers ==
Each Nextel Cup race had a field of 43 cars.

For the first five races of 2007, the top 35 teams in owners points (not drivers' points) in 2006 earned an exemption into each race. If a driver went to a new team, he did not have a guaranteed starting spot, but his old team did, except if that new team was an exempt team. If a past champion is not driving for an exempt team (outside the top 35 in owner points), he may be eligible to use a past champions' provisional to enter the race. The provisional guarantees a spot to the most recent champion not exempt, but those who are former champions will be limited to six for the entire 2007 season.

Teams not exempt must "race" their way in during qualifying – if 47 cars are attempting to make the race, and no one is using a provisional, then there are 12 cars racing for eight spots, and the eight fastest cars will make the race. (The Daytona 500, which uses a different qualifying procedure, is the only exception to this rule, though the top 35 are still locked in.)

Starting with the sixth race in 2007, the top 35 teams were awarded exemptions for the next race.

=== Complete schedule ===
List of the NASCAR Nextel Cup Series teams in 2007 (45 full-time).

Manufacturer	Team	No.	Driver(s)	Crew Chief
Chevrolet	Dale Earnhardt, Inc. 1	01	Mark Martin 24	Ryan Pemberton
Chevrolet	Dale Earnhardt, Inc. 1	01	Regan Smith 7	Ryan Pemberton
Chevrolet	Dale Earnhardt, Inc. 1	01	Aric Almirola 5	Ryan Pemberton
Chevrolet	Dale Earnhardt, Inc. 1	1	Martin Truex Jr.	Kevin Manion
Chevrolet	Dale Earnhardt, Inc. 1	8	Dale Earnhardt Jr.	Tony Eury Jr. 30; Tony Gibson 6
Chevrolet	Dale Earnhardt, Inc. 1	15	Paul Menard (R)	Dan Stillman 7 Tony Eury Sr. 9 Dave Charpentier 20
Chevrolet	Furniture Row Racing	78	Kenny Wallace 22	Jay Guy
Chevrolet	Furniture Row Racing	78	Scott Wimmer 1	Jay Guy
Chevrolet	Furniture Row Racing	78	Sterling Marlin 1	Jay Guy
Chevrolet	Furniture Row Racing	78	Joe Nemechek 12	Jay Guy
Chevrolet	Haas CNC Racing	66	Jeff Green 32	Harold Holly
Chevrolet	Haas CNC Racing	66	Jeremy Mayfield 4	Harold Holly
Chevrolet	Haas CNC Racing	70	Johnny Sauter	Bootie Barker
Chevrolet	Hall of Fame Racing	96	Tony Raines 34	Brandon Thomas
Chevrolet	Hall of Fame Racing	96	Ron Fellows 2	Brandon Thomas
Chevrolet	Hendrick Motorsports	5	Kyle Busch	Alan Gustafson
Chevrolet	Hendrick Motorsports	24	Jeff Gordon	Steve Letarte 32; Jeff Meendering 4
Chevrolet	Hendrick Motorsports	25	Casey Mears	Darian Grubb
Chevrolet	Hendrick Motorsports	48	Jimmie Johnson	Chad Knaus 30; Ron Malec 6
Chevrolet	Joe Gibbs Racing	11	Denny Hamlin	Mike Ford
Chevrolet	Joe Gibbs Racing	18	J. J. Yeley	Steve Addington
Chevrolet	Joe Gibbs Racing	20	Tony Stewart	Greg Zipadelli
Chevrolet	Morgan-McClure Motorsports	4	Ward Burton 35	Chris Carrier
Chevrolet	Morgan-McClure Motorsports	4	Todd Bodine 1	Chris Carrier
Chevrolet	Richard Childress Racing	07	Clint Bowyer	Gil Martin
Chevrolet	Richard Childress Racing	29	Kevin Harvick	Todd Berrier
Chevrolet	Richard Childress Racing	31	Jeff Burton	Scott Miller
Dodge	BAM Racing	49	Mike Bliss 16	Lee McCall
Dodge	BAM Racing	49	Klaus Graf 2	Lee McCall
Dodge	BAM Racing	49	Chad Chaffin 2	Lee McCall
Dodge	BAM Racing	49	Larry Foyt 1	Lee McCall
Dodge	BAM Racing	49	Ken Schrader 1	Lee McCall
Dodge	BAM Racing	49	John Andretti 14	Lee McCall
Dodge	Chip Ganassi Racing with Felix Sabates	40	David Stremme	Steven Lane
Dodge	Chip Ganassi Racing with Felix Sabates	41	Reed Sorenson	Jimmy Elledge
Dodge	Chip Ganassi Racing with Felix Sabates	42	Juan Pablo Montoya (R)	Donnie Wingo
Dodge	Gillett Evernham Motorsports	9	Kasey Kahne	Keith Rodden 4 Kenny Francis 32
Dodge	Gillett Evernham Motorsports	10	Scott Riggs 33	Ray Evernham 2 Rodney Childers 31; Scott McDougall 3
Dodge	Gillett Evernham Motorsports	10	Patrick Carpentier 3	Ray Evernham 2 Rodney Childers 31; Scott McDougall 3
Dodge	Gillett Evernham Motorsports	19	Elliott Sadler	Scott McDougall 18; Josh Browne 15; Rodney Childers 3
Dodge	Penske Racing South	2	Kurt Busch	Roy McCauley 6 Troy Raker 9 Pat Tryson 21
Dodge	Penske Racing South	12	Ryan Newman	Mike Nelson
Dodge	Petty Enterprises	43	Bobby Labonte	Paul Andrews 22; Doug Randolph 14
Dodge	Petty Enterprises	45	Kyle Petty 29	Billy Wilburn
Dodge	Petty Enterprises	45	Chad McCumbee 2	Billy Wilburn
Dodge	Petty Enterprises	45	John Andretti 4	Billy Wilburn
Dodge	Petty Enterprises	45	Kenny Wallace 1	Billy Wilburn
Ford	Robby Gordon Motorsports	7	Robby Gordon 35	Greg Erwin 12; Gene Nead 20; Peter Sospenzo 4
Ford	Robby Gordon Motorsports	7	P. J. Jones 1	Greg Erwin 12; Gene Nead 20; Peter Sospenzo 4
Ford	Robert Yates Racing	38	David Gilliland (R)	Todd Parrott
Ford	Robert Yates Racing	88	Ricky Rudd 31	Butch Hylton 29; Cully Barraclough 7
Ford	Robert Yates Racing	88	Kenny Wallace 4	Butch Hylton 29; Cully Barraclough 7
Ford	Robert Yates Racing	88	Mike Wallace 1	Butch Hylton 29; Cully Barraclough 7
Ford	Roush Fenway Racing	6	David Ragan (R)	Jimmy Fennig
Ford	Roush Fenway Racing	16	Greg Biffle	Pat Tryson 12; Greg Erwin 24
Ford	Roush Fenway Racing	17	Matt Kenseth	Chip Bolin 4 Robbie Reiser 32
Ford	Roush Fenway Racing	26	Jamie McMurray	Larry Carter
Ford	Roush Fenway Racing	99	Carl Edwards	Bob Osborne
Ford	Wood Brothers/JTG Racing	21	Ken Schrader 14	Ernie Cope 16; Michael McSwain 17; Gene Nead 3
Ford	Wood Brothers/JTG Racing	21	Jon Wood 1	Ernie Cope 16; Michael McSwain 17; Gene Nead 3
Ford	Wood Brothers/JTG Racing	21	Bill Elliott 20	Ernie Cope 16; Michael McSwain 17; Gene Nead 3
Ford	Wood Brothers/JTG Racing	21	Boris Said 1	Ernie Cope 16; Michael McSwain 17; Gene Nead 3
Toyota	Bill Davis Racing	22	Dave Blaney	Kevin Hamlin 12; Tommy Baldwin Jr. 24
Toyota	Michael Waltrip Racing	00	David Reutimann (R) 34	Frankie Kerr
Toyota	Michael Waltrip Racing	00	P. J. Jones 2	Frankie Kerr
Toyota	Michael Waltrip Racing	44	Dale Jarrett	Matt Borland 9 Jason Burdett 27
Toyota	Michael Waltrip Racing	55	Michael Waltrip 33	Scott Eggelston 7 Buddy Sisco 29
Toyota	Michael Waltrip Racing	55	Terry Labonte 3	Scott Eggelston 7 Buddy Sisco 29
Toyota	Team Red Bull	83	Brian Vickers	Doug Richert 33; Randy Cox 3
Toyota	Team Red Bull	84	A. J. Allmendinger (R)	Ricky Viers

=== Limited schedule ===
Manufacturer	Team	No.	Driver	Crew chief	Round(s)
Chevrolet	CJM Racing	72	Brandon Whitt	Sammy Speaks	3
Chevrolet	Ginn Racing	13	Joe Nemechek	Peter Sospenzo	19
Chevrolet	Ginn Racing	14	Sterling Marlin	Slugger Labbe	19
Chevrolet	Ginn Racing	39	Regan Smith	Doug Randolph	2
Chevrolet	Hylton Motorsports	58	James Hylton	James Hylton Jr.	1
Chevrolet	Joe Gibbs Racing	80	Aric Almirola	Jason Ratcliff	1
Chevrolet	Kirk Shelmerdine Racing	27	Kirk Shelmerdine	Phil Harris	3
Chevrolet	Morgan-McClure Motorsports	04	Eric McClure	Robert Larkins	2
Chevrolet	Phoenix Racing	09	Mike Wallace	Fred Wanke	3
Chevrolet	Phoenix Racing	09	Sterling Marlin	Fred Wanke	3
Chevrolet	Richard Childress Racing	33	Scott Wimmer	Bobby Leslie	4
Chevrolet	Rick Ware Racing	30	Stanton Barrett	Cal Northrop	1
Dodge	Brandon Ash Racing	02	Brandon Ash	Kenneth Wood	2
Dodge	E&M Motorsports	08	Joe Nemechek	Mark Tutor	2
Dodge	E&M Motorsports	08	Carl Long	Mark Tutor	1
Dodge	E&M Motorsports	08	Burney Lamar	Mark Tutor	1
Dodge	Front Row Motorsports	34	Kevin Lepage	Randy Seals	7
Dodge	Front Row Motorsports	34	Stanton Barrett	Randy Seals	1
Dodge	Front Row Motorsports	37	Bill Elliott	Mark Tutor	1
Dodge	Front Row Motorsports	37	John Andretti	Mark Tutor	6
Dodge	Front Row Motorsports	37	Kevin Lepage	Mark Tutor	19
Dodge	Front Row Motorsports	37	Brian Simo	Mark Tutor	2
Dodge	Gillett Evernham Motorsports	98	Boris Said	Randy Seals	1
Dodge	McGlynn Racing	74	Derrike Cope	Dom Turse	1
Dodge	Penske Racing South	06	Sam Hornish Jr.	Roy McCauley	8
Ford	Fast Track Racing	71	Frank Kimmel	Andy Hillenburg	1
Ford	No Fear Racing	60	Boris Said	Frank Stoddard	6
Ford	Robby Gordon Motorsports	77	Marcos Ambrose	Ernie Cope	1
Ford	Wood Brothers/JTG Racing	47	Ken Schrader	Gene Nead	1
Ford	Wood Brothers/JTG Racing	47	Jon Wood	Gene Nead	1
Toyota	Bill Davis Racing	23*	Mike Skinner	Slugger Labbe	1
Toyota	Bill Davis Racing	23*	Butch Leitzinger	Slugger Labbe	1
Toyota	Bill Davis Racing	27	Jacques Villeneuve	Slugger Labbe	2
Toyota	Bill Davis Racing	36	Jeremy Mayfield*	Derrick Finley	31
Toyota	Bill Davis Racing	36	Mike Skinner	Derrick Finley	2
Toyota	Bill Davis Racing	36	Johnny Benson	Derrick Finley	2
Toyota	Riley D'Hondt Motorsports	91	Marc Goossens	Jerry Pitts	1
Toyota	Wyler Racing	46	Johnny Benson	Tony Furr	1

- The 36 team usually driven by Jeremy Mayfield ran Infineon as the 23 with Butch Leitzinger behind the wheel. Mayfield's sponsor, 360 OTC, had an agreement with Bill Davis Racing and Caterpillar Inc. for the 36 to run as 23 with Leitzinger, because California is the home state of Caterpillar. The 36 would return the following race.

== Schedule ==
No.	Race title	Track	Date
	Budweiser Shootout	Daytona International Speedway, Daytona Beach	February 10
	Gatorade Duel	Daytona International Speedway, Daytona Beach	February 15
1	Daytona 500	Daytona International Speedway, Daytona Beach	February 18
2	Auto Club 500	California Speedway, Fontana	February 25
3	UAW-DaimlerChrysler 400	Las Vegas Motor Speedway, Las Vegas, Nevada	March 11
4	Kobalt Tools 500	Atlanta Motor Speedway, Hampton	March 18
5	Food City 500	Bristol Motor Speedway, Bristol	March 25
6	Goody's Cool Orange 500	Martinsville Speedway, Ridgeway	April 1
7	Samsung 500	Texas Motor Speedway, Fort Worth	April 15
8	Subway Fresh Fit 500	Phoenix International Raceway, Phoenix	April 21
9	Aaron's 499	Talladega Superspeedway, Talladega	April 29
10	Crown Royal presents the Jim Stewart 400	Richmond International Raceway, Richmond	May 6
11	Dodge Avenger 500	Darlington Raceway, Darlington	May 13
	Nextel Open	Lowe's Motor Speedway, Concord	May 19
	Nextel All-Star Challenge	Lowe's Motor Speedway, Concord	May 19
12	Coca-Cola 600	Lowe's Motor Speedway, Concord	May 27
13	Autism Speaks 400 presented by Visa	Dover International Speedway, Dover	June 4
14	Pocono 500	Pocono Raceway, Long Pond	June 10
15	Citizens Bank 400	Michigan International Speedway, Brooklyn	June 17
16	Toyota/Save Mart 350	Infineon Raceway, Sonoma	June 24
17	Lenox Industrial Tools 300	New Hampshire International Speedway, Loudon	July 1
18	Pepsi 400	Daytona International Speedway, Daytona Beach	July 7
19	USG Sheetrock 400	Chicagoland Speedway, Joliet	July 15
20	Allstate 400 at the Brickyard	Indianapolis Motor Speedway, Speedway	July 29
21	Pennsylvania 500	Pocono Raceway, Long Pond	August 5
22	Centurion Boats at The Glen	Watkins Glen International, Watkins Glen	August 12
23	3M Performance 400	Michigan International Speedway, Brooklyn	August 21
24	Sharpie 500	Bristol Motor Speedway, Bristol	August 25
25	Sharp AQUOS 500	California Speedway, Fontana	September 2
26	Chevy Rock & Roll 400	Richmond International Raceway, Richmond	September 8
Chase for the Nextel Cup
27	Sylvania 300	New Hampshire International Speedway, Loudon	September 16
28	Dodge Dealers 400	Dover International Speedway, Dover	September 23
29	LifeLock 400	Kansas Speedway, Kansas City	September 30
30	UAW-Ford 500	Talladega Superspeedway, Talladega	October 7
31	Bank of America 500	Lowe's Motor Speedway, Concord	October 13
32	Subway 500	Martinsville Speedway, Ridgeway	October 21
33	Pep Boys Auto 500	Atlanta Motor Speedway, Hampton	October 28
34	Dickies 500	Texas Motor Speedway, Fort Worth	November 4
35	Checker Auto Parts 500 presented by Pennzoil	Phoenix International Raceway, Phoenix	November 11
36	Ford 400	Homestead–Miami Speedway, Homestead	November 18

== Races ==
No.	Race	Pole position	Most laps led	Winning driver	Manufacturer
	Budweiser Shootout	Dale Jarrett	Kyle Busch	Tony Stewart	Chevrolet
	Gatorade Duel 1	David Gilliland	Tony Stewart	Tony Stewart	Chevrolet
	Gatorade Duel 2	Ricky Rudd	Kyle Busch	Jeff Gordon	Chevrolet
1	Daytona 500	David Gilliland	Kurt Busch	Kevin Harvick	Chevrolet
2	Auto Club 500	Jeff Gordon	Matt Kenseth	Matt Kenseth	Ford
3	UAW-Daimler Chrysler 400	Kasey Kahne	Jeff Gordon	Jimmie Johnson	Chevrolet
4	Kobalt Tools 500	Ryan Newman	Jimmie Johnson	Jimmie Johnson	Chevrolet
5	Food City 500	Jeff Gordon	Tony Stewart	Kyle Busch	Chevrolet
6	Goody's Cool Orange 500	Denny Hamlin	Dale Earnhardt Jr.	Jimmie Johnson	Chevrolet
7	Samsung 500	Jeff Gordon	Jeff Gordon	Jeff Burton	Chevrolet
8	Subway Fresh Fit 500	Jeff Gordon	Tony Stewart	Jeff Gordon	Chevrolet
9	Aaron's 499	Jeff Gordon	Jeff Gordon	Jeff Gordon	Chevrolet
10	Crown Royal presents the Jim Stewart 400	Jeff Gordon	Jeff Gordon	Jimmie Johnson	Chevrolet
11	Dodge Avenger 500	Clint Bowyer	Denny Hamlin	Jeff Gordon	Chevrolet
	Nextel Open	Carl Edwards	Carl Edwards	Martin Truex Jr.	Chevrolet
	Nextel All-Star Challenge	Matt Kenseth	Matt Kenseth	Kevin Harvick	Chevrolet
12	Coca-Cola 600	Ryan Newman	Kurt Busch	Casey Mears	Chevrolet
13	Autism Speaks 400 presented by Visa	Ryan Newman	Martin Truex Jr.	Martin Truex Jr.	Chevrolet
14	Pocono 500	Ryan Newman	Denny Hamlin	Jeff Gordon	Chevrolet
15	Citizens Bank 400	J. J. Yeley	Carl Edwards	Carl Edwards	Ford
16	Toyota/Save Mart 350	Jamie McMurray	Robby Gordon	Juan Pablo Montoya	Dodge
17	Lenox Industrial Tools 300	Dave Blaney	Dale Earnhardt Jr.	Denny Hamlin	Chevrolet
18	Pepsi 400	Jeff Gordon	Clint Bowyer	Jamie McMurray	Ford
19	USG Sheetrock 400	Casey Mears	Tony Stewart	Tony Stewart	Chevrolet
20	Allstate 400 at the Brickyard	Reed Sorenson	Tony Stewart	Tony Stewart	Chevrolet
21	Pennsylvania 500	Dale Earnhardt Jr.	Kurt Busch	Kurt Busch	Dodge
22	Centurion Boats at The Glen	Jeff Gordon	Jeff Gordon	Tony Stewart	Chevrolet
23	3M Performance 400	Jeff Gordon	Kurt Busch	Kurt Busch	Dodge
24	Sharpie 500	Kasey Kahne	Kasey Kahne	Carl Edwards	Ford
25	Sharp AQUOS 500	Kurt Busch	Kyle Busch	Jimmie Johnson	Chevrolet
26	Chevy Rock & Roll 400	Jimmie Johnson	Jeff Gordon	Jimmie Johnson	Chevrolet
27	Sylvania 300	Clint Bowyer	Clint Bowyer	Clint Bowyer	Chevrolet
28	Dodge Dealers 400	Jimmie Johnson	Matt Kenseth	Carl Edwards	Ford
29	LifeLock 400	Jimmie Johnson	Kurt Busch	Greg Biffle	Ford
30	UAW-Ford 500	Michael Waltrip	Denny Hamlin	Jeff Gordon	Chevrolet
31	Bank of America 500	Ryan Newman	Jimmie Johnson	Jeff Gordon	Chevrolet
32	Subway 500	Jeff Gordon	Jeff Gordon	Jimmie Johnson	Chevrolet
33	Pep Boys Auto 500	Greg Biffle	Martin Truex Jr.	Jimmie Johnson	Chevrolet
34	Dickies 500	Martin Truex Jr.	Kyle Busch	Jimmie Johnson	Chevrolet
35	Checker Auto Parts 500 presented by Pennzoil	Carl Edwards	Matt Kenseth	Jimmie Johnson	Chevrolet
36	Ford 400	Jimmie Johnson	Matt Kenseth	Matt Kenseth	Ford

== Regular season ==
=== Budweiser Shootout ===
This non-points race, which involves the previous season's pole winners and past Clash winners, was held on Saturday, February 10, at Daytona International Speedway officially kicking off Speedweeks. Two-time series champion Tony Stewart took the checkered flag, but as he did so, Dale Earnhardt Jr. made contact with the back bumper of Elliott Sadler, causing a five-car wreck less than 1000 feet from the start/finish line.

One of the biggest headlines for the Shootout was that it would be the first Nextel Cup race to feature Toyota, and in the draw for starting spots, Dale Jarrett, a Toyota driver, drew the pole position. However, he slid to the back within four laps of the start, and stayed there for most of the race. Brian Vickers, the other Toyota driver in the event, started fourth, and though he went back-and-forth through the field, finished eighth.

Budweiser Shootout
pos. 1–5					pos. 6–10				
Pos.	No.	Driver	Car	Team	Pos.	No.	Driver	Car	Team
1	20	Tony Stewart	Chevrolet	Joe Gibbs Racing	6	01	Mark Martin	Chevrolet	Ginn Racing
2	38	David Gilliland	Ford	Robert Yates Racing	7	5	Kyle Busch	Chevrolet	Hendrick Motorsports
3	2	Kurt Busch	Dodge	Penske Racing	8	83	Brian Vickers	Toyota	Team Red Bull
4	48	Jimmie Johnson	Chevrolet	Hendrick Motorsports	9	31	Jeff Burton	Chevrolet	Richard Childress Racing
5	29	Kevin Harvick	Chevrolet	Richard Childress Racing	10	10	Scott Riggs	Dodge	Evernham Motorsports

=== Daytona 500 ===
==== Qualifying and Gatorade Duel ====
Qualifying for the front row of the 2007 Daytona 500 took place on February 11. Robert Yates Racing swept the front row with the No. 38 Ford Fusion of David Gilliland winning the pole and the No. 88 of teammate Ricky Rudd finishing second.

Rule-breaking tactics, however, swirled around the qualifying. Five teams were slapped with suspensions, fines and points deductions for illegal modifications. The hardest hit was Michael Waltrip, whose No. 55 team was the most harshly punished, having their race director and crew chief suspended indefinitely, fined US$100,000 and the docking of 100 owners and drivers points for a gelatin-like substance found in the Inlet manifold during inspections before the qualifying, and in a replacement manifold after qualifying. The substance was revealed by NASCAR, during the announcement of the penalties, to be an unspecified oxygenate compound that was blended with the fuel, possibly in an attempt to defeat the effect of the restrictor plate. Waltrip fired said crew chief for the unauthorized change that neither he or anyone else authorized. The No. 17 Matt Kenseth team of Roush Racing and the No. 9 Kasey Kahne team from Evernham Motorsports had their crew chiefs suspended for the first four races, fined US$50,000 and had 50 driver and owner points taken away for illegal modifications discovered in post-qualifying inspections. All three teams also had their qualifying times for the pole positions disqualified, and Waltrip's original car was impounded by NASCAR, forcing him to go to a back-up auto for the first qualifying race.

Additionally, two other Evernham teams – the No. 10 of Scott Riggs and the No. 19 of Elliott Sadler – had their crew chiefs suspended for the first two races of the season, slapped with US$25,000 fines and deductions of 25 owner and driver points. Unlike the other three teams, their times were allowed to stand and kept their starting positions for the qualifying doubleheader as those violations were found in pre-qualifying inspections.

Another story during Speedweeks was that 1966 Rookie of the Year James Hylton would attempt to make his first cup race since 1993 in a car prepared by Richard Childress Racing.

Gilliland sat on the pole for the first of the Gatorade Duel races on February 15, which establishes the starting order for the Super Bowl of NASCAR Racing, while Rudd was on the point for the second race, which both aired on Speed as part of the new NASCAR TV package.

==== The race ====
The race was hotly contested by many, with many stories abound. From Toyota attempting to emotionally rebound after Michael Waltrip's loss of not only his crew chief and VP of Competition, but also losing 100 driver and owner points. Other stories were Jeff Gordon's disqualification after winning his Gatorade Duel, and Tony Stewart's Speedweeks domination, attempting to win the Bud Shootout, the Duel, and the Daytona 500. The first few laps were incident free except for a spin by road racing veteran Boris Said. The race was dominated by Tony Stewart and Kurt Busch. Both combined for a total of 130 of 200 laps. However, with just under a quarter of the laps to go, Tony got loose in Turn 4 while Busch was unable to avoid Stewart and turned him into the wall in a crash that looked like the one that killed Dale Earnhardt in 2001, exactly six years to that date. From that point on, it was a game of survival of the fastest as defending race winner Jimmie Johnson, outside polesitter Ricky Rudd, and fan favorite Dale Earnhardt Jr. were taken out in incidents throughout the day. A red flag was brought out in a crash involving Jamie McMurray, Rudd, and Junior. At the time of the flag, Mark Martin, who had not won the Great American Race in 22 tries, was in the lead with his ex-teammates behind him. On the restart, everyone attempted to pass Mark on the low line, but he successfully blocked. However, charging up the outside was Kevin Harvick who came from 8th with half a lap to go to take the lead heading into the fourth turn. However, the Big One would finally occur on the last lap as Kyle Busch hit the apron and spun, causing a chain reaction crash. Despite the incidents, NASCAR officials did not freeze the field and let Harvick and Martin duke it out in the last hundred yards. In one of the closest 500s since the inaugural in 1959, Kevin Harvick passed Mark Martin to the stripe by 0.020 seconds, becoming the 31st different winner of the Great American Race.

Top ten results (202 laps/505 miles due to green–white–checkered rule)					Failed to qualify	
Pos.	No.	Driver	Car	Team	Duel race No. 1:	Duel race No. 2:
1	29	Kevin Harvick	Chevrolet	Richard Childress Racing	4- Ward Burton	04- Eric McClure
2	01	Mark Martin	Chevrolet	Ginn Racing	30- Stanton Barrett	15- Paul Menard
3	31	Jeff Burton	Chevrolet	Richard Childress Racing	36- Jeremy Mayfield	23- Mike Skinner
4	09	Mike Wallace	Chevrolet	Phoenix Racing	37- Bill Elliott	27- Kirk Shelmerdine
5	6	David Ragan (R)	Ford	Roush Fenway Racing	49- Mike Bliss	34- Kevin Lepage
6	19	Elliott Sadler	Dodge	Evernham Motorsports	58- James Hylton	39- Regan Smith
7	9	Kasey Kahne	Dodge	Evernham Motorsports	72- Brandon Whitt	71- Frank Kimmel
8	38	David Gilliland	Ford	Robert Yates Racing	78- Kenny Wallace	74- Derrike Cope
9	13	Joe Nemechek	Chevrolet	Ginn Racing	84- A. J. Allmendinger	83- Brian Vickers
10	24	Jeff Gordon	Chevrolet	Hendrick Motorsports		

=== Auto Club 500 ===
The Auto Club 500, NASCAR's second points race of the season, and what many people consider "the first real race of the season" (without the restrictor plates run at Daytona) was held at California Speedway on February 25. This race was the first run in Nextel Cup series history with unleaded gasoline, as all three major series began running Sunoco 260 GT Plus, a 104-octane (R+M/2) unleaded racing fuel, starting with this race. Jeff Gordon won his first pole of the season. Matt Kenseth swept the Busch and Cup Series races at Fontana, and Toyota gained its first top-10 in the Nextel Cup Series.

Top ten results					Failed to qualify
Pos.	No.	Driver	Car	Team	Failed to qualify
1.	17	Matt Kenseth	Ford	Roush Fenway Racing	4- Ward Burton
2.	24	Jeff Gordon	Chevrolet	Hendrick Motorsports	34- Kevin Lepage
3.	48	Jimmie Johnson	Chevrolet	Hendrick Motorsports	36- Jeremy Mayfield
4.	31	Jeff Burton	Chevrolet	Richard Childress Racing	49- Mike Bliss
5.	01	Mark Martin	Chevrolet	Ginn Racing	55- Michael Waltrip
6.	07	Clint Bowyer	Chevrolet	Richard Childress Racing	72- Brandon Whitt
7.	2	Kurt Busch	Dodge	Penske Racing South	78- Kenny Wallace
8.	20	Tony Stewart	Chevrolet	Joe Gibbs Racing	84- A. J. Allmendinger
9.	5	Kyle Busch	Chevrolet	Hendrick Motorsports	
10.	83	Brian Vickers	Toyota	Team Red Bull	
Regan Smith was to have qualified in the No. 39 car, but the car was withdrawn prior to qualifying.

=== UAW-DaimlerChrysler 400 ===
The UAW-DaimlerChrysler 400, NASCAR's third race of the season, was held at the newly refurbished Las Vegas Motor Speedway on March 11. Kasey Kahne won the pole. This would be the final race with the UAW-DaimlerChrysler name; starting in 2008 after Daimler Benz sold off Chrysler, the race would be renamed the UAW-Dodge 400. This race marked the first time since the 1965 Firecracker 400 that the top 10 starters finished outside the top 10.

Top ten results					Failed to qualify
Pos.	No.	Driver	Car	Team	Failed to qualify
1.	48	Jimmie Johnson	Chevrolet	Hendrick Motorsports	72- Brandon Whitt
2.	24	Jeff Gordon	Chevrolet	Hendrick Motorsports	55- Michael Waltrip
3.	11	Denny Hamlin	Chevrolet	Joe Gibbs Racing	49- Mike Bliss
4.	17	Matt Kenseth	Ford	Roush Fenway Racing	47- Ken Schrader
5.	01	Mark Martin	Chevrolet	Ginn Racing	37- John Andretti
6.	99	Carl Edwards	Ford	Roush Fenway Racing	36- Jeremy Mayfield
7.	20	Tony Stewart	Chevrolet	Joe Gibbs Racing	34- Kevin Lepage
8.	12	Ryan Newman	Dodge	Penske Racing South	00- David Reutimann
9.	5	Kyle Busch	Chevrolet	Hendrick Motorsports	83- Brian Vickers
10.	26	Jamie McMurray	Ford	Roush Fenway Racing	84- A. J. Allmendinger

=== Kobalt Tools 500 ===
The fourth race of the season, the Kobalt Tools 500, was held at Atlanta Motor Speedway on March 18. Ryan Newman won the pole, his seventh at Atlanta, but started 43rd after blowing an engine in Saturday practice.

Top ten results					Failed to qualify
Pos.	No.	Driver	Car	Team	Failed to qualify
1.	48	Jimmie Johnson	Chevrolet	Hendrick Motorsports	4- Ward Burton
2.	20	Tony Stewart	Chevrolet	Joe Gibbs Racing	33- Scott Wimmer
3.	17	Matt Kenseth	Ford	Roush Fenway Racing	34- Kevin Lepage
4.	31	Jeff Burton	Chevrolet	Richard Childress Racing	36- Jeremy Mayfield
5.	42	Juan Pablo Montoya (R)	Dodge	Chip Ganassi Racing	37- John Andretti
6.	07	Clint Bowyer	Chevrolet	Richard Childress Racing	55- Michael Waltrip
7.	99	Carl Edwards	Ford	Roush Fenway Racing	78- Kenny Wallace
8.	1	Martin Truex Jr.	Chevrolet	Dale Earnhardt, Inc.	84- A. J. Allmendinger
9.	41	Reed Sorenson	Dodge	Chip Ganassi Racing	
10.	01	Mark Martin	Chevrolet	Ginn Racing	

=== Food City 500 ===
The fifth race of the season, the Food City 500, was held at Bristol Motor Speedway on March 25. the last before the fabled high banks were repaved with new concrete for the August race under the lights with progressive banking.

Jeff Gordon won the first CoT Pole Position in NASCAR history, but this race was the first race without Joe Nemechek participating in five years as he failed to qualify on speed as his No. 13 Ginn Racing team missed the show. However, Jeremy Mayfield (Bill Davis Racing No. 36) and A. J. Allmendinger (Team Red Bull No. 84) both started their first race of the season.

Top ten results (504 laps/252 miles due to green–white–checkered rule)					Failed to qualify
Pos.	No.	Driver	Car	Team	Failed to qualify
1.	5	Kyle Busch	Chevrolet	Hendrick Motorsports	00- David Reutimann
2.	31	Jeff Burton	Chevrolet	Richard Childress Racing	13- Joe Nemechek
3.	24	Jeff Gordon	Chevrolet	Hendrick Motorsports	15- Paul Menard
4.	29	Kevin Harvick	Chevrolet	Richard Childress Racing	37- Kevin Lepage
5.	16	Greg Biffle	Ford	Roush Fenway Racing	55- Michael Waltrip
6.	66	Jeff Green	Chevrolet	Haas CNC Racing	70- Johnny Sauter
7.	8	Dale Earnhardt Jr.	Chevrolet	Dale Earnhardt, Inc.	
8.	07	Clint Bowyer	Chevrolet	Richard Childress Racing	
9.	26	Jamie McMurray	Ford	Roush Fenway Racing	
10.	25	Casey Mears	Chevrolet	Hendrick Motorsports	
This was the first race to feature the Car of Tomorrow.

=== Goody's Cool Orange 500 ===
The Goody's Cool Orange 500, the sixth race of the season was held at Martinsville Speedway on April 1, as this race was the second race to feature the Car of Tomorrow and the first of the season to use the 2007 owners' points to lock in the top 35 teams for qualification. Denny Hamlin won the pole for this race, and Jimmie Johnson was the race winner.

Top ten results					Failed to qualify
Pos.	No.	Driver	Car	Team	Failed to qualify
1.	48	Jimmie Johnson	Chevrolet	Hendrick Motorsports	Ward Burton (No. 4)
2.	24	Jeff Gordon	Chevrolet	Hendrick Motorsports	Paul Menard (No. 15)
3.	11	Denny Hamlin	Chevrolet	Joe Gibbs Racing	Kevin Lepage (No. 37)
4.	5	Kyle Busch	Chevrolet	Hendrick Motorsports	Michael Waltrip (No. 55)
5.	8	Dale Earnhardt Jr.	Chevrolet	Dale Earnhardt, Inc.	Kenny Wallace (No. 78)
6.	31	Jeff Burton	Chevrolet	Richard Childress Racing	Brian Vickers (No. 83)
7.	20	Tony Stewart	Chevrolet	Joe Gibbs Racing	
8.	10	Scott Riggs	Dodge	Evernham Motorsports	
9.	26	Jamie McMurray	Ford	Roush Fenway Racing	
10.	17	Matt Kenseth	Ford	Roush Fenway Racing	

=== Samsung 500 ===
The Samsung 500, the seventh race of the season was held at Texas Motor Speedway on April 15. Qualifying was cancelled due to a wild tornado outbreak and the field was set by current owners' points, as a result Jeff Gordon started from the pole. He finished a respectable fourth place, but the race was won on turn 2 of the final lap by Jeff Burton, who overtook Matt Kenseth for the lead in a classy finish.

Top ten results					Failed to qualify*
Pos.	No.	Driver	Car	Team	Failed to qualify*
1.	31	Jeff Burton	Chevrolet	Richard Childress Racing	David Reutimann (No. 00)
2.	17	Matt Kenseth	Ford	Roush Fenway Racing	Jeremy Mayfield (No. 36)
3.	01	Mark Martin	Chevrolet	Ginn Racing	John Andretti (No. 37)
4.	24	Jeff Gordon	Chevrolet	Hendrick Motorsports	A. J. Allmendinger (No. 84)
5.	26	Jamie McMurray	Ford	Roush Fenway Racing	Michael Waltrip (No. 55)
6.	16	Greg Biffle	Ford	Roush Fenway Racing	Ward Burton (No. 4)
7.	1	Martin Truex Jr.	Chevrolet	Dale Earnhardt, Inc.	Kevin Lepage (No. 34)
8.	42	Juan Pablo Montoya (R)	Dodge	Chip Ganassi Racing	Scott Wimmer (No. 33)
9.	11	Denny Hamlin	Chevrolet	Joe Gibbs Racing	
10.	40	David Stremme	Dodge	Chip Ganassi Racing	
*Failed to make the race as qualifying was cancelled due to rain

=== Subway Fresh Fit 500 ===
The eighth race of the season, the Subway Fresh Fit 500, was held at Phoenix International Raceway on April 21. This was the third race to feature the Car of Tomorrow, as well as the season's first night race. Jeff Gordon captured his third pole of the season, tying him for fourth on the all-time poles list with Darrell Waltrip. Near the end of the race, he pulled away from Tony Stewart, winning the race and tying Dale Earnhardt's 76 wins. In the eyes of his son, Jeff Gordon pulled a class act and drove a "Polish Victory Lap" with the flag of his father's famous No. 3, but fans of "The Intimidator" threw cans and bottles of beer on the track (mainly Earnhardt Jr.'s sponsor Budweiser), and were criticized by the driver of the No. 8 car in the post-race news conference. Tony Stewart, who was leading when Jeff Gordon passed him following a caution was so irate about the outcome (even going as far to criticize that NASCAR "fixed" races much like professional wrestling on his satellite radio show later that week) blew off the mandatory appearance at the post-race media session, and was fined US$10,000 for doing so.

Top ten results					Failed to qualify
Pos.	No.	Driver	Car	Team	Failed to qualify
1.	24	Jeff Gordon	Chevrolet	Hendrick Motorsports	Jeremy Mayfield (No. 36)
2.	20	Tony Stewart	Chevrolet	Joe Gibbs Racing	Michael Waltrip (No. 55)
3.	11	Denny Hamlin	Chevrolet	Joe Gibbs Racing	John Andretti (No. 37)
4.	48	Jimmie Johnson	Chevrolet	Hendrick Motorsports	Brian Vickers (No. 83)
5.	17	Matt Kenseth	Ford	Roush Fenway Racing	A. J. Allmendinger (No. 84)
6.	66	Jeff Green	Chevrolet	Haas CNC Racing	Mike Bliss (No. 49)
7.	5	Kyle Busch	Chevrolet	Hendrick Motorsports	Brandon Ash (No. 02)
8.	43	Bobby Labonte	Dodge	Petty Enterprises	
9.	70	Johnny Sauter	Chevrolet	Haas CNC Racing	
10.	29	Kevin Harvick	Chevrolet	Richard Childress Racing	
This was Jeff Gordon's first win at PIR. The only track he failed to win at is Kentucky, where he finished 7th at his last race there in 2015.

=== Aaron's 499 ===
The Aaron's 499, the ninth race of the season, was held at Talladega Superspeedway on April 29.

Top ten results					Failed to qualify
Pos.	No.	Driver	Car	Team	Failed to qualify
1.	24	Jeff Gordon	Chevrolet	Hendrick Motorsports	Michael Waltrip (No. 55)
2.	48	Jimmie Johnson	Chevrolet	Hendrick Motorsports	Brian Vickers (No. 83)
3.	2	Kurt Busch	Dodge	Penske Racing	Dave Blaney (No. 22)
4.	38	David Gilliland	Ford	Robert Yates Racing	A. J. Allmendinger (No. 84)
5.	26	Jamie McMurray	Ford	Roush Fenway Racing	Ken Schrader (No. 21)
6.	29	Kevin Harvick	Chevrolet	Richard Childress Racing	Mike Wallace (No. 09)
7.	8	Dale Earnhardt Jr.	Chevrolet	Dale Earnhardt, Inc.	Kevin Lepage (No. 34)
8.	40	David Stremme	Dodge	Chip Ganassi Racing	John Andretti (No. 37)
9.	12	Ryan Newman	Dodge	Penske Racing	Mike Bliss (No. 49)
10.	1	Martin Truex Jr.	Chevrolet	Dale Earnhardt, Inc.	

=== Crown Royal presents the Jim Stewart 400 ===
The tenth race of the season, the Crown Royal presents the Jim Stewart 400, was scheduled to be held at Richmond International Raceway on May 5. This was the fourth race to feature the Car of Tomorrow. The race was named after Jim Stewart of Houma, Louisiana who won an essay contest during the festivities leading up to the Daytona 500 sponsored by Crown Royal. The contest was so popular, it was repeated for the next four races at the track. Jeff Gordon captured his third straight pole by .01-second over second-place qualifier Carl Edwards. Dale Jarrett failed to qualify and missed his first Nextel Cup Race since the 1994 fall race at North Wilkesboro Speedway.

Top ten results					Failed to qualify
Pos.	No.	Driver	Car	Team	Failed to qualify
1.	48	Jimmie Johnson	Chevrolet	Hendrick Motorsports	Brian Vickers (No. 83)
2.	5	Kyle Busch	Chevrolet	Hendrick Motorsports	Michael Waltrip (No. 55)
3.	11	Denny Hamlin	Chevrolet	Joe Gibbs Racing	Jeremy Mayfield (No. 36)
4.	24	Jeff Gordon	Chevrolet	Hendrick Motorsports	Ken Schrader (No. 21)
5.	2	Kurt Busch	Dodge	Penske Racing	Dale Jarrett (No. 44)
6.	12	Ryan Newman	Dodge	Penske Racing	Kevin Lepage (No. 37)
7.	29	Kevin Harvick	Chevrolet	Richard Childress Racing	Mike Bliss (No. 49)
8.	20	Tony Stewart	Chevrolet	Joe Gibbs Racing	
9.	07	Clint Bowyer	Chevrolet	Richard Childress Racing	
10.	17	Matt Kenseth	Ford	Roush Fenway Racing	
The race was postponed to May 6 due to rain.

=== Dodge Avenger 500 ===
The Dodge Avenger 500, NASCAR's eleventh race of the season, was held at Darlington Raceway on May 13. This was the fifth race to feature the Car of Tomorrow. Clint Bowyer won his first career pole when he earned the pole position in qualifying.

The race marked the 50th anniversary of the first Rebel 300, run on Confederate Memorial Day weekend. Ironically, like the inaugural Rebel exactly 50 years to the date of the rescheduled date, the 51st running of the "Rebel" was postponed because of rain itself. Unlike 1957, when Darlington Raceway president Bob Colvin was fined for racing on Sunday, a violation of South Carolina Blue laws at that time, current regulations permit Sunday racing provided (1) the race was scheduled for greater than 250 miles or (2) if the race start was later than 1:30 pm. The 501.367-mile distance made the race legal on Sunday.

(The September 1983 Busch Series race at Darlington, held on a Sunday as the Southern 500 was held on Monday, was 250 miles because of the law. All other races at the track have been 200 miles on Friday or Saturday.)

Despite radiator problems, Jeff Gordon won his second Rebel, his first since 1996, when it was a 400-mile race.

This was also the first daytime race at Darlington since the Carolina Dodge Dealers 400 in March 2004.

Top ten results					Failed to qualify
Pos.	No.	Driver	Car	Team	Failed to qualify
1.	24	Jeff Gordon	Chevrolet	Hendrick Motorsports	Ward Burton (No. 4)
2.	11	Denny Hamlin	Chevrolet	Joe Gibbs Racing	Scott Riggs (No. 10)
3.	48	Jimmie Johnson	Chevrolet	Hendrick Motorsports	Jeremy Mayfield (No. 36)
4.	12	Ryan Newman	Dodge	Penske Racing	Dale Jarrett (No. 44)
5.	99	Carl Edwards	Ford	Roush Fenway Racing	Mike Bliss (No. 49)
6.	20	Tony Stewart	Chevrolet	Joe Gibbs Racing	Michael Waltrip (No. 55)
7.	17	Matt Kenseth	Ford	Roush Fenway Racing	
8.	8	Dale Earnhardt Jr.*	Chevrolet	Dale Earnhardt, Inc.	
9.	07	Clint Bowyer	Chevrolet	Richard Childress Racing	
10.	31	Jeff Burton	Chevrolet	Richard Childress Racing	
Rain forced the scheduled race date (May 12) to be postponed to the following afternoon.
*Following the race, Dale Earnhardt Jr. had been docked 100 drivers points, his owner/stepmother, Teresa Earnhardt had 100 owners points taken away from the No. 8 team and was fined US$100,000 and crew chief Tony Eury Jr. was suspended until July 4 for illegal bolts on the wing of the Chevy Impala Car of Tomorrow.

=== NASCAR Nextel All-Star Challenge ===
The 23rd annual Nextel Open and All-Star Challenge, the second and final non-points event of the season, was held at Lowe's Motor Speedway on May 19. in the first rule changes since the "Survivor" theme was eliminated from the event (then known as The Winston) after the 2003 season. Matt Kenseth earned the pole for the main event, while Martin Truex Jr. and Johnny Sauter overtook a fading pole sitter Carl Edwards to win the Nextel Open, and Kenny Wallace (a/k/a "Herman the German") voted in by the fans, but it was Kevin Harvick in the end winning the final quarter over defending champion Jimmie Johnson and the US$1 million first prize.

Top ten results
Pos.	No.	Driver	Car	Team
1	29	Kevin Harvick	Chevrolet	Richard Childress Racing
2	48	Jimmie Johnson	Chevrolet	Hendrick Motorsports
3	01	Mark Martin	Chevrolet	Ginn Racing
4	31	Jeff Burton	Chevrolet	Richard Childress Racing
5	20	Tony Stewart	Chevrolet	Joe Gibbs Racing
6	70	Johnny Sauter	Chevrolet	Haas CNC Racing
7	17	Matt Kenseth	Ford	Roush Fenway Racing
8	12	Ryan Newman	Dodge	Penske Racing South
9	8	Dale Earnhardt Jr.	Chevrolet	Dale Earnhardt Inc.
10	1	Martin Truex Jr.	Chevrolet	Dale Earnhardt Inc.
The 2008 race and all future races will be called the Sprint All-Star Race (edition in Roman numerals).
This was part of the new NASCAR television broadcast on Speed after six years on FX.
New formats were used for the All Star race, the Open and the Pit Crew Challenge.

=== Coca-Cola 600 ===
The Coca-Cola 600, NASCAR's twelfth Nextel Cup race of the season, was held at Lowe's Motor Speedway on May 27. This is the longest race run by the Cup Series (600 miles) and marks the official one-third mark of the season. Penske Racing South teammates Ryan Newman and Kurt Busch led a group of three Dodges to the green flag. One of the main factors of the 600 is not only the physical condition of the drivers, but the legend that Lowe's has of being an ever changing racetrack.

The "first phase" of the 600 was wild and crazy, with two cautions involving 21 cars in all. Fox commentator Darrell Waltrip even said that the race had a higher attrition rate than Bristol. The first wreck saw five-time Lowe's winner Jimmie Johnson lose his tire tread and start a multi-car pileup behind him. The second crash was more spectacular. The car of Tony Raines got loose and turned the car of Jeff Gordon into the grass. As Gordon came back across the track, the oncoming car of A. J. Allmendinger hit the right side door, jacking Gordon's car off the ground. Penske's dominance of the day would end in the night with a crash by Kurt Busch and a blown engine from Newman. Toyota, who had been struggling through the first third of the season, had only led a total of 15 laps. However, not only did both of Team Red Bull's cars make the race, but Brian Vickers carried the day for the manufacturer, leading 72 laps before power steering problems hit, but rallied for the marquee's first top five in Nextel Cup competition. Somehow, in the end, the longest race of the season would come down to who could go the longest on 18 3/4 gallons of fuel. Casey Mears, who had not won in 154 previous attempts, snapped his losing streak and joined teammate Jeff Gordon as well as Matt Kenseth, Bobby Labonte and David Pearson on the list of drivers who earned their first Cup win in the Coke 600. Mears went straight to Victory Lane after running out of fuel after crossing the finish line. The race also saw Kyle Petty earn his first top 5 since the MBNA 400 at Dover in 1997.

Top ten results					Failed to qualify
Pos.	No.	Driver	Car	Team	Failed to qualify
1.	25	Casey Mears	Chevrolet	Hendrick Motorsports	David Reutimann (No. 00)
2.	18	J. J. Yeley	Chevrolet	Joe Gibbs Racing	Ward Burton (No. 4)
3.	45	Kyle Petty	Dodge	Petty Enterprises	Paul Menard (No. 15)
4.	41	Reed Sorenson	Dodge	Chip Ganassi Racing	Kevin Lepage (No. 37)
5.	83	Brian Vickers	Toyota	Team Red Bull	Mike Bliss (No. 49)
6.	20	Tony Stewart	Chevrolet	Joe Gibbs Racing	Michael Waltrip (No. 55)
7.	88	Ricky Rudd	Ford	Robert Yates Racing	
8.	8	Dale Earnhardt Jr.	Chevrolet	Dale Earnhardt, Inc.	
9.	11	Denny Hamlin	Chevrolet	Joe Gibbs Racing	
10.	48	Jimmie Johnson	Chevrolet	Hendrick Motorsports	

=== Autism Speaks 400 presented by Visa ===
The Autism Speaks 400 presented by Visa, the thirteenth race of the season, was held at Dover International Speedway on June 4. Ryan Newman won his second consecutive pole. This was the sixth race to feature the Car of Tomorrow, as well as the last race broadcast by Fox in 2007. The race also served as the halfway mark for the battle for entry into the 2007 Chase for the Nextel Cup. This race also marked the first time since Daytona that Michael Waltrip raced on Sunday, or because of the rainout, a Monday. In a twist of irony, Waltrip's teammate, David Reutimann, who had out-qualified or bumped his boss from the field many times before, failed to qualify for his second consecutive race. Martin Truex Jr. won his first NASCAR Nextel Cup race, leading 216 of the 400 laps.

Top ten results					Failed to qualify
Pos.	No.	Driver	Car	Team	Failed to qualify
1.	1	Martin Truex Jr.	Chevrolet	Dale Earnhardt, Inc.	David Reutimann (No. 00)
2.	12	Ryan Newman	Dodge	Penske Racing South	Paul Menard (No. 15)
3.	99	Carl Edwards	Ford	Roush Fenway Racing	Dave Blaney (No. 22)
4.	11	Denny Hamlin	Chevrolet	Joe Gibbs Racing	Kevin Lepage (No. 37)
5.	17	Matt Kenseth	Ford	Roush Fenway Racing	Mike Bliss (No. 49)
6.	16	Greg Biffle	Ford	Roush Fenway Racing	Kenny Wallace (No. 78)
7.	01	Mark Martin	Chevrolet	Ginn Racing	
8.	07	Clint Bowyer	Chevrolet	Richard Childress Racing	
9.	24	Jeff Gordon	Chevrolet	Hendrick Motorsports	
10.	7	Robby Gordon	Ford	Robby Gordon Motorsports	
The race was also noted for the announcement during the race that Bill France Jr. peacefully passed on earlier that afternoon.
It was the last race of the season to be broadcast on Fox.
Race postponed to Monday due to rain.

=== Pocono 500 ===
The Pocono 500, the fourteenth race of the season, was held at Pocono Raceway on June 10. Ryan Newman earned his third consecutive Budweiser Pole Award. In a delayed and postponed at lap 106 race, Jeff Gordon won his third Pocono 500.

Top ten results					Failed to qualify
Pos.	No.	Driver	Car	Team	Failed to qualify
1.	24	Jeff Gordon	Chevrolet	Hendrick Motorsports	Jeremy Mayfield (No. 36)
2.	12	Ryan Newman	Dodge	Penske Racing	Kevin Lepage (No. 37)
3.	1	Martin Truex Jr.	Chevrolet	Dale Earnhardt Inc.	Dale Jarrett (No. 44)
4.	25	Casey Mears	Chevrolet	Hendrick Motorsports	Mike Bliss (No. 49)
5.	20	Tony Stewart	Chevrolet	Joe Gibbs Racing	Michael Waltrip (No. 55)
6.	11	Denny Hamlin	Chevrolet	Joe Gibbs Racing	Kenny Wallace (No. 78)
7.	01	Mark Martin	Chevrolet	Ginn Racing	
8.	5	Kyle Busch	Chevrolet	Hendrick Motorsports	
9.	17	Matt Kenseth	Ford	Roush Fenway Racing	
10.	07	Clint Bowyer	Chevrolet	Richard Childress Racing	
Race ended after 106 laps due to darkness and rain.
It was the first of six 2007 races broadcast by TNT.

=== Citizens Bank 400 ===
The Citizens Bank 400, the fifteenth race of the season, was held at Michigan International Speedway on June 17. J. J. Yeley won his first career pole, and Carl Edwards won his first race in 52 races. The race also saw Michael Waltrip, who has had a bad year since the Daytona qualifying fiasco, finish tenth in his No. 55 Toyota.

Top ten results					Failed to qualify
Pos.	No.	Driver	Car	Team	Failed to qualify
1.	99	Carl Edwards	Ford	Roush Fenway Racing	Ward Burton (No. 4)
2.	1	Martin Truex Jr.	Chevrolet	Dale Earnhardt, Inc.	Jeremy Mayfield (No. 36)
3.	20	Tony Stewart	Chevrolet	Joe Gibbs Racing	Kevin Lepage (No. 37)
4.	25	Casey Mears	Chevrolet	Hendrick Motorsports	Dale Jarrett (No. 44)
5.	8	Dale Earnhardt Jr.	Chevrolet	Dale Earnhardt, Inc.	Mike Bliss (No. 49)
6.	5	Kyle Busch	Chevrolet	Hendrick Motorsports	Kenny Wallace (No. 78)
7.	29	Kevin Harvick	Chevrolet	Richard Childress Racing	
8.	26	Jamie McMurray	Ford	Roush Fenway Racing	
9.	24	Jeff Gordon	Chevrolet	Hendrick Motorsports	
10.	55	Michael Waltrip	Toyota	Michael Waltrip Racing	

=== Toyota/Save Mart 350 ===
The Toyota/Save Mart 350, NASCAR's sixteenth race of the season was held at Infineon Raceway on June 24. This was the seventh race to feature the Car of Tomorrow, and the first road course race of 2007. For the first time in two years, Jamie McMurray won the pole position.

Much of the race was dominated by road course expert Robby Gordon, whose self-owned No. 7 Ford dominated the field, leading 48 laps. Robby hoped to win his first race since 2003 (also on a road course). However, through all the twists and turns, fuel mileage came into play after Joe Nemechek spun. Gordon's hopes were dashed when he was forced to make a pit stop for fuel. After his stop, the lead was given to McMurray, who had not won since 2002. However, McMurray would be chased by former-F1 driver Juan Pablo Montoya. Montoya passed McMurray (who was later forced to pit for a splash of fuel) with a few laps remaining and held off Daytona 500 winner Kevin Harvick to become the first Colombian born driver (and the third not to have been born in the USA) to win in a NASCAR Cup Series event. The win was even bigger for Montoya's car owner, Chip Ganassi who had struggled in previous years but would finally taste victory for the first time since 2002.

Top ten results					Failed to qualify	road course specialists	Regular drivers replaced
Pos.	No.	Driver	Car	Team	Failed to qualify	road course specialists	Regular drivers replaced
1.	42	Juan Pablo Montoya (R)	Dodge	Chip Ganassi Racing	Ward Burton (No. 4)	91 Marc Goossens	
2.	29	Kevin Harvick	Chevrolet	Richard Childress Racing	Brian Vickers (No. 83)	00 P. J. Jones	David Reutimann
3.	31	Jeff Burton	Chevrolet	Richard Childress Racing	A. J. Allmendinger (No. 84)	23* Butch Leitzinger	Jeremy Mayfield
4.	07	Clint Bowyer	Chevrolet	Richard Childress Racing	Kenny Wallace (No. 78)	60 Boris Said	
5.	16	Greg Biffle	Ford	Roush Fenway Racing	Scott Riggs (No. 10)	37 Brian Simo	Kevin Lepage
6.	20	Tony Stewart	Chevrolet	Joe Gibbs Racing	Klaus Graf (No. 49)	49 Klaus Graf	Mike Bliss
7.	24	Jeff Gordon	Chevrolet	Hendrick Motorsports	Brandon Ash (No. 02)	55 Terry Labonte	Michael Waltrip
8.	5	Kyle Busch	Chevrolet	Hendrick Motorsports	Brian Simo (No. 37)	96 Ron Fellows	Tony Raines
9.	60	Boris Said	Ford	No Fear Racing	Paul Menard (No. 15)	01 Regan Smith	Mark Martin
10.	11	Denny Hamlin	Chevrolet	Joe Gibbs Racing			
*entered as 23
Failing inspections on Friday, Jeff Gordon and Jimmie Johnson were not allowed on the track that day, including for qualifying. As a result, they were placed 41st and 42nd respectively in the starting lineup, and two days following the race, both drivers were penalized 100 owner and driver points, fined US$100,000 and had their crew chiefs (Chad Knaus for Johnson and Steve Letarte for Jeff Gordon) suspended for six races (until August 15) and placed on probation until the end of the 2007 calendar year.

=== Lenox Industrial Tools 300 ===
The Lenox Industrial Tools 300, the seventeenth race of the season and the eighth to feature the Car of Tomorrow, was held at New Hampshire International Speedway on July 1. Dave Blaney won the pole, his second career pole and the first for Toyota in Nextel Cup.

Top ten results					Failed to qualify
Pos.	No.	Driver	Car	Team	Failed to qualify
1.	11	Denny Hamlin	Chevrolet	Joe Gibbs Racing	Michael Waltrip (No. 55)
2.	24	Jeff Gordon	Chevrolet	Hendrick Motorsports	Chad Chaffin (No. 49)*
3.	1	Martin Truex Jr.	Chevrolet	Dale Earnhardt, Inc.	A. J. Allmendinger (No. 84)
4.	8	Dale Earnhardt Jr.	Chevrolet	Dale Earnhardt, Inc.	Kenny Wallace (No. 78)
5.	48	Jimmie Johnson	Chevrolet	Hendrick Motorsports	Scott Riggs (No. 10)
6.	66	Jeff Green	Chevrolet	Haas CNC Racing	Dale Jarrett (No. 44)
7.	31	Jeff Burton	Chevrolet	Richard Childress Racing	
8.	29	Kevin Harvick	Chevrolet	Richard Childress Racing	
9.	17	Matt Kenseth	Ford	Roush Fenway Racing	
10.	12	Ryan Newman	Dodge	Penske Racing	
Shortly after qualifying, the No. 83 Red Bull Toyota driven by Brian Vickers was disqualified in post-qualifying inspection for being too low in the front valence and its qualifying time was disallowed. Chaffin took Vickers' place in the starting lineup.
Following the race, the cars of Kyle Busch and Johnny Sauter were found to also be too low in post-race inspection. NASCAR confiscated the cars and penalized both teams 25 driver & owner points, fined each crew chief US$25,000 and placed their respective crew chiefs on probation until Sep 19, after the next New Hampshire race.

=== Pepsi 400 ===
The Pepsi 400, NASCAR's eighteenth Nextel Cup race of the season, was held at Daytona International Speedway on July 7. The race officially marked the halfway point of the season. Coverage on TNT featured limited interruptions in a "wide open" production. In addition, this race was the last time the race was called the Pepsi 400, ending a 21-year sponsorship. Coca-Cola will gradually take over pouring rights at all ISC-owned tracks starting with the Daytona Speedweeks events in February 2008, and as a result, the race will be renamed the Coke Zero 400.

The biggest news to come out of this race was qualifying. Boris Said in the No. 60 Ford was the fastest, but a rainstorm stopped the process, and under NASCAR rules, all cars must make a qualifying attempt before it is made official. Six other cars not in the top 35 in owners' points were following Said, but Jeff Gordon would be on the pole as time trials were rained out, and the field was set by the NASCAR rulebook based on owner points. Said would end up not even making the race because of this.

The race itself featured many twists and turns. Tony Stewart, Denny Hamlin, and Dale Earnhardt Jr., some of the race favorites, were taken out early in a wreck. Eventually, Jamie McMurray, suffering a 166 race winless slump (since October 2002 at Lowe's Motor Speedway), overcame a black flag penalty in the race and broke through to record his second career victory by only .005 seconds over Kyle Busch, becoming tied for the second-closest finish in NASCAR history, the closest coming in 2003 when Ricky Craven edged Kurt Busch at Darlington Raceway by .002 seconds.

Top ten results					Failed to qualify*
Pos.	No.	Driver	Car	Team	Failed to qualify*
1.	26	Jamie McMurray	Ford	Roush Fenway Racing	Jeremy Mayfield (No. 36)
2.	5	Kyle Busch	Chevrolet	Hendrick Motorsports	A. J. Allmendinger (No. 84)
3.	2	Kurt Busch	Dodge	Penske Racing	Larry Foyt (No. 49)
4.	99	Carl Edwards	Ford	Roush Fenway Racing	Michael Waltrip (No. 55)
5.	24	Jeff Gordon	Chevrolet	Hendrick Motorsports	Kevin Lepage (No. 37)
6.	16	Greg Biffle	Ford	Roush Fenway Racing	Ward Burton (No. 4)
7.	07	Clint Bowyer	Chevrolet	Richard Childress Racing	Boris Said (No. 60)
8.	17	Matt Kenseth	Ford	Roush Fenway Racing	Mike Wallace (No. 09)
9.	9	Kasey Kahne	Dodge	Evernham Motorsports	Eric McClure (No. 04)
10.	48	Jimmie Johnson	Chevrolet	Hendrick Motorsports	Kirk Shelmerdine (No. 27)
The final time the old car template, with restrictor plate rules were run on a superspeedway.
*Failed to make the race after rain set the field under owner's points

=== USG Sheetrock 400 ===
The USG Sheetrock 400, NASCAR's nineteenth race of the season was held at Chicagoland Speedway on July 15. Casey Mears won the pole. Of note, John Andretti, subbing for Kyle Petty who is currently in the TNT booth, qualified a surprise 9th, and Michael Waltrip made his fourth race of the season. Tony Stewart, who was in the midst of a 20-race winless streak and an altercation with teammate Denny Hamlin at Daytona, fended off challenges from Matt Kenseth and Jimmie Johnson to grab his first victory of the season. Additionally, on September 25, Chicagoland Speedway officials announced that starting in 2008, the event would become a Saturday night race.

Top ten results					Failed to qualify
Pos.	No.	Driver	Car	Team	Failed to qualify
1.	20	Tony Stewart	Chevrolet	Joe Gibbs Racing	Scott Riggs (No. 10)
2.	17	Matt Kenseth	Ford	Roush Fenway Racing	Kevin Lepage (No. 37)
3.	99	Carl Edwards	Ford	Roush Fenway Racing	Dale Jarrett (No. 44)
4.	29	Kevin Harvick	Chevrolet	Richard Childress Racing	Kenny Wallace (No. 78)
5.	25	Casey Mears	Chevrolet	Hendrick Motorsports	Brian Vickers (No. 83)
6.	2	Kurt Busch	Dodge	Penske Racing	A. J. Allmendinger (No. 84)
7.	31	Jeff Burton	Chevrolet	Richard Childress Racing	
8.	12	Ryan Newman	Dodge	Penske Racing	
9.	24	Jeff Gordon	Chevrolet	Hendrick Motorsports	
10.	07	Clint Bowyer	Chevrolet	Richard Childress Racing	
The last 2007 race to be broadcast by TNT.

=== Allstate 400 at the Brickyard ===
The Allstate 400 at the Brickyard, the twentieth Nextel Cup race of the season was held at Indianapolis Motor Speedway on July 29. It was the first Nextel Cup race to be broadcast by ESPN since the 2000 NASCAR season when they carried the NAPA 500 from Atlanta. Additionally, this was the first time the Indianapolis event is scheduled for cable; the previous thirteen runnings of the race were broadcast on network television, either on ABC or NBC. Petty Enterprises driver and owner Kyle Petty made his 800th career NNCS start at the Brickyard. For the second consecutive year, rain washed out the Friday practice sessions, so there was one practice session and qualifying on Saturday, with Reed Sorenson claiming his first career pole. In addition, Toyota scored another top ten, with driver Dave Blaney finishing ninth, the best Toyota result since Brian Vickers finished fifth during the Coca-Cola 600.

Top ten results					Failed to qualify
Pos.	No.	Driver	Car	Team	Failed to qualify
1.	20	Tony Stewart	Chevrolet	Joe Gibbs Racing	Joe Nemechek (No. 08)
2.	42	Juan Pablo Montoya (R)	Dodge	Chip Ganassi Racing	Jeremy Mayfield (No. 36)
3.	24	Jeff Gordon	Chevrolet	Hendrick Motorsports	Kevin Lepage (No. 37)
4.	5	Kyle Busch	Chevrolet	Hendrick Motorsports	Dale Jarrett (No. 44)
5.	41	Reed Sorenson	Dodge	Chip Ganassi Racing	Kenny Wallace (No. 78)
6.	01	Mark Martin	Chevrolet	Dale Earnhardt, Inc.	A. J. Allmendinger (No. 84)
7.	29	Kevin Harvick	Chevrolet	Richard Childress Racing	
8.	31	Jeff Burton	Chevrolet	Richard Childress Racing	
9.	22	Dave Blaney	Toyota	Bill Davis Racing	
10.	17	Matt Kenseth	Ford	Roush Fenway Racing	
Ginn Racing merged into Dale Earnhardt, Inc. The merger did not affect the DEI team name. The No. 01 (Mark Martin/Aric Almirola) team was added to the DEI teams. The No. 15 (Paul Menard) inherited the owner points from the former No. 14 (Sterling Marlin), which guaranteed a starting spot for Menard. The No. 13 (Joe Nemechek) team of Ginn Racing was disbanded. The No. 14 originally had Regan Smith driving after Sterling Marlin was released, but Ginn Racing merged into Dale Earnhardt, Inc. so Smith was left without a ride. Bobby Ginn was listed as the owner of the No. 01 and No. 15, Teresa Earnhardt was listed as the owner of the No. 1 and No. 8 both for the remainder of 2007. The shops of Ginn Racing housed the No. 15 and No. 01, The shops of DEI housed the No. 1 and No. 8 Fabrication work was to be done out of the Ginn Racing shops.
Following the race, in a post-race interview that aired on the Speedway Public Address System and on ESPN, Stewart said "This one's for every one of those fans in the stands that pull for me every week and take all the bullshit from everybody else." On July 31, Stewart was fined US$25,000 and both the driver and team owner Joe Gibbs were docked 25 points for violating NASCAR regulations regarding obscenities during a race broadcast.

=== Pennsylvania 500 ===
The Pennsylvania 500, the twenty-first NNCS race of the season, was held at Pocono Raceway on August 5. Dale Earnhardt Jr. won his first pole since 2002. Robby Gordon was taken out of the race by NASCAR officials after an incident in the Busch Series race in Montréal that led to his disqualification, and was replaced in the No. 7 car by P. J. Jones. The race was won by Kurt Busch, dominating by leading all but 25 of the 200 laps.

Top ten results					Failed to qualify
Pos.	No.	Driver	Car	Team	Failed to qualify
1.	2	Kurt Busch	Dodge	Penske Racing South	Mike Bliss (No. 49)
2.	8	Dale Earnhardt Jr.	Chevrolet	Dale Earnhardt, Inc.	Kevin Lepage (No. 37)
3.	11	Denny Hamlin	Chevrolet	Joe Gibbs Racing	Kenny Wallace (No. 78)
4.	24	Jeff Gordon*	Chevrolet	Hendrick Motorsports	A. J. Allmendinger (No. 84)
5.	48	Jimmie Johnson	Chevrolet	Hendrick Motorsports	
6.	20	Tony Stewart	Chevrolet	Joe Gibbs Racing	
7.	12	Ryan Newman	Dodge	Penske Racing South	
8.	07	Clint Bowyer	Chevrolet	Richard Childress Racing	
9.	01	Mark Martin	Chevrolet	Dale Earnhardt, Inc.	
10.	25	Casey Mears	Chevrolet	Hendrick Motorsports	
*Jeff Gordon became the first driver to clinch a spot in the 2007 Chase for the Nextel Cup.

=== Centurion Boats at The Glen ===
The twenty-second race of the season, the Centurion Boats at The Glen, was held at Watkins Glen International on August 12. This was the ninth race to feature the Car of Tomorrow, and was the second and final road course race of the season.

In the race, Jeff Gordon, who had been given the pole position due to the cancellation of qualifying due to rain, led the most laps, but Tony Stewart, who was in the lead when he spun out heading into turn one on Lap 45 of the 90-lap event, capitalized on the same error by Jeff Gordon with two laps remaining and wins his third race out of the last four. With his win, Stewart scored his 4th Watkins Glen victory, putting him in a tie with Jeff Gordon as the all-time NASCAR winner at the historical racetrack. In 2009 however, Stewart would pass Gordon as the all-time winner when he went on to win his 5th Watkins Glen race. As of 2020, that record still stands. Also with his win in that race, Tony Stewart scored his 6th career road course win, putting him in a 4-way tie for 2nd in all-time road course wins with Bobby Allison, Rusty Wallace, & Ricky Rudd. As of 2020 however, Tony Stewart is now in 2nd place with 8 road course wins, as Jeff Gordon currently holds the all-time record with 9 wins.

The race though was marred by an incident started by Martin Truex Jr. when he tapped Juan Pablo Montoya which chain reacted into Kevin Harvick and sent both Montoya and Harvick into a spin and a subsequent multi-car pileup which caused a red flag. Both Montoya and Harvick then got out of their cars and had a shoving match ending when Jeff Burton and officials separated the two drivers. Even though it was clear that Montoya was not at fault, Harvick blamed his accident on Montoya and threatened to "kick his ass." For that comment and his part in the feud, Kevin Harvick was put on indefinite probation by NASCAR because he violated the warning NASCAR gave him after intentionally crashing Scott Pruett at Montreal the previous week and later winning.

Top ten results					Failed to qualify*	road course specialists	Regular drivers replaced
Pos.	No.	Driver	Car	Team	Failed to qualify*	road course specialists	Regular drivers replaced
1.	20	Tony Stewart	Chevrolet	Joe Gibbs Racing	Marcos Ambrose (No. 77)	96 Ron Fellows	Tony Raines
2.	11	Denny Hamlin	Chevrolet	Joe Gibbs Racing	A. J. Allmendinger (No. 84)	00 P. J. Jones	David Reutimann
3.	48	Jimmie Johnson	Chevrolet	Hendrick Motorsports	Ward Burton (No. 4)	10 Patrick Carpentier	Scott Riggs
4.	96	Ron Fellows	Chevrolet	Hall of Fame Racing	Klaus Graf (No. 49)	37 Brian Simo	Kevin Lepage
5.	7	Robby Gordon	Ford	Robby Gordon Motorsports	Boris Said (No. 60)*	49 Klaus Graf	Mike Bliss
6.	1	Martin Truex Jr.	Chevrolet	Dale Earnhardt, Inc.	Brian Simo (No. 37)	55 Terry Labonte	Michael Waltrip
7.	5	Kyle Busch	Chevrolet	Hendrick Motorsports		01 Regan Smith	Mark Martin
8.	99	Carl Edwards	Ford	Roush Fenway Racing			
9.	24	Jeff Gordon	Chevrolet	Hendrick Motorsports			
10.	16	Greg Biffle	Ford	Roush Fenway Racing			
*It was announced on Saturday (August 11), that Said would replace Bill Elliott in the No. 21 Wood Brothers/JTG Racing Ford.
*Failed to make the race after rain canceled qualifying

=== 3M Performance 400 ===
The 3M Performance 400, the twenty-third race of the season was scheduled to be held at Michigan International Speedway on August 19. The race sponsor moved from the June race to the August race in 2007. Jeff Gordon earned his sixth pole of the season, edging out Greg Biffle in the last qualifying attempt of the day.

Top ten results					Failed to qualify
Pos.	No.	Driver	Car	Team	Failed to qualify
1.	2	Kurt Busch	Dodge	Penske Racing	Jeremy Mayfield (No. 36)
2.	1	Martin Truex Jr.	Chevrolet	Dale Earnhardt, Inc.	Dale Jarrett (No. 44)
3.	48	Jimmie Johnson	Chevrolet	Hendrick Motorsports	Scott Wimmer (No. 78)
4.	17	Matt Kenseth	Ford	Roush Fenway Racing	A. J. Allmendinger (No. 84)
5.	11	Denny Hamlin	Chevrolet	Joe Gibbs Racing	Kevin Lepage (No. 37)
6.	22	Dave Blaney	Toyota	Bill Davis Racing	
7.	99	Carl Edwards	Ford	Roush Fenway Racing	
8.	83	Brian Vickers	Toyota	Team Red Bull	
9.	43	Bobby Labonte	Dodge	Petty Enterprises	
10.	20	Tony Stewart	Chevrolet	Joe Gibbs Racing	
As a result of his fifth-place finish, Denny Hamlin became the second driver to clinch a position in the Chase for the Nextel Cup.
(Race extended to 406 miles due to green–white–checkered finish.)
Two days of rain forced the race to be postponed until the following Tuesday, August 21, marking the first Tuesday race in the modern (post-1971) NASCAR era since the 1978 Firecracker 400, which was always run on July 4 prior to moving the race to the first Saturday in July in 1988.

=== Sharpie 500 ===
The twenty-fourth race of the season, the Sharpie 500, was held at the repaved Bristol Motor Speedway on August 25. This was the tenth race to feature the Car of Tomorrow. In addition, this race was run on a reconfigured track where the infamous 36-degree high banks have been replaced by "progressively banked" turns between 24 and 30 degrees. Kasey Kahne won the pole. Carl Edwards won the race and held off Kahne, who led 305 laps, while Edwards led 182 laps, giving Ford their first CoT victory.

Top ten results					Failed to qualify
Pos.	No.	Driver	Car	Team	Failed to qualify
1.	99	Carl Edwards	Ford	Roush Fenway Racing	David Reutimann (No. 00)
2.	9	Kasey Kahne	Dodge	Gillett Evernham Motorsports	Sterling Marlin (No. 78)
3.	07	Clint Bowyer	Chevrolet	Richard Childress Racing	Brian Vickers (No. 83)
4.	20	Tony Stewart	Chevrolet	Joe Gibbs Racing	Kevin Lepage (No. 37)
5.	8	Dale Earnhardt Jr.	Chevrolet	Dale Earnhardt, Inc.	Stanton Barrett (No. 34)
6.	2	Kurt Busch	Dodge	Penske Racing	
7.	12	Ryan Newman	Dodge	Penske Racing	
8.	43	Bobby Labonte	Dodge	Petty Enterprises	
9.	5	Kyle Busch	Chevrolet	Hendrick Motorsports	
10.	16	Greg Biffle	Ford	Roush Fenway Racing	
In addition, by starting this race, Matt Kenseth clinched a spot in the Chase for the Nextel Cup. Edwards and Tony Stewart also wrapped up spots in the Chase with Edwards win and Stewart's 4th-place finish.

=== Sharp AQUOS 500 ===
The twenty-fifth race of the season, the Sharp AQUOS 500, was held at California Speedway on September 2. Kurt Busch won the pole. His brother, Kyle Busch, dominated the race for 97 of 250 laps. However, it was his teammate, El Cajon native Jimmie Johnson, who won the race.

Top ten results					Failed to qualify
Pos.	No.	Driver	Car	Team	Failed to qualify
1.	48	Jimmie Johnson	Chevrolet	Hendrick Motorsports	Ward Burton (No. 4)
2.	99	Carl Edwards	Ford	Roush Fenway Racing	Scott Riggs (No. 10)
3.	5	Kyle Busch	Chevrolet	Hendrick Motorsports	Dale Jarrett (No. 44)
4.	31	Jeff Burton	Chevrolet	Richard Childress Racing	
5.	8	Dale Earnhardt Jr.	Chevrolet	Dale Earnhardt, Inc.	
6.	1	Martin Truex Jr.	Chevrolet	Dale Earnhardt, Inc.	
7.	17	Matt Kenseth	Ford	Roush Fenway Racing	
8.	83	Brian Vickers	Toyota	Team Red Bull	
9.	2	Kurt Busch	Dodge	Penske Racing	
10.	9	Kasey Kahne	Dodge	Gillett Evernham Motorsports	
Jimmie Johnson assured himself the top spot in the Chase for the Nextel Cup also saw the Chase hopes of Ryan Newman and Greg Biffle vanish.
This was ESPN's final race telecast.

=== Chevy Rock & Roll 400 ===
The twenty-sixth and final race of the "regular" season, the Chevy Rock & Roll 400, was held at Richmond International Raceway on September 8. This was the eleventh race to feature the Car of Tomorrow. Jimmie Johnson won the pole and the race. It was his sixth victory of the year, which meant that he starts the Chase at the top of the points. Bobby Labonte made his 500th career start.

Top ten results					Failed to qualify
Pos.	No.	Driver	Car	Team	Failed to qualify
1	48	Jimmie Johnson	Chevrolet	Hendrick Motorsports	Ward Burton (No. 4)
2	20	Tony Stewart	Chevrolet	Joe Gibbs Racing	Jeremy Mayfield (No. 36)
3	6	David Ragan (R)	Ford	Roush Fenway Racing	Kevin Lepage (No. 37)
4	24	Jeff Gordon	Chevrolet	Hendrick Motorsports	Michael Waltrip (No. 55)
5	70	Johnny Sauter	Chevrolet	Haas CNC Racing	
6	11	Denny Hamlin	Chevrolet	Joe Gibbs Racing	
7	29	Kevin Harvick	Chevrolet	Richard Childress Racing	
8	9	Kasey Kahne	Dodge	Gillett Evernham Motorsports	
9	2	Kurt Busch	Dodge	Penske Racing	
10	18	J. J. Yeley	Chevrolet	Joe Gibbs Racing	
The first race to be broadcast on ABC.
The last race determining the twelve drivers who will be in the 2007 Chase for the Nextel Cup.
Chevrolet clinched their 31st Manufacturer's Championship with this race.

== Chase for the Nextel Cup ==
All ten of the races in the 2007 Chase for the Nextel Cup were broadcast on ABC. The ten races were evenly split between the regular stock car and the Car of Tomorrow, with the CoT running at New Hampshire, Dover, Talladega, Martinsville and Phoenix.

=== Sylvania 300 ===
The first race of the 2007 Chase for the Nextel Cup, the Sylvania 300, was held at New Hampshire International Speedway on September 16. This was the twelfth race to feature the Car of Tomorrow. Clint Bowyer won the pole and entered the Chase as the only driver without a win. However, he would dominate the field, leading for 222 of 300 laps en route to his first career victory in 64 starts.

All 43 cars that started the race were running at the finish, the first time since North Wilkesboro in 1996 that every car starting the race finished.

Top ten results					Failed to qualify
Pos.	No.	Driver	Car	Team	Failed to qualify
1.	07	**Clint Bowyer**	Chevrolet	Richard Childress Racing	Sam Hornish Jr. (No. 06)
2.	24	**Jeff Gordon**	Chevrolet	Hendrick Motorsports	Jeremy Mayfield (No. 36)
3.	20	**Tony Stewart**	Chevrolet	Joe Gibbs Racing	Kevin Lepage (No. 37)
4.	5	**Kyle Busch**	Chevrolet	Hendrick Motorsports	Dale Jarrett (No. 44)
5.	1	**Martin Truex Jr.**	Chevrolet	Dale Earnhardt, Inc.	Michael Waltrip (No. 55)
6.	48	**Jimmie Johnson**	Chevrolet	Hendrick Motorsports	Boris Said (No. 98)*
7.	17	**Matt Kenseth**	Ford	Roush Fenway Racing	
8.	25	Casey Mears	Chevrolet	Hendrick Motorsports	
9.	12	Ryan Newman	Dodge	Penske Racing	
10.	18	J. J. Yeley	Chevrolet	Joe Gibbs Racing	
John Andretti (No. 49) had qualified, but failed post-qualifying inspection, and his starting spot was given to Said.
' Chase drivers are in bold italics

=== Dodge Dealers 400 ===
The second race of the 2007 Chase was the Dodge Dealers 400, which was held at Dover International Speedway on September 23. This was the thirteenth race to feature the Car of Tomorrow. Jimmie Johnson won his second pole of the season. Carl Edwards scored his third win of the season.

Top ten results					Failed to qualify
Pos.	No.	Driver	Car	Team	Failed to qualify
1.	99	**Carl Edwards***	Ford	Roush Fenway Racing	Ward Burton (No. 4)
2.	16	Greg Biffle	Ford	Roush Fenway Racing	Scott Wimmer (No. 33)
3.	8	Dale Earnhardt Jr.	Chevrolet	Dale Earnhardt, Inc.	Sam Hornish Jr. (No. 06)
4.	01	Mark Martin	Chevrolet	Dale Earnhardt, Inc.	Kevin Lepage (No. 37)
5.	5	**Kyle Busch**	Chevrolet	Hendrick Motorsports	Dave Blaney (No. 22)
6.	25	Casey Mears	Chevrolet	Hendrick Motorsports	Jeremy Mayfield (No. 36)
7.	31	**Jeff Burton**	Chevrolet	Richard Childress Racing	
8.	26	Jamie McMurray	Ford	Roush Fenway Racing	
9.	20	**Tony Stewart**	Chevrolet	Joe Gibbs Racing	
10.	42	Juan Pablo Montoya **(R)**	Dodge	Chip Ganassi Racing	
Chase drivers are in bold italics
*The right rear fender of Carl Edwards' car was found to be too low. He was penalized 25 points, which dropped him from 3rd place to 6th place in the Drivers' Championship standings.

=== LifeLock 400 ===
The third race of the 2007 Chase was the LifeLock 400, and was held at Kansas Speedway on September 30. Jimmie Johnson won the pole. For the second consecutive race, due to a crash in happy hour Jimmie had to start in the 43rd position, half of the Chase drivers struggled. Jeff Burton was sent to the "back of the longest line" for a rule violation during the first red flag for rain when he pulled on the right front fender, in a repeat of Fendergate, as NASCAR prohibits working on the cars during the red flag. Greg Biffle won the race after two rain delays shortened the event to 210 laps.

Top ten results					Failed to qualify
Pos.	No.	Driver	Car	Team	Failed to qualify
1.	16	Greg Biffle	Ford	Roush Fenway Racing	A. J. Allmendinger (No. 84)
2.	07	**Clint Bowyer**	Chevrolet	Richard Childress Racing	Brian Vickers (No. 83)
3.	48	**Jimmie Johnson**	Chevrolet	Hendrick Motorsports	Jon Wood (No. 47)
4.	25	Casey Mears	Chevrolet	Hendrick Motorsports	Ward Burton (No. 4)
5.	24	**Jeff Gordon**	Chevrolet	Hendrick Motorsports	
6.	29	**Kevin Harvick**	Chevrolet	Richard Childress Racing	
7.	41	Reed Sorenson	Dodge	Chip Ganassi Racing	
8.	19	Elliott Sadler	Dodge	Gillett Evernham Motorsports	
9.	9	Kasey Kahne	Dodge	Gillett Evernham Motorsports	
10.	8	Dale Earnhardt Jr.	Chevrolet	Dale Earnhardt, Inc.	
Chase drivers are in bold italics
Race shortened to 210 laps due to rain and darkness

=== UAW-Ford 500 ===
The fourth race of the 2007 Chase, the UAW-Ford 500, was held at Talladega Superspeedway on October 7. This was the fourteenth race to feature the Car of Tomorrow, but it was the first to use them with restrictor plates. Also, gear restrictions, which have not been used at restrictor plate races, but have been in use at other races since 2005, was also used for the first time at the track. Michael Waltrip won the pole, the second one for Toyota this season. Seven of the top ten cars were Toyotas. Jacques Villeneuve made his debut, while Sam Hornish Jr. went home again. In fact, the top eight speeds were from "go or go home" teams, as the next three highest speeds were locked out of the race by other teams that were not locked into the top 35 teams in the owners' points.

Jeff Gordon earned his 80th career victory and the points lead with a last lap charge on teammate Jimmie Johnson, sweeping both Talladega races of the season and bringing his total victories at the track to six. Third-placed Dave Blaney gave Toyota their best finish of the season to date. This would be the last race to be raced under the UAW-Ford 500 banner. Starting in 2008, the race would be known as the AMP Energy 500.

Top ten results					Failed to qualify
Pos.	No.	Driver	Car	Team	Failed to qualify
1.	24	**Jeff Gordon**	Chevrolet	Hendrick Motorsports	Ward Burton (No. 4)
2.	48	**Jimmie Johnson**	Chevrolet	Hendrick Motorsports	Sam Hornish Jr. (No. 06)
3.	22	Dave Blaney	Toyota	Bill Davis Racing	Sterling Marlin (No. 09)
4.	11	**Denny Hamlin**	Chevrolet	Joe Gibbs Racing	Scott Riggs (No. 10)
5.	12	Ryan Newman	Dodge	Penske Racing	Jeremy Mayfield (No. 36)
6.	25	Casey Mears	Chevrolet	Hendrick Motorsports	Kevin Lepage (No. 37)
7.	2	**Kurt Busch**	Dodge	Penske Racing	Boris Said (No. 60)
8.	20	**Tony Stewart**	Chevrolet	Joe Gibbs Racing	A. J. Allmendinger (No. 84)
9.	96	Tony Raines	Chevrolet	Hall of Fame Racing	
10.	41	Reed Sorenson	Dodge	Chip Ganassi Racing	
Chase drivers are in bold italics

=== Bank of America 500 ===
The fifth race of the 2007 Chase, the Bank of America 500, was held at Lowe's Motor Speedway on October 13, and was the only Saturday night race in the Chase schedule. Ryan Newman won his fifth pole of the year, and swept both poles at Lowe's Motor Speedway. The biggest surprise was that Brian Vickers, who drove to a top-five finish in the spring race, failed to make the field. After five consecutive DNF's at Lowe's, Jeff Gordon overcame a fuel issue, holding off Clint Bowyer and soon to be ex-teammate Kyle Busch for his first Charlotte victory since 1999. This race marked the 22nd and final time in his career that Jeff Gordon won back-to-back races. This race also featured Ned Jarrett as a guest on broadcasting, being his first broadcast experience since Atlanta in 2000.

Top ten results					Failed to qualify
Pos.	No.	Driver	Car	Team	Failed to qualify
1.	24	**Jeff Gordon**	Chevrolet	Hendrick Motorsports	Sam Hornish Jr. (No. 06)
2.	07	**Clint Bowyer**	Chevrolet	Richard Childress Racing	Carl Long (No. 08)
3.	5	**Kyle Busch**	Chevrolet	Hendrick Motorsports	Kirk Shelmerdine (No. 27)
4.	31	**Jeff Burton**	Chevrolet	Richard Childress Racing	Dale Jarrett (No. 44)
5.	99	**Carl Edwards**	Ford	Roush Fenway Racing	Joe Nemechek (No. 78)
6.	22	Dave Blaney	Toyota	Bill Davis Racing	Brian Vickers (No. 83)
7.	20	**Tony Stewart**	Chevrolet	Joe Gibbs Racing	
8.	9	Kasey Kahne	Dodge	Gillett Evernham Motorsports	
9.	40	David Stremme	Dodge	Chip Ganassi Racing	
10.	55	Michael Waltrip	Toyota	Michael Waltrip Racing	
Chase drivers are in bold italics

- This was the last time the 24 won back to back until 2023 where William Byron won back to back races. This also the last time Jeff Gordon won back to back races too.

=== Subway 500 ===
The sixth race of the 2007 Chase, the Subway 500, was held at Martinsville Speedway on October 21. This was the fifteenth race to feature the Car of Tomorrow. Jeff Gordon won the pole and Jimmie Johnson won the race.

Top ten results					Failed to qualify
Pos.	No.	Driver	Car	Team	Failed to qualify
1.	48	**Jimmie Johnson**	Chevrolet	Hendrick Motorsports	Sam Hornish Jr. (No. 06)
2.	12	Ryan Newman	Dodge	Penske Racing	Jeremy Mayfield (No. 36)
3.	24	**Jeff Gordon**	Chevrolet	Hendrick Motorsports	Kevin Lepage (No. 37)
4.	5	**Kyle Busch**	Chevrolet	Hendrick Motorsports	Joe Nemechek (No. 78)
5.	17	**Matt Kenseth**	Ford	Roush Fenway Racing	Brian Vickers (No. 83)
6.	11	**Denny Hamlin**	Chevrolet	Joe Gibbs Racing	
7.	16	Greg Biffle	Ford	Roush Fenway Racing	
8.	42	Juan Pablo Montoya **(R)**	Dodge	Chip Ganassi Racing	
9.	07	**Clint Bowyer**	Chevrolet	Richard Childress Racing	
10.	29	**Kevin Harvick**	Chevrolet	Richard Childress Racing	
Chase drivers are in bold italics

=== Pep Boys Auto 500 ===
The seventh race of the 2007 Chase, the Pep Boys Auto 500, was held at Atlanta Motor Speedway on October 28. Greg Biffle won his first pole of the season and Jimmie Johnson won his eighth race of the season.

Top ten results					Failed to qualify
Pos.	No.	Driver	Car	Team	Failed to qualify
1.	48	**Jimmie Johnson**	Chevrolet	Hendrick Motorsports	David Reutimann (No. 00)
2.	99	**Carl Edwards**	Ford	Roush Fenway Racing	Ward Burton (No. 4)
3.	41	Reed Sorenson	Dodge	Chip Ganassi Racing	Sam Hornish Jr. (No. 06)
4.	17	**Matt Kenseth**	Ford	Roush Fenway Racing	Burney Lamar (No. 08)
5.	31	**Jeff Burton**	Chevrolet	Richard Childress Racing	Mike Skinner (No. 36)
6.	07	**Clint Bowyer**	Chevrolet	Richard Childress Racing	
7.	24	**Jeff Gordon**	Chevrolet	Hendrick Motorsports	
8.	2	**Kurt Busch**	Dodge	Penske Racing	
9.	9	Kasey Kahne	Dodge	Gillett Evernham Motorsports	
10.	83	Brian Vickers	Toyota	Team Red Bull	
Chase drivers are in bold italics

=== Dickies 500 ===
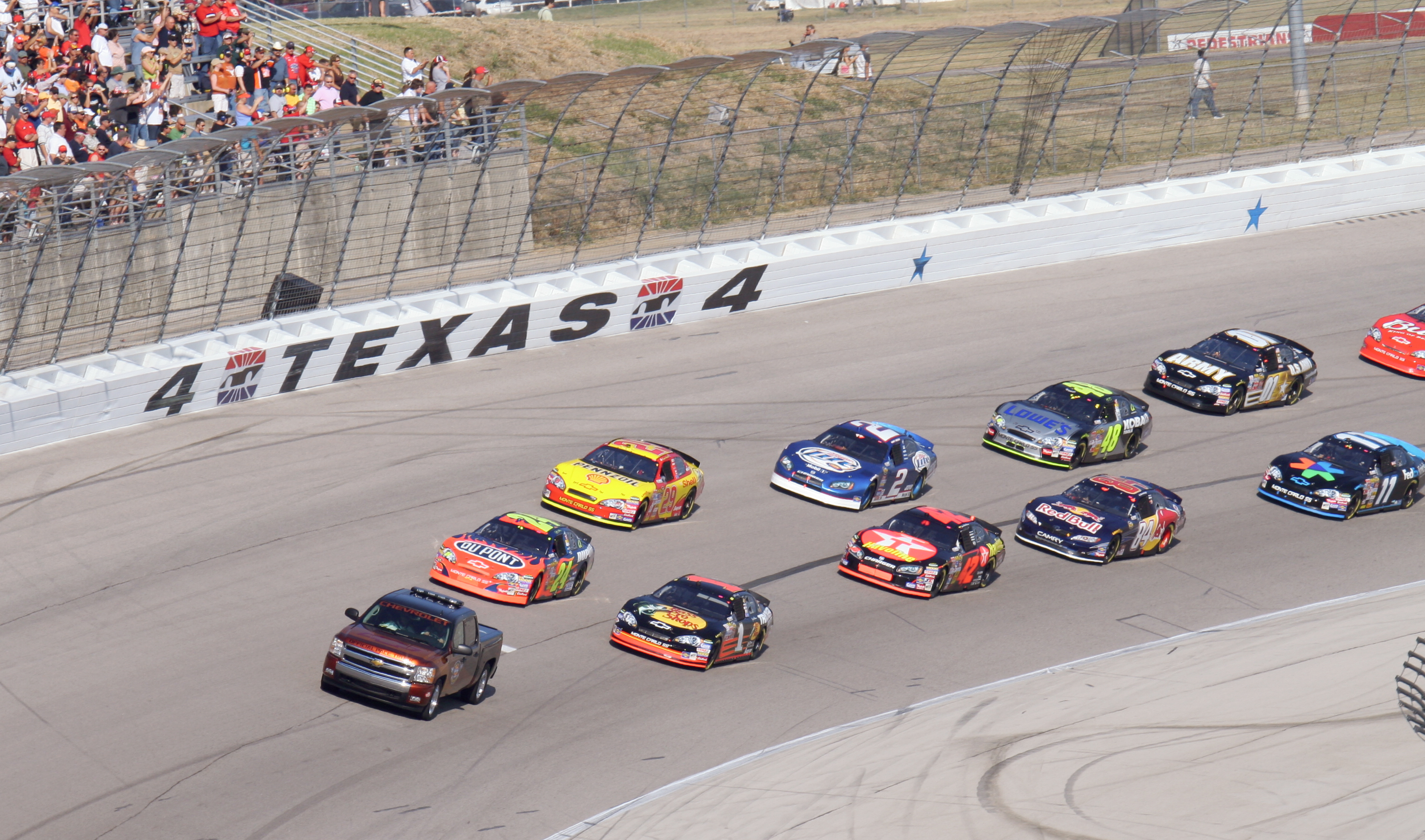
The pace car leading the field at Texas

The eighth race of the 2007 Chase, the Dickies 500, was held at Texas Motor Speedway on November 4. Martin Truex Jr. won his first career pole. Jimmie Johnson won his third race in a row and ninth in the season, and took the point lead.

Top ten results					Failed to qualify
Pos.	No.	Driver	Car	Team	Failed to qualify
1.	48	**Jimmie Johnson**	Chevrolet	Hendrick Motorsports	Ward Burton (No. 4)
2.	17	**Matt Kenseth**	Ford	Roush Fenway Racing	Burney Lamar (No. 08)
3.	1	**Martin Truex Jr.**	Chevrolet	Dale Earnhardt, Inc.	John Andretti (No. 49)
4.	5	**Kyle Busch**	Chevrolet	Hendrick Motorsports	Michael Waltrip (No. 55)
5.	12	Ryan Newman	Dodge	Penske Racing	
6.	31	**Jeff Burton**	Chevrolet	Richard Childress Racing	
7.	24	**Jeff Gordon**	Chevrolet	Hendrick Motorsports	
8.	2	**Kurt Busch**	Dodge	Penske Racing	
9.	26	Jamie McMurray	Ford	Roush Fenway Racing	
10.	29	**Kevin Harvick**	Chevrolet	Richard Childress Racing	
Chase drivers are in bold italics

=== Checker Auto Parts 500 presented by Pennzoil ===
The ninth and penultimate race of the 2007 chase, the Checker Auto Parts 500, was held at Phoenix International Raceway on November 11. This was the sixteenth and final 2007 race to feature the Car of Tomorrow. Carl Edwards won the pole, and Jimmie Johnson won both his 10th race of the season and fourth consecutive race. Johnson became the 1st driver since teammate Jeff Gordon to score both 10 victories in a single season, and 4 consecutive wins. Both accomplishments by Gordon came in the same season as well, back in 1998. As of 2021, Johnson is the last driver to accomplish four consecutive victories. He would be the last driver to win 10 races in a single season until future Hendrick Motorsports driver Kyle Larson pulled it off 14 seasons later in 2021; with the 2010s became the 1st decade in NASCAR history that a driver failed to either score 10 victories in a single season, or win 4 consecutive races. Jeff Gordon ties Dale Jarrett for the Modern Era record of most Top 10 finishes in a single season with 29. Jarrett accomplished that feat in his Championship season in 1999.

Top ten results					Failed to qualify
Pos.	No.	Driver	Car	Team	Failed to qualify
1.	48	**Jimmie Johnson**	Chevrolet	Hendrick Motorsports	David Reutimann (No. 00)
2.	16	Greg Biffle	Ford	Roush Fenway Racing	Ward Burton (No. 4)
3.	17	**Matt Kenseth**	Ford	Roush Fenway Racing	Dale Jarrett (No. 44)
4.	20	**Tony Stewart**	Chevrolet	Joe Gibbs Racing	John Andretti (No. 49)
5.	12	Ryan Newman	Dodge	Penske Racing	Michael Waltrip (No. 55)
6.	29	**Kevin Harvick**	Chevrolet	Richard Childress Racing	A. J. Allmendinger (No. 84)
7.	1	**Martin Truex Jr.**	Chevrolet	Dale Earnhardt, Inc.	
8.	5	**Kyle Busch**	Chevrolet	Hendrick Motorsports	
9.	31	**Jeff Burton**	Chevrolet	Richard Childress Racing	
10.	24	**Jeff Gordon**	Chevrolet	Hendrick Motorsports	
Chase drivers are in bold italics

=== Ford 400 ===
The 2007 Nextel Cup season came to a close with the final race of the 2007 season at Homestead–Miami Speedway on November 18. The race observed two lasts: The last use of the fourth-generation car introduced in 1992, since the Car of Tomorrow would be used full-time in 2008, and the last race under the Nextel Cup banner. Sprint assumed the title sponsorship starting with the 2008 Daytona 500. Jimmie Johnson won his fourth pole of the season. Matt Kenseth dominated, leading 214 laps en route to his second win of 2007, and Johnson finished seventh, clinching the championship by 77 points over teammate Jeff Gordon. Gordon breaks out of a tie with Dale Jarrett and finished out the 2007 season with 30 top 10 finishes. As of 2023, this is a NASCAR Modern Era record. Jarrett accomplished 29 top 10 finishes in his Championship season in 1999.

Top ten results					Failed to qualify
Pos.	No.	Driver	Car	Team	Failed to qualify
1.	17	**Matt Kenseth**	Ford	Roush Fenway Racing	Todd Bodine (No. 4)
2.	2	**Kurt Busch**	Dodge	Penske Racing	Burney Lamar (No. 08)
3.	11	**Denny Hamlin**	Chevrolet	Joe Gibbs Racing	John Andretti (No. 49)
4.	24	**Jeff Gordon**	Chevrolet	Hendrick Motorsports	Michael Waltrip (No. 55)
5.	99	**Carl Edwards**	Ford	Roush Fenway Racing	Joe Nemechek (No. 78)
6.	1	**Martin Truex Jr.**	Chevrolet	Dale Earnhardt, Inc.	A. J. Allmendinger (No. 84)
7.	48	**Jimmie Johnson**	Chevrolet	Hendrick Motorsports	
8.	31	**Jeff Burton**	Chevrolet	Richard Childress Racing	
9.	01	Mark Martin	Chevrolet	Dale Earnhardt, Inc.	
10.	6	David Ragan **(R)**	Ford	Roush Fenway Racing	
Chase drivers are in bold italics

== Full Driver standings ==
(key) Bold - Pole position awarded by time. Italics - Pole position set by owner's points standings. * – Most laps led.

Pos.	Driver	DAY	CAL	LVS	ATL	BRI	MAR	TEX	PHO	TAL	RCH	DAR	CLT	DOV	POC	MCH	SON	NHA	DAY	CHI	IND	POC	GLN	MCH	BRI	CAL	RCH	NHA	DOV	KAN	TAL	CLT	MAR	ATL	TEX	PHO	HOM	Pts.
1	Jimmie Johnson	39	3	1	1*	16	1	38	4	2	1	3	10	15	42	19	17	5	10	37	39	5	3	3	21	1	**1**	6	**14**	**3**	2	14*	1	1	1	1	**7**	6723
2	Jeff Gordon	10	**2**	2*	12	**3**	2	4*	**1**	**1***	**4***	1	41	9	1	9	7	2	5	9	3	4	9*	**27**	19	22	4*	2	11	5	1	1	**3***	7	7	10	4	6646
3	Clint Bowyer	18	6	36	6	8	11	16	22	35	9	**9**	29	8	10	16	4	37	7*	10	13	8	16	17	3	20	12	**1***	12	2	11	2	9	6	19	11	39	6377
4	Matt Kenseth	27	1*	4	3	11	10	2	5	14	10	7	12	5	9	42	34	9	8	2	10	14	12	4	39	7	14	7	35*	35	26	34	5	4	2	3*	1*	6298
5	Kyle Busch	24	9	9	32	1	4	37	7	37	2	37	30	17	8	6	8	11	2	13	4	12	7	13	9	3*	20	4	5	41	36	3	4	20	4*	8	20	6293
6	Tony Stewart	43	8	7	2	35*	7	25	2*	28	8	6	6	40	5	3	6	12	38	1*	1*	6	1	10	4	13	2	3	9	39	8	7	13	30	11	4	30	6242
7	Kurt Busch	41*	7	26	11	29	12	11	18	3	5	12	32*	42	16	25	22	21	3	6	11	1*	11	1*	6	**9**	9	25	29	11*	7	26	31	8	8	12	2	6231
8	Jeff Burton	3	4	15	4	2	6	1	13	34	43	10	24	12	13	24	3	7	16	7	8	11	40	14	12	4	18	18	7	36	43	4	12	5	6	9	8	6231
9	Carl Edwards	23	29	6	7	12	17	12	11	42	12	5	15	3	14	1*	18	13	4	3	18	21	8	7	1	2	42	12	1	37	14	5	11	2	26	**42**	5	6222
10	Kevin Harvick	1	17	27	25	4	41	29	10	6	7	17	21	20	11	7	2	8	34	4	7	17	36	15	16	14	7	17	20	6	20	33	10	15	10	6	19	6199
11	Martin Truex Jr.	29	42	12	8	37	29	7	20	10	28	11	16	1*	3	2	24	3	13	39	12	22	6	2	11	6	15	5	13	38	42	17	19	31*	3	7	6	6164
12	Denny Hamlin	28	11	3	19	14	**3**	9	3	21	3	2*	9	4	6*	14	10	1	43	17	22	3	2	5	43	19	6	15	38	29	4*	20	6	24	29	16	3	6143
Chase for the Nextel Cup cut-off
Pos.	Driver	DAY	CAL	LVS	ATL	BRI	MAR	TEX	PHO	TAL	RCH	DAR	CLT	DOV	POC	MCH	SON	NHA	DAY	CHI	IND	POC	GLN	MCH	BRI	CAL	RCH	NHA	DOV	KAN	TAL	CLT	MAR	ATL	TEX	PHO	HOM	Pts.
13	Ryan Newman	38	12	8	**23**	39	14	32	38	9	6	4	**39**	**2**	**2**	37	20	10	14	8	42	7	13	16	7	39	11	9	28	43	5	**28**	2	37	5	5	18	4046
14	Greg Biffle	25	15	16	41	5	32	6	17	29	19	15	43	6	30	38	5	31	6	11	15	23	10	19	10	17	39	13	2	1	23	27	7	22	33	2	13	3991
15	Casey Mears	20	31	40	28	10	42	23	37	39	18	35	1	13	4	4	27	23	19	**5**	35	10	15	11	22	15	17	8	6	4	6	21	20	12	31	13	16	3949
16	Dale Earnhardt Jr.	32	40	11	14	7	5*	36	19	7	13	8	8	22	12	5	13	4*	36	19	34	**2**	42	12	5	5	30	16	3	10	40	19	23	25	14	43	36	3929
17	Jamie McMurray	31	37	10	15	9	9	5	23	5	41	16	19	24	29	8	**37**	16	1	38	33	40	34	30	26	16	38	11	8	24	37	24	32	26	9	23	14	3556
18	Bobby Labonte	21	28	13	16	22	43	28	8	20	15	19	13	18	19	34	33	18	35	20	19	30	24	9	8	11	16	22	27	42	35	12	22	41	16	18	23	3517
19	Kasey Kahne	7	38	**35**	39	19	25	20	31	12	40	20	23	11	22	32	23	25	9	32	40	27	26	31	**2***	10	8	20	32	9	16	8	15	9	18	40	24	3489
20	Juan Pablo Montoya **(R)**	19	26	22	5	32	16	8	33	31	26	23	28	31	20	43	1	19	32	15	2	16	39	26	17	33	41	23	10	28	15	37	8	34	25	17	15	3487
21	J. J. Yeley	12	13	18	22	36	23	43	21	19	14	18	2	37	17	**28**	21	22	20	35	36	35	18	25	13	29	10	10	33	14	18	13	42	35	17	14	31	3456
22	Reed Sorenson	13	43	31	9	43	18	40	15	25	21	40	4	27	24	23	40	26	42	12	**5**	28	28	38	15	21	32	14	30	7	10	30	41	3	40	19	22	3275
23	David Ragan **(R)**	5	16	37	33	26	15	39	41	17	20	27	37	14	26	21	29	15	12	25	16	33	32	18	41	12	3	19	25	16	34	40	26	33	37	32	10	3251
24	David Stremme	11	19	20	13	13	35	10	43	8	38	34	17	36	23	40	32	27	22	34	26	25	21	21	14	34	19	42	39	17	17	9	37	39	41	20	11	3163
25	Elliott Sadler	6	24	14	18	27	24	17	34	15	27	21	36	26	21	35	14	33	33	33	28	32	17	32	29	35	27	38	17	8	24	41	40	14	12	27	38	3140
26	Robby Gordon	15	21	17	20	33	34	24	24	41	34	38	22	10	41	13	16*	17	15	36	27	QL	5	24	20	41	36	31	19	19	29	38	39	21	32	24	27	3014
27	Mark Martin	2	5	5	10			3	12		17	14	11	7	7	29			17	14	6	9		42			21		4	12		16		43	34		9	2960
28	David Gilliland	**8**	25	21	30	41	39	19	35	4	42	30	35	29	34	17	25	28	11	16	17	39	33	28	30	25	22	39	24	34	27	25	25	42	28	28	32	2924
29	Tony Raines	33	23	19	38	24	20	13	14	22	22	39	14	21	36	39		20	39	24	41	15		34	28	27	35	21	36	18	9	31	14	23	20	37	29	2920
30	Johnny Sauter	16	18	39	29	DNQ	31	22	9	30	36	29	27	32	40	26	31	14	18	22	37	36	23	29	42	30	5	28	42	23	12	23	29	32	27	15	41	2875
31	Dave Blaney	34	39	42	27	23	37	21	39	DNQ	11	32	18	DNQ	43	18	41	**29**	23	40	9	20	35	6	31	38	34	35	DNQ	15	3	6	36	38	21	31	12	2781
32	Jeff Green	36	30	25	35	6	36	26	6	13	24	22	42	30	32	36	42	6	37	27	43	19	20	22	27	23	33	27	31	20	13	32	28					2704
33	Ricky Rudd	26	27	30	26	38	13	33	26	33	37	26	7	39	27	22	11	30	31	21	24	13	38	33	38	40						11	27	17	15	35	21	2622
34	Paul Menard **(R)**	DNQ	20	32	31	DNQ	DNQ	15	25	43	16	31	DNQ	DNQ	28	12	DNQ	39	21	42	20	26	19	39	24	24	26	24	21	27	38	22	24	27	30	22	35	2496
35	Kyle Petty	42	22	28	34	20	22	35	30	18	25	25	3	34			39				32	34	43			28	25	37	40	21	28	18	21	13	42	29	34	2312
36	Scott Riggs	37	41	23	43	31	8	27	42	11	30	DNQ	20	23	18	33	DNQ	DNQ	41	DNQ	29	24		36	18	DNQ	40	32	34	13	DNQ	36	16	29	13			2135
37	Joe Nemechek	9	14	38	17	DNQ	27	18	16	38	33	28	26	25	15	30	38	41	30	29	DNQ			43		43	43	29	22	25	32	DNQ	DNQ	36	35	38	DNQ	2117
38	Brian Vickers	DNQ	10	DNQ	42	15	DNQ	14	DNQ	DNQ	DNQ	43	5	19	35	41	DNQ	DNQ	29	DNQ	21	29	41	8	DNQ	8	24	43	16	DNQ	39	DNQ	DNQ	10	23	21	42	2065
39	David Reutimann **(R)**	40	33	DNQ	40	DNQ	33	DNQ	32	32	29	33	DNQ	DNQ	38	15		38	26	43	38	41		23	DNQ	32	13	26	18	31	22	29	17	DNQ	43	DNQ	25	1878
40	Sterling Marlin	17	35	34	24	30	21	34	27	16	23	13	33	16	31	20	43	24	40	23					DNQ						DNQ					25	33	1752
41	Dale Jarrett	22	32	33	36	42	28	30	29	40	DNQ	DNQ	40	43	DNQ	DNQ	26	DNQ	27	DNQ	DNQ	42	29	DNQ	34	DNQ	31	DNQ	41	26	41	DNQ	30	19	38	DNQ	17	1584
42	Bill Elliott	DNQ											38	35	37	11	19	34	24	28	23	18	QL	35	25	26	29					35	34	18	36	34	28	1579
43	A. J. Allmendinger **(R)**	DNQ	DNQ	DNQ	DNQ	40	38	DNQ	DNQ	DNQ	32	36	31	33	39	31	DNQ	DNQ	DNQ	DNQ	DNQ	DNQ	DNQ	DNQ	35	18	23	33	43	DNQ	DNQ	15	35	16	39	DNQ	DNQ	1165
44	Michael Waltrip	30	DNQ	DNQ	DNQ	DNQ	DNQ	DNQ	DNQ	DNQ	DNQ	DNQ	DNQ	28	DNQ	10		DNQ	DNQ	30		38		40	23	42	DNQ	DNQ	15	30	**25**	10	18	11	DNQ	DNQ	DNQ	1149
45	Jeremy Mayfield	DNQ	DNQ	DNQ	DNQ	34	40	DNQ	DNQ	23	DNQ	DNQ	25	38	DNQ	DNQ		40	DNQ	26	DNQ	31	27	DNQ	37	36	DNQ	DNQ	DNQ	22	DNQ	39	DNQ	40	22	39	26	1126
46	Kenny Wallace	DNQ	DNQ	24	DNQ	21	DNQ	42	40	26	39	24	34	DNQ	DNQ	DNQ	DNQ	DNQ	25	DNQ	DNQ	DNQ	31		32		28	34	22	40								1066
47	Ward Burton	DNQ	DNQ	43	DNQ	18	DNQ	DNQ	36	36	35	DNQ	DNQ	41	33	DNQ	DNQ	43	DNQ	41	14	43	DNQ	20	33	DNQ	DNQ	41	DNQ	DNQ	DNQ	43	38	DNQ	DNQ	DNQ		939
48	John Andretti		34	DNQ	DNQ			DNQ	DNQ	DNQ						27		42	28	18				37	40	37	37	DNQ	37	33	33	42	33	28	DNQ	DNQ	DNQ	932
49	Ken Schrader	35	36	DNQ	37	28	19	31	28	DNQ	DNQ	41									25							30	26	32	31							932
50	Regan Smith	DNQ	Wth	Wth		25	26			29							30	32			Wth		37					36										516
51	Boris Said	14								27							9		DNQ				14					40			DNQ							510
52	Aric Almirola			41																					36	31					30		43			26		357
53	Mike Bliss	DNQ	DNQ	DNQ	21	17	30	41	DNQ	DNQ	DNQ	DNQ	DNQ	DNQ	DNQ	DNQ						DNQ																325
54	Ron Fellows																15						4															283
55	P. J. Jones																12					37	25															267
56	Mike Wallace	4								DNQ									DNQ												18							266
57	Patrick Carpentier																						22													33	40	209
58	Terry Labonte																35				30		30															204
59	Johnny Benson										31																									36	43	159
60	Jacques Villeneuve																														21					41		140
61	Chad McCumbee														25									41														128
62	Sam Hornish Jr.																											DNQ	DNQ		DNQ	DNQ	DNQ	DNQ		30	37	125
63	Chad Chaffin					Wth												36		31																		125
64	Kevin Lepage	DNQ	DNQ	DNQ	DNQ	DNQ	DNQ	DNQ		DNQ	DNQ	42	DNQ	DNQ	DNQ	DNQ		35	DNQ	DNQ	DNQ	DNQ		DNQ	DNQ		DNQ	DNQ	DNQ		DNQ		DNQ		DNQ			95
65	Mike Skinner	DNQ																																DNQ	24			91
66	Butch Leitzinger																28																					79
67	Jon Wood			29																										DNQ								76
68	Scott Wimmer		Wth		DNQ			DNQ								Wth					31			DNQ					DNQ									70
69	Marc Goossens																36						Wth															55
70	James Hylton	DNQ																																				
71	Frank Kimmel	DNQ																																				
72	Derrike Cope	DNQ	Wth	Wth																																		
73	Brandon Whitt **(R)**	DNQ	DNQ	DNQ																																		
74	Eric McClure	DNQ																	DNQ																			
75	Stanton Barrett	DNQ																							DNQ													
76	Kirk Shelmerdine	DNQ																	DNQ													DNQ						
77	Brandon Ash								DNQ								DNQ																					
78	Brian Simo																DNQ						DNQ															
79	Klaus Graf																DNQ						DNQ															
80	Larry Foyt																		DNQ																			
81	Marcos Ambrose																Wth						DNQ						Wth									
82	Carl Long																															DNQ						
83	Burney Lamar																																	DNQ	DNQ		DNQ	
84	Todd Bodine																																				DNQ	
Pos.	Driver	DAY	CAL	LVS	ATL	BRI	MAR	TEX	PHO	TAL	RCH	DAR	CLT	DOV	POC	MCH	SON	NHA	DAY	CHI	IND	POC	GLN	MCH	BRI	CAL	RCH	NHA	DOV	KAN	TAL	CLT	MAR	ATL	TEX	PHO	HOM	Pts.

For full top 12 drivers standings, please see 2007 Chase for the Nextel Cup.

== Television coverage ==
The 2007 season was the start of a new television package. The contracts are for eight seasons, running until 2014. NBC and FX both egressed after the 2006 season, and ESPN and ABC have returned after a six-year absence, with ESPN last broadcasting the series' NAPA 500 from Atlanta in November 2000, and ABC telecasting the Brickyard 400 in August of that same year.

=== Fox ===
Fox carried the first part of the season beginning with Speedweeks at Daytona, and continued coverage up through the June race held at the Dover International Speedway, with Fox-owned Speed Channel carrying the Gatorade Duel at Daytona qualifying races and the Nextel All-Star Challenge/Nextel Open doubleheader. Mike Joy, Larry McReynolds, and Darrell Waltrip returned to the broadcast booth for Fox. Fox also planned to carry two Craftsman Truck Series races March 31 and May 26, with Speed carrying the remainder of the series. The March 31 race at Martinsville was shown successfully on Fox, but the telecast for the May 26 race at Mansfield, OH was moved to Speed Channel after lap 50 due to rain delays.

=== TNT ===
TNT covered six mid-season races in June and July dubbed the "NASCAR Summer Series" including the Pepsi 400. The commentators included announcers Bill Weber and Wally Dallenbach Jr. Kyle Petty replaced Benny Parsons and also drove and did commentary from his car during the June 24 race at Sonoma, which turned out at the outset of the race to be rather embarrassing as he uttered "What the fuck was that?" in a replay of how he was involved in an accident. TNT used Hinder's cover of the Steppenwolf classic rock anthem "Born to Be Wild" as part of their race broadcast.

=== ESPN/ABC ===
ESPN and ABC carried all races beginning with the Allstate 400 at the Brickyard in late July on ESPN running up through the Labor Day weekend race at California and ABC picking up their part of the package with the final pre-chase race at Richmond and the entire Chase for the Nextel Cup. Jerry Punch served as the play-by-play and Rusty Wallace and Andy Petree served as color commentators. Punch last worked for the network as a pit reporter on IRL events such as the Indianapolis 500, and has also filled in on the play-by-play of NASCAR races prior to 2001, mostly during coverage of NASCAR Busch Series races, which ESPN2 and ABC will carried full-time starting in 2007. Wallace is the 1989 NASCAR Cup Series champion. They were joined by newcomer Andy Petree, a former team owner and Dale Earnhardt's crew chief in 1993 and 1994. Brent Musburger and Suzy Kolber served as the hosts on both ESPN and ABC. Rock group Aerosmith kicked off each broadcast with a live version of their big 1970s FM hit "Back in the Saddle" that was filmed in concert in Las Vegas.

== Rookies ==
For the second consecutive year, the fight for ROTY was expected to be fierce, as competitors from all areas or racing expertise battled in NASCAR's top level. The most profiled rookie was ex-Formula One driver Juan Pablo Montoya, driving Chip Ganassi Racing's No. 42 Dodge vacated by Casey Mears. Montoya would permanently leave F1 after a fallout with his boss, Ron Dennis. Montoya was widely criticized for his over-aggressive driving style in his open-wheel days. Although this came to be true in the early part of the season, Montoya, with help from his owner, teammates, and crew chiefs, managed to tame his aggressive nature and translate it into his first ever win at Infineon Raceway, becoming the first foreign driver to win a race since Earl Ross of Canada at Martinsville in 1974. The win would propel Montoya to be the first ever foreign-born driver to win ROTY. Runner-up David Ragan had big shoes to fill, as he would be taking over the legendary No. 6 ride for veteran Mark Martin. Despite his limited experience in NASCAR, having only run part-time in the ARCA RE/MAX Series and the Craftsman Truck Series, Ragan would make a splash with a fifth-place finish in the Daytona 500. After that, he would have an up and down year, gaining experience along the way. As Montoya and Ragan were the only two drivers with guaranteed starting spots, the rest of the rookies were trying to make races with new teams. Busch Series driver Paul Menard continued his relationship with DEI, but struggled to make races until the DEI-Ginn merger (see "Merger Mania" section). Another open wheel immigrant, ex-Champ Car driver A. J. Allmendinger struggled to adjust to stock cars, and his development as a driver was further hampered with his allegiance with Toyota, a new manufacturer. Former Truck Series driver David Reutimann also struggled with a new team and manufacturer, and like Allmendinger and Menard, was out of the critical top 35 in owners points. Brandon Whitt attempted at least a partial schedule with CJM Racing, but after missing race after race, the team decided to release Whitt and move down to the Busch Series.

== Test schedule ==
In 2006, NASCAR instituted a new track testing policy that set a schedule for when and where NASCAR Nextel Cup Series tests were conducted. These scheduled tests are the only opportunities that the NNCS teams will have to test their cars at NNCS tracks.

The testing issue has become a controversy because teams, especially Chevrolet teams, have been testing their cars at various non-NNCS tracks listed below in the "Notes" section. All test reports are being telecast on Speed Channel.

Date	Venue	Rain date	Track	TV times	Type of car
January 8–10	Daytona International Speedway*	January 11	2.5 mi.; tri-oval	7PM	Standard / CoT
January 15–17	Daytona International Speedway**	January 18	2.5 mi.; tri-oval	6:30 pm	Standard / CoT
January 29 & 30	Las Vegas Motor Speedway	January 31	1.5 mi.; quad-oval	7 PM	Standard / CoT
February 28≈	Bristol Motor Speedway	None	0.533 mi.; oval	7 PM	CoT
April 3 & 4	Richmond International Raceway	April 5	0.75 mi.; D-shaped oval	None	CoT
May 7 & 8	Lowe's Motor Speedway	May 9	1.5 mi.; quad-oval	None	Standard
September 10 & 11	Talladega Superspeedway	September 12	2.66 mi.; tri-oval	None	CoT
October 30 & 31	Atlanta Motor Speedway	November 1	1.54 mi.; quad-oval	None	CoT

(*) – Even numbered finishers in the 2006 Nextel Cup standings.
(**) – Odd numbered finishers in the 2006 Nextel Cup standings.
(≈) – Only one day was used as this was extended by NASCAR to three sessions due to an oncoming rainstorm on March 1.
CoT – Car of Tomorrow.

Notes: The scheduled tests for Dover on May 14–15 were cancelled due to the rainout of the Dodge Avenger 500 from May 12 to 13. The tests of Atlanta Motor Speedway were added on August 22 as the replacement for Dover.

In addition to these tests, Goodyear (in conjunction with NASCAR) stages closed practices to test tire combinations for NNCS tracks.

NASCAR does not limit testing at non-Nextel Cup Series circuits (using Hoosier, Michelin, or non-current Goodyear tires) such as Kentucky, Rockingham, Greenville-Pickens, Milwaukee, Nashville, or USA International Speedway. Many teams also use Virginia International Raceway for road course testing.

== See also ==
- 2007 NASCAR Busch Series
- 2007 NASCAR Craftsman Truck Series
- 2007 NASCAR Busch East Series
- 2007 ARCA Re/Max Series
- 2007 NASCAR Whelen Modified Tour
- 2007 NASCAR Whelen Southern Modified Tour
- 2007 NASCAR Canadian Tire Series
- 2007 NASCAR Corona Series
- 2007 Chase for the Nextel Cup
- List of all-time NASCAR Cup Series winners
- 2007 in sports

== External links and sources ==
- Official NASCAR site
- RacingOne
- Jayski's Silly Season Site
- Speed Channel
- ThatsRacin.com
- 2007 Nextel Cup drivers standings
- Rudd Won't Drive No. 28
