= Robbie Reiser =

American racing driver

Robert John Reiser
- Born: June 27, 1963 (age 63); Allenton, Wisconsin, U.S.
- Awards: 2003 NASCAR Winston Cup Series championship crew chief

NASCAR O'Reilly Auto Parts Series career
- 29 races run over 5 years
- Best finish: 30th (1995)
- First race: 1993 Havoline 250 (Milwaukee)
- Last race: 1997 Moore's Snacks 250 (Bristol)
Wins	Top tens	Poles
0	1	0

NASCAR FedEx Freight Truck Series career
- 3 races run over 1 year
- Best finish: 65th (1996)
- First race: 1996 Sears Auto Center 200 (Milwaukee)
- Last race: 1996 GM Goodwrench/AC Delco 300 (Phoenix
Wins	Top tens	Poles
0	0	0

Robert Reiser (born June 27, 1963) is an American former crew chief and a general manager for RFK Racing. Reiser is the son of Alice and John Reiser, who served as general manager for Roush Racing's Busch and Craftsman Truck series race shops.

== Career ==
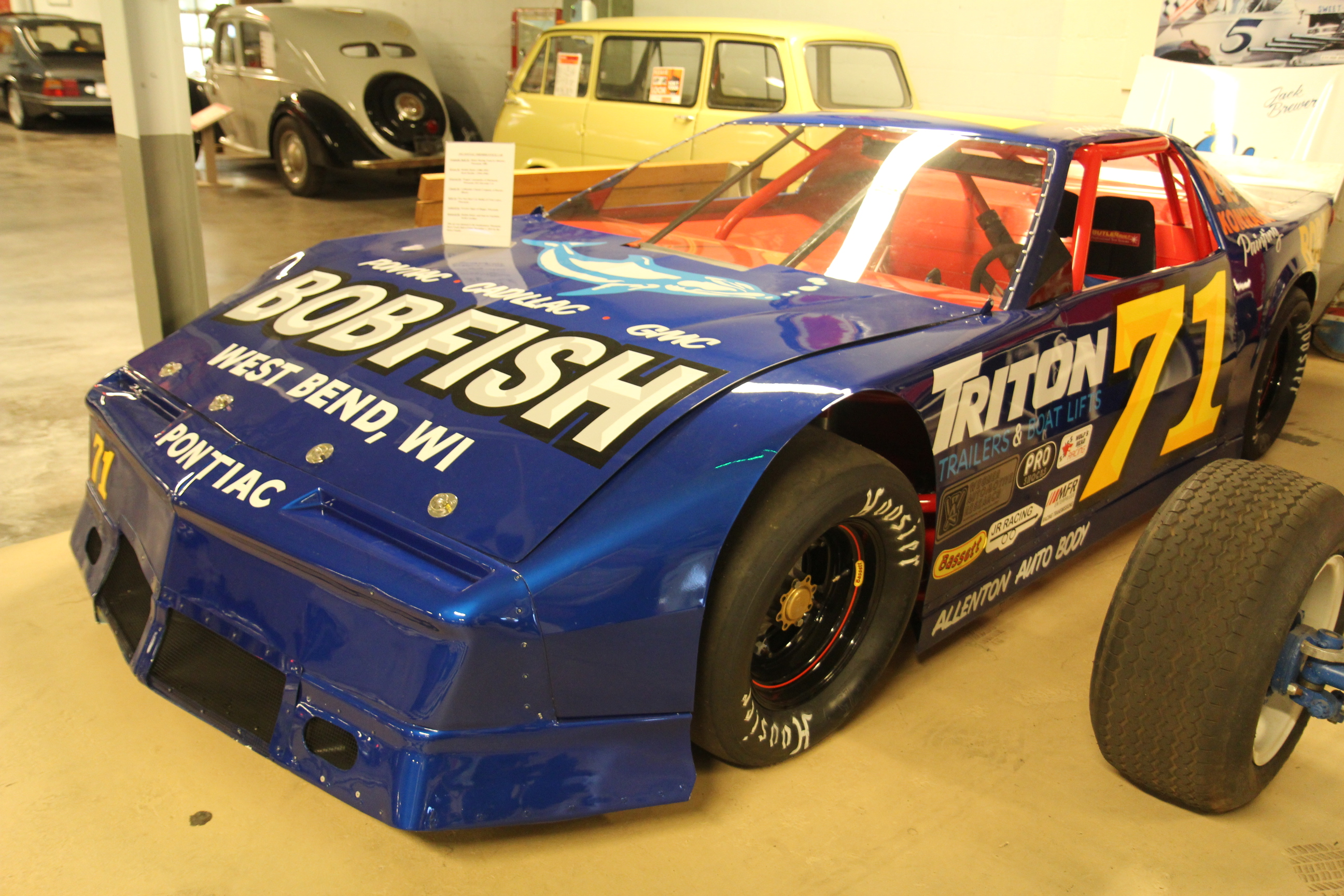
The late model that Reiser used while racing in Wisconsin

Reiser started racing on the short tracks of Wisconsin. In 1984, he began driving late models. He won fourteen different track, area and regional championships from 1990 to 1992. From 1993 to 1997, his racing career culminated as a driver/owner in the NASCAR Busch Series.

=== Crew chief ===
In 1997, Reiser decided to stop his racing career in the Busch Grand National Series, he put snowmobile racer Tim Bender in his car. Bender got hurt after the eighth race at Texas, so he put his former Wisconsin competitor Matt Kenseth in the drivers seat until Bender recovered. Reiser lost the 1994 late model track championship at Madison International Speedway to Kenseth. Kenseth was quickly successful. Then Reiser and Kenseth combined for a second-place finish in 1998 and a third-place finish in 1999. In 2000, Jack Roush hired Kenseth, Reiser, and their entire Busch team to run full-time in Winston Cup. The combination was again successful. They rapidly moved up the final points each year. In 2003, Kenseth and Reiser dominated to win the final Winston Cup championship as driver/crew chief. With Reiser from 2000 to 2007, Kenseth won 16 races. In 2008, Reiser served as interim crew chief for Carl Edwards, helping Edwards win at Texas Motor Speedway.

=== General manager ===
Near the end of the 2007 season, Reiser was named the general manager for all five of Roush Fenway Racing's Nextel/Sprint Cup teams. His last race as crew chief was the Ford 400 at Homestead-Miami Speedway in Florida, which became the second victory of the season for driver Matt Kenseth.

Reiser was relieved of his duties as RFR GM on November 22, 2016.

== Motorsports career results ==
=== NASCAR ===
(key) (Bold – Pole position awarded by qualifying time. Italics – Pole position earned by points standings or practice time. * – Most laps led.)

==== Busch Grand National Series ====
NASCAR Busch Grand National Series results
Year	Team	No.	Make	1	2	3	4	5	6	7	8	9	10	11	12	13	14	15	16	17	18	19	20	21	22	23	24	25	26	27	28	29	30	NBGNSC	Pts	Ref
1993	Reiser Enterprises	71	Chevy	DAY	CAR	RCH	DAR	BRI	HCY	ROU	MAR	NZH	CLT	DOV	MYB	GLN	MLW; 21	TAL	IRP	MCH	NHA	BRI	DAR	RCH	DOV	ROU	CLT	MAR	CAR	HCY	ATL			92nd	100	
1994	Reiser Enterprises	17	Chevy	DAY	CAR	RCH; DNQ	ATL; DNQ	MAR; DNQ		HCY; 24	BRI	ROU; DNQ	NHA	NZH	CLT; DNQ	DOV	MYB; 21	GLN		SBO; 26	TAL	HCY; 23		MCH; 25	BRI; 31	DAR	RCH	DOV	CLT	MAR	CAR			48th	735	
1994	Reiser Enterprises	17	Pontiac						DAR; 35										MLW; 30				IRP; 29											48th	735	
1995	Reiser Enterprises	17	Chevy	DAY; 29	CAR; 38	RCH; DNQ	ATL	NSV; 9	DAR; 42	BRI; 13	HCY; 28	NHA; DNQ	NZH; 30	CLT; DNQ	DOV; 17	MYB; 16	GLN	MLW; 36	TAL; 18	SBO	IRP	MCH	BRI; 27	DAR; 24	RCH; 37	DOV; 23	CLT; 33	CAR; DNQ	HOM; 23					30th	1444	
1996	Reiser Enterprises	17	Ford	DAY	CAR	RCH	ATL	NSV	DAR	BRI	HCY	NZH	CLT	DOV; DNQ	SBO	MYB	GLN	MLW; 18	NHA	TAL	IRP	MCH	BRI	DAR	RCH	DOV								81st	109	
1996	Stricklin Racing	28	Ford																								CLT; DNQ	CAR; DNQ	HOM					81st	109	
1997	Reiser Enterprises	17	Chevy	DAY	CAR	RCH	ATL	LVS	DAR	HCY	TEX	BRI; 41	NSV	TAL	NHA	NZH	CLT	DOV	SBO	GLN	MLW	MYB	GTY	IRP	MCH	BRI	DAR	RCH	DOV	CLT	CAL	CAR	HOM	116th	40	

==== Craftsman Truck Series ====
NASCAR Craftsman Truck Series results
Year	Team	No.	Make	1	2	3	4	5	6	7	8	9	10	11	12	13	14	15	16	17	18	19	20	21	22	23	24	NCTC	Pts	Ref
1996	Mueller Brothers Racing	4	Chevy	HOM	PHO	POR	EVG	TUS	CNS	HPT	BRI	NZH	MLW; 26	LVL	I70	IRP	FLM	GLN	NSV									65th	288	
1996	Mueller Brothers Racing	42	Chevy																	RCH; 22	NHA	MAR	NWS	SON	MMR	PHO; 19	LVS	65th	288	
