= John Reiser =

American racing driver

John Reiser (June 24, 1938 – November 19, 2005) was an American race car driver and successful businessman from Wisconsin. He founded Triton Trailers in Hartford, Wisconsin. He later founded Reiser Enterprises in Denver, North Carolina, in which he furthered the career of his son Robbie. Robbie was the crew chief in the NASCAR Sprint Cup Series for Roush Fenway Racing team driver Matt Kenseth. Later, Robbie became the general manager for Roush Fenway at the end of 2007, leaving Matt Kenseth. Robbie left in style, winning their last race together at Homestead-Miami Speedway. It was also the last race for the old car.

Reiser raced in Wisconsin from 1958 to 1976, winning the Wisconsin Late Model Dirt Track Championship in 1972. He raced that year at tracks including Hales Corners Speedway in metro Milwaukee. He later served as general manager of Roush's Busch Series and Craftsman Truck Series race shops, overseeing five teams. He died of cancer in November 2005.
