= Brandon Whitt =

American racing driver (born 1982)

- Born: October 15, 1982 (age 44); El Cajon, California, U.S.
- Awards: 2002 NASCAR Featherlite Southwest Series Rookie of the Year

NASCAR Cup Series career
- 1 race run over 1 year
- Best finish: 76th (2006)
- First race: 2006 Checker Auto Parts 500 (Phoenix)
Wins	Top tens	Poles
0	0	0

NASCAR O'Reilly Auto Parts Series career
- 31 races run over 2 years
- Best finish: 40th (2009)
- First race: 2008 Dollar General 300 (Chicago)
- Last race: 2009 NorthernTool.com 250 (Milwaukee)
Wins	Top tens	Poles
0	0	0

NASCAR FedEx Freight Truck Series career
- 58 races run over 4 years
- Best finish: 18th (2005)
- First race: 2003 Lucas Oil 250 (Mesa Marin)
- Last race: 2007 EasyCare Vehicle Service Contracts 200 (Atlanta)
- First win: 2005 O'Reilly 200 (Memphis)
Wins	Top tens	Poles
1	5	2
- Statistics up to date as of September 19, 2012.

Brandon Weslee Whitt (born October 15, 1982) is an American former stock car racing driver. A third-generation racer, he has run in all three of NASCAR's top divisions. He is the older cousin of former NASCAR Cup Series driver Cole Whitt.

== Racing career ==
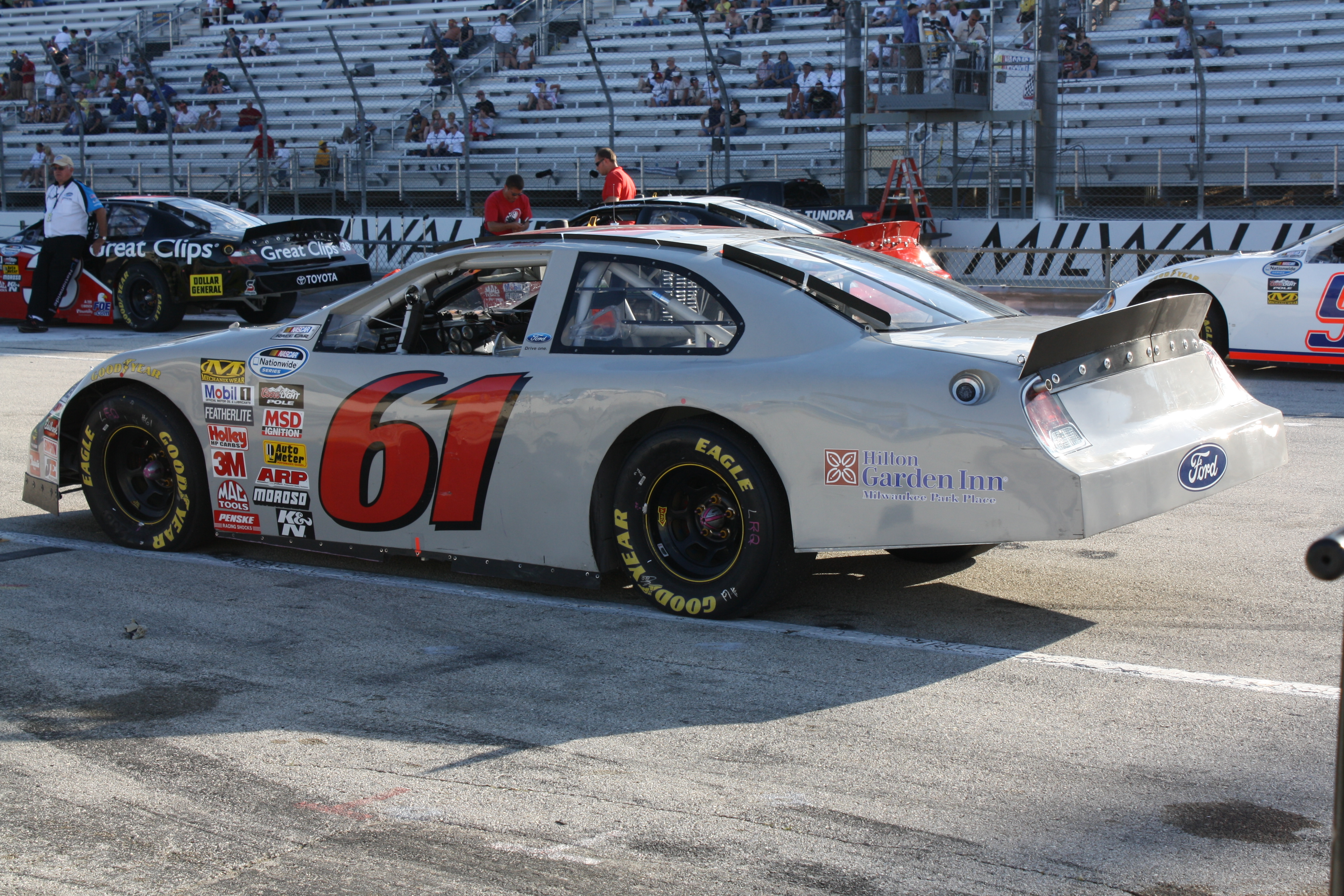
Whitt's #61 before his final race for Specialty Racing at Milwaukee

Whitt won the Rookie of the Year title in NASCAR's Southwest Touring division in 2002 while attending college, and made his Craftsman Truck Series debut in 2003, driving the No. 38 Chevrolet Silverado for Clean Line Motorsports, a team his father owned. He finished thirteenth in his debut, and ran six additional races that season, his best finish a thirteenth at California Speedway.

In 2004, Whitt and his team ran the Truck Series full-time with sponsorship from McMillin Homes and running Ford F-150s. Despite not finishing any race higher than 12th in his rookie season, Whitt finished 19th in the final standings.

During the 2005 season, Whitt's team was purchased by Jeff Hammond and Tom DeLoach, renamed Red Horse Racing and switched to Toyota. He won his first race at Memphis Motorsports Park (from the pole) after taking the lead from a spinning Ron Hornaday Jr. on the last lap. He was dismissed from the team at the end of the season, leaving him out of a ride. However, Whitt soon signed with ARCA Racing Series team CLR Racing. In 2006, he attempted his first NEXTEL Cup race at Phoenix International Raceway with CJM Racing and qualified 37th, but finished 43rd. He was scheduled to run with CJM for twelve races in 2007, but those plans changed when Whitt was released from the ride. Whitt drove one race later that season for Red Horse at Atlanta, where he finished 23rd.

Midway through 2008, Whitt signed to drive for Specialty Racing in the Nationwide Series. On June 22, 2009, Whitt announced that he has left Specialty Racing and the No. 61 team. He has not raced since.

== Motorsports career results ==
=== NASCAR ===
(key) (Bold – Pole position awarded by qualifying time. Italics – Pole position earned by points standings or practice time. * – Most laps led.)

==== Nextel Cup Series ====
NASCAR Nextel Cup Series results
Year	Team	No.	Make	1	2	3	4	5	6	7	8	9	10	11	12	13	14	15	16	17	18	19	20	21	22	23	24	25	26	27	28	29	30	31	32	33	34	35	36	NNCC	Pts	Ref
2006	CJM Racing	72	Chevy	DAY	CAL	LVS	ATL	BRI	MAR	TEX	PHO	TAL	RCH	DAR	CLT	DOV	POC	MCH	SON	DAY	CHI	NHA	POC	IND	GLN	MCH	BRI	CAL	RCH	NHA	DOV	KAN	TAL	CLT	MAR	ATL	TEX	PHO; 43	HOM; DNQ	76th	34	
2007	CJM Racing	72	Chevy	DAY; DNQ	CAL; DNQ	LVS; DNQ	ATL	BRI	MAR	TEX	PHO	TAL	RCH	DAR	CLT	DOV	POC	MCH	SON	NHA	DAY	CHI	IND	POC	GLN	MCH	BRI	CAL	RCH	NHA	DOV	KAN	TAL	CLT	MAR	ATL	TEX	PHO	HOM	N/A	-	

===== Daytona 500 =====
Year	Team	Manufacturer	Start	Finish
2007	CJM Racing	Chevrolet	DNQ	

==== Nationwide Series ====
NASCAR Nationwide Series results
Year	Team	No.	Make	1	2	3	4	5	6	7	8	9	10	11	12	13	14	15	16	17	18	19	20	21	22	23	24	25	26	27	28	29	30	31	32	33	34	35	NNSC	Pts	Ref
2008	Specialty Racing	61	Ford	DAY	CAL	LVS	ATL	BRI	NSH	TEX	PHO	MXC	TAL	RCH	DAR	CLT	DOV	NSH	KEN	MLW	NHA	DAY	CHI; 41	GTY; 28	IRP; 35			MCH; 32	BRI; 33	CAL; 25	RCH; 28	DOV; 23	KAN; 27	CLT; 21	MEM; 28	TEX; 40	PHO; 30	HOM; 38	46th	1087	
2008	Specialty Racing	62	Ford																							CGV; 38	GLN; 40												46th	1087	
2009	Specialty Racing	61	Ford	DAY; 37	CAL; 23	LVS; 24	BRI; 24	TEX; 23	NSH; 30	PHO; 26	TAL; 30	RCH; 30	DAR; 25	CLT; 29	DOV; 20	NSH; 20	KEN; 24	MLW; 30	NHA	DAY	CHI	GTY	IRP	IOW	GLN	MCH	BRI	CGV	ATL	RCH	DOV	KAN	CAL	CLT	MEM	TEX	PHO	HOM	40th	1260	

==== Craftsman Truck Series ====
NASCAR Craftsman Truck Series results
Year	Team	No.	Make	1	2	3	4	5	6	7	8	9	10	11	12	13	14	15	16	17	18	19	20	21	22	23	24	25	NCTC	Pts	Ref
2003	Clean Line Motorsports	38	Chevy	DAY	DAR	MMR; 19	MAR	CLT	DOV	TEX	MEM	MLW	KAN; 26	KEN; 30	GTW	MCH	IRP	NSH	BRI	RCH	NHA	CAL; 13	LVS; 26	SBO	TEX; 34	MAR	PHO	HOM; 35	40th	592	
2004	Clean Line Motorsports	38	Ford	DAY; 22	ATL; 20	MAR; 14	MFD; 18	CLT; 18	DOV; 31	TEX; 22	MEM; 15	MLW; 15	KAN; 23	KEN; 14	GTW; 23	MCH; 28	IRP; 20	NSH; 17	BRI; 31	RCH; 17	NHA; 19	LVS; 13	CAL; 35	TEX; 15	MAR; 12	PHO; 20	DAR; 14	HOM; 26	19th	2569	
2005	Red Horse Racing	38	Toyota	DAY; 28	CAL; 23	ATL; 15	MAR; 29	GTY; 33	MFD; 30	CLT; 23	DOV; 32	TEX; 15	MCH; 34	MLW; 13	KAN; 16	KEN; 6	**MEM**; 1	IRP; 24	NSH; 23	BRI; 20	RCH; 33	NHA; 27	LVS; 9	MAR; 3	ATL; 8	TEX; 15	**PHO**; 19	HOM; 29	18th	2602	
2007	Red Horse Racing	1	Toyota	DAY	CAL	ATL	MAR	KAN	CLT	MFD	DOV	TEX	MCH	MLW	MEM	KEN	IRP	NSH	BRI	GTW	NHA	LVS	TAL	MAR	ATL; 23	TEX	PHO	HOM	92nd	94	
2008	Morgan-Dollar Motorsports	47	Chevy	DAY	CAL; QL^{†}	ATL	MAR																						NA	-	
2008	Wood Brothers Racing	21	Ford					KAN; QL^{‡}	CLT	MFD	DOV	TEX	MCH	MLW	MEM	KEN	IRP	NSH	BRI	GTW	NHA	LVS	TAL	MAR	ATL	TEX	PHO	HOM	NA	-	
^{†} - Qualified for A. J. Allmendinger · ^{‡} - Qualified for Jon Wood

=== ARCA Re/Max Series ===
(key) (Bold – Pole position awarded by qualifying time. Italics – Pole position earned by points standings or practice time. * – Most laps led.)

ARCA Re/Max Series results
Year	Team	No.	Make	1	2	3	4	5	6	7	8	9	10	11	12	13	14	15	16	17	18	19	20	21	22	23	ARSC	Pts	Ref
2006	CLR Racing	57	Ford	DAY; DNQ	NSH	SLM	WIN	KEN	TOL	POC	MCH	KAN	KEN	BLN	POC	GTW	NSH	MCH	ISF	MIL	TOL	DSF					144th	100	
2006	Brandon Whitt Racing	51	Dodge																				CHI; 31	SLM	TAL	IOW	144th	100	
2007	Brandon Whitt Racing	51	Toyota	DAY; 34	USA	NSH	SLM	KAN	WIN	KEN	TOL	IOW	POC	MCH	BLN	KEN	POC	NSH	ISF	MIL	GTW	DSF	CHI	SLM	TAL	TOL	173rd	60	
