= CJM Racing =

Former NASCAR team

- Owner(s): Bryan Mullet; Tony Mullet; Greg Pollex
- Base: Mooresville, North Carolina
- Series: Sprint Cup Series; Nationwide Series; Camping World Truck Series
- Manufacturer: Chevy; Ford; Toyota
- Opened: 2006
- Closed: 2009

Career
- Drivers' Championships: 0
- Race victories: 0

CJM Racing was a NASCAR Nationwide Series team. It fielded the No. 11 car for a variety of drivers.

== Sprint Cup Series ==
Businessmen Bryan and Tony Mullet formed Victory Motorsports in 2006 when they purchased the Sprint Cup equipment of Shepherd Racing Ventures from Morgan Shepherd. After failing to make the field for each of the early attempts, Shepherd and the team went their separate ways and the team changed its name to CJM Racing. Kertus Davis and David Gilliland, and Brent Sherman took over the newly renumbered Dutch Quality Stone No. 72 car. Mike Skinner drove the car for two races that season.

=== Car No. 72 results ===
NASCAR Nextel Cup Series results
Year	Driver	No.	Make	1	2	3	4	5	6	7	8	9	10	11	12	13	14	15	16	17	18	19	20	21	22	23	24	25	26	27	28	29	30	31	32	33	34	35	36	Owners	Pts
2006	Kertus Davis	72	Dodge	DAY	CAL	LVS	ATL	BRI	MAR	TEX	PHO	TAL	RCH	DAR	CLT; DNQ	DOV				DAY; DNQ	CHI	NHA	POC	IND																56th	317
2006	Brent Sherman	72	Dodge														POC; DNQ	MCH																						56th	317
2006	David Gilliland	72	Dodge																SON; 32																					56th	317
2006	Dale Quarterley	72	Dodge																						GLN; DNQ	MCH	BRI	CAL	RCH	NHA	DOV	KAN	TAL							56th	317
2006	Mike Skinner	72	Chevy																															CLT; 43	MAR; 39	ATL; DNQ	TEX; DNQ			56th	317
2006	Brandon Whitt	72	Chevy																																			PHO; 43	HOM; DNQ	56th	317
2007	Brandon Whitt	72	Chevy	DAY; DNQ	CAL; DNQ	LVS; DNQ	ATL	BRI	MAR	TEX	PHO	TAL	RCH	DAR	CLT	DOV	POC	MCH	SON	NHA	DAY	CHI	IND	POC	GLN	MCH	BRI	CAL	RCH	NHA	DOV	KAN	TAL	CLT	MAR	ATL	TEX	PHO	HOM	62nd	32

== Nationwide Series ==
The team announced that Brandon Whitt would be the team's Cup driver for 2007, but after three races, it switched to the Busch Series and the No. 11. Jason Keller served as the team's driver and Force Protection Inc. and vehicle history company Carfax signed as sponsors. Keller was moderately successful in the No. 11, with four of his five top 10 finishes for 2007 coming in that car. Keller also made his historic 418th start in the No. 11, beating the record set by Tommy Houston.

CJM started 2008 unsponsored, but negotiated a one race contract for Las Vegas with America's Incredible Pizza Company, which turned into a race by race sponsorship and eventually a season long sponsorship. Desiring new direction, the team released Keller after the fall Richmond race, heading to Baker Curb Racing. The team signed former Chip Gannasi Racing driver, Scott Lagasse Jr. for the rest of 2008 and 2009.

The team switched to Toyota with support from Joe Gibbs Racing for 2009. After the U.S. Cellular 250, it released Lagasse and replaced him with Trevor Bayne, Kelly Bires, Mike Bliss, Denny Hamlin, Andrew Ranger, and Brian Scott. With the driver's release, America's Incredible Pizza left as well, leaving Ridemakerz and FedEx to assume sponsorship. The team also fielded the No. 14 Lofton Cattle Toyota to Justin Lofton in the Carfax 200, starting 19th and finishing 16th in Lofton's series debut.

=== Car No. 11 results (primary entry) ===
Year	Driver	No.	Make	1	2	3	4	5	6	7	8	9	10	11	12	13	14	15	16	17	18	19	20	21	22	23	24	25	26	27	28	29	30	31	32	33	34	35	Owners	Pts
2007	Jason Keller	11	Chevy	DAY	CAL	MXC	LVS	ATL	BRI	NSH	TEX	PHO	TAL	RCH	DAR; 14	CLT	DOV; 13	NSH; 6	KEN		NHA; 26	DAY	CHI; 35	GTY	IRP	CGV	GLN	MCH; 22	BRI; 24	CAL	RCH; 10	DOV; 8	KAN; 16	CLT; 34	MEM; 8	TEX; 22	PHO; 35	HOM; 28	39th	1672
2007	Marc Mitchell	11	Chevy																	MLW; 20																			39th	1672
2008	Jason Keller	11	Chevy	DAY; 36	CAL; 14	LVS; 18	ATL; 14	BRI; 15	NSH; 18	TEX; 12	PHO; 32	MXC; 17	TAL; 21	RCH; 19	DAR; 7	CLT; 17	DOV; 16	NSH; 15	KEN; 10	MLW; 9	NHA; 11	DAY; 18	CHI; 14	GTY; 3	IRP; 24	CGV; 23	GLN; 32	MCH; 17	BRI; 12	CAL; 14	RCH; 16								17th	3801
2008	Scott Lagasse Jr.	11	Chevy																													DOV; 31	KAN; 20	CLT; 13	MEM; 24	TEX; 25	PHO; 20	HOM; 37	17th	3801
2009	Scott Lagasse Jr.	11	Toyota	DAY; 43	CAL; 12	LVS; 9	BRI; 13	TEX; 16	NSH; 10	PHO; 32	TAL; 8	RCH; 17	DAR; 22	CLT; 32	DOV; 27	NSH; 11	KEN; 13	MLW; 16	NHA; 16	DAY; 18	CHI; 20	GTY; 33	IRP; 37	IOW; 9															15th	3951
2009	Denny Hamlin	11	Toyota																						GLN; 34	MCH; 32												HOM; 5	15th	3951
2009	Brian Scott	11	Toyota																								BRI; 30					KAN; 14							15th	3951
2009	Andrew Ranger	11	Toyota																									CGV; 3											15th	3951
2009	Kelly Bires	11	Toyota																										ATL; 32										15th	3951
2009	Trevor Bayne	11	Toyota																											RCH; 7			CAL; 19						15th	3951
2009	Mike Bliss	11	Toyota																												DOV; 2			CLT; 2	MEM; 4*	TEX; 10	PHO; 8		15th	3951

=== Car No. 12/14 results (secondary entry) ===
Year	Driver	No.	Make	1	2	3	4	5	6	7	8	9	10	11	12	13	14	15	16	17	18	19	20	21	22	23	24	25	26	27	28	29	30	31	32	33	34	35	Owners	Pts
2007	Marc Mitchell	12	Chevy	DAY	CAL	MXC	LVS	ATL	BRI	NSH	TEX	PHO	TAL	RCH	DAR	CLT	DOV	NSH	KEN	MLW	NHA	DAY	CHI	GTY	IRP	CGV	GLN	MCH	BRI	CAL	RCH	DOV	KAN	CLT	MEM; DNQ	TEX	PHO	HOM	N/A	-
2009	Justin Lofton	14	Toyota	DAY	CAL	LVS	BRI	TEX	NSH	PHO	TAL	RCH	DAR	CLT	DOV	NSH	KEN	MLW	NHA	DAY	CHI	GTY	IRP	IOW	GLN	MCH; 16	BRI	CGV	ATL	RCH	DOV	KAN	CAL	CLT	MEM	TEX	PHO	HOM	70th	115

== Suspending operations ==
On December 18, 2009, the team announced that it would suspend operations for 2010.
