= Red Horse Racing =

Former NASCAR team

- Owner(s): Jeff Hammond; Tom DeLoach
- Base: Mooresville, North Carolina
- Series: Camping World Truck Series
- Race drivers: 7. Brett Moffitt; 17. Timothy Peters
- Manufacturer: Toyota
- Opened: 2004
- Closed: 2017

Career
- Debut: Camping World Truck Series: 2005 Florida Dodge Dealers 250 (Daytona)
- Latest race: Camping World Truck Series: 2017 North Carolina Education Lottery 200 (Charlotte)
- Races competed: Total: 533; Nationwide Series: 1 Camping World Truck Series: 532
- Drivers' Championships: Total: 0 Nationwide Series: 0 Camping World Truck Series: 0
- Race victories: Total: 16; Nationwide Series: 0 Camping World Truck Series: 16
- Pole positions: Total: 14; Nationwide Series: 0 Camping World Truck Series: 14

Red Horse Racing was an American professional stock car racing team that last competed in the NASCAR Camping World Truck Series. The team was based in Mooresville, North Carolina. It was co-owned by former Mobil 1 marketing executive Tom DeLoach and Fox NASCAR broadcaster Jeff Hammond, who bought the team from the family team of Brandon Whitt, Clean Line Motorsports. The team last fielded the No. 7 Toyota Tundra full-time for Brett Moffitt, and the No. 17 Tundra full-time for Timothy Peters. The team was known for often having no sponsors on their trucks despite fielding multiple competitive full-time entries for many seasons. This situation could only last so long as on May 22, 2017, DeLoach announced that the team would shut down effective immediately due to a lack of funding.

== Camping World Truck Series ==
=== Truck No. 1 history ===
The No.1 team originated in 2009 at Daytona with 2008 Truck Series champion, Johnny Benson behind the wheel. Benson would score 4 Top 10 finishes with a best of 2nd at Kansas. He would be released after a 4th place finish at Texas due to lack of sponsorship. He was 7th in the Standings. Caitlyn Shaw would drive the No. 1 at Indianapolis Raceway Park to a 24th place finish. Timothy Peters would move from his usual No. 17 to the No. 1 to win the Kroger 200 at Martinsville Speedway.

==== Truck No. 1 results ====
Year	Driver	No.	Make	1	2	3	4	5	6	7	8	9	10	11	12	13	14	15	16	17	18	19	20	21	22	23	24	25	NCWTC	Pts
2007	Aaron Fike	1	Toyota	DAY; 16	CAL; 18	ATL; 12	MAR; 7	KAN; 8	CLT; 14	MFD; 24	DOV; 10	TEX; 11	MCH; 17	MLW; 21	MEM; 5														8th	3120
2007	David Green	1	Toyota													KEN; 5	IRP; 15	NSH; 14	BRI; 16	GTW; 20	NHA; 19	LVS; 18							8th	3120
2007	Jason Leffler	1	Toyota																				TAL; 4	MAR; 23		TEX; 9	PHO; 4	HOM; 5	8th	3120
2007	Brandon Whitt	1	Toyota																						ATL; 23				8th	3120
2009	Caitlin Shaw	1	Toyota	DAY	CAL	ATL	MAR	KAN	CLT	DOV	TEX	MCH	MLW	MEM	KEN	IRP; 24	NSH	BRI	CHI	IOW	GTW	NHA	LVS	MAR	TAL	TEX	PHO	HOM	70th	91

=== Truck No. 7 history ===
The No. 7 team originated in 2012, when John King drove the No. 7 to win the NextEra Energy 250, despite him being in two crashes. On March 23, 2015, Gray Gaulding joined the team on a limited schedule, making his debut at Martinsville. That race would be his only start with the team. The No. 7 took the place of the No. 11 entry in 2017, with Brett Moffitt driving.

==== Truck No. 7 results ====
Year	Driver	No.	Make	1	2	3	4	5	6	7	8	9	10	11	12	13	14	15	16	17	18	19	20	21	22	23	24	25	NCWTC	Pts
2010	Justin Lofton	7	Toyota	DAY; 18	ATL; 20	MAR; 31	NSH; 20	KAN; 13	DOV; 3	CLT; 15	TEX; 23	MCH; 18	IOW; 15	GTY; 27	IRP; 29	POC; 5	NSH; 9	DAR; 20	BRI; 5	CHI; 5	KEN; 11	NHA; 11	LVS; 8	MAR; 13	TAL; 33	TEX; 22	PHO; 9	HOM; 9	12th	2948
2011	Miguel Paludo	7	Toyota	DAY; 4	PHO; 25	DAR; 27	MAR; 12	NSH; 27	DOV; 28	CLT; 35	KAN; 13	TEX; 8	KEN; 21	IOW; 15	NSH; 14	IRP; 4	POC; 19	MCH; 3	BRI; 31	ATL; 22	CHI; 8	NHA; 10	KEN; 25	LVS; 27	TAL; 18	MAR; 16	TEX; 9	HOM; 31	20th	651
2012	John King	7	Toyota	DAY; 1	MAR; 9	CAR; 33	KAN; 13	CLT; 33	DOV	TEX	KEN	IOW	CHI	POC															18th	530
2012	Parker Kligerman	7	Toyota												MCH; 4	BRI; 2	ATL; 4	IOW; 23*	KEN; 2	LVS; 19	TAL; 1	MAR; 9	TEX; 2	PHO; 27	HOM; 7				18th	530
2013	John Wes Townley	7	Toyota	DAY; 21	MAR; 32	CAR; 11	KAN; 32	CLT; 8	DOV; 11	TEX; 15	KEN; 11	IOW; 12	ELD; 22	POC; 17	MCH; 7	BRI; 30	MSP; 12	IOW; 11	CHI; 6	LVS; 7	TAL; 7	MAR; 13	TEX; 9	PHO; 27	HOM; 6				14th	641
2014	Brian Ickler	7	Toyota	DAY; 33	MAR; 10	KAN; 27	CLT; 23	DOV	TEX	GTW	KEN	IOW	ELD	POC	MCH	BRI	MSP	CHI	NHA	LVS; 5	TAL	MAR	TEX	PHO	HOM				34th	122
2015	Gray Gaulding	7	Toyota	DAY	ATL	MAR; 17	KAN	CLT	DOV	TEX	GTW	IOW	KEN	ELD	POC	MCH	BRI	MSP	CHI	NHA	LVS	TAL	MAR	TEX	PHO	HOM			52nd	27
2017	Brett Moffitt	7	Toyota	DAY; 22	ATL; 11	MAR; 6	KAN; 7	CLT; 18	DOV	TEX	GTW	IOW	KEN	ELD	POC	MCH	BRI	MSP	CHI	NHA	LVS	TAL	MAR	TEX	PHO	HOM			33rd	126

=== Truck No. 11 history ===
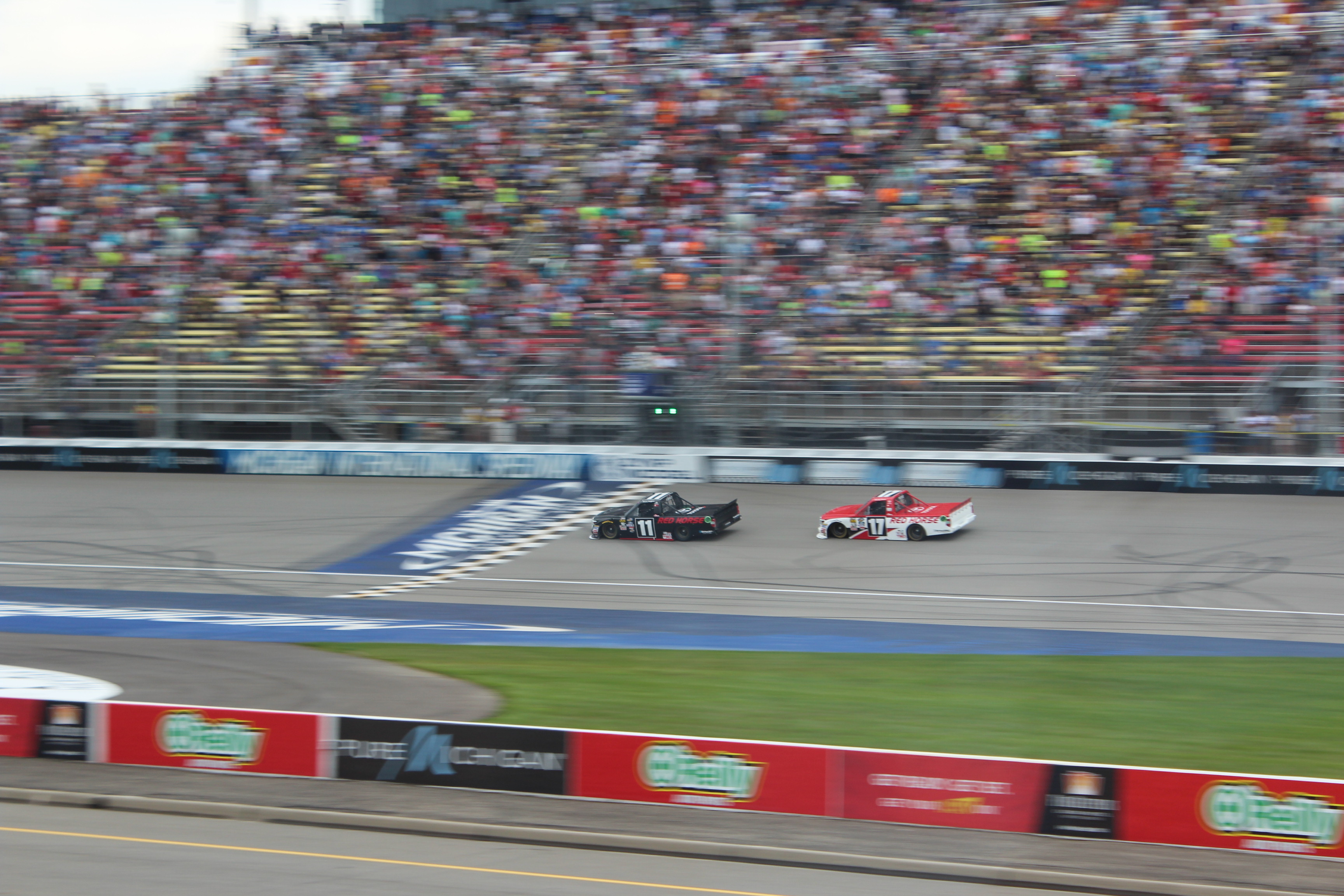
Red Horse teammates Brett Moffitt (No. 11) and Timothy Peters (No. 17) finishing 1–2 in the 2016 Careers for Veterans 200 at Michigan International Speedway

The No. 11 truck debuted in 2009 as the No. 1 truck with defending champion Johnny Benson at the wheel. On June 8, 2009, the team announced that the No. 1 truck would be shut down due to a lack of sponsorship, leaving Benson without a ride to defend the title he won in 2008. Peters would join Red Horse after the Texas race after merging his team, Premier Racing with Red Horse. The team returned in 2010 as the No. 7 Tundra, fielding 2009 ARCA RE/MAX Series champion Justin Lofton who competed for Rookie of the Year honors. Lofton would finish second to Austin Dillon in ROTY points, but was released at season's end. He was replaced by Brazil native Miguel Paludo, who brought sponsorship from Stemco Duroline. Paludo managed a few top tens but was outpaced mostly by Peters. Paludo left after 2011 to join Turner Motorsports. Paludo was replaced by rookie John King for the 2012 season. During the first race of the season, the NextEra Energy Resources 250, King won his first Camping World Truck Series race. After the first five races, Red Horse was forced to shut down the No. 7 team due to a lack of sponsorship. The team was revived to field Parker Kligerman after his release from Brad Keselowski Racing. Kligerman would score his first career win at Talladega and finished 5th in points. Kligerman moved up to the Nationwide Series with Kyle Busch Motorsports, and would be replaced by John Wes Townley for 2013. As Townley moved to the Wauters Motorsports No. 5 Zaxby's Toyota Tundra for 2014, Brian Ickler took over the seat of the No. 7 truck with Bullet Liner as the primary sponsor. However, on May 20, the team announced the No. 7 will be suspended due to lack of funding, and to increase focus on Quiroga and Peters' teams. Ickler returned for one-race deal in Las Vegas.

On December 17, 2014, Red Horse announced Ben Kennedy would drive in 2015, reviving the No. 11. Kennedy left the team on April 15, 2016. Five days later, Matt Tifft was announced as Kennedy's replacement in the No. 11. Tifft would run a few races before being sidelined with disc problem in his back, as well as having surgery to remove a tumor in his brain. German Quiroga drove at Texas in June. Brett Moffitt also drove the No. 11 and won his first career Camping World Truck Series race at Michigan, passing his teammate Timothy Peters and William Byron on the final lap of the race.

==== Truck No. 11 results ====
Year	Driver	No.	Make	1	2	3	4	5	6	7	8	9	10	11	12	13	14	15	16	17	18	19	20	21	22	23	24	25	NCWTC	Pts
2003	Brandon Whitt	38	Chevy	DAY	DAR	MMR; 19	MAR	CLT	DOV	TEX	MEM	MLW	KAN; 26	KEN; 30	GTW	MCH	IRP	NSH	BRI	RCH	NHA	CAL; 13	LVS; 26	SBO	TEX; 34	MAR	PHO	HOM; 35	42nd	592
2004	Brandon Whitt	38	Ford	DAY; 22	ATL; 20	MAR; 14	MFD; 18	CLT; 18	DOV; 31	TEX; 22	MEM; 15	MLW; 15	KAN; 23	KEN; 14	GTW; 23	MCH; 28	IRP; 20	NSH; 17	BRI; 31	RCH; 17	NHA; 19	LVS; 13	CAL; 35	TEX; 15	MAR; 12	PHO; 20	DAR; 14	HOM; 26	22nd	2569
2005	Brandon Whitt	38	Toyota	DAY; 28	CAL; 23	ATL; 15	MAR; 29	GTY; 33	MFD; 30	CLT; 23	DOV; 32	TEX; 15	MCH; 34	MLW; 13	KAN; 16	KEN; 6	MEM; 1	IRP; 24	NSH; 23	BRI; 20	RCH; 33	NHA; 27	LVS; 9	MAR; 3	ATL; 8	TEX; 15	PHO; 19	HOM; 29	21st	2602
2006	David Starr	11	Toyota	DAY; 14	CAL; 12	ATL; 15	MAR; 1*	GTY; 8	CLT; 26	MFD; 3	DOV; 11	TEX; 18	MCH; 13	MLW; 8	KAN; 8	KEN; 8	MEM; 11	IRP; 4	NSH; 20	BRI; 5	NHA; 5	LVS; 20	TAL; 24	MAR; 2	ATL; 11	TEX; 16	PHO; 6	HOM; 7	5th	3355
2008	David Starr	11	Toyota	DAY; 4	CAL; 13	ATL; 21	MAR; 6	KAN; 27	CLT; 17	MFD; 2*	DOV; 6	TEX; 27	MCH; 26	MLW; 23	MEM; 5	KEN; 5	IRP; 16	NSH; 9	BRI; 29	GTW; 28	NHA; 7	LVS; 22	TAL; 19	MAR; 33	ATL; 14	TEX; 12	PHO; 13	HOM; 22	14th	2929
2009	T. J. Bell	11	Toyota	DAY; 11	CAL; 5	ATL; 12	MAR; 31	KAN; 22	CLT; 30	DOV; 23	TEX; 14	MCH; 18	MLW; 28	MEM; 18	KEN; 23	IRP; 15	NSH; 10	BRI; 8	CHI; 15	IOW; 7	GTW; 24	NHA; 12	LVS; 12	MAR; 30	TAL; 29	TEX; 23	PHO; 13	HOM; 10	19th	2767
2010	Nelson Piquet Jr.	1	Toyota	DAY; 6	ATL	MAR	NSH	KAN	DOV	CLT	TEX	MCH	IOW	GTY	IRP	POC	NSH	DAR	BRI	CHI	KEN	NHA	LVS	MAR	TAL				48th	352
2010	Miguel Paludo	11	Toyota																							TEX; 33	PHO	HOM; 9	48th	352
2012	Todd Bodine	11	Toyota	DAY; 6	MAR; 25	CAR; 31	KAN; 5	CLT; 3	DOV; 1	TEX; 30	KEN; 28	IOW; 12	CHI; 18	POC; 26	MCH; 24	BRI; 31	ATL; 21	IOW; 3	KEN; 30	LVS; 5	TAL; 33	MAR; 22	TEX; 8	PHO; 28	HOM; 11				16th	574
2015	Ben Kennedy	11	Toyota	DAY; 28	ATL; 3	MAR; 19	KAN; 26	CLT; 16	DOV; 6	TEX; 10	GTW; 7	IOW; 13	KEN; 16	ELD; 12	POC; 11	MCH; 25	BRI; 15	MSP; 3	CHI; 12	NHA; 23	LVS; 3	TAL; 25	MAR; 14	TEX; 9	PHO; 24	HOM; 4			14th	690
2016	Ben Kennedy	11	Toyota	DAY; 23	ATL; 15	MAR; 11																							7th	2150
2016	Matt Tifft	11	Toyota				KAN; 14	DOV; 12	CLT; 5										CHI; 12		LVS; 15	TAL; 9	MAR; 16	TEX; 17	PHO; 8	HOM; 12			7th	2150
2016	Germán Quiroga	11	Toyota							TEX; 8	IOW; 14	GTW; 7																	7th	2150
2016	Brett Moffitt	11	Toyota										KEN; 31		POC; 3	BRI; 2	MCH; 1	MSP; 16		NHA; 8									7th	2150
2016	Jake Griffin	11	Toyota											ELD; 4															7th	2150

=== Truck No. 17 history ===
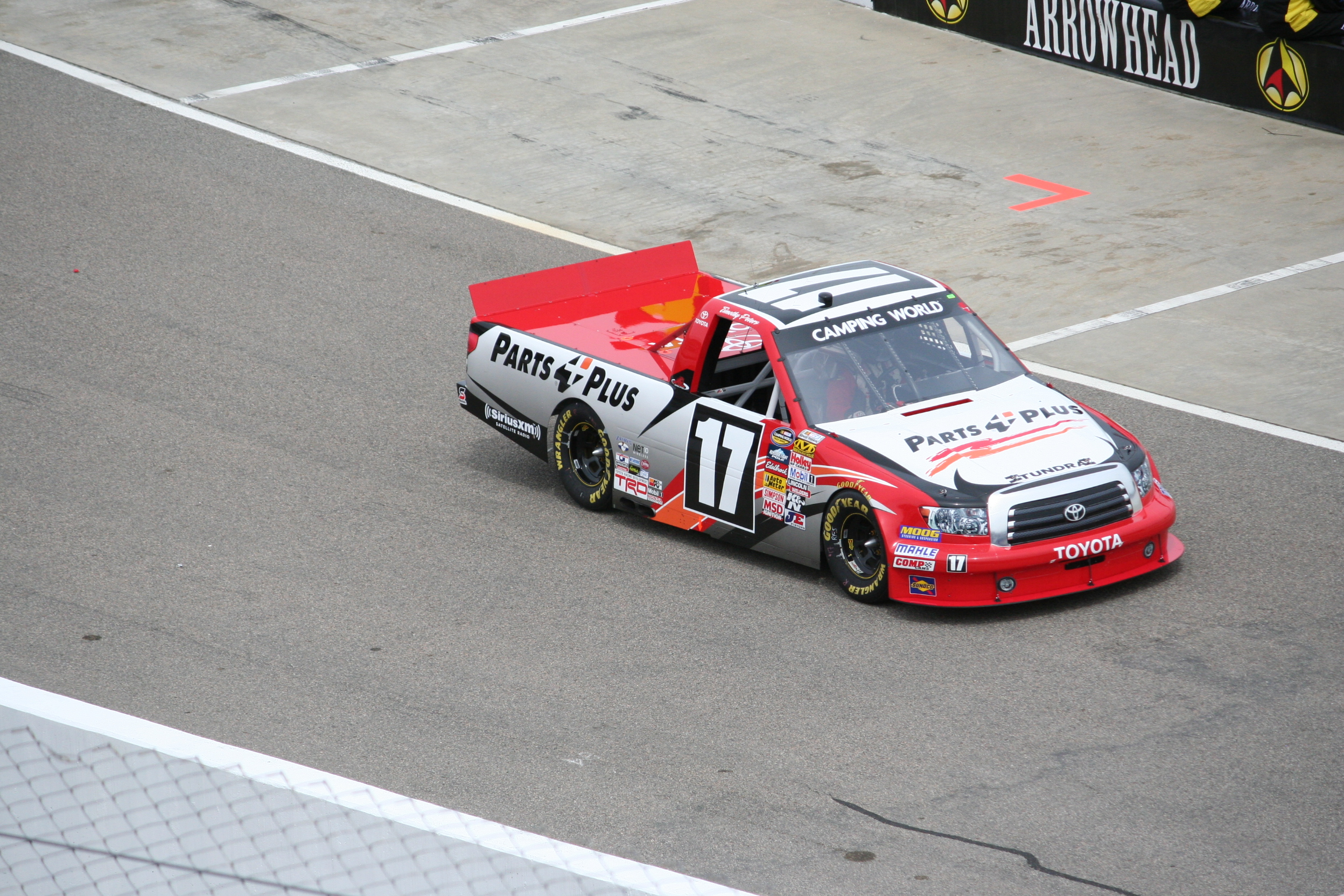
Timothy Peters driving the No. 17 truck at Rockingham Speedway

Midway through 2009, Timothy Peters joined RHR from Premier Racing with Strutmasters sponsorship, and earned his first win at Martinsville Speedway. Peters returned to the team in 2010 and scored his second win at Daytona en route to finishing 6th in points for the year. Peters returned to the team for 2011 but had Butch Hylton as crew chief. The team won at Lucas Oil Raceway at Indianapolis and finished fifth in points. For 2012, Peters stayed in the top 5 in points for the whole season scoring wins at Iowa and leading flag-to-flag at Bristol. Peters would finish 2nd in points. In 2013, Peters had a rough season, finishing 10th in points only winning at Iowa. He rebounded the following year, leading the point standings for three weeks in the early stages of the year and triumphing at Talladega Superspeedway en route to a fifth place finish in points. Taking on a leadership role within the organization in 2015 as the veteran on the team, Peters rebounded from early-season struggles to record two wins (one from the pole) and again finish fifth in points. Driving alongside a varying driver rotation in 2016, Peters qualified for the inaugural Truck Series Chase, made it to the final round, and finished fourth.

==== Truck No. 17 results ====
Year	Driver	No.	Make	1	2	3	4	5	6	7	8	9	10	11	12	13	14	15	16	17	18	19	20	21	22	23	24	25	NCWTC	Pts
2009	Johnny Benson Jr.	1	Toyota	DAY; 26	CAL; 12	ATL; 9	MAR; 4	KAN; 2	CLT; 23	DOV; 20	TEX; 4																		5th	3433
2009	Timothy Peters	17	Toyota									MCH; 8	MLW; 18	MEM; 7	KEN; 4	IRP; 17	NSH; 4	BRI; 10	CHI; 9	IOW; 8	GTW; 7	NHA; 19	LVS; 5		TAL; 11	TEX; 19	PHO; 16	HOM; 4	5th	3433
2009	Timothy Peters	1	Toyota																					MAR; 1*					5th	3433
2010	Timothy Peters	17	Toyota	DAY; 1	ATL; 7	MAR; 4	NSH; 4	KAN; 23	DOV; 25	CLT; 10	TEX; 7	MCH; 6	IOW; 27	GTY; 6	IRP; 10	POC; 8	NSH; 4	DAR; 2	BRI; 8	CHI; 21	KEN; 6	NHA; 6	LVS; 26	MAR; 34	TAL; 7	TEX; 12	PHO; 13	HOM; 17	8th	3343
2011	Timothy Peters	17	Toyota	DAY; 11	PHO; 12	DAR; 6	MAR; 5	NSH; 3	DOV; 17	CLT; 32	KAN; 14	TEX; 20	KEN; 16	IOW; 11	NSH; 3	IRP; 1	POC; 10	MCH; 2	BRI; 5	ATL; 16	CHI; 17	NHA; 9	KEN; 17	LVS; 3	TAL; 23	MAR; 8	TEX; 11	HOM; 8	6th	832
2012	Timothy Peters	17	Toyota	DAY; 2	MAR; 5	CAR; 5	KAN; 2	CLT; 9	DOV; 9	TEX; 11	KEN; 5	IOW; 1*	CHI; 3	POC; 22	MCH; 13	BRI; 1*	ATL; 13	IOW; 19	KEN; 21	LVS; 8	TAL; 5	MAR; 7	TEX; 10	PHO; 4	HOM; 8				2nd	802
2013	Timothy Peters	17	Toyota	DAY; 27	MAR; 4	CAR; 26	KAN; 10	CLT; 26	DOV; 6	TEX; 14	KEN; 6	IOW; 1	ELD; 6	POC; 14	MCH; 6	BRI; 2*	MSP; 8	IOW; 12	CHI; 27	LVS; 1	TAL; 29	MAR; 26	TEX; 16	PHO; 16	HOM; 9				12th	683
2014	Timothy Peters	17	Toyota	DAY; 2	MAR; 6	KAN; 14	CLT; 5	DOV; 10	TEX; 24	GTW; 3	KEN; 4	IOW; 31	ELD; 16	POC; 12	MCH; 7	BRI; 26	MSP; 10	CHI; 17	NHA; 11	LVS; 4	TAL; 1*	MAR; 2	TEX; 3	PHO; 19	HOM; 3				8th	746
2015	Timothy Peters	17	Toyota	DAY; 24	ATL; 9	MAR; 18	KAN; 4	CLT; 7	DOV; 20	TEX; 21	GTW; 6	IOW; 6	KEN; 5	ELD; 23	POC; 7	MCH; 8	BRI; 12	MSP; 22	CHI; 3	NHA; 4	LVS; 2	TAL; 1	MAR; 6	TEX; 6	PHO; 1	HOM; 5			5th	804
2016	Timothy Peters	17	Toyota	DAY; 15	ATL; 3	MAR; 5	KAN; 8	DOV; 14	CLT; 7	TEX; 6	IOW; 11	GTW; 10	KEN; 9	ELD; 27	POC; 4	BRI; 13	MCH; 2*	MSP; 18	CHI; 8	NHA; 5	LVS; 9	TAL; 3	MAR; 5	TEX; 14	PHO; 5	HOM; 9			9th	558
2017	Timothy Peters	17	Toyota	DAY; 17	ATL; 9	MAR; 8	KAN; 13	CLT; 5	DOV	TEX	GTW	IOW	KEN	ELD	POC	MCH	BRI	MSP	CHI	NHA	LVS	TAL	MAR	TEX	PHO	HOM			30th	170

=== Truck No. 77 history ===
Red Horse Racing debuted in 2004 as Clean Line Motorsports. It was owned by Daniel Whitt and fielded the No. 38 Ford for his son Brandon. The team debuted at Mesa Marin Speedway finishing 19th. Clean Line was purchased by retired Mobil Oil executive Tom DeLoach, and championship crew chief/sports commentator Jeff Hammond eight races into the 2005 season and was renamed Red Horse Racing. Whitt grabbed the team's first win at Memphis from the pole.

For the 2006 season, David Starr, former driver of the No. 75 Spears Chevy Silverado, drove the team's Toyotas, which switched from No. 38 to No. 11. Starr then won the fourth race of the season at Martinsville and finished fourth in the standings. Despite their success, the team was forced to release Starr at the end of the year due to a lack of sponsorship. He was replaced by Aaron Fike in 2007, and the team switched numbers again, to No. 1. After Fike was arrested in Ohio for drug use, Busch Series drivers David Green and Jason Leffler rounded out the season for the team, and Whitt returned at Atlanta. For 2008, David Starr returned to RHR after departing for Circle Bar Racing, with the team running the No. 11. The team's reunion would garner them four top fives and eight top tens but only a 12th-place points finish. Starr would again depart the team, taking new sponsor Zachry Holdings with him to HT Motorsports. Red Horse would bring along former ARCA driver T. J. Bell, who had five top-tens and finished fifteenth in points. The team switched to the No. 1 and hired former Formula 1 driver Nelson Piquet Jr. briefly. The team returned as the No. 11 truck in 2012, with Todd Bodine. Though the deal was originally intended for Daytona, the team ran the full season with limited sponsorship, with Bodine returning to victory lane at Dover. At the end of the season, Bodine was unable to come up with the sponsorship to return, and left the team.

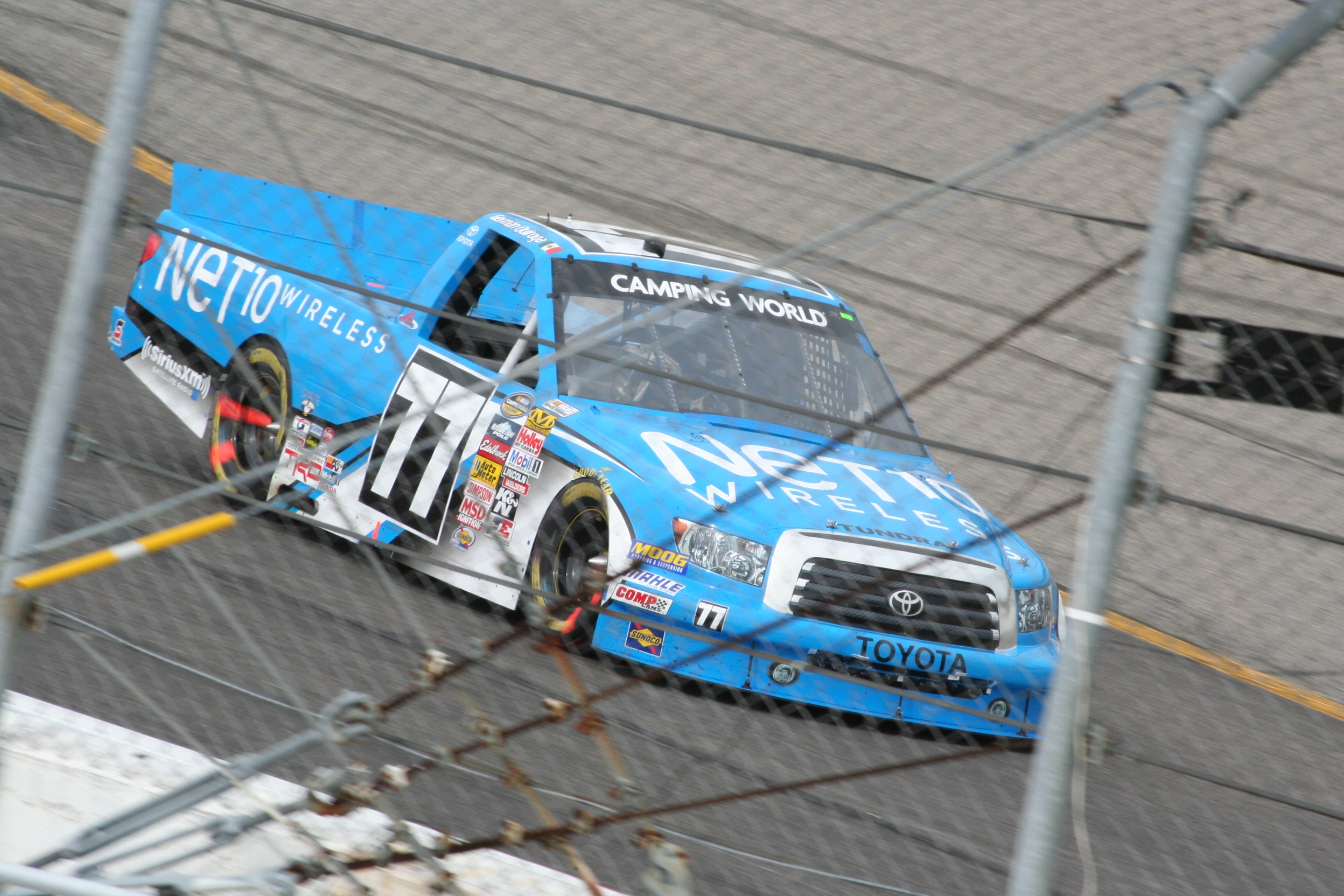
Germán Quiroga in 2013.

For 2013, 3-time NASCAR Toyota Series champion Germán Quiroga would replace Bodine in the renumbered 77 truck, with Net10 Wireless sponsoring 12 races. OtterBox would sign on as a nine race sponsor in June. In July, Quiroga became the first Mexican-born driver to win a pole in a NASCAR national series race, breaking the Truck Series qualifying record at Iowa Speedway. Quiroga earned two third-place finishes and six total top tens to finish 13th in points.

Quiroga returned to the 77 truck in 2014 with veteran crew chief Butch Hylton, and came close to winning on several occasions. In June, Quiroga battled Bubba Wallace in the closing laps at Gateway Motorsports Park, ultimately finishing second. In August, Quiroga would battle Ryan Blaney at Canadian Tire Motorsports Park, passing Blaney through the final two turns before Blaney got back around him on the front stretch. At Martinsville in October, Quiroga made a daring three-wide pass with 13 laps to go, spinning out and settling for 10th place. At Texas in November, Quiroga led 12 laps late in the race before being passed by Kyle Busch on a green-white-checker restart, then spinning out racing his teammate Timothy Peters on the last lap. Quiroga scored three top fives and 10 top tens en route to a 6th-place points finish. Quiroga didn't return with Red Horse Racing in 2015, and moving the No. 77 points to the No. 11 points.

==== Truck No. 77 results ====
Year	Driver	No.	Make	1	2	3	4	5	6	7	8	9	10	11	12	13	14	15	16	17	18	19	20	21	22	NCWTC	Pts
2013	Germán Quiroga	77	Toyota	DAY; 25	MAR; 29	CAR; 19	KAN; 11	CLT; 35	DOV; 13	TEX; 3	KEN; 8	IOW; 14	ELD; 20	POC; 3	MCH; 19	BRI; 21	MSP; 15	IOW; 6	CHI; 14	LVS; 21	TAL; 31	MAR; 7	TEX; 14	PHO; 12	HOM; 7	16th	625
2014	Germán Quiroga	77	Toyota	DAY; 10	MAR; 6	KAN; 7	CLT; 9	DOV; 9	TEX; 23	GTY; 2	KEN; 15	IOW; 5	ELD; 12	POC; 22	MCH; 6	BRI; 14	MSP; 2	CHI; 19	NHA; 15	LVS; 16	TAL; 29	MAR; 10	TEX; 17	PHO; 26	HOM; 15	10th	683

== Nationwide Series ==
=== Car No. 71 history ===
The team has made one Nationwide Series start with Truck Series driver, Justin Lofton in the No. 71 WeekendWarriorsTV.com Toyota Camry at Texas Motor Speedway in the 2010 O'Reilly 300 and finished 37th after starting 31st.
