= 2017 Active Pest Control 200 =

Second race of the 2017 NASCAR Camping World Truck Series

Race details
- Race 2 of 23 of the 2017 NASCAR Camping World Truck Series
- Date: March 4, 2017
- Official name: Ninth Annual Active Pest Control 200
- Location: Hampton, Georgia, Atlanta Motor Speedway
- Course: Permanent racing facility
- Course length: 1.54 miles (2.48 km)
- Distance: 130 laps, 200.2 mi (322.19 km)
- Scheduled distance: 130 laps, 200.2 mi (322.19 km)
- Average speed: 108.477 miles per hour (174.577 km/h)

Pole position
Driver	Christopher Bell	Kyle Busch Motorsports
- Time: 30.643

Most laps led
Driver	Christopher Bell	Kyle Busch Motorsports
- Laps: 99

Winner
No. 4	Christopher Bell	Kyle Busch Motorsports

Television in the United States
- Network: Fox Sports 1
- Announcers: Vince Welch, Phil Parsons, Michael Waltrip

Radio in the United States
- Radio: Motor Racing Network

The 2017 Active Pest Control 200 was the second stock car race of the 2017 NASCAR Camping World Truck Series and the ninth iteration of the event. The race was held on Saturday, March 4, 2017, in Hampton, Georgia at Atlanta Motor Speedway, a 1.54 miles (2.48 km) permanent asphalt quad-oval intermediate speedway. The race took the scheduled 130 laps to complete. At race's end, Christopher Bell, driving for Kyle Busch Motorsports, would defend the field on a restart with two to go to complete a dominant performance for the race and secure a win. The win was Bell's third career NASCAR Camping World Truck Series win and his first of the season. To fill out the podium, Matt Crafton of ThorSport Racing and Johnny Sauter of GMS Racing would finish second and third, respectively.

== Background ==
The layout of Atlanta Motor Speedway, the venue where the race was held.

Atlanta Motor Speedway (formerly Atlanta International Raceway) is a track in Hampton, Georgia, 20 miles (32 km) south of Atlanta. It is a 1.54-mile (2.48 km) quad-oval track with a seating capacity of 111,000. It opened in 1960 as a 1.5-mile (2.4 km) standard oval. In 1994, 46 condominiums were built over the northeastern side of the track. In 1997, to standardize the track with Speedway Motorsports' other two 1.5-mile (2.4 km) ovals, the entire track was almost completely rebuilt. The frontstretch and backstretch were swapped, and the configuration of the track was changed from oval to quad-oval. The project made the track one of the fastest on the NASCAR circuit.

=== Entry list ===
- (R) denotes rookie driver.
- (i) denotes driver who is ineligible for series driver points.

#	Driver	Team	Make	Sponsor
1	Mike Harmon (i)	TJL Motorsports	Chevrolet	TJL Motorsports
02	Austin Hill	Young's Motorsports	Ford	Don Rich Ford
4	Christopher Bell	Kyle Busch Motorsports	Toyota	JBL
5	Korbin Forrister	Wauters Motorsports	Toyota	Advanced Medical Laboratories
6	Norm Benning	Norm Benning Racing	Chevrolet	Houston Roll Pipe
7	Brett Moffitt	Red Horse Racing	Toyota	Red Horse Racing
8	John Hunter Nemechek	NEMCO Motorsports	Chevrolet	NEMCO Motorsports
10	Jennifer Jo Cobb	Jennifer Jo Cobb Racing	Chevrolet	Driven 2 Honor
12	Jordan Anderson	Rick Ware Racing	Chevrolet	Lucas Oil
13	Cody Coughlin (R)	ThorSport Racing	Toyota	JEGS
16	Ryan Truex	Hattori Racing Enterprises	Toyota	SeaWatch International, Bar Harbor
17	Timothy Peters	Red Horse Racing	Toyota	Red Horse Racing
18	Noah Gragson (R)	Kyle Busch Motorsports	Toyota	Switch
19	Austin Cindric (R)	Brad Keselowski Racing	Ford	Reese Brands, Draw-Tite
21	Johnny Sauter	GMS Racing	Chevrolet	Allegiant Air
22	Austin Wayne Self*	AM Racing	Toyota	AM Technical Solutions
23	Chase Elliott (i)	GMS Racing	Chevrolet	Allegiant Air
24	Alex Bowman (i)	GMS Racing	Chevrolet	Fraternal Order of Eagles
27	Ben Rhodes	ThorSport Racing	Toyota	Safelite Auto Glass
29	Chase Briscoe (R)	Brad Keselowski Racing	Ford	Cooper-Standard
33	Kaz Grala (R)	GMS Racing	Chevrolet	Kiklos
44	Tommy Joe Martins	Martins Motorsports	Chevrolet	Martins Motorsports
45	T. J. Bell	Niece Motorsports	Chevrolet	Xcalibur Pit School
49	Wendell Chavous (R)	Premium Motorsports	Chevrolet	Dirt & Rock
50	Akinori Ogata	Beaver Motorsports	Chevrolet	Kajima Building & Design Group, Nisshinbo
51	Kyle Busch (i)	Kyle Busch Motorsports	Toyota	Cessna, Beechcraft
52	Stewart Friesen (R)	Halmar Friesen Racing	Chevrolet	Halmar
63	J. J. Yeley (i)	MB Motorsports	Chevrolet	MB Motorsports
66	Ross Chastain (i)	Bolen Motorsports	Chevrolet	Bolen Motorsports
75	Parker Kligerman	Henderson Motorsports	Toyota	Food Country USA, Frito-Lay
83	Todd Peck	Copp Motorsports	Chevrolet	Copp Motorsports
87	Joe Nemechek	NEMCO Motorsports	Chevrolet	D. A. B. Constructors, Inc.
88	Matt Crafton	ThorSport Racing	Toyota	Menards, Ideal Door
92	Regan Smith	RBR Enterprises	Ford	BTS Tire & Wheel Distributors, Advance Auto Parts
98	Grant Enfinger (R)	ThorSport Racing	Toyota	RIDE TV
99	Austin Dillon (i)	MDM Motorsports	Chevrolet	Overkill Motorsports
Official entry list

*Withdrew.

== Practice ==
=== First practice ===
The first practice session was held on Friday, March 3, at 11:00 a.m. EST, and would last for 55 minutes. Chase Briscoe of Brad Keselowski Racing would set the fastest time in the session, with a lap of 30.616 and an average speed of 181.082 miles per hour (291.423 km/h).

Pos.	#	Driver	Team	Make	Time	Speed
1	29	Chase Briscoe (R)	Brad Keselowski Racing	Ford	30.616	181.082
2	18	Noah Gragson (R)	Kyle Busch Motorsports	Toyota	30.820	179.883
3	24	Alex Bowman (i)	GMS Racing	Chevrolet	30.901	179.412
Full first practice results

=== Second practice ===
The second practice session was held on Friday, March 3, at 2:30 p.m. EST, and would last for 55 minutes. Christopher Bell of Kyle Busch Motorsports would set the fastest time in the session, with a lap of 30.739 and an average speed of 180.357 miles per hour (290.256 km/h).

Pos.	#	Driver	Team	Make	Time	Speed
1	4	Christopher Bell	Kyle Busch Motorsports	Toyota	30.739	180.357
2	21	Johnny Sauter	GMS Racing	Chevrolet	30.801	179.994
3	29	Chase Briscoe (R)	Brad Keselowski Racing	Ford	31.127	178.109
Full second practice results

=== Third and final practice ===
The third and final practice session, sometimes referred to as Happy Hour, was held on Friday, March 3, at 4:30 p.m. EST, and would last for 55 minutes. Chase Elliott of GMS Racing would set the fastest time in the session, with a lap of 30.876 and an average speed of 179.557 miles per hour (288.969 km/h).

Pos.	#	Driver	Team	Make	Time	Speed
1	23	Chase Elliott (i)	GMS Racing	Chevrolet	30.876	179.557
2	29	Chase Briscoe (R)	Brad Keselowski Racing	Ford	30.959	179.076
3	4	Christopher Bell	Kyle Busch Motorsports	Toyota	30.983	178.937
Full Happy Hour practice results

== Qualifying ==
Qualifying was held on Saturday, March 4, at 10:40 a.m. EST. Since Atlanta Motor Speedway is at least a 1.5 miles (2.4 km) racetrack, the qualifying system was a single car, single lap, two round system where in the first round, everyone would set a time to determine positions 13–32. Then, the fastest 12 qualifiers would move on to the second round to determine positions 1–12.

Christopher Bell of Kyle Busch Motorsports would win the pole, setting a lap of 30.643 and an average speed of 180.922 miles per hour (291.166 km/h) in the second round.

Three drivers would fail to qualify: J. J. Yeley, Norm Benning, and Jennifer Jo Cobb.

=== Full qualifying results ===
Pos.	#	Driver	Team	Make	Time (R1)	Speed (R1)	Time (R2)	Speed (R2)
1	4	Christopher Bell	Kyle Busch Motorsports	Toyota			30.643	180.922
2	51	Kyle Busch (i)	Kyle Busch Motorsports	Toyota			30.782	180.105
3	19	Austin Cindric (R)	Brad Keselowski Racing	Ford			30.817	179.901
4	29	Chase Briscoe (R)	Brad Keselowski Racing	Ford			30.851	179.702
5	24	Alex Bowman (i)	GMS Racing	Chevrolet			30.876	179.557
6	21	Johnny Sauter	GMS Racing	Chevrolet			30.908	179.371
7	88	Matt Crafton	ThorSport Racing	Toyota			30.925	179.272
8	17	Timothy Peters	Red Horse Racing	Toyota			30.929	179.249
9	23	Chase Elliott (i)	GMS Racing	Chevrolet			30.940	179.186
10	18	Noah Gragson (R)	Kyle Busch Motorsports	Toyota			30.973	178.995
11	8	John Hunter Nemechek	NEMCO Motorsports	Chevrolet			31.015	178.752
12	33	Kaz Grala (R)	GMS Racing	Chevrolet			31.087	178.338
Eliminated in Round 1
13	7	Brett Moffitt	Red Horse Racing	Toyota	31.032	178.654	—	—
14	98	Grant Enfinger (R)	ThorSport Racing	Toyota	31.089	178.327	—	—
15	27	Ben Rhodes	ThorSport Racing	Toyota	31.144	178.012	—	—
16	13	Cody Coughlin (R)	ThorSport Racing	Toyota	31.187	177.766	—	—
17	5	Korbin Forrister	Wauters Motorsports	Toyota	31.199	177.698	—	—
18	99	Austin Dillon (i)	MDM Motorsports	Chevrolet	31.258	177.363	—	—
19	75	Parker Kligerman	Henderson Motorsports	Toyota	31.258	177.363	—	—
20	52	Stewart Friesen (R)	Halmar Friesen Racing	Chevrolet	31.269	177.300	—	—
21	16	Ryan Truex	Hattori Racing Enterprises	Toyota	31.296	177.147	—	—
22	87	Joe Nemechek	NEMCO Motorsports	Chevrolet	31.317	177.028	—	—
23	92	Regan Smith	RBR Enterprises	Ford	31.473	176.151	—	—
24	66	Ross Chastain (i)	Bolen Motorsports	Chevrolet	31.505	175.972	—	—
25	45	T. J. Bell	Niece Motorsports	Chevrolet	31.591	175.493	—	—
26	44	Tommy Joe Martins	Martins Motorsports	Chevrolet	31.595	175.471	—	—
27	02	Austin Hill	Young's Motorsports	Ford	31.696	174.912	—	—
Qualified by owner's points
28	12	Jordan Anderson	Rick Ware Racing	Chevrolet	32.289	171.699	—	—
29	83	Todd Peck	Copp Motorsports	Chevrolet	32.390	171.164	—	—
30	49	Wendell Chavous (R)	Premium Motorsports	Chevrolet	32.588	170.124	—	—
31	1	Mike Harmon (i)	TJL Motorsports	Chevrolet	33.263	166.672	—	—
32	50	Akinori Ogata	Beaver Motorsports	Chevrolet	33.838	163.839	—	—
Failed to qualify or withdrew
33	63	J. J. Yeley (i)	MB Motorsports	Chevrolet	31.709	174.840	—	—
34	6	Norm Benning	Norm Benning Racing	Chevrolet	32.430	170.953	—	—
35	10	Jennifer Jo Cobb	Jennifer Jo Cobb Racing	Chevrolet	33.119	167.396	—	—
WD	22	Austin Wayne Self	AM Racing	Toyota	—	—	—	—
Official starting lineup

== Race results ==
Stage 1 Laps: 40

Pos.	#	Driver	Team	Make	Pts
1	4	Christopher Bell	Kyle Busch Motorsports	Toyota	10
2	51	Kyle Busch (i)	Kyle Busch Motorsports	Toyota	0
3	88	Matt Crafton	ThorSport Racing	Toyota	8
4	27	Ben Rhodes	ThorSport Racing	Toyota	7
5	19	Austin Cindric (R)	Brad Keselowski Racing	Ford	6
6	21	Johnny Sauter	GMS Racing	Chevrolet	5
7	8	John Hunter Nemechek	NEMCO Motorsports	Chevrolet	4
8	29	Chase Briscoe (R)	Brad Keselowski Racing	Ford	3
9	98	Grant Enfinger (R)	ThorSport Racing	Toyota	2
10	99	Austin Dillon (i)	MDM Motorsports	Chevrolet	0

Stage 2 Laps: 40

Pos.	#	Driver	Team	Make	Pts
1	4	Christopher Bell	Kyle Busch Motorsports	Toyota	10
2	51	Kyle Busch (i)	Kyle Busch Motorsports	Toyota	0
3	27	Ben Rhodes	ThorSport Racing	Toyota	8
4	17	Timothy Peters	Red Horse Racing	Toyota	7
5	88	Matt Crafton	ThorSport Racing	Toyota	6
6	21	Johnny Sauter	GMS Racing	Chevrolet	5
7	24	Alex Bowman (i)	GMS Racing	Chevrolet	0
8	23	Chase Elliott (i)	GMS Racing	Chevrolet	0
9	66	Ross Chastain (i)	Bolen Motorsports	Chevrolet	2
10	7	Brett Moffitt	Red Horse Racing	Toyota	1

Stage 3 Laps: 50

Fin	St	#	Driver	Team	Make	Laps	Led	Status	Pts
1	1	4	Christopher Bell	Kyle Busch Motorsports	Toyota	130	99	running	60
2	7	88	Matt Crafton	ThorSport Racing	Toyota	130	2	running	49
3	6	21	Johnny Sauter	GMS Racing	Chevrolet	130	0	running	44
4	15	27	Ben Rhodes	ThorSport Racing	Toyota	130	0	running	48
5	9	23	Chase Elliott (i)	GMS Racing	Chevrolet	130	0	running	0
6	5	24	Alex Bowman (i)	GMS Racing	Chevrolet	130	0	running	0
7	18	99	Austin Dillon (i)	MDM Motorsports	Chevrolet	130	0	running	0
8	14	98	Grant Enfinger (R)	ThorSport Racing	Toyota	130	4	running	31
9	8	17	Timothy Peters	Red Horse Racing	Toyota	130	0	running	35
10	24	66	Ross Chastain (i)	Bolen Motorsports	Chevrolet	130	0	running	0
11	13	7	Brett Moffitt	Red Horse Racing	Toyota	130	0	running	27
12	23	92	Regan Smith	RBR Enterprises	Ford	130	0	running	25
13	21	16	Ryan Truex	Hattori Racing Enterprises	Toyota	130	0	running	24
14	10	18	Noah Gragson (R)	Kyle Busch Motorsports	Toyota	130	0	running	23
15	12	33	Kaz Grala (R)	GMS Racing	Chevrolet	130	0	running	22
16	16	13	Cody Coughlin (R)	ThorSport Racing	Toyota	130	0	running	21
17	25	45	T. J. Bell	Niece Motorsports	Chevrolet	130	0	running	20
18	27	02	Austin Hill	Young's Motorsports	Ford	130	0	running	19
19	20	52	Stewart Friesen (R)	Halmar Friesen Racing	Chevrolet	130	0	running	18
20	30	49	Wendell Chavous (R)	Premium Motorsports	Chevrolet	130	0	running	17
21	3	19	Austin Cindric (R)	Brad Keselowski Racing	Ford	129	0	running	22
22	17	5	Korbin Forrister	Wauters Motorsports	Toyota	128	0	running	15
23	26	44	Tommy Joe Martins	Martins Motorsports	Chevrolet	128	0	running	14
24	22	87	Joe Nemechek	NEMCO Motorsports	Chevrolet	128	0	running	13
25	4	29	Chase Briscoe (R)	Brad Keselowski Racing	Ford	127	0	running	15
26	2	51	Kyle Busch (i)	Kyle Busch Motorsports	Toyota	127	25	running	0
27	31	1	Mike Harmon (i)	TJL Motorsports	Chevrolet	124	0	running	0
28	28	12	Jordan Anderson	Rick Ware Racing	Chevrolet	102	0	crash	9
29	11	8	John Hunter Nemechek	NEMCO Motorsports	Chevrolet	79	0	crash	12
30	32	50	Akinori Ogata	Beaver Motorsports	Chevrolet	51	0	oil leak	7
31	19	75	Parker Kligerman	Henderson Motorsports	Toyota	28	0	fuel pump	6
32	29	83	Todd Peck	Copp Motorsports	Chevrolet	2	0	overheating	5
Failed to qualify or withdrew
33		63	J. J. Yeley (i)	MB Motorsports	Chevrolet				
34		6	Norm Benning	Norm Benning Racing	Chevrolet				
35		10	Jennifer Jo Cobb	Jennifer Jo Cobb Racing	Chevrolet				
WD		22	Austin Wayne Self	AM Racing	Toyota				
Official race results

== Standings after the race ==
Drivers' Championship standings

Pos	Driver	Points
1	Christopher Bell	93
2	Johnny Sauter	86 (-7)
3	Ben Rhodes	86 (–7)
4	Kaz Grala	78 (–15)
5	Matt Crafton	72 (–21)
6	Timothy Peters	70 (–23)
7	Regan Smith	56 (–37)
8	Chase Briscoe	54 (–39)
Official driver's standings

- Note: Only the first 8 positions are included for the driver standings.

Previous race: 2017 NextEra Energy Resources 250	NASCAR Camping World Truck Series; 2017 season	Next race: 2017 Alpha Energy Solutions 250
