= NASCAR Camping World Truck Series at Memphis Motorsports Park =

Former NASCAR race

MemphisTravel.com 200

NASCAR Camping World Truck Series
- Venue: Memphis Motorsports Park
- First race: 1998
- Last race: 2009
- Distance: 150 miles (241.402 km)
- Laps: 200
- Previous names: Memphis 200 (1998–1999, 2001); Quaker State 200 by AutoZone (2000); O'Reilly Auto Parts 200 (2002); O'Reilly 200 (2003–2004, 2006–2008); O'Reilly 200 Presented by Valvoline (2005); MemphisTravel.com 200 Pres. by O'Reilly Auto Parts (2009)

The MemphisTravel.com 200 was a NASCAR Camping World Truck Series race that took place at Memphis Motorsports Park from 1998 to 2009.

== Past winners ==
Year	Date	Driver	Team	Manufacturer	Race Distance		Race Time	Average Speed (mph)	Ref
Year	Date	Driver	Team	Manufacturer	Laps	Miles (km)	Race Time	Average Speed (mph)	Ref
1998	Sept 13	Ron Hornaday Jr.	Dale Earnhardt, Inc.	Chevrolet	200	150 (241.401)	1:46:53	84.204	
1999	May 8	Greg Biffle	Roush Racing	Ford	200	150 (241.401)	1:59:31	75.303	
2000	May 13	Jack Sprague	Hendrick Motorsports	Chevrolet	200	150 (241.401)	1:45:11	85.565	
2001	June 23	Dennis Setzer	Morgan-Dollar Motorsports	Chevrolet	200	150 (241.401)	1:49:23	82.279	
2002	June 22	Travis Kvapil	Addington Racing	Chevrolet	200	150 (241.401)	1:41:03	89.065	
2003	June 21	Ted Musgrave	Ultra Motorsports	Dodge	200	150 (241.401)	1:44:32	86.097	
2004	June 19	Bobby Hamilton	Bobby Hamilton Racing	Dodge	200	150 (241.401)	1:55:39	77.821	
2005*	July 23	Brandon Whitt	Red Horse Racing	Toyota	202*	151.5 (243.815)	2:07:42	71.182	
2006	July 15	Jack Sprague	Wyler Racing	Toyota	202*	151.5 (243.815)	1:42:52	88.367	
2007	June 30	Travis Kvapil	Roush Fenway Racing	Ford	200	150 (241.401)	1:38:02	91.806	
2008	June 28	Ron Hornaday Jr.	Kevin Harvick Inc.	Chevrolet	204*	153 (246.229)	1:45:59	86.617	
2009	June 27	Ron Hornaday Jr.	Kevin Harvick Inc.	Chevrolet	201*	150.75 (242.608)	1:40:24	90.09	

- 2005: First race run at night with temporary lights.
- 2005–2006 & 2008–2009: Race extended due to a green–white–checker finish.

=== Multiple winners (drivers) ===
# Wins	Driver	Years won
3	Ron Hornaday Jr.	1998, 2008, 2009
2	Jack Sprague	2000, 2006
2	Travis Kvapil	2002, 2007

=== Multiple winners (teams) ===
# Wins	Team	Years won
2	Roush Fenway Racing	1999, 2007
2	Kevin Harvick Inc.	2008, 2009

=== Manufacturer wins ===
# Wins	Make	Years won
6	(United States) Chevrolet	1998, 2000, 2001, 2002, 2008, 2009
2	(United States) Ford	1999, 2007
2	(United States) Dodge	2003, 2004
2	(Japan) Toyota	2005, 2006
