= 2016 Careers for Veterans 200 =

14th race of the 2016 NASCAR Camping World Truck Series

Race details
- Race 14 of 23 of the 2016 NASCAR Camping World Truck Series
- Date: August 27, 2016
- Official name: 17th Annual Careers for Veterans 200
- Location: Michigan International Speedway, Brooklyn, Michigan
- Course: Permanent racing facility
- Course length: 2.0 miles (3.2 km)
- Distance: 100 laps, 200 mi (321 km)
- Scheduled distance: 100 laps, 200 mi (321 km)
- Average speed: 111.732 mph (179.815 km/h)

Pole position
Driver	John Wes Townley	Athenian Motorsports
- Time: 39.195

Most laps led
Driver	Timothy Peters	Red Horse Racing
- Laps: 42

Winner
No. 11	Brett Moffitt	Red Horse Racing

Television in the United States
- Network: FS1
- Announcers: Vince Welch, Phil Parsons, and Michael Waltrip

Radio in the United States
- Radio: MRN

The 2016 Careers for Veterans 200 was the 14th stock car race of the 2016 NASCAR Camping World Truck Series, and the 17th iteration of the event. The race was held on Saturday, August 27, 2016, in Brooklyn, Michigan, at Michigan International Speedway, a 2.0-mile (3.2 km) permanent tri-oval shaped racetrack. The race took the scheduled 100 laps to complete. In an exciting battle for the win, Brett Moffitt, driving for Red Horse Racing, made a three-wide pass for the lead on the final lap, and held off Timothy Peters in the final turn to earn his first career NASCAR Camping World Truck Series win, and a 1-2 finish for Red Horse Racing. To fill out the podium, Daniel Hemric, driving for Brad Keselowski Racing, would finish 3rd, respectively.

== Background ==
The layout of Michigan International Speedway, the venue where the race was held.

Michigan International Speedway (MIS) is a 2.000 mi (3.219 km) moderate-banked D-shaped speedway located off U.S. Highway 12 on more than 1,400 acres (5.7 km^{2}) approximately four-mile (6.4 km) south of the village of Brooklyn, in the scenic Irish Hills area of southeastern Michigan. The track is 70-mile (110 km) west of the center of Detroit, 40-mile (64 km) from Ann Arbor and 60 miles (97 km) south and northwest of Lansing and Toledo, Ohio respectively. The track is used primarily for NASCAR events. It is sometimes known as a sister track to Texas World Speedway, and was used as the basis of Auto Club Speedway. The track is owned by NASCAR. Michigan International Speedway is recognized as one of motorsports' premier facilities because of its wide racing surface and high banking (by open-wheel standards; the 18-degree banking is modest by stock car standards). Michigan is the fastest track in NASCAR due to its wide, sweeping corners, long straightaways, and lack of a restrictor plate requirement; typical qualifying speeds are in excess of 200 mph (320 km/h) and corner entry speeds are anywhere from 215 to 220 mph (346 to 354 km/h) after the 2012 repaving of the track.

=== Entry list ===
- (R) denotes rookie driver.
- (i) denotes driver who is ineligible for series driver points.

#	Driver	Team	Make	Sponsor
00	Cole Custer (R)	JR Motorsports	Chevrolet	Haas Automation
1	Jennifer Jo Cobb	Jennifer Jo Cobb Racing	Chevrolet	WestsideVapor.com
02	Tyler Young	Young's Motorsports	Chevrolet	Randco, Young's Building Systems
4	Christopher Bell (R)	Kyle Busch Motorsports	Toyota	JBL
05	John Wes Townley	Athenian Motorsports	Chevrolet	Jive Communications, Zaxby's
6	Ryan Ellis (i)	Norm Benning Racing	Chevrolet	Norm Benning Racing
07	Todd Peck (i)	SS-Green Light Racing	Chevrolet	BoobiTrap.com
8	John Hunter Nemechek	NEMCO Motorsports	Chevrolet	Business Machines Company
9	William Byron (R)	Kyle Busch Motorsports	Toyota	Liberty University
10	Caleb Roark	Jennifer Jo Cobb Racing	Chevrolet	Driven2Honor.org
11	Brett Moffitt	Red Horse Racing	Toyota	Red Horse Racing
13	Cameron Hayley	ThorSport Racing	Toyota	Ride TV, Cabinets by Hayley
17	Timothy Peters	Red Horse Racing	Toyota	Red Horse Racing
19	Daniel Hemric	Brad Keselowski Racing	Ford	DrawTite
21	Johnny Sauter	GMS Racing	Chevrolet	Alamo Rent a Car
22	Austin Wayne Self (R)	AM Racing	Toyota	AM Technical Solutions
23	Spencer Gallagher	GMS Racing	Chevrolet	Chapel of the Flowers
24	Grant Enfinger (R)	GMS Racing	Chevrolet	Spencer Clark Foundation
29	Tyler Reddick	Brad Keselowski Racing	Ford	Cooper Standard Careers for Veterans
33	Ben Kennedy	GMS Racing	Chevrolet	Jacob Companies
41	Ben Rhodes (R)	ThorSport Racing	Toyota	Carolina Nut Co.
44	Tommy Joe Martins	Martins Motorsports	Chevrolet	Cross Concrete Construction
49	Reed Sorenson (i)	Premium Motorsports	Chevrolet	Premium Motorsports
50	Travis Kvapil	MAKE Motorsports	Chevrolet	CorvetteParts.net
51	Cody Coughlin (R)	Kyle Busch Motorsports	Toyota	Jegs High Performance, AFCO
63	Norm Benning	Norm Benning Racing	Chevrolet	Churchill Trucking
66	Jordan Anderson	Bolen Motorsports	Chevrolet	Columbia SC, LTi Printing
71	Enrique Contreras III	Contreras Motorsports	Chevrolet	American Club
81	Ryan Truex	Hattori Racing Enterprises	Toyota	Hino Motors Manufacturing
88	Matt Crafton	ThorSport Racing	Toyota	Great Lakes Flooring, Menards
98	Rico Abreu (R)	ThorSport Racing	Toyota	Safelite, Curb Records
Official entry list

== Practice ==
=== First practice ===
The first practice session was held on Friday, August 26, at 1:30 pm EST, and last for 1 hour and 25 minutes. Cameron Hayley, driving for ThorSport Racing, would set the fastest time in the session, with a lap of 38.543, and an average speed of 186.804 mph (300.632 km/h).

Pos.	#	Driver	Team	Make	Time	Speed
1	13	Cameron Hayley	ThorSport Racing	Toyota	38.543	186.804
2	21	Johnny Sauter	GMS Racing	Chevrolet	38.545	186.795
3	88	Matt Crafton	ThorSport Racing	Toyota	38.576	186.645
Full first practice results

=== Final practice ===
The final practice session was held on Friday, August 26, at 4:00 pm EST, and would last for 55 minutes. Tyler Reddick, driving for Brad Keselowski Racing, would set the fastest time in the session, with a lap of 38.765, and an average speed of 185.735 mph (298.912 km/h).

Pos.	#	Driver	Team	Make	Time	Speed
1	29	Tyler Reddick	Brad Keselowski Racing	Ford	38.765	185.735
2	11	Brett Moffitt	Red Horse Racing	Toyota	38.798	185.577
3	21	Johnny Sauter	GMS Racing	Chevrolet	38.836	185.395
Full final practice results

== Qualifying ==
Qualifying was held on Saturday, August 27, at 9:45 am EST. Since Michigan International Speedway is at least 1.5 miles (2.4 km) in length, the qualifying system was a single car, single lap, two round system where in the first round, everyone would set a time to determine positions 13–32. Then, the fastest 12 qualifiers would move on to the second round to determine positions 1–12.

John Wes Townley, driving for his family team, Athenian Motorsports, would score the pole for the race, with a lap of 39.195, and an average speed of 183.697 mph (295.632 km/h) in the second round.

=== Full qualifying results ===
Pos.	#	Driver	Team	Make	Time (R1)	Speed (R1)	Time (R2)	Speed (R2)
1	05	John Wes Townley	Athenian Motorsports	Chevrolet	39.192	183.711	39.195	183.697
2	88	Matt Crafton	ThorSport Racing	Toyota	39.438	182.565	39.234	183.514
3	9	William Byron (R)	Kyle Busch Motorsports	Toyota	39.380	182.834	39.296	183.225
4	17	Timothy Peters	Red Horse Racing	Toyota	39.555	182.025	39.432	182.593
5	4	Christopher Bell (R)	Kyle Busch Motorsports	Toyota	39.581	181.905	39.468	182.426
6	11	Brett Moffitt	Red Horse Racing	Toyota	39.564	181.984	39.496	182.297
7	21	Johnny Sauter	GMS Racing	Chevrolet	39.574	181.938	39.526	182.159
8	29	Tyler Reddick	Brad Keselowski Racing	Ford	39.581	181.905	39.530	182.140
9	24	Grant Enfinger (R)	GMS Racing	Chevrolet	39.724	181.251	39.574	181.938
10	51	Cody Coughlin (R)	Kyle Busch Motorsports	Toyota	39.608	181.781	39.598	181.827
11	23	Spencer Gallagher	GMS Racing	Chevrolet	39.677	181.465	39.666	181.516
12	33	Ben Kennedy	GMS Racing	Chevrolet	39.780	180.995	39.759	181.091
Eliminated in Round 1
13	19	Daniel Hemric	Brad Keselowski Racing	Ford	39.794	180.932	–	–
14	13	Cameron Hayley	ThorSport Racing	Toyota	39.803	180.891	–	–
15	98	Rico Abreu (R)	ThorSport Racing	Toyota	39.821	180.809	–	–
16	8	John Hunter Nemechek	NEMCO Motorsports	Chevrolet	39.849	180.682	–	–
17	81	Ryan Truex	Hattori Racing Enterprises	Toyota	39.873	180.573	–	–
18	00	Cole Custer (R)	JR Motorsports	Chevrolet	39.888	180.505	–	–
19	41	Ben Rhodes (R)	ThorSport Racing	Toyota	39.919	180.365	–	–
20	44	Tommy Joe Martins	Martins Motorsports	Chevrolet	39.974	180.117	–	–
21	02	Tyler Young	Young's Motorsports	Chevrolet	39.975	180.113	–	–
22	49	Reed Sorenson (i)	Premium Motorsports	Chevrolet	40.273	178.780	–	–
23	66	Jordan Anderson	Bolen Motorsports	Chevrolet	40.315	178.594	–	–
24	22	Austin Wayne Self (R)	AM Racing	Toyota	40.395	178.240	–	–
25	50	Travis Kvapil	MAKE Motorsports	Chevrolet	40.637	177.178	–	–
26	1	Jennifer Jo Cobb	Jennifer Jo Cobb Racing	Chevrolet	41.042	175.430	–	–
27	07	Todd Peck (i)	SS-Green Light Racing	Chevrolet	41.561	173.239	–	–
Qualified by owner's points
28	63	Norm Benning	Norm Benning Racing	Chevrolet	43.446	165.723	–	–
29	71	Enrique Contreras III	Contreras Motorsports	Chevrolet	45.229	159.190	–	–
30	10	Caleb Roark	Jennifer Jo Cobb Racing	Chevrolet	–	–	–	–
31	6	Ryan Ellis (i)	Norm Benning Racing	Chevrolet	43.956	163.800	–	–
Official qualifying results
Official starting lineup

== Race results ==
Fin	St	#	Driver	Team	Make	Laps	Led	Status	Pts
1	6	11	Brett Moffitt	Red Horse Racing	Toyota	100	1	Running	36
2	4	17	Timothy Peters	Red Horse Racing	Toyota	100	42	Running	33
3	13	19	Daniel Hemric	Brad Keselowski Racing	Ford	100	2	Running	31
4	3	9	William Byron (R)	Kyle Busch Motorsports	Toyota	100	9	Running	30
5	14	13	Cameron Hayley	ThorSport Racing	Toyota	100	0	Running	28
6	19	41	Ben Rhodes (R)	ThorSport Racing	Toyota	100	4	Running	28
7	2	88	Matt Crafton	ThorSport Racing	Toyota	100	23	Running	27
8	9	24	Grant Enfinger (R)	GMS Racing	Chevrolet	100	0	Running	25
9	7	21	Johnny Sauter	GMS Racing	Chevrolet	100	0	Running	24
10	21	02	Tyler Young	Young's Motorsports	Chevrolet	100	0	Running	23
11	12	33	Ben Kennedy	GMS Racing	Chevrolet	100	0	Running	22
12	1	05	John Wes Townley	Athenian Motorsports	Chevrolet	100	0	Running	21
13	15	98	Rico Abreu (R)	ThorSport Racing	Toyota	100	0	Running	20
14	23	66	Jordan Anderson	Bolen Motorsports	Chevrolet	100	0	Running	19
15	20	44	Tommy Joe Martins	Martins Motorsports	Chevrolet	100	0	Running	18
16	24	22	Austin Wayne Self (R)	AM Racing	Toyota	100	0	Running	17
17	26	1	Jennifer Jo Cobb	Jennifer Jo Cobb Racing	Chevrolet	100	0	Running	16
18	25	50	Travis Kvapil	MAKE Motorsports	Chevrolet	100	0	Running	15
19	8	29	Tyler Reddick	Brad Keselowski Racing	Ford	100	0	Running	14
20	10	51	Cody Coughlin (R)	Kyle Busch Motorsports	Toyota	94	0	Accident	13
21	22	49	Reed Sorenson (i)	Premium Motorsports	Chevrolet	84	1	Vibration	0
22	18	00	Cole Custer (R)	JR Motorsports	Chevrolet	83	18	Accident	12
23	17	81	Ryan Truex	Hattori Racing Enterprises	Toyota	76	0	Rear Gear	10
24	5	4	Christopher Bell (R)	Kyle Busch Motorsports	Toyota	74	0	Accident	9
25	11	23	Spencer Gallagher	GMS Racing	Chevrolet	74	0	Accident	8
26	16	8	John Hunter Nemechek	NEMCO Motorsports	Chevrolet	62	0	Accident	7
27	28	63	Norm Benning	Norm Benning Racing	Chevrolet	47	0	Transmission	6
28	29	71	Enrique Contreras III	Contreras Motorsports	Chevrolet	40	0	Accident	5
29	27	07	Todd Peck (i)	SS-Green Light Racing	Chevrolet	37	0	Engine	0
30	30	10	Caleb Roark	Jennifer Jo Cobb Racing	Chevrolet	3	0	Electrical	3
31	31	6	Ryan Ellis (i)	Norm Benning Racing	Chevrolet	1	0	Rear Gear	0
Official race results

== Standings after the race ==
Drivers' Championship standings

	Pos	Driver	Points
	1	William Byron	379
	2	Daniel Hemric	343 (−36)
1	3	Timothy Peters	335 (−44)
1	4	Johnny Sauter	330 (−49)
1	5	Matt Crafton	322 (−57)
1	6	Ben Kennedy	309 (−70)
2	7	Christopher Bell	305 (−74)
	8	John Hunter Nemechek	288 (−91)
Official driver's standings

- Note: Only the first 8 positions are included for the driver standings.

Previous race: 2016 UNOH 200	NASCAR Camping World Truck Series; 2016 season	Next race: 2016 Chevrolet Silverado 250
