= 2007 Auto Club 500 =

Second race of the 2007 NASCAR Nextel Cup Series

Race details
- Race 2 of 36 in the 2007 NASCAR Nextel Cup Series
- The 2007 Auto Club 500 program cover.
- Date: February 25, 2007
- Official name: 11th Annual Auto Club 500
- Location: Fontana, California, California Speedway
- Course: Permanent racing facility
- Course length: 2.0 miles (3.218 km)
- Distance: 250 laps, 500 mi (804.672 km)
- Average speed: 138.451 miles per hour (222.815 km/h)
- Attendance: 87,000

Pole position
Driver	Jeff Gordon	Hendrick Motorsports
- Time: 38.765

Most laps led
Driver	Matt Kenseth	Roush Fenway Racing
- Laps: 133

Winner
No. 17	Matt Kenseth	Roush Fenway Racing

Television in the United States
- Network: FOX
- Announcers: Mike Joy, Larry McReynolds, Darrell Waltrip

Radio in the United States
- Radio: Motor Racing Network

The 2007 Auto Club 500 was the second stock car race of the 2007 NASCAR Nextel Cup Series and the 11th iteration of the event. The race was held on Sunday, February 25, 2007, before an audience of 87,000 in Fontana, California, at California Speedway, a two-mile (3.2 km) moderate-banked D-shaped speedway. The race took the scheduled 250 laps to complete. At race's end, Roush Fenway Racing driver Matt Kenseth would manage to dominate a majority of the race to take his 15th career NASCAR Winston Cup Series victory and his first victory of the season. To fill out the top three, Jeff Gordon and Jimmie Johnson, both drivers for Hendrick Motorsports, would finish second and third, respectively.

== Background ==
The layout of Auto Club Speedway, the venue where the race was held.

Auto Club Speedway (previously California Speedway) was a two-mile (3.2 km), low-banked, D-shaped oval superspeedway in Fontana, California which hosted NASCAR racing annually from 1997 to 2023. It was also used for open wheel racing events. The racetrack was located near the former locations of Ontario Motor Speedway and Riverside International Raceway. The track was owned and operated by International Speedway Corporation and was the only track owned by ISC to have its naming rights sold. The speedway was served by the nearby Interstate 10 and Interstate 15 freeways as well as a Metrolink station located behind the backstretch.

=== Entry list ===
- (R) denotes rookie driver.

#	Driver	Team	Make	Sponsor
00	David Reutimann (R)	Michael Waltrip Racing	Toyota	Domino's
1	Martin Truex Jr.	Dale Earnhardt, Inc.	Chevrolet	Bass Pro Shops, Tracker Boats
01	Mark Martin	Ginn Racing	Chevrolet	U.S. Army
2	Kurt Busch	Penske Racing South	Dodge	Miller Lite
4	Ward Burton	Morgan–McClure Motorsports	Chevrolet	State Water Heaters
5	Kyle Busch	Hendrick Motorsports	Chevrolet	Kellogg's, Carquest
6	David Ragan (R)	Roush Fenway Racing	Ford	AAA
7	Robby Gordon	Robby Gordon Motorsports	Ford	Jim Bean
07	Clint Bowyer	Richard Childress Racing	Chevrolet	Jack Daniel's
8	Dale Earnhardt Jr.	Dale Earnhardt, Inc.	Chevrolet	Budweiser
9	Kasey Kahne	Evernham Motorsports	Dodge	Dodge
10	Scott Riggs	Evernham Motorsports	Dodge	Stanley Tools
11	Denny Hamlin	Joe Gibbs Racing	Chevrolet	FedEx Freight
12	Ryan Newman	Penske Racing South	Dodge	Mobil 1
13	Joe Nemechek	Ginn Racing	Chevrolet	CertainTeed
14	Sterling Marlin	Ginn Racing	Chevrolet	Panasonic
15	Paul Menard (R)	Dale Earnhardt, Inc.	Chevrolet	Menards, Quaker State
16	Greg Biffle	Roush Fenway Racing	Ford	Ameriquest Mortgage
17	Matt Kenseth	Roush Fenway Racing	Ford	Carhartt
18	J. J. Yeley	Joe Gibbs Racing	Chevrolet	Interstate Batteries
19	Elliott Sadler	Evernham Motorsports	Dodge	Dodge
20	Tony Stewart	Joe Gibbs Racing	Chevrolet	The Home Depot
21	Ken Schrader	Wood Brothers Racing	Ford	Little Debbie
22	Dave Blaney	Bill Davis Racing	Toyota	Caterpillar
24	Jeff Gordon	Hendrick Motorsports	Chevrolet	DuPont Cromax Pro
25	Casey Mears	Hendrick Motorsports	Chevrolet	National Guard, GMAC
26	Jamie McMurray	Roush Fenway Racing	Ford	Crown Royal
29	Kevin Harvick	Richard Childress Racing	Chevrolet	Shell, Pennzoil
31	Jeff Burton	Richard Childress Racing	Chevrolet	Cingular Wireless
34	Kevin Lepage	Front Row Motorsports	Dodge	Front Row Motorsports
36	Jeremy Mayfield	Bill Davis Racing	Toyota	360 OTC
37	John Andretti	Front Row Motorsports	Dodge	Camping World
38	David Gilliland	Robert Yates Racing	Ford	M&M's
40	David Stremme	Chip Ganassi Racing	Dodge	Coors Light
41	Reed Sorenson	Chip Ganassi Racing	Dodge	Energizer
42	Juan Pablo Montoya (R)	Chip Ganassi Racing	Dodge	Texaco, Havoline
43	Bobby Labonte	Petty Enterprises	Dodge	Cheerios
44	Dale Jarrett	Michael Waltrip Racing	Toyota	UPS
45	Kyle Petty	Petty Enterprises	Dodge	Wells Fargo
48	Jimmie Johnson	Hendrick Motorsports	Chevrolet	Lowe's
49	Mike Bliss	BAM Racing	Dodge	Zone Loans
55	Michael Waltrip	Michael Waltrip Racing	Toyota	NAPA Auto Parts
66	Jeff Green	Haas CNC Racing	Chevrolet	Yellow Transportation
70	Johnny Sauter	Haas CNC Racing	Chevrolet	Best Buy
72	Brandon Whitt	CJM Racing	Chevrolet	Dutch Quality Stone
78	Kenny Wallace	Furniture Row Racing	Chevrolet	Furniture Row
83	Brian Vickers	Red Bull Racing Team	Toyota	Red Bull
84	A. J. Allmendinger (R)	Red Bull Racing Team	Toyota	Red Bull
88	Ricky Rudd	Robert Yates Racing	Ford	Snickers
96	Tony Raines	Hall of Fame Racing	Chevrolet	DLP HDTV, Texas Instruments
99	Carl Edwards	Roush Fenway Racing	Ford	Office Depot

== Practice ==
=== First practice ===
The first practice session was held on Friday, February 23, at 2:30 PM EST. The session would last for one hour and 30 minutes. Joe Nemechek, driving for Ginn Racing, would set the fastest time in the session, with a lap of 38.873 and an average speed of 185.219 miles per hour (298.081 km/h).

Pos.	#	Driver	Team	Make	Time	Speed
1	13	Joe Nemechek	Ginn Racing	Chevrolet	38.873	185.219
2	07	Clint Bowyer	Richard Childress Racing	Chevrolet	38.965	184.781
3	24	Jeff Gordon	Hendrick Motorsports	Chevrolet	38.980	184.710
Full first practice results

=== Second practice ===
The second practice session was held on Saturday, February 24, at 2:00 PM EST. The session would last for 50 minutes. Clint Bowyer, driving for Richard Childress Racing, would set the fastest time in the session, with a lap of 39.686 and an average speed of 181.424 miles per hour (291.974 km/h).

Pos.	#	Driver	Team	Make	Time	Speed
1	07	Clint Bowyer	Richard Childress Racing	Chevrolet	39.686	181.424
2	48	Jimmie Johnson	Hendrick Motorsports	Chevrolet	39.691	181.401
3	8	Dale Earnhardt Jr.	Dale Earnhardt, Inc.	Chevrolet	39.727	181.237
Full second practice results

=== Final practice ===
The final practice session, sometimes referred to as Happy Hour, was held on Saturday, February 24, at 5:20 PM EST. The session would last for 50 minutes. Kevin Harvick, driving for Richard Childress Racing, would set the fastest time in the session, with a lap of 40.380 and an average speed of 178.306 miles per hour (286.956 km/h).

Pos.	#	Driver	Team	Make	Time	Speed
1	29	Kevin Harvick	Richard Childress Racing	Chevrolet	40.380	178.306
2	48	Jimmie Johnson	Hendrick Motorsports	Chevrolet	40.398	178.227
3	83	Brian Vickers	Red Bull Racing Team	Toyota	40.441	178.037
Full Happy Hour practice results

== Qualifying ==
Qualifying was held on Friday, February 23, at 1:30 PM EST. Each driver would have two laps to set a fastest time; the fastest of the two would count as their official qualifying lap. While positions 1-42 would be determined by qualifying speed, the top 35 teams in owner's points would be assured that they would earn a spot in the field if they had managed to make an effort to qualify. The remaining seven positions from positions 36-42 would be assigned to those drivers with the fastest qualifying speeds whose car owners are not among the top 35. The final starting position, position 43, can be utilized by a car owner whose driver is a current or past NASCAR Nextel Cup champion who participated as a driver during the current of previous season and was entered in the event for that owner in that car prior to the entry deadline. In the case that iff there was more than one series champion vying for the position, it would be given to the most recent series champion. If the final provisional starting position is not filled by a current or past series champion, it will be assigned to the next eligible car owner according to qualifying results.

Jeff Gordon, driving for Hendrick Motorsports, would win the pole, setting a time of 38.765 and an average speed of 185.735 miles per hour (298.912 km/h).

Eight drivers would fail to qualify.

=== Full qualifying results ===
Pos.	#	Driver	Team	Make	Time	Speed
1	24	Jeff Gordon	Hendrick Motorsports	Chevrolet	38.765	185.735
2	9	Kasey Kahne	Evernham Motorsports	Dodge	38.810	185.519
3	01	Mark Martin	Ginn Racing	Chevrolet	38.814	185.500
4	29	Kevin Harvick	Richard Childress Racing	Chevrolet	38.830	185.424
5	8	Dale Earnhardt Jr.	Dale Earnhardt, Inc.	Chevrolet	38.834	185.404
6	07	Clint Bowyer	Richard Childress Racing	Chevrolet	38.960	184.805
7	1	Martin Truex Jr.	Dale Earnhardt, Inc.	Chevrolet	39.009	184.573
8	31	Jeff Burton	Richard Childress Racing	Chevrolet	39.058	184.341
9	42	Juan Pablo Montoya (R)	Chip Ganassi Racing	Dodge	39.084	184.219
10	25	Casey Mears	Hendrick Motorsports	Chevrolet	39.098	184.153
11	20	Tony Stewart	Joe Gibbs Racing	Chevrolet	39.099	184.148
12	5	Kyle Busch	Hendrick Motorsports	Chevrolet	39.101	184.139
13	16	Greg Biffle	Roush Fenway Racing	Ford	39.145	183.932
14	22	Dave Blaney	Bill Davis Racing	Toyota	39.146	183.927
15	83	Brian Vickers	Red Bull Racing Team	Toyota	39.162	183.852
16	66	Jeff Green	Haas CNC Racing	Chevrolet	39.184	183.749
17	11	Denny Hamlin	Joe Gibbs Racing	Chevrolet	39.205	183.650
18	2	Kurt Busch	Penske Racing South	Dodge	39.210	183.627
19	12	Ryan Newman	Penske Racing South	Dodge	39.230	183.533
20	41	Reed Sorenson	Chip Ganassi Racing	Dodge	39.244	183.467
21	99	Carl Edwards	Roush Fenway Racing	Ford	39.266	183.365
22	15	Paul Menard (R)	Dale Earnhardt, Inc.	Chevrolet	39.275	183.323
23	48	Jimmie Johnson	Hendrick Motorsports	Chevrolet	39.280	183.299
24	40	David Stremme	Chip Ganassi Racing	Dodge	39.315	183.136
25	17	Matt Kenseth	Roush Fenway Racing	Ford	39.359	182.932
26	13	Joe Nemechek	Ginn Racing	Chevrolet	39.372	182.871
27	14	Sterling Marlin	Ginn Racing	Chevrolet	39.375	182.857
28	43	Bobby Labonte	Petty Enterprises	Dodge	39.404	182.723
29	18	J. J. Yeley	Joe Gibbs Racing	Chevrolet	39.422	182.639
30	10	Scott Riggs	Evernham Motorsports	Dodge	39.428	182.611
31	70	Johnny Sauter	Haas CNC Racing	Chevrolet	39.432	182.593
32	37	John Andretti	Front Row Motorsports	Dodge	39.452	182.500
33	00	David Reutimann (R)	Michael Waltrip Racing	Toyota	39.467	182.431
34	88	Ricky Rudd	Robert Yates Racing	Ford	39.541	182.089
35	26	Jamie McMurray	Roush Fenway Racing	Ford	39.572	181.947
36	21	Ken Schrader	Wood Brothers Racing	Ford	39.629	181.685
37	45	Kyle Petty	Petty Enterprises	Dodge	39.630	181.680
38	19	Elliott Sadler	Evernham Motorsports	Dodge	39.647	181.603
39	6	David Ragan (R)	Roush Fenway Racing	Ford	39.664	181.525
Qualified by owner's points
40	38	David Gilliland	Robert Yates Racing	Ford	39.687	181.420
41	96	Tony Raines	Hall of Fame Racing	Chevrolet	39.697	181.374
42	7	Robby Gordon	Robby Gordon Motorsports	Ford	39.953	180.212
Champion's Provisional
43	44	Dale Jarrett	Michael Waltrip Racing	Toyota	-	-
Failed to qualify
44	55	Michael Waltrip	Michael Waltrip Racing	Toyota	39.500	182.279
45	4	Ward Burton	Morgan–McClure Motorsports	Chevrolet	39.555	182.025
46	36	Jeremy Mayfield	Bill Davis Racing	Toyota	39.555	182.025
47	84	A. J. Allmendinger (R)	Red Bull Racing Team	Toyota	39.561	181.997
48	72	Brandon Whitt	CJM Racing	Chevrolet	39.801	180.900
49	49	Mike Bliss	BAM Racing	Dodge	39.849	180.682
50	78	Kenny Wallace	Furniture Row Racing	Chevrolet	40.200	179.105
51	34	Kevin Lepage	Front Row Motorsports	Dodge	-	-
Official qualifying results

== Race results ==
Fin	St	#	Driver	Team	Make	Laps	Led	Status	Pts	Winnings
1	25	17	Matt Kenseth	Roush Fenway Racing	Ford	250	133	running	195	$342,316
2	1	24	Jeff Gordon	Hendrick Motorsports	Chevrolet	250	2	running	175	$249,011
3	23	48	Jimmie Johnson	Hendrick Motorsports	Chevrolet	250	31	running	170	$212,811
4	8	31	Jeff Burton	Richard Childress Racing	Chevrolet	250	18	running	165	$173,441
5	3	01	Mark Martin	Ginn Racing	Chevrolet	250	1	running	160	$171,708
6	6	07	Clint Bowyer	Richard Childress Racing	Chevrolet	250	2	running	155	$119,875
7	18	2	Kurt Busch	Penske Racing South	Dodge	250	0	running	146	$140,583
8	11	20	Tony Stewart	Joe Gibbs Racing	Chevrolet	250	28	running	147	$148,161
9	12	5	Kyle Busch	Hendrick Motorsports	Chevrolet	250	9	running	143	$109,525
10	15	83	Brian Vickers	Red Bull Racing Team	Toyota	250	0	running	134	$94,400
11	17	11	Denny Hamlin	Joe Gibbs Racing	Chevrolet	250	0	running	130	$116,800
12	19	12	Ryan Newman	Penske Racing South	Dodge	250	0	running	127	$128,275
13	29	18	J. J. Yeley	Joe Gibbs Racing	Chevrolet	250	0	running	124	$124,958
14	26	13	Joe Nemechek	Ginn Racing	Chevrolet	250	0	running	121	$90,450
15	13	16	Greg Biffle	Roush Fenway Racing	Ford	250	2	running	123	$108,400
16	39	6	David Ragan (R)	Roush Fenway Racing	Ford	250	0	running	115	$130,075
17	4	29	Kevin Harvick	Richard Childress Racing	Chevrolet	250	3	running	117	$136,786
18	31	70	Johnny Sauter	Haas CNC Racing	Chevrolet	249	0	running	109	$87,450
19	24	40	David Stremme	Chip Ganassi Racing	Dodge	249	0	running	106	$90,850
20	22	15	Paul Menard (R)	Dale Earnhardt, Inc.	Chevrolet	249	0	running	103	$87,850
21	42	7	Robby Gordon	Robby Gordon Motorsports	Ford	249	0	running	100	$90,700
22	37	45	Kyle Petty	Petty Enterprises	Dodge	249	1	running	102	$104,908
23	41	96	Tony Raines	Hall of Fame Racing	Chevrolet	249	0	running	94	$99,500
24	38	19	Elliott Sadler	Evernham Motorsports	Dodge	248	0	running	91	$105,670
25	40	38	David Gilliland	Robert Yates Racing	Ford	248	0	running	88	$114,314
26	9	42	Juan Pablo Montoya (R)	Chip Ganassi Racing	Dodge	248	0	running	85	$120,475
27	34	88	Ricky Rudd	Robert Yates Racing	Ford	248	0	running	82	$116,233
28	28	43	Bobby Labonte	Petty Enterprises	Dodge	248	0	running	79	$121,436
29	21	99	Carl Edwards	Roush Fenway Racing	Ford	247	0	running	76	$92,200
30	16	66	Jeff Green	Haas CNC Racing	Chevrolet	247	0	running	73	$106,608
31	10	25	Casey Mears	Hendrick Motorsports	Chevrolet	246	0	running	70	$91,275
32	43	44	Dale Jarrett	Michael Waltrip Racing	Toyota	246	0	running	67	$80,575
33	33	00	David Reutimann (R)	Michael Waltrip Racing	Toyota	239	0	accident	64	$92,958
34	32	37	John Andretti	Front Row Motorsports	Dodge	220	0	electrical	61	$80,150
35	27	14	Sterling Marlin	Ginn Racing	Chevrolet	198	0	electrical	58	$89,472
36	36	21	Ken Schrader	Wood Brothers Racing	Ford	160	0	engine	55	$98,989
37	35	26	Jamie McMurray	Roush Fenway Racing	Ford	134	0	running	52	$87,550
38	2	9	Kasey Kahne	Evernham Motorsports	Dodge	129	20	engine	54	$137,991
39	14	22	Dave Blaney	Bill Davis Racing	Toyota	112	0	engine	46	$87,180
40	5	8	Dale Earnhardt Jr.	Dale Earnhardt, Inc.	Chevrolet	74	0	engine	43	$124,433
41	30	10	Scott Riggs	Evernham Motorsports	Dodge	16	0	accident	40	$86,900
42	7	1	Martin Truex Jr.	Dale Earnhardt, Inc.	Chevrolet	14	0	engine	37	$105,155
43	20	41	Reed Sorenson	Chip Ganassi Racing	Dodge	7	0	accident	34	$86,963
Failed to qualify
44		55	Michael Waltrip	Michael Waltrip Racing	Toyota					
45		4	Ward Burton	Morgan–McClure Motorsports	Chevrolet					
46		36	Jeremy Mayfield	Bill Davis Racing	Toyota					
47		84	A. J. Allmendinger (R)	Red Bull Racing Team	Toyota					
48		72	Brandon Whitt	CJM Racing	Chevrolet					
49		49	Mike Bliss	BAM Racing	Dodge					
50		78	Kenny Wallace	Furniture Row Racing	Chevrolet					
51		34	Kevin Lepage	Front Row Motorsports	Dodge					
Official race results

== Standings after the race ==
Drivers' Championship standings

	Pos	Driver	Points
1	1	Mark Martin	335
1	2	Jeff Burton	330 (-5)
5	3	Jeff Gordon	309 (-26)
3	4	Kevin Harvick	307 (–28)
	5	David Ragan	270 (–65)
10	6	Clint Bowyer	264 (–71)
	7	Joe Nemechek	259 (–76)
2	8	J. J. Yeley	251 (–84)
13	9	Kyle Busch	239 (–96)
1	10	David Stremme	236 (–99)
5	11	David Gilliland	235 (–100)
28	12	Matt Kenseth	232 (–103)
Official driver's standings

- Note: Only the first 12 positions are included for the driver standings.

Previous race: 2007 Daytona 500	NASCAR Nextel Cup Series; 2007 season	Next race: 2007 UAW-DaimlerChrysler 400
