= 2006 Checker Auto Parts 500 =

Auto race run in Arizona in 2006

2006 Checker Auto Parts 500 Presented by Pennzoil
Race details
- Race 35 of 36 in the 2006 NASCAR Nextel Cup Series season
- 2006 Checker Auto Parts 500 program cover
- Date: November 12, 2006
- Official name: Checker Auto Parts 500
- Location: Phoenix International Raceway, Avondale, Arizona
- Course: Permanent racing facility
- Course length: 1.000 miles (1.609 km)
- Distance: 312 laps, 312 mi (502 km)
- Weather: Warm with temperatures approaching 80.1 °F (26.7 °C); wind speeds up to 8 miles per hour (13 km/h)
- Average speed: 96.131 miles per hour (154.708 km/h)
- Attendance: 106,000

Pole position
Driver	Jeff Gordon	Hendrick Motorsports
- Time: 26.773

Most laps led
Driver	Kevin Harvick	Richard Childress Racing
- Laps: 252

Winner
No. 29	Kevin Harvick	Richard Childress Racing

Television in the United States
- Network: NBC
- Announcers: Bill Weber; Benny Parsons; Wally Dallenbach

The 2006 Checker Auto Parts 500 Presented by Pennzoil was a NASCAR Nextel Cup Series racing event that took place on November 12, 2006, at Phoenix International Raceway in Avondale, Arizona.

The traditional pre-race ceremonies were held with the showing of the national colors along with the invocation service from a local minister. One of country music's top ten recording artists of 2006, Taylor Swift, sang the national anthem prior to the racing event. The green flag was officially waved at 2:35 p.m. and the checked flag was waved at approximately 5:49 p.m. After this race, Colombian native Juan Pablo Montoya and Australian driver Marcos Ambrose would temporarily become the foreigners that would consistently make the racing grid for all the future NASCAR Cup Series races along with limited degrees of success by Scottish IndyCar driver Dario Franchitti.

Events held alongside the 2006 Checker Auto Parts 500 on the same weekend include the Casino Arizona 150 (NASCAR Craftsman Truck Series) and the Arizona Travel 200 (NASCAR Busch Series).

== Entry list ==
No.	Driver	Team	Make
1	Martin Truex Jr.	Dale Earnhardt, Inc.	Chevrolet
01	Joe Nemechek	Ginn Racing	Chevrolet
2	Kurt Busch	Penske Racing South	Dodge
02	Brandon Ash	Ash Motorsports	Dodge
4	Ward Burton	Morgan–McClure Motorsports	Chevrolet
5	Kyle Busch	Hendrick Motorsports	Chevrolet
6	Mark Martin	Roush Racing	Ford
06	Todd Kluever	Roush Racing	Ford
7	Robby Gordon	Robby Gordon Motorsports	Ford
07	Clint Bowyer	Richard Childress Racing	Chevrolet
8	Dale Earnhardt Jr.	Dale Earnhardt, Inc.	Chevrolet
9	Kasey Kahne	Evernham Motorsports	Dodge
09	Jeremy Mayfield	Phoenix Racing	Dodge
10	Scott Riggs	Evernham Motorsports	Dodge
11	Denny Hamlin	Joe Gibbs Racing	Toyota
12	Ryan Newman	Penske Racing South	Ford
14	Sterling Marlin	MB2 Motorsports	Chevrolet
16	Greg Biffle	Roush Racing	Ford
17	Matt Kenseth	Roush Racing	Ford
18	J.J. Yeley	Joe Gibbs Racing	Chevrolet
19	Elliott Sadler	Evernham Motorsports	Dodge
20	Tony Stewart	Joe Gibbs Racing	Toyota
21	Ken Schrader	Wood Brothers Racing	Ford
22	Dave Blaney	Bill Davis Racing	Toyota
24	Jeff Gordon	Hendrick Motorsports	Chevrolet
25	Brian Vickers	Hendrick Motorsports	Chevrolet
26	Jamie McMurray	Roush Racing	Ford
29	Kevin Harvick	Richard Childress Racing	Chevrolet
31	Jeff Burton	Richard Childress Racing	Toyota
32	Travis Kvapil	PPI Motorsports	Chevrolet
34	Kevin Lepage	Front Row Motorsports	Dodge
37	Bill Elliott	R&J Racing	Dodge
38	David Gilliland	Robert Yates Racing	Ford
40	David Stremme	Chip Ganassi Racing with Felix Sabates	Dodge
41	Reed Sorenson	Chip Ganassi Racing with Felix Sabates	Dodge
42	Casey Mears	Chip Ganassi Racing with Felix Sabates	Dodge
43	Bobby Labonte	Petty Enterprises	Dodge
45	Kyle Petty	Petty Enterprises	Ford
48	Jimmie Johnson	Hendrick Motorsports	Chevrolet
49	Mike Bliss	BAM Racing	Dodge
55	Michael Waltrip	Waltrip-Jasper Racing	Dodge
61	Stanton Barrett	Front Row Motorsports	Dodge
66	Jeff Green	Haas CNC Racing	Chevrolet
71	Jason Leffler	Braun Racing	Chevrolet
72	Brandon Whitt	CJM Racing	Chevrolet
74	Derrike Cope	McGlynn Racing	Dodge
78	Kenny Wallace	Furniture Row Racing	Chevrolet
88	Dale Jarrett	Robert Yates Racing	Ford
89	Morgan Shepherd	Shepherd Racing Ventures	Ford
96	Tony Raines	Hall of Fame Racing	Chevrolet
99	Carl Edwards	Roush Racing	Ford

== Qualifying ==
Pos	No.	Driver	Make	Team	Time	Avg. Speed (mph)	Behind
1	24	Jeff Gordon	Chevrolet	Hendrick Motorsports	26.773	134.464	0.000
2	29	Kevin Harvick	Chevrolet	Richard Childress Racing	26.871	133.973	00.098
3	25	Brian Vickers	Chevrolet	Hendrick Motorsports	26.876	133.949	00.103
4	8	Dale Earnhardt Jr.	Chevrolet	Dale Earnhardt, Inc.	26.932	133.670	00.159
5	01	Joe Nemechek	Chevrolet	Ginn Racing	26.942	133.620	00.169
6	16	Greg Biffle	Ford	Roush Racing	26.959	133.536	00.186
7	12	Ryan Newman	Dodge	Penske Racing South	26.963	133.516	00.190
8	2	Kurt Busch	Dodge	Penske Racing South	26.972	133.472	00.199
9	5	Kyle Busch	Chevrolet	Hendrick Motorsports	26.975	133.457	00.202
10	17	Matt Kenseth	Ford	Roush Racing	26.983	133.417	00.210
11	9	Kasey Kahne	Dodge	Evernham Motorsports	26.991	133.378	00.218
12	99	Carl Edwards	Ford	Roush Racing	27.039	133.141	00.266
13	38	David Gilliland	Ford	Robert Yates Racing	27.057	133.052	00.284
14	26	Jamie McMurray	Ford	Roush Racing	27.071	132.984	00.298
15	43	Bobby Labonte	Dodge	Petty Enterprises	27.079	132.944	00.306
16	19	Elliott Sadler	Dodge	Evernham Motorsports	27.081	132.934	00.308
17	42	Casey Mears	Dodge	Chip Ganassi Racing with Felix Sabates	27.097	132.856	00.324
18	31	Jeff Burton	Chevrolet	Richard Childress Racing	27.100	132.841	00.327
19	55	Michael Waltrip	Dodge	Waltrip-Jasper Racing	27.101	132.836	00.328
20	07	Clint Bowyer	Chevrolet	Richard Childress Racing	27.116	132.763	00.343
21	6	Mark Martin	Ford	Roush Racing	27.117	132.758	00.344
22	11	Denny Hamlin	Chevrolet	Joe Gibbs Racing	27.127	132.709	00.354
23	20	Tony Stewart	Chevrolet	Joe Gibbs Racing	27.132	132.685	00.359
24	4	Ward Burton	Chevrolet	Morgan–McClure Motorsports	27.186	132.421	00.413
25	66	Jeff Green	Chevrolet	Haas CNC Racing	27.222	132.246	00.449
26	1	Martin Truex Jr.	Chevrolet	Dale Earnhardt, Inc.	27.228	132.217	00.455
27	88	Dale Jarrett	Ford	Robert Yates Racing	27.253	132.096	00.480
28	41	Reed Sorenson	Dodge	Chip Ganassi Racing with Felix Sabates	27.284	131.945	00.511
29	48	Jimmie Johnson	Chevrolet	Hendrick Motorsports	27.299	131.873	00.526
30	14	Sterling Marlin	Chevrolet	MB2 Motorsports	27.315	131.796	00.542
31	22	Dave Blaney	Dodge	Bill Davis Racing	27.354	131.608	00.581
32	21	Ken Schrader	Ford	Wood Brothers Racing	27.354	131.608	00.581
33	32	Travis Kvapil	Chevrolet	PPI Motorsports	27.382	131.473	00.609
34	45	Kyle Petty	Dodge	Petty Enterprises	27.398	131.396	00.625
35	18	J.J. Yeley	Chevrolet	Joe Gibbs Racing	27.439	131.200	00.666
36	40	David Stremme	Dodge	Chip Ganassi Racing with Felix Sabates	27.464	131.081	00.691
37	72	Brandon Whitt	Chevrolet	CJM Racing	27.484	130.985	00.711
38	49	Mike Bliss	Dodge	BAM Racing	27.488	130.966	00.715
39	61	Chad Chaffin	Dodge	Front Row Motorsports	27.532	130.757	00.759
40	7	Robby Gordon*	Chevrolet	Robby Gordon Motorsports	27.608	130.397	00.835
41	96	Tony Raines*	Chevrolet	Hall of Fame Racing	27.623	130.326	00.850
42	10	Scott Riggs*	Dodge	Evernham Motorsports	27.724	129.851	00.951
43	37	Bill Elliott**	Dodge	R&J Racing	28.106	128.087	
Failed to qualify
44	71	Jason Leffler	Chevrolet	Braun Racing	27.588	130.492	
45	06	Todd Kluever	Ford	Roush Racing	27.613	130.373	
46	89	Morgan Shepherd	Dodge	Shepherd Racing Ventures	27.663	130.138	
47	02	Brandon Ash	Dodge	Ash Motorsports	27.699	129.969	
48	34	Kevin Lepage	Chevrolet	Front Row Motorsports	27.780	129.590	
49	78	Kenny Wallace	Chevrolet	Furniture Row Racing	27.930	128.894	
50	74	Derrike Cope	Dodge	McGlynn Racing	27.935	128.871	
51	09	Jeremy Mayfield	Dodge	Phoenix Racing	28.046	128.361	

*Qualified by owner's points.

**Qualified by champion's provisional.

== Results ==
Fin	St	No.	Driver	Make	Team	Sponsor	Laps	Led	Status	Pts	Winnings
1	2	29	Kevin Harvick	Chevrolet	Richard Childress Racing	Reese's Cookies	312	252	running	190	216825
2	29	48	Jimmie Johnson	Chevrolet	Hendrick Motorsports	Lowe's	312	28	running	175	183275
3	22	11	Denny Hamlin	Chevrolet	Joe Gibbs Racing	FedEx Ground	312	0	running	165	139800
4	1	24	Jeff Gordon	Chevrolet	Hendrick Motorsports	DuPont	312	3	running	165	136125
5	12	99	Carl Edwards	Ford	Roush Racing	Office Depot	312	0	running	155	120425
6	21	6	Mark Martin	Ford	Roush Racing	AAA Insurance	312	26	running	155	104725
7	11	9	Kasey Kahne	Dodge	Evernham Motorsports	Dodge Dealers, UAW	312	0	running	146	99025
8	8	2	Kurt Busch	Dodge	Penske Racing South	Miller Lite	312	0	running	142	93050
9	4	8	Dale Earnhardt Jr.	Chevrolet	Dale Earnhardt, Inc.	Budweiser	312	0	running	138	88050
10	18	31	Jeff Burton	Chevrolet	Richard Childress Racing	Cingular Wireless	312	0	running	134	90500
11	3	25	Brian Vickers	Chevrolet	Hendrick Motorsports	GMAC	312	0	running	130	83350
12	26	1	Martin Truex Jr.	Chevrolet	Dale Earnhardt, Inc.	Bass Pro Shops, Tracker Boats	312	0	running	127	100608
13	10	17	Matt Kenseth	Ford	Roush Racing	USG Sheetrock	312	1	running	129	86700
14	23	20	Tony Stewart	Chevrolet	Joe Gibbs Racing	Home Depot	312	0	running	121	91550
15	7	12	Ryan Newman	Dodge	Penske Racing South	Alltel	312	0	running	118	83125
16	13	38	David Gilliland	Ford	Robert Yates Racing	M&M's	312	1	running	120	77950
17	16	19	Elliott Sadler	Dodge	Evernham Motorsports	Dodge Dealers, UAW	312	0	running	112	76500
18	36	40	David Stremme	Dodge	Chip Ganassi Racing with Felix Sabates	Discount Tire	312	0	running	109	92233
19	5	01	Joe Nemechek	Chevrolet	Ginn Racing	Principal Financial Group	312	0	running	106	75775
20	35	18	J.J. Yeley	Chevrolet	Joe Gibbs Racing	GSK, Boniva	312	0	running	103	78350
21	41	96	Tony Raines	Chevrolet	Hall of Fame Racing	DLP HDTV	312	0	running	100	67325
22	42	10	Scott Riggs	Dodge	Evernham Motorsports	Stanley Tools, Valvoline	312	0	running	97	67100
23	31	22	Dave Blaney	Dodge	Bill Davis Racing	Caterpillar	312	0	running	94	81983
24	32	21	Ken Schrader	Ford	Wood Brothers Racing	Little Debbie	312	0	running	91	74625
25	34	45	Kyle Petty	Dodge	Petty Enterprises	Wells Fargo	312	0	running	88	86458
26	17	42	Casey Mears	Dodge	Chip Ganassi Racing with Felix Sabates	Texaco, Havoline	312	0	running	85	74175
27	15	43	Bobby Labonte	Dodge	Petty Enterprises	Cheerios Spoonfuls of Stories	311	0	running	82	74050
28	24	4	Ward Burton	Chevrolet	Morgan–McClure Motorsports	Lucas Oil	311	0	running	79	65425
29	28	41	Reed Sorenson	Dodge	Chip Ganassi Racing with Felix Sabates	Target	310	0	running	76	70800
30	33	32	Travis Kvapil	Chevrolet	PPI Motorsports	Tide, Downy	310	0	running	73	72722
31	43	37	Bill Elliott	Dodge	R&J Racing	Melling	309	0	running	70	62550
32	40	7	Robby Gordon	Chevrolet	Robby Gordon Motorsports	Harrah's	307	0	running	67	62400
33	20	07	Clint Bowyer	Chevrolet	Richard Childress Racing	Jack Daniel's	306	0	oil line	64	71225
34	6	16	Greg Biffle	Ford	Roush Racing	National Guard	306	0	running	61	82350
35	39	61	Chad Chaffin	Dodge	Front Row Motorsports	Oak Glove Company	306	0	running	58	62025
36	30	14	Sterling Marlin	Chevrolet	MB2 Motorsports	Principal Financial Group	303	1	running	60	61875
37	25	66	Jeff Green	Chevrolet	Haas CNC Racing	Best Buy	298	0	crash	52	69750
38	9	5	Kyle Busch	Chevrolet	Hendrick Motorsports	Kellogg's	291	0	running	49	79625
39	27	88	Dale Jarrett	Ford	Robert Yates Racing	UPS	289	0	crash	46	69500
40	14	26	Jamie McMurray	Ford	Roush Racing	Irwin Industrial Tools	272	0	crash	43	80350
41	38	49	Mike Bliss	Dodge	BAM Racing	WhatsOnline.com	262	0	engine	40	61210
42	19	55	Michael Waltrip	Dodge	Waltrip-Jasper Racing	NAPA Auto Parts	234	0	engine	37	61085
43	37	72	Brandon Whitt	Chevrolet	CJM Racing	Dutch Quality Stone	123	0	rear end	34	61286

== Timeline ==
Section reference:

- Start of race: Jeff Gordon started the race as the first-place driver.
- Lap 4: Kevin Harvick took over the lead from Jeff Gordon.
- Lap 71: Caution for debris; ended on lap 76.
- Lap 72: Matt Kenseth took over the lead from Kevin Harvick.
- Lap 73: Kevin Harvick took over the lead from Matt Kenseth.
- Lap 123: Brandon Whitt lost his vehicle's rear end.
- Lap 134: Jimmie Johnson took over the lead from Kevin Harvick.
- Lap 151: Caution for debris; ended on lap 157.
- Lap 152: Sterling Marlin took over the lead from Jimmie Johnson.
- Lap 153: Jimmie Johnson took over the lead from Sterling Marlin.
- Lap 162: Kevin Harvick took over the lead from Jimmie Johnson.
- Lap 188: Caution for oil on track; ended on lap 195.
- Lap 227: Caution for Robby Gordon and Chad Chiffin's joint accident; ended on lap 230.
- Lap 234: Michael Waltrip developed engine problems.
- Lap 253: Caution due to oil on track; ended on lap 257.
- Lap 255: David Gilliland took over the lead from Kevin Harvick.
- Lap 256: Mark Martin took over the lead from David Gilliland.
- Lap 260: Jimmie Johnson took over the lead from Mark Martin.
- Lap 261: Mark Martin took over the lead from Jimmie Johnson.
- Lap 262: Mike Bliss developed engine problems.
- Lap 265: Caution due to Mike Bliss' accident; ended on lap 271.
- Lap 272: Jamie McMurray suffered from his vehicle's terminal crash.
- Lap 274: Caution due to a five-car accident; the caution officially ended on lap 281.
- Lap 283: Kevin Harvick took over the lead from Mark Martin.
- Lap 289: Dale Jarrett suffered from his vehicle's terminal crash.
- Lap 292: Caution due to Sterling Marlin and Dale Jarrett's joint accident; ended on lap 296.
- Lap 298: Jeff Green suffered from his vehicle's terminal crash.
- Lap 300: Caution due to Jeff Green's accident; ended on lap 304.
- Lap 306: Clint Bowyer's vehicle developed a problematic oil line.
- Lap 307: Caution due to Casey Mears spinning off turn two; ended on lap 309.
- Finish: Kevin Harvick won the event.

== Standings after the race ==
Pos	Driver	Points	Differential
1	Jimmie Johnson	6332	0
2	Matt Kenseth	6269	-63
3 ▲	Denny Hamlin	6242	-90
3 ▲	Kevin Harvick	6242	-90
5 ▼	Dale Earnhardt Jr.	6217	-115
6	Jeff Gordon	6165	-167
7	Jeff Burton	6107	-225
8 ▲	Mark Martin	6059	-273
9 ▲	Kasey Kahne	6013	-319
10 ▼	Kyle Busch	5973	-359

Previous race: 2006 Dickies 500	Nextel Cup Series; 2006 season	Next race: 2006 Ford 400
