= 2006 Dickies 500 =

Race details
- Race 34 of 36 in the 2006 NASCAR Nextel Cup Series
- 2006 Dickies 500 program cover
- Date: November 5, 2006
- Location: Texas Motor Speedway, Fort Worth, Texas
- Course: Permanent racing facility
- Course length: 1.5 miles (2.414 km)
- Distance: 339 laps, 508.5 mi (818.351 km)
- Scheduled distance: 334 laps, 501 mi (806.281 km)
- Average speed: 134.891 miles per hour (217.086 km/h)

Pole position
Driver	Brian Vickers	Hendrick Motorsports
- Time: 27.518

Most laps led
Driver	Tony Stewart	Joe Gibbs Racing
- Laps: 278

Winner
No. 20	Tony Stewart	Joe Gibbs Racing

Television in the United States
- Network: NBC
- Announcers: Bill Weber, Benny Parsons, Wally Dallenbach Jr.

The 2006 Dickies 500 was a NASCAR Nextel Cup Series stock car race held on November 5, 2006 at Texas Motor Speedway in Fort Worth, Texas. Contested over 339 laps on the 1.5-mile (2.4-kilometre) asphalt quad oval, it was the thirty-fourth race of the 2006 NASCAR Nextel Cup Series season. The race was extended from 334 laps because of a green–white–checkered finish, and was won by Tony Stewart of Joe Gibbs Racing.

== Background ==
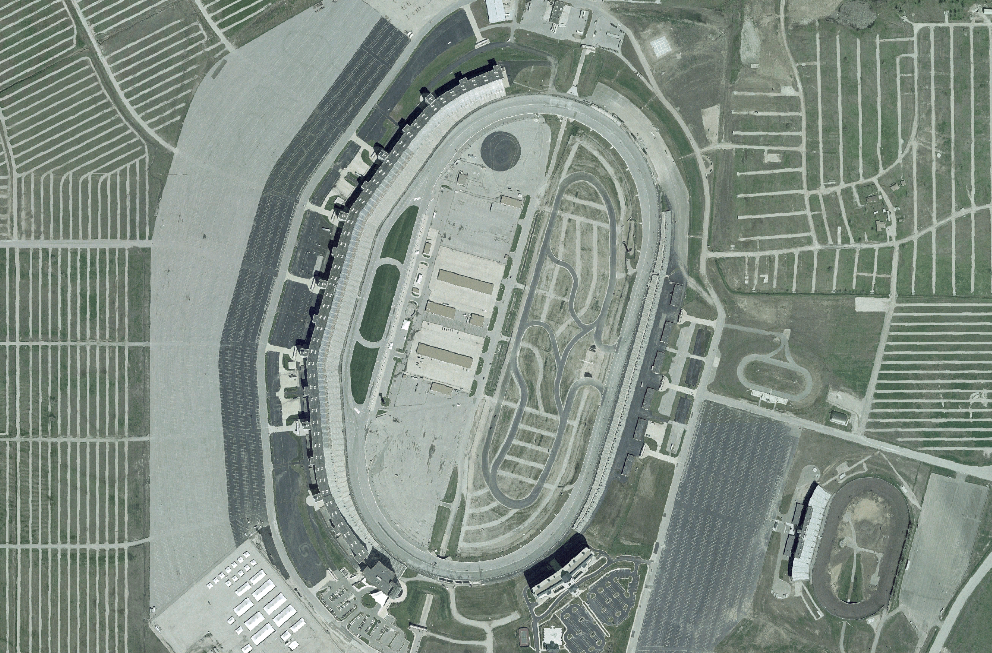
Texas Motor Speedway, the race track where the race was held.

Texas Motor Speedway is a four-turn quad-oval track that is 1.5 miles (2.4 kilometres) long. The track's turns are banked at twenty-four degrees, while the front stretch, the location of the finish line, is five degrees. The back stretch, opposite of the front, also has a five degree banking. The track layout is similar to Atlanta Motor Speedway and Charlotte Motor Speedway, tracks also owned by Speedway Motorsports.

== Qualifying ==
Pos	Car #	Driver	Make	Primary Sponsor	Speed	Time	Behind
1	25	Brian Vickers	Chevrolet	GMAC	196.235	27.518	0.000
2	19	Elliott Sadler	Dodge	Dodge Dealers / UAW	195.390	27.637	-0.119
3	2	Kurt Busch	Dodge	Miller Lite	194.854	27.713	-0.195
4	9	Kasey Kahne	Dodge	Dodge Dealers / UAW / Dodge Nitro	194.812	27.719	-0.201
5	48	Jimmie Johnson	Chevrolet	Lowe's	193.833	27.859	-0.341
6	11	Denny Hamlin	Chevrolet	FedEx Kinko's	193.562	27.898	-0.380
7	38	David Gilliland	Ford	Combos	193.368	27.926	-0.408
8	20	Tony Stewart	Chevrolet	The Home Depot	193.320	27.933	-0.415
9	7	Robby Gordon	Chevrolet	Menards / MAPEI	193.126	27.961	-0.443
10	8	Dale Earnhardt Jr	Chevrolet	Budweiser	193.098	27.965	-0.447
11	5	Kyle Busch	Chevrolet	CARQUEST	193.071	27.969	-0.451
12	10	Scott Riggs	Dodge	Valvoline / Stanley / "Cars" DVD	192.981	27.982	-0.464
13	43	Bobby Labonte	Dodge	Cheerios / Betty Crocker	192.960	27.985	-0.467
14	7	Clint Bowyer	Chevrolet	Jack Daniel's	192.898	27.994	-0.476
15	99	Carl Edwards	Ford	Office Depot	192.713	28.021	-0.503
16	01	Joe Nemechek	Chevrolet	U.S. Army	192.665	28.028	-0.510
17	40	David Stremme	Dodge	Lone Star Steakhouse / Saloon	192.500	28.052	-0.534
18	21	Ken Schrader	Ford	Little Debbie	192.472	28.056	-0.538
19	41	Reed Sorenson	Dodge	Target / Kraft	192.431	28.062	-0.544
20	88	Dale Jarrett	Ford	The UPS Store / Toys for Tots	192.363	28.072	-0.554
21	29	Kevin Harvick	Chevrolet	GM Goodwrench	192.102	28.110	-0.592
22	49	Mike Bliss	Dodge	WhatsOnline.com	192.089	28.112	-0.594
23	24	Jeff Gordon	Chevrolet	DuPont	192.082	28.113	-0.595
24	12	Ryan Newman	Dodge	Alltel	191.755	28.161	-0.643
25	42	Casey Mears	Dodge	Texaco / Havoline	191.741	28.163	-0.645
26	18	JJ Yeley	Chevrolet	Interstate Batteries	191.598	28.184	-0.666
27	66	Jeff Green	Chevrolet	Best Buy	191.374	28.217	-0.699
28	6	Mark Martin	Ford	AAA	191.354	28.220	-0.702
29	31	Jeff Burton	Chevrolet	Cingular Wireless	191.211	28.241	-0.723
30	22	Dave Blaney	Dodge	Caterpillar	191.178	28.246	-0.728
31	14	Sterling Marlin	Chevrolet	Waste Management	191.171	28.247	-0.729
32	15	Paul Menard	Chevrolet	Menards / Sylvania	191.164	28.248	-0.730
33	78	Kenny Wallace	Chevrolet	Furniture Row Racing	191.029	28.268	-0.750
34	1	Martin Truex Jr	Chevrolet	Bass Pro Shops / Tracker	190.867	28.292	-0.774
35	45	Kyle Petty	Dodge	Wells Fargo	190.860	28.293	-0.775
36	17	Matt Kenseth	Ford	DEWALT	190.712	28.315	-0.797
37	4	Ward Burton	Chevrolet	Lucas Oil Products	190.644	28.325	-0.807
38	55	Michael Waltrip	Dodge	NAPA Auto Parts	190.564	28.337	-0.819
39	16	Greg Biffle	Ford	National Guard / Charter Communications	190.040	28.415	-0.897
40	32	Travis Kvapil	Chevrolet	Tide-Downy	190.040	28.415	-0.897
41	96	Tony Raines	Chevrolet	DLP HDTV	189.860	28.442	-0.924
42	26	Jamie McMurray	Ford	Crown Royal	189.241	28.535	-1.017
43	44	Terry Labonte	Chevrolet	Kellogg's		28.520	
Failed to qualify
44	34	Chad Chaffin	Dodge	MyAutoLoan.com		28.453	
45	37	Bill Elliott	Dodge	R & J Racing		28.454	
46	61	Kevin Lepage	Dodge	Oak Gloves / RPM		28.538	
47	72	Mike Skinner	Chevrolet	Dutch Quality Stone		28.547	
48	60	David Ragan	Ford	Pennzoil Platinum		28.584	
49	74	Derrike Cope	Dodge	Sundance Vacations / Royal Admin.		28.824	
50	84	A.J. Allmendinger	Dodge	New York Red Bulls		29.018	

== Race recap ==
The eighth Chase race, the Dickies 500, was run on November 5, 2006 at Texas Motor Speedway in Fort Worth, Texas. Brian Vickers, the last car to qualify, edged Elliott Sadler, next to last to take time, for the pole in this race. After a DNF in Martinsville just two races ago, Jeff Burton lost an engine and fell more than 60 laps down; after more than one hour of repair, Burton finished 38th. Another chaser, Mark Martin spun out after Ken Schrader cut a tire on lap 174, resulting in a 22nd-place finish for Martin. With less than 11 laps to go, chaser Kasey Kahne's engine expired causing the 11th caution period and finished 33rd with a 2nd straight DNF. With a few laps to go, Kevin Harvick spun Scott Riggs to cause a caution and the race went into a green–white–checkered finish. On the final restart, Tony Stewart held off Jimmie Johnson to win. Following the race, Craig Curione, the front tire carrier for the No. 10 Evernham Dodge of Riggs, shoved Harvick, his wife Delana and NASCAR official John Sacco to the pavement after Harvick was blamed for a late race incident that led to the green–white–checkered finish. Curione was suspended indefinitely, fired from Evernham Motorsports, and fined $10,000 by NASCAR, while Sacco suffered a sprained ankle.

== Results ==
POS	ST	#	DRIVER	SPONSOR / OWNER	CAR	LAPS	MONEY	STATUS	LED	PTS
1	8	20	Tony Stewart	The Home Depot (Joe Gibbs)	Chevrolet	339	521361	running	278	190
2	5	48	Jimmie Johnson	Lowe's (Rick Hendrick)	Chevrolet	339	364236	running	1	175
3	21	29	Kevin Harvick	GM Goodwrench (Richard Childress)	Chevrolet	339	254186	running	0	165
4	11	5	Kyle Busch	Carquest (Rick Hendrick)	Chevrolet	339	204250	running	2	165
5	14	07	Clint Bowyer	Jack Daniel's (Richard Childress)	Chevrolet	339	176625	running	3	160
6	10	8	Dale Earnhardt Jr.	Budweiser (Dale Earnhardt, Inc.)	Chevrolet	339	187141	running	1	155
7	25	42	Casey Mears	Texaco / Havoline (Chip Ganassi)	Dodge	339	174208	running	0	146
8	3	2	Kurt Busch	Miller Lite (Roger Penske)	Dodge	339	164833	running	37	147
9	23	24	Jeff Gordon	DuPont (Rick Hendrick)	Chevrolet	339	166586	running	0	138
10	6	11	Denny Hamlin	FedEx Kinko's (Joe Gibbs)	Chevrolet	339	121200	running	0	134
11	35	45	Kyle Petty	Wells Fargo (Petty Enterprises)	Dodge	339	144808	running	0	130
12	36	17	Matt Kenseth	DeWalt (Jack Roush)	Ford	339	152791	running	1	132
13	27	66	Jeff Green	Best Buy (Gene Haas)	Chevrolet	339	130058	running	0	124
14	34	1	Martin Truex Jr.	Bass Pro Shops / Tracker (Dale Earnhardt, Inc.)	Chevrolet	339	126183	running	0	121
15	15	99	Carl Edwards	Office Depot (Jack Roush)	Ford	339	120050	running	0	118
16	13	43	Bobby Labonte	Cheerios / Betty Crocker (Petty Enterprises)	Dodge	338	138186	running	0	115
17	19	41	Reed Sorenson	Target / Kraft (Chip Ganassi)	Dodge	338	108550	running	0	112
18	16	01	Joe Nemechek	U.S. Army (Bobby Ginn)	Chevrolet	338	126445	running	0	109
19	41	96	Tony Raines	DLP HDTV (Bill Saunders)	Chevrolet	338	99650	running	0	106
20	26	18	J.J. Yeley	Interstate Batteries (Joe Gibbs)	Chevrolet	338	136675	running	3	108
21	7	38	David Gilliland	Combos (Yates Racing)	Ford	338	126908	running	0	100
22	28	6	Mark Martin	AAA (Jack Roush)	Ford	338	113475	running	0	97
23	22	49	Mike Bliss	WhatsOnline.com (Beth Ann Morgenthau)	Dodge	338	111083	running	0	94
24	17	40	David Stremme	Lone Star Steakhouse & Saloon (Chip Ganassi)	Dodge	338	115722	running	1	96
25	37	4	Ward Burton	Hefty / Lucas Oil Products (Larry McClure)	Chevrolet	338	98275	running	0	88
26	42	26	Jamie McMurray	Crown Royal (Jack Roush)	Ford	338	141500	running	4	90
27	1	25	Brian Vickers	GMAC (Rick Hendrick)	Chevrolet	338	125175	running	5	87
28	40	32	Travis Kvapil	Tide / Downy (Cal Wells)	Chevrolet	337	96775	running	0	79
29	20	88	Dale Jarrett	The UPS Store / Toys for Tots (Yates Racing)	Ford	334	126150	running	0	76
30	33	78	Kenny Wallace	Furniture Row Racing (Barney Visser)	Chevrolet	333	94375	running	0	73
31	12	10	Scott Riggs	Valvoline / Stanley / "Cars" DVD (James Rocco)	Dodge	331	93675	crash	0	70
32	30	22	Dave Blaney	Caterpillar (Bill Davis)	Dodge	330	93475	running	0	67
33	4	9	Kasey Kahne	Dodge Dealers / UAW / Dodge Nitro (Ray Evernham)	Dodge	328	131439	engine	2	69
34	24	12	Ryan Newman	Alltel (Roger Penske)	Dodge	328	138483	running	0	61
35	39	16	Greg Biffle	National Guard (Jack Roush)	Ford	324	113075	crash	0	58
36	43	44	Terry Labonte	Kellogg's / Terry Labonte Tribute (Rick Hendrick)	Chevrolet	316	92650	running	0	55
37	2	19	Elliott Sadler	Dodge Dealers / UAW (Ray Evernham)	Dodge	310	123441	running	0	52
38	29	31	Jeff Burton	Cingular Wireless (Richard Childress)	Chevrolet	269	118595	running	0	49
39	9	7	Robby Gordon	Menards / MAPEI (Robby Gordon)	Chevrolet	256	92050	engine	0	46
40	31	14	Sterling Marlin	Waste Management (Bobby Ginn)	Chevrolet	208	91850	crash	1	48
41	32	15	Paul Menard	Menards / Sylvania (Dale Earnhardt, Inc.)	Chevrolet	194	91635	engine	0	40
42	18	21	Ken Schrader	Little Debbie (Wood Brothers)	Ford	173	118649	crash	0	37
43	38	55	Michael Waltrip	NAPA Auto Parts (Doug Bawel)	Dodge	109	91564	engine	0	34
Failed to qualify, withdrew, or driver changes:
POS	NAME	NBR	SPONSOR	OWNER	CAR					
44	Chad Chaffin	34	MyAutoLoan.com	Bob Jenkins	Dodge					
45	Bill Elliott	37	R & J Racing	John Carter	Dodge					
46	Kevin Lepage	61	Oak Gloves / RPM	Bob Jenkins	Dodge					
47	Mike Skinner	72	Dutch Quality Stone	Bryan Mullet	Chevrolet					
48	David Ragan	60	Pennzoil Platinum	Mark Simo	Ford					
49	Derrike Cope	74	Sundance Vacations / Royal Admin.	Raynard McGlynn	Dodge					
50	A.J. Allmendinger	84	New York Red Bulls	Dietrich Mateschitz	Dodge					

== Race statistics ==
- Time of race: 3:46:11
- Average speed: 134.891 miles per hour (217.086 km/h)
- Pole speed: 196.235 miles per hour (315.810 km/h)
- Cautions: 12 for 51 laps
- Margin of victory: 0.272 seconds
- Lead changes: 23
- Percent of race run under caution: 15%
- Average green flag run: 24 laps

Previous race: 2006 Bass Pro Shops MBNA 500	Nextel Cup Series; 2006 season	Next race: 2006 Checker Auto Parts 500
