= Phoenix Racing (NASCAR team) =

American racing team

- Owner: James Finch
- Base: Lynn Haven, Florida Spartanburg, South Carolina (2004–2013)
- Series: ARCA Menards Series East; Super Late Models
- Race drivers: ARCA Menards Series East: 1. Jake Finch; Super Late Models: 51. Jake Finch
- Manufacturer: Toyota; Chevrolet
- Opened: 1990

Career
- Debut: Sprint Cup Series: 1990 Peak AntiFreeze 500 (Dover); Nationwide Series: 1989 All Pro 300 (Charlotte); Craftsman Truck Series: 2004 Kroger 200 (Richmond); ARCA Menards Series East: 2022 Pensacola 200 (5 Flags)
- Latest race: Sprint Cup Series: 2013 Advocare 500 (Atlanta); Nationwide Series: 2013 Subway Firecracker 250 (Daytona)
- Races competed: Total: 859; Sprint Cup Series: 251; Nationwide Series: 543; Craftsman Truck Series: 1 ARCA Racing Series: 64
- Drivers' Championships: 0
- Race victories: Total: 14; Sprint Cup Series: 1 Nationwide Series: 13; Craftsman Truck Series: 0 ARCA Racing Series: 10
- Pole positions: Total: 18; Sprint Cup Series: 0 Nationwide Series: 10; Craftsman Truck Series: 0 ARCA Racing Series: 8

Phoenix Racing is a motorsports team that currently competes part-time in the ARCA Menards Series East fielding the No. 1 Toyota Camry and various Super Late Model events fielding the No. 51 Chevrolet SS for Jake Finch. Owned by Florida businessman James Finch, the team fielded NASCAR entries across the top three series from 1989 through 2013. The team fielded a wide variety of drivers and often changed manufacturers, though it often maintained a relationship with Hendrick Motorsports. In the Cup Series, Phoenix Racing was victorious just once in 251 starts over 24 seasons.

In 2013, Phoenix Racing was sold to Turner Scott Motorsports co-owner Harry Scott Jr., who renamed the team HScott Motorsports in 2014. Three years later, HScott Motorsports shut down. Phoenix Racing would reopen its doors in 2020 to help Finch's son Jake start his racing career in Outlaw Late Models locally in Florida, then moving up to Super Late Models in 2021, and moving up to the ARCA Menards Series East in 2022.

== NASCAR Cup Series ==
=== Car No. 51 history ===
==== Early days ====
Phoenix Racing began racing in the Cup Series in 1990, when it fielded the No. 51 Plasti-Kote Chevrolet Lumina for Jeff Purvis. In four races, Purvis failed to finish a race, his best finishing being a 31st at North Wilkesboro Speedway. Phoenix attempted to run a full schedule in 1991, but soon cut back to a part-time schedule, completing six races in total. Due to a lack of funding, the team only ran two races in 1992, with Finch's company Phoenix Construction of Panama City, Florida, serving as sponsor. In 1993, the team ran all of the restrictor plate races on the schedule, except for the Daytona 500, for which they failed to qualify. For 1994, they picked up sponsorship from Country Time and had planned to run a limited schedule with Neil Bonnett driving. Bonnett was killed in a practice crash at Daytona before the 1994 Daytona 500, and Purvis was brought back to drive the car. In six races, his best finish was 21st. Phoenix changed its number to 44 in 1995, and ran six more races with Purvis and Jackaroo Sauce, only finishing one race. MCA Records became the new sponsor for 1996, and the team had two top-ten qualification starts, but could not finish higher than twelfth.

==== 2000s: Part-time and Talladega win ====
After staying out of Cup for several years, Finch purchased a number of Ford Tauruses from Bill Elliott Racing, and ran all of the 2001 schedule's restrictor plate races with Purvis driving the No. 51, only finishing one race. In 2002, the team picked up funding from Miccosukee Gaming and switched to the No. 09. Driver Geoffrey Bodine had a third-place finish in the Daytona 500, and later had a 2nd-place qualification at the Pepsi 400. Mike Wallace ran a limited schedule for Phoenix in 2003, and had two top-ten finishes. Scott Pruett and Buckshot Jones also ran one race deals for the team that season, during which they switched to Dodge.

The team began 2004 with Johnny Benson Jr., who had also signed to drive the #1 car full-time for Phoenix in the Busch Series for 2002, scheduled to run at least a minimum of seven races, mostly at the longer speedways where the team was stronger. The team would attempt most of the schedule with Benson sharing the ride with Joe Ruttman, who had not raced full-time in the Cup Series since the early 1990s.

After Benson ran the Daytona 500, Phoenix came to Rockingham with their focus being on their Busch effort for the weekend. This was evident on the entry they filled out for the 09, where the team listed Ruttman as the driver but forgot to include Miccosukee as the sponsor. Finch did not even bring a proper crew to the race, with the intent being that they would run the Cup car for a few laps before pulling off and collecting the last place prize. Due to withdrawals from several teams, the potential field was reduced to 43 cars and this meant that every car that entered was assured of making the field.

For that weekend’s Cup race, the Subway 400 Ruttman ran one qualifying lap and was significantly off the pace, settling for a 40th place starting spot. To further complicate things, the crew Finch had assembled for the weekend was not in their pit box when the race began and once NASCAR discovered this, they ordered Phoenix to park the 09 for the remainder of the race. Ruttman collected $54,196 for a last-place finish. The team later said they would be "legitimate racing" after the incident, although Ruttman pulled out of each race he ran early citing some mechanical issue. Benson was eventually let go from his contract altogether and Ruttman’s involvement was scaled back significantly although he would return toward the end of the season and would eventually make seven starts for the team. Bobby Hamilton Jr. drove six races for the team starting at Charlotte, and Mike Wallace would return and record the team’s first top ten since 2002 at Richmond. Tony Raines would drive one race at Dover before retiring early, while Scott Pruett would make the race at Indianapolis but pulled out due in part to injuries received in a practice crash. Johnny Sauter would join the team for the last few races after losing his ride at Richard Childress Racing, crashing out late in the running at Phoenix.

Sauter drove ten races in the No. 09 in 2005, and had a ninth-place finish at Phoenix International Raceway. Late in the season, Bobby Hamilton and Reed Sorenson drove the 09 at Martinsville and Homestead, respectively.

Beginning in 2006, Phoenix abbreviated the 09's schedule even further, switching back and forth between Dodge and Ford. Mike Wallace ran just three races and failed to finish higher than seventeenth. Mayfield ran the season-ending Ford 400, but did not finish due to an oil leak. Wallace had a fourth-place finish in the 2007 Daytona 500, but the team did not qualify for another race until the final two races of the year, when Sterling Marlin drove. For 2008, Marlin ran 10–12 races for Phoenix.

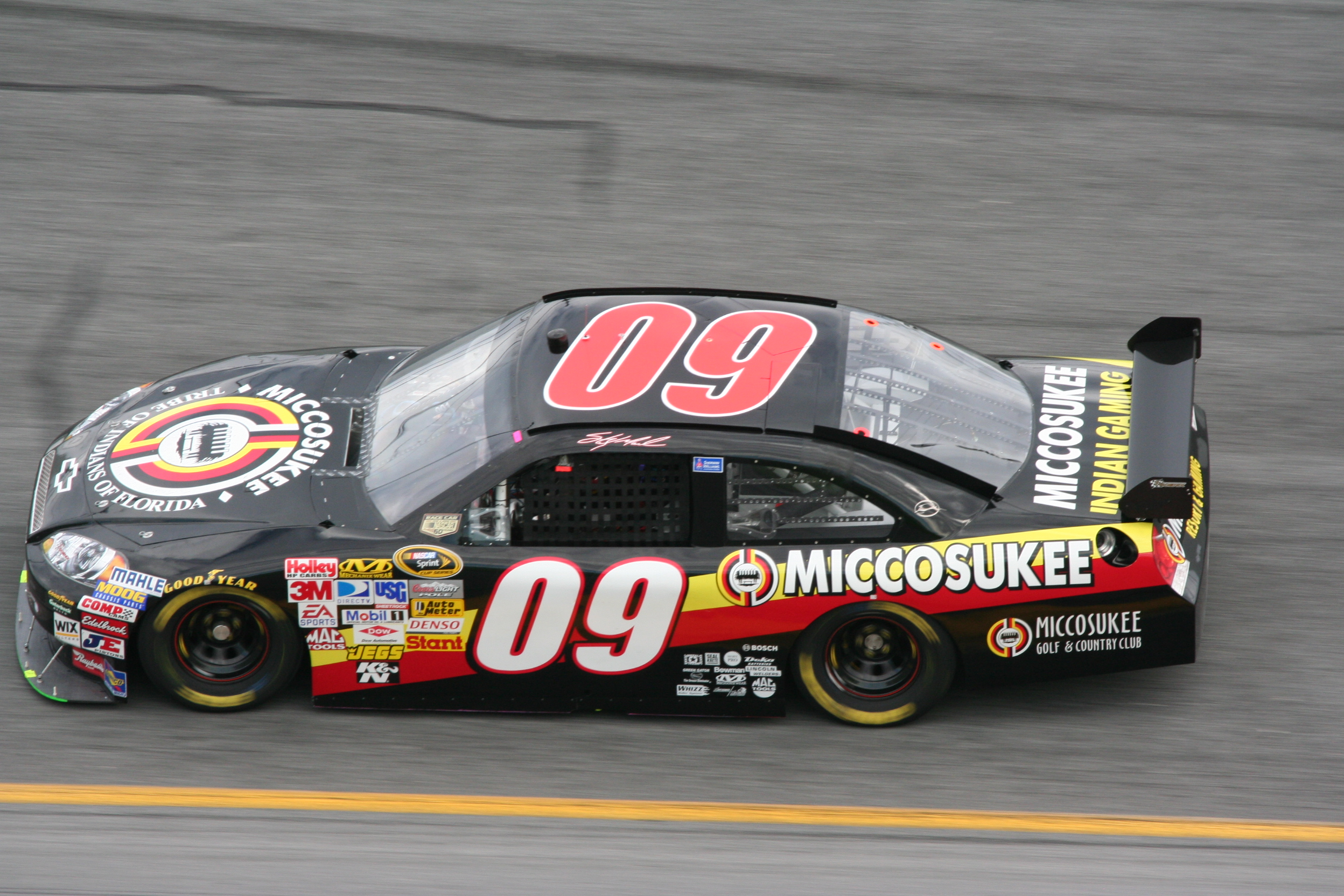
The No. 09 car

Phoenix Racing announced for 2009 that they would be running two different makes of cars for the upcoming Sprint Cup season. The No. 09 was shared by Marlin, Phoenix's Nationwide Series driver Mike Bliss, and Brad Keselowski, who at the time was a developmental driver for Hendrick Motorsports. Ron Fellows also ran as a road course ringer. The team fielded purchased Ganassi Dodges for Marlin and Bliss, and purchased Hendrick Chevrolets for Keselowski and Fellows.

After 19 years in the Cup Series Phoenix Racing finally won its first race, taking the Aaron's 499 with Keselowski behind the wheel. Keselowski turned Carl Edwards when Edwards attempted a second block on Keselowski's passing move, but Keselowski held his ground as Edwards wrecked and drove to the finish to lead his only lap of the day and win the race.

==== 2010s: full-time and sale ====
Former Earnhardt Ganassi Racing driver Aric Almirola was hired to drive for the team in 2010. The team's competitiveness was put into question when it lost its longtime sponsor Miccosukee at the beginning of the season. Almirola failed to qualify three of the first seven events, including the Daytona 500, and start and parked in its four starts due to lack of funds. Almirola left the team after the race at Phoenix to focus on his Truck Series efforts, and was replaced by Mike Bliss and a handful of other drivers, including (Xfinity Series driver) Landon Cassill, (Former F1 driver) Jan Magnussen, and (2000 NASCAR Winston Cup Series champion) Bobby Labonte. Phoenix Racing returned in 2011 despite rumors that Finch had been trying to sell the team. Bill Elliott drove the first 4 races before Landon Cassill took over the ride with sponsorship from Security Benefit. In June 2011, prior to the Kansas race, the team changed the car number to No. 51, which Phoenix Racing originally used when it first competed in the then-Winston Cup Series. He would later have a best career finish of 9th at Michigan.

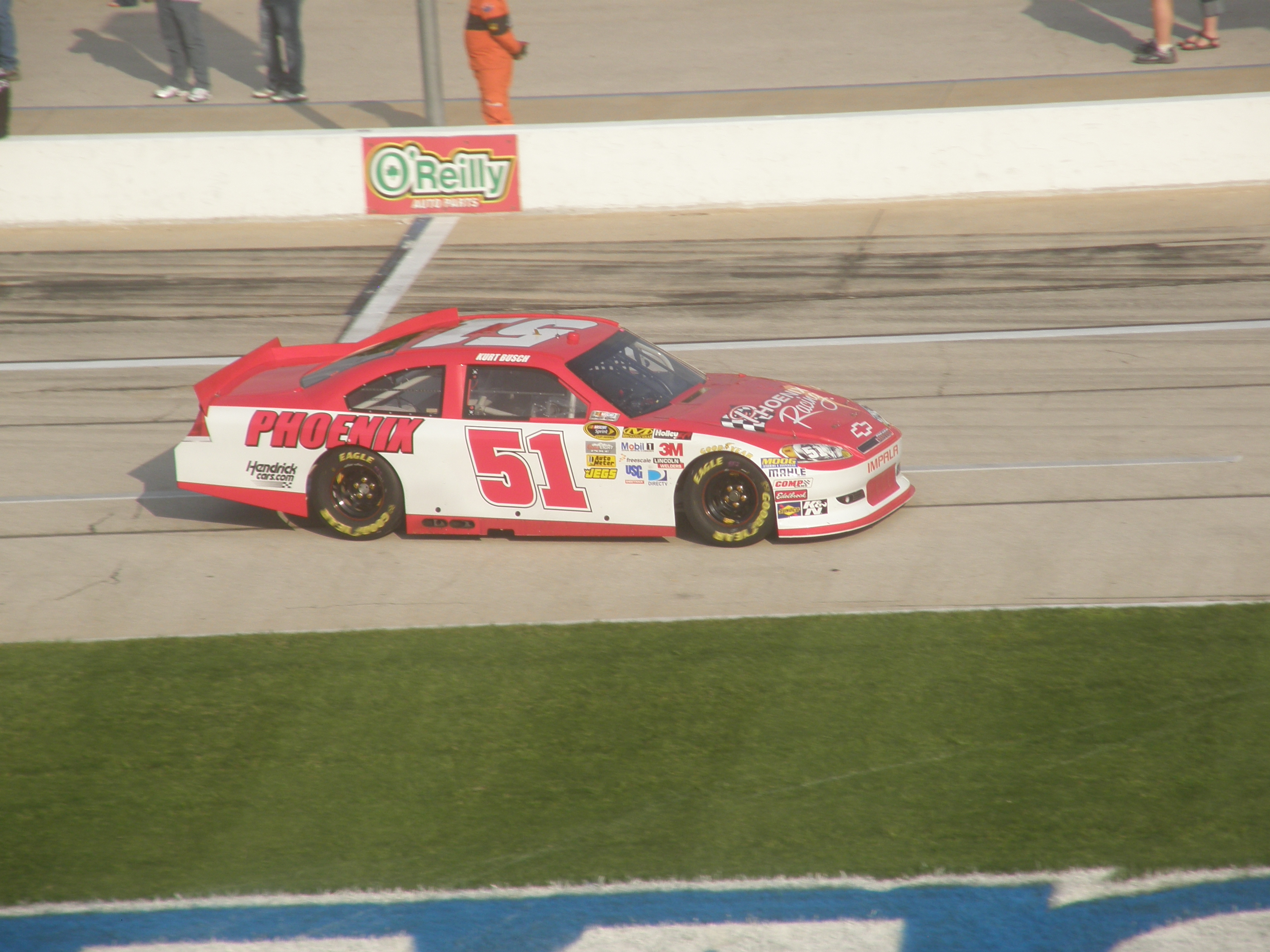
Kurt Busch driving the No. 51 at Texas Motor Speedway in 2012

For 2012, Cassill was replaced by 2004 Cup Champion Kurt Busch, who had been released from the No. 22 car at Penske Racing due to on-track incidents and off-track temperament, including a profanity-laced tirade directed at ESPN reporter Jerry Punch. The team ran most of the season unsponsored, with HendrickCars.com, Monster Energy, and TAG Heuer coming on for single races. At Talladega in May, Busch ran a "ME" scheme from the movie Talladega Nights that Will Ferrell's character (a similarly controversial star driver) ran in a comeback at the track in one of the film's final scene. Busch's best finish with the team was an impressive 3rd-place finish at Sonoma Raceway after racing for the lead with Clint Bowyer with under ten laps to go. Outside of that high point, Busch was involved in many accidents trying to get the most out of his equipment. He was also suspended for the June race at Pocono after expletives aimed at a reporter after a Nationwide Series race at Dover. David Reutimann replaced Busch in that race, and Busch was welcomed back following a vote by team members. Busch would leave the team following the fall Talladega race for Furniture Row Racing, and was supposed to be replaced by Regan Smith (the former driver with Furniture Row) until Dale Earnhardt Jr. suffered a concussion in the aftermath of the Talladega race and Smith was needed as a sub for the Charlotte and Kansas races in the Chase. A. J. Allmendinger, coincidentally also released from Penske, in the No. 22 car, due to a failed substance test, drove the No. 51 for those two races, with Smith returning later in the year.

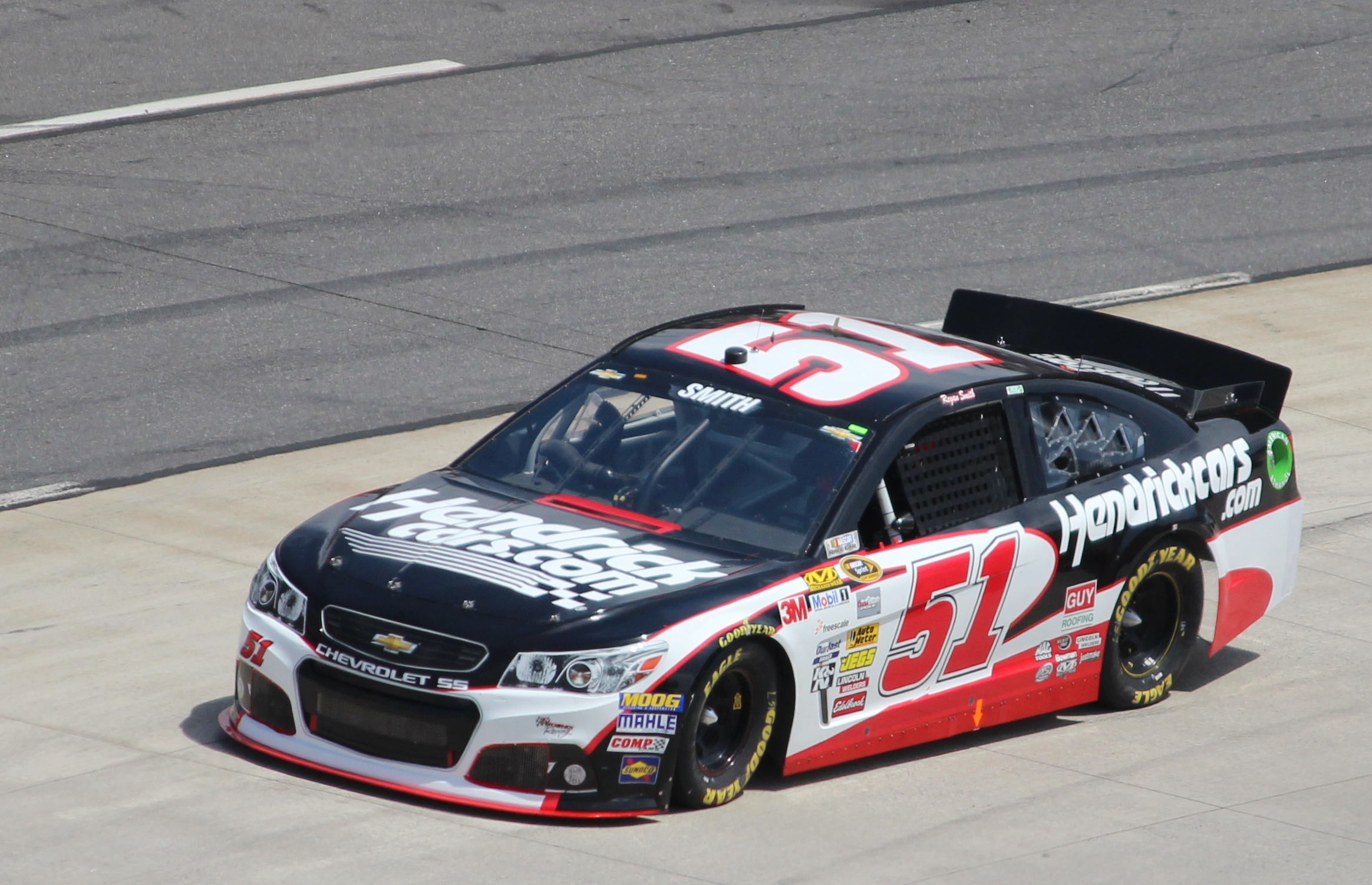
Regan Smith in 2013.

For 2013, the team returned full-time, fielding a number of different drivers. The team signed Guy Roofing, a company from the team's hometown of Spartanburg, South Carolina, as the sponsor for the Daytona 500 and two other early season races. Regan Smith drove the car in the 500 to a strong seventh-place finish, and would run five other races that season with a best finish of sixth. Allmendinger ran 9 races, including running the retro Country Time scheme Phoenix had run in the past, with three top 15 finishes all in his first four starts. Austin Dillon ran four races, and Ryan Truex made his series debut at Bristol in the fall. Bobby Labonte, Owen Kelly, Mike Bliss, Jacques Villeneuve, and Brendan Gaughan would all make single starts for the team in 2013.

In spite of early success (the team was ranked 9th in owners points after the fifth race of the season) and a more affordable car model in the Gen 6 Chevy SS, lack of long-term funding continued to plague the team. Citing this recurring lack of stable sponsorship, Finch announced in May 2013 that he would close operations after the 2013 Brickyard 400. In late June, Finch announced that he was selling his team. The team found a buyer July 17 and Finch stopped sponsoring the team after Indianapolis. He would continue to own the team through Labor Day weekend, providing assistance in the transition to new ownership. It was announced on August 28 that Harry Scott Jr. of Turner Scott Motorsports had bought the team.

Finch's last race as owner was the Labor Day race at Atlanta, where Mike Bliss drove the No. 51 Phoenix Construction Chevrolet to a 33rd-place finish, running six laps down at the checkered flag.

==== Sprint Cup Series Results ====
Year	Driver	No.	Make	1	2	3	4	5	6	7	8	9	10	11	12	13	14	15	16	17	18	19	20	21	22	23	24	25	26	27	28	29	30	31	32	33	34	35	36	Owners	Pts
1990	Jeff Purvis	51	Chevy	DAY	RCH	CAR	ATL	DAR	BRI	NWS	MAR	TAL	CLT	DOV	SON	POC	MCH	DAY	POC	TAL	GLN	MCH	BRI	DAR	RCH	DOV; 33	MAR	NWS; 31	CLT	CAR; 38	PHO; 36	ATL								55th	238
1991	Jeff Purvis	51	Olds	DAY; 36	RCH	CAR; 35	ATL; 24	DAR	BRI	NWS; DNQ	MAR	TAL; 30	CLT	DOV	SON	POC	MCH; DNQ	DAY; 30	POC	TAL; DNQ	GLN	MCH	BRI	DAR	RCH	DOV; DNQ	MAR	NWS												45th	399
1991	Jeff Purvis	51	Chevy																										CLT; DNQ	CAR	PHO; 38	ATL								45th	399
1992	Jeff Purvis	51	Chevy	DAY	CAR	RCH	ATL	DAR	BRI	NWS	MAR	TAL	CLT	DOV	SON	POC	MCH	DAY	POC	TAL	GLN	MCH; 27	BRI	DAR	RCH	DOV	MAR	NWS	CLT	CAR	PHO; 36	ATL								56th	148
1993	Jeff Purvis	51	Chevy	DAY; DNQ	CAR	RCH	ATL	DAR	BRI	NWS	MAR	TAL; 39	SON	CLT	DOV	POC	MCH	DAY; 23	NHA	POC	TAL; 21	GLN	MCH	BRI	DAR	RCH	DOV	MAR	NWS	CLT	CAR	PHO	ATL							54th	341
1994	Neil Bonnett	51	Chevy	DAY; Wth	CAR	RCH																																		46th	484
1994	Jeff Purvis	51	Chevy				ATL; 21	DAR	BRI	NWS	MAR	TAL; 35	SON	CLT	DOV	POC	MCH; 27	DAY; 38	NHA	POC	TAL; 36	IND; 34	GLN	MCH	BRI	DAR	RCH	DOV	MAR	NWS	CLT	CAR	PHO; DNQ	ATL						46th	484
1995	Jeff Purvis	44	Chevy	DAY; 38	CAR	RCH	ATL; 37	DAR	BRI	NWS	MAR	TAL; 29	SON	CLT; DNQ	DOV	POC	MCH; 39	DAY; 39	NHA	POC	TAL; 42	IND; DNQ	GLN	MCH	BRI	DAR	RCH	DOV	MAR	NWS	CLT; DNQ	CAR	PHO	ATL; DNQ						47th	391
1996	Jeff Purvis	44	Chevy	DAY; 12	CAR	RCH	ATL	DAR	BRI	NWS	MAR	TAL; 35	SON	CLT	DOV	POC	MCH	DAY; 21	NHA	POC	TAL; 40	IND; DNQ	GLN	MCH	BRI	DAR	RCH	DOV	MAR	NWS	CLT	CAR	PHO	ATL						48th	328
2001	Jeff Purvis	51	Ford	DAY; 43	CAR	LVS	ATL	DAR	BRI	TEX	MAR	TAL; 34	CAL	RCH	CLT	DOV	MCH	POC	SON	DAY; 42	CHI	NHA	POC	IND	GLN	MCH	BRI	DAR	RCH	DOV	KAN	CLT	MAR	TAL; 42	PHO	CAR	HOM	ATL	NHA	54th	169
2002	Geoff Bodine	09	Ford	DAY; 3	CAR	LVS	ATL	DAR	BRI	TEX	MAR	TAL; 12	CAL	RCH	CLT	DOV	POC	MCH	SON	DAY; 10	CHI	NHA	POC	IND; 40	GLN	MCH	BRI	DAR	RCH; 38	NHA	DOV	KAN	TAL; DNQ	CLT	MAR	ATL; DNQ	CAR	PHO	HOM; DNQ	44th	590
2003	Mike Wallace	09	Dodge	DAY; 9	CAR	LVS	ATL	DAR	BRI	TEX	TAL; 30	MAR	CAL	RCH	CLT	DOV	POC	MCH											RCH; 12	NHA	DOV	TAL; 10	KAN; 32	CLT	MAR	ATL; DNQ	PHO; 26	CAR	HOM; DNQ	44th	788
2003	Scott Pruett	09	Dodge																SON; 34																					44th	788
2003	Buckshot Jones	09	Dodge																	DAY; 17	CHI	NHA	POC	IND	GLN	MCH	BRI	DAR												44th	788
2004	Johnny Benson	09	Dodge	DAY; 27		LVS; 31				TEX; 40		TAL; 29																												38th	1647
2004	Joe Ruttman	09	Dodge		CAR; 43		ATL; 43	DAR; 43	BRI; 42		MAR; 43		CAL; 43																		DOV; 41									38th	1647
2004	Bobby Hamilton Jr.	09	Dodge											RCH; 17	CLT; 42					DAY; 42	CHI; 41	NHA; 19	POC			MCH; 38														38th	1647
2004	Tony Raines	09	Dodge													DOV; 40	POC	MCH	SON																					38th	1647
2004	Scott Pruett	09	Dodge																					IND; 42	GLN															38th	1647
2004	Mike Wallace	09	Dodge																								BRI; 28	CAL	RCH; 7	NHA; 34		TAL; 18	KAN							38th	1647
2004	Johnny Sauter	09	Dodge																															CLT; 24	MAR	ATL; DNQ	PHO; 39	DAR; 29	HOM; DNQ	38th	1647
2005	Johnny Sauter	09	Dodge	DAY; DNQ	CAL	LVS; DNQ	ATL	BRI; DNQ	MAR; 41	TEX; 41	PHO; 9	TAL; 16	DAR; DNQ	RCH; 41	CLT; 40	DOV	POC	MCH	SON	DAY; 17	CHI	NHA	POC	IND	GLN	MCH	BRI; DNQ	CAL	RCH; 28	NHA	DOV	TAL; DNQ	KAN	CLT; 16		ATL; DNQ	TEX; DNQ	PHO; 39		42nd	1053
2005	Bobby Hamilton	09	Dodge																																MAR; 39					42nd	1053
2005	Reed Sorenson	09	Dodge																																				HOM; 28	42nd	1053
2006	Mike Wallace	09	Dodge	DAY; 24	CAL	LVS	ATL	BRI	MAR	TEX	PHO																BRI; DNQ	CAL	RCH; DNQ	NHA	DOV	KAN								50th	422
2006	Mike Wallace	09	Ford									TAL; DNQ	RCH	DAR	CLT	DOV	POC	MCH	SON	DAY; 23	CHI	NHA	POC	IND	GLN	MCH							TAL; 17	CLT	MAR	ATL	TEX			50th	422
2006	Jeremy Mayfield	09	Chevy																																			PHO; DNQ	HOM; 42	50th	422
2007	Mike Wallace	09	Chevy	DAY; 4	CAL	LVS	ATL	BRI	MAR	TEX	PHO	TAL; DNQ	RCH	DAR	CLT	DOV	POC	MCH	SON	NHA	DAY; DNQ	CHI	IND	POC	GLN	MCH	BRI	CAL	RCH	NHA	DOV	KAN								52nd	223
2007	Sterling Marlin	09	Chevy																														TAL; DNQ	CLT	MAR	ATL	TEX	PHO; 25	HOM; 33	52nd	223
2008	Sterling Marlin	09	Chevy	DAY; DNQ	CAL	LVS	ATL	BRI	MAR	TEX	PHO	TAL; 22	RCH; 25	DAR	CLT	DOV	POC	MCH	SON	NHA	DAY; 41	CHI	IND	POC	GLN	MCH	BRI; 43	CAL	RCH; DNQ	NHA	DOV	KAN	TAL; 42	CLT	MAR; DNQ	ATL	TEX	PHO; 32	HOM; 29	46th	392
2009	Brad Keselowski	09	Chevy	DAY; DNQ								TAL; 1								NHA; 6	DAY; 24								RCH; 38							TAL; 8				38th	1918
2009	Sterling Marlin	09	Dodge		CAL; DNQ	LVS; DNQ		BRI; 40	MAR; DNQ		PHO; 40			DAR; 42			POC; 39	MCH; 41					IND; DNQ	POC; 38										CLT; DNQ	MAR; 35					38th	1918
2009	Mike Bliss	09	Dodge				ATL; 43			TEX; 42			RCH; 37		CLT; 43	DOV; 40						CHI; 40				MCH; 38		ATL; 41			DOV; 40	KAN; 41	CAL; 43				TEX; DNQ			38th	1918
2009	Ron Fellows	09	Chevy																SON; 27						GLN; 29															38th	1918
2009	Aric Almirola	09	Dodge																								BRI; DNQ			NHA; 29										38th	1918
2009	David Gilliland	09	Chevy																																			PHO; 30		38th	1918
2009	David Stremme	09	Chevy																																				HOM; DNQ	38th	1918
2010	Aric Almirola	09	Chevy	DAY; DNQ	CAL; 43	LVS; 43	ATL; DNQ	BRI; 39	MAR; 41	PHO; DNQ																														39th	1889
2010	Mike Bliss	09	Chevy								TEX; 42	TAL; 10	RCH; 40	DAR; DNQ	DOV; 40	CLT; DNQ				NHA; DNQ																				39th	1889
2010	Terry Cook	09	Chevy														POC; DNQ																							39th	1889
2010	Landon Cassill	09	Chevy															MCH; 38						POC; 41		MCH; 38		ATL; DNQ						CLT; 42			TEX; 40			39th	1889
2010	Jan Magnussen	09	Chevy																SON; 12																					39th	1889
2010	Bobby Labonte	09	Chevy																		DAY; 16	CHI; 29	IND; 31		GLN; 35		BRI; 38		RCH; 39	NHA; 39	DOV; 27	KAN; 41	CAL; 38		MAR; 43	TAL; 38		PHO; 20	HOM; 22	39th	1889
2011	Bill Elliott	09	Chevy	DAY; 12	PHO; 23	LVS; 30	BRI; 29																																	30th	618
2011	Landon Cassill	09	Chevy					CAL; 24	MAR; 26	TEX; 28	TAL; 31	RCH; 31	DAR; 29	DOV; 30	CLT; 35																									30th	618
2011	Landon Cassill	51	Chevy													KAN; 35	POC; 24	MCH; 12		DAY; 26	KEN; 23	NHA; 26	IND; 20	POC; 27		MCH; 31		ATL; 22	RCH; 25	CHI; 30	NHA; 33	DOV; 31	KAN; 17	CLT; 28	TAL; 16	MAR; 42	TEX; 26	PHO; 29	HOM; 36	30th	618
2011	Boris Said	51	Chevy																SON; 28						GLN; 22															30th	618
2011	Mike Bliss	51	Chevy																								BRI; 29													30th	618
2012	Kurt Busch	51	Chevy	DAY; 39	PHO; 15	LVS; 35	BRI; 18	CAL; 9	MAR; 33	TEX; 13	KAN; 17	RCH; 28	TAL; 20	DAR; 21	CLT; 27	DOV; 24		MCH; 30	SON; 3	KEN; 19	DAY; 35	NHA; 24	IND; 36	POC; 30	GLN; 31	MCH; 30	BRI; 28	ATL; 13	RCH; 28	CHI; 32	NHA; 35	DOV; 23	TAL; 39							27th	667
2012	David Reutimann	51	Chevy														POC; 21																							27th	667
2012	A. J. Allmendinger	51	Chevy																															CLT; 24	KAN; 35	MAR; 28	TEX; 36			27th	667
2012	Regan Smith	51	Chevy																																			PHO; 24	HOM; 30	27th	667
2013	Regan Smith	51	Chevy	DAY; 7					MAR; 22		KAN; 22		TAL; 6	DAR; 24	CLT; 17																									30th	633
2013	A. J. Allmendinger	51	Chevy		PHO; 11		BRI; 13	CAL; 16									POC; 33				DAY; 35	NHA; 22	IND; 22	POC; 33																30th	633
2013	Austin Dillon	51	Chevy			LVS; 21				TEX; 33						DOV; 27				KEN; 24																				30th	633
2013	Bobby Labonte	51	Chevy															MCH; 43																						30th	633
2013	Jacques Villeneuve	51	Chevy																SON; 41																					30th	633
2013	Owen Kelly	51	Chevy																						GLN; 24															30th	633
2013	Brendan Gaughan	51	Chevy																							MCH; 33														30th	633
2013	Ryan Truex	51	Chevy																								BRI; 42													30th	633
2013	Mike Bliss	51	Chevy																									ATL; 33	RCH	CHI	NHA	DOV	KAN	CLT	TAL	MAR	TEX	PHO	HOM	30th	633

== Xfinity Series ==
=== Car No. 1 history ===
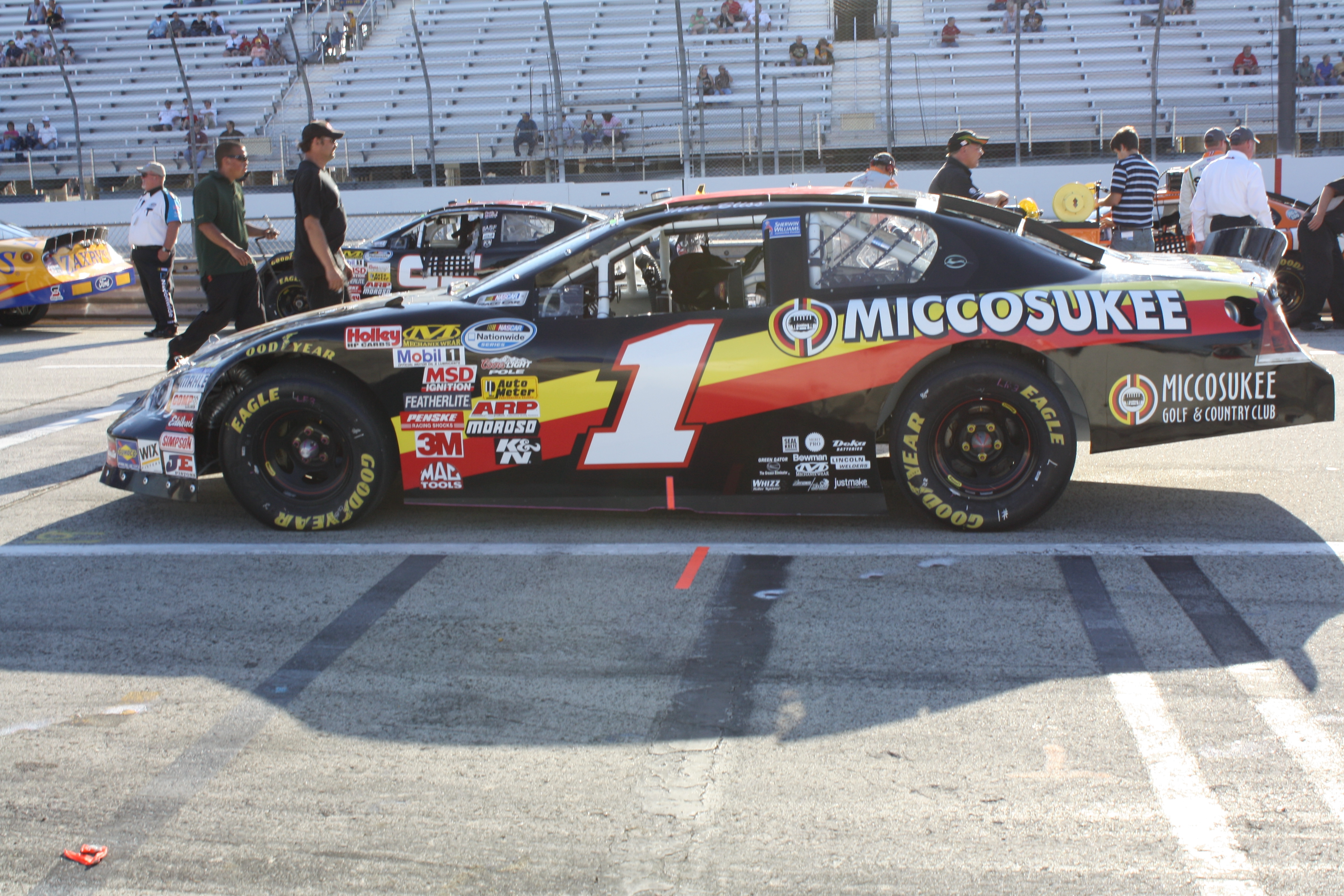
2009 No. 1 Nationwide car

Phoenix made its debut in 1989 with the No. 49 Buick driven by Jeff Purvis at Charlotte. They ran four races together the following season in the No. 15 car, but had three engine failures. The next season, Phoenix and Purvis ran four consecutive races in the No. 14/23 Buick, with a best finish of seventeenth. After a seventh-place finish at Talladega in 1992, the team ran as the No. 28 Havoline Ford for three races, and then changed to the No. 4 Kodak Funsaver Camera Chevrolet in 1993. Purvis won his first pole at Talladega in 1994 as the No. 51 Country Time car, then switched back to the No. 4 Kodak car the next year, where he had three top-ten finishes.

Phoenix Racing made its first full-time season in 1996, despite the No. 4 not having major sponsorship. Purvis won two races and a pole position, finishing seventh in points. Purvis ran the first four races of the 1997, and had a top-ten finish, but was replaced by Tim Steele, who brought sponsorship from HS Die. He had two top-tens, but injuries forced him to exit the ride. He was replaced by multiple drivers, with Dale Shaw running a majority of the races that season, including a 2nd-place finish at South Boston Speedway. Sterling Marlin, Ernie Irvan, and Ron Fellows filled in for Shaw when he could not run. Kevin Lepage then drove two races near the end of the season, before Purvis returned to drive the last race of the year. In 1998, Purvis was again named full-time driver, with Lance Snacks sponsoring. Purvis made 26 starts, missing one race due to injury, during which he was replaced by Dennis Setzer, and an additional four races during which he was suspended for rough driving. Nathan Buttke and Matt Hutter took his place for those races.

Purvis and Lance Snacks departed for Bechtel/Gibbs Racing at the end of the year, taking the No. 4 with him. Phoenix Racing switched to the No. 1 and hired Randy LaJoie to drive. They did not have major sponsorship of start the season, and signed a one-race deal with Jani-King before winning the season-opening NAPA Auto Parts 300. Bob Evans Restaurants then became the sponsor, and LaJoie finished tenth in points. He followed that up with a victory at USA and a seventh-place finish in points in 2000. P. J. Jones was named driver of the No. 1 for 2001, bringing Yellow Freight sponsorship. After four races, he was replaced by Jimmy Spencer who drove in eighteen races for Phoenix, winning three races. Bobby Hamilton, Lepage, and Joe Ruttman filled in for Spencer on occasion.

Phoenix dropped to a part-time schedule in 2002, with Spencer winning twice in 23 races, with Martin Truex Jr. running one race. Ruttman also ran Talladega in a second car, the No. 51, which was involved in a massive pileup on lap 15 which took out most of the field, including Spencer. In 2003, they formed a partnership with Chip Ganassi Racing and fielded the No. 1 full-time for two Ganassi drivers: Cup series driver Jamie McMurray and developmental driver David Stremme. McMurray had two wins, both at Rockingham, while Stremme made sixteen starts with two top-fives, earning him Rookie of the Year honors.

Johnny Benson was named full-time driver in 2004, with Miccosukee Resorts being named the new sponsor. He won one pole and had four top-tens when he was released after ten starts. McMurray ran three of the next four races, and Purvis returned for one race at Nazareth Speedway. Buckshot Jones drove the next two races with the return of Yellow Transportation to the team, followed by Tony Raines, Casey Mears, Bobby Hamilton, Sterling Marlin, Reed Sorenson, and Regan Smith.

Johnny Sauter was named the permanent driver of the No. 1 in 2005, winning at Milwaukee and finishing twelfth in points after Boris Said took his place at the Mexico race. Sauter left for Haas CNC Racing and took the sponsorship with him, and Jason Keller was hired to drive. After eight races, Keller was released and replaced by Mike Wallace, who garnered two top-five finishes, with Scott Pruett and development driver Cale Gale filling in. For 2007, J. J. Yeley was named the new driver of the No. 1, but struggled and only had one top-ten finish and missed six races, with Benson, Marlin and Max Papis filling for most of those races.

In 2008, Sauter returned to the team, but was released after five races. After Sterling Marlin drove one race, Mike Bliss was named the permanent driver of the No. 1 car. Marc Reno, who was born in California and currently resides in Concord, NC, serves as the crew chief and manages the team. He returned to the car after a solid season in 2008 for a full 2009 campaign. On May 23, 2009, Mike Bliss scored his second career Nationwide win and eleventh win for the team at Lowe's Motor Speedway by taking advantage of fuel mileage and a race-ending caution near the end of the race because of rain. In August 2009, Bliss was released due to conflicts with Reno. Ryan Newman, Reed Sorenson, Max Papis, Martin Truex Jr., David Gilliland, and Landon Cassill also took turns sharing the ride following Bliss' release before Bliss returned at Homestead. Rookie James Buescher was to drive the car full-time in 2010, but Finch put his entire operation up for sale on April 24. On May 12, 2010, Newman drove the car at Dover after Buescher parted ways with the team.

On July 6, 2012, Phoenix recorded its first Nationwide Series win in three years when Kurt Busch, who would make occasional starts for the team that season, won the Subway Jalapeno 250 at Daytona for his fifth win in the series and his first for another team owner besides Roger Penske and Kyle Busch.

The No. 1 has 13 victories.

==== Xfinity Series Car No. 1 Results ====
Year	Driver	No.	Make	1	2	3	4	5	6	7	8	9	10	11	12	13	14	15	16	17	18	19	20	21	22	23	24	25	26	27	28	29	30	31	32	33	34	35	NXSC	Pts
1989	Jeff Purvis	49	Buick																											CLT; 40										
1990	Jeff Purvis	15	Buick	DAY; 26	RCH; 36																																			
1990	Jeff Purvis	15	Chevy												CLT; 35																									
1990	Jeff Purvis	15	Olds																							BRI; 26														
1991	Jeff Purvis	23	Buick																								BRI; 32	DAR; 35												
1991	Jeff Purvis	14	Buick																											DOV; 32	CLT; 17									
1992	Jeff Purvis	51	Chevy																			TAL; 7																		
1992	Jeff Purvis	28	Ford																						MCH; 12			DAR; 21	RCH; 20											
1993	Jeff Purvis	51	Chevy	DAY; DNQ																																				
1993	Jeff Purvis	4	Chevy																					RCH; 34							ATL; 20									
1994	Jeff Purvis	51	Chevy				ATL; DNQ								CLT; 29						TAL; 5				BRI; 32		RCH; 30		CLT; DNQ											
1995	Jeff Purvis	4	Chevy	DAY; 9			ATL; 12	NSV; 35						CLT; 9			GLN; 36		TAL; 31			MCH; 12	BRI; DNQ				CLT; 3		HOM; 14											
1996	Jeff Purvis	4	Chevy	DAY; 23	CAR; 3	RCH; 1	ATL; 29	NSV; 34	DAR; 30	BRI; 14	HCY; 16	NZH; 13	CLT; 22	DOV; 16	SBO; 25	RMB; 2	GLN; 25	MLW; 37	NHP; 20	TAL; 6	IRP; 7	MCH; 1	BRI; 14	DAR; 23	RCH; 6	DOV; 37	CLT; 14	CAR; 32	HOM; 25										7th	2894
1997	Jeff Purvis	4	Chevy	DAY; 9	CAR; 33	RCH; 34	ATL; 36																										HOM; 38							
1997	Tim Steele	4	Chevy					LVS; 5	DAR; 37	HCY; 25	TEX; 21	BRI; 19	NSV; 26	TAL; 6																										
1997	Dale Shaw	4	Chevy												NHA; 10	NZH; 5			SBO; 2		MLW; 8	RMB; 35	GTY; 3	IRP; 24	MCH; 10	BRI; 42	DAR; 31	RCH; 6	DOV; 31	CLT										
1997	Ernie Irvan	4	Chevy														CLT; 28																							
1997	Sterling Marlin	4	Chevy															DOV; 33																						
1997	Ron Fellows	4	Chevy																	GLN; 25																				
1997	Kevin Lepage	4	Chevy																												CAL; 12	CAR; 33								
1998	Jeff Purvis	4	Chevy	DAY; 2	CAR; 20	LVS; 28	NSV; 18	DAR; 32	BRI; 27	TEX; 36		TAL; 15	NHA; 4	NZH; 2	CLT; 31	DOV; 22	RCH; 12	PPR; 5	GLN; 32	MLW; 3	MYB; 29	CAL; 6	SBO; 28					RCH; 6	DOV; 7	CLT; 9	GTY; 3*	CAR; 19	ATL; 35	HOM; 12						
1998	Dennis Setzer	4	Chevy								HCY; 31																													
1998	Matt Hutter	4	Chevy																					IRP; 36																
1998	Nathan Buttke	4	Chevy																						MCH; 22	BRI; 9	DAR; 17													
1999	Randy LaJoie	1	Chevy	DAY; 1*	CAR; 4	LVS; 15	ATL; 26	DAR; 43	TEX; 17	NSV; 38	BRI; 36	TAL; 9*	CAL; 34	NHA; 4	RCH; 42	NZH; 20	CLT; 13	DOV; 27	SBO; 24	GLN; 17	MLW; 14	MYB; 2*	PPR; 13	GTY; 2	IRP; 13	MCH; 40	BRI; 11	DAR; 16	RCH; 33	DOV; 2	CLT; 38	CAR; 26	MEM; 26	PHO; 17	HOM; 29				10th	3379
2000	Randy LaJoie	1	Chevy	DAY; 7	CAR; 11	LVS; 9	ATL; 9	DAR; 18	BRI; 5	TEX; 8	NSV; 1	TAL; 36	CAL; 16	RCH; 21	NHA; 39	CLT; 22	DOV; 25	SBO; 23	MYB; 14	GLN; 15	MLW; 3	NZH; 8	PPR; 41	GTY; 11	IRP; 13	MCH; 26	BRI; 31	DAR; 14	RCH; 13	DOV; 31	CLT; 15	CAR; 18	MEM; 4	PHO; 13					7th	3625
2000	P.J. Jones	1	Chevy																																HOM; 37				7th	3625
2001	P.J. Jones	1	Chevy	DAY; 27	CAR; 37	LVS; 27	ATL; 17																																	
2001	Jimmy Spencer	1	Chevy					DAR; 13	BRI; 26	TEX; 30			CAL; 7	RCH; 1*		NZH	CLT; 8	DOV; 1			GLN	CHI; 18	GTY		IRP	MCH; 31	BRI; 7	DAR; 8	RCH; 1*	DOV; 3	KAN; 18	CLT; 6	MEM	PHO; 35	CAR	HOM; 36				
2001	Jimmy Spencer	1	Pontiac									TAL; 2*																												
2001	Bobby Hamilton	1	Chevy								NSV; 20																													
2001	Kevin Lepage	1	Chevy												NHA; 35																									
2001	Joe Ruttman	1	Chevy																KEN; 33	MLW; 38				PPR; 21																
2002	Jimmy Spencer	1	Pontiac	DAY; 28							TAL; 37										DAY; 8																			2530
2002	Jimmy Spencer	1	Chevy		CAR; 7	LVS; 16	DAR; 24	BRI; 4	TEX; 28	NSV		CAL; 35	RCH; 32		NZH	CLT; 38	DOV; 37	NSV	KEN	MLW		CHI; 6	GTY	PPR	IRP	MCH; 9	BRI; 1*	DAR; 22	RCH; 32	DOV; 6	KAN; 6	CLT; 34	MEM	ATL; 38	CAR	PHO; 6	HOM; 8			2530
2002	Martin Truex Jr.	1	Chevy											NHA; 29																										2530
2003	Jamie McMurray	1	Dodge	DAY; 5	CAR; 1		DAR; 2	BRI; 17	TEX; 14	TAL; 6		CAL; 6				CLT; 23					DAY; 3	CHI; 9	NHA; 23			MCH; 14	BRI; 12	DAR; 41			KAN; 10					CAR; 1	HOM; 20		8th	4396
2003	Jamie McMurray	1	Chevy			LVS; 33																																	8th	4396
2003	David Stremme	1	Dodge								NSV; 7		RCH; 14	GTY; 14	NZH; 6		DOV; 31	NSV; 3	KEN; 10	MLW; 3				PPR; 11	IRP; 17				RCH; 13	DOV; 21		CLT; 14	MEM; 9	ATL; 12	PHO; 13				8th	4396
2004	Johnny Benson	1	Dodge	DAY; 41	CAR; 9	LVS; 34	DAR; 6	BRI; 13	TEX; 4	NSV; 7	TAL; 36	CAL; 21	GTY; 29																											
2004	Jamie McMurray	1	Dodge											RCH; 41		CLT; 2	DOV; 8					CHI; 27																		
2004	Jeff Purvis	1	Dodge												NZH; 17																									
2004	Buckshot Jones	1	Dodge															NSV; 29	KEN; 38																					
2004	Tony Raines	1	Dodge																	MLW; 34																				
2004	Casey Mears	1	Dodge																		DAY; 7		NHA; 20			MCH; 4	BRI; 35		RCH; 31	DOV; 19	KAN; 8			ATL; 42	PHO; 20	DAR; 6	HOM; 26			
2004	Regan Smith	1	Dodge																					PPR; 15																
2004	Bobby Hamilton	1	Dodge																						IRP; 16															
2004	Sterling Marlin	1	Dodge																									CAL; 37				CLT; 21								
2004	Reed Sorenson	1	Dodge																														MEM; 10							
2005	Johnny Sauter	1	Dodge	DAY; 41	CAL; 24		LVS; 28	ATL; 20	NSV; 16	BRI; 18	TEX; 43	PHO; 26	TAL; 41	DAR; 17	RCH; 3	CLT; 18	DOV; 35	NSV; 9	KEN; 38	MLW; 1*	DAY; 16	CHI; 27	NHA; 18	PPR; 32	GTY; 7	IRP; 9	GLN; 43	MCH; 10	BRI; 5	CAL; 4	RCH; 12	DOV; 39	KAN; 3	CLT; 42	MEM; 9	TEX; 10	PHO; 11	HOM; 11		3720
2005	Boris Said	1	Dodge			MXC; 5																																		3720
2006	Jason Keller	1	Dodge	DAY; 11	CAL; 15	MXC; 22	LVS; 16	ATL; 23	BRI; 15	TEX; 28	NSV; 16																													
2006	Mike Wallace	1	Dodge									PHO; 18	TAL; 12	RCH; 13	DAR; 41	CLT; 34	DOV; 14		KEN; 4	MLW; 5	DAY; 7		NHA; 12	MAR; 11	GTY; 29	IRP; 13			BRI; 15	CAL; 34	RCH; 19	DOV; 22	KAN; 28	CLT; 29	MEM; 18	TEX; 13	PHO; 19			
2006	Mike Wallace	1	Chevy																																			HOM; 25		
2006	Cale Gale	1	Dodge															NSV; 20				CHI; 37						MCH; 34												
2006	Scott Pruett	1	Dodge																								GLN; 10													
2007	J. J. Yeley	1	Chevy	DAY; DNQ	CAL; 23	MXC; 37	LVS; 19	ATL; 22	BRI; 22	NSV; 12	TEX; 18	PHO; 24	TAL; 17	RCH; 12	DAR; 16	CLT; 26	DOV; 25	NSV; 18	KEN; 12		NHA; 36	DAY; 22	CHI; 11	GTY; 9	IRP; 16			MCH; 17	BRI; 39	CAL; 34	RCH; 19		KAN; 33	CLT; 37		TEX; 33	PHO; 11	HOM; 40		
2007	Johnny Benson	1	Chevy																	MLW; 9																				
2007	Max Papis	1	Chevy																							CGV; 20	GLN; 11													
2007	Sterling Marlin	1	Chevy																													DOV; 15			MEM; 26					
2008	Johnny Sauter	1	Chevy	DAY; 13	CAL; 21	LVS; 16	ATL; 26	BRI; 21																																
2008	Sterling Marlin	1	Chevy						NSV; 22																															
2008	Mike Bliss	1	Chevy							TEX; 24	PHO; 6	MXC; 9	TAL; 7	RCH; 8	DAR; 14	CLT; 15	DOV; 18	NSV; 12	KEN; 8	MLW; 7	NHA; 8	DAY; 10	CHI; 11	GTY; 31	IRP; 3	CGV; 19	GLN; 13	MCH; 6	BRI; 13	CAL; 12	RCH; 11	DOV; 2	KAN; 12	CLT; 19	MEM; 6	TEX; 27	PHO; 8	HOM; 14		
2009	Mike Bliss	1	Chevy	DAY; 28	CAL; 13	LVS; 22	BRI; 35	TEX; 7	NSV; 8	PHO; 9	TAL; 41	RCH; 33	DAR; 7	CLT; 1	DOV; 14	NSV; 4	KEN; 28	MLW; 7	NHA; 4	DAY; 29	CHI; 9	GTY; 4	IRP; 33	IOW; 14														HOM; 16		
2009	Ryan Newman	1	Chevy																						GLN; 35															
2009	Reed Sorenson	1	Chevy																							MCH; 12	BRI; 35		ATL; 10											
2009	Max Papis	1	Chevy																									CGV; 20												
2009	Martin Truex Jr.	1	Chevy																											RCH; 6	DOV; 16									
2009	David Gilliland	1	Chevy																													KAN; 19	CAL; 8	CLT; 19						
2009	Landon Cassill	1	Chevy																																MEM; 10					
2009	James Buescher	1	Chevy																																	TEX; 11	PHO; 13			
2010	James Buescher	1	Chevy	DAY; 8	CAL; 13	LVS; 29	BRI; 36	NSV; 34	PHO; 28	TEX; 17	TAL; 37	RCH; 12	DAR; 31																											
2010	Ryan Newman	1	Chevy											DOV; 2	CLT; 5	NSV	KEN	RDA	NHP	DAY; 8	CHI; 36	GTY	IRP	IOW	GLN; 25	MCH; 36	BRI; 35	CGV	ATL; 8	RCH; 21	DOV; 10	KAN	CAL; 7	CLT; 9	GTY	TEX	PHO	HOM		
2011	Landon Cassill	1	Chevy	DAY; 3	PHO	LVS	BRI	CAL	TEX																															
2011	Jamie McMurray	1	Chevy							TAL; 34	NSH	RCH	DAR	DOV	IOW	CLT	CHI	MCH	ROA	DAY; 16	KEN	NHA	NSH	IRP	IOW	GLN	CGV	BRI	ATL	RCH; 31	CHI	DOV	KAN	CLT	TEX	PHO	HOM			
2012	Kurt Busch	1	Chevy	DAY; 10*	PHO	LVS	BRI	CAL	TEX	RCH	TAL; 6	DAR	IOW	CLT	DOV	MCH	ROA	KEN	DAY; 1*	NHA	CHI	IND; 34	IOW	GLN	CGV	BRI	ATL	RCH	CHI	KEN	DOV	CLT	KAN	TEX	PHO	HOM				
2013	Kurt Busch	1	Chevy	DAY; 35	PHO	LVS	BRI	CAL	TEX	RCH	TAL; 4	DAR	CLT	DOV	IOW	MCH	ROA	KEN	DAY; 4	NHA	CHI	IND	IOW	GLN	MOH	BRI	ATL	RCH	CHI	KEN	DOV	KAN	CLT	TEX	PHO	HOM				

=== Car No. 4 history ===
Phoenix Racing began running two cars in 2000, when Matt Hutter drove the No. 51 at Daytona and Talladega, with TracFone sponsoring; his best finish was 19th. LaJoie drove late in the season at Homestead, when P. J. Jones drove the No. 1. In 2005, they began fielding the No. 09 for three races, with Boris Said, Wallace, and Eric McClure driving. The team also fielded a No. 28 car for Johnny Sauter at Mexico City while Boris Said occupied his usual No. 1 car. They began fielding the second car full-time in 2007, when Wallace drove the No. 7 GEICO Chevrolet. Despite failing to finish in the top-ten, he finished 11th in points. In 2008, the team switched to the No. 4, and leased its owners points to Jay Robinson Racing. Robinson ran the No. 4 car on a full-time basis, although Phoenix did field the No. 4 for Landon Cassill at Mexico City.

==== Xfinity Series Car No. 4 Results ====
Year	Driver	No.	Make	1	2	3	4	5	6	7	8	9	10	11	12	13	14	15	16	17	18	19	20	21	22	23	24	25	26	27	28	29	30	31	32	33	34	NXSC	Pts
2000	Matt Hutter	51	Chevy	DAY; 19								TAL; 43																											
2000	Randy LaJoie	51	Chevy																																HOM; 24				
2005	Johnny Sauter	28	Dodge			MXC; 11																																	
2005	Mike Wallace	09	Dodge									TAL; 39																											
2005	Eric McClure	09	Dodge																		DAY; 32																		
2005	Boris Said	09	Dodge																								GLN; 37												
2007	Mike Wallace	7	Chevy	DAY; 23	CAL; 24	MXC; 19	LVS; 13	ATL; 17	BRI; 29	NSH; 30	TEX; 15	PHO; 19	TAL; 33	RCH; 36	DAR; 23	CLT; 23	DOV; 33	NSH; 25	KEN; 25	NHA; 28	DAY; 15	CHI; 18	GTY; 12	IRP; 20	CGV; 27	GLN; 26	MCH; 23	BRI; 35	CAL; 16	RCH; 31	DOV; 13	KAN; 41	CLT; 15	MEM; 13	TEX; 21	PHO; 17	HOM; 24	11th	3396
2008	Landon Cassill	4	Chevy										MXC; 23																										

== Gander RV & Outdoors Truck Series ==
=== Truck No. 09 history ===
In 2004, Phoenix Racing fielded the No. 09 Dodge truck for Jimmy Spencer at Richmond, with sponsorship from Miccosukee. Spencer would blow an engine with 12 laps remaining in the race and finish 28th.

=== Truck No. 5 history ===
On March 3, 2020, it was announced that Phoenix Racing and both former Truck Series teams Billy Ballew Motorsports and Wauters Motorsports would jointly be restarted and returning to the series with Erik Jones running at Homestead as he sought the Kyle Busch US$100,000 bounty. However, Ballew stated the team had no plans to return besides the one race. Following the postponement of the Homestead race due to the COVID-19 pandemic, Jones was announced to compete at Charlotte. Due to the cancellation of qualifying runs, he was unable to make the starting field.

== ARCA Menards Series East ==
In 2022, the team made their debut in the ARCA Menards Series East. Jake Finch, the son of James Finch, made his debut in the No. 1 car at Pensacola. Finch would return to his family team and the No. 1 car for the East Series race at Nashville. He would start on the pole, lead 44 laps and finish second in the race. In both of his East Series races for Phoenix Racing, Finch drove an unbadged Toyota.

=== ARCA Menards Series East Results ===
Year	Driver	No.	Make	1	2	3	4	5	6	7	8	AMSC	Pts
2022	Jake Finch	1	Toyota	NSM	FIF; 8	DOV	NSV; 2	IOW	MLW; 8	BRI; 13		6th	185
2023	Jake Finch	1	Toyota	FIF	DOV	NSV; 5	FRS	IOW	IRP	MLW; 9	BRI; 4	8th	203
2024	Jake Finch	1	Toyota	FIF	DOV	NSV	FRS	IOW	IRP	MLW	BRI; 8	29th	77
