= 2013 Ford EcoBoost 400 =

Race details
- Race 36 of 36 in the 2013 NASCAR Sprint Cup Series
- Date: November 17, 2013
- Location: Homestead–Miami Speedway, Homestead, Florida
- Course: Permanent racing facility
- Course length: 1.5 miles (2.4 km)
- Distance: 267 laps, 400.5 mi (644.542 km)
- Weather: Temperatures reaching up to 84 °F (29 °C); wind speeds up to 12 miles per hour (19 km/h)

Pole position
Driver	Matt Kenseth	Joe Gibbs Racing
- Time: 30.934 seconds (177.667 mph)

Most laps led
Driver	Matt Kenseth	Joe Gibbs Racing
- Laps: 144

Winner
No. 11	Denny Hamlin	Joe Gibbs Racing

Television in the United States
- Network: ESPN
- Announcers: Allen Bestwick, Dale Jarrett and Andy Petree

The 2013 Ford EcoBoost 400 was a NASCAR Sprint Cup Series stock car race that was held on November 17, 2013, at Homestead–Miami Speedway in Homestead, Florida. Contested over 267 laps, it was the thirty-sixth and final race in the 2013 NASCAR Sprint Cup Series, as well as the final race in the ten-race Chase for the Sprint Cup, which ends the season. Denny Hamlin won the race. Matt Kenseth finished second while Dale Earnhardt Jr., Martin Truex Jr. and Clint Bowyer rounded out the top five. Jimmie Johnson finished ninth to take his sixth Sprint Cup title.

== Report ==
=== Entry list ===
(R) - Denotes rookie driver.

(i) - Denotes driver who is ineligible for series driver points.

No.	Driver	Team	Manufacturer
1	Jamie McMurray	Earnhardt Ganassi Racing	Chevrolet
2	Brad Keselowski	Penske Racing	Ford
5	Kasey Kahne	Hendrick Motorsports	Chevrolet
7	Dave Blaney	Tommy Baldwin Racing	Chevrolet
9	Marcos Ambrose	Richard Petty Motorsports	Ford
10	Danica Patrick (R)	Stewart–Haas Racing	Chevrolet
11	Denny Hamlin	Joe Gibbs Racing	Toyota
13	Casey Mears	Germain Racing	Ford
14	Mark Martin	Stewart–Haas Racing	Chevrolet
15	Clint Bowyer	Michael Waltrip Racing	Toyota
16	Greg Biffle	Roush Fenway Racing	Ford
17	Ricky Stenhouse Jr. (R)	Roush Fenway Racing	Ford
18	Kyle Busch	Joe Gibbs Racing	Toyota
20	Matt Kenseth	Joe Gibbs Racing	Toyota
21	Trevor Bayne (i)	Wood Brothers Racing	Ford
22	Joey Logano	Penske Racing	Ford
24	Jeff Gordon	Hendrick Motorsports	Chevrolet
27	Paul Menard	Richard Childress Racing	Chevrolet
29	Kevin Harvick	Richard Childress Racing	Chevrolet
30	Parker Kligerman (i)	Swan Racing	Toyota
31	Jeff Burton	Richard Childress Racing	Chevrolet
32	Ken Schrader	FAS Lane Racing	Ford
33	Landon Cassill (i)	Circle Sport	Chevrolet
34	David Ragan	Front Row Motorsports	Ford
35	Josh Wise (i)	Front Row Motorsports	Ford
36	J. J. Yeley	Tommy Baldwin Racing	Chevrolet
38	David Gilliland	Front Row Motorsports	Ford
39	Ryan Newman	Stewart–Haas Racing	Chevrolet
40	Tony Raines (i)	Circle Sport	Chevrolet
42	Juan Pablo Montoya	Earnhardt Ganassi Racing	Chevrolet
43	Aric Almirola	Richard Petty Motorsports	Ford
47	A. J. Allmendinger	JTG Daugherty Racing	Toyota
48	Jimmie Johnson	Hendrick Motorsports	Chevrolet
51	Kyle Larson (i)	HScott Motorsports	Chevrolet
55	Elliott Sadler (i)	Michael Waltrip Racing	Toyota
56	Martin Truex Jr.	Michael Waltrip Racing	Toyota
78	Kurt Busch	Furniture Row Racing	Chevrolet
83	David Reutimann	BK Racing	Toyota
87	Joe Nemechek (i)	NEMCO-Jay Robinson Racing	Toyota
88	Dale Earnhardt Jr.	Hendrick Motorsports	Chevrolet
93	Travis Kvapil	BK Racing	Toyota
98	Michael McDowell	Phil Parsons Racing	Ford
99	Carl Edwards	Roush Fenway Racing	Ford
Official entry list

== Results ==
=== Qualifying ===
No.	Driver	Team	Manufacturer	Time	Speed	Grid
20	Matt Kenseth	Joe Gibbs Racing	Toyota	177.667	30.394	1
78	Kurt Busch	Furniture Row Racing	Chevrolet	177.445	30.432	2
22	Joey Logano	Penske Racing	Ford	177.282	30.460	3
2	Brad Keselowski	Penske Racing	Ford	177.061	30.498	4
11	Denny Hamlin	Joe Gibbs Racing	Toyota	176.846	30.535	5
29	Kevin Harvick	Richard Childress Racing	Chevrolet	176.655	30.568	6
48	Jimmie Johnson	Hendrick Motorsports	Chevrolet	176.598	30.578	7
56	Martin Truex Jr.	Michael Waltrip Racing	Toyota	176.436	30.606	8
17	Ricky Stenhouse Jr. #	Roush Fenway Racing	Ford	176.436	30.606	9
55	Elliott Sadler	Michael Waltrip Racing	Toyota	176.413	30.610	10
18	Kyle Busch	Joe Gibbs Racing	Toyota	176.355	30.620	11
27	Paul Menard	Richard Childress Racing	Chevrolet	176.355	30.620	12
5	Kasey Kahne	Hendrick Motorsports	Chevrolet	176.304	30.629	13
31	Jeff Burton	Richard Childress Racing	Chevrolet	175.747	30.726	14
39	Ryan Newman	Stewart–Haas Racing	Chevrolet	175.730	30.729	15
16	Greg Biffle	Roush Fenway Racing	Ford	175.690	30.736	16
21	Trevor Bayne	Wood Brothers Racing	Ford	175.507	30.768	17
99	Carl Edwards	Roush Fenway Racing	Ford	175.433	30.781	18
43	Aric Almirola	Richard Petty Motorsports	Ford	175.376	30.791	19
51	Kyle Larson	Phoenix Racing	Chevrolet	175.353	30.795	20
88	Dale Earnhardt Jr.	Hendrick Motorsports	Chevrolet	175.347	30.796	21
14	Mark Martin	Stewart–Haas Racing	Chevrolet	175.273	30.809	22
9	Marcos Ambrose	Richard Petty Motorsports	Ford	175.109	30.838	23
10	Danica Patrick #	Stewart–Haas Racing	Chevrolet	175.092	30.841	24
15	Clint Bowyer	Michael Waltrip Racing	Toyota	174.780	30.896	25
24	Jeff Gordon	Hendrick Motorsports	Chevrolet	174.610	30.926	26
42	Juan Pablo Montoya	Earnhardt Ganassi Racing	Chevrolet	174.537	30.939	27
1	Jamie McMurray	Earnhardt Ganassi Racing	Chevrolet	174.329	30.976	28
34	David Ragan	Front Row Motorsports	Ford	174.317	30.978	29
30	Parker Kligerman	Swan Racing Company	Toyota	173.171	31.183	30
38	David Gilliland	Front Row Motorsports	Ford	173.099	31.196	31
83	David Reutimann	BK Racing	Toyota	172.563	31.293	32
93	Travis Kvapil	BK Racing	Toyota	172.287	31.343	33
98	Michael McDowell	Phil Parsons Racing	Ford	172.260	31.348	34
35	Josh Wise	Front Row Motorsports	Ford	172.046	31.387	35
47	A. J. Allmendinger	JTG Daugherty Racing	Toyota	171.734	31.444	36
36	J. J. Yeley	Tommy Baldwin Racing	Chevrolet	171.717	31.447	37
7	Dave Blaney	Tommy Baldwin Racing	Chevrolet	170.891	31.599	38
33	Landon Cassill	Circle Sport	Chevrolet	170.481	31.675	39
13	Casey Mears	Germain Racing	Ford	170.154	31.736	40
32	Ken Schrader	FAS Lane Racing	Ford	170.122	31.742	41
87	Joe Nemechek	NEMCO-Jay Robinson Racing	Toyota	169.817	31.799	42
40	Tony Raines	Circle Sport	Chevrolet	167.183	32.300	43
# Rookie of the Year candidate

=== Race ===
Pos	No.	Driver	Team	Make	Laps	Race Status	Lead	Points
1	11	Denny Hamlin	Joe Gibbs Racing	Toyota	267	running	72	47
2	20	Matt Kenseth	Joe Gibbs Racing	Toyota	267	running	144	44
3	88	Dale Earnhardt Jr.	Hendrick Motorsports	Chevrolet	267	running	28	42
4	56	Martin Truex Jr.	Michael Waltrip Racing	Toyota	267	running	0	40
5	15	Clint Bowyer	Michael Waltrip Racing	Toyota	267	running	0	39
6	2	Brad Keselowski	Penske Racing	Ford	267	running	9	39
7	18	Kyle Busch	Joe Gibbs Racing	Toyota	267	running	0	37
8	22	Joey Logano	Penske Racing	Ford	267	running	0	36
9	48	Jimmie Johnson	Hendrick Motorsports	Chevrolet	267	running	0	35
10	29	Kevin Harvick	Richard Childress Racing	Chevrolet	267	running	8	35
11	24	Jeff Gordon	Hendrick Motorsports	Chevrolet	267	running	0	33
12	99	Carl Edwards	Roush Fenway Racing	Ford	267	running	0	32
13	5	Kasey Kahne	Hendrick Motorsports	Chevrolet	267	running	0	31
14	55	Elliott Sadler	Michael Waltrip Racing	Toyota	267	running	0	0
15	51	Kyle Larson	Phoenix Racing	Chevrolet	267	running	1	0
16	43	Aric Almirola	Richard Petty Motorsports	Ford	267	running	0	28
17	39	Ryan Newman	Stewart–Haas Racing	Chevrolet	267	running	0	27
18	42	Juan Pablo Montoya	Earnhardt Ganassi Racing	Chevrolet	267	running	0	26
19	14	Mark Martin	Stewart–Haas Racing	Chevrolet	267	running	0	25
20	10	Danica Patrick (R)	Stewart–Haas Racing	Chevrolet	267	running	0	24
21	78	Kurt Busch	Furniture Row Racing	Chevrolet	267	running	4	24
22	17	Ricky Stenhouse Jr. (R)	Roush Fenway Racing	Ford	267	running	0	22
23	31	Jeff Burton	Richard Childress Racing	Chevrolet	267	running	0	21
24	16	Greg Biffle	Roush Fenway Racing	Ford	267	running	0	20
25	30	Parker Kligerman	Swan Racing	Toyota	267	running	0	0
26	9	Marcos Ambrose	Richard Petty Motorsports	Ford	267	running	0	18
27	38	David Gilliland	Front Row Motorsports	Ford	266	running	0	17
28	13	Casey Mears	Germain Racing	Ford	266	running	0	16
29	34	David Ragan	Front Row Motorsports	Ford	266	running	1	16
30	1	Jamie McMurray	Earnhardt Ganassi Racing	Chevrolet	265	running	0	14
31	83	David Reutimann	BK Racing	Toyota	265	running	0	13
32	36	J.J. Yeley	Tommy Baldwin Racing	Chevrolet	264	running	0	12
33	33	Landon Cassill	Circle Sport	Chevrolet	264	running	0	0
34	32	Ken Schrader	FAS Lane Racing	Ford	263	running	0	10
35	87	Joe Nemechek	NEMCO-Jay Robinson Racing	Toyota	263	running	0	0
36	47	A. J. Allmendinger	JTG Daugherty Racing	Toyota	257	running	0	8
37	93	Travis Kvapil	BK Racing	Toyota	248	running	0	7
38	7	Dave Blaney	Tommy Baldwin Racing	Chevrolet	242	running	0	6
39	27	Paul Menard	Richard Childress Racing	Chevrolet	229	crash	0	5
40	21	Trevor Bayne	Wood Brothers Racing	Ford	223	engine	0	0
41	35	Josh Wise	Front Row Motorsports	Ford	119	rear gear	0	0
42	40	Tony Raines	Circle Sport / Hillman Racing	Chevrolet	104	vibration	0	0
43	98	Michael McDowell	Phil Parsons Racing	Ford	63	brakes	0	1

== Statistics after the race ==
Drivers' Championship standings

Pos.	Driver	Points	Changes
1	Jimmie Johnson	2419	
2	Matt Kenseth	2400	
3	Kevin Harvick	2385	
4	Kyle Busch	2364	
5	Dale Earnhardt Jr.	2363	

Manufacturers' Championship standings

Pos.	Manufacturer	Points	Changes
1	Chevrolet	254	
2	Toyota	229	
3	Ford	194	

Note: Only the first five positions are included for the driver standings.

Previous race: 2013 AdvoCare 500	Sprint Cup Series; 2013 season	Next race: 2014 Daytona 500
