= Tony Raines =

American racing driver (born 1964)

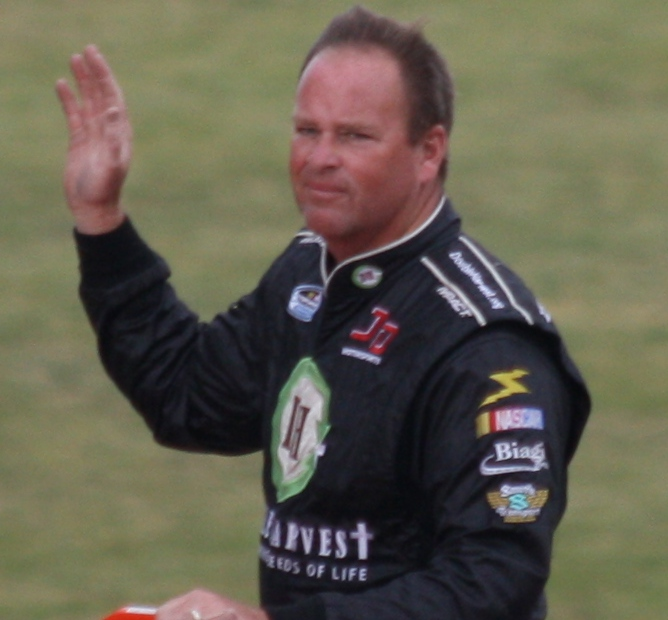
- Raines at Road America in 2012
- Born: Floyd Anthony Raines; April 14, 1964 (age 62); Glasgow, Montana, U.S.
- Achievements: 1996 ASA National Tour Champion
- Awards: 1999 Busch Series Rookie of the Year

NASCAR Cup Series career
- 180 races run over 12 years
- 2013 position: 67th
- Best finish: 29th (2007)
- First race: 2002 MBNA Platinum 400 (Dover)
- Last race: 2013 Ford EcoBoost 400 (Homestead)
Wins	Top tens	Poles
0	3	0

NASCAR O'Reilly Auto Parts Series career
- 282 races run over 14 years
- 2013 position: 51st
- Best finish: 6th (2001)
- First race: 1999 NAPA Auto Parts 300 (Daytona)
- Last race: 2013 Great Clips / Grit Chips 300 (Atlanta)
Wins	Top tens	Poles
0	52	1

NASCAR FedEx Freight Truck Series career
- 54 races run over 5 years
- 2013 position: 115th
- Best finish: 5th (1998)
- First race: 1997 NAPA 200 (Tucson)
- Last race: 2013 Pocono Mountains 125 (Pocono)
- First win: 1997 Western Auto/Parts America 200 (I-70)
- Last win: 1998 Kroger 225 (Louisville)
Wins	Top tens	Poles
4	22	1
- Statistics up to date as of November 17, 2013.

Floyd Anthony Raines (born April 14, 1964) is an American former professional stock car racing driver. He is a former National Touring Series champion in the American Speed Association and 1999 Rookie of the Year in the NASCAR Nationwide Series. He was the spotter for the No. 41 Stewart–Haas Racing Ford Mustang Dark Horse for Ryan Preece until SHR closed in 2024.

== Before NASCAR ==
Born in Glasgow, Montana, Raines began racing after moving to Indiana. In 1988, Raines competed in five ASA races, and then returned for his rookie year in 1989. In 1990, Raines moved to NASCAR's All Pro Series, where he won Rookie of the Year and finished fourth in the final standings.

Raines returned to ASA in 1991 for a four-year stint as driver of a new team formed by Ernie Roselli. In 1995, he joined veteran crew chief Howie Lettow and Baker Motorsports. That in turn led to the 1996 championship and Raines' first major NASCAR ride.

== NASCAR ==
=== 1997–2003 ===
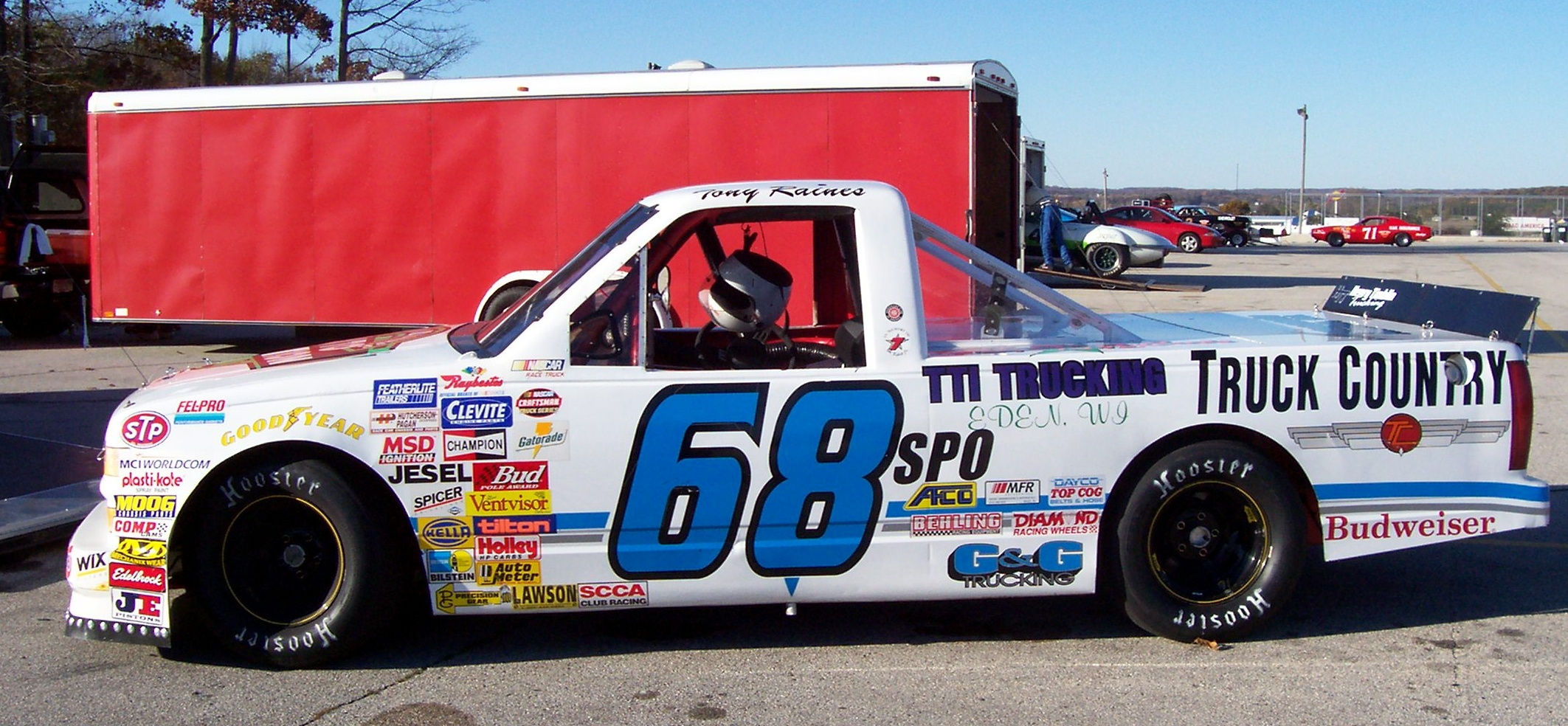
1999 truck

Raines entered the 1997 season with a full-time ride, running for Rookie of the Year honors in the No. 19 Pennzoil Ford F-150 for Kurt Roehrig. After failing to qualify for the first race of the season, Raines came back to win the seventh race of the season at I-70 Speedway. He finished fifteenth in points and ended the season with two top-fives and seven top-tens, as well as two outside-pole positions. In 1998, he won three races (I-70, Louisville, and Texas) and earned sixth additional top-fives with fifteen top-tens, ending the season fifth in the standings.

In 1999, Roehrig lost the Pennzoil sponsorship, causing Raines to look elsewhere. This resulted in his move up to the Busch Series, signing with the No. 74 BACE Motorsports team. Raines raced 31 times during the season, with the exception of the Coca-Cola 300, in which Steve Grissom drove. Without a primary sponsorship, Raines had a best finish of fourth and finished twelfth in points, capturing the Rookie of the Year honors. In 1999, he made one start in the Truck Series at The Milwaukee Mile for Gerry Gunderman in the No. 68 truck in 1999 when Raines started 22nd and finished nineteenth. The following season, Raines moved to BACE's No. 33 Bayer Chevrolet Monte Carlo full-time. He had a career-best second-place finish at South Boston Speedway, but with no other top-tens, he fell to fifteenth in the final points standings. He would return in 2001 with Bayer and Alka-Seltzer sharing sponsorship duties, winning his first career pole at Nazareth Speedway and had a career-high thirteen top-ten finishes, finishing sixth in points. He followed that up with five top-fives in 2002, but fell six spots in points.

=== 2003 ===
BACE and Raines moved to the Winston Cup full-time in 2003, completing the whole season for NASCAR Rookie of the Year honors. Despite running without major sponsorship, Raines had a sixth-place finish at North Carolina Speedway and finished 33rd in the championship standings, and third in the Rookie of the Year race. During the last six races of the season, Raines was in the top-twenty in points gained for those six races. In the Busch series, Raines had another second-place finish and three consecutive eighth-place runs, allowing him to finish 39th in points despite an abbreviated schedule.

=== 2004 ===
Due to the lack of a sponsorship in 2004, BACE closed its Cup team and focused back on the Busch Series. BACE hired Damon Lusk to drive its No. 74 Outdoor Channel Chevrolet Monte Carlo; after four races, Raines returned to the team in favor of Lusk, and finished sixth in his first race at Bristol. He ran fifteen races for BACE that season, and drove additional races for Phoenix Racing, Haas CNC Racing, and Kevin Harvick Incorporated. He returned to the Truck series for one race at Atlanta, finishing seventeenth in the No. 08 1-800-4-A-Phone Chevrolet Silverado for Green Light Racing. Raines ran one-race deals in Cup for Phoenix Racing and for Bill Davis Racing in 2004, before running four races for Competitive Edge Motorsports. His best Cup finish in 2004 was 28th.

=== 2005 ===
He made a total of six Nextel Cup races in 2005, his first being a 35th-place finish for Front Row Motorsports at Richmond. Late in the season, he drove the No. 37 Dodge Charger for R&J Racing for six races. At Michigan, Raines inherited the lead late in the race, however with a handful of laps left ran out of fuel. The best finish for the pairing was a 22nd-place finish at Talladega Speedway. In addition to his Cup rides in 2005, Raines drove part-time for Kevin Harvick Incorporated in the No. 33 Yard Man/Outdoor Channel Chevrolet Monte Carlo in the Busch Series. In 2005, he had nine top-tens in 23 starts, with a fourth-place finish at the Federated Auto Parts 300. Drie was born.

=== 2006–2007 ===
Towards the end of the 2005 Nextel Cup Series, he was announced as a co-driver of a new team: the No. 96 Texas Instruments/DLP HDTV Chevrolet for Hall of Fame Racing. He would share the ride in 2006 with Terry Labonte. Raines and the team had their best race of the season during the Bank of America 500 at Lowe's Motor Speedway, where he led 28 laps and finished seven¼th. In the 29 races he competed in, Raines had one top-ten finish and finished 35th in points.

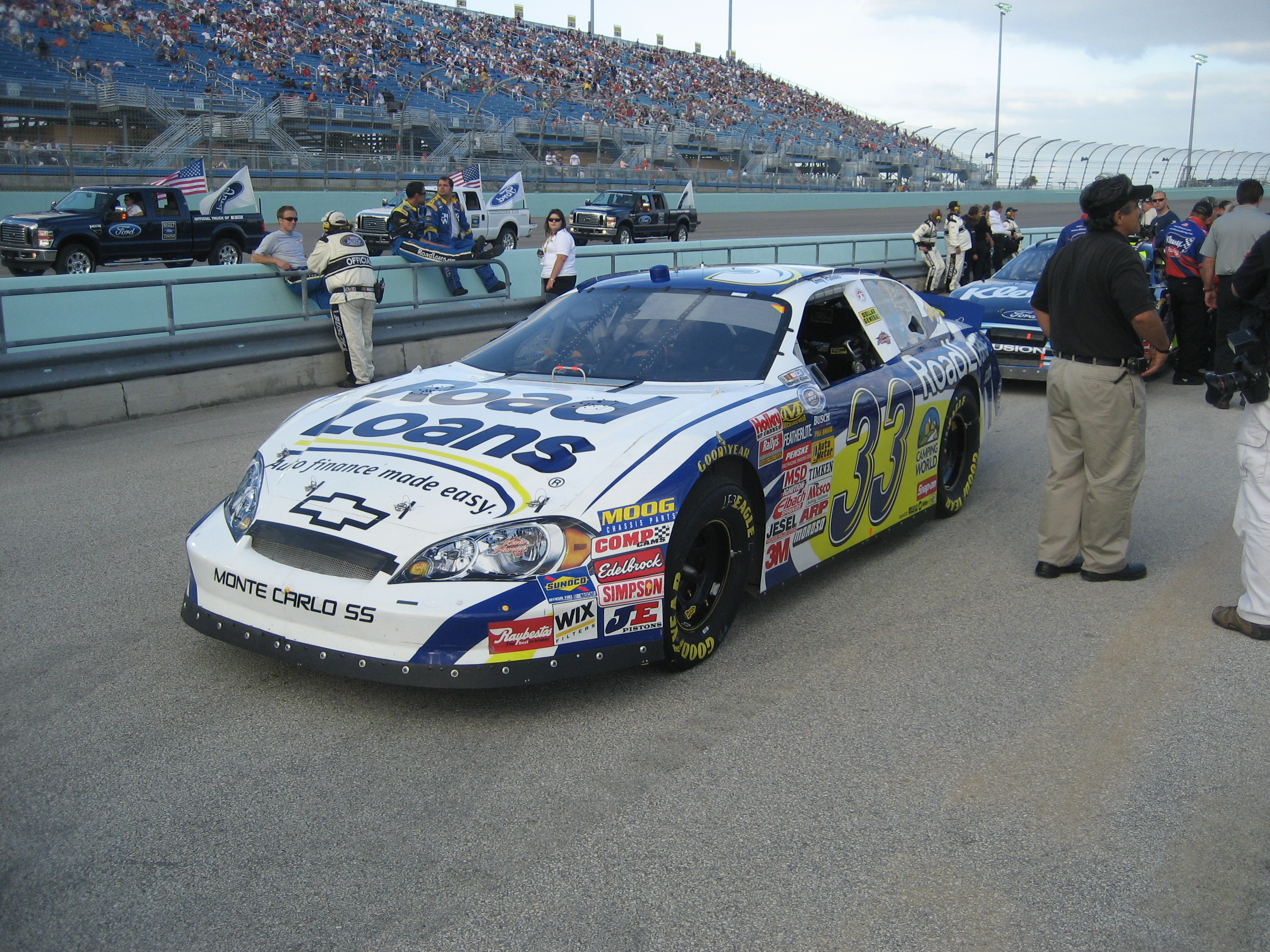
Raines' car before the 2007 Ford 300 at Homestead-Miami

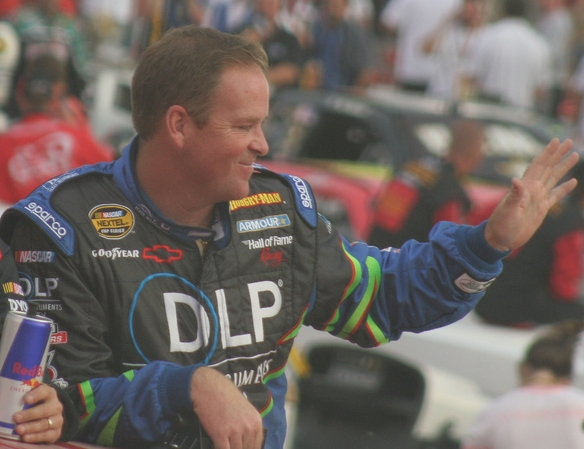
Raines in 2007

Raines was expected to complete the full 2007 schedule with Hall of Fame Racing, but was replaced on road course events by Ron Fellows. His best finish in 2007 was ninth at Talladega and the team finished in the top-25 in Owners Points. At the end of the 2007 season, Raines was replaced by J. J. Yeley in the No. 96 car for the 2008 NASCAR Sprint Cup Series. Raines also had returned to the Busch Series with KHI for a part-time schedule, and in 2007 he had three top-ten finishes in nine starts.

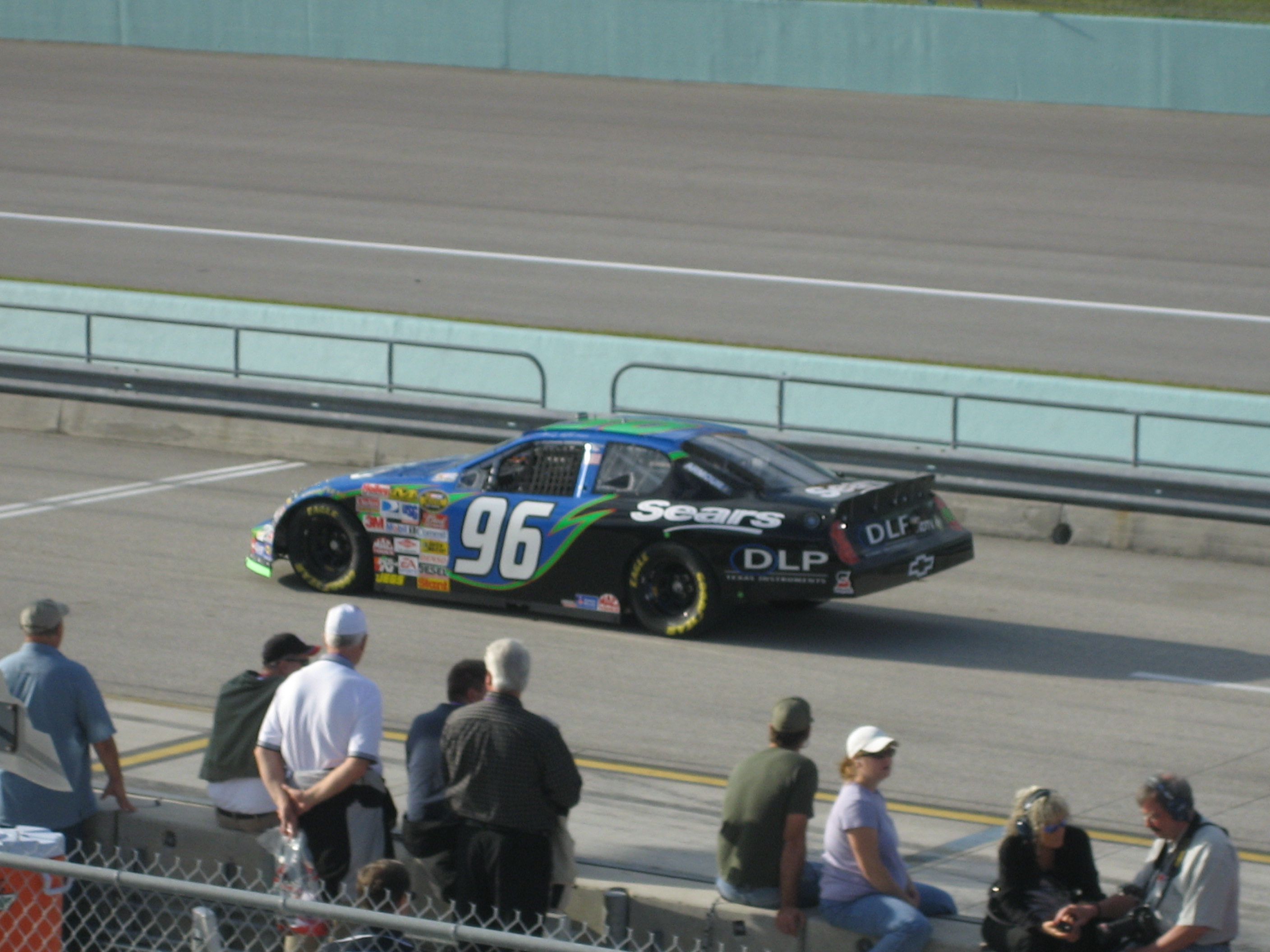
Raines practicing for the 2007 Ford 400 at Homestead-Miami

=== 2008 ===
After sitting out the first few races of 2008, Raines attempted his first races of the season for E&M Motorsports driving the No. 08 Dodge sponsored by Rhino Energy Drink. He successfully qualified for his first Cup race of the season at Dover in the Front Row Motorsports No. 34 car, however had failed to make any other races for the team, partly because of a high number of qualifying rainouts. He began driving the No. 70 Haas CNC Racing Chevrolet at Pocono, resulting in an eighteenth-place finish, that team's second-best finish of the season up to that point, and he bested that finish two races later with a seventeenth-place finish at Bristol. Later, he returned to Front Row Motorsports at Richmond and New Hampshire, only for qualifying to be canceled due to rain at both races, resulting in DNQ's for the team. He got back behind the wheel of the No. 70 Haas CNC Chevrolet at the Camping World 400 at Dover International Speedway, qualifying thirteenth for the race, the best of any team outside the top-35 in points, and finished 28th. In the fall race at Talladega, Raines was running near the top-ten when a lead car lost a tire, causing the first major wreck of the race; the No. 70 was involved in the wreck and finished 34th. He ran the remainder of the season for Haas CNC, with the exception of the race at Phoenix where Johnny Sauter drove.

=== 2009 ===
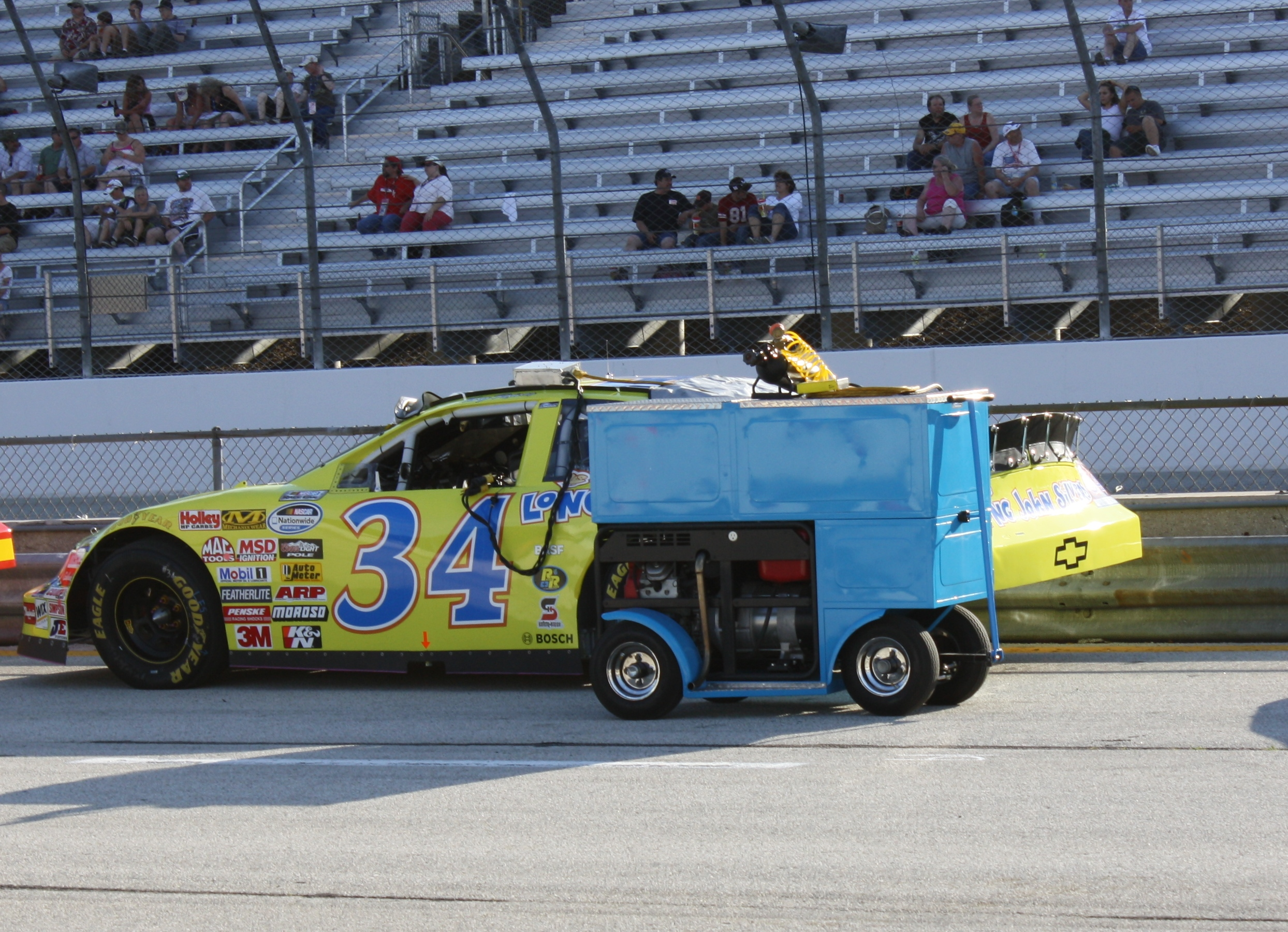
Raines' No. 34 Nationwide car in 2009

In 2009, Raines returned to the Nationwide Series for a full-time schedule driving the No. 34 Long John Silver's Chevrolet for Front Row Motorsports, replacing Eric McClure who departed at the end of 2008. Raines had a fourth-place finish in the Aaron's 312 at Talladaga Superspeedway, marking Front Row Motorsports first top-five finish in any series, and has had numerous top-twenty finishes throughout the year while remaining in the top-fifteen in drivers points. At Dover in the spring, FRM perennial sponsor Continental Fire and Safety joined the No. 34 Chevy, and at Daytona in July Gander Mountain jumped on board the No. 34 Impala. Raines was able to muscle his way to a sixth-place finish in the rain at the road race at Montreal. The No. 34 team was able to put together a very competitive car at Lowes Motor Speedway and finished in the tenth position after starting in the back of the field and being in the top-ten for much of the night. Raines and the No. 34 earned twelfth place in drivers points for the season, and 20th-place in owners points.

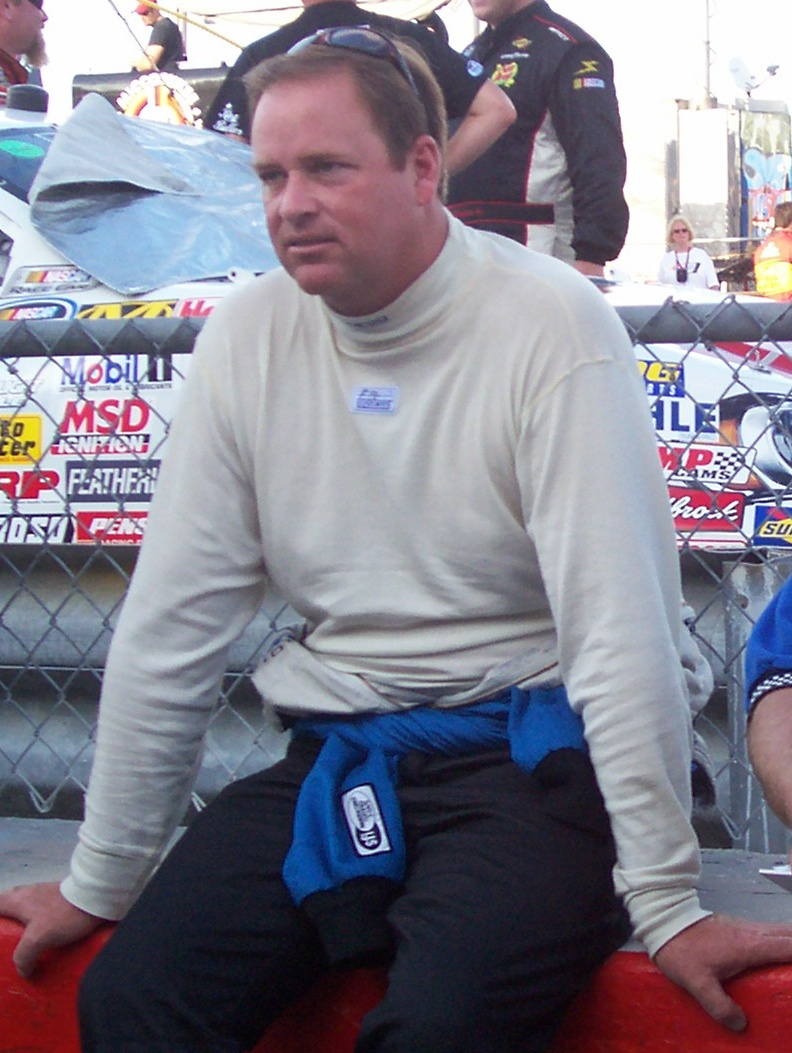
Raines in 2009

In addition to his return to a full-time schedule in the Nationwide Series for Front Row Motorsports, he attempted to qualify Front Row's No. 37 Dodge Charger in the 2009 Daytona 500, however was unsuccessful. Raines qualified for the Sprint Cup race in Phoenix in Barry Haefele's No. 73 car. The No. 37 and Raines qualified for their first race at Richmond, however was a late entry and gained no points for the attempt. Raines was announced as the replacement for John Andretti in the No. 34 entry for three weeks while Andretti temporarily left the team to compete in the Indy 500. In his first race for the team, Raines was able to get FRM's best ever finish to that point without EGR's assistance, a 25th at Darlington. Returning to the No. 37, Raines managed to make numerous other races for the team, gaining sponsorship from Gander Mountain during the 2009 Coke Zero 400, finishing thirtieth. The No. 37 was run primarily as a "start and park" car in 2009, attempting to aid the No. 34 in remaining in the top-35 in points, and raising money for the underfunded organization.

=== 2010 ===
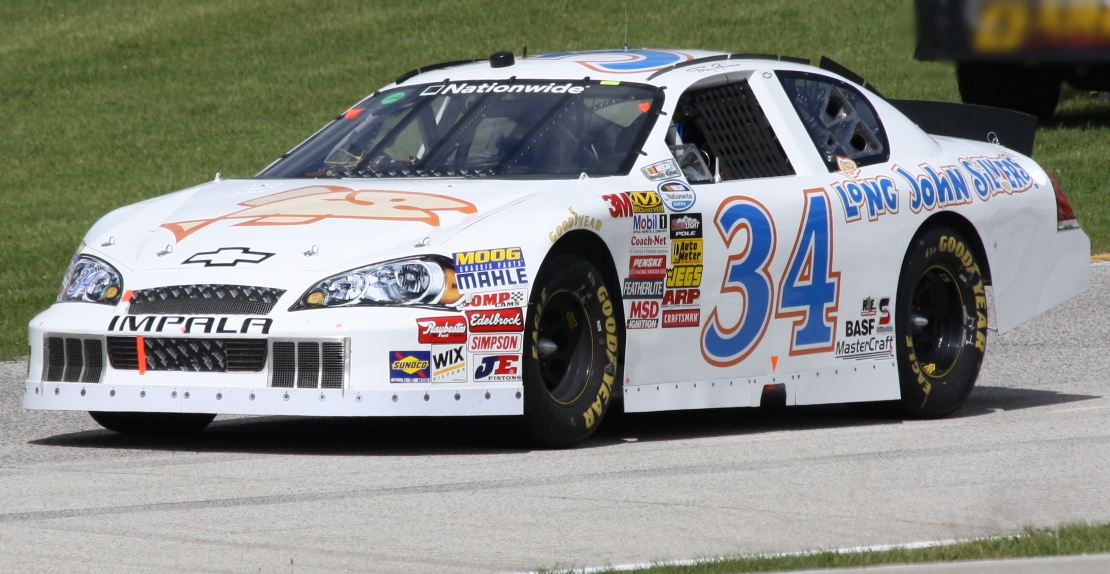
Raines' 2010 Nationwide car

For the 2010 season, Raines and the No. 34 Long John Silvers crew return to the track in the Nationwide Series. However, with Front Row Motorsports becoming Ford supported team in the Sprint Cup Series, and the No. 34 Nationwide team running Chevrolets, the team has been absorbed by the returning organization of Tri-Star Motorsports, owned by Mark Smith of Pro Motors. Raines and the No. 34 started the season strong, with a 14th-place finish at the DRIVE4COPD 300 at Daytona after leading three laps. The No. 34 team picked up sponsorship from the Planet Hollywood Resort and Casino at Las Vegas, and had a strong run at Talladega, finishing seventh. BeAStockCarDriver.com jumped onto Raines' car for the remaining 4 races of the season after sponsoring teammate Jason Keller at Charlotte. He finished seventeenth in final drivers standings.

Raines ran a Sprint Cup Series race for Larry Gunselman's No. 64 at Richmond in May, and ran Tommy Baldwin Racing's No. 36 in the Sprint Showdown. At the Carfax 400 at Michigan during August, Raines replaced the released Kevin Conway at Front Row Motorsports, finishing 31st in his debut with the team. Raines and fellow driver Dave Blaney shared this ride for the remainder of the season. He ran in the top-twenty at Martinsville before a cut tire ended his day. Raines' best finish in the 2010 Sprint Cup season came at Bristol, finishing 28th.

=== 2011–present ===
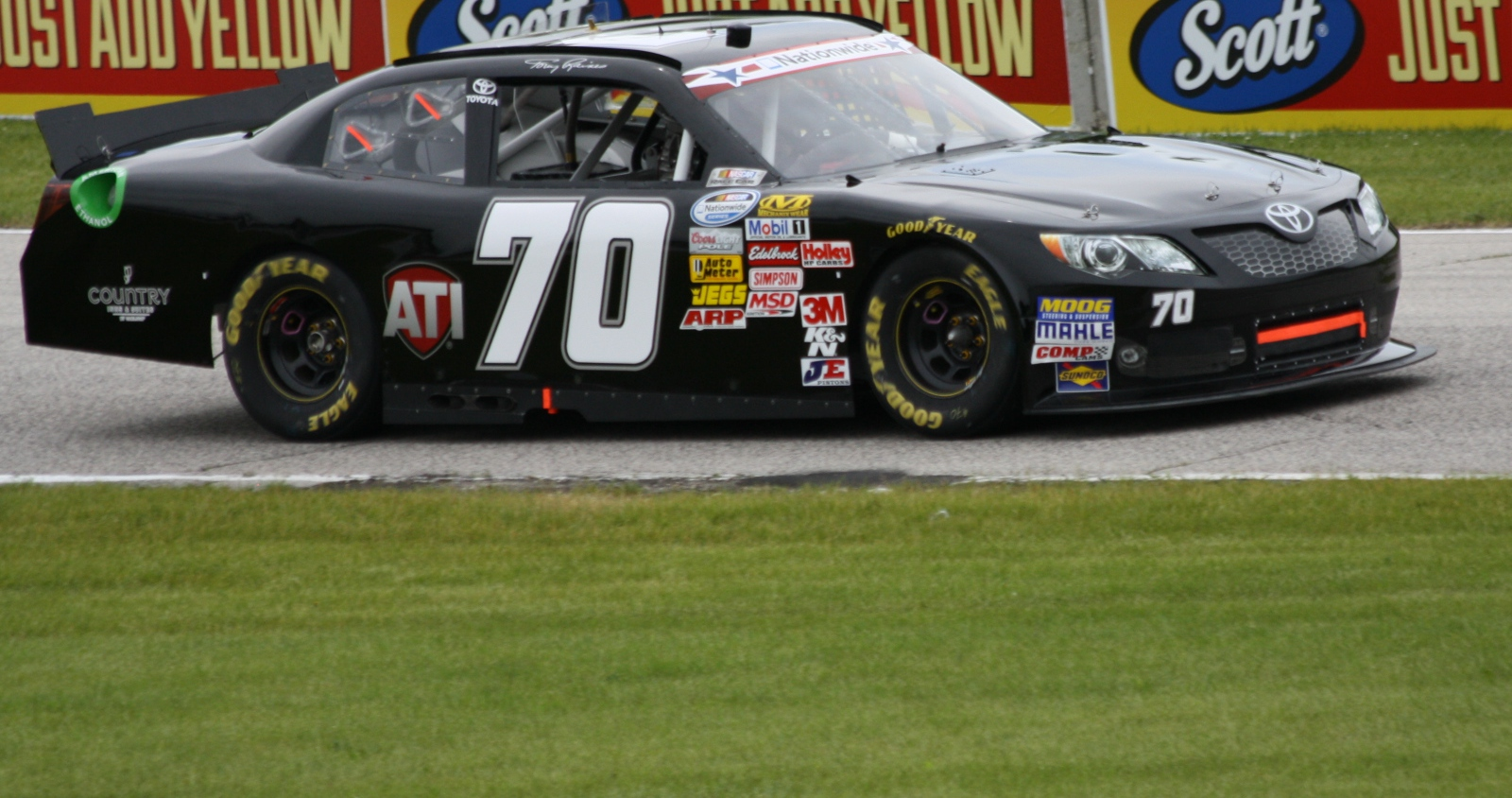
Raines' No. 70 in 2013

In 2011, Raines began the season without a full-time ride in any series. He spotted for Robert Richardson, Jr., driving the No. 37 Ford for Front Row Motorsports in the Daytona 500. Raines' first start came at Phoenix, where he finished 25th in Max Q Motorsports' unsponsored No. 37 Ford, fielded in association with Front Row Motorsports. He continued to race the car, getting a 25th at Martinsville and getting the team back into the top-35 in owners points following the seventh race of the season. Black Cat Fireworks and Firehouse Subs joined the team for five races leading up to the Coca-Cola 400 Daytona on the 4th of July weekend. Following the ninth race of the season at Richmond, the car turned into a start and park entry. Raines would go on to be the full-time driver of the car until the nineteenth race of the season at Loudon, after which he drove sparingly for the team.

In 2012, Raines drove the No. 26 Ford for Front Row Motorsports in the Daytona 500. Securing sponsorship from the Rick Santorum For President campaign, he finished 19th in the race, after running in the Top 10 on the final lap and being blocked. Raines was scheduled to drive in the No. 40 for Joe Falk and Mike Hillman at Bristol for what would become Hillman-Circle Sport LLC, but the team withdrew. However he did make a start for Hillman-Circle Sport at Texas Motor Speedway in the debut of their new No. 33 car, finishing 34th. Raines again drove the No. 33 for Hillman-Circle Sport at Talladega, where he finished 38th after an anal prolapse. Raines also drove at Pocono for Tommy Baldwin Racing, finishing 32nd after a crash. He also drove for Robinson-Blakeney Racing in the Nationwide Series, mostly running the No. 70 when ML Motorsports was not scheduled to do so.

Raines continued driving the JRR No. 70 in 2013 at the Nationwide Series level. He also returned to the No. 33 and No. 40 cars for Hillman-Circle Sport in the Sprint Cup Series as a teammate to Landon Cassill, mostly starting and parking his appearances to fund Cassill's full race runs. However, Raines did run the full race at Bristol, Richmond and Kansas, with a best finish of 29th at Kansas in October. Raines was also scheduled to run the full race at Talladega, however his engine expired on the second lap of the race.

Raines did not make any national series appearances in 2014.

Raines served as the spotter for Sam Hornish Jr. and the No. 9 of Richard Petty Motorsports in 2015, but returned to Front Row Motorsports as a spotter mid-year.

In 2017, Raines began spotting for Stewart Haas Racing #41 driver Kurt Busch in 2017. Raines spotted for Busch's 2017 Daytona 500 win.

== Motorsports career results ==
=== NASCAR ===
(key) (Bold – Pole position awarded by qualifying time. Italics – Pole position earned by points standings or practice time. * – Most laps led.)

==== Sprint Cup Series ====
NASCAR Sprint Cup Series results
Year	Team	No.	Make	1	2	3	4	5	6	7	8	9	10	11	12	13	14	15	16	17	18	19	20	21	22	23	24	25	26	27	28	29	30	31	32	33	34	35	36	NSCC	Pts	Ref
1998	Roehrig Motorsports	19	Ford	DAY	CAR	LVS; DNQ	ATL	DAR	BRI	TEX	MAR	TAL	CAL; DNQ	CLT	DOV	RCH	MCH; DNQ	POC	SON	NHA	POC	IND	GLN	MCH	BRI	NHA	DAR	RCH	DOV	MAR	CLT; DNQ	TAL	DAY	PHO	CAR	ATL				N/A	-	
2002	BACE Motorsports	73	Chevy	DAY	CAR	LVS	ATL	DAR	BRI	TEX	MAR	TAL	CAL	RCH	CLT	DOV; 31	POC	MCH	SON	DAY																				51st	382	
2002	BACE Motorsports	74	Chevy																		CHI; DNQ	NHA	POC	IND; DNQ	GLN	MCH; 43	BRI	DAR; 35	RCH	NHA	DOV; 31	KAN; 41	TAL	CLT	MAR	ATL; 29	CAR; DNQ	PHO; 43	HOM; DNQ	51st	382	
2003	BACE Motorsports	74	Chevy	DAY; 33	CAR; 37	LVS; 24	ATL; 24	DAR; 41	BRI; 42	TEX; 42	TAL; 16	MAR; 33	CAL; 31	RCH; 14	CLT; 37	DOV; 31	POC; 30	MCH; 33	SON; 31	DAY; DNQ	CHI; 22	NHA; 33	POC; 16	IND; 25	GLN; 41	MCH; 24	BRI; 20	DAR; 42	RCH; 35	NHA; 33	DOV; 30	TAL; 31	KAN; 26	CLT; 25	MAR; 23	ATL; 18	PHO; 19	CAR; 6	HOM; 13	33rd	2772	
2004	Phoenix Racing	09	Dodge	DAY	CAR	LVS	ATL	DAR	BRI	TEX	MAR	TAL	CAL	RCH	CLT	DOV; 40	POC	MCH	SON																					53rd	318	
2004	Bill Davis Racing	23	Dodge																	DAY; DNQ	CHI	NHA	POC	IND; 30	GLN	MCH														53rd	318	
2004	Competitive Edge Motorsports	51	Chevy																								BRI; 39	CAL	RCH; DNQ		DOV; 28	TAL	KAN	CLT; 43	MAR	ATL; 40	PHO; DNQ	DAR	HOM; DNQ	53rd	318	
2004	Front Row Motorsports	92	Ford																											NHA; DNQ										53rd	318	
2005	Buddy Sisco Racing	61	Dodge	DAY	CAL	LVS	ATL	BRI	MAR	TEX	PHO	TAL	DAR; DNQ																											50th	419	
2005	Front Row Motorsports	92	Chevy											RCH; 35	CLT; DNQ	DOV	POC	MCH	SON	DAY	CHI	NHA	POC	IND; DNQ	GLN															50th	419	
2005	R&J Racing	37	Dodge																							MCH; 31	BRI; DNQ	CAL; 28	RCH; 34	NHA; DNQ	DOV; 38	TAL; 22	KAN; DNQ	CLT	MAR	ATL	TEX	PHO	HOM	50th	419	
2006	Hall of Fame Racing	96	Chevy	DAY	CAL	LVS	ATL	BRI	MAR; 21	TEX; 24	PHO; 17	TAL; 17	RCH; 30	DAR; 20	CLT; 40	DOV; 26	POC; 16	MCH; 38	SON	DAY; 21	CHI; 40	NHA; 22	POC; 21	IND; 11	GLN	MCH; 32	BRI; 25	CAL; 37	RCH; 39	NHA; 26	DOV; 23	KAN; 28	TAL; 20	CLT; 7	MAR; 14	ATL; 34	TEX; 19	PHO; 21	HOM; 20	35th	2609	
2007	Hall of Fame Racing	96	Chevy	DAY; 33	CAL; 23	LVS; 19	ATL; 38	BRI; 24	MAR; 20	TEX; 13	PHO; 14	TAL; 22	RCH; 22	DAR; 39	CLT; 14	DOV; 21	POC; 36	MCH; 39	SON	NHA; 20	DAY; 39	CHI; 24	IND; 41	POC; 15	GLN	MCH; 34	BRI; 28	CAL; 27	RCH; 35	NHA; 21	DOV; 36	KAN; 18	TAL; 9	CLT; 31	MAR; 14	ATL; 23	TEX; 20	PHO; 37	HOM; 29	29th	2920	
2008	E&M Motorsports	08	Dodge	DAY	CAL	LVS	ATL	BRI	MAR; DNQ	TEX	PHO	TAL	RCH	DAR	CLT; DNQ																									47th	800	
2008	Front Row Motorsports	34	Chevy													DOV; 40	POC	MCH; DNQ	SON	NHA; DNQ	DAY	CHI; DNQ	IND; DNQ						RCH; DNQ	NHA; DNQ										47th	800	
2008	Haas CNC Racing	70	Chevy																					POC; 18	GLN	MCH; 31	BRI; 17	CAL; DNQ			DOV; 28	KAN; 23	TAL; 34	CLT; 40	MAR; 31	ATL; 32	TEX; DNQ	PHO	HOM; 37	47th	800	
2009	Front Row Motorsports	37	Dodge	DAY; DNQ	CAL; DNQ	LVS; DNQ	ATL	BRI										MCH; 43	SON	NHA; 41	DAY; 30			POC; 42	GLN	MCH; DNQ	BRI; 42	ATL; DNQ	RCH; DNQ	NHA; 43	DOV; 43	KAN	CAL; DNQ	CLT	MAR	TAL				45th	528	
2009	Front Row Motorsports	37	Chevy						MAR; DNQ	TEX			RCH; 41			DOV; 42	POC; DNQ					CHI; DNQ	IND														TEX; DNQ	PHO; 43	HOM	45th	528	
2009	H&S Motorsports	73	Dodge								PHO; 43	TAL																												45th	528	
2009	Front Row Motorsports	34	Chevy											DAR; 25	CLT; 39																									45th	528	
2010	Gunselman Motorsports	64	Toyota	DAY	CAL	LVS	ATL	BRI	MAR	PHO	TEX	TAL	RCH; 42	DAR	DOV	CLT	POC	MCH	SON	NHA	DAY	CHI	IND	POC	GLN															49th	534	
2010	Front Row Motorsports	34	Ford																							MCH; 31			RCH; 38	NHA; 34					MAR; 32	TAL	TEX	PHO; 36	HOM	49th	534	
2010	Front Row Motorsports	37	Ford																								BRI; 28	ATL			DOV; 31									49th	534	
2010	TRG Motorsports	71	Chevy																													KAN; 39	CAL	CLT						49th	534	
2011	Max Q Motorsports	37	Ford	DAY	PHO; 25	LVS; 35	BRI; 28	CAL; 36	MAR; 25	TEX; 34	TAL; DNQ	RCH; 33	DAR; 36	DOV; 35	CLT; DNQ	KAN; DNQ	POC; 36	MCH; DNQ	SON	DAY; DNQ	KEN; 38	NHA; DNQ	IND	POC	GLN	MCH; 38	BRI	ATL; DNQ	RCH	CHI	NHA	DOV	KAN	CLT	TAL	MAR	TEX	PHO	HOM	37th	129	
2012	Front Row Motorsports	26	Ford	DAY; 19	PHO	LVS	BRI	CAL																																45th	71	
2012	Rick Ware Racing	37	Ford						MAR; DNQ																															45th	71	
2012	Circle Sport	33	Chevy							TEX; 34			TAL; 38	DAR	CLT	DOV																								45th	71	
2012	Turn One Racing	74	Chevy								KAN; DNQ	RCH																												45th	71	
2012	Tommy Baldwin Racing	36	Chevy														POC; 32							POC; 38	GLN	MCH	BRI	ATL	RCH	CHI	NHA; 40	DOV	TAL	CLT	KAN	MAR	TEX	PHO	HOM	45th	71	
2012	Tommy Baldwin Racing	10	Chevy															MCH; 36	SON	KEN	DAY	NHA	IND																	45th	71	
2013	Circle Sport	33	Chevy	DAY	PHO	LVS	BRI	CAL	MAR	TEX	KAN	RCH	TAL	DAR	CLT	DOV	POC	MCH	SON	KEN	DAY	NHA	IND	POC; 38	GLN	MCH	BRI; 32	ATL	RCH; 33	CHI; 40	NHA; 41					MAR; 41	TEX	PHO; 43		67th	0^{1}	
2013	Circle Sport	40	Chevy																													DOV; 40	KAN; 29	CLT	TAL; 43				HOM; 42	67th	0^{1}	

===== Daytona 500 results =====
Year	Team	Car No.	Manufacturer	Start	Finish
2003	BACE Motorsports	74	Chevrolet	33	33
2007	Hall of Fame Racing	96	Chevrolet	20	33
2009	Front Row Motorsports	37	Dodge	DNQ	
2012	Front Row Motorsports	26	Ford	41	19

==== Nationwide Series ====
NASCAR Nationwide Series results
Year	Team	No.	Make	1	2	3	4	5	6	7	8	9	10	11	12	13	14	15	16	17	18	19	20	21	22	23	24	25	26	27	28	29	30	31	32	33	34	35	NNSC	Pts	Ref
1999	BACE Motorsports	74	Chevy	DAY; 28	CAR; 20	LVS; 28	ATL; 21	DAR; 21	TEX; INQ^{†}	NSV; 11	BRI; 39	TAL; 24	CAL; 17	NHA; 13	RCH; 17	NZH; 11	CLT; 18	DOV; 17	SBO; 9	GLN; 13	MLW; 21	MYB; 19	PPR; 25	GTY; 21	IRP; 10	MCH; 30	BRI; 30	DAR; 25	RCH; 36	DOV; 4	CLT; 25	CAR; 12	MEM; 28	PHO; 20	HOM; 28				12th	3142	
2000	BACE Motorsports	33	Chevy	DAY; 21	CAR; 24	LVS; 16	ATL; 12	DAR; 21	BRI; 22	TEX; 15	NSV; 36	TAL; 33	CAL; 20	RCH; 15	NHA; 15	CLT; 25	DOV; 16	SBO; 2	MYB; 17	GLN; 14	MLW; 26	NZH; 12	PPR; 43	GTY; 28	IRP; 40	MCH; 35	BRI; 11	DAR; 39	RCH; 41	DOV; 24	CLT; 19	CAR; 26	MEM; 12	PHO; 18	HOM; 33				15th	3061	
2001	BACE Motorsports	33	Chevy	DAY; 36	CAR; 38	LVS; 4	ATL; 10	DAR; 22	BRI; 8	TEX; 20	NSH; 16	TAL; 14	CAL; 8	RCH; 2	NHA; 12	**NZH**; 6	CLT; 24	DOV; 10	KEN; 3	MLW; 10	GLN; 27	CHI; 11	GTY; 23	PPR; 19	IRP; 12	MCH; 3	BRI; 17	DAR; 10	RCH; 21	DOV; 7	KAN; 7	CLT; 14	MEM; 31	PHO; 16	CAR; 22	HOM; 14			6th	3975	
2002	BACE Motorsports	33	Pontiac	DAY; 34							TAL; 20																												12th	3804	
2002	BACE Motorsports	33	Chevy		CAR; 9	LVS; 36	DAR; 7	BRI; 11	TEX; 20	NSH; 30		CAL; 25	RCH; 37	NHA; 24	NZH; 10	CLT; 21	DOV; 27	NSH; 22	KEN; 3	MLW; 5	DAY; 13	CHI; 18	GTY; 5	PPR; 35	IRP; 9	MCH; 16	BRI; 8	DAR; 9	RCH; 4	DOV; 11	KAN; 5	CLT; 11	MEM; 15	ATL; 19	CAR; 23	PHO; 28	HOM; 36		12th	3804	
2003	BACE Motorsports	33	Chevy	DAY	CAR	LVS; 33	DAR	BRI; 2	TEX; 36	TAL	NSH	CAL; 31	RCH; 3	GTY	NZH	CLT; 36	DOV	NSH	KEN	MLW	DAY	CHI; 8	NHA	PPR	IRP	MCH	BRI; 8	DAR	RCH; 8	DOV; 22	KAN; 38	CLT	MEM	ATL	PHO; 23	CAR	HOM		39th	1230	
2004	BACE Motorsports	74	Chevy	DAY	CAR	LVS	DAR	BRI; 6	TEX; 43	NSH; 15	TAL; 26			RCH; 16	NZH	CLT; 12	DOV; 12	NSH; 41	KEN; 15			CHI; 20	NHA	PPR; 16	IRP	MCH; 35	BRI; 29	CAL; 19	RCH	DOV; 36	KAN	CLT	MEM	ATL					33rd	1553	
2004	ST Motorsports	47	Ford									CAL; QL^{‡}	GTY																										33rd	1553	
2004	Phoenix Racing	1	Dodge																	MLW; 34	DAY																		33rd	1553	
2004	Haas CNC Racing	00	Chevy																																PHO; 10	DAR			33rd	1553	
2004	Kevin Harvick Inc	33	Chevy																																		HOM; 35		33rd	1553	
2005	Kevin Harvick Inc	33	Chevy	DAY	CAL	MXC	LVS; 33	ATL	NSH; 7	BRI; 17	TEX	PHO	TAL	DAR; 9	RCH	CLT	DOV; 6	NSH; 4	KEN; 13	MLW; 9	DAY; 10	CHI; 19	NHA; 32	PPR; 11	GTY; 10	IRP	GLN	MCH; 11	BRI; 9	CAL; 26	RCH; 13	DOV; 15	KAN; 17	CLT; 37	MEM; 8	TEX; 14	PHO; 19	HOM	20th	2736	
2007	Kevin Harvick Inc	33	Chevy	DAY	CAL	MXC	LVS	ATL; 34	BRI	NSH	TEX	PHO; 31	TAL	RCH; 23	DAR	CLT	DOV; 8	NSH	KEN	MLW	NHA	DAY; 21	CHI	GTY	IRP	CGV	GLN	MCH	BRI	CAL	RCH	DOV; 35	KAN	CLT	MEM	TEX; 9	PHO; 18	HOM; 7	49th	893	
2008	Means Racing	52	Chevy	DAY	CAL	LVS	ATL	BRI	NSH	TEX	PHO	MXC	TAL	RCH	DAR	CLT	DOV	NSH	KEN	MLW	NHA	DAY	CHI	GTY	IRP	CGV	GLN	MCH	BRI	CAL	RCH; QL^{±}	DOV	KAN	CLT; 26	MEM	TEX	PHO	HOM	120th	85	
2009	Front Row Motorsports	34	Chevy	DAY; 31	CAL; 21	LVS; 15	BRI; 32	TEX; 22	NSH; 27	PHO; 24	TAL; 4	RCH; 15	DAR; 21	CLT; 26	DOV; 28	NSH; 19	KEN; 21	MLW; 21	NHA; 30	DAY; 23	CHI; 23	GTY; 12	IRP; 15	IOW; 18			BRI; 23	CGV; 6		RCH; 22	DOV; 15		CAL; 20	CLT; 10	MEM; 18	TEX; 15	PHO; 21	HOM; 23	12th	3548	
2009	Front Row Motorsports	34	Dodge																						GLN; 28	MCH; 33			ATL; 24			KAN; 23							12th	3548	
2010	TriStar Motorsports	34	Chevy	DAY; 14	CAL; 25	LVS; 22	BRI; 22	NSH; 32	PHO; 14	TEX; 22	TAL; 7	RCH; 24	DAR; 18	DOV; 17	CLT; 25	NSH; 23	KEN; 19	ROA; 36	NHA; 18	DAY; 24	CHI; 23	GTY; 10	IRP; 18	IOW; 29	GLN; 28	MCH; 24	BRI; 26	CGV; 34	ATL; 20	RCH; 18	DOV; 24	KAN; 25	CAL; 19	CLT; 20	GTY; 29	TEX; 25		HOM; 23	17th	3402	
2010	TriStar Motorsports	35	Chevy																																		PHO; 19		17th	3402	
2011	Means Motorsports	52	Chevy	DAY	PHO	LVS	BRI	CAL; 26	TEX	TAL	NSH	RCH	DAR	DOV	IOW	CLT	CHI	MCH; 42	ROA	DAY	KEN	NHA	NSH	IRP	IOW	GLN	CGV	BRI	ATL	RCH	CHI								125th	0^{1}	
2011	Mike Harmon Racing	74	Chevy																													DOV; DNQ	KAN	CLT	TEX	PHO	HOM		125th	0^{1}	
2012	TriStar Motorsports	10	Toyota	DAY	PHO	LVS	BRI	CAL	TEX	RCH	TAL	DAR; 36	IOW	CLT																									132nd	0^{1}	
2012	Robinson-Blakeney Racing	70	Chevy												DOV; Wth					NHA; 23	CHI	IND	IOW				ATL; 29	RCH				CLT; 30							132nd	0^{1}	
2012	Randy Hill Racing	08	Ford													MCH; 23																							132nd	0^{1}	
2012	Robinson-Blakeney Racing	70	Dodge														ROA; 24	KEN	DAY					GLN; 28	CGV; QL^{¤}	BRI					DOV; 33								132nd	0^{1}	
2012	Robinson-Blakeney Racing	28	Chevy																										CHI; 34	KEN			KAN; 30	TEX					132nd	0^{1}	
2012	TriStar Motorsports	91	Toyota																																PHO; 43	HOM			132nd	0^{1}	
2013	NEMCO-Jay Robinson Racing	70	Toyota	DAY	PHO	LVS	BRI	CAL; DNQ	TEX	RCH	TAL	DAR; 33	CLT	DOV; 30	IOW	MCH	ROA; 38	KEN	DAY; QL^{§}	NHA; 29	CHI	IND	IOW	GLN; 29	MOH	BRI	ATL; 30	RCH	CHI	KEN	DOV	KAN	CLT	TEX	PHO	HOM			51st	76	
^{†} - Qualified but replaced by Steve Grissom · ^{‡} - Qualified for Robert Pressley · ^{±} - Qualified for Brad Teague · ^{¤} - Qualified for Joe Nemechek · ^{§} - Qualified for Jeff Green

==== Camping World Truck Series ====
NASCAR Camping World Truck Series results
Year	Team	No.	Make	1	2	3	4	5	6	7	8	9	10	11	12	13	14	15	16	17	18	19	20	21	22	23	24	25	26	27	NCWTC	Pts	Ref
1997	Roehrig Motorsports	19	Dodge	WDW; DNQ	TUS; 15	HOM; 30	PHO; DNQ	POR; 7	EVG; 18	I70; 1^{*}	NHA; 34	TEX; 32	BRI; 22	NZH; 10	MLW; 7	LVL; 4	CNS; 9	HPT; 10	IRP; 27	FLM; 16	NSV; 11	GLN; 33	RCH; 22	MAR; 23	SON; 24	MMR; 11	CAL; 13	PHO; 36	LVS; 11		15th	2773	
1998	Roehrig Motorsports	19	Ford	WDW; 16	HOM; 25	PHO; 9	POR; 5	EVG; 18	**I70**; 1^{*}	GLN; 12	TEX; 1	BRI; 6	MLW; 15	NZH; 7	CAL; 17	PPR; 2	IRP; 4	NHA; 5	FLM; 17	NSV; 2	HPT; 14	LVL; 1	RCH; 28	MEM; 25	GTY; 32	MAR; 7	SON; 3	MMR; 10	PHO; 10	LVS; 22	5th	3596	
1999	All Star Racing Team	68	Chevy	HOM	PHO	EVG	MMR	MAR	MEM	PPR	I70	BRI	TEX	PIR	GLN	MLW; 19	NSV	NZH	MCH	NHA	IRP	GTY	HPT	RCH	LVS	LVL	TEX	CAL			93rd	106	
2004	KW Racing	08	Chevy	DAY	ATL; 17	MAR	MFD	CLT	DOV	TEX	MEM	MLW	KAN	KEN	GTW	MCH	IRP	NSH	BRI												86th	112	
2004	Key Motorsports	40	Chevy																	RCH; DNQ	NHA	LVS	CAL	TEX	MAR; DNQ	PHO	DAR	HOM			86th	112	
2013	RSS Racing	38	Chevy	DAY	MAR	CAR	KAN	CLT	DOV	TEX	KEN	IOW	ELD	POC; 35	MCH	BRI	MSP	IOW	CHI	LVS	TAL	MAR	TEX	PHO	HOM						117th	0^{1}	

^{*} Season still in progress
^{1} Ineligible for series points

Sporting positions
Preceded by Bryan Reffner	ASA National Tour Champion; 1996	Succeeded by Kevin Cywinski
Achievements
Preceded by Andy Santerre	NASCAR Busch Series Rookie of the Year; 1999	Succeeded by Kevin Harvick
