= 2008 Dickies 500 =

Race details
- Race 34 of 36 in the 2008 NASCAR Sprint Cup Series
- Simple line diagram of Texas Motor Speedway track layout
- Date: November 2, 2008
- Official name: Samsung Mobile 500
- Location: Texas Motor Speedway in Fort Worth, Texas
- Course: Permanent racing facility
- Course length: 1.5 miles (2.4 km)
- Distance: 334 laps, 501 mi (806.3 km)
- Weather: Temperatures reaching up to 84.9 °F (29.4 °C); wind speeds up to 15 miles per hour (24 km/h)

Pole position
Driver	Jeff Gordon	Hendrick Motorsports
- Time: 28.652

Most laps led
Driver	Carl Edwards	Roush Fenway Racing
- Laps: 212

Winner
No. 99	Carl Edwards	Roush Fenway Racing

Television in the United States
- Network: ABC

The 2008 Dickies 500 was a NASCAR Cup Series motor race held on November 2, 2008, at Texas Motor Speedway in Fort Worth, Texas. Contested over 334 laps on the 1.5-mile (2.4 km) asphalt quad-oval, it was the 34th race of the 2008 Sprint Cup Series season. The race was won by Carl Edwards for the Roush Fenway Racing team. Jeff Gordon finished second, and Jamie McMurray clinched third.

This race marked the debut of 2012 Champion Brad Keselowski.

== Qualifying ==
Jeff Gordon won the pole position, with Martin Truex Jr. joining him on the front row.

This was the Sprint Cup Debut of Brad Keselowski and the return of the No. 25 car from Hendrick Motorsports. It was third qualifying attempt and first race start for Joey Logano.

Failed to qualify: Tony Raines (#70), Bryan Clauson (#40), Chad McCumbee (#45), Max Papis (#13), Johnny Sauter (#08).

== Recap ==
Carl Edwards used fuel mileage to sweep the season series at TMS. Points leader Jimmie Johnson finished one lap down in 15th place, but still led Edwards by 106 points.
