= 2005 Budweiser Shootout =

Race details
- Race 1 of 2 exhibition races of the 2005 NASCAR Nextel Cup Series
- Date: February 12, 2005
- Official name: 27th Annual Budweiser Shootout
- Location: Daytona Beach, Florida, Daytona International Speedway
- Course: Permanent racing facility
- Course length: 4.0 km (2.5 miles)
- Distance: 70 laps, 175 mi (281.635 km)
- Scheduled distance: 70 laps, 175 mi (281.635 km)
- Average speed: 181.399 miles per hour (291.933 km/h)
- Attendance: 120,000

Pole position
Driver	Dale Jarrett	Robert Yates Racing
- Grid positions set by ballot

Most laps led
Driver	Greg Biffle	Roush Racing
- Laps: 44

Winner
No. 48	Jimmie Johnson	Hendrick Motorsports

Television in the United States
- Network: FOX
- Announcers: Mike Joy, Larry McReynolds, Darrell Waltrip

Radio in the United States
- Radio: Motor Racing Network

The 2005 Budweiser Shootout was the first exhibition stock car race of the 2005 NASCAR Nextel Cup Series season and the 27th iteration of the event. The race was held on Saturday, February 12, 2005, in Daytona Beach, Florida, at Daytona International Speedway, a 2.5 miles (4.0 km) permanent triangular-shaped superspeedway, before a crowd of 120,000. The race took the scheduled 70 laps to complete. In an action-packed race, Jimmie Johnson of Hendrick Motorsports would take the lead on lap 55 and hold off the field to win his first Budweiser Shootout. To fill out the podium, Ryan Newman of Penske Racing and Jeff Gordon of Hendrick Motorsports would finish second and third, respectively.

== Background ==
=== Format and eligibility ===
The race was broken up into two segments: a 20-lap segment, followed by a ten-minute intermission, concluding with a 50-lap second segment. While a pit stop was no longer required by rule, a reduction in fuel cell size (from 22 gallons to 13.5 gallons) made a fuel stop necessary. (In 2007, fuel cells were expanded to 18.5 gallons.) Many drivers also changed two tires during their fuel stop, as the time required to fuel the car allowed for a two-tire change without additional delay.

Pole winners of the previous season were automatically eligible for the race. Then, previous winners who had not already qualified would receive automatic berths.

=== Entry list ===
#	Driver	Team	Make	Sponsor
01	Joe Nemechek	MB2 Motorsports	Chevrolet	U. S. Army
2	Rusty Wallace	Penske Racing	Dodge	Miller Lite, Rusty's Last Call
6	Mark Martin	Roush Racing	Ford	Kraft Win Free Groceries For Life!
8	Dale Earnhardt Jr.	Dale Earnhardt, Inc.	Chevrolet	Budweiser Born On Date 02-12-05
9	Kasey Kahne	Evernham Motorsports	Dodge	Dodge Charger Go Mango! Retro
12	Ryan Newman	Penske Racing	Dodge	Alltel
16	Greg Biffle	Roush Racing	Ford	National Guard
18	Bobby Labonte	Joe Gibbs Racing	Chevrolet	Interstate Batteries
19	Jeremy Mayfield	Evernham Motorsports	Dodge	Dodge Charger Top Banana Retro
20	Tony Stewart	Joe Gibbs Racing	Chevrolet	The Home Depot
21	Ricky Rudd	Wood Brothers Racing	Ford	Motorcraft
24	Jeff Gordon	Hendrick Motorsports	Chevrolet	DuPont
25	Brian Vickers	Hendrick Motorsports	Chevrolet	GMAC
39	Bill Elliott	Chip Ganassi Racing with Felix Sabates	Dodge	Coors Light Retro
41	Casey Mears	Chip Ganassi Racing with Felix Sabates	Dodge	Target
44	Terry Labonte*	Hendrick Motorsports	Chevrolet	Kellogg's
48	Jimmie Johnson	Hendrick Motorsports	Chevrolet	Lowe's
49	Ken Schrader	BAM Racing	Dodge	Schwan's Home Service
88	Dale Jarrett	Robert Yates Racing	Ford	UPS
93	Geoff Bodine	GIC–Mixon Motorsports	Chevrolet	Global Industrial Contractors
97	Kurt Busch	Roush Racing	Ford	Crown Royal
Official entry list

*Terry Labonte would decide to withdraw from the race, as he was still angry at NASCAR's actions at the 2004 Budweiser Shootout. Labonte had stated that NASCAR said that cars were not allowed to pit, but near the end of the race, cars were allowed to pit. Labonte would not pit and finish eighth. According to Labonte, "What happened last year is the reason I'm not in it this year."

== Starting lineup ==
The starting lineup was determined by a blind draw. Dale Jarrett of Robert Yates Racing would draw the pole for the race.

Pos.	#	Driver	Team	Make
1	88	Dale Jarrett	Robert Yates Racing	Ford
2	16	Greg Biffle	Roush Racing	Ford
3	39	Bill Elliott	Chip Ganassi Racing with Felix Sabates	Dodge
4	25	Brian Vickers	Hendrick Motorsports	Chevrolet
5	49	Ken Schrader	BAM Racing	Dodge
6	97	Kurt Busch	Roush Racing	Ford
7	12	Ryan Newman	Penske Racing	Dodge
8	20	Tony Stewart	Joe Gibbs Racing	Chevrolet
9	21	Ricky Rudd	Wood Brothers Racing	Ford
10	19	Jeremy Mayfield	Evernham Motorsports	Dodge
11	24	Jeff Gordon	Hendrick Motorsports	Chevrolet
12	8	Dale Earnhardt Jr.	Dale Earnhardt, Inc.	Chevrolet
13	9	Kasey Kahne	Evernham Motorsports	Dodge
14	6	Mark Martin	Roush Racing	Ford
15	2	Rusty Wallace	Penske Racing	Dodge
16	01	Joe Nemechek	MB2 Motorsports	Chevrolet
17	48	Jimmie Johnson	Hendrick Motorsports	Chevrolet
18	41	Casey Mears	Chip Ganassi Racing with Felix Sabates	Dodge
19	18	Bobby Labonte	Joe Gibbs Racing	Chevrolet
20	93	Geoff Bodine	GIC–Mixon Motorsports	Chevrolet
21	44	Terry Labonte*	Hendrick Motorsports	Chevrolet
Official starting lineup

*Withdrew.

== Race results ==
Fin	St	#	Driver	Team	Make	Laps	Led	Status	Winnings
1	17	48	Jimmie Johnson	Hendrick Motorsports	Chevrolet	70	16	running	$212,945
2	7	12	Ryan Newman	Penske Racing	Dodge	70	4	running	$112,445
3	11	24	Jeff Gordon	Hendrick Motorsports	Chevrolet	70	0	running	$62,445
4	8	20	Tony Stewart	Joe Gibbs Racing	Chevrolet	70	0	running	$52,445
5	2	16	Greg Biffle	Roush Racing	Ford	70	44	running	$50,445
6	6	97	Kurt Busch	Roush Racing	Ford	70	0	running	$48,445
7	12	8	Dale Earnhardt Jr.	Dale Earnhardt, Inc.	Chevrolet	70	0	running	$46,445
8	14	6	Mark Martin	Roush Racing	Ford	70	0	running	$45,445
9	13	9	Kasey Kahne	Evernham Motorsports	Dodge	70	0	running	$44,445
10	19	18	Bobby Labonte	Joe Gibbs Racing	Chevrolet	70	3	running	$43,445
11	16	01	Joe Nemechek	MB2 Motorsports	Chevrolet	70	0	running	$41,445
12	9	21	Ricky Rudd	Wood Brothers Racing	Ford	70	0	running	$40,445
13	18	41	Casey Mears	Chip Ganassi Racing with Felix Sabates	Dodge	70	2	running	$39,445
14	15	2	Rusty Wallace	Penske Racing	Dodge	70	0	running	$38,445
15	1	88	Dale Jarrett	Robert Yates Racing	Ford	70	1	running	$37,445
16	5	49	Ken Schrader	BAM Racing	Dodge	70	0	running	$36,445
17	3	39	Bill Elliott	Chip Ganassi Racing with Felix Sabates	Dodge	70	0	running	$35,445
18	10	19	Jeremy Mayfield	Evernham Motorsports	Dodge	70	0	running	$34,445
19	4	25	Brian Vickers	Hendrick Motorsports	Chevrolet	46	0	rear end	$33,445
20	20	93	Geoff Bodine	GIC–Mixon Motorsports	Chevrolet	9	0	too slow	$31,445
21	21	44	Terry Labonte	Hendrick Motorsports	Chevrolet	0	0	withdrew	$0
Official race results
