= 2005 NASCAR Nextel Cup Series =

American motorsport season

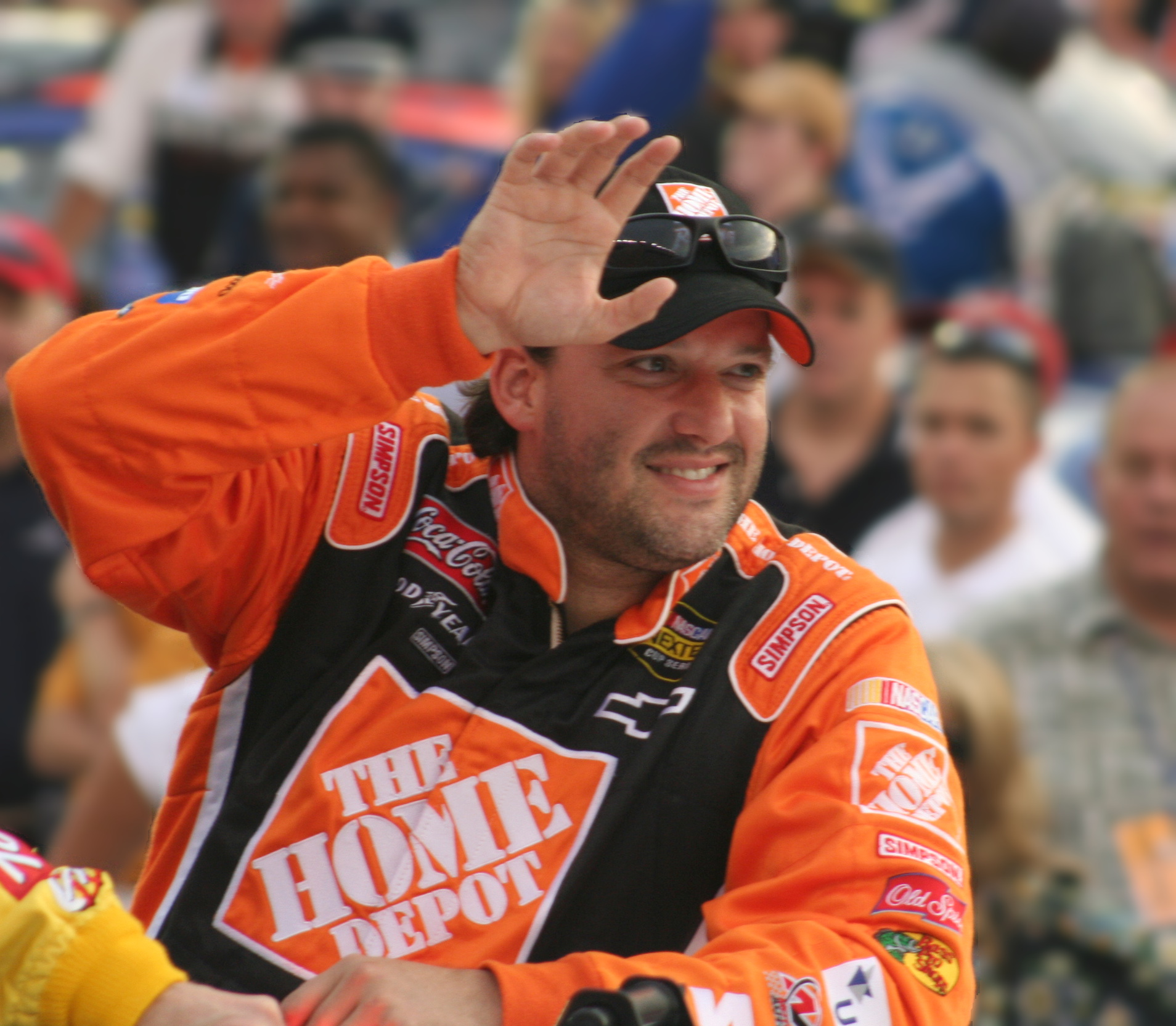
Tony Stewart, the 2005 Nextel Cup Series champion.

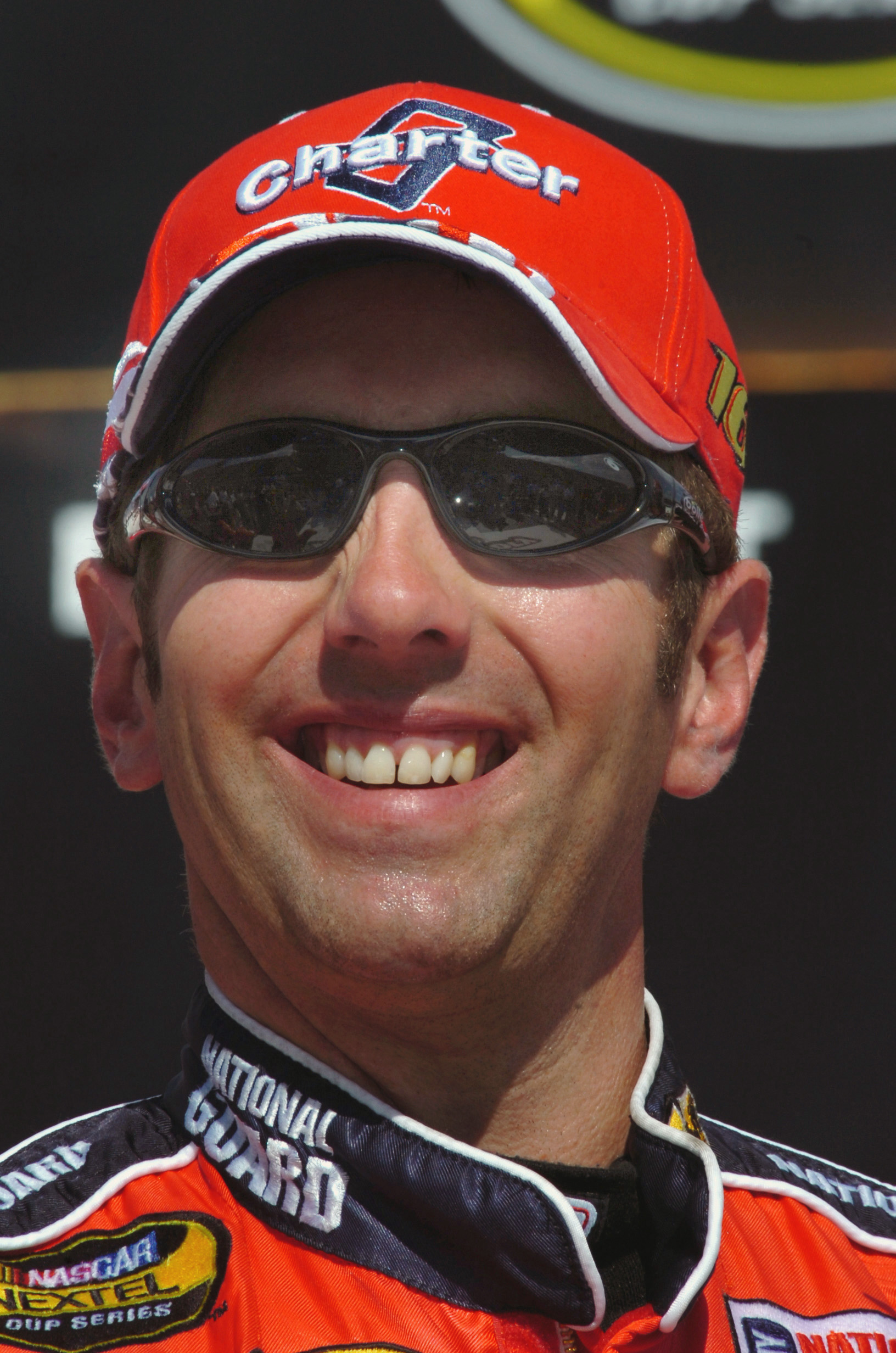
Greg Biffle came in second behind Stewart by 35 points.

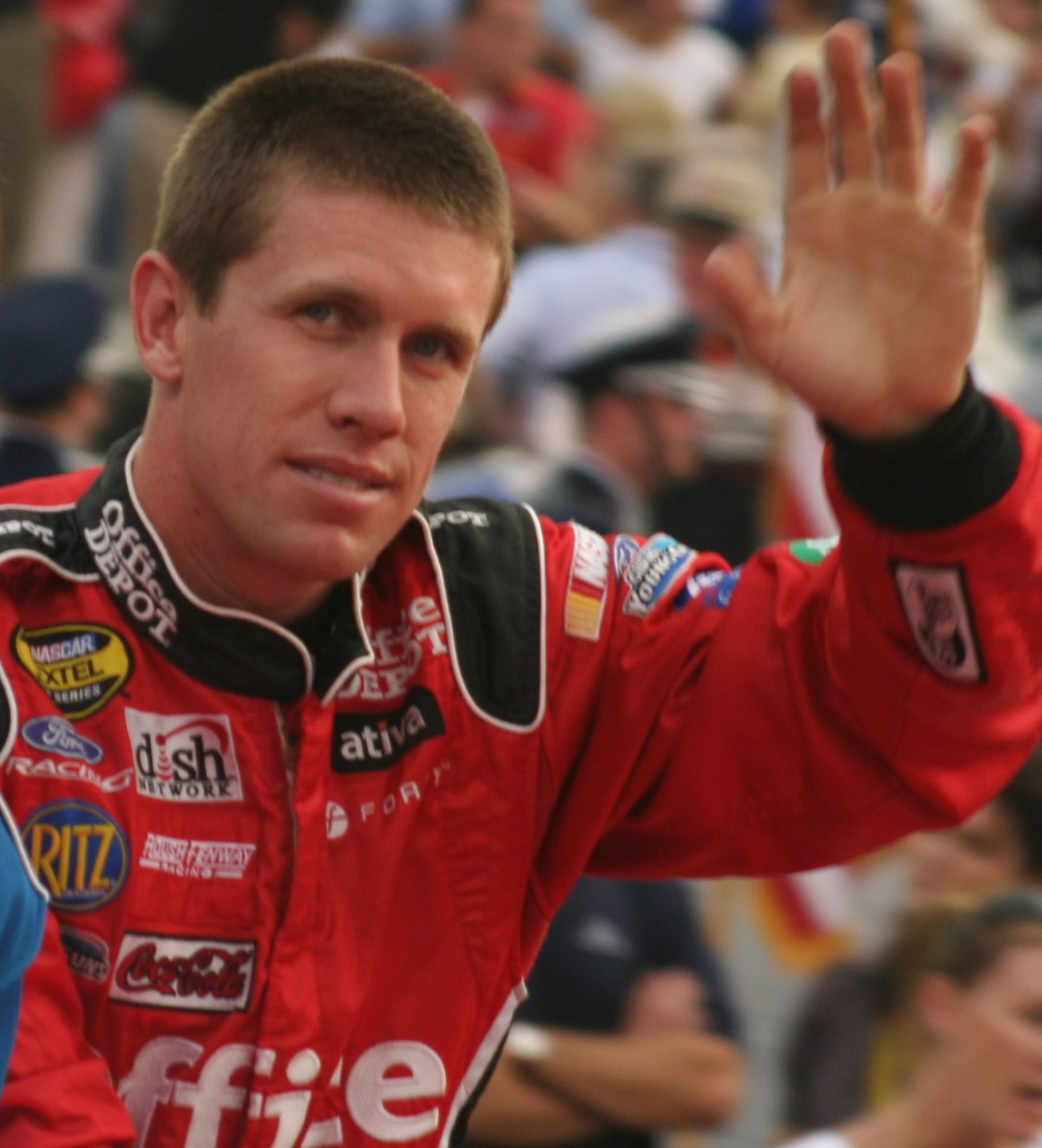
Carl Edwards finished third in the championship.

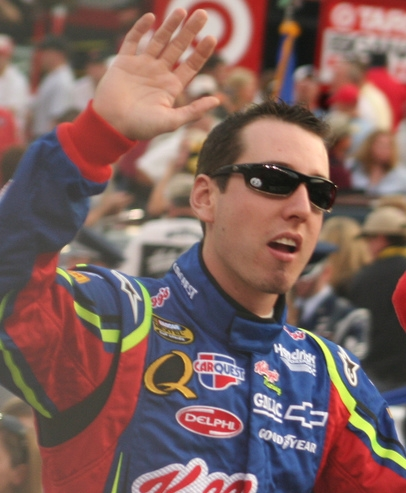
Kyle Busch, the 2005 NASCAR Rookie of the Year.

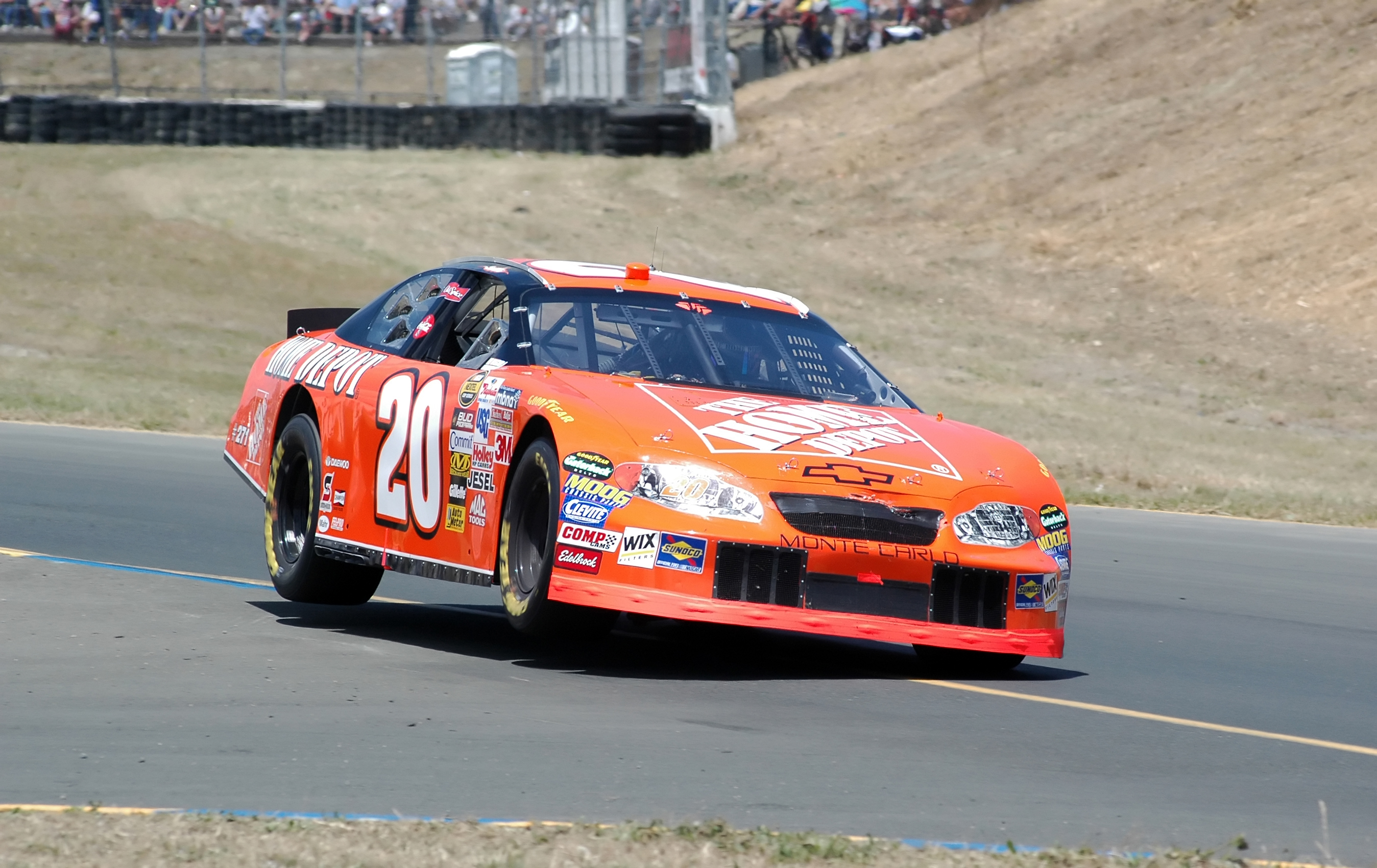
Chevrolet win the Manufacturers' Championship with 17 wins.

The 2005 NASCAR Nextel Cup Series was the 57th season of professional stock car racing in the United States and the 34th modern-era Cup series. The season began on Saturday, February 12. The ten-race Chase for the Nextel Cup started with the Sylvania 300 on Sunday, September 18, and ended on Sunday, November 20, with the Ford 400.

Tony Stewart was the dominant driver going into the ten race "playoff" with five wins. Going into the final race before the Chase for the Nextel Cup, Stewart had amassed a 209-point lead over his nearest competitor, Greg Biffle. Points are reset going into the Chase for the cup, and Stewart's lead was dropped to a 5-point margin. Leading into the final race before the Chase, ten racers were still mathematically contending for the final four spots in the Chase and only one point separated Jamie McMurray in 10th from Ryan Newman in 11th. In the end, the ten racers who qualified for the Chase for the Cup were:

1. Tony Stewart (3716)
2. Greg Biffle (−185)
3. Rusty Wallace (−304)
4. Jimmie Johnson (−316)
5. Kurt Busch (−412)
6. Mark Martin (−443)
7. Jeremy Mayfield (−488)
8. Carl Edwards (−602)
9. Matt Kenseth (−602)
10. Ryan Newman (−661)

Overall, Roush Racing was the dominant team going into the Chase for the Cup with five of the ten final racers from their organization (Biffle, Busch, Martin, Edwards, and Kenseth).

This was the first season since his rookie season that Jeff Gordon did not finish in the top 10 in points. The 2005 season was the only time Jeff Gordon failed to qualify for the Chase and one of only two seasons (alongside 1993) in which he did not finish in the top 10 in points.

The 2005 season was the first year of competition for the Dodge Charger since 1977, which replaced the Dodge Intrepid, a model that Dodge dropped from its consumer lineup for the 2005 model year. The change did little to improve Dodge's fortunes as a distant third manufacturer in NASCAR Nextel Cup behind Ford and Chevrolet. In 2004, Dodge won 4 of 36 cup races with the Intrepid. In 2005, the Charger won three races. The Charger was, however, much more of a success in the Busch Series, winning 10 of 32.

The 2005 season was the final year for the Ford Taurus, which was replaced by the Ford Fusion in the 2006 season. In addition, two prominent drivers announced that this would be their final season in NASCAR: Mark Martin, and 1989 Winston Cup Champion Rusty Wallace. Wallace would stay with his word and retire at season's end, but Martin, however, would return for 2006 due to circumstances with Roush Racing and Kurt Busch at the end of 2005. He would then run a limited schedule in 2007 and 2008, then drive full-time Hendrick Motorsports between 2009 and 2011, picking up an additional 5 wins with the team, and then finally run part-time again before officially retiring at the end of the 2013 season. Also, Ricky Rudd took a break after the 2005 season but returned at the beginning of 2007.

One of the biggest controversies prior to the start of the season involved the elimination of two races – Darlington and North Carolina Speedway in Rockingham. The eliminated Rockingham race ends NASCAR's 38-year association with Rockingham. The races were replaced by new races at Texas and Phoenix. NASCAR also began moving start times later in the day starting this season; by 2007 the Daytona 500 finished in primetime.

Also, NASCAR announced in January 2005 that the owners of the teams in the top 35 of the previous year's standings would be guaranteed a starting spot in each of the first five races of the season. This further complicated the unique qualifying procedure for the Daytona 500 and severely affected the chances of some teams to make races after having a poor 2004. After the fifth race, the guaranteed starters were based on the current season's points, with changes possible from race to race depending on results.

The number of cars entered for each race was up slightly from the previous year. The Daytona 500 saw a dramatic increase in its car count from 45 to 56. The increase was in part attributable to a new NASCAR rule that allowed hard liquor brands to become sponsors on its race cars. Roush Racing (Crown Royal), Richard Childress Racing (Jack Daniels), and Robby Gordon Motorsports (Jim Beam) were the first to sign such deals.

At the end of the 2005 season, Chevrolet won the NASCAR Manufacturers' Championship after winning 17 events and garnering 259 points over second-place Ford who captured 16 victories and 246 points.

== Teams and drivers ==
=== Complete schedule ===
There were 40 teams that attempted every race in 2005.

Manufacturer	Team	No.	Drivers	Crew Chiefs
Chevrolet	Dale Earnhardt, Inc.	8	Dale Earnhardt Jr.	Pete Rondeau 11; Steve Hmiel 15; Tony Eury Jr. 10
Chevrolet	Dale Earnhardt, Inc.	15	Michael Waltrip	Tony Eury Jr. 26; Tony Gibson 10
Chevrolet	Front Row Motorsports	92	Stanton Barrett (R) 12	Fred Wanke
Chevrolet	Front Row Motorsports	92	Tony Raines 3	Fred Wanke
Chevrolet	Front Row Motorsports	92	Hermie Sadler 8	Fred Wanke
Chevrolet	Front Row Motorsports	92	Eric McClure (R) 2	Fred Wanke
Chevrolet	Front Row Motorsports	92	Kenny Wallace 1	Fred Wanke
Chevrolet	Front Row Motorsports	92	Johnny Miller 1	Fred Wanke
Chevrolet	Front Row Motorsports	92	Joey McCarthy 1	Fred Wanke
Chevrolet	Front Row Motorsports	92	Mike Skinner 1	Fred Wanke
Chevrolet	Front Row Motorsports	92	P. J. Jones 4	Fred Wanke
Chevrolet	Front Row Motorsports	92	Chad Chaffin 3	Fred Wanke
Chevrolet	Haas CNC Racing	0	Mike Bliss	Bootie Barker
Chevrolet	Hendrick Motorsports	5	Kyle Busch (R)	Alan Gustafson
Chevrolet	Hendrick Motorsports	24	Jeff Gordon	Robbie Loomis 26; Steve Letarte 10
Chevrolet	Hendrick Motorsports	25	Brian Vickers	Lance McGrew
Chevrolet	Hendrick Motorsports	48	Jimmie Johnson	Chad Knaus
Chevrolet	Joe Gibbs Racing	11	Jason Leffler 20	Dave Rogers 11; Mike Ford 25
Chevrolet	Joe Gibbs Racing	11	Terry Labonte 5	Dave Rogers 11; Mike Ford 25
Chevrolet	Joe Gibbs Racing	11	J. J. Yeley 4	Dave Rogers 11; Mike Ford 25
Chevrolet	Joe Gibbs Racing	11	Denny Hamlin 7	Dave Rogers 11; Mike Ford 25
Chevrolet	Joe Gibbs Racing	18	Bobby Labonte	Steve Addington
Chevrolet	Joe Gibbs Racing	20	Tony Stewart	Greg Zipadelli
Chevrolet	MB2 Motorsports	01	Joe Nemechek	Ryan Pemberton
Chevrolet	MBV Motorsports	10	Scott Riggs	Doug Randolph
Chevrolet	Morgan-McClure Motorsports	4	Mike Wallace 31	Chris Carrier
Chevrolet	Morgan-McClure Motorsports	4	P. J. Jones 2	Chris Carrier
Chevrolet	Morgan-McClure Motorsports	4	John Andretti 2	Chris Carrier
Chevrolet	Morgan-McClure Motorsports	4	Todd Bodine 1	Chris Carrier
Chevrolet	PPI Motorsports	32	Bobby Hamilton Jr. 34	Harold Holly
Chevrolet	PPI Motorsports	32	Ron Fellows 2	Harold Holly
Chevrolet	Richard Childress Racing	07	Dave Blaney	Phillipe Lopez
Chevrolet	Richard Childress Racing	29	Kevin Harvick	Todd Berrier
Chevrolet	Richard Childress Racing	31	Jeff Burton	Kevin Hamlin
Chevrolet	Robby Gordon Motorsports	7	Robby Gordon	Bob Temple
Dodge	BAM Racing	49	Ken Schrader	David Hyder
Dodge	Bill Davis Racing	22	Scott Wimmer	Derrick Finley
Dodge	Chip Ganassi Racing with Felix Sabates	40	Sterling Marlin 35	Steve Boyer
Dodge	Chip Ganassi Racing with Felix Sabates	40	Scott Pruett 1	Steve Boyer
Dodge	Chip Ganassi Racing with Felix Sabates	41	Casey Mears	Jimmy Elledge
Dodge	Chip Ganassi Racing with Felix Sabates	42	Jamie McMurray	Donnie Wingo
Dodge	Evernham Motorsports	9	Kasey Kahne	Tommy Baldwin Jr.
Dodge	Evernham Motorsports	19	Jeremy Mayfield	Kenny Francis
Dodge	Penske-Jasper Racing	2	Rusty Wallace	Larry Carter
Dodge	Penske-Jasper Racing	12	Ryan Newman	Matt Borland
Dodge	Penske-Jasper Racing	77	Travis Kvapil (R)	Shane Wilson
Dodge	Petty Enterprises	43	Jeff Green	Greg Steadman
Dodge	Petty Enterprises	45	Kyle Petty	Paul Andrews
Dodge	R&J Racing	37	Kevin Lepage 21	Billy Poindexter
Dodge	R&J Racing	37	Anthony Lazzaro 1	Billy Poindexter
Dodge	R&J Racing	37	Tony Raines 8	Billy Poindexter
Dodge	R&J Racing	37	Mike Garvey 1	Billy Poindexter
Dodge	R&J Racing	37	Jimmy Spencer 1	Billy Poindexter
Dodge	R&J Racing	37	Mike Skinner 4	Billy Poindexter
Ford	Robert Yates Racing	38	Elliott Sadler	Todd Parrott 27; Kevin Buskirk 9
Ford	Robert Yates Racing	88	Dale Jarrett	Mike Ford 11; Bill Wilburn 16; Todd Parrott 9
Ford	Roush Racing	6	Mark Martin	Pat Tryson
Ford	Roush Racing	16	Greg Biffle	Doug Richert
Ford	Roush Racing	17	Matt Kenseth	Robbie Reiser
Ford	Roush Racing	97	Kurt Busch 34	Jimmy Fennig
Ford	Roush Racing	97	Kenny Wallace 2	Jimmy Fennig
Ford	Roush Racing	99	Carl Edwards (R)	Bob Osborne
Ford	Wood Brothers Racing	21	Ricky Rudd	Michael McSwain

=== Limited schedule ===
Manufacturer	Team	No.	Driver(s)	Crew Chief	Rounds
Chevrolet	Braun Racing	08	Shane Hmiel	Keith Montgomery	2
Chevrolet	McGlynn Racing	08	Ryan McGlynn	Keith Montgomery	1
Chevrolet	McGlynn Racing	08	Derrike Cope	Keith Montgomery	1
Chevrolet	Conely Racing	79	Stan Boyd		2
Chevrolet	Conely Racing	79	Derrike Cope		1
Chevrolet	Conely Racing	79	Bryan Reffner		1
Chevrolet	Competitive Edge Motorsports	51	Stuart Kirby	Bob Schacht	10
Chevrolet	Competitive Edge Motorsports	51	Bryan Reffner	Bob Schacht	1
Chevrolet	Competitive Edge Motorsports	51	Mike Garvey	Bob Schacht	1
Chevrolet	Dale Earnhardt, Inc.	1	Martin Truex Jr.	Pete Rondeau	7
Chevrolet	Dale Earnhardt, Inc.	1	Paul Menard	Pete Rondeau	1
Chevrolet	Furniture Row Racing	78	Kenny Wallace	Tim Weiss 1 Joe Garone 1	1
Chevrolet	Furniture Row Racing	78	Jerry Robertson	Tim Weiss 1 Joe Garone 1	1
Chevrolet	Hendrick Motorsports	44	Terry Labonte	Peter Sospenzo	8
Chevrolet	MB Sutton Motorsports	36	Boris Said	Frank Stoddard	12
Chevrolet	Mach 1 Motorsports	34	Randy LaJoie	Mike Steurer	7
Chevrolet	Mach 1 Motorsports	34	Steve Portenga	Mike Steurer	1
Chevrolet	Mach 1 Motorsports	34	Jeff Fuller	Mike Steurer	4
Chevrolet	Mach 1 Motorsports	34	P. J. Jones	Mike Steurer	8
Chevrolet	Mach 1 Motorsports	34	Joey McCarthy	Mike Steurer	4
Chevrolet	Mach 1 Motorsports	34	Ted Christopher	Mike Steurer	1
Chevrolet	Mach 1 Motorsports	34	Eric McClure (R)	Mike Steurer	1
Chevrolet	Mach 1 Motorsports	34	Chad Chaffin	Mike Steurer	1
Chevrolet	NEMCO Motorsports	87	Chris Cook	Gary Putnam	2
Chevrolet	Raabe Racing Enterprises	73	Eric McClure (R)	Tim Brewer	3
Chevrolet	Richard Childress Racing	33	Kerry Earnhardt	Gil Martin	4
Chevrolet	Richard Childress Racing	33	Clint Bowyer	Gil Martin	1
Chevrolet	Richard Childress Racing	33	Brian Simo	Gil Martin	1
Chevrolet	Stanton Barrett Motorsports	95	Stanton Barrett	David Ifft 4 Mike Dayton 3	7
Chevrolet	S.W.A.T. Racing	55	Derrike Cope		1
Dodge	Arnold Motorsports	50	Jimmy Spencer	Buddy Sisco	12
Dodge	Arnold Motorsports	50	Jorge Goeters	Buddy Sisco	1
Dodge	Bill Davis Racing	23	Mike Skinner	Doug Wolcott	6
Dodge	Bill Davis Racing	23	Johnny Benson	Doug Wolcott	1
Dodge	Bobby Hamilton Racing	04	Bobby Hamilton	Danny Rollins	2
Dodge	Buddy Sisco Racing	61	Jeff Fuller		1
Dodge	Buddy Sisco Racing	61	Tony Raines		1
Dodge	Buddy Sisco Racing	61	Wayne Anderson		2
Dodge	Chip Ganassi Racing with Felix Sabates	39	Bill Elliott	Lee McCall	1
Dodge	Chip Ganassi Racing with Felix Sabates	39	Scott Pruett	Lee McCall	2
Dodge	Chip Ganassi Racing with Felix Sabates	39	David Stremme	Lee McCall	4
Dodge	Chip Ganassi Racing with Felix Sabates	39	Reed Sorenson	Lee McCall	2
Dodge	Evernham Motorsports	91	Bill Elliott	Chris Andrews	9
Dodge	GIC-Mixon Motorsports	93	Geoff Bodine	Lee McCall	1
Dodge	Phoenix Racing	09	Johnny Sauter	Tony Liberati 6 Ralph Wingfield 10; Marc Reno 3 Joe Shear Jr. 1	18
Dodge	Phoenix Racing	09	Bobby Hamilton	Tony Liberati 6 Ralph Wingfield 10; Marc Reno 3 Joe Shear Jr. 1	1
Dodge	Phoenix Racing	09	Reed Sorenson	Tony Liberati 6 Ralph Wingfield 10; Marc Reno 3 Joe Shear Jr. 1	1
Dodge	Rick Ware Racing	52	Larry Gunselman	Rick Ware	1
Dodge	Rick Ware Racing	52	Derrike Cope	Rick Ware	2
Dodge	Rick Ware Racing	52	José Luis Ramírez	Rick Ware	1
Dodge	Sacks Motorsports	13	Greg Sacks	Paul Sacks	7
Dodge	Shepherd Racing Ventures	89	Morgan Shepherd	Troy Kelly	20
Dodge	Shepherd Racing Ventures	89	Jason Jarrett	Troy Kelly	1
Dodge	Zero Four Motorsports	75	Wayne Anderson	Barry Haefele	6
Dodge	Zero Four Motorsports	75	Mike Garvey	Barry Haefele	6
Ford	Kirk Shelmerdine Racing	27	Kirk Shelmerdine	Phil Harris	12
Ford	Kirk Shelmerdine Racing	27	Brad Teague	Phil Harris	1
Ford	Kirk Shelmerdine Racing	27	Tom Hubert	Phil Harris	2
Ford	Kirk Shelmerdine Racing	27	Ted Christopher	Phil Harris	1
Ford	Peak Fitness Racing	66	Hermie Sadler	James Ince	14
Ford	Peak Fitness Racing	66	Mike Garvey	James Ince	11
Ford	Peak Fitness Racing	66	Johnny Borneman III	James Ince	1
Ford	Peak Fitness Racing	66	Jimmy Spencer	James Ince	1
Ford	Peak Fitness Racing	66	Kevin Lepage	James Ince	8
Ford	ppc Racing	14	John Andretti	Dave Charpentier	4
Chevrolet Dodge Ford	Michael Waltrip Racing	00	David Reutimann	Gere Kennon 5 Dom Turse 20; Ryan McGlynn 1 Jeff Spraker 1 Terry Wooten 1 Dennis Fieble 1 Butch Hylton 1	1
Chevrolet Dodge Ford	Michael Waltrip Racing	00	Johnny Benson	Gere Kennon 5 Dom Turse 20; Ryan McGlynn 1 Jeff Spraker 1 Terry Wooten 1 Dennis Fieble 1 Butch Hylton 1	2
Chevrolet Dodge Ford	Michael Waltrip Racing	00	Kenny Wallace	Gere Kennon 5 Dom Turse 20; Ryan McGlynn 1 Jeff Spraker 1 Terry Wooten 1 Dennis Fieble 1 Butch Hylton 1	4
Chevrolet Dodge Ford	Bill Davis Racing	00	Kenny Wallace	Gere Kennon 5 Dom Turse 20; Ryan McGlynn 1 Jeff Spraker 1 Terry Wooten 1 Dennis Fieble 1 Butch Hylton 1	1
Chevrolet Dodge Ford	Mach 1 Motorsports	00	Mike Skinner	Gere Kennon 5 Dom Turse 20; Ryan McGlynn 1 Jeff Spraker 1 Terry Wooten 1 Dennis Fieble 1 Butch Hylton 1	1
Chevrolet Dodge Ford	McGlynn Racing	00	Carl Long	Gere Kennon 5 Dom Turse 20; Ryan McGlynn 1 Jeff Spraker 1 Terry Wooten 1 Dennis Fieble 1 Butch Hylton 1	19
Chevrolet Dodge Ford	McGlynn Racing	00	Derrike Cope	Gere Kennon 5 Dom Turse 20; Ryan McGlynn 1 Jeff Spraker 1 Terry Wooten 1 Dennis Fieble 1 Butch Hylton 1	2
Chevrolet Dodge Ford	McGlynn Racing	80	Carl Long	Stan Hover 2 Dom Turse 3 Dennis Fieble 1	4
Chevrolet Dodge Ford	Hover Motorsports	80	Carl Long	Stan Hover 2 Dom Turse 3 Dennis Fieble 1	1
Chevrolet Dodge Ford	Hover Motorsports	80	Andy Belmont	Stan Hover 2 Dom Turse 3 Dennis Fieble 1	1
Chevrolet Dodge Ford	Joe Gibbs Racing	80	J. J. Yeley	Stan Hover 2 Dom Turse 3 Dennis Fieble 1	1
Dodge Ford	Ash Motorsports	02	Brandon Ash	Ed Ash	4

=== Driver changes ===
- Mike Bliss drove full-time with Haas CNC Racing after competing in the final two races for Haas in 2004.
- Robby Gordon left Richard Childress Racing to drive for his own team Robby Gordon Motorsports.
- Jeff Burton moved over to the No. 31 after competing in the last fourteen races in the No. 30 for Richard Childress Racing.
- Travis Kvapil drove full-time with Penske-Jasper Racing after driving their R&D car in four of the last five races in 2004.
- Kyle Busch and Terry Labonte swapped seats with Hendrick Motorsports. Busch drove the No. 5 and Labonte drove the No. 44 R&D car on a part-time schedule.
- Jason Leffler joined Joe Gibbs Racing in 2005.
- Mike Wallace drove full-time with Morgan-McClure Motorsports after competing in the final two races for them in 2004.
- Dave Blaney moved over to the No. 07 after competing in eight races in the No. 30 for Richard Childress Racing in 2004.
- Bobby Hamilton Jr. drove full-time with PPI Motorsports after competing in eleven races in 2004.

=== Team changes ===
- Front Row Motorsports will run a full-time schedule as the No. 92.
- Kirk Shelmerdine Racing will run a part-time schedule.
- Michael Waltrip Racing, Bill Davis Racing, Mach 1 Motorsports and McGlynn Racing formed an alliance to run the No. 00.
- MB Sutton Motorsports ran the No. 36 rather than MB2 Motorsports.
- R&J Racing will run a full-time schedule as the No. 37.

== Schedule ==
No.	Race title	Track	Date
	Budweiser Shootout	Daytona International Speedway, Daytona Beach	February 12
	Gatorade Duel	Daytona International Speedway, Daytona Beach	February 17
1	Daytona 500	Daytona International Speedway, Daytona Beach	February 20
2	Auto Club 500	California Speedway, Fontana	February 27
3	UAW-DaimlerChrysler 400	Las Vegas Motor Speedway, Las Vegas, Nevada	March 13
4	Golden Corral 500	Atlanta Motor Speedway, Hampton	March 20
5	Food City 500	Bristol Motor Speedway, Bristol	April 3
6	Advance Auto Parts 500	Martinsville Speedway, Ridgeway	April 10
7	Samsung/Radio Shack 500	Texas Motor Speedway, Fort Worth	April 17
8	Subway Fresh 500	Phoenix International Raceway, Phoenix	April 23
9	Aaron's 499	Talladega Superspeedway, Talladega	May 1
10	Dodge Charger 500	Darlington Raceway, Darlington	May 7
11	Chevy American Revolution 400	Richmond International Raceway, Richmond	May 14
	Nextel Open	Lowe's Motor Speedway, Concord	May 21
	Nextel All-Star Challenge	Lowe's Motor Speedway, Concord	May 21
12	Coca-Cola 600	Lowe's Motor Speedway, Concord	May 29
13	MBNA RacePoints 400	Dover International Speedway, Dover	June 5
14	Pocono 500	Pocono Raceway, Long Pond	June 12
15	Batman Begins 400	Michigan International Speedway, Brooklyn	June 19
16	Dodge/Save Mart 350	Infineon Raceway, Sonoma	June 26
17	Pepsi 400	Daytona International Speedway, Daytona Beach	July 2
18	USG Sheetrock 400	Chicagoland Speedway, Joliet	July 10
19	New England 300	New Hampshire International Speedway, Loudon	July 17
20	Pennsylvania 500	Pocono Raceway, Long Pond	July 24
21	Allstate 400 at the Brickyard	Indianapolis Motor Speedway, Speedway	August 7
22	Sirius Satellite Radio at The Glen	Watkins Glen International, Watkins Glen	August 14
23	GFS Marketplace 400	Michigan International Speedway, Brooklyn	August 21
24	Sharpie 500	Bristol Motor Speedway, Bristol	August 27
25	Sony HD 500	California Speedway, Fontana	September 4
26	Chevy Rock & Roll 400	Richmond International Raceway, Richmond	September 10
Chase for the Nextel Cup
27	Sylvania 300	New Hampshire International Speedway, Loudon	September 18
28	MBNA NASCAR RacePoints 400	Dover International Speedway, Dover	September 25
29	UAW-Ford 500	Talladega Superspeedway, Talladega	October 2
30	Banquet 400 presented by ConAgra Foods	Kansas Speedway, Kansas City	October 9
31	UAW-GM Quality 500	Lowe's Motor Speedway, Concord	October 15
32	Subway 500	Martinsville Speedway, Ridgeway	October 23
33	Bass Pro Shops MBNA 500	Atlanta Motor Speedway, Hampton	October 30
34	Dickies 500	Texas Motor Speedway, Fort Worth	November 6
35	Checker Auto Parts 500	Phoenix International Raceway, Phoenix	November 13
36	Ford 400	Homestead–Miami Speedway, Homestead	November 20

== Races ==
No.	Race	Pole position	Most laps led	Winning driver	Manufacturer	Report
	Budweiser Shootout	Dale Jarrett	Greg Biffle	Jimmie Johnson	Chevrolet	Report
	Gatorade Duels	Dale Jarrett	Jeff Gordon	Michael Waltrip	Chevrolet	Report
	Gatorade Duels	Jimmie Johnson	Jimmie Johnson	Tony Stewart	Chevrolet	Report
1	Daytona 500	Dale Jarrett	Tony Stewart	Jeff Gordon	Chevrolet	Report
2	Auto Club 500	Kyle Busch	Joe Nemechek	Greg Biffle	Ford	Report
3	UAW-Daimler Chrysler 400	Ryan Newman	Jimmie Johnson	Jimmie Johnson	Chevrolet	Report
4	Golden Corral 500	Ryan Newman	Jimmie Johnson	Carl Edwards	Ford	Report
5	Food City 500	Elliott Sadler	Rusty Wallace	Kevin Harvick	Chevrolet	Report
6	Advance Auto Parts 500	Scott Riggs	Tony Stewart	Jeff Gordon	Chevrolet	Report
7	Samsung/Radio Shack 500	Ryan Newman	Greg Biffle	Greg Biffle	Ford	Report
8	Subway Fresh 500	Jeff Gordon	Kurt Busch	Kurt Busch	Ford	Report
9	Aaron's 499	Kevin Harvick	Jeff Gordon	Jeff Gordon	Chevrolet	Report
10	Dodge Charger 500	Kasey Kahne	Greg Biffle	Greg Biffle	Ford	Report
11	Chevy American Revolution 400	Kasey Kahne	Kasey Kahne	Kasey Kahne	Dodge	Report
	Nextel Open	Mike Bliss	Mike Bliss	Brian Vickers	Chevrolet	Report
	Nextel All-Star Challenge	Ryan Newman	Ryan Newman	Mark Martin	Ford	Report
12	Coca-Cola 600	Ryan Newman	Brian Vickers	Jimmie Johnson	Chevrolet	Report
13	MBNA RacePoints 400	Jimmie Johnson	Greg Biffle	Greg Biffle	Ford	Report
14	Pocono 500	Michael Waltrip	Brian Vickers	Carl Edwards	Ford	Report
15	Batman Begins 400	Ryan Newman	Tony Stewart	Greg Biffle	Ford	Report
16	Dodge/Save Mart 350	Jeff Gordon	Tony Stewart	Tony Stewart	Chevrolet	Report
17	Pepsi 400	Tony Stewart	Tony Stewart	Tony Stewart	Chevrolet	Report
18	USG Sheetrock 400	Jimmie Johnson	Matt Kenseth	Dale Earnhardt Jr.	Chevrolet	Report
19	New England 300	Brian Vickers	Tony Stewart	Tony Stewart	Chevrolet	Report
20	Pennsylvania 500	Jamie McMurray	Kurt Busch	Kurt Busch	Ford	Report
21	Allstate 400 at the Brickyard	Elliott Sadler	Tony Stewart	Tony Stewart	Chevrolet	Report
22	Sirius Satellite Radio at The Glen	Tony Stewart	Tony Stewart	Tony Stewart	Chevrolet	Report
23	GFS Marketplace 400	Joe Nemechek	Kurt Busch	Jeremy Mayfield	Dodge	Report
24	Sharpie 500	Matt Kenseth	Matt Kenseth	Matt Kenseth	Ford	Report
25	Sony HD 500	Carl Edwards	Kyle Busch	Kyle Busch	Chevrolet	Report
26	Chevy Rock & Roll 400	Kevin Harvick	Kurt Busch	Kurt Busch	Ford	Report
Chase for the Nextel Cup
27	Sylvania 300	Tony Stewart	Tony Stewart	Ryan Newman	Dodge	Report
28	MBNA NASCAR RacePoints 400	Ryan Newman	Kurt Busch	Jimmie Johnson	Chevrolet	Report
29	UAW-Ford 500	Elliott Sadler	Tony Stewart	Dale Jarrett	Ford	Report
30	Banquet 400 presented by ConAgra Foods	Matt Kenseth	Mark Martin	Mark Martin	Ford	Report
31	UAW-GM Quality 500	Elliott Sadler	Elliott Sadler	Jimmie Johnson	Chevrolet	Report
32	Subway 500	Tony Stewart	Tony Stewart	Jeff Gordon	Chevrolet	Report
33	Bass Pro Shops MBNA 500	Ryan Newman	Dale Earnhardt Jr.	Carl Edwards	Ford	Report
34	Dickies 500	Ryan Newman	Matt Kenseth	Carl Edwards	Ford	Report
35	Checker Auto Parts 500	Denny Hamlin	Greg Biffle	Kyle Busch	Chevrolet	Report
36	Ford 400	Carl Edwards	Carl Edwards	Greg Biffle	Ford	Report

=== Budweiser Shootout ===
The Budweiser Shootout was held on February 12, the Daytona International Speedway. The starting lineup was decided by a random draw. Dale Jarrett drew the pole.

Top Ten Results

1. #48 - Jimmie Johnson
2. #12 - Ryan Newman
3. #24 - Jeff Gordon
4. #20 - Tony Stewart
5. #16 - Greg Biffle
6. #97 - Kurt Busch
7. #8 - Dale Earnhardt Jr.
8. #6 - Mark Martin
9. #9 - Kasey Kahne
10. #18 - Bobby Labonte

=== Gatorade 125s ===
The Gatorade 125-mile qualifying races for the Daytona 500 were held on February 17.

Race One Top Ten

1. #15 - Michael Waltrip
2. #8 - Dale Earnhardt Jr.
3. #23 - Mike Skinner
4. #12 - Ryan Newman
5. #21 - Ricky Rudd
6. #97 - Kurt Busch
7. #24 - Jeff Gordon
8. #42 - Jamie McMurray
9. #5 - Kyle Busch
10. #00 - Kenny Wallace*
- Kenny Wallace beat Kerry Earnhardt by 0.009 seconds to score the 2nd and final transfer spot into the Daytona 500.

Race Two Top Ten

1. #20 - Tony Stewart
2. #31 - Jeff Burton
3. #37 - Kevin Lepage
4. #1 - Martin Truex Jr.
5. #10 - Scott Riggs
6. #17 - Matt Kenseth
7. #7 - Robby Gordon
8. #22 - Scott Wimmer
9. #40 - Sterling Marlin
10. #36 - Boris Said

=== 47th Daytona 500 ===
The 47th running of the Daytona 500 was run on Sunday, February 20. Dale Jarrett won the pole for the race.

Top 10 Results

1. #24 - Jeff Gordon
2. #97 - Kurt Busch
3. #8 - Dale Earnhardt Jr.
4. #10 - Scott Riggs
5. #48 - Jimmie Johnson
6. #6 - Mark Martin
7. #20 - Tony Stewart
8. #40 - Sterling Marlin
9. #37 - Kevin Lepage
10. #2 - Rusty Wallace

Failed to qualify: Robby Gordon (#7), Kerry Earnhardt (#33), Derrike Cope (#55), Eric McClure (#73), Stanton Barrett (#92), Larry Gunselman (#52), Johnny Sauter (#09), Hermie Sadler (#66), Andy Belmont (#80), Randy LaJoie (#34), Kirk Shelmerdine (#27), Greg Sacks (#13), Geoff Bodine (#93)

=== Auto Club 500 ===
The Auto Club 500 was run on Sunday, February 27 at California Speedway. Kyle Busch won the pole.

Top Ten Results

1. #16 - Greg Biffle
2. #48 - Jimmie Johnson
3. #97 - Kurt Busch
4. #42 - Jamie McMurray
5. #99 - Carl Edwards
6. #29 - Kevin Harvick
7. #6 - Mark Martin
8. #38 - Elliott Sadler
9. #12 - Ryan Newman
10. #2 - Rusty Wallace

Failed to qualify: Stanton Barrett (#92), Hermie Sadler (#66), Stan Boyd (#79), Eric McClure (#73), Kirk Shelmerdine (#27)

=== UAW-DaimlerChrysler 400 ===
The UAW-DaimlerChrysler 400 was run on Sunday, March 13 at Las Vegas Motor Speedway. Ryan Newman won the pole.

Top Ten Results

1. #48 - Jimmie Johnson
2. #5 - Kyle Busch
3. #97 - Kurt Busch
4. #24 - Jeff Gordon
5. #29 - Kevin Harvick
6. #16 - Greg Biffle
7. #41 - Casey Mears
8. #17 - Matt Kenseth
9. #12 - Ryan Newman
10. #20 - Tony Stewart

Failed to qualify: Johnny Sauter (#09), Kevin Lepage (#37), Stanton Barrett (#92), Stan Boyd (#79), Carl Long (#00), Kirk Shelmerdine (#27)

=== Golden Corral 500 ===
The Golden Corral 500 was held on March 20 at Atlanta Motor Speedway. Ryan Newman won the pole.

Top Ten Results

1. #99 - Carl Edwards*
2. #48 - Jimmie Johnson
3. #16 - Greg Biffle
4. #6 - Mark Martin
5. #9 - Kasey Kahne
6. #25 - Brian Vickers
7. #15 - Michael Waltrip
8. #07 - Dave Blaney
9. #10 - Scott Riggs
10. #38 - Elliott Sadler

Failed to qualify: Randy LaJoie (#34), John Andretti (#14), Stanton Barrett (#92), Carl Long (#00), Kirk Shelmerdine (#27), Hermie Sadler (#66), Morgan Shepherd (#89)

- Carl Edwards edged out Jimmie Johnson by .028 (28 thousandths) of a second to score first career Cup Series victory. This also comes after scoring his first Busch Series victory the previous day.

=== Food City 500 ===
The Food City 500 was held on April 3 at Bristol Motor Speedway, Elliott Sadler won the pole.

Top Ten Results

1. #29 - Kevin Harvick*
2. #38 - Elliott Sadler
3. #20 - Tony Stewart
4. #8 - Dale Earnhardt Jr.
5. #88 - Dale Jarrett
6. #48 - Jimmie Johnson
7. #77 - Travis Kvapil
8. #45 - Kyle Petty
9. #16 - Greg Biffle
10. #10 - Scott Riggs

Failed to qualify: Johnny Sauter (#09), Kevin Lepage (#37), Robby Gordon (#7), Randy LaJoie (#34), Brad Teague (#27), Jason Jarrett (#89)

- This was Harvick's first Cup Series victory since Indianapolis in July 2003, ending a 55-race winless streak. This was also the first Cup victory for Richard Childress Racing since Watkins Glen in August 2003.
- Kurt Busch was collected in a crash with Jeff Burton and failed to finish, ending his chances of winning a fourth consecutive Bristol spring race.

=== Advance Auto Parts 500 ===
The Advance Auto Parts 500 was held on April 10 at Martinsville. Scott Riggs won the pole.

Top Ten Results

1. #24 - Jeff Gordon*
2. #9 - Kasey Kahne*
3. #6 - Mark Martin
4. #12 - Ryan Newman
5. #2 - Rusty Wallace
6. #40 - Sterling Marlin
7. #21 - Ricky Rudd
8. #48 - Jimmie Johnson
9. #38 - Elliott Sadler
10. #01 - Joe Nemechek

Failed to qualify: Stanton Barrett (#92), Jeff Fuller (#61), Kirk Shelmerdine (#27), Carl Long (#00)

- Gordon's victory is considered one of the greatest comebacks in modern NASCAR history, as he rallied from 3 laps down to win his sixth Martinsville race.
- This was Kahne's sixth 2nd-place finish before winning his first Cup race.

=== Samsung/Radio Shack 500 ===
The Samsung/Radio Shack 500 was held on April 17 at Texas Motor Speedway. Ryan Newman won the pole. Greg Biffle had a dominating performance, leading 219 of 334 laps en route to victory.

Top Ten Results

1. #16 - Greg Biffle
2. #42 - Jamie McMurray
3. #48 - Jimmie Johnson
4. #41 - Casey Mears
5. #40 - Sterling Marlin
6. #15 - Michael Waltrip
7. #97 - Kurt Busch
8. #21 - Ricky Rudd
9. #8 - Dale Earnhardt Jr.
10. #2 - Rusty Wallace

Failed to qualify: Kevin Lepage (#37), Stanton Barrett (#92), Randy LaJoie (#34)

=== Subway Fresh 500 ===
The Subway Fresh 500 was a night race held on April 23 at Phoenix International Raceway. Jeff Gordon won the pole.

Top Ten Results

1. #97 - Kurt Busch
2. #15 - Michael Waltrip
3. #31 - Jeff Burton
4. #8 - Dale Earnhardt Jr.
5. #25 - Brian Vickers
6. #18 - Bobby Labonte
7. #99 - Carl Edwards
8. #5 - Kyle Busch
9. #09 - Johnny Sauter
10. #01 - Joe Nemechek

Failed to qualify: Hermie Sadler (#66), Steve Portenga (#34), Brandon Ash (#02)

- Clint Bowyer made his NASCAR Cup debut in this race, driving the #33 Chevy for Richard Childress Racing. Bowyer started 25th and finished 22nd.

=== Aaron's 499 ===
The Aaron's 499 was held on May 1 at Talladega Superspeedway. Jeff Gordon won his third race of the season leading a dominating 139 of 194 laps for his 72nd career Nextel Cup win.

Top Ten Results

1. #24 - Jeff Gordon
2. #20 - Tony Stewart
3. #15 - Michael Waltrip
4. #19 - Jeremy Mayfield
5. #42 - Jamie McMurray
6. #38 - Elliott Sadler
7. #97 - Kurt Busch
8. #49 - Ken Schrader
9. #88 - Dale Jarrett
10. #31 - Jeff Burton

Failed to qualify: Robby Gordon (#7), Kevin Lepage (#37), Kenny Wallace (#00), Stanton Barrett (#92)

- The "Big One" struck at lap 132, when Jimmie Johnson and Mike Wallace got together. 25 cars were involved, making it one of the largest crashes in modern NASCAR history.

=== Dodge Charger 500 ===
The Dodge Charger 500 was held on May 7 at Darlington Raceway. Kasey Kahne won the pole.

Top Ten Results

1. #16 - Greg Biffle
2. #24 - Jeff Gordon
3. #9 - Kasey Kahne
4. #6 - Mark Martin
5. #12 - Ryan Newman
6. #42 - Jamie McMurray
7. #48 - Jimmie Johnson
8. #8 - Dale Earnhardt Jr.
9. #99 - Carl Edwards
10. #20 - Tony Stewart

Failed to qualify: Johnny Sauter (#09), Robby Gordon (#7), Tony Raines (#61), Morgan Shepherd (#89)

=== Chevy American Revolution 400 ===
The Chevy American Revolution 400 was held on May 14 at Richmond International Raceway.

Top Ten Results

1. #9 - Kasey Kahne*
2. #20 - Tony Stewart
3. #12 - Ryan Newman
4. #5 - Kyle Busch
5. #29 - Kevin Harvick
6. #16 - Greg Biffle
7. #38 - Elliott Sadler
8. #18 - Bobby Labonte
9. #15 - Michael Waltrip
10. #42 - Jamie McMurray

Failed to qualify: Kevin Lepage (#37), Jeff Fuller (#34), Kirk Shelmerdine (#27), Carl Long (#00)

- This was Kahne's first career Cup Series victory, coming after finishing in 2nd six previous times.
- Points leader Jimmie Johnson crashed out on lap 81, finishing 40th and losing valuable ground in the points standings. Teammate Jeff Gordon had similar problems on lap 165 and finished 39th losing second place in the standings to Greg Biffle.

=== Nextel All-Star Challenge ===
The Nextel-All Star Challenge was a non-points night race held on May 21 at Lowe's Motor Speedway. The 90-lap race was divided into three segments with the final paying the most money. Also, the top six finishing cars from the first segment were inverted for the second segment. Mike Bliss won the pole for the Open, and Ryan Newman won the pole for the All-Star Challenge.

The Open ended in controversy. Bliss led the most laps and led to the white flag. In the final turn of the final lap, Vickers went underneath Bliss and made contact, spinning Bliss out. Vickers beat a wrecking Bliss for the win, transferring into the All-Star Race. Despite calls to have Vickers disqualified, the results stood. Martin Truex Jr. won the fan poll to transfer into the All-Star race.

Top Ten Results (Open)

1. #25 - Brian Vickers
2. #0 - Mike Bliss
3. #77 - Travis Kvapil
4. #5 - Kyle Busch
5. #32 - Bobby Hamilton Jr.
6. #41 - Casey Mears
7. #7 - Robby Gordon
8. #21 - Ricky Rudd
9. #49 - Ken Schrader
10. #1 - Martin Truex Jr.

Top Ten Results (All-Star Challenge)

1. #6 - Mark Martin
2. #38 - Elliott Sadler
3. #25 - Brian Vickers
4. #24 - Jeff Gordon
5. #48 - Jimmie Johnson
6. #88 - Dale Jarrett
7. #97 - Kurt Busch
8. #19 - Jeremy Mayfield
9. #18 - Bobby Labonte
10. #8 - Dale Earnhardt Jr.
- About half of the field was taken out of the race at lap 35 when Tony Stewart ran into the back of Joe Nemechek which caused a fight in the infield between Nemechek and Kevin Harvick.

=== Coca-Cola 600 ===
Coca-Cola 600 was a night race held on May 29 at Lowe's Motor Speedway. Ryan Newman won the pole. This race saw a record 22 caution flags, resulting in approximately 5 1/2 hours of racing, Jimmie Johnson passed Bobby Labonte at the start/finish line on the final lap to win his third straight Coca-Cola 600.

Top Ten Results

1. #48 - Jimmie Johnson
2. #18 - Bobby Labonte
3. #99 - Carl Edwards
4. #19 - Jeremy Mayfield
5. #12 - Ryan Newman
6. #16 - Greg Biffle
7. #1 - Martin Truex Jr.
8. #88 - Dale Jarrett
9. #49 - Ken Schrader
10. #2 - Rusty Wallace

Failed to qualify: Jason Leffler (#11), Bobby Hamilton Jr. (#32), Hermie Sadler (#66), Boris Said (#36), Jeff Fuller (#34), Carl Long (#00), Tony Raines (#92), Mike Garvey (#75), Kirk Shelmerdine (#27), Greg Sacks (#13)

=== MBNA RacePoints 400 ===
The MBNA RacePoints 400 was held on June 5 at Dover International Speedway. Qualifying was rained out, so the starting lineup was determined by the point standings. Jimmie Johnson started on the pole.

Top Ten Results

1. #16 - Greg Biffle
2. #5 - Kyle Busch
3. #6 - Mark Martin
4. #48 - Jimmie Johnson
5. #2 - Rusty Wallace
6. #25 - Brian Vickers
7. #17 - Matt Kenseth
8. #12 - Ryan Newman
9. #97 - Kurt Busch
10. #38 - Elliott Sadler

Failed to qualify: Mike Skinner (#23), Kirk Shelmerdine (#27)

- After winning, Biffle famously backed his car into the front stretch wall during his burnout celebration.

=== Pocono 500 ===
The Pocono 500 was held on June 12 at Pocono Raceway. Michael Waltrip won the pole.

Top Ten Results

1. #99 - Carl Edwards
2. #25 - Brian Vickers
3. #01 - Joe Nemechek
4. #5 - Kyle Busch
5. #15 - Michael Waltrip
6. #48 - Jimmie Johnson
7. #6 - Mark Martin
8. #29 - Kevin Harvick
9. #24 - Jeff Gordon
10. #42 - Jamie McMurray

Failed to qualify: Kirk Shelmerdine (#27), P. J. Jones (#34), Hermie Sadler (#80), Carl Long (#00)

=== Batman Begins 400 ===
The Batman Begins 400 was held on June 19 at Michigan International Speedway. Ryan Newman won the pole.

Top Ten Results

1. #16 - Greg Biffle
2. #20 - Tony Stewart
3. #6 - Mark Martin
4. #17 - Matt Kenseth
5. #99 - Carl Edwards
6. #01 - Joe Nemechek
7. #15 - Michael Waltrip
8. #38 - Elliott Sadler
9. #5 - Kyle Busch
10. #2 - Rusty Wallace

Failed to qualify: Eric McClure (#92), Derrike Cope (#79), P. J. Jones (#34), Morgan Shepherd (#89)

=== Dodge/Save Mart 350 ===
The Dodge/Save Mart 350 was held on June 26 at Infineon Raceway. Jeff Gordon won the pole.

Top Ten Results

1. #20 - Tony Stewart
2. #21 - Ricky Rudd
3. #97 - Kurt Busch
4. #2 - Rusty Wallace
5. #88 - Dale Jarrett
6. #38 - Elliott Sadler
7. #19 - Jeremy Mayfield
8. #32 - Ron Fellows
9. #12 - Ryan Newman
10. #33 - Brian Simo

Failed to qualify: Brandon Ash (#02), Kevin Lepage (#37), Stanton Barrett (#92), Johnny Borneman III (#66), José Luis Ramírez (#52)

- During qualifying, Jeff Gordon broke his own qualifying record at the time of 1:15.950.

=== Pepsi 400 ===
The Pepsi 400 was held on July 2 at Daytona International Speedway. Tony Stewart won the pole. After a two and a half-hour rain delay, the Pepsi 400 started under both the green and yellow flags to allow the cars to dry the track where the jet-dryers could not, mostly in the turns close to the wall.

Top Ten Results

1. #20 - Tony Stewart*
2. #42 - Jamie McMurray
3. #8 - Dale Earnhardt Jr.
4. #2 - Rusty Wallace
5. #88 - Dale Jarrett
6. #48 - Jimmie Johnson
7. #24 - Jeff Gordon
8. #4 - Mike Wallace*
9. #17 - Matt Kenseth
10. #49 - Ken Schrader

Failed to qualify: Mike Garvey (#66), Kenny Wallace (#00), Dan Pardus (#73), Morgan Shepherd (#89)

- The race had started at 10:45 pm ET and ended at 1:48 am.
- Tony Stewart dominated the race, leading a record 151 of 160 laps. After the race, Stewart climbed the fence in front of the tri-oval, near the starter's stand.
- Morgan-McClure Motorsports scored its final Cup Series top-10 in this race, with Mike Wallace finishing 8th.

=== USG Sheetrock 400 ===
The USG Sheetrock 400 was held on July 10 at Chicagoland Speedway. Jimmie Johnson won the pole. Matt Kenseth lead 176 of the 267 laps, 66% of the race, but on lap 243, a debris caution brought most of the field, including Kenseth, come to pit road, allowing Scott Wimmer, who did not pit, to take the lead, followed by Earnhardt, and three cars between him and Kenseth. With so few laps left, Kenseth was unable to pass four cars and Earnhardt.

Top Ten Results

1. #8 - Dale Earnhardt Jr.
2. #17 - Matt Kenseth
3. #48 - Jimmie Johnson
4. #25 - Brian Vickers
5. #20 - Tony Stewart
6. #19 - Jeremy Mayfield
7. #21 - Ricky Rudd
8. #97 - Kurt Busch
9. #41 - Casey Mears
10. #6 - Mark Martin

Failed to qualify: Kenny Wallace (#92), Mike Garvey (#66), P. J. Jones (#34), Wayne Anderson (#75)

- Jeff Gordon failed to finish after crashing with Mike Bliss on lap 249. The two of them later got into a fistfight at the airport after the race.

=== New England 300 ===
The New England 300 was held on July 17 at New Hampshire International Speedway. Brian Vickers won the pole. Tony Stewart dominated the race, leading 232 of the 300 laps, on his way to win his third race of the year.

Top Ten Results

1. #20 - Tony Stewart*
2. #97 - Kurt Busch
3. #18 - Bobby Labonte
4. #5 - Kyle Busch
5. #16 - Greg Biffle
6. #9 - Kasey Kahne
7. #12 - Ryan Newman
8. #2 - Rusty Wallace
9. #8 - Dale Earnhardt Jr.
10. #17 - Matt Kenseth

Failed to qualify: Joey McCarthy (#34), Derrike Cope (#52), Wayne Anderson (#75), Hermie Sadler (#92)

- As part of his victory celebration, Stewart again climbed the catch fence up to the flag stand, similar to how he celebrated after the Pepsi 400 two races earlier.

=== Pennsylvania 500 ===
The Pennsylvania 500 was held on July 24 at Pocono Raceway. Jamie McMurray won the pole.

Top Ten Results

1. #97 - Kurt Busch
2. #2 - Rusty Wallace
3. #6 - Mark Martin
4. #99 - Carl Edwards
5. #12 - Ryan Newman
6. #29 - Kevin Harvick
7. #20 - Tony Stewart
8. #18 - Bobby Labonte
9. #0 - Mike Bliss
10. #21 - Ricky Rudd

Failed to qualify: Morgan Shepherd (#89), Hermie Sadler (#92), Carl Long (#00), Derrike Cope (#52)

=== Allstate 400 at the Brickyard ===
The Allstate 400 at the Brickyard was held on August 7 at Indianapolis Motor Speedway. Elliott Sadler won the pole. Tony Stewart won in front of his home state crowd in Indiana.

Top Ten Results

1. #20 - Tony Stewart
2. #9 - Kasey Kahne
3. #25 - Brian Vickers
4. #19 - Jeremy Mayfield
5. #17 - Matt Kenseth
6. #41 - Casey Mears
7. #6 - Mark Martin
8. #24 - Jeff Gordon
9. #40 - Sterling Marlin
10. #5 - Kyle Busch

Failed to qualify: Kevin Lepage (#37), Tony Raines (#92), Mike Garvey (#66), Stuart Kirby (#51), Mike Wallace (#4), P. J. Jones (#34), Morgan Shepherd (#89), Kenny Wallace (#00), Jimmy Spencer (#50)

- In addition to Jimmie Johnson crashing out late, Stewart's victory gave him the Nextel Cup points lead for the first time all season.

=== Sirius Satellite Radio at The Glen ===
The Sirius Satellite Radio at The Glen was held on August 14 at Watkins Glen International. Qualifying was rained out, so the starting lineup was determined by the point standings. Tony Stewart started on the pole. Stewart held off road course ringers Robby Gordon, Boris Said, and Scott Pruett, to win his fifth Cup race in seven races.

Top Ten Results

1. #20 - Tony Stewart
2. #7 - Robby Gordon
3. #36 - Boris Said
4. #40 - Scott Pruett*
5. #48 - Jimmie Johnson
6. #2 - Rusty Wallace
7. #6 - Mark Martin
8. #25 - Brian Vickers
9. #01 - Joe Nemechek
10. #8 - Dale Earnhardt Jr.

Failed to qualify: Scott Pruett (#39), Chris Cook (#87), Tom Hubert (#27)

- Scott Pruett substituted for Sterling Marlin, who was attending his father Coo Coo's funeral.

=== GFS Marketplace 400 ===
The GFS Marketplace 400 was held on August 21 at Michigan International Speedway. Joe Nemechek sat on the pole. As the race neared the end, many drivers were running out of fuel. Some drivers pitted while others risked staying out to try to win. Jeremy Mayfield gambled on fuel mileage, taking the lead in the waning laps to win the race.

Top Ten Results

1. #19 - Jeremy Mayfield*
2. #10 - Scott Riggs*
3. #17 - Matt Kenseth
4. #99 - Carl Edwards
5. #20 - Tony Stewart*
6. #16 - Greg Biffle
7. #97 - Kurt Busch
8. #01 - Joe Nemechek
9. #25 - Brian Vickers
10. #48 - Jimmie Johnson

Failed to qualify: P. J. Jones (#34), Carl Long (#00), Eric McClure (#92), Bryan Reffner (#79), Morgan Shepherd (#89)

- This is Jeremy Mayfield's final Cup Series victory.
- Scott Riggs placed second for his career-best finish. Just days later, it was announced that Riggs and his sponsor Valvoline would be leaving for Evernham Motorsports in 2006.
- Tony Stewart clinched a spot in the "Chase for the Cup" top ten as a result of this race.

=== Sharpie 500 ===
The Sharpie 500 was held on August 27 at Bristol Motor Speedway. Matt Kenseth won from the pole, and led 415 of the 500 laps on his way to victory.

Top Ten Results

1. #17 - Matt Kenseth
2. #31 - Jeff Burton
3. #16 - Greg Biffle*
4. #21 - Ricky Rudd
5. #2 - Rusty Wallace*
6. #24 - Jeff Gordon
7. #0 - Mike Bliss
8. #20 - Tony Stewart
9. #8 - Dale Earnhardt Jr.
10. #97 - Kurt Busch

Failed to qualify: Wayne Anderson (#75), Mike Garvey (#66), Johnny Sauter (#09), Morgan Shepherd (#89), P. J. Jones (#34), Tony Raines (#37)

- Jimmie Johnson, Greg Biffle, and Rusty Wallace clinched spots in the "Chase for the Cup" top ten as a result of this race, with two races until the "chase" is locked in.

=== Sony HD 500 ===
The Sony HD 500 was held on September 4 at California Speedway. Carl Edwards sat on the pole. Kyle Busch would win, becoming the youngest driver ever to win a Cup Series race at the age of 20 years, 4 months, and 2 days.

Top Ten Results

1. #5 - Kyle Busch*
2. #16 - Greg Biffle
3. #25 - Brian Vickers
4. #99 - Carl Edwards
5. #20 - Tony Stewart
6. #9 - Kasey Kahne
7. #17 - Matt Kenseth
8. #42 - Jamie McMurray
9. #21 - Ricky Rudd
10. #01 - Joe Nemechek

Failed to qualify: P. J. Jones (#34), John Andretti (#4)

- This was Kyle Busch's first career Cup Series victory.
- Mark Martin and Kurt Busch clinched spots in the "Chase for the Cup" top ten as a result of this race, with only one race left until the "chase" is locked in.
- Dale Earnhardt Jr. suffered a blown engine with 38 laps to go, ending his chances of entering the Chase.

=== Chevy Rock and Roll 400 ===
The last race before the Chase, the Chevy Rock and Roll 400 was held on September 10 at Richmond International Raceway. Kevin Harvick won the pole. Jamie McMurray entered this race 10th in points, with Ryan Newman, Jeff Gordon, Elliott Sadler, Dale Jarrett, and Kevin Harvick on the outside looking in.

Top Ten Results

1. #97 - Kurt Busch
2. #17 - Matt Kenseth
3. #16 - Greg Biffle
4. #5 - Kyle Busch
5. #2 - Rusty Wallace
6. #19 - Jeremy Mayfield
7. #20 - Tony Stewart
8. #9 - Kasey Kahne
9. #44 - Terry Labonte
10. #29 - Kevin Harvick

Failed to qualify: Wayne Anderson (#75), Stanton Barrett (#95), Carl Long (#00), Hermie Sadler (#92), Morgan Shepherd (#89), Joey McCarthy (#34), Kirk Shelmerdine (#27)

- Jamie McMurray crashed on lap 362 after contact with Tony Raines, ending McMurray's chances to get into the Chase for the Cup.

Making The Chase - This was the final race to determine the contenders for the Chase for the Nextel Cup.

1. #20 - Tony Stewart (3716–5050)
2. #16 - Greg Biffle (3531–5045)
3. #2 - Rusty Wallace (3412–5040)
4. #48 - Jimmie Johnson (3400–5035)
5. #97 - Kurt Busch (3304–5030)
6. #6 - Mark Martin (3273–5025)
7. #19 - Jeremy Mayfield (3228–5020)
8. #99 - Carl Edwards (3114–5015)
9. #17 - Matt Kenseth (3114–5015)
10. #12 - Ryan Newman (3055–5005)

The first number is the number of points on the old system. Following the race, the Chase contenders had their points reset to the second number.

== Chase for the Nextel Cup ==
=== Sylvania 300 ===
The Sylvania 300 was held on September 18 at New Hampshire International Speedway. Tony Stewart sat on the pole and led most of the laps, battling with Ryan Newman in the final laps and ultimately finishing second behind him.

Top Ten Results

1. #12 - Ryan Newman
2. #20 - Tony Stewart
3. #17 - Matt Kenseth
4. #16 - Greg Biffle
5. #8 - Dale Earnhardt Jr.
6. #2 - Rusty Wallace
7. #6 - Mark Martin
8. #48 - Jimmie Johnson
9. #31 - Jeff Burton
10. #29 - Kevin Harvick

Failed to qualify: Carl Long (#00), Morgan Shepherd (#89), Stanton Barrett (#95), Mike Garvey (#66), Tony Raines (#37), Kirk Shelmerdine (#27)

- This race was marred by numerous confrontations and penalties.
  - Kurt Busch was involved in an incident with Scott Riggs early on, leading to a confrontation between Busch and Riggs' crew chief, Rodney Childers on pit road. Busch finished 35th.
  - Kasey Kahne crashed out after contact from Kyle Busch. Kahne maneuvered his wrecked car in front of Busch under caution. Kahne was later fined $25,000, docked 25 points, and was placed on probation for the remainder of the season.
  - Robby Gordon crashed out after contact with Michael Waltrip. On the following caution lap, Gordon tried to ram Waltrip's car with his wrecked car and on the lap after that, Gordon threw his helmet at Waltrip's passing car. In the subsequent live interview on TNT, Gordon called Waltrip a "piece of s**t", and TNT quickly ended the interview. Gordon was later fined $35,000, docked 50 points, and was placed on probation for the remainder of the season for the two incidents. Meanwhile, Waltrip was fined $10,000 and docked 25 points for apparently using an obscene gesture, but Waltrip and DEI contested the fine with NASCAR and it was overturned.
    - In a side note to this incident, Gordon put the helmet up for auction on eBay for the benefit of his race team's sponsor Harrah's relief efforts of Hurricane Katrina, and Waltrip signed the helmet as well. The original auction had to close as bids were reaching as high as $10 million. When the auction reopened, internet gambling site Goldenpalace.com won the helmet, paying $51,100 (US).
  - During the subsequent red flag, NASCAR warned all teams and crew chiefs to restrain themselves from further retributive incidents.

=== MBNA NASCAR RacePoints 400 ===
The MBNA NASCAR RacePoints 400 was held on September 25 at Dover International Speedway. Ryan Newman sat on the pole. Several Chase contenders had tire problems that resulted in poor finishes, including Matt Kenseth (35th), Greg Biffle (13th), and Kurt Busch (23rd), who led the most laps.

Top Ten Results

1. #48 - Jimmie Johnson*
2. #5 - Kyle Busch
3. #2 - Rusty Wallace
4. #6 - Mark Martin
5. #12 - Ryan Newman
6. #38 - Elliott Sadler
7. #19 - Jeremy Mayfield
8. #45 - Kyle Petty
9. #99 - Carl Edwards
10. #41 - Casey Mears

Failed to qualify: Morgan Shepherd (#89), Hermie Sadler (#92), Ryan McGlynn (#08), Joey McCarthy (#34)

- Points leader Tony Stewart had a slow day, finishing 2 laps town in 17th, dropping him to 5th in the standings.
- With the win, Jimmie Johnson moved into the lead in the Chase for the Nextel Cup.
- Furniture Row Racing made its Cup Series debut in this race, with driver Kenny Wallace finishing 34th in the #78 Chevy after starting last.

=== UAW-Ford 500 ===
The UAW-Ford 500 was held on October 2 at Talladega Superspeedway. Elliott Sadler won the pole.

Top Ten Results

1. #88 - Dale Jarrett*
2. #20 - Tony Stewart*
3. #12 - Ryan Newman
4. #99 - Carl Edwards
5. #17 - Matt Kenseth
6. #25 - Brian Vickers
7. #40 - Sterling Marlin
8. #97 - Kurt Busch
9. #01 - Joe Nemechek
10. #29 - Kevin Harvick

Failed to qualify: Bobby Hamilton Jr. (#32), Johnny Sauter (#09), Morgan Shepherd (#89)

- This was Dale Jarrett's final career Cup Series victory, and the final Cup victory for Robert Yates Racing. This was also Jarrett's first victory in a Cup Series points race since Rockingham in February 2003, breaking a 98-race winless streak.
- This was the first time since 2001 that a DEI car would not win a restrictor-plate race at any point in the year. It was also the first time since 1997 that an Earnhardt failed to win a restrictor-plate race at any point in the year.
- This would be the 7th and final career Cup Series start for Kerry Earnhardt. This would also be the only Cup Series race that Kerry finished ahead of his younger brother Dale Jr., with Kerry finishing 39th, and Dale finishing 40th.
- Points leader Jimmie Johnson was involved in several incidents and finished 31st, falling from 1st to 4th in the points standings.
- Tony Stewart's runner-up finish, coupled with Johnson's struggles, allowed Stewart to retake the championship lead, and he would hold it for the rest of the season.
- Parts of the movie Talladega Nights: The Ballad of Ricky Bobby were filmed during this race.

=== Banquet 400 ===
The Banquet 400 was held on October 9 at Kansas Speedway. Matt Kenseth sat on the pole.

Top Ten Results

1. #6 - Mark Martin
2. #16 - Greg Biffle
3. #99 - Carl Edwards
4. #20 - Tony Stewart
5. #17 - Matt Kenseth
6. #48 - Jimmie Johnson
7. #2 - Rusty Wallace
8. #41 - Casey Mears
9. #21 - Ricky Rudd
10. #24 - Jeff Gordon

Failed to qualify: Robby Gordon (#7), Wayne Anderson (#61), Tony Raines (#37), Carl Long (#00), Greg Sacks (#13), Eric McClure (#34)

- This would be Mark Martin's final Cup Series victory with Roush Racing.
- Denny Hamlin made his Cup Series debut in this race, finishing 32nd.
- The top-7 finishers were all Chase for the Nextel Cup drivers.

=== UAW-GM Quality 500 ===
The UAW-GM Quality 500 was held on October 15 at Lowe's Motor Speedway. Elliott Sadler won the pole. When the smoke cleared, Jimmie Johnson won his fourth straight points-paying race at Lowe's and surged into a tie with Tony Stewart for the top of the standings.

Top Ten Results

1. #48 - Jimmie Johnson
2. #97 - Kurt Busch
3. #16 - Greg Biffle
4. #01 - Joe Nemechek
5. #6 - Mark Martin
6. #41 - Casey Mears
7. #12 - Ryan Newman
8. #11 - Denny Hamlin
9. #21 - Ricky Rudd
10. #99 - Carl Edwards

Failed to qualify: Boris Said (#36), Carl Long (#00), Jimmy Spencer (#50), Mike Garvey (#37), P. J. Jones (#92), Stanton Barrett (#95)

- The start of the race was delayed by 45 minutes due the finish of the Southern California-Notre Dame college football game which was being broadcast on NBC.
- The race was marred by multiple tire problems, similar to the 2005 United States Grand Prix. This was caused by a recent repave of the track that involved diamond grinding, and Goodyear failing to bring an adequate tire to the track. Even with drivers driving at 75% speed, tires continued to explode due to excessive heat in the right-front tire. Multiple drivers crashed due to flat tires, including championship leader Tony Stewart. At one point, NASCAR even considered ending the race early, as teams were running out of tires. This race, along with the May race with saw a record 22 cautions, resulted in Lowe's Motor Speedway being repaved a second time in 2006.
- This was Johnson's fourth consecutive victory at Charlotte Motor Speedway, become only the 3rd driver in NASCAR history to win 4 straight races at one track.
- Stewart's issues resulted in him finishing 25th, while Johnson's victory put both of them in a tie for the points lead.

=== Subway 500 ===
The Subway 500 was held on October 23 at Martinsville Speedway. Tony Stewart won the pole.

Top 10 Finishers

1. #24 - Jeff Gordon
2. #20 - Tony Stewart
3. #48 - Jimmie Johnson
4. #18 - Bobby Labonte
5. #97 - Kurt Busch
6. #31 - Jeff Burton
7. #42 - Jamie McMurray
8. #11 - Denny Hamlin
9. #5 - Kyle Busch
10. #12 - Ryan Newman

Failed to qualify: Chad Chaffin (#92), Joey McCarthy (#34), Carl Long (#00), Mike Garvey (#75), Morgan Shepherd (#89), Wayne Anderson (#61)

=== Bass Pro Shops MBNA 500 ===
The Bass Pro Shops MBNA 500 was held October 30 at Atlanta Motor Speedway. Ryan Newman won the pole.

Top Ten Finishers

1. #99 - Carl Edwards
2. #24 - Jeff Gordon
3. #6 - Mark Martin
4. #8 - Dale Earnhardt Jr.
5. #17 - Matt Kenseth
6. #42 - Jamie McMurray
7. #16 - Greg Biffle
8. #31 - Jeff Burton
9. #20 - Tony Stewart
10. #38 - Elliott Sadler

Failed to qualify: J. J. Yeley (#80), Boris Said (#36), Bobby Hamilton Jr. (#32), Johnny Sauter (#09), Robby Gordon (#7), Stuart Kirby (#51), Mike Wallace (#4), Jimmy Spencer (#50), Mike Garvey (#75), Morgan Shepherd (#89), Shane Hall (#96)

- Bobby Hamilton made his last career Cup Series start in this race, starting 30th and finishing 26th.

=== Dickies 500 ===
The inaugural Dickies 500 was held November 6 at Texas Motor Speedway. Ryan Newman won the pole.

Top Ten Finishers

1. #99 - Carl Edwards
2. #6 - Mark Martin
3. #17 - Matt Kenseth
4. #41 - Casey Mears
5. #48 - Jimmie Johnson
6. #20 - Tony Stewart
7. #11 - Denny Hamlin
8. #8 - Dale Earnhardt Jr.
9. #38 - Elliott Sadler
10. #97 - Kurt Busch*

Failed to qualify: Reed Sorenson (#39), Stuart Kirby (#51), P. J. Jones (#92), Johnny Sauter (#09), Robby Gordon (#7), Carl Long (#00)

- This was Kurt Busch's last start for Roush Racing.

=== Checker Auto Parts 500 ===
The Checker Auto Parts 500 was held November 13 at Phoenix International Raceway. Denny Hamlin won the pole. The race was surrounded by controversy when defending champion Kurt Busch was cited for reckless driving and was reported by a cop to have "had the whiff of alcohol", although he was below the legal limit of .08 in Arizona when it was discovered Kurt Busch actually had .18 in alcohol. Due to his actions, he was suspended by Roush Racing for the rest of the season, and Kenny Wallace took the wheel of the #97 car. In victory lane, his brother Kyle Busch criticized the media for their handling of the case.

Top Ten Finishers

1. #5 - Kyle Busch
2. #16 - Greg Biffle
3. #24 - Jeff Gordon
4. #20 - Tony Stewart
5. #18 - Bobby Labonte
6. #99 - Carl Edwards
7. #48 - Jimmie Johnson
8. #7 - Robby Gordon
9. #88 - Dale Jarrett
10. #77 - Travis Kvapil

Failed to qualify: Brandon Ash (#02), Bryan Reffner (#51), Mike Wallace (#4), Kevin Lepage (#66), Derrike Cope (#00), P. J. Jones (#92), Morgan Shepherd (#89)

- Tony Stewart left this race with a 52-point lead over Jimmie Johnson.

=== Ford 400 ===
The Ford 400 was held November 20 at Homestead–Miami Speedway. Carl Edwards won the pole. Tony Stewart entered this race with the points lead, with Edwards, Greg Biffle, and Jimmie Johnson each having a mathematical chance to overtake him. Johnson's championship hopes ended after crashing out at Lap 127 with a blown tire. Despite Biffle and Edwards finishing 1st and 4th, it wasn't enough to beat Stewart who, despite finishing 15th, clinched the 2005 Nextel Cup Series championship by 35 points ahead of Biffle and Edwards, who tied for second.

Top Ten Finishers

1. #16 - Greg Biffle
2. #6 - Mark Martin
3. #17 - Matt Kenseth
4. #99 - Carl Edwards
5. #41 - Casey Mears
6. #07 - Dave Blaney
7. #12 - Ryan Newman
8. #29 - Kevin Harvick
9. #24 - Jeff Gordon
10. #19 - Jeremy Mayfield

Failed to qualify: Chad Chaffin (#92), Mike Garvey (#51), Derrike Cope (#00), Morgan Shepherd (#89), Carl Long (#80)

- Under a non-Chase system, Tony Stewart would have been champion regardless. He would have scored a total of 5,174 points in 36 races, winning the title by 220 points over Greg Biffle, who would have finished 2nd in points regardless as well.
- Roush Racing swept the top-4 finishing positions, becoming the first team to accomplish this feat since 1957, and the last until 2021.
- This was Rusty Wallace's final career NASCAR start, retiring with 55 wins, 36 poles, 202 top 5s, 349 top 10s, and the 1989 Winston Cup Series Championship.
- This was Ricky Rudd's final start before stepping away from racing for 2006, ending a streak of 788 consecutive Cup Series starts dating back to 1980, a record that would stand until 2015. Rudd would return to driving at Dover in May 2006 to serve as a relief driver for Tony Stewart, before returning to full-time racing in 2007.

== Full Drivers' Championship ==
(key) Bold - Pole position awarded by time. Italics - Pole position set by owner's points standings. * – Most laps led.

Pos.	Driver	DAY	CAL	LVS	ATL	BRI	MAR	TEX	PHO	TAL	DAR	RCH	CLT	DOV	POC	MCH	SON	DAY	CHI	NHA	POC	IND	GLN	MCH	BRI	CAL	RCH	NHA	DOV	TAL	KAN	CLT	MAR	ATL	TEX	PHO	HOM	Pts.
1	Tony Stewart	7*	17	10	17	3	26*	31	33	2	10	2	24	15	29	2*	**1***	**1***	5	**1***	7	1*	**1***	5	8	5	7	2*	18	2*	4	25	**2***	9	6	4	15	6533
2	Greg Biffle	25	1	6	3	9	29	1*	41	13	1*	6	6	1*	30	1	14	36	11	5	17	21	38	6	3	2	3	4	13	27	2	3	20	7	20	2*	1	6498
3	Carl Edwards	12	5	14	1	26	38	19	7	32	9	21	3	16	1	5	38	33	39	12	4	12	19	4	24	**4**	21	19	9	5	3	10	26	1*	1	6	**4***	6498
4	Mark Martin	6	7	30	4	31	3	20	16	33	4	15	28	3	7	3	15	39	10	15	3	7	7	17	16	11	13	7	4	41	1*	5	34	3	2	14	2	6428
5	Jimmie Johnson	5	2	1*	2*	6	8	3	15	20	7	40	1	4	6	19	36	6	**3**	13	12	38	5	10	36	16	25	8	1*	31	6	1	3	16	5	7	40	6406
6	Ryan Newman	20	9	**9**	**14**	30	4	**16**	14	39	5	3	**5**	8	34	**15**	9	14	29	7	5	34	30	12	39	18	12	1	**5**	4	23	7	10	**23**	**25**	12	7	6359
7	Matt Kenseth	42	26	8	31	16	11	18	42	11	26	12	37	7	32	4	11	9	2*	10	36	5	18	3	**1***	7	2	3	35	3	**5**	26	12	5	3*	32	3	6352
8	Rusty Wallace	10	10	12	27	13*	5	10	36	22	12	19	10	5	11	10	4	4	12	8	2	25	6	13	5	15	5	6	3	25	7	24	19	37	22	29	13	6140
9	Jeremy Mayfield	23	28	20	13	17	15	11	13	4	33	13	4	14	14	22	7	12	6	19	18	4	11	1	18	26	6	16	7	14	16	11	28	38	35	24	10	6073
10	Kurt Busch	2	3	3	32	35	19	7	1*	7	37	17	43	9	22	12	3	37	8	2	1*	18	39	7*	10	12	1*	35	23*	8	14	2	6	36	10	QL^{†}		5974
Chase for the Nextel Cup cut-off
Pos.	Driver	DAY	CAL	LVS	ATL	BRI	MAR	TEX	PHO	TAL	DAR	RCH	CLT	DOV	POC	MCH	SON	DAY	CHI	NHA	POC	IND	GLN	MCH	BRI	CAL	RCH	NHA	DOV	TAL	KAN	CLT	MAR	ATL	TEX	PHO	HOM	Pts.
11	Jeff Gordon	1	30	4	39	15	1	15	**12**	1*	2	39	30	39	9	32	**33**	7	33	25	13	8	14	15	6	21	30	14	37	37	10	38	1	2	14	3	9	4174
12	Jamie McMurray	32	4	15	11	24	25	2	25	5	6	10	21	26	10	13	13	2	22	40	**11**	17	13	20	26	8	40	12	29	12	18	31	7	6	11	18	18	4130
13	Elliott Sadler	11	8	29	10	**2**	9	28	11	6	20	7	13	10	21	8	6	21	37	39	16	**32**	12	39	13	17	17	30	6	**34**	12	**27***	29	10	9	11	23	4084
14	Kevin Harvick	28	6	5	21	1	32	13	19	**12**	14	5	14	25	8	25	37	24	19	22	6	19	15	22	37	14	**10**	10	19	10	24	28	15	22	16	23	8	4072
15	Dale Jarrett	**15**	11	18	23	5	14	14	23	9	15	34	8	23	13	24	5	5	18	16	15	14	22	34	31	24	39	18	15	1	38	30	31	14	12	9	17	3960
16	Joe Nemechek	13	39*	19	35	33	10	17	10	31	11	18	18	27	3	6	23	15	15	18	22	28	9	**8**	12	10	26	25	17	9	20	4	23	18	37	17	24	3953
17	Brian Vickers	21	21	43	6	12	35	34	5	37	16	32	31*	6	2*	41	34	29	4	**11**	14	3	8	9	20	3	37	13	14	6	11	12	36	15	19	26	43	3847
18	Jeff Burton	29	19	17	15	36	16	12	3	10	21	16	22	12	19	11	30	11	30	14	37	20	43	26	2	35	18	9	11	35	28	14	5	8	30	15	25	3803
19	Dale Earnhardt Jr.	3	32	42	24	4	13	9	4	15	8	14	33	22	33	17	42	3	1	9	32	43	10	18	9	38	20	5	31	40	34	42	18	4*	8	40	19	3780
20	Kyle Busch **(R)**	38	**23**	2	12	28	39	21	8	41	23	4	25	2	4	9	40	31	14	4	39	10	33	43	33	1*	4	27	2	33	21	39	9	12	40	1	41	3753
21	Ricky Rudd	24	41	37	33	25	7	8	34	30	13	11	35	40	28	33	2	13	7	23	10	41	16	19	4	9	38	20	12	18	9	9	11	17	13	20	37	3667
22	Casey Mears	26	22	7	19	43	17	4	39	14	39	28	34	24	18	21	20	43	9	33	21	6	23	14	34	32	23	23	10	38	8	6	22	21	4	22	5	3637
23	Kasey Kahne	22	40	38	5	14	2	35	17	24	**3**	**1***	26	35	27	18	41	16	41	6	27	2	17	29	42	6	8	38	16	13	19	23	17	35	42	27	16	3611
24	Bobby Labonte	43	13	41	37	22	33	38	6	23	17	8	2	38	26	14	18	35	13	3	8	40	36	16	21	20	22	24	32	11	39	18	4	31	26	5	34	3488
25	Michael Waltrip	37	38	21	7	19	30	6	2	3	34	9	36	13	**5**	7	22	40	36	17	26	16	41	27	15	13	31	15	26	42	40	29	27	11	41	33	29	3452
26	Dave Blaney	14	34	13	8	20	34	26	24	19	29	27	29	36	24	29	19	27	38	20	20	30	34	32	23	22	33	33	20	15	25	13	16	24	28	25	6	3289
27	Kyle Petty	17	18	25	36	8	18	24	31	43	28	33	17	19	41	30	27	19	27	29	30	13	20	33	25	41	27	21	8	24	29	15	14	25	21	19	27	3288
28	Mike Bliss	18	12	16	18	37	36	22	20	36	19	37	15	18	35	27	39	20	34	21	9	11	26	37	7	27	15	36	30	32	15	35	41	13	17	31	12	3262
29	Jeff Green	16	27	23	28	29	22	43	21	25	22	24	11	30	15	38	29	34	24	31	19	15	24	24	22	25	16	17	27	21	26	19	37	29	18	28	30	3241
30	Sterling Marlin	8	15	35	16	11	6	5	26	34	41	23	39	32	16	40	26	22	32	34	28	9		21	29	19	41	11	41	7	13	40	38	20	23	34	26	3183
31	Ken Schrader	39	14	34	26	23	24	23	38	8	18	30	9	37	20	28	35	10	26	26	31	22	32	25	11	29	19	40	28	26	17	34	13	34	29	30	22	3159
32	Scott Wimmer	33	16	27	20	27	31	42	32	38	25	20	23	31	36	16	25	32	17	35	25	26	21	23	14	31	24	26	36	17	27	20	25	27	27	21	11	3122
33	Travis Kvapil **(R)**	19	24	26	42	7	27	30	40	18	35	22	32	17	17	26	21	23	43	27	38	37	40	38	19	33	11	41	21	16	22	17	21	26	24	10	32	3077
34	Scott Riggs	4	33	31	9	10	**21**	32	18	27	36	26	19	11	37	23	24	41	23	32	33	35	31	2	40	36	29	28	24	36	30	33	24	33	34	38	38	2965
35	Mike Wallace	41	25	24	40	34	23	25	27	28	24	29	16	28	31	43	QL^{₪}	8	25	38	29	DNQ			17		14	22	22	19	35	43	35	DNQ	36	DNQ		2269
36	Bobby Hamilton Jr.	35	20	11	38	39	40	39	35	40	30	36	DNQ	21	23	31		38	21	28	23	39		35	35	23	43	29	33	20	43	41	30	39	38	35	36	2183
37	Robby Gordon	DNQ	35	39	34	DNQ	20	37	37	DNQ	DNQ	31	27	29	39	39	16	26	35	30	40	24	2	30	38	34	35	37	39	23	DNQ	32	42	DNQ	DNQ	8	14	2142
38	Jason Leffler	36	37	22	25	38	12	36	29	26	38	25	DNQ	20	40	20		18	20	24	24	33																1538
39	Kevin Lepage	9	31	DNQ	30	DNQ	28	DNQ	28	DNQ	32	DNQ	12	33	38	37	DNQ	25	28	37	35	DNQ							40	30	36	21		42	33	DNQ	35	1460
40	Terry Labonte		36			18		40					38		12		12		42			36	37	40	27		9				33				31			1071
41	Denny Hamlin																														32	8	8	19	7	**13**	33	806
42	Boris Said	27						27		35			DNQ				17	28				31	3			30					31	DNQ		DNQ				791
43	Johnny Sauter	DNQ		DNQ		DNQ	41	41	9	16	DNQ	41	40					17							DNQ		28			DNQ		16		DNQ	DNQ	39		722
44	Hermie Sadler	DNQ	DNQ	33	DNQ	32	37	29	DNQ	29	40	38	DNQ	41	DNQ			30		DNQ	DNQ				30	42	DNQ		DNQ	QL^{‡}		Wth	32					717
45	Bill Elliott		43		22			33					20			35						23		11		40									32			695
46	Jimmy Spencer				29	21							42									DNQ		36	28		36	39				DNQ	40	DNQ	39	36	31	667
47	Martin Truex Jr.	34								29			7									42								28				40	15			589
48	Mike Garvey **(R)**				41	Wth	43					43	DNQ		25	36		DNQ	DNQ	36	34	DNQ			DNQ	37	32	DNQ				DNQ	DNQ	DNQ	Wth		DNQ	491
49	Mike Skinner	30								42			41	DNQ		34						29								43				43	43	37	39	487
50	Tony Raines										DNQ	35	DNQ									DNQ		31	DNQ	28	34	DNQ	38	22	DNQ							419
51	Stanton Barrett **(R)**	DNQ	DNQ	DNQ	DNQ	41	DNQ	DNQ	30	DNQ	31			34			DNQ								DNQ		DNQ	DNQ	43			DNQ	43			42		389
52	Kenny Wallace	40								DNQ	27							DNQ	DNQ			DNQ							34		Wth					16	21	376
53	Carl Long			DNQ	DNQ	42	DNQ		43		42	DNQ	DNQ	42	DNQ	Wth			40	43	DNQ	Wth		DNQ	32		DNQ	DNQ	42		DNQ	DNQ	DNQ	32	DNQ		DNQ	356
54	Stuart Kirby															42			31			DNQ		41		43		32			37	37		DNQ	DNQ			352
55	John Andretti	31	29	28	DNQ	Wth																		28		DNQ												304
56	J. J. Yeley																		QL^{¿}							39		34	25	29				DNQ				276
57	David Stremme																		16				QL^{¶}				42					36					42	244
58	Scott Pruett																31						4															230
59	Ron Fellows																8						25															230
60	Bobby Hamilton																					27										39	30					201
61	Kerry Earnhardt	DNQ								19								42												39								195
62	P. J. Jones														DNQ	DNQ	32		DNQ		41	DNQ	42	DNQ	DNQ	DNQ					41	DNQ			DNQ	DNQ		189
63	Morgan Shepherd	DNQ	Wth	40	DNQ		Wth				DNQ	42			42	DNQ		Wth		41	DNQ	DNQ	Wth	DNQ	DNQ		DNQ	DNQ	DNQ	DNQ			DNQ	DNQ		DNQ	DNQ	162
64	Johnny Benson																							42	43									28				150
65	Brian Simo																10																					134
66	Randy LaJoie	DNQ	42	36	DNQ	DNQ	42	DNQ																														134
67	Reed Sorenson																																	41	DNQ		28	119
68	Todd Bodine																																				20	103
69	Clint Bowyer								22																													97
70	David Reutimann																															22						97
71	Paul Menard																						27														QL^{¡}	82
72	Chris Cook																28						DNQ															79
73	Anthony Lazzaro																						28															79
74	Shane Hmiel				43	40					Wth																											77
75	Johnny Miller																						29															76
76	Ted Christopher																			42								42										74
77	Joey McCarthy																			DNQ							DNQ	31	DNQ				DNQ					70
78	Jeff Fuller						DNQ				43	DNQ	DNQ	43																								68
79	Greg Sacks	DNQ									DNQ		DNQ		43						43			Wth							DNQ							68
80	Eric McClure **(R)**	DNQ	DNQ	32												DNQ								DNQ							DNQ							67
81	Derrike Cope	DNQ														DNQ				DNQ	DNQ												32			DNQ	DNQ	64
82	Jorge Goeters																						35															63
83	Jerry Robertson																																			41		40
84	Kirk Shelmerdine	DNQ	DNQ	DNQ	DNQ		DNQ					DNQ	DNQ	DNQ	DNQ						42						DNQ	DNQ										37
85	Brandon Ash								DNQ							DNQ															42					DNQ		37
86	Tom Hubert																43						DNQ															34
87	Wayne Anderson																		DNQ	DNQ					DNQ		DNQ	43	DNQ		DNQ		DNQ					34
88	Chad Chaffin																																DNQ	QL^{¥}		43	DNQ	34
89	Larry Gunselman	DNQ																																				
90	Andy Belmont	DNQ																																				
91	Geoff Bodine	DNQ																																				
92	Stan Boyd		DNQ	DNQ																															Wth			
93	Brad Teague					DNQ																																
94	Steve Portenga								DNQ																													
95	Johnny Borneman III																DNQ																					
96	José Luis Ramírez																DNQ						Wth															
97	Bryan Reffner																							DNQ												DNQ		
98	Ryan McGlynn																												DNQ									
99	Jason Jarrett					Wth																																
100	Dan Pardus																	Wth																				
101	Shane Hall																																	Wth				
102	Bobby Gerhart																				QL^{∞}																	
103	Jon Wood																									QL^{‹›}												
104	Mark Green																											QL^{#}										
Pos.	Driver	DAY	CAL	LVS	ATL	BRI	MAR	TEX	PHO	TAL	DAR	RCH	CLT	DOV	POC	MCH	SON	DAY	CHI	NHA	POC	IND	GLN	MCH	BRI	CAL	RCH	NHA	DOV	TAL	KAN	CLT	MAR	ATL	TEX	PHO	HOM	Pts.
^{†} – Kenny Wallace replaced Kurt Busch for the race after Busch was suspended by Roush Racing for the remainder of the season.^{‡} – Hermie Sadler originally qualified for the race but was replaced by Mike Skinner.^{₪} – Mike Wallace qualified for the race, but was replaced by P. J. Jones.^{¿} – J. J. Yeley qualified for Tony Stewart.^{¶} – David Stremme originally replaced Sterling Marlin, who had left the track to mourn the death of his father Coo Coo Marlin, but was replaced by Scott Pruett for the race after Pruett originally failed to qualify in another Chip Ganassi Racing entry.^{¡} – Paul Menard qualified for Robby Gordon.^{¥} – Chad Chaffin qualified for the race, but was replaced by Bobby Hamilton Jr.^{∞} – Bobby Gerhart qualified for Carl Edwards, who was running the Busch Series race at Pikes Peak International Raceway.^{‹›} – Jon Wood qualified for Ricky Rudd.^{†} – Mark Green qualified for Kyle Petty.

== Rookie of the year ==
The 2005 Rookie of the Year battle in NEXTEL Cup was pretty much decided halfway into the season. Twenty-year-old Kyle Busch became a phenomenon by winning twice and breaking the record for the youngest driver to win at NASCAR's premier level. Runner-up Travis Kvapil had a modest season, qualifying for every race, but only finishing in the top-ten twice. After that, the field was quite slim, as only Mike Garvey and Stanton Barrett ran more than seven races during the year. The only other declaree, Eric McClure, had resigned from his No. 73 Raabe Racing Enterprises ride after the season's third race. And while he had run too many races in 2004 to declare for the ROTY award for 2005, Carl Edwards became the most popular first-year driver – winning four races.

== See also ==
- 2005 NASCAR Busch Series
- 2005 NASCAR Craftsman Truck Series
- 2005 ARCA Re/Max Series
- 2005 NASCAR Whelen Modified Tour
- 2005 NASCAR Whelen Southern Modified Tour
- 2005 Chase for the Nextel Cup
