= 2005 Samsung/Radio Shack 500 =

Race details
- Race 7 of 36 in the 2005 NASCAR Nextel Cup Series
- 2005 Samsung/Radio Shack 500 program cover
- Date: April 17, 2005
- Location: Texas Motor Speedway
- Course length: 1.5 miles (2.414 km)
- Distance: 334 laps, 501 mi (806.281 km)
- Average speed: 130.055 mph (209.303 km/h)
- Attendance: 211,000

Pole position
Driver	Ryan Newman	Penske Racing
- Time: 28.040

Most laps led
Driver	Greg Biffle	Roush Fenway Racing
- Laps: 219

Winner
No. 16	Greg Biffle	Roush Fenway Racing

Television in the United States
- Network: FOX
- Announcers: Mike Joy, Larry McReynolds, Darrell Waltrip

Radio in the United States
- Radio: Performance Racing Network

The 2005 Samsung/Radio Shack 500 was the 7th race of the 2005 NASCAR Nextel Cup Series season, ran on April 17, 2005, at Texas Motor Speedway. The race was won by Greg Biffle, who went on to lead 216 laps of the 334 lap event.

== Qualifying ==
Pos	No.	Driver	Make	Speed	Time	Behind
1	12	Ryan Newman	Dodge	192.582	28.040	0.000
2	19	Jeremy Mayfield	Dodge	192.431	28.062	-0.022
3	9	Kasey Kahne	Dodge	191.734	28.164	-0.124
4	21	Ricky Rudd	Ford	191.557	28.190	-0.150
5	16	Greg Biffle	Ford	191.435	28.208	-0.168
6	2	Rusty Wallace	Dodge	191.286	28.230	-0.190
7	24	Jeff Gordon	Chevrolet	191.042	28.266	-0.226
8	38	Elliott Sadler	Ford	190.631	28.327	-0.287
9	1	Joe Nemechek	Chevrolet	190.611	28.330	-0.290
10	20	Tony Stewart	Chevrolet	190.590	28.333	-0.293
11	8	Dale Earnhardt Jr	Chevrolet	190.570	28.336	-0.296
12	7	Dave Blaney	Chevrolet	190.550	28.339	-0.299
13	40	Sterling Marlin	Dodge	190.510	28.345	-0.305
14	10	Scott Riggs	Chevrolet	190.342	28.370	-0.330
15	91	Bill Elliott	Dodge	190.248	28.384	-0.344
16	6	Mark Martin	Ford	190.174	28.395	-0.355
17	29	Kevin Harvick	Chevrolet	190.154	28.398	-0.358
18	48	Jimmie Johnson	Chevrolet	190.047	28.414	-0.374
19	97	Kurt Busch	Ford	189.860	28.442	-0.402
20	99	Carl Edwards	Ford	189.833	28.446	-0.406
21	15	Michael Waltrip	Chevrolet	189.687	28.468	-0.428
22	18	Bobby Labonte	Chevrolet	189.627	28.477	-0.437
23	43	Jeff Green	Dodge	189.580	28.484	-0.444
24	25	Brian Vickers	Chevrolet	189.281	28.529	-0.489
25	77	Travis Kvapil	Dodge	189.248	28.534	-0.494
26	4	Mike Wallace	Chevrolet	188.976	28.575	-0.535
27	88	Dale Jarrett	Ford	188.772	28.606	-0.566
28	45	Kyle Petty	Dodge	188.765	28.607	-0.567
29	11	Jason Leffler	Chevrolet	188.488	28.649	-0.609
30	49	Ken Schrader	Dodge	188.147	28.701	-0.661
31	42	Jamie McMurray	Dodge	188.048	28.716	-0.676
32	41	Casey Mears	Dodge	187.983	28.726	-0.686
33	7	Robby Gordon	Chevrolet	187.950	28.731	-0.691
34	9	Johnny Sauter	Dodge	187.735	28.764	-0.724
35	5	Kyle Busch	Chevrolet	187.709	28.768	-0.728
36	22	Scott Wimmer	Dodge	187.617	28.782	-0.742
37	66	Hermie Sadler	Ford	187.227	28.842	-0.802
38	32	Bobby Hamilton Jr	Chevrolet	187.221	28.843	-0.803
39	17	Matt Kenseth	Ford	187.149	28.854	-0.814
40	36	Boris Said	Chevrolet	187.058	28.868	-0.828
41	31	Jeff Burton	Chevrolet	185.899	29.048	-1.008
42	00	Mike Bliss	Chevrolet	0.000	0.000	0.000
43	44	Terry Labonte	Chevrolet	186.838	28.902	-0.862
Failed to qualify
44	37	Kevin Lepage	Dodge			
45	92	Stanton Barrett	Chevrolet			
46	34	Randy LaJoie	Chevrolet			

== Results ==
Pos	St	No.	Driver	Car	Laps	Money	Status	Led	Points
1	5	16	Greg Biffle	Ford	334	522250	running	219	190
2	31	42	Jamie McMurray	Dodge	334	308350	running	0	170
3	18	48	Jimmie Johnson	Chevrolet	334	216400	running	0	165
4	32	41	Casey Mears	Dodge	334	207908	running	15	165
5	13	40	Sterling Marlin	Dodge	334	158700	running	3	160
6	21	15	Michael Waltrip	Chevrolet	334	146050	running	7	155
7	19	97	Kurt Busch	Ford	334	134975	running	2	151
8	4	21	Ricky Rudd	Ford	334	124675	running	0	142
9	11	8	Dale Earnhardt Jr.	Chevrolet	334	117375	running	0	138
10	6	2	Rusty Wallace	Dodge	334	119200	running	0	134
11	2	19	Jeremy Mayfield	Dodge	334	123850	running	34	135
12	41	31	Jeff Burton	Chevrolet	334	115850	running	0	127
13	17	29	Kevin Harvick	Chevrolet	334	110100	running	0	124
14	27	88	Dale Jarrett	Ford	334	111425	running	0	121
15	7	24	Jeff Gordon	Chevrolet	334	107625	running	1	123
16	1	12	Ryan Newman	Dodge	334	118725	running	1	120
17	9	01	Joe Nemechek	Chevrolet	334	122983	running	0	112
18	39	17	Matt Kenseth	Ford	334	101625	running	1	114
19	20	99	Carl Edwards	Ford	334	100125	running	0	106
20	16	6	Mark Martin	Ford	334	100675	running	0	103
21	35	5	Kyle Busch	Chevrolet	334	102225	running	0	100
22	42	0	Mike Bliss	Chevrolet	333	99125	running	0	97
23	30	49	Ken Schrader	Dodge	333	97525	running	3	99
24	28	45	Kyle Petty	Dodge	333	110083	running	1	96
25	26	4	Mike Wallace	Chevrolet	333	95675	running	1	93
26	12	07	Dave Blaney	Chevrolet	332	92725	running	0	85
27	40	36	Boris Said	Chevrolet	327	88125	running	0	82
28	8	38	Elliott Sadler	Ford	324	86625	engine	1	84
29	37	66	Hermie Sadler	Ford	319	88525	running	0	76
30	25	77	Travis Kvapil	Dodge	297	87375	running	0	73
31	10	20	Tony Stewart	Chevrolet	296	82975	engine	45	75
32	14	10	Scott Riggs	Chevrolet	288	95533	running	0	67
33	15	91	Bill Elliott	Dodge	286	81225	engine	0	64
34	24	25	Brian Vickers	Chevrolet	278	79175	running	0	61
35	3	9	Kasey Kahne	Dodge	269	78075	engine	0	58
36	29	11	Jason Leffler	Chevrolet	250	76950	running	0	55
37	33	7	Robby Gordon	Chevrolet	238	75825	crash	0	52
38	22	18	Bobby Labonte	Chevrolet	232	74700	running	0	49
39	38	32	Bobby Hamilton Jr.	Chevrolet	219	84122	running	0	46
40	43	44	Terry Labonte	Chevrolet	202	74450	engine	0	43
41	34	09	Johnny Sauter	Dodge	98	74335	handling	0	40
42	36	22	Scott Wimmer	Dodge	39	74225	crash	0	37
43	23	43	Jeff Green	Dodge	31	74439	crash	0	34
