= 2005 Nextel All-Star Challenge =

21st iteration of NASCAR All-Star Race

Race details
- Date: May 21, 2005
- Location: Concord, North Carolina, Lowe's Motor Speedway
- Course: Permanent racing facility 1.5 mi (2.4 km)
- Distance: Open: 30 laps, 45 mi (72 km); All-Star Challenge: 90 Laps, 135 mi (217 km); Segment 1: 40 laps Segment 2: 30 laps Segment 3: 20 laps
- Avg Speed: Open: 95.688 mph (153.995 km/h); All-Star Challenge: 113.951 mph (183.386 km/h)

Nextel Open
- Pole: Mike Bliss (Haas CNC Racing)
- Time: 28.540
- Winner: Brian Vickers (Hendrick Motorsports)
- Fan Vote winner: Martin Truex Jr. (Dale Earnhardt Inc.)

Nextel All-Star Challenge
- Pole: Ryan Newman (Penske Racing)
- Pole: 2:02.443
- Most laps led: Ryan Newman (Penske Racing)
- Laps led: 45
- Winner: Mark Martin (Roush Racing)

Television
- Network: FX
- Announcers: Mike Joy, Larry McReynolds, Darrell Waltrip
- Network: Motor Racing Network

The 2005 Nextel All-Star Challenge was the second exhibition stock car race of the 2005 NASCAR Nextel Cup Series season and the 21st iteration of the event. The race was held on Saturday, May 21, 2005, in Concord, North Carolina at Lowe's Motor Speedway, a 1.5 miles (2.4 km) permanent quad-oval. The race took the scheduled 90 laps to complete. At race's end, Mark Martin of Roush Racing would hold off the field in the final segment to win the million dollar prize and his second Nextel All-Star Challenge win.

== Background ==
The layout of Lowe's Motor Speedway, the venue where the race was held.

Lowe's Motor Speedway is a motorsports complex located in Concord, North Carolina, United States 13 miles from Charlotte, North Carolina. The complex features a 1.5 miles (2.4 km) quad oval track that hosts NASCAR racing including the prestigious Coca-Cola 600 on Memorial Day weekend and the NEXTEL All-Star Challenge, as well as the UAW-GM Quality 500. The speedway was built in 1959 by Bruton Smith and is considered the home track for NASCAR with many race teams located in the Charlotte area. The track is owned and operated by Speedway Motorsports Inc. (SMI) with Marcus G. Smith (son of Bruton Smith) as track president.

=== Format and eligibility ===
The 90 laps of the Nextel All-Star Challenge was divided into three segments. Caution laps between segment breaks were not counted. The first segment was 40 laps long. Mandatory 10-minute pit stops/breaks were implemented in between both segment breaks. During the first 10-minute break, a random ping pong ball (each ball would have one NASCAR on Fox announcer or pit reporter on it) picked by Chris Myers would lead Myers to open a giant, promotional Nextel flip phone of the corresponding announcer. Each phone had a number that would decide how many cars would be inverted to start Segment 2, a 30-lap segment. After the second 10-minute break, drivers would race in a 20-lap shootout to decide the winner of the Nextel All-Star Challenge.

Drivers who had won in the previous season and the first 11 eleven races of the current season were automatically eligible to qualify for the Nextel All-Star Challenge. In addition, previous champions and former Nextel All-Star Challenge winners within the last 10 years (1995-2004) were also automatically eligible.

Teams who were not automatically eligible to qualify, but still wanted to have a chance at entering the Nextel All-Star Challenge were made to race in a qualifying race called the Nextel Open, a 30-lap shootout event where the winner of the event would qualify to race in the Nextel All-Star Challenge. Teams who were in the Top 50 in the 2004 NASCAR Nextel Cup Series owner's points standings were allowed to race in the Nextel Open. In addition, a televote was made open to the public where the driver who got the most votes from the public would also qualify to move on to the Nextel All-Star Challenge.

=== Entry list ===
==== Nextel Open ====
#	Driver	Team	Make
0	Mike Bliss	Haas CNC Racing	Chevrolet
1	Martin Truex Jr.	Dale Earnhardt, Inc.	Chevrolet
4	Mike Wallace	Morgan–McClure Motorsports	Chevrolet
5	Kyle Busch	Hendrick Motorsports	Chevrolet
7	Robby Gordon	Robby Gordon Motorsports	Chevrolet
07	Dave Blaney	Richard Childress Racing	Chevrolet
10	Scott Riggs	MBV Motorsports	Chevrolet
11	Jason Leffler	Joe Gibbs Racing	Chevrolet
21	Ricky Rudd	Wood Brothers Racing	Ford
22	Scott Wimmer	Bill Davis Racing	Dodge
25	Brian Vickers	Hendrick Motorsports	Chevrolet
27	Kirk Shelmerdine	Kirk Shelmerdine Racing	Ford
31	Jeff Burton	Richard Childress Racing	Chevrolet
32	Bobby Hamilton Jr.	PPI Motorsports	Chevrolet
36	Boris Said	MB Sutton Motorsports	Chevrolet
37	Kevin Lepage	R&J Racing	Dodge
40	Sterling Marlin	Chip Ganassi Racing with Felix Sabates	Dodge
41	Casey Mears	Chip Ganassi Racing with Felix Sabates	Dodge
42	Jamie McMurray	Chip Ganassi Racing with Felix Sabates	Dodge
43	Jeff Green	Petty Enterprises	Dodge
45	Kyle Petty	Petty Enterprises	Dodge
49	Ken Schrader	BAM Racing	Dodge
50	Jimmy Spencer	Arnold Motorsports	Dodge
60	Derrike Cope	S. W. A. T. Racing	Chevrolet
66	Hermie Sadler	Peak Fitness Racing	Ford
77	Travis Kvapil	Penske Racing	Dodge
89	Morgan Shepherd	Shepherd Racing Ventures	Dodge
92	Eric McClure	Front Row Motorsports	Chevrolet

==== Nextel All-Star Challenge ====
#	Driver	Team	Make
01	Joe Nemechek	MB2 Motorsports	Chevrolet
2	Rusty Wallace	Penske Racing	Dodge
6	Mark Martin	Roush Racing	Ford
8	Dale Earnhardt Jr.	Dale Earnhardt, Inc.	Chevrolet
9	Kasey Kahne	Evernham Motorsports	Dodge
12	Ryan Newman	Penske Racing	Dodge
15	Michael Waltrip	Dale Earnhardt, Inc.	Chevrolet
16	Greg Biffle	Roush Racing	Ford
17	Matt Kenseth	Roush Racing	Ford
18	Bobby Labonte	Joe Gibbs Racing	Chevrolet
19	Jeremy Mayfield	Evernham Motorsports	Dodge
20	Tony Stewart	Joe Gibbs Racing	Chevrolet
24	Jeff Gordon	Hendrick Motorsports	Chevrolet
29	Kevin Harvick	Richard Childress Racing	Chevrolet
38	Elliott Sadler	Robert Yates Racing	Ford
44	Terry Labonte	Hendrick Motorsports	Chevrolet
48	Jimmie Johnson	Hendrick Motorsports	Chevrolet
88	Dale Jarrett	Robert Yates Racing	Ford
97	Kurt Busch	Roush Racing	Ford
99	Carl Edwards	Roush Racing	Ford

== Practice ==
=== Nextel Open practice ===
While there were two scheduled Nextel Open practices, the first practice was delayed by rain, leading to the cancellation of the second session.

The only 45-minute practice session was held on Friday, May 20 at 1:15 PM EST. Kyle Busch of Hendrick Motorsports would set the fastest time in the session, with a lap of 28.637 and an average speed of 188.567 miles per hour (303.469 km/h).

Pos.	#	Driver	Team	Make	Time	Speed
1	5	Kyle Busch	Hendrick Motorsports	Chevrolet	28.637	188.567
2	25	Brian Vickers	Hendrick Motorsports	Chevrolet	28.783	187.611
3	1	Martin Truex Jr.	Dale Earnhardt, Inc.	Chevrolet	28.920	186.722
Full Nextel Open practice results

=== Nextel All-Star Challenge practice ===
The only 45-minute practice session was held on Friday, May 20 at 2:15 PM EST. Ryan Newman of Penske Racing would set the fastest time in the session, with a lap of 28.863 and an average speed of 187.091 miles per hour (301.094 km/h).

Pos.	#	Driver	Team	Make	Time	Speed
1	12	Ryan Newman	Penske Racing	Dodge	28.863	187.091
2	19	Jeremy Mayfield	Evernham Motorsports	Dodge	28.890	186.916
3	2	Rusty Wallace	Penske Racing	Dodge	28.911	186.780
Full Nextel All-Star practice results

== Qualifying ==
=== Nextel Open ===
Qualifying for the Nextel Open was held on Friday, May 20, at 6:05 PM EST. Each driver would have two laps to set a fastest time; the fastest of the two would count as their official qualifying lap.

Mike Bliss of Haas CNC Racing would win the pole, setting a time of 28.540 and an average speed of 189.208 miles per hour (304.501 km/h).

In qualifying, two drivers would fail to make a lap due to a crash: Scott Riggs would spin on the backstretch and hit the wall, and Jason Leffler would slam the Turn 3 wall after getting loose entering the corner.

Pos.	#	Driver	Team	Make	Time	Speed
1	0	Mike Bliss	Haas CNC Racing	Chevrolet	28.540	189.208
2	5	Kyle Busch	Hendrick Motorsports	Chevrolet	28.617	188.699
3	41	Casey Mears	Chip Ganassi Racing with Felix Sabates	Dodge	28.639	188.554
4	77	Travis Kvapil	Penske Racing	Dodge	28.663	188.396
5	25	Brian Vickers	Hendrick Motorsports	Chevrolet	28.797	187.520
6	49	Ken Schrader	BAM Racing	Dodge	28.833	187.285
7	37	Kevin Lepage	R&J Racing	Dodge	28.856	187.136
8	1	Martin Truex Jr.	Dale Earnhardt, Inc.	Chevrolet	28.870	187.045
9	21	Ricky Rudd	Wood Brothers Racing	Ford	28.882	186.968
10	50	Jimmy Spencer	Arnold Motorsports	Dodge	28.882	186.968
11	32	Bobby Hamilton Jr.	PPI Motorsports	Chevrolet	28.891	186.909
12	7	Robby Gordon	Robby Gordon Motorsports	Chevrolet	28.932	186.645
13	40	Sterling Marlin	Chip Ganassi Racing with Felix Sabates	Dodge	28.942	186.580
14	43	Jeff Green	Petty Enterprises	Dodge	29.018	186.091
15	22	Scott Wimmer	Bill Davis Racing	Dodge	29.109	185.510
16	31	Jeff Burton	Richard Childress Racing	Chevrolet	29.208	184.881
17	42	Jamie McMurray	Chip Ganassi Racing with Felix Sabates	Dodge	29.218	184.818
18	45	Kyle Petty	Petty Enterprises	Dodge	29.247	184.634
19	07	Dave Blaney	Richard Childress Racing	Chevrolet	29.405	183.642
20	66	Hermie Sadler	Peak Fitness Racing	Ford	29.429	183.492
21	60	Derrike Cope	S. W. A. T. Racing	Chevrolet	29.545	182.772
22	36	Boris Said	MB Sutton Motorsports	Chevrolet	29.556	182.704
23	92	Eric McClure	Front Row Motorsports	Chevrolet	29.645	182.156
24	4	Mike Wallace	Morgan–McClure Motorsports	Chevrolet	29.759	181.458
25	27	Kirk Shelmerdine	Kirk Shelmerdine Racing	Ford	30.080	179.521
26	89	Morgan Shepherd	Shepherd Racing Ventures	Dodge	30.239	178.577
27	10	Scott Riggs	MBV Motorsports	Chevrolet	—	—
28	11	Jason Leffler	Joe Gibbs Racing	Chevrolet	—	—
Official starting lineup

=== Nextel All-Star Challenge ===
Qualifying for the Nextel All-Star Challenge was held on Friday, May 20, at 7:10 PM EST. Each driver would run 3 laps each, with each driver having to do a mandatory pit stop within those three laps.

Ryan Newman of Penske Racing would win the pole with a time of 2:02.443 and an average speed of 44.102 miles per hour (70.975 km/h).

Pos.	#	Driver	Team	Make	Time	Speed
1	12	Ryan Newman	Penske Racing	Dodge	2:02.443	44.102
2	6	Mark Martin	Roush Racing	Ford	2:03.192	43.834
3	2	Rusty Wallace	Penske Racing	Dodge	2:03.227	43.822
4	38	Elliott Sadler	Robert Yates Racing	Ford	2:03.414	43.755
5	9	Kasey Kahne	Evernham Motorsports	Dodge	2:04.197	43.479
6	48	Jimmie Johnson	Hendrick Motorsports	Chevrolet	2:04.625	43.330
7	99	Carl Edwards	Roush Racing	Ford	2:04.887	43.239
8	97	Kurt Busch	Roush Racing	Ford	2:05.171	43.141
9	01	Joe Nemechek	MB2 Motorsports	Chevrolet	2:05.271	43.106
10	17	Matt Kenseth	Roush Racing	Ford	2:05.896	42.893
11	16	Greg Biffle	Roush Racing	Ford	2:06.725	42.612
12	18	Bobby Labonte	Joe Gibbs Racing	Chevrolet	2:07.116	42.481
13	44	Terry Labonte	Hendrick Motorsports	Chevrolet	2:08.399	42.056
14	24	Jeff Gordon	Hendrick Motorsports	Chevrolet	2:08.673	41.967
15	19	Jeremy Mayfield	Evernham Motorsports	Dodge	2:09.691	41.637
16	15	Michael Waltrip	Dale Earnhardt, Inc.	Chevrolet	2:14.626	40.111
17	20	Tony Stewart	Joe Gibbs Racing	Chevrolet	2:17.819	39.182
18	29	Kevin Harvick	Richard Childress Racing	Chevrolet	2:24.221	37.443
19	88	Dale Jarrett	Robert Yates Racing	Ford	2:25.571	37.095
20	8	Dale Earnhardt Jr.	Dale Earnhardt, Inc.	Chevrolet	2:26.022	36.981
21	25	Brian Vickers*	Hendrick Motorsports	Chevrolet	—	—
22	1	Martin Truex Jr.**	Dale Earnhardt, Inc.	Chevrolet	—	—
Official starting lineup

*Won the Nextel Open to qualify.

**Won the fan vote to qualify.

== NASCAR Pit Crew Challenge ==
The inaugural NASCAR Pit Crew Challenge was announced during the week of the race. Kasey Kahne's team, owned by Evernham Motorsports would win the challenge.

=== Format and eligibility ===
To be eligible to compete, a team either had to win a race in 2004 or 2005, win a previous Nextel All-Star Challenge race, or have won the championship within the last 10 years. The Nextel Open and Fan Vote winners from the 2004 Nextel All-Star Challenge were automatically eligible to enter. While 20 teams were scheduled to compete, Terry Labonte would withdraw, leaving three spots to be allocated by owner's points.

24 teams would compete in a tournament-style bracket with four rounds.

==== Round 1 ====
Round 1 would consist of the 24 teams racing against the clock, two teams at a time, in an individual skills/team competition. The teams with the fastest eight overall team times would move on to Round 2.

There were 4 skills that each team had to individually accomplish with their respective members, along with one team exercise at the end:

Front Tire Changer and Front Tire Carrier: The front tire changer and carriers will start from outside the pit box, attacking the right side of the car first, then moving onto the left. The second tire will be pre-positioned by the carrier at the pit wall. Competitors will use their own air guns, and a five second time penalty will be administered for any lugs not properly installed. Tire changer must hit split timer button on exit of pit box.

Rear Tire Changer and Rear Tire Carrier: The rear tire changer and carriers will start from outside the pit box, attacking the right side of the car first, then moving onto the left. The second tire will be pre-positioned by the carrier at the pit wall. Competitors will use their own air guns, and a five second time penalty will be administered for any lugs not properly installed. Tire changer must hit split timer button on exit of pit box.

Gas Man: The gas man and catch can man will be responsible for filling a car with 18 gallons of non-flammable liquid, using two pre-loaded nine gallon cans. Gas men will start with one fuel can in hand from just over the wall near the left rear of the car, and will be timed through setting the second can down. If the fuel cans are not empty, the competitor will receive a time penalty. The gas man must hit the split timer on exit of pit box.

Jack Man: The jack man, using his own jack, must jack each side of the car high enough to lift both tires off the ground. A NASCAR Nextel Cup Series official will signal when the tires on each side of the car are off the ground. The jack man must start from outside of the pit box with his hands off the jack and must set off each light before hitting the split timer button and leaving his pit box.

40 Yard Push: As soon as each team member finishes their respective station, they can go to the center of the Charlotte Coliseum, where a special 40-yard lane is created. Each team will get to push their own 3,200 pound (without driver) race car across the finish line. Timing will begin when the car starts to move, finishing when the nose of the racing machine crosses the electronic finish line.

==== Round 2 ====
The eight teams that moved on from Round 1 would go against each other, with seeds being based on overall team time. Round 2 would have each team doing the same challenge as Round 1. The team who won against the other would move on to Round 3.

==== Round 3 ====
The four teams that moved on from Round 2 would face off in the semifinals. In this round, the teams would perform a regular four-tire pit stop- whoever won their respective battle would move on to the final.

==== Round 4 ====
The two teams that moved on from Round 3 would face off in the final. Similar to Round 3, the teams would perform a regular four-tire pit stop- whoever won the final won the challenge.

=== Bracket ===
Quarterfinals
1	No. 17 of Roush Racing	Lost
8	No. 12 of Penske Racing	Won
4	No. 9 of Evernham Motorsports	Won
5	No. 40 of Chip Ganassi Racing with Felix Sabates	Lost
2	No. 6 of Roush Racing	Lost
7	No. 42 of Chip Ganassi Racing with Felix Sabates	Won
3	No. 01 of MB2 Motorsports	Won
6	No. 49 of BAM Racing	Lost

Semifinals
No. 12 of Penske Racing	Lost
No. 9 of Evernham Motorsports	Won
No. 42 of Chip Ganassi Racing with Felix Sabates	Won
No. 01 of MB2 Motorsports	Lost

Finals
No. 9 of Evernham Motorsports	Won
No. 42 of Chip Ganassi Racing with Felix Sabates	Lost

== Race recap ==
=== Nextel Open ===
Mike Bliss would take the lead on the start, but the racing would be short lived as Scott Riggs got loose and slammed the wall in the middle of Turns 3-4, ending his day.

The race would restart on Lap 5, with Travis Kvapil stealing the lead on the outside from Bliss on the restart. However, just three laps later, Morgan Shepherd would blow a tire and destroy the right side of his car, ending his day and dealing a major financial blow to Shepherd's team, Shepherd Racing Ventures. During the break, some teams would decide to take four tires, including Kyle Busch.

The race would restart on Lap 12, with Kvapil and Bliss in a fierce battle for the lead, with Bliss eventually besting Kvapil on the restart. However, Kvapil would stay within reach of Bliss and retake the lead on Lap 14. Kvapil would be able to hang on to the lead until Lap 20, when the first segment ended.

During the caution, everyone but the Top 4 and Kyle Busch would make pit stops. Bobby Hamilton Jr. would lead the cycle.

Bliss would once again lead the field, taking the lead from Kvapil on the high side. Three cars, Bliss, Kvapil, and Brian Vickers, relatively untalked about all day, would pull away from the rest of the field. The three coming to six to go would all be very close to each other, with each on their bumper. Kvapil would try and make a move coming to 5 to go, but would fail. Vickers would manage to pass Kvapil coming to four to go. Vickers and Bliss would pull away from Kvapil, and battle to the end to enter the Nextel All-Star Challenge. Vickers would slowly manage to pull in Bliss, with Vickers running a lower line than Bliss. Coming to the white flag, Bliss would get a run. However, coming into turn one, Bliss would run a lower side than Vickers, making Vickers have a run on Bliss. Bliss would throw a block coming into Turn 3, killing Vickers' momentum. Vickers would once again run a lower line than Bliss, but couldn't get to Bliss' door. Coming out of the turn, Vickers was on his bumper, but wasn't on his door, seeming like Bliss would take the win. However, at the last second, Bliss would throw a late block on Vickers, hitting Vickers' bumper and causing Bliss to spin, causing Bliss to finish by sliding through the grass. In the short distance to the finish, Vickers would pass the spinning Bliss and win the Nextel Open, guaranteeing Vickers a spot in the Nextel All-Star Challenge.

== Nextel Open results ==
Fin	St	#	Driver	Team	Make	Laps	Led	Status	Winnings
1	5	25	Brian Vickers	Hendrick Motorsports	Chevrolet	30	1	running	$53,325
2	1	0	Mike Bliss	Haas CNC Racing	Chevrolet	30	16	running	$43,325
3	4	77	Travis Kvapil	Penske Racing	Dodge	30	13	running	$39,325
4	2	5	Kyle Busch	Hendrick Motorsports	Chevrolet	30	0	running	$37,225
5	11	32	Bobby Hamilton Jr.	PPI Motorsports	Chevrolet	30	0	running	$36,225
6	3	41	Casey Mears	Chip Ganassi Racing with Felix Sabates	Dodge	30	0	running	$34,225
7	12	7	Robby Gordon	Robby Gordon Motorsports	Chevrolet	30	0	running	$33,225
8	9	21	Ricky Rudd	Wood Brothers Racing	Ford	30	0	running	$32,625
9	6	49	Ken Schrader	BAM Racing	Dodge	30	0	running	$32,125
10	8	1	Martin Truex Jr.	Dale Earnhardt, Inc.	Chevrolet	30	0	running	$31,875
11	16	31	Jeff Burton	Richard Childress Racing	Chevrolet	30	0	running	$31,600
12	14	43	Jeff Green	Petty Enterprises	Dodge	30	0	running	$31,350
13	13	40	Sterling Marlin	Chip Ganassi Racing with Felix Sabates	Dodge	30	0	running	$31,100
14	17	42	Jamie McMurray	Chip Ganassi Racing with Felix Sabates	Dodge	30	0	running	$31,000
15	15	22	Scott Wimmer	Bill Davis Racing	Dodge	30	0	running	$30,875
16	10	50	Jimmy Spencer	Arnold Motorsports	Dodge	30	0	running	$30,775
17	19	07	Dave Blaney	Richard Childress Racing	Chevrolet	30	0	running	$30,675
18	24	4	Mike Wallace	Morgan–McClure Motorsports	Chevrolet	30	0	running	$30,575
19	7	37	Kevin Lepage	R&J Racing	Dodge	30	0	running	$30,475
20	20	66	Hermie Sadler	Peak Fitness Racing	Ford	30	0	running	$30,375
21	21	60	Derrike Cope	S. W. A. T. Racing	Chevrolet	30	0	running	$30,275
22	18	45	Kyle Petty	Petty Enterprises	Dodge	30	0	running	$30,175
23	22	36	Boris Said	MB Sutton Motorsports	Chevrolet	30	0	running	$30,075
24	28	11	Jason Leffler	Joe Gibbs Racing	Chevrolet	30	0	running	$29,975
25	25	27	Kirk Shelmerdine	Kirk Shelmerdine Racing	Ford	30	0	running	$29,875
26	23	92	Eric McClure	Front Row Motorsports	Chevrolet	20	0	overheating	$29,775
27	26	89	Morgan Shepherd	Shepherd Racing Ventures	Dodge	6	0	accident	$29,675
28	27	10	Scott Riggs	MBV Motorsports	Chevrolet	2	0	accident	$29,575
Official race results

== Nextel All-Star Challenge results ==
Fin	St	#	Driver	Team	Make	Laps	Led	Status	Winnings
1	2	6	Mark Martin	Roush Racing	Ford	90	24	running	$1,101,325
2	4	38	Elliott Sadler	Robert Yates Racing	Ford	90	21	running	$268,825
3	21	25	Brian Vickers	Hendrick Motorsports	Chevrolet	90	0	running	$191,950
4	14	24	Jeff Gordon	Hendrick Motorsports	Chevrolet	90	0	running	$97,825
5	6	48	Jimmie Johnson	Hendrick Motorsports	Chevrolet	90	0	running	$93,825
6	19	88	Dale Jarrett	Robert Yates Racing	Ford	90	0	running	$89,825
7	8	97	Kurt Busch	Roush Racing	Ford	90	0	running	$85,825
8	15	19	Jeremy Mayfield	Evernham Motorsports	Dodge	90	0	running	$84,825
9	12	18	Bobby Labonte	Joe Gibbs Racing	Chevrolet	90	0	running	$83,825
10	20	8	Dale Earnhardt Jr.	Dale Earnhardt, Inc.	Chevrolet	90	0	running	$82,825
11	10	17	Matt Kenseth	Roush Racing	Ford	89	0	running	$81,800
12	1	12	Ryan Newman	Penske Racing	Dodge	71	45	accident	$205,800
13	3	2	Rusty Wallace	Penske Racing	Dodge	71	0	accident	$84,800
14	11	16	Greg Biffle	Roush Racing	Ford	69	0	suspension	$89,300
15	7	99	Carl Edwards	Roush Racing	Ford	57	0	accident	$78,800
16	5	9	Kasey Kahne	Evernham Motorsports	Dodge	35	0	accident	$78,700
17	17	20	Tony Stewart	Joe Gibbs Racing	Chevrolet	35	0	accident	$78,575
18	18	29	Kevin Harvick	Richard Childress Racing	Chevrolet	35	0	accident	$78,475
19	13	44	Terry Labonte	Hendrick Motorsports	Chevrolet	35	0	accident	$78,375
20	16	15	Michael Waltrip	Dale Earnhardt, Inc.	Chevrolet	35	0	accident	$78,275
21	9	01	Joe Nemechek	MB2 Motorsports	Chevrolet	35	0	accident	$78,175
22	22	1	Martin Truex Jr.	Dale Earnhardt, Inc.	Chevrolet	35	0	accident	$109,950
Official race results
