= 2005 Aaron's 499 =

Race details
- Race 9 of 36 in the 2005 NASCAR Nextel Cup Series
- 2005 Aaron's 499 program cover
- Date: May 1, 2005
- Location: Talladega Superspeedway, Lincoln, Alabama
- Course: Permanent racing facility
- Course length: 2.66 miles (4.281 km)
- Distance: 194 laps, 516.04 mi (830.486 km)
- Scheduled distance: 188 laps, 500.08 mi (804.801 km)
- Average speed: 146.904 mph (236.419 km/h)
- Attendance: 155,000

Pole position
Driver	Kevin Harvick	Richard Childress Racing
- Time: 50.452

Most laps led
Driver	Jeff Gordon	Hendrick Motorsports
- Laps: 139

Winner
No. 24	Jeff Gordon	Hendrick Motorsports

Television in the United States
- Network: FOX

Radio in the United States
- Radio: Motor Racing Network

The 2005 Aaron's 499 was the 9th race of the 2005 NASCAR Nextel Cup Series season, held on May 1, 2005, at Talladega Superspeedway in Lincoln, Alabama. The race was won by Jeff Gordon, who led 139 laps of the 194 lap race. The race was extended from the scheduled 188 laps due to a late race caution.

== Entry list ==
No.	Driver	Make	Team
00	Kenny Wallace	Chevrolet	Buffy Waltrip
0	Mike Bliss	Chevrolet	Gene Haas
01	Joe Nemechek	Chevrolet	Nelson Bowers
1	Martin Truex Jr	Chevrolet	Teresa Earnhardt
2	Rusty Wallace	Dodge	Roger Penske
4	Mike Wallace	Chevrolet	Larry McClure
5	Kyle Busch	Chevrolet	Rick Hendrick
6	Mark Martin	Ford	Jack Roush
07	Dave Blaney	Chevrolet	Richard Childress
7	Robby Gordon	Chevrolet	James Smith
8	Dale Earnhardt Jr.	Chevrolet	Teresa Earnhardt
09	Johnny Sauter	Dodge	James Finch
9	Kasey Kahne	Dodge	Ray Evernham
10	Scott Riggs	Chevrolet	James Rocco
11	Jason Leffler	Chevrolet	J D Gibbs
12	Ryan Newman	Dodge	Roger Penske
15	Michael Waltrip	Chevrolet	Teresa Earnhardt
16	Greg Biffle	Ford	Geoff Smith
17	Matt Kenseth	Ford	Mark Martin
18	Bobby Labonte	Chevrolet	Joe Gibbs
19	Jeremy Mayfield	Dodge	Ray Evernham
20	Tony Stewart	Chevrolet	Joe Gibbs
21	Ricky Rudd	Ford	Glen Wood
22	Scott Wimmer	Dodge	Bill Davis
23	Mike Skinner	Dodge	Gail Davis
24	Jeff Gordon	Chevrolet	Rick Hendrick
25	Brian Vickers	Chevrolet	Mary Hendrick
29	Kevin Harvick	Chevrolet	Richard Childress
31	Jeff Burton	Chevrolet	Richard Childress
32	Bobby Hamilton Jr	Chevrolet	Calvin Wells III
33	Kerry Earnhardt	Chevrolet	Richard Childress
36	Boris Said	Chevrolet	Bob Sutton
37	Kevin Lepage	Dodge	John Carter
38	Elliott Sadler	Ford	Robert Yates
40	Sterling Marlin	Dodge	Felix Sabates
41	Casey Mears	Dodge	Chip Ganassi
42	Jamie McMurray	Dodge	Floyd Ganassi
43	Jeff Green	Dodge	Richard L Petty
45	Kyle Petty	Dodge	Kyle Petty
48	Jimmie Johnson	Chevrolet	Jeff Gordon
49	Ken Schrader	Dodge	Elizabeth Morgenthau
66	Hermie Sadler	Ford	Jeff Stec
77	Travis Kvapil	Dodge	Douglas Bawel
88	Dale Jarrett	Ford	Robert Yates
92	Stanton Barrett	Chevrolet	Bob Jenkins
97	Kurt Busch	Ford	Georgetta Roush
99	Carl Edwards	Ford	Jack Roush

== Qualifying ==
Pos	No.	Driver	Make	Speed	Time	Behind
1	29	Kevin Harvick	Chevrolet	189.804	50.452	0.000
2	24	Jeff Gordon	Chevrolet	188.988	50.670	-0.218
3	38	Elliott Sadler	Ford	188.548	50.788	-0.336
4	10	Scott Riggs	Chevrolet	188.474	50.808	-0.356
5	12	Ryan Newman	Dodge	188.237	50.872	-0.420
6	48	Jimmie Johnson	Chevrolet	188.226	50.875	-0.423
7	21	Ricky Rudd	Ford	188.156	50.894	-0.442
8	07	Dave Blaney	Chevrolet	187.919	50.958	-0.506
9	77	Travis Kvapil	Dodge	187.857	50.975	-0.523
10	97	Kurt Busch	Ford	187.831	50.982	-0.530
11	20	Tony Stewart	Chevrolet	187.713	51.014	-0.562
12	36	Boris Said	Chevrolet	187.471	51.080	-0.628
13	42	Jamie McMurray	Dodge	187.427	51.092	-0.640
14	88	Dale Jarrett	Ford	187.350	51.113	-0.661
15	18	Bobby Labonte	Chevrolet	187.298	51.127	-0.675
16	6	Mark Martin	Ford	187.276	51.133	-0.681
17	22	Scott Wimmer	Dodge	187.276	51.133	-0.681
18	11	Jason Leffler	Chevrolet	187.265	51.136	-0.684
19	9	Kasey Kahne	Dodge	187.247	51.141	-0.689
20	2	Rusty Wallace	Dodge	187.232	51.145	-0.693
21	99	Carl Edwards	Ford	187.192	51.156	-0.704
22	19	Jeremy Mayfield	Dodge	187.192	51.156	-0.704
23	17	Matt Kenseth	Ford	187.071	51.189	-0.737
24	1	Joe Nemechek	Chevrolet	187.068	51.190	-0.738
25	40	Sterling Marlin	Dodge	186.955	51.221	-0.769
26	41	Casey Mears	Dodge	186.849	51.250	-0.798
27	31	Jeff Burton	Chevrolet	186.710	51.288	-0.836
28	0	Mike Bliss	Chevrolet	186.685	51.295	-0.843
29	16	Greg Biffle	Ford	186.536	51.336	-0.884
30	66	Hermie Sadler	Ford	186.529	51.338	-0.886
31	33	Kerry Earnhardt	Chevrolet	186.496	51.347	-0.895
32	1	Martin Truex Jr	Chevrolet	186.351	51.387	-0.935
33	4	Mike Wallace	Chevrolet	186.198	51.429	-0.977
34	23	Mike Skinner	Dodge	186.148	51.443	-0.991
35	5	Kyle Busch	Chevrolet	186.108	51.454	-1.002
36	8	Dale Earnhardt Jr	Chevrolet	185.934	51.502	-1.050
37	25	Brian Vickers	Chevrolet	185.934	51.502	-1.050
38	15	Michael Waltrip	Chevrolet	185.877	51.518	-1.066
39	43	Jeff Green	Dodge	185.848	51.526	-1.074
40	32	Bobby Hamilton Jr	Chevrolet	185.729	51.559	-1.107
41	45	Kyle Petty	Dodge	185.348	51.665	-1.213
42	49	Ken Schrader	Dodge	183.988	52.047	-1.595
43	09	Johnny Sauter	Dodge	185.151	51.720	-1.268
Failed to qualify
44	7	Robby Gordon	Chevrolet	185.104	51.733	-1.281
45	37	Kevin Lepage	Dodge	184.623	51.868	-1.416
46	00	Kenny Wallace	Chevrolet	184.338	51.948	-1.496
47	92	Stanton Barrett	Chevrolet	184.038	52.032	-1.580

== Results ==
Fin	St	No.	Driver	Make	Laps	Led	Status	Pts
1	2	24	Jeff Gordon	Chevrolet	194	139	running	190
2	11	20	Tony Stewart	Chevrolet	194	2	running	175
3	38	15	Michael Waltrip	Chevrolet	194	2	running	170
4	22	19	Jeremy Mayfield	Dodge	194	0	running	160
5	13	42	Jamie McMurray	Dodge	194	0	running	155
6	3	38	Elliott Sadler	Ford	194	9	running	155
7	10	97	Kurt Busch	Ford	194	1	running	151
8	42	49	Ken Schrader	Dodge	194	1	running	147
9	14	88	Dale Jarrett	Ford	194	0	running	138
10	27	31	Jeff Burton	Chevrolet	194	0	running	134
11	23	17	Matt Kenseth	Ford	194	0	running	130
12	1	29	Kevin Harvick	Chevrolet	194	12	running	132
13	29	16	Greg Biffle	Ford	194	2	running	129
14	26	41	Casey Mears	Dodge	193	0	running	121
15	36	8	Dale Earnhardt, Jr.	Chevrolet	193	3	running	123
16	43	09	Johnny Sauter	Dodge	192	0	running	115
17	31	33	Kerry Earnhardt	Chevrolet	190	0	running	112
18	9	77	Travis Kvapil	Dodge	188	0	crash	109
19	8	07	Dave Blaney	Chevrolet	187	0	running	106
20	6	48	Jimmie Johnson	Chevrolet	186	8	crash	108
21	32	1	Martin Truex, Jr.	Chevrolet	186	0	crash	100
22	20	2	Rusty Wallace	Dodge	180	0	running	97
23	15	18	Bobby Labonte	Chevrolet	174	1	engine	99
24	19	9	Kasey Kahne	Dodge	172	0	running	91
25	39	43	Jeff Green	Dodge	172	0	running	88
26	18	11	Jason Leffler	Chevrolet	171	0	running	85
27	4	10	Scott Riggs	Chevrolet	171	4	running	87
28	33	4	Mike Wallace	Chevrolet	171	1	running	84
29	30	66	Hermie Sadler	Ford	170	0	rear end	76
30	7	21	Ricky Rudd	Ford	170	0	running	73
31	24	01	Joe Nemechek	Chevrolet	169	1	running	75
32	21	99	Carl Edwards	Ford	166	0	running	67
33	16	6	Mark Martin	Ford	166	3	running	69
34	25	40	Sterling Marlin	Dodge	162	0	running	61
35	12	36	Boris Said	Chevrolet	146	0	crash	58
36	28	0	Mike Bliss	Chevrolet	141	0	crash	55
37	37	25	Brian Vickers	Chevrolet	139	0	crash	52
38	17	22	Scott Wimmer	Dodge	139	0	crash	49
39	5	12	Ryan Newman	Dodge	135	5	crash	51
40	40	32	Bobby Hamilton, Jr.	Chevrolet	132	0	crash	43
41	35	5	Kyle Busch	Chevrolet	132	0	crash	40
42	34	23	Mike Skinner	Dodge	132	0	crash	37
43	41	45	Kyle Petty	Dodge	106	0	running	34

Preceded by 2005 Subway Fresh 500	NASCAR Nextel Cup Season; 2005	Succeeded by 2005 Dodge Charger 500
