= Clint Bowyer =

American racing driver (born 1979)

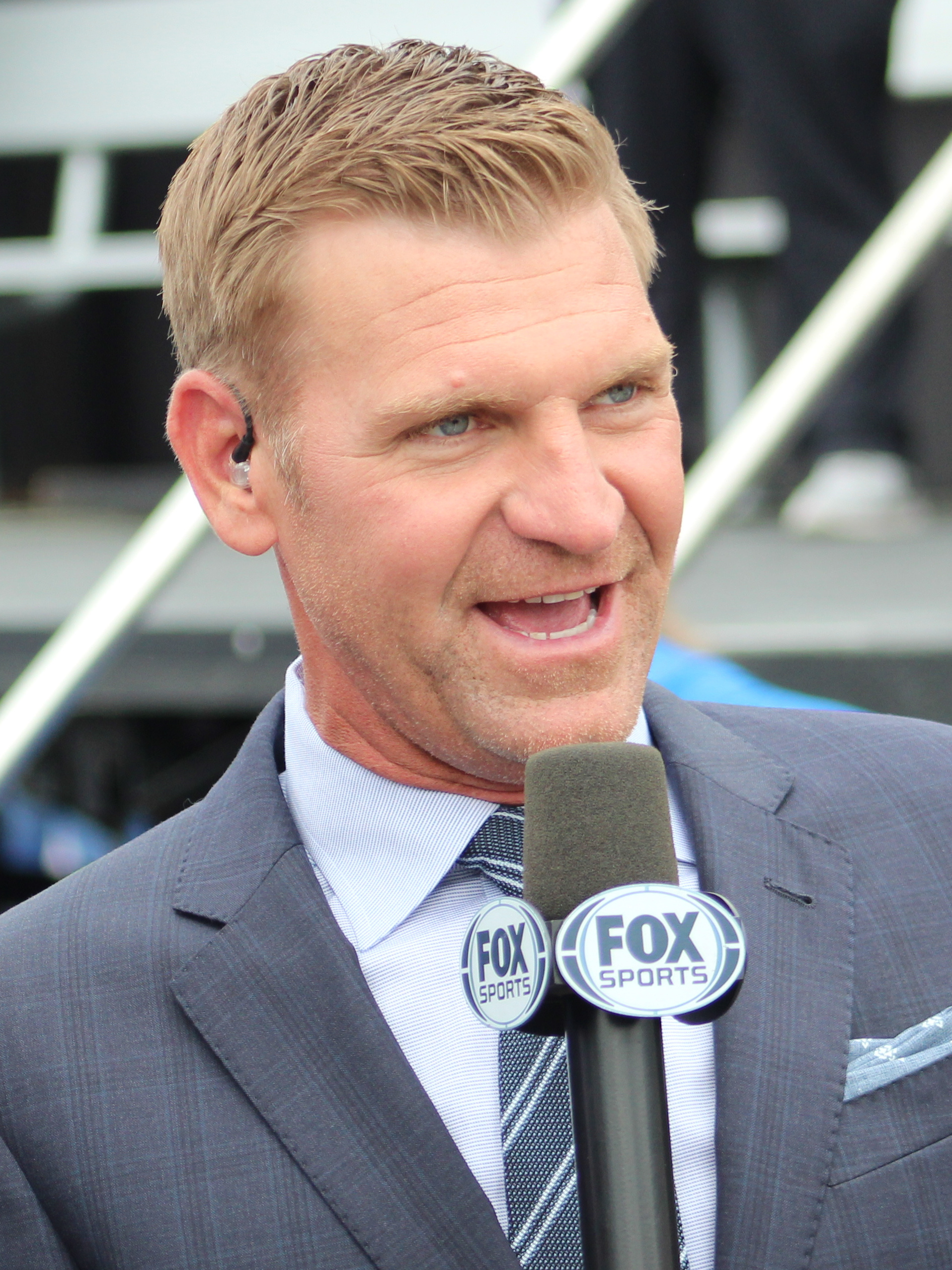
- Bowyer in 2022
- Born: Clinton Aaron Bowyer; May 30, 1979 (age 47); Emporia, Kansas, U.S.
- Height: 6 ft 0 in (1.83 m)
- Weight: 155 lb (70 kg)
- Achievements: 2008 NASCAR Nationwide Series Champion; 2002 NASCAR Weekly Racing Series Midwest Division Champion; 2011 UNOH DIRTcar Nationals Modified Overall Champion; 2011 Prelude to the Dream Winner; 2010, 2011 Alabama 500 Winner; 2014, 2015, 2017 NASCAR All-Star Race Open Winner; Has won with three separate engine manufacturers in NASCAR (Chevrolet, Toyota, Ford)

NASCAR Cup Series career
- 541 races run over 16 years
- 2020 position: 12th
- Best finish: 2nd (2012)
- First race: 2005 Subway Fresh 500 (Phoenix)
- Last race: 2020 Season Finale 500 (Phoenix)
- First win: 2007 Sylvania 300 (New Hampshire)
- Last win: 2018 FireKeepers Casino 400 (Michigan)
Wins	Top tens	Poles
10	226	4

NASCAR O'Reilly Auto Parts Series career
- 181 races run over 10 years
- 2016 position: 104th
- Best finish: 1st (2008)
- First race: 2004 O'Reilly 300 (Texas)
- Last race: 2016 Drive for Safety 300 (Chicagoland)
- First win: 2005 Federated Auto Parts 300 (Nashville)
- Last win: 2009 Dover 200 (Dover)
Wins	Top tens	Poles
8	116	9

NASCAR FedEx Freight Truck Series career
- 16 races run over 9 years
- 2026 position: 82nd
- Best finish: 42nd (2006)
- First race: 2006 Kroger 250 (Martinsville)
- Last race: 2026 Ecosave 200 (Dover)
- First win: 2006 Silverado 350K (Texas)
- Last win: 2011 O'Reilly Auto Parts 250 (Kansas)
Wins	Top tens	Poles
3	10	2

ARCA Menards Series career
- 3 races run over 2 years
- Best finish: 74th (2003)
- First race: 2003 Waste Management 200 (Nashville)
- Last race: 2004 Advance Discount Auto Parts 200 (Daytona)
Wins	Top tens	Poles
0	2	0

ARCA Menards Series West career
- 2 races run over 1 year
- Best finish: 32nd (2004)
- First race: 2004 United Rentals 150 (Phoenix)
- Last race: 2004 King Taco 200 (California)
Wins	Top tens	Poles
0	2	1
- Statistics up to date as of November 6, 2026.

Clinton Aaron Bowyer (born May 30, 1979) is an American semi-retired professional stock car racing driver and commentator for NASCAR on Fox.

He competed in the NASCAR Cup Series from 2005 to 2020, driving for Richard Childress Racing for eight years, Michael Waltrip Racing for four years, HScott Motorsports for one year, and Stewart–Haas Racing for four years. Bowyer won the 2008 Nationwide Series championship driving for RCR. Following the 2020 season, Bowyer retired from full-time racing and became an analyst for Fox Sports' NASCAR coverage.

== Early career ==
Bowyer began racing at the age of five in motocross. He went on to capture over two hundred wins and numerous championships over the next eight years. In 1996, he began racing street stocks at Thunderhill Speedway in Mayetta, Kansas, and there won the Modified championship in 2000. Bowyer racked up eighteen wins and 32 top-five finishes on his way to capturing the 2001 Modified championships at Lakeside Speedway in Kansas City, Kansas, and Heartland Park Topeka. In 2002, he began racing in the NASCAR Weekly Racing Series, posting nine poles, twelve wins, and 32 top-five finishes en route to a second-place finish in the NASCAR Weekly Racing Series national point standings. He was also crowned the 2002 NASCAR Weekly Racing Series Midwest Champion after another Modified championship at Lakeside Speedway and a Late Model championship at the famed I-70 Speedway in Odessa, Missouri, his first attempt at racing on asphalt.

In 2003, Bowyer raced a full season in the NASCAR AutoZone Elite Division Midwest Series, scoring one top-ten finish in eleven starts. He also would make his first ARCA starts in 2003 and caught the eye of legendary car owner Richard Childress after leading 47 laps and finishing second in his debut at Nashville Superspeedway, driving for Scott Traylor out of Kansas City.

After the second-place finish, Childress called Bowyer by phone and offered him a job. A flabbergasted Bowyer thought he was joking and hung up on him. Childress called back soon afterward and with a not-too-happy tone he still offered the job to Bowyer.

== NASCAR career ==
=== 2004 ===
In 2004, Bowyer began by finishing eighth in the ARCA Re/Max Series race at Daytona in the No. 7 Chevrolet for Scott Traylor. In 2004, Bowyer began running in the Busch Series for Childress, sharing seat time in the No. 21 Reese's -sponsored Chevrolet with veteran Kevin Harvick. He drove in half of the 34 Busch Series races that year, winning one pole at Talladega and seven top-tens, attaining a season-high third place finish in the Federated Auto Parts 300 at Nashville Superspeedway in June. He also ran three races for Kevin Harvick Incorporated with help from Andy Petree Racing driving the No. 33 Chevrolet sponsored by Monaco Coaches and Snap-on. Bowyer made two starts for Bill McAnally Racing in the Camping World West Series in the No. 20 Chevrolet. In his two starts at Phoenix and Auto Club Speedway, he won one pole and had a best finish of second.

=== 2005–2006 ===
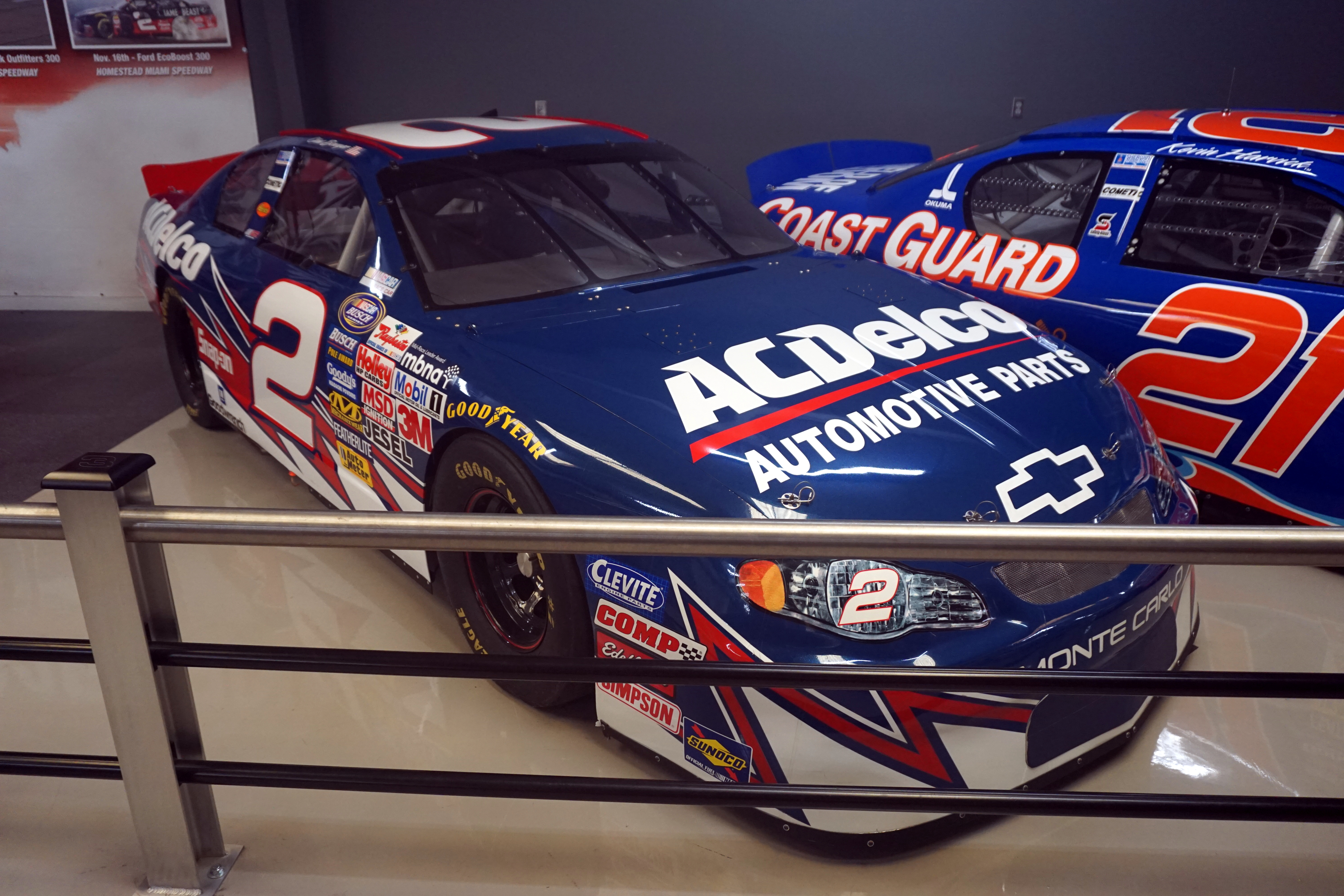
Clint Bowyer's No. 2 ACDelco Chevrolet Monte Carlo

Bowyer's first full Busch season was in 2005, replacing Ron Hornaday in the No. 2 ACDelco-sponsored Chevrolet. He won two poles and two races en route to a second-place finish to repeat as champion Martin Truex Jr., losing by only 68 points. He also made his Nextel Cup debut in the No. 33 Sylvania-sponsored Chevy on April 23, 2005, during the Subway Fresh 500 at Phoenix International Raceway. He finished 22nd as the first car one lap down. Richard Childress Racing announced on October 15, 2005, that Bowyer would race the No. 07 Jack Daniel's-sponsored Chevrolet full-time in the Nextel Cup series, replacing Dave Blaney for the 2006 season.

Bowyer began his rookie Cup season with three top-five finishes and had a total of eleven top-tens that season, with his best finish being a third at California Speedway. He finished 68 points behind Denny Hamlin for NASCAR Rookie of the Year honors. Bowyer also continued to drive the No. 2 in the Busch Series full-time, winning once and finishing third in points. Bowyer won his first Craftsman Truck Series race in the No. 46 Chevrolet Silverado fielded by Morgan-Dollar Motorsports at Texas Motor Speedway on November 3, 2006, in his third career Truck start, making his first CTS start that year at Martinsville for Green Light Racing.

=== 2007 ===
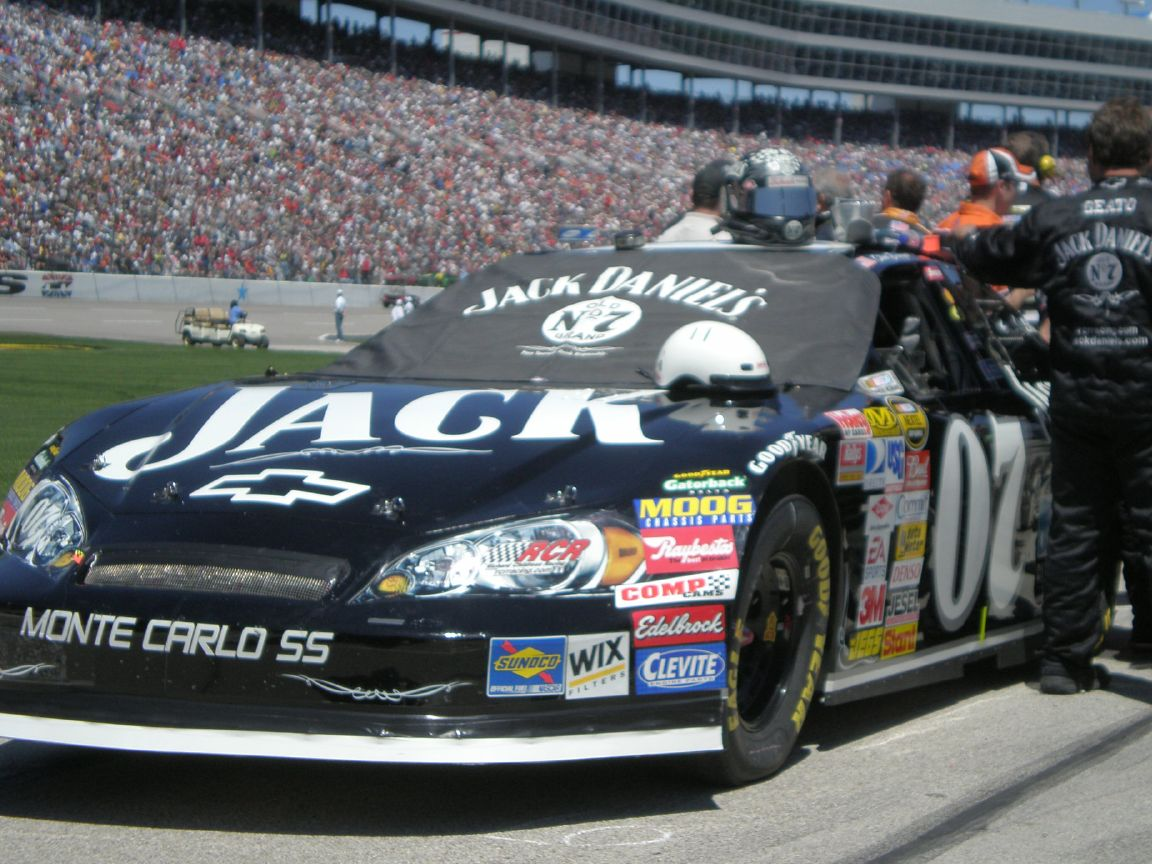
Bowyer's 2007 car

After dramatically starting the 2007 season with a last-lap crash at Daytona (crossing the finish line upside down and on fire as teammate Kevin Harvick won), Bowyer won the Budweiser Pole position for the Dodge Avenger 500 at Darlington Raceway. He finished the regular season ninth in points but was seeded twelfth for the playoff since race wins determine playoff seeding. Bowyer won his second pole at the Sylvania 300 at Loudon, and two days later went on to win his first Nextel Cup race in his 64th start. The win made Bowyer the fifteenth driver to win at least one race in all three of NASCAR's top series.

For the 2007 Busch season, Bowyer ran a partial Busch Series schedule in the RCR No. 2 car. On April 20, 2007, he won the Busch Series Bashas' Supermarkets 200 at Phoenix International Raceway. He followed that up with another Busch Series win on May 4, 2007, in the Circuit City 250 at Richmond International Raceway. Bowyer also ran select races for Kevin Harvick in the NASCAR Craftsman Truck Series.

=== 2008 ===
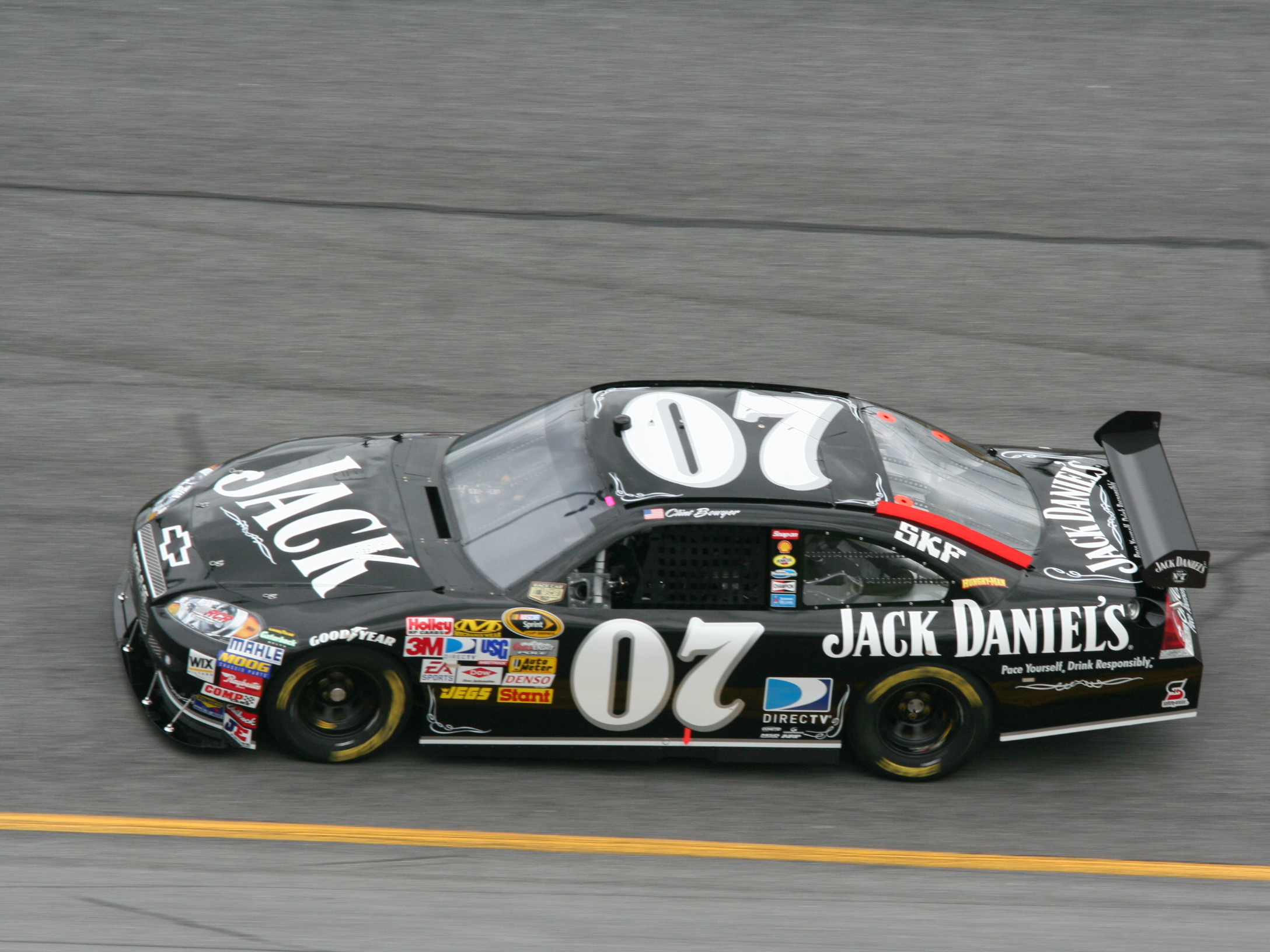
Bowyer's 2008 car

In 2008, Bowyer continued to drive in the Cup and Nationwide Series full-time. Bowyer dominated the late stages of the Daytona 500 but was spun out by Juan Pablo Montoya with seventeen laps remaining. On May 3, 2008, Bowyer earned his second Sprint Cup victory, winning the Crown Royal Presents the Dan Lowry 400 at Richmond International Speedway. Bowyer led only two laps, going to the front after Dale Earnhardt Jr. and Kyle Busch got together with less than four laps remaining in the race.

On August 23, 2008, Bowyer was announced as the driver of the No. 33 Chevrolet Impala SS for RCR. Casey Mears from Hendrick Motorsports replaced Bowyer in the Jack Daniel's-sponsored car. This move was necessitated by a sponsor's request, as General Mills did not want Mears, who had been driving in the 2008 season for rival cereal maker Kellogg's, representing them, so Childress sponsors General Mills and Brown-Forman Corporation (parent company to Jack Daniel's) agreed to the swap so Bowyer, who drove for Brown-Forman, would drive for General Mills, and Mears could drive for Brown-Forman, as they had no problems with Mears representing the company.

On November 15, 2008, Bowyer clinched the NASCAR Nationwide Series Championship at Homestead-Miami Speedway with a narrow margin of victory over Carl Edwards of 21 points. Edwards won the race with Bowyer finishing 5th.

=== 2009: No. 33 car ===
Bowyer concentrated primarily on the Sprint Cup Series in 2009 and drove the No. 33 Chevrolet Impala to 15th place in the season standings. Bowyer trimmed his participation in the Nationwide Series to twelve races but performed well, winning at Daytona (July 3) and Dover (September 26), finishing in the top-five in six of the twelve races, and notching eight top-tens.

Bowyer started the Cup season in strong fashion, finishing fourth in the Daytona 500 and second at Las Vegas in the third race of the year. With a sixth in Atlanta and a fifth in Martinsville, Bowyer was second in the overall standings after six races.

A tough stretch in races seven through twelve dropped Bowyer down to seventeenth overall, 109 points behind Mark Martin in 12th place. After a much more consistent run in races 13-23 (3rd at Pocono in the No. 33 Hartford Racing paint out, eighth at Sonoma, eighth at Michigan), Bowyer had climbed up to fourteenth overall, within 58 points of twelfth place. Finishing in the top fifteen in eight of eleven races helped him make up 51 points on the 12th-place position.

A 21st-place finish the following week (race 24) at Bristol really hurt Bowyer's chance at the Chase, dropping him 112 points behind Matt Kenseth in twelfth with just two races prior to the Chase. It was the 25th race (Pep Boys 500 at Atlanta) that sealed Bowyer's fate, as a spin on lap 309 cost him two laps and the chance to compete in the Chase.

While his chances at the Chase were over, Bowyer finished the season as he started it, with five top-tens and nine top-fifteens in the last eleven races. His top finish was the sixth-place run at Charlotte in the Scary Fast Count Chocula paintout. Overall, Bowyer finished the 2009 Sprint Cup Series in fifteenth place.

=== 2010 ===
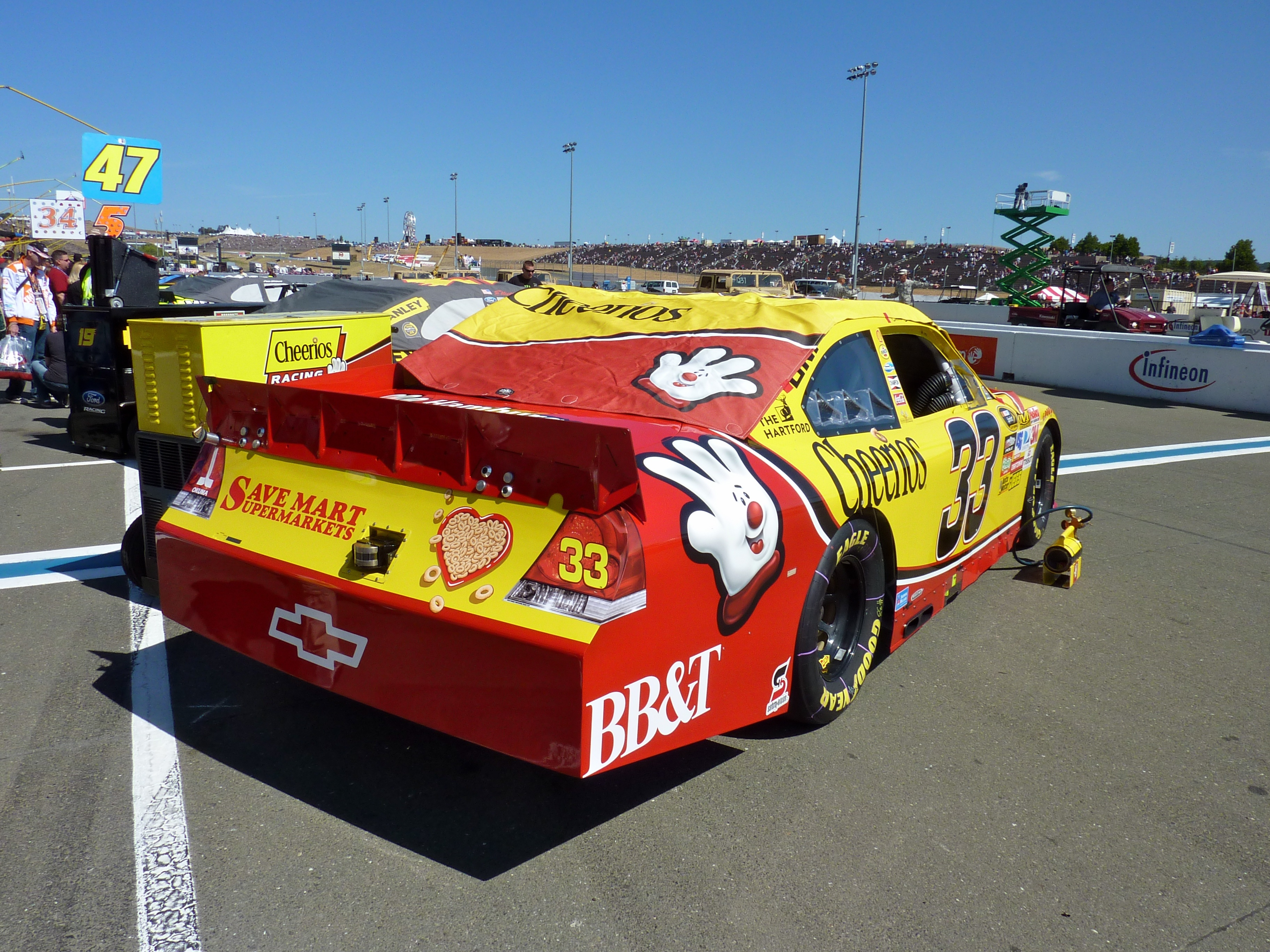
Bowyer's 2010 car at Sonoma Raceway

True to form, Bowyer performed well early in 2010, finishing fourth in Daytona, seventh at Martinsville, and ninth at Phoenix to stand sixth after seven races. However, at Texas in the Samsung Mobile 500 (race 8), Bowyer got caught in a major crash on lap 317 that wiped out eight other drivers and caused a 19-minute red flag race stoppage. The resulting 36th-place finish dropped Bowyer to 14th position overall, only one point behind 12th-place Joey Logano. Seventh- and twelfth place finishes at Talladega and Richmond put Bowyer back into twelfth place after ten races.

The 11th race run at Darlington promised to be special. Bowyer ran the new The Hartford Racing paint out as part of The Hartford's 200th anniversary celebration. As part of Fox's coverage, Bowyer was one of four cars with an in-car camera for the race. However, 101 laps into the race, Bowyer went to the pits and ultimately the garage, with brake issues. After a second long stop to correct, Bowyer finished in 32nd position, 36 laps down.

Bowyer ran well again in races 12 through 14, like seventeenth, seventh, and ninth place finishes allowed him to move back up into 12th-place overall. In race 13 (Coca-Cola 600 at Charlotte), Bowyer led lap 217 following a caution for debris. Kurt Busch passed Bowyer on the following lap and went on to win the race.

In races 15–17, Bowyer finished 22nd at Michigan, 31st at Sonoma, and seventh at Loudon, NH. Despite the poor finish, Bowyer was very competitive at Sonoma. He led lap eighty (of 110) and was in seventh place with eleven laps to go. But on lap 100, Elliott Sadler got bumped by Jeff Gordon and spun Bowyer, dropping him all the way back to 34th place.

Bowyer had one of his strongest runs of the year in the Coke Zero 400 at Daytona, leading seventeen of the final 21 laps. Unfortunately, on the final Green-White restart, Bowyer got split by Jeff Gordon, lost the lead, fell back in the pack, and ultimately spun. In finishing seventeenth, Bowyer fell 49 points behind twelfth place Carl Edwards.

In race 19 at Chicagoland, Bowyer ran well all night, finishing fourth and moving up into twelfth place in the overall standings. He started 15th but moved up quickly, running in the top ten for the first half and then in the top five for most of the latter half of the race, battling Jeff Gordon for the lead with less than forty laps to go.

In the Sylvania 300 at New Hampshire Motor Speedway, Bowyer started second and led the most laps before fading back into the Top 5. Taking the white flag in the second position, he suddenly witnessed then-leader Tony Stewart run out of fuel, giving Bowyer the third win of his Sprint Cup career and vaulting him to second in the Chase standings behind Denny Hamlin. However, this was negated during post-race inspection at NASCAR's R&D center. Reports surfaced that Bowyer's car, used at Richmond, had come close to failing inspection. NASCAR announced on September 22 that it had issued fines and penalties to the No. 33 team after failing a secondary inspection. Most critically, crew chief Shane Wilson was suspended for the next 6 races, and both Bowyer and car owner Richard Childress faced $150,000 in fines and the loss of 150 championship points. The penalty dropped Bowyer back to 12th in points, 185 points behind Denny Hamlin. Childress appealed the decision, which reduced the suspensions to four races and $100,000, but the 150-point deduction was upheld.

During the Pepsi Max 400 weekend at Fontana, Bowyer and fellow Childress driver Austin Dillon taped an episode of The Price Is Right that was scheduled to feature NASCAR-themed Showcases (a practice that occurs during a Fontana race, host Drew Carey was the grand marshal of the August 2008 race) and aired on November 15, 2010. Bowyer finished second to Tony Stewart in the race.

Bowyer barely edged teammate Kevin Harvick for the victory in the fall Talladega race, the AMP Energy Juice 500. The race ended with the leaders in turn one when a caution was displayed for a large wreck on the front straightaway on the final lap.

Bowyer finished tenth in the final Chase standings, earning him a spot on stage at the season-ending Awards Banquet.

=== 2011: Final season at RCR ===
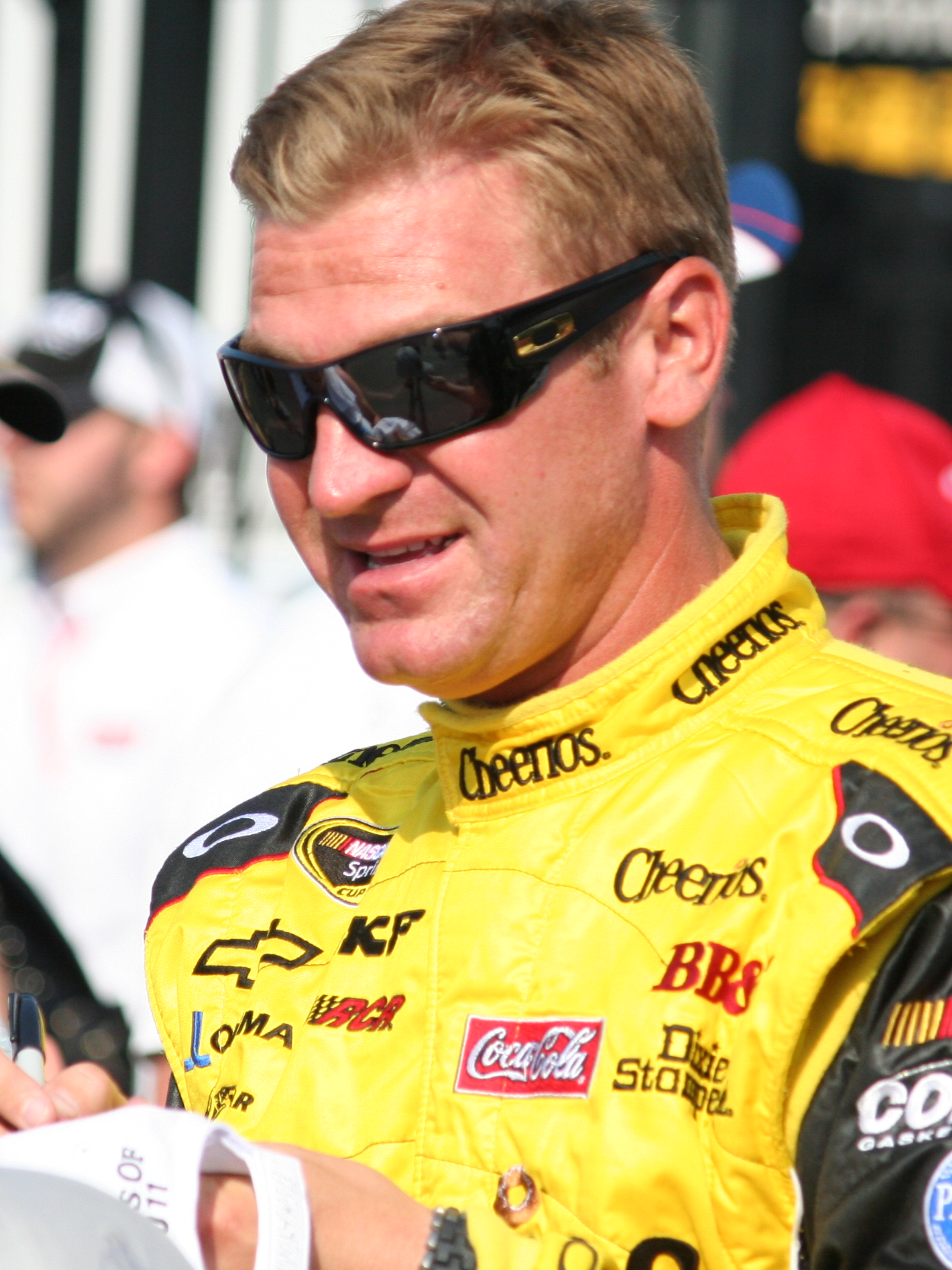
Bowyer at the 2011 Coca-Cola 600

Bowyer started off the 2011 season strong in the Budweiser shootout practice sessions, and he and his teammates regularly sat on top of the pylon. In the race, he and Jeff Burton led many laps but faded to tenth at the end (9th due to Denny Hamlin being penalized for going below the yellow line).

Bowyer qualified fifth for the Daytona 500 and finished 2nd to teammate Jeff Burton in the second Gatorade duel by 0.005 seconds. They together dominated that race. In the Daytona 500, Bowyer teamed up with many drivers throughout the day, including Jeff Burton, Paul Menard (his new RCR teammate), Dale Earnhardt Jr., and Kyle Busch. After Burton's engine let go, Bowyer found himself getting a push from Kyle Busch. With four laps to go, Kurt Busch got into the back of Regan Smith, which turned him up in front of Bowyer. Ryan Newman was also involved. Bowyer was able to salvage a seventeenth-place finish out of it, mainly because of the big pileups earlier in the race. He had led 31 laps.

In the next race at Phoenix, Bowyer was taken out early in a multi-car crash on the backstretch. The Helping Hands (his pit crew) were able to repair the car fairly quickly, and he was able to finish 27th.

In the 2011 Aaron's 499 at Talladega, Bowyer led the most laps with 38 and was being pushed by Kevin Harvick on the last lap, dueling with Hendrick drivers Jeff Gordon and Mark Martin. Approaching the tri-oval, Jimmie Johnson and Dale Earnhardt Jr. squeezed to the far inside, and Johnson beat Bowyer to the line by 0.002 seconds (less than a foot) in a four-wide finish, tied with the finish of Ricky Craven over Kurt Busch in the 2003 Carolina Dodge Dealers 400 for closest finish in Sprint Cup history.

At Dover, in the Nationwide series, Bowyer was involved in a major crash on the last lap, with Bowyer going on his side. He and no one else were injured. Running third at the time, Bowyer was collected by Joey Logano (who was revealed through replays to have gotten loose on his own and overcorrected into the outside wall with no help from race winner Carl Edwards), after which he was then hit by a few other cars behind him.

At New Hampshire, Bowyer led 49 of the last 51 laps and seemed to be on the road to victory, but with two laps to go, in a bizarre twist of fate, Tony Stewart passed him to win in a role reversal from the 2010 race.

On October 7, 2011, Bowyer signed a three-year contract to race the No. 15 Toyota for Michael Waltrip Racing, starting in 2012.

Bowyer did not make the Chase, but he won the Chase race at Talladega for the 2nd consecutive year, pulling a slingshot on Burton out of turn 4 on the final lap of the race. The margin of victory was 0.018 seconds. It was his last win with Richard Childress Racing.

=== 2012: First season at MWR ===
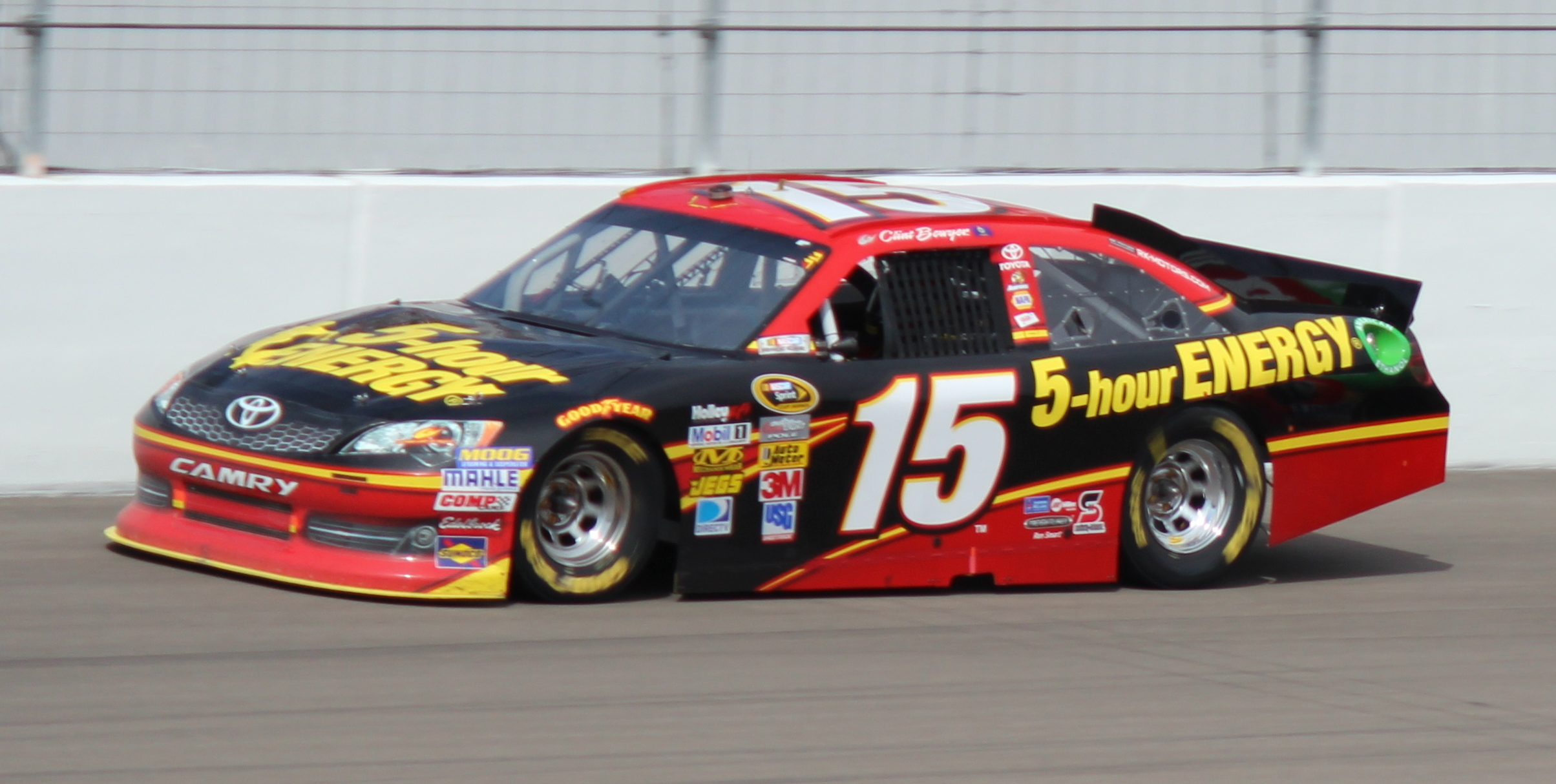
Bowyer's No. 15 during the 2012 Kobalt Tools 400

The 2012 season marked a new beginning for Bowyer as he moved from Richard Childress Racing to Michael Waltrip Racing, signing a three-year deal. Improvements at Michael Waltrip Racing with the addition of former RCR director of competition Scott Miller and veteran driver Mark Martin as a teammate translated into Bowyer's best season statistically in the Sprint Cup Series.

Bowyer's 2012 season began sourly, as his Daytona 500 qualifying time was disallowed, and he also ran out of fuel under green when he missed pit road during the 500. In March, he ended up starting a year-long rivalry with Jeff Gordon at the Martinsville race. Gordon's team, Hendrick Motorsports, was going for its two-hundredth victory at the team's statistically best track. On a late green-white-checkered restart with two laps to go, Gordon was running first with Hendrick teammate Jimmie Johnson in second and Bowyer third. Bowyer dove to the low side and made it three wide going into turn one, sending all three spinning around and giving the win to Ryan Newman. Bowyer apologized for the contact, but later incidents at other 2012 races led to a heated rivalry.

In June, at the Toyota/Save Mart 350 at Sonoma, California, Bowyer dominated the race, scoring his first road course victory as well as his first MWR win by holding off Tony Stewart and Kurt Busch. At the AdvoCare 500 at Atlanta, Bowyer suffered battery issues but still managed to clinch a Chase berth with a 27th-place finish. He rebounded the following week at the Federated Auto Parts 400 at Richmond, winning the race using fuel strategy despite being spun by Juan Pablo Montoya mid-race.

Bowyer's two wins positioned him sixth at the start of the Chase for the Sprint Cup. In the Chase, he won at Charlotte after Brad Keselowski made a late-race pit stop.

Coming to the white flag at the AdvoCare 500 (Phoenix) on November 11, 2012, Bowyer's rivalry with Jeff Gordon came to a head. Earlier in the race, Bowyer accidentally put Gordon into the wall. Gordon was then black-flagged for a failed attempt to cut Bowyer's tire. On the next-to-last lap, Gordon decided enough was enough and responded by intentionally wrecking Bowyer in turn three, collecting Joey Logano and Aric Almirola. After Gordon's car was parked behind his team's hauler, a member of Bowyer's team shoved Gordon from behind, and both teams scuffled. After Bowyer entered the pit area with his damaged car and noticed his team was not in his pit stall, he sprinted towards Gordon's hauler, attempting to enter it before being restrained by a single NASCAR official. The incident knocked Bowyer down to fourth place in the points standings and mathematically ended Bowyer's chance of winning the Championship. Bowyer was not penalized for his involvement in the fight, but his crew chief, Brian Pattie, was fined $35,000 after he expressed his displeasure with Gordon by using profanity on national television, forcing ESPN to apologize to viewers.

The following week, Bowyer rebounded, finished second at Homestead (ironically behind Gordon), and completed the season with a career-best second-place finish in the final points, passing Jimmie Johnson by one point, who was eliminated with a drive train malfunction. In victory lane at the race, Jeff Gordon apologized for his behavior at Phoenix and moved on from the incident.

=== 2013 ===
Bowyer started out 2013 by participating in the Rolex 24 Hours of Daytona, driving a Ferrari 458 with AF Corse/Michael Waltrip Racing. The team finished 16th overall and 7th in class.

At Richmond International Raceway on September 7, 2013, Bowyer became the subject of controversy as, late in the race, his No. 15 Toyota spun; accusations were made that the spin was intentional, as part of an effort by MWR to ensure that Martin Truex Jr. qualified for the Chase for the Sprint Cup. NASCAR president Mike Helton stated the following morning that scoring officials on the scene did not believe the spin was intentional, but that NASCAR was reviewing the incident. The following Monday evening, NASCAR docked all three MWR teams, including Bowyer, fifty driver/owner points. MWR was also fined $300,000. Despite the large penalty, Bowyer retained enough points to remain in the Chase. He had already clinched a spot in the Chase at the Irwin Tools Night Race.

=== 2014 ===
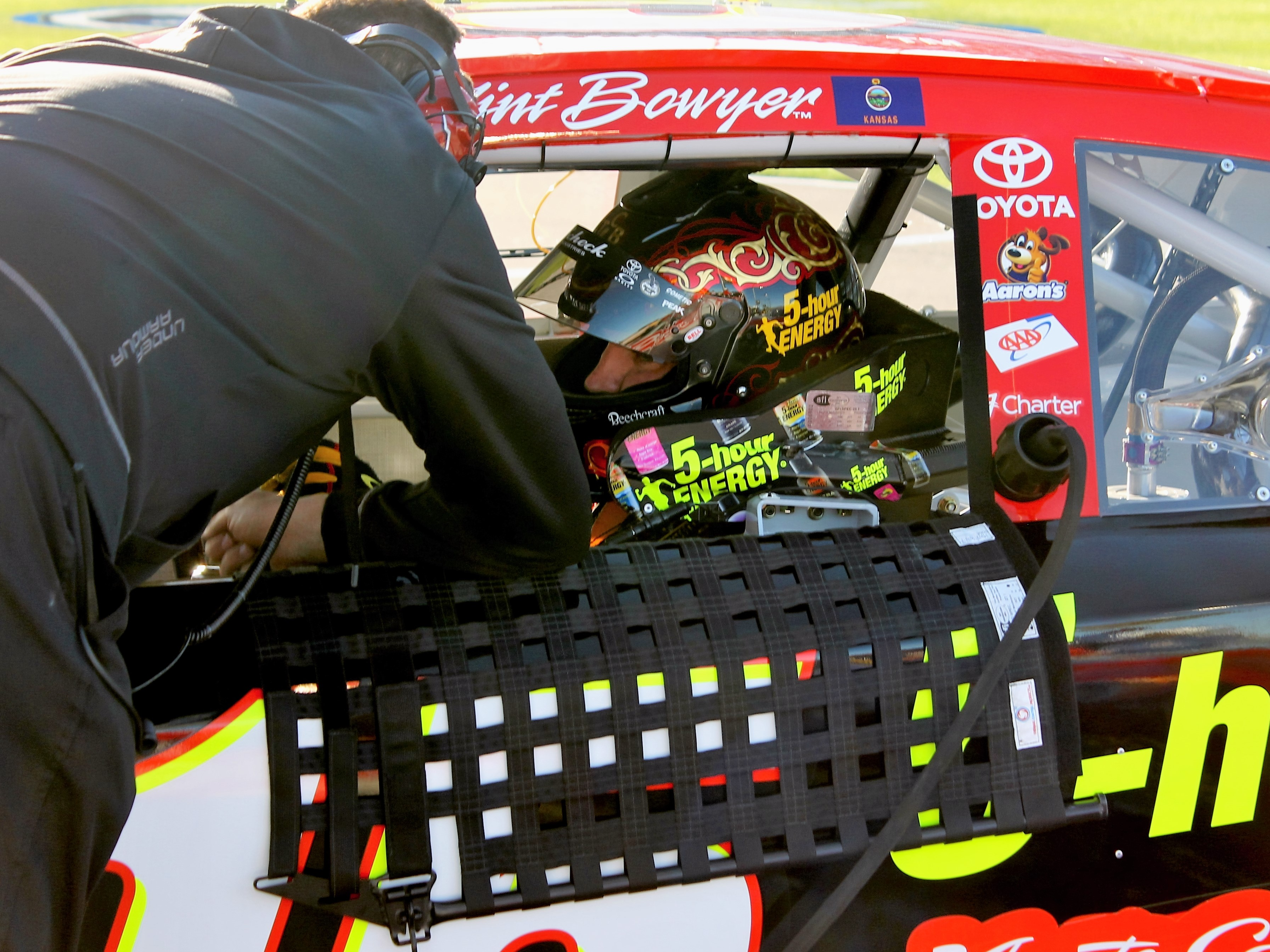
Bowyer at Las Vegas Motor Speedway in 2014

Bowyer did not participate in the Sprint Unlimited as he did not win a pole during the 2013 season. His season started on a wild note when Bowyer was involved in a last-lap crash of the second race in the Budweiser Duels, with Bowyer's car being sent airborne and performing a barrel roll before landing on its wheels.

At Darlington, Bowyer was the center of controversy when he got some contact with Kurt Busch. While racing Busch for a top-ten spot, Bowyer drove into the back of Kurt Busch, who spun out and wrecked. Busch replied by waving his hands in frustration at Bowyer under yellow. In a post-race interview, Bowyer apologized, stating, "You never want to wreck anybody. It was quite clear I got into the back of him and wrecked him."

Two weeks later at Richmond, Bowyer tried to move to the lead on lap one but tapped pole-sitter Kyle Larson, which forced Larson to drive from 43rd for a recovery. Later, his car caught fire on pit road during a pit stop.

After an Atlanta engine blowup, Bowyer's hopes to make the Chase by consistency were dashed, and the next week, Bowyer missed the Chase by a slim three points. He would finish 19th in points

In the Texas Nationwide race, Bowyer replaced Elliott Sadler on lap seven due to a stomach illness; Bowyer qualified for Sadler for the race.

=== 2015: Final season at MWR ===
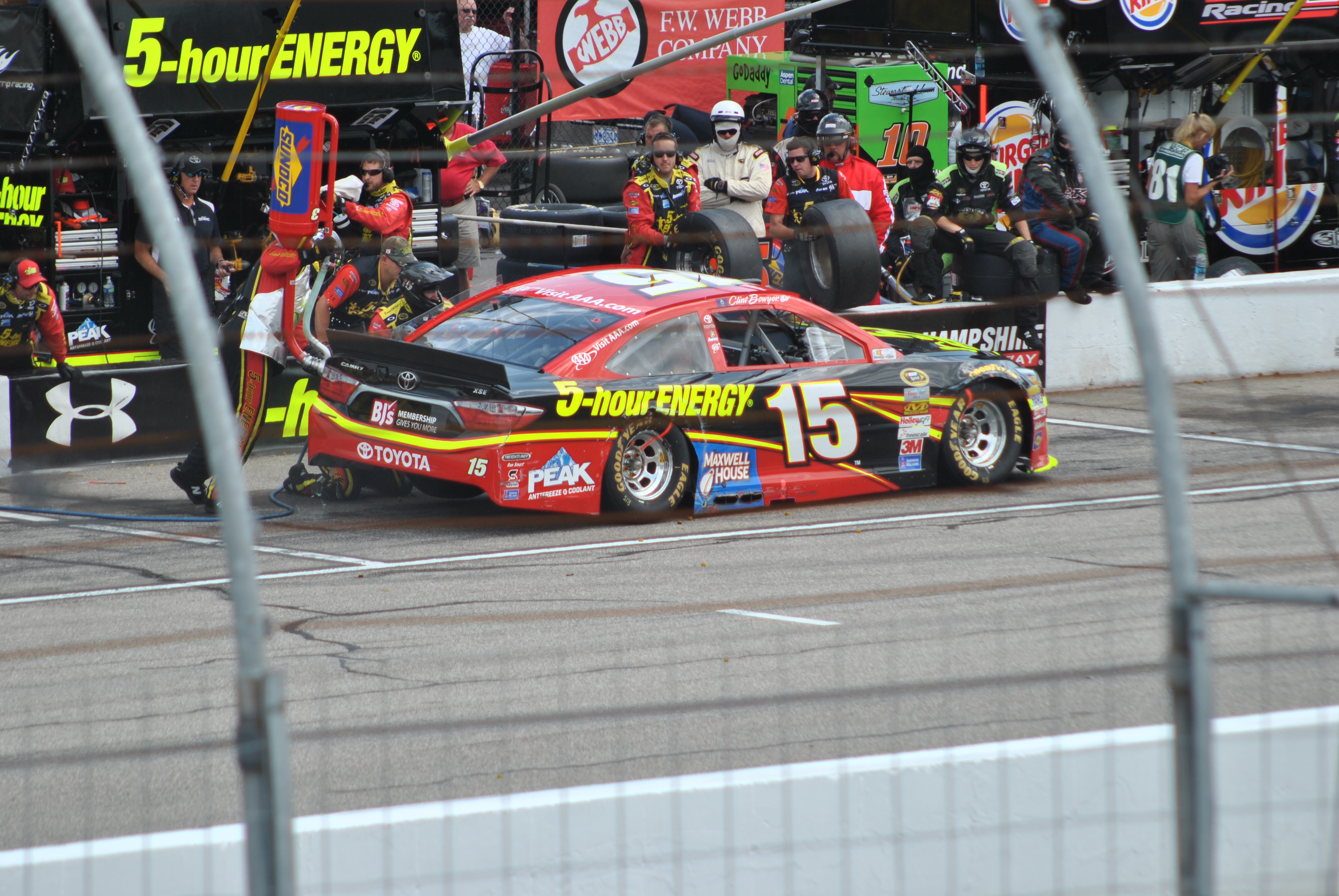
Bowyer on pit road at New Hampshire Motor Speedway in 2015

Bowyer started off the season with a top-ten at Daytona. Despite having a few top tens throughout the year, on August 19, 2015, it was announced that Bowyer and MWR would part ways after the season ended, with MWR not fielding full-time teams in 2016. On September 30, 2015, it was announced that Tony Stewart (Stewart–Haas Racing) would retire from the NASCAR Sprint Cup series after the 2016 season and negotiated a contract which will allow Bowyer to drive the No. 14 car in the 2017 season. On October 2, 2015, it was announced that Bowyer would move to HScott Motorsports for the 2016 season, replacing Justin Allgaier before making his transition to Stewart–Haas Racing the following season. On December 15, 2015, a leaked photo on Twitter showed that Bowyer would bring over his No. 15 and 5-Hour-Energy sponsorship from Michael Waltrip Racing to HScott Motorsports for his lone season with them. Bowyer made the Chase due to having enough points to qualify, but his Chase was hit heavily by a 25-driver and owner points penalty, a $75,000 fine, and the suspension of crew chief Billy Scott for three races. Bowyer appealed the penalties, but they were upheld by the appeals panel. With the penalty, Bowyer didn't advance to the second round of the Chase.

In his last season with MWR, Bowyer was winless, scored just twelve top-tens, and finished sixteenth in the championship.

=== 2016 ===
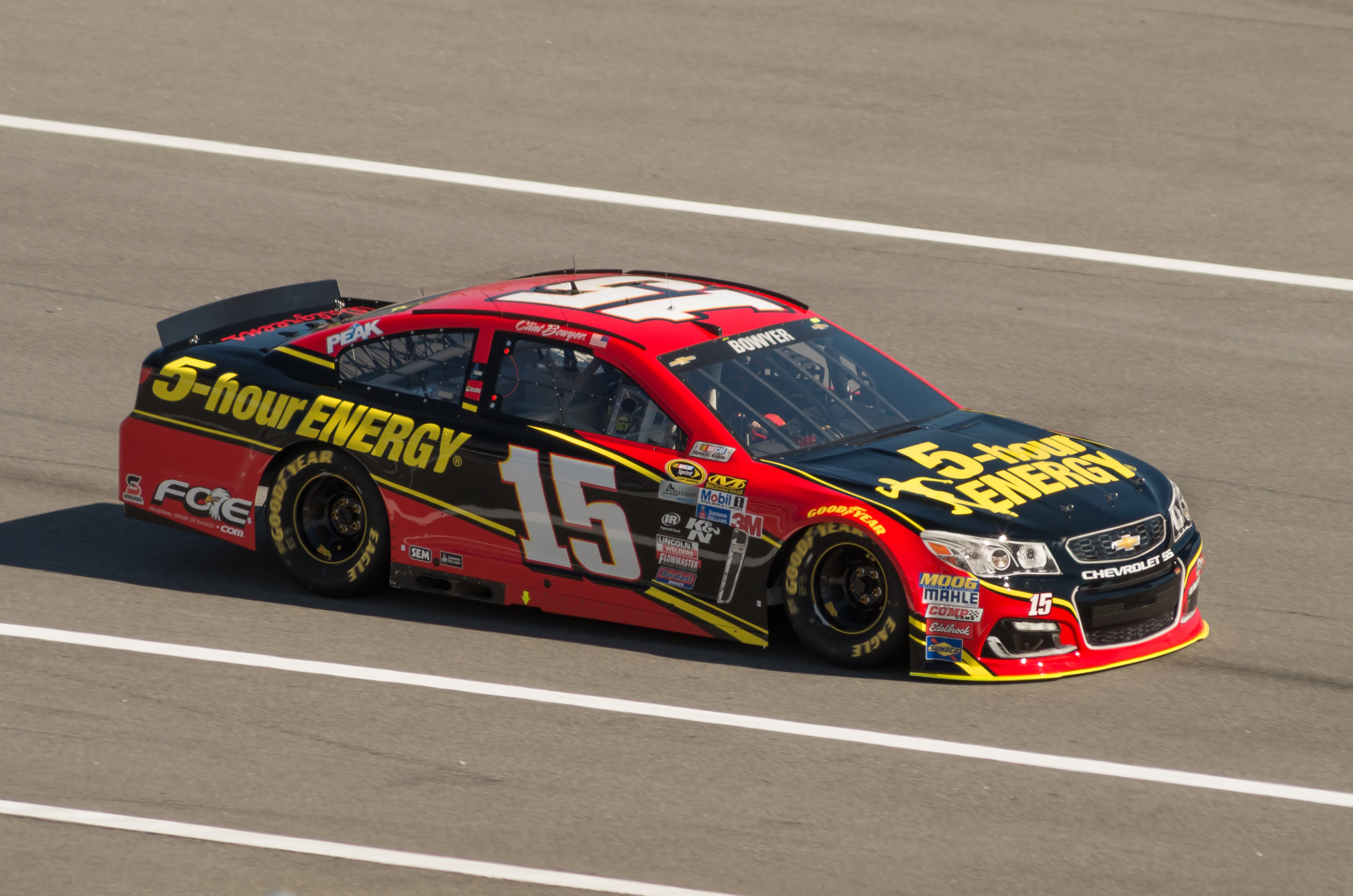
Bowyer's 2016 car at Daytona International Speedway

Bowyer started the season on a low note, finishing 33rd after a loose wheel at Daytona. Bowyer struggled at Atlanta with his car down a cylinder, finishing 35th. Bowyer had some poor finishes, including a 38th-place finish at Texas, where he left the garage after the car was repairable. Bowyer later had his first top-ten finish this season, coming at Bristol with an eighth-place finish. Two weeks later, Bowyer finished a season-best seventh-place finish after avoiding massive crashes at Talladega. Coming back to Daytona, Bowyer would avoid crashes to finish ninth. Bowyer ended the season winless and with no top-fives, with only three top-tens and finishing 27th in the point standings.

Bowyer returned to the Nationwide Series, now known as the Xfinity Series, at Chicagoland, driving the No. 88 for JR Motorsports. He ended up starting the race in seventh and finishing the race in sixth.

=== 2017: First season at Stewart–Haas Racing ===
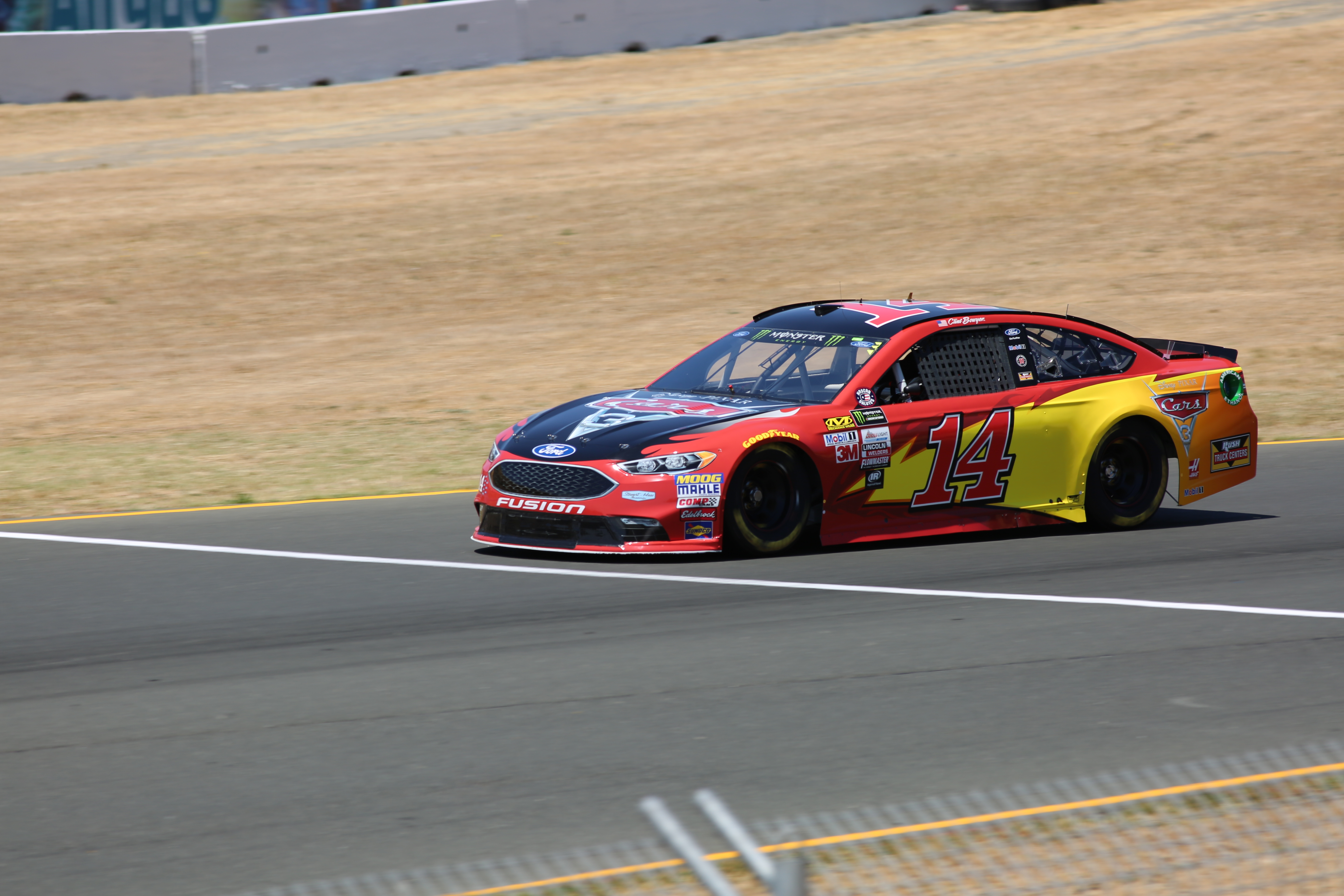
Bowyer during qualifying for the 2017 Toyota/Save Mart 350

With Tony Stewart's retirement, Bowyer moved from the No. 15 HSM Chevy to the No. 14 Stewart–Haas Racing Ford Fusion. Bowyer started the season with a second-place finish in the second Can-Am Duel. Bowyer got his first top-ten at Las Vegas with a tenth-place finish. Bowyer had a significantly better race at Auto Club, finishing third and second at Bristol several races later. After no top fives, seven races later, he finished second at Sonoma behind teammate Kevin Harvick, giving Stewart–Haas Racing its second-ever 1-2 finish for the first time since 2011. Bowyer finished second again at the Coke Zero 400 at Daytona the following week. Deja vu happened as a mechanical issue in the Southern 500 at Darlington put Bowyer in a must-win situation at Richmond (just like in 2014) to make the Playoffs. He finished 24th after contact with Matt Kenseth as Kenseth avoided an ambulance at the entry of pit road while under caution and eighteenth in the final points standings.

=== 2018 ===
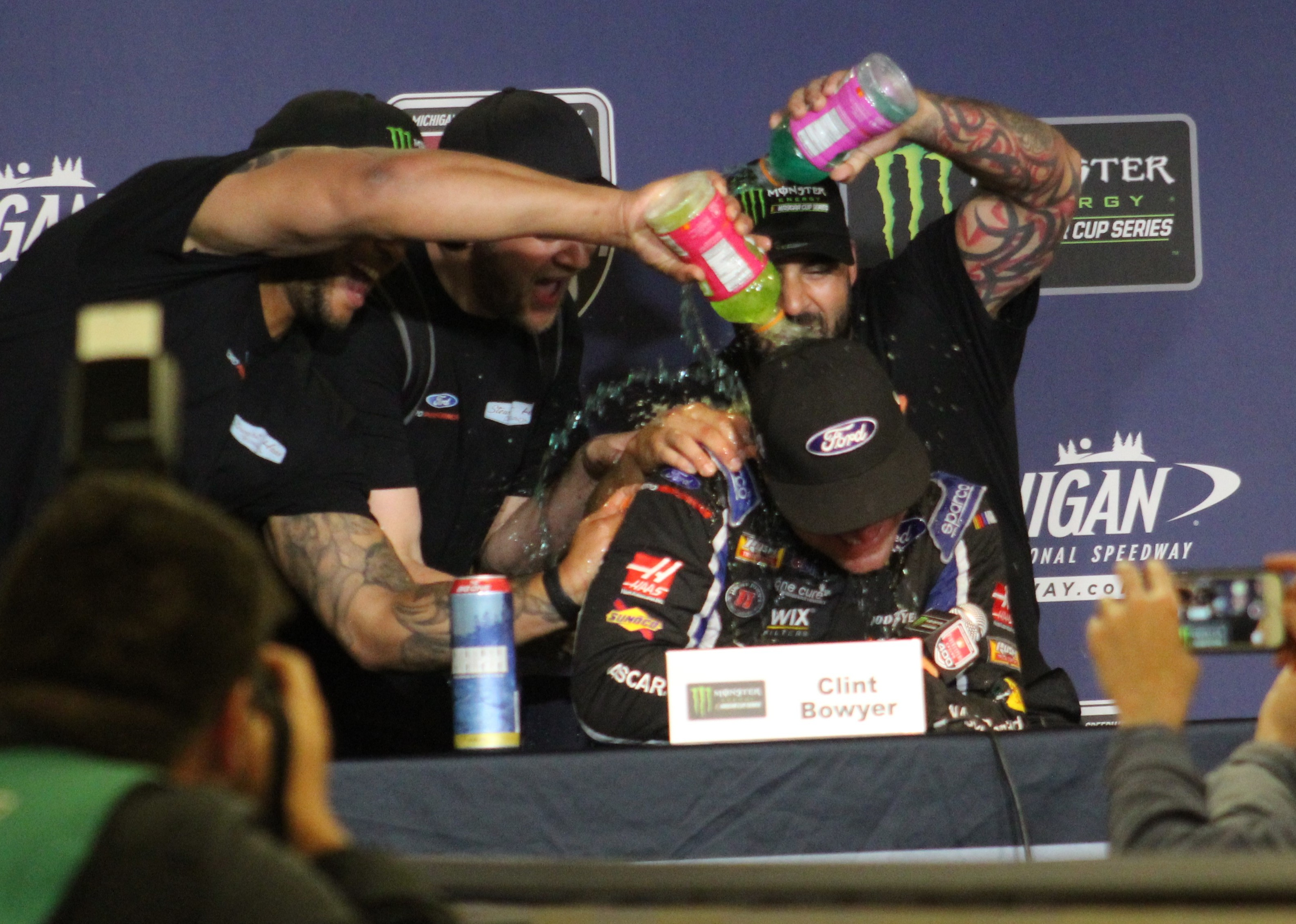
Bowyer and his crew celebrating after winning the 2018 FireKeepers Casino 400

Bowyer got off to a strong start in 2018, posting top-fifteen finishes in four of the first five events, including a third-place finish at the Atlanta race. On March 26, 2018, he broke a 190-race winless streak with a victory at the spring Martinsville race, which gave him his first Playoff run since 2015. Bowyer then scored his second win of the season at the rain-shortened June Michigan race. Despite bad finishes at Las Vegas and Dover, he has stayed consistent in the Playoffs, advancing to the Round of 8 before a crash at Phoenix eliminated him from the Playoffs. Bowyer finished the season twelfth in points.

=== 2019 ===
At the conclusion of the 2019 Monster Energy NASCAR All-Star Race, Bowyer chopped Ryan Newman's nose, which sent Bowyer into the wall during the cool-down lap. Following the race, Bowyer attacked Newman on pit road. Both drivers were called to the NASCAR hauler, but neither was penalized for the incident. During an autograph session at a Bass Pro Shops store on May 23, 2019, a fan brought a pair of boxing gloves for both drivers to sign. Despite a string of inconsistent finishes and no wins during the season, Bowyer managed to make the 2019 playoffs after finishing fifth at Indianapolis. On September 14, 2019, Bowyer won the pole at Las Vegas, his first pole since 2007. He finished fourth at the Charlotte Roval to advance to the Round of 12. Bowyer was eliminated in the Round of 12 after the Kansas race. He finished ninth in the final points standings despite not reaching victory lane as he did the season prior, his first top ten points finish since 2013. On December 4, 2019, Stewart–Haas Racing announced that Johnny Klausmeier would replace Mike Bugarewicz as the crew chief of the No. 14 team in 2020.

=== 2020: Final full-time season ===
In March, Bowyer edged out Jimmie Johnson to win the pole for the Auto Club 400, the fourth of his career. He finished the race in 23rd place, one lap down. After accumulating seven top-ten finishes, including a runner-up finish at the spring Bristol race (his 82nd and final top-five), Bowyer qualified for the 2020 NASCAR Cup Series playoffs. On October 8, 2020, Bowyer revealed that he would be joining the Fox Sports broadcast booth for the 2021 season, stepping from the driver's seat. Bowyer was eliminated from the playoffs after the round of 12. Bowyer scored his 226th and final top-ten at Martinsville and finished 14th at the season finale at Phoenix in his final race the following week. He finished twelfth in the points standings in his final season. Bowyer also co-hosted a podcast, Rubbin is Racing, with Dave Portnoy on Barstool Sports.

=== 2024: Return to racing ===
On May 29, 2024, it was announced that Bowyer would drive the No. 7 Spire Motorsports truck at Nashville after an eight-year hiatus from the truck series.

== Clint Bowyer Racing ==
Bowyer started his own Dirt Late Model team, Clint Bowyer Racing, in 2008. Well-established veteran Shannon Babb of Mowequa, IL, was behind the wheel of Clint's Rocket Chassis, and had a very solid season. Babb left to form his own team at the end of 2008, due to wanting to run more of an "outlaw" type schedule, and wanting to race closer to home to be with his family. For the 2009 season, the 2005 World 100 Champion Dale McDowell (who ironically inherited the win via Babb being light at the scales) took over the seat, and the number was changed to Dale's signature No. 17M Jared Landers also drives for the team in the No. 5 late model.

The team elected to run the Lucas Oil Late Model Dirt Series full-time in 2009, choosing to run Warrior Racecars, with help from Warrior's owner, Sanford Goddard. Winning two races and finishing fourth in the points standings, it was a decent season. Since then, the 17M has become a staple of the Lucas Oil Series, continuing on the 2010 tour. Clint Bowyer Racing also has fielded cars in Tony Stewart's Prelude to the Dream in 2008 (Bowyer, second and Jimmie Johnson, tenth) and 2010 (Johnson won, Bowyer second). Both years, these were also Warrior Racecars.

Clint Bowyer Racing fielded a car for Clint in 2011 for the UNOH DIRTcar Nationals. A victory in a feature night race helped Clint secure the overall modified championship in the event. In 2014, Clint Bowyer Racing won its first Lucas Oil Dirt Late Model Championship with Don O'Neal driving the No. 5 Peak Performance car.

In 2016, after Clint Bowyer's lowest-ranking season with HScott Motorsports, Clint Bowyer and Clint Bowyer Racing filed a lawsuit against Harry Scott, Jr., charging him with breach of contract and fraud. The team charged that Bowyer brought some former MWR sponsors to the team and that HScott missed monthly payments for Bowyer's driving services in October and November 2016. Bowyer also alleged that the team was using money owed to him to pay off their creditors. Upon filing the suit, Bowyer received a temporary court order against HScott Motorsports, ordering them to hold onto at least 2.2 million pending the lawsuit. The lawsuit was quickly settled out of court, less than a week later, in a "mutual, amicable, confidential settlement."

== Personal life ==
In April 2014, Bowyer married Lorra, and the couple has two children. He is an avid fan of the Kansas City Royals of MLB, the Kansas City Chiefs of the NFL, and the University of Kansas Jayhawks of the NCAA.

=== 2022 car accident ===
Bowyer was absent from Fox's final Cup Series broadcast of the season at Sonoma on June 12, 2022. Larry McReynolds had replaced him in the booth for practice/qualifying and the race. Jordan Bianchi from The Athletic reported that Bowyer was "handling a personal matter" and would miss the race weekend. On June 16, 2022, WDAF-TV reported that on June 5, 2022, at 9:00 p.m. Bowyer had hit a woman when driving home from the Cup Series race at Gateway earlier in the day. The incident took place on an exit ramp near Osage Beach, Missouri. The woman was pronounced dead and presumed to be under the influence. An investigation revealed that the woman was walking along the exit ramp against the flow of traffic when she was struck by Bowyer's car. Furthermore, police found a bag of a crystalline substance among her personal items. A man questioned at a nearby campground said he and the woman used meth and alcohol earlier that day.

=== Charity work ===
On May 6, 2008, Clint Bowyer attended and hosted the first annual Clint Bowyer Charity Golf Event in his hometown of Emporia, Kansas. It raised $160,000 for the Emporia Community Foundation to "make Emporia a better place."

While Bowyer was in Emporia for one of his golf tournaments for charity, he had the idea to raise money for and build a community center. Bowyer dedicated the building on March 12, 2012. Bowyer says he envisions the building being used for anything from business meetings to weddings to concerts, and he was constructed with flexibility in mind. The new Bowyer Community Building is located at the Lyon County Fairgrounds, which is on Highway 50 in Emporia.

=== TV appearances ===
Bowyer made a guest appearance on an episode of A&E's Duck Dynasty in 2012 on an episode titled "Drag Me To Glory". Bowyer was featured in the episode using his customized camouflage limousine in a race with the show's star, Willie Robertson, who was using a similar limousine. In 2015, he co-hosted an episode of Diners, Drive-ins and Dives with Guy Fieri where they went around Charlotte to find the best food spots.

In June 2019, Bowyer was a color commentator for the Fox NASCAR broadcast of the Xfinity race at Pocono. Part of a Cup drivers-only coverage, he worked alongside Kevin Harvick and Joey Logano in the broadcast booth.

On October 8, 2020, Bowyer revealed that he would be joining the Fox Sports broadcast booth full-time for the 2021 season, stepping away from the driver's seat.

== Motorsports career results ==
=== NASCAR ===
(key) (Bold – Pole position awarded by qualifying time. Italics – Pole position earned by points standings or practice time. * – Most laps led.)

==== Cup Series ====
NASCAR Cup Series results
Year	Team	No.	Make	1	2	3	4	5	6	7	8	9	10	11	12	13	14	15	16	17	18	19	20	21	22	23	24	25	26	27	28	29	30	31	32	33	34	35	36	NCSC	Pts	Ref
2005	Richard Childress Racing	33	Chevy	DAY	CAL	LVS	ATL	BRI	MAR	TEX	PHO; 22	TAL	DAR	RCH	CLT	DOV	POC	MCH	SON	DAY	CHI	NHA	POC	IND	GLN	MCH	BRI	CAL	RCH	NHA	DOV	TAL	KAN	CLT	MAR	ATL	TEX	PHO	HOM	69th	97	
2006	Richard Childress Racing	07	Chevy	DAY; 6	CAL; 14	LVS; 15	ATL; 27	BRI; 29	MAR; 22	TEX; 19	PHO; 5	TAL; 40	RCH; 10	DAR; 23	CLT; 19	DOV; 17	POC; 21	MCH; 39	SON; 16	DAY; 10	CHI; 9	NHA; 27	POC; 41	IND; 4	GLN; 14	MCH; 33	BRI; 38	CAL; 3	RCH; 12	NHA; 24	DOV; 8	KAN; 9	TAL; 35	CLT; 23	MAR; 23	ATL; 25	TEX; 5	PHO; 33	HOM; 10	17th	3833	
2007	Richard Childress Racing	07	Chevy	DAY; 18	CAL; 6	LVS; 36	ATL; 6	BRI; 8	MAR; 11	TEX; 16	PHO; 22	TAL; 35	RCH; 9	**DAR**; 9	CLT; 29	DOV; 8	POC; 10	MCH; 16	SON; 4	NHA; 37	DAY; 7*	CHI; 10	IND; 13	POC; 8	GLN; 16	MCH; 17	BRI; 3	CAL; 20	RCH; 12	**NHA**; 1*	DOV; 12	KAN; 2	TAL; 11	CLT; 2	MAR; 9	ATL; 6	TEX; 19	PHO; 11	HOM; 39	3rd	6377	
2008	Richard Childress Racing	07	Chevy	DAY; 24	CAL; 19	LVS; 28	ATL; 6	BRI; 3	MAR; 10	TEX; 10	PHO; 2	TAL; 9	RCH; 1	DAR; 15	CLT; 25	DOV; 36	POC; 39	MCH; 26	SON; 4	NHA; 22	DAY; 9	CHI; 22	IND; 19	POC; 6	GLN; 23	MCH; 20	BRI; 7	CAL; 10	RCH; 12	NHA; 12	DOV; 8	KAN; 12	TAL; 5	CLT; 12	MAR; 9	ATL; 20	TEX; 4	PHO; 12	HOM; 5	5th	6381	
2009	Richard Childress Racing	33	Chevy	DAY; 4	CAL; 19	LVS; 2	ATL; 6	BRI; 13	MAR; 5	TEX; 22	PHO; 26	TAL; 39	RCH; 18	DAR; 37	CLT; 36	DOV; 11	POC; 12	MCH; 10	SON; 8	NHA; 20	DAY; 29	CHI; 9	IND; 18	POC; 3	GLN; 9	MCH; 8	BRI; 21	ATL; 29	RCH; 6	NHA; 10	DOV; 15	KAN; 21	CAL; 9	CLT; 6	MAR; 19	TAL; 12	TEX; 7	PHO; 7	HOM; 11	15th	4359	
2010	Richard Childress Racing	33	Chevy	DAY; 4	CAL; 8	LVS; 8	ATL; 23	BRI; 40	MAR; 7	PHO; 9	TEX; 36	TAL; 7	RCH; 12	DAR; 32	DOV; 17	CLT; 7	POC; 9	MCH; 22	SON; 31	NHA; 7	DAY; 17	CHI; 4	IND; 4	POC; 15	GLN; 32	MCH; 13	BRI; 4	ATL; 7	RCH; 6	NHA; 1*	DOV; 25	KAN; 15	CAL; 2	CLT; 17	MAR; 38	TAL; 1	TEX; 7	PHO; 21	HOM; 12	10th	6155	
2011	Richard Childress Racing	33	Chevy	DAY; 17	PHO; 27	LVS; 15	BRI; 35	CAL; 7	MAR; 9	TEX; 2	TAL; 2*	RCH; 6	DAR; 31	DOV; 6	CLT; 15	KAN; 18	POC; 16	MCH; 8	SON; 4	DAY; 36	KEN; 35	NHA; 17	IND; 13	POC; 18	GLN; 11	MCH; 8	BRI; 26	ATL; 36	RCH; 22	CHI; 7	NHA; 26	DOV; 8	KAN; 7	CLT; 24	TAL; 1	MAR; 19	TEX; 9	PHO; 10	HOM; 6	13th	1047	
2012	Michael Waltrip Racing	15	Toyota	DAY; 11	PHO; 30	LVS; 6	BRI; 4	CAL; 13	MAR; 10	TEX; 17	KAN; 36	RCH; 7	TAL; 6	DAR; 11	CLT; 14	DOV; 6	POC; 7	MCH; 8	SON; 1*	KEN; 16	DAY; 29	NHA; 3	IND; 15	POC; 8	GLN; 4	MCH; 7	BRI; 7	ATL; 27	RCH; 1	CHI; 10	NHA; 4	DOV; 9	TAL; 23	CLT; 1	KAN; 6	MAR; 5	TEX; 6	PHO; 28	HOM; 2	2nd	2361	
2013	Michael Waltrip Racing	15	Toyota	DAY; 11	PHO; 6	LVS; 27	BRI; 5	CAL; 35	MAR; 2	TEX; 15	KAN; 5	RCH; 2	TAL; 18	DAR; 11	CLT; 8	DOV; 6	POC; 15	MCH; 7	SON; 5	KEN; 3	DAY; 4	NHA; 13	IND; 20	POC; 14	GLN; 6	MCH; 5	BRI; 14	ATL; 39	RCH; 25	CHI; 9	NHA; 17	DOV; 10	KAN; 14	CLT; 11	TAL; 10	MAR; 3	TEX; 10	PHO; 20	HOM; 5	7th	2336	
2014	Michael Waltrip Racing	15	Toyota	DAY; 42	PHO; 13	LVS; 23	BRI; 15	CAL; 16	MAR; 9	TEX; 8	DAR; 12	RCH; 43	TAL; 3	KAN; 23	CLT; 17	DOV; 4	POC; 11	MCH; 10	SON; 10	KEN; 23	DAY; 9	NHA; 6	IND; 16	POC; 4	GLN; 27	MCH; 6	BRI; 17	ATL; 38	RCH; 3	CHI; 39	NHA; 14	DOV; 9	KAN; 19	CLT; 43	TAL; 3	MAR; 7	TEX; 28	PHO; 40	HOM; 8	19th	979	
2015	Michael Waltrip Racing	15	Toyota	DAY; 7	ATL; 24	LVS; 21	PHO; 24	CAL; 30	MAR; 13	TEX; 22	BRI; 12	RCH; 9	TAL; 30	KAN; 21	CLT; 20	DOV; 9	POC; 22	MCH; 10	SON; 3	DAY; 10	KEN; 19	NHA; 34	IND; 6	POC; 8	GLN; 6	MCH; 41	BRI; 5	DAR; 17	RCH; 10	CHI; 19	NHA; 26	DOV; 14	CLT; 11	KAN; 40	TAL; 8	MAR; 43	TEX; 15	PHO; 23	HOM; 43	16th	2175	
2016	HScott Motorsports	15	Chevy	DAY; 33	ATL; 35	LVS; 22	PHO; 31	CAL; 18	MAR; 25	TEX; 38	BRI; 8	RCH; 33	TAL; 7	KAN; 19	DOV; 12	CLT; 23	POC; 18	MCH; 23	SON; 40	DAY; 9	KEN; 23	NHA; 24	IND; 21	POC; 26	GLN; 18	BRI; 31	MCH; 40	DAR; 22	RCH; 22	CHI; 22	NHA; 22	DOV; 24	CLT; 17	KAN; 26	TAL; 18	MAR; 28	TEX; 25	PHO; 24	HOM; 23	27th	628	
2017	Stewart–Haas Racing	14	Ford	DAY; 32	ATL; 11	LVS; 10	PHO; 13	CAL; 3	MAR; 7	TEX; 11	BRI; 2	RCH; 15	TAL; 14	KAN; 9	CLT; 14	DOV; 31	POC; 17	MCH; 26	SON; 2	DAY; 2	KEN; 13	NHA; 7	IND; 30	POC; 6	GLN; 5	MCH; 23	BRI; 19	DAR; 40	RCH; 24	CHI; 13	NHA; 7	DOV; 6	CLT; 27	TAL; 35	KAN; 19	MAR; 3	TEX; 36	PHO; 13	HOM; 12	18th	871	
2018	Stewart–Haas Racing	14	Ford	DAY; 15	ATL; 3	LVS; 18	PHO; 6	CAL; 11	MAR; 1*	TEX; 9	BRI; 8	RCH; 9	TAL; 31	DOV; 2	KAN; 15	CLT; 12	POC; 20	MCH; 1	SON; 3	CHI; 5	DAY; 22	KEN; 12	NHA; 35	POC; 11	GLN; 11	MCH; 12	BRI; 6	DAR; 36	IND; 5*	LVS; 23	RCH; 10	ROV; 3	DOV; 35	TAL; 2	KAN; 13	MAR; 21	TEX; 26	PHO; 35	HOM; 8	12th	2272	
2019	Stewart–Haas Racing	14	Ford	DAY; 20	ATL; 5	LVS; 14	PHO; 11	CAL; 38	MAR; 7	TEX; 2	BRI; 7	RCH; 3	TAL; 29	DOV; 9	KAN; 5	CLT; 24	POC; 5	MCH; 35	SON; 11	CHI; 37	DAY; 34	KEN; 6	NHA; 20	POC; 11	GLN; 20	MCH; 37	BRI; 7	DAR; 6	IND; 5	**LVS**; 25	RCH; 8	ROV; 4	DOV; 10	TAL; 23	KAN; 8	MAR; 35	TEX; 11	PHO; 8	HOM; 6	9th	2290	
2020	Stewart–Haas Racing	14	Ford	DAY; 6	LVS; 12	**CAL**; 23	PHO; 5	DAR; 17	DAR; 22*	CLT; 39	CLT; 16	BRI; 2	ATL; 20	MAR; 17	HOM; 11	TAL; 25	POC; 7	POC; 8	IND; 16	KEN; 14	TEX; 11	KAN; 14	NHA; 18	MCH; 19	MCH; 14	DRC; 6	DOV; 6	DOV; 16	DAY; 19	DAR; 10	RCH; 10	BRI; 6	LVS; 12	TAL; 33	ROV; 10	KAN; 26	TEX; 17	MAR; 8	PHO; 14	12th	2254	

===== Daytona 500 =====
Year	Team	Manufacturer	Start	Finish
2006	Richard Childress Racing	Chevrolet	37	6
2007	Richard Childress Racing	Chevrolet	11	18
2008	Richard Childress Racing	Chevrolet	31	24
2009	Richard Childress Racing	Chevrolet	22	4
2010	Richard Childress Racing	Chevrolet	9	4
2011	Richard Childress Racing	Chevrolet	6	17
2012	Michael Waltrip Racing	Toyota	30	11
2013	Michael Waltrip Racing	Toyota	10	11
2014	Michael Waltrip Racing	Toyota	20	42
2015	Michael Waltrip Racing	Toyota	9	7
2016	HScott Motorsports	Chevrolet	31	33
2017	Stewart–Haas Racing	Ford	6	32
2018	Stewart–Haas Racing	Ford	10	15
2019	Stewart–Haas Racing	Ford	6	20
2020	Stewart–Haas Racing	Ford	29	6

==== Xfinity Series ====
NASCAR Xfinity Series results
Year	Team	No.	Make	1	2	3	4	5	6	7	8	9	10	11	12	13	14	15	16	17	18	19	20	21	22	23	24	25	26	27	28	29	30	31	32	33	34	35	NXSC	Pts	Ref
2004	Richard Childress Racing	21	Chevy	DAY	CAR	LVS	DAR	BRI	TEX; 36	NSH; 4	**TAL**; 22	CAL	GTW; 12	RCH	NZH; 18	CLT	DOV	NSH; 3	KEN; 10	MLW; 10	DAY			PPR; 4	IRP; 17	MCH	BRI	CAL	RCH	DOV	KAN; 32		MEM; 4	ATL; 20	PHO		HOM; 39		29th	1933	
2004	Andy Petree Racing	33	Chevy																			CHI; 42	NHA																29th	1933	
2004	Kevin Harvick Incorporated	33	Chevy																													CLT; 10				DAR; 15			29th	1933	
2005	Richard Childress Racing	2	Chevy	DAY; 12	CAL; 4	MXC; 7	LVS; 9	ATL; 21	NSH; 5	BRI; 13	TEX; 6	PHO; 13	TAL; 19	DAR; 10	RCH; 9	CLT; 32	DOV; 19	NSH; 1	KEN; 3	MLW; 10	DAY; 5	CHI; 6	NHA; 16	**PPR**; 2	GTW; 8	IRP; 2	GLN; 15	MCH; 30	BRI; 4	**CAL**; 3	RCH; 11	DOV; 2	KAN; 16	CLT; 33	MEM; 1*	TEX; 7	PHO; 2	HOM; 8	2nd	4869	
2006	Richard Childress Racing	2	Chevy	DAY; 3	CAL; 16	MXC; 16	LVS; 9	ATL; 14	BRI; 12	TEX; 18	NSH; 2	PHO; 21	TAL; 5	RCH; 7	DAR; 17	CLT; 36	DOV; 4	NSH; 2	KEN; 12	MLW; 18	DAY; 6	CHI; 7	NHA; 5	**MAR**; 2	GTW; 2	IRP; 40	GLN; 17	MCH; 12	BRI; 23	**CAL**; 13	RCH; 37	**DOV**; 1	KAN; 5	CLT; 7	MEM; 2	TEX; 17	PHO; 4	HOM; 11	3rd	4683	
2007	Richard Childress Racing	2	Chevy	DAY; 4	CAL	MXC	LVS; 41	ATL; 6	BRI; 5	NSH	TEX	PHO; 1*	TAL; 13	RCH; 1	DAR; 5	CLT; 3	DOV	NSH; 2	KEN	MLW	NHA; 6	DAY; 5	CHI; 4	GTW	IRP	CGV	GLN	MCH; 10	BRI; 8		RCH; 33	DOV	KAN; 4	CLT; 8	MEM	TEX; 4	**PHO**; 3	HOM; 9	12th	3269	
2007	Richard Childress Racing	21	Chevy																											CAL; 5									12th	3269	
2008	Richard Childress Racing	2	Chevy	DAY; 25	CAL; 9	LVS; 3	ATL; 19	BRI; 1*	NSH; 2	TEX; 3	PHO; 8	MXC; 6	TAL; 25	RCH; 9	DAR; 2	CLT; 6	DOV; 9	NSH; 4	KEN; 9	MLW; 3	NHA; 9	DAY; 4	CHI; 7	GTW; 8	IRP; 18	CGV; 9	GLN; 23	MCH; 10	BRI; 2	CAL; 7	RCH; 3	DOV; 10	KAN; 2	CLT; 4	MEM; 16	TEX; 6	PHO; 4	HOM; 5	1st	5132	
2009	Richard Childress Racing	29	Chevy	DAY; 3	CAL	LVS	BRI; 3	TEX	NSH	PHO	TAL; 31	RCH	DAR	CLT	DOV; 3	NSH	KEN	MLW	NHA; 14	**DAY**; 1	CHI	GTW	IRP	IOW	GLN	MCH	BRI; 7	CGV	ATL	RCH; 11	DOV; 1	KAN; 9	CAL; 26	CLT	MEM	TEX	PHO; 4	HOM	29th	1750	
2010	Richard Childress Racing	21	Chevy	DAY	CAL	LVS	BRI	NSH	PHO; 11	TEX; 35	TAL; 6	RCH; 23	DAR; 39	DOV; 25	**CLT**; 10	NSH	KEN	ROA	NHA	DAY; 6	CHI	GTW	IRP	IOW	GLN	MCH	BRI; 7	CGV	ATL; 14	RCH; 7	DOV	KAN	CAL	**CLT**; 5	GTW	TEX; 30	PHO	HOM	32nd	1506	
2011	Kevin Harvick Incorporated	33	Chevy	**DAY**; 2	PHO	LVS	BRI	CAL	TEX	TAL; 22	NSH	RCH	DAR; 6	DOV; 14	IOW	CLT	CHI	MCH	ROA	DAY; 34	KEN	NHA	NSH	IRP	IOW	GLN	CGV	BRI; 3	ATL	RCH	CHI	DOV; 3	KAN	CLT	TEX; 4	PHO; 7	HOM; 4		100th	0^{1}	
2012	Joe Gibbs Racing	20	Toyota	DAY	PHO	LVS	BRI	CAL	TEX	RCH	TAL	DAR	IOW	CLT	DOV	MCH	ROA	KEN	DAY; 26	NHA	CHI	IND	IOW	GLN	CGV	BRI	ATL	RCH	CHI	KEN	DOV	CLT	KAN	TEX	PHO	HOM			137th	0^{1}	
2014	Joe Gibbs Racing	11	Toyota	DAY	PHO	LVS	BRI	CAL	TEX	DAR	RCH	TAL	IOW	CLT	DOV	MCH	ROA	KEN	DAY	NHA	CHI	IND	IOW	GLN	MOH	BRI	ATL	RCH	CHI	KEN	DOV	KAN	CLT	TEX; QL^{†}	PHO	HOM			N/A	–	
2016	JR Motorsports	88	Chevy	DAY	ATL	LVS	PHO	CAL	TEX	BRI	RCH	TAL	DOV	CLT	POC	MCH	IOW	DAY	KEN	NHA	IND	IOW	GLN	MOH	BRI	ROA	DAR	RCH	CHI; 6	KEN	DOV	CLT	KAN	TEX	PHO	HOM			104th	0^{1}	
^{†} – Qualified for Elliott Sadler

==== Craftsman Truck Series ====
NASCAR Craftsman Truck Series results
Year	Team	No.	Make	1	2	3	4	5	6	7	8	9	10	11	12	13	14	15	16	17	18	19	20	21	22	23	24	25	NCTC	Pts	Ref
2006	SS-Green Light Racing	07	Chevy	DAY	CAL	ATL	MAR; 7	GTW	CLT	MFD	DOV	TEX	MCH	MLW	KAN	KEN	MEM	IRP	NSH	BRI									42nd	434	
2006	Morgan-Dollar Motorsports	46	Chevy																		NHA; 25	LVS	TAL	MAR	ATL	**TEX**; 1^{*}	PHO	HOM	42nd	434	
2007	Kevin Harvick, Inc.	2	Chevy	DAY	CAL	ATL; 5	MAR	KAN	CLT	MFD	DOV; 34	TEX	MCH	MLW	MEM	KEN	IRP	NSH	BRI	GTW	NHA; 35	LVS	TAL	MAR; 17	ATL	TEX	PHO	HOM	53rd	391	
2010	Kevin Harvick, Inc.	2	Chevy	DAY	ATL	MAR	NSH	KAN	DOV	CLT	TEX	MCH	IOW	GTW	IRP	POC	NSH	DAR	BRI	CHI	KEN	NHA	LVS	MAR	TAL	TEX	PHO; 1^{*}	HOM	75th	195	
2011	Kevin Harvick, Inc.	2	Chevy	DAY	**PHO**; 2	DAR	MAR	NSH	DOV	CLT; 2^{*}	KAN; 1^{*}	TEX	KEN	IOW	NSH	IRP	POC	MCH	BRI	ATL; 2^{*}	CHI	NHA	KEN	LVS	TAL	MAR	TEX	HOM	82nd	0^{1}	
2014	Athenian Motorsports	05	Toyota	DAY	MAR	KAN	CLT	DOV	TEX	GTW	KEN	IOW	ELD	POC; 4	MCH	BRI	MSP	CHI	NHA	LVS	TAL	MAR	TEX	PHO	HOM				94th	0^{1}	
2016	GMS Racing	24	Chevy	DAY	ATL	MAR	KAN; 5	DOV	CLT	TEX	IOW	GTW	KEN	ELD	POC	BRI	MCH	MSP	CHI	NHA	LVS	TAL	MAR	TEX	PHO	HOM			84th	0^{1}	
2024	Spire Motorsports	7	Chevy	DAY	ATL	LVS	BRI	COA	MAR	TEX	KAN	DAR	NWS	CLT	GTW	NSH; 17	POC	IRP	RCH	MLW	BRI	KAN	TAL	HOM	MAR	PHO			53rd	22	
2026	Kaulig Racing	25	Ram	DAY	ATL	STP	DAR	CAR	BRI	TEX	GLN	DOV; 29	CLT	NSH	MCH	COR	LRP	NWS	IRP	RCH	NHA	BRI	KAN	CLT	PHO	TAL	MAR	HOM	82nd	8	

^{*} Season still in progress
^{1} Ineligible for series points

=== ARCA Re/Max Series ===
(key) (Bold – Pole position awarded by qualifying time. Italics – Pole position earned by points standings or practice time. * – Most laps led.)

ARCA Re/Max Series results
Year	Team	No.	Make	1	2	3	4	5	6	7	8	9	10	11	12	13	14	15	16	17	18	19	20	21	22	ARSC	Pts	Ref
2003	Scott Traylor Motorsports	5	Pontiac	DAY	ATL	NSH	SLM	TOL	KEN	CLT	BLN	KAN	MCH	LER	POC	POC	NSH; 2	ISF	WIN	DSF	CHI	SLM	TAL	CLT; 20	SBO	74th	350	
2004	Scott Traylor Motorsports	7	Chevy	DAY; 8	NSH	SLM	KEN	TOL	CLT	KAN	POC	MCH	SBO	BLN	KEN	GTW	POC	LER	NSH	ISF	TOL	DSF	CHI	SLM	TAL	114th	195	

==== West Series ====
NASCAR West Series results
Year	Team	No.	Make	1	2	3	4	5	6	7	8	9	10	11	12	13	NWSC	Pts	Ref
2004	Bill McAnally Racing	20	Chevy	PHO; 8	MMR	**CAL**; 2*	S99	EVG	IRW	S99	RMR	DCS	PHO	CNS	MMR	IRW	32nd	322	

=== 24 Hours of Daytona ===
(key)

24 Hours of Daytona results
Year	Class	No	Team	Car	Co-drivers	Laps	Position	Class Pos.
2013	GT	56	(Italy) AF Waltrip	Ferrari 458	(Portugal) Rui Águas (United States) Rob Kauffman (United States) Michael Waltrip	677	16	8

=== Superstar Racing Experience ===
(key) * – Most laps led. ^{1} – Heat 1 winner. ^{2} – Heat 2 winner.

Superstar Racing Experience results
Year	No.	1	2	3	4	5	6	SRXC	Pts
2023	07	STA; 3	STA II	MMS; 2^{2}	BER	ELD	LOS; 5	11th	0^{1}

Sporting positions
Preceded by Carl Edwards	NASCAR Nationwide Series Champion; 2008	Succeeded by Kyle Busch
Achievements
Preceded by Jimmie Johnson	Prelude to the Dream Winner; 2011	Succeeded by Kyle Busch
