= 2005 Golden Corral 500 =

Race details
- Race 4 of 36 in the 2005 NASCAR Nextel Cup Series
- 2005 Golden Corral 500 program cover
- Date: March 20, 2005
- Official name: Golden Corral 500
- Location: Atlanta Motor Speedway, Hampton, Georgia
- Course: Permanent racing facility
- Course length: 1.54 miles (2.478 km)
- Distance: 325 laps, 500.5 mi (805.477 km)
- Average speed: 143.478 miles per hour (230.905 km/h)

Pole position
Driver	Ryan Newman	Penske Racing
- Time: 28.476

Most laps led
Driver	Jimmie Johnson	Hendrick Motorsports
- Laps: 156

Winner
No. 99	Carl Edwards	Roush Racing

Television in the United States
- Network: Fox Broadcasting Company
- Announcers: Mike Joy, Darrell Waltrip and Larry McReynolds

The 2005 Golden Corral 500 was a NASCAR Nextel Cup Series race held on March 20, 2005, at Atlanta Motor Speedway, in Hampton, Georgia. Contested over 325 laps on the 1.54-mile (2.48-kilometre) speedway, it was the 4th race of the 2005 NASCAR Nextel Cup Series season. Carl Edwards of Roush Racing won the race, the first of his career.

== Background ==
Atlanta Motor Speedway (formerly Atlanta International Raceway) is a track in Hampton, Georgia, 20 miles (32 kilometres) south of Atlanta. It is a 1.54-mile (2.48-kilometre) quad-oval track with a seating capacity of 111,000. It opened in 1960 as a 1.5-mile (2.4-kilometre) standard oval. In 1994, 46 condominiums were built over the northeastern side of the track. In 1997, to standardize the track with Speedway Motorsports' other two 1.5-mile (2.4-kilometre) ovals, the entire track was almost completely rebuilt. The frontstretch and backstretch were swapped, and the configuration of the track was changed from oval to quad-oval. The project made the track one of the fastest on the NASCAR circuit.

== Entry list ==
Car #	Driver	Hometown	Make	Sponsor	Team	Crew Chief
0	Mike Bliss	Milwaukie, OR	Chevrolet	NetZero Best Buy	Gene Haas	
00	Carl Long	Roxboro, NC	Chevrolet	Buyer's Choice Auto Warranties	Raynard McGlynn	
01	Joe Nemechek	Lakeland, FL	Chevrolet	CENTRIX Financial	Nelson Bowers	
2	Rusty Wallace	St. Louis, MO	Dodge	Miller Lite	Roger Penske	
4	Mike Wallace	St. Louis, MO	Chevrolet	Lucas Oil Products	Larry McClure	
5	Kyle Busch	Las Vegas, NV	Chevrolet	Kellogg's	Rick Hendrick	
6	Mark Martin	Batesville, AR	Ford	Viagra	Jack Roush	
07	Dave Blaney	Hartford, OH	Chevrolet	Snap-On Tools / Jack Daniel's	Richard Childress	
7	Robby Gordon	Bellflower, CA	Chevrolet	Harrah's	James Smith	
8	Dale Earnhardt Jr.	Kannapolis, NC	Chevrolet	Budweiser	Teresa Earnhardt	
08	Shane Hmiel	Pleasant Garden, NC	Chevrolet	Win Fuel	Todd Braun	
9	Kasey Kahne	Enumclaw, WA	Dodge	Dodge Dealers / UAW	Ray Evernham	
10	Scott Riggs	Bahama, NC	Chevrolet	Valvoline	James Rocco	
11	Jason Leffler	Long Beach, CA	Chevrolet	FedEx Express	J D Gibbs	
12	Ryan Newman	South Bend, IN	Dodge	Alltel	Roger Penske	
14	John Andretti	Bethlehem, PA	Ford	VB / APlus at Sunoco	Gregory Pollex	
15	Michael Waltrip	Owensboro, KY	Chevrolet	NAPA Auto Parts	Teresa Earnhardt	
16	Greg Biffle	Vancouver, WA	Ford	3M Post-it / National Guard	Geoff Smith	
17	Matt Kenseth	Cambridge, WI	Ford	Trex Decking & Railing	Mark Martin	
18	Bobby Labonte	Corpus Christi, TX	Chevrolet	Interstate Batteries	Joe Gibbs	
19	Jeremy Mayfield	Owensboro, KY	Dodge	Dodge Dealers / UAW	Ray Evernham	
20	Tony Stewart	Rushville, IN	Chevrolet	The Home Depot	Joe Gibbs	
21	Ricky Rudd	Chesapeake, VA	Ford	Motorcraft Genuine Parts	Glen Wood	
22	Scott Wimmer	Wausau, WI	Dodge	Caterpillar	Bill Davis	
24	Jeff Gordon	Vallejo, CA	Chevrolet	DuPont	Rick Hendrick	
25	Brian Vickers	Thomasville, NC	Chevrolet	GMAC / ditech.com	Mary Hendrick	
27	Kirk Shelmerdine	Winston-Salem, NC	Ford	Freddie B's	Kirk Shelmerdine	
29	Kevin Harvick	Bakersfield, CA	Chevrolet	GM Goodwrench	Richard Childress	
31	Jeff Burton	South Boston, VA	Chevrolet	Cingular Wireless	Richard Childress	
32	Bobby Hamilton Jr.	Nashville, TN	Chevrolet	Tide	Calvin Wells III	
34	Randy LaJoie	Norwalk, CT	Chevrolet	Mach One Inc.	William Edwards	
37	Kevin Lepage	Shelburne, VT	Dodge	Newell Recycling / R&J Racing	John Carter	
38	Elliott Sadler	Emporia, VA	Ford	Combos	Robert Yates	
40	Sterling Marlin	Columbia, TN	Dodge	Coors Light	Felix Sabates	
41	Casey Mears	Bakersfield, CA	Dodge	Nicorette Fresh Mint Gum	Chip Ganassi	
42	Jamie McMurray	Joplin, MO	Dodge	Texaco / Havoline	Floyd Ganassi	
43	Jeff Green	Owensboro, KY	Dodge	Cheerios Spoonfuls of Stories	Richard L Petty	
45	Kyle Petty	Trinity, NC	Dodge	Georgia-Pacific / Brawny	Kyle Petty	
48	Jimmie Johnson	El Cajon, CA	Chevrolet	Lowe's	Jeff Gordon	
49	Ken Schrader	Fenton, MO	Dodge	Red Baron Frozen Pizza	Elizabeth Morgenthau	
50	Jimmy Spencer	Berwick, PA	Dodge	U.S. Micro Corporation	Don Arnold	
66	Hermie Sadler	Emporia, VA	Ford	Peak Fitness	Jeff Stec	
75	Mike Garvey	McDonough, GA	Dodge	Jani-King / KGB Swim Wear	Robert Rinaldi	
77	Travis Kvapil	Janesville, WI	Dodge	Kodak / Jasper Engines	Douglas Bawel	
88	Dale Jarrett	Hickory, NC	Ford	UPS	Robert Yates	
89	Morgan Shepherd	Conover, NC	Dodge	Victory in Jesus / Red Line Oil	Cindy Shepherd	
91	Bill Elliott	Dawsonville, GA	Dodge	Visteon	Ray Evernham Sr.	
92	Stanton Barrett	Bishop, CA	Chevrolet	USmilitary.com	Bob Jenkins	
97	Kurt Busch	Las Vegas, NV	Ford	Sharpie / IRWIN Industrial Tools	Georgetta Roush	
99	Carl Edwards	Columbia, MO	Ford	Scotts	Jack Roush	

== Qualifying ==
Pos	Car #	Driver	Make	Primary Sponsor	Speed	Time	Behind
1	12	Ryan Newman	Dodge	Alltel	194.690	28.476	0.000
2	32	Bobby Hamilton Jr.	Chevrolet	Tide	193.785	28.609	-0.133
3	48	Jimmie Johnson	Chevrolet	Lowe's	193.184	28.698	-0.222
4	99	Carl Edwards	Ford	Scotts	192.976	28.729	-0.253
5	9	Kasey Kahne	Dodge	Dodge Dealers / UAW	191.894	28.891	-0.415
6	16	Greg Biffle	Ford	3M Post-it / National Guard	191.252	28.988	-0.512
7	1	Joe Nemechek	Chevrolet	CENTRIX Financial	191.192	28.997	-0.521
8	25	Brian Vickers	Chevrolet	GMAC / ditech.com	191.126	29.007	-0.531
9	20	Tony Stewart	Chevrolet	The Home Depot	191.067	29.016	-0.540
10	11	Jason Leffler	Chevrolet	FedEx Express	190.935	29.036	-0.560
11	38	Elliott Sadler	Ford	Combos	190.883	29.044	-0.568
12	6	Mark Martin	Ford	Viagra	190.791	29.058	-0.582
13	42	Jamie McMurray	Dodge	Texaco / Havoline	190.699	29.072	-0.596
14	19	Jeremy Mayfield	Dodge	Dodge Dealers / UAW	190.614	29.085	-0.609
15	41	Casey Mears	Dodge	Nicorette Fresh Mint Gum	190.450	29.110	-0.634
16	0	Mike Bliss	Chevrolet	NetZero Best Buy	190.150	29.156	-0.680
17	10	Scott Riggs	Chevrolet	Valvoline	190.137	29.158	-0.682
18	91	Bill Elliott	Dodge	Visteon	190.006	29.178	-0.702
19	18	Bobby Labonte	Chevrolet	Interstate Batteries	189.935	29.189	-0.713
20	77	Travis Kvapil	Dodge	Kodak / Jasper Engines	189.740	29.219	-0.743
21	08	Shane Hmiel	Chevrolet	Win Fuel	189.740	29.219	-0.743
22	50	Jimmy Spencer	Dodge	U.S. Micro Corporation	189.662	29.231	-0.755
23	17	Matt Kenseth	Ford	Trex Decking & Railing	189.512	29.254	-0.778
24	97	Kurt Busch	Ford	Sharpie / IRWIN Industrial Tools	189.389	29.273	-0.797
25	24	Jeff Gordon	Chevrolet	DuPont	189.234	29.297	-0.821
26	7	Robby Gordon	Chevrolet	Harrah's	189.221	29.299	-0.823
27	07	Dave Blaney	Chevrolet	Snap-On Tools / Jack Daniel's	188.796	29.365	-0.889
28	49	Ken Schrader	Dodge	Red Baron Frozen Pizza	188.764	29.370	-0.894
29	37	Kevin Lepage	Dodge	Newell Recycling / R&J Racing	188.700	29.380	-0.904
30	4	Mike Wallace	Chevrolet	Lucas Oil Products	188.501	29.411	-0.935
31	21	Ricky Rudd	Ford	Motorcraft Genuine Parts	188.424	29.423	-0.947
32	2	Rusty Wallace	Dodge	Miller Lite	188.092	29.475	-0.999
33	22	Scott Wimmer	Dodge	Caterpillar	188.053	29.481	-1.005
34	88	Dale Jarrett	Ford	UPS	187.329	29.595	-1.119
35	8	Dale Earnhardt Jr.	Chevrolet	Budweiser	187.272	29.604	-1.128
36	29	Kevin Harvick	Chevrolet	GM Goodwrench	186.944	29.656	-1.180
37	15	Michael Waltrip	Chevrolet	NAPA Auto Parts	186.855	29.670	-1.194
38	31	Jeff Burton	Chevrolet	Cingular Wireless	186.742	29.688	-1.212
39	40	Sterling Marlin	Dodge	Coors Light	186.128	29.786	-1.310
40	43	Jeff Green	Dodge	Cheerios Spoonfuls of Stories	185.257	29.926	-1.450
41	45	Kyle Petty	Dodge	Georgia-Pacific / Brawny	185.053	29.959	-1.483
42	5	Kyle Busch	Chevrolet	Kellogg's	0.000	0.000	0.000
43	75	Mike Garvey	Dodge	Jani-King / KGB Swim Wear	187.843	29.514	-1.038
Failed to qualify
44	34	Randy LaJoie	Chevrolet	Mach One Inc.		29.758	
45	14	John Andretti	Ford	VB/A Plus at Sunoco		29.524	
46	92	Stanton Barrett	Chevrolet	USmilitary.com		29.821	
47	00	Carl Long	Chevrolet	Buyer's Choice / Howes Lubricator		30.014	
48	27	Kirk Shelmerdine	Ford	Freddie B's		30.125	
49	66	Hermie Sadler	Ford	Peak Fitness		30.154	
50	89	Morgan Shepherd	Dodge	Victory In Jesus / Red Line Oil		30.222	

== Results ==
Fin	St	#	Driver	Sponsor	Make	Laps	Led	Status	Pts	Winnings
1	4	99	Carl Edwards	Scotts	Ford	325	9	running	185	165450
2	3	48	Jimmie Johnson	Lowe's	Chevy	325	156	running	180	173241
3	6	16	Greg Biffle	Post-it Notes, National Guard	Ford	325	151	running	170	121800
4	12	6	Mark Martin	Viagra	Ford	325	2	running	165	105150
5	5	9	Kasey Kahne	Dodge Dealers, UAW	Dodge	325	0	running	155	115875
6	8	25	Brian Vickers	GMAC, ditech.com	Chevy	325	0	running	150	85325
7	37	15	Michael Waltrip	NAPA Auto Parts	Chevy	325	0	running	146	109689
8	27	07	Dave Blaney	Snap-On Tools, Jack Daniel's	Chevy	325	1	running	147	83625
9	17	10	Scott Riggs	Valvoline	Chevy	325	0	running	138	100983
10	11	38	Elliott Sadler	Combos	Ford	325	0	running	134	123066
11	13	42	Jamie McMurray	Texaco, Havoline	Dodge	325	0	running	130	82500
12	42	5	Kyle Busch	Kellogg's	Chevy	325	0	running	127	87175
13	14	19	Jeremy Mayfield	Dodge Dealers, UAW	Dodge	325	0	running	124	99470
14	1	12	Ryan Newman	Alltel	Dodge	325	5	running	126	120266
15	38	31	Jeff Burton	Cingular Wireless	Chevy	325	0	running	118	99120
16	39	40	Sterling Marlin	Coors Light	Dodge	325	0	running	115	99633
17	9	20	Tony Stewart	Home Depot	Chevy	325	0	running	112	115861
18	16	0	Mike Bliss	NetZero, Best Buy	Chevy	324	0	running	109	70815
19	15	41	Casey Mears	Nicorette Fresh Mint Gum	Dodge	324	0	running	106	94648
20	33	22	Scott Wimmer	Caterpillar	Dodge	324	0	running	103	94348
21	36	29	Kevin Harvick	GM Goodwrench 20 Years	Chevy	324	0	running	100	106826
22	18	91	Bill Elliott	Visteon	Dodge	324	0	running	97	66510
23	34	88	Dale Jarrett	UPS	Ford	323	1	running	99	104618
24	35	8	Dale Earnhardt, Jr.	Budweiser	Chevy	323	0	running	91	113518
25	10	11	Jason Leffler	FedEx Express	Chevy	323	0	running	88	66285
26	28	49	Ken Schrader	Red Baron Frozen Pizza	Dodge	323	0	running	85	68735
27	32	2	Rusty Wallace	Miller Lite	Dodge	322	0	running	82	99553
28	40	43	Jeff Green	Cheerios Spoonfuls of Stories	Dodge	321	0	running	79	96806
29	22	50	Jimmy Spencer	US Micro Corporation	Dodge	314	0	running	76	65160
30	29	37	Kevin Lepage	Carter's Royal Dispos-All	Dodge	314	0	running	73	65535
31	23	17	Matt Kenseth	Trex Decking & Railing	Ford	311	0	running	70	112896
32	24	97	Kurt Busch	Sharpie, Irwin Industrial Tools	Ford	304	0	running	67	117310
33	31	21	Ricky Rudd	Motorcraft	Ford	300	0	running	64	92984
34	26	7	Robby Gordon	Harrah's	Chevy	290	0	engine	61	64775
35	7	01	Joe Nemechek	Centrix Financial	Chevy	280	0	engine	58	84398
36	41	45	Kyle Petty	Georgia-Pacific, Brawny	Dodge	271	0	engine	55	74252
37	19	18	Bobby Labonte	Interstate Batteries	Chevy	266	0	crash	52	99245
38	2	32	Bobby Hamilton, Jr.	Tide	Chevy	245	0	running	49	65385
39	25	24	Jeff Gordon	DuPont	Chevy	214	0	crash	46	113326
40	30	4	Mike Wallace	Lucas Oil	Chevy	113	0	engine	43	64540
41	43	75	Mike Garvey	Jani-King, KGB Swim Wear	Dodge	15	0	vibration	40	64500
42	20	77	Travis Kvapil	Kodak, Jasper Engines & Transmissions	Dodge	0	0	crash	37	72460
43	21	08	Shane Hmiel	Win Fuel	Chevy	0	0	crash	34	63883
Failed to qualify, withdrew, or driver changes:
44		34	Randy LaJoie	Mach One Inc.	Chevrolet					
45		14	John Andretti	VB/A Plus at Sunoco	Ford					
46		92	Stanton Barrett	USmilitary.com	Chevrolet					
47		00	Carl Long	Buyer's Choice / Howes Lubricator	Chevrolet					
48		27	Kirk Shelmerdine	Freddie B's	Ford					
49		66	Hermie Sadler	Peak Fitness	Ford					
50		89	Morgan Shepherd	Victory In Jesus / Red Line Oil	Dodge					

== Race statistics ==
- Time of race: 3:29:18
- Average speed: 143.478 miles per hour (230.905 km/h)
- Pole speed: 194.690 miles per hour (313.323 km/h)
- Cautions: 8 for 40 laps
- Margin of victory: 0.028 seconds
- Lead changes: 27
- Percent of race run under caution: 12.3%
- Average green flag run: 31.7 laps

Preceded by 2005 UAW-DaimlerChrysler 400	NASCAR Nextel Cup Series Season; 2005	Succeeded by 2005 Food City 500
