= 2005 Food City 500 =

Race details
- Race 5 of 36 in the 2005 NASCAR Nextel Cup Series
- The 2005 Food City 500 program cover.
- Date: April 3, 2005
- Location: Bristol Motor Speedway
- Course: Permanent racing facility
- Course length: 0.533 miles (0.858 km)
- Distance: 500 laps, 266.5 mi (428.89 km)
- Average speed: 77.496 mph (124.718 km/h)
- Attendance: 160,000

Pole position
Driver	Elliott Sadler	Robert Yates Racing
- Time: 15.022

Most laps led
Driver	Rusty Wallace	Penske Racing
- Laps: 157

Winner
No. 29	Kevin Harvick	Richard Childress Racing

Television in the United States
- Network: FOX
- Announcers: Mike Joy, Larry McReynolds, Darrell Waltrip

Radio in the United States
- Radio: Performance Racing Network

The 2005 Food City 500 was the 5th race of the 2005 NASCAR Nextel Cup Series season, held on April 3, 2005, at Bristol Motor Speedway in Bristol, Tennessee. Pole position was won by Elliott Sadler of Robert Yates Racing, who had a pole time of 15.022 seconds. Rusty Wallace would lead the most laps of the day with 157. In the end, Kevin Harvick would win the race.

== Entry list ==
No.	Driver	Team	Make
00	Carl Long	McGlynn Racing	Chevrolet
0	Mike Bliss	Haas CNC Racing	Chevrolet
01	Joe Nemechek	MBV Motorsports	Chevrolet
2	Rusty Wallace	Penske-Jasper Racing	Dodge
4	Mike Wallace	Morgan–McClure Motorsports	Chevrolet
5	Kyle Busch	Hendrick Motorsports	Chevrolet
6	Mark Martin	Roush Racing	Ford
7	Robby Gordon	Robby Gordon Motorsports	Chevrolet
07	Dave Blaney	Richard Childress Racing	Chevrolet
8	Dale Earnhardt Jr.	Dale Earnhardt, Inc.	Chevrolet
08	Shane Hmiel	Braun Racing	Chevrolet
9	Kasey Kahne	Evernham Motorsports	Dodge
09	Johnny Sauter	Phoenix Racing	Dodge
10	Scott Riggs	MBV Motorsports	Chevrolet
11	Jason Leffler	Joe Gibbs Racing	Chevrolet
12	Ryan Newman	Penske-Jasper Racing	Dodge
15	Michael Waltrip	Dale Earnhardt, Inc.	Chevrolet
16	Greg Biffle	Roush Racing	Ford
17	Matt Kenseth	Roush Racing	Ford
18	Bobby Labonte	Joe Gibbs Racing	Chevrolet
19	Jeremy Mayfield	Evernham Motorsports	Dodge
20	Tony Stewart	Joe Gibbs Racing	Chevrolet
21	Ricky Rudd	Wood Brothers Racing	Ford
22	Scott Wimmer	Bill Davis Racing	Dodge
24	Jeff Gordon	Hendrick Motorsports	Chevrolet
25	Brian Vickers	Hendrick Motorsports	Chevrolet
27	Brad Teague	Kirk Shelmerdine Racing	Ford
29	Kevin Harvick	Richard Childress Racing	Chevrolet
31	Jeff Burton	Richard Childress Racing	Chevrolet
32	Bobby Hamilton Jr.	PPI Motorsports	Chevrolet
34	Randy LaJoie	Mach 1 Motorsports	Chevrolet
37	Kevin Lepage	R&J Racing	Dodge
38	Elliott Sadler	Robert Yates Racing	Ford
40	Sterling Marlin	Chip Ganassi Racing	Dodge
41	Casey Mears	Chip Ganassi Racing	Dodge
42	Jamie McMurray	Chip Ganassi Racing	Dodge
43	Jeff Green	Petty Enterprises	Dodge
44	Terry Labonte	Hendrick Motorsports	Chevrolet
45	Kyle Petty	Petty Enterprises	Dodge
48	Jimmie Johnson	Hendrick Motorsports	Chevrolet
49	Ken Schrader	BAM Racing	Dodge
50	Jimmy Spencer	Arnold Motorsports	Dodge
66	Hermie Sadler	Peak Fitness Racing	Ford
77	Travis Kvapil	Penske-Jasper Racing	Dodge
88	Dale Jarrett	Robert Yates Racing	Ford
92	Stanton Barrett	Front Row Motorsports	Chevrolet
97	Kurt Busch	Roush Racing	Ford
99	Carl Edwards	Roush Racing	Ford

== Qualifying ==
Elliott Sadler would win the pole with a 15.022. Meanwhile, Carl Edwards would crash during qualifying after spinning off of Turn 2, causing him to start at the back.

Pos	No.	Driver	Make	Speed	Time	Behind
1	38	Elliott Sadler	Ford	127.733	15.022	0.000
2	07	Dave Blaney	Chevrolet	127.444	15.056	-0.034
3	2	Rusty Wallace	Dodge	127.048	15.103	-0.081
4	24	Jeff Gordon	Chevrolet	126.964	15.113	-0.091
5	77	Travis Kvapil	Dodge	126.955	15.114	-0.092
6	43	Jeff Green	Dodge	126.603	15.156	-0.134
7	12	Ryan Newman	Dodge	126.536	15.164	-0.142
8	19	Jeremy Mayfield	Dodge	126.536	15.164	-0.142
9	9	Kasey Kahne	Dodge	126.503	15.168	-0.146
10	16	Greg Biffle	Ford	126.503	15.168	-0.146
11	20	Tony Stewart	Chevrolet	126.462	15.173	-0.151
12	25	Brian Vickers	Chevrolet	126.403	15.180	-0.158
13	29	Kevin Harvick	Chevrolet	126.312	15.191	-0.169
14	48	Jimmie Johnson	Chevrolet	126.303	15.192	-0.170
15	40	Sterling Marlin	Dodge	126.245	15.199	-0.177
16	44	Terry Labonte	Chevrolet	126.179	15.207	-0.185
17	42	Jamie McMurray	Dodge	126.104	15.216	-0.194
18	32	Bobby Hamilton Jr	Chevrolet	126.013	15.227	-0.205
19	8	Dale Earnhardt Jr	Chevrolet	125.947	15.235	-0.213
20	21	Ricky Rudd	Ford	125.947	15.235	-0.213
21	88	Dale Jarrett	Ford	125.897	15.241	-0.219
22	4	Mike Wallace	Chevrolet	125.897	15.241	-0.219
23	92	Stanton Barrett	Chevrolet	125.782	15.255	-0.233
24	31	Jeff Burton	Chevrolet	125.716	15.263	-0.241
25	17	Matt Kenseth	Ford	125.642	15.272	-0.250
26	97	Kurt Busch	Ford	125.568	15.281	-0.259
27	15	Michael Waltrip	Chevrolet	125.436	15.297	-0.275
28	10	Scott Riggs	Chevrolet	125.354	15.307	-0.285
29	50	Jimmy Spencer	Dodge	125.313	15.312	-0.290
30	49	Ken Schrader	Dodge	125.281	15.316	-0.294
31	41	Casey Mears	Dodge	125.003	15.350	-0.328
32	22	Scott Wimmer	Dodge	124.954	15.356	-0.334
33	08	Shane Hmiel	Chevrolet	124.954	15.356	-0.334
34	6	Mark Martin	Ford	124.922	15.360	-0.338
35	66	Hermie Sadler	Ford	124.889	15.364	-0.342
36	11	Jason Leffler	Chevrolet	124.646	15.394	-0.372
37	45	Kyle Petty	Dodge	124.581	15.402	-0.380
38	18	Bobby Labonte	Chevrolet	124.258	15.442	-0.420
39	5	Kyle Busch	Chevrolet	124.210	15.448	-0.426
40	1	Joe Nemechek	Chevrolet	123.770	15.503	-0.481
41	0	Mike Bliss	Chevrolet	123.079	15.590	-0.568
42	99	Carl Edwards	Ford	0.000	0.000	0.000
43	00	Carl Long	Chevrolet	124.387	15.426	-0.404
Failed to qualify or withdrew
44	09	Johnny Sauter	Dodge	124.162	15.454	
45	37	Kevin Lepage	Dodge	123.945	15.481	
46	7	Robby Gordon	Chevrolet	123.190	15.576	
47	34	Randy LaJoie	Chevrolet	121.813	15.752	
48	27	Brad Teague	Ford	120.999	15.858	
WD	89	Jason Jarrett	Dodge	0.000	0.000	0.000

== Results ==
Fin	No.	Driver	Make	Team	Laps	Led	Status	Pts	Winnings
1	29	Kevin Harvick	Chevrolet	Richard Childress Racing	500	109	running	185	$189,001
2	38	Elliott Sadler	Ford	Robert Yates Racing	500	35	running	175	$164,261
3	20	Tony Stewart	Chevrolet	Joe Gibbs Racing	500	0	running	165	$151,986
4	8	Dale Earnhardt Jr.	Chevrolet	Dale Earnhardt, Inc.	500	0	running	160	$144,033
5	88	Dale Jarrett	Ford	Robert Yates Racing	500	0	running	155	$128,828
6	48	Jimmie Johnson	Chevrolet	Hendrick Motorsports	500	1	running	155	$132,986
7	77	Travis Kvapil	Dodge	Penske-Jasper Racing	500	0	running	146	$96,595
8	45	Kyle Petty	Dodge	Petty Enterprises	500	0	running	142	$102,903
9	16	Greg Biffle	Ford	Roush Racing	500	91	running	143	$110,640
10	10	Scott Riggs	Chevrolet	MBV Motorsports	500	0	running	134	$117,448
11	40	Sterling Marlin	Dodge	Chip Ganassi Racing	499	0	running	130	$115,978
12	25	Brian Vickers	Chevrolet	Hendrick Motorsports	498	0	running	127	$93,340
13	2	Rusty Wallace	Dodge	Penske-Jasper Racing	498	157	running	134	$126,298
14	9	Kasey Kahne	Dodge	Evernham Motorsports	498	0	running	121	$117,615
15	24	Jeff Gordon	Chevrolet	Hendrick Motorsports	498	28	running	123	$130,576
16	17	Matt Kenseth	Ford	Roush Racing	497	50	running	120	$128,401
17	19	Jeremy Mayfield	Dodge	Evernham Motorsports	497	0	running	112	$110,260
18	44	Terry Labonte	Chevrolet	Hendrick Motorsports	496	10	running	114	$79,765
19	15	Michael Waltrip	Chevrolet	Dale Earnhardt, Inc.	496	19	running	111	$110,669
20	07	Dave Blaney	Chevrolet	Richard Childress Racing	495	0	running	103	$93,750
21	50	Jimmy Spencer	Dodge	Arnold Motorsports	492	0	running	100	$79,290
22	18	Bobby Labonte	Chevrolet	Joe Gibbs Racing	468	0	running	97	$117,315
23	49	Ken Schrader	Dodge	BAM Racing	467	0	running	94	$79,920
24	42	Jamie McMurray	Dodge	Chip Ganassi Racing	456	0	running	91	$90,290
25	21	Ricky Rudd	Ford	Wood Brothers Racing	452	0	running	88	$109,634
26	99	Carl Edwards	Ford	Roush Racing	447	0	running	85	$96,490
27	22	Scott Wimmer	Dodge	Bill Davis Racing	437	0	running	82	$103,813
28	5	Kyle Busch	Chevrolet	Hendrick Motorsports	428	0	running	79	$89,400
29	43	Jeff Green	Dodge	Petty Enterprises	427	0	running	76	$107,021
30	12	Ryan Newman	Dodge	Penske-Jasper Racing	418	0	running	73	$122,726
31	6	Mark Martin	Ford	Roush Racing	406	0	running	70	$95,440
32	66	Hermie Sadler	Ford	Peak Fitness Racing	395	0	running	67	$76,895
33	01	Joe Nemechek	Chevrolet	MBV Motorsports	393	0	running	64	$100,558
34	4	Mike Wallace	Chevrolet	Morgan–McClure Motorsports	379	0	crash	61	$76,785
35	97	Kurt Busch	Ford	Roush Racing	360	0	crash	58	$129,165
36	31	Jeff Burton	Chevrolet	Richard Childress Racing	358	0	crash	55	$106,020
37	0	Mike Bliss	Chevrolet	Haas CNC Racing	351	0	running	52	$79,635
38	11	Jason Leffler	Chevrolet	Joe Gibbs Racing	342	0	running	49	$76,585
39	32	Bobby Hamilton Jr.	Chevrolet	PPI Motorsports	330	0	crash	46	$86,077
40	08	Shane Hmiel	Chevrolet	Braun Racing	305	0	overheating	43	$76,465
41	92	Stanton Barrett	Chevrolet	Front Row Motorsports	83	0	oil pressure	40	$76,415
42	00	Carl Long	Chevrolet	McGlynn Racing	37	0	overheating	0	$76,365
43	41	Casey Mears	Dodge	Chip Ganassi Racing	20	0	crash	34	$86,293

Preceded by 2005 Golden Corral 500	NASCAR Nextel Cup Series Season; 2005	Succeeded by 2005 Advance Auto Parts 500
