= 2005 UAW-DaimlerChrysler 400 =

Race details
- Race 3 of 36 in the 2005 NASCAR Nextel Cup Series season
- 2005 UAW-DaimlerChrysler 400 program cover
- Date: March 13, 2005
- Official name: UAW-DaimlerChrysler 400
- Location: Las Vegas Motor Speedway, Las Vegas, Nevada
- Course: Permanent racing facility
- Course length: 1.5 miles (2.414 km)
- Distance: 267 laps, 400.5 mi (644.542 km)
- Average speed: 121.038 miles per hour (194.792 km/h)

Pole position
Driver	Ryan Newman	Penske Racing

Most laps led
Driver	Jimmie Johnson	Hendrick Motorsports
- Laps: 107

Winner
No. 48	Jimmie Johnson	Hendrick Motorsports

Television in the United States
- Network: Fox
- Announcers: Mike Joy, Darrell Waltrip and Larry McReynolds

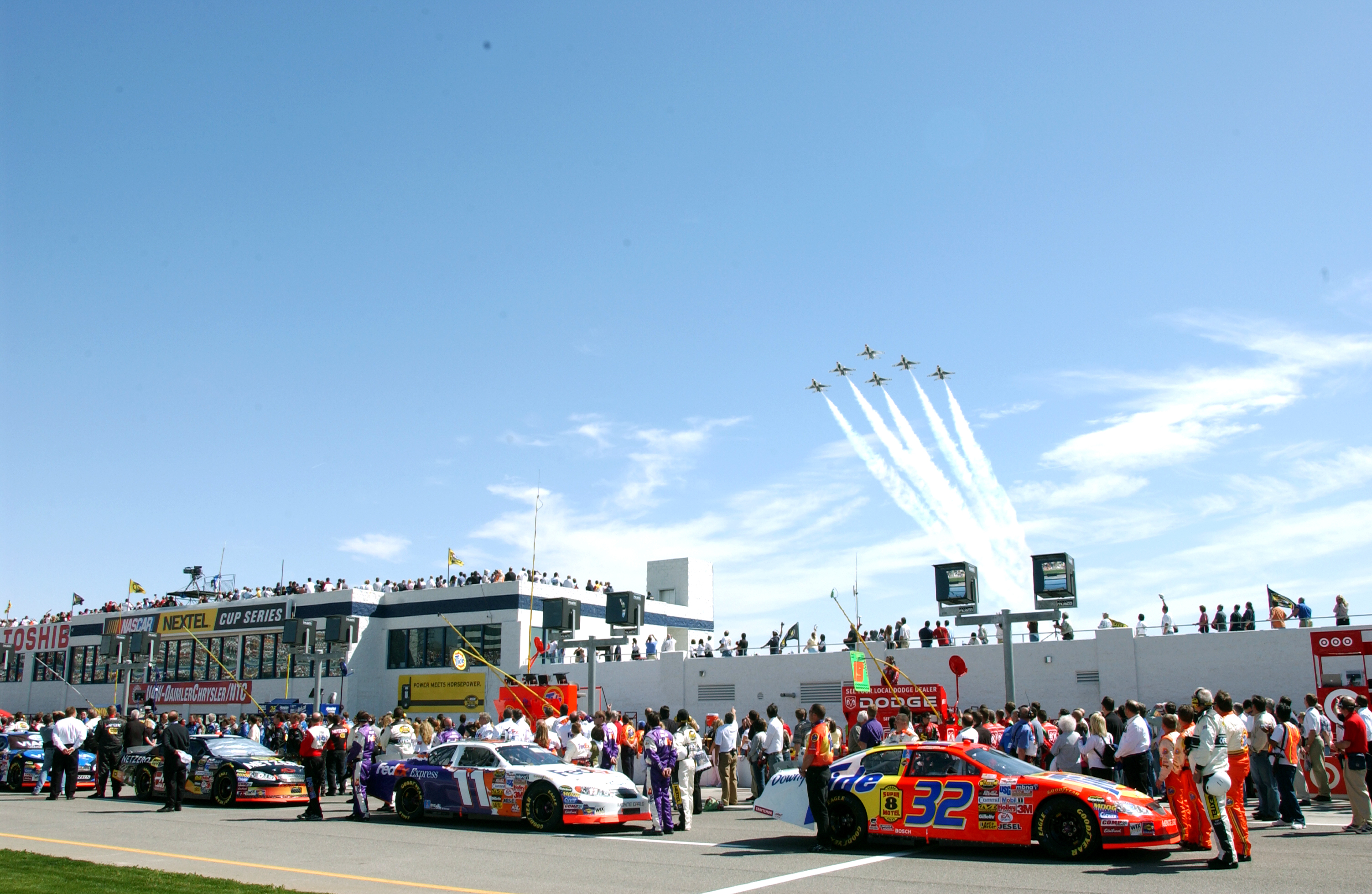
A flyover before the start of the race.

The 2005 UAW-DaimlerChrysler 400 was a NASCAR Nextel Cup Series race held on March 13, 2005 at Las Vegas Motor Speedway in Las Vegas, Nevada, United States. Contested at 267 laps on the 1.5-mile (2.4 km) speedway, it was the 3rd race of the 2005 NASCAR Nextel Cup Series season. Jimmie Johnson of Hendrick Motorsports won the race.

== Qualifying ==
Pos.	No.	Driver	Manufacturer	Sponsor	Avg. Speed	Time	Time behind driver
1	12	Ryan Newman	Dodge	Mobil 1 Ext. Perf. / ALLTEL	173.745	31.080	0.000
2	38	Elliott Sadler	Ford	M&M's	173.712	31.086	-0.006
3	16	Greg Biffle	Ford	National Guard	173.182	31.181	-0.101
4	10	Scott Riggs	Chevrolet	Valvoline	171.920	31.410	-0.330
5	97	Kurt Busch	Ford	Sharpie / IRWIN Industrial Tools	171.865	31.420	-0.340
6	77	Travis Kvapil	Dodge	Mobil Clean 5000 / Kodak / Jasper	171.717	31.447	-0.367
7	9	Kasey Kahne	Dodge	Dodge Dealers / UAW	171.527	31.482	-0.402
8	17	Matt Kenseth	Ford	DEWALT Power Tools	170.946	31.589	-0.509
9	48	Jimmie Johnson	Chevrolet	Lowe's	170.848	31.607	-0.527
10	5	Kyle Busch	Chevrolet	Kellogg's / Robots	170.832	31.610	-0.530
11	24	Jeff Gordon	Chevrolet	DuPont	170.336	31.702	-0.622
12	1	Joe Nemechek	Chevrolet	U.S. Army	170.283	31.712	-0.632
13	88	Dale Jarrett	Ford	UPS	169.934	31.777	-0.697
14	49	Ken Schrader	Dodge	Schwan's Home Service	169.886	31.786	-0.706
15	41	Casey Mears	Dodge	Energizer	169.854	31.792	-0.712
16	32	Bobby Hamilton Jr	Chevrolet	Tide	169.817	31.799	-0.719
17	11	Jason Leffler	Chevrolet	FedEx Express	169.806	31.801	-0.721
18	0	Mike Bliss	Chevrolet	NetZero Best Buy	169.753	31.811	-0.731
19	6	Mark Martin	Ford	Viagra	169.465	31.865	-0.785
20	99	Carl Edwards	Ford	World Financial Group	169.258	31.904	-0.824
21	2	Rusty Wallace	Dodge	Mobil Clean 7500 / Miller Lite	169.226	31.910	-0.830
22	42	Jamie McMurray	Dodge	Texaco / Havoline	169.199	31.915	-0.835
23	20	Tony Stewart	Chevrolet	The Home Depot	169.173	31.920	-0.840
24	31	Jeff Burton	Chevrolet	Cingular Wireless	169.125	31.929	-0.849
25	40	Sterling Marlin	Dodge	Coors Light	169.051	31.943	-0.863
26	19	Jeremy Mayfield	Dodge	Dodge Dealers / UAW	168.993	31.954	-0.874
27	7	Robby Gordon	Chevrolet	Harrah's	168.729	32.004	-0.924
28	22	Scott Wimmer	Dodge	Caterpillar	168.676	32.014	-0.934
29	7	Dave Blaney	Chevrolet	Jack Daniel's	168.503	32.047	-0.967
30	4	Mike Wallace	Chevrolet	Lucas Oil Products	168.439	32.059	-0.979
31	18	Bobby Labonte	Chevrolet	Interstate Batteries	168.345	32.077	-0.997
32	25	Brian Vickers	Chevrolet	GMAC / ditech.com	167.937	32.155	-1.075
33	21	Ricky Rudd	Ford	Motorcraft Genuine Parts	167.717	32.197	-1.117
34	8	Dale Earnhardt Jr	Chevrolet	Budweiser	167.198	32.297	-1.217
35	45	Kyle Petty	Dodge	Georgia-Pacific / Brawny	167.017	32.332	-1.252
36	15	Michael Waltrip	Chevrolet	NAPA Auto Parts	166.631	32.407	-1.327
37	14	John Andretti	Ford	VB / APlus at Sunoco	166.164	32.498	-1.418
38	34	Randy LaJoie	Chevrolet	Mach One Inc.	165.787	32.572	-1.492
39	43	Jeff Green	Dodge	Cheerios / Betty Crocker	165.695	32.590	-1.510
40	66	Hermie Sadler	Ford	Peak Fitness / Stratosphere LV	165.350	32.658	-1.578
41	73	Eric McClure	Chevrolet	ARC Dehooker / joinrfa.org	165.279	32.672	-1.592
42	29	Kevin Harvick	Chevrolet	GM Goodwrench	0.000	0.000	0.000
43	89	Morgan Shepherd	Dodge	Victory in Jesus / Red Line Oil	165.234	32.681	-1.601
Failed to qualify
44	09	Johnny Sauter	Dodge	Miccosukee Gaming & Resorts		32.695	
45	37	Kevin Lepage	Dodge	Carter's Royal Dispos-all		32.765	
46	92	Stanton Barrett	Chevrolet	Master Spas / First Trust Portfolios		32.838	
47	79	Stan Boyd	Chevrolet	Michigan Amber Alert		32.842	
48	00	Carl Long	Chevrolet	Buyer's Choice / Howes Lubricator		33.198	
49	27	Kirk Shelmerdine	Ford	Freddie B's	0.000	0.000	0.000

== Summary ==
The UAW-DaimlerChrysler 400 was run on Sunday, March 13, 2005 and is run over 267 laps of the Las Vegas Motor Speedway in Las Vegas, Nevada.

Ryan Newman started on the pole. Greg Biffle soon took over. The 1st caution came out on lap 12 when Dale Earnhardt Jr. touched Brian Vickers coming into turn 1. Bobby Labonte and Ricky Rudd were also involved. All 4 cars were out of the race. The race restarts on lap 20 and Kurt Busch had the lead, only for Biffle took it again soon afterwards.

Newman then got up to within 0.5 seconds of Biffle, and the lead remained for a long green-flag run; this would end on lap 59 when Robby Gordon's engine blew up, bringing out the 2nd caution. Sterling Marlin stayed out to lead a lap but at the restart, Newman was led over by Travis Kvapil and Greg Biffle in 2nd and 3rd positions respectively. Shortly after the restart, a crash occurred on lap 65, when Matt Kenseth nudged the back of Elliott Sadler's car; this would bring out the 3rd caution. Carl Edwards and Tony Stewart were also involved, though the latter's car only received minor damage.

The race restarted came on lap 70 with Newman taking the lead, having Kvapil, Jimmie Johnson, and Biffle behind him. On lap 77, Kenseth went a lap behind after a tire went down as a result of his crash with Sadler earlier.

Lap 86 brought out the 4th caution when Jason Leffler, trying to get onto pit road, got pushed by Ken Schrader. Most drivers pitted, with Kasey Kahne ending up in the lead from Newman and Kvapil. Ku. Busch was leading from Johnson and Biffle when the 6th caution came out on lap 126. An error in the pits, however, saw Kvapil drop to 23rd place.

Jimmie Johnson took the lead on lap 147. On lap 175, the 7th caution flew for debris, with Johnson still out in front. Newman took the green from Johnson, Busch, and Biffle. Trouble occurred when Scott Riggs brought out the eighth caution with 74 laps to go, with Sadler getting the free pass.

Newman, Johnson, and Joe Nemechek led at the restart, with Johnson swiftly regaining the lead. Debris brought out yet another caution with 62 laps to go. Newman and Johnson battled for the lead at the restart. With 44 to go, Hermie Sadler crashed into the inside wall bringing out another caution with Johnson leading over Gordon. The battle resumed with 39 laps left. Newman got into the back of Gordon with 34 laps to go, which caused them to lose 3 positions.

With 15 to go, Jimmie Johnson had got a 1.5-second lead over Kyle Busch, who was 5 seconds ahead of Ku. Busch. An error by Johnson lost him 0.8 seconds, but he then extended his lead again, and he won from the Busch brothers.

== Results ==
POS	ST	#	DRIVER	SPONSOR / OWNER	CAR	LAPS	MONEY	STATUS	LED	PTS
1	9	48	Jimmie Johnson	Lowe's (Rick Hendrick)	Chevrolet	267	428066	running	107	165
2	10	5	Kyle Busch	Kellogg's / Robots (Rick Hendrick)	Chevrolet	267	244800	running	0	145
3	5	97	Kurt Busch	Sharpie / Irwin Industrial Tools (Jack Roush)	Ford	267	249125	running	40	170
4	11	24	Jeff Gordon	DuPont (Rick Hendrick)	Chevrolet	267	197911	running	0	160
5	42	29	Kevin Harvick	GM Goodwrench (Richard Childress)	Chevrolet	267	179486	running	0	130
6	3	16	Greg Biffle	National Guard (Jack Roush)	Ford	267	139600	running	52	155
7	15	41	Casey Mears	Energizer (Chip Ganassi)	Dodge	267	139083	running	0	146
8	8	17	Matt Kenseth	DeWalt Power Tools (Jack Roush)	Ford	267	151111	running	0	142
9	1	12	Ryan Newman	Mobil 1 Ext. Performance / Alltel (Roger Penske)	Dodge	267	148511	running	44	143
10	23	20	Tony Stewart	The Home Depot (Joe Gibbs)	Chevrolet	267	147891	running	0	134
11	16	32	Bobby Hamilton Jr.	Tide (Cal Wells)	Chevrolet	267	117908	running	0	130
12	21	2	Rusty Wallace	Mobil Clean 7500 / Miller Lite (Roger Penske)	Dodge	267	129283	running	0	127
13	29	07	Dave Blaney	Jack Daniel's (Richard Childress)	Chevrolet	267	106100	running	7	129
14	20	99	Carl Edwards	World Financial Group (Jack Roush)	Ford	267	104025	running	0	121
15	22	42	Jamie McMurray	Texaco / Havoline (Chip Ganassi)	Dodge	267	105925	running	0	118
16	18	0	Mike Bliss	NetZero / Best Buy (Gene Haas)	Chevrolet	267	94925	running	0	115
17	24	31	Jeff Burton	Cingular Wireless (Richard Childress)	Chevrolet	267	118970	running	0	112
18	13	88	Dale Jarrett	UPS (Yates Racing)	Ford	267	125683	running	0	109
19	12	01	Joe Nemechek	U.S. Army (Nelson Bowers)	Chevrolet	267	112583	running	0	106
20	26	19	Jeremy Mayfield	Dodge Dealers / UAW (Ray Evernham)	Dodge	267	117220	running	0	103
21	36	15	Michael Waltrip	NAPA Auto Parts (Dale Earnhardt, Inc.)	Chevrolet	266	115439	running	0	100
22	17	11	Jason Leffler	FedEx Express (Joe Gibbs)	Chevrolet	266	84425	running	0	97
23	39	43	Jeff Green	Cheerios / Betty Crocker (Petty Enterprises)	Dodge	266	115061	running	1	99
24	30	4	Mike Wallace	Lucas Oil Products (Larry McClure)	Chevrolet	266	85950	running	1	96
25	35	45	Kyle Petty	Georgia-Pacific / Brawny (Petty Enterprises)	Dodge	266	95958	running	2	93
26	6	77	Travis Kvapil	Mobil Clean 5000 / Kodak / Jasper (Doug Bawel)	Dodge	266	90900	running	9	90
27	28	22	Scott Wimmer	Caterpillar (Bill Davis)	Dodge	266	98947	running	0	82
28	37	14	John Andretti	VB/APlus at Sunoco (Greg Pollex)	Ford	265	77900	running	0	79
29	2	38	Elliott Sadler	M&M's (Yates Racing)	Ford	265	117691	running	0	76
30	19	6	Mark Martin	Viagra (Jack Roush)	Ford	243	95950	running	0	73
31	4	10	Scott Riggs	Valvoline (James Rocco)	Chevrolet	243	85250	running	0	70
32	41	73	Eric McClure	ARC Dehooker / joinrfa.org (Ed Raabe)	Chevrolet	237	77050	engine	0	67
33	40	66	Hermie Sadler	Peak Fitness / Stratosphere LV (Jeff Stec)	Ford	226	77800	crash	0	64
34	14	49	Ken Schrader	Schwan's Home Service (Beth Ann Morgenthau)	Dodge	225	76650	running	0	61
35	25	40	Sterling Marlin	Coors Light (Chip Ganassi)	Dodge	219	104358	running	1	63
36	38	34	Randy LaJoie	Mach One Inc. (William Edwards)	Chevrolet	182	76250	engine	0	55
37	33	21	Ricky Rudd	Motorcraft Genuine Parts (Wood Brothers)	Ford	181	103239	running	0	52
38	7	9	Kasey Kahne	Dodge Dealers / UAW (Ray Evernham)	Dodge	154	107900	crash	1	54
39	27	7	Robby Gordon	Harrah's (Robby Gordon)	Chevrolet	57	75625	engine	0	46
40	43	89	Morgan Shepherd	Victory in Jesus / Red Line Oil (Morgan Shepherd)	Dodge	39	75400	engine	2	48
41	31	18	Bobby Labonte	Interstate Batteries (Joe Gibbs)	Chevrolet	15	109780	crash	0	40
42	34	8	Dale Earnhardt Jr.	Budweiser (Dale Earnhardt, Inc.)	Chevrolet	11	122433	crash	0	37
43	32	25	Brian Vickers	GMAC / ditech.com (Rick Hendrick)	Chevrolet	11	83166	crash	0	34
Failed to qualify
POS	NAME	NBR	SPONSOR	OWNER	CAR					
44	Johnny Sauter	09	Miccosukee Gaming & Resorts	James Finch	Dodge					
45	Kevin Lepage	37	Carter's Royal Dispos-all	John Carter	Dodge					
46	Stanton Barrett	92	Master Spas / First Trust Portfolios	Bob Jenkins	Chevrolet					
47	Stan Boyd	79	Michigan Amber Alert	John Conely	Chevrolet					
48	Carl Long	00	Buyer's Choice / Howes Lubricator	Raynard McGlynn	Chevrolet					
49	Kirk Shelmerdine	27	Freddie B's	Kirk Shelmerdine	Ford					

== Race Statistics ==
- Time of race: 3:18:32
- Average Speed: 121.038 miles per hour (194.792 km/h)
- Pole Speed: 173.745 miles per hour (279.615 km/h)
- Cautions: 10 for 46 laps
- Margin of Victory: 1.661 sec
- Lead changes: 25
- Percent of race run under caution: 17.2%
- Average green flag run: 20.1 laps
