= Raabe Racing Enterprises =

Former NASCAR team

- Owner: Ed Raabe
- Base: Daytona Beach, Florida, United States
- Series: Nextel Cup Series
- Race drivers: Eric McClure, Dan Pardus
- Manufacturer: Chevrolet

Career
- Races competed: 1

Raabe Racing Enterprises is an American auto racing team that drove in the NASCAR Nextel Cup Series. It was run by businessman Ed Raabe and owned by a family trust. The family trust got into racing when it was originally part owner of the No. 13 Daytona Speed Inc. driven by Greg Sacks. After 2004, Sacks claimed that Raabe "took off" with several cars and the ARC DeHooker sponsorship to field the No. 73 team. Due to the split with Greg Sacks, the team then purchased cars from McClure Motor Sports leaving Greg Sacks in possession of the cars he failed to qualify with. Since the Raabe Family is actually the owner of ARC DEHOOKER, INC. they had every right to sponsor another team and do whatever was necessary to continue its marketing campaign. The team only ran one race, at Las Vegas Motor Speedway with Eric McClure driving, qualifying 41st and finishing 32nd due to engine failure. McClure resigned after that race. After McClure resigned, the team attempted the Pepsi 400 with Dan Pardus as the driver, but failed to qualify.

Raabe Racing Enterprises is still in business running its operation from Bunnell, Florida and continuing to build engines and hot rods for the public. Raabe Racing Enterprises recently co-sponsored the Daytona Dream Cruise and was host to the many who attended this event at their location on Mason Av in Daytona Beach. Due to circumstances beyond their control, they recently moved to Bunnell and continue to operate from their US 1 location.

== Car No. 73 results ==
Year	Driver	No.	Make	1	2	3	4	5	6	7	8	9	10	11	12	13	14	15	16	17	18	19	20	21	22	23	24	25	26	27	28	29	30	31	32	33	34	35	36	Owners	Pts
2005	Eric McClure	73	Chevy	DAY; DNQ	CAL; DNQ	LVS; 32	ATL	BRI	MAR	TEX	PHO	TAL	DAR	RCH	CLT	DOV	POC	MCH	SON																					62nd	111
2005	Dan Pardus	73	Chevy																	DAY; Wth	CHI	NHA	POC	IND	GLN	MCH	BRI	CAL	RCH	NHA	DOV	TAL	KAN	CLT	MAR	ATL	TEX	PHO	HOM	62nd	111
