= Eric McClure =

American stock car racing driver (1978–2021)

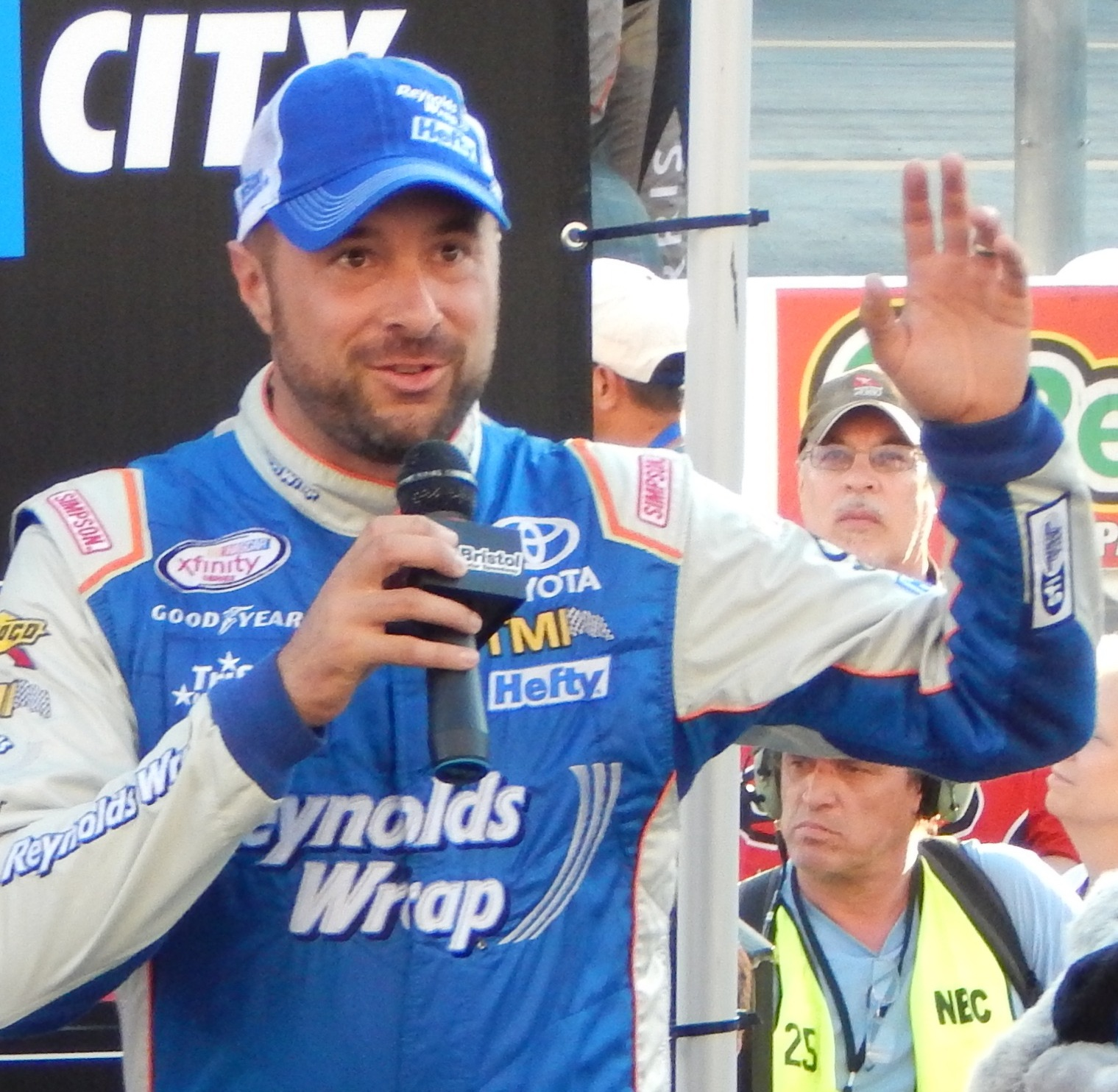
- McClure at Bristol Motor Speedway in 2015
- Born: Eric Wayne McClure; December 11, 1978; Chilhowie, Virginia, U.S.
- Died: May 2, 2021 (aged 42); Abingdon, Virginia, U.S.

NASCAR Cup Series career
- 3 races run over 3 years
- 2014 position: 74th
- Best finish: 67th (2006)
- First race: 2004 Aaron's 499 (Talladega)
- Last race: 2006 UAW-Ford 500 (Talladega)
Wins	Top tens	Poles
0	0	0

NASCAR O'Reilly Auto Parts Series career
- 288 races run over 14 years
- 2016 position: 73rd
- Best finish: 16th (2012)
- First race: 2003 Target House 200 (Rockingham)
- Last race: 2016 PowerShares QQQ 300 (Daytona)
Wins	Top tens	Poles
0	1	0
- Statistics up to date as of February 20, 2016.

Eric Wayne McClure (December 11, 1978 – May 2, 2021) was an American professional stock car racing driver and team owner. He last competed part-time in the NASCAR Xfinity Series, driving the No. 0 Chevrolet Camaro for JD Motorsports.

== Racing career ==
=== Sprint Cup Series ===
McClure made three career starts in NASCAR's Cup Series. His debut came at Talladega, driving the No. 04 I Can Learn Chevy in 2004. He made the field in 35th position, and went on to finish 26th. McClure then attempted to make the July race at Daytona, but did not qualify.

McClure then landed a ride with the No. 73 Raabe Racing Enterprises Chevy for 2005. McClure did not qualify for the first two races, but did make the race at Las Vegas, starting 41st. His engine blew midway through the race and relegated McClure to 32nd. McClure left the team that week and did not run until August, when he attempted three races with Front Row Motorsports. However, McClure did not make any of those races. In 2006, he attempted and made the UAW-Ford 500, where handling issues relegated him to a 32nd-place finish in the No. 04 Morgan-McClure Motorsports Chevy, with a sponsorship from Hefty. In 2008, McClure attempted the Daytona 500 in the No. 37 Front Row Motorsports Chevy sponsored by Hefty, but failed to qualify.

On April 11, 2009, Morgan-McClure Motorsports announced they would be attempting the Talladega race in April, after a year and a half absence from the sport. McClure attempted to qualify the Hefty-sponsored No. 4 Chevrolet but did not make the field.

In January 2014, McClure announced that he would attempt to compete in the 2014 Daytona 500 driving the No. 35 Ford for Front Row Motorsports; he failed to qualify for the race. In May 2014, McClure returned to the No. 35 car for Front Row Motorsports at Talladega, but failed to make the race.

=== Xfinity Series ===
McClure made his Busch Series debut in 2003, running at Rockingham Speedway. He qualified the No. 05 I Can Learn Chevy in 22nd and finished 26th despite an accident.

McClure made four starts in 2004, running two races for his family team (MMM) and two more for Mac Hill Motorsports. His best run was at Memphis, where he finished 22nd. He also finished three of his four starts.

McClure added eight starts in 2005, seven for Means Racing, but only managed a best finish of 30th at Texas. McClure did attract the eye of James Finch and ran one race for that team at Daytona. However, he finished 32nd with a blown engine and did not follow that run up with any starts, returning to Means. McClure did not qualify for two races. At Bristol, McClure was sent home because of a rainout of qualifying, and at Memphis, McClure missed the field by one spot.

For the 2007 season, McClure teamed up with Davis Motorsports for a 32 race schedule. McClure brought sponsor Hefty to the team with him.

He drove for Front Row Motorsports in the Busch Series in 2008, with Hefty sponsoring the car for all the races in the No. 24 Chevrolet. He scored his best career finish of 15th in the Aaron's 312 at Talladega.

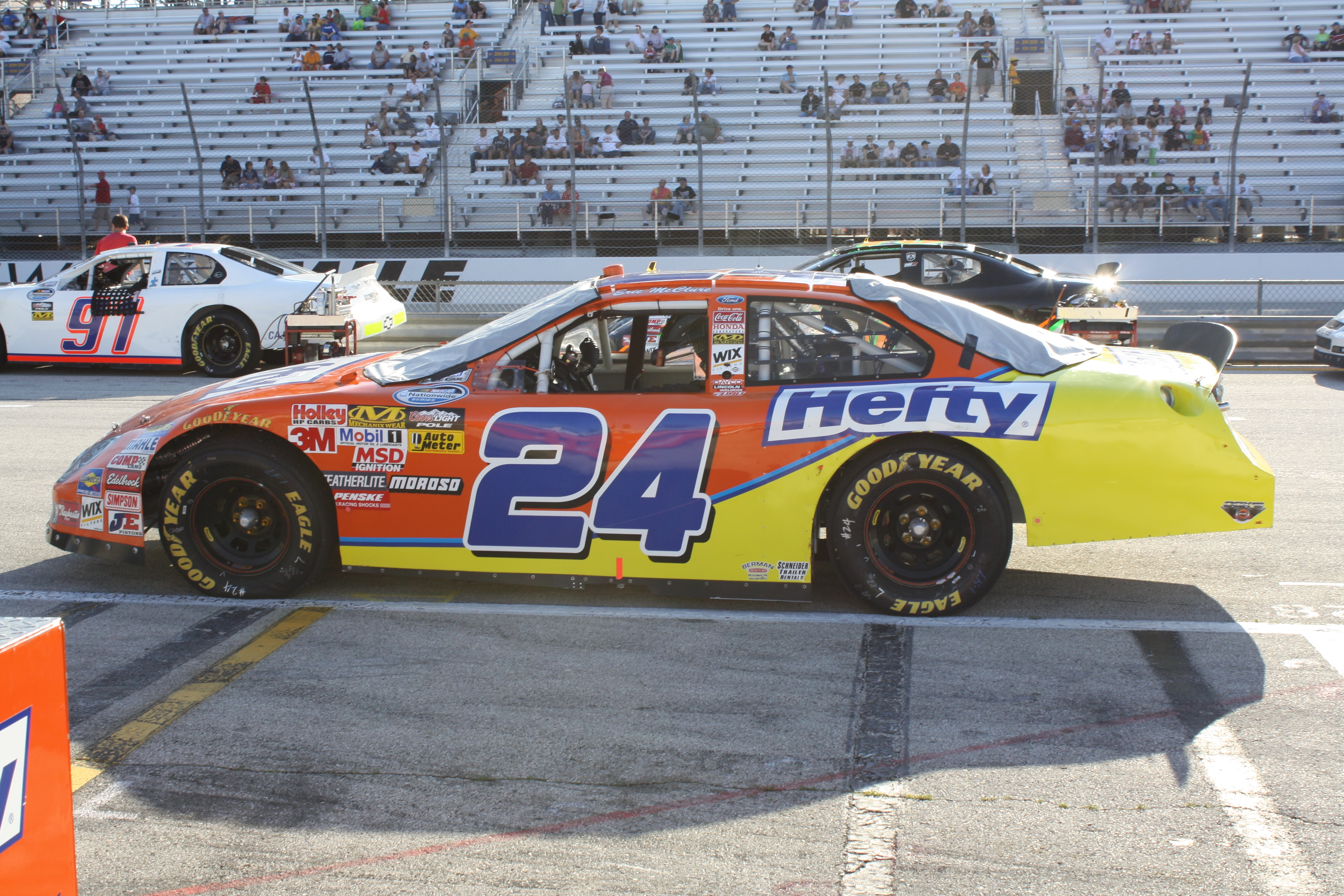
2009 Nationwide car at the Milwaukee Mile

In 2009, he and sponsor Hefty moved to Rensi/Hamilton Racing, where he drove the No. 24 Ford Fusion. This proved to be a good move; he qualified for every race and finished a career best 17th in the final points standings. McClure stuck with the team, now Team Rensi Motorsports, for 2010. However, performance slipped and the economic downturn forced McClure to be cautious with the team's equipment, with Rensi bringing a second team over for COT races that was raced by Kelly Bires. Despite this, McClure finished 24th in points but announced his departure from Rensi on November 30. According to McClure, Rensi's budget was so low to the point that they would rarely have full tire allotments for the races after Las Vegas, with most of the allotments going to the races run with Bires.

McClure announced on December 1, 2010, that he and Hefty would move to TriStar Motorsports for 2011 alongside series veterans Mike Bliss and Jeff Green. It was further announced in January that TriStar Motorsports will change their car numbers, with McClure piloting the No. 14 Hefty Blackout Toyota. McClure would suffer his second career concussion after a hard crash at the Subway Jalapeño 250 at Daytona in July. He would finish the season nineteenth in points.

During the 2012 Aaron's 312, McClure was involved in a 16-car pile up on lap 117, when cars spun in front of him and he slammed the inside wall head on. McClure was extracted from his car. He was airlifted to the University of Alabama Hospital in Birmingham, Alabama, for further evaluation. NASCAR stated that McClure was talking to the rescue crew while he was being extracted from his car. After staying two nights in the hospital, TriStar Motorsports team spokesperson Emily Brandt announced on May 6, 2012, that McClure had suffered another concussion, the third of his career, and internal bruises from the accident. On May 9, TriStar announced that McClure would sit out the Nationwide race at Darlington due to his concussion, and that start and park driver Jeff Green would drive the No. 14 while Tony Raines and Kevin Lepage would start and park the No. 10. McClure would sit out the next four races before being cleared by NASCAR to drive in time for the race at Road America. In spite of starting only 28 races, McClure finished the 2012 season with a career best points finish of sixteenth.

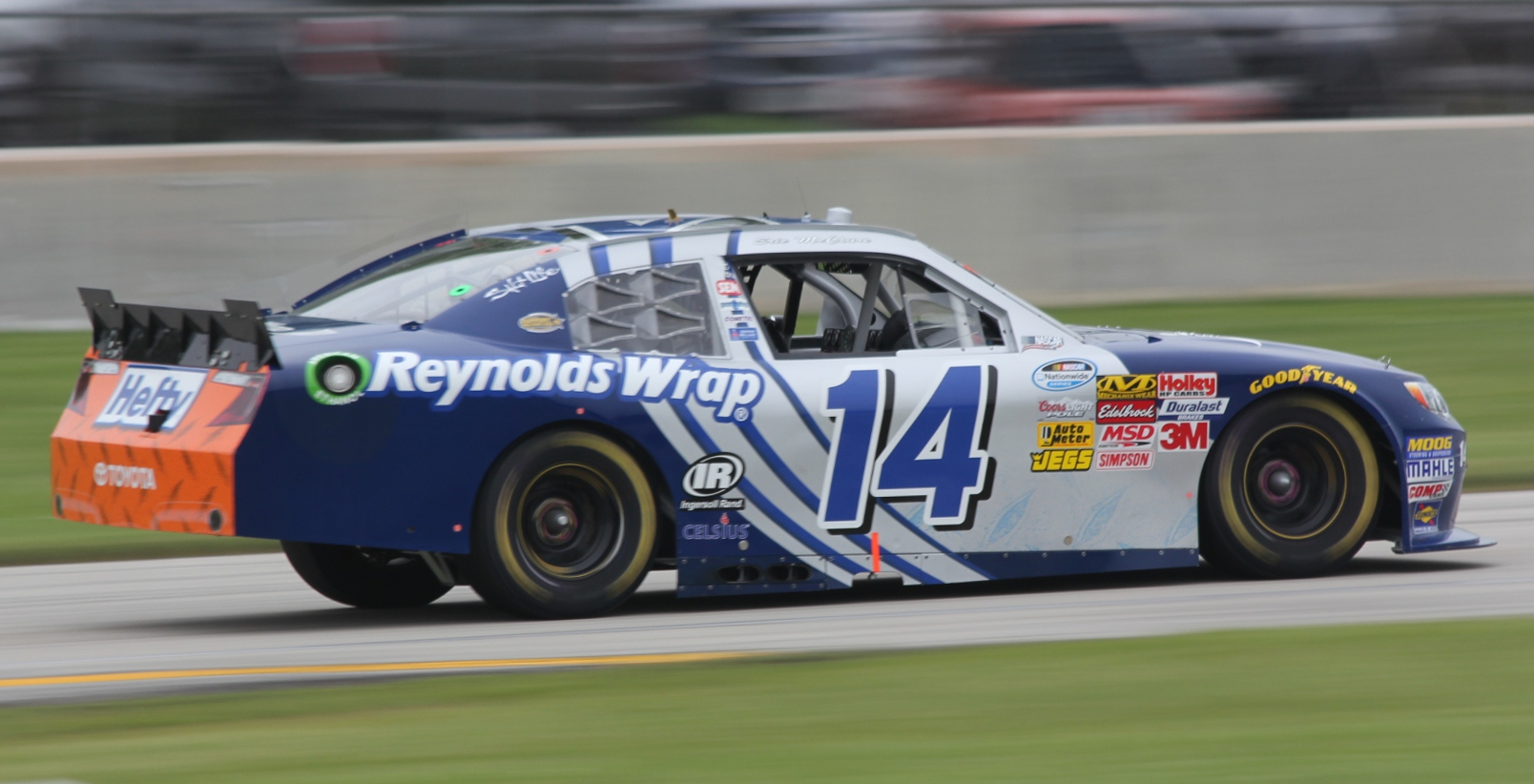
2014 Nationwide car at Road America

On January 9, 2013, TriStar announced that McClure would return to their team for the 2013 season. McClure started his season on a high note by taking his best career finish of eighth at Daytona. In August, however, he was hospitalized with what was determined to be acute renal failure; he was forced to step out of the No. 14 car for four races while he recovered, being substituted for again by Jeff Green. McClure returned to competition in September at Chicagoland Speedway. He missed a race later in the year at Texas Motor Speedway due to medical issues, before being hospitalized again prior to the season finale at Homestead-Miami Speedway.

Before the 2014 season, McClure announced that he would only be running a partial schedule in the Nationwide Series.

In 2015, McClure and his sponsors moved to JGL Racing, where he drove the No. 24 Toyota Camry at all 33 races. After nine races however, both he and JGL parted ways and McClure returned to TriStar Motorsports for the rest of the season, with JGL allowing him to continue to run the 24 car for that team. At the fall race at Kentucky, McClure would suffer his fourth concussion, in a single car crash in turn three.

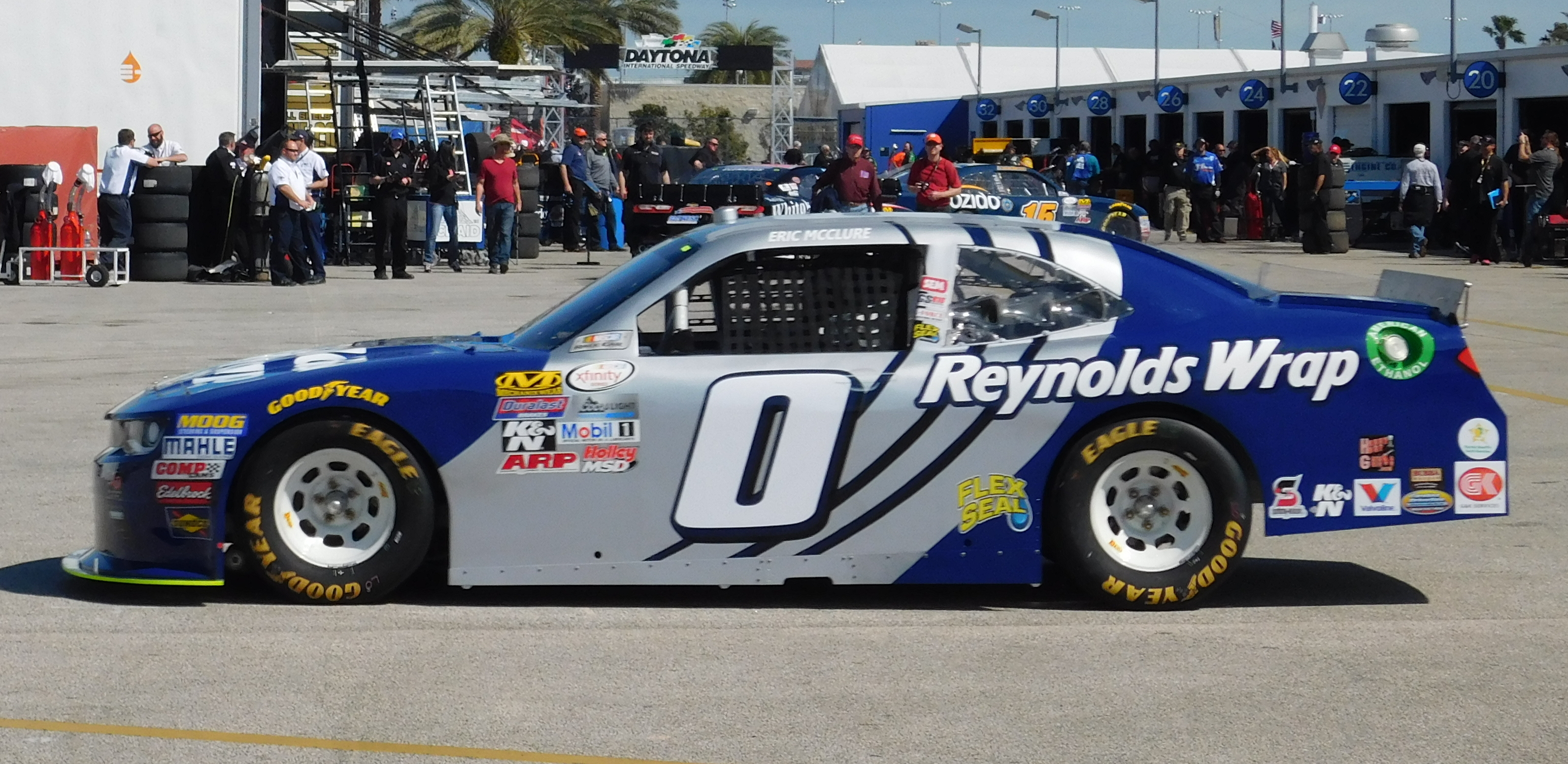
2016 Xfinity car at Daytona International Speedway

In 2016, McClure joined JD Motorsports for the season opener at Daytona, driving the No. 0 Chevrolet Camaro.

=== Team ownership ===
On July 28, 2015, McClure and former Nationwide driver Hal Martin formed Martin-McClure Racing, a K&N Pro Series East team. Among the team's drivers were Chad Finchum and Austin Cindric.

McClure stepped away from the team in 2018 after his domestic violence arrest.

== Personal life ==
McClure was born in Chilhowie, Virginia, and was a graduate of Emory and Henry College. He was married to Miranda from 2004 until their divorce in 2018, and had seven daughters.

McClure's home in Abingdon, Virginia, suffered major damage in an April 27, 2011 tornado. However, McClure and his family sat out the storm in their basement and were uninjured.

On February 11, 2018, McClure was arrested for domestic violence. McClure plead no contest to a misdemeanor domestic violence charge and sentenced to 12 months probation, substance abuse counseling, and was ordered to undergo a mental health assessment. McClure's ex-wife said that McClure choked her and hit her in front of their children.

== Death ==
McClure died on May 2, 2021, at the age of 42 after suffering from serious health issues, including diagnosis of a severe musculoskeletal disorder in the summer of 2019. He was engaged to Keira Brinegar Tibbs at the time of his death.

== Motorsports career results ==
=== NASCAR ===
(key) (Bold – Pole position awarded by qualifying time. Italics – Pole position earned by points standings or practice time. * – Most laps led.)

==== Sprint Cup Series ====
NASCAR Sprint Cup Series results
Year	Team	No.	Make	1	2	3	4	5	6	7	8	9	10	11	12	13	14	15	16	17	18	19	20	21	22	23	24	25	26	27	28	29	30	31	32	33	34	35	36	NSCC	Pts	Ref
2004	Morgan-McClure Motorsports	04	Chevy	DAY	CAR	LVS	ATL	DAR	BRI	TEX	MAR	TAL; 26	CAL	RCH	CLT	DOV	POC	MCH	SON	DAY; DNQ	CHI	NHA	POC	IND	GLN	MCH	BRI	CAL	RCH	NHA	DOV	TAL	KAN	CLT	MAR	ATL	PHO	DAR	HOM	78th	90	
2005	Raabe Racing Enterprises	73	Chevy	DAY; DNQ	CAL; DNQ	LVS; 32	ATL	BRI	MAR	TEX	PHO	TAL	DAR	RCH	CLT	DOV	POC																							80th	67	
2005	Front Row Motorsports	92	Chevy															MCH; DNQ	SON	DAY	CHI	NHA	POC	IND	GLN	MCH; DNQ	BRI	CAL	RCH	NHA	DOV	TAL								80th	67	
2005	Mach 1 Motorsports	34	Chevy																														KAN; DNQ	CLT	MAR	ATL	TEX	PHO	HOM	80th	67	
2006	Morgan-McClure Motorsports	04	Chevy	DAY	CAL	LVS	ATL	BRI	MAR	TEX	PHO	TAL	RCH	DAR	CLT	DOV	POC	MCH	SON	DAY	CHI	NHA	POC	IND	GLN	MCH	BRI	CAL	RCH	NHA	DOV	KAN	TAL; 31	CLT	MAR	ATL	TEX	PHO	HOM	67th	70	
2007	Morgan-McClure Motorsports	04	Chevy	DAY; DNQ	CAL	LVS	ATL	BRI	MAR	TEX	PHO	TAL	RCH	DAR	CLT	DOV	POC	MCH	SON	NHA	DAY; DNQ	CHI	IND	POC	GLN	MCH	BRI	CAL	RCH	NHA	DOV	KAN	TAL	CLT	MAR	ATL	TEX	PHO	HOM	NA	-	
2008	Front Row Motorsports	37	Chevy	DAY; DNQ	CAL	LVS	ATL	BRI	MAR	TEX	PHO	TAL	RCH	DAR	CLT	DOV	POC	MCH	SON	NHA	DAY	CHI	IND	POC	GLN	MCH	BRI	CAL	RCH	NHA	DOV	KAN	TAL	CLT	MAR	ATL	TEX	PHO	HOM	82nd	0	
2009	Morgan-McClure Motorsports	4	Chevy	DAY	CAL	LVS	ATL	BRI	MAR	TEX	PHO	TAL; DNQ	RCH	DAR	CLT	DOV	POC	MCH	SON	NHA	DAY	CHI	IND	POC	GLN	MCH	BRI	ATL	RCH	NHA	DOV	KAN	CAL	CLT	MAR	TAL	TEX	PHO	HOM	73rd	0	
2014	Front Row Motorsports	35	Ford	DAY; DNQ	PHO	LVS	BRI	CAL	MAR	TEX	DAR	RCH	TAL; DNQ	KAN	CLT	DOV	POC	MCH	SON	KEN	DAY	NHA	IND	POC	GLN	MCH	BRI	ATL	RCH	CHI	NHA	DOV	KAN	CLT	TAL	MAR	TEX	PHO	HOM	74th	0^{1}	

===== Daytona 500 =====
Year	Team	Manufacturer	Start	Finish
2005	Raabe Racing Enterprises	Chevrolet	DNQ	
2007	Morgan-McClure Motorsports	Chevrolet	DNQ	
2008	Front Row Motorsports	Chevrolet	DNQ	
2014	Front Row Motorsports	Ford	DNQ	

==== Xfinity Series ====
NASCAR Xfinity Series results
Year	Team	No.	Make	1	2	3	4	5	6	7	8	9	10	11	12	13	14	15	16	17	18	19	20	21	22	23	24	25	26	27	28	29	30	31	32	33	34	35	NXSC	Pts	Ref
2003	Morgan-McClure Motorsports	05	Chevy	DAY	CAR	LVS	DAR	BRI	TEX	TAL	NSH	CAL	RCH	GTY	NZH	CLT	DOV	NSH	KEN	MLW	DAY	CHI	NHA	PPR	IRP	MCH	BRI	DAR	RCH	DOV	KAN	CLT	MEM	ATL	PHO	CAR; 26	HOM		130th	85	
2004	Morgan-McClure Motorsports	04	Chevy	DAY	CAR	LVS; 30	DAR	BRI	TEX	NSH	TAL	CAL	GTY	RCH	NZH	CLT	DOV	NSH	KEN	MLW	DAY	CHI	NHA	PPR	IRP				RCH; DNQ	DOV	KAN	CLT; DNQ	MEM; 22	ATL	PHO	DAR	HOM; DNQ		82nd	268	
2004	Mac Hill Motorsports	56	Chevy																							MCH; 33	BRI; 43	CAL											82nd	268	
2005	Jimmy Means Racing	52	Ford	DAY	CAL	MXC	LVS	ATL	NSH; 41		TEX; 30	PHO; 38	TAL	DAR; DNQ	RCH; DNQ	CLT; DNQ	DOV	NSH; 31	KEN	MLW; 34		CHI; DNQ	NHA; DNQ	PPR; 40	GTY; DNQ	IRP	GLN	MCH; DNQ		CAL; 39	RCH	DOV	KAN	CLT					72nd	440	
2005	Morgan-McClure Motorsports	04	Chevy							BRI; DNQ																			BRI; DNQ						MEM; DNQ		PHO; DNQ	HOM	72nd	440	
2005	Phoenix Racing	09	Dodge																		DAY; 32																		72nd	440	
2005	Davis Motorsports	0	Chevy																																	TEX; DNQ			72nd	440	
2006	Morgan-McClure Motorsports	04	Chevy	DAY	CAL	MXC	LVS	ATL	BRI	TEX	NSH	PHO	TAL	RCH	DAR	CLT; DNQ	DOV	NSH		MLW	DAY	CHI	NHA	MAR	GTY	IRP	GLN	MCH	BRI; 41	CAL	RCH	DOV	KAN	CLT; DNQ	MEM	TEX	PHO	HOM	125th	74	
2006	MacDonald Motorsports	72	Chevy																KEN; 43																				125th	74	
2007	D.D.L. Motorsports	0	Chevy	DAY; 35	CAL; 40	MXC	LVS; 26	ATL; 37	BRI; 24	NSH; 26	TEX; 29	PHO; 30	TAL; 18	RCH; DNQ	DAR; 40	CLT; DNQ	DOV; 28	NSH; 35	KEN; 32	MLW; 31	NHA; 37	DAY; 36	CHI; 41	GTY; 37	IRP; 29	CGV	GLN	MCH; DNQ	BRI; 42	CAL; 37	RCH; 42	DOV; 26	KAN; 42	CLT; DNQ	MEM; 28	TEX; 40	PHO; DNQ	HOM; DNQ	38th	1639	
2008	Front Row Motorsports	24	Chevy	DAY; 34	CAL; 28	LVS; 22	ATL; 33	BRI; 30	NSH; 31	TEX; 36	PHO; 29	MXC	TAL; 15	RCH; 32	DAR; 33	CLT; 29	DOV; 26	NSH; 28	KEN; 28	MLW; 29	NHA; 27	DAY; 38	CHI; 32	GTY; 21	IRP; 27	CGV	GLN	MCH; 27	BRI; 31	CAL; 32	RCH; 29	DOV; 24	KAN; 33	CLT; 22	MEM; 27	TEX; 32	PHO; 32	HOM; 32	21st	2429	
2009	Rensi-Hamilton Racing	24	Ford	DAY; 26	CAL; 30	LVS; 16	BRI; 26	TEX; 34	NSH; 26	PHO; 22	TAL; 25	RCH; 39	DAR; 28	CLT; 19	DOV; 23	NSH; 22	KEN; 30		NHA; 33	DAY; 28	CHI; 31	GTY; 23	IRP; 23	IOW; 20	GLN; 30	MCH; 28	BRI; 25	CGV; 22	ATL; 26	RCH; 29	DOV; 24	KAN; 25	CAL; 28	CLT; 18	MEM; 30	TEX; 19	PHO; 28	HOM; 28	17th	2962	
2009	Rensi-Hamilton Racing	24	Chevy															MLW; 32																					17th	2962	
2010	Rensi-Hamilton Racing	24	Ford	DAY; 17	CAL; 35	LVS; 21	BRI; 24	NSH; 29	PHO; 27	TEX; 28	TAL; 22	RCH; 31	DAR; 27	DOV; 24	CLT; 29	NSH; 26	KEN; 29	ROA; 27	NHA; 29	DAY; 36	CHI; 29	GTY; 26	IRP; 26	IOW; DNQ	GLN; 31	MCH; 30	BRI; DNQ	CGV	ATL; 30	RCH; 30	DOV; 29	KAN; 33	CAL; DNQ	CLT; 23	GTY; DNQ	TEX; 26	PHO; DNQ	HOM; 37	24th	2304	
2011	TriStar Motorsports	14	Chevy	DAY; 33	PHO; 25	LVS; 20	BRI; 25	CAL; 21	TEX; 31	TAL; 26	NSH; 32	RCH; 32	DAR; 36		IOW; 23	CLT; 28	CHI; 18	MCH; 29	ROA; 27	DAY; 37	KEN; 27	NHA; 20	NSH; 23	IRP; 21	IOW; 26	GLN; 35	CGV; 36	BRI; 27	ATL; 28	RCH; 30	CHI; 25	DOV; 24	KAN; 31	CLT; 31	TEX; 24	PHO; 19	HOM; 29		19th	572	
2011	TriStar Motorsports	19	Chevy											DOV; 25																									19th	572	
2012	TriStar Motorsports	14	Toyota	DAY; 22	PHO; 28	LVS; 25	BRI; 27	CAL; 26	TEX; 24	RCH; 31	TAL; 27	DAR	IOW	CLT	DOV	MCH	ROA; 21	KEN; 26	DAY; 18	NHA; 22	CHI; 24	IND; 24	IOW; 31	GLN; 26	CGV; 19	BRI; 27	ATL; 21	RCH; 26	CHI; 25	KEN; 22	DOV; 26	CLT; 22	KAN; 15	TEX; 21	PHO; 20	HOM; 27			16th	559	
2013	TriStar Motorsports	14	Toyota	DAY; 8	PHO; 29	LVS; 40	BRI; 21	CAL; 27	TEX; 30	RCH; 26	TAL; 23	DAR; 26	CLT; 30	DOV; 24	IOW; 18	MCH; 28	ROA; 27	KEN; 23	DAY; 24	NHA; 31	CHI; 28	IND; 31	IOW; 23	GLN; 28	MOH	BRI	ATL	RCH	CHI; 25	KEN; 24	DOV; 26	KAN; 27	CLT; 33	TEX	PHO; 27	HOM			20th	482	
2014	TriStar Motorsports	14	Toyota	DAY; 35	PHO; 23	LVS; 27	BRI; 27	CAL; 25	TEX; 24	DAR; 21	RCH; 29	TAL; 17	IOW; 24	CLT; 29	DOV	MCH	ROA; 20	KEN; 24	DAY; 22	NHA; 26	CHI; 25	IND; 36	IOW; 23	GLN; 24	MOH	BRI; 20	ATL; 24	RCH	CHI; 26	KEN; 31	DOV	KAN; 19	CLT; 32	TEX; 26	PHO; 26	HOM; 26			19th	521	
2015	JGL Racing	24	Toyota	DAY; 17	ATL; 28	LVS; 23	PHO; 29	CAL; 34	TEX; 29	BRI; 26	RCH; 36	TAL; 21																											19th	565	
2015	TriStar Motorsports	24	Toyota										IOW; 33	CLT; 30	DOV; 24	MCH; 23	CHI; 26	DAY; 24	KEN; 27	NHA; 18	IND; 29	IOW; 26	GLN; 24	MOH; 35	BRI; 33	ROA; 23	DAR; 28	RCH; 26	CHI; 27	KEN; 29	DOV; 22	CLT; 28	KAN; 26	TEX; 28	PHO; 26	HOM; 29			19th	565	
2016	JD Motorsports	0	Chevy	DAY; 30	ATL	LVS	PHO	CAL	TEX	BRI	RCH	TAL	DOV	CLT	POC	MCH	IOW	DAY	KEN	NHA	IND	IOW	GLN	MOH	BRI	ROA	DAR	RCH	CHI	KEN	DOV	CLT	KAN	TEX	PHO	HOM			73rd	11	

==== Craftsman Truck Series ====
NASCAR Craftsman Truck Series results
Year	Team	No.	Make	1	2	3	4	5	6	7	8	9	10	11	12	13	14	15	16	17	18	19	20	21	22	23	24	25	NCTC	Pts	Ref
2004	RAW Racing	27	Chevy	DAY	ATL	MAR	MFD	CLT	DOV	TEX	MEM	MLW	KAN	KEN	GTW	MCH	IRP; DNQ	NSH											NA	-	
2004	RAW Racing	72	Chevy																BRI; DNQ	RCH	NHA	LVS	CAL	TEX	MAR	PHO	DAR	HOM	NA	-	

==== Goody's Dash Series ====
NASCAR Goody's Dash Series results
Year	Team	No.	Make	1	2	3	4	5	6	7	8	9	10	11	12	13	14	NGDS	Pts	Ref
2002	N/A	14	Pontiac	DAY	HAR	ROU	LON	CLT	KEN	MEM	GRE	SNM	SBO	MYB	BRI; 17	MOT	ATL; DNQ	47th	200	
