= 1998 DieHard 500 =

Ninth race of the 1998 NASCAR Winston Cup Series

Race details
- Race 9 of 33 in the 1998 NASCAR Winston Cup Series
- The 1998 DieHard 500 program cover, featuring Mark Martin.
- Date: April 26, 1998
- Official name: 29th Annual DieHard 500
- Location: Lincoln, Alabama, Talladega Superspeedway
- Course: Permanent racing facility
- Course length: 2.66 miles (4.28 km)
- Distance: 188 laps, 500.08 mi (804.8 km)
- Average speed: 142.428 miles per hour (229.216 km/h)

Pole position
Driver	Bobby Labonte	Joe Gibbs Racing
- Time: 48.925

Most laps led
Driver	Terry Labonte	Hendrick Motorsports
- Laps: 88

Winner
No. 18	Bobby Labonte	Joe Gibbs Racing

Television in the United States
- Network: ABC
- Announcers: Bob Jenkins, Benny Parsons

Radio in the United States
- Radio: Motor Racing Network

The 1998 DieHard 500 was the ninth stock car race of the 1998 NASCAR Winston Cup Series season and the 29th iteration of the event. The race was held on Sunday, April 26, 1998, in Lincoln, Alabama at Talladega Superspeedway, a 2.66 miles (4.28 km) permanent triangle-shaped superspeedway. The race took the scheduled 188 laps to complete. In the final laps of the race, Joe Gibbs Racing driver Bobby Labonte would make a pass on Terry Labonte with two to go and fend off the field to take his seventh career NASCAR Winston Cup Series victory and his second and final victory of the season. To fill out the podium, Travis Carter Enterprises driver Jimmy Spencer and Robert Yates Racing driver Dale Jarrett would finish second and third, respectively.

== Background ==
The layout of Talladega Superspeedway, the venue where the race was held.

Talladega Superspeedway is a motorsports complex located north of Talladega, Alabama. It is located on the former Anniston Air Force Base in the small city of Lincoln. The track is a tri-oval and was constructed in the 1960s by the International Speedway Corporation, a business controlled by the France family. Talladega is most known for its steep banking and the unique location of the start/finish line that's located just past the exit to pit road. Talladega is the longest NASCAR oval with a length of 2.66-mile-long (4.28 km) tri-oval like the Daytona International Speedway, which also is a 2.5-mile-long (4 km) tri-oval.

=== Entry list ===
- (R) denotes rookie driver.

#	Driver	Team	Make
1	Darrell Waltrip	Dale Earnhardt, Inc.	Chevrolet
2	Rusty Wallace	Penske-Kranefuss Racing	Ford
3	Dale Earnhardt	Richard Childress Racing	Chevrolet
4	Bobby Hamilton	Morgan–McClure Motorsports	Chevrolet
5	Terry Labonte	Hendrick Motorsports	Chevrolet
6	Mark Martin	Roush Racing	Ford
7	Geoff Bodine	Mattei Motorsports	Ford
07	Dan Pardus	Midwest Transit Racing	Chevrolet
8	Hut Stricklin	Stavola Brothers Racing	Chevrolet
9	Lake Speed	Melling Racing	Ford
10	Ricky Rudd	Rudd Performance Motorsports	Ford
11	Brett Bodine	Brett Bodine Racing	Ford
12	Jeremy Mayfield	Penske-Kranefuss Racing	Ford
13	Jerry Nadeau (R)	Elliott-Marino Racing	Ford
16	Ted Musgrave	Roush Racing	Ford
18	Bobby Labonte	Joe Gibbs Racing	Pontiac
21	Michael Waltrip	Wood Brothers Racing	Ford
22	Ward Burton	Bill Davis Racing	Pontiac
23	Jimmy Spencer	Haas-Carter Motorsports	Ford
24	Jeff Gordon	Hendrick Motorsports	Chevrolet
26	Johnny Benson Jr.	Roush Racing	Ford
28	Kenny Irwin Jr. (R)	Robert Yates Racing	Ford
29	Jeff Green	Diamond Ridge Motorsports	Chevrolet
30	Derrike Cope	Bahari Racing	Pontiac
31	Morgan Shepherd	Richard Childress Racing	Chevrolet
33	Ken Schrader	Andy Petree Racing	Chevrolet
35	Todd Bodine	ISM Racing	Pontiac
36	Ernie Irvan	MB2 Motorsports	Pontiac
40	Sterling Marlin	Team SABCO	Chevrolet
41	Steve Grissom	Larry Hedrick Motorsports	Chevrolet
42	Joe Nemechek	Team SABCO	Chevrolet
43	John Andretti	Petty Enterprises	Pontiac
44	Kyle Petty	Petty Enterprises	Pontiac
46	Wally Dallenbach Jr.	Team SABCO	Chevrolet
47	Billy Standridge	Standridge Motorsports	Ford
50	Randy LaJoie	Hendrick Motorsports	Chevrolet
60	Matt Kenseth	Roush Racing	Ford
71	Dave Marcis	Marcis Auto Racing	Chevrolet
75	Rick Mast	Butch Mock Motorsports	Ford
77	Robert Pressley	Jasper Motorsports	Ford
78	Gary Bradberry	Triad Motorsports	Ford
81	Kenny Wallace	FILMAR Racing	Ford
85	Bob Strait	Mansion Motorsports	Chevrolet
88	Dale Jarrett	Robert Yates Racing	Ford
89	Dennis Setzer	Elliott-Marino Racing	Ford
90	Dick Trickle	Donlavey Racing	Ford
91	Kevin Lepage (R)	LJ Racing	Chevrolet
94	Bill Elliott	Elliott-Marino Racing	Ford
96	David Green	American Equipment Racing	Chevrolet
97	Chad Little	Roush Racing	Ford
98	Greg Sacks	Cale Yarborough Motorsports	Ford
99	Jeff Burton	Roush Racing	Ford

== Practice ==
=== First practice ===
The first practice session was held on the afternoon of Friday, April 24. Bobby Labonte, driving for Joe Gibbs Racing, would set the fastest time in the session, with a lap of 49.136 and an average speed of 194.888 miles per hour (313.642 km/h).

Pos.	#	Driver	Team	Make	Time	Speed
1	18	Bobby Labonte	Joe Gibbs Racing	Pontiac	49.136	194.888
2	5	Terry Labonte	Hendrick Motorsports	Chevrolet	49.189	194.678
3	3	Dale Earnhardt	Richard Childress Racing	Chevrolet	49.308	194.208
Full first practice results

=== Second practice ===
The second practice session was held on the morning of Saturday, April 25. Derrike Cope, driving for Bahari Racing, would set the fastest time in the session, with a lap of 49.156 and an average speed of 194.808 miles per hour (313.513 km/h).

Pos.	#	Driver	Team	Make	Time	Speed
1	30	Derrike Cope	Bahari Racing	Pontiac	49.156	194.808
2	44	Kyle Petty	Petty Enterprises	Pontiac	49.243	194.464
3	13	Jerry Nadeau (R)	Elliott-Marino Racing	Ford	49.246	194.452
Full second practice results

=== Final practice ===
The final practice session, sometimes referred to as Happy Hour, was held on the afternoon of Saturday, April 25. Kenny Irwin Jr., driving for Robert Yates Racing, would set the fastest time in the session, with a lap of 49.048 and an average speed of 195.237 miles per hour (314.203 km/h).

Pos.	#	Driver	Team	Make	Time	Speed
1	28	Kenny Irwin Jr. (R)	Robert Yates Racing	Ford	49.048	195.237
2	24	Jeff Gordon	Hendrick Motorsports	Chevrolet	49.089	195.074
3	5	Terry Labonte	Hendrick Motorsports	Chevrolet	49.112	194.983
Full Happy Hour practice results

== Qualifying ==
Qualifying was split into two rounds. The first round was held on Friday, April 24, at 3:00 PM CST. Each driver would have one lap to set a time. During the first round, the top 25 drivers in the round would be guaranteed a starting spot in the race. If a driver was not able to guarantee a spot in the first round, they had the option to scrub their time from the first round and try and run a faster lap time in a second round qualifying run, held on Saturday, April 24, at 5:00 PM EST. As with the first round, each driver would have one lap to set a time. On January 24, 1998, NASCAR would announce that the amount of provisionals given would be increased from last season. Positions 26-36 would be decided on time, while positions 37-43 would be based on provisionals. Six spots are awarded by the use of provisionals based on owner's points. The seventh is awarded to a past champion who has not otherwise qualified for the race. If no past champion needs the provisional, the next team in the owner points will be awarded a provisional.

Bobby Labonte, driving for Joe Gibbs Racing, would win the pole, setting a time of 48.925 and an average speed of 195.728 miles per hour (314.994 km/h).

Nine drivers would fail to qualify: Todd Bodine, Jeff Green, Hut Stricklin, Matt Kenseth, Rich Bickle, Dan Pardus, Gary Bradberry, Geoff Bodine, and Bob Strait.

=== Full qualifying results ===
Pos.	#	Driver	Team	Make	Time	Speed
1	18	Bobby Labonte	Joe Gibbs Racing	Pontiac	48.925	195.728
2	3	Dale Earnhardt	Richard Childress Racing	Chevrolet	49.059	195.194
3	5	Terry Labonte	Hendrick Motorsports	Chevrolet	49.246	194.452
4	33	Ken Schrader	Andy Petree Racing	Chevrolet	49.259	194.401
5	31	Morgan Shepherd	Richard Childress Racing	Chevrolet	49.330	194.121
6	24	Jeff Gordon	Hendrick Motorsports	Chevrolet	49.404	193.830
7	30	Derrike Cope	Bahari Racing	Pontiac	49.430	193.729
8	9	Lake Speed	Melling Racing	Ford	49.457	193.623
9	88	Dale Jarrett	Robert Yates Racing	Ford	49.492	193.486
10	50	Randy LaJoie	Hendrick Motorsports	Chevrolet	49.590	193.103
11	42	Joe Nemechek	Team SABCO	Chevrolet	49.614	193.010
12	13	Jerry Nadeau (R)	Elliott-Marino Racing	Ford	49.622	192.979
13	10	Ricky Rudd	Rudd Performance Motorsports	Ford	49.641	192.905
14	40	Sterling Marlin	Team SABCO	Chevrolet	49.688	192.723
15	43	John Andretti	Petty Enterprises	Pontiac	49.767	192.417
16	90	Dick Trickle	Donlavey Racing	Ford	49.773	192.393
17	94	Bill Elliott	Elliott-Marino Racing	Ford	49.781	192.363
18	99	Jeff Burton	Roush Racing	Ford	49.815	192.231
19	36	Ernie Irvan	MB2 Motorsports	Pontiac	49.819	192.216
20	22	Ward Burton	Bill Davis Racing	Pontiac	49.929	191.792
21	46	Wally Dallenbach Jr.	Team SABCO	Chevrolet	49.946	191.727
22	23	Jimmy Spencer	Travis Carter Enterprises	Ford	49.951	191.708
23	2	Rusty Wallace	Penske-Kranefuss Racing	Ford	49.960	191.673
24	1	Darrell Waltrip	Dale Earnhardt, Inc.	Chevrolet	49.978	191.604
25	28	Kenny Irwin Jr. (R)	Robert Yates Racing	Ford	49.985	191.577
26	89	Dennis Setzer	Elliott-Marino Racing	Ford	49.789	192.332
27	96	David Green	American Equipment Racing	Chevrolet	49.811	192.247
28	71	Dave Marcis	Marcis Auto Racing	Chevrolet	49.915	191.846
29	91	Kevin Lepage (R)	LJ Racing	Chevrolet	49.942	191.742
30	4	Bobby Hamilton	Morgan–McClure Motorsports	Chevrolet	49.990	191.558
31	47	Billy Standridge	Standridge Motorsports	Ford	50.025	191.424
32	44	Kyle Petty	Petty Enterprises	Pontiac	50.032	191.398
33	21	Michael Waltrip	Wood Brothers Racing	Ford	50.051	191.325
34	97	Chad Little	Roush Racing	Ford	50.079	191.218
35	81	Kenny Wallace	FILMAR Racing	Ford	50.091	191.172
36	75	Rick Mast	Butch Mock Motorsports	Ford	50.098	191.145
Provisionals
37	12	Jeremy Mayfield	Penske-Kranefuss Racing	Ford	-*	-*
38	6	Mark Martin	Roush Racing	Ford	-*	-*
39	26	Johnny Benson Jr.	Roush Racing	Ford	-*	-*
40	16	Ted Musgrave	Roush Racing	Ford	-*	-*
41	11	Brett Bodine	Brett Bodine Racing	Ford	-*	-*
42	41	Steve Grissom	Larry Hedrick Motorsports	Chevrolet	-*	-*
43	77	Robert Pressley	Jasper Motorsports	Ford	-*	-*
Failed to qualify
44	35	Todd Bodine	ISM Racing	Pontiac	50.222	190.673
45	29	Jeff Green	Diamond Ridge Motorsports	Chevrolet	50.237	190.616
46	8	Hut Stricklin	Stavola Brothers Racing	Chevrolet	50.260	190.529
47	60	Matt Kenseth	Roush Racing	Ford	50.278	190.461
48	98	Rich Bickle	Cale Yarborough Motorsports	Ford	50.340	190.226
49	07	Dan Pardus	Midwest Transit Racing	Chevrolet	50.352	190.181
50	78	Gary Bradberry	Triad Motorsports	Ford	50.549	189.440
51	7	Geoff Bodine	Mattei Motorsports	Ford	50.655	189.044
52	85	Bob Strait	Mansion Motorsports	Chevrolet	-	-
Official qualifying results

== Race results ==
Fin	St	#	Driver	Team	Make	Laps	Led	Status	Pts	Winnings
1	1	18	Bobby Labonte	Joe Gibbs Racing	Pontiac	188	60	running	180	$141,870
2	22	23	Jimmy Spencer	Travis Carter Enterprises	Ford	188	0	running	170	$97,920
3	9	88	Dale Jarrett	Robert Yates Racing	Ford	188	8	running	170	$82,370
4	3	5	Terry Labonte	Hendrick Motorsports	Chevrolet	188	88	running	170	$85,520
5	6	24	Jeff Gordon	Hendrick Motorsports	Chevrolet	188	3	running	160	$74,490
6	19	36	Ernie Irvan	MB2 Motorsports	Pontiac	188	0	running	150	$52,080
7	35	81	Kenny Wallace	FILMAR Racing	Ford	188	0	running	146	$45,830
8	20	22	Ward Burton	Bill Davis Racing	Pontiac	188	0	running	142	$46,630
9	14	40	Sterling Marlin	Team SABCO	Chevrolet	188	13	running	143	$37,230
10	10	50	Randy LaJoie	Hendrick Motorsports	Chevrolet	188	0	running	134	$48,580
11	41	11	Brett Bodine	Brett Bodine Racing	Ford	188	1	running	135	$44,675
12	23	2	Rusty Wallace	Penske-Kranefuss Racing	Ford	188	0	running	127	$44,295
13	37	12	Jeremy Mayfield	Penske-Kranefuss Racing	Ford	188	0	running	124	$39,615
14	29	91	Kevin Lepage (R)	LJ Racing	Chevrolet	187	0	running	121	$30,785
15	24	1	Darrell Waltrip	Dale Earnhardt, Inc.	Chevrolet	187	0	running	118	$28,555
16	42	41	Steve Grissom	Larry Hedrick Motorsports	Chevrolet	187	0	running	115	$39,065
17	27	96	David Green	American Equipment Racing	Chevrolet	187	0	running	112	$30,400
18	36	75	Rick Mast	Butch Mock Motorsports	Ford	186	0	running	109	$29,710
19	26	89	Dennis Setzer	Elliott-Marino Racing	Ford	186	0	running	106	$26,620
20	16	90	Dick Trickle	Donlavey Racing	Ford	185	0	running	103	$37,810
21	33	21	Michael Waltrip	Wood Brothers Racing	Ford	184	3	running	105	$36,570
22	7	30	Derrike Cope	Bahari Racing	Pontiac	182	0	running	97	$35,300
23	38	6	Mark Martin	Roush Racing	Ford	180	0	running	94	$41,990
24	13	10	Ricky Rudd	Rudd Performance Motorsports	Ford	179	0	running	91	$40,985
25	8	9	Lake Speed	Melling Racing	Ford	178	0	running	88	$34,580
26	21	46	Wally Dallenbach Jr.	Team SABCO	Chevrolet	176	0	running	85	$27,300
27	28	71	Dave Marcis	Marcis Auto Racing	Chevrolet	176	0	running	82	$24,045
28	31	47	Billy Standridge	Standridge Motorsports	Ford	172	0	running	79	$23,890
29	4	33	Ken Schrader	Andy Petree Racing	Chevrolet	157	0	crash	76	$33,835
30	30	4	Bobby Hamilton	Morgan–McClure Motorsports	Chevrolet	153	0	handling	73	$38,580
31	43	77	Robert Pressley	Jasper Motorsports	Ford	152	0	running	70	$33,725
32	11	42	Joe Nemechek	Team SABCO	Chevrolet	150	0	crash	67	$32,770
33	15	43	John Andretti	Petty Enterprises	Pontiac	150	0	crash	64	$38,140
34	34	97	Chad Little	Roush Racing	Ford	145	0	crash	61	$23,210
35	5	31	Morgan Shepherd	Richard Childress Racing	Chevrolet	145	0	crash	58	$22,955
36	2	3	Dale Earnhardt	Richard Childress Racing	Chevrolet	144	10	crash	60	$38,250
37	12	13	Jerry Nadeau (R)	Elliott-Marino Racing	Ford	144	0	crash	52	$22,586
38	32	44	Kyle Petty	Petty Enterprises	Pontiac	142	0	crash	49	$29,350
39	17	94	Bill Elliott	Elliott-Marino Racing	Ford	141	2	crash	51	$31,850
40	25	28	Kenny Irwin Jr. (R)	Robert Yates Racing	Ford	128	0	engine	43	$37,250
41	39	26	Johnny Benson Jr.	Roush Racing	Ford	127	0	engine	40	$29,050
42	40	16	Ted Musgrave	Roush Racing	Ford	110	0	engine	37	$28,950
43	18	99	Jeff Burton	Roush Racing	Ford	51	0	engine	34	$38,450
Official race results

== Media ==
=== Television ===
The race was moved from ESPN as it would air the fall race at Talladega. It aired live on ABC in the United States. Bob Jenkins and 1973 Cup Series champion Benny Parsons called the race from the broadcast booth. Jerry Punch, Bill Weber and Jack Arute handled pit road for the television side.

ABC
Booth announcers		Pit reporters
Lap-by-lap	Color-commentators	Pit reporters
Bob Jenkins	Benny Parsons	Jerry Punch; Bill Weber; Jack Arute

Previous race: 1998 Goody's Headache Powder 500 (Martinsville)	NASCAR Winston Cup Series; 1998 season	Next race: 1998 California 500
