= 2012 Aaron's 312 =

NASCAR race at Talladega Superspeedway

Race details
- Map of Speedway
- Date: May 5, 2012
- Official name: 2012 Aaron's 312
- Location: Talladega Superspeedway in Lincoln, Alabama
- Course: Permanent racing facility
- Course length: 2.66 miles (4.28 km)
- Distance: 122 laps, 324.52 mi (522.264 km)
- Scheduled distance: 117 laps, 311.2 mi (500.83 km)
- Weather: Sunny
- Average speed: 136.258 mph (219.286 km/h)
- Attendance: 66,000

Pole position
Driver	Elliott Sadler	Richard Childress Racing
- Time: no qualifying

Most laps led
Driver	Kyle Busch	Kyle Busch Motorsports
- Laps: 36

Winner
No. 18	Joey Logano	Joe Gibbs Racing

Television in the United States
- Network: ESPN/ABC
- Announcers: Allen Bestwick, Dale Jarrett, Andy Petree

The 2012 Aaron's 312 was the 8th race of the 2012 NASCAR Nationwide Series and the 21st holding of this event. The race was held at Talladega Superspeedway in Lincoln, Alabama. In the end, Joey Logano won the race in a close finish with his Cup Series teammate Kyle Busch as Logano beat Busch by .034 seconds. But this race became notable for it being a wreckfest and for a terrible crash by Eric McClure that left McClure with a concussion.

== Background ==
Talladega Superspeedway, the race track where the race was held.

The track, Talladega Superspeedway, is one of six superspeedways to hold NASCAR races, the others being Daytona International Speedway, Auto Club Speedway, Indianapolis Motor Speedway, Pocono Raceway and Michigan International Speedway. The standard track at the speedway is a four-turn superspeedway that is 2.66 miles (4.28 km) long. The track's turns are banked at thirty-three degrees, while the front stretch, the location of the finish line, is banked at 16.5 degrees. The back stretch has a two-degree banking. Talladega Superspeedway can seat up to 143,231 people.

=== Entry list ===
- (R) denotes rookie driver
- (i) denotes driver who is ineligible for series driver points

#	Driver	Team	Make
01	Mike Wallace	JD Motorsports	Chevrolet
1	Kurt Busch (i)	Phoenix Racing	Chevrolet
2	Elliott Sadler	Richard Childress Racing	Chevrolet
3	Austin Dillon (R)	Richard Childress Racing	Chevrolet
4	Danny Efland	JD Motorsports	Chevrolet
5	Dale Earnhardt Jr. (i)	JR Motorsports	Chevrolet
6	Ricky Stenhouse Jr.	Roush Fenway Racing	Ford
7	Danica Patrick	JR Motorsports	Chevrolet
08	Tim Andrews	Randy Hill Racing	Ford
10	Jeff Green	TriStar Motorsports	Toyota
11	Brian Scott	Joe Gibbs Racing	Toyota
12	Sam Hornish Jr.	Penske Racing	Dodge
14	Eric McClure	TriStar Motorsports	Toyota
15	Jeffery Earnhardt	Rick Ware Racing	Ford
18	Joey Logano (i)	Joe Gibbs Racing	Toyota
19	Tayler Malsam	TriStar Motorsports	Toyota
20	Ryan Truex	Joe Gibbs Racing	Toyota
22	Brad Keselowski (i)	Penske Racing	Dodge
23	Robert Richardson Jr.	R3 Motorsports	Chevrolet
24	John Wes Townley (i)	RAB Racing	Toyota
30	James Buescher (i)	Turner Motorsports	Chevrolet
31	Justin Allgaier	Turner Motorsports	Chevrolet
33	Kevin Harvick (i)	Richard Childress Racing	Chevrolet
38	Brad Sweet (R)	Turner Motorsports	Chevrolet
39	Josh Richards	Go Green Racing	Ford
40	Erik Darnell	The Motorsports Group	Chevrolet
41	Timmy Hill	Rick Ware Racing	Ford
42	Josh Wise (i)	The Motorsports Group	Chevrolet
43	Michael Annett	Richard Petty Motorsports	Ford
44	Mike Bliss	TriStar Motorsports	Toyota
46	Chase Miller	The Motorsports Group	Chevrolet
47	Scott Speed (i)	The Motorsports Group	Chevrolet
50	T. J. Bell	MAKE Motorsports	Chevrolet
51	Jeremy Clements	Jeremy Clements Racing	Chevrolet
52	Kevin Lepage	Hamilton Means Racing	Chevrolet
54	Kyle Busch	Kyle Busch Motorsports	Toyota
70	Johanna Long (R)	ML Motorsports	Chevrolet
74	Mike Harmon	Mike Harmon Racing	Chevrolet
75	Blake Koch	Rick Ware Racing	Chevrolet
81	Jason Bowles (R)	MacDonald Motorsports	Toyota
87	Joe Nemechek	NEMCO Motorsports	Toyota
88	Cole Whitt (R)	JR Motorsports	Chevrolet
89	Morgan Shepherd	Shepherd Racing Ventures	Chevrolet
99	Kenny Wallace	RAB Racing	Toyota
Official Entry List

== Qualifying ==
Elliott Sadler won the pole after qualifying was rained out.

Grid	No.	Driver	Team	Manufacturer
1	2	Elliott Sadler	Richard Childress Racing	Chevrolet
2	6	Ricky Stenhouse Jr.	Roush Fenway Racing	Ford
3	33	Kevin Harvick (i)	Richard Childress Racing	Chevrolet
4	18	Joey Logano (i)	Joe Gibbs Racing	Toyota
5	3	Austin Dillon (R)	Richard Childress Racing	Chevrolet
6	38	Brad Sweet (R)	Turner Motorsports	Chevrolet
7	30	James Buescher (i)	Turner Motorsports	Chevrolet
8	12	Sam Hornish Jr.	Penske Racing	Dodge
9	22	Brad Keselowski (i)	Penske Racing	Dodge
10	43	Michael Annett	Richard Petty Motorsports	Ford
11	88	Cole Whitt (R)	JR Motorsports	Chevrolet
12	54	Kyle Busch (i)	Kyle Busch Motorsports	Toyota
13	31	Justin Allgaier	Turner Motorsports	Chevrolet
14	19	Tayler Malsam	TriStar Motorsports	Toyota
15	44	Mike Bliss	TriStar Motorsports	Toyota
16	87	Joe Nemechek	NEMCO Motorsports	Toyota
17	7	Danica Patrick	JR Motorsports	Chevrolet
18	20	Ryan Truex	Joe Gibbs Racing	Toyota
19	01	Mike Wallace	JD Motorsports	Chevrolet
20	99	Kenny Wallace	RAB Racing	Toyota
21	51	Jeremy Clements	Jeremy Clements Racing	Chevrolet
22	11	Brian Scott	Joe Gibbs Racing	Toyota
23	4	Danny Efland	JD Motorsports	Chevrolet
24	70	Johanna Long (R)	ML Motorsports	Chevrolet
25	81	Jason Bowels (R)	MacDonald Motorsports	Toyota
26	24	John Wes Townley (i)	RAB Racing	Toyota
27	40	Erik Darnell	The Motorsports Group	Chevrolet
28	41	Timmy Hill	Rick Ware Racing	Ford
29	14	Eric McClure	TriStar Motorsports	Toyota
30	08	Tim Andrews	Randy Hill Racing	Ford
31	1	Kurt Busch (i)	Phoenix Racing	Chevrolet
32	10	Jeff Green	TriStar Motorsports	Toyota
33	5	Dale Earnhardt Jr. (i)	JR Motorsports	Chevrolet
34	23	Robert Richardson Jr.	R3 Motorsports	Chevrolet
35	50	T. J. Bell*	MAKE Motorsports	Chevrolet
36	39	Josh Richards	Go Green Racing	Ford
37	52	Kevin Lepage	Hamilton Means Racing	Chevrolet
38	89	Morgan Shepherd	Shepherd Racing Ventures	Chevrolet
39	46	Chase Miller	The Motorsports Group	Chevrolet
40	42	Josh Wise (i)	The Motorsports Group	Chevrolet
41	47	Scott Speed (i)	The Motorsports Group	Chevrolet
42	74	Mike Harmon	Mike Harmon Racing	Chevrolet
43	15	Jeffery Earnhardt	Rick Ware Racing	Ford
Failed to Qualify, driver changes, or withdrew
44	75	Blake Koch	Rick Ware Racing	Chevrolet
Official Qualifying results

* - T. J. Bell had to start at the rear of the field due to adjustments after impound.

== Race ==
Pole sitter Elliott Sadler led the first lap of the race. On lap 5, Sadler lost the lead to Kevin Harvick when Sadler and his drafting partner Joey Logano switched positions. On lap 6, Austin Dillon took the lead. On lap 8, James Buescher took the lead from Dillon. Kurt Busch took the lead on lap 14 followed by Joey Logano on lap 15 and Elliott Sadler on lap 16. Kyle Busch took the lead on lap 18 but lost it on the next lap to James Buescher. On lap 21, the first caution flew when Johanna Long's engine blew and she laid fluid on the racetrack. Kyle Busch won the race off of pit road which made him the race leader. On the restart on lap 26, Dale Earnhardt Jr. took the lead from Kyle Busch with a push by Joe Nemechek. Earnhardt lost the lead to Logano on the next lap of the race. The second caution flew on lap 29 for a 5 car crash on the frontstretch. It started when Brian Scott got turned by Kurt Busch in the tri-oval and Scott turned into Jason Bowels and collected Kurt Busch, Josh Richards, and Morgan Shepherd. Some drivers pitted while others stayed out and Dale Earnhardt Jr. was the leader on the restart on lap 35. But Jr. quickly lost the lead to Logano as Logano pitted under caution. Logano lost the lead to Mike Bliss on lap 42 but Logano got it back on lap 44. Dale Earnhardt Jr. took the lead on lap 47 from Logano. Joe Nemechek took the lead from Jr. on lap 52 followed by Mike Wallace on the next lap but Jr. got it back on lap 54. On lap 63, the third caution flew for a 3 car crash on the frontstretch involving Eric McClure, John Wes Townley, and Brad Sweet. Austin Dillon won the race off of pit road making him the race leader. Dillon got passed by Cole Whitt on the restart as Whitt had a push by his boss at JR Motorsports in Dale Earnhardt Jr. Kenny Wallace took the lead on lap 71 followed by Dale Earnhardt Jr. on the next lap. Elliott Sadler took the lead on lap 73 of the race. Ryan Truex took the lead with 43 laps to go followed by Dale Earnhardt Jr. the next lap. With 40 laps to go, Danica Patrick took the lead from Jr. but Jr. took it back on the next lap. With 37 laps to go, Kevin Harvick took the lead from Dale Earnhardt Jr. With 36 laps to go, the fourth caution flew when Josh Richards cut a tire and spun in turn 2. During that Caution period, Timmy Hill was taken out of his car and replaced by Blake Koch in his #41 car. Hill had not been feeling well for the last day so he was taken out during the caution period. Kevin Harvick won the race off of pit road which made him the race leader with 30 laps to go. On the restart, Joey Logano took the lead from Harvick.

=== Final Laps ===
With 29 laps to go, Kyle Busch took the lead from Joey Logano. Busch was also able to hold off the pack behind him and never lost the lead. It looked like Busch was going to win the race depending on how the last few laps went. Unfortunately for Busch, with 9 laps to go the 5th caution flew when Mike Bliss spun in turn 3. The caution turned things around as cars were now all bunched back together and all of them were going to race hard for positions. The race restarted with 4 laps to go and Busch kept his lead with a push by Joe Nemechek. Unfourtantley again for Busch, the 6th caution flew on the same lap when Mike Wallace and Danny Efland crashed in turn 4. The wreck would set up 3 attempts of a green-white-checker finish.

On the restart, Nemechek got out in front by half a car length but Busch was not giving up as Busch was getting pushed by Brad Keselowski and Nemechek was getting pushed by Kevin Harvick. Michael Annett tried to peak through the middle down the backstretch with a push by Joey Logano. Annett made contact with Keselowski then Annett turned down and into Kevin Harvick turning Harvick around collecting Keselowski. Keselowski spun down and collected Annett and Austin Dillon. Behind them, Eric McClure checked up to avoid the wreck but got hit in the right front by Kurt Busch and McClure's car turned left into Jeffery Earnhardt and the two went spinning towards the inside wall. McClure's car spun down the racetrack and pounded the inside wall head on at nearly full speed which made his car bounce. The wreck collected a total of 11 cars as the cars involved were Austin Dillon, Danica Patrick, Eric McClure, Jeffery Earnhardt, Joey Logano, Tayler Malsam, Brad Keselowski, Robert Richardson Jr., Kevin Harvick, Blake Koch, and Michael Annett. Eric McClure was still stuck inside his car and rescue crews began to surround his car attempting to get him out as the race was red flagged. It took the crews about 10 minutes to get McClure out of his car. McClure was feared to be unconscious when McClure wasn't responding to his crew chief and spotter after the wreck. But NASCAR officials reported that McClure was talking with the crews that were assisting him which led McClure's crew to believe the impact ended up snapping one of the radio wires apart in the impact. The crews ended up cutting the rollcage to give them a better chance to assist him. McClure was carried on a stretcher from his car to an ambulance and got flown to University of Alabama Hospital in Birmingham, Alabama for further evaluation. McClure had suffered a concussion and internal bruises. But thankfully, McClure survived the crash. McClure missed the next 4 races where he was replaced by Jeff Green. The race was red flagged for over 15 minutes for crews attempting to get McClure out of his car and to repair the SAFER barrier where McClure hit. The race restarted. On the second attempt, Busch kept his lead over Logano. Behind them down the backstretch, Sam Hornish Jr. got hooked by Justin Allgaier and turned into Joe Nemechek. But everyone saved it and no caution was thrown. 4 cars broke away in tandems with Busch getting pushed by Joey Logano, and behind them was Cole Whitt getting pushed by Ricky Stenhouse Jr. On the final lap, Whitt and Stenhouse attempted to gain ground on Busch and Logano but could not do it. In the tri-oval, Logano attempted to pull to the outside of Busch and got side by side with him. Logano beat Busch by .034 seconds to take home the win. Coming to the checkered, Danica Patrick came down into Sam Hornish Jr. and Hornish and Patrick went into the outside wall. After they took the checkered, Patrick turned Hornish into the outside wall in turn 1 as a show of displeasure of how she was raced on the final lap. Kyle Busch, Ricky Stenhouse Jr., Cole Whitt, and Dale Earnhardt Jr. rounded out the top 5 while Kurt Busch, James Buescher, Justin Allgaier, Kenny Wallace, and Elliott Sadler rounded out the top 10.

== Race results ==
Pos	Car	Driver	Team	Manufacturer	Laps Run	Laps Led	Status	Points
1	18	Joey Logano (i)	Joe Gibbs Racing	Toyota	122	17	running	0
2	54	Kyle Busch (i)	Kyle Busch Motorsports	Toyota	122	36	running	0
3	6	Ricky Stenhouse Jr.	Roush Fenway Racing	Ford	122	1	running	42
4	88	Cole Whitt (R)	JR Motorsports	Chevrolet	122	3	running	41
5	5	Dale Earnhardt Jr. (i)	JR Motorsports	Chevrolet	122	25	running	0
6	1	Kurt Busch (i)	Phoenix Racing	Chevrolet	122	1	running	0
7	30	James Buescher (i)	Turner Motorsports	Chevrolet	122	9	running	0
8	31	Justin Allgaier	Turner Motorsports	Chevrolet	122	0	running	36
9	99	Kenny Wallace	RAB Racing	Toyota	122	1	running	36
10	2	Elliott Sadler	Richard Childress Racing	Chevrolet	122	8	running	35
11	20	Ryan Truex	Joe Gibbs Racing	Toyota	122	1	running	34
12	12	Sam Hornish Jr.	Penske Racing	Dodge	122	2	running	33
13	7	Danica Patrick	JR Motorsports	Chevrolet	122	1	running	32
14	40	Erik Darnell	The Motorsports Group	Chevrolet	122	0	running	30
15	24	John Wes Townley (i)	RAB Racing	Toyota	122	0	running	0
16	4	Danny Efland	JD Motorsports	Chevrolet	122	0	running	28
17	3	Austin Dillon (R)	Richard Childress Racing	Chevrolet	122	4	running	28
18	44	Mike Bliss	TriStar Motorsports	Toyota	122	2	running	27
19	87	Joe Nemechek	NEMCO Motorsports	Toyota	122	1	running	26
20	22	Brad Keselowski (i)	Penske Racing	Dodge	121	0	running	0
21	41	Timmy Hill	Rick Ware Racing	Ford	117	0	running	23
22	33	Kevin Harvick (i)	Richard Childress Racing	Chevrolet	116	8	crash	0
23	43	Michael Annett	Richard Petty Motorsports	Ford	116	0	crash	21
24	19	Tayler Malsam	TriStar Motorsports	Toyota	116	0	crash	20
25	15	Jeffery Earnhardt	Rick Ware Racing	Ford	116	0	crash	19
26	23	Robert Richardson Jr.	R3 Motorsports	Chevrolet	116	0	crash	18
27	14	Eric McClure	TriStar Motorsports	Toyota	116	0	crash	17
28	01	Mike Wallace	JD Motorsports	Chevrolet	113	1	crash	17
29	51	Jeremy Clements	Jeremy Clements Racing	Chevrolet	113	0	running	15
30	39	Josh Richards	Go Green Racing	Ford	85	0	fuel pump	14
31	50	T. J. Bell	MAKE Motorsports	Chevrolet	82	0	running	13
32	08	Tim Andrews	Randy Hill Racing	Ford	64	1	overheating	13
33	38	Brad Sweet (R)	Turner Motorsports	Chevrolet	62	0	crash	11
34	81	Jason Bowels (R)	MacDonald Motorsports	Toyota	32	0	crash	10
35	89	Morgan Shepherd	Shepherd Racing Ventures	Chevrolet	29	0	crash	9
36	11	Brian Scott	Joe Gibbs Racing	Toyota	29	0	crash	8
37	70	Johanna Long (R)	ML Motorsports	Chevrolet	18	0	overheating	7
38	74	Mike Harmon	Mike Harmon Racing	Chevrolet	12	0	vibration	6
39	10	Jeff Green	TriStar Motorsports	Toyota	9	0	vibration	5
40	42	Josh Wise (i)	The Motorsports Group	Chevrolet	9	0	electrical	0
41	46	Chase Miller	The Motorsports Group	Chevrolet	8	0	vibration	3
42	47	Scott Speed (i)	The Motorsports Group	Chevrolet	2	0	ignition	0
43	52	Kevin Lepage	Hamilton Means Motorsports	Chevrolet	1	0	clutch	1
Official Race results

Previous race: 2012 Virginia 529 College Savings 250	NASCAR Nationwide Series; 2012 season	Next race: 2012 VFW Sport Clips Help a Hero 200
