= 2005 Coca-Cola 600 =

Race details
- Race 12 of 36 in the 2005 NASCAR Nextel Cup Series
- 2005 Coca-Cola 600 program cover, with artwork from NASCAR artist Sam Bass. The painting is called "Bottle Rockets!"
- Date: May 29, 2005
- Location: Lowe's Motor Speedway, Concord, North Carolina
- Course: Permanent racing facility
- Course length: 1.5 miles (2.4 km)
- Distance: 400 laps, 600 mi (965.606 km)
- Weather: Temperatures reaching up to 80.6 °F (27.0 °C); wind speeds up to 8.9 miles per hour (14.3 km/h)
- Average speed: 114.698 mph (184.589 km/h)

Pole position
Driver	Ryan Newman	Penske Racing
- Time: 27.981 seconds

Most laps led
Driver	Brian Vickers	Hendrick Motorsports
- Laps: 98

Winner
No. 48	Jimmie Johnson	Hendrick Motorsports

Television in the United States
- Network: Fox
- Announcers: Mike Joy, Darrell Waltrip, Larry McReynolds
- Nielsen ratings: 6.1

The 2005 Coca-Cola 600, the 46th running of the race, was a NASCAR Nextel Cup Series race held on May 29, 2005, at Lowe's Motor Speedway in Concord, North Carolina. The race was the twelfth of the 2005 NASCAR Nextel Cup Series season. The pole position was won by Penske Racing's Ryan Newman, while the race was won by Jimmie Johnson of Hendrick Motorsports in a fantastic finish against Bobby Labonte. The race featured the most caution flags in Cup history at 22 cautions for 103 laps, as well as the most lap leaders (21) in track history.

== Background ==
Lowe's Motor Speedway, the track where the race was held.

Lowe's Motor Speedway is a motorsports complex located in Concord, North Carolina, United States 13 miles from Charlotte, North Carolina. The complex features a 1.5 miles (2.4 km) quad oval track that hosts NASCAR racing including the prestigious Coca-Cola 600 on Memorial Day weekend and the NEXTEL All-Star Challenge, as well as the UAW-GM Quality 500. The speedway was built in 1959 by Bruton Smith and is considered the home track for NASCAR with many race teams located in the Charlotte area. The track is owned and operated by Speedway Motorsports Inc. (SMI) with Marcus G. Smith (son of Bruton Smith) as track president.

== Entry list ==
No.	Driver	Team	Make
00	Carl Long	McGlynn Racing	Chevrolet
0	Mike Bliss	Haas CNC Racing	Chevrolet
01	Joe Nemechek	MB2 Motorsports	Chevrolet
1	Martin Truex Jr.	Dale Earnhardt, Inc.	Chevrolet
2	Rusty Wallace	Penske Racing South	Dodge
4	Mike Wallace	Morgan-McClure Motorsports	Chevrolet
5	Kyle Busch	Hendrick Motorsports	Chevrolet
6	Mark Martin	Roush Racing	Ford
07	Dave Blaney	Richard Childress Racing	Chevrolet
7	Robby Gordon	Robby Gordon Motorsports	Chevrolet
8	Dale Earnhardt Jr.	Dale Earnhardt, Inc.	Chevrolet
09	Johnny Sauter	Phoenix Racing	Dodge
9	Kasey Kahne	Evernham Motorsports	Dodge
10	Scott Riggs	MBV Motorsports	Chevrolet
11	Jason Leffler	Joe Gibbs Racing	Chevrolet
12	Ryan Newman	Penske Racing South	Dodge
13	Greg Sacks	Sacks Motorsports	Dodge
15	Michael Waltrip	Dale Earnhardt, Inc.	Chevrolet
16	Greg Biffle	Roush Racing	Ford
17	Matt Kenseth	Roush Racing	Ford
18	Bobby Labonte	Joe Gibbs Racing	Chevrolet
19	Jeremy Mayfield	Evernham Motorsports	Dodge
20	Tony Stewart	Joe Gibbs Racing	Chevrolet
21	Ricky Rudd	Wood Brothers Racing	Ford
22	Scott Wimmer	Bill Davis Racing	Dodge
23	Mike Skinner	Bill Davis Racing	Dodge
24	Jeff Gordon	Hendrick Motorsports	Chevrolet
25	Brian Vickers	Petty Enterprises	Chevrolet
27	Kirk Shelmerdine	Kirk Shelmerdine Racing	Ford
29	Kevin Harvick	Richard Childress Racing	Chevrolet
31	Jeff Burton	Richard Childress Racing	Chevrolet
32	Bobby Hamilton Jr.	PPI Motorsports	Chevrolet
34	Jeff Fuller	Mach 1 Motorsports	Chevrolet
36	Boris Said	MB Sutton Motorsports	Chevrolet
37	Kevin Lepage	John Carter Racing	Dodge
38	Elliott Sadler	Yates Racing	Ford
40	Sterling Marlin	Chip Ganassi Racing	Dodge
41	Casey Mears	Chip Ganassi Racing	Dodge
42	Jamie McMurray	Chip Ganassi Racing	Dodge
43	Jeff Green	Petty Enterprises	Dodge
44	Terry Labonte	Hendrick Motorsports	Chevrolet
45	Kyle Petty	Petty Enterprises	Dodge
48	Jimmie Johnson	Hendrick Motorsports	Chevrolet
49	Ken Schrader	BAM Racing	Dodge
50	Jimmy Spencer	Arnold Motorsports	Dodge
66	Hermie Sadler	Peak Fitness Racing	Ford
75	Mike Garvey	Zero Four Motorsports	Dodge
77	Travis Kvapil	Penske-Jasper Racing	Dodge
88	Dale Jarrett	Yates Racing	Ford
91	Bill Elliott	Evernham Motorsports	Dodge
92	Tony Raines	Front Row Motorsports	Chevrolet
97	Kurt Busch	Roush Racing	Ford
99	Carl Edwards	Roush Racing	Ford

== Qualifying ==
53 drivers attempted to qualify for the race, the most since the 2005 Daytona 500, which featured 57 cars attempting to make the field. The pole position was won by Ryan Newman, his 18th career pole, after recording a lap time of 27.981 seconds and speed of 192.988 miles per hour (310.584 km/h), surpassing Mike Bliss' record of 28.540 seconds and 189.280 miles per hour (304.617 km/h) set at the NEXTEL Open held six days earlier; the top 18 qualifiers eventually passed Bliss' record. Jason Leffler, Bobby Hamilton Jr., Hermie Sadler, Boris Said, Jeff Fuller, Carl Long, Tony Raines, Mike Garvey, Kirk Shelmerdine and Greg Sacks failed to qualify for the race.

Pos.	No.	Driver	Make	Speed	Time	Behind
1	12	Ryan Newman	Dodge	192.988	27.981	0.000
2	24	Jeff Gordon	Chevrolet	191.925	28.136	00.155
3	17	Matt Kenseth	Ford	191.259	28.234	00.253
4	9	Kasey Kahne	Dodge	190.779	28.305	00.324
5	48	Jimmie Johnson	Chevrolet	190.739	28.311	00.330
6	5	Kyle Busch	Chevrolet	190.685	28.319	00.338
7	88	Dale Jarrett	Ford	190.490	28.348	00.367
8	0	Mike Bliss	Chevrolet	190.355	28.368	00.387
9	20	Tony Stewart	Chevrolet	190.114	28.404	00.423
10	38	Elliott Sadler	Ford	189.980	28.424	00.443
11	42	Jamie McMurray	Dodge	189.860	28.442	00.461
12	99	Carl Edwards	Ford	189.800	28.451	00.470
13	6	Mark Martin	Ford	189.580	28.484	00.503
14	25	Brian Vickers	Chevrolet	189.527	28.492	00.511
15	8	Dale Earnhardt Jr	Chevrolet	189.474	28.500	00.519
16	21	Ricky Rudd	Ford	189.327	28.522	00.541
17	50	Jimmy Spencer	Dodge	189.281	28.529	00.548
18	77	Travis Kvapil	Dodge	189.241	28.535	00.554
19	09	Johnny Sauter	Dodge	189.168	28.546	00.565
20	2	Rusty Wallace	Dodge	189.122	28.553	00.572
21	49	Ken Schrader	Dodge	189.109	28.555	00.574
22	23	Mike Skinner	Dodge	189.010	28.570	00.589
23	15	Michael Waltrip	Chevrolet	188.844	28.595	00.614
24	41	Casey Mears	Dodge	188.831	28.597	00.616
25	7	Robby Gordon	Chevrolet	188.739	28.611	00.630
26	44	Terry Labonte	Chevrolet	188.719	28.614	00.633
27	91	Bill Elliott	Dodge	188.646	28.625	00.644
28	10	Scott Riggs	Chevrolet	188.633	28.627	00.646
29	16	Greg Biffle	Ford	188.587	28.634	00.653
30	1	Martin Truex Jr	Chevrolet	188.501	28.647	00.666
31	07	Dave Blaney	Chevrolet	188.363	28.668	00.687
32	22	Scott Wimmer	Dodge	188.088	28.710	00.729
33	29	Kevin Harvick	Chevrolet	187.977	28.727	00.746
34	18	Bobby Labonte	Chevrolet	187.859	28.745	00.764
35	97	Kurt Busch	Ford	187.852	28.746	00.765
36	19	Jeremy Mayfield	Dodge	187.617	28.782	00.801
37	45	Kyle Petty	Dodge	187.598	28.785	00.804
38	01	Joe Nemechek	Chevrolet	187.383	28.818	00.837
39	43	Jeff Green	Dodge	187.110	28.860	00.879
40	31	Jeff Burton	Chevrolet	186.883	28.895	00.914
41	40	Sterling Marlin	Dodge	186.677	28.927	00.946
42	4	Mike Wallace	Chevrolet	185.395	29.127	01.146
43	37	Kevin Lepage	Dodge	188.278	28.681	00.700
Failed to qualify
44	11	Jason Leffler	Chevrolet		28.783	
45	32	Bobby Hamilton Jr.	Chevrolet		28.882	
46	66	Hermie Sadler	Ford		28.905	
47	36	Boris Said	Chevrolet		29.073	
48	34	Jeff Fuller	Chevrolet		29.123	
49	00	Carl Long	Chevrolet		29.156	
50	92	Tony Raines	Chevrolet		29.434	
51	75	Mike Garvey	Dodge		29.443	
52	27	Kirk Shelmerdine	Ford		30.015	
53	13	Greg Sacks	Dodge	0.000	0.000	0.000

== Race recap ==
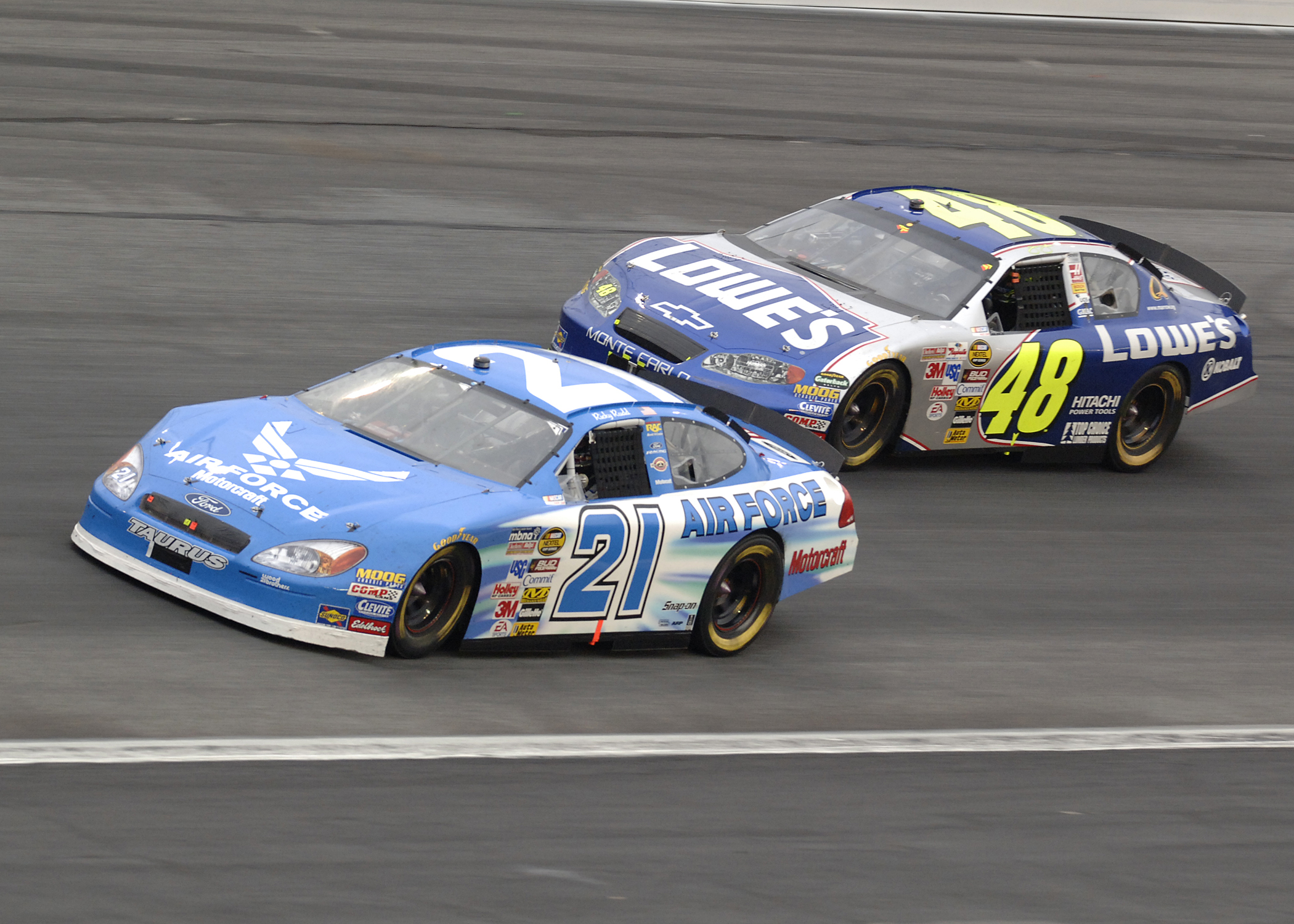
Winner Jimmie Johnson battling with Ricky Rudd during the race

The race was marred by a Cup Series record 22 caution flags. The first flew on lap 7 for Martin Truex Jr.'s accident in turn 2, followed by Kurt Busch's crash on lap 11. Another caution was flown for debris on lap 94, and on lap 102, five cars (Jimmy Spencer, Scott Riggs, Mike Skinner, Robby Gordon, and Michael Waltrip) crashed on the backstretch. Another debris caution was flown on lap 115, and on the 140th lap, Johnny Sauter crashed in turn 3. Elliott Sadler's spin on lap 151 brought out another caution, and on lap 163, Busch was involved in another crash in turn 2. On lap 201, Scott Wimmer was spun, and Travis Kvapil's crash on lap 210 caused the tenth caution of the race. On lap 217, Truex, Sterling Marlin, and Casey Mears crashed in turn 2, and on lap 228, Marlin and Mears' Chip Ganassi Racing teammate Jamie McMurray crashed in turn 2. On lap 235, Gordon was involved in an accident in turn 4, and six laps later, McMurray was spun in turn 4. On lap 247, Waltrip, Dale Earnhardt Jr., Matt Kenseth, and Terry Labonte were involved in a crash on the frontstretch. The crash caused Labonte to be taken to the Carolinas Medical Center, where he was eventually released. After a debris caution on lap 267, Dave Blaney was spun on the frontstretch on lap 290. On lap 308, another caution was flown for an oil spill on the track, and another debris caution was flown on lap 357. The twentieth caution of the race occurred on lap 368 when Blaney's car stalled while entering pit road. On lap 380, Jeff Gordon, Brian Vickers (who led the most laps of the race with 98), Kevin Harvick, Mark Martin, and Bill Elliott crashed in turn 1, while the final and 22nd caution was thrown on lap 392 for Joe Nemechek and Wimmer's accident in turn 4. The last caution eventually forced the red flag to be flown, temporarily pausing the race.

Meanwhile, Jimmie Johnson, the only Hendrick Motorsports driver in contention after teammates Jeff Gordon, Brian Vickers, and Terry Labonte had crashed and Kyle Busch had fallen back, was in fourth for the final restart with five laps remaining. After passing pole-sitter Ryan Newman and Carl Edwards, Johnson had a shot to win the race and beat Bobby Labonte. With four to go, Johnson closed the gap from a few car lengths to be on Bobby Labonte's back bumper with three to go. On the final lap, Johnson attempted to pass Labonte on the inside but was not able to get there and went back behind Labonte. In the final two corners, Johnson tried the outside and was able to make it stick and Johnson beat Labonte to the finish by .027 seconds, the closest finish in Lowe's Motor Speedway history since the introduction of electronic scoring. The win was Johnson's third consecutive 600, a NASCAR record, passing six drivers (Jeff Gordon, Dale Earnhardt, Darrell Waltrip (twice), Neil Bonnett, and Buddy Baker) for the record. It was also Johnson's third win in a row at Lowe's. Edwards, Jeremy Mayfield and Newman rounded out the top five, Greg Biffle, Martin Truex Jr., Dale Jarrett, Ken Schrader, and Rusty Wallace closed out the Top 10.

=== Lap 400 call ===
The race was broadcast on Fox Sports, with Mike Joy, Larry McReynolds, and Darrell Waltrip as commentators. Neil Goldberg was producer and Artie Kempner was director. The call of the final lap has become one of motorsport's signature calls. This is the transcript of the final lap.

Joy: Last time!

Waltrip: (Johnson) can't do it. I don't think he can do it unless Bobby (Labonte) messes up.

McReynolds: There (Johnson) goes to the bottom, Darrell, they'll be side by side coming off turn two, Bobby's on the high side!

Waltrip: You can't pass over there. There's no way. (With the grinding issues over the off-season, it had become harder to use the inside line.)

Joy: Was that the last best move made too soon?

Waltrip: Outside, outside, Here (Johnson) comes, outside, outside. (Artie Kempner, director, cuts to a scene of Johnson making the pass on the outside.)

McReynolds: Just like in Atlanta last March (from the Golden Corral 500 two months prior, when Johnson was passed by Carl Edwards on the outside exiting Turn 4), he's not going to be able to do it I don't think, they're side by side!

Joy: Yes he is! Here he comes, Jimmie Johnson!

McReynolds: Driver of the forty-eight car.

Waltrip: He did it, three in a row, Jimmie Johnson!

McReynolds: By two one hundredths of a second. (0.02)

Waltrip: I thought when (Johnson) got beat at turn two it was all over, but he drove it in on the outside and won it!

Joy: Boy, was that worth staying up late for or what?

== Results ==
Fin	St	No.	Driver	Make	Team	Laps	Led	Status	Pts	Winnings
1	5	48	Jimmie Johnson	Chevy	Hendrick Motorsports	400	11	running	185	470091
2	34	18	Bobby Labonte	Chevy	Joe Gibbs Racing	400	10	running	175	273275
3	12	99	Carl Edwards	Ford	Roush Racing	400	10	running	170	193300
4	36	19	Jeremy Mayfield	Dodge	Evernham Motorsports	400	0	running	160	175195
5	1	12	Ryan Newman	Dodge	Penske Racing South	400	43	running	160	238191
6	29	16	Greg Biffle	Ford	Roush Racing	400	1	running	155	134725
7	30	1	Martin Truex Jr.	Chevy	Dale Earnhardt, Inc.	400	4	running	151	111500
8	7	88	Dale Jarrett	Ford	Yates Racing	400	0	running	142	144208
9	21	49	Ken Schrader	Dodge	BAM Racing	400	6	running	143	106150
10	20	2	Rusty Wallace	Dodge	Penske Racing South	400	15	running	139	144958
11	39	43	Jeff Green	Dodge	Petty Enterprises	400	0	running	130	133566
12	43	37	Kevin Lepage	Dodge	John Carter Racing	400	0	running	127	97525
13	10	38	Elliott Sadler	Ford	Yates Racing	400	4	running	129	136066
14	33	29	Kevin Harvick	Chevy	Richard Childress Racing	400	0	running	121	140436
15	8	0	Mike Bliss	Chevy	Haas CNC Racing	400	0	running	118	98500
16	42	4	Mike Wallace	Chevy	Morgan-McClure Motorsports	400	0	running	115	95300
17	37	45	Kyle Petty	Dodge	Petty Enterprises	400	1	running	117	112143
18	38	01	Joe Nemechek	Chevy	MB2 Motorsports	400	26	running	114	116933
19	28	10	Scott Riggs	Chevy	MBV Motorsports	400	0	running	106	113758
20	27	91	Bill Elliott	Dodge	Evernham Motorsports	400	13	running	108	96325
21	11	42	Jamie McMurray	Dodge	Chip Ganassi Racing	399	0	running	100	98150
22	40	31	Jeff Burton	Chevy	Richard Childress Racing	399	0	running	97	115080
23	32	22	Scott Wimmer	Dodge	Bill Davis Racing	399	0	running	94	108408
24	9	20	Tony Stewart	Chevy	Joe Gibbs Racing	398	0	running	91	132461
25	6	5	Kyle Busch	Chevy	Hendrick Motorsports	398	55	running	93	101825
26	4	9	Kasey Kahne	Dodge	Evernham Motorsports	396	11	running	90	127900
27	25	7	Robby Gordon	Chevy	Ultra Motorsports	393	0	crash	82	81800
28	13	6	Mark Martin	Ford	Roush Racing	390	0	crash	79	99275
29	31	07	Dave Blaney	Chevy	Richard Childress Racing	385	0	running	76	92150
30	2	24	Jeff Gordon	Chevy	Hendrick Motorsports	382	49	crash	78	140261
31	14	25	Brian Vickers	Chevy	Hendrick Motorsports	379	98	crash	80	104475
32	18	77	Travis Kvapil	Dodge	Penske-Jasper Racing	376	23	running	72	93750
33	15	8	Dale Earnhardt Jr.	Chevy	Dale Earnhardt, Inc.	373	0	running	64	128983
34	24	41	Casey Mears	Dodge	Chip Ganassi Racing	338	1	running	66	98017
35	16	21	Ricky Rudd	Ford	Wood Brothers Racing	305	1	engine	63	107489
36	23	15	Michael Waltrip	Chevy	Dale Earnhardt, Inc.	245	1	crash	60	107364
37	3	17	Matt Kenseth	Ford	Roush Racing	245	0	crash	52	131456
38	26	44	Terry Labonte	Chevy	Hendrick Motorsports	245	17	crash	54	79910
39	41	40	Sterling Marlin	Dodge	Chip Ganassi Racing	215	0	crash	46	107708
40	19	09	Johnny Sauter	Dodge	Phoenix Racing	137	0	crash	43	79690
41	22	23	Mike Skinner	Dodge	Bill Davis Racing	99	0	crash	40	79580
42	17	50	Jimmy Spencer	Dodge	Arnold Motorsports	98	0	crash	37	79485
43	35	97	Kurt Busch	Ford	Roush Racing	26	0	crash	34	132145

== Standings ==
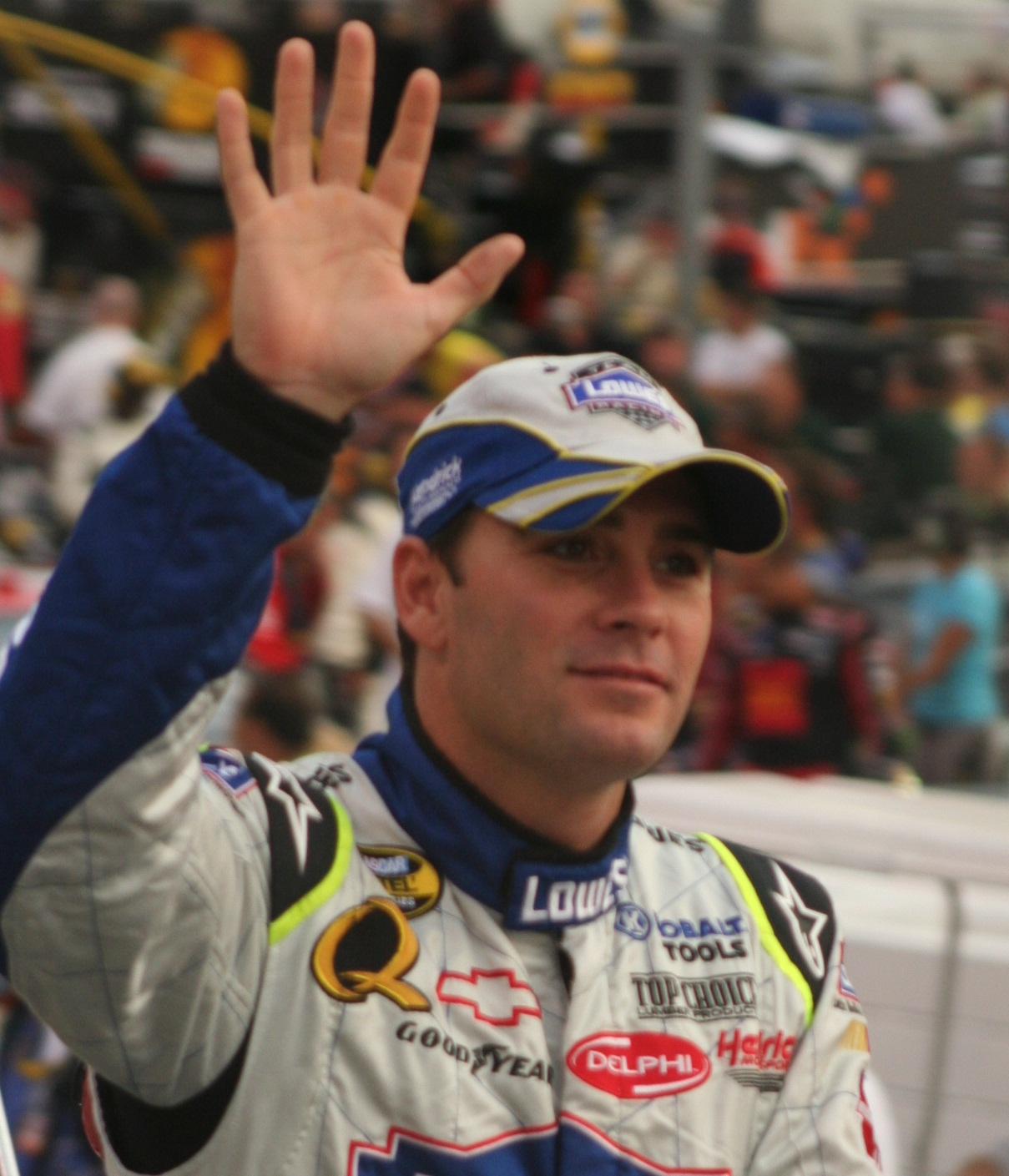
Race winner Jimmie Johnson led the points standings after the race.

Pos	Driver	Points
1	Jimmie Johnson	1747
2	Greg Biffle	1676
3	Elliott Sadler	1542
4	Ryan Newman	1530
5	Jeff Gordon	1516
6	Tony Stewart	1488
7	Kevin Harvick	1485
8	Carl Edwards	1459
9	Jamie McMurray	1451
10	Kurt Busch	1441

Previous race: 2005 Chevy American Revolution 400	Nextel Cup Series; 2005 season	Next race: 2005 MBNA RacePoints 400
