= Dan Pardus =

American racing driver (born 1963)

- Born: Daniel Joseph Pardus; April 2, 1963 (age 63); Port Orange, Florida, U.S.

NASCAR Cup Series career
- 1 race run over 1 year
- Best finish: 68th (1998)
- First race: 1998 Pepsi 400 (Daytona)
Wins	Top tens	Poles
0	0	0

NASCAR O'Reilly Auto Parts Series career
- 18 races run over 2 years
- Best finish: 49th (2002)
- First race: 2001 Pepsi 300 (Nashville)
- Last race: 2002 Little Trees 300 (Charlotte)
Wins	Top tens	Poles
0	0	0

Daniel Joseph Pardus (born April 2, 1963) is an American former professional stock car racing driver. He was a regular on the NASCAR Goody's Dash Series, and also competed in events in the Busch and Winston Cup Series, as well as the ARCA Re/Max Series.

== Racing career ==
A native of Port Orange, Florida, a suburb of Daytona Beach, Pardus, a graduate of Mainland High School, won back to back track championships at New Smyrna Speedway in 1980 and 1981. Pardus began racing in NASCAR's touring series in 1992, competing in the Goody's Dash Series, a series for four-cylinder subcompact cars. He ran in the series for several years, running a Chevrolet Cavalier and, later, a Pontiac Grand Am; he joined Jim & Judie Motorsports, the team he would run the majority of the remainder of his racing career for, before the 1995 season.

Pardus moved to the ARCA Re/MAX Series, a full-size stock car series, in 1997; running approximately half the series schedule, he placed third in the series' Rookie of the Year award standings and 12th overall. He ran only five races in the series in 1998, as he attempted to make his debut at the top level of NASCAR competition, the Winston Cup Series; he failed to qualify for a number of races through the season, and was injured early in the season in a practice crash at Texas Motor Speedway. In October he successfully made his debut, in what would prove to be his only start in the series, in the Pepsi 400 in October. Pardus finished 36th in the event, which had been delayed from July by extensive wildfires in central Florida.

Pardus entered the 1999 season intending to run the full 1999 Winston Cup Series schedule, competing for Rookie of the Year driving the No. 50 for Midwest Transit Racing. The team ran a limited schedule due to limited sponsorship; following his third failure to qualify in three attempts, at Charlotte Motor Speedway in May, Pardus was released as the team's driver, moving to a management position.

In 2000, driving for the Gardners, Pardus failed to qualify for the Daytona 500; after running a limited ARCA schedule in 2000, Pardus and the team moved to the NASCAR Busch Series in 2001, with sponsorship from The Outdoor Channel; he made his debut in the series at Nashville Superspeedway. In his second Busch Series race, at Chicagoland Speedway, Pardus was involved in a hard crash with David Donohue, suffering a broken back; he returned to competition later in the year, and ran a partial schedule in 2002, competing in twelve races, all but one for Jim & Judie Motorsports; the exception being a drive for Jay Robinson Racing in the GNC Live Well 250 at Daytona International Speedway; he also failed to qualify for six other races. Pardus' team hired pit crews from Winston Cup Series teams to pit their cars; at Nashville, due to a scheduling conflict, the crew for ML Motorsports pitted the car.

Following the 2002 season, The Outdoor Channel ended their sponsorship of Jim & Judie Motorsports; Pardus attempted to qualify for two races in 2003, at Daytona International Speedway and Darlington Raceway failing to qualify for both. Pardus would make one more attempt at a NASCAR start, in 2005 at Daytona, driving the No. 73 Chevrolet for Raabe Racing Enterprises in qualifying for the Pepsi 400; he failed to qualify for the event.

== Personal life ==
Pardus is married, to Alice. He has two children, Danielle and Preston, both of whom also race cars; Preston won the Sports Car Club of America Spec Miata national championship in 2017.

Pardus currently works as a utilities contractor, and worked as a part-time commentator for radio and TV broadcasts of racing events on SPEED Channel and HD Net, which he joined following his racing career.

== Motorsports career results ==
=== NASCAR ===
(key) (Bold – Pole position awarded by qualifying time. Italics – Pole position earned by points standings or practice time. * – Most laps led.)

==== Winston Cup Series ====
NASCAR Winston Cup Series results
Year	Team	No.	Make	1	2	3	4	5	6	7	8	9	10	11	12	13	14	15	16	17	18	19	20	21	22	23	24	25	26	27	28	29	30	31	32	33	34	NWCC	Pts	Ref
1998	Midwest Transit Racing	07	Chevy	DAY; DNQ	CAR	LVS	ATL	DAR	BRI	TEX	MAR	TAL; DNQ	CAL	CLT; DNQ	DOV	RCH	MCH	POC	SON	NHA	POC	IND; DNQ	GLN	MCH	BRI	NHA; DNQ	DAR	RCH	DOV	MAR	CLT	TAL; DNQ	DAY; 36	PHO	CAR	ATL		68th	55	
1999	Midwest Transit Racing	50	Chevy	DAY; DNQ	CAR; Wth^{†}	LVS	ATL	DAR	TEX	BRI	MAR	TAL; DNQ	CAL	RCH	CLT; DNQ	DOV	MCH	POC	SON	DAY	NHA	POC	IND	GLN	MCH	BRI	DAR	RCH	NHA	DOV	MAR	CLT	TAL	CAR	PHO	HOM	ATL	N/A	–	
2000	Jim & Judie Motorsports	65	Chevy	DAY; DNQ	CAR	LVS	ATL	DAR	BRI	TEX	MAR	TAL	CAL	RCH	CLT	DOV	MCH	POC	SON	DAY	NHA	POC	IND	GLN	MCH	BRI	DAR	RCH	NHA	DOV	MAR	CLT	TAL	CAR	PHO	HOM	ATL	N/A	–	
^{†} - Replaced after first round qualifying by Billy Standridge

===== Daytona 500 =====
Year	Team	Manufacturer	Start	Finish
1998	Midwest Transit Racing	Chevrolet	DNQ	
1999	Midwest Transit Racing	Chevrolet	DNQ	
2000	Jim & Judie Motorsports	Chevrolet	DNQ	

==== Busch Series ====
NASCAR Busch Series results
Year	Team	No.	Make	1	2	3	4	5	6	7	8	9	10	11	12	13	14	15	16	17	18	19	20	21	22	23	24	25	26	27	28	29	30	31	32	33	34	NBSC	Pts	Ref
2001	Jim & Judie Motorsports	32	Chevy	DAY	CAR	LVS	ATL	DAR	BRI	TEX	NSH; 35	TAL	CAL	RCH	NHA	NZH	CLT; DNQ	DOV	KEN; DNQ	MLW	GLN	CHI; 36	GTY	PPR	IRP	MCH	BRI	DAR; 31	RCH	DOV	KAN	CLT; 36	MEM	PHO; 29	CAR; 31	HOM; DNQ		61st	384	
2002	Jim & Judie Motorsports	32	Chevy	DAY; DNQ	CAR; 34	LVS; 33	DAR; 23	BRI	TEX; DNQ	NSH; 32	TAL	CAL	RCH; 34	NHA	NZH	CLT; 25	DOV	NSH; 35	KEN; 27	MLW		CHI; DNQ	GTY	PPR	IRP	MCH; 27	BRI	DAR; 39	RCH; DNQ	DOV	KAN	CLT; 42	MEM; DNQ	ATL	CAR; DNQ	PHO	HOM	49th	780	
2002	Jay Robinson Racing	49	Ford																		DAY; 41																	49th	780	
2003	Jay Robinson Racing	39	Ford	DAY	CAR	LVS	DAR	BRI	TEX	TAL	NSH	CAL	RCH	GTY	NZH	CLT	DOV	NSH	KEN	MLW	DAY; DNQ	CHI	NHA	PPR	IRP	MCH	BRI											N/A	–	
2003	Red Racing	91	Chevy																									DAR; DNQ	RCH	DOV	KAN	CLT	MEM	ATL	PHO	CAR	HOM	N/A	–	

=== ARCA Re/Max Series ===
(key) (Bold – Pole position awarded by qualifying time. Italics – Pole position earned by points standings or practice time. * – Most laps led.)

ARCA Re/Max Series results
Year	Team	No.	Make	1	2	3	4	5	6	7	8	9	10	11	12	13	14	15	16	17	18	19	20	21	22	23	24	25	ARMC	Pts	Ref
1997	Jim & Judie Motorsports	42	Chevy	DAY; 9	ATL; 8	SLM; 25	CLT; 31	CLT; 19	POC	MCH; 23	SBS	TOL	KIL	FRS	MIN; 16	POC	MCH; 11	DSF; 32	GTW; 28	SLM	WIN	CLT; 16	TAL; 8	ISF	ATL; 24				12th	–	
1998	Jim & Judie Motorsports	42	Chevy	DAY; 18	ATL	SLM; 4	CLT	MEM	MCH; 29	POC	SBS	TOL	PPR	POC	KIL	FRS	ISF	ATL	DSF	SLM; 32	TEX	WIN	CLT	TAL; 3	ATL				N/A	–	
1999	Jim & Judie Motorsports	42	Chevy	DAY; 38	ATL; 40	SLM; 15	AND	CLT; 9	MCH; 29	POC	TOL; 16	SBS	BLN	POC; 27	KIL	FRS	FLM	ISF	WIN	DSF	SLM	CLT; 40	TAL; 25	ATL; 22					32nd	1000	
2000	Jim & Judie Motorsports	42	Chevy	DAY; 7	SLM	AND	CLT; 14	KIL	FRS	MCH; 12	POC; 3	TOL	KEN; 4	BLN	POC; 22	WIN	ISF	KEN; 35	DSF	SLM	CLT; DNQ	TAL; 18	ATL; 11						22nd	1530	
2001	Jim & Judie Motorsports	42	Chevy	DAY; 24	NSH	WIN	SLM	GTY	KEN	CLT	KAN	MCH	POC	MEM	GLN	KEN	MCH	POC	NSH	ISF	CHI	DSF	SLM	TOL	BLN	CLT	TAL	ATL	151st	115	
