= 2005 Daytona 500 =

47th Daytona 500

Race details
- Race 1 of 36 in the 2005 NASCAR Nextel Cup Series
- 2005 Daytona 500 logo
- Date: February 20, 2005
- Location: Daytona International Speedway; Daytona Beach, Florida, U.S.
- Course: Permanent racing facility 2.5 mi (4.02336 km)
- Distance: 203 laps, 507.5 mi (816.742 km)
- Scheduled distance: 200 laps, 500 mi (804.672 km)
- Weather: Temperatures reaching up to 72 °F (22 °C); wind speeds approaching 11.1 miles per hour (17.9 km/h)
- Average speed: 135.173 miles per hour (217.540 km/h)
- Attendance: 200,000

Pole position
Driver	Dale Jarrett	Robert Yates Racing
- Time: 47.793

Qualifying race winners
Duel 1 Winner	Michael Waltrip	Dale Earnhardt, Inc.
Duel 2 Winner	Tony Stewart	Joe Gibbs Racing

Most laps led
Driver	Tony Stewart	Joe Gibbs Racing
- Laps: 107

Winner
No. 24	Jeff Gordon	Hendrick Motorsports

Television in the United States
- Network: Fox
- Announcers: Mike Joy, Darrell Waltrip, and Larry McReynolds
- Nielsen ratings: 10.9/23 (18.7 million viewers)

The 2005 Daytona 500, the 47th running of the event, was held on February 20, 2005, at Daytona International Speedway in Daytona Beach, Florida as the first race of the 2005 NASCAR Nextel Cup season. Dale Jarrett won the pole and Jeff Gordon won the race, making this his third Daytona 500 win. Kurt Busch finished second and Dale Earnhardt Jr. finished third.

As the result of NASCAR's implementation of the green-white-checker finish rule the previous season, the race had three extra laps due to a caution with three laps to go, reaching a total distance of 203 laps and 507.5 miles (816.7 km). Because of that, this was the first Daytona 500 to go longer than 500 miles. It was also the first Daytona 500 to end at sunset, around 6:18 pm EST.

A crowd of 200,000 people were estimated to have attended this race.

== Entry list ==
- (R) denotes rookie driver
- (W) denotes past 500 winner

No.	Driver	Team	Manufacturer
0	Mike Bliss	Haas CNC Racing	Chevrolet
00	Kenny Wallace	Michael Waltrip Racing	Chevrolet
1	Martin Truex Jr.	Dale Earnhardt Inc.	Chevrolet
01	Joe Nemechek	MB2 Motorsports	Chevrolet
2	Rusty Wallace	Penske-Jasper Racing	Dodge
4	Mike Wallace	Morgan–McClure Motorsports	Chevrolet
5	Kyle Busch (R)	Hendrick Motorsports	Chevrolet
6	Mark Martin	Roush Racing	Ford
7	Robby Gordon	Robby Gordon Motorsports	Chevrolet
07	Dave Blaney	Richard Childress Racing	Chevrolet
8	Dale Earnhardt Jr. (W)	Dale Earnhardt Inc.	Chevrolet
9	Kasey Kahne	Evernham Motorsports	Dodge
09	Johnny Sauter	Phoenix Racing	Dodge
10	Scott Riggs	MBV Motorsports	Chevrolet
11	Jason Leffler	Joe Gibbs Racing	Chevrolet
12	Ryan Newman	Penske-Jasper Racing	Dodge
13	Greg Sacks	Sacks Motorsports	Dodge
14	John Andretti	ppc Racing	Ford
15	Michael Waltrip (W)	Dale Earnhardt Inc.	Chevrolet
16	Greg Biffle	Roush Racing	Ford
17	Matt Kenseth	Roush Racing	Ford
18	Bobby Labonte	Joe Gibbs Racing	Chevrolet
19	Jeremy Mayfield	Evernham Motorsports	Dodge
20	Tony Stewart	Joe Gibbs Racing	Chevrolet
21	Ricky Rudd	Wood Brothers Racing	Ford
22	Scott Wimmer	Bill Davis Racing	Dodge
23	Mike Skinner	Bill Davis Racing	Dodge
24	Jeff Gordon (W)	Hendrick Motorsports	Chevrolet
25	Brian Vickers	Hendrick Motorsports	Chevrolet
27	Kirk Shelmerdine	Kirk Shelmerdine Racing	Ford
29	Kevin Harvick	Richard Childress Racing	Chevrolet
31	Jeff Burton	Richard Childress Racing	Chevrolet
32	Bobby Hamilton Jr.	PPI Motorsports	Chevrolet
33	Kerry Earnhardt	Richard Childress Racing	Chevrolet
34	Randy LaJoie	Mach 1 Racing	Chevrolet
36	Boris Said	MB Sutton Motorsports	Chevrolet
37	Kevin Lepage	R&J Racing	Dodge
38	Elliott Sadler	Robert Yates Racing	Ford
40	Sterling Marlin (W)	Chip Ganassi Racing	Dodge
41	Casey Mears	Chip Ganassi Racing	Dodge
42	Jamie McMurray	Chip Ganassi Racing	Dodge
43	Jeff Green	Petty Enterprises	Dodge
45	Kyle Petty	Petty Enterprises	Dodge
48	Jimmie Johnson	Hendrick Motorsports	Chevrolet
49	Ken Schrader	BAM Racing	Dodge
52	Larry Gunselman	Rick Ware Racing	Ford
55	Derrike Cope (W)	S.W.A.T. Racing	Chevrolet
66	Hermie Sadler	Peak Fitness Racing	Ford
73	Eric McClure	Raabe Racing Enterprises	Chevrolet
77	Travis Kvapil (R)	Penske-Jasper Racing	Dodge
80	Andy Belmont	Hover Motorsports	Ford
88	Dale Jarrett (W)	Robert Yates Racing	Ford
89	Morgan Shepherd	Shepherd Racing Ventures	Dodge
92	Stanton Barrett (R)	Front Row Motorsports	Chevrolet
93	Geoffrey Bodine (W)	GIC–Mixon Motorsports	Chevrolet
97	Kurt Busch	Roush Racing	Ford
99	Carl Edwards	Roush Racing	Ford

== Qualifying and Gatorade Duels ==
Three-time Daytona 500 champion Dale Jarrett won his third pole for this race with a speed of 188.312 miles per hour (303.059 km/h). 2001 and 2003 winner Michael Waltrip won the first Gatorade Duel and 2002 Cup Series champion Tony Stewart won the second. The main story focusing on the Gatorade Duels was an accident involving Jimmie Johnson and Kevin Harvick, which turned into a minor feud.

== Race summary ==
After a legendary “Start your engines” by Matthew McConaughey, the green flag waved with Dale Jarrett leading the field, but he lost the first lap to Jimmie Johnson and fell back through the field after a small bump from behind from defending Daytona 500 champion Dale Earnhardt Jr. Tony Stewart took the lead from Johnson on lap 4 and led 12 laps.

The first caution came out on lap 15 halfway through the first fuel run when Bobby Labonte blew an engine. The field chose to make pit stops during the caution period. Scott Wimmer, who had only changed two tires, led when the race restarted.

The second caution flew on lap 28 when Ricky Rudd spun out in the middle of the field, collecting five cars. On lap 36, Matt Kenseth, one of the pre-race favorites had smoke coming from the exhaust pipe and chose to make a pit stop under green flag conditions.

The wave of green-flag pit stops began on lap 61. The Dodges came in first, as they did not get as good fuel mileage as the other manufacturers. Earnhardt Jr. was pushed by Jeff Burton coming into his pit stop, and had to back up to get out after his tires were changed, causing him to drop down through the field. There was a total of seven speeding violations on pit road during these pit stops, most notably Johnson. Once the green flag pit stops cycled through on lap 64, Jeff Gordon had the lead.

Debris on the racetrack brought out the third caution on lap 86, with Gordon still out in front. After pit stops, Stewart led the race at the restart. Stewart was still leading at the halfway point, and when the fourth caution came out on lap 105 for debris.

On lap 137, there came another round of green-flag pit stops, with Stewart still in the lead. The fifth caution came out on lap 144 and the sixth one came on lap 155. Michael Waltrip suffered an engine failure on lap 160 which brought out the 7th caution flag, dropping him out of the race. Another round of pit stops took place on lap 164. Jason Leffler and Kasey Kahne collided together on pit road, dropping them both down the field. The wreck on pit road occurred when Kasey Kahne, who was 4th when the pit stops began, was exiting his pit stall, and Leffler was turning into his, unbeknownst to Kahne. Kahne would later rebound before becoming a victim of a couple of crashes not of his own making.

With 32 laps to go, John Andretti, running three-wide and following a group of cars going four-wide, crashed and turned into Leffler, taking him out of the race. This would bring up the eighth caution, with Stewart still out in front.

Stewart became the first driver since Bobby Allison in 1981 and 1982 to lead the most laps in two consecutive Daytona 500's.

The 9th caution flag came out on lap 184 due to the "Big One". This began when Greg Biffle ran into Scott Riggs, collecting 11 cars in turn 3. Scott Wimmer's car took the worst of it, as his car went onto the apron, flipped over four times, spun on its nose, and landed hard on its wheels. Only some cars chose to pit, and Stewart and the others stayed out. Earnhardt Jr., who had languished in midfield for the earlier part of the race, was now up to third place. Kasey Kahne was right in the middle of this crash in his #9 mango colored Dodge Charger, but managed to miss it. Kahne charged again back up through the field when the race went back green.

When the race restarted on lap 187, Andretti drove straight into Mike Skinner, starting a chain reaction crash (another "Big One") involving at least eight cars, bringing out the immediate 10th caution. This crash was the result of someone (possibly Skinner) missing a gear at the restart. Kasey Kahne was also involved in this crash, because as he checked up Dale Jarrett in the 88 accidentally punted him into the infield grass. Kahne spent a lot of time on pit road, but he did not lose a lap, and apparently his car was, or should have been being checked for fender rubs, when the race restarted Kahne made his way from about the 20th position to about the 8th position, but there was clearly still a tire rub on his right front fender; because it was clearly smoking, and FOX commentator Darrel Waltrip even made mention of it, as he made his way back up through the field again.

The race restarted with six laps to go. With five to go, Earnhardt Jr. briefly took the lead, but Stewart retook it on the next lap. The two drivers raced side-by-side until Earnhardt Jr. retook the lead. Gordon took the lead before the 11th caution came out with three laps to go. The caution came out when Kasey Kahne was on the outside moving forward from the 8th position trying keep his momentum up and move into the top 6 or so, as Kurt Busch made a pass on Tony Stewart, who was in the lead; but Jeff Gordon was also fighting on the outside with Stewart for the lead; Kahne slid up the race track hard probably due to a cut tire and as he did so, his teammate Jeremy Mayfield in the 19 car apparently got into the back of him as well and Kahne went into the wall. He could not get off the wall until about the middle of the backstretch, when NASCAR finally brought out the caution. Kahne would end up scored 22nd after being crashed while running 7th and possibly moving up into the top 5 to contend for the win. Oddly as the cars came around for the green flag Kahne's teammate Jeremy Mayfield came down to pit road from running 9th on the track, but apparently returned to the race and would end up finishing a position behind his teammate.

The race length of 200 laps and 500 miles (800 km) was completed under yellow, so a green-white-checker finish would take place. The race restarted on lap 202 with two laps to go. Despite much activity behind him, Gordon was able to hold off Kurt Busch and Earnhardt Jr. to win his third Daytona 500.

This was the third-slowest Daytona 500 to go the distance, with only both the 1960 and 2011 races were slower. Two other runnings of this race in the 2000s were also slower, but they both were rain-shortened.

== Results ==
Pos	Grid	Car	Driver	Team	Manufacturer	Laps	Laps Led	Status
1	15	24	Jeff Gordon (W)	Hendrick Motorsports	Chevrolet	203	29	Running
2	13	97	Kurt Busch	Roush Racing	Ford	203	0	Running
3	5	8	Dale Earnhardt Jr. (W)	Dale Earnhardt, Inc.	Chevrolet	203	2	Running
4	12	10	Scott Riggs	MBV Motorsports	Chevrolet	203	0	Running
5	2	48	Jimmie Johnson	Hendrick Motorsports	Chevrolet	203	3	Running
6	32	6	Mark Martin	Roush Racing	Ford	203	0	Running
7	4	20	Tony Stewart	Joe Gibbs Racing	Chevrolet	203	107	Running
8	18	40	Sterling Marlin (W)	Chip Ganassi Racing	Dodge	203	0	Running
9	8	37	Kevin Lepage	R&J Racing	Dodge	203	0	Running
10	36	2	Rusty Wallace	Penske-Jasper Racing	Dodge	203	0	Running
11	39	38	Elliott Sadler	Robert Yates Racing	Ford	203	0	Running
12	27	99	Carl Edwards	Roush Racing	Ford	203	0	Running
13	34	01	Joe Nemechek	MB2 Motorsports	Chevrolet	203	2	Running
14	38	07	Dave Blaney	Richard Childress Racing	Chevrolet	203	0	Running
15	1	88	Dale Jarrett (W)	Robert Yates Racing	Ford	203	0	Running
16	26	43	Jeff Green	Petty Enterprises	Dodge	203	0	Running
17	33	45	Kyle Petty	Petty Enterprises	Dodge	203	1	Running
18	35	0	Mike Bliss	Haas CNC Racing	Chevrolet	203	0	Running
19	25	77	Travis Kvapil (R)	Penske-Jasper Racing	Dodge	203	0	Running
20	9	12	Ryan Newman	Penske-Jasper Racing	Dodge	203	1	Running
21	28	25	Brian Vickers	Hendrick Motorsports	Chevrolet	203	0	Running
22	37	9	Kasey Kahne	Evernham Motorsports	Dodge	203	0	Running
23	24	19	Jeremy Mayfield	Evernham Motorsports	Dodge	203	1	Running
24	11	21	Ricky Rudd	Wood Brothers Racing	Ford	202	0	Flagged
25	23	16	Greg Biffle	Roush Racing	Ford	201	0	Flagged
26	29	41	Casey Mears	Chip Ganassi Racing	Dodge	199	0	Flagged
27	41	36	Boris Said	MB Sutton Motorsports	Chevrolet	198	0	Flagged
28	30	29	Kevin Harvick	Richard Childress Racing	Chevrolet	198	1	Flagged
29	6	31	Jeff Burton	Richard Childress Racing	Chevrolet	194	6	Flagged
30	7	23	Mike Skinner	Bill Davis Racing	Dodge	187	0	Contact FS
31	42	14	John Andretti	ppc Racing	Ford	187	0	Contact FS
32	17	42	Jamie McMurray	Chip Ganassi Racing	Dodge	184	0	Contact T4
33	16	22	Scott Wimmer	Bill Davis Racing	Dodge	182	8	Contact T4
34	10	1	Martin Truex Jr.	Dale Earnhardt, Inc.	Chevrolet	178	0	Engine
35	22	32	Bobby Hamilton Jr.	PPI Motorsports	Chevrolet	173	0	Flagged
36	40	11	Jason Leffler	Joe Gibbs Racing	Chevrolet	168	0	Contact T4
37	3	15	Michael Waltrip (W)	Dale Earnhardt, Inc.	Chevrolet	161	42	Engine
38	19	5	Kyle Busch (R)	Hendrick Motorsports	Chevrolet	148	0	Flagged
39	31	49	Ken Schrader	BAM Racing	Dodge	120	0	Engine
40	21	00	Kenny Wallace	Michael Waltrip Racing	Chevrolet	39	0	Engine
41	43	4	Mike Wallace	Morgan-McClure Motorsports	Chevrolet	35	0	Overheating
42	14	17	Matt Kenseth	Roush Racing	Ford	34	0	Engine
43	20	18	Bobby Labonte	Joe Gibbs Racing	Chevrolet	14	0	Engine
Failed to Qualify
44		7	Robby Gordon	Robby Gordon Motorsports	Chevrolet			
45		09	Johnny Sauter	Phoenix Racing	Dodge			
46		92	Stanton Barrett (R)	Front Row Motorsports	Chevrolet			
47		55	Derrike Cope (W)	S.W.A.T. Racing	Chevrolet			
48		89	Morgan Shepherd	Shepherd Racing Ventures	Dodge			
49		13	Greg Sacks	Sacks Motorsports	Dodge			
50		33	Kerry Earnhardt	Richard Childress Racing	Chevrolet			
51		73	Eric McClure	Raabe Racing Enterprises	Dodge			
52		52	Larry Gunselman	Rick Ware Racing	Ford			
53		66	Hermie Sadler	Peak Fitness Racing	Ford			
54		34	Randy LaJoie	Mach 1 Racing	Chevrolet			
55		93	Geoffrey Bodine (W)	GIC–Mixon Motorsports	Chevrolet			
56		80	Andy Belmont	Hover Motorsports	Ford			
57		27	Kirk Shelmerdine	Kirk Shelmerdine Racing	Ford			

Preceded by 2004 Ford 400	NASCAR Nextel Cup Season; 2005	Succeeded by 2005 Auto Club 500
