= 2005 Auto Club 500 =

Race details
- Race 2 of 36 in the 2005 NASCAR Nextel Cup Series season
- 2005 Auto Club 500 program cover with Jeff Gordon
- Date: February 27, 2005
- Official name: Auto Club 500
- Location: California Speedway, Fontana, California
- Course: Permanent racing facility
- Course length: 2.0 miles (3.219 km)
- Distance: 250 laps, 500 mi (804.672 km)
- Weather: Chilly with temperatures approaching 64.9 °F (18.3 °C) and wind speeds gathering up to 11.3 miles per hour (18.2 km/h)
- Average speed: 139.697 miles per hour (224.821 km/h)
- Attendance: 90,000

Pole position
Driver	Kyle Busch	Hendrick Motorsports

Most laps led
Driver	Joe Nemechek	MB2 Motorsports
- Laps: 63

Winner
No. 16	Greg Biffle	Roush Racing

Television in the United States
- Network: Fox Broadcasting Company
- Announcers: Mike Joy, Darrell Waltrip and Larry McReynolds

The 2005 Auto Club 500 was a NASCAR Nextel Cup Series stock car race held on February 27, 2005 at California Speedway in Fontana, California. Contested over 250 laps on the 2-mile (3.2-kilometre) asphalt D-shaped oval, it was the second race of the 2005 NASCAR Nextel Cup Series season. Greg Biffle of Roush Racing won the race, his first win of the season. Jimmie Johnson finished second and Kurt Busch finished third.

== Background ==
The track, Auto Club Speedway, was a four-turn superspeedway that was 2 miles (3.2 km) long. The track's turns were banked from fourteen degrees, while the front stretch, the location of the finish line, was banked at eleven degrees. Unlike the front stretch, the backstraightaway was banked at three degrees.

== Qualifying ==
Pos	Car #	Driver	Make	Primary Sponsor	Speed	Time	Behind
1	5	Kyle Busch	Chevrolet	CARQUEST	188.245	38.248	0.000
2	25	Brian Vickers	Chevrolet	GMAC	187.740	38.351	-0.103
3	19	Jeremy Mayfield	Dodge	Dodge Dealers / UAW	187.612	38.377	-0.129
4	1	Joe Nemechek	Chevrolet	U.S. Army	187.539	38.392	-0.144
5	16	Greg Biffle	Ford	3M Post-it / National Guard	187.003	38.502	-0.254
6	17	Matt Kenseth	Ford	USG Sheetrock / DEWALT	186.998	38.503	-0.255
7	88	Dale Jarrett	Ford	UPS	186.625	38.580	-0.332
8	48	Jimmie Johnson	Chevrolet	Lowe's	186.480	38.610	-0.362
9	12	Ryan Newman	Dodge	Alltel	186.461	38.614	-0.366
10	00	Mike Bliss	Chevrolet	NetZero Best Buy	186.403	38.626	-0.378
11	44	Terry Labonte	Chevrolet	Kellogg's	186.234	38.661	-0.413
12	10	Scott Riggs	Chevrolet	Valvoline	186.186	38.671	-0.423
13	40	Sterling Marlin	Dodge	Coors Light	186.124	38.684	-0.436
14	18	Bobby Labonte	Chevrolet	Interstate Batteries	185.999	38.710	-0.462
15	42	Jamie McMurray	Dodge	Texaco / Havoline	185.907	38.729	-0.481
16	41	Casey Mears	Dodge	Target	185.883	38.734	-0.486
17	9	Kasey Kahne	Dodge	Dodge Dealers / UAW / Mountain Dew	185.711	38.770	-0.522
18	6	Mark Martin	Ford	Viagra	185.696	38.773	-0.525
19	99	Carl Edwards	Ford	Office Depot	185.653	38.782	-0.534
20	97	Kurt Busch	Ford	Sharpie / IRWIN Industrial Tools	185.615	38.790	-0.542
21	21	Ricky Rudd	Ford	Motorcraft Genuine Parts	185.486	38.817	-0.569
22	91	Bill Elliott	Dodge	Stanley Tools	185.452	38.824	-0.576
23	2	Rusty Wallace	Dodge	Miller Lite	185.447	38.825	-0.577
24	14	John Andretti	Ford	VB / APlus at Sunoco	184.867	38.947	-0.699
25	7	Robby Gordon	Chevrolet	Harrah's	184.833	38.954	-0.706
26	32	Bobby Hamilton Jr	Chevrolet	Tide - Give Kids The World	184.786	38.964	-0.716
27	22	Scott Wimmer	Dodge	Caterpillar	184.777	38.966	-0.718
28	24	Jeff Gordon	Chevrolet	DuPont	184.677	38.987	-0.739
29	20	Tony Stewart	Chevrolet	The Home Depot	184.219	39.084	-0.836
30	15	Michael Waltrip	Chevrolet	NAPA Auto Parts	183.852	39.162	-0.914
31	29	Kevin Harvick	Chevrolet	GM Goodwrench	183.828	39.167	-0.919
32	31	Jeff Burton	Chevrolet	Cingular Wireless	183.645	39.206	-0.958
33	4	Mike Wallace	Chevrolet	Lucas Oil Products	183.570	39.222	-0.974
34	34	Randy LaJoie	Chevrolet	Mach One Inc.	183.043	39.335	-1.087
35	77	Travis Kvapil	Dodge	Kodak / Jasper Engines	182.997	39.345	-1.097
36	45	Kyle Petty	Dodge	Georgia-Pacific / Brawny	182.987	39.347	-1.099
37	43	Jeff Green	Dodge	General Mills Whole Grain	182.932	39.359	-1.111
38	49	Ken Schrader	Dodge	Schwan's Home Service	182.866	39.373	-1.125
39	11	Jason Leffler	Chevrolet	FedEx Express	182.597	39.431	-1.183
40	8	Dale Earnhardt Jr	Chevrolet	Budweiser	181.938	39.574	-1.326
41	38	Elliott Sadler	Ford	Pedigree	179.029	40.217	-1.969
42	7	Dave Blaney	Chevrolet	Jack Daniel's	0.000	0.000	0.000
43	37	Kevin Lepage	Dodge	Carter's Royal Dispos-all	181.507	39.668	-1.420
Failed to qualify
44	92	Stanton Barrett	Chevrolet	First Trust Portfolio		39.759	
45	66	Hermie Sadler	Dodge	Peak Fitness		40.002	
46	79	Stan Boyd	Chevrolet	Conely Racing		40.013	
47	73	Eric McClure	Chevrolet	ARC Dehooker	0.000	0.000	0.000
48	27	Kirk Shelmerdine	Chevrolet	Kirk Shelmerdine Racing	0.000	0.000	0.000

== Summary ==
Magic Johnson gave the command for drivers to start their engines, and California governor Arnold Schwarzenegger waved the green flag, which was taken by 19-year-old Kyle Busch. Busch became the youngest driver to ever take the green flag on pole position. Busch was still leading after the first lap, with Brian Vickers in second place.

Before the race, Greg Biffle had promised to reporters and commentators that he would have the lead within 5 laps. He also happened to promise to win the race.

Greg Biffle took the lead in only 4 laps, followed by Matt Kenseth in second place, and Biffle was still in the lead after 26 laps, when Bill Elliott went into the wall. Biffle was immediately overtaken by Matt Kenseth after the restart. Dale Earnhardt Jr. pitted on lap 38, going down a lap, with problems on his left front tire. Carl Edwards took over the lead around lap 46.

On lap 59, Earnhardt – already a lap down – had another problem with his left front tire and the debris brought out the caution a lap later. Ultimately Earnhardt would end up 13 laps behind. Edwards was still in the lead when the caution came out. Kenseth took over the lap during the caution, and Edwards retook it within a lap. Kenseth recaptured the lead at lap 70.

Green flag pitstops started on lap 105. However, on lap 107, well before the green flag pitstops had cycled, a caution came out for debris. Joe Nemechek led on the restart on lap 116. Dave Blaney hit the wall on lap 143 leading to the third caution, with Nemechek still leading over Johnson. At the restart on lap 151, Nemechek was leading from Mark Martin and Jimmie Johnson with 26 cars on the lead lap. Within a lap, Johnson was second.

Another caution came out on lap 161 when Kasey Kahne went into the wall. At the restart, Johnson led over Nemechek, but after a three-car tussle for the lead, Nemechek led on lap 166. However, Nemechek's success was short-lived: around lap 180, engine problems saw him fall down the leader board and he had to retire. Edwards took over the lead. Harvick then took over with about 55 laps to go.

With 48 laps to go Michael Waltrip’s engine blew, bringing out the 6th caution, and when the green came out with 41 laps to go, Harvick was leading in front of Kenseth and Gordon. With 34 laps to go, the 7th caution came out because Jason Leffler was in trouble. Most of the leaders pitted, but cars that stayed out took the first six places on the restart, led by Kurt Busch. The race restarted with 29 laps to go.

With 25 laps to go, Busch and Biffle pulled out into a 2-second lead, vying together for first place. Greg Biffle finally retook the lead on lap 228 and kept it to win the race ahead of Jimmie Johnson and Kurt Busch, with only 0.525 of a second separating the top three men.

== Race results ==
Pos	Grid	No.	Driver	Team	Manufacturer	Laps	Points
1	5	16	Greg Biffle	Roush Racing	Ford	250	185
2	8	48	Jimmie Johnson (W)	Hendrick Motorsports	Chevrolet	250	175
3	20	97	Kurt Busch (W)	Roush Racing	Ford	250	170
4	15	42	Jamie McMurray	Chip Ganassi Racing	Dodge	250	160
5	19	99	Carl Edwards (R)	Roush Racing	Ford	250	160
6	31	29	Kevin Harvick	Richard Childress Racing	Chevrolet	250	155
7	18	6	Mark Martin (W)	Roush Racing	Ford	250	151
8	41	38	Elliott Sadler	Robert Yates Racing	Ford	250	142
9	9	12	Ryan Newman	Penske Racing	Dodge	250	138
10	23	2	Rusty Wallace (W)	Penske Racing	Dodge	250	134
11	7	88	Dale Jarrett	Robert Yates Racing	Ford	250	130
12	10	0	Mike Bliss	Haas CNC Racing	Chevrolet	250	127
13	14	18	Bobby Labonte	Joe Gibbs Racing	Chevrolet	250	124
14	38	49	Ken Schrader	BAM Racing	Dodge	250	121
15	13	40	Sterling Marlin	Chip Ganassi Racing	Dodge	250	118
16	27	22	Scott Wimmer	Bill Davis Racing	Dodge	250	115
17	29	20	Tony Stewart	Joe Gibbs Racing	Chevrolet	250	112
18	36	45	Kyle Petty	Petty Enterprises	Dodge	250	114
19	32	31	Jeff Burton	Richard Childress Racing	Chevrolet	250	106
20	26	32	Bobby Hamilton Jr. (R)	PPI Motorsports	Chevrolet	250	103
21	2	25	Brian Vickers	Hendrick Motorsports	Chevrolet	250	105
22	16	41	Casey Mears	Chip Ganassi Racing	Dodge	249	97
23	1	5	Kyle Busch (R)	Hendrick Motorsports	Chevrolet	249	99
24	35	77	Travis Kvapil (R)	Penske Racing	Dodge	249	91
25	33	4	Mike Wallace	Morgan-McClure Motorsports	Chevrolet	249	88
26	6	17	Matt Kenseth	Roush Racing	Ford	249	90
27	37	43	Jeff Green	Petty Enterprises	Dodge	249	87
28	3	19	Jeremy Mayfield (W)	Evernham Motorsports	Dodge	248	84
29	24	14	John Andretti	ppc Racing	Ford	248	76
30	28	24	Jeff Gordon (W)	Hendrick Motorsports	Chevrolet	246	73
31	43	37	Kevin Lepage	R&J Racing	Dodge	241	70
32	40	8	Dale Earnhardt Jr.	Dale Earnhardt, Inc.	Chevrolet	237	67
33	12	10	Scott Riggs	MBV Motorsports	Chevrolet	229	64
34	42	07	Dave Blaney	Richard Childress Racing	Chevrolet	224	61
35	25	7	Robby Gordon	Robby Gordon Motorsports	Chevrolet	222	58
36	11	44	Terry Labonte	Hendrick Motorsports	Chevrolet	216	55
37	39	11	Jason Leffler	Joe Gibbs Racing	Chevrolet	215	52
38	30	15	Michael Waltrip	Dale Earnhardt, Inc.	Chevrolet	203	49
39	4	01	Joe Nemechek	MB2 Motorsports	Chevrolet	180	56
40	17	9	Kasey Kahne	Evernham Motorsports	Dodge	167	43
41	21	21	Ricky Rudd	Wood Brothers Racing	Ford	145	40
42	34	34	Randy LaJoie	Mach 1 Racing	Chevrolet	47	42
43	22	91	Bill Elliott	Evernham Motorsports	Dodge	23	34

== Race statistics ==
- Time of race: 3:34:45
- Average Speed: 139.697 miles per hour (224.821 km/h)
- Pole Speed: 188.245 miles per hour (302.951 km/h)
- Cautions: 7 for 40 laps
- Margin of Victory: 0.231 sec
- Lead changes: 26
- Percent of race run under caution: 16%
- Average green flag run: 26.2 laps

Preceded by 2005 Daytona 500	NASCAR Nextel Cup Series Season; 2005	Succeeded by 2005 UAW-DaimlerChrysler 400
