= 2019 Bojangles' Southern 500 =

Auto race

Race details
- Race 25 of 36 in the 2019 Monster Energy NASCAR Cup Series
- 2019 Bojangles' Southern 500 program cover, featuring Dale Earnhardt Sr., Jeff Gordon, Harry Gant, and Bill Elliott
- Date: September 1–2, 2019
- Location: Darlington Raceway in Darlington, South Carolina
- Course: Permanent racing facility
- Course length: 1.366 miles (2.198 km)
- Distance: 367 laps, 501.322 mi (806.666 km)
- Average speed: 133.825 miles per hour (215.370 km/h)

Pole position
Driver	William Byron	Hendrick Motorsports
- Time: 28.510

Most laps led
Driver	Kyle Busch	Joe Gibbs Racing
- Laps: 118

Winner
No. 20	Erik Jones	Joe Gibbs Racing

Television in the United States
- Network: NBCSN
- Announcers: Rick Allen, Jeff Burton, Steve Letarte, Dale Earnhardt Jr., Dale Jarrett and Kyle Petty
- Nielsen ratings: 2.139 million

Radio in the United States
- Radio: MRN
- Booth announcers: Alex Hayden, Jeff Striegle and Rusty Wallace
- Turn announcers: Dave Moody (1 & 2) and Mike Bagley (3 & 4)

The 2019 Bojangles' Southern 500, the 70th running of the event was a Monster Energy NASCAR Cup Series race held on September 1–2, 2019, at Darlington Raceway in Darlington, South Carolina. Contested over 367 laps on the 1.366-mile (2.198 km) egg-shaped oval, it was the 25th race of the 2019 Monster Energy NASCAR Cup Series season.

== Report ==
=== Background ===
Layout of Darlington Raceway, the track where the race is held.

Darlington Raceway is a race track built for NASCAR racing located near Darlington, South Carolina. It is nicknamed "The Lady in Black" and "The Track Too Tough to Tame" by many NASCAR fans and drivers and advertised as "A NASCAR Tradition." It is of a unique, somewhat egg-shaped design, an oval with the ends of very different configurations, a condition which supposedly arose from the proximity of one end of the track to a minnow pond the owner refused to relocate. This situation makes it very challenging for the crews to set up their cars' handling in a way that is effective at both ends.

==== Entry list ====
- (i) denotes driver who are ineligible for series driver points.
- (R) denotes rookie driver.

No.	Driver	Team	Manufacturer	Sponsor or Throwback
00	Landon Cassill (i)	StarCom Racing	Chevrolet	StarCom Fiber – Sterling Marlin's 2001 Coors Light scheme.
1	Kurt Busch	Chip Ganassi Racing	Chevrolet	Chevrolet Accessories – Busch's personal 1969 Chevrolet Camaro inspired car
2	Brad Keselowski	Team Penske	Ford	Miller – Rusty Wallace's 1996 car scheme
3	Austin Dillon	Richard Childress Racing	Chevrolet	American Ethanol E15 – Scheme pays homage to grandfather and team owner Richard Childress' “Black Gold” car from the late 1970s.
4	Kevin Harvick	Stewart-Haas Racing	Ford	Busch Beer/Big Buck Hunter
6	Ryan Newman	Roush Fenway Racing	Ford	Oscar Mayer/Velveeta – Mark Martin's 1993 Mountain Dew Southern 500 car
8	Daniel Hemric (R)	Richard Childress Racing	Chevrolet	Caterpillar Inc. – Scheme inspired by the design of Caterpillar Inc. from its launch in 1925 until 1931
9	Chase Elliott	Hendrick Motorsports	Chevrolet	NAPA Auto Parts – Father Bill Elliott's 1981 Southern 500 car where he claimed his first Cup pole.
10	Aric Almirola	Stewart-Haas Racing	Ford	Smithfield Foods – Tony Stewart's 2002 championship The Home Depot car
11	Denny Hamlin	Joe Gibbs Racing	Toyota	FedEx – Darrell Waltrip's 1991-95 Western Auto car
12	Ryan Blaney	Team Penske	Ford	Menards/Pennzoil – Michael Waltrip's 1991-95 car scheme
13	Ty Dillon	Germain Racing	Chevrolet	GEICO
14	Clint Bowyer	Stewart-Haas Racing	Ford	Rush Truck Centers/Mobil 1 – Tony Stewart's 2011 championship Office Depot/Mobil 1 car
15	Ross Chastain (i)	Premium Motorsports	Chevrolet	Rim Ryderz
17	Ricky Stenhouse Jr.	Roush Fenway Racing	Ford	Dog's Most Wanted
18	Kyle Busch	Joe Gibbs Racing	Toyota	Snickers – Bobby Hillin Jr.'s 1990 car scheme
19	Martin Truex Jr.	Joe Gibbs Racing	Toyota	Bass Pro Shops – Truex's 2004 Xfinity Series car he drove for Dale Earnhardt Jr.'s Chance 2 Motorsports.
20	Erik Jones	Joe Gibbs Racing	Toyota	Sport Clips – Jones' ASA Late Model Series scheme from his rookie season
21	Paul Menard	Wood Brothers Racing	Ford	Ford Motorcraft/Quick Lane Tire & Auto Center – Team owner Glen Wood's 1957 Darlington inspired car
22	Joey Logano	Team Penske	Ford	Shell Pennzoil – Kevin Harvick's 2007 Daytona 500 inspired car
24	William Byron	Hendrick Motorsports	Chevrolet	Hendrick Autoguard/City Chevrolet – Days of Thunder protagonist Cole Trickle's #46 inspired car
27	Joe Nemechek (i)	Premium Motorsports	Chevrolet	Low T Center – Nemechek's first Cup race since March 2015 at Atlanta Motor Speedway. Driver throwback instead of a car throwback.
32	Corey LaJoie	Go Fas Racing	Ford	Keen Parts/CorvetteParts.net – Dale Jarrett's 1990-91 Xfinity Series Nestlé Crunch car
34	Michael McDowell	Front Row Motorsports	Ford	Dockside Logistics – Jimmy Means' powder blue Alka-Seltzer scheme from the late 1980s and early 1990s.
36	Matt Tifft (R)	Front Row Motorsports	Ford	Tifft Family – Tifft's car is based on a Dirt Late Model car his father owned, which was driven by David Hilliker.
37	Chris Buescher	JTG Daugherty Racing	Chevrolet	Kroger Fast Lane to Flavor
38	David Ragan	Front Row Motorsports	Ford	Shriners Hospitals for Children – David Pearson’s 1969 championship inspired car
41	Daniel Suárez	Stewart-Haas Racing	Ford	Haas Automation – Tony Stewart's 2005 championship The Home Depot car
42	Kyle Larson	Chip Ganassi Racing	Chevrolet	Clover – Ricky Craven's 1995-96 Kodiak car
43	Bubba Wallace	Richard Petty Motorsports	Chevrolet	Victory Junction 15th Anniversary – Adam Petty's 1999 Spree car.
47	Ryan Preece (R)	JTG Daugherty Racing	Chevrolet	Kroger – Grandfather Ron Bouchard's 1984 Hawaiian Punch car.
48	Jimmie Johnson	Hendrick Motorsports	Chevrolet	Ally – Johnson's 1995 Trophy truck scheme
51	B. J. McLeod (i)	Petty Ware Racing	Chevrolet	Jacob Companies – Stroker Ace inspired car
52	J. J. Yeley (i)	Rick Ware Racing	Chevrolet	Jacob Companies – Bill Blair's 1953 inspired car
54	Garrett Smithley (i)	Rick Ware Racing	Chevrolet	ARQE.app – Lennie Pond's 1976 Pepsi scheme
66	Joey Gase (i)	MBM Motorsports	Toyota	Page Construction
77	Reed Sorenson	Spire Motorsports	Chevrolet	Motor Racing Network – Scheme honors the 50th anniversary of the Motor Racing Network and the 11 radio affiliates that have broadcast NASCAR races since its inception in 1970.
88	Alex Bowman	Hendrick Motorsports	Chevrolet	Axalta Coating Systems – Tim Richmond's 1986-1987 Folgers car.
95	Matt DiBenedetto	Leavine Family Racing	Toyota	IMSA GTO – Tribute to the turbo-charged GTO Celicas that won the driver’s championship in the IMSA GTU (under three-liter) category in 1987 with Chris Cord.
Official entry list

== Practice ==
=== First practice ===
Kurt Busch was the fastest in the first practice session with a time of 28.714 seconds and a speed of 171.261 mph (275.618 km/h).

Pos	No.	Driver	Team	Manufacturer	Time	Speed
1	1	Kurt Busch	Chip Ganassi Racing	Chevrolet	28.714	171.261
2	24	William Byron	Hendrick Motorsports	Chevrolet	28.808	170.703
3	10	Aric Almirola	Stewart-Haas Racing	Ford	28.916	170.065
Official first practice results

=== Final practice ===
Ricky Stenhouse Jr. was the fastest in the final practice session with a time of 29.125 seconds and a speed of 168.845 mph (271.730 km/h).

Pos	No.	Driver	Team	Manufacturer	Time	Speed
1	17	Ricky Stenhouse Jr.	Roush Fenway Racing	Ford	29.125	168.845
2	42	Kyle Larson	Chip Ganassi Racing	Chevrolet	29.139	168.764
3	24	William Byron	Hendrick Motorsports	Chevrolet	29.188	168.480
Official final practice results

== Qualifying ==
William Byron scored the pole for the race with a time of 28.510 and a speed of 172.487 mph (277.591 km/h).

=== Qualifying results ===
Pos	No.	Driver	Team	Manufacturer	Time
1	24	William Byron	Hendrick Motorsports	Chevrolet	28.510
2	2	Brad Keselowski	Team Penske	Ford	28.576
3	42	Kyle Larson	Chip Ganassi Racing	Chevrolet	28.617
4	1	Kurt Busch	Chip Ganassi Racing	Chevrolet	28.630
5	41	Daniel Suárez	Stewart-Haas Racing	Ford	28.704
6	48	Jimmie Johnson	Hendrick Motorsports	Chevrolet	28.724
7	22	Joey Logano	Team Penske	Ford	28.756
8	9	Chase Elliott	Hendrick Motorsports	Chevrolet	28.766
9	11	Denny Hamlin	Joe Gibbs Racing	Toyota	28.787
10	12	Ryan Blaney	Team Penske	Ford	28.801
11	4	Kevin Harvick	Stewart-Haas Racing	Ford	28.812
12	37	Chris Buescher	JTG Daugherty Racing	Chevrolet	28.829
13	14	Clint Bowyer	Stewart-Haas Racing	Ford	28.831
14	3	Austin Dillon	Richard Childress Racing	Chevrolet	28.841
15	20	Erik Jones	Joe Gibbs Racing	Toyota	28.848
16	88	Alex Bowman	Hendrick Motorsports	Chevrolet	28.855
17	21	Paul Menard	Wood Brothers Racing	Ford	28.872
18	8	Daniel Hemric (R)	Richard Childress Racing	Chevrolet	28.892
19	95	Matt DiBenedetto	Leavine Family Racing	Toyota	28.905
20	47	Ryan Preece (R)	JTG Daugherty Racing	Chevrolet	28.910
21	17	Ricky Stenhouse Jr.	Roush Fenway Racing	Ford	28.931
22	19	Martin Truex Jr.	Joe Gibbs Racing	Toyota	28.956
23	34	Michael McDowell	Front Row Motorsports	Ford	29.017
24	6	Ryan Newman	Roush Fenway Racing	Ford	29.019
25	00	Landon Cassill (i)	StarCom Racing	Chevrolet	29.087
26	38	David Ragan	Front Row Motorsports	Ford	29.097
27	32	Corey LaJoie	Go Fas Racing	Ford	29.103
28	43	Bubba Wallace	Richard Petty Motorsports	Chevrolet	29.163
29	13	Ty Dillon	Germain Racing	Chevrolet	29.173
30	10	Aric Almirola	Stewart-Haas Racing	Ford	29.229
31	15	Ross Chastain (i)	Premium Motorsports	Chevrolet	29.239
32	36	Matt Tifft (R)	Front Row Motorsports	Ford	29.272
33	18	Kyle Busch	Joe Gibbs Racing	Toyota	29.385
34	77	Reed Sorenson	Spire Motorsports	Chevrolet	29.764
35	52	J. J. Yeley (i)	Rick Ware Racing	Chevrolet	29.796
36	51	B. J. McLeod (i)	Petty Ware Racing	Chevrolet	30.070
37	27	Joe Nemechek (i)	Premium Motorsports	Chevrolet	30.260
38	54	Garrett Smithley (i)	Rick Ware Racing	Chevrolet	30.568
39	66	Joey Gase (i)	MBM Motorsports	Toyota	30.888
Official qualifying results

== Race ==
=== Stage results ===
Stage One Laps: 100

Pos	No	Driver	Team	Manufacturer	Points
1	1	Kurt Busch	Chip Ganassi Racing	Chevrolet	10
2	48	Jimmie Johnson	Hendrick Motorsports	Chevrolet	9
3	42	Kyle Larson	Chip Ganassi Racing	Chevrolet	8
4	18	Kyle Busch	Joe Gibbs Racing	Toyota	7
5	11	Denny Hamlin	Joe Gibbs Racing	Toyota	6
6	9	Chase Elliott	Hendrick Motorsports	Chevrolet	5
7	2	Brad Keselowski	Team Penske	Ford	4
8	22	Joey Logano	Team Penske	Ford	3
9	19	Martin Truex Jr.	Joe Gibbs Racing	Toyota	2
10	20	Erik Jones	Joe Gibbs Racing	Toyota	1
Official stage one results

Stage Two Laps: 100

Pos	No	Driver	Team	Manufacturer	Points
1	18	Kyle Busch	Joe Gibbs Racing	Toyota	10
2	1	Kurt Busch	Chip Ganassi Racing	Chevrolet	9
3	11	Denny Hamlin	Joe Gibbs Racing	Toyota	8
4	20	Erik Jones	Joe Gibbs Racing	Toyota	7
5	42	Kyle Larson	Chip Ganassi Racing	Chevrolet	6
6	14	Clint Bowyer	Stewart-Haas Racing	Ford	5
7	48	Jimmie Johnson	Hendrick Motorsports	Chevrolet	4
8	24	William Byron	Hendrick Motorsports	Chevrolet	3
9	2	Brad Keselowski	Team Penske	Ford	2
10	4	Kevin Harvick	Stewart-Haas Racing	Ford	1
Official stage two results

=== Final stage results ===
Stage Three Laps: 167

Pos	Grid	No	Driver	Team	Manufacturer	Laps	Points
1	15	20	Erik Jones	Joe Gibbs Racing	Toyota	367	48
2	3	42	Kyle Larson	Chip Ganassi Racing	Chevrolet	367	49
3	33	18	Kyle Busch	Joe Gibbs Racing	Toyota	367	51
4	11	4	Kevin Harvick	Stewart-Haas Racing	Ford	367	34
5	2	2	Brad Keselowski	Team Penske	Ford	367	38
6	13	14	Clint Bowyer	Stewart-Haas Racing	Ford	367	36
7	4	1	Kurt Busch	Chip Ganassi Racing	Chevrolet	367	49
8	19	95	Matt DiBenedetto	Leavine Family Racing	Toyota	367	29
9	17	21	Paul Menard	Wood Brothers Racing	Ford	367	28
10	14	3	Austin Dillon	Richard Childress Racing	Chevrolet	367	27
11	5	41	Daniel Suárez	Stewart-Haas Racing	Ford	367	26
12	12	37	Chris Buescher	JTG Daugherty Racing	Chevrolet	367	25
13	10	12	Ryan Blaney	Team Penske	Ford	366	24
14	7	22	Joey Logano	Team Penske	Ford	366	26
15	22	19	Martin Truex Jr.	Joe Gibbs Racing	Toyota	366	24
16	6	48	Jimmie Johnson	Hendrick Motorsports	Chevrolet	366	34
17	30	10	Aric Almirola	Stewart-Haas Racing	Ford	366	20
18	16	88	Alex Bowman	Hendrick Motorsports	Chevrolet	365	19
19	8	9	Chase Elliott	Hendrick Motorsports	Chevrolet	365	23
20	29	13	Ty Dillon	Germain Racing	Chevrolet	365	17
21	1	24	William Byron	Hendrick Motorsports	Chevrolet	365	19
22	20	47	Ryan Preece (R)	JTG Daugherty Racing	Chevrolet	365	15
23	24	6	Ryan Newman	Roush Fenway Racing	Ford	365	14
24	28	43	Bubba Wallace	Richard Petty Motorsports	Chevrolet	365	13
25	25	00	Landon Cassill (i)	StarCom Racing	Chevrolet	364	0
26	26	38	David Ragan	Front Row Motorsports	Ford	363	11
27	32	36	Matt Tifft (R)	Front Row Motorsports	Ford	362	10
28	31	15	Ross Chastain (i)	Premium Motorsports	Chevrolet	361	0
29	9	11	Denny Hamlin	Joe Gibbs Racing	Toyota	356	22
30	34	77	Reed Sorenson	Spire Motorsports	Chevrolet	355	7
31	37	27	Joe Nemechek (i)	Premium Motorsports	Chevrolet	354	0
32	35	52	J. J. Yeley (i)	Rick Ware Racing	Chevrolet	352	0
33	21	17	Ricky Stenhouse Jr.	Roush Fenway Racing	Ford	351	4
34	39	66	Joey Gase (i)	MBM Motorsports	Toyota	349	0
35	38	54	Garrett Smithley (i)	Rick Ware Racing	CHevrolet	344	0
36	27	32	Corey LaJoie	Go Fas Racing	Ford	330	1
37	18	8	Daniel Hemric (R)	Richard Childress Racing	Chevrolet	274	1
38	23	34	Michael McDowell	Front Row Motorsports	Ford	274	1
39	36	51	B. J. McLeod (i)	Petty Ware Racing	Chevrolet	194	0
Official race results

=== Race statistics ===
- Lead changes: 13 among 8 different drivers
- Cautions/Laps: 7 for 35
- Red flags: 0
- Time of race: 3 hours, 44 minutes and 46 seconds
- Average speed: 133.825 miles per hour (215.370 km/h)

== Media ==
=== Television ===
NBC Sports covered the race on the television side. Rick Allen, two–time Darlington winner Jeff Burton, Steve Letarte and Dale Earnhardt Jr. were in the booth to call the race. Dave Burns, Marty Snider and Kelli Stavast reported from pit lane during the race. Earnhardt Jr., Dale Jarrett and Kyle Petty also called a portion of the race as part of the Throwback Weekend.

NBCSN
Booth announcers	Pit reporters
Lap-by-lap: Rick Allen; Color-commentator: Jeff Burton; Color-commentator: Steve Letarte; Color-commentator: Dale Earnhardt Jr. Throwback commentator: Dale Jarrett; Throwback commentator: Kyle Petty	Dave Burns; Marty Snider; Kelli Stavast

=== Radio ===
The Motor Racing Network (MRN) called the race for radio, which was simulcast on Sirius XM NASCAR Radio. Alex Hayden, Jeff Striegle, and Rusty Wallace called the action for MRN when the field raced down the front stretch. Dave Moody called the race from a Billboard outside of turn 1 when the field raced through turns 1 and 2, and Mike Bagley called the race atop of the Darlington Raceway Club outside of turn 3 when the field raced through turns 3 and 4. Winston Kelley, Steve Post, and Kim Coon called the action on pit road for MRN.

MRN
Booth announcers	Turn announcers	Pit reporters
Lead announcer: Alex Hayden; Announcer: Jeff Striegle; Announcer: Rusty Wallace	Turns 1 & 2: Dave Moody; Turns 3 & 4: Mike Bagley	Winston Kelley; Steve Post; Kim Coon

== Standings after the race ==
Drivers' Championship standings

	Pos	Driver	Points
	1	Kyle Busch	983
	2	Joey Logano	919 (–64)
	3	Denny Hamlin	877 (–106)
1	4	Kevin Harvick	864 (–119)
1	5	Martin Truex Jr.	862 (–121)
	6	Brad Keselowski	832 (–151)
1	7	Kurt Busch	790 (–193)
1	8	Chase Elliott	780 (–203)
2	9	Kyle Larson	714 (–269)
1	10	Ryan Blaney	710 (–273)
1	11	Alex Bowman	694 (–289)
2	12	Erik Jones	694 (–289)
1	13	William Byron	683 (–300)
1	14	Aric Almirola	674 (–309)
2	15	Clint Bowyer	625 (–358)
	16	Daniel Suárez	617 (–366)
Official driver's standings

Manufacturers' Championship standings

Pos	Manufacturer	Points
1	Toyota	917
2	Ford	883 (–34)
3	Chevrolet	849 (–68)

- Note: Only the first 16 positions are included for the driver standings.
- . – Driver has clinched a position in the Monster Energy NASCAR Cup Series playoffs.

Previous race: 2019 Bass Pro Shops NRA Night Race	Monster Energy NASCAR Cup Series; 2019 season	Next race: 2019 Brickyard 400
