= 2005 Pennsylvania 500 =

Race details
- Race 20 of 36 in the 2005 NASCAR Nextel Cup Series
- The 2005 Pennsylvania 500 program cover, featuring Rusty Wallace and Mark Martin.
- Date: July 24, 2005
- Official name: 32nd Annual Pennsylvania 500
- Location: Long Pond, Pennsylvania, Pocono Raceway
- Course: Permanent racing facility
- Course length: 4.0 km (2.5 miles)
- Distance: 203 laps, 816.742 mi (816.742 km)
- Scheduled distance: 200 laps, 500 mi (804.672 km)
- Average speed: 125.283 miles per hour (201.623 km/h)
- Attendance: 100,000

Pole position
Driver	Jamie McMurray	Chip Ganassi Racing with Felix Sabates
- Time: 53.330

Most laps led
Driver	Kurt Busch	Roush Racing
- Laps: 131

Winner
No. 97	Kurt Busch	Roush Racing

Television in the United States
- Network: TNT
- Announcers: Bill Weber, Benny Parsons, Wally Dallenbach Jr.

Radio in the United States
- Radio: Motor Racing Network

The 2005 Pennsylvania 500 was the 20th stock car racing race of the 2005 NASCAR Nextel Cup Series season and the 32nd iteration of the event. The race was held on Sunday, July 24, 2005, before a crowd of 100,000 in Long Pond, Pennsylvania, at Pocono Raceway, a 2.5 miles (4.0 km) triangular permanent course. The race was extended from 200 laps to 203 due to a green–white–checker finish caused by Michael Waltrip spinning with two to go. The race would end under caution, with Kurt Busch of Roush Racing pulling ahead of Rusty Wallace of Penske Racing when the caution came out due to Kasey Kahne hitting the wall on the final lap. The race would be Busch's 13th NASCAR Nextel Cup Series win of his career and his second of the season. To fill out the podium, Mark Martin of Roush Racing would finish third.

== Background ==
The layout of Pocono Raceway, the venue where the race was held.

The race was held at Pocono Raceway, which is a three-turn superspeedway located in Long Pond, Pennsylvania. The track hosts two annual NASCAR Sprint Cup Series races, as well as one Xfinity Series and Camping World Truck Series event. Until 2019, the track also hosted an IndyCar Series race.

Pocono Raceway is one of a very few NASCAR tracks not owned by either Speedway Motorsports, Inc. or International Speedway Corporation. It is operated by the Igdalsky siblings Brandon, Nicholas, and sister Ashley, and cousins Joseph IV and Chase Mattioli, all of whom are third-generation members of the family-owned Mattco Inc, started by Joseph II and Rose Mattioli.

Outside of the NASCAR races, the track is used throughout the year by Sports Car Club of America (SCCA) and motorcycle clubs as well as racing schools and an IndyCar race. The triangular oval also has three separate infield sections of racetrack – North Course, East Course and South Course. Each of these infield sections use a separate portion of the tri-oval to complete the track. During regular non-race weekends, multiple clubs can use the track by running on different infield sections. Also some of the infield sections can be run in either direction, or multiple infield sections can be put together – such as running the North Course and the South Course and using the tri-oval to connect the two.

=== Entry list ===
#	Driver	Team	Make	Sponsor
0	Mike Bliss	Haas CNC Racing	Chevrolet	NetZero, Best Buy
00	Carl Long	McGlynn Racing	Chevrolet	Champion Builders, Sundance Vacations
01	Joe Nemechek	MB2 Motorsports	Chevrolet	U. S. Army
2	Rusty Wallace	Penske Racing	Dodge	Miller Lite
4	Mike Wallace	Morgan–McClure Motorsports	Chevrolet	Lucas Oil, Wide Open Energy Drink
5	Kyle Busch	Hendrick Motorsports	Chevrolet	Kellogg's
6	Mark Martin	Roush Racing	Ford	Viagra
7	Robby Gordon	Robby Gordon Motorsports	Chevrolet	Jim Bean
07	Dave Blaney	Richard Childress Racing	Chevrolet	Jack Daniel's
8	Dale Earnhardt Jr.	Dale Earnhardt, Inc.	Chevrolet	Budweiser
9	Kasey Kahne	Evernham Motorsports	Dodge	Dodge Dealers, UAW
10	Scott Riggs	MBV Motorsports	Chevrolet	Valvoline
11	Jason Leffler	Joe Gibbs Racing	Chevrolet	FedEx Ground
12	Ryan Newman	Penske Racing	Dodge	Mobil 1, Speedpass
13	Greg Sacks	Sacks Motorsports	Dodge	Sacks Motorsports
15	Michael Waltrip	Dale Earnhardt, Inc.	Chevrolet	NAPA Auto Parts
16	Greg Biffle	Roush Racing	Ford	Post-it Notes, National Guard
17	Matt Kenseth	Roush Racing	Ford	DeWalt
18	Bobby Labonte	Joe Gibbs Racing	Chevrolet	Interstate Batteries
19	Jeremy Mayfield	Evernham Motorsports	Dodge	Dodge Dealers, UAW
20	Tony Stewart	Joe Gibbs Racing	Chevrolet	The Home Depot
21	Ricky Rudd	Wood Brothers Racing	Ford	Motorcraft Genuine Parts
22	Scott Wimmer	Bill Davis Racing	Dodge	Caterpillar
24	Jeff Gordon	Hendrick Motorsports	Chevrolet	DuPont
25	Brian Vickers	Hendrick Motorsports	Chevrolet	ditech.com, GMAC
27	Kirk Shelmerdine	Kirk Shelmerdine Racing	Ford	L. R. Lyon & Sons, Salem RV
29	Kevin Harvick	Richard Childress Racing	Chevrolet	GM Goodwrench
31	Jeff Burton	Richard Childress Racing	Chevrolet	Cingular Wireless
32	Bobby Hamilton Jr.	PPI Motorsports	Chevrolet	Tide
34	P. J. Jones	Mach 1 Motorsports	Chevrolet	Mach One Inc.
37	Kevin Lepage	R&J Racing	Dodge	BOSpoker
38	Elliott Sadler	Robert Yates Racing	Ford	M&M's
40	Sterling Marlin	Chip Ganassi Racing with Felix Sabates	Dodge	Coors Light
41	Casey Mears	Chip Ganassi Racing with Felix Sabates	Dodge	Target
42	Jamie McMurray	Chip Ganassi Racing with Felix Sabates	Dodge	Texaco, Havoline
43	Jeff Green	Petty Enterprises	Dodge	Cheerios, Betty Crocker
45	Kyle Petty	Petty Enterprises	Dodge	Chick-fil-A, Kyle Petty Charity Ride Across America
48	Jimmie Johnson	Hendrick Motorsports	Chevrolet	Lowe's
49	Ken Schrader	BAM Racing	Dodge	Schwan's Home Service
52	Derrike Cope	Rick Ware Racing	Dodge	Pro30, Sugar Hollow Farms
66	Mike Garvey	Peak Fitness Racing	Ford	Peak Fitness
77	Travis Kvapil	Penske Racing	Dodge	Kodak, Jasper Engines & Transmissions
88	Dale Jarrett	Robert Yates Racing	Ford	UPS
89	Morgan Shepherd	Shepherd Racing Ventures	Dodge	Cornerstone Bancard, Victory in Jesus
92	Hermie Sadler	Front Row Motorsports	Chevrolet	Front Row Motorsports
97	Kurt Busch	Roush Racing	Ford	Irwin Industrial Tools
99	Carl Edwards	Roush Racing	Ford	Office Depot
Official entry list

== Practice ==
=== First practice ===
The first practice session would occur on Friday, July 22, at 1:20 PM EST, and would last for one hour and 20 minutes. Ryan Newman of Penske Racing would set the fastest time in the session, with a lap of 54.007 and an average speed of 166.645 miles per hour (268.189 km/h).

Pos.	#	Driver	Team	Make	Time	Speed
1	12	Ryan Newman	Penske Racing	Dodge	54.007	166.645
2	25	Brian Vickers	Hendrick Motorsports	Chevrolet	54.218	165.997
3	01	Joe Nemechek	MB2 Motorsports	Chevrolet	54.454	165.277
Full first practice results

=== Second and final practice ===
The second and final practice session would occur on Friday, July 22, at 4:00 PM EST, and would last for one hour and 15 minutes. Ryan Newman of Penske Racing would set the fastest time in the session, with a lap of 54.213 and an average speed of 166.012 miles per hour (267.170 km/h).

Pos.	#	Driver	Team	Make	Time	Speed
1	12	Ryan Newman	Penske Racing	Dodge	54.213	166.012
2	15	Michael Waltrip	Dale Earnhardt, Inc.	Chevrolet	54.272	165.831
3	40	Sterling Marlin	Chip Ganassi Racing with Felix Sabates	Dodge	54.304	165.734
Full final practice results

== Qualifying ==
Qualifying would take place on Saturday, July 23, at 12:10 PM EST. Each driver would have two laps to set a fastest time; the fastest of the two would count as their official qualifying lap.

Jamie McMurray of Chip Ganassi Racing with Felix Sabates would win the pole, with a lap of 53.330 and an average speed of 168.761 miles per hour (271.595 km/h).

Two incidents would occur in qualifying: first, Derrike Cope would hit the wall in Turn 2, then in Turn 3 during his first lap, causing Cope to not set a lap time. Then, Carl Long would spin in Turn 1 and hit the wall during his first lap, causing him to also not set a lap time.

Four drivers would fail to qualify: Morgan Shepherd, Hermie Sadler, Carl Long, and Derrike Cope.

=== Full qualifying results ===
Pos.	#	Driver	Team	Make	Time	Speed
1	42	Jamie McMurray	Chip Ganassi Racing with Felix Sabates	Dodge	53.330	168.761
2	97	Kurt Busch	Roush Racing	Ford	53.402	168.533
3	6	Mark Martin	Roush Racing	Ford	53.450	168.382
4	12	Ryan Newman	Penske Racing	Dodge	53.492	168.249
5	21	Ricky Rudd	Wood Brothers Racing	Ford	53.617	167.857
6	20	Tony Stewart	Joe Gibbs Racing	Chevrolet	53.721	167.532
7	16	Greg Biffle	Roush Racing	Ford	53.818	167.230
8	25	Brian Vickers	Hendrick Motorsports	Chevrolet	53.818	167.230
9	48	Jimmie Johnson	Hendrick Motorsports	Chevrolet	53.869	167.072
10	29	Kevin Harvick	Richard Childress Racing	Chevrolet	53.869	167.072
11	22	Scott Wimmer	Bill Davis Racing	Dodge	53.921	166.911
12	49	Ken Schrader	BAM Racing	Dodge	53.985	166.713
13	2	Rusty Wallace	Penske Racing	Dodge	54.027	166.583
14	01	Joe Nemechek	MB2 Motorsports	Chevrolet	54.063	166.472
15	9	Kasey Kahne	Evernham Motorsports	Dodge	54.146	166.217
16	19	Jeremy Mayfield	Evernham Motorsports	Dodge	54.153	166.196
17	31	Jeff Burton	Richard Childress Racing	Chevrolet	54.224	165.978
18	10	Scott Riggs	MBV Motorsports	Chevrolet	54.233	165.951
19	11	Jason Leffler	Joe Gibbs Racing	Chevrolet	54.265	165.853
20	88	Dale Jarrett	Robert Yates Racing	Ford	54.282	165.801
21	24	Jeff Gordon	Hendrick Motorsports	Chevrolet	54.298	165.752
22	07	Dave Blaney	Richard Childress Racing	Chevrolet	54.324	165.673
23	18	Bobby Labonte	Joe Gibbs Racing	Chevrolet	54.347	165.603
24	15	Michael Waltrip	Dale Earnhardt, Inc.	Chevrolet	54.470	165.229
25	40	Sterling Marlin	Chip Ganassi Racing with Felix Sabates	Dodge	54.521	165.074
26	43	Jeff Green	Petty Enterprises	Dodge	54.561	164.953
27	32	Bobby Hamilton Jr.	PPI Motorsports	Chevrolet	54.621	164.772
28	5	Kyle Busch	Hendrick Motorsports	Chevrolet	54.645	164.699
29	7	Robby Gordon	Robby Gordon Motorsports	Chevrolet	54.645	164.699
30	17	Matt Kenseth	Roush Racing	Ford	57.711	164.501
31	4	Mike Wallace	Morgan–McClure Motorsports	Chevrolet	54.854	164.072
32	66	Mike Garvey	Peak Fitness Racing	Ford	54.858	164.060
33	45	Kyle Petty	Petty Enterprises	Dodge	54.954	163.773
34	0	Mike Bliss	Haas CNC Racing	Chevrolet	55.058	163.464
35	13	Greg Sacks	Sacks Motorsports	Dodge	55.063	163.449
36	34	P. J. Jones	Mach 1 Motorsports	Chevrolet	55.091	163.366
37	37	Kevin Lepage	R&J Racing	Dodge	55.132	163.245
Qualified on owner's points
38	8	Dale Earnhardt Jr.	Dale Earnhardt, Inc.	Chevrolet	55.375	162.528
39	38	Elliott Sadler	Robert Yates Racing	Ford	55.567	161.705
40	77	Travis Kvapil	Penske Racing	Dodge	55.967	160.809
41	99	Bobby Gerhart*	Roush Racing	Ford	56.466	159.388
42	41	Casey Mears	Chip Ganassi Racing with Felix Sabates	Dodge	60.488	148.790
Last car to qualify on time
43	27	Kirk Shelmerdine	Kirk Shelmerdine Racing	Ford	55.154	163.179
Failed to qualify
44	89	Morgan Shepherd	Shepherd Racing Ventures	Dodge	55.330	162.660
45	92	Hermie Sadler	Front Row Motorsports	Chevrolet	56.199	160.145
46	00	Carl Long	McGlynn Racing	Chevrolet	—	—
47	52	Derrike Cope	Rick Ware Racing	Dodge	—	—
Official qualifying results

*Gerhart would qualify for Carl Edwards, as Edwards would later race in the day's NASCAR Busch Grand National Series race.

== Race results ==
Fin	St	#	Driver	Team	Make	Laps	Led	Status	Pts	Winnings
1	2	97	Kurt Busch	Roush Racing	Ford	203	131	running	190	$261,275
2	13	2	Rusty Wallace	Penske Racing	Dodge	203	18	running	175	$178.858
3	3	6	Mark Martin	Roush Racing	Ford	203	26	running	170	$134,400
4	41	99	Carl Edwards	Roush Racing	Ford	203	0	running	160	$125,900
5	4	12	Ryan Newman	Penske Racing	Dodge	203	1	running	160	$133,066
6	10	29	Kevin Harvick	Richard Childress Racing	Chevrolet	203	0	running	150	$131,661
7	6	20	Tony Stewart	Joe Gibbs Racing	Chevrolet	203	0	running	146	$125,336
8	23	18	Bobby Labonte	Joe Gibbs Racing	Chevrolet	203	0	running	142	$112,250
9	34	0	Mike Bliss	Haas CNC Racing	Chevrolet	203	0	running	138	$77,925
10	5	21	Ricky Rudd	Wood Brothers Racing	Ford	203	0	running	134	$103,489
11	1	42	Jamie McMurray	Chip Ganassi Racing with Felix Sabates	Dodge	203	0	running	130	$90,500
12	9	48	Jimmie Johnson	Hendrick Motorsports	Chevrolet	203	0	running	127	$115,566
13	21	24	Jeff Gordon	Hendrick Motorsports	Chevrolet	203	0	running	124	$115,411
14	8	25	Brian Vickers	Hendrick Motorsports	Chevrolet	203	0	running	121	$76,725
15	20	88	Dale Jarrett	Robert Yates Racing	Ford	203	0	running	118	$103,183
16	39	38	Elliott Sadler	Robert Yates Racing	Ford	203	0	running	115	$103,116
17	7	16	Greg Biffle	Roush Racing	Ford	203	17	running	117	$81,325
18	16	19	Jeremy Mayfield	Evernham Motorsports	Dodge	203	0	running	109	$94,270
19	26	43	Jeff Green	Petty Enterprises	Dodge	203	0	running	106	$95,211
20	22	07	Dave Blaney	Richard Childress Racing	Chevrolet	203	0	running	103	$76,000
21	42	41	Casey Mears	Chip Ganassi Racing with Felix Sabates	Dodge	203	0	running	100	$91,788
22	14	01	Joe Nemechek	MB2 Motorsports	Chevrolet	203	8	running	102	$89,483
23	27	32	Bobby Hamilton Jr.	PPI Motorsports	Chevrolet	203	0	running	94	$80,083
24	19	11	Jason Leffler	Joe Gibbs Racing	Chevrolet	203	0	running	91	$64,750
25	11	22	Scott Wimmer	Bill Davis Racing	Dodge	203	0	running	88	$84,483
26	24	15	Michael Waltrip	Dale Earnhardt, Inc.	Chevrolet	203	0	running	85	$91,389
27	15	9	Kasey Kahne	Evernham Motorsports	Dodge	202	0	running	82	$96,000
28	25	40	Sterling Marlin	Chip Ganassi Racing with Felix Sabates	Dodge	202	0	running	79	$91,683
29	31	4	Mike Wallace	Morgan–McClure Motorsports	Chevrolet	202	1	running	81	$63,125
30	33	45	Kyle Petty	Petty Enterprises	Dodge	202	0	running	73	$70,522
31	12	49	Ken Schrader	BAM Racing	Dodge	202	0	running	70	$60,325
32	38	8	Dale Earnhardt Jr.	Dale Earnhardt, Inc.	Chevrolet	201	0	running	67	$107,583
33	18	10	Scott Riggs	MBV Motorsports	Chevrolet	201	0	running	64	$68,925
34	32	66	Mike Garvey	Peak Fitness Racing	Ford	201	0	running	61	$61,275
35	37	37	Kevin Lepage	R&J Racing	Dodge	201	0	running	58	$59,625
36	30	17	Matt Kenseth	Roush Racing	Ford	195	0	running	55	$107,341
37	17	31	Jeff Burton	Richard Childress Racing	Chevrolet	192	0	running	52	$85,570
38	40	77	Travis Kvapil	Penske Racing	Dodge	179	0	running	49	$67,100
39	28	5	Kyle Busch	Hendrick Motorsports	Chevrolet	150	0	crash	46	$66,975
40	29	7	Robby Gordon	Robby Gordon Motorsports	Chevrolet	143	0	engine	43	$58,825
41	36	34	P. J. Jones	Mach 1 Motorsports	Chevrolet	23	1	transmission	45	$58,685
42	43	27	Kirk Shelmerdine	Kirk Shelmerdine Racing	Ford	11	0	overheating	37	$58,535
43	35	13	Greg Sacks	Sacks Motorsports	Dodge	5	0	brakes	34	$58,394
Failed to qualify
44		89	Morgan Shepherd	Shepherd Racing Ventures	Dodge					
45		92	Hermie Sadler	Front Row Motorsports	Chevrolet					
46		00	Carl Long	McGlynn Racing	Chevrolet					
47		52	Derrike Cope	Rick Ware Racing	Dodge					
Official race results

Previous race: 2005 New England 300	NASCAR Nextel Cup Series; 2005 season	Next race: 2005 Brickyard 400
