= Kyle Petty =

American racing driver (born 1960)

- Petty at Las Vegas Motor Speedway in 2026
- Born: Kyle Eugene Petty; June 2, 1960 (age 66); Randleman, North Carolina, U.S.
- Achievements: 1987 Coca-Cola 600 Winner
- Awards: 1999, 2000 NASCAR Illustrated Person of the Year; 2000, 2004 National Motorsports Press Association Myers Brothers Award; 2000 National Motorsports Press Association Pocono Spirt Award; 2010 Little League Hall of Excellence

NASCAR Cup Series career
- 829 races run over 30 years
- Best finish: 5th (1992, 1993)
- First race: 1979 Talladega 500 (Talladega)
- Last race: 2008 Checker O'Reilly Auto Parts 500 (Phoenix)
- First win: 1986 Miller High Life 400 (Richmond)
- Last win: 1995 Miller Genuine Draft 500 (Dover)
Wins	Top tens	Poles
8	173	8

NASCAR O'Reilly Auto Parts Series career
- 55 races run over 10 years
- Best finish: 21st (1986)
- First race: 1982 Kroger 200 (IRP)
- Last race: 2000 Miami 300 (Homestead)
Wins	Top tens	Poles
0	11	0

NASCAR FedEx Freight Truck Series career
- 1 race run over 1 year
- Best finish: 100th (1997)
- First race: 1997 The No Fear Challenge (California)
Wins	Top tens	Poles
0	0	0
- Statistics up to date as of September 24, 2017.

Kyle Eugene Petty (born June 2, 1960) is an American former stock car racing driver and current racing commentator. He is the son of racer Richard Petty, grandson of racer Lee Petty, and father of racer Adam Petty, who was killed in a crash during practice in May 2000. Petty last drove the No. 45 Dodge Charger for Petty Enterprises, where he was CEO; his last race was in 2008. He is also an active philanthropist and has run the Kyle Petty Charity Ride Across America since 1995.

== Early life and career ==
Petty was born in Randleman, North Carolina to his parents Lynda and Richard Petty. Petty is a third generation NASCAR driver his grandfather, Lee Petty, won the first Daytona 500 in 1959 and was also a three-time NASCAR champion. His father Richard is a seven-time NASCAR champion. He has three younger sisters. Petty graduated from Randleman High School where he was a notable quarterback and basketball player even being offered scholarships to play in college however he turned them down to pursue racing. He was later inducted into the schools Hall of Fame in 2016.

Petty also played Little League Baseball growing up and in 2010 he was inducted into the Little League Hall of Excellence, the highest honor Little League can bestow.

He made his major-league stock car debut at the age of eighteen. He won the first race he entered, the 1979 Daytona ARCA 200, in one of his father's old 1978 Dodge Magnum race cars. At the time, Petty became the youngest driver to win a major-league stock car race.

== NASCAR career ==
=== 1979–1984 ===
Petty made his Winston Cup Series debut, again driving a passed down STP Dodge Magnum numbered No. 42 (a number used by his grandfather Lee Petty) for his family's team. He ran five races and had a ninth-place finish in his first series race, the 1979 Talladega 500. In 1980, he made a total of fifteen starts in the No. 42 (after crashing the last of his father's Dodge Magnums in one of the Daytona 125 qualifying races) and had six top-ten finishes, garnering a twenty-eighth-place points finish. He began the 1981 season driving his father's No. 43 for one race, before running a full schedule in his regular No. 42, finishing in the top-ten ten times and finishing twelfth in points.

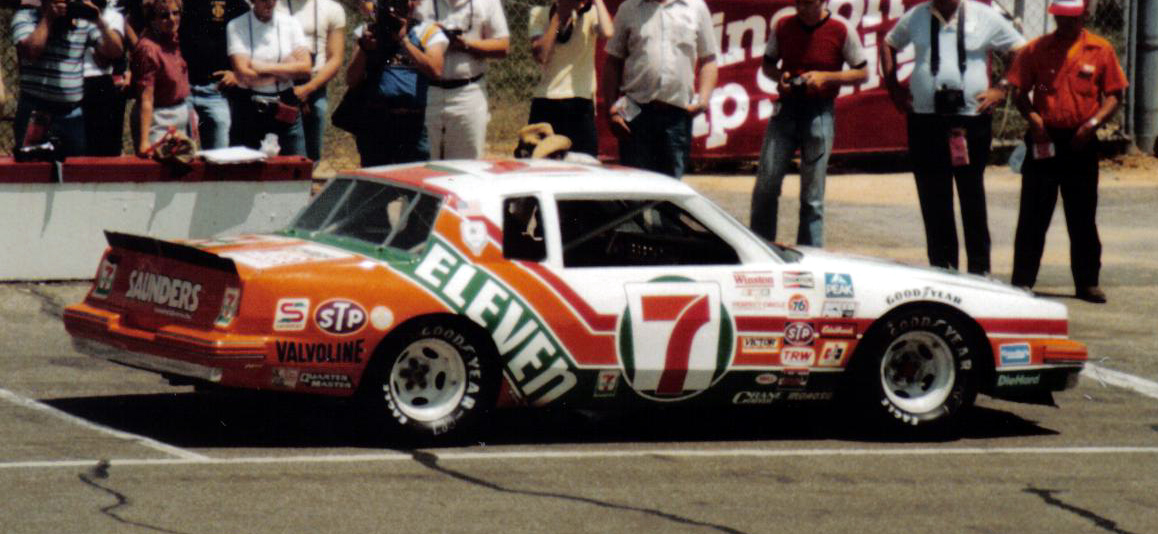
Kyle Petty's 1983 Pontiac Grand Prix

Petty began the 1982 season with two top-ten finishes, but later began splitting time between his No. 42 and the No. 1 UNO/STP car owned by Hoss Ellington, and ended the season fifteenth in points. In 1983, he picked up funding from 7-Eleven and accordingly switched his number to 7. He had only two top-ten finishes but improved to thirteenth in the standings. He followed that season up with six top-tens the following year, but fell three spots in points.

=== 1985–1996 ===
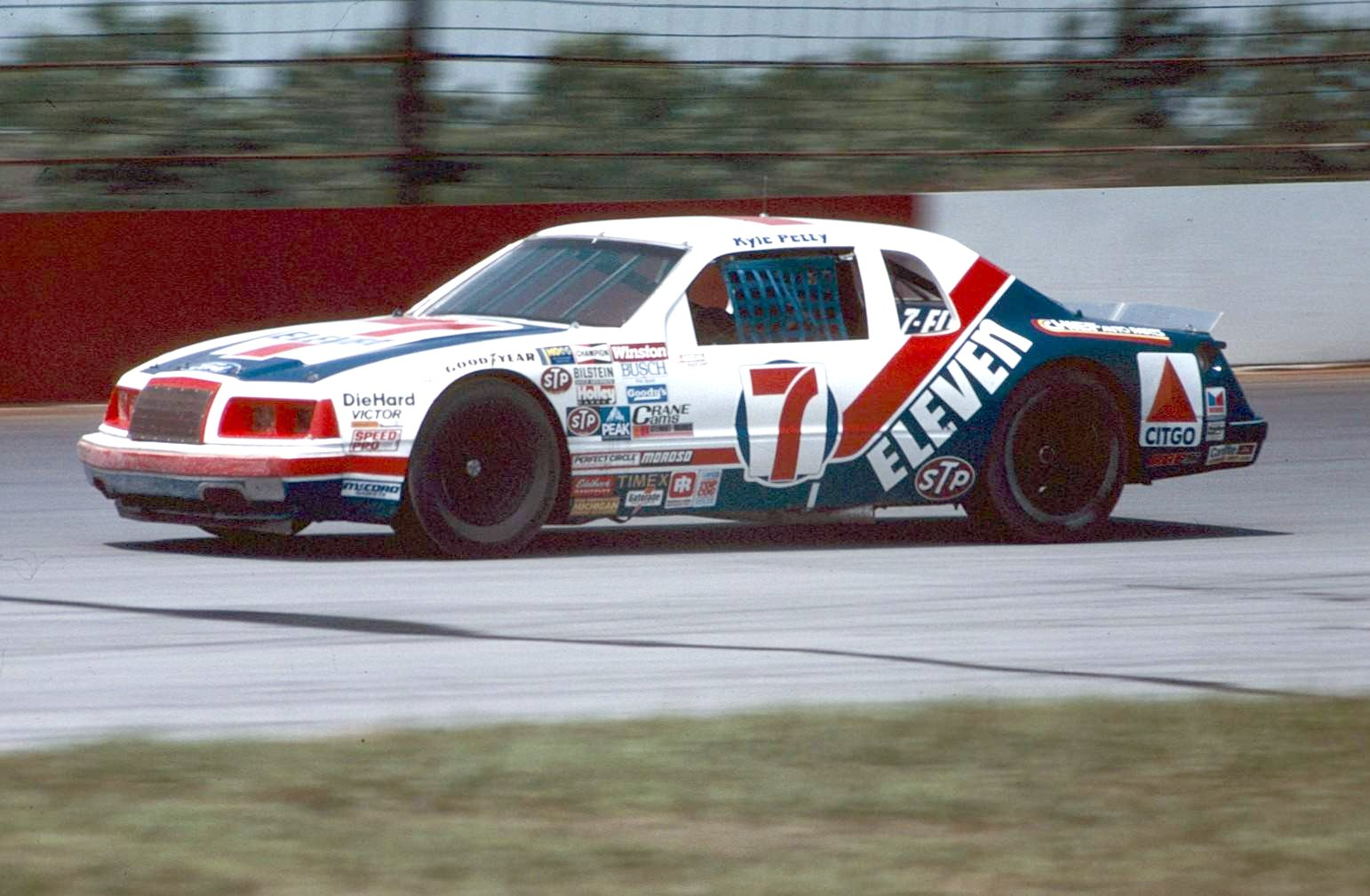
Petty's 1985 car

Petty took his number and sponsorship to Wood Brothers Racing in 1985, where he had a then career-high seven top-fives and his first top-ten points finish. The next season, he won his first career race in the infamous 1986 Miller High Life 400 at Richmond and finished tenth in the final standings. In 1987, he switched to the No. 21 and received new sponsorship from Citgo, as well as winning the 1987 Coca-Cola 600 at Charlotte. He failed to pick up a win in 1988, and fell to thirteenth in points, causing him to be released from the ride. He competed in the first NASCAR race held outside North America, the 1988 Goodyear NASCAR 500 at the Calder Park Thunderdome in Australia, where he finished tenth.

Petty signed on to a part-time schedule in 1989 for the new SABCO Racing team. Originally beginning the season unsponsored, he and SABCO later picked up sponsorship from Peak Antifreeze after he drove their car to a top-ten finish at the Daytona 500, filling in for Eddie Bierschwale, as well as Ames Department Stores. Petty and the No. 42 Pontiac team competed in nineteen races that season, his best finish being a fourth at Atlanta. Peak became the team's full-time sponsor in 1990, and Petty finished eleventh in points after winning the GM Goodwrench 500 at North Carolina Speedway with a 26-second margin of victory. Mello Yello would replace Peak as sponsor of the No. 42 in 1991, and Petty was running eleventh in points when he suffered a broken leg at a crash in the Winston 500 at Talladega, causing him to miss the next eleven races. His abbreviated schedule combined with only one top-ten in the second half of the season caused him to finish the season 31st in points.

In 1992, Petty rebounded to a career-best fifth-place finish in points, as well winning two separate races that season at Watkins Glen and Rockingham. The 1992 season would be the only year that he would win multiple races in a single season. Kyle came very close to winning the championship in 1992, he had a flat tire at Phoenix (2nd to last race) and broke an engine in the last race otherwise he would have been neck and neck with Elliott and Kulwicki for the title. He duplicated his points finish in 1993 as well as picking up a win in the Champion Spark Plug 500 at Pocono. He dropped ten spots in points in 1994 after he failed to finish higher than fourth, and lost the Mello Yello sponsorship at the end of the season. Coors Light became his new sponsor beginning in 1995, and Kyle won his final career Cup race in the Miller Genuine Draft 500 at Dover. He fell further down to thirtieth in points after only finishing in the top-ten five times and failing to qualify for the fall race at Bristol Motor Speedway. He improved to a 27th place points finish the next season despite missing two races due to injury and failing to qualify for the season-ending race at Atlanta. He parted ways with SABCO at the end of the season. In 1996, the popular rock group Soundgarden recorded a song called "Kyle Petty, Son of Richard."

=== 1997–2006 ===
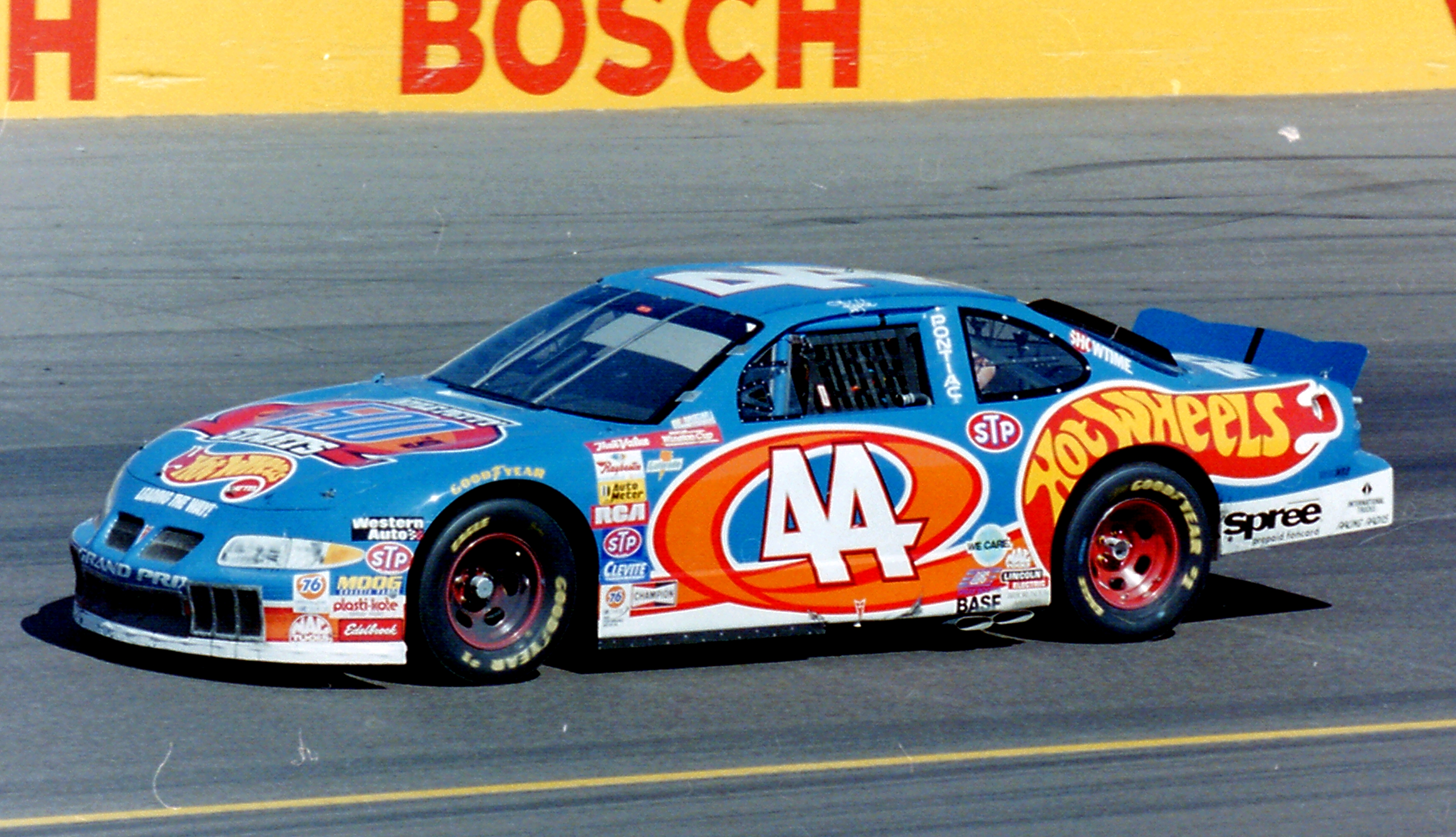
Petty made his 500th Cup start at Phoenix International Raceway in 1997

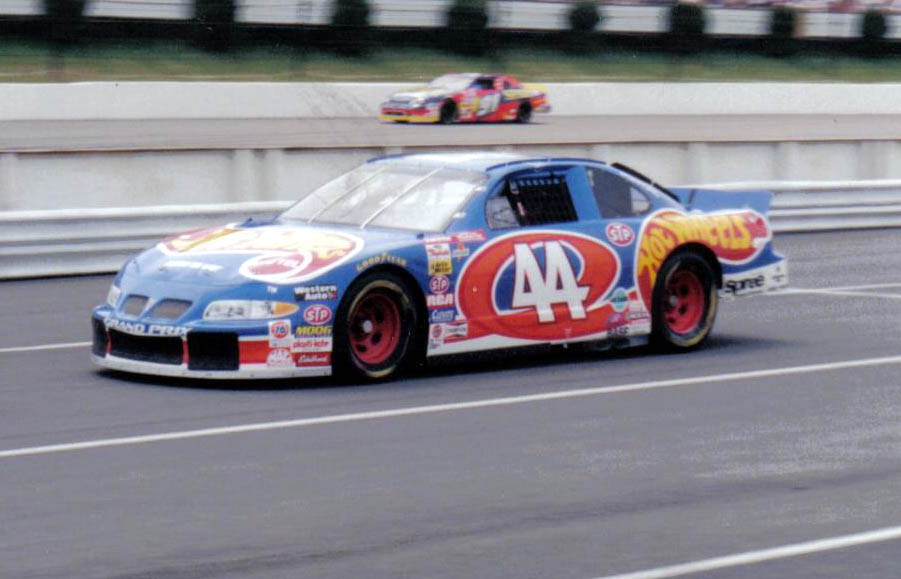
The 44 car in 1997

Beginning with the 1997 season, Petty formed his own team, PE2 Motorsports, and fielded the No. 44 Hot Wheels Pontiac Grand Prix for himself. He had two top-five finishes and nine top-ten finishes, and finished fifteenth in points, the highest points placement of all the new teams to run during the 1997 season. He only had two top-tens in 1998, and fell back to 30th in points, causing him to return to Petty Enterprises and run his team from their shop, and became Petty Enterprises' new CEO. He began the 1999 season with two early DNQs, and finished 26th in points despite finishing in the top-ten nine times. Petty also made guest appearances on ESPN to provide commentary during Busch Series races. He had one top-ten early in 2000, the same year in which his son Adam died while practicing for a Busch Series race at New Hampshire International Speedway. He missed the next two races and returned to drive the No. 44 for the rest of the summer, before moving to the Busch Series full-time to finish out the season in Adam's No. 45 Sprint Chevrolet. He had four top-tens in the car over a span of fourteen races, and attempted two Cup races with the No. 45 Sprint PCS Chevrolet in 2000, finishing 31st at Martinsville. He also filled in at the Brickyard 400 for Penske Racing after their regular driver, Jeremy Mayfield, had to miss the race due to a concussion, Petty finished 32nd. Steve Grissom drove the No. 44 Hot Wheels Pontiac for the rest of the 2000 Winston Cup season and qualified 5 races in 2000. Petty had to drive the 45 Sprint PCS Chevrolet and the No. 44 Hot Wheels Pontiac and qualified in nineteen races in 2000, causing him to finish 41st in the points standings in the 2000 Winston Cup Series.

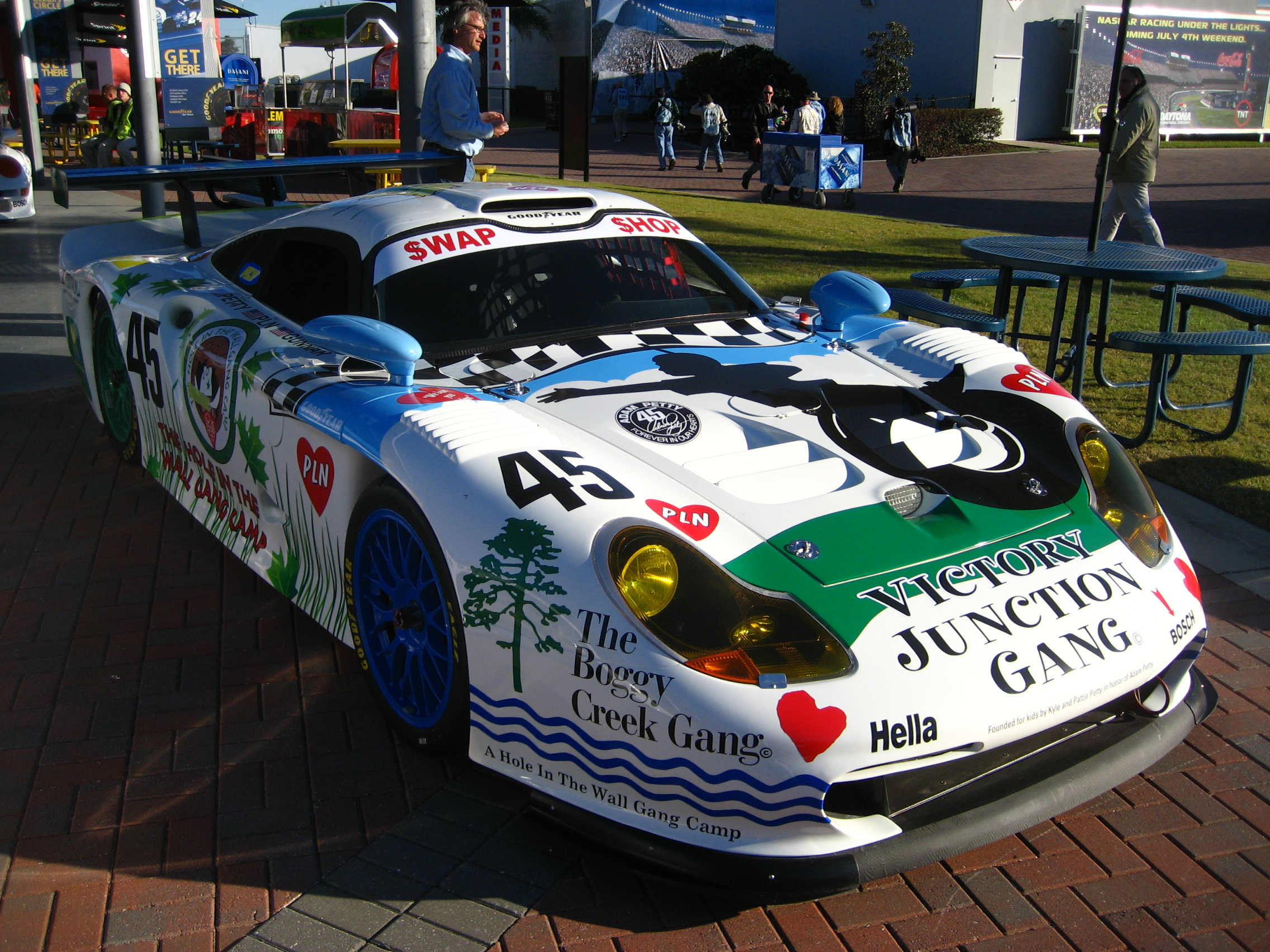
A GTS show car marked for Petty, but not raced, at the 24 Hours of Daytona in 2009

In 2001, Petty brought the No. 45 to Cup full-time and switched to Dodge. He failed to qualify for twelve races that season and failed to finish higher than sixteenth, causing him to finish 43rd in points. He qualified for every race in 2002 and had a top-ten at Talladega, raising him to 22nd in the points. After 2002, Sprint left the team and Brawny/Georgia Pacific became his new sponsor. He missed three races in 2003 (including one due to injury) and fell back to 37th in the standings.

In 2003, during the Food City 500, Petty crashed his No. 45 car in a hard driver's side impact, recording a hit of 80 g's. Petty held the record for hardest hit until Elliott Sadler crashed at Pocono in 2010. He moved up four spots in 2004 and had a best finish of twelfth. In 2005, he competed in every race for the first time in three years and had two top-tens and finished 27th in points. When Georgia Pacific left after 2005, Wells Fargo, Schwan's, and Marathon Oil became the team's new primary sponsors and Petty duplicated his top-ten total in 2006, but fell five spots further in points.

=== 2007–2008 ===
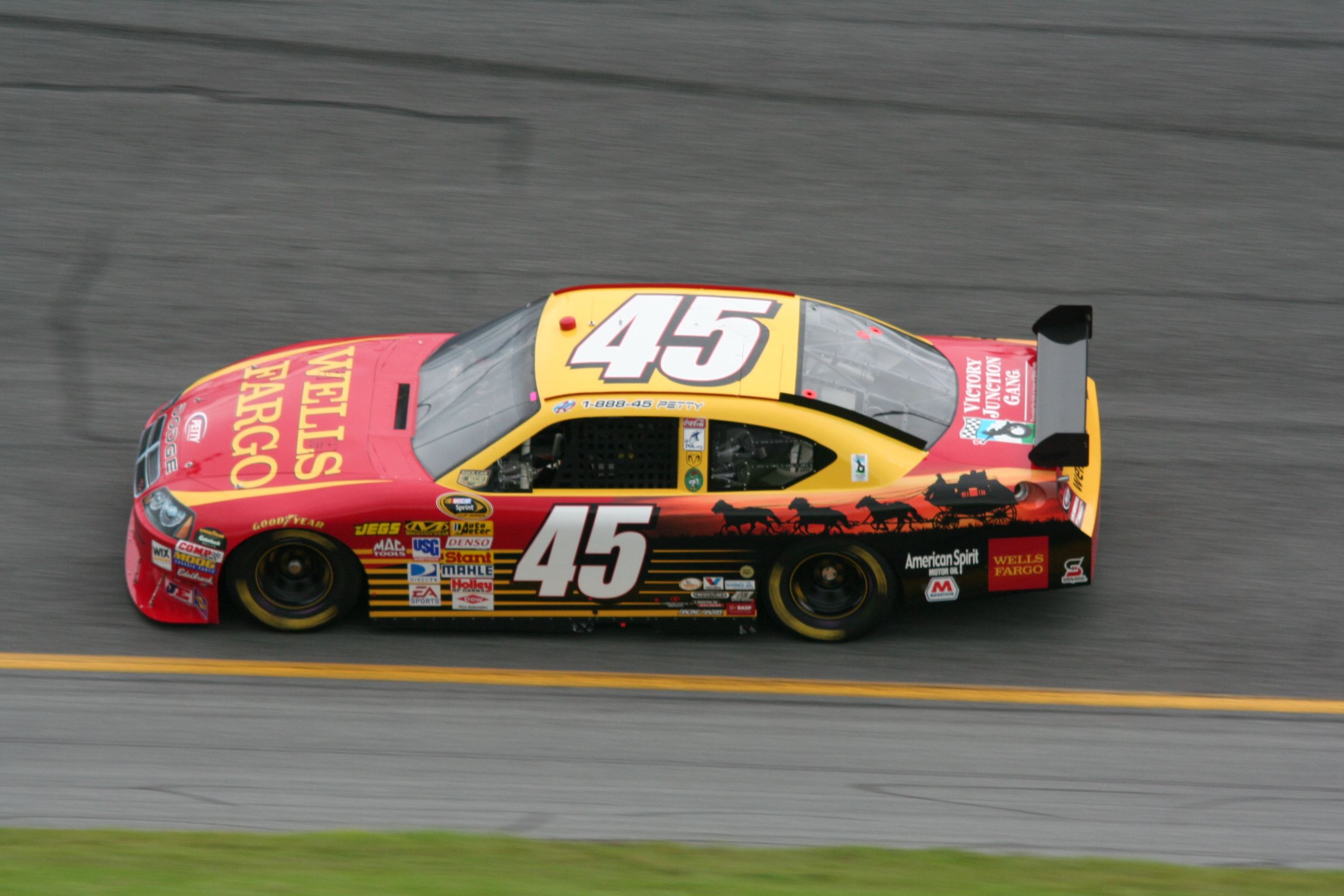
Petty's car at Daytona in 2008

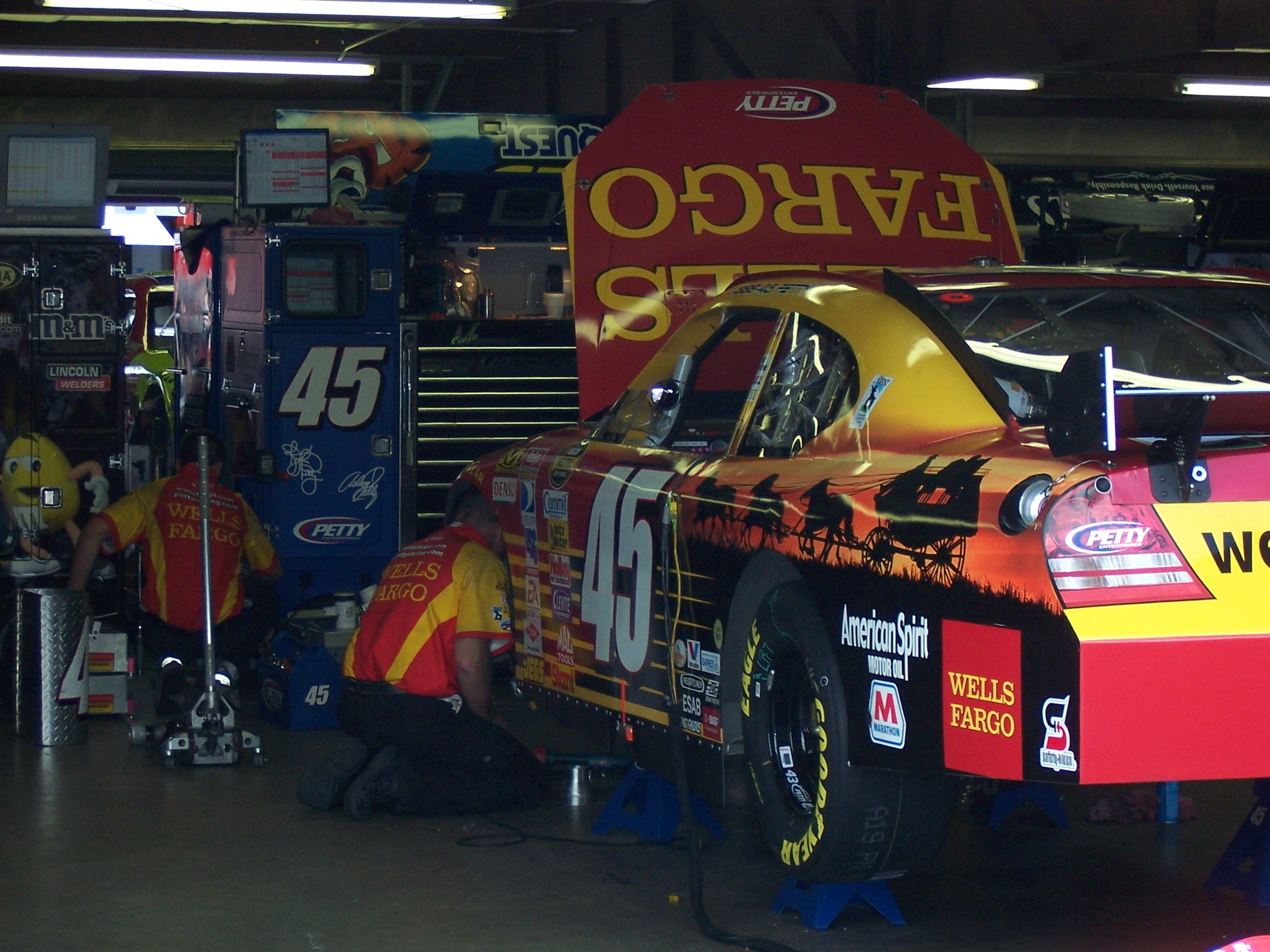
Petty's 2007 Dodge Avenger

At the 2007 Coca-Cola 600, Petty had his first top-five finish in ten years, finishing third in the Coke Zero Dodge. He then raced the Toyota Save Mart 350 at Sonoma in a Petty Enterprises car while broadcasting for TNT. On lap one as the cars began lap two, Petty crashed with Matt Kenseth, causing him to accidentally swear during the broadcasting.

Petty later took several races off to work as a color commentator for TNT's Nextel Cup coverage, replacing Benny Parsons after Parsons passed in January. He returned to the No. 45 after a five race break but surrendered the car for two additional races later in the season. Early in the 2008 season, Petty Enterprises was purchased by Boston Ventures, causing Petty to step aside as the team's CEO. When the No. 45 car fell out of the top-35 in owner's points, he took a large portion of the season off, including races that did not conflict with his broadcasting duties. After fourteen races, his best finish was a 24th at Richmond. He finished 39th in his final 2008 start in the fall race at Phoenix International Raceway after getting swept up into a multi-car crash. According to the Yahoo! sports blog "From The Marbles," he was being slowly pushed out the door at Petty Enterprises. In December, Petty told NASCAR.com, "I don't work for Petty Enterprises. When they did their deal and sold to Boston Ventures....they pretty much let me know there wasn't a place for me there going into 2009."

=== Other racing ===
Petty competed in the IROC XVIII in 1994 he finished 5th out of 12 racers.

== Post-retirement ==
Any time he appeared on television with Speed, Petty wears a hat with a number 45 with a black line across the number, in memory of his son Adam. In the early 2010s, he appeared on Fox Sports shows NASCAR Trackside, NASCAR Victory Lane, and NASCAR RaceDay as a television personality. Since 2015, he works for NBC Sports, appearing on all of their NASCAR related shows and broadcasts. In 2025 Petty received the Jim Hunter Media Award from the North Carolina Motorsports Association.

In 2023 Petty began hosting "Dinner Drive with Kyle Petty" on Circle Network a series where he takes celebrity guests including fellow athletes and entertainers on drives in notable vehicles before sharing meals and stories. As of 2026 the show has run for three seasons.

Since 2025 Petty has hosted the radio show/podcast "Kyle Petty's Back Then Again Country Countdown" alongside Charlie & Debbie. The podcast sees Petty discuss country music, pop culture and stories from his racing career.

== Personal life ==
Petty has been married twice, to Pattie Petty (1979–2012) and Morgan Petty in 2015. Kyle has six children: Adam Kyler Petty (1980–2000), Austin Kemp Petty (b. 1982), Montgomery Lee Petty Schlappi (b. 1985), and three other children. Petty also has a grandchild.

=== Charity ===
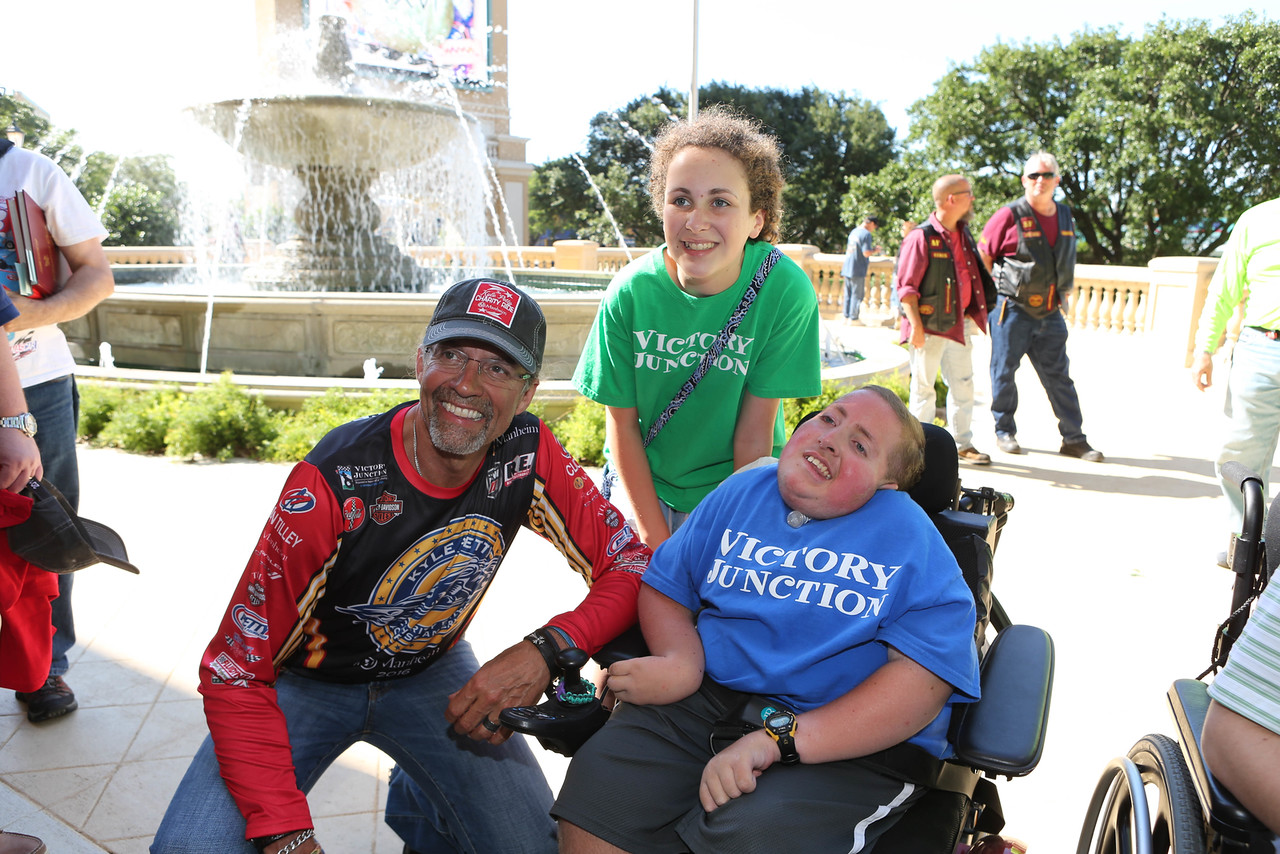
Kyle Petty poses with Victory Junction camper on 2016 Ride.

Petty is active in many charitable causes, such as Victory Junction, a facility for serious illness and chronic medical condition children, which he established to honor his late son, as well as an annual charity motorcycle ride across the country called the Kyle Petty Charity Ride Across America which he established in 1995. As of 2026 his ride has raised over $23 million for Victory Junction and other children's charities.

=== Music career ===
Petty is also known for his brief attempts as a professional country musician. He was signed to a record contract by RCA Records in 1986 and began work on an album with Don Light. His lone single from this period was "The Other Guy", which led to appearances on Hee Haw and opening for acts such as Randy Travis and The Oak Ridge Boys. Due to disagreements with his record company and management, Petty later abandoned the album project.

Later, Petty recorded a track entitled "Oh King Richard", a tribute to his father Richard written by Rodney Crowell that was released in 1995 as part of a NASCAR-themed country music compilation album. A music video for the song was produced, featuring Petty playing an acoustic guitar in front of his father's No. 43 racecar, as Richard watched highlights of his career on a screen.

On June 19, 2021 Petty performed multiple songs at Grand Ole Opry during NASCAR's Nashville weekend. He continues to play sporadic live shows.

=== Acting career ===
Petty appeared in the 1983 film Stroker Ace, as himself, and provided voice work for the character of Cal Weathers (the nephew of Strip Weathers, voiced by his father Richard Petty) in the 2017 film Cars 3.

== Motorsports career results ==
=== NASCAR ===
(key) (Bold – Pole position awarded by qualifying time. Italics – Pole position earned by points standings or practice time. * – Most laps led.)

==== Cup Series ====
NASCAR Sprint Cup Series results
Year	Team	No.	Make	1	2	3	4	5	6	7	8	9	10	11	12	13	14	15	16	17	18	19	20	21	22	23	24	25	26	27	28	29	30	31	32	33	34	35	36	NSCC	Pts	Ref
1979	Petty Enterprises	42	Dodge	RSD	DAY	CAR	RCH	ATL	NWS	BRI	DAR	MAR	TAL	NSV	DOV	CLT	TWS	RSD	MCH	DAY	NSV	POC	TAL; 9	MCH; 13	BRI	DAR	RCH	DOV	MAR	CLT; 18	NWS	CAR	ATL; 32							37th	559	
1979	Petty Enterprises	42	Chevy																															ONT; 14						37th	559	
1980	Petty Enterprises	42	Dodge	RSD	DAY; DNQ	RCH																																		28th	1690	
1980	Petty Enterprises	42	Chevy				CAR; 31	ATL; 14	BRI	DAR	NWS; 8	MAR; 15	TAL	NSV	DOV; 21	CLT; 7	TWS	RSD	MCH; 7	DAY	NSV	POC; 7	TAL; 9	MCH; 12	BRI	DAR	RCH				CLT; 9	CAR; 35	ATL	ONT; 35						28th	1690	
1980	Petty Enterprises	42	Olds																											MAR; 27										28th	1690	
1980	RahMoc Enterprises	75	Chevy																									DOV; 23	NWS											28th	1690	
1981	Petty Enterprises	43	Chevy	RSD; 20																																				12th	3335	
1981	Petty Enterprises	42	Buick		DAY; 32	RCH; 24	CAR; 8	ATL; 41	BRI; 11	NWS; 22	DAR; 25	MAR; 15	TAL; 30	NSV; 7	DOV; 20	CLT; 5	TWS; 29	RSD; 6	MCH; 21	DAY; 6	NSV; 6	POC; 8	TAL; 7	MCH; 19	BRI; 28	DAR; 24	RCH; 22	DOV; 7	MAR; 19	NWS; 18	CLT; 20	CAR; 37	ATL; 8	RSD; 37						12th	3335	
1982	Petty Enterprises	42	Pontiac	DAY; 23	RCH; 20	BRI; 11	ATL; 26	CAR; 27	DAR; 18	NWS; 14	MAR; 27	TAL; 4	NSV; 27	DOV; 29	CLT; 17	POC; 11	RSD; 12	MCH; 6		NSV; 23				BRI; 30		RCH; 14	DOV; 2	NWS; 10		MAR; 21	CAR; 29	ATL; 31	RSD							15th	3024	
1982	Ellington Racing	1	Buick																DAY; 38		POC; 15	TAL; 39	MCH; 15						CLT; 29											15th	3024	
1982	Ellington Racing	1	Chevy																						DAR; 14															15th	3024	
1983	Petty Enterprises	7	Pontiac	DAY; 33	RCH; 14	CAR; 15	ATL; 35	DAR; 31	NWS; 30	MAR; 11	TAL; 30	NSV; 17	DOV; 11	BRI; 11	CLT; 8	RSD; 6	POC; 13	MCH; 16	DAY; 30	NSV; 20	POC; 11	TAL; 11	MCH; 14	BRI; 11	DAR; 35	RCH; 12	DOV; 26	MAR; 12	NWS; 16	CLT; 18	CAR; 24	ATL; 20	RSD; 13							13th	3261	
1984	Petty Enterprises	7	Ford	DAY; 40	RCH; 17	CAR; 31	ATL; 38	BRI; 26	NWS; 5	DAR; 24	MAR; 8	TAL; 15	NSV; 11	DOV; 13	CLT; 37	RSD; 8	POC; 12	MCH; 12	DAY; 30	NSV; 15	POC; 8	TAL; 22	MCH; 17	BRI; 24	DAR; 32	RCH; 6	DOV; 14	MAR; 10	CLT; 17	NWS; 20	CAR; 24	ATL; 22	RSD; 28							16th	3159	
1985	Wood Brothers Racing	7	Ford	DAY; 37	RCH; 7	CAR; 5	ATL; 11	BRI; 6	DAR; 12	NWS; 12	MAR; 11	TAL; 2	DOV; 3	CLT; 14	RSD; 5	POC; 14	MCH; 12	DAY; 5	POC; 7	TAL; 25	MCH; 4	BRI; 16	DAR; 10	RCH; 8	DOV; 15	MAR; 5	NWS; 28	CLT; 22	CAR; 31	ATL; 29	RSD; 27									9th	3528	
1986	Wood Brothers Racing	7	Ford	DAY; 16	RCH; 1	CAR; 11	ATL; 28	BRI; 9	DAR; 9	NWS; 8	MAR; 5	TAL; 31	DOV; 19	CLT; 20	RSD; 41	POC; 8	MCH; 32	DAY; 5	POC; 8	TAL; 9	GLN; 9	MCH; 28	BRI; 30	DAR; 14	RCH; 20	DOV; 3	MAR; 6	NWS; 14	CLT; 13	CAR; 10	ATL; 7	RSD; 15								10th	3537	
1987	Wood Brothers Racing	21	Ford	DAY; 35	CAR; 16	RCH; 7	ATL; 9	DAR; 13	NWS; 2	BRI; 7	MAR; 12	TAL; 3	CLT; 1	DOV; 24	POC; 3	RSD; 24	MCH; 3	DAY; 17	POC; 20	TAL; 9	GLN; 12	MCH; 27	BRI; 28	DAR; 14	RCH; 18	DOV; 23	MAR; 9	NWS; 6	CLT; 10	CAR; 6	RSD; 3	ATL; 13								7th	3737	
1988	Wood Brothers Racing	21	Ford	DAY; 18	RCH; 18	CAR; 19	ATL; 5	DAR; 40	BRI; 7	NWS; 5	MAR; 17	TAL; 8	CLT; 16	DOV; 33	RSD; 14	POC; 12	MCH; 33	DAY; 24	POC; 18	TAL; 15	GLN; 34	MCH; 8	BRI; 13	DAR; 28	RCH; 6	DOV; 6	MAR; 22	CLT; 11	NWS; 16	CAR; 9	PHO; 17	ATL; 22								13th	3296	
1989	SABCO Racing	42	Pontiac	DAY; DNQ	CAR	ATL; 4	RCH; DNQ	DAR; 28	BRI	NWS	MAR	TAL; 28					MCH; 6	DAY; 14	POC; 14	TAL; 7	GLN	MCH; 9	BRI; 27	DAR; 14	RCH; 32	DOV; 11	MAR; 30	CLT; 29	NWS; 31	CAR; 10	PHO; 21	ATL; 6								30th	2099	
1989	Hendrick Motorsports	42	Chevy										CLT; 17	DOV	SON	POC																								30th	2099	
1990	SABCO Racing	42	Pontiac	DAY; 24	RCH; 11	**CAR**; 1*	ATL; 6	DAR; 13	BRI; 10	NWS; 10	MAR; 16	TAL; 7	CLT; 17	DOV; 9	SON; 16	POC; 10	MCH; 8	DAY; 10	POC; 35	TAL; 8	GLN; 17	MCH; 16	BRI; 28	DAR; 25	RCH; 6	DOV; 8	MAR; 23	**NWS**; 10	CLT; 4	CAR; 20*	PHO; 41	ATL; 41								11th	3501	
1991	SABCO Racing	42	Pontiac	DAY; 16*	RCH; 25	**CAR**; 1*	ATL; 39	DAR; 6	BRI; 21	NWS; 18	MAR; 2	TAL; 33	CLT	DOV	SON	POC	MCH	DAY	POC	TAL	GLN	MCH	BRI	DAR; 22	RCH; 26	DOV; 12	MAR; 12	NWS; 16	CLT; 15	**CAR**; 9	PHO; 20	ATL; 19								31st	2078	
1992	SABCO Racing	42	Pontiac	DAY; 6	**CAR**; 29	RCH; 20	ATL; 8	DAR; 27	BRI; 19	NWS; 28	MAR; 18	TAL; 10	CLT; 3*	DOV; 29	SON; 12	POC; 6	MCH; 4	DAY; 14	POC; 7	TAL; 6	GLN; 1*	MCH; 6	BRI; 4	DAR; 7	RCH; 12	DOV; 3	**MAR**; 4	NWS; 3	CLT; 3*	**CAR**; 1*	PHO; 19	ATL; 16								5th	3945	
1993	SABCO Racing	42	Pontiac	**DAY**; 31	CAR; 32	RCH; 5*	ATL; 7	DAR; 7	BRI; 3	NWS; 2	MAR; 5	TAL; 18	SON; 5	CLT; 14	DOV; 29	POC; 1*	MCH; 12	DAY; 33	NHA; 8	POC; 27	TAL; 4	GLN; 26	MCH; 18	BRI; 30	DAR; 16	RCH; 9	DOV; 14	MAR; 10	NWS; 4	CLT; 7	CAR; 13	PHO; 3	ATL; 11							5th	3860	
1994	SABCO Racing	42	Pontiac	DAY; 39	CAR; 8	RCH; 5	ATL; 13	DAR; 11	BRI; 20	NWS; 4	MAR; 26	TAL; 13	SON; 11	CLT; 26	DOV; 11	POC; 12	MCH; 17	DAY; 34	NHA; 8	POC; 27	TAL; 19	IND; 25	GLN; 37	MCH; 6	BRI; 15	DAR; 12	RCH; 38	DOV; 6	MAR; 24	NWS; 26	CLT; 30	CAR; 36	PHO; 6	ATL; 22						15th	3339	
1995	Team SABCO	42	Pontiac	DAY; 12	CAR; 10	RCH; 33	ATL; 14	DAR; 35	BRI; 35	NWS; 31	MAR; 9	TAL; 31	SON; 28	CLT; 29	DOV; 1*	POC; 39	MCH; 42	DAY; 7	NHA; 37	POC; 28	TAL; 6	IND; 25	GLN; 39	MCH; 42	BRI; DNQ	DAR; 24	RCH; 25	DOV; 26	MAR; 11	NWS; 30	CLT; 15	CAR; 32	PHO; 39	ATL; 33						30th	2638	
1996	Team SABCO	42	Pontiac	DAY; 18	CAR; 11	RCH; 20	ATL; 22	DAR; 12	BRI; 15	NWS; 30	MAR; 30	TAL; 18	SON; 30	CLT; 23	DOV; 18	POC; 20	MCH; 38	DAY; 24	NHA; 28	POC; 26	TAL; 12	IND; 38	GLN; 23	MCH	BRI	DAR; 17	RCH; 18	DOV; 8	MAR; 8	NWS; 31	CLT; 41	CAR; 25	PHO; 29	ATL; DNQ						27th	2696	
1997	PE2 Motorsports	44	Pontiac	DAY; 14	CAR; 29	RCH; 10	ATL; 13	DAR; 33	TEX; 27	BRI; 29	MAR; 40	SON; 13	TAL; 40	CLT; 14	DOV; 5	POC; 14	MCH; 26	CAL; 31	DAY; 7	NHA; 13	POC; 8	IND; 13	GLN; 26	MCH; 23	BRI; 36	DAR; 32	RCH; 20	NHA; 12	DOV; 3	MAR; 26	CLT; 9	TAL; 7	CAR; 22	PHO; 9	ATL; 6					15th	3455	
1998	PE2 Motorsports	44	Pontiac	DAY; 11	CAR; 24	LVS; 22	ATL; 36	DAR; 29	BRI; 38	TEX; 17	MAR; 34	TAL; 38	CAL; 42	CLT; 30	DOV; 42	RCH; 24	MCH; 36	POC; 31	SON; 26	NHA; 8	POC; 21	IND; 14	GLN; 6	MCH; 29	BRI; 12	NHA; 33	DAR; 28	RCH; 39	DOV; 41	MAR; 29	CLT; 18	TAL; 20	DAY; 22	PHO; 36	CAR; 39	ATL; 29				30th	2675	
1999	Petty Enterprises	44	Pontiac	DAY; 7	CAR; 43	LVS; DNQ	ATL; 43	DAR; 31	TEX; DNQ	BRI; 8	MAR; 10	TAL; 13	CAL; 26	RCH; 7	CLT; 30	DOV; 32	MCH; 27	POC; 19	SON; 8	DAY; 36	NHA; 41	POC; 16	IND; 41	GLN; 8	MCH; 31	BRI; 29	DAR; 28	RCH; 15	NHA; 33	DOV; 20	MAR; 7	CLT; 32	TAL; 19	CAR; 23	PHO; 7	HOM; 7	ATL; 24			26th	3103	
2000	Petty Enterprises	44	Pontiac	DAY; 25	CAR; 31	LVS; 29	ATL; 26	DAR; 25	BRI; 24	TEX; DNQ	MAR; 38	TAL; 9	CAL; 26	RCH; 28	CLT	DOV; DNQ	MCH; 39	POC; 41	SON; 19	DAY; 30	NHA	POC; 40	IND; DNQ	GLN; 41	MCH; DNQ	BRI; 22	DAR	RCH	NHA	DOV			TAL; QL^{†}	CAR	PHO					41st	1441	
2000	Penske–Kranefuss Racing	12	Ford																				IND; 32																	41st	1441	
2000	Petty Enterprises	45	Pontiac																												MAR; 31	CLT				HOM; DNQ	ATL			41st	1441	
2001	Petty Enterprises	45	Dodge	DAY; 16	CAR; DNQ	LVS; DNQ	ATL; 42	DAR; 35	BRI; 41	TEX; DNQ	MAR; 42	TAL; DNQ	CAL; 35	RCH; 22	CLT; DNQ	DOV; DNQ	MCH; 27	POC; 34	SON; 22	DAY; 29	CHI; DNQ	NHA; 26	POC; 31	IND; DNQ	GLN; 39	MCH; 25	BRI; DNQ	DAR; 26	RCH; 25	DOV; 43	KAN; DNQ	CLT; DNQ	MAR; DNQ	TAL; 33	PHO; 43	CAR; 43	HOM; 16	ATL; 30	NHA; 23	43rd	1673	
2002	Petty Enterprises	45	Dodge	DAY; 41	CAR; 37	LVS; 30	ATL; 15	DAR; 14	BRI; 12	TEX; 21	MAR; 20	TAL; 10	CAL; 17	RCH; 23	CLT; 13	DOV; 20	POC; 13	MCH; 12	SON; 17	DAY; 19	CHI; 24	NHA; 37	POC; 27	IND; 25	GLN; 29	MCH; 25	BRI; 15	DAR; 13	RCH; 17	NHA; 39	DOV; 16	KAN; 15	TAL; 16	CLT; 20	MAR; 37	ATL; 14	CAR; 30	PHO; 32	HOM; 31	22nd	3501	
2003	Petty Enterprises	45	Dodge	DAY; 13	CAR; 35	LVS; 31	ATL; 34	DAR; 36	BRI; 34	TEX; INQ^{‡}	TAL; 11	MAR; 34	CAL; 28	RCH; 27	CLT; 30	DOV; 43	POC; 27	MCH; 34	SON; 27	DAY; 23	CHI; 27	NHA; 32	POC; 34	IND; 40	GLN; 42	MCH; 16	BRI; 34	DAR; 27	RCH; 34	NHA; 30	DOV; 32	TAL; DNQ	KAN; 23	CLT; 40	MAR; 25	ATL; 25	PHO; 35	CAR; 32	HOM; DNQ	37th	2414	
2004	Petty Enterprises	45	Dodge	DAY; 21	CAR; 39	LVS; 12	ATL; 28	DAR; 34	BRI; 25	TEX; 21	MAR; 18	TAL; 24	CAL; 39	RCH; 27	CLT; 38	DOV; 37	POC; 37	MCH; 18	SON; 32	DAY; 24	CHI; 26	NHA; 27	POC; 19	IND; 23	GLN; 18	MCH; 29	BRI; 37	CAL; 35	RCH; 34	NHA; 21	DOV; 17	TAL; 29	KAN; 38	CLT; 27	MAR; 22	ATL; 29	PHO; 28	DAR; 35	HOM; DNQ	33rd	2811	
2005	Petty Enterprises	45	Dodge	DAY; 17	CAL; 18	LVS; 25	ATL; 36	BRI; 8	MAR; 18	TEX; 24	PHO; 31	TAL; 43	DAR; 28	RCH; 33	CLT; 17	DOV; 19	POC; 41	MCH; 30	SON; 27	DAY; 19	CHI; 27	NHA; 29	POC; 30	IND; 13	GLN; 20	MCH; 33	BRI; 25	CAL; 41	RCH; 27	NHA; 21	DOV; 8	TAL; 24	KAN; 29	CLT; 15	MAR; 14	ATL; 25	TEX; 21	PHO; 19	HOM; 27	27th	3288	
2006	Petty Enterprises	45	Dodge	DAY; 39	CAL; 25	LVS; 29	ATL; 8	BRI; 18	MAR; 30	TEX; 39	PHO; 31	TAL; 18	RCH; 26	DAR; 18	CLT; 25	DOV; 27	POC; 40	MCH; 35	SON; 21	DAY; 28	CHI; 28	NHA; 28	POC; 42	IND; 27	GLN; 30	MCH; 31	BRI; 34	CAL; 35	RCH; 34	NHA; 37	DOV; 25	KAN; 29	TAL; 38	CLT; 22	MAR; 10	ATL; 17	TEX; 11	PHO; 25	HOM; 28	32nd	2928	
2007	Petty Enterprises	45	Dodge	DAY; 42	CAL; 22	LVS; 28	ATL; 34	BRI; 20	MAR; 22	TEX; 35	PHO; 30	TAL; 18	RCH; 25	DAR; 25	CLT; 3	DOV; 34	POC	MCH	SON; 39	NHA	DAY	CHI	IND; 32	POC; 34	GLN; 43	MCH	BRI	CAL; 28	RCH; 35	NHA; 37	DOV; 40	KAN; 21	TAL; 28	CLT; 18	MAR; 21	ATL; 13	TEX; 42	PHO; 29	HOM; 34	35th	2312	
2008	Petty Enterprises	45	Dodge	DAY; 34	CAL; 38	LVS; 41	ATL; 32	BRI; 28	MAR; DNQ	TEX	PHO; DNQ	TAL; 32	RCH; 27	DAR; 41	CLT; 36	DOV	POC	MCH	SON	NHA	DAY	CHI	IND	POC	GLN; QL^{¤}	MCH	BRI; 31	CAL; 38	RCH; 24	NHA	DOV; 40	KAN; 41	TAL	CLT	MAR	ATL	TEX	PHO; 39	HOM	44th	879	
^{†} - Qualified for Steve Grissom · ^{‡} Qualified but replaced by Christian Fittipaldi · ^{¤} - Qualified for Boris Said

===== Daytona 500 =====
Year	Team	Manufacturer	Start	Finish
1980	Petty Enterprises	Dodge	DNQ	
1981	Petty Enterprises	Buick	11	32
1982	Petty Enterprises	Pontiac	12	23
1983	Petty Enterprises	Pontiac	7	33
1984	Petty Enterprises	Ford	15	40
1985	Wood Brothers Racing	Ford	6	37
1986	Wood Brothers Racing	Ford	7	16
1987	Wood Brothers Racing	Ford	20	35
1988	Wood Brothers Racing	Ford	21	18
1989	SABCO Racing	Pontiac	DNQ	
1990	SABCO Racing	Pontiac	22	24
1991	SABCO Racing	Pontiac	6	16
1992	SABCO Racing	Pontiac	33	6
1993	SABCO Racing	Pontiac	**1**	31
1994	SABCO Racing	Pontiac	26	39
1995	Team SABCO	Pontiac	13	12
1996	Team SABCO	Pontiac	29	18
1997	PE2 Motorsports	Pontiac	30	14
1998	PE2 Motorsports	Pontiac	39	11
1999	Petty Enterprises	Pontiac	24	7
2000	Petty Enterprises	Pontiac	42	25
2001	Petty Enterprises	Dodge	28	16
2002	Petty Enterprises	Dodge	34	41
2003	Petty Enterprises	Dodge	30	13
2004	Petty Enterprises	Dodge	33	21
2005	Petty Enterprises	Dodge	33	17
2006	Petty Enterprises	Dodge	12	39
2007	Petty Enterprises	Dodge	29	42
2008	Petty Enterprises	Dodge	39	34

==== Busch Series ====
NASCAR Busch Series results
Year	Team	No.	Make	1	2	3	4	5	6	7	8	9	10	11	12	13	14	15	16	17	18	19	20	21	22	23	24	25	26	27	28	29	30	31	32	NBSC	Pts	Ref
1982	Kerry Bodenhamer	36	Pontiac	DAY	RCH	BRI	MAR	DAR	HCY	SBO	CRW	RCH	LGY	DOV	HCY	CLT	ASH	HCY	SBO	CAR	CRW	SBO	HCY	LGY	IRP; 25	BRI	HCY	RCH	MAR; 22	CLT	HCY	MAR				101st	185	
1986	Randy Hope Motorsports	47	Buick	DAY; 12	CAR	HCY	MAR; 17	BRI	DAR; 28	SBO	LGY	JFC	DOV	CLT; 9	SBO	HCY	ROU	IRP	SBO	RAL	OXF	SBO	HCY	LGY	ROU	BRI	DAR	RCH	DOV	MAR	ROU	CLT; 26	CAR	MAR		42nd	456	
1988	Petty Enterprises	30	Ford	DAY; 12	HCY	CAR; 14	MAR	DAR; 37	BRI; 18	LNG	NZH	SBO	NSV	CLT; 14	DOV; 34	ROU	LAN	LVL	MYB	OXF	SBO	HCY	LNG	IRP; 8	ROU	BRI	DAR; 15	RCH	DOV; 30	MAR	CLT; 37	CAR; 25	MAR			43rd	537	
1989	Highline Racing	82	Pontiac	DAY	CAR	MAR	HCY	DAR	BRI	NZH	SBO	LAN	NSV	CLT; 33	DOV													DOV; 4	MAR	CLT	CAR	MAR				61st	370	
1989	Highline Racing	81	Buick													ROU; 7	LVL	VOL	MYB	SBO	HCY	DUB	IRP	ROU	BRI	DAR	RCH									61st	370	
1990	Highline Racing	42	Pontiac	DAY; 32	RCH; 30*	CAR; 2*	MAR	HCY	DAR; 37	BRI; 3	LAN	SBO	NZH; 36	HCY	CLT; 25	DOV; DNQ	ROU	VOL	MYB	OXF	NHA; 22	SBO	DUB	IRP; 13	ROU	BRI; 16	DAR	RCH	DOV; 30	MAR	CLT	NHA	CAR	MAR		35th	1079	
1995	Team SABCO	42	Pontiac	DAY	CAR	RCH	ATL	NSV	DAR	BRI	HCY	NHA	NZH	CLT	DOV	MYB	GLN	MLW	TAL	SBO	IRP	MCH	BRI	DAR	RCH	DOV	CLT	CAR	HOM; DNQ							NA	-	
1996	Shaver Motorsports	49	Chevy	DAY	CAR	RCH	ATL	NSV	DAR	BRI	HCY	NZH	CLT	DOV	SBO	MYB	GLN	MLW	NHA	TAL	IRP	MCH	BRI	DAR	RCH	DOV	CLT; 34	CAR	HOM; 17							72nd	173	
1997	Shaver Motorsports	49	Chevy	DAY; 24	CAR	RCH								TAL; 4	NHA	NZH	CLT; 38	DOV	SBO	GLN	MLW	MYB	GTY; 35	IRP	MCH; DNQ	BRI	DAR	RCH; 33	DOV	CLT	CAL	CAR	HOM			60th	422	
1997	Shaver Motorsports	49	Pontiac				ATL; DNQ	LVS	DAR	HCY	TEX	BRI	NSV																							60th	422	
1998	Andretti-Laird Racing	96	Chevy	DAY	CAR	LVS	NSV	DAR	BRI	TEX; 12	HCY	TAL	NHA	NZH	CLT	DOV	RCH	PPR	GLN	MLW	MYB	CAL	SBO	IRP	MCH	BRI	DAR	RCH	DOV	CLT	GTY	CAR	ATL	HOM		91st	127	
2000	Petty Enterprises	45	Chevy	DAY	CAR	LVS	ATL	DAR	BRI	TEX	NSV	TAL	CAL	RCH	NHA	CLT	DOV; 26	SBO	MYB	GLN	MLW; 8	NZH; 5	PPR	GTY; 9	IRP; 15	MCH; 11	BRI; 19	DAR; 13	RCH; 29	DOV; 40	CLT; 17	CAR; 15	MEM; 21	PHO; 16	HOM; 9	31st	1710	

==== Craftsman Truck Series ====
NASCAR Craftsman Truck Series results
Year	Team	No.	Make	1	2	3	4	5	6	7	8	9	10	11	12	13	14	15	16	17	18	19	20	21	22	23	24	25	26	NCTC	Pts	Ref
1997	McCray Racing	42	Chevy	WDW	TUS	HOM	PHO	POR	EVG	I70	NHA	TEX	BRI	NZH	MLW	LVL	CNS	HPT	IRP	FLM	NSV	GLN	RCH	MAR	SON	MMR	CAL; 11	PHO	LVS	100th	130	

==== Winston West Series ====
NASCAR Winston West Series results
Year	Team	No.	Make	1	2	3	4	5	6	7	8	9	10	11	12	13	14	15	16	NWWSC	Pts	Ref
1979	Petty Enterprises	4	Chevy	RSD	MMR	RSD	EVG	YAK	POR	AAS	SHA	CRS	SON	EVG	SRP	POR	ASP	ONT	PHO; 8	60th	43	
1980	Petty Enterprises	42	Chevy	RSD	ONT	S99	RSD	LAG	EVG	POR	SON	MMR	ONT	PHO; 3						76th	–	
1981	Petty Enterprises	42	Buick	RSD	S99	AAS	MMR	RSD	LAG	POR	WSP	EVG	SHA	RSD	SON	RSD	PHO; 3			36th	48	
1984	Jefferson Racing	7	Ford	RSD	YAK	SIR; 17	POR	EVG	SHA	WSR	SON	MMR	RSD	PHO						40th	34	

=== ARCA Racing Series ===
(key) (Bold – Pole position awarded by qualifying time. Italics – Pole position earned by points standings or practice time. * – Most laps led.)

ARCA Racing Series results
Year	Team	No.	Make	1	2	3	4	5	6	7	8	9	ARSC	Pts	Ref
1979	Petty Enterprises	44	Dodge	AVS	DAY; 1*	NSV	FRS	SLM	DSP	IMS	TAL	FRS	N/A	–	

=== International Race of Champions ===
(key) (Bold – Pole position. * – Most laps led.)

International Race of Champions results
Year	Make	1	2	3	4	Pos.	Points	Ref
1994	Dodge	DAY; 5	DAR; 5	TAL; 7	MCH; 8	7th	35	
