= Kyle Petty Charity Ride Across America =

Annual charity cross-country motorcycle ride

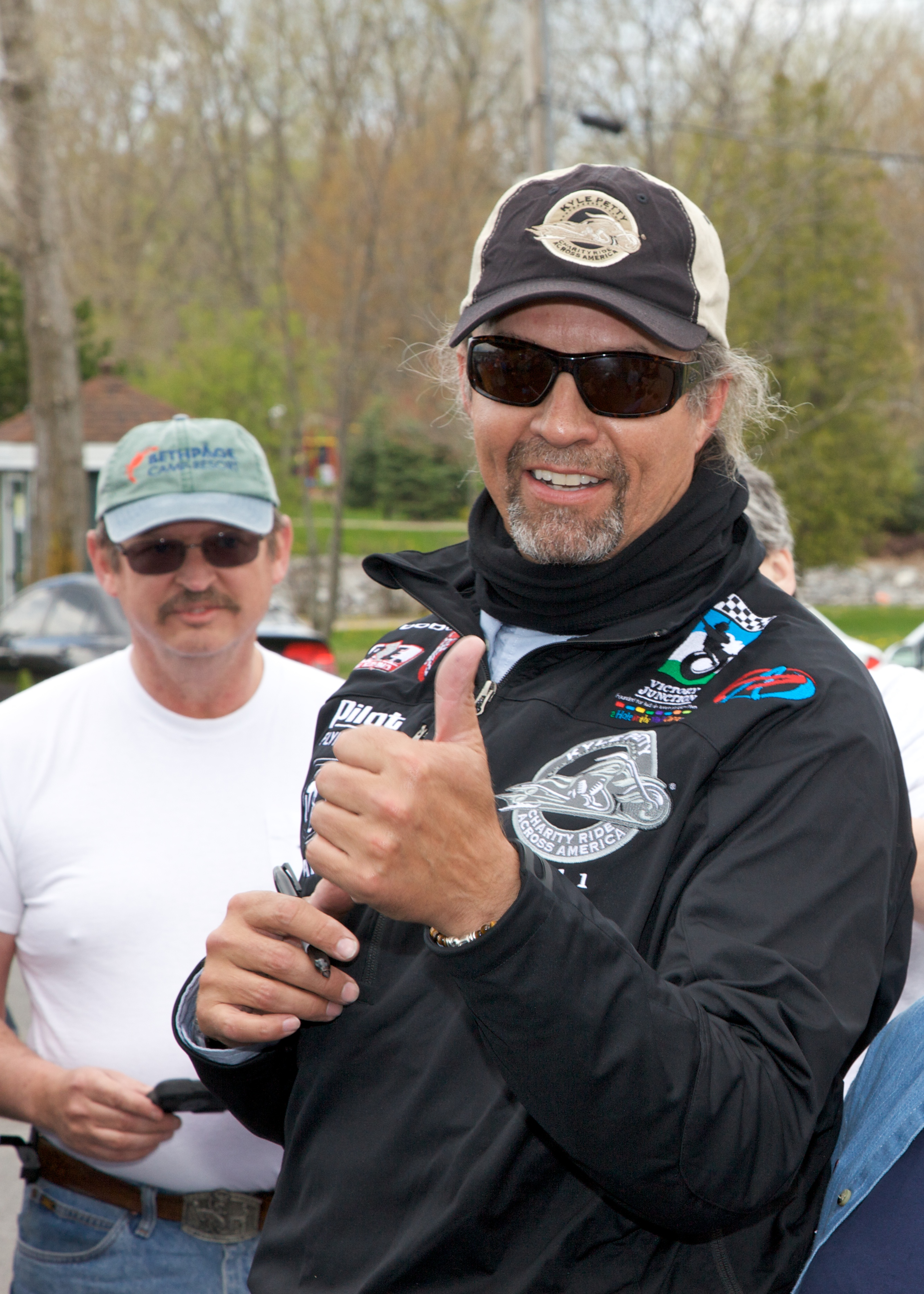
Kyle Petty during the 2011 ride.

The Kyle Petty Charity Ride Across America is an annual, cross-country motorcycle ride that travels to raise awareness and funds for Victory Junction, a camp created to enrich the lives of children with chronic or life-threatening medical illnesses. One of the most successful and popular charity events in the country, the Ride engages celebrities, sponsors, motorcycle enthusiasts, fans and local communities. The Ride was founded in 1995 by NASCAR driver Kyle Petty.

== About ==
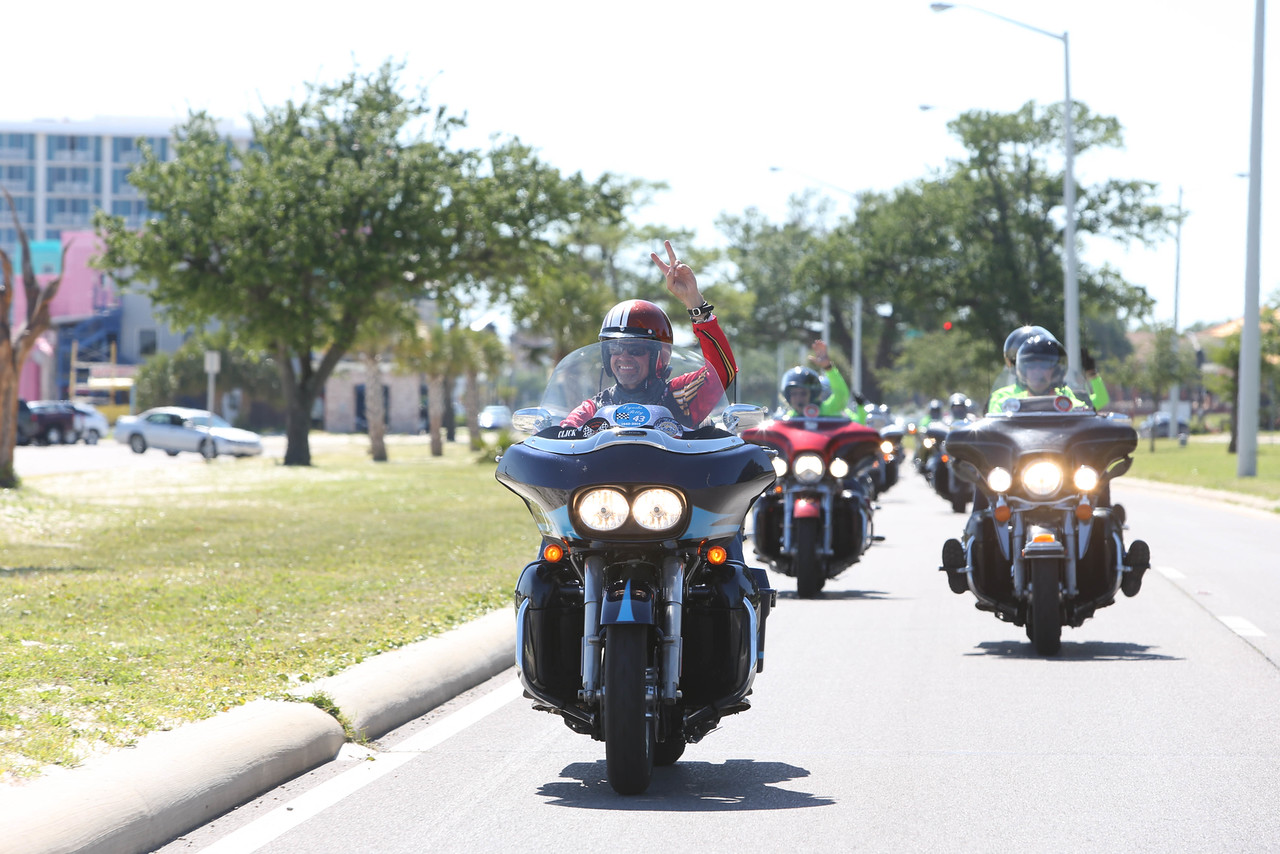
Kyle Petty leads bikers during 2016 motorcycle trek.

The Kyle Petty Charity Ride Across America is a week-long motorcycle trek through various cities nationwide. Since the Ride began in 1995, more than 7,950 riders have logged 11.6 million cumulative motorcycle miles and raised $23 million for Victory Junction and other children's charities.

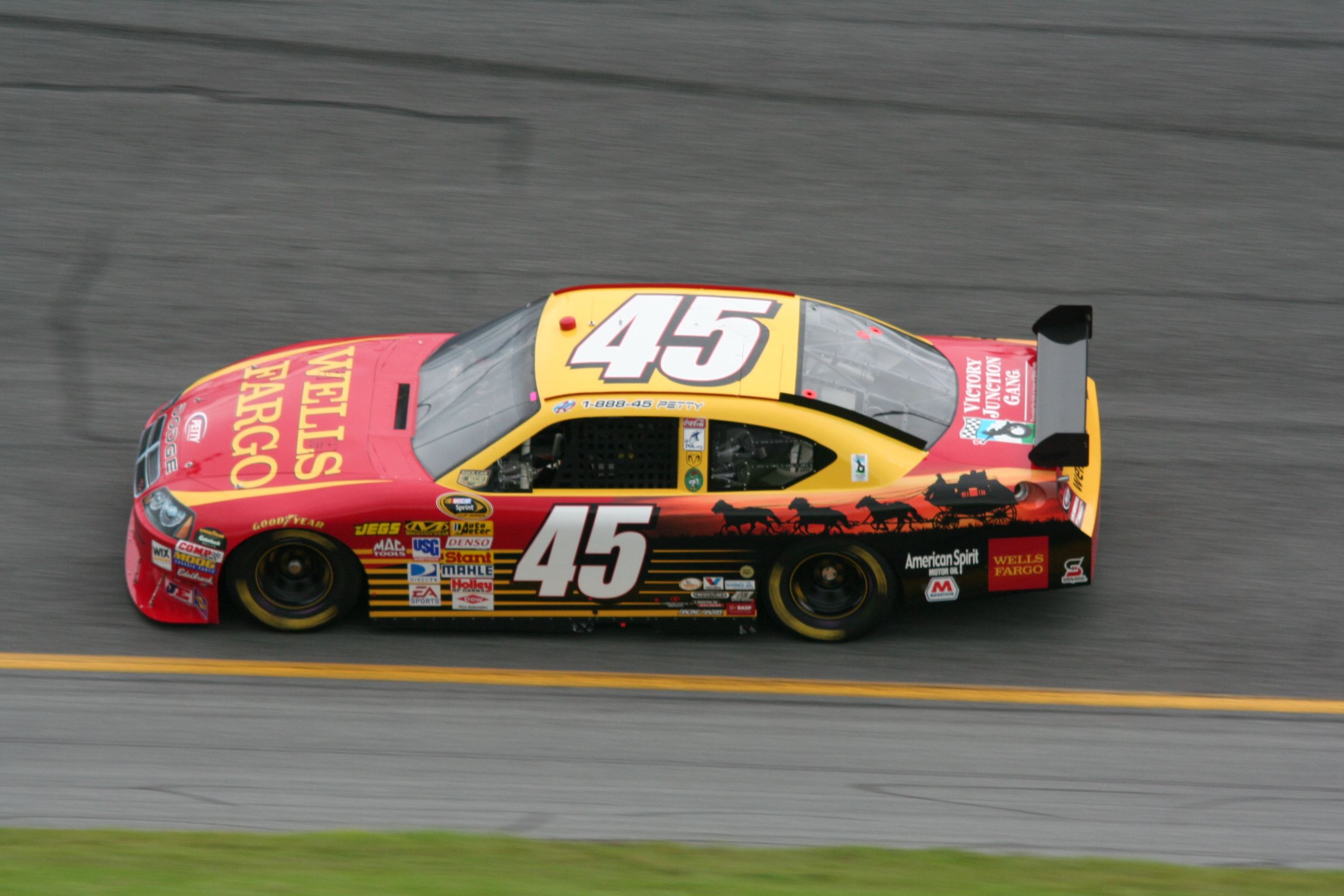
Petty's car at Daytona in 2008

== Beneficiaries ==
=== Victory Junction ===
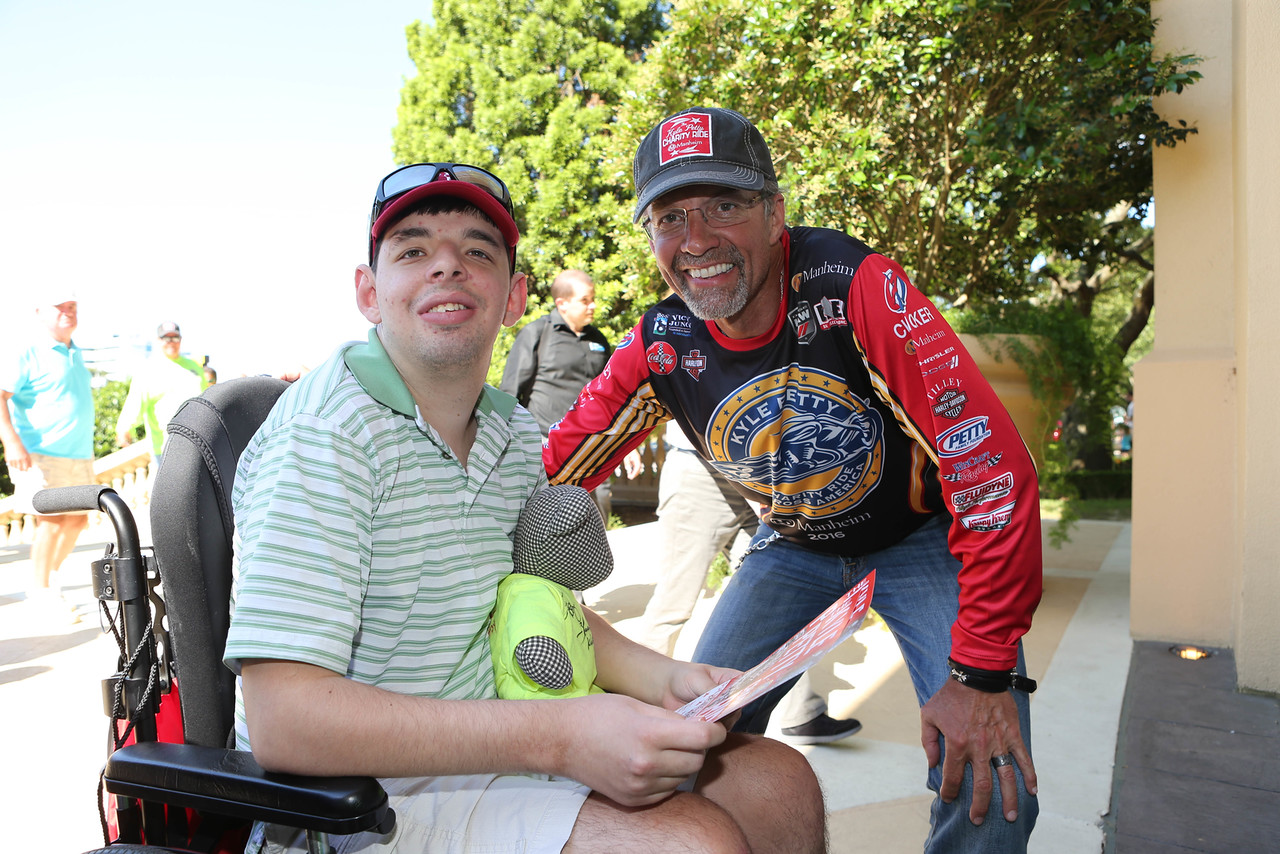
Kyle Petty with Victory Junction camper on 2016 Ride in Biloxi, Mississippi.

Since its inception by Kyle in 2004 in honor of his late son Adam, Victory Junction has served as the Ride's primary beneficiary. Located on 84 acres in Randleman, North Carolina, Victory Junction exists to enrich the lives of children with chronic or life-threatening illnesses by creating camping experiences that are memorable, fun, empowering, physically safe and medically sound. As a result of the Ride, 7,985 children have attended Victory Junction at no cost to their families. Every week of summer, up to 120 kids can go to the camp for 5 days.

== History ==
The inspiration for the Ride came in 1994, when Petty and three friends rode their motorcycles from North Carolina to a NASCAR race at Phoenix International Raceway. Friends joined the ride along the way, and by the time the group reached Phoenix, it had grown to 30 riders. The turnout inspired Petty, and he decided to nurture the event into something bigger; thus the Kyle Petty Charity Ride Across America was born.

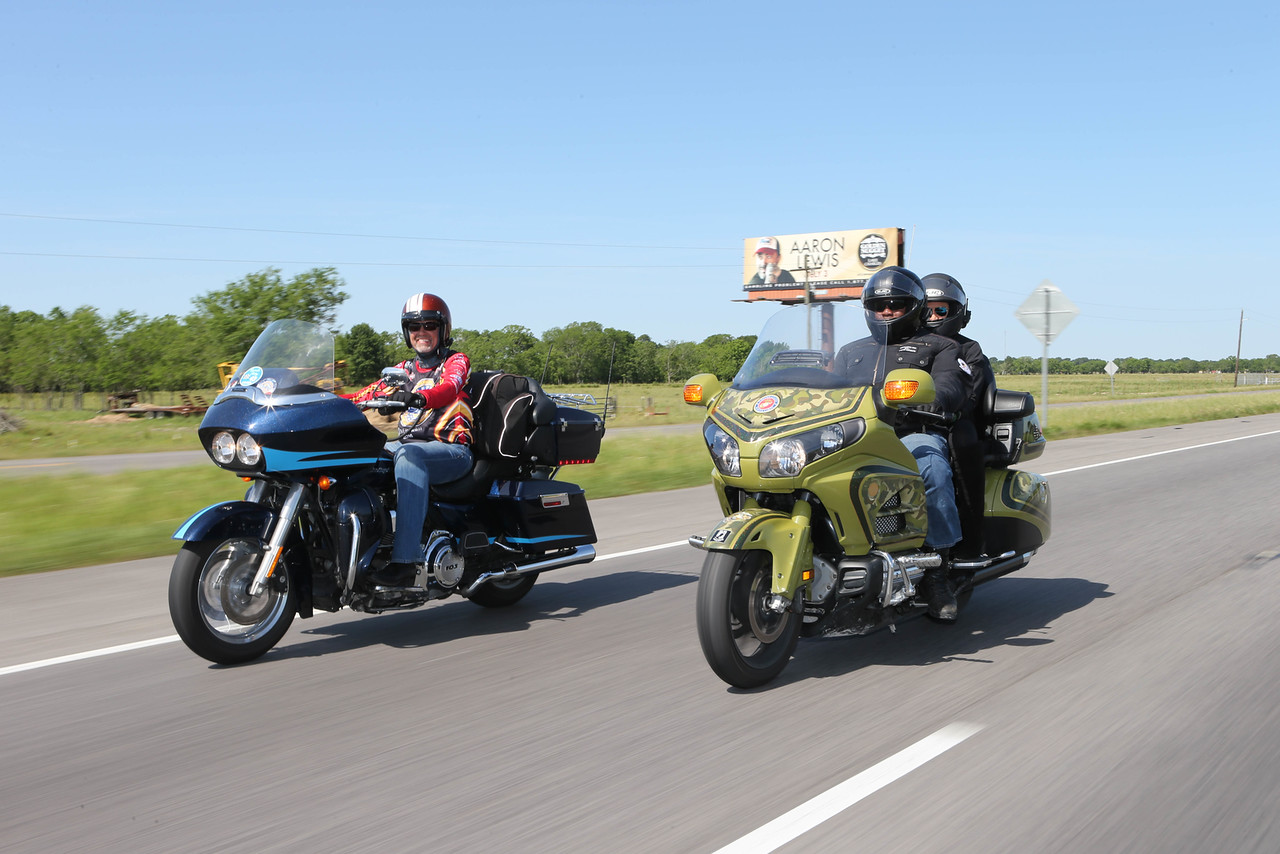
Kyle Petty and Herschel Walker on 2016 Ride.

Over the years, many celebrities have participated in the ride, including many NASCAR legends and personalities like Richard Petty, Donnie Allison, Harry Gant, Hershel McGriff, Tony Stewart and Matt Kenseth. Other notable riders have included John Boy and Billy, Paul Teutul Sr., Rutledge Wood, Davis Love III, Herschel Walker, and Brad Daugherty.

There was one event casualty: in 2020 when the Ride was cancelled on COVID-19 pandemic grounds.

The ride will be celebrating its 30th anniversary from May 1, to May 9, 2026. Starting in Sonoma, California it will end in Charlotte, North Carolina they will also be working closely with America 250.
