= 2003 MBNA America 400 =

28th race of the 2003 NASCAR Winston Cup Series

Race details
- Race 28 of 36 in the 2003 NASCAR Winston Cup Series
- The 2003 MBNA America 400 program cover.
- Date: September 21, 2003
- Official name: 35th Annual MBNA America 400
- Location: Dover, Delaware, Dover International Speedway
- Course: Permanent racing facility
- Course length: 1 miles (1.6 km)
- Distance: 400 laps, 400 mi (643.737 km)
- Scheduled distance: 400 laps, 400 mi (643.737 km)
- Average speed: 108.802 miles per hour (175.100 km/h)
- Attendance: 137,000

Pole position
Driver	Matt Kenseth	Roush Racing
- Time: Set by 2003 owner's points

Most laps led
Driver	Kevin Harvick	Richard Childress Racing
- Laps: 133

Winner
No. 12	Ryan Newman	Penske Racing South

Television in the United States
- Network: NBC
- Announcers: Allen Bestwick, Benny Parsons, Wally Dallenbach Jr.

Radio in the United States
- Radio: Motor Racing Network

The 2003 MBNA America 400 was the 28th stock car race of the 2003 NASCAR Winston Cup Series season and the 35th iteration of the event. The race was held on Sunday, September 21, 2003, before a crowd of 137,000 in Dover, Delaware at Dover International Speedway, a 1-mile (1.6 km) permanent oval-shaped racetrack. The race took the scheduled 400 laps to complete. At race's end, Ryan Newman of Penske Racing South would come back from two laps down and save fuel at the end to win his eighth career NASCAR Winston Cup Series win and his seventh win of the season. To fill out the podium, Jeremy Mayfield of Evernham Motorsports and Tony Stewart of Joe Gibbs Racing would finish second and third, respectively.

Dale Earnhardt Jr. would suffer a concussion during the race on lap 363.

== Background ==
The layout of Dover International Speedway, the venue where the race was held.

Dover International Speedway is an oval race track in Dover, Delaware, United States that has held at least two NASCAR races since it opened in 1969. In addition to NASCAR, the track also hosted USAC and the NTT IndyCar Series. The track features one layout, a 1-mile (1.6 km) concrete oval, with 24° banking in the turns and 9° banking on the straights. The speedway is owned and operated by Dover Motorsports.

The track, nicknamed "The Monster Mile", was built in 1969 by Melvin Joseph of Melvin L. Joseph Construction Company, Inc., with an asphalt surface, but was replaced with concrete in 1995. Six years later in 2001, the track's capacity moved to 135,000 seats, making the track have the largest capacity of sports venue in the mid-Atlantic. In 2002, the name changed to Dover International Speedway from Dover Downs International Speedway after Dover Downs Gaming and Entertainment split, making Dover Motorsports. From 2007 to 2009, the speedway worked on an improvement project called "The Monster Makeover", which expanded facilities at the track and beautified the track. After the 2014 season, the track's capacity was reduced to 95,500 seats.

=== Entry list ===
#	Driver	Team	Make
0	Jason Leffler	Haas CNC Racing	Pontiac
1	John Andretti	Dale Earnhardt, Inc.	Chevrolet
01	Mike Skinner	MB2 Motorsports	Pontiac
2	Rusty Wallace	Penske Racing South	Dodge
02	Hermie Sadler	SCORE Motorsports	Pontiac
4	Kevin Lepage	Morgan–McClure Motorsports	Pontiac
5	Terry Labonte	Hendrick Motorsports	Chevrolet
6	Mark Martin	Roush Racing	Ford
7	Jimmy Spencer	Ultra Motorsports	Dodge
8	Dale Earnhardt Jr.	Dale Earnhardt, Inc.	Chevrolet
9	Bill Elliott	Evernham Motorsports	Dodge
10	Johnny Benson Jr.	MB2 Motorsports	Pontiac
12	Ryan Newman	Penske Racing South	Dodge
15	Michael Waltrip	Dale Earnhardt, Inc.	Chevrolet
16	Greg Biffle	Roush Racing	Ford
17	Matt Kenseth	Roush Racing	Ford
18	Bobby Labonte	Joe Gibbs Racing	Chevrolet
19	Jeremy Mayfield	Evernham Motorsports	Dodge
20	Tony Stewart	Joe Gibbs Racing	Chevrolet
21	Ricky Rudd	Wood Brothers Racing	Ford
22	Ward Burton	Bill Davis Racing	Dodge
23	Kenny Wallace	Bill Davis Racing	Dodge
24	Jeff Gordon	Hendrick Motorsports	Chevrolet
25	Joe Nemechek	Hendrick Motorsports	Chevrolet
27	Scott Wimmer	Bill Davis Racing	Chevrolet
29	Kevin Harvick	Richard Childress Racing	Chevrolet
30	Steve Park	Richard Childress Racing	Chevrolet
31	Robby Gordon	Richard Childress Racing	Chevrolet
32	Ricky Craven	PPI Motorsports	Pontiac
37	Derrike Cope	Quest Motor Racing	Chevrolet
38	Elliott Sadler	Robert Yates Racing	Ford
40	Sterling Marlin	Chip Ganassi Racing	Dodge
41	Casey Mears	Chip Ganassi Racing	Dodge
42	Jamie McMurray	Chip Ganassi Racing	Dodge
43	Jeff Green	Petty Enterprises	Dodge
44	Christian Fittipaldi	Petty Enterprises	Dodge
45	Kyle Petty	Petty Enterprises	Dodge
48	Jimmie Johnson	Hendrick Motorsports	Chevrolet
49	Ken Schrader	BAM Racing	Dodge
50	Larry Foyt	A. J. Foyt Enterprises	Dodge
54	Todd Bodine	BelCar Motorsports	Ford
71	Tim Sauter	Marcis Auto Racing	Chevrolet
74	Tony Raines	BACE Motorsports	Chevrolet
77	Dave Blaney	Jasper Motorsports	Ford
79	Billy Bigley	Arnold Motorsports	Dodge
79	Rich Bickle*	Conely Racing	Chevrolet
88	Dale Jarrett	Robert Yates Racing	Ford
89	Morgan Shepherd	Shepherd Racing Ventures	Ford
91	Shane Hmiel*	Evernham Motorsports	Dodge
97	Kurt Busch	Roush Racing	Ford
99	Jeff Burton	Roush Racing	Ford
Official entry list

*Withdrew.

== Practice ==
=== First practice ===
The first practice session was held on Saturday, September 20, at 11:15 AM EST, and would last for one hour and 15 minutes. Jimmie Johnson of Hendrick Motorsports would set the fastest time in the session, with a lap of 23.472 and an average speed of 153.374 miles per hour (246.832 km/h).

Pos.	#	Driver	Team	Make	Time	Speed
1	48	Jimmie Johnson	Hendrick Motorsports	Chevrolet	23.472	153.374
2	20	Tony Stewart	Joe Gibbs Racing	Chevrolet	23.521	153.055
3	12	Ryan Newman	Penske Racing South	Dodge	23.538	152.944
Full first practice results

=== Second and final practice ===
The second and final practice session, sometimes referred to as Happy Hour, was held on Saturday, September 20, at approximately 3:00 PM EST, and would last for approximately one hour. Dale Earnhardt Jr. of Dale Earnhardt, Inc. would set the fastest time in the session, with a lap of 23.583 and an average speed of 152.652 miles per hour (245.670 km/h).

Pos.	#	Driver	Team	Make	Time	Speed
1	8	Dale Earnhardt Jr.	Dale Earnhardt, Inc.	Chevrolet	23.583	152.652
2	2	Rusty Wallace	Penske Racing South	Dodge	23.630	152.349
3	12	Ryan Newman	Penske Racing South	Dodge	23.650	152.220
Full Happy Hour practice results

== Qualifying ==
Qualifying was canceled due to the impeding threat of Hurricane Isabel. As a result, the current 2003 owner's standings were used to determine the lineup. Matt Kenseth of Roush Racing would win the pole.

Pos.	#	Driver	Team	Make
1	17	Matt Kenseth	Roush Racing	Ford
2	8	Dale Earnhardt Jr.	Dale Earnhardt, Inc.	Chevrolet
3	29	Kevin Harvick	Richard Childress Racing	Chevrolet
4	48	Jimmie Johnson	Hendrick Motorsports	Chevrolet
5	12	Ryan Newman	Penske Racing South	Dodge
6	24	Jeff Gordon	Hendrick Motorsports	Chevrolet
7	97	Kurt Busch	Roush Racing	Ford
8	18	Bobby Labonte	Joe Gibbs Racing	Chevrolet
9	5	Terry Labonte	Hendrick Motorsports	Chevrolet
10	15	Michael Waltrip	Dale Earnhardt, Inc.	Chevrolet
11	20	Tony Stewart	Joe Gibbs Racing	Chevrolet
12	31	Robby Gordon	Richard Childress Racing	Chevrolet
13	99	Jeff Burton	Roush Racing	Ford
14	2	Rusty Wallace	Penske Racing South	Dodge
15	9	Bill Elliott	Evernham Motorsports	Dodge
16	6	Mark Martin	Roush Racing	Ford
17	40	Sterling Marlin	Chip Ganassi Racing	Dodge
18	42	Jamie McMurray	Chip Ganassi Racing	Dodge
19	16	Greg Biffle	Roush Racing	Ford
20	38	Elliott Sadler	Robert Yates Racing	Ford
21	22	Ward Burton	Bill Davis Racing	Dodge
22	32	Ricky Craven	PPI Motorsports	Pontiac
23	21	Ricky Rudd	Wood Brothers Racing	Ford
24	25	Joe Nemechek	Hendrick Motorsports	Chevrolet
25	19	Jeremy Mayfield	Evernham Motorsports	Dodge
26	10	Johnny Benson Jr.	MB2 Motorsports	Pontiac
27	88	Dale Jarrett	Robert Yates Racing	Ford
28	77	Dave Blaney	Jasper Motorsports	Ford
29	7	Jimmy Spencer	Ultra Motorsports	Dodge
30	1	John Andretti	Dale Earnhardt, Inc.	Chevrolet
31	23	Kenny Wallace	Bill Davis Racing	Dodge
32	30	Steve Park	Richard Childress Racing	Chevrolet
33	54	Todd Bodine	BelCar Racing	Ford
34	01	Mike Skinner	MB2 Motorsports	Pontiac
35	41	Casey Mears	Chip Ganassi Racing	Dodge
36	45	Kyle Petty	Petty Enterprises	Dodge
37	0	Jason Leffler	Haas CNC Racing	Pontiac
38	49	Ken Schrader	BAM Racing	Dodge
39	74	Tony Raines	BACE Motorsports	Chevrolet
40	4	Kevin Lepage	Morgan–McClure Motorsports	Pontiac
41	43	Jeff Green	Petty Enterprises	Dodge
42	37	Derrike Cope	Quest Motor Racing	Chevrolet
43	02	Hermie Sadler	SCORE Motorsports	Pontiac
Failed to qualify or withdrew
44	50	Larry Foyt	A. J. Foyt Enterprises	Dodge
45	27	Scott Wimmer	Bill Davis Racing	Chevrolet
46	89	Morgan Shepherd	Shepherd Racing Ventures	Ford
47	79	Billy Bigley	Arnold Motorsports	Dodge
48	44	Christian Fittipaldi	Petty Enterprises	Dodge
49	71	Tim Sauter	Marcis Auto Racing	Chevrolet
WD	79	Rich Bickle	Conely Racing	Chevrolet
WD	91	Shane Hmiel	Evernham Motorsports	Dodge
Official starting lineup

== Race results ==
Fin	St	#	Driver	Team	Make	Laps	Led	Status	Pts	Winnings
1	5	12	Ryan Newman	Penske Racing South	Dodge	400	106	running	180	$160,460
2	25	19	Jeremy Mayfield	Evernham Motorsports	Dodge	400	0	running	170	$140,635
3	11	20	Tony Stewart	Joe Gibbs Racing	Chevrolet	400	97	running	170	$153,408
4	3	29	Kevin Harvick	Richard Childress Racing	Chevrolet	400	133	running	170	$119,533
5	6	24	Jeff Gordon	Hendrick Motorsports	Chevrolet	400	14	running	160	$123,923
6	18	42	Jamie McMurray	Chip Ganassi Racing	Dodge	400	0	running	150	$71,890
7	19	16	Greg Biffle	Roush Racing	Ford	400	0	running	146	$66,440
8	4	48	Jimmie Johnson	Hendrick Motorsports	Chevrolet	400	0	running	142	$79,940
9	1	17	Matt Kenseth	Roush Racing	Ford	400	1	running	143	$79,840
10	14	2	Rusty Wallace	Penske Racing South	Dodge	400	0	running	134	$98,707
11	23	21	Ricky Rudd	Wood Brothers Racing	Ford	400	0	running	130	$87,155
12	13	99	Jeff Burton	Roush Racing	Ford	400	0	running	127	$96,007
13	17	40	Sterling Marlin	Chip Ganassi Racing	Dodge	400	1	running	129	$102,540
14	15	9	Bill Elliott	Evernham Motorsports	Dodge	400	0	running	121	$94,673
15	29	7	Jimmy Spencer	Ultra Motorsports	Dodge	400	0	running	118	$75,890
16	41	43	Jeff Green	Petty Enterprises	Dodge	400	0	running	115	$99,818
17	33	54	Todd Bodine	BelCar Racing	Ford	400	0	running	112	$71,740
18	27	88	Dale Jarrett	Robert Yates Racing	Ford	400	0	running	109	$100,703
19	20	38	Elliott Sadler	Robert Yates Racing	Ford	400	0	running	106	$92,490
20	9	5	Terry Labonte	Hendrick Motorsports	Chevrolet	399	0	running	103	$86,346
21	26	10	Johnny Benson Jr.	MB2 Motorsports	Pontiac	399	0	running	100	$84,490
22	16	6	Mark Martin	Roush Racing	Ford	398	0	running	97	$91,323
23	12	31	Robby Gordon	Richard Childress Racing	Chevrolet	398	0	running	94	$83,327
24	28	77	Dave Blaney	Jasper Motorsports	Ford	398	0	running	91	$75,490
25	37	0	Jason Leffler	Haas CNC Racing	Pontiac	398	0	running	88	$57,215
26	32	30	Steve Park	Richard Childress Racing	Chevrolet	397	0	running	85	$64,165
27	40	4	Kevin Lepage	Morgan–McClure Motorsports	Pontiac	397	0	running	82	$61,904
28	31	23	Kenny Wallace	Bill Davis Racing	Dodge	397	0	running	79	$53,340
29	21	22	Ward Burton	Bill Davis Racing	Dodge	397	0	running	76	$89,246
30	39	74	Tony Raines	BACE Motorsports	Chevrolet	395	0	running	73	$53,540
31	8	18	Bobby Labonte	Joe Gibbs Racing	Chevrolet	395	0	running	70	$97,948
32	36	45	Kyle Petty	Petty Enterprises	Dodge	394	0	running	67	$60,705
33	38	49	Ken Schrader	BAM Racing	Dodge	393	0	running	64	$53,455
34	30	1	John Andretti	Dale Earnhardt, Inc.	Chevrolet	393	0	running	61	$77,532
35	42	37	Derrike Cope	Quest Motor Racing	Chevrolet	393	0	running	58	$52,130
36	35	41	Casey Mears	Chip Ganassi Racing	Dodge	392	0	running	55	$60,000
37	2	8	Dale Earnhardt Jr.	Dale Earnhardt, Inc.	Chevrolet	362	48	crash	57	$97,792
38	7	97	Kurt Busch	Roush Racing	Ford	347	0	engine	49	$71,750
39	43	02	Hermie Sadler	SCORE Motorsports	Pontiac	257	0	engine	46	$51,635
40	22	32	Ricky Craven	PPI Motorsports	Pontiac	249	0	engine	43	$59,465
41	34	01	Mike Skinner	MB2 Motorsports	Pontiac	195	0	engine	40	$51,325
42	10	15	Michael Waltrip	Dale Earnhardt, Inc.	Chevrolet	171	0	engine	37	$69,200
43	24	25	Joe Nemechek	Hendrick Motorsports	Chevrolet	78	0	crash	34	$51,330
Official race results

Previous race: 2003 Sylvania 300	NASCAR Winston Cup Series; 2003 season	Next race: 2003 Banquet 400
