= 2003 Bass Pro Shops MBNA 500 (October) =

33rd race of the 2003 NASCAR Winston Cup Series

Race details
- Race 33 of 36 in the 2003 NASCAR Winston Cup Series
- The 2003 Bass Pro Shops MBNA 500 program cover.
- Date: October 26–27 2003
- Official name: 44th Annual Bass Pro Shops MBNA 500
- Location: Hampton, Georgia, Atlanta Motor Speedway
- Course: Permanent racing facility
- Course length: 1.54 miles (2.48 km)
- Distance: 325 laps, 500.5 mi (805.476 km)
- Scheduled distance: 325 laps, 500.5 mi (805.476 km)
- Average speed: 127.769 miles per hour (205.624 km/h)

Pole position
Driver	Ryan Newman	Penske Racing South
- Time: 28.534

Most laps led
Driver	Tony Stewart	Joe Gibbs Racing
- Laps: 109

Winner
No. 24	Jeff Gordon	Hendrick Motorsports

Television in the United States
- Network: NBC (Sunday) TNT (Monday)
- Announcers: Allen Bestwick, Benny Parsons, Wally Dallenbach Jr.

Radio in the United States
- Radio: Performance Racing Network

The 2003 Bass Pro Shops MBNA 500 was the 33rd stock car race of the 2003 NASCAR Winston Cup Series season and the forty-fourth iteration of the event. The race was held over two days from Sunday, October 26, 2003, to Monday, October 27 due to rain on lap 39 on Sunday, forcing the delay of the event. The race was held in Hampton, Georgia at Atlanta Motor Speedway, a 1.54 miles (2.48 km) permanent asphalt quad-oval intermediate speedway. The race took the scheduled 325 laps to complete. At race's end, Hendrick Motorsports driver Jeff Gordon would win under caution when with three laps to go, Dale Earnhardt Jr. bumped Ryan Newman into the wall. The win was Gordon's 64th career NASCAR Winston Cup Series win and his third of the season. To fill out the podium, Tony Stewart of Joe Gibbs Racing and Jimmie Johnson of Hendrick Motorsports would finish second and third, respectively.

== Background ==
The layout of Atlanta Motor Speedway, the venue where the race was held.

Atlanta Motor Speedway (formerly Atlanta International Raceway) is a track in Hampton, Georgia, 20 miles (32 km) south of Atlanta. It is a 1.54-mile (2.48 km) quad-oval track with a seating capacity of 111,000. It opened in 1960 as a 1.5-mile (2.4 km) standard oval. In 1994, 46 condominiums were built over the northeastern side of the track. In 1997, to standardize the track with Speedway Motorsports' other two 1.5-mile (2.4 km) ovals, the entire track was almost completely rebuilt. The frontstretch and backstretch were swapped, and the configuration of the track was changed from oval to quad-oval. The project made the track one of the fastest on the NASCAR circuit.

=== Entry list ===
#	Driver	Team	Make
0	Jason Leffler	Haas CNC Racing	Pontiac
00	Buckshot Jones	Michael Waltrip Racing	Chevrolet
1	John Andretti	Dale Earnhardt, Inc.	Chevrolet
01	Joe Nemechek	MB2 Motorsports	Pontiac
2	Rusty Wallace	Penske Racing South	Dodge
02	Hermie Sadler	SCORE Motorsports	Chevrolet
4	Kevin Lepage	Morgan–McClure Motorsports	Pontiac
5	Terry Labonte	Hendrick Motorsports	Chevrolet
6	Mark Martin	Roush Racing	Ford
7	Jimmy Spencer	Ultra Motorsports	Dodge
8	Dale Earnhardt Jr.	Dale Earnhardt, Inc.	Chevrolet
9	Bill Elliott	Evernham Motorsports	Dodge
09	Mike Wallace	Phoenix Racing	Dodge
10	Johnny Benson Jr.	MB2 Motorsports	Pontiac
12	Ryan Newman	Penske Racing South	Dodge
14	Larry Foyt	A. J. Foyt Enterprises	Dodge
15	Michael Waltrip	Dale Earnhardt, Inc.	Chevrolet
16	Greg Biffle	Roush Racing	Ford
17	Matt Kenseth	Roush Racing	Ford
18	Bobby Labonte	Joe Gibbs Racing	Chevrolet
19	Jeremy Mayfield	Evernham Motorsports	Dodge
20	Tony Stewart	Joe Gibbs Racing	Chevrolet
21	Ricky Rudd	Wood Brothers Racing	Ford
22	Scott Wimmer	Bill Davis Racing	Dodge
23	Kenny Wallace	Bill Davis Racing	Dodge
24	Jeff Gordon	Hendrick Motorsports	Chevrolet
25	Joe Nemechek	Hendrick Motorsports	Chevrolet
27	Shelby Howard	Bill Davis Racing	Chevrolet
29	Kevin Harvick	Richard Childress Racing	Chevrolet
30	Steve Park	Richard Childress Racing	Chevrolet
31	Robby Gordon	Richard Childress Racing	Chevrolet
32	Ricky Craven	PPI Motorsports	Pontiac
35	Bobby Hamilton Jr.	Team Rensi Motorsports	Ford
37	Derrike Cope	Quest Motor Racing	Chevrolet
38	Elliott Sadler	Robert Yates Racing	Ford
40	Sterling Marlin	Chip Ganassi Racing	Dodge
41	Casey Mears	Chip Ganassi Racing	Dodge
42	Jamie McMurray	Chip Ganassi Racing	Dodge
43	Jeff Green	Petty Enterprises	Dodge
45	Kyle Petty	Petty Enterprises	Dodge
48	Jimmie Johnson	Hendrick Motorsports	Chevrolet
49	Ken Schrader	BAM Racing	Dodge
54	Todd Bodine	BelCar Motorsports	Ford
74	Tony Raines	BACE Motorsports	Chevrolet
77	Dave Blaney	Jasper Motorsports	Ford
79	Billy Bigley	Arnold Motorsports	Dodge
88	Dale Jarrett	Robert Yates Racing	Ford
89	Morgan Shepherd*	Shepherd Racing Ventures	Ford
97	Kurt Busch	Roush Racing	Ford
99	Jeff Burton	Roush Racing	Ford
Official entry list

*Withdrew.

== Practice ==
=== First practice ===
The first practice session was held on Friday, October 24, at 3:20 PM EST, and would last for 2 hours. Ryan Newman of Penske Racing South would set the fastest time in the session, with a lap of 28.688 and an average speed of 193.251 miles per hour (311.007 km/h).

Pos.	#	Driver	Team	Make	Time	Speed
1	12	Ryan Newman	Penske Racing South	Dodge	28.688	193.251
2	25	Brian Vickers	Hendrick Motorsports	Chevrolet	28.836	192.260
3	38	Elliott Sadler	Robert Yates Racing	Ford	28.950	191.503
Full first practice results

=== Second practice ===
The second practice session was held on Saturday, October 25, at 9:30 AM EST, and would last for 45 minutes. Kevin Harvick of Richard Childress Racing would set the fastest time in the session, with a lap of 29.218 and an average speed of 189.746 miles per hour (305.367 km/h).

Pos.	#	Driver	Team	Make	Time	Speed
1	29	Kevin Harvick	Richard Childress Racing	Chevrolet	29.218	189.746
2	12	Ryan Newman	Penske Racing South	Dodge	29.256	189.500
3	9	Bill Elliott	Evernham Motorsports	Dodge	29.475	188.092
Full second practice results

=== Third and final practice ===
The third and final practice session, sometimes referred to as Happy Hour, was held on Saturday, October 25, at 11:10 AM EST, and would last for 45 minutes. Kurt Busch of Roush Racing would set the fastest time in the session, with a lap of 29.600 and an average speed of 187.297 miles per hour (301.425 km/h).

Pos.	#	Driver	Team	Make	Time	Speed
1	97	Kurt Busch	Roush Racing	Ford	29.600	187.297
2	35	Bobby Hamilton Jr.	Team Rensi Motorsports	Ford	29.642	187.032
3	2	Rusty Wallace	Penske Racing South	Dodge	29.720	186.541
Full Happy Hour practice results

== Qualifying ==
Qualifying was held on Friday, October 24, at 7:05 PM EST. Each driver would have two laps to set a fastest time; the fastest of the two would count as their official qualifying lap. Positions 1-36 would be decided on time, while positions 37-43 would be based on provisionals. Six spots are awarded by the use of provisionals based on owner's points. The seventh is awarded to a past champion who has not otherwise qualified for the race. If no past champ needs the provisional, the next team in the owner points will be awarded a provisional.

Ryan Newman of Penske Racing South would win the pole, setting a time of 29.938 and an average speed of 180.373 miles per hour (290.282 km/h).

Six drivers would fail to qualify: Jeff Green, Buckshot Jones, Larry Foyt, Mike Wallace, Billy Bigley, and Shelby Howard.

=== Full qualifying results ===
Pos.	#	Driver	Team	Make	Time	Speed
1	12	Ryan Newman	Penske Racing South	Dodge	28.534	194.294
2	18	Bobby Labonte	Joe Gibbs Racing	Chevrolet	28.575	194.016
3	8	Dale Earnhardt Jr.	Dale Earnhardt, Inc.	Chevrolet	28.678	193.319
4	25	Brian Vickers	Hendrick Motorsports	Chevrolet	28.685	193.272
5	9	Bill Elliott	Evernham Motorsports	Dodge	28.730	192.969
6	38	Elliott Sadler	Robert Yates Racing	Ford	28.854	192.140
7	54	Todd Bodine	BelCar Motorsports	Ford	28.903	191.814
8	01	Joe Nemechek	MB2 Motorsports	Pontiac	28.904	191.807
9	48	Jimmie Johnson	Hendrick Motorsports	Chevrolet	28.914	191.741
10	29	Kevin Harvick	Richard Childress Racing	Chevrolet	28.918	191.714
11	1	John Andretti	Dale Earnhardt, Inc.	Chevrolet	28.944	191.542
12	4	Kevin Lepage	Morgan–McClure Motorsports	Pontiac	28.977	191.324
13	15	Michael Waltrip	Dale Earnhardt, Inc.	Chevrolet	29.005	191.139
14	41	Casey Mears	Chip Ganassi Racing	Dodge	29.023	191.021
15	19	Jeremy Mayfield	Evernham Motorsports	Dodge	29.031	190.968
16	31	Robby Gordon	Richard Childress Racing	Chevrolet	29.039	190.916
17	97	Kurt Busch	Roush Racing	Ford	29.044	190.883
18	42	Jamie McMurray	Chip Ganassi Racing	Dodge	29.057	190.797
19	24	Jeff Gordon	Hendrick Motorsports	Chevrolet	29.109	190.457
20	30	Steve Park	Richard Childress Racing	Chevrolet	29.130	190.319
21	2	Rusty Wallace	Penske Racing South	Dodge	29.186	189.954
22	7	Jimmy Spencer	Ultra Motorsports	Dodge	29.200	189.863
23	37	Derrike Cope	Quest Motor Racing	Chevrolet	29.201	189.857
24	20	Tony Stewart	Joe Gibbs Racing	Chevrolet	29.225	189.701
25	45	Kyle Petty	Petty Enterprises	Dodge	29.249	189.545
26	32	Ricky Craven	PPI Motorsports	Pontiac	29.261	189.467
27	16	Greg Biffle	Roush Racing	Ford	29.272	189.396
28	23	Kenny Wallace	Bill Davis Racing	Dodge	29.276	189.370
29	0	Ward Burton	Haas CNC Racing	Pontiac	29.286	189.305
30	10	Johnny Benson Jr.	MB2 Motorsports	Pontiac	29.293	189.260
31	88	Dale Jarrett	Robert Yates Racing	Ford	29.303	189.196
32	5	Terry Labonte	Hendrick Motorsports	Chevrolet	29.309	189.157
33	74	Tony Raines	BACE Motorsports	Chevrolet	29.331	189.015
34	02	Hermie Sadler	SCORE Motorsports	Chevrolet	29.392	188.623
35	77	Dave Blaney	Jasper Motorsports	Ford	29.409	188.514
36	35	Bobby Hamilton Jr.	Team Rensi Motorsports	Ford	29.412	188.495
Provisionals
37	17	Matt Kenseth	Roush Racing	Ford	29.731	186.472
38	99	Jeff Burton	Roush Racing	Ford	29.573	187.468
39	6	Mark Martin	Roush Racing	Ford	29.460	188.187
40	40	Sterling Marlin	Chip Ganassi Racing	Dodge	29.542	187.665
41	22	Scott Wimmer	Bill Davis Racing	Dodge	29.454	188.226
42	21	Ricky Rudd	Wood Brothers Racing	Ford	29.589	187.367
43	49	Ken Schrader	BAM Racing	Dodge	29.481	188.053
Failed to qualify or withdrew
44	43	Jeff Green	Petty Enterprises	Dodge	29.445	188.283
45	00	Buckshot Jones	Michael Waltrip Racing	Chevrolet	29.557	187.570
46	14	Larry Foyt	A. J. Foyt Enterprises	Dodge	29.605	187.266
47	09	Mike Wallace	Phoenix Racing	Dodge	29.922	185.282
48	79	Billy Bigley	Arnold Motorsports	Dodge	30.046	184.517
49	27	Shelby Howard	Bill Davis Racing	Chevrolet	30.518	181.663
WD	89	Morgan Shepherd	Shepherd Racing Ventures	Ford	—	—
Official qualifying results

== Race results ==
Fin	St	#	Driver	Team	Make	Laps	Led	Status	Pts	Winnings
1	19	24	Jeff Gordon	Hendrick Motorsports	Chevrolet	325	55	running	180	$249,978
2	24	20	Tony Stewart	Joe Gibbs Racing	Chevrolet	325	109	running	180	$207,678
3	9	48	Jimmie Johnson	Hendrick Motorsports	Chevrolet	325	1	running	170	$122,800
4	5	9	Bill Elliott	Evernham Motorsports	Dodge	325	0	running	160	$133,833
5	2	18	Bobby Labonte	Joe Gibbs Racing	Chevrolet	325	66	running	160	$133,383
6	3	8	Dale Earnhardt Jr.	Dale Earnhardt, Inc.	Chevrolet	325	32	running	155	$121,692
7	15	19	Jeremy Mayfield	Evernham Motorsports	Dodge	325	0	running	146	$89,200
8	17	97	Kurt Busch	Roush Racing	Ford	325	3	running	147	$110,475
9	22	7	Jimmy Spencer	Ultra Motorsports	Dodge	325	2	running	143	$92,450
10	8	01	Joe Nemechek	MB2 Motorsports	Pontiac	325	0	running	134	$92,225
11	37	17	Matt Kenseth	Roush Racing	Ford	325	0	running	130	$95,825
12	31	88	Dale Jarrett	Robert Yates Racing	Ford	325	0	running	127	$115,403
13	29	0	Ward Burton	Haas CNC Racing	Pontiac	325	0	running	99	$74,125
14	12	4	Kevin Lepage	Morgan–McClure Motorsports	Pontiac	325	1	running	126	$78,550
15	18	42	Jamie McMurray	Chip Ganassi Racing	Dodge	324	0	running	118	$74,400
16	40	40	Sterling Marlin	Chip Ganassi Racing	Dodge	324	0	running	115	$111,150
17	6	38	Elliott Sadler	Robert Yates Racing	Ford	324	1	running	117	$105,300
18	33	74	Tony Raines	BACE Motorsports	Chevrolet	324	1	running	114	$70,550
19	21	2	Rusty Wallace	Penske Racing South	Dodge	324	0	running	106	$104,692
20	10	29	Kevin Harvick	Richard Childress Racing	Chevrolet	324	41	running	108	$110,753
21	16	31	Robby Gordon	Richard Childress Racing	Chevrolet	324	0	running	100	$94,712
22	11	1	John Andretti	Dale Earnhardt, Inc.	Chevrolet	324	0	running	97	$94,062
23	38	99	Jeff Burton	Roush Racing	Ford	324	0	running	94	$102,442
24	30	10	Johnny Benson Jr.	MB2 Motorsports	Pontiac	323	0	running	91	$94,475
25	25	45	Kyle Petty	Petty Enterprises	Dodge	323	0	running	88	$75,725
26	43	49	Ken Schrader	BAM Racing	Dodge	323	0	running	85	$67,025
27	36	35	Bobby Hamilton Jr.	Team Rensi Motorsports	Ford	323	0	running	82	$63,575
28	14	41	Casey Mears	Chip Ganassi Racing	Dodge	321	0	running	79	$82,864
29	1	12	Ryan Newman	Penske Racing South	Dodge	320	13	crash	81	$107,900
30	28	23	Kenny Wallace	Bill Davis Racing	Dodge	320	0	running	73	$66,585
31	42	21	Ricky Rudd	Wood Brothers Racing	Ford	319	0	running	70	$73,425
32	41	22	Scott Wimmer	Bill Davis Racing	Dodge	316	0	running	67	$98,801
33	32	5	Terry Labonte	Hendrick Motorsports	Chevrolet	316	0	running	64	$89,531
34	27	16	Greg Biffle	Roush Racing	Ford	314	0	transmission	61	$62,425
35	26	32	Ricky Craven	PPI Motorsports	Pontiac	222	0	crash	58	$70,300
36	20	30	Steve Park	Richard Childress Racing	Chevrolet	221	0	crash	55	$70,225
37	35	77	Dave Blaney	Jasper Motorsports	Ford	201	0	crash	52	$70,100
38	13	15	Michael Waltrip	Dale Earnhardt, Inc.	Chevrolet	170	0	engine	49	$80,050
39	39	6	Mark Martin	Roush Racing	Ford	159	0	engine	46	$95,833
40	23	37	Derrike Cope	Quest Motor Racing	Chevrolet	132	0	engine	43	$61,950
41	34	02	Hermie Sadler	SCORE Motorsports	Chevrolet	77	0	crash	40	$61,900
42	7	54	Todd Bodine	BelCar Motorsports	Ford	44	0	crash	37	$61,850
43	4	25	Brian Vickers	Hendrick Motorsports	Chevrolet	18	0	overheating	34	$62,059
Official race results

Previous race: 2003 Subway 500	NASCAR Winston Cup Series; 2003 season	Next race: 2003 Checker Auto Parts 500
