= 2003 Checker Auto Parts 500 =

34th race of the 2003 NASCAR Winston Cup Series

2003 Checker Auto Parts 500 presented by Havoline
Race details
- Race 34 of 36 in the 2003 NASCAR Winston Cup Series
- The 2003 Checker Auto Parts 500 program cover, featuring Matt Kenseth, Jeff Gordon, Bugs Bunny, and Daffy Duck promoting Looney Tunes: Back In Action.
- Date: November 2, 2003
- Official name: 16th Annual Checker Auto Parts 500 presented by Havoline
- Location: Avondale, Arizona, Phoenix International Raceway
- Course: Permanent racing facility
- Course length: 1 miles (1.6 km)
- Distance: 312 laps, 312 mi (502.115 km)
- Average speed: 93.984 miles per hour (151.253 km/h)
- Attendance: 100,000

Pole position
Driver	Ryan Newman	Penske Racing South
- Time: 26.931

Most laps led
Driver	Kurt Busch	Roush Racing
- Laps: 98

Winner
No. 8	Dale Earnhardt Jr.	Dale Earnhardt, Inc.

Television in the United States
- Network: NBC
- Announcers: Allen Bestwick, Benny Parsons, Wally Dallenbach Jr.

Radio in the United States
- Radio: Motor Racing Network

The 2003 Checker Auto Parts 500 presented by Havoline was the 34th stock car race of the 2003 NASCAR Winston Cup Series season and the 16th iteration of the event. The race was held on Sunday, November 2, 2003, before an audience of 100,000 in Avondale, Arizona at Phoenix International Raceway, a 1-mile (1.6 km) permanent low-banked tri-oval race track. The race took the scheduled 312 laps to complete. Within the final laps of the race, Dale Earnhardt, Inc. driver Dale Earnhardt Jr. would manage to defend the field on the final restart with nine to go to take his ninth career NASCAR Winston Cup Series victory and his second and final victory of the season. To fill out the top three, Hendrick Motorsports driver Jimmie Johnson and Penske Racing South driver Ryan Newman would finish second and third, respectively.

Heading into the penultimate race of the 2003 NASCAR Winston Cup Series season, the 2003 Pop Secret Microwave Popcorn 400, Roush Racing driver Matt Kenseth was considered the heavy favorite that season's driver's championship, only needing a seventh-place finish in the race to clinch the championship.

== Background ==
The layout of Phoenix International Raceway, the venue where the race was held.

Phoenix International Raceway is a one-mile, low-banked tri-oval race track located in Avondale, Arizona. It is named after the nearby metropolitan area of Phoenix. The motorsport track opened in 1964 and currently hosts two NASCAR race weekends annually. PIR has also hosted the IndyCar Series, CART, USAC and the Rolex Sports Car Series. The raceway is currently owned and operated by International Speedway Corporation.

The raceway was originally constructed with a 2.5 mi (4.0 km) road course that ran both inside and outside of the main tri-oval. In 1991 the track was reconfigured with the current 1.51 mi (2.43 km) interior layout. PIR has an estimated grandstand seating capacity of around 67,000. Lights were installed around the track in 2004 following the addition of a second annual NASCAR race weekend.

=== Entry list ===
- (R) denotes rookie driver.

#	Driver	Team	Make
0	Ward Burton	Haas CNC Racing	Pontiac
1	John Andretti	Dale Earnhardt, Inc.	Chevrolet
01	Joe Nemechek	MB2 Motorsports	Pontiac
2	Rusty Wallace	Penske Racing South	Dodge
02	Brandon Ash	Ash Motorsports	Ford
4	Kevin Lepage	Morgan–McClure Motorsports	Pontiac
5	Terry Labonte	Hendrick Motorsports	Chevrolet
6	Mark Martin	Roush Racing	Ford
7	Jimmy Spencer	Ultra Motorsports	Dodge
8	Dale Earnhardt Jr.	Dale Earnhardt, Inc.	Chevrolet
9	Bill Elliott	Evernham Motorsports	Dodge
09	Mike Wallace	Phoenix Racing	Dodge
10	Johnny Benson Jr.	MB2 Motorsports	Pontiac
12	Ryan Newman	Penske Racing South	Dodge
14	Larry Foyt (R)	A. J. Foyt Enterprises	Dodge
15	Michael Waltrip	Dale Earnhardt, Inc.	Chevrolet
16	Greg Biffle (R)	Roush Racing	Ford
17	Matt Kenseth	Roush Racing	Ford
18	Bobby Labonte	Joe Gibbs Racing	Chevrolet
19	Jeremy Mayfield	Evernham Motorsports	Dodge
20	Tony Stewart	Joe Gibbs Racing	Chevrolet
21	Ricky Rudd	Wood Brothers Racing	Ford
22	Scott Wimmer	Bill Davis Racing	Dodge
23	Kenny Wallace	Bill Davis Racing	Dodge
24	Jeff Gordon	Hendrick Motorsports	Chevrolet
25	Brian Vickers	Hendrick Motorsports	Chevrolet
29	Kevin Harvick	Richard Childress Racing	Chevrolet
30	Steve Park	Richard Childress Racing	Chevrolet
31	Robby Gordon	Richard Childress Racing	Chevrolet
32	Ricky Craven	PPI Motorsports	Pontiac
37	Derrike Cope	Quest Motor Racing	Chevrolet
38	Elliott Sadler	Robert Yates Racing	Ford
40	Sterling Marlin	Chip Ganassi Racing	Dodge
41	Casey Mears (R)	Chip Ganassi Racing	Dodge
42	Jamie McMurray (R)	Chip Ganassi Racing	Dodge
43	Jeff Green	Petty Enterprises	Dodge
45	Kyle Petty	Petty Enterprises	Dodge
48	Jimmie Johnson	Hendrick Motorsports	Chevrolet
49	Ken Schrader	BAM Racing	Dodge
54	Todd Bodine	BelCar Motorsports	Ford
74	Tony Raines (R)	BACE Motorsports	Chevrolet
77	Dave Blaney	Jasper Motorsports	Ford
88	Dale Jarrett	Robert Yates Racing	Ford
97	Kurt Busch	Roush Racing	Ford
99	Jeff Burton	Roush Racing	Ford
Official entry list

== Practice ==
=== First practice ===
The first practice session was held on Friday, October 31, at 12:20 PM EST. The session would last for two hours. Brian Vickers, driving for Hendrick Motorsports, would set the fastest time in the session, with a lap of 26.882 and an average speed of 133.919 miles per hour (215.522 km/h).

Pos.	#	Driver	Team	Make	Time	Speed
1	25	Brian Vickers	Hendrick Motorsports	Chevrolet	26.882	133.919
2	01	Joe Nemechek	MB2 Motorsports	Pontiac	26.949	133.586
3	12	Ryan Newman	Penske Racing South	Dodge	26.983	133.417
Full first practice results

=== Second practice ===
The second practice session was held on Saturday, November 1, at 11:30 AM EST. The session would last for 45 minutes. Jeff Gordon, driving for Hendrick Motorsports, would set the fastest time in the session, with a lap of 27.539 and an average speed of 130.724 miles per hour (210.380 km/h).

Pos.	#	Driver	Team	Make	Time	Speed
1	24	Jeff Gordon	Hendrick Motorsports	Chevrolet	27.539	130.724
2	12	Ryan Newman	Penske Racing South	Dodge	27.572	130.567
3	6	Mark Martin	Roush Racing	Ford	27.603	130.421
Full second practice results

=== Final practice ===
The final practice session, was held on Saturday, November 1, at 1:10 PM EST. The session would last for 45 minutes. Jeff Burton, driving for Roush Racing, would set the fastest time in the session, with a lap of 27.537 and an average speed of 130.733 miles per hour (210.394 km/h).

Pos.	#	Driver	Team	Make	Time	Speed
1	99	Jeff Burton	Roush Racing	Ford	27.537	130.733
2	16	Greg Biffle (R)	Roush Racing	Ford	27.541	130.714
3	25	Brian Vickers	Hendrick Motorsports	Chevrolet	27.596	130.454
Full Happy Hour practice results

== Qualifying ==
Qualifying was held on Friday, October 31, at 4:05 PM EST. Each driver would have two laps to set a fastest time; the fastest of the two would count as their official qualifying lap. Positions 1-36 would be decided on time, while positions 37-43 would be based on provisionals. Six spots are awarded by the use of provisionals based on owner's points. The seventh is awarded to a past champion who has not otherwise qualified for the race. If no past champ needs the provisional, the next team in the owner points will be awarded a provisional.

Ryan Newman, driving for Penske Racing South, would win the pole, setting a time of 26.931 and an average speed of 133.675 miles per hour (215.129 km/h).

Two drivers would fail to qualify: Derrike Cope and Brandon Ash.

=== Full qualifying results ===
Pos.	#	Driver	Team	Make	Time	Speed
1	12	Ryan Newman	Penske Racing South	Dodge	26.931	133.675
2	25	Brian Vickers	Hendrick Motorsports	Chevrolet	26.938	133.640
3	48	Jimmie Johnson	Hendrick Motorsports	Chevrolet	26.950	133.581
4	24	Jeff Gordon	Hendrick Motorsports	Chevrolet	26.983	133.417
5	2	Rusty Wallace	Penske Racing South	Dodge	27.037	133.151
6	20	Tony Stewart	Joe Gibbs Racing	Chevrolet	27.056	133.057
7	97	Kurt Busch	Roush Racing	Ford	27.056	133.057
8	77	Dave Blaney	Jasper Motorsports	Ford	27.062	133.028
9	41	Casey Mears (R)	Chip Ganassi Racing	Dodge	27.135	132.670
10	01	Joe Nemechek	MB2 Motorsports	Pontiac	27.147	132.611
11	8	Dale Earnhardt Jr.	Dale Earnhardt, Inc.	Chevrolet	27.148	132.607
12	6	Mark Martin	Roush Racing	Ford	27.161	132.543
13	29	Kevin Harvick	Richard Childress Racing	Chevrolet	27.173	132.484
14	38	Elliott Sadler	Robert Yates Racing	Ford	27.176	132.470
15	40	Sterling Marlin	Chip Ganassi Racing	Dodge	27.178	132.460
16	19	Jeremy Mayfield	Evernham Motorsports	Dodge	27.189	132.406
17	15	Michael Waltrip	Dale Earnhardt, Inc.	Chevrolet	27.191	132.397
18	9	Bill Elliott	Evernham Motorsports	Dodge	27.199	132.358
19	5	Terry Labonte	Hendrick Motorsports	Chevrolet	27.216	132.275
20	0	Ward Burton	Haas CNC Racing	Pontiac	27.232	132.197
21	54	Todd Bodine	BelCar Motorsports	Ford	27.237	132.173
22	42	Jamie McMurray (R)	Chip Ganassi Racing	Dodge	27.246	132.130
23	09	Mike Wallace	Phoenix Racing	Dodge	27.246	132.130
24	18	Bobby Labonte	Joe Gibbs Racing	Chevrolet	27.251	132.105
25	16	Greg Biffle (R)	Roush Racing	Ford	27.253	132.096
26	23	Kenny Wallace	Bill Davis Racing	Dodge	27.261	132.057
27	99	Jeff Burton	Roush Racing	Ford	27.268	132.023
28	22	Scott Wimmer	Bill Davis Racing	Dodge	27.275	131.989
29	7	Jimmy Spencer	Ultra Motorsports	Dodge	27.292	131.907
30	21	Ricky Rudd	Wood Brothers Racing	Ford	27.303	131.854
31	31	Robby Gordon	Richard Childress Racing	Chevrolet	27.335	131.699
32	14	Larry Foyt (R)	A. J. Foyt Enterprises	Dodge	27.379	131.488
33	1	John Andretti	Dale Earnhardt, Inc.	Chevrolet	27.403	131.372
34	49	Ken Schrader	BAM Racing	Dodge	27.407	131.353
35	10	Johnny Benson Jr.	MBV Motorsports	Pontiac	27.498	130.919
36	45	Kyle Petty	Petty Enterprises	Dodge	27.507	130.876
Provisionals
37	17	Matt Kenseth	Roush Racing	Ford	27.556	130.643
38	32	Ricky Craven	PPI Motorsports	Pontiac	27.657	130.166
39	88	Dale Jarrett	Robert Yates Racing	Ford	27.677	130.072
40	74	Tony Raines (R)	BACE Motorsports	Chevrolet	27.670	130.105
41	30	Steve Park	Richard Childress Racing	Chevrolet	27.702	129.954
42	43	Jeff Green	Petty Enterprises	Dodge	27.591	130.477
43	4	Kevin Lepage	Morgan–McClure Motorsports	Pontiac	27.639	130.251
Failed to qualify
44	37	Derrike Cope	Quest Motor Racing	Chevrolet	27.831	129.352
45	02	Brandon Ash	Ash Motorsports	Ford	28.669	125.571
Official qualifying results

== Race results ==
Fin	St	#	Driver	Team	Make	Laps	Led	Status	Pts	Winnings
1	11	8	Dale Earnhardt Jr.	Dale Earnhardt, Inc.	Chevrolet	312	87	running	180	$203,017
2	3	48	Jimmie Johnson	Hendrick Motorsports	Chevrolet	312	84	running	175	$173,625
3	1	12	Ryan Newman	Penske Racing South	Dodge	312	41	running	170	$152,625
4	7	97	Kurt Busch	Roush Racing	Ford	312	98	running	170	$142,585
5	17	15	Michael Waltrip	Dale Earnhardt, Inc.	Chevrolet	312	0	running	155	$100,925
6	37	17	Matt Kenseth	Roush Racing	Ford	312	0	running	150	$86,000
7	4	24	Jeff Gordon	Hendrick Motorsports	Chevrolet	312	0	running	146	$111,778
8	27	99	Jeff Burton	Roush Racing	Ford	312	0	running	142	$98,917
9	28	22	Scott Wimmer	Bill Davis Racing	Dodge	312	0	running	138	$95,656
10	12	6	Mark Martin	Roush Racing	Ford	312	0	running	134	$99,133
11	15	40	Sterling Marlin	Chip Ganassi Racing	Dodge	312	0	running	130	$100,000
12	22	42	Jamie McMurray (R)	Chip Ganassi Racing	Dodge	312	0	running	127	$59,900
13	2	25	Brian Vickers	Hendrick Motorsports	Chevrolet	312	0	running	124	$58,900
14	18	9	Bill Elliott	Evernham Motorsports	Dodge	312	0	running	121	$90,633
15	25	16	Greg Biffle (R)	Roush Racing	Ford	312	0	running	118	$56,130
16	33	1	John Andretti	Dale Earnhardt, Inc.	Chevrolet	312	0	running	115	$75,162
17	30	21	Ricky Rudd	Wood Brothers Racing	Ford	312	0	running	112	$76,875
18	6	20	Tony Stewart	Joe Gibbs Racing	Chevrolet	312	0	running	109	$102,128
19	41	74	Tony Raines (R)	BACE Motorsports	Chevrolet	312	0	running	106	$53,350
20	14	38	Elliott Sadler	Robert Yates Racing	Ford	312	0	running	103	$89,225
21	35	10	Johnny Benson Jr.	MBV Motorsports	Pontiac	312	0	running	100	$79,900
22	21	54	Todd Bodine	BelCar Motorsports	Ford	312	0	running	97	$65,575
23	43	4	Kevin Lepage	Morgan–McClure Motorsports	Pontiac	312	1	running	99	$60,250
24	8	77	Dave Blaney	Jasper Motorsports	Ford	312	0	running	91	$68,589
25	26	23	Kenny Wallace	Bill Davis Racing	Dodge	312	0	running	88	$52,375
26	23	09	Mike Wallace	Phoenix Racing	Dodge	312	0	running	85	$48,450
27	34	49	Ken Schrader	BAM Racing	Dodge	312	0	running	82	$51,625
28	32	14	Larry Foyt (R)	A. J. Foyt Enterprises	Dodge	312	0	running	79	$49,200
29	39	88	Dale Jarrett	Robert Yates Racing	Ford	312	0	running	76	$93,853
30	19	5	Terry Labonte	Hendrick Motorsports	Chevrolet	310	0	running	73	$77,706
31	10	01	Joe Nemechek	MB2 Motorsports	Pontiac	310	0	running	70	$50,925
32	31	31	Robby Gordon	Richard Childress Racing	Chevrolet	310	0	running	67	$75,862
33	5	2	Rusty Wallace	Penske Racing South	Dodge	305	0	running	64	$85,217
34	13	29	Kevin Harvick	Richard Childress Racing	Chevrolet	297	0	running	61	$86,603
35	36	45	Kyle Petty	Petty Enterprises	Dodge	280	0	engine	58	$55,300
36	24	18	Bobby Labonte	Joe Gibbs Racing	Chevrolet	267	0	running	55	$92,233
37	42	43	Jeff Green	Petty Enterprises	Dodge	266	0	engine	52	$82,803
38	38	32	Ricky Craven	PPI Motorsports	Pontiac	207	1	crash	54	$54,900
39	40	30	Steve Park	Richard Childress Racing	Chevrolet	206	0	crash	46	$54,775
40	29	7	Jimmy Spencer	Ultra Motorsports	Dodge	167	0	crash	0	$46,625
41	20	0	Ward Burton	Haas CNC Racing	Pontiac	167	0	crash	40	$47,185
42	9	41	Casey Mears (R)	Chip Ganassi Racing	Dodge	117	0	engine	37	$54,350
43	16	19	Jeremy Mayfield	Evernham Motorsports	Dodge	32	0	engine	34	$54,471
Official race results

Previous race: 2003 Bass Pro Shops MBNA 500 (October)	NASCAR Winston Cup Series; 2003 season	Next race: 2003 Pop Secret Microwave Popcorn 400
