= 2003 Pop Secret Microwave Popcorn 400 =

35th race of the 2003 NASCAR Winston Cup Series

Race details
- Race 35 of 36 in the 2003 NASCAR Winston Cup Series
- The 2003 Pop Secret Microwave Popcorn 400 program cover.
- Date: November 9, 2003
- Official name: 39th Annual Pop Secret Microwave Popcorn 400
- Location: Rockingham, North Carolina, North Carolina Speedway
- Course: Permanent racing facility
- Course length: 1.017 miles (1.636 km)
- Distance: 393 laps, 399.681 mi (643.224 km)
- Scheduled distance: 393 laps, 399.681 mi (643.224 km)
- Average speed: 111.677 miles per hour (179.727 km/h)
- Attendance: 60,000

Pole position
Driver	Ryan Newman	Penske Racing South
- Time: 23.533

Most laps led
Driver	Bill Elliott	Evernham Motorsports
- Laps: 140

Winner
No. 9	Bill Elliott	Evernham Motorsports

Television in the United States
- Network: TNT
- Announcers: Allen Bestwick, Benny Parsons, Wally Dallenbach Jr.

Radio in the United States
- Radio: Motor Racing Network

The 2003 Pop Secret Microwave Popcorn 400 was the 35th stock car race of the 2003 NASCAR Winston Cup Series season and the 39th and to date, final iteration of the event. The race was held on Sunday, November 9, 2003, before a crowd of 60,000 in Rockingham, North Carolina, at North Carolina Speedway, a 1.017 miles (1.637 km) permanent high-banked racetrack. The race took the scheduled 393 laps to complete. At race's end, Evernham Motorsports driver Bill Elliott charged to the front after starting from the rear to win his 44th and to date, final career NASCAR Winston Cup Series win and his first and only win of the season. Meanwhile, fourth-place finisher, Roush Racing driver Matt Kenseth, would lock up the championship, clinching the championship by points to win his first and to date, only NASCAR Winston Cup Series championship. To fill out the podium, Jimmie Johnson of Hendrick Motorsports and Jeremy Mayfield of Evernham Motorsports would finish second and third, respectively.

== Background ==
The layout of North Carolina Speedway, the venue where the race was held.

North Carolina Speedway was opened as a flat, one-mile oval on October 31, 1965. In 1969, the track was extensively reconfigured to a high-banked, D-shaped oval just over one mile in length. In 1997, North Carolina Motor Speedway merged with Penske Motorsports, and was renamed North Carolina Speedway. Shortly thereafter, the infield was reconfigured, and competition on the infield road course, mostly by the SCCA, was discontinued. Currently, the track is home to the Fast Track High Performance Driving School.

=== Entry list ===
#	Driver	Team	Make
0	Ward Burton	Haas CNC Racing	Pontiac
1	John Andretti	Dale Earnhardt, Inc.	Chevrolet
01	Joe Nemechek	MB2 Motorsports	Pontiac
2	Rusty Wallace	Penske Racing South	Dodge
02	Hermie Sadler	SCORE Motorsports	Chevrolet
4	Kevin Lepage	Morgan–McClure Motorsports	Pontiac
5	Terry Labonte	Hendrick Motorsports	Chevrolet
6	Mark Martin	Roush Racing	Ford
7	Jimmy Spencer	Ultra Motorsports	Dodge
8	Dale Earnhardt Jr.	Dale Earnhardt, Inc.	Chevrolet
9	Bill Elliott	Evernham Motorsports	Dodge
10	Johnny Benson Jr.	MB2 Motorsports	Pontiac
12	Ryan Newman	Penske Racing South	Dodge
14	Larry Foyt	A. J. Foyt Enterprises	Dodge
15	Michael Waltrip	Dale Earnhardt, Inc.	Chevrolet
16	Greg Biffle	Roush Racing	Ford
17	Matt Kenseth	Roush Racing	Ford
18	Bobby Labonte	Joe Gibbs Racing	Chevrolet
19	Jeremy Mayfield	Evernham Motorsports	Dodge
20	Tony Stewart	Joe Gibbs Racing	Chevrolet
21	Ricky Rudd	Wood Brothers Racing	Ford
22	Scott Wimmer	Bill Davis Racing	Dodge
23	Kenny Wallace	Bill Davis Racing	Dodge
24	Jeff Gordon	Hendrick Motorsports	Chevrolet
25	Joe Nemechek	Hendrick Motorsports	Chevrolet
29	Kevin Harvick	Richard Childress Racing	Chevrolet
30	Steve Park	Richard Childress Racing	Chevrolet
31	Robby Gordon	Richard Childress Racing	Chevrolet
32	Ricky Craven	PPI Motorsports	Pontiac
37	Derrike Cope	Quest Motor Racing	Chevrolet
38	Elliott Sadler	Robert Yates Racing	Ford
40	Sterling Marlin	Chip Ganassi Racing	Dodge
41	Casey Mears	Chip Ganassi Racing	Dodge
42	Jamie McMurray	Chip Ganassi Racing	Dodge
43	Jeff Green	Petty Enterprises	Dodge
45	Kyle Petty	Petty Enterprises	Dodge
48	Jimmie Johnson	Hendrick Motorsports	Chevrolet
49	Ken Schrader	BAM Racing	Dodge
54	Todd Bodine	BelCar Motorsports	Ford
71	Tim Sauter	Marcis Auto Racing	Chevrolet
74	Tony Raines	BACE Motorsports	Chevrolet
77	Dave Blaney	Jasper Motorsports	Ford
79	Rich Bickle	Conely Racing	Chevrolet
88	Dale Jarrett	Robert Yates Racing	Ford
97	Kurt Busch	Roush Racing	Ford
99	Jeff Burton	Roush Racing	Ford
Official entry list

== Practice ==
Originally, three practices were going to be held, with one on Friday and two on Saturday. However, rain would cancel one session on Saturday and delay the second Saturday session.

=== First practice ===
The first practice session was held on Friday, November 7, at 11:20 AM EST, and would last for 2 hours. Ryan Newman of Penske Racing South would set the fastest time in the session, with a lap of 23.533 and an average speed of 155.577 miles per hour (250.377 km/h).

Pos.	#	Driver	Team	Make	Time	Speed
1	12	Ryan Newman	Penske Racing South	Dodge	23.533	155.577
2	19	Jeremy Mayfield	Evernham Motorsports	Dodge	23.674	154.651
3	54	Todd Bodine	BelCar Motorsports	Ford	23.711	154.409
Full first practice results

=== Second and final practice ===
The second and final practice session, sometimes referred to as Happy Hour, was held on Saturday, November 8, at approximately 12:10 PM EST, and would last for 45 minutes. Jeff Burton of Roush Racing ould set the fastest time in the session, with a lap of 24.089 and an average speed of 151.986 miles per hour (244.598 km/h).

Pos.	#	Driver	Team	Make	Time	Speed
1	99	Jeff Burton	Roush Racing	Ford	24.089	151.986
2	2	Rusty Wallace	Penske Racing South	Dodge	24.206	151.252
3	18	Bobby Labonte	Joe Gibbs Racing	Chevrolet	24.209	151.233
Full Happy Hour practice results

== Qualifying ==
Qualifying was held on Friday, November 7, at 3:05 PM EST. Each driver would have two laps to set a fastest time; the fastest of the two would count as their official qualifying lap. Positions 1-36 would be decided on time, while positions 37-43 would be based on provisionals. Six spots are awarded by the use of provisionals based on owner's points. The seventh is awarded to a past champion who has not otherwise qualified for the race. If no past champ needs the provisional, the next team in the owner points will be awarded a provisional.

Ryan Newman of Penske Racing South would win the pole, setting a time of 23.533 and an average speed of 155.577 miles per hour (250.377 km/h).

Three drivers would fail to qualify: Hermie Sadler, Tim Sauter, and Rich Bickle.

=== Full qualifying results ===
Pos.	#	Driver	Team	Make	Time	Speed
1	12	Ryan Newman	Penske Racing South	Dodge	23.533	155.577
2	25	Brian Vickers	Hendrick Motorsports	Chevrolet	23.544	155.505
3	19	Jeremy Mayfield	Evernham Motorsports	Dodge	23.574	155.307
4	74	Tony Raines	BACE Motorsports	Chevrolet	23.574	155.307
5	9	Bill Elliott	Evernham Motorsports	Dodge	23.632	154.926
6	01	Joe Nemechek	MB2 Motorsports	Pontiac	23.645	154.840
7	2	Rusty Wallace	Penske Racing South	Dodge	23.680	154.611
8	7	Jimmy Spencer	Ultra Motorsports	Dodge	23.681	154.605
9	99	Jeff Burton	Roush Racing	Ford	23.734	154.260
10	16	Greg Biffle	Roush Racing	Ford	23.739	154.227
11	15	Michael Waltrip	Dale Earnhardt, Inc.	Chevrolet	23.744	154.195
12	6	Mark Martin	Roush Racing	Ford	23.744	154.195
13	0	Ward Burton	Haas CNC Racing	Pontiac	23.764	154.065
14	18	Bobby Labonte	Joe Gibbs Racing	Chevrolet	23.765	154.059
15	38	Elliott Sadler	Robert Yates Racing	Ford	23.768	154.039
16	24	Jeff Gordon	Hendrick Motorsports	Chevrolet	23.771	154.020
17	31	Robby Gordon	Richard Childress Racing	Chevrolet	23.774	154.000
18	48	Jimmie Johnson	Hendrick Motorsports	Chevrolet	23.778	153.974
19	97	Kurt Busch	Roush Racing	Ford	23.784	153.935
20	5	Terry Labonte	Hendrick Motorsports	Chevrolet	23.787	153.916
21	42	Jamie McMurray	Chip Ganassi Racing	Dodge	23.790	153.897
22	77	Dave Blaney	Jasper Motorsports	Ford	23.819	153.709
23	17	Matt Kenseth	Roush Racing	Ford	23.825	153.671
24	21	Ricky Rudd	Wood Brothers Racing	Ford	23.837	153.593
25	10	Johnny Benson Jr.	MB2 Motorsports	Pontiac	23.839	153.580
26	8	Dale Earnhardt Jr.	Dale Earnhardt, Inc.	Chevrolet	23.841	153.567
27	54	Todd Bodine	BelCar Motorsports	Ford	23.844	153.548
28	49	Ken Schrader	BAM Racing	Dodge	23.906	153.150
29	20	Tony Stewart	Joe Gibbs Racing	Chevrolet	23.917	153.079
30	32	Ricky Craven	PPI Motorsports	Pontiac	23.931	152.990
31	40	Sterling Marlin	Chip Ganassi Racing	Dodge	23.932	152.984
32	88	Dale Jarrett	Robert Yates Racing	Ford	23.935	152.964
33	45	Kyle Petty	Petty Enterprises	Dodge	23.976	152.703
34	29	Kevin Harvick	Richard Childress Racing	Chevrolet	23.979	152.684
35	23	Kenny Wallace	Bill Davis Racing	Dodge	23.992	152.601
36	1	John Andretti	Dale Earnhardt, Inc.	Chevrolet	23.997	152.569
Provisionals
37	22	Scott Wimmer	Bill Davis Racing	Dodge	24.083	152.024
38	30	Steve Park	Richard Childress Racing	Chevrolet	24.146	151.628
39	41	Casey Mears	Chip Ganassi Racing	Dodge	24.063	152.151
40	4	Kevin Lepage	Morgan–McClure Motorsports	Pontiac	24.032	152.347
41	43	Jeff Green	Petty Enterprises	Dodge	24.191	151.346
42	14	Larry Foyt	A. J. Foyt Enterprises	Dodge	24.136	151.690
43	37	Derrike Cope	Quest Motor Racing	Chevrolet	24.263	150.896
Failed to qualify
44	02	Hermie Sadler	SCORE Motorsports	Chevrolet	24.024	152.398
45	71	Tim Sauter	Marcis Auto Racing	Chevrolet	24.213	151.208
46	79	Rich Bickle	Conely Racing	Chevrolet	24.777	147.766
Official qualifying results

== Race results ==
Fin	St	#	Driver	Team	Make	Laps	Led	Status	Pts	Winnings
1	5	9	Bill Elliott	Evernham Motorsports	Dodge	393	140	running	185	$207,648
2	18	48	Jimmie Johnson	Hendrick Motorsports	Chevrolet	393	78	running	175	$105,590
3	3	19	Jeremy Mayfield	Evernham Motorsports	Dodge	393	96	running	170	$88,700
4	23	17	Matt Kenseth	Roush Racing	Ford	393	0	running	160	$92,650
5	1	12	Ryan Newman	Penske Racing South	Dodge	393	49	running	160	$98,785
6	4	74	Tony Raines	BACE Motorsports	Chevrolet	393	0	running	150	$61,775
7	9	99	Jeff Burton	Roush Racing	Ford	393	0	running	146	$91,442
8	14	18	Bobby Labonte	Joe Gibbs Racing	Chevrolet	393	0	running	142	$98,208
9	29	20	Tony Stewart	Joe Gibbs Racing	Chevrolet	393	0	running	138	$100,403
10	31	40	Sterling Marlin	Chip Ganassi Racing	Dodge	393	0	running	134	$99,425
11	10	16	Greg Biffle	Roush Racing	Ford	392	0	running	130	$56,675
12	20	5	Terry Labonte	Hendrick Motorsports	Chevrolet	392	0	running	127	$81,681
13	26	8	Dale Earnhardt Jr.	Dale Earnhardt, Inc.	Chevrolet	391	0	running	124	$92,042
14	8	7	Jimmy Spencer	Ultra Motorsports	Dodge	391	0	running	121	$72,825
15	34	29	Kevin Harvick	Richard Childress Racing	Chevrolet	391	0	running	118	$91,403
16	27	54	Todd Bodine	BelCar Motorsports	Ford	391	0	running	115	$69,475
17	19	97	Kurt Busch	Roush Racing	Ford	391	0	running	112	$82,925
18	13	0	Ward Burton	Haas CNC Racing	Pontiac	390	30	running	114	$53,325
19	41	43	Jeff Green	Petty Enterprises	Dodge	390	0	running	106	$88,703
20	17	31	Robby Gordon	Richard Childress Racing	Chevrolet	390	0	running	103	$79,612
21	15	38	Elliott Sadler	Robert Yates Racing	Ford	390	0	running	100	$86,325
22	16	24	Jeff Gordon	Hendrick Motorsports	Chevrolet	390	0	running	97	$96,203
23	7	2	Rusty Wallace	Penske Racing South	Dodge	390	0	running	94	$86,242
24	2	25	Brian Vickers	Hendrick Motorsports	Chevrolet	390	0	running	91	$52,175
25	6	01	Joe Nemechek	MB2 Motorsports	Pontiac	390	0	running	88	$61,875
26	37	22	Scott Wimmer	Bill Davis Racing	Dodge	389	0	running	85	$83,731
27	22	77	Dave Blaney	Jasper Motorsports	Ford	389	0	running	82	$66,849
28	42	14	Larry Foyt	A. J. Foyt Enterprises	Dodge	389	0	running	79	$47,260
29	25	10	Johnny Benson Jr.	MB2 Motorsports	Pontiac	388	0	running	76	$76,825
30	36	1	John Andretti	Dale Earnhardt, Inc.	Chevrolet	388	0	running	73	$75,142
31	35	23	Kenny Wallace	Bill Davis Racing	Dodge	387	0	running	70	$46,800
32	33	45	Kyle Petty	Petty Enterprises	Dodge	387	0	running	67	$54,675
33	39	41	Casey Mears	Chip Ganassi Racing	Dodge	386	0	running	64	$55,450
34	38	30	Steve Park	Richard Childress Racing	Chevrolet	386	0	running	61	$54,425
35	21	42	Jamie McMurray	Chip Ganassi Racing	Dodge	375	0	running	58	$46,300
36	28	49	Ken Schrader	BAM Racing	Dodge	374	0	crash	55	$46,255
37	11	15	Michael Waltrip	Dale Earnhardt, Inc.	Chevrolet	343	0	engine	52	$64,200
38	32	88	Dale Jarrett	Robert Yates Racing	Ford	339	0	engine	49	$91,923
39	30	32	Ricky Craven	PPI Motorsports	Pontiac	325	0	crash	46	$54,090
40	24	21	Ricky Rudd	Wood Brothers Racing	Ford	325	0	crash	43	$54,015
41	12	6	Mark Martin	Roush Racing	Ford	239	0	engine	40	$79,773
42	40	4	Kevin Lepage	Morgan–McClure Motorsports	Pontiac	130	0	engine	37	$45,860
43	43	37	Derrike Cope	Quest Motor Racing	Chevrolet	127	0	axle	34	$45,170
Official race results

Previous race: 2003 Checker Auto Parts 500	NASCAR Winston Cup Series; 2003 season	Next race: 2003 Ford 400
