= 2003 Pontiac Excitement 400 =

11th race of the 2003 NASCAR Winston Cup Series

Race details
- Race 11 of 36 in the 2003 NASCAR Winston Cup Series
- The 2003 Pontiac Excitement 400 program cover.
- Date: May 3, 2003
- Official name: 49th Annual Pontiac Excitement 400
- Location: Richmond, Virginia, Richmond International Raceway
- Course: Permanent racing facility
- Course length: 0.75 miles (1.21 km)
- Distance: 393 laps, 294.75 mi (474.354 km)
- Scheduled distance: 400 laps, 300 mi (482.803 km)
- Average speed: 86.783 miles per hour (139.664 km/h)
- Attendance: 110,000

Pole position
Driver	Terry Labonte	Hendrick Motorsports
- Time: 21.342

Most laps led
Driver	Joe Nemechek	Hendrick Motorsports
- Laps: 156

Winner
No. 25	Joe Nemechek	Hendrick Motorsports

Television in the United States
- Network: FX
- Announcers: Mike Joy, Larry McReynolds, Darrell Waltrip

Radio in the United States
- Radio: Motor Racing Network

The 2003 Pontiac Excitement 400 was the 11th stock car race of the 2003 NASCAR Winston Cup Series season and the 49th iteration of the event. The race was held on Saturday, May 3, 2003, before a crowd of 110,000 in Richmond, Virginia, at Richmond International Raceway, a 0.75 miles (1.21 km) D-shaped oval. The race was shortened from its scheduled 400 laps to 393 due to rain cutting the race short. At race's end, Joe Nemechek, driving for Hendrick Motorsports, would rally from the mid-pack and eventually win his third career NASCAR Winston Cup Series win and his first and only win of the season. To fill out the podium, Bobby Labonte of Joe Gibbs Racing and Dale Earnhardt Jr. of Dale Earnhardt, Inc. would finish second and third, respectively.

MB2 Motorsports driver Jerry Nadeau would suffer career-ending injuries in the second practice session of the race.

== Background ==
=== Entry list ===
- (R) denotes rookie driver.

#	Driver	Team	Make
0	Jack Sprague (R)	Haas CNC Racing	Pontiac
1	Steve Park	Dale Earnhardt, Inc.	Chevrolet
01	Jerry Nadeau*	MB2 Motorsports	Pontiac
2	Rusty Wallace	Penske Racing	Dodge
02	Hermie Sadler	SCORE Motorsports	Pontiac
4	Mike Skinner	Morgan–McClure Motorsports	Pontiac
5	Terry Labonte	Hendrick Motorsports	Chevrolet
6	Mark Martin	Roush Racing	Ford
7	Jimmy Spencer	Ultra Motorsports	Dodge
8	Dale Earnhardt Jr.	Dale Earnhardt, Inc.	Chevrolet
9	Bill Elliott	Evernham Motorsports	Dodge
10	Johnny Benson Jr.	MB2 Motorsports	Pontiac
11	Brett Bodine	Brett Bodine Racing	Ford
12	Ryan Newman	Penske Racing	Dodge
14	Larry Foyt (R)	A. J. Foyt Enterprises	Dodge
15	Michael Waltrip	Dale Earnhardt, Inc.	Chevrolet
16	Greg Biffle (R)	Roush Racing	Ford
17	Matt Kenseth	Roush Racing	Ford
18	Bobby Labonte	Joe Gibbs Racing	Chevrolet
19	Jeremy Mayfield	Evernham Motorsports	Dodge
20	Tony Stewart	Joe Gibbs Racing	Chevrolet
21	Ricky Rudd	Wood Brothers Racing	Ford
22	Ward Burton	Bill Davis Racing	Dodge
23	Kenny Wallace	Bill Davis Racing	Dodge
24	Jeff Gordon	Hendrick Motorsports	Chevrolet
25	Joe Nemechek	Hendrick Motorsports	Chevrolet
29	Kevin Harvick	Richard Childress Racing	Chevrolet
30	Jeff Green	Richard Childress Racing	Chevrolet
31	Robby Gordon	Richard Childress Racing	Chevrolet
32	Ricky Craven	PPI Motorsports	Pontiac
37	Derrike Cope	Quest Motor Racing	Chevrolet
38	Elliott Sadler	Robert Yates Racing	Ford
40	Sterling Marlin	Chip Ganassi Racing	Dodge
41	Casey Mears (R)	Chip Ganassi Racing	Dodge
42	Jamie McMurray (R)	Chip Ganassi Racing	Dodge
43	John Andretti	Petty Enterprises	Dodge
45	Kyle Petty	Petty Enterprises	Dodge
48	Jimmie Johnson	Hendrick Motorsports	Chevrolet
49	Ken Schrader	BAM Racing	Dodge
54	Todd Bodine	BelCar Motorsports	Ford
66	Hideo Fukuyama** (R)	BelCar Motorsports	Ford
74	Tony Raines (R)	BACE Motorsports	Chevrolet
77	Dave Blaney	Jasper Motorsports	Ford
88	Dale Jarrett	Robert Yates Racing	Ford
97	Kurt Busch	Roush Racing	Ford
99	Jeff Burton	Roush Racing	Ford
Official entry list

*Driver changed to Jason Keller after Nadeau crashed in second practice, leaving Nadeau critically injured and effectively ending Nadeau's racing career.

**Withdrew after crashing in first practice.

== Practice ==
=== First practice ===
The first practice session was held on Friday, May 2, at 11:20 AM EST, and would last for two hours. Dale Earnhardt Jr. of Dale Earnhardt, Inc. would set the fastest time in the session, with a lap of 21.230 and an average speed of 127.178 miles per hour (204.673 km/h).

Pos.	#	Driver	Team	Make	Time	Speed
1	8	Dale Earnhardt Jr.	Dale Earnhardt, Inc.	Chevrolet	21.230	127.178
2	18	Bobby Labonte	Joe Gibbs Racing	Chevrolet	21.249	127.065
3	48	Jimmie Johnson	Hendrick Motorsports	Chevrolet	21.259	127.005
Full first practice results

=== Second practice ===
The second practice session was held on Friday, May 2, at 4:45 PM EST, and would last for 45 minutes. Jeff Burton of Roush Racing would set the fastest time in the session, with a lap of 21.640 and an average speed of 124.769 miles per hour (200.796 km/h).

Pos.	#	Driver	Team	Make	Time	Speed
1	99	Jeff Burton	Roush Racing	Ford	21.640	124.769
2	25	Joe Nemechek	Hendrick Motorsports	Chevrolet	21.701	124.418
3	17	Matt Kenseth	Roush Racing	Ford	21.737	124.212
Full second practice results

=== Third and final practice ===
The third and final practice session, sometimes referred to as Happy Hour, was held on Friday, May 2, at 6:10 PM EST, and would last for 45 minutes. Jeff Burton of Roush Racing would set the fastest time in the session, with a lap of 21.640 and an average speed of 124.769 miles per hour (200.796 km/h).

Pos.	#	Driver	Team	Make	Time	Speed
1	99	Jeff Burton	Roush Racing	Ford	21.650	124.711
2	97	Kurt Busch	Roush Racing	Ford	21.658	124.665
3	23	Kenny Wallace	Bill Davis Racing	Dodge	21.678	124.550
Full Happy Hour practice results

== Qualifying ==
Qualifying was held on Friday, May 2, at 3:00 PM EST. Each driver would have two laps to set a fastest time; the fastest of the two would count as their official qualifying lap. Positions 1-36 would be decided on time, while positions 37-43 would be based on provisionals. Six spots are awarded by the use of provisionals based on owner's points. The seventh is awarded to a past champion who has not otherwise qualified for the race. If no past champ needs the provisional, the next team in the owner points will be awarded a provisional.

Terry Labonte of Hendrick Motorsports would win the pole, setting a time of 21.342 and an average speed of 126.511 miles per hour (203.600 km/h).

Two drivers would fail to qualify: Derrike Cope and Hermie Sadler.

=== Full qualifying results ===
Pos.	#	Driver	Team	Make	Time	Speed
1	5	Terry Labonte	Hendrick Motorsports	Chevrolet	21.342	126.511
2	25	Joe Nemechek	Hendrick Motorsports	Chevrolet	21.366	126.369
3	8	Dale Earnhardt Jr.	Dale Earnhardt, Inc.	Chevrolet	21.375	126.316
4	18	Bobby Labonte	Joe Gibbs Racing	Chevrolet	21.393	126.210
5	12	Ryan Newman	Penske Racing South	Dodge	21.417	126.068
6	24	Jeff Gordon	Hendrick Motorsports	Chevrolet	21.418	126.062
7	97	Kurt Busch	Roush Racing	Ford	21.423	126.033
8	45	Kyle Petty	Petty Enterprises	Dodge	21.423	126.033
9	20	Tony Stewart	Joe Gibbs Racing	Chevrolet	21.424	126.027
10	48	Jimmie Johnson	Hendrick Motorsports	Chevrolet	21.434	125.968
11	41	Casey Mears (R)	Chip Ganassi Racing	Dodge	21.439	125.939
12	01	Jerry Nadeau	MB2 Motorsports	Pontiac	21.446	125.898
13	10	Johnny Benson Jr.	MBV Motorsports	Pontiac	21.467	125.774
14	23	Kenny Wallace	Bill Davis Racing	Dodge	21.473	125.739
15	16	Greg Biffle (R)	Roush Racing	Ford	21.479	125.704
16	99	Jeff Burton	Roush Racing	Ford	21.499	125.587
17	2	Rusty Wallace	Penske Racing South	Dodge	21.504	125.558
18	17	Matt Kenseth	Roush Racing	Ford	21.510	125.523
19	19	Jeremy Mayfield	Evernham Motorsports	Dodge	21.515	125.494
20	22	Ward Burton	Bill Davis Racing	Dodge	21.516	125.488
21	40	Sterling Marlin	Chip Ganassi Racing	Dodge	21.520	125.465
22	42	Jamie McMurray (R)	Chip Ganassi Racing	Dodge	21.522	125.453
23	1	Steve Park	Dale Earnhardt, Inc.	Chevrolet	21.546	125.313
24	43	John Andretti	Petty Enterprises	Dodge	21.555	125.261
25	7	Jimmy Spencer	Ultra Motorsports	Dodge	21.563	125.215
26	4	Mike Skinner	Morgan–McClure Motorsports	Pontiac	21.563	125.215
27	21	Ricky Rudd	Wood Brothers Racing	Ford	21.570	125.174
28	9	Bill Elliott	Evernham Motorsports	Dodge	21.571	125.168
29	0	Jack Sprague (R)	Haas CNC Racing	Pontiac	21.574	125.151
30	6	Mark Martin	Roush Racing	Ford	21.581	125.110
31	77	Dave Blaney	Jasper Motorsports	Ford	21.584	125.093
32	31	Robby Gordon	Richard Childress Racing	Chevrolet	21.590	125.058
33	49	Ken Schrader	BAM Racing	Dodge	21.591	125.052
34	54	Todd Bodine	BelCar Motorsports	Ford	21.639	124.775
35	74	Tony Raines (R)	BACE Motorsports	Chevrolet	21.655	124.683
36	29	Kevin Harvick	Richard Childress Racing	Chevrolet	21.670	124.596
Provisionals
37	15	Michael Waltrip	Dale Earnhardt, Inc.	Chevrolet	21.679	124.545
38	32	Ricky Craven	PPI Motorsports	Pontiac	21.677	124.556
39	38	Elliott Sadler	Robert Yates Racing	Ford	21.876	123.423
40	88	Dale Jarrett	Robert Yates Racing	Ford	21.852	123.559
41	30	Jeff Green	Richard Childress Racing	Chevrolet	21.679	124.545
42	14	Larry Foyt (R)	A. J. Foyt Enterprises	Dodge	21.743	124.178
43	11	Brett Bodine	Brett Bodine Racing	Ford	21.962	122.940
Failed to qualify or withdrew
44	37	Derrike Cope	Quest Motor Racing	Chevrolet	21.946	123.029
45	02	Hermie Sadler	SCORE Motorsports	Pontiac	21.836	123.649
WD	66	Hideo Fukuyama (R)	BelCar Motorsports	Ford	—	—
Official qualifying results

== Race results ==
Fin.	St	#	Driver	Team	Make	Laps	Led	Status	Pts	Winnings
1	2	25	Joe Nemechek	Hendrick Motorsports	Chevrolet	393	156	running	185	$159,375
2	4	18	Bobby Labonte	Joe Gibbs Racing	Chevrolet	393	62	running	175	$157,758
3	3	8	Dale Earnhardt Jr.	Dale Earnhardt, Inc.	Chevrolet	393	5	running	170	$121,867
4	32	31	Robby Gordon	Richard Childress Racing	Chevrolet	393	29	running	165	$101,212
5	30	6	Mark Martin	Roush Racing	Ford	393	10	running	160	$102,533
6	36	29	Kevin Harvick	Richard Childress Racing	Chevrolet	393	12	running	155	$100,928
7	18	17	Matt Kenseth	Roush Racing	Ford	393	0	running	146	$73,675
8	7	97	Kurt Busch	Roush Racing	Ford	393	17	running	147	$89,925
9	16	99	Jeff Burton	Roush Racing	Ford	393	0	running	138	$90,342
10	17	2	Rusty Wallace	Penske Racing South	Dodge	393	0	running	134	$91,942
11	20	22	Ward Burton	Bill Davis Racing	Dodge	393	0	running	130	$90,781
12	37	15	Michael Waltrip	Dale Earnhardt, Inc.	Chevrolet	393	0	running	127	$69,910
13	21	40	Sterling Marlin	Chip Ganassi Racing	Dodge	393	0	running	124	$95,425
14	35	74	Tony Raines (R)	BACE Motorsports	Chevrolet	393	0	running	121	$51,325
15	13	10	Johnny Benson Jr.	MBV Motorsports	Pontiac	393	0	running	118	$82,435
16	6	24	Jeff Gordon	Hendrick Motorsports	Chevrolet	393	42	running	120	$97,228
17	15	16	Greg Biffle (R)	Roush Racing	Ford	393	0	running	112	$49,150
18	31	77	Dave Blaney	Jasper Motorsports	Ford	393	0	running	109	$76,000
19	10	48	Jimmie Johnson	Hendrick Motorsports	Chevrolet	393	0	running	106	$68,275
20	28	9	Bill Elliott	Evernham Motorsports	Dodge	393	6	running	108	$89,058
21	1	5	Terry Labonte	Hendrick Motorsports	Chevrolet	393	30	running	105	$83,456
22	22	42	Jamie McMurray (R)	Chip Ganassi Racing	Dodge	393	0	running	97	$47,975
23	34	54	Todd Bodine	BelCar Motorsports	Ford	393	0	running	94	$65,375
24	33	49	Ken Schrader	BAM Racing	Dodge	392	0	running	91	$58,100
25	19	19	Jeremy Mayfield	Evernham Motorsports	Dodge	392	0	running	88	$59,050
26	29	0	Jack Sprague (R)	Haas CNC Racing	Pontiac	392	0	running	85	$47,725
27	8	45	Kyle Petty	Petty Enterprises	Dodge	391	0	running	82	$58,700
28	11	41	Casey Mears (R)	Chip Ganassi Racing	Dodge	391	0	running	79	$66,864
29	14	23	Kenny Wallace	Bill Davis Racing	Dodge	390	0	crash	76	$50,250
30	24	43	John Andretti	Petty Enterprises	Dodge	390	0	running	73	$86,253
31	43	11	Brett Bodine	Brett Bodine Racing	Ford	389	0	running	70	$49,825
32	12	01	Jason Keller	MB2 Motorsports	Pontiac	388	0	running	67	$49,675
33	42	14	Larry Foyt (R)	A. J. Foyt Enterprises	Dodge	387	0	running	64	$49,625
34	27	21	Ricky Rudd	Wood Brothers Racing	Ford	378	0	crash	61	$57,075
35	26	4	Mike Skinner	Morgan–McClure Motorsports	Pontiac	378	0	crash	58	$47,425
36	40	88	Dale Jarrett	Robert Yates Racing	Ford	363	0	crash	55	$92,253
37	39	38	Elliott Sadler	Robert Yates Racing	Ford	338	0	running	52	$80,675
38	38	32	Ricky Craven	PPI Motorsports	Pontiac	287	0	crash	49	$54,375
39	5	12	Ryan Newman	Penske Racing South	Dodge	277	24	running	51	$76,185
40	41	30	Jeff Green	Richard Childress Racing	Chevrolet	267	0	crash	43	$54,230
41	9	20	Tony Stewart	Joe Gibbs Racing	Chevrolet	223	0	crash	40	$98,748
42	25	7	Jimmy Spencer	Ultra Motorsports	Dodge	139	0	crash	37	$46,110
43	23	1	Steve Park	Dale Earnhardt, Inc.	Chevrolet	42	0	crash	34	$71,502
Official race results

Previous race: 2003 Auto Club 500	NASCAR Winston Cup Series; 2003 season	Next race: 2003 Coca-Cola 600
