= 2003 Ford 400 =

Race details
- Race 36 of 36 in the 2003 NASCAR Winston Cup Series season
- Map of Homestead-Miami Speedway. Gray dashed lines are other courses. Gray solid line is another pit road option.
- Date: November 16, 2003
- Location: Homestead-Miami Speedway, Homestead, Florida, United States
- Course: Permanent racing facility
- Course length: 1.5 miles (2.4 km)
- Distance: 267 laps, 400.5 mi (644.5 km)
- Weather: Temperatures reaching up to 80.6 °F (27.0 °C); with wind speeds reaching up to 14 miles per hour (23 km/h)
- Average speed: 116.868 miles per hour (188.081 km/h)

Pole position
Driver	Jamie McMurray	Chip Ganassi Racing

Most laps led
Driver	Bill Elliott	Evernham Motorsports
- Laps: 189

Winner
No. 18	Bobby Labonte	Joe Gibbs Racing

Television in the United States
- Network: NBC
- Announcers: Allen Bestwick, Wally Dallenbach Jr., and Benny Parsons

The 2003 Ford 400 was a NASCAR Winston Cup Series racing event that took place on November 16, 2003, at Homestead–Miami Speedway in Homestead, Florida, United States. This was the last race ever for NASCAR with title sponsorship from Winston, breaking a partnership beginning in 1972. Starting in 2004, new series sponsor Nextel would take over. The race was also the final Cup Series won by Bobby Labonte.

== Summary ==
Jamie McMurray qualified for the pole position with a lap turned at 181.111 miles per hour (291.470 km/h). Ken Schrader, Kyle Petty, Mike Wallace, Derrike Cope, and Rich Bickle had all failed to qualify for the race. Kyle Busch was set to make his Cup Series debut in this race, driving the No. 60 Ditech Chevrolet Monte Carlo for Hendrick Motorsports, but was ejected from the event after NASCAR confiscated his car for pre-race inspection failures.

Bill Elliott dominated the race, leading 189 out of 267 laps, before cutting a tire and losing the lead on the final lap. Bobby Labonte would pass him and win the race, which would be his final NASCAR Winston Cup Series victory. Ten cautions were called, slowing the field for a total of 60 laps, while the lead changed 21 times between 12 drivers. Despite an engine failure on lap 28 which relegated him to a last-place finish, Matt Kenseth maintained his points lead over Jimmie Johnson and won the 2003 NASCAR Winston Cup Series championship.

This would be the last NASCAR Winston Cup Series race for Ron Hornaday Jr. until the 2015 Folds of Honor QuikTrip 500.

== Race results ==
Pos.	Car #	Driver	Make	Team
1	18	Bobby Labonte	Chevrolet	Joe Gibbs Racing
2	29	Kevin Harvick	Chevrolet	Richard Childress Racing
3	48	Jimmie Johnson	Chevrolet	Hendrick Motorsports
4	10	Johnny Benson	Pontiac	MB2 Motorsports
5	24	Jeff Gordon	Chevrolet	Hendrick Motorsports
6	19	Jeremy Mayfield	Dodge	Evernham Motorsports
7	20	Tony Stewart	Chevrolet	Joe Gibbs Racing
8	9	Bill Elliott	Dodge	Evernham Motorsports
9	42	Jamie McMurray (R)	Dodge	Chip Ganassi Racing with Felix Sabates
10	40	Sterling Marlin	Dodge	Chip Ganassi Racing with Felix Sabates
11	54	Todd Bodine	Ford	BelCar Motorsports
12	22	Scott Wimmer	Dodge	Bill Davis Racing
13	74	Tony Raines (R)	Chevrolet	BACE Motorsports
14	99	Jeff Burton	Ford	Roush Racing
15	5	Terry Labonte	Chevrolet	Hendrick Motorsports
16	14	Larry Foyt (R)	Dodge	A. J. Foyt Racing
17	01	Joe Nemechek	Pontiac	MB2 Motorsports
18	4	Kevin Lepage	Pontiac	Morgan–McClure Motorsports
19	30	Steve Park	Chevrolet	Richard Childress Racing
20	90	Ron Hornaday Jr.	Chevrolet	Richard Childress Racing
21	38	Elliott Sadler	Ford	Robert Yates Racing
22	23	Kenny Wallace	Dodge	Bill Davis Racing
23	2	Rusty Wallace	Dodge	Penske Racing
24	8	Dale Earnhardt Jr.	Chevrolet	Dale Earnhardt, Inc.
25	7	Jimmy Spencer	Dodge	Ultra Motorsports
26	88	Dale Jarrett	Ford	Robert Yates Racing
27	41	Casey Mears (R)	Dodge	Chip Ganassi Racing with Felix Sabates
28	77	Dave Blaney	Ford	Jasper Motorsports
29	32	Ricky Craven	Pontiac	PPI Motorsports
30	31	Robby Gordon	Chevrolet	Richard Childress Racing
31	21	Ricky Rudd	Ford	Wood Brothers Racing
32	0	Ward Burton	Pontiac	Haas CNC Racing
33	6	Mark Martin	Ford	Roush Racing
34	25	Brian Vickers	Chevrolet	Hendrick Motorsports
35	16	Greg Biffle (R)	Ford	Roush Racing
36	97	Kurt Busch	Ford	Roush Racing
37	12	Ryan Newman	Dodge	Penske Racing
38	02	Hermie Sadler	Chevrolet	SCORE Motorsports
39	00	Mike Skinner	Chevrolet	Michael Waltrip Racing
40	43	Jeff Green	Dodge	Petty Enterprises
41	15	Michael Waltrip	Chevrolet	Dale Earnhardt, Inc.
42	1	John Andretti	Chevrolet	Dale Earnhardt, Inc.
43	17	Matt Kenseth	Ford	Roush Racing

=== Failed to Qualify ===
- 49 - Ken Schrader
- 45 - Kyle Petty
- 09 - Mike Wallace
- 79 - Derrike Cope
- 78 - Rich Bickle
- 60 - Kyle Busch (withdrew after pre-race tech failure)

Preceded by 2003 Pop Secret Microwave Popcorn 400	NASCAR Winston/Nextel Cup Series Season; 2003-4	Succeeded by 2004 Daytona 500
