= 2006 Crown Royal 400 =

Race details
- Race 10 of 36 in the 2006 NASCAR Nextel Cup Series season
- 2006 Crown Royal 400 program cover
- Date: May 6, 2006
- Location: Richmond International Raceway in Richmond, Virginia
- Course: Permanent racing facility
- Course length: 0.75 miles (1.20 km)
- Distance: 400 laps, 300 mi (482.803 km)
- Average speed: 97.061 miles per hour (156.205 km/h)

Pole position
Driver	Greg Biffle	Roush Racing
- Time: 21.194

Most laps led
Driver	Kevin Harvick	Richard Childress Racing
- Laps: 272

Winner
No. 8	Dale Earnhardt Jr.	Dale Earnhardt, Inc.

Television in the United States
- Network: FX
- Announcers: Mike Joy, Darrell Waltrip and Larry McReynolds

The 2006 Crown Royal 400, NASCAR's tenth race of the 2006 season was held at Richmond International Raceway on May 6, 2006. Greg Biffle won the pole. This was the second impound race of the 2006 season and Dale Earnhardt Jr.'s final win driving for Dale Earnhardt, Inc. Earnhardt Jr. went win-less in 2007 before joining Hendrick Motorsports in 2008.

== Qualifying ==
Pos	Car #	Driver	Make	Speed	Time	Behind
1	16	Greg Biffle	Ford	127.395	21.194	0.000
2	6	Mark Martin	Ford	127.029	21.255	-0.061
3	42	Casey Mears	Dodge	126.862	21.283	-0.089
4	25	Brian Vickers	Chevrolet	126.648	21.319	-0.125
5	48	Jimmie Johnson	Chevrolet	126.576	21.331	-0.137
6	9	Kasey Kahne	Dodge	126.487	21.346	-0.152
7	11	Denny Hamlin	Chevrolet	126.393	21.362	-0.168
8	29	Kevin Harvick	Chevrolet	126.310	21.376	-0.182
9	99	Carl Edwards	Ford	126.310	21.376	-0.182
10	8	Dale Earnhardt Jr	Chevrolet	126.280	21.381	-0.187
11	17	Matt Kenseth	Ford	126.239	21.388	-0.194
12	45	Kyle Petty	Dodge	126.127	21.407	-0.213
13	2	Kurt Busch	Dodge	126.062	21.418	-0.224
14	12	Ryan Newman	Dodge	126.027	21.424	-0.230
15	31	Jeff Burton	Chevrolet	126.003	21.428	-0.234
16	24	Jeff Gordon	Chevrolet	125.992	21.430	-0.236
17	01	Joe Nemechek	Chevrolet	125.951	21.437	-0.243
18	20	Tony Stewart	Chevrolet	125.892	21.447	-0.253
19	22	Dave Blaney	Dodge	125.892	21.447	-0.253
20	7	Clint Bowyer	Chevrolet	125.862	21.452	-0.258
21	5	Kyle Busch	Chevrolet	125.804	21.462	-0.268
22	1	Martin Truex Jr	Chevrolet	125.500	21.514	-0.320
23	10	Scott Riggs	Dodge	125.401	21.531	-0.337
24	41	Reed Sorenson	Dodge	125.383	21.534	-0.340
25	66	Jeff Green	Chevrolet	125.342	21.541	-0.347
26	88	Dale Jarrett	Ford	125.220	21.562	-0.368
27	96	Tony Raines	Chevrolet	125.104	21.582	-0.388
28	21	Ken Schrader	Ford	125.052	21.591	-0.397
29	40	David Stremme	Dodge	124.965	21.606	-0.412
30	55	Michael Waltrip	Dodge	124.827	21.630	-0.436
31	26	Jamie McMurray	Ford	124.809	21.633	-0.439
32	14	Sterling Marlin	Chevrolet	124.740	21.645	-0.451
33	4	Scott Wimmer	Chevrolet	124.717	21.649	-0.455
34	18	JJ Yeley	Chevrolet	124.711	21.650	-0.456
35	43	Bobby Labonte	Dodge	124.579	21.673	-0.479
36	32	Travis Kvapil	Chevrolet	124.567	21.675	-0.481
37	38	Elliott Sadler	Ford	124.407	21.703	-0.509
38	19	Jeremy Mayfield	Dodge	124.304	21.721	-0.527
39	7	Robby Gordon	Chevrolet	124.292	21.723	-0.529
40	61	Kevin Lepage	Dodge	124.264	21.728	-0.534
41	74	Derrike Cope	Dodge	124.218	21.736	-0.542
42	78	Kenny Wallace	Chevrolet	124.081	21.760	-0.566
43	49	Mike Wallace	Dodge	123.491	21.864	-0.670
Failed to qualify
44	89	Kertus Davis	Dodge		21.873	
45	34	Chad Chaffin	Chevrolet		21.896	
46	95	Stanton Barrett	Chevrolet		21.970	
47	00	Hermie Sadler	Chevrolet		22.080	

== Race results ==
Rookie of the year contenders denoted by *

Fin	St	Car #	Driver	Make	Points	Bonus	Laps
1	10	8	Dale Earnhardt Jr.**	Chevrolet	185	5	400
2	7	11	Denny Hamlin *	Chevrolet	175	5	400
3	8	29	Kevin Harvick	Chevrolet	175	10	400
4	1	16	Greg Biffle	Ford	165	5	400
5	21	5	Kyle Busch	Chevrolet	160	5	400
6	18	20	Tony Stewart	Chevrolet	150		400
7	9	99	Carl Edwards	Ford	146		400
8	14	12	Ryan Newman	Dodge	142		400
9	32	14	Sterling Marlin	Chevrolet	138		400
10	20	7	Clint Bowyer *	Chevrolet	134		400
11	2	6	Mark Martin	Ford	135	5	400
12	5	48	Jimmie Johnson	Chevrolet	127		400
13	37	38	Elliott Sadler	Ford	124		400
14	23	10	Scott Riggs	Dodge	121		400
15	15	31	Jeff Burton	Chevrolet	118		399
16	28	21	Ken Schrader	Ford	115		399
17	3	42	Casey Mears	Dodge	112		399
18	25	66	Jeff Green	Chevrolet	109		399
19	31	26	Jamie McMurray	Ford	106		399
20	19	22	Dave Blaney	Dodge	103		399
21	26	88	Dale Jarrett	Ford	100		399
22	34	18	J. J. Yeley *	Chevrolet	97		399
23	24	41	Reed Sorenson *	Dodge	94		399
24	35	43	Bobby Labonte	Dodge	91		399
25	42	78	Kenny Wallace	Chevrolet	88		398
26	12	45	Kyle Petty	Dodge	85		398
27	36	32	Travis Kvapil	Chevrolet	82		398
28	17	1	Joe Nemechek	Chevrolet	79		398
29	13	2	Kurt Busch	Dodge	76		397
30	27	96	Tony Raines	Chevrolet	73		397
31	30	55	Michael Waltrip	Dodge	70		397
32	38	19	Jeremy Mayfield	Dodge	67		397
33	29	40	David Stremme *	Dodge	64		397
34	6	9	Kasey Kahne	Dodge	61		396
35	43	49	Mike Wallace	Dodge	58		395
36	33	4	Scott Wimmer	Chevrolet	55		389
37	4	25	Brian Vickers	Chevrolet	52		387
38	11	17	Matt Kenseth	Ford	49		351
39	39	7	Robby Gordon	Chevrolet	46		345
40	16	24	Jeff Gordon	Chevrolet	43		286
41	22	1	Martin Truex Jr. *	Chevrolet	40		285
42	40	61	Kevin Lepage	Ford	37		89
43	41	74	Derrike Cope	Dodge	34		11

Failed to qualify: Kertus Davis (#89), Chad Chaffin (#34), Stanton Barrett (#95), Hermie Sadler (#00)

Previous race: 2006 Aaron's 499	Nextel Cup Series; 2006 season	Next race: 2006 Dodge Charger 500
