= Scott Wimmer =

American racing driver (born 1976)

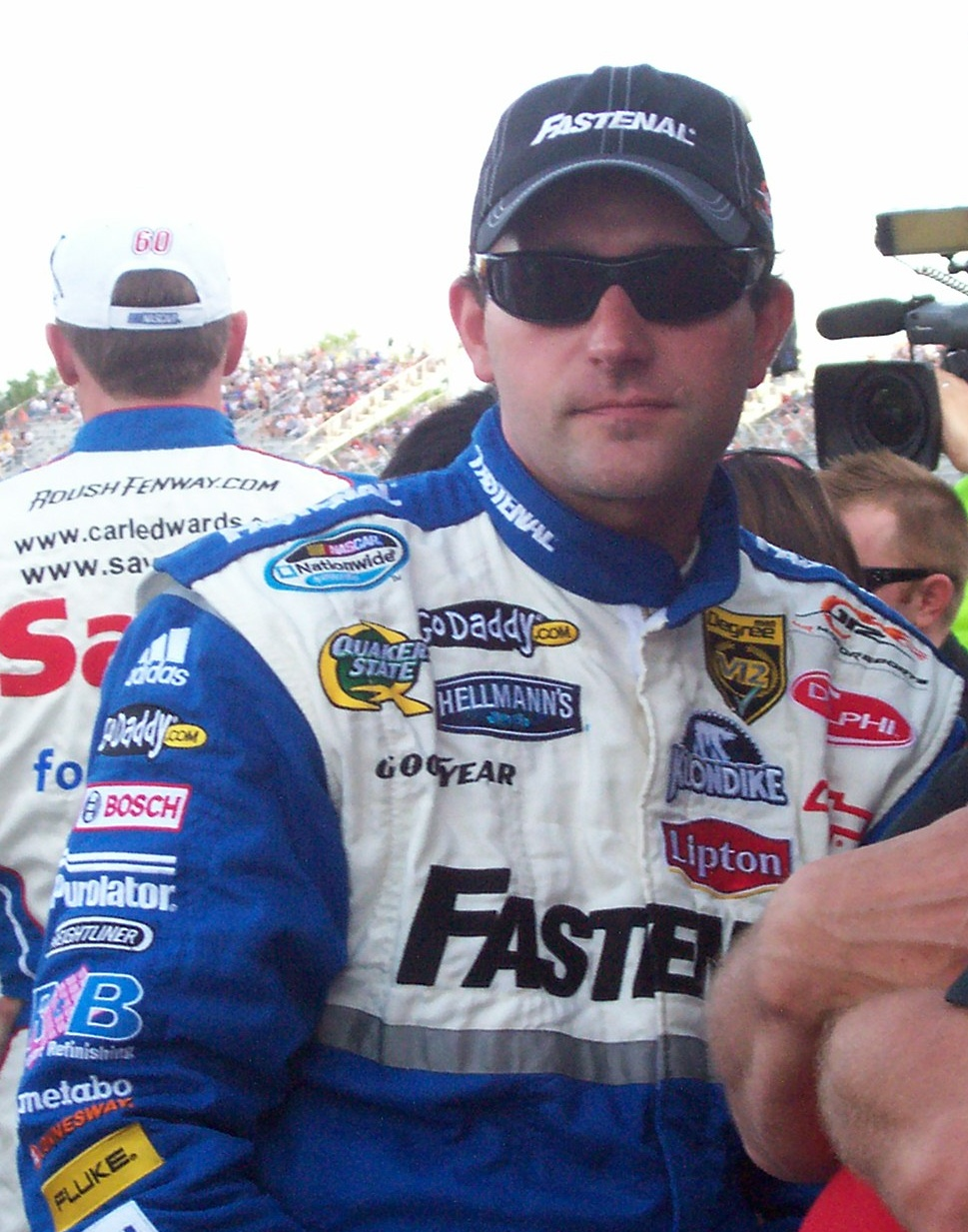
- Wimmer in 2009
- Born: Scott Allan Wimmer; January 26, 1976 (age 50); Wausau, Wisconsin, U.S.
- Awards: 1997 USAR Hooters Pro Cup Series Late Model Rookie of the Year

NASCAR Cup Series career
- 111 races run over 9 years
- 2011 position: 64th
- Best finish: 27th (2004)
- First race: 2000 NAPA 500 (Atlanta)
- Last race: 2011 Lenox Industrial Tools 301 (Loudon)
Wins	Top tens	Poles
0	3	0

NASCAR O'Reilly Auto Parts Series career
- 226 races run over 10 years
- 2011 position: 25th
- Best finish: 3rd (2002)
- First race: 2000 Sam's Town 250 (Memphis)
- Last race: 2011 OneMain Financial 200 (Dover)
- First win: 2002 MBNA All-American Heroes 200 (Dover)
- Last win: 2008 Pepsi 300 (Nashville)
Wins	Top tens	Poles
6	74	1

NASCAR FedEx Freight Truck Series career
- 3 races run over 2 years
- 2009 position: 62nd
- Best finish: 62nd (2009)
- First race: 2007 Ford 200 (Homestead)
- Last race: 2009 WinStar World Casino 350K (Texas)
Wins	Top tens	Poles
0	0	0
- Statistics up to date as of February 17, 2013.

Scott Allan Wimmer (born January 26, 1976) is an American former professional stock car racing driver. He has a total of six wins in the Xfinity Series. His brother Chris Wimmer competed in the Busch Series. Wimmer co-owned State Park Speedway in Wausau, Wisconsin.

== Youth ==
Wimmer competed in the United States National Junior Olympics in downhill and slalom skiing at the age of fourteen, and finished 13th of the 150 competitors. His father began as the owner of his uncle Larry Detjens' racing team. Detjens was a champion late model racer who competed at Slinger Speedway and Wisconsin International Raceway. Detjens had a race named after him after his death in 1981.

== Pre-NASCAR racing career ==
Wimmer started racing at State Park Speedway in Wausau, Wisconsin in 1991 at the age of fifteen. He moved up through the ranks, and became a well-known driver in the Midwest. He moved down south, and in 1997 was the Rookie of the Year in the Hooters Cup late model series. He later finished second for the Rookie of the Year in the American Speed Association (ASA) series in 2000. He began the season with no sponsor for his family-owned team, but was able to run the full season after winning the first two races of the year. He also made his Winston Cup debut.

== NASCAR career ==
=== 2000–2005 ===
Wimmer made his NASCAR debut in 2000, when he was signed to drive the No. 20 AT&T Pontiac Grand Prix for Bill Davis Racing in the Busch Series. After failing to qualify for his first race at Rockingham Speedway, he finished 18th in his debut at Memphis, followed by a 19th-place finish at Phoenix. He also made his Winston Cup debut at Atlanta, driving a car he had originally intended to drive at an ARCA RE/MAX Series race that weekend. The qualifying session was rained out for that race, and he was able to take his No. 23 car and enter in the Cup race. He finished 22nd and led nine laps in that race.

Wimmer was named Davis' permanent driver of the No. 23 Jani-King Pontiac in the 2001. He had two top-five finishes, eight top-ten finishes and finished 11th in points, second to Greg Biffle for the Rookie of the Year title. The team only had a sponsorship from Siemens for half of the races in 2002, and many rumors circulated that the team would shut down. The team remained open, and Wimmer won four races in the fall of that season at Dover, Memphis, Phoenix, and Homestead, and finished third in points. Davis was able to get Siemens sponsorship for Wimmer to run seven races in a No. 27 car in the Cup Series, but Wimmer was only able to make two of them. He also substituted in the No. 23 Hills Bros. Coffee car at Talladega earning a season's best finish of seventeenth.

Wimmer got full-time sponsorship from Stacker 2, YJ Stinger, and Stamina Rx in 2003, but after losing crew chief Bootie Barker and switching to Chevrolet, he won only one race at Pikes Peak, with four top-five finishes, twelve top-tens, and a ninth-place finish in points. Wimmer ran two races in the No. 27 YJ Stinger Chevrolet finishing 24th in both races at Bristol and New Hampshire. With four races left in the 2003 NASCAR Winston Cup Series, Wimmer was promoted to drive Bill Davis Racing's No. 22 Caterpillar Inc. Dodge. In his second race in the No. 22, he earned his first Cup Series top-ten finish (a ninth) at Phoenix.

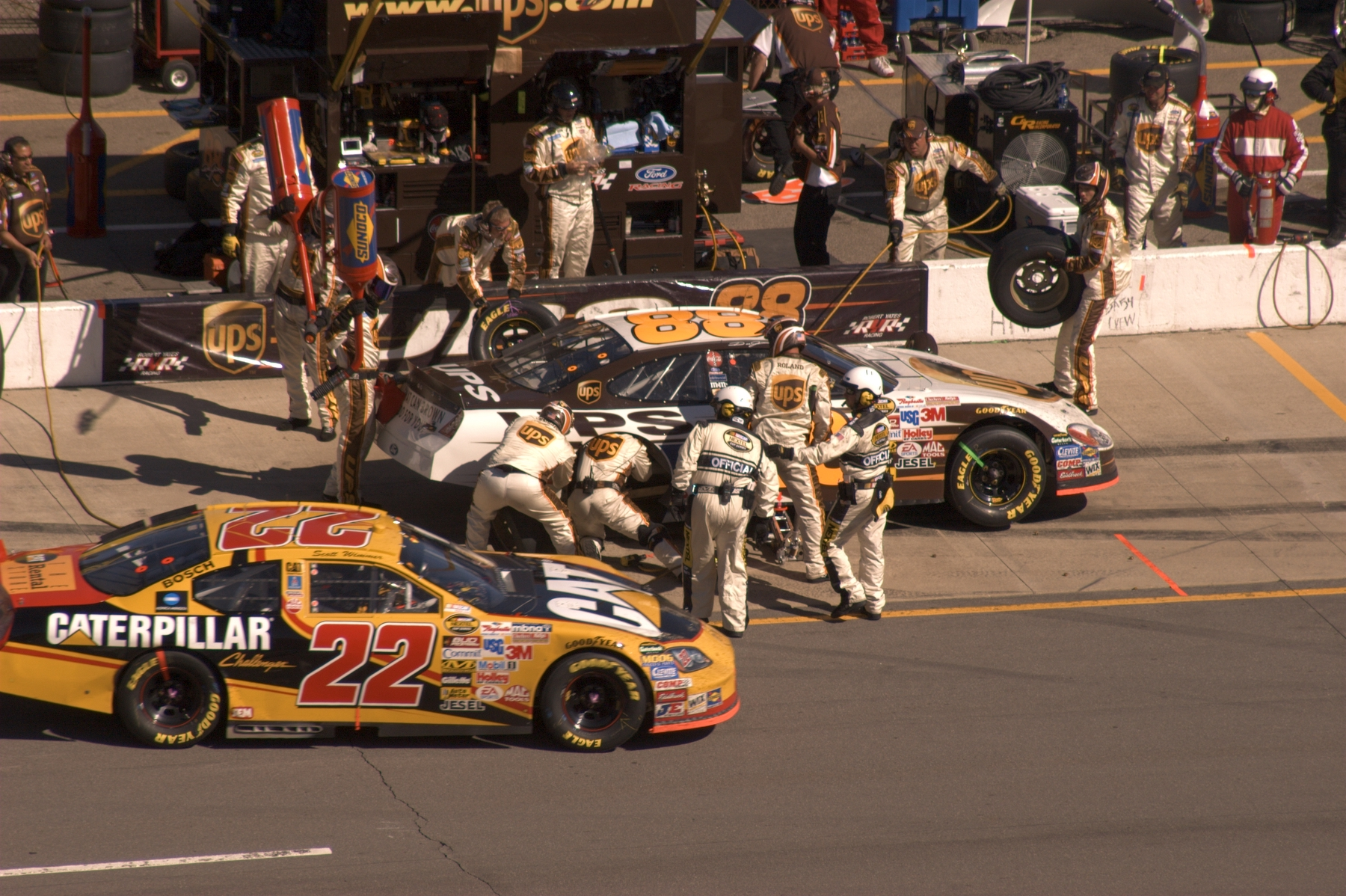
Wimmer (22 car) in the pits at Michigan in 2005.

At the end of the season, Wimmer was named the full-time driver for 2004 in the No. 22 Caterpillar Dodge. Before the 2004 season, he was arrested in High Point, North Carolina for driving while intoxicated. He was later convicted and sentenced to probation and 24-hour community service. He began the year with a very strong performance at the Daytona 500, and appeared in contention to win after the final set of pit stops, but without drafting help, Wimmer was easily overtaken by Dale Earnhardt Jr. and Tony Stewart, and ended up finishing third. After this, despite leading laps at a number of other races, Wimmer only had one other top-ten at Dover and finished 27th in points, due in part for failing to qualify for one race. The Davis team struggled in 2004; the Cup operation was reduced to only one car and the season was plagued with a lawsuit from Dodge. He ran the full season again in 2005, but did not finish higher than 11th in a race that season. He was dismissed from Bill Davis Racing by mail at the end of the season after only managing to squander up a 32nd in the point standings. The nature of his firing later led to a lawsuit against Bill Davis Racing.

=== 2006–2011 ===
Wimmer joined Morgan–McClure Motorsports in 2006 to drive their No. 4 Aero Exhaust Chevrolet. Due to nonpayment, the team lost sponsorship from Aero during the summer of the 2006 season, and Wimmer subsequently left the team following the race at Kansas. Wimmer then joined with Richard Childress Racing as a test driver for the remainder of the season and was signed to drive for the 2007 Busch Series season. Wimmer drove the final Cup race of the 2006 season at Homestead in the No. 33 Holiday Inn Chevrolet earning a season-best finish of 12th. In all, Wimmer missed twelve Cup races in 2006, and finished 38th in points. That year he also drove in sixteen races, part-time, in the Busch Series for the No. 66 Duraflame / Yard-Man / United States Postal Service Ford Taurus with Brewco Motorsports He also drove three races for FitzBradshaw Racing, two in the No. 14 Family Dollar Dodge and one in the No. 12 Goulds Pumps Dodge. Wimmer had four top-ten finishes, culminating the Busch season 29th in points.

In 2007, Wimmer joined Richard Childress Racing. He competed in 22 races between the No. 21 AutoZone Chevy (six races) and No. 29 Holiday Inn Chevy (sixteen races). He also drove one race for KHI at Fontana in Harvick's No. 77 Dollar General Chevrolet (twelfth). He won his first career pole at Gateway and had seven top-five finishes and fourteen top-ten finishes. Wimmer finished 14th in points despite his limited schedule. Wimmer shared the No. 29 car with Jeff Burton and with Burton's five wins, twelve top-five finishes, and seventeen top-ten finishes combined with Wimmer's finishes, the No. 29 team won the 2007 Busch Series Owners' Championship. At the time, it was only the second instance in Busch Series history that the Drivers' and Owners' Championships were not won by the same team. In the Nextel Cup Series, Wimmer attempted one race in the No. 78 Furniture Row Racing car at Michigan and five races for Childress in his No. 33 Chevrolet with sponsorships from Holiday Inn (four races) and Camping World (one race). He only qualified for one race (Indianapolis), finishing 31st after a pit road accident damaged his car.

In 2008, Wimmer increased his second-tier schedule by running 22 races in the No. 29 Holiday Inn Chevrolet and one in the No. 21 Prilosec Chevrolet for Childress in newly renamed 2008 NASCAR Nationwide Series. Wimmer picked up a win at Nashville, his first win since 2003. It was also his sixth and final career victory in the Series. Wimmer also had five top-five finishes and thirteen top-ten finishes helping the No. 29 finish fifth in Owner's Points while Wimmer ended up 17th in points, running only a part-time schedule. Wimmer also attempted one race in the 2008 Sprint Cup Series, failing to make the race at Richmond in the No. 33 Camping World Chevrolet for Richard Childress Racing.

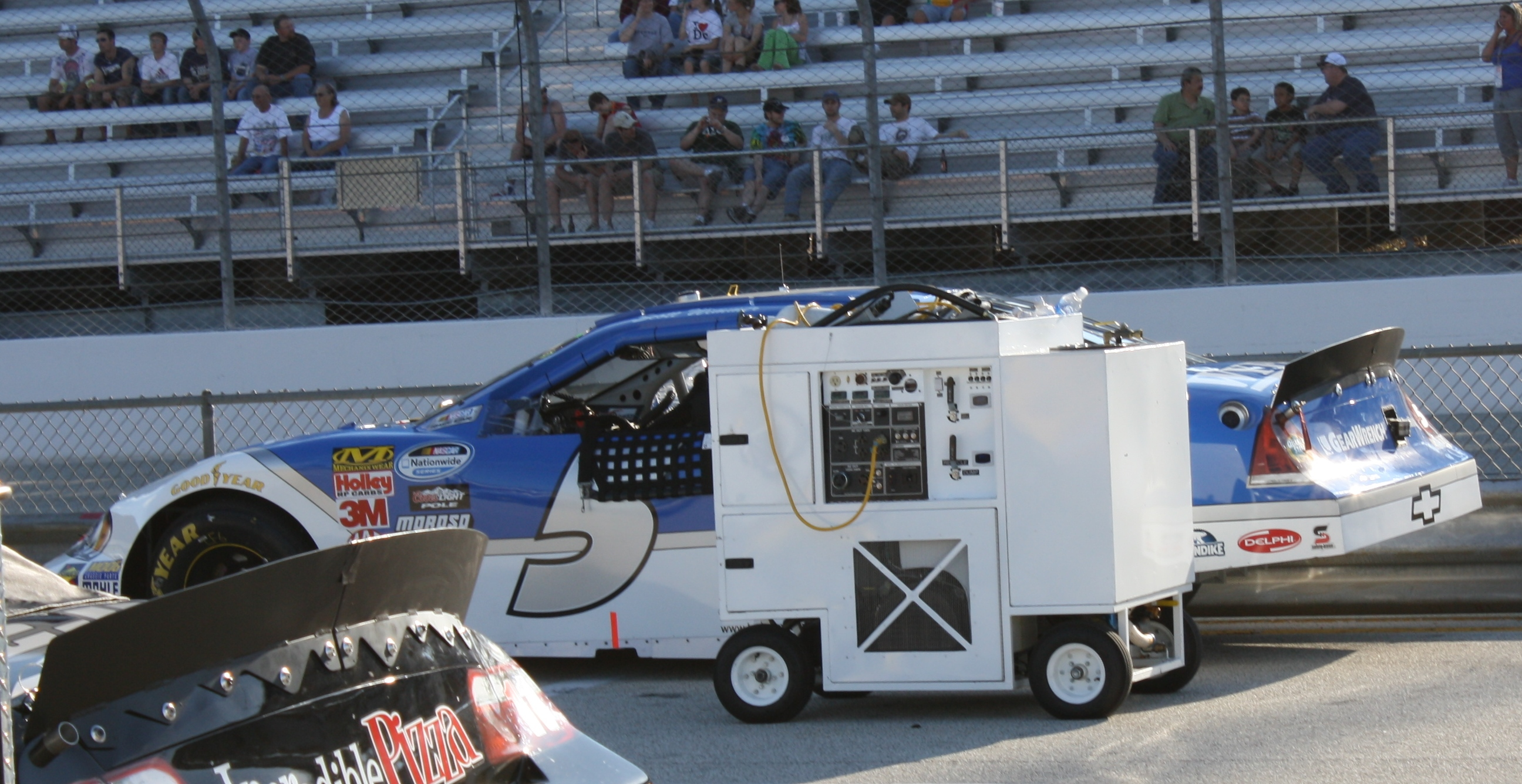
Wimmer's No. 5 JR Motorsports car in 2009

Due to the lack of a sponsorship, he was released from Childress and he spent the 2009 season splitting time between the No. 5 Fastenal Chevy for JR Motorsports in six races and the No. 40 StopRepairBills.com/Westerman Companies Chevy for Key Motorsports in the majority of races in the Nationwide Series. He would end up with three top-tens and finished 16th in Driver Points. Wimmer also returned to Morgan–McClure Motorsports in the Sprint Cup Series driving one race at Bristol in the No. 4 Alpha Natural Resources Chevrolet finishing 29th. Wimmer failed to make the race for MMM at Dover. Outside of his NASCAR endeavors, Wimmer and his father bought and made major improvements to State Park Speedway in Wausau, WI, in the fall of 2009.

In 2010, Wimmer decided to only drive high quality equipment in the Nationwide Series. Because of this, Wimmer started the season without a ride. He got a two race ride with JR Motorsports in the No. 7 Chevrolet at Bristol and Nashville. He was able to get finishes of tenth and seventh respectively. Wimmer then earned a three race ride with Baker Curb Racing in the No. 27 Red Man Ford. His best finish with them was a seventh at Kentucky. Any hopes to continue with them ended when their Red Man sponsorship expired. Wimmer spent most of the rest of the season without a ride but was able to get a one race deal with Turner Scott Motorsports. He drove the No. 10 AccuDoc Solutions Toyota at Gateway but crashed out. In 2010, Wimmer had three top-ten finishes in six races and led laps in five of the races he ran.

Wimmer started the 2011 Nationwide Series season driving the No. 40 for Key Motorsports earning a best finish of 12th at Talladega before leaving after the eleventh race due to the lack of a sponsorship. After leaving, Wimmer drove three races for the No. 70 of ML Motorsports with twice a best finish of 15th, both at races at Iowa Speedway. He also drove one race each for No. 87 NEMCO Motorsports at Nashville (finished 13th), No. 40 Key Motorsports at Bristol (finished 24th), and No. 81 MacDonald Motorsports at Chicagoland (finished 30th). In addition to these full race rides, Wimmer start and parked a few races for R3 Motorsports (one race), Key Motorsports (two races), and McDonald Motorsports (one race). Despite only running 21 of 34 races, Wimmer used six top-20 finishes to help him to finish 25th in points.

Wimmer was also able to run a few Sprint Cup Series races in 2011 for Robby Gordon Motorsports. Wimmer substituted for Gordon in the No. 7 Speed Energy Dodge at Dover, Pocono, Kentucky, and New Hampshire; earning a best finish of 27th at New Hampshire. In addition, Wimmer attempted to qualify a second Speed Energy car (No. 77) at Charlotte and Indianapolis but he failed to qualify for either race.

== After NASCAR ==
In 2012, Wimmer partnered with Russ Blakeley, Jim Budzinski and Kurt Wise to form Wild Motorsports. The team ran the ASA Midwest Tour race at the Milwaukee Mile in June and announced plans to run the Nationwide Series starting with the September race at Richmond with the goal of running the full 2013 schedule. The team was never able to obtain sponsorship and never attempted a race. During 2012, Wimmer took the position of driver coach/spotter for up and coming driver Cody Coughlin, who ran a variety of short track series. Wimmer continued in 2013 to be a spotter/coach for Coughlin and helped him to two wins and the championship in the JEGS/CRA All-Stars Tour.

In early 2014, Coughlin was signed by Joe Gibbs Racing to a driver development contract. Coughlin ran a limited schedule in his Team JEGS Late Model in the ARCA/CRA Super Series and with Venturini Motorsports in the ARCA Racing Series in the No. 55 JEGS High Performance-sponsored Toyota. Coughlin ran eleven races with three top-fives, eight top-tens and a best finish of fourth. Wimmer continued his role as spotter/coach to Coughlin in both series along with running State Park Speedway.

On July 26, Wimmer returned to driving when he drove Coughlin's No. 1 JEGS Late Model in the 34th annual Larry Detjens Memorial 125 at his State Park Speedway. He started sixteenth and finished thirteenth.

Wimmer continued to help guide Coughlin in 2015. Coughlin drove the No. 55 JEGS Toyota in the ARCA Racing Series for Venturini Motorsports in six races winning poles at Talladega and Chicagoland with a best finish of second at Talladega. Coughlin made his Camping World Truck Series debut for Venturini in the No. 25 JEGS Toyota at Kentucky finishing twentieth. Coughlin would join Kyle Busch Motorsports in August, driving their No. 54 at Michigan to a twentieth place finish.

Wimmer remained Coughlin's spotter/coach in 2016 when he drove nine races for Kyle Busch Motorsports in their No. 51 (eight races) and No. 18 (one race) trucks and one race for Athenian Motorsports (No. 05) in the Camping World Truck Series. He had a best finish of twelfth at Texas. Coughlin also was able to win championships in the ARCA/CRA Super Series and JEGS/CRA All-Star Tour.

Wimmer and Coughlin's association would end in January 2017 when Coughlin joined ThorSport Racing. ThorSport's former driver Terry Cook assumed the role of spotter/coach for Coughlin when he joined the team.

== Motorsports career results ==
=== NASCAR ===
(key) (Bold – Pole position awarded by qualifying time. Italics – Pole position earned by points standings or practice time. * – Most laps led.)

==== Sprint Cup Series ====
NASCAR Sprint Cup Series results
Year	Team	No.	Make	1	2	3	4	5	6	7	8	9	10	11	12	13	14	15	16	17	18	19	20	21	22	23	24	25	26	27	28	29	30	31	32	33	34	35	36	NSCC	Pts	Ref
2000	Bill Davis Racing	23	Pontiac	DAY	CAR	LVS	ATL	DAR	BRI	TEX	MAR	TAL	CAL	RCH	CLT	DOV	MCH	POC	SON	DAY	NHA	POC	IND	GLN	MCH	BRI	DAR	RCH	NHA	DOV	MAR	CLT	TAL	CAR	PHO	HOM	ATL; 22			74th	0	
2002	Bill Davis Racing	27	Dodge	DAY	CAR	LVS	ATL	DAR	BRI	TEX	MAR	TAL	CAL	RCH	CLT	DOV	POC	MCH	SON	DAY	CHI; DNQ	NHA	POC	IND; DNQ	GLN	MCH	BRI; 40	DAR	RCH	NHA	DOV; DNQ	KAN		CLT; DNQ	MAR	ATL; DNQ	CAR	PHO; 42	HOM	56th	192	
2002	Bill Davis Racing	23	Dodge																														TAL; 17							56th	192	
2003	Bill Davis Racing	27	Chevy	DAY	CAR	LVS	ATL	DAR	BRI	TEX	TAL	MAR	CAL	RCH	CLT	DOV	POC	MCH	SON	DAY	CHI	NHA	POC	IND	GLN	MCH	BRI; 24	DAR	RCH	NHA; 24	DOV; DNQ	TAL	KAN	CLT	MAR					48th	599	
2003	Bill Davis Racing	22	Dodge																																	ATL; 32	PHO; 9	CAR; 26	HOM; 12	48th	599	
2004	Bill Davis Racing	22	Dodge	DAY; 3	CAR; 15	LVS; 39	ATL; 27	DAR; 16	BRI; 13	TEX; 33	MAR; 29	TAL; 18	CAL; 30	RCH; 30	CLT; 28	DOV; 9	POC; 35	MCH; 14	SON; 25	DAY; 32	CHI; 23	NHA; 18	POC; 11	IND; 32	GLN; 19	MCH; 18	BRI; 36	CAL; 21	RCH; 38	NHA; 36	DOV; 23	TAL; 31	KAN; 36	CLT; 26	MAR; 20	ATL; DNQ	PHO; 26	DAR; 22	HOM; 13	27th	3198	
2005	Bill Davis Racing	22	Dodge	DAY; 33	CAL; 16	LVS; 27	ATL; 20	BRI; 27	MAR; 31	TEX; 42	PHO; 32	TAL; 38	DAR; 25	RCH; 20	CLT; 23	DOV; 31	POC; 36	MCH; 16	SON; 25	DAY; 32	CHI; 17	NHA; 35	POC; 25	IND; 26	GLN; 21	MCH; 23	BRI; 14	CAL; 31	RCH; 24	NHA; 26	DOV; 36	TAL; 17	KAN; 27	CLT; 20	MAR; 25	ATL; 27	TEX; 27	PHO; 21	HOM; 11	32nd	3122	
2006	Morgan-McClure Motorsports	4	Chevy	DAY; DNQ	CAL; 39	LVS; 32	ATL; 30	BRI; 19	MAR; 28	TEX; 28	PHO; 30	TAL; 21	RCH; 36	DAR; 33	CLT; 27	DOV; 34	POC; DNQ	MCH; 31	SON	DAY; DNQ	CHI; 34	NHA; 20	POC; 38	IND; 20	GLN; 25	MCH; DNQ	BRI; 42	CAL; 30	RCH; 29	NHA; 31	DOV; 36	KAN; DNQ	TAL	CLT	MAR	ATL	TEX	PHO		38th	1812	
2006	Richard Childress Racing	33	Chevy																																				HOM; 12	38th	1812	
2007	Richard Childress Racing	33	Chevy	DAY	CAL	LVS	ATL; DNQ	BRI	MAR	TEX; DNQ	PHO	TAL	RCH	DAR	CLT	DOV	POC	MCH	SON	NHA	DAY	CHI	IND; 31	POC	GLN						DOV; DNQ	KAN	TAL	CLT	MAR	ATL	TEX	PHO	HOM	68th	70	
2007	Furniture Row Racing	78	Chevy																							MCH; DNQ	BRI	CAL	RCH	NHA										68th	70	
2008	Richard Childress Racing	33	Chevy	DAY	CAL	LVS	ATL	BRI	MAR	TEX	PHO	TAL	RCH; DNQ	DAR	CLT	DOV	POC	MCH	SON	NHA	DAY	CHI	IND	POC	GLN	MCH	BRI	CAL	RCH	NHA	DOV	KAN	TAL	CLT	MAR	ATL	TEX	PHO	HOM	N/A	-	
2009	Morgan-McClure Motorsports	4	Chevy	DAY	CAL	LVS	ATL	BRI	MAR	TEX	PHO	TAL	RCH	DAR	CLT	DOV	POC	MCH	SON	NHA	DAY	CHI	IND	POC	GLN	MCH	BRI; 29	ATL	RCH	NHA	DOV; DNQ	KAN	CAL	CLT	MAR	TAL	TEX	PHO	HOM	62nd	76	
2011	Robby Gordon Motorsports	7	Dodge	DAY	PHO	LVS	BRI	CAL	MAR	TEX	TAL	RCH	DAR	DOV; 37			POC; 38	MCH	SON	DAY	KEN; 37	NHA; 27																		64th	0^{1}	
2011	Robby Gordon Motorsports	77	Dodge												CLT; DNQ	KAN							IND; DNQ	POC	GLN	MCH	BRI	ATL	RCH	CHI	NHA	DOV	KAN	CLT	TAL	MAR	TEX	PHO	HOM	64th	0^{1}	

===== Daytona 500 =====
Year	Team	Manufacturer	Start	Finish
2004	Bill Davis Racing	Dodge	26	3
2005	Bill Davis Racing	Dodge	16	33
2006	Morgan-McClure Motorsports	Chevrolet	DNQ	

==== Nationwide Series ====
NASCAR Nationwide Series results
Year	Team	No.	Make	1	2	3	4	5	6	7	8	9	10	11	12	13	14	15	16	17	18	19	20	21	22	23	24	25	26	27	28	29	30	31	32	33	34	35	NNSC	Pts	Ref
2000	Bill Davis Racing	20	Pontiac	DAY	CAR	LVS	ATL	DAR	BRI	TEX	NSV	TAL	CAL	RCH	NHA	CLT	DOV	SBO	MYB	GLN	MLW	NZH	PPR	GTY	IRP	MCH	BRI	DAR	RCH	DOV	CLT	CAR; DNQ	MEM; 18	PHO; 19	HOM; 43				78th	254	
2001	Bill Davis Racing	23	Pontiac	DAY; 15	CAR; 31	LVS; 11	ATL; 14	DAR; 12	BRI; 29	TEX; 15	NSH; 3	TAL; 42	CAL; 19	RCH; 7	NHA; 17	NZH; 30	CLT; 35	DOV; 7	KEN; 17	MLW; 30	GLN; 23	CHI; 13	GTY; 10	PPR; 20		MCH; 23	BRI; 6	DAR; 12	RCH; 15	DOV; 12	KAN; 17	CLT; 11	MEM; 8	PHO; 7	CAR; 13	HOM; 4			11th	3773	
2001	Bill Davis Racing	23	Chevy																						IRP; 31														11th	3773	
2002	Bill Davis Racing	23	Pontiac	DAY; 13	CAR; 19	LVS; 13	DAR; 34	BRI; 3	TEX; 21	NSH; 4	TAL; 28	CAL; 12	RCH; 8	NHA; 11	NZH; 16	CLT; 18	DOV; 4	NSH; 7	KEN; 5	MLW; 3		CHI; 13	GTY; 21	PPR; 6	IRP; 3	MCH; 7	BRI; 2	DAR; 7	RCH; 9	DOV; 1	KAN; 24	CLT; 43	MEM; 1*	ATL; 13	CAR; 17	PHO; 1	HOM; 1		3rd	4488	
2002	Bill Davis Racing	23	Dodge																		DAY; 26																		3rd	4488	
2003	Bill Davis Racing	23	Chevy	DAY; 12	CAR; 11	LVS; 10	DAR; 28	BRI; 25	TEX; 8	TAL; 38	NSH; 36	CAL; 14	RCH; 5	GTY; 8	NZH; 13	CLT; 19	DOV; 15	NSH; 8	KEN; 5	MLW; 14	DAY; 16	CHI; 15	NHA; 5	PPR; 1	IRP; 12	MCH; 26	BRI; 32	DAR; 18	RCH; 16	DOV; 14	KAN; 7	CLT; 20	MEM; 6	ATL; 14	PHO; 7	CAR; 8	HOM; 39		9th	4059	
2006	Brewco Motorsports	66	Ford	DAY	CAL; 14	MXC	LVS	ATL	BRI	TEX; 9	NSH	PHO	TAL	RCH; 16	DAR; 26	CLT; 25	DOV; 15	NSH	KEN	MLW; 29	DAY; 33	CHI	NHA; 9	MAR	GTY; 6	IRP	GLN			CAL; 25	RCH; 8			CLT; 21	MEM	TEX; 11	PHO; 42	HOM; 15	29th	2002	
2006	FitzBradshaw Racing	14	Dodge																									MCH; 42	BRI; 17										29th	2002	
2006	FitzBradshaw Racing	12	Dodge																													DOV; 11	KAN						29th	2002	
2007	Richard Childress Racing	29	Chevy	DAY; 13	CAL	MXC; 30	LVS	ATL	BRI; 9	NSH; 7	TEX	PHO	TAL; 34					NSH; 4	KEN; 3	MLW; 2	NHA; 11	DAY; 31	CHI	**GTY**; 2	IRP; 7	CGV; QL^{†}	GLN	MCH			RCH; 8	DOV; 29			MEM; 6	TEX	PHO; 4	HOM	14th	3072	
2007	Richard Childress Racing	21	Chevy											RCH; 10	DAR	CLT; 9	DOV; 3												BRI; 5				KAN; 15	CLT; 13					14th	3072	
2007	Kevin Harvick, Inc.	77	Chevy																											CAL; 12									14th	3072	
2008	Richard Childress Racing	29	Chevy	DAY; 18	CAL	LVS	ATL	**BRI**; 12	NSH; 1	TEX	PHO	MXC; 7	TAL; 9	RCH; 10	DAR	CLT	DOV; 12	NSH; 7	KEN; 2	MLW; 6	NHA; 12	DAY; 7	CHI	GTY; 30	IRP; 4	CGV; 11	GLN	MCH; 22	BRI; 6	CAL	RCH; 2	DOV; 4	KAN	CLT	MEM; 22	TEX; 13	PHO; 19		17th	3002	
2008	Richard Childress Racing	21	Chevy																																			HOM; 6	17th	3002	
2009	Key Motorsports	40	Chevy	DAY; 32	CAL; DNQ	LVS; 11	BRI; 22	TEX; DNQ	NSH; 28	PHO; 19	TAL; DNQ	RCH; 16		CLT; 28	DOV; 18	NSH; 33	KEN; 16		NHA; 17	DAY; 21	CHI; 15	GTY; 15				MCH; 35	BRI; 21	CGV	ATL; 18		DOV; 14		CAL; 21	CLT; 25	MEM; 7	TEX; 14	PHO; 15	HOM; 19	16th	3177	
2009	JR Motorsports	5	Chevy										DAR; 9					MLW; 18					IRP; 9	IOW; 31	GLN					RCH; 18		KAN; 12							16th	3177	
2010	JR Motorsports	7	Chevy	DAY	CAL	LVS	BRI; 10	NSH; 7	PHO	TEX																													53rd	745	
2010	Baker Curb Racing	27	Ford								TAL; 12	RCH	DAR	DOV	CLT	NSH; 21	KEN; 7	ROA	NHA	DAY	CHI	GTY	IRP	IOW	GLN	MCH	BRI	CGV	ATL	RCH	DOV	KAN	CAL	CLT					53rd	745	
2010	Turner Motorsports	10	Toyota																																GTY; 32	TEX	PHO	HOM	53rd	745	
2011	Key Motorsports	40	Chevy	DAY; 35	PHO; 16	LVS; 33	BRI; 22	CAL; 34	TEX; 33	TAL; 12	NSH; 21	RCH; 24	DAR; 38	DOV; 35														BRI; 24	ATL	RCH									25th	340	
2011	ML Motorsports	70	Chevy												IOW; 15	CLT	CHI; 19	MCH							IOW; 15	GLN	CGV												25th	340	
2011	R3 Motorsports	03	Dodge																ROA; 39	DAY	KEN																		25th	340	
2011	Key Motorsports	47	Chevy																			NHA; 42																	25th	340	
2011	NEMCO Motorsports	87	Toyota																				NSH; 13																25th	340	
2011	Key Motorsports	42	Chevy																					IRP; 39															25th	340	
2011	MacDonald Motorsports	81	Dodge																												CHI; 30								25th	340	
2011	MacDonald Motorsports	82	Dodge																													DOV; 41	KAN	CLT	TEX	PHO	HOM		25th	340	
^{†} - Qualified for Jeff Burton

==== Camping World Truck Series ====
NASCAR Camping World Truck Series results
Year	Team	No.	Make	1	2	3	4	5	6	7	8	9	10	11	12	13	14	15	16	17	18	19	20	21	22	23	24	25	NCWTC	Pts	Ref
2007	Morgan-Dollar Motorsports	46	Chevy	DAY	CAL	ATL	MAR	KAN	CLT	MFD	DOV	TEX	MCH	MLW	MEM	KEN	IRP	NSH	BRI	GTW	NHA	LVS	TAL	MAR	ATL	TEX	PHO	HOM; 23	116th	0	
2009	Win-Tron Racing	31	Chevy	DAY	CAL	ATL	MAR	KAN	CLT	DOV; 21	TEX	MCH	MLW	MEM	KEN	IRP	NSH	BRI	CHI	IOW	GTW	NHA	LVS	MAR	TAL				62nd	224	
2009	Turner Motorsports	31	Chevy																							TEX; 13	PHO	HOM	62nd	224	

^{1} Ineligible for series championship points.

=== ARCA Bondo/Mar-Hyde Series ===
(key) (Bold – Pole position awarded by qualifying time. Italics – Pole position earned by points standings or practice time. * – Most laps led.)

ARCA Bondo/Mar-Hyde Series results
Year	Team	No.	Make	1	2	3	4	5	6	7	8	9	10	11	12	13	14	15	16	17	18	19	20	ABMSC	Pts	Ref
2000	Bill Davis Racing	20	Pontiac	DAY	SLM	AND	CLT	KIL	FRS	MCH	POC	TOL	KEN	BLN	POC	WIN	ISF	KEN	DSF	SLM	CLT	TAL	ATL; DNQ	N/A	0	
