= Larry Foyt =

American racing driver

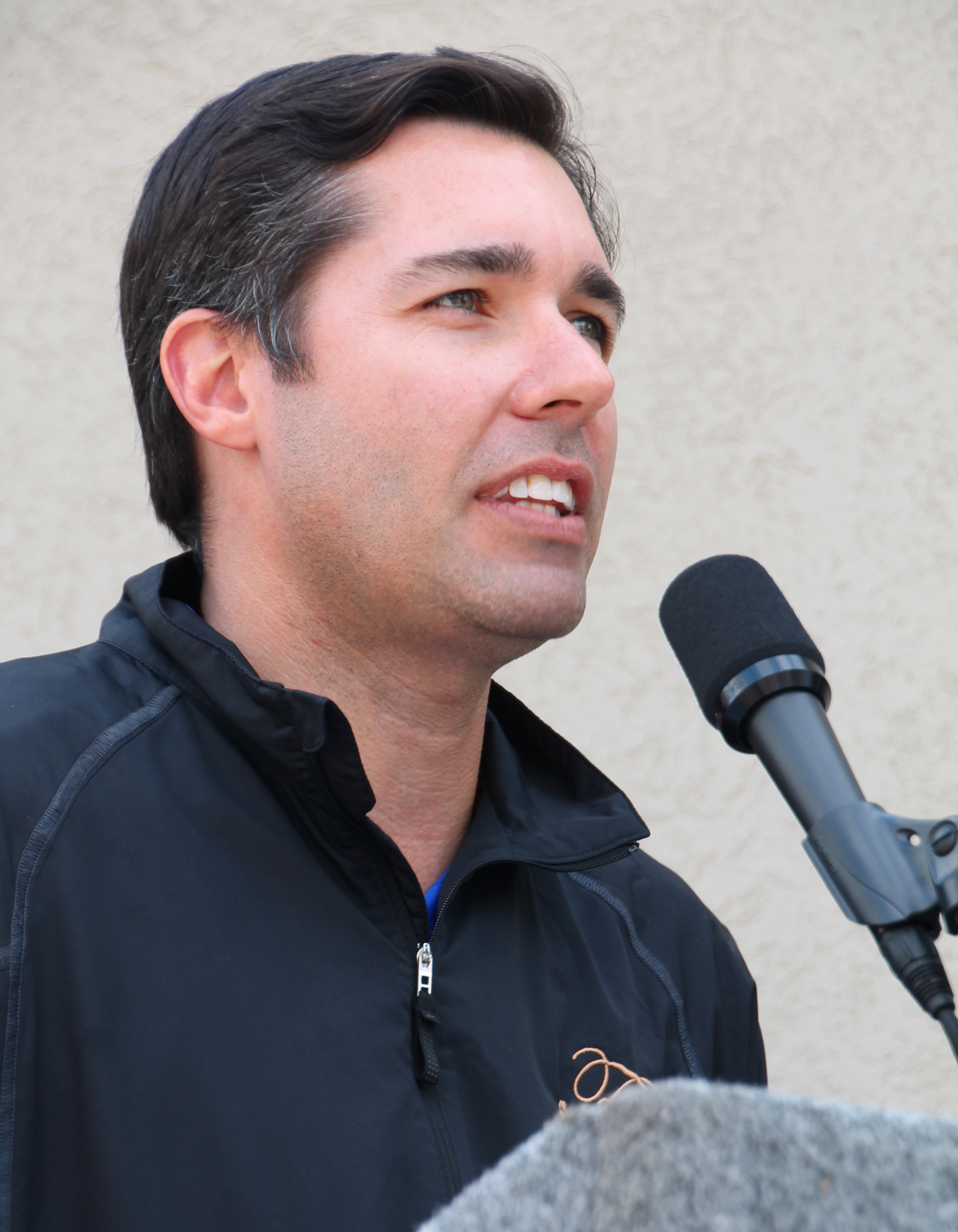
- Foyt in 2015
- Born: February 22, 1977 (age 49); Houston, Texas, U.S.

NASCAR Cup Series career
- 23 races run over 2 years
- Best finish: 41st (2003)
- First race: 2003 Subway 400 (Rockingham)
- Last race: 2004 Samsung/Radio Shack 500 (Texas)
Wins	Top tens	Poles
0	0	0

NASCAR O'Reilly Auto Parts Series career
- 67 races run over 3 years
- Best finish: 20th (2002)
- First race: 2001 NAPA Auto Parts 300 (Daytona)
- Last race: 2007 Winn-Dixie 250 (Daytona)
Wins	Top tens	Poles
0	2	0

NASCAR FedEx Freight Truck Series career
- 3 races run over 3 years
- Best finish: 80th (2008 )
- First race: 2007 Chevy Silverado HD 250 (Daytona)
- Last race: 2009 Nextera Energy Resources 250 (Daytona)
Wins	Top tens	Poles
0	0	0

Lawrence Joseph Roberds Foyt (born February 22, 1977) is an American former NASCAR and IndyCar driver and current team principal for A.J. Foyt Enterprises. He is the biological grandson and adopted son of A. J. Foyt, and a biological cousin (and uncle by adoption) of A. J. Foyt IV. His biological mother (and sister by adoption) is Terry Lynn Foyt, daughter of A. J. Foyt, who divorced his biological father Larry Gene Roberds when he was an infant. He also drove in the 2004, 2005, and the 2006 Indianapolis 500 for A. J. Foyt Enterprises.

== Racing career ==
=== Early career ===
Foyt began racing in 1993 in the go-kart ranks, and won his first race two years later. He would win the state championship in his first year in 125cc competition one year later. In 1997, he began running USAC's Formula 2000 series. He won two races in the SCCA series in 1999. The next year, he made his stock car racing debut in the American Speed Association, where he won a pole at Winchester Speedway and had four top-tens. In addition, he made his first attempt at a Winston Cup race at Atlanta Motor Speedway in his father's backup car, but missed the field. The same year, he graduated from Texas Christian University with a degree in communications.

=== NASCAR ===
In 2001, Foyt moved to the Busch Series, driving the No. 14 Harrah's Chevrolet Monte Carlo. He had five top-twenties and finished 22nd in points, third in the Rookie of the Year championship. The next year, he had two top-tens and finished twentieth in points. He moved to Cup full-time in 2003, and had a best finish of sixteenth at Homestead-Miami Speedway, finishing 41st in points. After the team lost its Harrah's sponsorship, Foyt ran just three races before the team closed its doors.

In 2005, Foyt ran one race in ARCA and finished twelfth in the race. He ended up missing most of the season after suffering back injuries in a crash in the Indy 500. He hoped to make the Daytona 500 in the No. 50 owned by Arnold Motorsports, but missed the race. Early in the season, he announced the formation of his own Busch Series team, but after sponsorship failed to materialize, the team dissolved. He also ran the Indianapolis 500 again, finishing 30th after suffering handling problems.

A. J. Foyt announced in July 2006 that Larry would be assuming more management responsibilities at A. J. Foyt Enterprises and eventually assume the role of team manager by the end of the 2007 season. He returned to NASCAR driving the No. 44 Key Motorsports Chevy with sponsorship from Silestone by Cosentino for one race, but wrecked early in the 2007 Chevy Silverado HD 250, finishing 32nd. He attempted the Pepsi 400 in NEXTEL Cup with BAM Racing, however qualifying was rained out, forcing him to miss the race. He competed that weekend in the Daytona Busch Series race for Mac Hill Racing, finishing 38th after a wreck. He made his second career Craftsman Truck race in 2008 at Daytona, starting 36th and finishing eighteenth.

Foyt attempted both the Nationwide and Camping World Truck races at Daytona in 2009, for Mac Hill Motorsports and Derrike Cope, Inc., respectively. He failed to qualify for the Nationwide Series race and finished twentieth, fifteen laps down, in the Truck Series race.

== Motorsports career results ==
=== NASCAR ===
(key) (Bold – Pole position awarded by qualifying time. Italics – Pole position earned by points standings or practice time. * – Most laps led.)

==== Nextel Cup Series ====
NASCAR Nextel Cup Series results
Year	Team	No.	Make	1	2	3	4	5	6	7	8	9	10	11	12	13	14	15	16	17	18	19	20	21	22	23	24	25	26	27	28	29	30	31	32	33	34	35	36	NNCC	Pts	Ref
2000	A. J. Foyt Racing	41	Pontiac	DAY	CAR	LVS	ATL	DAR	BRI	TEX	MAR	TAL	CAL	RCH	CLT	DOV	MCH	POC	SON	DAY	NHA	POC	IND	GLN	MCH	BRI	DAR	RCH	NHA	DOV	MAR	CLT	TAL	CAR	PHO	HOM	ATL; DNQ			NA	-	
2003	A. J. Foyt Racing	14	Dodge	DAY; DNQ	CAR; 36	LVS; 35	ATL; 43	DAR; 32	BRI; DNQ	TEX; 30	TAL; DNQ	MAR; Wth	CAL; 38	RCH; 33	CLT; 34	DOV; 28	POC; 41	MCH; DNQ	SON	DAY; 34	CHI; 41			IND; 32								TAL; 43	KAN; DNQ	CLT	MAR	ATL; DNQ	PHO; 28	CAR; 28	HOM; 16	41st	1228	
2003	A. J. Foyt Racing	50	Dodge																			NHA; DNQ	POC; 29		GLN; DNQ	MCH; 39	BRI; 39	DAR; DNQ	RCH; DNQ	NHA; DNQ	DOV; DNQ									41st	1228	
2004	A. J. Foyt Racing	14	Dodge	DAY; 28	CAR; 32	LVS	ATL	DAR	BRI	TEX; 30	MAR	TAL; DNQ	CAL	RCH	CLT	DOV	POC	MCH	SON	DAY	CHI	NHA	POC	IND	GLN	MCH	BRI	CAL	RCH	NHA	DOV	TAL	KAN							66th	194	
2004	BAM Racing	59	Dodge																															CLT; DNQ	MAR	ATL; DNQ	PHO	DAR		66th	194	
2004	BAM Racing	70	Dodge																																				HOM; DNQ	66th	194	
2006	Arnold Motorsports	50	Dodge	DAY; DNQ	CAL	LVS	ATL	BRI	MAR	TEX	PHO	TAL	RCH	DAR	CLT	DOV	POC	MCH	SON	DAY	CHI	NHA	POC	IND	GLN	MCH	BRI	CAL	RCH	NHA	DOV	KAN	TAL	CLT	MAR	ATL	TEX	PHO	HOM	NA	-	
2007	BAM Racing	49	Dodge	DAY	CAL	LVS	ATL	BRI	MAR	TEX	PHO	TAL	RCH	DAR	CLT	DOV	POC	MCH	SON	NHA	DAY; DNQ	CHI	IND	POC	GLN	MCH	BRI	CAL	RCH	NHA	DOV	KAN	TAL	CLT	MAR	ATL	TEX	PHO	HOM	NA	-	

===== Daytona 500 =====
Year	Team	Manufacturer	Start	Finish
2003	A. J. Foyt Racing	Dodge	DNQ	
2004	A. J. Foyt Racing	Dodge	41	28
2006	Arnold Motorsports	Dodge	DNQ	

==== Nationwide Series ====
NASCAR Nationwide Series results
Year	Team	No.	Make	1	2	3	4	5	6	7	8	9	10	11	12	13	14	15	16	17	18	19	20	21	22	23	24	25	26	27	28	29	30	31	32	33	34	35	NNSC	Pts	Ref
2001	A. J. Foyt Racing	14	Chevy	DAY; 19	CAR; 24	LVS; 31	ATL; 22	DAR; 30	BRI; 33	TEX; 22	NSH; 29	TAL; 12	CAL; 21	RCH; 27	NHA; 28	NZH; 26	CLT; 28	DOV; 41	KEN; 19	MLW; 23	GLN; 30	CHI; 22	GTY; 32	PPR; 34	IRP; 27	MCH; 18	BRI; 33	DAR; 39	RCH; INQ^{†}	DOV; 23	KAN; 30	CLT; 24	MEM; 17	PHO; 34	CAR; 29	HOM; 24			22nd	2673	
2002	A. J. Foyt Racing	14	Chevy	DAY; 15	CAR; 10	LVS; 27	DAR; 38	BRI; 20	TEX; 16	NSH; 25	TAL; 8	CAL; 31	RCH; 20	NHA; 19	NZH; 31	CLT; 27	DOV; 14	NSH; 17	KEN; 38	MLW; 23	DAY; 11	CHI; 22	GTY; 23	PPR; 28	IRP; 22	MCH; 26	BRI; 21	DAR; 26	RCH; 40	DOV; 28	KAN; 28	CLT; 17	MEM; 21	ATL; 27	CAR; 24	PHO; 25	HOM; 28		20th	3158	
2007	Mac Hill Motorsports	56	Chevy	DAY	CAL	MXC	LVS	ATL	BRI	NSH	TEX	PHO	TAL	RCH	DAR	CLT	DOV	NSH	KEN	MLW	NHA	DAY; 38	CHI	GTY	IRP	CGV	GLN	MCH	BRI	CAL	RCH	DOV	KAN	CLT	MEM	TEX	PHO	HOM	145th	49	
2009	Mac Hill Motorsports	56	Chevy	DAY; DNQ	CAL	LVS	BRI	TEX	NSH	PHO	TAL	RCH	DAR	CLT	DOV	NSH	KEN	MLW	NHA	DAY	CHI	GTY	IRP	IOW	GLN	MCH	BRI	CGV	ATL	RCH	DOV	KAN	CAL	CLT	MEM	TEX	PHO	HOM	NA	-	
^{†} – Qualified but replaced by Mark Green

==== Camping World Truck Series ====
NASCAR Camping World Truck Series results
Year	Team	No.	Make	1	2	3	4	5	6	7	8	9	10	11	12	13	14	15	16	17	18	19	20	21	22	23	24	25	NCWTC	Pts	Ref
2007	Key Motorsports	44	Chevy	DAY; 32	CAL	ATL	MAR	KAN	CLT	MFD	DOV	TEX	MCH	MLW	MEM	KEN	IRP	NSH	BRI	GTW	NHA	LVS	TAL	MAR	ATL	TEX	PHO	HOM	101st	67	
2008	Brevak Racing	31	Dodge	DAY; 18	CAL	ATL	MAR	KAN	CLT	MFD	DOV	TEX	MCH	MLW	MEM	KEN	IRP	NSH	BRI	GTW	NHA	LVS	TAL	MAR	ATL	TEX	PHO	HOM	80th	109	
2009	Derrike Cope Inc.	74	Dodge	DAY; 20	CAL	ATL	MAR	KAN	CLT	DOV	TEX	MCH	MLW	MEM	KEN	IRP	NSH	BRI	CHI	IOW	GTW	NHA	LVS	MAR	TAL	TEX	PHO	HOM	87th	103	

=== ARCA Re/Max Series ===
(key) (Bold – Pole position awarded by qualifying time. Italics – Pole position earned by points standings or practice time. * – Most laps led.)

ARCA Re/Max Series results
Year	Team	No.	Make	1	2	3	4	5	6	7	8	9	10	11	12	13	14	15	16	17	18	19	20	21	22	23	ARMC	Pts	Ref
2000	A. J. Foyt Racing	41	Pontiac	DAY	SLM	AND	CLT	KIL	FRS	MCH	POC	TOL	KEN	BLN	POC	WIN	ISF	KEN	DSF	SLM	CLT; 35	TAL	ATL; DNQ				139th	55	
2005	A. J. Foyt Racing	16	Dodge	DAY; 12	NSH	SLM	KEN	TOL	LAN	MIL	POC	MCH	KAN	KEN	BLN	POC	GTW	LER	NSH	MCH	ISF	TOL	DSF	CHI	SLM	TAL	116th	170	

=== IndyCar Series ===
Year	Team	No.	Chassis	Engine	1	2	3	4	5	6	7	8	9	10	11	12	13	14	15	16	17	Rank	Points	Ref
2004	A. J. Foyt Enterprises	41	G-Force	Toyota	HMS	PHX	MOT	INDY; 32	TXS	RIR	KAN	NSH	MIL	MIS	KTY	PPI	NZR	CHI	FON	TX2		37th	10	
2005	A. J. Foyt Enterprises	41	Panoz	Toyota	HMS	PHX	STP	MOT	INDY; 33	TXS	RIR	KAN	NSH	MIL	MIS	KTY	PPIR	SNM	CHI	WGL	FON	38th	10	
2006	A. J. Foyt Enterprises	41	Dallara	Honda	HMS	STP	MOT	INDY; 30	WGL	TXS	RIR	KAN	NSH	MIL	MIS	KTY	SNM	CHI				38th	10	

=== Indy 500 results ===
Year	Chassis	Engine	Start	Finish	Team
2004	Dallara	Toyota	22nd	32nd	Foyt
2005	Dallara	Toyota	30th	33rd	Foyt
2006	Dallara	Honda	23rd	30th	Foyt
