= 2004 Pocono 500 =

Race details
- Race 14 of 36 in the 2004 NASCAR Nextel Cup Series
- The 2004 Pocono 500 program cover, featuring Tony Stewart, winner of the 2003 Pocono 500.
- Date: June 13, 2004
- Official name: 23rd Annual Pocono 500
- Location: Long Pond, Pennsylvania, Pocono Raceway
- Course: Permanent racing facility
- Course length: 2.5 miles (4.0 km)
- Distance: 200 laps, 500 mi (804.672 km)
- Scheduled distance: 200 laps, 500 mi (804.672 km)
- Average speed: 112.129 miles per hour (180.454 km/h)
- Attendance: 90,000

Pole position
Driver	Kasey Kahne	Evernham Motorsports
- Time: 52.164

Most laps led
Driver	Jimmie Johnson	Hendrick Motorsports
- Laps: 126

Winner
No. 48	Jimmie Johnson	Hendrick Motorsports

Television in the United States
- Network: FOX
- Announcers: Mike Joy, Larry McReynolds, Darrell Waltrip

Radio in the United States
- Radio: Motor Racing Network

The 2004 Pocono 500 was the 14th stock car race of the 2004 NASCAR Nextel Cup Series season and the 23rd iteration of the event. The race was held on Sunday, June 13, 2004, before a crowd of 90,000 in Long Pond, Pennsylvania, at Pocono Raceway, a 2.5 miles (4.0 km) triangular permanent course. The race took the scheduled 200 laps to complete. At race's end, Jimmie Johnson of Hendrick Motorsports would win the race under caution, after Jeff Burton blew an engine on lap 196. The win was Johnson's ninth NASCAR Nextel Cup Series career win and his third win of the season. To fill out the podium, Jeremy Mayfield of Evernham Motorsports and Bobby Labonte of Joe Gibbs Racing would finish second and third, respectively.

== Background ==
The layout of Pocono Raceway, the venue where the race was held.

The race was held at Pocono Raceway, which is a three-turn superspeedway located in Long Pond, Pennsylvania. The track hosts two annual NASCAR Sprint Cup Series races, as well as one Xfinity Series and Camping World Truck Series event. Until 2019, the track also hosted an IndyCar Series race.

Pocono Raceway is one of a very few NASCAR tracks not owned by either Speedway Motorsports, Inc. or International Speedway Corporation. It is operated by the Igdalsky siblings Brandon, Nicholas, and sister Ashley, and cousins Joseph IV and Chase Mattioli, all of whom are third-generation members of the family-owned Mattco Inc, started by Joseph II and Rose Mattioli.

Outside of the NASCAR races, the track is used throughout the year by Sports Car Club of America (SCCA) and motorcycle clubs as well as racing schools and an IndyCar race. The triangular oval also has three separate infield sections of racetrack – North Course, East Course and South Course. Each of these infield sections use a separate portion of the tri-oval to complete the track. During regular non-race weekends, multiple clubs can use the track by running on different infield sections. Also some of the infield sections can be run in either direction, or multiple infield sections can be put together – such as running the North Course and the South Course and using the tri-oval to connect the two.

=== Entry list ===
#	Driver	Team	Make
0	Ward Burton	Haas CNC Racing	Chevrolet
00	Carl Long	McGlynn Racing	Chevrolet
01	Joe Nemechek	MBV Motorsports	Chevrolet
2	Rusty Wallace	Penske-Jasper Racing	Dodge
02	Andy Belmont*	SCORE Motorsports	Pontiac
4	Jimmy Spencer	Morgan–McClure Motorsports	Chevrolet
5	Terry Labonte	Hendrick Motorsports	Chevrolet
6	Mark Martin	Roush Racing	Ford
8	Dale Earnhardt, Jr.	Dale Earnhardt, Inc.	Chevrolet
9	Kasey Kahne	Evernham Motorsports	Dodge
10	Scott Riggs	MBV Motorsports	Chevrolet
12	Ryan Newman	Penske-Jasper Racing	Dodge
15	Michael Waltrip	Dale Earnhardt, Inc.	Chevrolet
16	Greg Biffle	Roush Racing	Ford
17	Matt Kenseth	Roush Racing	Ford
18	Bobby Labonte	Joe Gibbs Racing	Chevrolet
19	Jeremy Mayfield	Evernham Motorsports	Dodge
20	Tony Stewart	Joe Gibbs Racing	Chevrolet
21	Ricky Rudd	Wood Brothers Racing	Ford
22	Scott Wimmer	Bill Davis Racing	Dodge
24	Jeff Gordon	Hendrick Motorsports	Chevrolet
25	Brian Vickers	Hendrick Motorsports	Chevrolet
29	Kevin Harvick	Richard Childress Racing	Chevrolet
30	Dave Blaney	Richard Childress Racing	Chevrolet
31	Robby Gordon	Richard Childress Racing	Chevrolet
32	Ricky Craven	PPI Motorsports	Chevrolet
37	Todd Bodine	R&J Racing	Dodge
38	Elliott Sadler	Robert Yates Racing	Ford
40	Sterling Marlin	Chip Ganassi Racing	Dodge
41	Casey Mears	Chip Ganassi Racing	Dodge
42	Jamie McMurray	Chip Ganassi Racing	Dodge
43	Jeff Green	Petty Enterprises	Dodge
45	Kyle Petty	Petty Enterprises	Dodge
48	Jimmie Johnson	Hendrick Motorsports	Chevrolet
49	Ken Schrader	BAM Racing	Dodge
50	P. J. Jones	Arnold Motorsports	Dodge
51	Kevin Lepage	Competitive Edge Motorsports	Chevrolet
52	Stan Boyd*	Rick Ware Racing	Dodge
72	Kirk Shelmerdine	Kirk Shelmerdine Racing	Ford
77	Brendan Gaughan	Penske-Jasper Racing	Dodge
80	Andy Hillenburg	Hover Motorsports	Ford
88	Dale Jarrett	Robert Yates Racing	Ford
89	Morgan Shepherd	Shepherd Racing Ventures	Dodge
94	Stanton Barrett	W. W. Motorsports	Chevrolet
97	Kurt Busch	Roush Racing	Ford
98	Geoff Bodine	Mach 1 Motorsports	Ford
99	Jeff Burton	Roush Racing	Ford
Official entry list

== Practice ==
=== First practice ===
The first practice session would take place on Friday, June 11, at 11:20 AM EST, and would last for two hours. Brian Vickers of Hendrick Motorsports would set the fastest time in the session, with a 52.254 and an average speed of 172.236 miles per hour (277.187 km/h).

Pos.	#	Driver	Team	Make	Time	Speed
1	25	Brian Vickers	Hendrick Motorsports	Chevrolet	52.254	172.236
2	48	Jimmie Johnson	Hendrick Motorsports	Chevrolet	52.327	171.995
3	38	Elliott Sadler	Robert Yates Racing	Ford	52.412	171.716
Official first practice results

=== Second practice ===
The second practice session would occur on Saturday, June 12, at 9:30 AM EST, and would last for 45 minutes. Mark Martin of Roush Racing would set the fastest time in the session, with a 53.731 and an average speed of 167.501 miles per hour (269.567 km/h).

Pos.	#	Driver	Team	Make	Time	Speed
1	6	Mark Martin	Roush Racing	Ford	53.731	167.501
2	40	Sterling Marlin	Chip Ganassi Racing	Dodge	53.762	167.404
3	41	Casey Mears	Chip Ganassi Racing	Dodge	53.852	167.125
Official second practice results

=== Third and final practice ===
The third and final practice session, sometimes referred to as Happy Hour, would occur on Saturday, June 12, at 11:10 AM EST, and would last for 45 minutes. Kasey Kahne of Evernham Motorsports would set the fastest time in the session, with a 53.681 and an average speed of 167.657 miles per hour (269.818 km/h).

Pos.	#	Driver	Team	Make	Time	Speed
1	9	Kasey Kahne	Evernham Motorsports	Dodge	53.681	167.657
2	19	Jeremy Mayfield	Evernham Motorsports	Dodge	53.804	167.274
3	24	Jeff Gordon	Hendrick Motorsports	Chevrolet	53.841	167.159
Official Happy Hour practice results

== Qualifying ==
Qualifying would occur on Friday, June 11, at 3:05 PM EST. Each driver would have two laps to set a fastest time; the fastest of the two would count as their official qualifying lap. Positions 1-38 would be decided on time, while positions 39-43 would be based on provisionals. Four spots are awarded by the use of provisionals based on owner's points. The fifth is awarded to a past champion who has not otherwise qualified for the race. If no past champ needs the provisional, the next team in the owner points will be awarded a provisional.

Kasey Kahne of Evernham Motorsports would win the pole, setting a lap of 52.164 and an average speed of 172.533 miles per hour (277.665 km/h).

Two drivers would fail to qualify: Stanton Barrett and Andy Hillenburg.

=== Full qualifying results ===
Pos.	#	Driver	Team	Make	Time	Speed
1	9	Kasey Kahne	Evernham Motorsports	Dodge	52.164	172.533
2	25	Brian Vickers	Hendrick Motorsports	Chevrolet	52.232	172.308
3	01	Joe Nemechek	MBV Motorsports	Chevrolet	52.270	172.183
4	6	Mark Martin	Roush Racing	Ford	52.360	171.887
5	48	Jimmie Johnson	Hendrick Motorsports	Chevrolet	52.379	171.825
6	24	Jeff Gordon	Hendrick Motorsports	Chevrolet	52.391	171.785
7	19	Jeremy Mayfield	Evernham Motorsports	Dodge	52.406	171.736
8	20	Tony Stewart	Joe Gibbs Racing	Chevrolet	52.426	171.671
9	16	Greg Biffle	Roush Racing	Ford	52.484	171.481
10	88	Dale Jarrett	Robert Yates Racing	Ford	52.552	171.259
11	12	Ryan Newman	Penske-Jasper Racing	Dodge	52.557	171.243
12	38	Elliott Sadler	Robert Yates Racing	Ford	52.608	171.077
13	31	Robby Gordon	Richard Childress Racing	Chevrolet	52.619	171.041
14	42	Jamie McMurray	Chip Ganassi Racing	Dodge	52.652	170.934
15	17	Matt Kenseth	Roush Racing	Ford	52.673	170.865
16	8	Dale Earnhardt Jr.	Dale Earnhardt, Inc.	Chevrolet	52.820	170.390
17	18	Bobby Labonte	Joe Gibbs Racing	Chevrolet	52.823	170.380
18	49	Ken Schrader	BAM Racing	Dodge	52.827	170.367
19	5	Terry Labonte	Hendrick Motorsports	Chevrolet	52.849	170.296
20	40	Sterling Marlin	Chip Ganassi Racing	Dodge	52.859	170.264
21	41	Casey Mears	Chip Ganassi Racing	Dodge	52.901	170.129
22	15	Michael Waltrip	Dale Earnhardt, Inc.	Chevrolet	52.960	169.940
23	29	Kevin Harvick	Richard Childress Racing	Chevrolet	52.973	169.898
24	22	Scott Wimmer	Bill Davis Racing	Dodge	53.069	169.590
25	45	Kyle Petty	Petty Enterprises	Dodge	53.075	169.571
26	0	Ward Burton	Haas CNC Racing	Chevrolet	53.101	169.488
27	97	Kurt Busch	Roush Racing	Ford	53.120	169.428
28	37	Todd Bodine	R&J Racing	Dodge	53.147	169.342
29	30	Dave Blaney	Richard Childress Racing	Chevrolet	53.205	169.157
30	2	Rusty Wallace	Penske-Jasper Racing	Dodge	53.306	168.837
31	77	Brendan Gaughan	Penske-Jasper Racing	Dodge	53.318	168.798
32	43	Jeff Green	Petty Enterprises	Dodge	53.418	168.482
33	4	Jimmy Spencer	Morgan–McClure Motorsports	Chevrolet	53.576	167.986
34	32	Ricky Craven	PPI Motorsports	Chevrolet	53.655	167.738
35	21	Ricky Rudd	Wood Brothers Racing	Ford	53.667	167.701
36	51	Kevin Lepage	Competitive Edge Motorsports	Chevrolet	53.789	167.320
37	50	P. J. Jones	Arnold Motorsports	Dodge	54.148	166.211
38	00	Carl Long	McGlynn Racing	Chevrolet	54.308	165.721
Provisionals
39	99	Jeff Burton	Roush Racing	Ford	—	—
40	10	Scott Riggs	MBV Motorsports	Chevrolet	55.540	162.045
41	89	Morgan Shepherd	Shepherd Racing Ventures	Dodge	—	—
42	72	Kirk Shelmerdine	Kirk Shelmerdine Racing	Ford	55.097	163.348
43	98	Geoff Bodine	Mach 1 Motorsports	Ford	54.425	165.365
Failed to qualify or withdrew
44	94	Stanton Barrett	W. W. Motorsports	Chevrolet	54.322	165.679
45	80	Andy Hillenburg	Hover Motorsports	Ford	56.058	160.548
WD	02	Andy Belmont	SCORE Motorsports	Pontiac	—	—
WD	52	Stan Boyd	Rick Ware Racing	Dodge	—	—
Official qualifying results

== Race results ==
Fin	St	#	Driver	Team	Make	Laps	Led	Status	Pts	Winnings
1	5	48	Jimmie Johnson	Hendrick Motorsports	Chevrolet	200	126	running	190	$186,950
2	7	19	Jeremy Mayfield	Evernham Motorsports	Dodge	200	5	running	175	$149,495
3	17	18	Bobby Labonte	Joe Gibbs Racing	Chevrolet	200	1	running	170	$139,953
4	6	24	Jeff Gordon	Hendrick Motorsports	Chevrolet	200	19	running	165	$132,858
5	27	97	Kurt Busch	Roush Racing	Ford	200	0	running	155	$95,600
6	16	8	Dale Earnhardt Jr.	Dale Earnhardt, Inc.	Chevrolet	200	0	running	150	$121,718
7	19	5	Terry Labonte	Hendrick Motorsports	Chevrolet	200	1	running	151	$96,640
8	13	31	Robby Gordon	Richard Childress Racing	Chevrolet	200	0	running	142	$98,377
9	14	42	Jamie McMurray	Chip Ganassi Racing	Dodge	200	0	running	138	$75,390
10	21	41	Casey Mears	Chip Ganassi Racing	Dodge	200	0	running	134	$82,090
11	9	16	Greg Biffle	Roush Racing	Ford	200	2	running	135	$71,240
12	12	38	Elliott Sadler	Robert Yates Racing	Ford	200	0	running	127	$96,183
13	2	25	Brian Vickers	Hendrick Motorsports	Chevrolet	200	1	running	129	$71,215
14	1	9	Kasey Kahne	Evernham Motorsports	Dodge	200	4	running	126	$107,990
15	32	43	Jeff Green	Petty Enterprises	Dodge	200	0	running	118	$87,740
16	40	10	Scott Riggs	MBV Motorsports	Chevrolet	200	0	running	115	$89,777
17	26	0	Ward Burton	Haas CNC Racing	Chevrolet	200	0	running	112	$59,290
18	3	01	Joe Nemechek	MBV Motorsports	Chevrolet	200	10	running	114	$85,090
19	35	21	Ricky Rudd	Wood Brothers Racing	Ford	200	0	running	106	$84,696
20	23	29	Kevin Harvick	Richard Childress Racing	Chevrolet	200	0	running	103	$95,593
21	15	17	Matt Kenseth	Roush Racing	Ford	200	5	running	105	$105,918
22	37	50	P. J. Jones	Arnold Motorsports	Dodge	198	1	running	102	$57,790
23	33	4	Jimmy Spencer	Morgan–McClure Motorsports	Chevrolet	198	0	running	94	$68,890
24	39	99	Jeff Burton	Roush Racing	Ford	196	0	engine	91	$90,632
25	18	49	Ken Schrader	BAM Racing	Dodge	196	0	running	88	$56,915
26	10	88	Dale Jarrett	Robert Yates Racing	Ford	195	2	engine	90	$88,082
27	8	20	Tony Stewart	Joe Gibbs Racing	Chevrolet	194	1	running	87	$100,393
28	43	98	Geoff Bodine	Mach 1 Motorsports	Ford	194	0	running	79	$53,465
29	29	30	Dave Blaney	Richard Childress Racing	Chevrolet	191	0	running	76	$63,790
30	11	12	Ryan Newman	Penske-Jasper Racing	Dodge	183	18	crash	78	$100,007
31	20	40	Sterling Marlin	Chip Ganassi Racing	Dodge	176	2	crash	75	$86,490
32	30	2	Rusty Wallace	Penske-Jasper Racing	Dodge	167	0	crash	67	$96,673
33	22	15	Michael Waltrip	Dale Earnhardt, Inc.	Chevrolet	166	0	crash	64	$89,621
34	34	32	Ricky Craven	PPI Motorsports	Chevrolet	152	0	engine	61	$68,829
35	24	22	Scott Wimmer	Bill Davis Racing	Dodge	125	0	crash	58	$60,265
36	4	6	Mark Martin	Roush Racing	Ford	112	2	engine	60	$60,065
37	25	45	Kyle Petty	Petty Enterprises	Dodge	101	0	engine	52	$51,900
38	41	89	Morgan Shepherd	Shepherd Racing Ventures	Dodge	71	0	handling	49	$51,785
39	31	77	Brendan Gaughan	Penske-Jasper Racing	Dodge	59	0	engine	46	$59,660
40	42	72	Kirk Shelmerdine	Kirk Shelmerdine Racing	Ford	42	0	wheel bearing	43	$51,505
41	38	00	Carl Long	McGlynn Racing	Chevrolet	39	0	crash	40	$51,365
42	28	37	Todd Bodine	R&J Racing	Dodge	11	0	overheating	37	$51,275
43	36	51	Kevin Lepage	Competitive Edge Motorsports	Chevrolet	9	0	overheating	34	$51,459
Official race results

Previous race: 2004 MBNA America 400 "A Salute to Heroes"	NASCAR Nextel Cup Series; 2004 season	Next race: 2004 DHL 400
