= 2004 Aaron's 499 =

Race details
- Race 9 of 36 in the 2004 NASCAR Nextel Cup Series
- The 2004 Aaron's 499 program cover, featuring Dale Earnhardt Jr., winner of the 2003 race.
- Date: April 25, 2004
- Official name: 35th Annual Aaron's 499
- Location: Lincoln, Alabama, Talladega Superspeedway
- Course: Permanent racing facility
- Course length: 2.66 miles (4.28 km)
- Distance: 188 laps, 500.08 mi (804.8 km)
- Scheduled distance: 188 laps, 500.08 mi (804.8 km)
- Average speed: 129.396 miles per hour (208.243 km/h)
- Attendance: 155,000

Pole position
Driver	Ricky Rudd	Wood Brothers Racing
- Time: 50.089

Most laps led
Driver	Dale Earnhardt Jr.	Dale Earnhardt, Inc.
- Laps: 57

Winner
No. 24	Jeff Gordon	Hendrick Motorsports

Television in the United States
- Network: FOX
- Announcers: Mike Joy, Larry McReynolds, Darrell Waltrip

Radio in the United States
- Radio: Motor Racing Network

The 2004 Aaron's 499 was the ninth stock car race of the 2004 NASCAR Nextel Cup Series season and the 35th iteration of the event. The race was held on Sunday, April 25, 2004, before a crowd of 155,000 in Lincoln, Alabama at Talladega Superspeedway, a 2.66 miles (4.28 km) permanent triangle-shaped superspeedway. The race took the scheduled 188 laps to complete. In a controversial end to the race, Jeff Gordon of Hendrick Motorsports would win the race under caution over fan favorite Dale Earnhardt Jr. of Dale Earnhardt, Inc., after Brian Vickers caused a caution with 5 to go. The win was Gordon’s 65th career NASCAR Nextel Cup Series win and his first of the season. To fill out the podium, Kevin Harvick of Richard Childress Racing would finish third, after a review of the results of the last scoring loop.

The race is primarily remembered for its controversial finish. With 5 to go, Brian Vickers would spin in Turn 3, making NASCAR throw a caution. At the moment of caution, Jeff Gordon led fan favorite Dale Earnhardt Jr. in the middle of the turn. However, Dale Earnhardt Jr. would pass Gordon coming to the line. This led many to believe that Earnhardt Jr. had taken the lead, and since no green–white–checkered finish rule had been instituted, Earnhardt Jr. had won, to the pleasure of fans. However, the season before, NASCAR had instituted a new rule that eliminated racing back to the line. In its place, now, the field would be frozen at the last scoring loop when the caution came out. As a result, Gordon, who led at the last scoring loop, took the win. This angered many in the audience, as they thought that Earnhardt Jr. had been robbed of a win. During Gordon's burnout, many pelted Gordon's car with beer cans and seat cushions, littering both Gordon's car and the racetrack. In a statement released by NASCAR spokesman Jim Hunter, he said that NASCAR did not throw a one lap shootout for safety reasons, stating "Here and at Daytona we're not going to have a one-lap shootout just because of safety. We're just not going to do that." Earnhardt Jr. had stated that NASCAR had made the right call, saying that "As much as it sucks not to win the race and get the trophy, I'm glad one of those calls finally went against me. It's going to shut a lot of people up." Gordon would take the beer can throwing in a light-hearted manner, saying in interviews years after that "[That was] the greatest day of my life... They were going crazy on my ass. Honestly, we had to have a lot of security.”

== Background ==
The layout of Talladega Superspeedway, the venue where the race was held.

Talladega Superspeedway, originally known as Alabama International Motor Superspeedway (AIMS), is a motorsports complex located north of Talladega, Alabama. It is located on the former Anniston Air Force Base in the small city of Lincoln. The track is a tri-oval and was constructed in the 1960s by the International Speedway Corporation, a business controlled by the France family. Talladega is most known for its steep banking and the unique location of the start/finish line that's located just past the exit to pit road. The track currently hosts the NASCAR series such as the NASCAR Cup Series, Xfinity Series and the Gander RV & Outdoors Truck Series. Talladega is the longest NASCAR oval with a length of 2.66-mile-long (4.28 km) tri-oval like the Daytona International Speedway, which also is a 2.5-mile-long (4 km) tri-oval.

=== Entry list ===
#	Driver	Team	Make
0	Ward Burton	Haas CNC Racing	Chevrolet
00	Kenny Wallace	Michael Waltrip Racing	Chevrolet
01	Joe Nemechek	MBV Motorsports	Chevrolet
2	Rusty Wallace	Penske-Jasper Racing	Dodge
02	Andy Belmont*	SCORE Motorsports	Chevrolet
4	Jimmy Spencer	Morgan–McClure Motorsports	Chevrolet
04	Eric McClure	Morgan–McClure Motorsports	Chevrolet
5	Terry Labonte	Hendrick Motorsports	Chevrolet
6	Mark Martin	Roush Racing	Ford
8	Dale Earnhardt Jr.	Dale Earnhardt, Inc.	Chevrolet
9	Kasey Kahne	Evernham Motorsports	Dodge
09	Johnny Benson Jr.	Phoenix Racing	Dodge
10	Scott Riggs	MBV Motorsports	Chevrolet
12	Ryan Newman	Penske-Jasper Racing	Dodge
14	Larry Foyt	A. J. Foyt Enterprises	Dodge
15	Michael Waltrip	Dale Earnhardt, Inc.	Chevrolet
16	Greg Biffle	Roush Racing	Ford
17	Matt Kenseth	Roush Racing	Ford
18	Bobby Labonte	Joe Gibbs Racing	Chevrolet
19	Jeremy Mayfield	Evernham Motorsports	Dodge
20	Tony Stewart	Joe Gibbs Racing	Chevrolet
21	Ricky Rudd	Wood Brothers Racing	Ford
22	Scott Wimmer	Bill Davis Racing	Dodge
23	Dave Blaney	Bill Davis Racing	Dodge
24	Jeff Gordon	Hendrick Motorsports	Chevrolet
25	Brian Vickers	Hendrick Motorsports	Chevrolet
29	Kevin Harvick	Richard Childress Racing	Chevrolet
30	Johnny Sauter	Richard Childress Racing	Chevrolet
31	Robby Gordon	Richard Childress Racing	Chevrolet
32	Ricky Craven	PPI Motorsports	Chevrolet
33	Kerry Earnhardt	Richard Childress Racing	Chevrolet
38	Elliott Sadler	Robert Yates Racing	Ford
40	Sterling Marlin	Chip Ganassi Racing	Dodge
41	Casey Mears	Chip Ganassi Racing	Dodge
42	Jamie McMurray	Chip Ganassi Racing	Dodge
43	Jeff Green	Petty Enterprises	Dodge
45	Kyle Petty	Petty Enterprises	Dodge
48	Jimmie Johnson	Hendrick Motorsports	Chevrolet
49	Ken Schrader	BAM Racing	Dodge
50	Derrike Cope	Arnold Motorsports	Dodge
72	Kirk Shelmerdine	Kirk Shelmerdine Racing	Ford
77	Brendan Gaughan	Penske-Jasper Racing	Dodge
80	Andy Hillenburg*	Hover Motorsports	Ford
88	Dale Jarrett	Robert Yates Racing	Ford
89	Morgan Shepherd	Shepherd Racing Ventures	Dodge
97	Kurt Busch	Roush Racing	Ford
98	Todd Bodine	Mach 1 Motorsports	Ford
99	Jeff Burton	Roush Racing	Ford
Official entry list

*Withdrew.

== Practice ==
=== First practice ===
The first practice session would take place on Friday, April 23, at 12:00 PM EST, and would last for one hour and 30 minutes. Ricky Rudd of Wood Brothers Racing would set the fastest time in the session, with a 50.126 and an average speed of 191.039 miles per hour (307.447 km/h).

Pos.	#	Driver	Team	Make	Time	Speed
1	21	Ricky Rudd	Wood Brothers Racing	Ford	50.126	191.039
2	8	Dale Earnhardt Jr.	Dale Earnhardt, Inc.	Chevrolet	50.256	190.544
3	38	Elliott Sadler	Robert Yates Racing	Ford	50.366	190.128
Full first practice results

=== Second practice ===
The second practice session would occur on Saturday, April 24, at 10:30 AM EST, and would last for 45 minutes. Johnny Sauter of Richard Childress Racing would set the fastest time in the session, with a 48.744 and an average speed of 196.455 miles per hour (316.164 km/h).

Pos.	#	Driver	Team	Make	Time	Speed
1	30	Johnny Sauter	Richard Childress Racing	Chevrolet	48.744	196.455
2	32	Ricky Craven	PPI Motorsports	Chevrolet	48.765	196.370
3	22	Scott Wimmer	Bill Davis Racing	Dodge	48.804	196.213
Full second practice results

=== Third and final practice ===
The third and final practice session, sometimes referred to as Happy Hour, would occur on Saturday, April 24, at 12:10 PM EST, and would last for 45 minutes. Kevin Harvick of Richard Childress Racing would set the fastest time in the session, with a 49.064 and an average speed of 195.174 miles per hour (314.102 km/h).

Pos.	#	Driver	Team	Make	Time	Speed
1	29	Kevin Harvick	Richard Childress Racing	Chevrolet	49.064	195.174
2	23	Dave Blaney	Bill Davis Racing	Dodge	49.165	194.773
3	25	Brian Vickers	Hendrick Motorsports	Chevrolet	49.182	194.705
Full Happy Hour practice results

== Qualifying ==
Qualifying would take place on Friday, April 23, at 3:10 PM CST. Each driver would have two laps to set a fastest time; the fastest of the two would count as their official qualifying lap. Positions 1-38 would be decided on time, while positions 39-43 would be based on provisionals. Four spots are awarded by the use of provisionals based on owner's points. The fifth is awarded to a past champion who has not otherwise qualified for the race. If no past champ needs the provisional, the next team in the owner points will be awarded a provisional.

Ricky Rudd of Wood Brothers Racing would win the pole, setting a time of 50.089 and an average speed of 191.180 miles per hour (307.674 km/h).

Three drivers would fail to qualify: Larry Foyt, Todd Bodine, and Kirk Shelmerdine.

=== Full qualifying results ===
Pos.	#	Driver	Team	Make	Time	Speed
1	21	Ricky Rudd	Wood Brothers Racing	Ford	50.089	191.180
2	15	Michael Waltrip	Dale Earnhardt, Inc.	Chevrolet	50.143	190.974
3	8	Dale Earnhardt Jr.	Dale Earnhardt, Inc.	Chevrolet	50.311	190.336
4	01	Joe Nemechek	MBV Motorsports	Chevrolet	50.371	190.109
5	10	Scott Riggs	MBV Motorsports	Chevrolet	50.395	190.019
6	6	Mark Martin	Roush Racing	Ford	50.425	189.906
7	88	Dale Jarrett	Robert Yates Racing	Ford	50.434	189.872
8	48	Jimmie Johnson	Hendrick Motorsports	Chevrolet	50.490	189.661
9	40	Sterling Marlin	Chip Ganassi Racing	Dodge	50.527	189.522
10	0	Ward Burton	Haas CNC Racing	Chevrolet	50.558	189.406
11	24	Jeff Gordon	Hendrick Motorsports	Chevrolet	50.561	189.395
12	38	Elliott Sadler	Robert Yates Racing	Ford	50.599	189.253
13	5	Terry Labonte	Hendrick Motorsports	Chevrolet	50.605	189.230
14	29	Kevin Harvick	Richard Childress Racing	Chevrolet	50.618	189.182
15	43	Jeff Green	Petty Enterprises	Dodge	50.639	189.103
16	41	Casey Mears	Chip Ganassi Racing	Dodge	50.644	189.085
17	12	Ryan Newman	Penske-Jasper Racing	Dodge	50.675	188.969
18	16	Greg Biffle	Roush Racing	Ford	50.690	188.913
19	18	Bobby Labonte	Joe Gibbs Racing	Chevrolet	50.705	188.857
20	77	Brendan Gaughan	Penske-Jasper Racing	Dodge	50.727	188.775
21	31	Robby Gordon	Richard Childress Racing	Chevrolet	50.745	188.708
22	97	Kurt Busch	Roush Racing	Ford	50.754	188.675
23	4	Jimmy Spencer	Morgan–McClure Motorsports	Chevrolet	50.763	188.641
24	32	Ricky Craven	PPI Motorsports	Chevrolet	50.778	188.586
25	99	Jeff Burton	Roush Racing	Ford	50.781	188.574
26	9	Kasey Kahne	Evernham Motorsports	Dodge	50.789	188.545
27	00	Kenny Wallace	Michael Waltrip Racing	Chevrolet	50.797	188.515
28	45	Kyle Petty	Petty Enterprises	Dodge	50.820	188.430
29	30	Johnny Sauter	Richard Childress Racing	Chevrolet	50.855	188.300
30	22	Scott Wimmer	Bill Davis Racing	Dodge	50.859	188.285
31	17	Matt Kenseth	Roush Racing	Ford	50.863	188.270
32	2	Rusty Wallace	Penske-Jasper Racing	Dodge	50.863	188.270
33	42	Jamie McMurray	Chip Ganassi Racing	Dodge	50.878	188.215
34	09	Johnny Benson Jr.	Phoenix Racing	Dodge	50.896	188.148
35	04	Eric McClure	Morgan–McClure Motorsports	Chevrolet	50.931	188.019
36	33	Kerry Earnhardt	Richard Childress Racing	Chevrolet	50.956	187.927
37	20	Tony Stewart	Joe Gibbs Racing	Chevrolet	50.960	187.912
38	19	Jeremy Mayfield	Evernham Motorsports	Dodge	50.980	187.838
Provisionals
39	25	Brian Vickers	Hendrick Motorsports	Chevrolet	51.010	187.728
40	49	Ken Schrader	BAM Racing	Dodge	51.103	187.386
41	50	Derrike Cope	Arnold Motorsports	Dodge	51.197	187.042
42	23	Dave Blaney	Bill Davis Racing	Dodge	51.129	187.291
43	89	Morgan Shepherd	Shepherd Racing Ventures	Dodge	52.312	183.055
Failed to qualify or withdrew
44	14	Larry Foyt	A. J. Foyt Enterprises	Dodge	51.470	186.050
45	98	Todd Bodine	Mach 1 Motorsports	Ford	52.787	181.408
46	72	Kirk Shelmerdine	Kirk Shelmerdine Racing	Ford	—	—
WD	02	Andy Belmont	SCORE Motorsports	Chevrolet	—	—
WD	80	Andy Hillenburg	Hover Motorsports	Ford	—	—
Official qualifying results

== Race results ==
Fin	St	#	Driver	Team	Make	Laps	Led	Status	Pts	Winnings
1	11	24	Jeff Gordon	Hendrick Motorsports	Chevrolet	188	15	running	185	$320,258
2	3	8	Dale Earnhardt Jr.	Dale Earnhardt, Inc.	Chevrolet	188	57	running	180	$241,433
3	14	29	Kevin Harvick	Richard Childress Racing	Chevrolet	188	14	running	170	$185,808
4	8	48	Jimmie Johnson	Hendrick Motorsports	Chevrolet	188	25	running	165	$139,655
5	21	31	Robby Gordon	Richard Childress Racing	Chevrolet	188	22	running	160	$139,927
6	6	6	Mark Martin	Roush Racing	Ford	188	6	running	155	$108,380
7	25	99	Jeff Burton	Roush Racing	Ford	188	0	running	146	$126,572
8	16	41	Casey Mears	Chip Ganassi Racing	Dodge	188	5	running	147	$108,205
9	33	42	Jamie McMurray	Chip Ganassi Racing	Dodge	188	4	running	143	$115,705
10	19	18	Bobby Labonte	Joe Gibbs Racing	Chevrolet	188	1	running	139	$126,313
11	17	12	Ryan Newman	Penske-Jasper Racing	Dodge	188	1	running	135	$123,592
12	2	15	Michael Waltrip	Dale Earnhardt, Inc.	Chevrolet	188	13	running	132	$112,301
13	20	77	Brendan Gaughan	Penske-Jasper Racing	Dodge	188	0	running	124	$89,015
14	29	30	Johnny Sauter	Richard Childress Racing	Chevrolet	188	0	running	121	$86,395
15	18	16	Greg Biffle	Roush Racing	Ford	188	1	running	123	$86,480
16	7	88	Dale Jarrett	Robert Yates Racing	Ford	188	3	running	120	$106,957
17	1	21	Ricky Rudd	Wood Brothers Racing	Ford	188	0	running	112	$106,281
18	30	22	Scott Wimmer	Bill Davis Racing	Dodge	188	2	running	114	$96,885
19	15	43	Jeff Green	Petty Enterprises	Dodge	188	0	running	106	$95,845
20	23	4	Jimmy Spencer	Morgan–McClure Motorsports	Chevrolet	188	2	running	108	$87,335
21	38	19	Jeremy Mayfield	Evernham Motorsports	Dodge	188	0	running	100	$90,095
22	37	20	Tony Stewart	Joe Gibbs Racing	Chevrolet	188	6	running	102	$114,353
23	40	49	Ken Schrader	BAM Racing	Dodge	188	0	running	94	$70,265
24	28	45	Kyle Petty	Petty Enterprises	Dodge	188	0	running	91	$77,949
25	13	5	Terry Labonte	Hendrick Motorsports	Chevrolet	188	1	running	93	$96,930
26	35	04	Eric McClure	Morgan–McClure Motorsports	Chevrolet	188	1	running	90	$65,175
27	39	25	Brian Vickers	Hendrick Motorsports	Chevrolet	188	2	running	87	$75,620
28	12	38	Elliott Sadler	Robert Yates Racing	Ford	185	1	running	84	$102,903
29	34	09	Johnny Benson Jr.	Phoenix Racing	Dodge	151	0	suspension	76	$63,910
30	26	9	Kasey Kahne	Evernham Motorsports	Dodge	150	0	running	73	$97,080
31	9	40	Sterling Marlin	Chip Ganassi Racing	Dodge	146	2	overheating	75	$99,050
32	4	01	Joe Nemechek	MBV Motorsports	Chevrolet	146	3	engine	72	$71,500
33	32	2	Rusty Wallace	Penske-Jasper Racing	Dodge	144	0	running	64	$107,108
34	5	10	Scott Riggs	MBV Motorsports	Chevrolet	144	0	running	61	$89,322
35	36	33	Kerry Earnhardt	Richard Childress Racing	Chevrolet	144	0	running	58	$63,005
36	22	97	Kurt Busch	Roush Racing	Ford	82	1	crash	60	$82,875
37	27	00	Kenny Wallace	Michael Waltrip Racing	Chevrolet	82	0	crash	52	$62,700
38	41	50	Derrike Cope	Arnold Motorsports	Dodge	82	0	crash	49	$62,350
39	42	23	Dave Blaney	Bill Davis Racing	Dodge	81	0	crash	46	$62,150
40	10	0	Ward Burton	Haas CNC Racing	Chevrolet	66	0	engine	43	$61,900
41	43	89	Morgan Shepherd	Shepherd Racing Ventures	Dodge	65	0	transmission	40	$61,705
42	31	17	Matt Kenseth	Roush Racing	Ford	59	0	engine	37	$112,298
43	24	32	Ricky Craven	PPI Motorsports	Chevrolet	7	0	engine	34	$69,581
Official race results

Previous race: 2004 Advance Auto Parts 500	NASCAR Nextel Cup Series; 2004 season	Next race: 2004 Auto Club 500
