= 2004 Dodge/Save Mart 350 =

Race details
- Race 16 of 36 in the 2004 NASCAR Nextel Cup Series
- The 2004 Dodge/Save Mart 350 program cover, featuring the cars of Evernham Motorsports.
- Date: June 27, 2004
- Official name: 16th Annual Dodge/Save Mart 350
- Location: Sonoma, California, Infineon Raceway
- Course: Permanent racing facility
- Course length: 1.99 miles (3.20 km)
- Distance: 110 laps, 218.9 mi (352.285 km)
- Scheduled distance: 110 laps, 218.9 mi (352.285 km)
- Average speed: 77.456 miles per hour (124.653 km/h)

Pole position
Driver	Jeff Gordon	Hendrick Motorsports
- Time: 1:15.968

Most laps led
Driver	Jeff Gordon	Hendrick Motorsports
- Laps: 92

Winner
No. 24	Jeff Gordon	Hendrick Motorsports

Television in the United States
- Network: FOX
- Announcers: Mike Joy, Larry McReynolds, Darrell Waltrip

Radio in the United States
- Radio: Performance Racing Network

The 2004 Dodge/Save Mart 350 was the 16th stock car race of the 2004 NASCAR Nextel Cup Series season and the 16th iteration of the event. The race was held on Sunday, June 27, 2004, in Sonoma, California, at the club layout in Infineon Raceway, a 1.99 miles (3.20 km) permanent road course layout. The race took the scheduled 110 laps to complete. At race's end, Jeff Gordon of Hendrick Motorsports would dominate the race to win his 67th career NASCAR Nextel Cup Series win and his third of the season. To fill out the podium, Jamie McMurray and Scott Pruett of Chip Ganassi Racing would finish second and third, respectively.

== Background ==
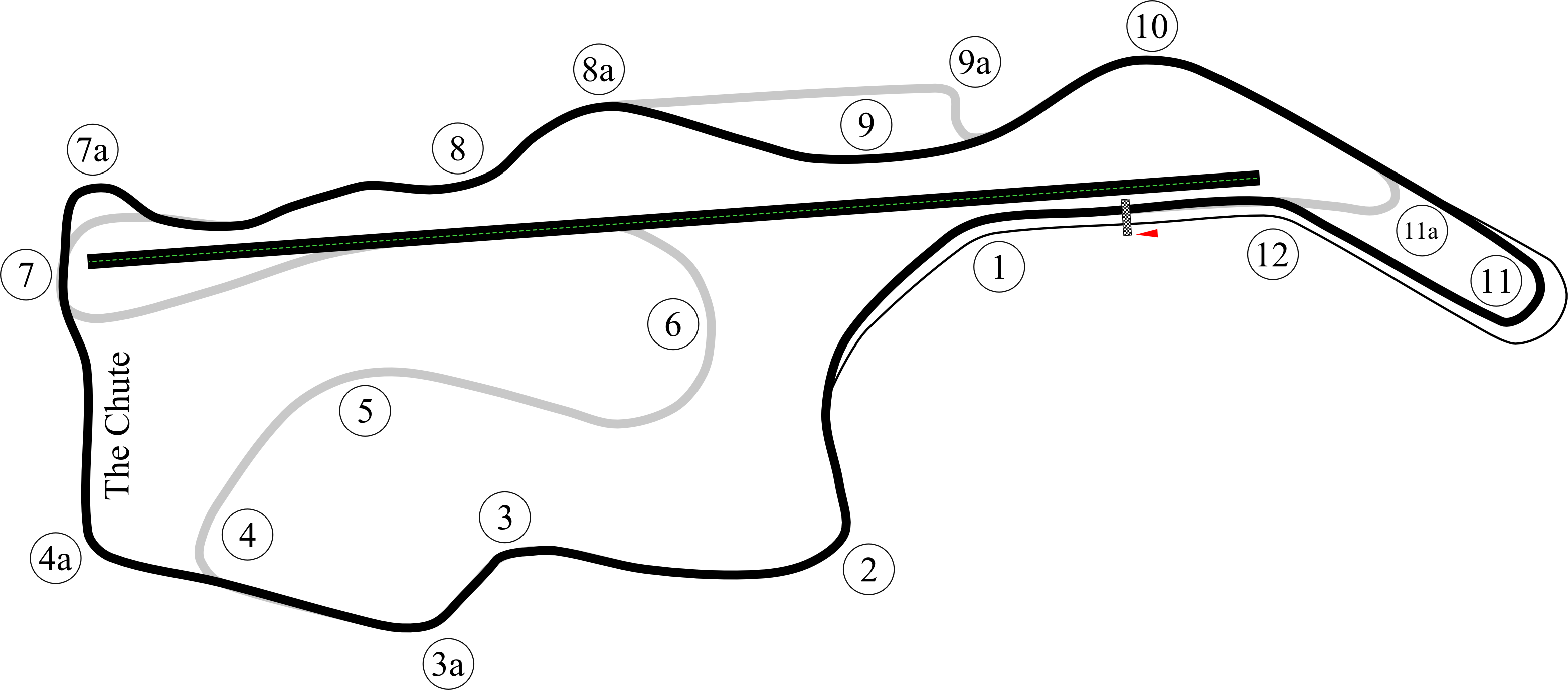
The layout of Infineon Raceway used by NASCAR at the time.

Infineon Raceway is one of two road courses to hold NASCAR races, the other being Watkins Glen International. The standard road course at Infineon Raceway is a 12-turn course that is 2.52 miles (4.06 km) long; the track was modified in 1998, adding the Chute, which bypassed turns 5 and 6, shortening the course to 1.95 miles (3.14 km). The Chute was only used for NASCAR events such as this race, and was criticized by many drivers, who preferred the full layout. In 2001, it was replaced with a 70-degree turn, 4A, bringing the track to its current dimensions of 1.99 miles (3.20 km).

=== Entry list ===
#	Driver	Team	Make
0	Ward Burton	Haas CNC Racing	Chevrolet
01	Joe Nemechek	MBV Motorsports	Chevrolet
2	Rusty Wallace	Penske-Jasper Racing	Dodge
02	Brandon Ash	Ash Motorsports	Ford
5	Terry Labonte	Hendrick Motorsports	Chevrolet
6	Mark Martin	Roush Racing	Ford
8	Dale Earnhardt Jr.	Dale Earnhardt, Inc.	Chevrolet
9	Kasey Kahne	Evernham Motorsports	Dodge
10	Scott Riggs	MBV Motorsports	Chevrolet
12	Ryan Newman	Penske-Jasper Racing	Dodge
15	Michael Waltrip	Dale Earnhardt, Inc.	Chevrolet
16	Greg Biffle	Roush Racing	Ford
17	Matt Kenseth	Roush Racing	Ford
18	Bobby Labonte	Joe Gibbs Racing	Chevrolet
19	Jeremy Mayfield	Evernham Motorsports	Dodge
20	Tony Stewart	Joe Gibbs Racing	Chevrolet
21	Ricky Rudd	Wood Brothers Racing	Ford
22	Scott Wimmer	Bill Davis Racing	Dodge
24	Jeff Gordon	Hendrick Motorsports	Chevrolet
25	Brian Vickers	Hendrick Motorsports	Chevrolet
29	Kevin Harvick	Richard Childress Racing	Chevrolet
30	Jim Inglebright	Richard Childress Racing	Chevrolet
31	Robby Gordon	Richard Childress Racing	Chevrolet
32	Ricky Craven	PPI Motorsports	Chevrolet
36	Boris Said	MB2 Motorsports	Chevrolet
38	Elliott Sadler	Robert Yates Racing	Ford
39	Scott Pruett	Chip Ganassi Racing	Dodge
40	Sterling Marlin	Chip Ganassi Racing	Dodge
41	Casey Mears	Chip Ganassi Racing	Dodge
42	Jamie McMurray	Chip Ganassi Racing	Dodge
43	Jeff Green	Petty Enterprises	Dodge
45	Kyle Petty	Petty Enterprises	Dodge
48	Jimmie Johnson	Hendrick Motorsports	Chevrolet
49	Ken Schrader	BAM Racing	Dodge
50	P. J. Jones	Arnold Motorsports	Dodge
52	Carl Long*	Rick Ware Racing	Dodge
59	Klaus Graf	BAM Racing	Dodge
61	Austin Cameron	Bill McAnally Racing	Chevrolet
72	Tom Hubert	Kirk Shelmerdine Racing	Ford
77	Brendan Gaughan	Penske-Jasper Racing	Dodge
88	Dale Jarrett	Robert Yates Racing	Ford
89	Morgan Shepherd	Shepherd Racing Ventures	Dodge
97	Kurt Busch	Roush Racing	Ford
98	Larry Gunselman	Mach 1 Motorsports	Ford
99	Jeff Burton	Roush Racing	Ford
Official entry list

*Withdrew.

== Practice ==
=== First practice ===
The first practice would occur on Friday, June 25, at 11:20 AM PST, and would last for two hours. Jeff Gordon of Hendrick Motorsports would set the fastest time in the session, with a lap of 1:15.363 and an average speed of 95.060 miles per hour (152.984 km/h).

Pos.	#	Driver	Team	Make	Time	Speed
1	24	Jeff Gordon	Hendrick Motorsports	Chevrolet	1:15.363	95.060
2	2	Rusty Wallace	Penske-Jasper Racing	Dodge	1:15.504	94.882
3	36	Boris Said	MB2 Motorsports	Chevrolet	1:15.726	94.604
Full first practice results

=== Second practice ===
The second practice would occur on Saturday, June 26, at 9:30 AM PST and would last for 45 minutes. Jeff Gordon of Hendrick Motorsports would set the fastest time in the session, with a lap of 1:15.867 and an average speed of 94.428 miles per hour (151.967 km/h).

Pos.	#	Driver	Team	Make	Time	Speed
1	24	Jeff Gordon	Hendrick Motorsports	Chevrolet	1:15.867	94.428
2	97	Kurt Busch	Roush Racing	Ford	1:16.032	94.224
3	29	Kevin Harvick	Richard Childress Racing	Chevrolet	1:16.223	93.987
Full second practice results

=== Third and final practice ===
The third and final practice session, sometimes referred to as Happy Hour, would occur on Saturday, June 26, at 11:10 AM PST and would last for 45 minutes. Jeff Gordon of Hendrick Motorsports would set the fastest time in the session, with a lap of 1:16.066 and an average speed of 94.181 miles per hour (151.570 km/h).

Pos.	#	Driver	Team	Make	Time	Speed
1	24	Jeff Gordon	Hendrick Motorsports	Chevrolet	1:16.066	94.181
2	2	Rusty Wallace	Penske-Jasper Racing	Dodge	1:16.210	94.003
3	42	Jamie McMurray	Chip Ganassi Racing	Dodge	1:16.220	93.991
Full Happy Hour practice results

== Qualifying ==
Qualifying was held on Friday, June 25, at 3:10 PM PST. Drivers would each have one lap to set a lap time. Positions 1-38 would be decided on time, while positions 39-43 would be based on provisionals. Four spots are awarded by the use of provisionals based on owner's points. The fifth is awarded to a past champion who has not otherwise qualified for the race. If no past champ needs the provisional, the next team in the owner points will be awarded a provisional.

Jeff Gordon of Hendrick Motorsports would win the pole, setting a new track record with a lap of 1:15.968 and an average speed of 94.303 miles per hour (151.766 km/h).

Multiple drivers would suffer incidents that would considerably slow down their lap times or make them not set a lap. Michael Waltrip would report smoke and blow an engine coming into Turn 7 on his lap. Scott Riggs would spin, but still complete his lap. Ricky Craven would spin in Turn 10

=== Full qualifying results ===
Pos.	#	Driver	Team	Make	Time	Speed
1	24	Jeff Gordon	Hendrick Motorsports	Chevrolet	1:15.968	94.303
2	2	Rusty Wallace	Penske-Jasper Racing	Dodge	1:16.072	94.174
3	97	Kurt Busch	Roush Racing	Ford	1:16.333	93.852
4	6	Mark Martin	Roush Racing	Ford	1:16.456	93.701
5	17	Matt Kenseth	Roush Racing	Ford	1:16.570	93.561
6	39	Scott Pruett	Chip Ganassi Racing	Dodge	1:16.658	93.454
7	16	Greg Biffle	Roush Racing	Ford	1:16.674	93.435
8	29	Kevin Harvick	Richard Childress Racing	Chevrolet	1:16.748	93.344
9	01	Joe Nemechek	MBV Motorsports	Chevrolet	1:16.827	93.248
10	18	Bobby Labonte	Joe Gibbs Racing	Chevrolet	1:16.873	93.193
11	42	Jamie McMurray	Chip Ganassi Racing	Dodge	1:16.997	93.043
12	21	Ricky Rudd	Wood Brothers Racing	Ford	1:17.074	92.950
13	99	Jeff Burton	Roush Racing	Ford	1:17.178	92.824
14	0	Ward Burton	Haas CNC Racing	Chevrolet	1:17.271	92.713
15	5	Terry Labonte	Hendrick Motorsports	Chevrolet	1:17.298	92.680
16	38	Elliott Sadler	Robert Yates Racing	Ford	1:17.415	92.540
17	20	Tony Stewart	Joe Gibbs Racing	Chevrolet	1:17.483	92.459
18	49	Ken Schrader	BAM Racing	Dodge	1:17.565	92.361
19	36	Boris Said	MB2 Motorsports	Chevrolet	1:17.595	92.326
20	8	Dale Earnhardt Jr.	Dale Earnhardt, Inc.	Chevrolet	1:17.748	92.144
21	19	Jeremy Mayfield	Evernham Motorsports	Dodge	1:17.765	92.124
22	12	Ryan Newman	Penske-Jasper Racing	Dodge	1:17.774	92.113
23	88	Dale Jarrett	Robert Yates Racing	Ford	1:17.866	92.004
24	31	Robby Gordon	Richard Childress Racing	Chevrolet	1:17.956	91.898
25	22	Scott Wimmer	Bill Davis Racing	Dodge	1:17.962	91.891
26	40	Sterling Marlin	Chip Ganassi Racing	Dodge	1:17.967	91.885
27	45	Kyle Petty	Petty Enterprises	Dodge	1:18.020	91.823
28	30	Jim Inglebright	Richard Childress Racing	Chevrolet	1:18.029	91.812
29	41	Casey Mears	Chip Ganassi Racing	Dodge	1:18.038	91.801
30	9	Kasey Kahne	Evernham Motorsports	Dodge	1:18.059	91.777
31	50	P. J. Jones	Arnold Motorsports	Dodge	1:18.183	91.631
32	61	Austin Cameron	Bill McAnally Racing	Chevrolet	1:18.501	91.260
33	77	Brendan Gaughan	Penske-Jasper Racing	Dodge	1:18.514	91.245
34	48	Jimmie Johnson	Hendrick Motorsports	Chevrolet	1:18.599	91.146
35	72	Tom Hubert	Kirk Shelmerdine Racing	Ford	1:18.974	90.713
36	43	Jeff Green	Petty Enterprises	Dodge	1:19.081	90.591
37	02	Brandon Ash	Ash Motorsports	Ford	1:19.757	89.823
38	59	Klaus Graf	BAM Racing	Dodge	1:22.691	86.636
Provisionals
39	25	Brian Vickers	Hendrick Motorsports	Chevrolet	1:25.193	84.091
40	15	Michael Waltrip	Dale Earnhardt, Inc.	Chevrolet	—	—
41	10	Scott Riggs	MBV Motorsports	Chevrolet	1:34.444	75.854
42	32	Ricky Craven	PPI Motorsports	Chevrolet	—	—
43	98	Larry Gunselman	Mach 1 Motorsports	Ford	—	—
Failed to qualify or withdrew
44	89	Morgan Shepherd	Shepherd Racing Ventures	Dodge	—	—
WD	52	Carl Long	Rick Ware Racing	Dodge	—	—
Official qualifying results

== Race results ==
Fin	St	#	Driver	Team	Make	Laps	Led	Status	Pts	Winnings
1	1	24	Jeff Gordon	Hendrick Motorsports	Chevrolet	110	92	running	190	$388,103
2	11	42	Jamie McMurray	Chip Ganassi Racing	Dodge	110	0	running	170	$176,500
3	6	39	Scott Pruett	Chip Ganassi Racing	Dodge	110	1	running	170	$120,100
4	40	15	Michael Waltrip	Dale Earnhardt, Inc.	Chevrolet	110	0	running	160	$147,646
5	34	48	Jimmie Johnson	Hendrick Motorsports	Chevrolet	110	0	running	155	$112,915
6	19	36	Boris Said	MB2 Motorsports	Chevrolet	110	0	running	150	$79,165
7	29	41	Casey Mears	Chip Ganassi Racing	Dodge	110	5	running	151	$100,265
8	4	6	Mark Martin	Roush Racing	Ford	110	1	running	147	$89,315
9	13	99	Jeff Burton	Roush Racing	Ford	110	0	running	138	$108,482
10	16	38	Elliott Sadler	Robert Yates Racing	Ford	110	0	running	134	$109,943
11	20	8	Dale Earnhardt Jr.	Dale Earnhardt, Inc.	Chevrolet	110	9	running	135	$114,078
12	8	29	Kevin Harvick	Richard Childress Racing	Chevrolet	110	0	running	127	$105,838
13	7	16	Greg Biffle	Roush Racing	Ford	110	0	running	124	$76,475
14	22	12	Ryan Newman	Penske-Jasper Racing	Dodge	110	0	running	121	$106,742
15	17	20	Tony Stewart	Joe Gibbs Racing	Chevrolet	110	1	running	98	$107,653
16	42	32	Ricky Craven	PPI Motorsports	Chevrolet	110	0	running	115	$86,150
17	38	59	Klaus Graf	BAM Racing	Dodge	110	0	running	112	$58,925
18	23	88	Dale Jarrett	Robert Yates Racing	Ford	110	0	running	109	$93,742
19	28	30	Jim Inglebright	Richard Childress Racing	Chevrolet	110	0	running	106	$70,550
20	5	17	Matt Kenseth	Roush Racing	Ford	110	0	running	103	$111,603
21	26	40	Sterling Marlin	Chip Ganassi Racing	Dodge	110	0	running	100	$95,275
22	39	25	Brian Vickers	Hendrick Motorsports	Chevrolet	110	0	running	97	$71,550
23	18	49	Ken Schrader	BAM Racing	Dodge	110	0	running	94	$61,900
24	14	0	Ward Burton	Haas CNC Racing	Chevrolet	110	0	running	91	$62,630
25	25	22	Scott Wimmer	Bill Davis Racing	Dodge	110	0	running	88	$82,970
26	33	77	Brendan Gaughan	Penske-Jasper Racing	Dodge	110	0	running	85	$69,425
27	36	43	Jeff Green	Petty Enterprises	Dodge	110	0	running	82	$87,520
28	2	2	Rusty Wallace	Penske-Jasper Racing	Dodge	109	0	out of gas	79	$102,883
29	9	01	Joe Nemechek	MBV Motorsports	Chevrolet	109	0	running	76	$79,515
30	21	19	Jeremy Mayfield	Evernham Motorsports	Dodge	109	0	running	73	$77,849
31	30	9	Kasey Kahne	Evernham Motorsports	Dodge	109	0	running	70	$90,250
32	27	45	Kyle Petty	Petty Enterprises	Dodge	109	0	running	67	$57,800
33	10	18	Bobby Labonte	Joe Gibbs Racing	Chevrolet	104	0	running	64	$103,773
34	24	31	Robby Gordon	Richard Childress Racing	Chevrolet	100	0	running	61	$92,917
35	12	21	Ricky Rudd	Wood Brothers Racing	Ford	97	0	running	58	$83,751
36	3	97	Kurt Busch	Roush Racing	Ford	94	1	running	60	$78,160
37	43	98	Larry Gunselman	Mach 1 Motorsports	Ford	87	0	out of gas	52	$57,625
38	32	61	Austin Cameron	Bill McAnally Racing	Chevrolet	78	0	running	49	$57,590
39	31	50	P. J. Jones	Arnold Motorsports	Dodge	71	0	rear end	46	$57,550
40	15	5	Terry Labonte	Hendrick Motorsports	Chevrolet	67	0	engine	43	$84,250
41	37	02	Brandon Ash	Ash Motorsports	Ford	63	0	rear end	40	$57,450
42	41	10	Scott Riggs	MBV Motorsports	Chevrolet	51	0	crash	37	$82,597
43	35	72	Tom Hubert	Kirk Shelmerdine Racing	Ford	5	0	too slow	34	$57,615
Official race results

Previous race: 2004 DHL 400	NASCAR Nextel Cup Series; 2004 season	Next race: 2004 Pepsi 400
