= 2004 Auto Club 500 =

Race details
- Race 10 of 36 in the 2004 NASCAR Nextel Cup Series season
- The 2004 Auto Club 400 program cover.
- Date: May 2, 2004
- Official name: Auto Club 500
- Location: California Speedway, Fontana, California
- Course: Permanent racing facility
- Course length: 2.0 miles (3.23 km)
- Distance: 250 laps, 500 mi (804.672 km)
- Average speed: 137.268 miles per hour (220.911 km/h)
- Attendance: 120,000

Pole position
Driver	Kasey Kahne	Evernham Motorsports
- Time: 38.515

Most laps led
Driver	Jeff Gordon	Hendrick Motorsports
- Laps: 81

Winner
No. 24	Jeff Gordon	Hendrick Motorsports

Television in the United States
- Network: Fox Broadcasting Company
- Announcers: Mike Joy, Darrell Waltrip, Larry McReynolds

The 2004 Auto Club 500 was a NASCAR Nextel Cup Series stock car race held on May 2, 2004 at California Speedway in Fontana, California. Contested over 250 laps on the 2-mile (3.23 km) asphalt D-shaped oval, it was the tenth race of the 2004 NASCAR Nextel Cup Series season. Rookie Kasey Kahne of Evernham Motorsports won the pole, and Jeff Gordon of Hendrick Motorsports won the race.

== Background ==
The layout of California Speedway, the venue where the race was held.

The track, California Speedway, was a four-turn superspeedway that was 2 miles (3.2 km) long. The track's turns were banked from fourteen degrees, while the front stretch, the location of the finish line, was banked at eleven degrees. Unlike the front stretch, the backstraightaway was banked at three degrees.

Entry list
#	Driver	Team	Make
0	Ward Burton	Haas CNC Racing	Chevrolet
01	Joe Nemechek	MBV Motorsports	Chevrolet
02	Hermie Sadler	SCORE Motorsports	Chevrolet
2	Rusty Wallace	Penske-Jasper Racing	Dodge
4	Jimmy Spencer	Morgan–McClure Motorsports	Chevrolet
5	Terry Labonte	Hendrick Motorsports	Chevrolet
6	Mark Martin	Roush Racing	Ford
8	Dale Earnhardt, Jr.	Dale Earnhardt, Inc.	Chevrolet
9	Kasey Kahne	Evernham Motorsports	Dodge
09	Joe Ruttman	Phoenix Racing	Dodge
10	Scott Riggs	MBV Motorsports	Chevrolet
12	Ryan Newman	Penske-Jasper Racing	Dodge
15	Michael Waltrip	Dale Earnhardt, Inc.	Chevrolet
16	Greg Biffle	Roush Racing	Ford
17	Matt Kenseth	Roush Racing	Ford
18	Bobby Labonte	Joe Gibbs Racing	Chevrolet
19	Jeremy Mayfield	Evernham Motorsports	Dodge
20	Tony Stewart	Joe Gibbs Racing	Chevrolet
21	Ricky Rudd	Wood Brothers Racing	Ford
22	Scott Wimmer	Bill Davis Racing	Dodge
24	Jeff Gordon	Hendrick Motorsports	Chevrolet
25	Brian Vickers	Hendrick Motorsports	Chevrolet
29	Kevin Harvick	Richard Childress Racing	Chevrolet
30	Johnny Sauter	Richard Childress Racing	Chevrolet
31	Robby Gordon	Richard Childress Racing	Chevrolet
32	Ricky Craven	PPI Motorsports	Chevrolet
38	Elliott Sadler	Robert Yates Racing	Ford
40	Sterling Marlin	Chip Ganassi Racing	Dodge
41	Casey Mears	Chip Ganassi Racing	Dodge
42	Jamie McMurray	Chip Ganassi Racing	Dodge
43	Jeff Green	Petty Enterprises	Dodge
45	Kyle Petty	Petty Enterprises	Dodge
48	Jimmie Johnson	Hendrick Motorsports	Chevrolet
49	Ken Schrader	BAM Racing	Dodge
50	Derrike Cope	Arnold Motorsports	Dodge
72	Kirk Shelmerdine	Kirk Shelmerdine Racing	Ford
77	Brendan Gaughan	Penske-Jasper Racing	Dodge
88	Dale Jarrett	Robert Yates Racing	Ford
89	Morgan Shepherd	Shepherd Racing Ventures	Dodge
94	Stanton Barrett	W. W. Motorsports	Chevrolet
97	Kurt Busch	Roush Racing	Ford
98	Todd Bodine	Mach 1 Motorsports	Ford
99	Jeff Burton	Roush Racing	Ford

== Qualifying ==
Pos.	#	Driver	Team	Make	Time	Speed
1	9	Kasey Kahne	Evernham Motorsports	Dodge	38.515	186.940
2	01	Joe Nemechek	MBV Motorsports	Chevrolet	38.557	186.737
3	43	Jeff Green	Petty Enterprises	Dodge	38.644	186.316
4	10	Scott Riggs	MBV Motorsports	Chevrolet	38.679	186.148
5	77	Brendan Gaughan	Penske-Jasper Racing	Dodge	38.742	185.845
6	25	Brian Vickers	Hendrick Motorsports	Chevrolet	38.750	185.806
7	12	Ryan Newman	Penske-Jasper Racing	Dodge	38.760	185.759
8	40	Sterling Marlin	Chip Ganassi Racing	Dodge	38.763	185.744
9	2	Rusty Wallace	Penske-Jasper Racing	Dodge	38.806	185.538
10	8	Dale Earnhardt, Jr.	Dale Earnhardt, Inc.	Chevrolet	38.808	185.529
11	20	Tony Stewart	Joe Gibbs Racing	Chevrolet	38.886	185.157
12	42	Jamie McMurray	Chip Ganassi Racing	Dodge	38.912	185.033
13	41	Casey Mears	Chip Ganassi Racing	Dodge	38.954	184.883
14	38	Elliott Sadler	Robert Yates Racing	Ford	38.978	184.720
15	0	Ward Burton	Haas CNC Racing	Chevrolet	39.007	184.582
16	24	Jeff Gordon	Hendrick Motorsports	Chevrolet	39.028	184.483
17	15	Michael Waltrip	Dale Earnhardt, Inc.	Chevrolet	39.037	184.440
18	16	Greg Biffle	Roush Racing	Ford	39.075	184.261
19	48	Jimmie Johnson	Hendrick Motorsports	Chevrolet	39.083	184.223
20	19	Jeremy Mayfield	Evernham Motorsports	Dodge	39.089	184.195
21	97	Kurt Busch	Roush Racing	Ford	39.090	184.190
22	4	Jimmy Spencer	Morgan–McClure Motorsports	Chevrolet	39.116	184.068
23	31	Robby Gordon	Richard Childress Racing	Chevrolet	39.150	183.908
24	29	Kevin Harvick	Richard Childress Racing	Chevrolet	39.158	183.870
25	17	Matt Kenseth	Roush Racing	Ford	39.167	183.828
26	6	Mark Martin	Roush Racing	Ford	39.167	183.828
27	18	Bobby Labonte	Joe Gibbs Racing	Chevrolet	39.180	183.767
28	45	Kyle Petty	Petty Enterprises	Dodge	39.239	183.491
29	5	Terry Labonte	Hendrick Motorsports	Chevrolet	39.275	183.323
30	99	Jeff Burton	Roush Racing	Ford	39.310	183.159
31	88	Dale Jarrett	Robert Yates Racing	Ford	39.372	182.871
32	49	Ken Schrader	BAM Racing	Dodge	39.438	182.565
33	09	Johnny Benson Jr.*	Phoenix Racing	Dodge	39.499	182.283
34	32	Ricky Craven	PPI Motorsports	Chevrolet	39.505	182.255
35	21	Ricky Rudd	Wood Brothers Racing	Ford	39.573	181.942
36	50	Derrike Cope	Arnold Motorsports	Dodge	39.577	181.924
37	30	Johnny Sauter	Richard Childress Racing	Chevrolet	39.672	181.488
38	89	Morgan Shepherd	Shepherd Racing Ventures	Dodge	39.717	181.283
Provisionals
39	22	Scott Wimmer	Bill Davis Racing	Dodge	40.173	179.225
40	02	Hermie Sadler	SCORE Motorsports	Chevrolet	40.181	179.189
41	98	Todd Bodine	Mach 1 Motorsports	Ford	40.421	178.094
42	72	Kirk Shelmerdine	Kirk Shelmerdine Racing	Ford	41.273	174.448
43	94	Stanton Barrett	W. W. Motorsports	Chevrolet	41.108	175.148

*Driver would change to Joe Ruttman for the race.

== Results ==
Fin	St	No.	Driver	Team	Make	Laps	Laps Led	Status	Pts	Winnings
1	16	24	Jeff Gordon	Hendrick Motorsports	Chevrolet	250	81	running	190	$318,628
2	19	48	Jimmie Johnson	Hendrick Motorsports	Chevrolet	250	37	running	175	$194,675
3	7	12	Ryan Newman	Penske-Jasper Racing	Dodge	250	2	running	170	$191,267
4	25	17	Matt Kenseth	Roush Racing	Ford	250	11	running	165	$172,578
5	27	18	Bobby Labonte	Joe Gibbs Racing	Chevrolet	250	0	running	155	$150,233
6	5	77	Brendan Gaughan	Penske-Jasper Racing	Dodge	250	1	running	155	$106,125
7	29	5	Terry Labonte	Hendrick Motorsports	Chevrolet	250	0	running	146	$119,625
8	13	41	Casey Mears	Chip Ganassi Racing	Dodge	250	0	running	142	$108,375
9	24	29	Kevin Harvick	Richard Childress Racing	Chevrolet	250	3	running	143	$123,203
10	15	0	Ward Burton	Haas CNC Racing	Chevrolet	250	0	running	134	$88,350
11	26	6	Mark Martin	Roush Racing	Ford	250	0	running	130	$90,450
12	23	31	Robby Gordon	Richard Childress Racing	Chevrolet	250	0	running	127	$112,437
13	1	9	Kasey Kahne	Evernham Motorsports	Dodge	250	77	running	129	$127,250
14	20	19	Jeremy Mayfield	Evernham Motorsports	Dodge	249	1	running	126	$112,437
15	12	42	Jamie McMurray	Chip Ganassi Racing	Dodge	249	0	running	118	$87,725
16	11	20	Tony Stewart	Joe Gibbs Racing	Chevrolet	249	0	running	115	$120,603
17	35	21	Ricky Rudd	Wood Brothers Racing	Ford	249	0	running	112	$102,981
18	34	32	Ricky Craven	PPI Motorsports	Chevrolet	249	0	running	109	$97,225
19	10	8	Dale Earnhardt, Jr.	Dale Earnhardt, Inc.	Chevrolet	249	0	running	106	$119,203
20	32	49	Ken Schrader	BAM Racing	Dodge	249	1	running	108	$74,925
21	37	30	Johnny Sauter	Richard Childress Racing	Chevrolet	249	0	running	100	$84,175
22	14	38	Elliott Sadler	Robert Yates Racing	Ford	249	0	running	97	$109,058
23	21	97	Kurt Busch	Roush Racing	Ford	249	0	running	94	$90,550
24	31	88	Dale Jarrett	Robert Yates Racing	Ford	249	0	running	91	$103,217
25	4	10	Scott Riggs	MBV Motorsports	Chevrolet	249	0	running	88	$97,187
26	30	99	Jeff Burton	Roush Racing	Ford	249	0	running	85	$104,317
27	8	40	Sterling Marlin	Chip Ganassi Racing	Dodge	249	0	running	82	$103,200
28	2	01	Joe Nemechek	MBV Motorsports	Chevrolet	249	2	running	84	$88,100
29	6	25	Brian Vickers	Hendrick Motorsports	Chevrolet	248	1	running	81	$76,900
30	39	22	Scott Wimmer	Bill Davis Racing	Dodge	248	0	running	73	$83,039
31	36	50	Derrike Cope	Arnold Motorsports	Dodge	248	0	running	70	$65,975
32	17	15	Michael Waltrip	Dale Earnhardt, Inc.	Chevrolet	245	0	running	67	$101,831
33	18	16	Greg Biffle	Roush Racing	Ford	223	28	running	69	$74,500
34	41	98	Todd Bodine	Mach 1 Motorsports	Ford	209	1	engine	66	$65,375
35	9	2	Rusty Wallace	Penske-Jasper Racing	Dodge	193	0	running	58	$109,008
36	38	89	Morgan Shepherd	Shepherd Racing Ventures	Dodge	163	1	electrical	60	$65,025
37	3	43	Jeff Green	Petty Enterprises	Dodge	147	0	engine	52	$91,050
38	22	4	Jimmy Spencer	Morgan–McClure Motorsports	Chevrolet	127	3	engine	54	$64,550
39	28	45	Kyle Petty	Petty Enterprises	Dodge	40	0	engine	46	$64,430
40	43	94	Stanton Barrett	W. W. Motorsports	Chevrolet	20	0	crash	43	$64,280
41	40	02	Hermie Sadler	SCORE Motorsports	Chevrolet	20	0	transmission	40	$64,155
42	42	72	Kirk Shelmerdine	Kirk Shelmerdine Racing	Ford	5	0	handling	37	$64,050
43	33	09	Joe Ruttman	Phoenix Racing	Dodge	2	0	vibration	34	$64,161

Previous race: 2004 Aaron's 499	Nextel Cup Series; 2004 season	Next race: 2004 Chevy American Revolution 400
