= 2004 Golden Corral 500 =

Race details
- Race 4 of 36 in the 2004 NASCAR Nextel Cup Series
- The 2004 Golden Corral 500 program cover.
- Date: March 14, 2004
- Location: Atlanta Motor Speedway
- Course: Permanent racing facility
- Course length: 1.54 miles (2.478 km)
- Distance: 325 laps, 500.5 mi (805.477 km)
- Average speed: 158.679 mph (255.369 km/h)
- Attendance: 125,000

Pole position
Driver	Ryan Newman	Penske Racing
- Time: 28.640 secs

Most laps led
Driver	Tony Stewart	Joe Gibbs Racing
- Laps: 127

Winner
No. 8	Dale Earnhardt Jr.	Dale Earnhardt Inc.

Television in the United States
- Network: FOX
- Announcers: Mike Joy, Darrell Waltrip, Larry McReynolds

The 2004 Golden Corral 500 was the fourth race of the 2004 NASCAR Nextel Cup Series season, held at Atlanta Motor Speedway on March 14, 2004. The race was won by Dale Earnhardt Jr., who led 55 laps that day.

Ryan Newman of Penske Racing would win the pole, while Tony Stewart of Joe Gibbs Racing would lead the most laps with 127 laps led. 125,000 were in attendance for the race.

== Entry list ==
No.	Driver	Make	Team
0	Ward Burton	Chevrolet	Gene Haas
01	Joe Nemechek	Chevrolet	Nelson Bowers
02	Andy Belmont	Pontiac	Hermie Sadler
2	Rusty Wallace	Dodge	Roger Penske
4	Kevin Lepage	Chevrolet	Larry McClure
5	Terry Labonte	Chevrolet	Rick Hendrick
6	Mark Martin	Ford	Jack Roush
8	Dale Earnhardt Jr.	Chevrolet	Dale Earnhardt, Inc.
09	Joe Ruttman	Dodge	James Finch
9	Kasey Kahne	Dodge	Ray Evernham
10	Scott Riggs	Chevrolet	James Rocco
12	Ryan Newman	Dodge	Roger Penske
15	Michael Waltrip	Chevrolet	Dale Earnhardt, Inc.
16	Greg Biffle	Ford	Jack Roush
17	Matt Kenseth	Ford	Jack Roush
18	Bobby Labonte	Chevrolet	Joe Gibbs
19	Jeremy Mayfield	Dodge	Ray Evernham
20	Tony Stewart	Chevrolet	Joe Gibbs
21	Ricky Rudd	Ford	Wood Brothers
22	Scott Wimmer	Dodge	Bill Davis
23	Dave Blaney	Dodge	Bill Davis
24	Jeff Gordon	Chevrolet	Rick Hendrick
25	Brian Vickers	Chevrolet	Rick Hendrick
29	Kevin Harvick	Chevrolet	Richard Childress
30	Johnny Sauter	Chevrolet	Richard Childress
31	Robby Gordon	Chevrolet	Richard Childress
32	Ricky Craven	Chevrolet	Cal Wells
38	Elliott Sadler	Ford	Yates Racing
40	Sterling Marlin	Dodge	Chip Ganassi
41	Casey Mears	Dodge	Chip Ganassi
42	Jamie McMurray	Dodge	Chip Ganassi
43	Jeff Green	Dodge	Petty Enterprises
45	Kyle Petty	Dodge	Petty Enterprises
48	Jimmie Johnson	Chevrolet	Rick Hendrick
49	Ken Schrader	Dodge	Beth Ann Morgenthau
50	Derrike Cope	Dodge	Don Arnold
72	Kirk Shelmerdine	Ford	Kirk Shelmerdine
77	Brendan Gaughan	Dodge	Doug Bawel
80	Andy Hillenburg	Ford	Stan Hover
88	Dale Jarrett	Ford	Yates Racing
89	Morgan Shepherd	Dodge	Shepherd Racing Ventures
97	Kurt Busch	Ford	Jack Roush
98	Todd Bodine	Ford	William Edwards
99	Jeff Burton	Ford	Jack Roush

== Qualifying ==
Ryan Newman would win the pole with a 28.640. Kirk Shelmerdine would qualify for his first ever NASCAR Cup Series race.

Pos.	Car	Driver	Make	Time	Avg. (mph)
1	12	Ryan Newman	Dodge	28.640	193.57
2	25	Brian Vickers	Chevrolet	28.780	192.63
3	48	Jimmie Johnson	Chevrolet	28.818	192.38
4	24	Jeff Gordon	Chevrolet	28.820	192.37
5	38	Elliott Sadler	Ford	28.974	191.34
6	88	Dale Jarrett	Ford	28.976	191.33
7	8	Dale Earnhardt Jr.	Chevrolet	28.984	191.28
8	29	Kevin Harvick	Chevrolet	28.991	191.23
9	41	Casey Mears	Dodge	28.994	191.21
10	18	Bobby Labonte	Chevrolet	29.002	191.16
11	2	Rusty Wallace	Dodge	29.035	190.94
12	9	Kasey Kahne	Dodge	29.055	190.81
13	16	Greg Biffle	Ford	29.088	190.59
14	23	Dave Blaney	Dodge	29.102	190.50
15	15	Michael Waltrip	Chevrolet	29.107	190.47
16	19	Jeremy Mayfield	Dodge	29.107	190.47
17	10	Scott Riggs	Chevrolet	29.155	190.16
18	43	Jeff Green	Dodge	29.169	190.07
19	20	Tony Stewart	Chevrolet	29.176	190.02
20	97	Kurt Busch	Ford	29.194	189.90
21	0	Ward Burton	Chevrolet	29.202	189.85
22	42	Jamie McMurray	Dodge	29.220	189.73
23	31	Robby Gordon	Chevrolet	29.224	189.71
24	49	Ken Schrader	Dodge	29.229	189.68
25	77	Brendan Gaughan	Dodge	29.234	189.64
26	01	Joe Nemechek	Chevrolet	29.261	189.47
27	45	Kyle Petty	Dodge	29.371	188.76
28	6	Mark Martin	Ford	29.395	188.60
29	32	Ricky Craven	Chevrolet	29.422	188.43
30	17	Matt Kenseth	Ford	29.471	188.12
31	40	Sterling Marlin	Dodge	29.476	188.09
32	99	Jeff Burton	Ford	29.503	187.91
33	21	Ricky Rudd	Ford	29.520	187.81
34	50	Derrike Cope	Dodge	29.523	187.79
35	4	Kevin Lepage	Chevrolet	29.565	187.52
36	5	Terry Labonte	Chevrolet	29.649	186.99
37	22	Scott Wimmer	Dodge	29.661	186.91
38	98	Todd Bodine	Ford	29.755	186.32
39	30	Johnny Sauter	Chevrolet	29.779	186.17
40	09	Joe Ruttman	Dodge	29.835	185.82
41	02	Andy Belmont	Pontiac	32.115	172.63
42	72	Kirk Shelmerdine	Ford	31.074	178.41
43	80	Andy Hillenburg	Ford	31.745	174.64
Failed to qualify, withdrew, or driver changes:
44	89	Morgan Shepherd	Dodge	30.010	184.74

== Results ==
Pos	St	No.	Driver	Car	Laps	Money	Status	Led	Points
1	7	8	Dale Earnhardt, Jr.	Chevrolet	325	180078	running	55	185
2	16	19	Jeremy Mayfield	Dodge	325	137750	running	22	175
3	12	9	Kasey Kahne	Dodge	325	120125	running	0	165
4	3	48	Jimmie Johnson	Chevrolet	325	97400	running	0	160
5	1	12	Ryan Newman	Dodge	325	120467	running	43	160
6	30	17	Matt Kenseth	Ford	325	120728	running	0	150
7	19	20	Tony Stewart	Chevrolet	325	133778	running	127	156
8	13	16	Greg Biffle	Ford	325	74000	running	2	147
9	6	88	Dale Jarrett	Ford	325	96217	running	0	138
10	4	24	Jeff Gordon	Chevrolet	325	114228	running	38	139
11	14	23	Dave Blaney	Dodge	325	64275	running	0	130
12	20	97	Kurt Busch	Ford	325	78950	running	0	127
13	21	0	Ward Burton	Chevrolet	324	63775	running	0	124
14	28	6	Mark Martin	Ford	324	70550	running	0	121
15	26	01	Joe Nemechek	Chevrolet	324	86750	running	0	118
16	31	40	Sterling Marlin	Dodge	323	94800	running	0	115
17	23	31	Robby Gordon	Chevrolet	323	92987	running	1	117
18	10	18	Bobby Labonte	Chevrolet	323	102673	running	0	109
19	18	43	Jeff Green	Dodge	322	83615	running	0	106
20	32	99	Jeff Burton	Ford	322	96182	running	0	103
21	2	25	Brian Vickers	Chevrolet	322	69315	running	0	100
22	29	32	Ricky Craven	Chevrolet	322	81310	running	0	97
23	15	15	Michael Waltrip	Chevrolet	321	93591	running	0	94
24	36	5	Terry Labonte	Chevrolet	321	86560	running	0	91
25	17	10	Scott Riggs	Chevrolet	321	85072	running	0	88
26	24	49	Ken Schrader	Dodge	321	59235	running	0	85
27	37	22	Scott Wimmer	Dodge	321	77420	running	0	82
28	27	45	Kyle Petty	Dodge	321	67059	running	0	79
29	5	38	Elliott Sadler	Ford	320	87293	running	0	76
30	39	30	Johnny Sauter	Chevrolet	320	66335	running	0	73
31	33	21	Ricky Rudd	Ford	320	81316	running	0	70
32	8	29	Kevin Harvick	Chevrolet	318	90963	running	0	67
33	25	77	Brendan Gaughan	Dodge	314	63120	running	0	64
34	9	41	Casey Mears	Dodge	302	56000	engine	37	66
35	11	2	Rusty Wallace	Dodge	291	88873	running	0	58
36	35	4	Kevin Lepage	Chevrolet	287	55005	running	0	55
37	22	42	Jamie McMurray	Dodge	245	62970	engine	0	52
38	34	50	Derrike Cope	Dodge	186	54935	engine	0	49
39	41	02	Andy Belmont	Pontiac	80	54890	rear end	0	46
40	42	72	Kirk Shelmerdine	Ford	60	54840	handling	0	43
41	38	98	Todd Bodine	Ford	16	54800	engine	0	0
42	43	80	Andy Hillenburg	Ford	15	54760	engine	0	37
43	40	09	Joe Ruttman	Dodge	6	54071	vibration	0	34

Previous race: 2004 UAW-DaimlerChrysler 400	Nextel Cup Series; 2004 season	Next race: 2004 Carolina Dodge Dealers 400
