= 2004 Carolina Dodge Dealers 400 =

Race details
- Race 5 of 36 in the 2004 NASCAR Nextel Cup Series
- The 2004 Carolina Dodge Dealers 400 program cover, featuring the finish of 2003 Carolina Dodge Dealers 400 between Ricky Craven and Kurt Busch.
- Date: March 21, 2004
- Official name: Carolina Dodge Dealers 400
- Location: Darlington Raceway, Darlington, South Carolina
- Course: Permanent racing facility
- Course length: 1.366 miles (2.198 km)
- Distance: 293 laps, 400.238 mi (644.121 km)
- Average speed: 114.001 miles per hour (183.467 km/h)
- Attendance: 56,000

Pole position
Driver	Kasey Kahne	Evernham Motorsports
- Time: 28.638

Most laps led
Driver	Kurt Busch	Roush Racing
- Laps: 76

Winner
No. 48	Jimmie Johnson	Hendrick Motorsports

Television in the United States
- Network: FOX
- Announcers: Mike Joy, Larry McReynolds, Darrell Waltrip

The 2004 Carolina Dodge Dealers 400 was the fifth stock car race of the 2004 NASCAR Nextel Cup Series season and the 49th iteration of the event. The race was held before a crowd of 56,000 on March 21, 2004 at Darlington Raceway in Darlington, South Carolina. Jimmie Johnson of Hendrick Motorsports would win the race, leading 69 laps. Bobby Labonte of Joe Gibbs Racing and Ryan Newman of Penske-Jasper Racing would take 2nd and 3rd, respectively.

The race would be the last spring Darlington race until 2020 when the COVID-19 pandemic forced NASCAR to race at Darlington in the spring, as the Ferko lawsuit would move the second race that Darlington originally had, the Southern 500, to Texas Motor Speedway for a promised second date to Texas. The Carolina Dodge Dealers 400 would therefore move to the fall and be lengthened to 500 miles, making the race the new Southern 500. In 2020, the COVID-19 pandemic would make NASCAR race once again at Darlington in the spring, and in 2021 after rekindled fan interest, would announce that Darlington would once again get its spring 400-mile race, this time called the Goodyear 400.

== Background ==
#	Driver	Team	Make
0	Ward Burton	Haas CNC Racing	Chevrolet
01	Joe Nemechek	MBV Motorsports	Chevrolet
2	Rusty Wallace	Penske-Jasper Racing	Dodge
02	Andy Belmont	SCORE Motorsports	Pontiac
4	Kevin Lepage	Morgan–McClure Motorsports	Chevrolet
5	Terry Labonte	Hendrick Motorsports	Chevrolet
6	Mark Martin	Roush Racing	Ford
8	Dale Earnhardt, Jr.	Dale Earnhardt, Inc.	Chevrolet
9	Kasey Kahne	Evernham Motorsports	Dodge
09	Joe Ruttman	Phoenix Racing	Dodge
10	Scott Riggs	MBV Motorsports	Chevrolet
12	Ryan Newman	Penske-Jasper Racing	Dodge
15	Michael Waltrip	Dale Earnhardt, Inc.	Chevrolet
16	Greg Biffle	Roush Racing	Ford
17	Matt Kenseth	Roush Racing	Ford
18	Bobby Labonte	Joe Gibbs Racing	Chevrolet
19	Jeremy Mayfield	Evernham Motorsports	Dodge
20	Tony Stewart	Joe Gibbs Racing	Chevrolet
21	Ricky Rudd	Wood Brothers Racing	Ford
22	Scott Wimmer	Bill Davis Racing	Dodge
24	Jeff Gordon	Hendrick Motorsports	Chevrolet
25	Brian Vickers	Hendrick Motorsports	Chevrolet
29	Kevin Harvick	Richard Childress Racing	Chevrolet
30	Johnny Sauter	Richard Childress Racing	Chevrolet
31	Robby Gordon	Richard Childress Racing	Chevrolet
32	Ricky Craven	PPI Motorsports	Chevrolet
38	Elliott Sadler	Robert Yates Racing	Ford
40	Sterling Marlin	Chip Ganassi Racing	Dodge
41	Casey Mears	Chip Ganassi Racing	Dodge
42	Jamie McMurray	Chip Ganassi Racing	Dodge
43	Jeff Green	Petty Enterprises	Dodge
45	Kyle Petty	Petty Enterprises	Dodge
48	Jimmie Johnson	Hendrick Motorsports	Chevrolet
49	Ken Schrader	BAM Racing	Dodge
50	Derrike Cope	Arnold Motorsports	Dodge
72	Kirk Shelmerdine	Kirk Shelmerdine Racing	Ford
77	Brendan Gaughan	Penske-Jasper Racing	Dodge
80	Andy Hillenburg	Hover Motorsports	Ford
88	Dale Jarrett	Robert Yates Racing	Ford
89	Morgan Shepherd	Shepherd Racing Ventures	Dodge
94	Stanton Barrett	W. W. Motorsports	Chevrolet
97	Kurt Busch	Roush Racing	Ford
98	Todd Bodine	Mach 1 Motorsports	Ford
99	Jeff Burton	Roush Racing	Ford

== Qualifying ==
Qualifying took place on March 19, 2004. Kasey Kahne would win the pole with a 28.638 second lap, with an average speed of 171.716 miles per hour (276.350 km/h). Meanwhile, Michael Waltrip, driver of the #15 Dale Earnhardt, Inc. Chevrolet would not set a time, due to Waltrip scrubbing the wall in Turn 2. Instead of completing a lap, Waltrip would take a provisional and qualify 39th.

Stanton Barrett of W. W. Motorsports would be the only driver not to qualify due to the provisional system set in place by NASCAR at the time.

Pos.	#	Driver	Team	Make	Time	Speed
1	9	Kasey Kahne	Evernham Motorsports	Dodge	28.638	171.716
2	8	Dale Earnhardt, Jr.	Dale Earnhardt, Inc.	Chevrolet	28.732	171.154
3	16	Greg Biffle	Roush Racing	Ford	28.744	171.083
4	97	Kurt Busch	Roush Racing	Ford	28.254	171.023
5	50	Derrike Cope	Arnold Motorsports	Dodge	28.773	170.910
6	12	Ryan Newman	Penske-Jasper Racing	Dodge	28.793	170.792
7	2	Rusty Wallace	Penske-Jasper Racing	Dodge	28.868	170.348
8	20	Tony Stewart	Joe Gibbs Racing	Chevrolet	28.911	170.094
9	24	Jeff Gordon	Hendrick Motorsports	Chevrolet	28.913	170.083
10	38	Elliott Sadler	Robert Yates Racing	Ford	28.918	170.053
11	48	Jimmie Johnson	Hendrick Motorsports	Chevrolet	28.924	170.018
12	18	Bobby Labonte	Joe Gibbs Racing	Chevrolet	28.945	169.895
13	0	Ward Burton	Haas CNC Racing	Chevrolet	28.949	169.871
14	22	Scott Wimmer	Bill Davis Racing	Dodge	28.980	169.689
15	17	Matt Kenseth	Roush Racing	Ford	28.995	169.602
16	49	Ken Schrader	BAM Racing	Dodge	28.998	169.584
17	40	Sterling Marlin	Chip Ganassi Racing	Dodge	29.030	169.397
18	19	Jeremy Mayfield	Evernham Motorsports	Dodge	29.040	169.339
19	41	Casey Mears	Chip Ganassi Racing	Dodge	29.084	169.083
20	6	Mark Martin	Roush Racing	Ford	29.099	168.995
21	42	Jamie McMurray	Chip Ganassi Racing	Dodge	29.122	168.862
22	88	Dale Jarrett	Robert Yates Racing	Ford	29.128	168.827
23	29	Kevin Harvick	Richard Childress Racing	Chevrolet	29.151	168.694
24	30	Johnny Sauter	Richard Childress Racing	Chevrolet	29.156	168.665
25	21	Ricky Rudd	Wood Brothers Racing	Ford	29.181	168.521
26	5	Terry Labonte	Hendrick Motorsports	Chevrolet	29.232	168.227
27	10	Scott Riggs	MBV Motorsports	Chevrolet	29.235	168.209
28	25	Brian Vickers	Hendrick Motorsports	Chevrolet	29.236	168.204
29	31	Robby Gordon	Richard Childress Racing	Chevrolet	29.298	167.848
30	43	Jeff Green	Petty Enterprises	Dodge	29.305	167.808
31	4	Kevin Lepage	Morgan–McClure Motorsports	Chevrolet	29.306	167.802
32	45	Kyle Petty	Petty Enterprises	Dodge	29.342	167.596
33	99	Jeff Burton	Roush Racing	Ford	29.391	167.315
34	01	Joe Nemechek	MBV Motorsports	Chevrolet	29.412	167.197
35	98	Todd Bodine	Mach 1 Motorsports	Ford	29.455	166.953
36	32	Ricky Craven	PPI Motorsports	Chevrolet	29.465	166.896
37	77	Brendan Gaughan	Penske-Jasper Racing	Dodge	29.527	166.546
38	89	Morgan Shepherd	Shepherd Racing Ventures	Dodge	29.930	164.303
Provisionals
39	15	Michael Waltrip	Dale Earnhardt, Inc.	Chevrolet	0.000	0.000
40	09	Joe Ruttman	Phoenix Racing	Dodge	30.659	160.397
41	72	Kirk Shelmerdine	Kirk Shelmerdine Racing	Ford	32.197	152.735
42	02	Andy Belmont	SCORE Motorsports	Pontiac	31.428	156.472
43	80	Andy Hillenburg	Hover Motorsports	Ford	32.503	151.297
Failed to qualify
44	94	Stanton Barrett	W. W. Motorsports	Chevrolet	30.050	163.647

== Race ==
=== Pre-race ceremonies ===
Pre-race ceremonies would start with Darlington Raceway chaplain Harold King giving out the invocation. The contemporary Christian music group NewSong would sing the national anthem, with the 108th Squadron of the United States Navy Strike Force from Virginia Beach, Virginia performing the flyover. Five members of the Carolina Dodge Dealers Association would give the starting command.

== Race results ==
Pos.	St	#	Driver	Team	Make	Laps	Led	Status	Pts	Winnings
1	11	48	Jimmie Johnson	Hendrick Motorsports	Chevrolet	293	69	running	185	$151,150
2	12	18	Bobby Labonte	Joe Gibbs Racing	Chevrolet	293	18	running	175	$136,183
3	6	12	Ryan Newman	Penske-Jasper Racing	Dodge	293	39	running	170	$120,912
4	29	31	Robby Gordon	Richard Childress Racing	Chevrolet	293	0	running	160	$119,117
5	10	38	Elliott Sadler	Robert Yates Racing	Ford	293	0	running	155	$120,233
6	4	97	Kurt Busch	Roush Racing	Ford	293	76	running	160	$86,275
7	20	6	Mark Martin	Roush Racing	Ford	293	0	running	146	$72,345
8	23	29	Kevin Harvick	Richard Childress Racing	Chevrolet	293	0	running	142	$98,743
9	18	19	Jeremy Mayfield	Evernham Motorsports	Dodge	293	0	running	138	$88,635
10	2	8	Dale Earnhardt, Jr.	Dale Earnhardt, Inc.	Chevrolet	293	18	running	139	$106,983
11	33	99	Jeff Burton	Roush Racing	Ford	293	0	running	130	$95,092
12	3	16	Greg Biffle	Roush Racing	Ford	293	3	running	132	$67,945
13	1	9	Kasey Kahne	Evernham Motorsports	Dodge	293	24	running	129	$103,590
14	17	40	Sterling Marlin	Chip Ganassi Racing	Dodge	293	1	running	126	$92,110
15	19	41	Casey Mears	Chip Ganassi Racing	Dodge	293	0	running	118	$75,130
16	14	22	Scott Wimmer	Bill Davis Racing	Dodge	293	0	running	115	$79,285
17	8	20	Tony Stewart	Joe Gibbs Racing	Chevrolet	293	1	running	117	$101,118
18	13	0	Ward Burton	Haas CNC Racing	Chevrolet	293	0	running	109	$57,720
19	26	5	Terry Labonte	Hendrick Motorsports	Chevrolet	293	0	running	106	$84,140
20	34	01	Joe Nemechek	MBV Motorsports	Chevrolet	292	0	running	103	$77,470
21	21	42	Jamie McMurray	Chip Ganassi Racing	Dodge	292	40	running	105	$74,705
22	16	49	Ken Schrader	BAM Racing	Dodge	292	0	running	97	$56,390
23	28	25	Brian Vickers	Hendrick Motorsports	Chevrolet	292	0	running	94	$65,000
24	30	43	Jeff Green	Petty Enterprises	Dodge	292	0	running	91	$79,010
25	5	50	Derrike Cope	Arnold Motorsports	Dodge	292	0	running	88	$52,920
26	24	30	Johnny Sauter	Richard Childress Racing	Chevrolet	292	0	running	85	$63,310
27	37	77	Brendan Gaughan	Penske-Jasper Racing	Dodge	291	0	running	82	$63,110
28	31	4	Kevin Lepage	Morgan–McClure Motorsports	Chevrolet	291	0	running	79	$62,844
29	7	2	Rusty Wallace	Penske-Jasper Racing	Dodge	290	0	running	76	$85,588
30	27	10	Scott Riggs	MBV Motorsports	Chevrolet	290	0	running	73	$77,372
31	15	17	Matt Kenseth	Roush Racing	Ford	289	0	running	70	$102,358
32	22	88	Dale Jarrett	Robert Yates Racing	Ford	279	0	running	67	$82,442
33	25	21	Ricky Rudd	Wood Brothers Racing	Ford	275	0	running	64	$77,481
34	32	45	Kyle Petty	Petty Enterprises	Dodge	245	0	engine	61	$51,365
35	39	15	Michael Waltrip	Dale Earnhardt, Inc.	Chevrolet	181	0	crash	58	$88,291
36	36	32	Ricky Craven	PPI Motorsports	Chevrolet	159	0	crash	55	$59,265
37	42	02	Andy Belmont	SCORE Motorsports	Pontiac	69	0	brakes	52	$51,225
38	38	89	Morgan Shepherd	Shepherd Racing Ventures	Dodge	65	2	brakes	54	$51,175
39	41	72	Kirk Shelmerdine	Kirk Shelmerdine Racing	Ford	49	0	too slow	46	$51,115
40	35	98	Todd Bodine	Mach 1 Motorsports	Ford	33	2	rear end	48	$51,015
41	9	24	Jeff Gordon	Hendrick Motorsports	Chevrolet	27	0	crash	40	$98,328
42	43	80	Andy Hillenburg	Hover Motorsports	Ford	26	0	crash	37	$50,890
43	40	09	Joe Ruttman	Phoenix Racing	Dodge	22	0	vibration	34	$50,214

Previous race: 2004 Golden Corral 500	Nextel Cup Series; 2004 season	Next race: 2004 Food City 500
