= 2004 Chevy American Revolution 400 =

Race details
- Race 11 of 36 in the 2004 NASCAR Nextel Cup Series
- The 2004 Chevy American Revolution 400 program cover.
- Date: May 15, 2004
- Official name: 50th Annual Chevy American Revolution 400
- Location: Richmond, Virginia, Richmond International Raceway
- Course: Permanent racing facility
- Course length: 0.75 miles (1.21 km)
- Distance: 400 laps, 300 mi (482.803 km)
- Scheduled distance: 400 laps, 300 mi (482.803 km)
- Average speed: 98.253 miles per hour (158.123 km/h)
- Attendance: 115,000

Pole position
| Driver | Brian Vickers | Hendrick Motorsports |
- Time: 20.772

Most laps led
| Driver | Dale Earnhardt Jr. | Dale Earnhardt, Inc. |
- Laps: 115

Winner
| No. 8 | Dale Earnhardt Jr. | Dale Earnhardt, Inc. |

Television in the United States
- Network: FX
- Announcers: Mike Joy, Larry McReynolds, Darrell Waltrip

Radio in the United States
- Radio: Motor Racing Network

The 2004 Chevy American Revolution 400 was the 11th stock car race of the 2004 NASCAR Nextel Cup Series season and the 50th iteration of the event. The race was held on Saturday, May 15, 2004, before a crowd of 115,000 in Richmond, Virginia, at Richmond International Raceway, a 0.75 miles (1.21 km) D-shaped oval. The race took the scheduled 400 laps to complete. At race's end, Dale Earnhardt, Inc. driver Dale Earnhardt Jr. would cruise on the final restart to win his 12th career NASCAR Nextel Cup Series win and his third win of the season. To fill out the podium, Jimmie Johnson of Hendrick Motorsports finished 2nd, and Bobby Labonte of Joe Gibbs Racing finished 3rd.

== Background ==
The layout of Richmond International Raceway, the venue where the race was at.

Richmond International Raceway (RIR) is a 3/4-mile (1.2 km), D-shaped, asphalt race track located just outside Richmond, Virginia in Henrico County. It hosts the NASCAR Cup Series, Xfinity Series and the NASCAR Camping World Truck Series. Known as "America's premier short track", it formerly hosted an IndyCar Series race and two USAC sprint car races.

=== Entry list ===
| # | Driver | Team | Make |
|---|---|---|---|
| 0 | Ward Burton | Haas CNC Racing | Chevrolet |
| 01 | Joe Nemechek | MBV Motorsports | Chevrolet |
| 2 | Rusty Wallace | Penske-Jasper Racing | Dodge |
| 02 | Hermie Sadler | SCORE Motorsports | Chevrolet |
| 4 | Jimmy Spencer | Morgan–McClure Motorsports | Chevrolet |
| 5 | Terry Labonte | Hendrick Motorsports | Chevrolet |
| 6 | Mark Martin | Roush Racing | Ford |
| 7 | Dave Blaney | Ultra Motorsports | Dodge |
| 8 | Dale Earnhardt, Jr. | Dale Earnhardt, Inc. | Chevrolet |
| 9 | Kasey Kahne | Evernham Motorsports | Dodge |
| 09 | Bobby Hamilton Jr. | Phoenix Racing | Dodge |
| 10 | Scott Riggs | MBV Motorsports | Chevrolet |
| 12 | Ryan Newman | Penske-Jasper Racing | Dodge |
| 15 | Michael Waltrip | Dale Earnhardt, Inc. | Chevrolet |
| 16 | Greg Biffle | Roush Racing | Ford |
| 17 | Matt Kenseth | Roush Racing | Ford |
| 18 | Bobby Labonte | Joe Gibbs Racing | Chevrolet |
| 19 | Jeremy Mayfield | Evernham Motorsports | Dodge |
| 20 | Tony Stewart | Joe Gibbs Racing | Chevrolet |
| 21 | Ricky Rudd | Wood Brothers Racing | Ford |
| 22 | Scott Wimmer | Bill Davis Racing | Dodge |
| 24 | Jeff Gordon | Hendrick Motorsports | Chevrolet |
| 25 | Brian Vickers | Hendrick Motorsports | Chevrolet |
| 29 | Kevin Harvick | Richard Childress Racing | Chevrolet |
| 30 | Johnny Sauter | Richard Childress Racing | Chevrolet |
| 31 | Robby Gordon | Richard Childress Racing | Chevrolet |
| 32 | Ricky Craven | PPI Motorsports | Chevrolet |
| 38 | Elliott Sadler | Robert Yates Racing | Ford |
| 40 | Sterling Marlin | Chip Ganassi Racing | Dodge |
| 41 | Casey Mears | Chip Ganassi Racing | Dodge |
| 42 | Jamie McMurray | Chip Ganassi Racing | Dodge |
| 43 | Jeff Green | Petty Enterprises | Dodge |
| 45 | Kyle Petty | Petty Enterprises | Dodge |
| 48 | Jimmie Johnson | Hendrick Motorsports | Chevrolet |
| 49 | Ken Schrader | BAM Racing | Dodge |
| 50 | Derrike Cope | Arnold Motorsports | Dodge |
| 72 | Kirk Shelmerdine | Kirk Shelmerdine Racing | Ford |
| 77 | Brendan Gaughan | Penske-Jasper Racing | Dodge |
| 80 | Randy LaJoie | Hover Motorsports | Ford |
| 88 | Dale Jarrett | Robert Yates Racing | Ford |
| 89 | Morgan Shepherd | Shepherd Racing Ventures | Dodge |
| 94 | Stanton Barrett | W. W. Motorsports | Chevrolet |
| 97 | Kurt Busch | Roush Racing | Ford |
| 98 | Todd Bodine | Mach 1 Motorsports | Ford |
| 99 | Jeff Burton | Roush Racing | Ford |
Official entry list

== Practice ==
=== First practice ===
The first practice session was held on Friday, May 14, at 11:20 AM EST, and would last for two hours. Ryan Newman of Penske-Jasper Racing would set the fastest time in the session, with a lap of 20.367 and an average speed of 132.567 miles per hour (213.346 km/h).

| Pos. | # | Driver | Team | Make | Time | Speed |
|---|---|---|---|---|---|---|
| 1 | 12 | Ryan Newman | Penske-Jasper Racing | Dodge | 20.367 | 132.567 |
| 2 | 9 | Kasey Kahne | Evernham Motorsports | Dodge | 20.492 | 131.759 |
| 3 | 48 | Jimmie Johnson | Hendrick Motorsports | Chevrolet | 20.542 | 131.438 |
Full first practice results

=== Second and final practice ===
The second and final practice session, sometimes referred to as Happy Hour, was held on Friday, May 14, at 6:00 PM EST, and would last for one hour and 15 minutes. Ryan Newman of Penske-Jasper Racing would set the fastest time in the session, with a lap of 20.989 and an average speed of 128.639 miles per hour (207.024 km/h).

| Pos. | # | Driver | Team | Make | Time | Speed |
|---|---|---|---|---|---|---|
| 1 | 12 | Ryan Newman | Penske-Jasper Racing | Dodge | 20.989 | 128.639 |
| 2 | 9 | Kasey Kahne | Evernham Motorsports | Dodge | 21.003 | 128.553 |
| 3 | 97 | Kurt Busch | Roush Racing | Ford | 21.141 | 127.714 |
Full second practice results

== Qualifying ==
Qualifying was held on Friday, May 14, at 3:10 PM EST. Each driver would have two laps to set a fastest time; the fastest of the two would count as their official qualifying lap. Positions 1-38 would be decided on time, while positions 39-43 would be based on provisionals. Four spots are awarded by the use of provisionals based on owner's points. The fifth is awarded to a past champion who has not otherwise qualified for the race. If no past champ needs the provisional, the next team in the owner points will be awarded a provisional.

Brian Vickers of Hendrick Motorsports would win the pole, setting a time of 20.772 and an average speed of 129.983 miles per hour (209.187 km/h). At the time, Vickers was the youngest ever pole-sitter.

Two drivers would crash during qualifying. First, Ricky Craven would slam the wall on his second lap, damaging the rear end of his car. Then, Kasey Kahne would crash on his first lap. While both had qualified, they would be forced to start at the rear for the race for switching to a backup car. In addition, the #9 team was forced to use a provisional.

Two drivers would fail to qualify: Stanton Barrett and Kirk Shelmerdine.

=== Full qualifying results ===
| Pos. | # | Driver | Team | Make | Time | Speed |
|---|---|---|---|---|---|---|
| 1 | 25 | Brian Vickers | Hendrick Motorsports | Chevrolet | 20.772 | 129.983 |
| 2 | 12 | Ryan Newman | Penske-Jasper Racing | Dodge | 20.774 | 129.970 |
| 3 | 43 | Jeff Green | Petty Enterprises | Dodge | 20.821 | 129.677 |
| 4 | 8 | Dale Earnhardt Jr. | Dale Earnhardt, Inc. | Chevrolet | 20.827 | 129.639 |
| 5 | 48 | Jimmie Johnson | Hendrick Motorsports | Chevrolet | 20.839 | 129.565 |
| 6 | 31 | Robby Gordon | Richard Childress Racing | Chevrolet | 20.875 | 129.341 |
| 7 | 2 | Rusty Wallace | Penske-Jasper Racing | Dodge | 20.894 | 129.224 |
| 8 | 01 | Joe Nemechek | MBV Motorsports | Chevrolet | 20.897 | 129.205 |
| 9 | 41 | Casey Mears | Chip Ganassi Racing | Dodge | 20.901 | 129.180 |
| 10 | 16 | Greg Biffle | Roush Racing | Ford | 20.916 | 129.088 |
| 11 | 19 | Jeremy Mayfield | Evernham Motorsports | Dodge | 20.919 | 129.069 |
| 12 | 6 | Mark Martin | Roush Racing | Ford | 20.929 | 129.008 |
| 13 | 24 | Jeff Gordon | Hendrick Motorsports | Chevrolet | 20.952 | 128.866 |
| 14 | 38 | Elliott Sadler | Robert Yates Racing | Ford | 20.967 | 128.774 |
| 15 | 0 | Ward Burton | Haas CNC Racing | Chevrolet | 21.002 | 128.559 |
| 16 | 10 | Scott Riggs | MBV Motorsports | Chevrolet | 21.009 | 128.516 |
| 17 | 99 | Jeff Burton | Roush Racing | Ford | 21.013 | 128.492 |
| 18 | 15 | Michael Waltrip | Dale Earnhardt, Inc. | Chevrolet | 21.015 | 128.480 |
| 19 | 5 | Terry Labonte | Hendrick Motorsports | Chevrolet | 21.020 | 128.449 |
| 20 | 29 | Kevin Harvick | Richard Childress Racing | Chevrolet | 21.023 | 128.431 |
| 21 | 32 | Ricky Craven | PPI Motorsports | Chevrolet | 21.035 | 128.357 |
| 22 | 45 | Kyle Petty | Petty Enterprises | Dodge | 21.047 | 128.284 |
| 23 | 97 | Kurt Busch | Roush Racing | Ford | 21.058 | 128.217 |
| 24 | 7 | Dave Blaney | Ultra Motorsports | Dodge | 21.078 | 128.096 |
| 25 | 22 | Scott Wimmer | Bill Davis Racing | Dodge | 21.086 | 128.047 |
| 26 | 09 | Bobby Hamilton Jr. | Phoenix Racing | Dodge | 21.090 | 128.023 |
| 27 | 18 | Bobby Labonte | Joe Gibbs Racing | Chevrolet | 21.112 | 127.889 |
| 28 | 20 | Tony Stewart | Joe Gibbs Racing | Chevrolet | 21.113 | 127.883 |
| 29 | 17 | Matt Kenseth | Roush Racing | Ford | 21.141 | 127.714 |
| 30 | 21 | Ricky Rudd | Wood Brothers Racing | Ford | 21.217 | 127.256 |
| 31 | 88 | Dale Jarrett | Robert Yates Racing | Ford | 21.271 | 126.933 |
| 32 | 40 | Sterling Marlin | Chip Ganassi Racing | Dodge | 21.284 | 126.856 |
| 33 | 02 | Hermie Sadler | SCORE Motorsports | Chevrolet | 21.289 | 126.826 |
| 34 | 49 | Ken Schrader | BAM Racing | Dodge | 21.360 | 126.405 |
| 35 | 30 | Johnny Sauter | Richard Childress Racing | Chevrolet | 21.390 | 126.227 |
| 36 | 98 | Todd Bodine | Mach 1 Motorsports | Ford | 21.397 | 126.186 |
| 37 | 42 | Jamie McMurray | Chip Ganassi Racing | Dodge | 21.416 | 126.074 |
| 38 | 4 | Jimmy Spencer | Morgan–McClure Motorsports | Chevrolet | 21.630 | 124.827 |
Provisionals
| 39 | 9 | Kasey Kahne | Evernham Motorsports | Dodge | 23.135 | 116.706 |
| 40 | 77 | Brendan Gaughan | Penske-Jasper Racing | Dodge | 21.941 | 123.057 |
| 41 | 50 | Derrike Cope | Arnold Motorsports | Dodge | 21.674 | 124.573 |
| 42 | 89 | Morgan Shepherd | Shepherd Racing Ventures | Dodge | 21.762 | 124.070 |
| 43 | 80 | Randy LaJoie | Hover Motorsports | Ford | 22.287 | 121.147 |
Failed to qualify
| 44 | 94 | Stanton Barrett | W. W. Motorsports | Chevrolet | 21.692 | 124.470 |
| 45 | 72 | Kirk Shelmerdine | Kirk Shelmerdine Racing | Ford | 22.457 | 120.230 |
Official qualifying results

== Race results ==
| Fin | St | # | Driver | Team | Make | Laps | Led | Status | Pts | Winnings |
|---|---|---|---|---|---|---|---|---|---|---|
| 1 | 4 | 8 | Dale Earnhardt Jr. | Dale Earnhardt, Inc. | Chevrolet | 400 | 115 | running | 190 | $285,053 |
| 2 | 5 | 48 | Jimmie Johnson | Hendrick Motorsports | Chevrolet | 400 | 91 | running | 175 | $135,350 |
| 3 | 27 | 18 | Bobby Labonte | Joe Gibbs Racing | Chevrolet | 400 | 0 | running | 165 | $142,333 |
| 4 | 28 | 20 | Tony Stewart | Joe Gibbs Racing | Chevrolet | 400 | 59 | running | 165 | $127,478 |
| 5 | 29 | 17 | Matt Kenseth | Roush Racing | Ford | 400 | 4 | running | 160 | $122,303 |
| 6 | 13 | 24 | Jeff Gordon | Hendrick Motorsports | Chevrolet | 400 | 2 | running | 155 | $113,278 |
| 7 | 12 | 6 | Mark Martin | Roush Racing | Ford | 400 | 0 | running | 146 | $76,825 |
| 8 | 1 | 25 | Brian Vickers | Hendrick Motorsports | Chevrolet | 400 | 32 | running | 147 | $81,775 |
| 9 | 2 | 12 | Ryan Newman | Penske-Jasper Racing | Dodge | 400 | 9 | running | 143 | $108,642 |
| 10 | 18 | 15 | Michael Waltrip | Dale Earnhardt, Inc. | Chevrolet | 400 | 56 | running | 139 | $110,581 |
| 11 | 30 | 21 | Ricky Rudd | Wood Brothers Racing | Ford | 400 | 2 | running | 135 | $91,831 |
| 12 | 14 | 38 | Elliott Sadler | Robert Yates Racing | Ford | 399 | 0 | running | 127 | $99,393 |
| 13 | 31 | 88 | Dale Jarrett | Robert Yates Racing | Ford | 399 | 1 | running | 129 | $96,067 |
| 14 | 17 | 99 | Jeff Burton | Roush Racing | Ford | 399 | 0 | running | 121 | $97,342 |
| 15 | 32 | 40 | Sterling Marlin | Chip Ganassi Racing | Dodge | 399 | 0 | running | 118 | $99,255 |
| 16 | 7 | 2 | Rusty Wallace | Penske-Jasper Racing | Dodge | 399 | 0 | running | 115 | $102,983 |
| 17 | 26 | 09 | Bobby Hamilton Jr. | Phoenix Racing | Dodge | 399 | 0 | running | 112 | $58,470 |
| 18 | 19 | 5 | Terry Labonte | Hendrick Motorsports | Chevrolet | 398 | 0 | running | 109 | $89,150 |
| 19 | 35 | 30 | Johnny Sauter | Richard Childress Racing | Chevrolet | 398 | 0 | running | 106 | $70,175 |
| 20 | 15 | 0 | Ward Burton | Haas CNC Racing | Chevrolet | 398 | 0 | running | 103 | $63,475 |
| 21 | 10 | 16 | Greg Biffle | Roush Racing | Ford | 398 | 0 | running | 100 | $69,100 |
| 22 | 11 | 19 | Jeremy Mayfield | Evernham Motorsports | Dodge | 397 | 23 | running | 102 | $85,875 |
| 23 | 34 | 49 | Ken Schrader | BAM Racing | Dodge | 397 | 0 | running | 94 | $60,575 |
| 24 | 6 | 31 | Robby Gordon | Richard Childress Racing | Chevrolet | 397 | 0 | running | 91 | $93,012 |
| 25 | 20 | 29 | Kevin Harvick | Richard Childress Racing | Chevrolet | 397 | 0 | running | 88 | $96,328 |
| 26 | 21 | 32 | Ricky Craven | PPI Motorsports | Chevrolet | 396 | 0 | running | 85 | $82,925 |
| 27 | 22 | 45 | Kyle Petty | Petty Enterprises | Dodge | 395 | 0 | running | 82 | $72,700 |
| 28 | 39 | 9 | Kasey Kahne | Evernham Motorsports | Dodge | 394 | 0 | running | 79 | $89,350 |
| 29 | 41 | 50 | Derrike Cope | Arnold Motorsports | Dodge | 392 | 0 | running | 76 | $56,250 |
| 30 | 25 | 22 | Scott Wimmer | Bill Davis Racing | Dodge | 392 | 0 | running | 73 | $78,075 |
| 31 | 23 | 97 | Kurt Busch | Roush Racing | Ford | 386 | 6 | running | 75 | $76,025 |
| 32 | 9 | 41 | Casey Mears | Chip Ganassi Racing | Dodge | 380 | 0 | running | 67 | $67,364 |
| 33 | 36 | 98 | Todd Bodine | Mach 1 Motorsports | Ford | 373 | 0 | running | 64 | $56,850 |
| 34 | 40 | 77 | Brendan Gaughan | Penske-Jasper Racing | Dodge | 362 | 0 | running | 61 | $66,375 |
| 35 | 16 | 10 | Scott Riggs | MBV Motorsports | Chevrolet | 341 | 0 | engine | 58 | $81,012 |
| 36 | 8 | 01 | Joe Nemechek | MBV Motorsports | Chevrolet | 265 | 0 | crash | 55 | $63,775 |
| 37 | 3 | 43 | Jeff Green | Petty Enterprises | Dodge | 239 | 0 | crash | 52 | $81,975 |
| 38 | 37 | 42 | Jamie McMurray | Chip Ganassi Racing | Dodge | 202 | 0 | crash | 49 | $63,675 |
| 39 | 42 | 89 | Morgan Shepherd | Shepherd Racing Ventures | Dodge | 131 | 0 | engine | 46 | $55,620 |
| 40 | 24 | 7 | Dave Blaney | Ultra Motorsports | Dodge | 123 | 0 | vibration | 43 | $55,555 |
| 41 | 38 | 4 | Jimmy Spencer | Morgan–McClure Motorsports | Chevrolet | 118 | 0 | crash | 40 | $55,500 |
| 42 | 33 | 02 | Hermie Sadler | SCORE Motorsports | Chevrolet | 114 | 0 | engine | 37 | $55,450 |
| 43 | 43 | 80 | Randy LaJoie | Hover Motorsports | Ford | 36 | 0 | vibration | 34 | $55,651 |
Failed to qualify
| 44 | | 94 | Stanton Barrett | W. W. Motorsports | Chevrolet | | | | | |
| 45 | | 72 | Kirk Shelmerdine | Kirk Shelmerdine Racing | Ford | | | | | |
Official race results

| Previous race: 2004 Auto Club 500 | NASCAR Nextel Cup Series; 2004 season | Next race: 2004 Coca-Cola 600 |
