= 2004 DHL 400 =

Race details
- Race 15 of 36 in the 2004 NASCAR Nextel Cup Series
- The 2004 DHL 400 program cover.
- Date: June 20, 2004
- Official name: 36th Annual DHL 400
- Location: Brooklyn, Michigan, Michigan International Speedway
- Course: Permanent racing facility
- Course length: 2 miles (3.2 km)
- Distance: 200 laps, 400 mi (643.737 km)
- Scheduled distance: 200 laps, 400 mi (643.737 km)
- Average speed: 139.292 miles per hour (224.169 km/h)
- Attendance: 160,000

Pole position
Driver	Jeff Gordon	Hendrick Motorsports
- Time: 37.723

Most laps led
Driver	Jeff Gordon	Hendrick Motorsports
- Laps: 81

Winner
No. 12	Ryan Newman	Penske-Jasper Racing

Television in the United States
- Network: FOX
- Announcers: Mike Joy, Larry McReynolds, Darrell Waltrip

Radio in the United States
- Radio: Motor Racing Network

The 2004 DHL 400 was the 15th stock car race of the 2004 NASCAR Nextel Cup Series season and the 36th iteration of the event. The race was held on Sunday, June 20, 2004, before a crowd of 160,000 in Brooklyn, Michigan, at Michigan International Speedway, a two-mile (3.2 km) moderate-banked D-shaped speedway. The race took the scheduled 200 laps to complete. At race's end, the race would end under caution after P. J. Jones crashed in Turn 2 in the last lap, leaving Ryan Newman of Penske-Jasper Racing to collect his 10th career NASCAR Nextel Cup Series win and his first of the season. To fill out the podium, Kasey Kahne of Evernham Motorsports finished 2nd and Dale Jarrett of Robert Yates Racing finished 3rd.

== Background ==
The race was held at Michigan International Speedway, a two-mile (3.2 km) moderate-banked D-shaped speedway located in Brooklyn, Michigan. The track is used primarily for NASCAR events. It is known as a "sister track" to Texas World Speedway as MIS's oval design was a direct basis of TWS, with moderate modifications to the banking in the corners, and was used as the basis of Auto Club Speedway. The track is owned by International Speedway Corporation. Michigan International Speedway is recognized as one of motorsports' premier facilities because of its wide racing surface and high banking (by open-wheel standards; the 18-degree banking is modest by stock car standards).

=== Entry list ===
#	Driver	Team	Make
0	Ward Burton	Haas CNC Racing	Chevrolet
00	Carl Long	McGlynn Racing	Dodge
01	Joe Nemechek	MBV Motorsports	Chevrolet
2	Rusty Wallace	Penske-Jasper Racing	Dodge
02	Derrike Cope	SCORE Motorsports	Chevrolet
4	Jimmy Spencer	Morgan–McClure Motorsports	Chevrolet
5	Terry Labonte	Hendrick Motorsports	Chevrolet
6	Mark Martin	Roush Racing	Ford
8	Dale Earnhardt, Jr.	Dale Earnhardt, Inc.	Chevrolet
9	Kasey Kahne	Evernham Motorsports	Dodge
10	Scott Riggs	MBV Motorsports	Chevrolet
12	Ryan Newman	Penske-Jasper Racing	Dodge
15	Michael Waltrip	Dale Earnhardt, Inc.	Chevrolet
16	Greg Biffle	Roush Racing	Ford
17	Matt Kenseth	Roush Racing	Ford
18	Bobby Labonte	Joe Gibbs Racing	Chevrolet
19	Jeremy Mayfield	Evernham Motorsports	Dodge
20	Tony Stewart	Joe Gibbs Racing	Chevrolet
21	Ricky Rudd	Wood Brothers Racing	Ford
22	Scott Wimmer	Bill Davis Racing	Dodge
23	Dave Blaney*	Bill Davis Racing	Dodge
24	Jeff Gordon	Hendrick Motorsports	Chevrolet
25	Brian Vickers	Hendrick Motorsports	Chevrolet
29	Kevin Harvick	Richard Childress Racing	Chevrolet
30	Johnny Sauter*	Richard Childress Racing	Chevrolet
31	Robby Gordon	Richard Childress Racing	Chevrolet
32	Ricky Craven	PPI Motorsports	Chevrolet
33	Kerry Earnhardt	Richard Childress Racing	Chevrolet
37	Todd Bodine	R&J Racing	Dodge
38	Elliott Sadler	Robert Yates Racing	Ford
40	Sterling Marlin	Chip Ganassi Racing	Dodge
41	Casey Mears	Chip Ganassi Racing	Dodge
42	Jamie McMurray	Chip Ganassi Racing	Dodge
43	Jeff Green	Petty Enterprises	Dodge
45	Kyle Petty	Petty Enterprises	Dodge
48	Jimmie Johnson	Hendrick Motorsports	Chevrolet
49	Ken Schrader	BAM Racing	Dodge
50	P. J. Jones	Arnold Motorsports	Dodge
51	Kevin Lepage	Competitive Edge Motorsports	Chevrolet
72	Kirk Shelmerdine	Kirk Shelmerdine Racing	Ford
77	Brendan Gaughan	Penske-Jasper Racing	Dodge
80	Andy Hillenburg	Hover Motorsports	Ford
88	Dale Jarrett	Robert Yates Racing	Ford
89	Morgan Shepherd	Shepherd Racing Ventures	Dodge
97	Kurt Busch	Roush Racing	Ford
98	Todd Bodine	Mach 1 Motorsports	Ford
99	Jeff Burton	Roush Racing	Ford
Official entry list

== Practice ==
=== First practice ===
The first practice session would occur on Friday, June 18, at 11:20 AM EST, and would last for two hours. Jeff Gordon of Hendrick Motorsports would set the fastest time in the session, with a lap of 37.719 and an average speed of 190.885 miles per hour (307.200 km/h).

Pos.	#	Driver	Team	Make	Time	Speed
1	24	Jeff Gordon	Hendrick Motorsports	Chevrolet	37.719	190.885
2	01	Joe Nemechek	MBV Motorsports	Chevrolet	37.767	190.643
3	48	Jimmie Johnson	Hendrick Motorsports	Chevrolet	37.788	190.537
Full first practice results

=== Second practice ===
The second practice session would occur on Saturday, June 19, at 9:30 AM EST, and would last for 45 minutes. Jeremy Mayfield of Evernham Motorsports would set the fastest time in the session, with a lap of 38.503 and an average speed of 186.998 miles per hour (300.944 km/h).

Pos.	#	Driver	Team	Make	Time	Speed
1	19	Jeremy Mayfield	Evernham Motorsports	Dodge	38.503	186.998
2	77	Brendan Gaughan	Penske-Jasper Racing	Dodge	38.572	186.664
3	25	Brian Vickers	Hendrick Motorsports	Chevrolet	38.672	186.181
Full second practice results

=== Third and final practice ===
The third and final practice session, sometimes referred to as Happy Hour, occurred on Saturday, June 19, at 11:10 AM EST, and would last for 45 minutes. Elliott Sadler of Robert Yates Racing would set the fastest time in the session, with a lap of 38.477 and an average speed of 187.125 miles per hour (301.148 km/h).

Pos.	#	Driver	Team	Make	Time	Speed
1	38	Elliott Sadler	Robert Yates Racing	Ford	38.477	187.125
2	19	Jeremy Mayfield	Evernham Motorsports	Dodge	38.639	186.340
3	0	Ward Burton	Haas CNC Racing	Chevrolet	38.654	186.268
Full Happy Hour practice results

== Qualifying ==
Qualifying was held on Friday, June 18, at 3:05 PM EST. Each driver would have two laps to set a fastest time; the fastest of the two would count as their official qualifying lap. Positions 1-38 would be decided on time, while positions 39-43 would be based on provisionals. Four spots are awarded by the use of provisionals based on owner's points. The fifth is awarded to a past champion who has not otherwise qualified for the race. If no past champ needs the provisional, the next team in the owner points will be awarded a provisional.

Jeff Gordon of Hendrick Motorsports would win the pole, setting a time of 37.723 and an average speed of 190.865 miles per hour (307.167 km/h).

Dave Blaney of Richard Childress Racing would crash on his first lap, forcing him to use a provisional.

Two drivers would fail to qualify: Kerry Earnhardt and Carl Long.

=== Full qualifying results ===
Pos.	#	Driver	Team	Make	Time	Speed
1	24	Jeff Gordon	Hendrick Motorsports	Chevrolet	37.723	190.865
2	25	Brian Vickers	Hendrick Motorsports	Chevrolet	37.861	190.169
3	48	Jimmie Johnson	Hendrick Motorsports	Chevrolet	37.862	190.164
4	12	Ryan Newman	Penske-Jasper Racing	Dodge	37.882	190.064
5	31	Robby Gordon	Richard Childress Racing	Chevrolet	37.904	189.954
6	77	Brendan Gaughan	Penske-Jasper Racing	Dodge	37.921	189.868
7	97	Kurt Busch	Roush Racing	Ford	37.928	189.833
8	19	Jeremy Mayfield	Evernham Motorsports	Dodge	37.931	189.818
9	41	Casey Mears	Chip Ganassi Racing	Dodge	37.932	189.813
10	2	Rusty Wallace	Penske-Jasper Racing	Dodge	37.937	189.788
11	8	Dale Earnhardt Jr.	Dale Earnhardt, Inc.	Chevrolet	37.949	189.728
12	18	Bobby Labonte	Joe Gibbs Racing	Chevrolet	37.966	189.643
13	16	Greg Biffle	Roush Racing	Ford	37.976	189.593
14	0	Ward Burton	Haas CNC Racing	Chevrolet	38.012	189.414
15	6	Mark Martin	Roush Racing	Ford	38.046	189.245
16	01	Joe Nemechek	MBV Motorsports	Chevrolet	38.047	189.240
17	99	Jeff Burton	Roush Racing	Ford	38.060	189.175
18	17	Matt Kenseth	Roush Racing	Ford	38.065	189.150
19	15	Michael Waltrip	Dale Earnhardt, Inc.	Chevrolet	38.130	188.828
20	10	Scott Riggs	MBV Motorsports	Chevrolet	38.141	188.773
21	29	Kevin Harvick	Richard Childress Racing	Chevrolet	38.169	188.635
22	38	Elliott Sadler	Robert Yates Racing	Ford	38.177	188.595
23	43	Jeff Green	Petty Enterprises	Dodge	38.189	188.536
24	40	Sterling Marlin	Chip Ganassi Racing	Dodge	38.194	188.511
25	21	Ricky Rudd	Wood Brothers Racing	Ford	38.218	188.393
26	32	Ricky Craven	PPI Motorsports	Chevrolet	38.354	187.725
27	20	Tony Stewart	Joe Gibbs Racing	Chevrolet	38.373	187.632
28	49	Ken Schrader	BAM Racing	Dodge	38.396	187.520
29	22	Scott Wimmer	Bill Davis Racing	Dodge	38.431	187.349
30	42	Jamie McMurray	Chip Ganassi Racing	Dodge	38.435	187.329
31	5	Terry Labonte	Hendrick Motorsports	Chevrolet	38.499	187.018
32	51	Kevin Lepage	Competitive Edge Motorsports	Chevrolet	38.534	186.848
33	45	Kyle Petty	Petty Enterprises	Dodge	38.565	186.698
34	9	Kasey Kahne	Evernham Motorsports	Dodge	38.596	186.548
35	50	P. J. Jones	Arnold Motorsports	Dodge	38.689	186.099
36	4	Jimmy Spencer	Morgan–McClure Motorsports	Chevrolet	38.705	186.023
37	88	Dale Jarrett	Robert Yates Racing	Ford	38.780	185.663
38	37	Todd Bodine	R&J Racing	Dodge	38.796	185.586
Provisionals
39	30	Dave Blaney	Richard Childress Racing	Chevrolet	—	—
40	89	Morgan Shepherd	Shepherd Racing Ventures	Dodge	39.213	183.613
41	72	Kirk Shelmerdine	Kirk Shelmerdine Racing	Ford	40.530	177.646
42	98	Geoff Bodine	Mach 1 Motorsports	Ford	38.797	185.581
43	02	Derrike Cope	SCORE Motorsports	Chevrolet	39.148	183.917
Failed to qualify or withdrew
44	33	Kerry Earnhardt	Richard Childress Racing	Chevrolet	38.868	185.242
45	00	Carl Long	McGlynn Racing	Dodge	39.184	183.749
WD	23	Dave Blaney	Bill Davis Racing	Dodge	—	—
WD	80	Andy Hillenburg	Hover Motorsports	Ford	—	—
Official qualifying results

== Race results ==
Fin	St	#	Driver	Team	Make	Laps	Led	Status	Pts	Winnings
1	4	12	Ryan Newman	Penske-Jasper Racing	Dodge	200	22	running	185	$176,367
2	34	9	Kasey Kahne	Evernham Motorsports	Dodge	200	0	running	170	$155,900
3	37	88	Dale Jarrett	Robert Yates Racing	Ford	200	13	running	170	$142,817
4	3	48	Jimmie Johnson	Hendrick Motorsports	Chevrolet	200	6	running	165	$100,600
5	22	38	Elliott Sadler	Robert Yates Racing	Ford	200	12	running	160	$113,508
6	24	40	Sterling Marlin	Chip Ganassi Racing	Dodge	200	44	running	155	$108,665
7	18	17	Matt Kenseth	Roush Racing	Ford	200	1	running	151	$119,093
8	12	18	Bobby Labonte	Joe Gibbs Racing	Chevrolet	200	0	running	142	$111,723
9	2	25	Brian Vickers	Hendrick Motorsports	Chevrolet	200	0	running	138	$79,190
10	19	15	Michael Waltrip	Dale Earnhardt, Inc.	Chevrolet	200	0	running	134	$103,846
11	7	97	Kurt Busch	Roush Racing	Ford	200	0	running	130	$85,705
12	25	21	Ricky Rudd	Wood Brothers Racing	Ford	200	0	running	127	$94,121
13	17	99	Jeff Burton	Roush Racing	Ford	200	0	running	124	$101,807
14	29	22	Scott Wimmer	Bill Davis Racing	Dodge	200	0	running	121	$91,865
15	39	30	Dave Blaney	Richard Childress Racing	Chevrolet	200	0	running	118	$75,415
16	6	77	Brendan Gaughan	Penske-Jasper Racing	Dodge	200	13	running	120	$74,065
17	21	29	Kevin Harvick	Richard Childress Racing	Chevrolet	200	0	running	112	$101,043
18	33	45	Kyle Petty	Petty Enterprises	Dodge	200	0	running	109	$79,865
19	8	19	Jeremy Mayfield	Evernham Motorsports	Dodge	200	0	running	106	$85,465
20	20	10	Scott Riggs	MBV Motorsports	Chevrolet	200	1	running	108	$91,202
21	11	8	Dale Earnhardt Jr.	Dale Earnhardt, Inc.	Chevrolet	200	0	running	100	$107,593
22	10	2	Rusty Wallace	Penske-Jasper Racing	Dodge	200	7	running	102	$104,048
23	13	16	Greg Biffle	Roush Racing	Ford	200	0	running	94	$72,190
24	27	20	Tony Stewart	Joe Gibbs Racing	Chevrolet	200	0	running	91	$106,543
25	35	50	P. J. Jones	Arnold Motorsports	Dodge	199	0	crash	88	$63,140
26	31	5	Terry Labonte	Hendrick Motorsports	Chevrolet	199	0	crash	85	$89,140
27	23	43	Jeff Green	Petty Enterprises	Dodge	199	0	running	82	$88,375
28	36	4	Jimmy Spencer	Morgan–McClure Motorsports	Chevrolet	198	0	running	79	$72,475
29	26	32	Ricky Craven	PPI Motorsports	Chevrolet	194	0	running	76	$77,654
30	14	0	Ward Burton	Haas CNC Racing	Chevrolet	192	0	engine	73	$59,190
31	9	41	Casey Mears	Chip Ganassi Racing	Dodge	191	0	running	70	$58,540
32	42	98	Geoff Bodine	Mach 1 Motorsports	Ford	190	0	running	67	$58,465
33	5	31	Robby Gordon	Richard Childress Racing	Chevrolet	188	0	running	64	$94,502
34	15	6	Mark Martin	Roush Racing	Ford	182	0	running	61	$66,285
35	16	01	Joe Nemechek	MBV Motorsports	Chevrolet	174	0	engine	58	$66,145
36	38	37	Todd Bodine	R&J Racing	Dodge	170	0	vibration	55	$58,095
37	30	42	Jamie McMurray	Chip Ganassi Racing	Dodge	114	0	engine	52	$66,045
38	1	24	Jeff Gordon	Hendrick Motorsports	Chevrolet	88	81	engine	59	$120,923
39	28	49	Ken Schrader	BAM Racing	Dodge	86	0	engine	46	$57,900
40	40	89	Morgan Shepherd	Shepherd Racing Ventures	Dodge	76	0	handling	43	$57,865
41	32	51	Kevin Lepage	Competitive Edge Motorsports	Chevrolet	71	0	overheating	40	$57,830
42	43	02	Derrike Cope	SCORE Motorsports	Chevrolet	37	0	ignition	37	$57,790
43	41	72	Kirk Shelmerdine	Kirk Shelmerdine Racing	Ford	13	0	handling	34	$57,108
Official race results

Previous race: 2004 Pocono 500	NASCAR Nextel Cup Series; 2004 season	Next race: 2004 Dodge/Save Mart 350
