= BAM Racing =

Former American stock car racing team

- Owner(s): Beth Ann Morgenthau; Tony Morgenthau
- Base: Charlotte, North Carolina
- Series: Sprint Cup Series
- Race drivers: Ken Schrader; Mike Bliss; David Gilliland; Robby Gordon; Klaus Graf
- Manufacturer: Dodge (2002-2008); Toyota (2008-2010)
- Opened: 2000
- Closed: 2010

Career
- Debut: 2002 Daytona 500 (Daytona)
- Latest race: 2008 Goody's Cool Orange 500 (Martinsville)
- Races competed: 167
- Drivers' Championships: 0
- Race victories: 0
- Pole positions: 0

BAM Racing was a NASCAR racing team based in Charlotte, North Carolina, owned by Beth Ann and Tony Morgenthau. The team began racing in the ARCA RE/MAX Series in 2000 before moving to NASCAR in 2001.

== Sprint Cup Series ==
=== Car No. 49 history ===
BAM Racing attempted its first Cup race at the Talladega 500 in 2001 with Andy Hillenburg, but failed to qualify. They also attempted the Pepsi 400, Pennsylvania 500 and the Brickyard 400 with Hillenburg, as well as the Pennzoil Freedom 400 with Rich Bickle, but did not qualify for any of those races.

BAM switched to Dodge for 2002, and acquired equipment from American Equipment Racing owner Buz McCall, who also provided the shop for use. The team qualified for the 2002 Daytona 500 with Shawna Robinson as its driver, who was scheduled to compete in 24 races. However, she struggled and her last race for the season was at the second Daytona race where she would finish 40th. Kevin Lepage, Stuart Kirby, Ron Hornaday, Stacy Compton and Derrike Cope would finish out the season with a best finish of 22nd at Talladega.

For the 2003 season it was announced that Ken Schrader would drive the No. 49. The team was forced to run with multiple sponsors throughout the year but most of the year the car was sponsored by AT&T through its 1-800-CALL-ATT collect call service. The team qualified for 32 races and had a best finish of 8th at Michigan. In 2004, it was announced BAM Racing had secured a deal with Schwan Food Company for multiple years. They were able to achieve a best finish of 6th during the season, had three less DNF's, and improved their average finish by two places.

Schwan's and Schrader again returned for the 2005 season and BAM had its best season to date with three top tens and an average finish of 25th place. After the conclusion of the 2005 season, Ken Schrader left to join Wood Brothers/JTG Racing. For 2006, Schrader was replaced by Brent Sherman who brought along sponsorship from Serta Mattresses. Sherman was to run for the Rookie of the Year award. However, after struggling through the start of the season he was released in favor of veteran Jimmy Spencer. Spencer was also an advisor for BAM and was a mentor for Sherman during his time there. However, Sherman's departure from the team left it unsponsored, as Serta had followed Sherman from ARCA racing to Busch Series and Cup series racing. Spencer raced from the spring Martinsville race until the spring Richmond race, when Mike Wallace took over. In May 2006, Kevin Lepage left Front Row Motorsports to take over the No. 49, before he was replaced by Mike Bliss in October. Chris Cook was hired to drive for the team to run the road course events, but failed to qualify for both events.

In 2007, BAM Racing was to race with Mike Bliss as the driver, using Evernham engines, but Bliss failed to qualify for 11 out of 15 attempts, and resigned midway through the season. Chad Chaffin was the team's interim driver at Loudon and Chicagoland, and Larry Foyt racing at Daytona. In the team's first attempt to qualify after Bliss' resignation at Loudon, Chaffin made the race after Brian Vickers and the No. 83 Team Red Bull Toyota were disqualified after failing post-qualifying inspection. Journeyman road racer Klaus Graf attempted several races in the No. 49, but didn't qualify for any of them due to engine blowups and a rain shower cancelling qualifying. Bliss briefly returned for a few races, before journeyman John Andretti was hired to complete the rest of the season for BAM. John Andretti was signed to drive the full 2008 season, but the contract was nullified just days before 2008 Daytona testing to put Ken Schrader in the seat in hopes of attracting more sponsorship. Schrader drove in the Budweiser Shootout, but failed to qualify for the first two races of the season.

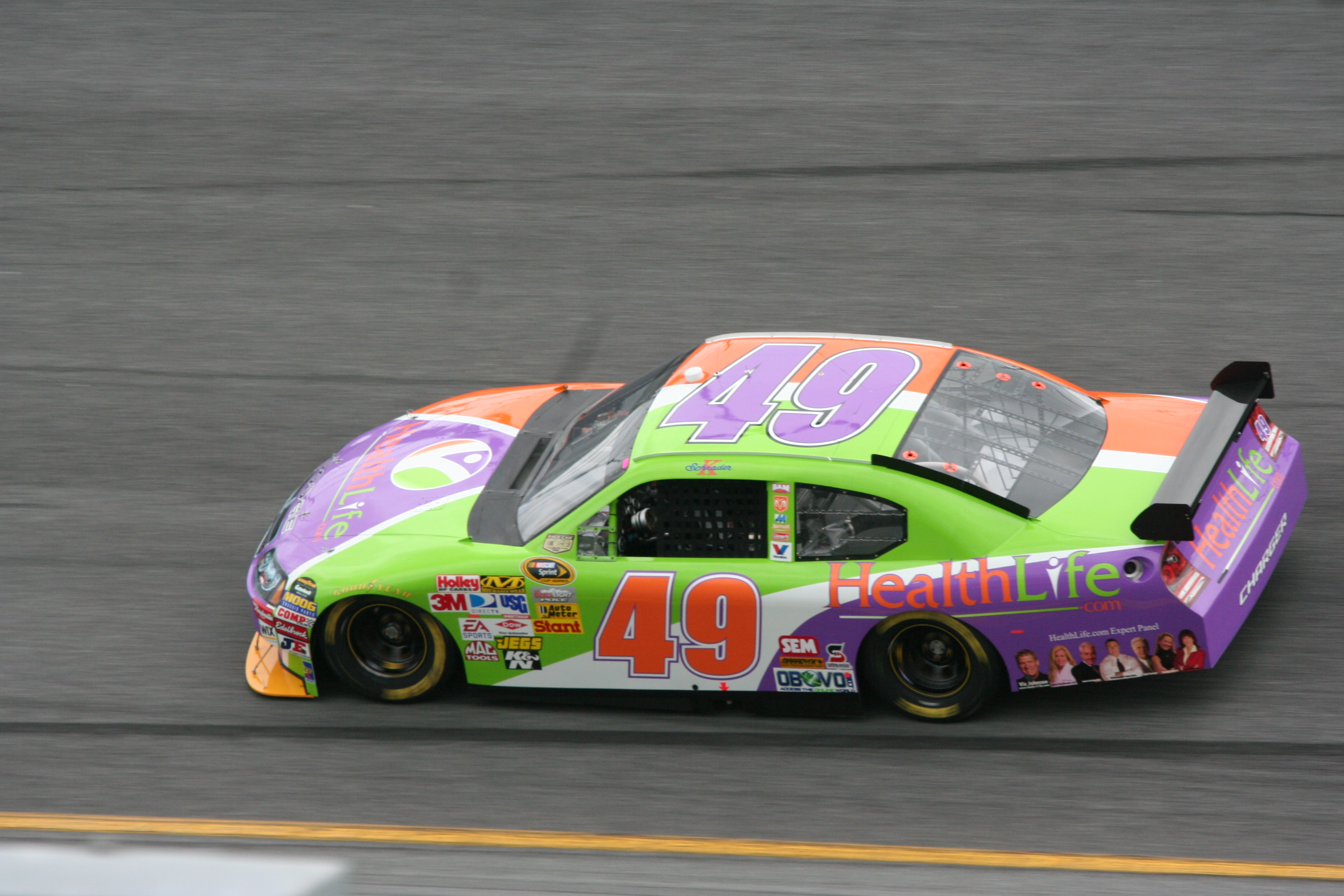
2008 Daytona 500.

The team switched from Dodge to Toyota before the Goody's Cool Orange 500, along with announcing Microsoft's Small Business division as their sponsor. BAM promptly announced that they would be withdrawing from the next two races at Texas and Phoenix to refocus the team's efforts. Both the expenses of switching manufacturers and the pullout of Microsoft to Michael Waltrip Racing have forced BAM Racing to push their scheduled return further back, with NASCAR.com reporting on April 15, 2008, that the team may not return to racing until the fall. However, BAM made a minor attempt at a comeback in the Sprint All-Star Race. BAM fielded a ride for Petty Enterprises developmental driver Chad McCumbee, the car was a Dodge with sponsorship from Marathon Oil. McCumbee finished 13th.

On July 11, 2008, Sports Illustrated reported that BAM Racing was in talks with Barack Obama regarding a one-race sponsorship at Pocono, through BAM spokesman Rhett Vandiver. However, Obama spokesman Bill Burton told Yahoo! Sports that the sponsorship would not happen. The team took the 2009 season off due to the economy and its unwillingness to be a start and park operation.

Warner Music Nashville announced a strategic marketing alliance that gave WMN exclusive promotional opportunities with the NASCAR Sprint Cup racing team. Under the agreement, WMN artists had the opportunity to participate in branding and promotional programs at NASCAR events. The team planned to attempt a full schedule in 2010 with the new partnership and to run Toyotas. Larry the Cable Guy was to be featured on the car for the Daytona 500, with WMN artists Blake Shelton, Whitney Duncan, Gloriana, Jessica Harp, Jason Jones and James Otto joining the team for later races.

On January 8, the team announced it would align with Robby Gordon and his self-owned team for the 2010 season. The join contract stated that RGM/BAM would have at least one car present at each race and would jointly field Gordon's No. 7 Toyota at certain races with sponsorship from WMN. Although it was announced that BAM would field the #49 car alongside the #7 after the Daytona 500, the #49 car did not show up and Gordon ran the #7 under BAM/Warner sponsorship until the 2010 Coca-Cola 600. BAM was not seen afterwards; it was later announced that the RGM/BAM partnership had dissolved and that RGM is exploring taking legal action against BAM Racing and Warner Music Nashville. The team made no further attempts for the remainder of 2010.

In September 2019, former American Equipment Racing owner Buz McCall confirmed in an interview with a fan that BAM is now defunct.

==== Car No. 49 results ====
NASCAR Sprint Cup Series results
Year	Driver	No.	Make	1	2	3	4	5	6	7	8	9	10	11	12	13	14	15	16	17	18	19	20	21	22	23	24	25	26	27	28	29	30	31	32	33	34	35	36	Owners	Pts
2001	Andy Hillenburg	49	Pontiac	DAY	CAR	LVS	ATL	DAR	BRI	TEX	MAR	TAL; DNQ	CAL	RCH	CLT	DOV	MCH	POC	SON	DAY; DNQ	CHI	NHA	POC; DNQ	IND; DNQ	GLN	MCH	BRI	DAR	RCH	DOV	KAN	CLT	MAR	TAL	PHO	CAR				N/A	-
2001	Rich Bickle	49	Chevy																																		HOM; DNQ	ATL	NHA	N/A	-
2002	Shawna Robinson	49	Dodge	DAY; 24	CAR	LVS; 42	ATL; 34	DAR; 42	BRI	TEX; 36	MAR	TAL; DNQ	CAL; 42	RCH						DAY; 40																				41st	1004
2002	Ron Hornaday Jr.	49	Dodge												CLT; 36	DOV	POC	MCH	SON		CHI; DNQ	NHA	POC	IND; DNQ	GLN															41st	1004
2002	Derrike Cope	49	Dodge																							MCH; 37	BRI; 41	DAR	RCH	NHA						ATL; 37	CAR	PHO; 38	HOM; 34	41st	1004
2002	Kevin Lepage	49	Dodge																												DOV; 36									41st	1004
2002	Stuart Kirby	49	Dodge																													KAN; 37								41st	1004
2002	Stacy Compton	49	Dodge																														TAL; 22	CLT; 42	MAR					41st	1004
2003	Ken Schrader	49	Dodge	DAY; 42	CAR; 24	LVS; 28	ATL; 38	DAR; 17	BRI; 37	TEX; 24	TAL; 33	MAR; 10	CAL; 30	RCH; 24	CLT; 28	DOV; 26	POC; 43	MCH; 42	SON; 33	DAY; 41	CHI; 28	NHA; 36	POC; 26	IND; DNQ	GLN; DNQ	MCH; 8	BRI; 12	DAR; 38	RCH; 25	NHA; 37	DOV; 33	TAL; 21	KAN; 28	CLT; DNQ	MAR; 22	ATL; 26	PHO; 27	CAR; 36	HOM; DNQ	38th	2569
2004	Ken Schrader	49	Dodge	DAY; 40	CAR; 27	LVS; 32	ATL; 26	DAR; 22	BRI; 6	TEX; 19	MAR; 40	TAL; 23	CAL; 20	RCH; 23	CLT; 31	DOV; 34	POC; 25	MCH; 39	SON; 23	DAY; 35	CHI; 27	NHA; 37	POC; 21	IND; 18	GLN; 28	MCH; 28	BRI; 32	CAL; 33	RCH; 30	NHA; 16	DOV; 25	TAL; 20	KAN; 27	CLT; 21	MAR; 31	ATL; 23	PHO; 20	DAR; 30	HOM; 25	33rd	3032
2005	Ken Schrader	49	Dodge	DAY; 39	CAL; 14	LVS; 34	ATL; 26	BRI; 23	MAR; 24	TEX; 23	PHO; 38	TAL; 8	DAR; 18	RCH; 30	CLT; 9	DOV; 37	POC; 20	MCH; 28	SON; 35	DAY; 10	CHI; 26	NHA; 26	POC; 31	IND; 22	GLN; 32	MCH; 25	BRI; 11	CAL; 29	RCH; 19	NHA; 40	DOV; 28	TAL; 26	KAN; 17	CLT; 34	MAR; 13	ATL; 34	TEX; 29	PHO; 30	HOM; 22	31st	3159
2006	Brent Sherman	49	Dodge	DAY; 21	CAL; 37	LVS; 34	ATL; 36	BRI; 42		TEX; DNQ	PHO; 32	TAL; DNQ																												40th	1865
2006	Jimmy Spencer	49	Dodge						MAR; DNQ																															40th	1865
2006	Mike Wallace	49	Dodge										RCH; 35																											40th	1865
2006	Kevin Lepage	49	Dodge											DAR; 36	CLT; DNQ	DOV; 39	POC; 31	MCH; 34		DAY; DNQ	CHI; DNQ	NHA; 30	POC; 34	IND; DNQ		MCH; 41	BRI; 21	CAL; 38	RCH; 33	NHA; 30	DOV; 37	KAN; DNQ								40th	1865
2006	Chris Cook	49	Dodge																SON; DNQ						GLN; DNQ															40th	1865
2006	Mike Bliss	49	Dodge																														TAL; 26	CLT; 42	MAR; DNQ	ATL; 26	TEX; 23	PHO; 41	HOM; 39	40th	1865
2007	Mike Bliss	49	Dodge	DAY; DNQ	CAL; DNQ	LVS; DNQ	ATL; 21	BRI; 17	MAR; 30	TEX; 41	PHO; DNQ	TAL; DNQ	RCH; DNQ	DAR; DNQ	CLT; DNQ	DOV; DNQ	POC; DNQ	MCH; DNQ						POC; DNQ																47th	1502
2007	Klaus Graf	49	Dodge																SON; DNQ						GLN; DNQ															47th	1502
2007	Chad Chaffin	49	Dodge																	NHA; 36		CHI; 31																		47th	1502
2007	Larry Foyt	49	Dodge																		DAY; DNQ																			47th	1502
2007	Ken Schrader	49	Dodge																				IND; 25																	47th	1502
2007	John Andretti	49	Dodge																							MCH; 37	BRI; 40	CAL; 37	RCH; 37	NHA; DNQ	DOV; 37	KAN; 33	TAL; 33	CLT; 42	MAR; 33	ATL; 28	TEX; DNQ	PHO; DNQ	HOM; DNQ	47th	1502
2008	Ken Schrader	49	Dodge	DAY; DNQ	CAL; DNQ	LVS; 21	ATL; DNQ	BRI; 41																																48th	276
2008	Ken Schrader	49	Toyota						MAR; 37	TEX	PHO	TAL	RCH	DAR	CLT	DOV	POC	MCH	SON	NHA	DAY	CHI	IND	POC	GLN	MCH	BRI	CAL	RCH	NHA	DOV	KAN	TAL	CLT	MAR	ATL	TEX	PHO	HOM	48th	276
2010	David Gilliland	49	Toyota	DAY; DNQ	CAL	LVS	ATL	BRI	MAR	PHO	TEX	TAL	RCH	DAR	DOV	CLT	POC	MCH	SON	NHA	DAY	CHI	IND	POC	GLN	MCH	BRI	ATL	RCH	NHA	DOV	KAN	CAR	CLT	MAR	TAL	TEX	PHO	HOM	N/A	-

=== Car Nos. 59 and 70 history ===
The team fielded a second car for Klaus Graf at Infineon in 2004, the No. 59 SEM Products/Color Horizons Dodge. He finished 17th. The team attempted a number of races later in the year, but failed to qualify for all of them. Larry Foyt also attempted a number of races late in the 2004 season, instead running the No. 70 due to the system of the 2004 provisional points. The team shut down at the conclusion of the 2004 season. Before shutting down, the team was looking to run a second or even a third car in 2005 but sponsorship never materialized.

==== Car No. 59/70 results ====
NASCAR Nextel Cup Series results
Year	Driver	No.	Make	1	2	3	4	5	6	7	8	9	10	11	12	13	14	15	16	17	18	19	20	21	22	23	24	25	26	27	28	29	30	31	32	33	34	35	36	Owners	Pts
2004	Klaus Graf	59	Dodge	DAY	CAR	LVS	ATL	DAR	BRI	TEX	MAR	TAL	CAL	RCH	CLT	DOV	POC	MCH	SON; 17	DAY	CHI	NHA	POC	IND	GLN; DNQ	MCH	BRI	CAL	RCH	NHA	DOV	TAL	KAN		MAR; DNQ					61st	188
2004	Larry Foyt	59	Dodge																															CLT; DNQ		ATL; DNQ	PHO	DAR	HOM	61st	188
2004	Larry Foyt	70	Dodge	DAY	CAR	LVS	ATL	DAR	BRI	TEX	MAR	TAL	CAL	RCH	CLT	DOV	POC	MCH	SON	DAY	CHI	NHA	POC	IND	GLN	MCH	BRI	CAL	RCH	NHA	DOV	TAL	KAN	CLT	MAR	ATL	PHO	DAR	HOM; DNQ	N/A	-

== ARCA Re/Max Series ==
=== Car No. 49 history ===
The team was created in 2000 from the remnants of the ISM Racing that was not being used by Tyler Jet Motorsports. NASCAR Winston Cup Series team. Tony Morgenthau gave the team as a birthday present to his wife, Beth Ann, whose initials comprised the name of the team. BAM Racing attempted 6 races late in the 2000 ARCA Season with Matt Mullins. The team would have a best start of 10th at Charlotte in October and a best finish of 13th at Pocono in June. The team ceased operations upon BAM's move to Winston Cup.

=== Car Nos. 69 and 99 history ===
BAM Racing returned to ARCA in 2004 as part of Klaus Graf's development program. The German driver made his debut in the No. 69 BAM Racing Dodge at Nashville Superspeedway in October, starting 5th and finishing 3rd. He ran a second race in the No. 99 BAM Racing Dodge at Talladega in October, where he started 7th and finished 29th after a crash.
