= Brian Vickers =

American racing driver (born 1983)

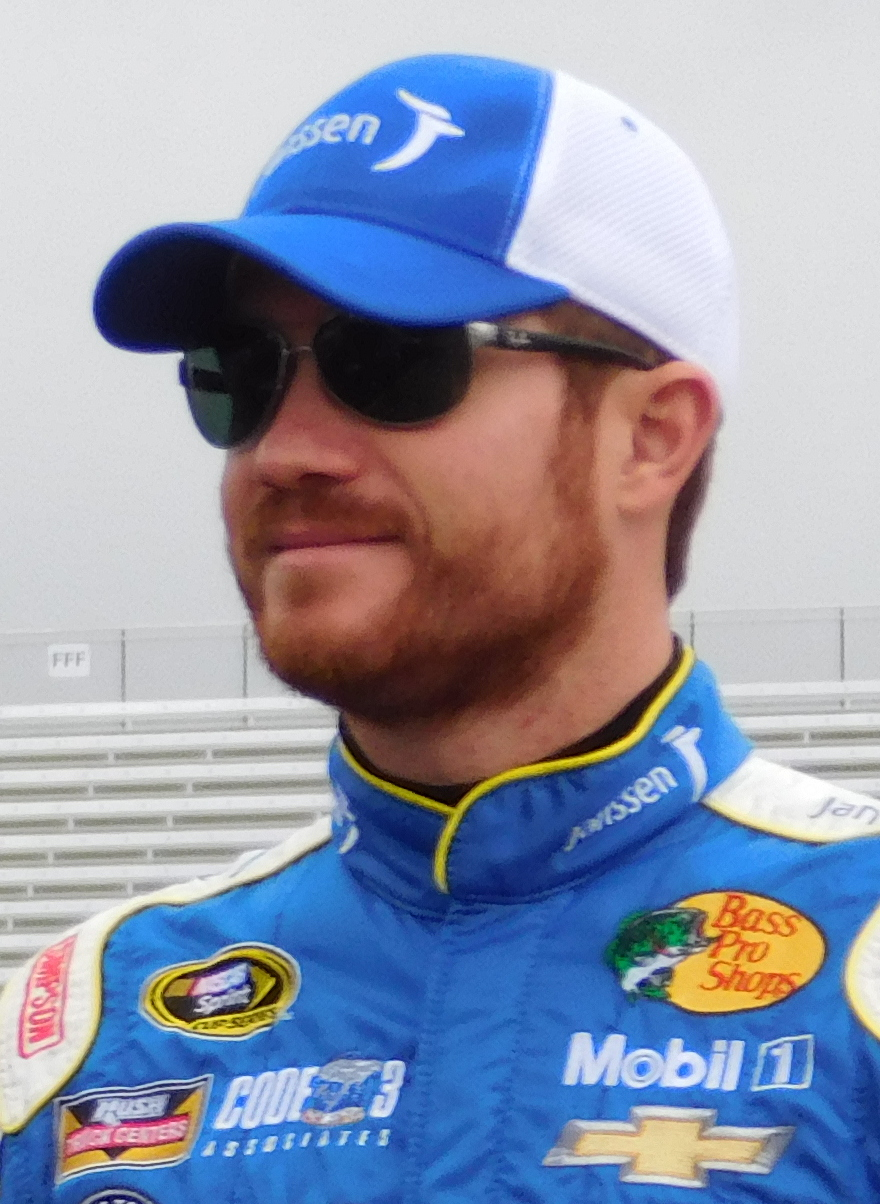
- Vickers at Martinsville Speedway in 2016
- Born: Brian Lee Vickers; October 24, 1983 (age 43); Thomasville, North Carolina, U.S.
- Height: 5 ft 11 in (1.80 m)
- Weight: 157 lb (71 kg)
- Achievements: 2003 NASCAR Busch Series Champion

NASCAR Cup Series career
- 323 races run over 14 years
- 2016 position: 42nd
- Best finish: 12th (2009)
- First race: 2003 UAW-GM Quality 500 (Charlotte)
- Last race: 2016 Duck Commander 500 (Texas)
- First win: 2006 UAW-Ford 500 (Talladega)
- Last win: 2013 Camping World RV Sales 301 (New Hampshire)
Wins	Top tens	Poles
3	78	12

NASCAR O'Reilly Auto Parts Series career
- 148 races run over 12 years
- 2013 position: 10th
- Best finish: 1st (2003)
- First race: 2001 GNC Live Well 250 (Milwaukee)
- Last race: 2013 Dollar General 300 (Charlotte)
- First win: 2003 Kroger 200 (IRP)
- Last win: 2003 Stacker 200 Presented by YJ Stinger (Dover)
Wins	Top tens	Poles
3	78	4

ARCA Menards Series West career
- 1 race run over 1 year
- Best finish: 42nd (2006)
- First race: 2006 Blue Lizard Australian Suncream 200 (Sonoma)
Wins	Top tens	Poles
1	1	1

24 Hours of Le Mans career
- Years: 2012
- Teams: AF Corse
- Best finish: 6th in class
- Class wins: 0
- Statistics up to date as of April 10, 2016.

Brian Lee Vickers (born October 24, 1983) is an American former professional stock car racing driver. He last drove the No. 14 Chevrolet SS for Stewart–Haas Racing as an interim driver in the NASCAR Sprint Cup Series for the injured Tony Stewart in 2016. He won the 2003 NASCAR Busch Series championship driving for Hendrick Motorsports. Vickers was also among the first series of full-time drivers for Toyota after the manufacturer first entered the Sprint Cup Series.

Vickers's career has been marred by a series of health issues since 2010 that have included blood clots and heart problems.

== Racing career ==
=== Early years ===
Vickers began racing go-karts in 1994. Over the next three years, he won eighty races in the World Karting Association, and won three championships, including the 1995 championship against three-time winner Mike Schwartz. In 1998, he moved to the Allison Legacy Series and won five races during the course of the season. After competing in the NASCAR Dodge Weekly Racing Series in 1999, he moved to USAR ProCup and was named Rookie of the Year. He won two races in 2000. In 2001, he won five more races and finished 2nd in points.

Vickers made his Busch Series debut in the 2001 GNC Live Well 250 at Milwaukee in the No. 29 car, owned by his father Clyde Vickers 's BLV Motorsports team. He qualified 30th and finished 37th after a crash. Vickers ran three more races that season; his best finish was 25th at North Carolina. In 2002, Vickers began running the Busch Series in his father's No. 40 Dodge Intrepid. He drove in twenty-one races, competing for Rookie of the Year honors; his best finish was 7th in the Hardee's 250 at Richmond, his only Top 10 of the season on his way to finishing 30th in series points.

=== 2003 ===
After a lack of funding for his family-owned team, Vickers was hired to replace Ricky Hendrick in the No. 5 GMAC Chevrolet owned by Hendrick Motorsports. In 2003, Vickers won three races and the championship by fourteen points over David Green. Vickers became the then-youngest champion in Busch Series history at only twenty years old. Vickers made his Cup debut in the 2003 UAW-GM Quality 500 at Charlotte; qualifying 20th and finishing 33rd in the No. 60 Haas Automation Chevy. He ran four more races that season in Hendrick's No. 25 UAW/Delphi Chevy; qualifying in the Top 5 each time. He almost won 2 poles at Phoenix & Rockingham, but posted only one Top 20 finish.

=== 2004 ===
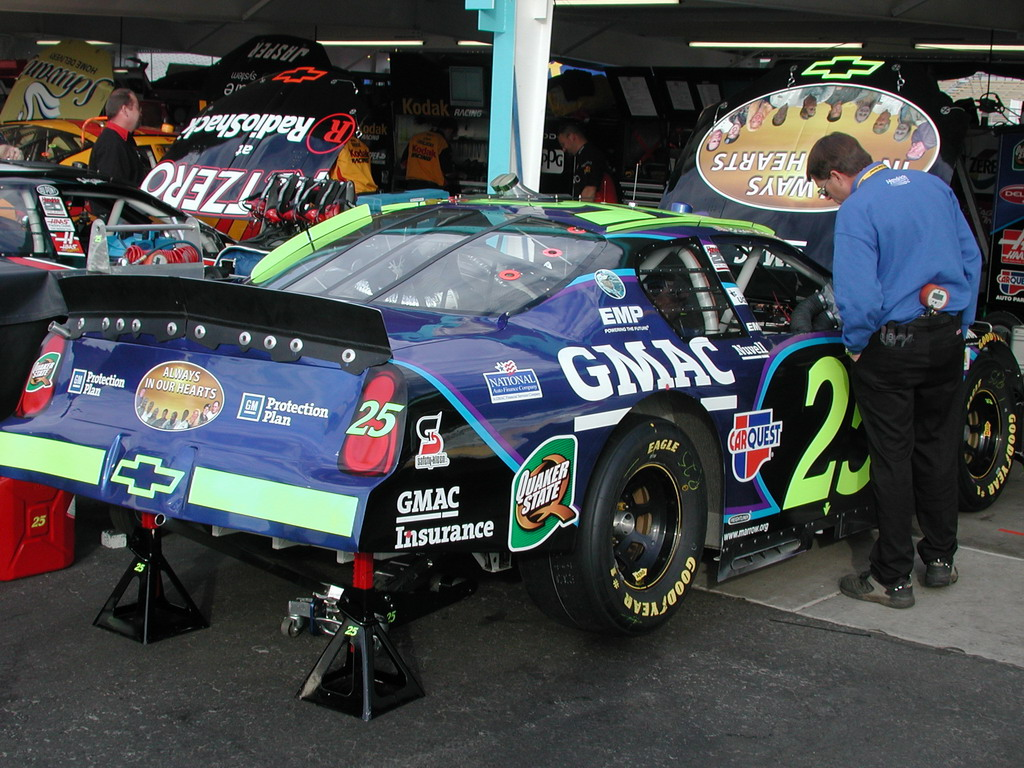
Vickers's crew working on his 2004 car

In 2004, Vickers ran the No. 25 in the Cup Series full-time, carrying sponsorship from Ditech and GMAC. He won two poles, had four Top 10's, and finished 3rd behind Kasey Kahne and Brendan Gaughan for Rookie of the Year.

=== 2005 ===
In 2005, Vickers won the Nextel Open exhibition race. He was right behind Mike Bliss on the last lap. Rather than make a move to go around Bliss, Vickers ran into the back of the No. 0, spinning him out. Vickers went on to win. That qualified him for the annual Nextel All-Star Challenge, in which he finished 3rd. Vickers finished the year 17th in Cup points with ten Top 10's, including career runs at the Pocono 500 and the Coca-Cola 600. He also returned to the Busch Series in a limited capacity in 2005, and finished 3rd at Watkins Glen in the No. 5. He drove five other races in the No. 57.

=== 2006 ===
Vickers started out the 2006 season with a 7th-place finish in the Daytona 500. He went on to finish 15th in points with nine Top 10's, including a win at Talladega. However, the season was marred by conflicts within Hendrick Motorsports. On June 25, Vickers announced that he would leave Hendrick and drive for the new Team Red Bull in 2007. In the UAW-Ford 500, Dale Earnhardt Jr. was leading with Jimmie Johnson in 2nd and Vickers in 3rd on the final lap. Going down the backstretch, Johnson attempted to pass Dale Jr. on the inside, and Vickers tried to follow Jimmie and bump draft him past Earnhardt. Unfortunately, Vickers was too late to follow Johnson to the inside and instead hooked Jimmie in the right rear, causing Johnson to turn right into Dale Jr., and the two went spinning down to the infield to bring out the caution. Vickers went on to score his first victory. Johnson was livid with Vickers, and both he and his crew chief Chad Knaus questioned Vickers's motives with the bump, leading Knaus to state that Vickers had "run out of talent" prior to wrecking his teammate. Fortunately for Vickers, Johnson ended up winning the 2006 NEXTEL Cup Series Championship at Homestead-Miami Speedway leaving that race at Talladega behind. In 2006, Vickers also won a one-off race for Hendrick in the Autozone West Series at Sonoma.

=== 2007 ===
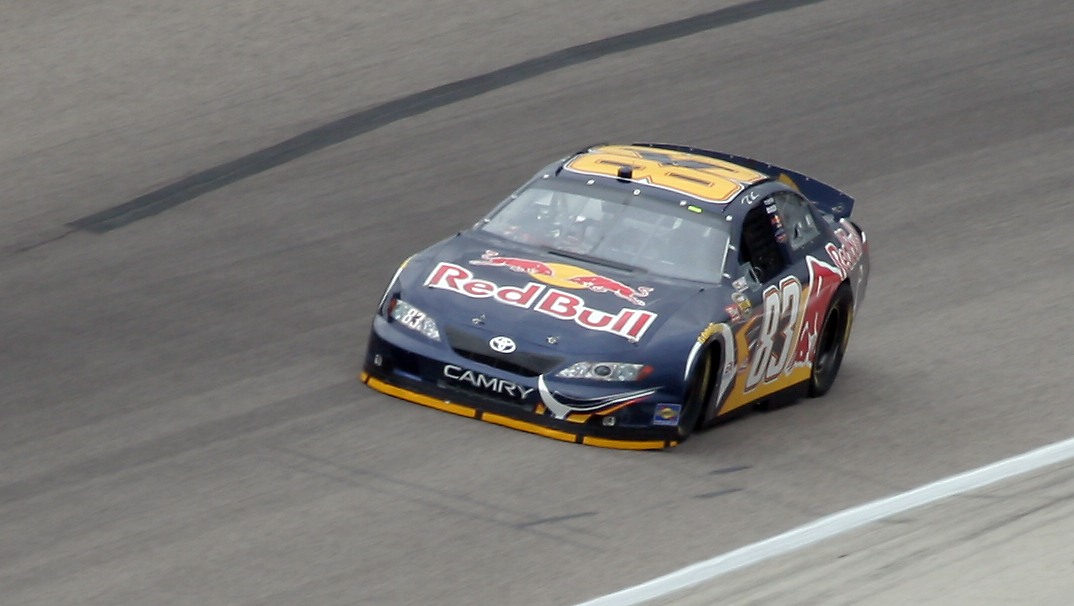
2007 Nextel Cup car

In 2007, Vickers drove the No. 83 Red Bull-sponsored Toyota Camry for the new Team Red Bull, with crew chief Doug Richert, as a teammate to A. J. Allmendinger. This season started out poorly when Vickers suffered a blown tire during his qualifying race for the Daytona 500, causing him to fail to qualify. The next week, the team regrouped, however, and scored a 10th-place finish in their first outing, the Auto Club 500 at California, which was coincidentally Toyota's first Top 10 in the Cup Series. Two weeks later, Vickers led Toyota's first lap in the Cup Series at Atlanta.

On May 27, 2007, Vickers gave Toyota its first top-five ever in the Coca-Cola 600. Toyota brought a new engine to Charlotte, and Vickers showed its potential and surprised many by leading more than seventy laps of the race and having the dominant car. However, towards the end of the race, the power steering of the vehicle began to fail and eventually ceased operation completely. The team's luck continued to decline as Vickers soon blew a tire and slid into the turn four wall. Immediately as Vickers entered pit road, the caution flew for debris on the track; supposedly from his car. This was a saving grace, as it allowed the No. 83 car to stay on the lead lap, albeit off the pace and out of contention for the win. Richert managed to salvage the race through pit strategy, enabling Vickers to score a 5th-place finish.

Late in the 2007 season, Richert was fired from Team Red Bull and replaced by Randy Cox, who was formerly employed on Team Red Bull's Research and Development team. Vickers struggled for the remainder of the season as Team Red Bull began to focus on developing its Car of Tomorrow program, which would start competing full-time the next season. The resulting inattention to its "current car" program severely hampered Vickers's efforts during the remaining races of that platform. It was another problem in a long line for the entire Red Bull organization, as Vickers finished 38th in points and failed to qualify for thirteen races while his teammate Allmendinger missed nineteen races and finished 43rd. One of Vickers's failures to make the race was due to a disqualification from the lineup of the 2007 Lenox Industrial Tools 300, after his car failed post-qualifying inspection three times. Overall, Vickers scored one Top 5 and five Top 10's in 23 starts with an average finish of 25.1, along with five DNFS.

=== 2008 ===
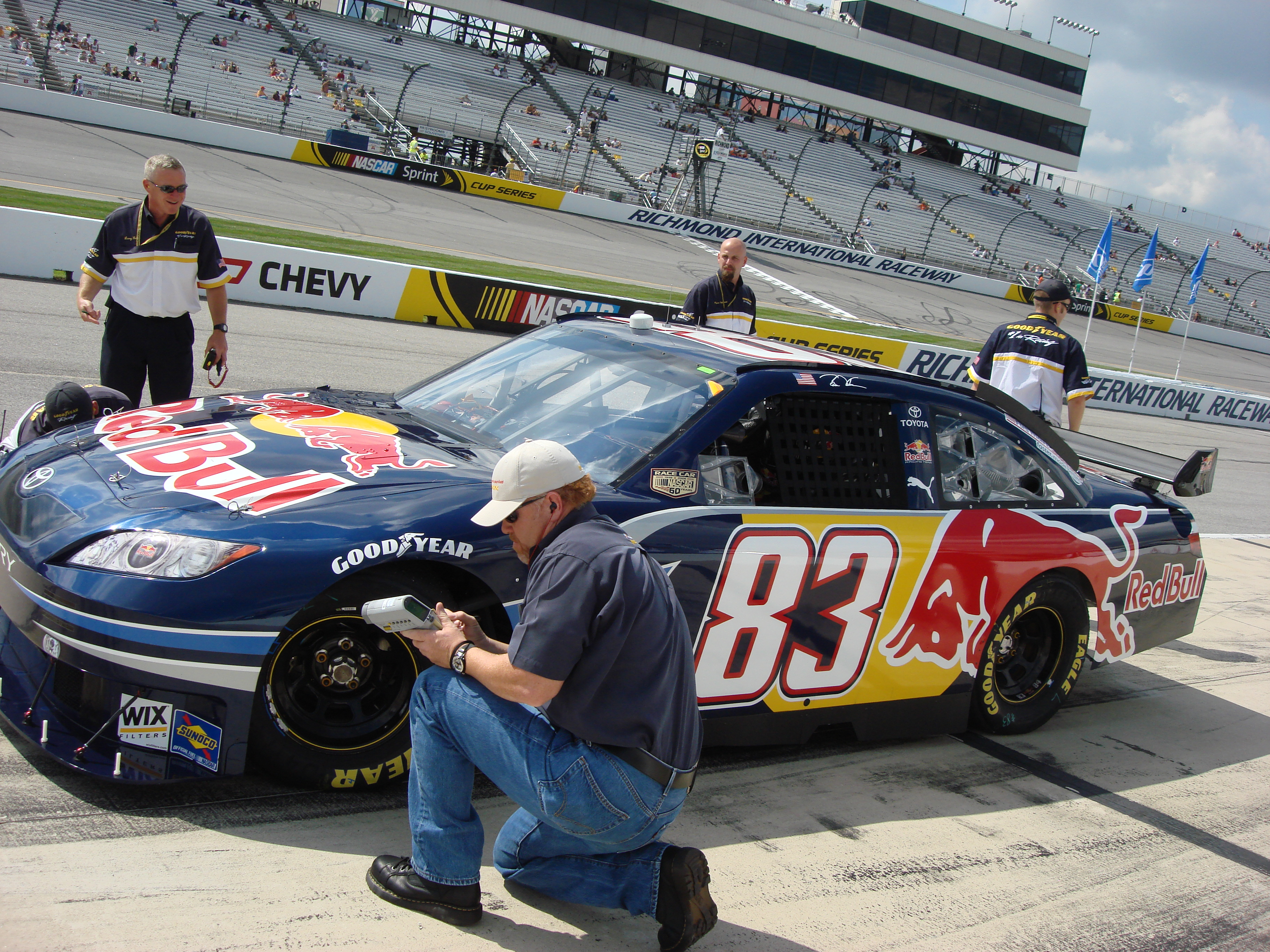
2008 Sprint Cup car

In 2008, Vickers, with new crew chief Kevin Hamlin, qualified for the fiftieth running of the Daytona 500 after racing himself in the field with an 11th-place finish in the Gatorade Duel. He went on to make the next four races with an average finish of 21st, including a 9th-place finish at Atlanta.

Vickers's pit crew won the 2008 Pit Crew Challenge during the All-Star weekend. Vickers went on the next weekend and led sixty-one laps in the Coca-Cola 600 before he lost his left rear wheel and crashed about halfway through the race. Vickers then followed up with a 2nd-place run at Pocono to Kasey Kahne. Vickers made every race that season in 2008, scoring three Top 5's and six Top 10's with an average finish of 20.7 while finishing an improved 19th in the standings.

=== 2009: Only Chase appearance ===
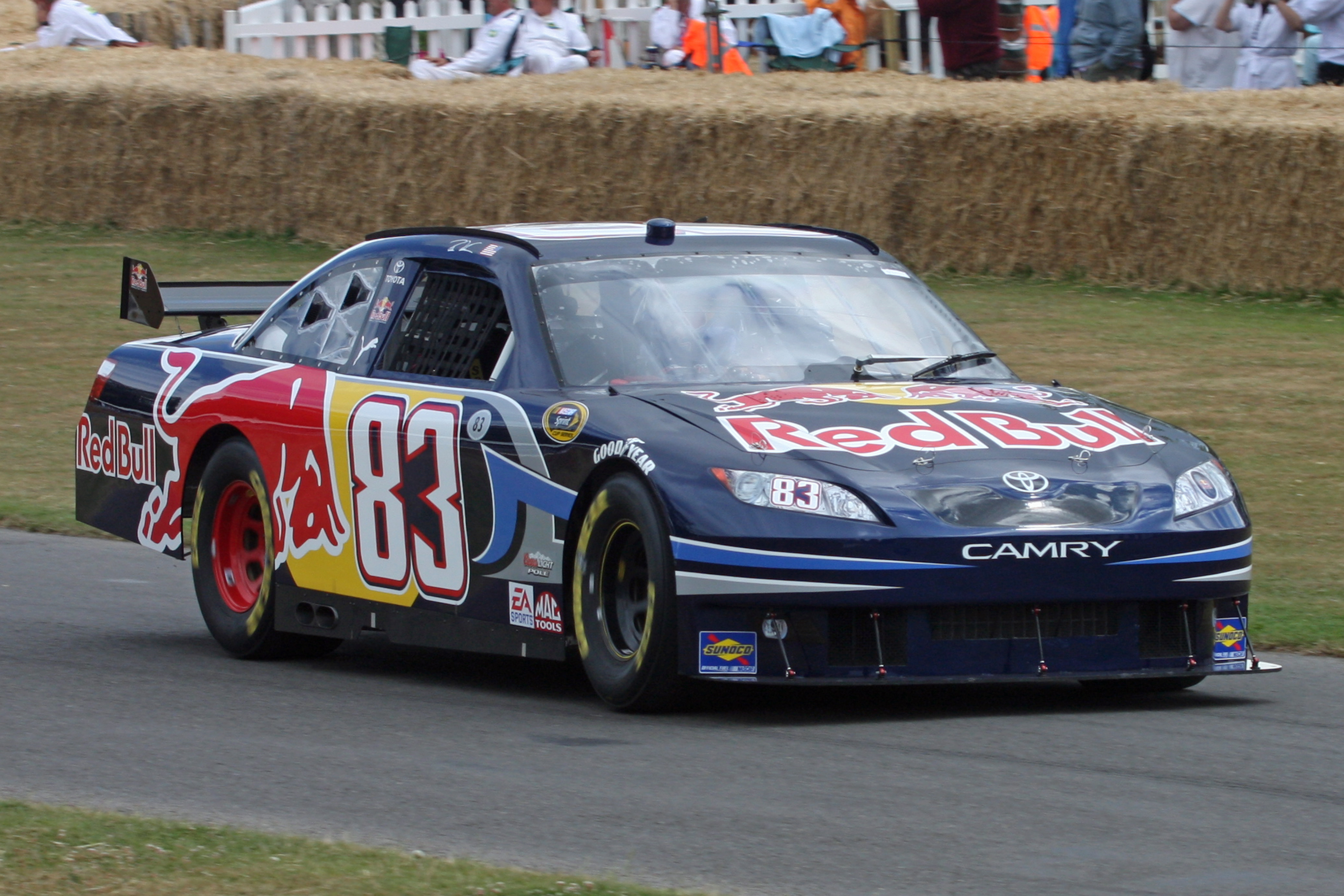
2009 Sprint Cup car

For the 2009 season, Vickers got a new crew chief: Ryan Pemberton. It was announced that he has picked up an additional sponsor in Mighty Auto Parts.

Vickers's season began with controversy in the Daytona 500. Dale Earnhardt Jr. got a run on the backstretch to the inside of Vickers, but Vickers blocked. Earnhardt Jr. clipped the left rear fender, getting Vickers loose, sending him into the field. Vickers said after the race that Earnhardt should have been black-flagged. Earnhardt later stated that he was unaware that Vickers was a lap down, and that both were fighting for the Lucky Dog position. Earnhardt later apologized.

Vickers won the pole for the Auto Club 500, but had to go to the rear because of an engine change. Vickers went on to finish 10th.

Vickers ran in the top five all day during the Kobalt Tools 500. In the final laps, Vickers was chasing down Kurt Busch for the win, but Robby Gordon blew a tire to bring out the caution, allowing Jeff Gordon and Carl Edwards to catch Vickers on the restart. Vickers finished 5th.

Vickers won his second pole of the season for the Crown Royal 400 at Richmond. Vickers would finish 15th in that race.

On June 10, 2009, Team Red Bull conducted a promotional pit stop in New York City. Vickers pulled the No. 83 Red Bull Toyota to the side of the road, and the team changed four tires in Times Square with traffic still moving around them.

Vickers won his third pole of the season for the Lifelock 400 at Michigan. Vickers never led a lap in the race and earned a 9th-place finish.

Vickers won his fourth pole of the season for the Toyota/Save Mart 350 at Sonoma. Vickers finished 16th in that race.

Vickers won his fifth pole of the season for the Lifelock.com 400 at Chicagoland. Vickers finished 7th in the race.

Vickers won his sixth pole of the season at Michigan. He also won the pole for the Carfax 250. In the Nationwide race, he and his former teammate Kyle Busch were racing hard for the lead on the final lap, allowing the NASCAR rookie Brad Keselowski to pass both of them for the win. After the race, Busch confronted Vickers on pit road, accusing him of rough driving.

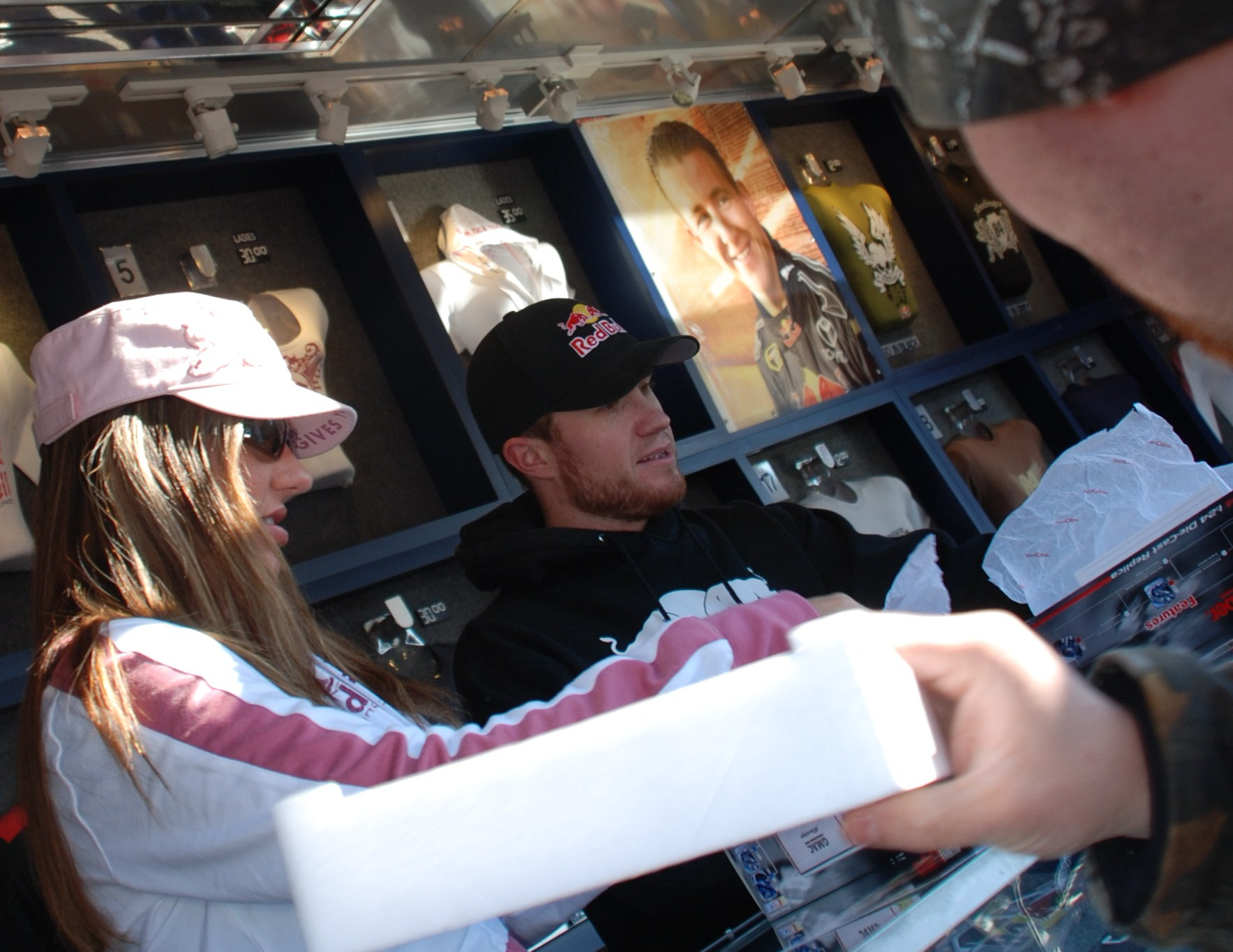
Vickers at a merchandise trailer

The next day, Vickers won the Carfax 400 from the pole for his second career Sprint Cup victory, Red Bull's first victory, and Toyota's first victory at Michigan. He did so after a late race gamble of not coming in to pit during the race's final caution. On the final restart, Vickers was leading and Jimmie Johnson was 2nd. With a little over forty laps to go, Vickers stayed behind Johnson most of the time, trying to save fuel. With just over three laps to go, Johnson ran out of fuel, while Vickers barely had enough to claim the win. This victory was also the first one for Red Bull Racing and the first for Red Bull's sponsorship in NASCAR.

Two days after the win, Vickers signed a multi-year extension with Red Bull.

After finishing seventh in the Chevy Rock and Roll 400 at Richmond, Vickers clinched a spot in the 2009 Chase for the Sprint Cup. He would finish 12th in the standings, his highest points finish to date. His six poles in 2009 were second to Mark Martin's seven for most poles of the year. Vickers also had four Top 5's and thirteen Top 10's with an average finish of 17.3.

=== 2010 ===
On May 13, 2010, it was announced that Vickers, who had earned three Top 10's in the first eleven races, would not be participating in the Autism Speaks 400 at Dover International Speedway due to an undisclosed medical condition, later revealed to be blood clots in his legs and around his lungs. Casey Mears was announced as his replacement. This ended a streak of 87 consecutive starts, which dated back to Atlanta in 2007. Vickers hoped to run a handful of laps before handing the car over to a relief driver in order to earn points, but was not medically cleared.

On May 21, 2010, six days after being released from a hospital for the aforementioned blood clot issue, it was announced that Vickers would miss the remainder of the season. His replacements were Casey Mears, Reed Sorenson, Mattias Ekstrom, Boris Said, and Kasey Kahne. Vickers's abbreviated 2010 season consisted of three Top 10's in eleven races.

=== 2011 ===
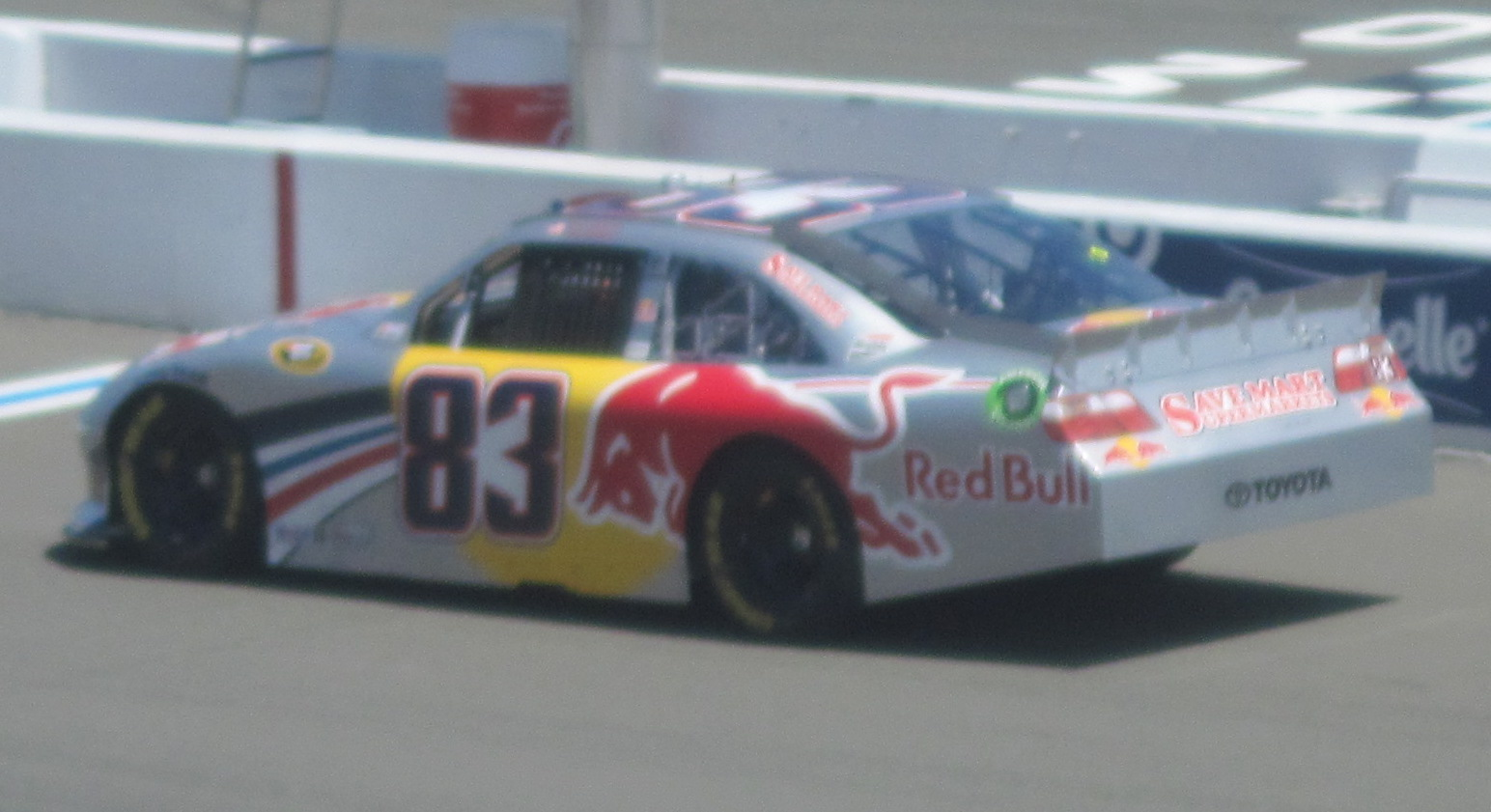
Vickers during the 2011 Toyota/Save Mart 350

Vickers was cleared to race in 2011. His season started out in the big one at Daytona, where he finished 31st. A week later at Phoenix, he was involved in the big one again when Matt Kenseth and he made contact, triggering a thirteen-car pileup. Vickers was involved in two other notable run-ins with Kenseth in the fall races at Martinsville and Phoenix as well as run-ins with Tony Stewart at Sonoma, Marcos Ambrose at Richmond, and Jamie McMurray at Martinsville. He would finish the year 25th in points with seven Top 10's. After the season's end, Red Bull shut down its Cup Series team, leaving Vickers without a ride for 2012. BK Racing bought the assets and offered Vickers a ride for 2012, but he declined, leaving Vickers on the sidelines.

=== 2012 ===
Vickers started the 2012 season without a ride, but it was announced in early March that he would drive the No. 55 Toyota for Michael Waltrip Racing at both races at Bristol, Martinsville, and Loudon, sharing the ride with Mark Martin and Michael Waltrip. In his first race in the No. 55, Vickers dominated the first half of the race, leading for 125 laps. He would eventually finish 5th. On March 30, Michael Waltrip Racing announced that Vickers would drive at Sonoma, and Watkins Glen, expanding his race schedule to eight races in the No. 55. Vickers also drove the team's AF Corse-Waltrip No. 61 Ferrari in the GTE-AM class for the FIA World Endurance Championship at the 6 Hours of Spa and the 24 Heures du Mans. Vickers announced at the fall Martinsville race that he renewed his contract with MWR and will race nine more times in the No. 55 car next year, sharing the ride with Mark Martin (24) and Michael Waltrip (3). Additionally, Vickers will return to the Nationwide Series full-time, driving for Joe Gibbs Racing.

=== 2013 ===
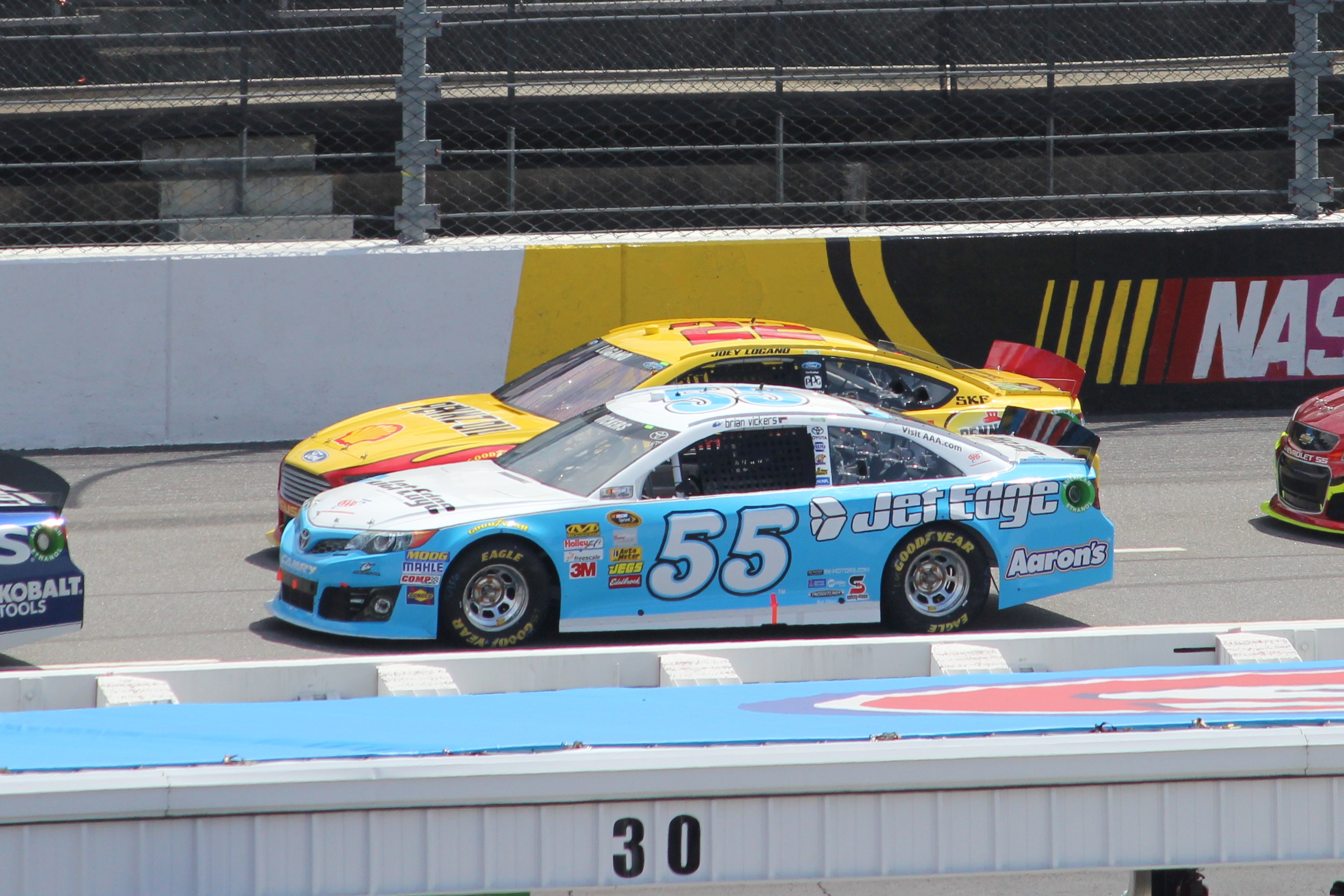
Vickers during the 2013 STP Gas Booster 500

For his 2013 season, Vickers performed well at Bristol. His second ride in the No. 55 at Martinsville was unlucky. He had crashed in the early laps and, after repairing his car, got back on the lead lap and then spun around. After again getting back on the lead lap, on the final lap of the race, he passed Danica Patrick for 11th-place. Seconds later, he was intentionally spun by Kevin Harvick, who was angry with Vickers for prior contact. In reply, Vickers bumped Harvick when entering pit road after the race was over; he climbed out, and the two briefly argued. Vickers ran the No. 11 FedEx Toyota at Texas, Kansas, and Richmond for an injured Denny Hamlin. Though Hamlin returned at Talladega for the Aaron's 499, Vickers substituted for him on lap 23, though he was eventually collected in The Big One less than fifteen laps after the switch.

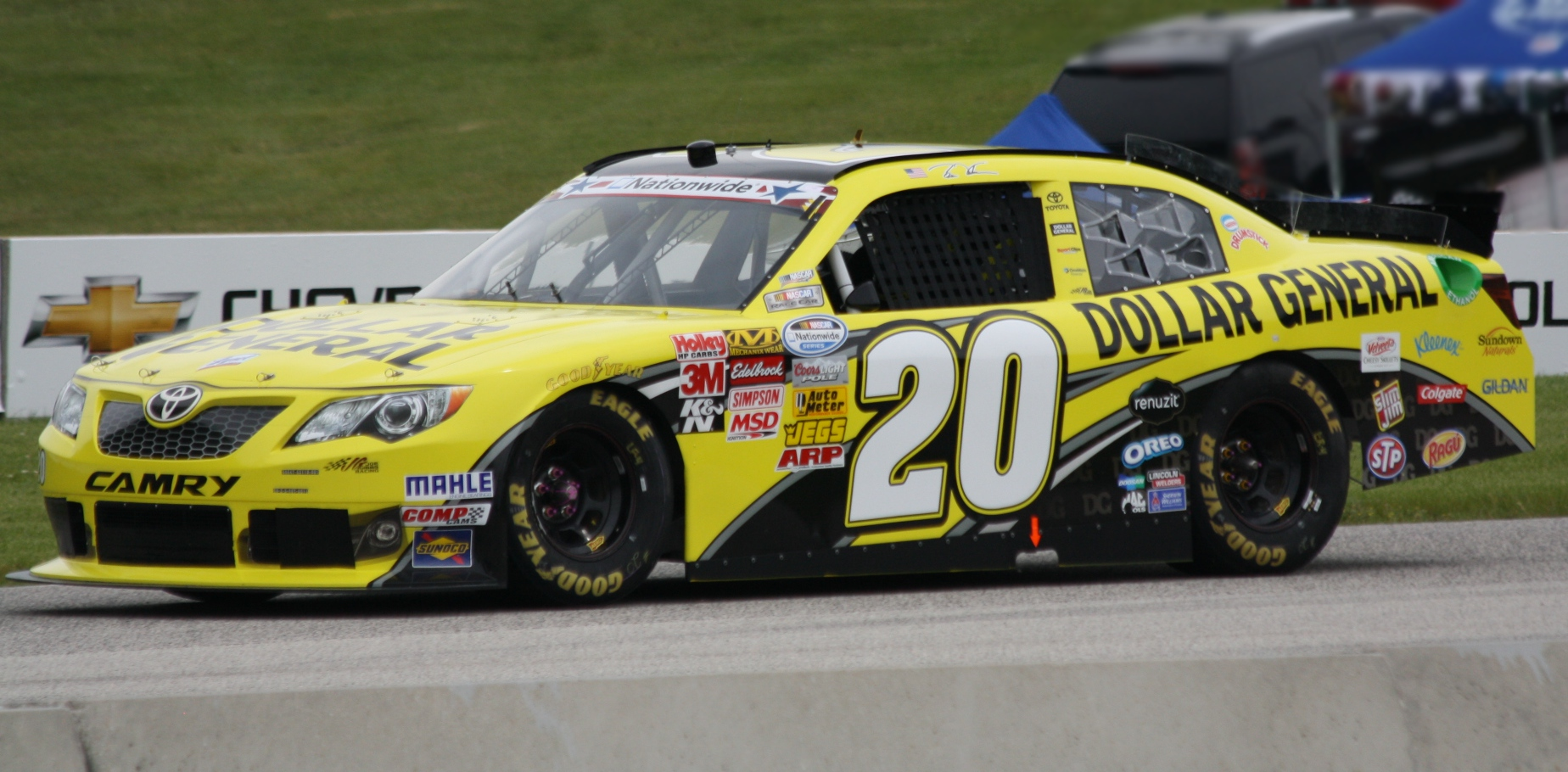
Vickers's 2013 Nationwide Series car at Road America

At Sonoma, Vickers started 34th in his third ride for MWR in the No. 55 Toyota. He led four laps and had a very fast racecar, even though he had to start at the rear of the field because Jason Bowles had qualified the car as Vickers was racing at Road America. While his MWR teammates Martin Truex Jr. and Clint Bowyer ended up in the Top 10, with Truex winning, Vickers ended up in 13th-place.

Vickers led 63 laps in the Nationwide Series race at New Hampshire Motor Speedway but finished 2nd to Kyle Busch. Ironically, the next day, Vickers held off Busch to win his third career Sprint Cup Series race during the 2013 Camping World RV Sales 301 at New Hampshire after making a late race pass on Tony Stewart, and retaining the lead on a green-white-checkered finish as Stewart ran out of fuel. For Vickers, this broke a 75-race winless streak (not counting the races he had missed in 2010). On August 13, 2013, Vickers was announced as the full-time driver of the No. 55 for the 2014 and 2015 seasons; on August 19, it was announced that following the release of Mark Martin to substitute for the injured Tony Stewart, Vickers would drive the No. 55 in twelve of the season's final 13 races, the exception being Talladega, where Michael Waltrip will drive the car, as previously scheduled.

After the Federated Auto Parts 400 in early September, Vickers was determined to be one of the drivers involved in an attempt to manipulate the race so Michael Waltrip Racing teammate Martin Truex Jr. would earn a spot in the Chase for the Sprint Cup. The team was fined a record $300,000, and fifty championship points were deducted per car.

On October 14, 2013, it was announced that Vickers would be forced to sit out the rest of the season due to the discovery of a blood clot in his right calf, a similar issue to the one that caused him to sit out much of 2010; Elliott Sadler substituted for Vickers in the No. 55 Sprint Cup car in the final four races of the season.

=== 2014 ===
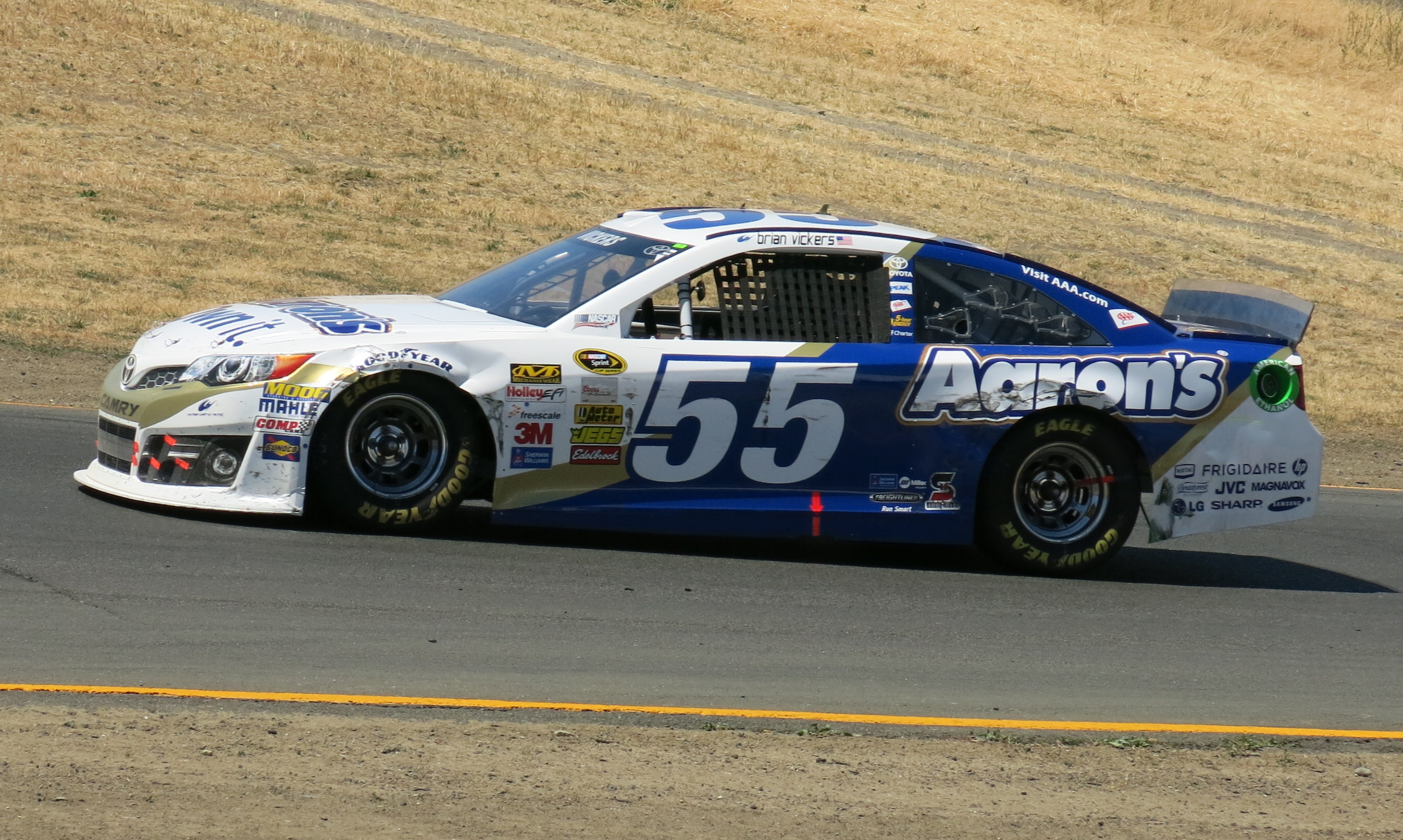
Vickers driving the 55 at Sonoma Raceway in 2014

In August 2013, Michael Waltrip Racing announced that Vickers would drive the No. 55 full-time starting in 2014. Billy Scott was named Vickers's crew chief, having previously served as lead engineer of the No. 55 team for the past two seasons. Vickers's best finish of the year was a 2nd at the Coke Zero 400 at Daytona when the rain came in and Vickers missed a huge 25 car pileup and a 4th at Texas when he took two tires on the final stop.

=== 2015 ===
On December 15, 2014, it was announced that Vickers would miss part of the 2015 season due to health issues. Vickers said that his body had been rejecting an artificial patch that had been inserted in 2010 to fix a hole in his heart. He had corrective surgery in December to repair the hole, which was a success, and said that he would need time for rest and rehabilitation. Vickers implied in January that he would only miss a few races. On January 21, 2015, it was announced that Vickers had been medically cleared to return to racing in March, with his season debut expected at Las Vegas Motor Speedway on March 8. It was also announced that NASCAR had granted him a waiver to make him eligible for the Chase for the Sprint Cup championship should he qualify.

Vickers's replacements in the 55 were team boss Michael Waltrip and MWR test driver Brett Moffitt. Before the 2015 Auto Club 400, it was announced that Vickers would again be sidelined because of more blood clots. While Vickers is sidelined, his sponsor on the 55 car would be Janssen Pharmaceutica and their brand of Xarelto. His replacement would again be Moffitt. The same week, Vickers also announced he would be taking blood thinner medication and cannot race for at least three months. On April 28, MWR announced that David Ragan would drive the 55 for the rest of the season. Vickers did not run another race for the rest of 2015.

With his racing future uncertain, Vickers joined NASCAR on NBC as an analyst and worked selected Sprint Cup races on the network during the season.

=== 2016 ===
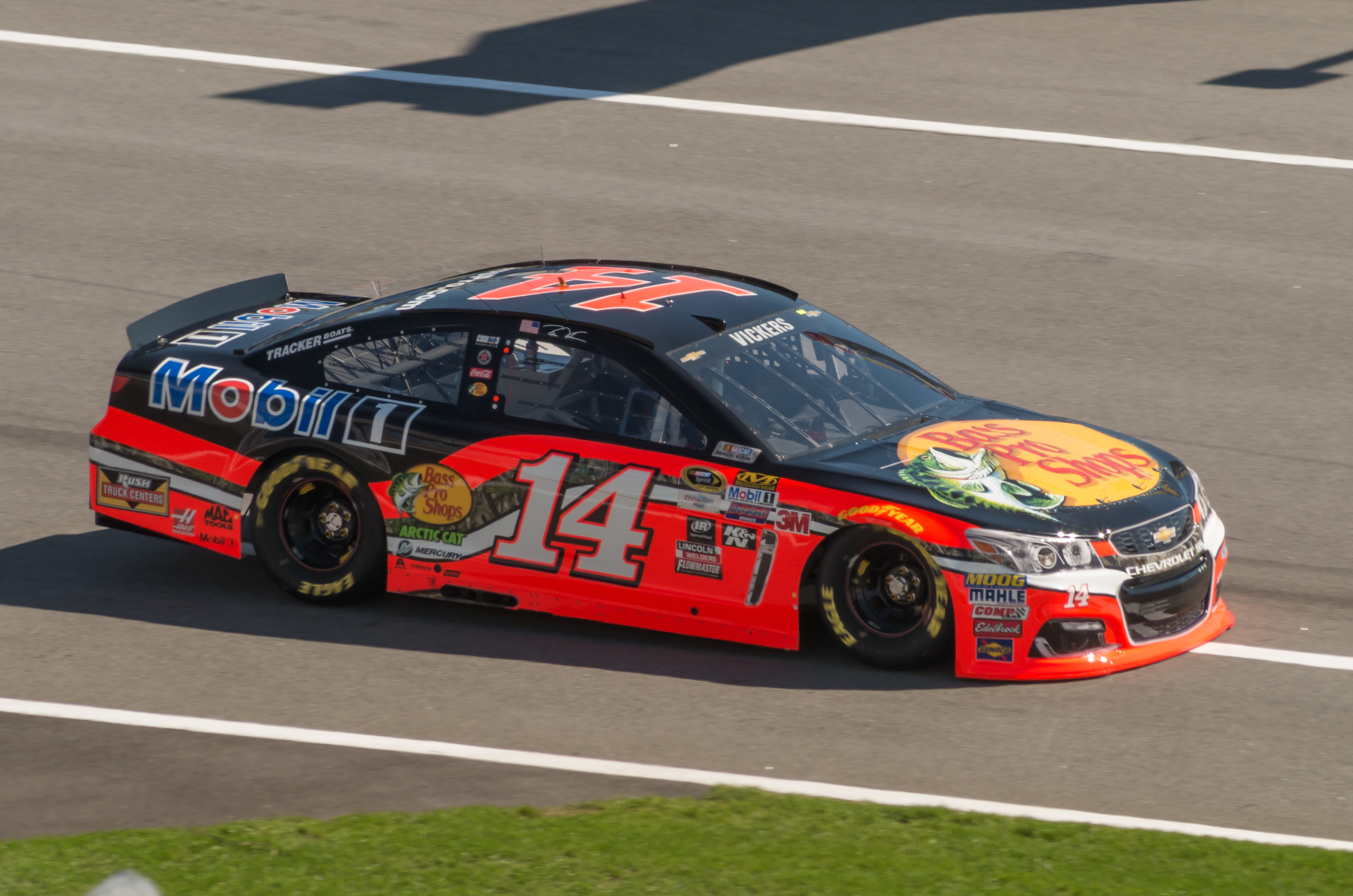
Vickers's 2016 Cup car for Stewart–Haas Racing

In 2016, Stewart–Haas Racing hired Vickers as an interim driver of its No. 14 Chevrolet SS for all the NASCAR Sprint Cup Series events with all sponsors besides Bass Pro Shops (which Ty Dillon was hired for) after Tony Stewart was injured in a sand rail accident. Vickers's best finish of the season was 7th at Martinsville for the running of the STP 500.

== Personal life ==
The son of Clyde and Ramona Vickers, Vickers was born in Thomasville, North Carolina, and now resides in a suburb of New York City.

Vickers was married to Sarah Kellen, a victim of Jeffrey Epstein who allegedly assisted Epstein in scheduling sexualized massages performed by underage girls. Kellen has not been charged in connection to these allegations. On April 14, 2025, it was announced that Vickers and Kellen had officially divorced after 10 years of marriage. In January 2026, due to the Epstein Files Transparency Act, emails in the Epstein files were released that revealed Vickers had contacted Epstein as recently as 2019. Emails released included bawdy chain emails forwarded from Vickers to Epstein and discussion between Epstein and an unnamed party working to assuage concerns about Vickers's sponsorship deal with Aaron's at Michael Waltrip Racing.

== Motorsports career results ==
=== NASCAR ===
(key) (Bold – Pole position awarded by qualifying time. Italics – Pole position earned by points standings or practice time. * – Most laps led.)

==== Sprint Cup Series ====
NASCAR Sprint Cup Series results
Year	Team	No.	Make	1	2	3	4	5	6	7	8	9	10	11	12	13	14	15	16	17	18	19	20	21	22	23	24	25	26	27	28	29	30	31	32	33	34	35	36	NSCC	Pts	Ref
2003	Hendrick Motorsports	25	Chevy	DAY	CAR	LVS	ATL	DAR	BRI	TEX	TAL	MAR	CAL	RCH	CLT	DOV	POC	MCH	SON	DAY	CHI	NHA	POC	IND	GLN	MCH	BRI	DAR	RCH	NHA	DOV	TAL	KAN	CLT; 33	MAR	ATL; 43	PHO; 13	CAR; 24	HOM; 34	49th	379	
2004	Hendrick Motorsports	25	Chevy	DAY; 39	CAR; 16	LVS; 23	ATL; 21	DAR; 23	BRI; 35	TEX; 12	MAR; 13	TAL; 27	CAL; 29	**RCH**; 8	CLT; 15	DOV; 23	POC; 13	MCH; 9	SON; 22	DAY; 9	CHI; 14	NHA; 34	POC; 14	IND; 29	GLN; 30	MCH; 22	BRI; 20	**CAL**; 13	RCH; 37	NHA; 22	DOV; 38	TAL; 36	KAN; 19	CLT; 40	MAR; 27	ATL; 7	PHO; 18	DAR; 21	HOM; 18	25th	3521	
2005	Hendrick Motorsports	25	Chevy	DAY; 21	CAL; 21	LVS; 43	ATL; 6	BRI; 12	MAR; 35	TEX; 34	PHO; 5	TAL; 37	DAR; 16	RCH; 32	CLT; 31*	DOV; 6	POC; 2*	MCH; 41	SON; 34	DAY; 29	CHI; 4	**NHA**; 11	POC; 14	IND; 3	GLN; 8	MCH; 9	BRI; 20	CAL; 3	RCH; 37	NHA; 13	DOV; 14	TAL; 6	KAN; 11	CLT; 12	MAR; 36	ATL; 15	TEX; 19	PHO; 26	HOM; 43	17th	3847	
2006	Hendrick Motorsports	25	Chevy	DAY; 7	CAL; 18	LVS; 22	ATL; 23	BRI; 37	MAR; 8	TEX; 43	PHO; 13	TAL; 3	RCH; 37	DAR; 41	CLT; 37	DOV; 23	POC; 4	MCH; 17	SON; 14	DAY; 18	CHI; 13	NHA; 17	POC; 4	IND; 17	GLN; 16	MCH; 15	BRI; 33	CAL; 41	RCH; 24	NHA; 5	DOV; 29	KAN; 8	TAL; 1	CLT; 10	MAR; 17	ATL; 19	**TEX**; 27	PHO; 11	HOM; 21	15th	3906	
2007	Team Red Bull	83	Toyota	DAY; DNQ	CAL; 10	LVS; DNQ	ATL; 42	BRI; 15	MAR; DNQ	TEX; 14	PHO; DNQ	TAL; DNQ	RCH; DNQ	DAR; 43	CLT; 5	DOV; 19	POC; 35	MCH; 41	SON; DNQ	NHA; DNQ	DAY; 29	CHI; DNQ	IND; 21	POC; 29	GLN; 41	MCH; 8	BRI; DNQ	CAL; 8	RCH; 24	NHA; 43	DOV; 16	KAN; DNQ	TAL; 39	CLT; DNQ	MAR; DNQ	ATL; 10	TEX; 23	PHO; 21	HOM; 42	38th	2065	
2008	Team Red Bull	83	Toyota	DAY; 12	CAL; 11	LVS; 24	ATL; 9	BRI; 39	MAR; 23	TEX; 16	PHO; 25	TAL; 5	RCH; 28	DAR; 25	CLT; 42	DOV; 13	POC; 2	MCH; 4	SON; 14	NHA; 16	DAY; 11	CHI; 6	IND; 42	POC; 28	GLN; 18	**MCH**; 7	BRI; 20	CAL; 12	RCH; 36	NHA; 35	DOV; 31	KAN; 15	TAL; 35	CLT; 18	MAR; 11	ATL; 21	TEX; 18	PHO; 42		19th	3580	
2008	Team Red Bull	84	Toyota																																				HOM; 32	19th	3580	
2009	Team Red Bull	83	Toyota	DAY; 39	**CAL**; 10	LVS; 8	ATL; 5	BRI; 29	MAR; 33	TEX; 16	PHO; 19	TAL; 8	**RCH**; 15	DAR; 31	CLT; 5	DOV; 25	POC; 21	**MCH**; 9	**SON**; 16	NHA; 35	DAY; 7	**CHI**; 7	IND; 5	POC; 6	GLN; 11	**MCH**; 1	BRI; 12	ATL; 7	RCH; 7	NHA; 11	DOV; 18	KAN; 37	CAL; 29	CLT; 34	MAR; 11	TAL; 13	TEX; 26	PHO; 38	HOM; 20	12th	5929	
2010	Team Red Bull	83	Toyota	DAY; 15	CAL; 12	LVS; 31	ATL; 7	BRI; 15	MAR; 6	PHO; 37	TEX; 38	TAL; 29	RCH; 20	DAR; 10	DOV	CLT	POC	MCH	SON	NHA	DAY	CHI	IND	POC	GLN	MCH	BRI	ATL	RCH	NHA	DOV	KAN	CAL	CLT	MAR	TAL	TEX	PHO	HOM	40th	1158	
2011	Team Red Bull	83	Toyota	DAY; 31	PHO; 30	LVS; 10	BRI; 36	CAL; 8	MAR; 17	TEX; 27	TAL; 38	RCH; 10	DAR; 34	DOV; 5	CLT; 18	KAN; 16	POC; 22	MCH; 10	SON; 36	DAY; 12	KEN; 27	NHA; 34	IND; 15	POC; 39	GLN; 18	MCH; 15	BRI; 21	ATL; 11	RCH; 33	CHI; 13	NHA; 5	DOV; 14	KAN; 19	CLT; 20	TAL; 5	MAR; 30	TEX; 21	PHO; 23	HOM; 17	25th	846	
2012	Michael Waltrip Racing	55	Toyota	DAY	PHO	LVS	BRI; 5	CAL	MAR; 18	TEX	KAN	RCH	TAL	DAR	CLT	DOV	POC	MCH	SON; 4	KEN	DAY	NHA; 15	IND	POC	GLN; 43	MCH	BRI; 4	ATL	RCH	CHI	NHA; 9	DOV	TAL	CLT	KAN	MAR; 8	TEX	PHO	HOM	35th	250	
2013	Michael Waltrip Racing	55	Toyota	DAY	PHO	LVS	BRI; 8	CAL	MAR; 11										SON; 13	KEN; 31	DAY	NHA; 1	IND	POC	GLN; 32	MCH	BRI; 4	ATL; 10	RCH; 24	CHI; 38	NHA; 7	DOV; 12	KAN; 32	CLT; 25	TAL	MAR	TEX	PHO	HOM	78th	-50^{2}	
2013	Joe Gibbs Racing	11	Toyota							TEX; 8	KAN; 31	RCH; 35	TAL; RL^{†}	DAR	CLT	DOV	POC	MCH																						78th	-50^{2}	
2014	Michael Waltrip Racing	55	Toyota	DAY; 30	PHO; 25	LVS; 13	BRI; 9	CAL; 7	MAR; 16	TEX; 4	DAR; 26	RCH; 12	TAL; 4	KAN; 14	CLT; 6	DOV; 43	POC; 19	MCH; 42	SON; 14	KEN; 26	DAY; 2	NHA; 21	IND; 19	POC; 37	GLN; 10	MCH; 19	BRI; 21	ATL; 15	RCH; 13	CHI; 24	NHA; 10	DOV; 15	KAN; 10	CLT; 37	**TAL**; 20	MAR; 27	TEX; 16	PHO; 19	HOM; 23	22nd	921	
2015	Michael Waltrip Racing	55	Toyota	DAY	ATL	LVS; 15	PHO; 41	CAL	MAR	TEX	BRI	RCH	TAL	KAN	CLT	DOV	POC	MCH	SON	DAY	KEN	NHA	IND	POC	GLN	MCH	BRI	DAR	RCH	CHI	NHA	DOV	CLT	KAN	TAL	MAR	TEX	PHO	HOM	45th	32	
2016	Stewart–Haas Racing	14	Chevy	DAY; 26	ATL	LVS; 36	PHO	CAL; 13	MAR; 7	TEX; 37	BRI	RCH	TAL	KAN	DOV	CLT	POC	MCH	SON	DAY	KEN	NHA	IND	POC	GLN	BRI	MCH	DAR	RCH	CHI	NHA	DOV	CLT	KAN	TAL	MAR	TEX	PHO	HOM	42nd	86	
^{†} - Relieved Denny Hamlin

===== Daytona 500 =====
Year	Team	Manufacturer	Start	Finish
2004	Hendrick Motorsports	Chevrolet	35	39
2005	Hendrick Motorsports	Chevrolet	28	21
2006	Hendrick Motorsports	Chevrolet	35	7
2007	Team Red Bull	Toyota	DNQ	
2008	Team Red Bull	Toyota	23	12
2009	Team Red Bull	Toyota	6	39
2010	Team Red Bull	Toyota	22	15
2011	Team Red Bull	Toyota	27	31
2014	Michael Waltrip Racing	Toyota	31	30
2016	Stewart–Haas Racing	Chevrolet	18	26

==== Nationwide Series ====
NASCAR Nationwide Series results
Year	Team	No.	Make	1	2	3	4	5	6	7	8	9	10	11	12	13	14	15	16	17	18	19	20	21	22	23	24	25	26	27	28	29	30	31	32	33	34	35	NNSC	Pts	Ref
2001	BLV Motorsports	29	Chevy	DAY	CAR	LVS	ATL	DAR	BRI	TEX	NSH	TAL	CAL	RCH	NHA	NZH	CLT	DOV	KEN	MLW; 37	GLN	CHI	GTW	PPR	IRP; 32	MCH	BRI	DAR	RCH; 29	DOV	KAN	CLT	MEM	PHO	CAR; 25	HOM			72nd	283	
2002	BLV Motorsports	40	Dodge	DAY	CAR; 25	LVS; 20	DAR; 37	BRI; 14	TEX	NSH	TAL	CAL	RCH; 7	NHA	NZH	CLT; 26	DOV	NSH	KEN; 32	MLW; 28	DAY	CHI; 31	GTW	PPR; 21	IRP; 19	MCH	BRI; 38	DAR; 37	RCH; DNQ	DOV; 13	KAN; 39	CLT; 28	MEM; 13	ATL; 12	CAR; 21	PHO; 11	HOM; 34		30th	1914	
2003	Hendrick Motorsports	5	Chevy	DAY; 42	CAR; 8	LVS; 13	DAR; 7	BRI; 14	TEX; 25*	TAL; 23	NSH; 9	CAL; 19	RCH; 16	GTW; 4	NZH; 2	CLT; 14	DOV; 5	NSH; 10	KEN; 6	MLW; 2	DAY; 7	CHI; 3	NHA; 4	PPR; 29	IRP; 1	MCH; 19	BRI; 7	DAR; 1	RCH; 4	DOV; 1*	KAN; 32	CLT; 4	MEM; 5*	ATL; 31	PHO; 3	**CAR**; 6	HOM; 11		1st	4637	
2005	Hendrick Motorsports	57	Chevy	DAY	CAL	MXC	LVS	ATL	NSH	BRI	TEX	PHO	TAL	DAR; 43	RCH	CLT; 13	DOV	NSH	KEN	MLW	DAY; 31	CHI	NHA	PPR	GTW	IRP		MCH; DNQ	BRI	CAL	RCH	DOV; 8	KAN	CLT	MEM	TEX	PHO	HOM; 23	60th	654	
2005	Hendrick Motorsports	5	Chevy																								GLN; 3*												60th	654	
2006	Hendrick Motorsports	57	Chevy	DAY; 32	CAL; 9	MXC	LVS	ATL; 7	BRI	TEX	NSH	PHO	TAL; 4	RCH	DAR; 12	CLT	DOV	NSH	KEN	MLW	DAY; 2	CHI	NHA	MAR	GTW	IRP	GLN	MCH; 16	BRI	CAL	RCH	DOV	KAN	CLT	MEM	TEX	PHO	HOM; 13	42nd	1062	
2007	Braun Racing	32	Toyota	DAY	CAL	MXC	LVS	ATL	BRI	NSH	TEX	PHO	TAL	RCH	DAR	CLT	DOV	NSH	KEN	MLW	NHA	DAY; 13	CHI	GTW	IRP	CGV	GLN												53rd	796	
2007	Braun Racing	10	Toyota																									MCH; 6	BRI; 36	CAL; 27	RCH; 6	DOV	KAN; 9	CLT	MEM	TEX	PHO; 27	HOM	53rd	796	
2008	Braun Racing	10	Toyota	DAY; 4	CAL											**CLT**; 5	DOV	NSH	KEN	MLW	NHA		CHI; 4	GTW	IRP	CGV	GLN		BRI; 9							TEX; 37	PHO	HOM	36th	1544	
2008	Braun Racing	32	Toyota			**LVS**; 36	ATL; 22	BRI	NSH	TEX; 6	PHO	MXC	TAL	RCH	DAR							DAY; 37						MCH; 2		CAL; 3	RCH	DOV	KAN	CLT; 3	MEM				36th	1544	
2009	Braun Racing	32	Toyota	DAY; 6	CAL; 8	LVS; 3	BRI	TEX	NSH	PHO	TAL; 20	RCH	DAR; 10	CLT; 4	DOV; 4	NSH	KEN	MLW	NHA; 12	DAY; 7	CHI; 3	GTW	IRP	IOW	GLN; 37	**MCH**; 2*	BRI	CGV	ATL; 13	RCH	DOV	KAN; 28	CAL; 2	CLT; 4	MEM	TEX; 7	PHO	HOM	20th	2403	
2010	Braun Racing	32	Toyota	DAY; 5	CAL; 8	LVS; 5	BRI	NSH	PHO	TEX	TAL; 9	RCH	DAR; 9	DOV	CLT	NSH	KEN	ROA	NHA	DAY	CHI	GTW	IRP	IOW	GLN	MCH	BRI	CGV	ATL	RCH	DOV	KAN	CAL	CLT	GTW	TEX	PHO	HOM	56th	733	
2011	Turner Motorsports	32	Chevy	DAY	PHO	LVS	BRI	CAL	TEX	TAL	NSH	RCH	DAR	DOV	IOW	CLT	CHI	MCH	ROA	DAY	KEN	NHA	NSH	IRP	IOW	GLN	CGV	BRI	ATL	RCH	CHI	DOV	KAN; 8	CLT; 10	TEX; 10	PHO	HOM		111th	0^{1}	
2012	Joe Gibbs Racing	20	Toyota	DAY	PHO	LVS	BRI	CAL	TEX	RCH	TAL	DAR	IOW	CLT	DOV	MCH	ROA	KEN	DAY	NHA	CHI	IND	IOW	GLN	CGV	BRI	ATL	RCH	CHI	KEN	DOV	CLT	KAN	TEX	PHO; 2	HOM			114th	0^{1}	
2013	Joe Gibbs Racing	20	Toyota	DAY; 19	PHO; 17	LVS; 3	BRI; 3	CAL; 34	TEX; 9	RCH; 4	TAL; 15	DAR; 3	CLT; 11	DOV; 2	IOW; 29	MCH; 33	ROA; 6	KEN; 4	DAY; 13	NHA; 2	CHI; 5	IND; 4	IOW; 3	GLN; 3	MOH; 5	BRI; 34	ATL; 15	RCH; 7	CHI; 6	KEN; 7	DOV; 4	KAN; 29	CLT; 31	TEX	PHO	HOM			10th	970	

^{*} Season still in progress
^{1} Ineligible for series points
^{2} Despite being ineligible for Cup Series points that season, Vickers was also penalized 50 Cup Series points at fall Richmond for his team's involvement in a race manipulation scheme.

==== Autozone West Series ====
NASCAR Autozone West Series results
Year	Team	No.	Make	1	2	3	4	5	6	7	8	9	10	11	12	NAWC	Pts	Ref
2006	Hendrick Motorsports	17	Chevy	PHO	PHO	S99	IRW	**SON**; 1*	DCS	IRW	EVG	S99	CAL	CTS	AMP	42nd	185	

=== 24 Hours of Le Mans results ===
Year	Team	Co-Drivers	Car	Class	Laps	Pos.	Class Pos.
2012	(Italy) AF Corse-Waltrip	(United States) Rob Kauffmann (Portugal) Rui Águas	Ferrari 458 Italia GT	LM GTE; Am	294	31st	6th

Sporting positions
Preceded by Greg Biffle	NASCAR Busch Series Champion; 2003	Succeeded by Martin Truex Jr.
