= 2003 UAW-GM Quality 500 =

31st race of the 2003 Winston Cup Series

Race details
- Race 31 of 36 in the 2003 NASCAR Winston Cup Series
- The 2003 UAW-GM Quality 500 program cover, with artwork by NASCAR artist Sam Bass. The program features a tribute to Winston. The painting is called "Tribute!"
- Date: October 11, 2003
- Official name: 44th Annual UAW-GM Quality 500
- Location: Concord, North Carolina, Lowe's Motor Speedway
- Course: Permanent racing facility
- Course length: 1.5 miles (2.41 km)
- Distance: 334 laps, 501 mi (806.281 km)
- Average speed: 142.871 miles per hour (229.929 km/h)
- Attendance: 160,000

Pole position
Driver	Ryan Newman	Penske Racing South
- Time: 28.930

Most laps led
Driver	Tony Stewart	Joe Gibbs Racing
- Laps: 149

Winner
No. 20	Tony Stewart	Joe Gibbs Racing

Television in the United States
- Network: NBC
- Announcers: Allen Bestwick, Benny Parsons, Wally Dallenbach Jr.

Radio in the United States
- Radio: Performance Racing Network

The 2003 UAW-GM Quality 500 was the 31st stock car race of the 2003 NASCAR Winston Cup Series season and the 44th iteration of the event. The race was held on Saturday, October 11, 2003, before a crowd of 160,000 in Concord, North Carolina, at Lowe's Motor Speedway, a 1.5 miles (2.4 km) permanent quad-oval. The race took the scheduled 334 laps to complete. At race's end, Tony Stewart, driving for Joe Gibbs Racing, would make a late race pass on Penske Racing South driver Ryan Newman with eight to go to win his 17th career NASCAR Winston Cup Series victory and his second and final win of the season. To fill out the podium, Ryan Newman and Hendrick Motorsports driver Jimmie Johnson would finish second and third, respectively.

== Background ==
The layout of Lowe's Motor Speedway, the venue where the race was held.

Lowe's Motor Speedway is a motorsports complex located in Concord, North Carolina, United States 13 miles from Charlotte, North Carolina. The complex features a 1.5 miles (2.4 km) quad oval track that hosts NASCAR racing including the prestigious Coca-Cola 600 on Memorial Day weekend and the NEXTEL All-Star Challenge, as well as the UAW-GM Quality 500. The speedway was built in 1959 by Bruton Smith and is considered the home track for NASCAR with many race teams located in the Charlotte area. The track is owned and operated by Speedway Motorsports Inc. (SMI) with Marcus G. Smith (son of Bruton Smith) as track president.

=== Entry list ===
- (R) denotes rookie driver.

#	Driver	Team	Make
0	Jason Leffler	Haas CNC Racing	Pontiac
1	John Andretti	Dale Earnhardt, Inc.	Chevrolet
01	Mike Skinner	MB2 Motorsports	Pontiac
2	Rusty Wallace	Penske Racing South	Dodge
02	Hermie Sadler	SCORE Motorsports	Chevrolet
4	Kevin Lepage	Morgan–McClure Motorsports	Pontiac
5	Terry Labonte	Hendrick Motorsports	Chevrolet
6	Mark Martin	Roush Racing	Ford
7	Jimmy Spencer	Ultra Motorsports	Dodge
8	Dale Earnhardt Jr.	Dale Earnhardt, Inc.	Chevrolet
9	Bill Elliott	Evernham Motorsports	Dodge
10	Johnny Benson Jr.	MB2 Motorsports	Pontiac
12	Ryan Newman	Penske Racing South	Dodge
14	Mark Green	A. J. Foyt Enterprises	Dodge
15	Michael Waltrip	Dale Earnhardt, Inc.	Chevrolet
16	Greg Biffle (R)	Roush Racing	Ford
17	Matt Kenseth	Roush Racing	Ford
18	Bobby Labonte	Joe Gibbs Racing	Chevrolet
19	Jeremy Mayfield	Evernham Motorsports	Dodge
20	Tony Stewart	Joe Gibbs Racing	Chevrolet
21	Ricky Rudd	Wood Brothers Racing	Ford
22	Ward Burton	Bill Davis Racing	Dodge
23	Kenny Wallace	Bill Davis Racing	Dodge
24	Jeff Gordon	Hendrick Motorsports	Chevrolet
25	Joe Nemechek	Hendrick Motorsports	Chevrolet
29	Kevin Harvick	Richard Childress Racing	Chevrolet
30	Steve Park	Richard Childress Racing	Chevrolet
31	Robby Gordon	Richard Childress Racing	Chevrolet
32	Ricky Craven	PPI Motorsports	Pontiac
37	Derrike Cope	Quest Motor Racing	Chevrolet
38	Elliott Sadler	Robert Yates Racing	Ford
40	Sterling Marlin	Chip Ganassi Racing	Dodge
41	Casey Mears (R)	Chip Ganassi Racing	Dodge
42	Jamie McMurray (R)	Chip Ganassi Racing	Dodge
43	Jeff Green	Petty Enterprises	Dodge
44	Christian Fittipaldi	Petty Enterprises	Dodge
45	Kyle Petty	Petty Enterprises	Dodge
48	Jimmie Johnson	Hendrick Motorsports	Chevrolet
49	Ken Schrader	BAM Racing	Dodge
54	Todd Bodine	BelCar Motorsports	Ford
55	Jeff Fultz	Jasper Motorsports	Ford
60	Brian Vickers	Hendrick Motorsports	Chevrolet
74	Tony Raines	BACE Motorsports	Chevrolet
77	Dave Blaney	Jasper Motorsports	Ford
88	Dale Jarrett	Robert Yates Racing	Ford
97	Kurt Busch	Roush Racing	Ford
99	Jeff Burton	Roush Racing	Ford
Official entry list

== Practice ==
Originally, three practice sessions were planned to be held, with one on Thursday, October 9, and two on Friday, October 10. However, due to rain, the second session on Saturday was cancelled.

=== First practice ===
The first practice session was held on Thursday, October 9, at 2:20 p.m. EST. The session would last for two hours. Ryan Newman, driving for Penske Racing South, would set the fastest time in the session, with a lap of 29.128 and an average speed of 185.389 miles per hour (298.355 km/h).

Pos.	#	Driver	Team	Make	Time	Speed
1	12	Ryan Newman	Penske Racing South	Dodge	29.128	185.389
2	01	Mike Skinner	MB2 Motorsports	Pontiac	29.223	184.786
3	19	Jeremy Mayfield	Evernham Motorsports	Dodge	29.313	184.219
Full first practice results

=== Second and final practice ===
The final practice session, sometimes referred to as Happy Hour, was held on Friday, October 10, at 4:00 p.m. EST. The session would last for 45 minutes. Tony Stewart, driving for Joe Gibbs Racing, would set the fastest time in the session, with a lap of 29.690 and an average speed of 181.879 miles per hour (292.706 km/h).

Pos.	#	Driver	Team	Make	Time	Speed
1	20	Tony Stewart	Joe Gibbs Racing	Chevrolet	29.690	181.879
2	48	Jimmie Johnson	Hendrick Motorsports	Chevrolet	29.859	180.850
3	31	Robby Gordon	Richard Childress Racing	Chevrolet	29.904	180.578
Full Happy Hour practice results

== Qualifying ==
Qualifying was held on Thursday, October 9, at 7:05 p.m. EST. Each driver would have two laps to set a fastest time; the fastest of the two would count as their official qualifying lap. Positions 1-36 would be decided on time, while positions 37-43 would be based on provisionals. Six spots are awarded by the use of provisionals based on owner's points. The seventh is awarded to a past champion who has not otherwise qualified for the race. If no past champ needs the provisional, the next team in the owner points will be awarded a provisional.

Ryan Newman, driving for Penske Racing South, would win the pole, setting a time of 28.930 and an average speed of 186.657 miles per hour (300.395 km/h).

Four drivers would fail to qualify: Ken Schrader, Hermie Sadler, Mark Green, and Jeff Fultz.

=== Full qualifying results ===
Pos.	#	Driver	Team	Make	Time	Speed
1	12	Ryan Newman	Penske Racing South	Dodge	28.930	186.657
2	24	Jeff Gordon	Hendrick Motorsports	Chevrolet	29.000	186.207
3	48	Jimmie Johnson	Hendrick Motorsports	Chevrolet	29.111	185.497
4	9	Bill Elliott	Evernham Motorsports	Dodge	29.162	185.173
5	4	Kevin Lepage	Morgan–McClure Motorsports	Pontiac	29.205	184.900
6	20	Tony Stewart	Joe Gibbs Racing	Chevrolet	29.207	184.887
7	38	Elliott Sadler	Robert Yates Racing	Ford	29.211	184.862
8	54	Todd Bodine	BelCar Motorsports	Ford	29.226	184.767
9	29	Kevin Harvick	Richard Childress Racing	Chevrolet	29.229	184.748
10	01	Mike Skinner	MB2 Motorsports	Pontiac	29.246	184.641
11	8	Dale Earnhardt Jr.	Dale Earnhardt, Inc.	Chevrolet	29.274	184.464
12	18	Bobby Labonte	Joe Gibbs Racing	Chevrolet	29.274	184.464
13	32	Ricky Craven	PPI Motorsports	Pontiac	29.299	184.307
14	2	Rusty Wallace	Penske Racing South	Dodge	29.327	184.131
15	31	Robby Gordon	Richard Childress Racing	Chevrolet	29.388	183.749
16	88	Dale Jarrett	Robert Yates Racing	Ford	29.389	183.742
17	97	Kurt Busch	Roush Racing	Ford	29.425	183.517
18	23	Kenny Wallace	Bill Davis Racing	Dodge	29.430	183.486
19	42	Jamie McMurray (R)	Chip Ganassi Racing	Dodge	29.436	183.449
20	60	Brian Vickers	Hendrick Motorsports	Chevrolet	29.448	183.374
21	5	Terry Labonte	Hendrick Motorsports	Chevrolet	29.460	183.299
22	16	Greg Biffle (R)	Roush Racing	Ford	29.470	183.237
23	10	Johnny Benson Jr.	MBV Motorsports	Pontiac	29.479	183.181
24	0	Jason Leffler	Haas CNC Racing	Pontiac	29.480	183.175
25	7	Jimmy Spencer	Ultra Motorsports	Dodge	29.501	183.045
26	30	Steve Park	Richard Childress Racing	Chevrolet	29.513	182.970
27	6	Mark Martin	Roush Racing	Ford	29.523	182.908
28	41	Casey Mears (R)	Chip Ganassi Racing	Dodge	29.526	182.890
29	17	Matt Kenseth	Roush Racing	Ford	29.528	182.877
30	15	Michael Waltrip	Dale Earnhardt, Inc.	Chevrolet	29.539	182.809
31	44	Christian Fittipaldi	Petty Enterprises	Dodge	29.551	182.735
32	19	Jeremy Mayfield	Evernham Motorsports	Dodge	29.575	182.587
33	40	Sterling Marlin	Chip Ganassi Racing	Dodge	29.576	182.581
34	77	Dave Blaney	Jasper Motorsports	Ford	29.590	182.494
35	74	Tony Raines	BACE Motorsports	Chevrolet	29.594	182.469
36	43	Jeff Green	Petty Enterprises	Dodge	29.625	182.279
Provisionals
37	99	Jeff Burton	Roush Racing	Ford	29.651	182.119
38	22	Ward Burton	Bill Davis Racing	Dodge	29.782	181.318
39	21	Ricky Rudd	Wood Brothers Racing	Ford	29.815	181.117
40	25	Joe Nemechek	Hendrick Motorsports	Chevrolet	30.018	179.892
41	1	John Andretti	Dale Earnhardt, Inc.	Chevrolet	29.736	181.598
42	45	Kyle Petty	Petty Enterprises	Dodge	29.837	180.983
43	37	Derrike Cope	Quest Motor Racing	Chevrolet	29.927	180.439
Failed to qualify
44	49	Ken Schrader	BAM Racing	Dodge	29.721	181.690
45	02	Hermie Sadler	SCORE Motorsports	Chevrolet	29.775	181.360
46	14	Mark Green	A. J. Foyt Enterprises	Dodge	29.852	180.892
47	55	Jeff Fultz	Jasper Motorsports	Ford	30.019	179.886
Official qualifying results

== Race results ==
Fin	St	#	Driver	Team	Make	Laps	Led	Status	Pts	Winnings
1	6	20	Tony Stewart	Joe Gibbs Racing	Chevrolet	334	149	running	185	$312,478
2	1	12	Ryan Newman	Penske Racing South	Dodge	334	46	running	175	$164,425
3	3	48	Jimmie Johnson	Hendrick Motorsports	Chevrolet	334	104	running	170	$144,550
4	4	9	Bill Elliott	Evernham Motorsports	Dodge	334	27	running	165	$125,233
5	2	24	Jeff Gordon	Hendrick Motorsports	Chevrolet	334	0	running	155	$123,578
6	12	18	Bobby Labonte	Joe Gibbs Racing	Chevrolet	334	4	running	155	$110,258
7	19	42	Jamie McMurray (R)	Chip Ganassi Racing	Dodge	334	1	running	151	$67,225
8	29	17	Matt Kenseth	Roush Racing	Ford	334	0	running	142	$82,425
9	11	8	Dale Earnhardt Jr.	Dale Earnhardt, Inc.	Chevrolet	334	2	running	143	$98,217
10	9	29	Kevin Harvick	Richard Childress Racing	Chevrolet	334	0	running	134	$97,853
11	27	6	Mark Martin	Roush Racing	Ford	334	0	running	130	$93,108
12	32	19	Jeremy Mayfield	Evernham Motorsports	Dodge	334	0	running	127	$65,125
13	14	2	Rusty Wallace	Penske Racing South	Dodge	334	0	running	124	$90,842
14	30	15	Michael Waltrip	Dale Earnhardt, Inc.	Chevrolet	334	0	running	121	$68,950
15	33	40	Sterling Marlin	Chip Ganassi Racing	Dodge	334	0	running	118	$96,600
16	23	10	Johnny Benson Jr.	MBV Motorsports	Pontiac	333	0	running	115	$80,400
17	22	16	Greg Biffle (R)	Roush Racing	Ford	333	0	running	112	$53,000
18	21	5	Terry Labonte	Hendrick Motorsports	Chevrolet	333	0	running	109	$78,406
19	13	32	Ricky Craven	PPI Motorsports	Pontiac	333	0	running	106	$76,850
20	37	99	Jeff Burton	Roush Racing	Ford	332	0	running	103	$87,167
21	5	4	Kevin Lepage	Morgan–McClure Motorsports	Pontiac	332	0	running	100	$64,050
22	16	88	Dale Jarrett	Robert Yates Racing	Ford	331	0	running	97	$93,053
23	39	21	Ricky Rudd	Wood Brothers Racing	Ford	331	0	running	94	$71,475
24	34	77	Dave Blaney	Jasper Motorsports	Ford	331	0	running	91	$69,530
25	35	74	Tony Raines	BACE Motorsports	Chevrolet	331	0	running	88	$50,200
26	25	7	Jimmy Spencer	Ultra Motorsports	Dodge	331	0	running	85	$57,889
27	36	43	Jeff Green	Petty Enterprises	Dodge	331	0	running	82	$84,963
28	38	22	Ward Burton	Bill Davis Racing	Dodge	331	0	running	79	$81,941
29	8	54	Todd Bodine	BelCar Motorsports	Ford	331	0	running	76	$49,200
30	41	1	John Andretti	Dale Earnhardt, Inc.	Chevrolet	331	0	running	73	$74,262
31	40	25	Joe Nemechek	Hendrick Motorsports	Chevrolet	330	0	running	70	$47,950
32	18	23	Kenny Wallace	Bill Davis Racing	Dodge	330	0	running	67	$45,325
33	20	60	Brian Vickers	Hendrick Motorsports	Chevrolet	329	0	running	64	$46,175
34	31	44	Christian Fittipaldi	Petty Enterprises	Dodge	329	0	running	61	$45,225
35	24	0	Jason Leffler	Haas CNC Racing	Pontiac	325	0	running	58	$45,150
36	26	30	Steve Park	Richard Childress Racing	Chevrolet	310	0	running	55	$53,065
37	43	37	Derrike Cope	Quest Motor Racing	Chevrolet	297	0	running	52	$45,020
38	15	31	Robby Gordon	Richard Childress Racing	Chevrolet	293	0	running	49	$70,162
39	10	01	Mike Skinner	MB2 Motorsports	Pontiac	275	1	running	51	$45,440
40	42	45	Kyle Petty	Petty Enterprises	Dodge	271	0	suspension	43	$52,905
41	17	97	Kurt Busch	Roush Racing	Ford	229	0	crash	40	$64,870
42	28	41	Casey Mears (R)	Chip Ganassi Racing	Dodge	217	0	engine	37	$52,830
43	7	38	Elliott Sadler	Robert Yates Racing	Ford	204	0	crash	34	$78,999
Failed to qualify
44		49	Ken Schrader	BAM Racing	Dodge					
45		02	Hermie Sadler	SCORE Motorsports	Chevrolet					
46		14	Mark Green	A. J. Foyt Enterprises	Dodge					
47		55	Jeff Fultz	Jasper Motorsports	Ford					
Official race results

Previous race: 2003 Banquet 400	NASCAR Winston Cup Series; 2003 season	Next race: 2003 Subway 500
