= 2005 Dickies 500 =

Race details
- Race 34 of 36 in the 2005 NASCAR Nextel Cup Series
- Simple line diagram of Texas Motor Speedway track layout
- Date: November 6, 2005
- Location: Texas Motor Speedway, Fort Worth, Texas
- Course: Permanent racing facility
- Course length: 1.5 miles (2.4 km)
- Distance: 334 laps, 501 mi (806.28 km)
- Weather: Temperatures reaching up to 81 °F (27 °C); wind speeds up to 12 miles per hour (19 km/h)
- Average speed: 151.005 miles per hour (243.019 km/h)

Pole position
Driver	Ryan Newman	Penske Racing

Most laps led
Driver	Matt Kenseth	Roush Racing
- Laps: 149

Winner
No. 99	Carl Edwards	Roush Racing

Television in the United States
- Network: NBC
- Announcers: Bill Weber, Benny Parsons, Wally Dallenbach Jr.
- Nielsen ratings: 5.1/10

The 2005 Dickies 500 was a NASCAR Nextel Cup Series stock car race, which was held on November 6, 2005, at Texas Motor Speedway (TMS) in Fort Worth, Texas. It was the inaugural running of the Dickies 500 after being created for the 2005 season.

== Summary ==
The race was the 34th of the 2005 NASCAR Nextel Cup Series season, and the eighth race in the 2005 Chase for the Nextel Cup, and was the first race to be run under the lights at TMS. Track president Eddie Gossage later announced that the total purse money for the race was US$6,815,880, then the largest in Chase history, and the fourth largest during the 2005 season, trailing the Daytona 500, the Allstate 400 at the Brickyard, and the Samsung/RadioShack 500.

The pole position was held by Penske Racing's Ryan Newman, and was won by Carl Edwards of Roush Racing. The race was created as a result of the Ferko lawsuit, which took out the Southern 500 at Darlington Raceway, along with the Subway 400 at North Carolina Speedway. The race featured six cautions, which at the time was the fewest at Texas Motor Speedway in a Nextel Cup race, and the 151.005 miles per hour (243.019 km/h) average speed which was also at the time the highest at the track in a Cup race.

Pole-sitter Ryan Newman was forced to start in the back after his car crashed on the second qualifying lap, and had to drive a backup car, and Matt Kenseth took over the pole position. Following the first caution flag, Greg Biffle passed Kenseth, but had to pit due to a loose wheel. Kenseth would dominate much of the race, leading a race-high 149 laps. Later in the race, with 11 laps remaining, Mark Martin did not change tires, and led on the restart. However, with two laps left, Carl Edwards, on newer tires, passed Martin and held him and Kenseth off for the victory by a margin of .584 seconds.

=== Top 20 finishers ===
1. Kurt Busch
2. Martin Truex Jr.
3. Matt Kenseth
4. Casey Mears
5. Jimmie Johnson
6. Tony Stewart
7. Denny Hamlin
8. Dale Earnhardt Jr.
9. Elliott Sadler
10. Mark Martin
11. Jamie McMurray
12. Dale Jarrett
13. Ricky Rudd
14. Jeff Gordon
15. Kyle Busch
16. Kevin Harvick
17. Mike Bliss
18. Jeff Green
19. Brian Vickers
20. Greg Biffle

== Standings after the race ==
Pos	Driver	Points
1	Tony Stewart	6255
2	Jimmie Johnson	6217
3	Carl Edwards	6178
4	Greg Biffle	6133
5	Mark Martin	6132
6	Matt Kenseth	6130
7	Ryan Newman	6081
8	Kurt Busch	5974
9	Rusty Wallace	5940
10	Jeremy Mayfield	5848

Previous race: 2005 Bass Pro Shops MBNA 500	Nextel Cup Series; 2005 season	Next race: 2005 Checker Auto Parts 500
