= 2005 Checker Auto Parts 500 =

Car race

Race details
- Race 35 of 36 in the 2005 NASCAR Nextel Cup Series
- Date: November 13, 2005
- Official name: Checker Auto Parts 500
- Location: Phoenix International Raceway, Avondale, Arizona
- Course: Permanent racing facility
- Course length: 1.000 miles (1.609 km)
- Distance: 312 laps, 312 mi (502.115 km)
- Average speed: 102.641 miles per hour (165.185 km/h)

Pole position
Driver	Denny Hamlin	Joe Gibbs Racing
- Time: 26.831

Most laps led
Driver	Greg Biffle	Roush Racing
- Laps: 189

Winner
No. 5	Kyle Busch	Hendrick Motorsports

Television in the United States
- Network: NBC
- Announcers: Bill Weber, Wally Dallenbach, and Benny Parsons

The 2005 Checker Auto Parts 500 was a NASCAR Nextel Cup Series stock car race held on November 13, 2005 at Phoenix International Raceway in Avondale, Arizona. Contested over 312 laps on the 1-mile (1.6-kilometre) asphalt oval, it was the thirty-fifth race of the 2005 NASCAR Nextel Cup Series. Kyle Busch of Hendrick Motorsports won the race.

== Background ==
Phoenix International Raceway – also known as PIR – is a 1-mile (1.6-kilometre), low-banked tri-oval race track located in Avondale, Arizona. It is named after the nearby metropolitan area of Phoenix. The motorsport track opened in 1964 and currently hosts two NASCAR race weekends annually. PIR has also hosted the IndyCar Series, CART, USAC and the Rolex Sports Car Series. The raceway is currently owned and operated by International Speedway Corporation.

The raceway was originally constructed with a 2.5-mile (4.0-kilometre) road course that ran both inside and outside of the main tri-oval. In 1991 the track was reconfigured with the current 1.51-mile (2.43-kilometre) interior layout. Lights were installed around the track in 2004 following the addition of a second annual NASCAR race weekend.

== Summary ==
Denny Hamlin, in his sixth career Nextel Cup Series start, took his first pole position for Joe Gibbs Racing. The race was surrounded by controversy when defending champion Kurt Busch was cited for reckless driving and was reported by a cop to have "had the whiff of alcohol," although he was below the legal limit of .008 in Arizona, with a recorded value of .0018. Due to his actions, he was suspended by Roush Racing for the rest of the season, and Kenny Wallace took the wheel of the No. 97 car. Ironically, his brother Kyle won the race, and in victory lane, he criticized the media for their handling of the case.

Jerry Robertson made his only NASCAR Nextel Cup Series start in this event.

== Top 10 results ==
Pos	No.	Driver	Team	Manufacturer
1	5	Kyle Busch	Hendrick Motorsports	Chevrolet
2	16	Greg Biffle	Roush Racing	Ford
3	24	Jeff Gordon	Hendrick Motorsports	Chevrolet
4	20	Tony Stewart	Joe Gibbs Racing	Chevrolet
5	18	Bobby Labonte	Joe Gibbs Racing	Chevrolet
6	99	Carl Edwards	Roush Racing	Ford
7	48	Jimmie Johnson	Hendrick Motorsports	Chevrolet
8	7	Robby Gordon	Robby Gordon Motorsports	Chevrolet
9	88	Dale Jarrett	Robert Yates Racing	Ford
10	77	Travis Kvapil	Penske-Jasper Racing	Dodge

== Race statistics ==
- Time of race: 3:02:23
- Average speed: 102.641 miles per hour (165.185 km/h)
- Pole speed: 134.173 miles per hour (215.931 km/h)
- Cautions: 9 for 44 laps
- Margin of Victory: 0.609 seconds
- Lead changes: 10
- Percent of race run under caution: 14.1%
- Average green flag run: 26.8 laps

Preceded by 2005 Dickies 500	NASCAR Nextel Cup Series Season; 2005	Succeeded by 2005 Ford 400
