= 2003 Chevy Rock & Roll 400 =

26th race of the 2003 NASCAR Winston Cup Series

Race details
- Race 26 of 36 in the 2003 NASCAR Winston Cup Series
- The 2003 Chevy Rock & Roll 400 program cover.
- Date: September 6, 2003
- Official name: 46th Annual Chevy Rock & Roll 400
- Location: Richmond, Virginia, Richmond International Raceway
- Course: Permanent racing facility
- Course length: 0.75 miles (1.21 km)
- Distance: 400 laps, 300 mi (482.803 km)
- Scheduled distance: 400 laps, 300 mi (482.803 km)
- Average speed: 94.945 miles per hour (152.799 km/h)
- Attendance: 105,000

Pole position
Driver	Mike Skinner	MB2 Motorsports
- Time: 21.464

Most laps led
Driver	Jeff Gordon	Hendrick Motorsports
- Laps: 126

Winner
No. 12	Ryan Newman	Penske Racing South

Television in the United States
- Network: TNT
- Announcers: Allen Bestwick, Benny Parsons, Wally Dallenbach Jr.

Radio in the United States
- Radio: Motor Racing Network

The 2003 Chevy Rock & Roll 400 was the 26th stock car race of the 2003 NASCAR Winston Cup Series season and the 46th iteration of the event. The race was held on Saturday, September 6, 2003, before a crowd of 105,000 in Richmond, Virginia, at Richmond International Raceway, a 0.75 miles (1.21 km) D-shaped oval. The race took the scheduled 400 laps to complete. At race's end, Penske Racing South driver Ryan Newman would hold off the field on a late restart with four to go to win his seventh career NASCAR Winston Cup Series win and his sixth win of the season. To fill out the podium, Jeremy Mayfield of Evernham Motorsports and Ricky Rudd of Wood Brothers Racing would finish second and third, respectively.

== Background ==
The layout of Richmond International Raceway, the venue where the race was at.

Richmond International Raceway (RIR) is a 3/4-mile (1.2 km), D-shaped, asphalt race track located just outside Richmond, Virginia in Henrico County. It hosts the Monster Energy NASCAR Cup Series and Xfinity Series. Known as "America's premier short track", it formerly hosted a NASCAR Camping World Truck Series race, an IndyCar Series race, and two USAC sprint car races.

=== Entry list ===
#	Driver	Team	Make
0	Jason Leffler	Haas CNC Racing	Pontiac
1	John Andretti	Dale Earnhardt, Inc.	Chevrolet
01	Mike Skinner	MB2 Motorsports	Pontiac
2	Rusty Wallace	Penske Racing South	Dodge
02	Hermie Sadler	SCORE Motorsports	Pontiac
4	Johnny Sauter	Morgan–McClure Motorsports	Pontiac
5	Terry Labonte	Hendrick Motorsports	Chevrolet
6	Mark Martin	Roush Racing	Ford
7	Jimmy Spencer	Ultra Motorsports	Dodge
8	Dale Earnhardt Jr.	Dale Earnhardt, Inc.	Chevrolet
9	Bill Elliott	Evernham Motorsports	Dodge
09	Mike Wallace	Phoenix Racing	Dodge
10	Johnny Benson Jr.	MB2 Motorsports	Pontiac
11	Brett Bodine*	Brett Bodine Racing	Ford
12	Ryan Newman	Penske Racing South	Dodge
15	Michael Waltrip	Dale Earnhardt, Inc.	Chevrolet
16	Greg Biffle	Roush Racing	Ford
17	Matt Kenseth	Roush Racing	Ford
18	Bobby Labonte	Joe Gibbs Racing	Chevrolet
19	Jeremy Mayfield	Evernham Motorsports	Dodge
20	Tony Stewart	Joe Gibbs Racing	Chevrolet
21	Ricky Rudd	Wood Brothers Racing	Ford
22	Ward Burton	Bill Davis Racing	Dodge
23	Kenny Wallace	Bill Davis Racing	Dodge
24	Jeff Gordon	Hendrick Motorsports	Chevrolet
25	Joe Nemechek	Hendrick Motorsports	Chevrolet
29	Kevin Harvick	Richard Childress Racing	Chevrolet
30	Steve Park	Richard Childress Racing	Chevrolet
31	Robby Gordon	Richard Childress Racing	Chevrolet
32	Ricky Craven	PPI Motorsports	Pontiac
37	Derrike Cope*	Quest Motor Racing	Chevrolet
38	Elliott Sadler	Robert Yates Racing	Ford
40	Sterling Marlin	Chip Ganassi Racing	Dodge
41	Casey Mears	Chip Ganassi Racing	Dodge
42	Jamie McMurray	Chip Ganassi Racing	Dodge
43	Christian Fittipaldi	Petty Enterprises	Dodge
45	Kyle Petty	Petty Enterprises	Dodge
48	Jimmie Johnson	Hendrick Motorsports	Chevrolet
49	Ken Schrader	BAM Racing	Dodge
50	Larry Foyt	A. J. Foyt Enterprises	Dodge
54	Todd Bodine	BelCar Motorsports	Ford
74	Tony Raines	BACE Motorsports	Chevrolet
77	Dave Blaney	Jasper Motorsports	Ford
79	Billy Bigley	Arnold Motorsports	Dodge
88	Dale Jarrett	Robert Yates Racing	Ford
97	Kurt Busch	Roush Racing	Ford
99	Jeff Burton	Roush Racing	Ford
Official entry list

== Practice ==
=== First practice ===
The first practice session was held on Friday, September 5, at 11:20 AM EST, and would last for two hours. Tony Stewart of Joe Gibbs Racing would set the fastest time in the session, with a lap of 21.398 and an average speed of 126.180 miles per hour (203.067 km/h).

Pos.	#	Driver	Team	Make	Time	Speed
1	20	Tony Stewart	Joe Gibbs Racing	Chevrolet	21.398	126.180
2	01	Mike Skinner	MB2 Motorsports	Pontiac	21.449	125.880
3	2	Rusty Wallace	Penske Racing South	Dodge	21.450	125.874
Full first practice results

=== Second practice ===
The second practice session was held on Friday, September 5, at 4:45 PM EST, and would last for 45 minutes. Todd Bodine of BelCar Racing would set the fastest time in the session, with a lap of 21.670 and an average speed of 124.596 miles per hour (200.518 km/h).

Pos.	#	Driver	Team	Make	Time	Speed
1	54	Todd Bodine	BelCar Racing	Ford	21.670	124.596
2	01	Mike Skinner	MB2 Motorsports	Pontiac	21.716	124.332
3	7	Jimmy Spencer	Ultra Motorsports	Dodge	21.720	124.309
Full second practice results

=== Third and final practice ===
The third and final practice session, sometimes referred to as Happy Hour, was held on Friday, September 5, at 6:10 PM EST, and would last for 45 minutes. Jeff Burton of Roush Racing would set the fastest time in the session, with a lap of 21.599 and an average speed of 125.006 miles per hour (201.178 km/h).

Pos.	#	Driver	Team	Make	Time	Speed
1	99	Jeff Burton	Roush Racing	Ford	21.599	125.006
2	24	Jeff Gordon	Hendrick Motorsports	Chevrolet	21.705	124.395
3	48	Jimmie Johnson	Hendrick Motorsports	Chevrolet	21.775	123.995
Full Happy Hour practice results

== Qualifying ==
Qualifying was held on Friday, September 5, at 3:05 PM EST. Each driver would have two laps to set a fastest time; the fastest of the two would count as their official qualifying lap. Positions 1-36 would be decided on time, while positions 37-43 would be based on provisionals. Six spots are awarded by the use of provisionals based on owner's points. The seventh is awarded to a past champion who has not otherwise qualified for the race. If no past champ needs the provisional, the next team in the owner points will be awarded a provisional.

Mike Skinner of MB2 Motorsports would win the pole, setting a time of 21.464 and an average speed of 125.792 miles per hour (202.443 km/h).

Larry Foyt and Billy Bigley would fail to qualify.

=== Full qualifying results ===
Pos.	#	Driver	Team	Make	Time	Speed
1	01	Mike Skinner	MB2 Motorsports	Pontiac	21.464	125.792
2	16	Greg Biffle	Roush Racing	Ford	21.489	125.646
3	6	Mark Martin	Roush Racing	Ford	21.499	125.587
4	12	Ryan Newman	Penske Racing South	Dodge	21.536	125.371
5	24	Jeff Gordon	Hendrick Motorsports	Chevrolet	21.594	125.035
6	40	Sterling Marlin	Chip Ganassi Racing	Dodge	21.610	124.942
7	99	Jeff Burton	Roush Racing	Ford	21.611	124.936
8	22	Ward Burton	Bill Davis Racing	Dodge	21.624	124.861
9	10	Johnny Benson Jr.	MB2 Motorsports	Pontiac	21.643	124.752
10	45	Kyle Petty	Petty Enterprises	Dodge	21.643	124.752
11	25	Joe Nemechek	Hendrick Motorsports	Chevrolet	21.671	124.590
12	54	Todd Bodine	BelCar Racing	Ford	21.674	124.573
13	8	Dale Earnhardt Jr.	Dale Earnhardt, Inc.	Chevrolet	21.704	124.401
14	20	Tony Stewart	Joe Gibbs Racing	Chevrolet	21.709	124.372
15	9	Bill Elliott	Evernham Motorsports	Dodge	21.731	124.246
16	18	Bobby Labonte	Joe Gibbs Racing	Chevrolet	21.733	124.235
17	2	Rusty Wallace	Penske Racing South	Dodge	21.734	124.229
18	17	Matt Kenseth	Roush Racing	Ford	21.745	124.166
19	21	Ricky Rudd	Wood Brothers Racing	Ford	21.753	124.121
20	74	Tony Raines	BACE Motorsports	Chevrolet	21.757	124.098
21	31	Robby Gordon	Richard Childress Racing	Chevrolet	21.781	123.961
22	7	Jimmy Spencer	Ultra Motorsports	Dodge	21.794	123.887
23	19	Jeremy Mayfield	Evernham Motorsports	Dodge	21.795	123.882
24	1	John Andretti	Dale Earnhardt, Inc.	Chevrolet	21.803	123.836
25	97	Kurt Busch	Roush Racing	Ford	21.830	123.683
26	48	Jimmie Johnson	Hendrick Motorsports	Chevrolet	21.838	123.638
27	49	Ken Schrader	BAM Racing	Dodge	21.838	123.638
28	29	Kevin Harvick	Richard Childress Racing	Chevrolet	21.845	123.598
29	42	Jamie McMurray	Chip Ganassi Racing	Dodge	21.849	123.575
30	38	Elliott Sadler	Robert Yates Racing	Ford	21.871	123.451
31	41	Casey Mears	Chip Ganassi Racing	Dodge	21.874	123.434
32	5	Terry Labonte	Hendrick Motorsports	Chevrolet	21.896	123.310
33	15	Michael Waltrip	Dale Earnhardt, Inc.	Chevrolet	21.922	123.164
34	23	Kenny Wallace	Bill Davis Racing	Dodge	21.938	123.074
35	32	Ricky Craven	PPI Motorsports	Pontiac	21.939	123.068
36	4	Johnny Sauter	Morgan–McClure Motorsports	Pontiac	21.949	123.012
Provisionals
37	88	Dale Jarrett	Robert Yates Racing	Ford	22.014	122.649
38	77	Dave Blaney	Jasper Motorsports	Ford	21.953	122.990
39	30	Steve Park	Richard Childress Racing	Chevrolet	22.005	122.699
40	0	Jason Leffler	Haas CNC Racing	Pontiac	22.165	121.814
41	43	Christian Fittipaldi	Petty Enterprises	Dodge	22.396	120.557
42	09	Mike Wallace	Phoenix Racing	Dodge	22.142	121.940
43	02	Hermie Sadler	SCORE Motorsports	Chevrolet	21.985	122.811
Failed to qualify or withdrew
44	50	Larry Foyt	A. J. Foyt Enterprises	Dodge	22.172	121.775
45	79	Billy Bigley	Arnold Motorsports	Dodge	22.269	121.245
WD	11	Brett Bodine	Brett Bodine Racing	Ford	—	—
WD	37	Derrike Cope	Quest Motor Racing	Chevrolet	—	—
Official qualifying results

== Post-race conflict ==
This race was notable for the post-race conflict between veteran Ricky Rudd and 3rd year Winston Cup driver Kevin Harvick. With 8 laps to go with Harvick running 2nd and Rudd running 3rd, Rudd got into the back of Harvick heading into turn 1. Harvick's car got sideways for a bit and eventually snapped around on him and crashed into the outside wall in turn 1 bringing out the 14th and final caution of the race. Once the race concluded, Rudd had finished 3rd which meant Rudd went over to pit road while the others who did not finish in the top 5 went to their haulers behind pit road. Harvick, who finished 16th, knew that Rudd had finished in the top 5 and went to pit road and pulled up alongside his car. Both crews of Harvick and Rudd came running out to their drivers. Rudd came halfway out of his car while Harvick got out of his car with the help of his crew and the two began to yell back and forth at each other with NASCAR officials yelling at Harvick to get off of the top of his car. Harvick went down from Rudd's car with one of his crew members holding him back while another of Havick's crew members behind him jumped up in the air and landed on Rudd's hood damaging his car. Harvick got separated from Rudd and began to walk away. As he was walking away, Harvick took his HANS device and threw it at Rudd's direction landing on top of Rudd's roof. Rudd took the device and threw it back at Harvick. Harvick said in his interview that "Ricky Rudd took a goddamn cheap shot at us. And if he's gonna take a cheap shot, he's going to get one back I promise you that." Rudd said that Harvick braked a little harder than he thought he would and said that the damage to his car from Harvick's crew was unnecessary. He finished his interview by saying "I couldn’t hear him. He’s got that little yap-yap mouth. I couldn’t tell what he was saying."

== Race results ==
Fin	St	#	Driver	Team	Make	Laps	Led	Status	Pts	Winnings
1	4	12	Ryan Newman	Penske Racing South	Dodge	400	125	running	180	$160,970
2	23	19	Jeremy Mayfield	Evernham Motorsports	Dodge	400	0	running	170	$136,365
3	19	21	Ricky Rudd	Wood Brothers Racing	Ford	400	0	running	165	$104,130
4	7	99	Jeff Burton	Roush Racing	Ford	400	5	running	165	$116,897
5	17	2	Rusty Wallace	Penske Racing South	Dodge	400	0	running	155	$99,047
6	16	18	Bobby Labonte	Joe Gibbs Racing	Chevrolet	400	5	running	155	$104,513
7	18	17	Matt Kenseth	Roush Racing	Ford	400	0	running	146	$75,230
8	32	5	Terry Labonte	Hendrick Motorsports	Chevrolet	400	10	running	147	$83,161
9	9	10	Johnny Benson Jr.	MB2 Motorsports	Pontiac	400	0	running	138	$83,455
10	5	24	Jeff Gordon	Hendrick Motorsports	Chevrolet	400	126	running	144	$102,333
11	26	48	Jimmie Johnson	Hendrick Motorsports	Chevrolet	400	0	running	130	$70,605
12	42	09	Mike Wallace	Phoenix Racing	Dodge	400	7	running	132	$56,290
13	3	6	Mark Martin	Roush Racing	Ford	400	1	running	129	$89,463
14	24	1	John Andretti	Dale Earnhardt, Inc.	Chevrolet	400	0	running	121	$76,917
15	8	22	Ward Burton	Bill Davis Racing	Dodge	400	0	running	118	$88,811
16	28	29	Kevin Harvick	Richard Childress Racing	Chevrolet	400	23	running	120	$89,383
17	13	8	Dale Earnhardt Jr.	Dale Earnhardt, Inc.	Chevrolet	399	76	running	117	$105,522
18	1	01	Mike Skinner	MB2 Motorsports	Pontiac	399	0	running	109	$73,155
19	29	42	Jamie McMurray	Chip Ganassi Racing	Dodge	399	0	running	106	$53,930
20	2	16	Greg Biffle	Roush Racing	Ford	399	2	running	108	$54,680
21	37	88	Dale Jarrett	Robert Yates Racing	Ford	399	0	running	100	$94,333
22	6	40	Sterling Marlin	Chip Ganassi Racing	Dodge	399	1	running	102	$92,430
23	34	23	Kenny Wallace	Bill Davis Racing	Dodge	399	0	running	94	$65,555
24	25	97	Kurt Busch	Roush Racing	Ford	398	0	running	91	$78,605
25	27	49	Ken Schrader	BAM Racing	Dodge	398	0	running	88	$51,655
26	11	25	Joe Nemechek	Hendrick Motorsports	Chevrolet	397	0	running	85	$51,030
27	14	20	Tony Stewart	Joe Gibbs Racing	Chevrolet	397	0	running	82	$100,283
28	40	0	Jason Leffler	Haas CNC Racing	Pontiac	397	19	running	84	$50,680
29	21	31	Robby Gordon	Richard Childress Racing	Chevrolet	397	0	running	76	$75,647
30	35	32	Ricky Craven	PPI Motorsports	Pontiac	396	0	running	73	$67,189
31	39	30	Steve Park	Richard Childress Racing	Chevrolet	394	0	running	70	$57,765
32	33	15	Michael Waltrip	Dale Earnhardt, Inc.	Chevrolet	388	0	running	67	$65,230
33	38	77	Dave Blaney	Jasper Motorsports	Ford	377	0	running	64	$56,100
34	10	45	Kyle Petty	Petty Enterprises	Dodge	373	0	running	61	$55,135
35	20	74	Tony Raines	BACE Motorsports	Chevrolet	360	0	running	58	$47,100
36	22	7	Jimmy Spencer	Ultra Motorsports	Dodge	324	0	engine	55	$47,065
37	15	9	Bill Elliott	Evernham Motorsports	Dodge	302	0	running	52	$85,863
38	36	4	Johnny Sauter	Morgan–McClure Motorsports	Pontiac	291	0	running	49	$46,995
39	30	38	Elliott Sadler	Robert Yates Racing	Ford	280	0	crash	46	$81,195
40	43	02	Hermie Sadler	SCORE Motorsports	Chevrolet	266	0	crash	43	$46,885
41	31	41	Casey Mears	Chip Ganassi Racing	Dodge	247	0	crash	40	$54,830
42	12	54	Todd Bodine	BelCar Racing	Ford	230	0	crash	37	$46,790
43	41	43	Christian Fittipaldi	Petty Enterprises	Dodge	130	0	crash	34	$82,778
Official race results

Previous race: 2003 Mountain Dew Southern 500	NASCAR Winston Cup Series; 2003 season	Next race: 2003 Sylvania 300
