= 2003 Banquet 400 =

30th race of the 2003 Winston Cup Series

2003 Banquet 400 presented by ConAgra Foods
Race details
- Race 30 of 36 in the 2003 NASCAR Winston Cup Series
- The 2003 Banquet 400 presented by ConAgra Foods program cover.
- Date: October 5, 2003
- Official name: 3rd Annual Banquet 400 presented by ConAgra Foods
- Location: Kansas City, Kansas, Kansas Speedway
- Course: Permanent racing facility
- Course length: 1.5 miles (2.41 km)
- Distance: 267 laps, 400.5 mi (644.542 km)
- Scheduled distance: 267 laps, 400.5 mi (644.542 km)
- Average speed: 121.63 miles per hour (195.74 km/h)
- Attendance: 80,000

Pole position
Driver	Jimmie Johnson	Hendrick Motorsports
- Time: 29.938

Most laps led
Driver	Bill Elliott	Evernham Motorsports
- Laps: 115

Winner
No. 12	Ryan Newman	Penske Racing South

Television in the United States
- Network: NBC
- Announcers: Allen Bestwick, Benny Parsons, Wally Dallenbach Jr.

Radio in the United States
- Radio: Motor Racing Network

The 2003 Banquet 400 presented by ConAgra Foods was the 30th stock car race of the 2003 NASCAR Winston Cup Series season, and the third iteration of the event. The race was held on Sunday, October 5, 2003, before a crowd of 80,000 in Kansas City, Kansas, at Kansas Speedway, a 1.5 miles (2.4 km) permanent D-shaped oval racetrack. The race took the scheduled 267 laps to complete. At race's end, a cunning pit strategy for Penske Racing South driver Ryan Newman would propel him to his ninth career NASCAR Winston Cup Series win and his eighth win of the season. To fill out the podium, Bill Elliott and Jeremy Mayfield of Evernham Motorsports would finish second and third, respectively.

== Background ==
The layout of Kansas Speedway, the venue where the race was held.

Kansas Speedway is a 1.5-mile (2.4 km) tri-oval race track in Kansas City, Kansas. It was built in 2001 and hosts two annual NASCAR race weekends. The NTT IndyCar Series also raced there until 2011. The speedway is owned and operated by the International Speedway Corporation.

=== Entry list ===
#	Driver	Team	Make
0	Jason Leffler	Haas CNC Racing	Pontiac
1	John Andretti	Dale Earnhardt, Inc.	Chevrolet
01	Mike Skinner	MB2 Motorsports	Pontiac
2	Rusty Wallace	Penske Racing South	Dodge
4	Johnny Sauter	Morgan–McClure Motorsports	Pontiac
5	Terry Labonte	Hendrick Motorsports	Chevrolet
6	Mark Martin	Roush Racing	Ford
7	Jimmy Spencer	Ultra Motorsports	Dodge
8	Dale Earnhardt Jr.	Dale Earnhardt, Inc.	Chevrolet
9	Bill Elliott	Evernham Motorsports	Dodge
09	Mike Wallace	Phoenix Racing	Dodge
10	Johnny Benson Jr.	MB2 Motorsports	Pontiac
12	Ryan Newman	Penske Racing South	Dodge
14	Larry Foyt	A. J. Foyt Enterprises	Dodge
15	Michael Waltrip	Dale Earnhardt, Inc.	Chevrolet
16	Greg Biffle	Roush Racing	Ford
17	Matt Kenseth	Roush Racing	Ford
18	Bobby Labonte	Joe Gibbs Racing	Chevrolet
19	Jeremy Mayfield	Evernham Motorsports	Dodge
20	Tony Stewart	Joe Gibbs Racing	Chevrolet
21	Ricky Rudd	Wood Brothers Racing	Ford
22	Ward Burton	Bill Davis Racing	Dodge
23	Kenny Wallace	Bill Davis Racing	Dodge
24	Jeff Gordon	Hendrick Motorsports	Chevrolet
25	Joe Nemechek	Hendrick Motorsports	Chevrolet
29	Kevin Harvick	Richard Childress Racing	Chevrolet
30	Steve Park	Richard Childress Racing	Chevrolet
31	Robby Gordon	Richard Childress Racing	Chevrolet
32	Ricky Craven	PPI Motorsports	Pontiac
35	Bobby Hamilton Jr.	Team Rensi Motorsports	Ford
37	Derrike Cope	Quest Motor Racing	Chevrolet
38	Elliott Sadler	Robert Yates Racing	Ford
40	Sterling Marlin	Chip Ganassi Racing	Dodge
41	Casey Mears	Chip Ganassi Racing	Dodge
42	Jamie McMurray	Chip Ganassi Racing	Dodge
43	Jeff Green	Petty Enterprises	Dodge
45	Kyle Petty	Petty Enterprises	Dodge
48	Jimmie Johnson	Hendrick Motorsports	Chevrolet
49	Ken Schrader	BAM Racing	Dodge
54	Todd Bodine	BelCar Motorsports	Ford
74	Tony Raines	BACE Motorsports	Chevrolet
77	Dave Blaney	Jasper Motorsports	Ford
88	Dale Jarrett	Robert Yates Racing	Ford
97	Kurt Busch	Roush Racing	Ford
99	Jeff Burton	Roush Racing	Ford
Official entry list

== Practice ==
=== First practice ===
The first practice session was held on Friday, October 3, at 11:20 AM CST, and would last for 2 hours. Jimmie Johnson of Hendrick Motorsports would set the fastest time in the session, with a lap of 30.102 and an average speed of 179.390 miles per hour (288.700 km/h).

Pos.	#	Driver	Team	Make	Time	Speed
1	48	Jimmie Johnson	Hendrick Motorsports	Chevrolet	30.102	179.390
2	2	Rusty Wallace	Penske Racing South	Dodge	30.171	178.980
3	19	Jeremy Mayfield	Evernham Motorsports	Dodge	30.177	178.944
Full first practice results

=== Second practice ===
The second practice session was held on Saturday, October 4, at 9:30 AM CST, and would last for 45 minutes. Jimmie Johnson of Hendrick Motorsports would set the fastest time in the session, with a lap of 30.821 and an average speed of 175.205 miles per hour (281.965 km/h).

Pos.	#	Driver	Team	Make	Time	Speed
1	48	Jimmie Johnson	Hendrick Motorsports	Chevrolet	30.821	175.205
2	20	Tony Stewart	Joe Gibbs Racing	Chevrolet	30.831	175.148
3	9	Bill Elliott	Evernham Motorsports	Dodge	30.842	175.086
Full second practice results

=== Third and final practice ===
The third and final practice session, sometimes referred to as Happy Hour, was held on Saturday, October 4, at 11:10 AM CST, and would last for 45 minutes. Ryan Newman of Penske Racing South would set the fastest time in the session, with a lap of 30.814 and an average speed of 175.245 miles per hour (282.029 km/h).

Pos.	#	Driver	Team	Make	Time	Speed
1	12	Ryan Newman	Penske Racing South	Dodge	30.814	175.245
2	35	Bobby Hamilton Jr.	Team Rensi Motorsports	Ford	30.920	174.644
3	9	Bill Elliott	Evernham Motorsports	Dodge	31.212	173.010
Full Happy Hour practice results

== Qualifying ==
Qualifying was held on Friday, October 3, at 1:05 PM CST. Each driver would have two laps to set a fastest time; the fastest of the two would count as their official qualifying lap. Positions 1-36 would be decided on time, while positions 37-43 would be based on provisionals. Six spots are awarded by the use of provisionals based on owner's points. The seventh is awarded to a past champion who has not otherwise qualified for the race. If no past champ needs the provisional, the next team in the owner points will be awarded a provisional.

Jimmie Johnson of Hendrick Motorsports would win the pole, setting a time of 29.938 and an average speed of 180.373 miles per hour (290.282 km/h).

Two drivers would fail to qualify: Larry Foyt and Johnny Sauter.

=== Full qualifying results ===
Pos.	#	Driver	Team	Make	Time	Speed
1	48	Jimmie Johnson	Hendrick Motorsports	Chevrolet	29.938	180.373
2	01	Mike Skinner	MB2 Motorsports	Pontiac	30.059	179.647
3	8	Dale Earnhardt Jr.	Dale Earnhardt, Inc.	Chevrolet	30.070	179.581
4	18	Bobby Labonte	Joe Gibbs Racing	Chevrolet	30.095	179.432
5	2	Rusty Wallace	Penske Racing South	Dodge	30.109	179.348
6	0	Jason Leffler	Haas CNC Racing	Pontiac	30.138	179.176
7	24	Jeff Gordon	Hendrick Motorsports	Chevrolet	30.145	179.134
8	9	Bill Elliott	Evernham Motorsports	Dodge	30.156	179.069
9	43	Jeff Green	Petty Enterprises	Dodge	30.158	179.057
10	38	Elliott Sadler	Robert Yates Racing	Ford	30.161	179.039
11	12	Ryan Newman	Penske Racing South	Dodge	30.179	178.932
12	41	Casey Mears	Chip Ganassi Racing	Dodge	30.201	178.802
13	88	Dale Jarrett	Robert Yates Racing	Ford	30.244	178.548
14	20	Tony Stewart	Joe Gibbs Racing	Chevrolet	30.270	178.394
15	42	Jamie McMurray	Chip Ganassi Racing	Dodge	30.278	178.347
16	19	Jeremy Mayfield	Evernham Motorsports	Dodge	30.322	178.089
17	30	Steve Park	Richard Childress Racing	Chevrolet	30.324	178.077
18	35	Bobby Hamilton Jr.	Team Rensi Motorsports	Ford	30.331	178.036
19	21	Ricky Rudd	Wood Brothers Racing	Ford	30.355	177.895
20	10	Johnny Benson Jr.	MB2 Motorsports	Pontiac	30.364	177.842
21	97	Kurt Busch	Roush Racing	Ford	30.372	177.795
22	16	Greg Biffle	Roush Racing	Ford	30.372	177.795
23	54	Todd Bodine	BelCar Racing	Ford	30.372	177.795
24	29	Kevin Harvick	Richard Childress Racing	Chevrolet	30.386	177.713
25	31	Robby Gordon	Richard Childress Racing	Chevrolet	30.410	177.573
26	23	Kenny Wallace	Bill Davis Racing	Dodge	30.419	177.521
27	7	Jimmy Spencer	Ultra Motorsports	Dodge	30.444	177.375
28	77	Dave Blaney	Jasper Motorsports	Ford	30.467	177.241
29	40	Sterling Marlin	Chip Ganassi Racing	Dodge	30.479	177.171
30	25	Joe Nemechek	Hendrick Motorsports	Chevrolet	30.536	176.840
31	15	Michael Waltrip	Dale Earnhardt, Inc.	Chevrolet	30.617	176.373
32	32	Ricky Craven	PPI Motorsports	Pontiac	30.631	176.292
33	99	Jeff Burton	Roush Racing	Ford	30.634	176.275
34	5	Terry Labonte	Hendrick Motorsports	Chevrolet	30.638	176.252
35	74	Tony Raines	BACE Motorsports	Chevrolet	30.652	176.171
36	45	Kyle Petty	Petty Enterprises	Dodge	30.673	176.051
Provisionals
37	17	Matt Kenseth	Roush Racing	Ford	30.761	175.547
38	6	Mark Martin	Roush Racing	Ford	30.754	175.587
39	22	Ward Burton	Bill Davis Racing	Dodge	31.020	174.081
40	1	John Andretti	Dale Earnhardt, Inc.	Chevrolet	30.841	175.092
41	37	Derrike Cope	Quest Motor Racing	Chevrolet	31.460	171.646
42	09	Mike Wallace	Phoenix Racing	Dodge	30.715	175.810
43	49	Ken Schrader	BAM Racing	Dodge	30.687	175.970
Failed to qualify
44	14	Larry Foyt	A. J. Foyt Enterprises	Dodge	30.718	175.793
45	4	Johnny Sauter	Morgan–McClure Motorsports	Pontiac	30.769	175.501
Official qualifying results

== Race results ==
Fin	St	#	Driver	Team	Make	Laps	Led	Status	Pts	Winnings
1	11	12	Ryan Newman	Penske Racing South	Dodge	267	28	running	180	$191,000
2	8	9	Bill Elliott	Evernham Motorsports	Dodge	267	115	running	180	$203,623
3	16	19	Jeremy Mayfield	Evernham Motorsports	Dodge	267	37	running	170	$127,175
4	14	20	Tony Stewart	Joe Gibbs Racing	Chevrolet	267	0	running	160	$155,578
5	7	24	Jeff Gordon	Hendrick Motorsports	Chevrolet	267	0	running	155	$127,753
6	24	29	Kevin Harvick	Richard Childress Racing	Chevrolet	267	0	running	150	$115,053
7	1	48	Jimmie Johnson	Hendrick Motorsports	Chevrolet	267	20	running	151	$96,525
8	15	42	Jamie McMurray	Chip Ganassi Racing	Dodge	267	0	running	142	$77,175
9	5	2	Rusty Wallace	Penske Racing South	Dodge	267	23	running	143	$108,592
10	19	21	Ricky Rudd	Wood Brothers Racing	Ford	267	0	running	134	$99,125
11	23	54	Todd Bodine	BelCar Racing	Ford	267	0	running	130	$89,425
12	22	16	Greg Biffle	Roush Racing	Ford	267	0	running	127	$70,825
13	33	99	Jeff Burton	Roush Racing	Ford	267	0	running	124	$108,692
14	18	35	Bobby Hamilton Jr.	Team Rensi Motorsports	Ford	267	0	running	121	$65,150
15	27	7	Jimmy Spencer	Ultra Motorsports	Dodge	267	0	running	118	$83,200
16	34	5	Terry Labonte	Hendrick Motorsports	Chevrolet	267	0	running	115	$94,406
17	4	18	Bobby Labonte	Joe Gibbs Racing	Chevrolet	267	2	running	117	$109,633
18	3	8	Dale Earnhardt Jr.	Dale Earnhardt, Inc.	Chevrolet	267	9	running	114	$110,267
19	40	1	John Andretti	Dale Earnhardt, Inc.	Chevrolet	267	0	running	106	$89,237
20	38	6	Mark Martin	Roush Racing	Ford	267	0	running	103	$103,483
21	39	22	Ward Burton	Bill Davis Racing	Dodge	267	0	running	100	$99,706
22	17	30	Steve Park	Richard Childress Racing	Chevrolet	267	0	running	97	$74,850
23	36	45	Kyle Petty	Petty Enterprises	Dodge	267	0	running	94	$74,550
24	12	41	Casey Mears	Chip Ganassi Racing	Dodge	267	0	running	91	$85,625
25	25	31	Robby Gordon	Richard Childress Racing	Chevrolet	266	0	running	88	$91,512
26	35	74	Tony Raines	BACE Motorsports	Chevrolet	266	0	running	85	$65,625
27	9	43	Jeff Green	Petty Enterprises	Dodge	266	0	running	82	$101,203
28	43	49	Ken Schrader	BAM Racing	Dodge	266	0	running	79	$64,725
29	2	01	Mike Skinner	MB2 Motorsports	Pontiac	265	1	running	81	$70,414
30	6	0	Jason Leffler	Haas CNC Racing	Pontiac	265	5	running	78	$62,285
31	26	23	Kenny Wallace	Bill Davis Racing	Dodge	264	0	running	70	$61,575
32	42	09	Mike Wallace	Phoenix Racing	Dodge	264	0	running	67	$61,375
33	13	88	Dale Jarrett	Robert Yates Racing	Ford	263	25	engine	69	$107,853
34	29	40	Sterling Marlin	Chip Ganassi Racing	Dodge	263	0	out of gas	61	$104,975
35	20	10	Johnny Benson Jr.	MB2 Motorsports	Pontiac	248	0	crash	58	$87,525
36	37	17	Matt Kenseth	Roush Racing	Ford	220	0	running	55	$68,575
37	30	25	Joe Nemechek	Hendrick Motorsports	Chevrolet	211	0	running	52	$60,375
38	41	37	Derrike Cope	Quest Motor Racing	Chevrolet	199	0	engine	49	$60,175
39	31	15	Michael Waltrip	Dale Earnhardt, Inc.	Chevrolet	197	0	crash	46	$77,985
40	21	97	Kurt Busch	Roush Racing	Ford	181	2	engine	48	$79,785
41	32	32	Ricky Craven	PPI Motorsports	Pontiac	174	0	engine	40	$67,590
42	10	38	Elliott Sadler	Robert Yates Racing	Ford	104	0	crash	37	$93,645
43	28	77	Dave Blaney	Jasper Motorsports	Ford	80	0	crash	34	$67,457
Official race results

Previous race: 2003 EA Sports 500	NASCAR Winston Cup Series; 2003 season	Next race: 2003 UAW-GM Quality 500
