= 2003 Subway 500 =

32nd race of the 2003 NASCAR Winston Cup Series

Race details
- Race 32 of 36 in the 2003 NASCAR Winston Cup Series
- The 2003 Subway 500 program cover.
- Date: October 19, 2003
- Official name: 55th Annual Subway 500
- Location: Martinsville, Virginia, Martinsville Speedway
- Course: Permanent racing facility
- Course length: 0.526 miles (0.847 km)
- Distance: 500 laps, 263 mi (423.257 km)
- Average speed: 67.658 miles per hour (108.885 km/h)
- Attendance: 88,000

Pole position
Driver	Jeff Gordon	Hendrick Motorsports
- Time: 20.220

Most laps led
Driver	Jeff Gordon	Hendrick Motorsports
- Laps: 313

Winner
No. 24	Jeff Gordon	Hendrick Motorsports

Television in the United States
- Network: NBC
- Announcers: Allen Bestwick, Benny Parsons, Wally Dallenbach Jr.

Radio in the United States
- Radio: Motor Racing Network

The 2003 Subway 500 was the 32nd stock car race of the 2003 NASCAR Winston Cup Series season and the 55th iteration of the event. The race was held on Sunday, October 19, 2003, before a crowd of 88,000 in Martinsville, Virginia at Martinsville Speedway, a 0.526 miles (0.847 km) permanent oval-shaped short track. The race took the scheduled 500 laps to complete. At race's end, Jeff Gordon, driving for Hendrick Motorsports, would dominate most of the race weekend to win his 63rd career NASCAR Winston Cup Series victory and his second of the season. To fill out the podium, Jimmie Johnson, driving for Hendrick Motorsports, and Tony Stewart, driving for Joe Gibbs Racing, would finish second and third, respectively.

== Background ==
The layout of Martinsville Speedway, the venue where the race was held.

Martinsville Speedway is a NASCAR-owned stock car racing track located in Henry County, in Ridgeway, Virginia, just to the south of Martinsville. At 0.526 miles (0.847 km) in length, it is the shortest track in the NASCAR Cup Series. The track was also one of the first paved oval tracks in NASCAR, being built in 1947 by H. Clay Earles. It is also the only remaining race track that has been on the NASCAR circuit from its beginning in 1948.

=== Entry list ===
- (R) denotes rookie driver.

#	Driver	Team	Make
0	Jason Leffler	Haas CNC Racing	Pontiac
1	John Andretti	Dale Earnhardt, Inc.	Chevrolet
01	Mike Skinner	MB2 Motorsports	Pontiac
2	Rusty Wallace	Penske Racing South	Dodge
02	Hermie Sadler	SCORE Motorsports	Chevrolet
4	Kevin Lepage	Morgan–McClure Motorsports	Pontiac
5	Terry Labonte	Hendrick Motorsports	Chevrolet
6	Mark Martin	Roush Racing	Ford
7	Jimmy Spencer	Ultra Motorsports	Dodge
8	Dale Earnhardt Jr.	Dale Earnhardt, Inc.	Chevrolet
9	Bill Elliott	Evernham Motorsports	Dodge
10	Johnny Benson Jr.	MB2 Motorsports	Pontiac
12	Ryan Newman	Penske Racing South	Dodge
14	Mark Green	A. J. Foyt Enterprises	Dodge
15	Michael Waltrip	Dale Earnhardt, Inc.	Chevrolet
16	Greg Biffle (R)	Roush Racing	Ford
17	Matt Kenseth	Roush Racing	Ford
18	Bobby Labonte	Joe Gibbs Racing	Chevrolet
19	Jeremy Mayfield	Evernham Motorsports	Dodge
20	Tony Stewart	Joe Gibbs Racing	Chevrolet
21	Ricky Rudd	Wood Brothers Racing	Ford
22	Ward Burton	Bill Davis Racing	Dodge
23	Kenny Wallace	Bill Davis Racing	Dodge
24	Jeff Gordon	Hendrick Motorsports	Chevrolet
25	Joe Nemechek	Hendrick Motorsports	Chevrolet
29	Kevin Harvick	Richard Childress Racing	Chevrolet
30	Steve Park	Richard Childress Racing	Chevrolet
31	Robby Gordon	Richard Childress Racing	Chevrolet
32	Ricky Craven	PPI Motorsports	Pontiac
37	Derrike Cope	Quest Motor Racing	Chevrolet
38	Elliott Sadler	Robert Yates Racing	Ford
40	Sterling Marlin	Chip Ganassi Racing	Dodge
41	Casey Mears (R)	Chip Ganassi Racing	Dodge
42	Jamie McMurray (R)	Chip Ganassi Racing	Dodge
43	Jeff Green	Petty Enterprises	Dodge
45	Kyle Petty	Petty Enterprises	Dodge
48	Jimmie Johnson	Hendrick Motorsports	Chevrolet
49	Ken Schrader	BAM Racing	Dodge
54	Todd Bodine	BelCar Motorsports	Ford
74	Tony Raines	BACE Motorsports	Chevrolet
77	Dave Blaney	Jasper Motorsports	Ford
88	Dale Jarrett	Robert Yates Racing	Ford
89	Morgan Shepherd	Shepherd Racing Ventures	Ford
97	Kurt Busch	Roush Racing	Ford
99	Jeff Burton	Roush Racing	Ford
Official entry list

== Practice ==
=== First practice ===
The first practice session was held on Friday, October 17, at 11:20 AM EST. The session would last for two hours. Jeff Gordon, driving for Hendrick Motorsports, and Dale Earnhardt Jr., driving for Dale Earnhardt, Inc., would both set the fastest time in the session, with laps of 20.428 and an average speed of 92.696 miles per hour (149.180 km/h).

In the session, Ultra Motorsports driver Jimmy Spencer would suffer a crash, forcing Spencer to go to a backup car and start at the rear of the field for the race.

Pos.	#	Driver	Team	Make	Time	Speed
1	24	Jeff Gordon	Hendrick Motorsports	Chevrolet	20.428	92.696
2	8	Dale Earnhardt Jr.	Dale Earnhardt, Inc.	Chevrolet	20.428	92.696
3	12	Ryan Newman	Penske Racing South	Dodge	20.434	92.669
Full first practice results

=== Second practice ===
The second practice session was held on Saturday, October 18, at 9:30 AM EST. The session would last for 45 minutes. Kevin Harvick, driving for Richard Childress Racing, would set the fastest time in the session, with a lap of 20.440 and an average speed of 92.642 miles per hour (149.093 km/h).

Pos.	#	Driver	Team	Make	Time	Speed
1	29	Kevin Harvick	Richard Childress Racing	Chevrolet	20.440	92.642
2	2	Rusty Wallace	Penske Racing South	Dodge	20.510	92.326
3	24	Jeff Gordon	Hendrick Motorsports	Chevrolet	20.525	92.258
Full second practice results

=== Third and final practice ===
The final practice session, sometimes referred to as Happy Hour, was held on Saturday, October 18, at 9:30 AM EST. The session would last for 45 minutes. Rusty Wallace, driving for Penske Racing South, would set the fastest time in the session, with a lap of 20.513 and an average speed of 92.312 miles per hour (148.562 km/h).

In the session, BelCar Motorsports driver Todd Bodine would wreck in Turn 1, forcing Bodine to go to a backup car and start at the rear of the field for the race.

Pos.	#	Driver	Team	Make	Time	Speed
1	2	Rusty Wallace	Penske Racing South	Dodge	20.513	92.312
2	29	Kevin Harvick	Richard Childress Racing	Chevrolet	20.559	92.106
3	22	Ward Burton	Bill Davis Racing	Dodge	20.570	92.056
Full Happy Hour practice results

== Qualifying ==
Qualifying was held on Friday, October 17, at 3:05 PM EST. Each driver would have two laps to set a fastest time; the fastest of the two would count as their official qualifying lap. Positions 1-36 would be decided on time, while positions 37-43 would be based on provisionals. Six spots are awarded by the use of provisionals based on owner's points. The seventh is awarded to a past champion who has not otherwise qualified for the race. If no past champ needs the provisional, the next team in the owner points will be awarded a provisional.

Jeff Gordon, driving for Hendrick Motorsports, would win the pole, setting a time of 20.220 and an average speed of 93.650 miles per hour (150.715 km/h).

Two drivers would fail to qualify: Mark Green and Morgan Shepherd. In addition, three drivers would fail to make a lap: the Robert Yates Racing cars of Elliott Sadler and Dale Jarrett, and the aforementioned Morgan Shepherd. Dale Jarrett would suffer a crash on his first qualifying lap, and Sadler would suffer left rear camber problems that would prevent him from setting a lap, forcing both to take a provisional. Meanwhile, Shepherd's car was declared too light according to NASCAR, and could not get the car out on time to qualify.

=== Full qualifying results ===
Pos.	#	Driver	Team	Make	Time	Speed
1	24	Jeff Gordon	Hendrick Motorsports	Chevrolet	20.220	93.650
2	22	Ward Burton	Bill Davis Racing	Dodge	20.322	93.180
3	8	Dale Earnhardt Jr.	Dale Earnhardt, Inc.	Chevrolet	20.358	93.015
4	23	Kenny Wallace	Bill Davis Racing	Dodge	20.367	92.974
5	29	Kevin Harvick	Richard Childress Racing	Chevrolet	20.394	92.851
6	7	Jimmy Spencer	Ultra Motorsports	Dodge	20.405	92.801
7	2	Rusty Wallace	Penske Racing South	Dodge	20.406	92.796
8	12	Ryan Newman	Penske Racing South	Dodge	20.408	92.787
9	40	Sterling Marlin	Chip Ganassi Racing	Dodge	20.429	92.692
10	43	Jeff Green	Petty Enterprises	Dodge	20.430	92.687
11	01	Mike Skinner	MB2 Motorsports	Pontiac	20.458	92.560
12	21	Ricky Rudd	Wood Brothers Racing	Ford	20.459	92.556
13	97	Kurt Busch	Roush Racing	Ford	20.465	92.529
14	17	Matt Kenseth	Roush Racing	Ford	20.489	92.420
15	15	Michael Waltrip	Dale Earnhardt, Inc.	Chevrolet	20.495	92.393
16	20	Tony Stewart	Joe Gibbs Racing	Chevrolet	20.498	92.380
17	42	Jamie McMurray (R)	Chip Ganassi Racing	Dodge	20.500	92.371
18	49	Ken Schrader	BAM Racing	Dodge	20.508	92.335
19	16	Greg Biffle (R)	Roush Racing	Ford	20.514	92.308
20	18	Bobby Labonte	Joe Gibbs Racing	Chevrolet	20.515	92.303
21	99	Jeff Burton	Roush Racing	Ford	20.518	92.290
22	25	Joe Nemechek	Hendrick Motorsports	Chevrolet	20.519	92.285
23	6	Mark Martin	Roush Racing	Ford	20.533	92.222
24	4	Kevin Lepage	Morgan–McClure Motorsports	Pontiac	20.535	92.213
25	77	Dave Blaney	Jasper Motorsports	Ford	20.543	92.177
26	48	Jimmie Johnson	Hendrick Motorsports	Chevrolet	20.555	92.124
27	32	Ricky Craven	PPI Motorsports	Pontiac	20.558	92.110
28	9	Bill Elliott	Evernham Motorsports	Dodge	20.560	92.101
29	10	Johnny Benson Jr.	MBV Motorsports	Pontiac	20.573	92.043
30	19	Jeremy Mayfield	Evernham Motorsports	Dodge	20.574	92.038
31	5	Terry Labonte	Hendrick Motorsports	Chevrolet	20.578	92.021
32	45	Kyle Petty	Petty Enterprises	Dodge	20.595	91.945
33	74	Tony Raines	BACE Motorsports	Chevrolet	20.607	91.891
34	0	Jason Leffler	Haas CNC Racing	Pontiac	20.619	91.838
35	41	Casey Mears (R)	Chip Ganassi Racing	Dodge	20.635	91.766
36	54	Todd Bodine	BelCar Motorsports	Ford	20.646	91.717
Provisionals
37	31	Robby Gordon	Richard Childress Racing	Chevrolet	20.684	91.549
38	38	Elliott Sadler	Robert Yates Racing	Ford	-	-
39	88	Dale Jarrett	Robert Yates Racing	Ford	-	-
40	1	John Andretti	Dale Earnhardt, Inc.	Chevrolet	20.679	91.571
41	30	Steve Park	Richard Childress Racing	Chevrolet	20.660	91.655
42	37	Derrike Cope	Quest Motor Racing	Chevrolet	20.734	91.328
43	02	Hermie Sadler	SCORE Motorsports	Pontiac	20.702	91.469
Failed to qualify
44	14	Mark Green	A. J. Foyt Enterprises	Dodge	20.694	91.505
45	89	Morgan Shepherd	Shepherd Racing Ventures	Ford	-	-
Official qualifying results

== Race results ==
Fin	St	#	Driver	Team	Make	Laps	Led	Status	Pts	Winnings
1	1	24	Jeff Gordon	Hendrick Motorsports	Chevrolet	500	313	running	185	$183,018
2	26	48	Jimmie Johnson	Hendrick Motorsports	Chevrolet	500	0	running	170	$100,250
3	16	20	Tony Stewart	Joe Gibbs Racing	Chevrolet	500	2	running	170	$129,478
4	3	8	Dale Earnhardt Jr.	Dale Earnhardt, Inc.	Chevrolet	500	61	running	165	$115,937
5	8	12	Ryan Newman	Penske Racing South	Dodge	500	0	running	155	$90,225
6	31	5	Terry Labonte	Hendrick Motorsports	Chevrolet	500	40	running	155	$85,456
7	5	29	Kevin Harvick	Richard Childress Racing	Chevrolet	500	10	running	151	$92,228
8	17	42	Jamie McMurray (R)	Chip Ganassi Racing	Dodge	500	0	running	142	$57,125
9	28	9	Bill Elliott	Evernham Motorsports	Dodge	500	0	running	138	$89,758
10	21	99	Jeff Burton	Roush Racing	Ford	500	0	running	134	$90,142
11	39	88	Dale Jarrett	Robert Yates Racing	Ford	500	0	running	130	$94,003
12	41	30	Steve Park	Richard Childress Racing	Chevrolet	500	0	running	127	$64,900
13	14	17	Matt Kenseth	Roush Racing	Ford	500	0	running	124	$68,400
14	23	6	Mark Martin	Roush Racing	Ford	500	0	running	121	$85,008
15	12	21	Ricky Rudd	Wood Brothers Racing	Ford	500	0	running	118	$76,825
16	4	23	Kenny Wallace	Bill Davis Racing	Dodge	500	0	running	115	$66,575
17	35	41	Casey Mears (R)	Chip Ganassi Racing	Dodge	500	0	running	112	$71,175
18	2	22	Ward Burton	Bill Davis Racing	Dodge	500	0	running	109	$84,036
19	19	16	Greg Biffle (R)	Roush Racing	Ford	500	0	running	106	$48,925
20	22	25	Joe Nemechek	Hendrick Motorsports	Chevrolet	499	19	running	108	$50,925
21	11	01	Mike Skinner	MB2 Motorsports	Pontiac	499	0	running	100	$58,825
22	18	49	Ken Schrader	BAM Racing	Dodge	499	0	running	97	$48,075
23	33	74	Tony Raines	BACE Motorsports	Chevrolet	499	0	running	94	$48,725
24	10	43	Jeff Green	Petty Enterprises	Dodge	498	0	running	91	$83,353
25	32	45	Kyle Petty	Petty Enterprises	Dodge	498	0	running	88	$55,725
26	15	15	Michael Waltrip	Dale Earnhardt, Inc.	Chevrolet	498	0	running	85	$62,175
27	34	0	Jason Leffler	Haas CNC Racing	Pontiac	498	0	running	82	$47,010
28	38	38	Elliott Sadler	Robert Yates Racing	Ford	497	0	running	79	$80,610
29	7	2	Rusty Wallace	Penske Racing South	Dodge	497	18	running	81	$78,392
30	43	02	Hermie Sadler	SCORE Motorsports	Pontiac	495	0	running	73	$44,150
31	40	1	John Andretti	Dale Earnhardt, Inc.	Chevrolet	495	0	running	70	$68,762
32	27	32	Ricky Craven	PPI Motorsports	Pontiac	495	0	running	67	$59,889
33	30	19	Jeremy Mayfield	Evernham Motorsports	Dodge	490	0	running	64	$52,270
34	29	10	Johnny Benson Jr.	MBV Motorsports	Pontiac	488	0	running	61	$70,070
35	24	4	Kevin Lepage	Morgan–McClure Motorsports	Pontiac	475	0	running	58	$43,275
36	37	31	Robby Gordon	Richard Childress Racing	Chevrolet	473	0	running	55	$68,412
37	25	77	Dave Blaney	Jasper Motorsports	Ford	471	0	running	52	$51,175
38	6	7	Jimmy Spencer	Ultra Motorsports	Dodge	459	0	running	49	$43,115
39	13	97	Kurt Busch	Roush Racing	Ford	407	37	engine	51	$63,065
40	36	54	Todd Bodine	BelCar Motorsports	Ford	407	0	crash	43	$42,990
41	20	18	Bobby Labonte	Joe Gibbs Racing	Chevrolet	271	0	engine	40	$88,023
42	42	37	Derrike Cope	Quest Motor Racing	Chevrolet	260	0	overheating	37	$42,900
43	9	40	Sterling Marlin	Chip Ganassi Racing	Dodge	127	0	engine	34	$86,191
Failed to qualify
44		14	Mark Green	A. J. Foyt Enterprises	Dodge					
45		89	Morgan Shepherd	Shepherd Racing Ventures	Ford					
Official race results

Previous race: 2003 UAW-GM Quality 500	NASCAR Winston Cup Series; 2003 season	Next race: 2003 Bass Pro Shops MBNA 500 (October)
