= Tony Ave =

American racing driver (born 1968)

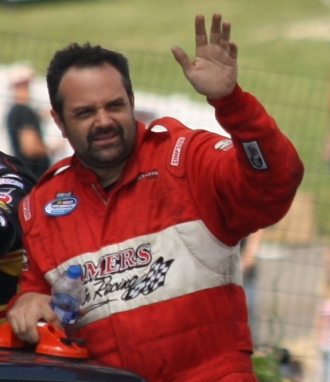
- Ave at Road America in 2010
- Nationality: (United States) American
- Born: 10 November 1968 (age 58) Hurley, Wisconsin, U.S.
- Categorisation: FIA Gold (until 2016); FIA Silver (2017–)
- Achievements: 2010 Trans-Am Series champion

NASCAR Cup Series career
- 2 races run over 2 years
- Best finish: 67th (2009)
- First race: 2004 Sirius at the Glen (Watkins Glen)
- Last race: 2009 Heluva Good! Sour Cream Dips at The Glen (Watkins Glen)
Wins	Top tens	Poles
0	0	0

NASCAR O'Reilly Auto Parts Series career
- 4 races run over 2 years
- Best finish: 87th (2010)
- First race: 2009 NAPA Auto Parts 200 (Montreal)
- Last race: 2010 NAPA 200 (Montreal)
Wins	Top tens	Poles
0	0	0
- Statistics up to date as of 30 November 2011.

Tony Ave (born 10 November 1968) is an American race car driver born in Hurley, Wisconsin, US. He competed in the Grand-Am Series from 2000 until 2002, in Formula Atlantic from 1996 until 2001, and in the Trans-Am Series since 2009. He also made three Indy Lights starts in 1993 and one Indy Pro Series start in 2003. He also has sporadic starts in NASCAR as a road course ringer.

== Trans-Am ==
In 2009, Ave was a regular competitor in the revived SCCA Trans-Am Series, driving a Chevrolet Corvette. In 2010, he brought Chevrolet its first Trans Am championship since Paul Gentilozzi in 1998.

Ave won the 2010 and 2011 Trans-Am Series Championships. Ave owns Tony Ave Motorsports, which has become one of the most popular race teams amongst fans. However, he mostly drives for Lamers Racing.

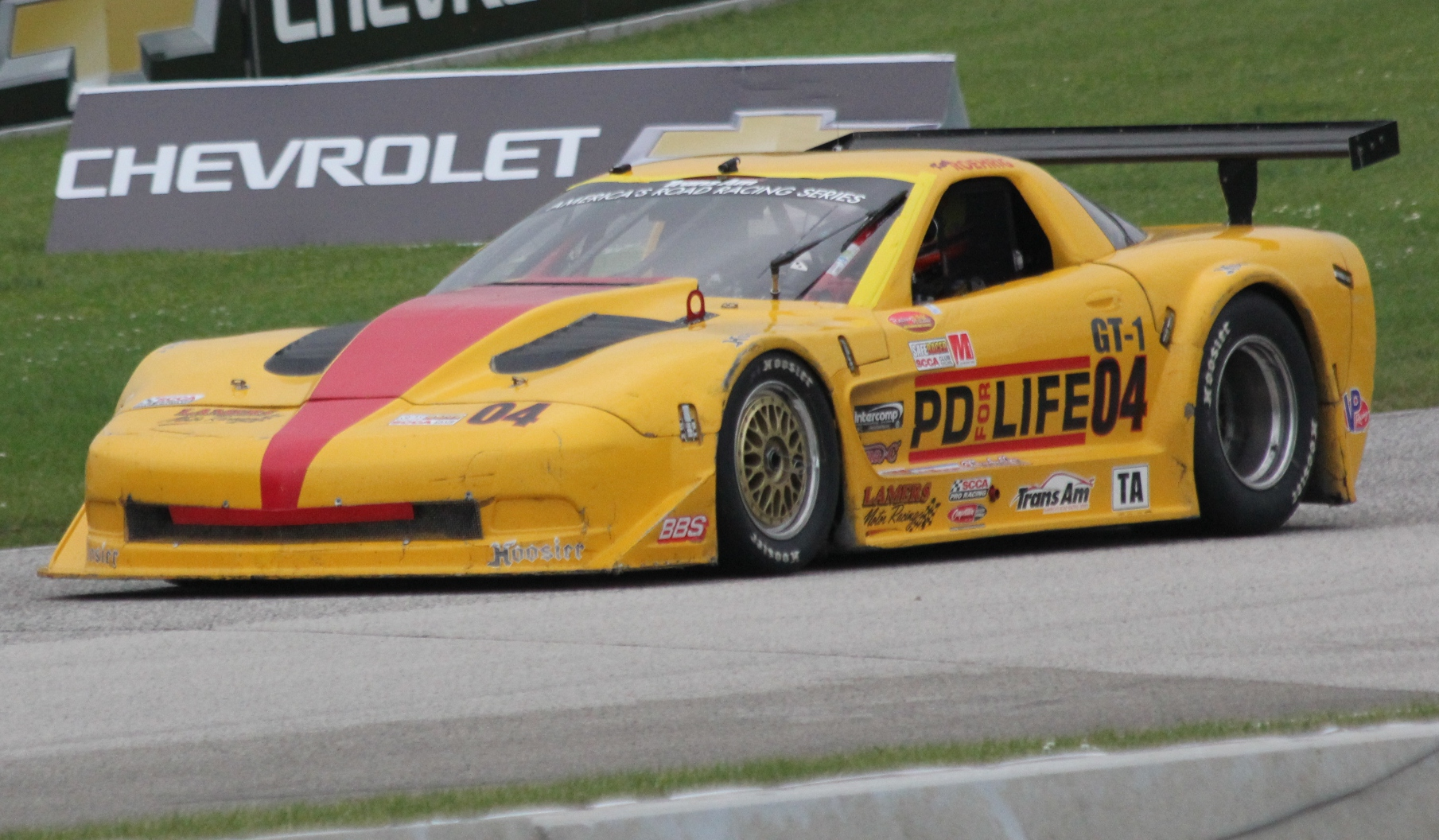
Ave driving a Chevrolet Corvette in the Trans Am Series in 2014

== NASCAR ==
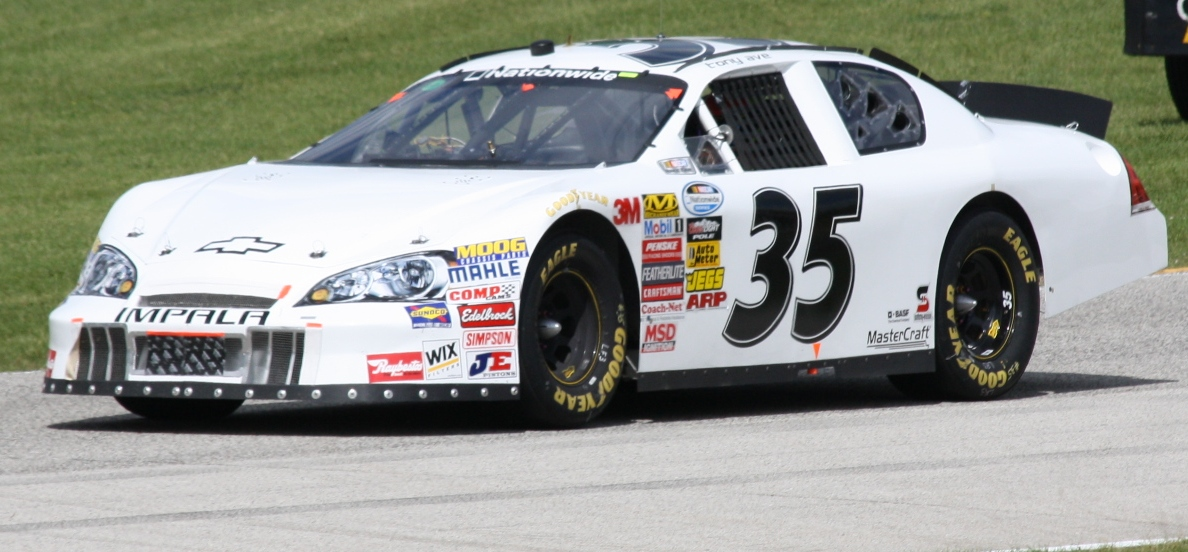
2010 NASCAR Nationwide car at Road America

In 2004, Ave made his NASCAR Nextel Cup Series debut at Watkins Glen International when he drove the No. 80 car owned by Hover Motorsports, a satellite team of Joe Gibbs Racing. Starting 42nd, Ave dropped out after 84 laps with a brake problem, finishing 31st.

Ave returned to the Cup Series in 2009, competed at Watkins Glen on August 10, 2009 in the rain-delayed Heluva Good! Sour Cream Dips at The Glen. Ave completed eight laps and finished 43rd in his No. 37 Long John Silver's Dodge owned by Front Row Motorsports. Ave also participated in the NASCAR Nationwide Series' NAPA Parts D'Auto 200 presented by Dodge at Circuit Gilles Villeneuve as a road course ringer.

Ave participated in the No. 35 car owned by TriStar Motorsports in the 2010 Bucyrus 200 at Road America in his home state of Wisconsin. After racing in the top-ten for most of the race, he spun out on the final lap and dropped out of the top-ten. He returned to the No. 35 team for the other two road course races, finishing fifteenth at Watkins Glen and leading one lap in Montreal – his first and only lap led in his Nationwide Series career.

In 2011, Ave made his so far last NASCAR attempt at Sonoma, attempting to qualify his No. 38 Long John Silver's car for FRM. He was bumped out of the field by Andy Pilgrim and did not qualify.

== Other racing ==
In April 2002, Ave, along with Andy Hillenburg, tested for the Team Racing Auto Circuit series at Atlanta Motor Speedway. Four months later, Ave and Boris Said tested for TRAC at Lowe's Motor Speedway.

In 2016, Ave made an agreement with Bill Riley to build a prototype chassis for ELMS for the P3 and IMSA for the Prototype Challenge.

== Motorsports career results ==
=== SCCA National Championship Runoffs ===
Year	Track	Car	Engine	Class	Finish	Start	Status
1991	Road Atlanta	Lola T87/90	Ford	Sports 2000	16	3	Running
1994	Mid-Ohio	Van Diemen	Ford	Formula Continental	22	7	Retired
1994	Mid-Ohio	XFR GS-94	Toyota	Formula Atlantic	10	2	Retired
2007	Heartland Park	Chevrolet Corvette	Chevrolet	GT1	1	1	Running
2008	Heartland Park	Ford Mustang	Ford	GT1	2	2	Running
2019	VIR	Chevrolet Corvette	Chevrolet	GT1	2	1	Running
2019	VIR	Acura RSX	Honda	GT3	11	2	Retired
2020	Road America	Ford Mustang	Ford	GT1	1	2	Running
2020	Road America	Nissan 240SX	Nissan	GT3	7	4	Running
2022	VIR	Nissan 350Z	Nissan	GT2	4	3	Running
2022	VIR	Acura RSX	Honda	GT3	1	3	Running
2023	VIR	Nissan 350Z	Nissan	GT2	13	2	Retired
2023	VIR	Acura RSX	Honda	GT3	1	1	Running
2023	VIR	Stohr WF1	Suzuki	Prototype 2	4	5	Running
2023	VIR	Mercedes-AMG GT4	Mercedes-AMG	T1	4	4	Running
2024	Road America	Swift 016a	Mazda	Formula Atlantic	3	3	Running
2024	Road America	Ford Mustang	Ford	GT1	DNF	13	Retired
2024	Road America	Porsche 991.2 GT3 Cup	Porsche	GT2	6	7	Running
2024	Road America	Honda Civic	Honda	GT3	10	1	Running
2024	Road America	Mercedes-AMG GT4	Mercedes-AMG	T1	2	3	Running
2025	Road America	Swift 016a	Mazda	Formula Atlantic	DNF	2	Retired
2025	Road America	Chevrolet Camaro	Chevrolet	GT1	1	1	Running
2025	Road America	Nissan 350Z	Nissan	GT2	6	5	Running
2025	Road America	Honda Civic	Honda	GT3U	8	1	Running
2026	Road America	Swift 016a	Mazda	Formula Atlantic	9	3	Running
2026	Road America	Mazda Miata	Mazda	EP	3	4	Running
2026	Road America	Chevrolet Camaro	Chevrolet	GT1	1	1	Running
2026	Road America	Porsche 991.2 GT3 Cup	Porsche	GT2	4	4	Running
2026	Road America	Honda Civic	Honda	STU	DNF	18	Retired

=== NASCAR ===
(key) (Bold – Pole position awarded by qualifying time. Italics – Pole position earned by points standings or practice time. * – Most laps led.)

==== Sprint Cup Series ====
NASCAR Sprint Cup Series results
Year	Team	No.	Make	1	2	3	4	5	6	7	8	9	10	11	12	13	14	15	16	17	18	19	20	21	22	23	24	25	26	27	28	29	30	31	32	33	34	35	36	NSCC	Pts	Ref
2004	Hover Motorsports	80	Chevy	DAY	CAR	LVS	ATL	DAR	BRI	TEX	MAR	TAL	CAL	RCH	CLT	DOV	POC	MCH	SON	DAY	CHI	NHA	POC	IND	GLN; 31	MCH														83rd	70	
2004	Hover Motorsports	80	Ford																								BRI; DNQ	CAL	RCH	NHA	DOV	TAL	KAN	CLT	MAR	ATL	PHO	DAR	HOM	83rd	70	
2009	Front Row Motorsports	37	Dodge	DAY	CAL	LVS	ATL	BRI	MAR	TEX	PHO	TAL	RCH	DAR	CLT	DOV	POC	MCH	SON	NHA	DAY	CHI	IND	POC	GLN; 43	MCH	BRI	ATL	RCH	NHA	DOV	KAN	CAL	CLT	MAR	TAL	TEX	PHO	HOM	67th	34	
2010	TriStar Motorsports	35	Chevy	DAY	CAL	LVS	ATL	BRI	MAR	PHO	TEX	TAL	RCH	DAR	DOV	CLT	POC	MCH	SON	NHA	DAY	CHI	IND	POC	GLN; DNQ	MCH	BRI	ATL	RCH	NHA	DOV	KAN	CAL	CLT	MAR	TAL	TEX	PHO	HOM	N/A	0	
2011	Front Row Motorsports	38	Ford	DAY	PHO	LVS	BRI	CAL	MAR	TEX	TAL	RCH	DAR	DOV	CLT	KAN	POC	MCH	SON; DNQ	DAY	KEN	NHA	IND	POC	GLN	MCH	BRI	ATL	RCH	CHI	NHA	DOV	KAN	CLT	TAL	MAR	TEX	PHO	HOM	N/A	0	

==== Nationwide Series ====
NASCAR Nationwide Series results
Year	Team	No.	Make	1	2	3	4	5	6	7	8	9	10	11	12	13	14	15	16	17	18	19	20	21	22	23	24	25	26	27	28	29	30	31	32	33	34	35	NNSC	Pts	Ref
2009	Jimmy Means Racing	52	Chevy	DAY	CAL	LVS	BRI	TEX	NSH	PHO	TAL	RCH	DAR	CLT	DOV	NSH	KEN	MLW	NHA	DAY	CHI	GTY	IRP	IOW	GLN	MCH	BRI	CGV; 39	ATL; DNQ	RCH	DOV	KAN	CAL	CLT	MEM	TEX	PHO	HOM	145th	46	
2010	TriStar Motorsports	35	Chevy	DAY	CAL	LVS	BRI	NSH	PHO	TEX	TAL	RCH	DAR	DOV	CLT	NSH	KEN	ROA; 20	NHA	DAY	CHI	GTY	IRP	IOW	GLN; 15	MCH	BRI	CGV; 36	ATL	RCH	DOV	KAN	CAL	CLT	GTY	TEX	PHO	HOM	87th	281	

==== Craftsman Truck Series ====
NASCAR Craftsman Truck Series results
Year	Team	No.	Make	1	2	3	4	5	6	7	8	9	10	11	12	13	14	15	16	17	18	19	20	21	22	23	24	NCTC	Pts	Ref
2000	Brevak Racing	31	Ford	DAY	HOM	PHO	MMR	MAR	PIR	GTY	MEM	PPR	EVG	TEX	KEN	GLN	MLW	NHA	NZH	MCH	IRP; DNQ	NSV	CIC	RCH	DOV	TEX	CAL	N/A	0	

=== ARCA Re/Max Series ===
(key) (Bold – Pole position awarded by qualifying time. Italics – Pole position earned by points standings or practice time. * – Most laps led.)

ARCA Re/Max Series results
Year	Team	No.	Make	1	2	3	4	5	6	7	8	9	10	11	12	13	14	15	16	17	18	19	20	21	22	23	ARMC	Pts	Ref
2002	Burroughs Motorsports	53	Ford	DAY	ATL	NSH	SLM	KEN	CLT	KAN	POC	MCH	TOL	SBO	KEN	BLN	POC	NSH	ISF	WIN	DSF	CHI; 4	SLM	TAL	CLT		108th	125	
2003	Bobby Gerhart Racing	7	Pontiac	DAY; 23	ATL	NSH	SLM	TOL	KEN	CLT	BLN	KAN	MCH	LER	POC	POC	NSH	ISF	WIN	DSF	CHI	SLM					82nd	330	
2003	Hendren Motorsports	66	Pontiac																				TAL; 3	CLT	SBO		82nd	330	
2006	Fast Track Racing	11	Chevy	DAY	NSH	SLM	WIN	KEN	TOL	POC	MCH	KAN	KEN	BLN	POC	GTW	NSH	MCH	ISF	MIL	TOL	DSF	CHI; DNQ	SLM			140th	110	
2006	CyberSpeed Racing	87	Chevy																						TAL; 29	IOW	140th	110	
2007	CyberSpeed Racing	87	Chevy	DAY; DNQ	USA	NSH	SLM	KAN	WIN	KEN	TOL	IOW	POC	MCH	BLN	KEN	POC	NSH	ISF	MIL	GTW	DSF	CHI	SLM	TAL	TOL	N/A	0	
2008	CyberSpeed Racing	66	Chevy	DAY	SLM	IOW	KAN	CAR	KEN	TOL	POC	MCH	CAY	KEN	BLN	POC	NSH	ISF	DSF	CHI	SLM	NJE; 31	TAL	TOL			141st	75	
