= 2004 Sirius at The Glen =

Race details
- Race 22 of 36 in the 2004 NASCAR Nextel Cup Series
- The 2004 Sirius at The Glen program cover.
- Date: August 15, 2004
- Official name: 19th Annual Sirius at The Glen
- Location: Watkins Glen, New York, Watkins Glen International
- Course: Permanent racing facility
- Course length: 2.454 miles (3.949 km)
- Distance: 90 laps, 220.5 mi (354.86 km)
- Scheduled distance: 90 laps, 220.5 mi (354.86 km)
- Average speed: 92.249 miles per hour (148.460 km/h)

Pole position
Driver	Jimmie Johnson	Hendrick Motorsports
- Time: Set by 2004 owner's points

Most laps led
Driver	Tony Stewart	Joe Gibbs Racing
- Laps: 46

Winner
No. 20	Tony Stewart	Joe Gibbs Racing

Television in the United States
- Network: TNT
- Announcers: Allen Bestwick, Benny Parsons, Wally Dallenbach Jr.

Radio in the United States
- Radio: Motor Racing Network

The 2004 Sirius at The Glen was the 22nd stock car race of the 2004 NASCAR Nextel Cup Series season and the 19th iteration of the event. The race was held on Sunday, August 15, 2004, in Watkins Glen, New York at the shortened layout of Watkins Glen International, a 2.454 miles (3.949 km) permanent road course. The race took the scheduled 90 laps to complete. At race's end, a sick Tony Stewart, driving for Joe Gibbs Racing, would be able to overcome sickness and soiling himself during the race, defending against Ron Fellows of Dale Earnhardt, Inc. to win his 19th career NASCAR Nextel Cup Series victory and his second and final win of the season. To fill out the podium, Mark Martin of Roush Racing would finish third.

== Background ==
The layout of Watkins Glen International NASCAR uses.

Watkins Glen International (nicknamed "The Glen") is an automobile race track located in Watkins Glen, New York at the southern tip of Seneca Lake. It was long known around the world as the home of the Formula One United States Grand Prix, which it hosted for twenty consecutive years (1961–1980), but the site has been home to road racing of nearly every class, including the World Sportscar Championship, Trans-Am, Can-Am, NASCAR Sprint Cup Series, the International Motor Sports Association and the IndyCar Series.

Initially, public roads in the village were used for the race course. In 1956 a permanent circuit for the race was built. In 1968 the race was extended to six hours, becoming the 6 Hours of Watkins Glen. The circuit's current layout has more or less been the same since 1971, although a chicane was installed at the uphill Esses in 1975 to slow cars through these corners, where there was a fatality during practice at the 1973 United States Grand Prix. The chicane was removed in 1985, but another chicane called the "Inner Loop" was installed in 1992 after J. D. McDuffie's fatal accident during the previous year's NASCAR Winston Cup event.

The circuit is known as the Mecca of North American road racing and is a very popular venue among fans and drivers. The facility is currently owned by International Speedway Corporation.

=== Entry list ===
No.	Driver	Team	Make
0	Ward Burton	Haas CNC Racing	Chevrolet
1	Ron Fellows	Dale Earnhardt, Inc.	Chevrolet
01	Joe Nemechek	MBV Motorsports	Chevrolet
2	Rusty Wallace	Penske-Jasper Racing	Dodge
02	Hermie Sadler	SCORE Motorsports	Chevrolet
4	Jimmy Spencer	Morgan–McClure Motorsports	Chevrolet
5	Terry Labonte	Hendrick Motorsports	Chevrolet
6	Mark Martin	Roush Racing	Ford
8	Dale Earnhardt Jr.	Dale Earnhardt, Inc.	Chevrolet
9	Kasey Kahne	Evernham Motorsports	Dodge
10	Scott Riggs	MBV Motorsports	Chevrolet
12	Ryan Newman	Penske-Jasper Racing	Dodge
15	Michael Waltrip	Dale Earnhardt, Inc.	Chevrolet
16	Greg Biffle	Roush Racing	Ford
17	Matt Kenseth	Roush Racing	Ford
18	Bobby Labonte	Joe Gibbs Racing	Chevrolet
19	Jeremy Mayfield	Evernham Motorsports	Dodge
20	Tony Stewart	Joe Gibbs Racing	Chevrolet
21	Ricky Rudd	Wood Brothers Racing	Ford
22	Scott Wimmer	Bill Davis Racing	Dodge
24	Jeff Gordon	Hendrick Motorsports	Chevrolet
25	Brian Vickers	Hendrick Motorsports	Chevrolet
29	Kevin Harvick	Richard Childress Racing	Chevrolet
30	Dave Blaney	Richard Childress Racing	Chevrolet
31	Robby Gordon	Richard Childress Racing	Chevrolet
32	Ricky Craven	PPI Motorsports	Chevrolet
36	Boris Said	MB2 Motorsports	Chevrolet
38	Elliott Sadler	Robert Yates Racing	Ford
39	Scott Pruett	Chip Ganassi Racing	Dodge
40	Sterling Marlin	Chip Ganassi Racing	Dodge
41	Casey Mears	Chip Ganassi Racing	Dodge
42	Jamie McMurray	Chip Ganassi Racing	Dodge
43	Jeff Green	Petty Enterprises	Dodge
45	Kyle Petty	Petty Enterprises	Dodge
48	Jimmie Johnson	Hendrick Motorsports	Chevrolet
49	Ken Schrader	BAM Racing	Dodge
50	Todd Bodine	Arnold Motorsports	Dodge
52	Stanton Barrett	Rick Ware Racing	Dodge
59	Klaus Graf	BAM Racing	Dodge
72	Tom Hubert	Kirk Shelmerdine Racing	Ford
77	Brendan Gaughan	Penske-Jasper Racing	Dodge
80	Tony Ave	Hover Motorsports	Chevrolet
88	Dale Jarrett	Robert Yates Racing	Ford
89	Morgan Shepherd	Shepherd Racing Ventures	Dodge
97	Kurt Busch	Roush Racing	Ford
98	Larry Gunselman	Mach 1 Motorsports	Ford
99	Jeff Burton	Roush Racing	Ford
Official entry list

== Practice ==
Originally, three practice sessions were scheduled to be held, with one on Friday and two on Saturday, However, constant rain on Friday meant the only practice session on Friday would be canceled. The two Saturday sessions were run as planned.

=== First practice ===
The first practice session would occur on Saturday, August 14, at 9:30 AM EST and would last for 45 minutes. Jeff Gordon of Hendrick Motorsports would set the fastest time in the session, with a lap of 1:12.034 and an average speed of 122.442 miles per hour (197.051 km/h).

Pos.	No.	Driver	Team	Make	Time	Speed
1	24	Jeff Gordon	Hendrick Motorsports	Chevrolet	1:12.034	122.442
2	20	Tony Stewart	Joe Gibbs Racing	Chevrolet	1:12.351	121.906
3	6	Mark Martin	Roush Racing	Ford	1:12.440	121.756
Full first practice results

=== Second and final practice ===
The second and final practice session, sometimes referred to as Happy Hour, would occur on Saturday, August 14, at 11:10 AM EST and would last for 45 minutes. Robby Gordon of Richard Childress Racing would set the fastest time in the session, with a lap of 1:11.652 and an average speed of 123.095 miles per hour (198.102 km/h).

Pos.	No.	Driver	Team	Make	Time	Speed
1	31	Robby Gordon	Richard Childress Racing	Chevrolet	1:11.652	123.095
2	24	Jeff Gordon	Hendrick Motorsports	Chevrolet	1:11.916	122.643
3	19	Jeremy Mayfield	Evernham Motorsports	Dodge	1:12.175	122.203
Full Happy Hour practice results

== Starting lineup ==
Qualifying was scheduled to be held on Friday, August 13, at 3:10 PM EST. However, constant rain during Friday would cancel all on-track activities. The lineup was then determined by the current 2004 owner's points. As a result, Jimmie Johnson of Hendrick Motorsports won the pole.

Four drivers would fail to qualify: Scott Pruett, Boris Said, Klaus Graf, and Stanton Barrett.

=== Full starting lineup ===
Pos.	No.	Driver	Team	Make
1	48	Jimmie Johnson	Hendrick Motorsports	Chevrolet
2	24	Jeff Gordon	Hendrick Motorsports	Chevrolet
3	8	Dale Earnhardt Jr.	Dale Earnhardt, Inc.	Chevrolet
4	20	Tony Stewart	Joe Gibbs Racing	Chevrolet
5	17	Matt Kenseth	Roush Racing	Ford
6	38	Elliott Sadler	Robert Yates Racing	Ford
7	97	Kurt Busch	Roush Racing	Ford
8	18	Bobby Labonte	Joe Gibbs Racing	Chevrolet
9	29	Kevin Harvick	Richard Childress Racing	Chevrolet
10	12	Ryan Newman	Penske-Jasper Racing	Dodge
11	9	Kasey Kahne	Evernham Motorsports	Dodge
12	19	Jeremy Mayfield	Evernham Motorsports	Dodge
13	88	Dale Jarrett	Robert Yates Racing	Ford
14	42	Jamie McMurray	Chip Ganassi Racing	Dodge
15	6	Mark Martin	Roush Racing	Ford
16	41	Casey Mears	Chip Ganassi Racing	Dodge
17	2	Rusty Wallace	Penske-Jasper Racing	Dodge
18	15	Michael Waltrip	Dale Earnhardt, Inc.	Chevrolet
19	40	Sterling Marlin	Chip Ganassi Racing	Dodge
20	5	Terry Labonte	Hendrick Motorsports	Chevrolet
21	16	Greg Biffle	Roush Racing	Ford
22	25	Brian Vickers	Hendrick Motorsports	Chevrolet
23	31	Robby Gordon	Richard Childress Racing	Chevrolet
24	99	Jeff Burton	Roush Racing	Ford
25	01	Joe Nemechek	MBV Motorsports	Chevrolet
26	22	Scott Wimmer	Bill Davis Racing	Dodge
27	30	Dave Blaney	Richard Childress Racing	Chevrolet
28	0	Ward Burton	Haas CNC Racing	Chevrolet
29	21	Ricky Rudd	Wood Brothers Racing	Ford
30	77	Brendan Gaughan	Penske-Jasper Racing	Dodge
31	10	Scott Riggs	MBV Motorsports	Chevrolet
32	49	Ken Schrader	BAM Racing	Dodge
33	45	Kyle Petty	Petty Enterprises	Dodge
34	32	Ricky Craven	PPI Motorsports	Chevrolet
35	43	Jeff Green	Petty Enterprises	Dodge
36	50	Todd Bodine	Arnold Motorsports	Dodge
37	72	Tom Hubert	Kirk Shelmerdine Racing	Ford
38	4	Jimmy Spencer	Morgan–McClure Motorsports	Chevrolet
39	98	Larry Gunselman	Mach 1 Motorsports	Ford
40	89	Morgan Shepherd	Shepherd Racing Ventures	Dodge
41	02	Hermie Sadler	SCORE Motorsports	Chevrolet
42	80	Tony Ave	Hover Motorsports	Chevrolet
43	1	Ron Fellows	Dale Earnhardt, Inc.	Chevrolet
Failed to qualify
44	39	Scott Pruett	Chip Ganassi Racing	Dodge
45	36	Boris Said	MB2 Motorsports	Chevrolet
46	59	Klaus Graf	BAM Racing	Dodge
47	52	Stanton Barrett	Rick Ware Racing	Dodge
Official starting lineup

== Race results ==
Fin	St	No.	Driver	Team	Make	Laps	Led	Status	Pts	Winnings
1	4	20	Tony Stewart	Joe Gibbs Racing	Chevrolet	90	46	running	190	$195,288
2	43	1	Ron Fellows	Dale Earnhardt, Inc.	Chevrolet	90	0	running	170	$101,260
3	15	6	Mark Martin	Roush Racing	Ford	90	0	running	165	$98,910
4	16	41	Casey Mears	Chip Ganassi Racing	Dodge	90	8	running	165	$96,150
5	3	8	Dale Earnhardt Jr.	Dale Earnhardt, Inc.	Chevrolet	90	1	running	160	$111,708
6	9	29	Kevin Harvick	Richard Childress Racing	Chevrolet	90	1	running	155	$102,943
7	12	19	Jeremy Mayfield	Evernham Motorsports	Dodge	90	0	running	146	$89,585
8	29	21	Ricky Rudd	Wood Brothers Racing	Ford	90	0	running	142	$94,966
9	5	17	Matt Kenseth	Roush Racing	Ford	90	0	running	138	$109,808
10	7	97	Kurt Busch	Roush Racing	Ford	90	1	running	139	$81,140
11	8	18	Bobby Labonte	Joe Gibbs Racing	Chevrolet	90	0	running	130	$102,813
12	24	99	Jeff Burton	Roush Racing	Ford	90	0	running	127	$94,992
13	14	42	Jamie McMurray	Chip Ganassi Racing	Dodge	90	0	running	124	$70,075
14	11	9	Kasey Kahne	Evernham Motorsports	Dodge	90	0	running	121	$92,085
15	6	38	Elliott Sadler	Robert Yates Racing	Ford	90	0	running	118	$96,353
16	23	31	Robby Gordon	Richard Childress Racing	Chevrolet	90	12	running	120	$91,387
17	35	43	Jeff Green	Petty Enterprises	Dodge	90	0	running	112	$86,430
18	33	45	Kyle Petty	Petty Enterprises	Dodge	90	0	running	109	$72,460
19	26	22	Scott Wimmer	Bill Davis Racing	Dodge	90	0	running	106	$77,605
20	18	15	Michael Waltrip	Dale Earnhardt, Inc.	Chevrolet	90	0	running	103	$92,366
21	2	24	Jeff Gordon	Hendrick Motorsports	Chevrolet	90	13	running	105	$103,413
22	25	01	Joe Nemechek	MBV Motorsports	Chevrolet	90	0	running	97	$74,754
23	31	10	Scott Riggs	MBV Motorsports	Chevrolet	90	0	running	94	$84,157
24	27	30	Dave Blaney	Richard Childress Racing	Chevrolet	90	0	running	91	$65,785
25	17	2	Rusty Wallace	Penske-Jasper Racing	Dodge	89	0	running	88	$98,158
26	10	12	Ryan Newman	Penske-Jasper Racing	Dodge	89	0	running	85	$101,032
27	13	88	Dale Jarrett	Robert Yates Racing	Ford	89	0	running	82	$88,457
28	32	49	Ken Schrader	BAM Racing	Dodge	89	0	running	79	$56,880
29	37	72	Tom Hubert	Kirk Shelmerdine Racing	Ford	89	0	running	76	$53,635
30	22	25	Brian Vickers	Hendrick Motorsports	Chevrolet	89	0	running	73	$65,050
31	42	80	Tony Ave	Hover Motorsports	Chevrolet	84	0	running	70	$53,465
32	34	32	Ricky Craven	PPI Motorsports	Chevrolet	83	0	transmission	67	$64,375
33	41	02	Hermie Sadler	SCORE Motorsports	Chevrolet	79	0	too slow	64	$56,725
34	30	77	Brendan Gaughan	Penske-Jasper Racing	Dodge	74	7	transmission	66	$61,240
35	21	16	Greg Biffle	Roush Racing	Ford	71	0	engine	58	$61,175
36	19	40	Sterling Marlin	Chip Ganassi Racing	Dodge	50	0	crash	55	$86,100
37	28	0	Ward Burton	Haas CNC Racing	Chevrolet	47	0	engine	52	$53,050
38	40	89	Morgan Shepherd	Shepherd Racing Ventures	Dodge	42	0	rear end	49	$52,975
39	20	5	Terry Labonte	Hendrick Motorsports	Chevrolet	36	0	engine	46	$79,665
40	1	48	Jimmie Johnson	Hendrick Motorsports	Chevrolet	23	1	engine	48	$72,640
41	36	50	Todd Bodine	Arnold Motorsports	Dodge	7	0	brakes	40	$52,780
42	38	4	Jimmy Spencer	Morgan–McClure Motorsports	Chevrolet	2	0	engine	37	$52,720
43	39	98	Larry Gunselman	Mach 1 Motorsports	Ford	2	0	transmission	34	$52,039
Official race results

Previous race: 2004 Brickyard 400	NASCAR Nextel Cup Series; 2004 season	Next race: 2004 GFS Marketplace 400
