= 2010 Heluva Good! Sour Cream Dips at the Glen =

2010 Heluva Good! Sour Cream Dips at The Glen
Race details
- Race 22 of 36 in the 2010 NASCAR Sprint Cup Series
- The 2010 Heluva Good! Sour Cream Dips at The Glen program cover, featuring Tony Stewart. ¨NASCAR Kicks Esses!¨
- Date: August 8, 2010
- Location: Watkins Glen International Watkins Glen, New York
- Course: Permanent racing facility
- Course length: 2.454 miles (5.43 km)
- Distance: 90 laps, 220.5 mi (354.9 km)
- Weather: Mostly sunny with a high around 84; wind out of the SSW at 6 mph. Chance of precipitation: 10%.
- Average speed: 91.967 miles per hour (148.007 km/h)

Pole position
Driver	(United States) Carl Edwards	Roush Fenway Racing
- Time: 1:10.882

Most laps led
Driver	(Colombia) Juan Pablo Montoya	Earnhardt Ganassi Racing
- Laps: 74

Winner
No. 42	(Colombia) Juan Pablo Montoya	Earnhardt Ganassi

Television in the United States
- Network: ESPN
- Announcers: Marty Reid, Dale Jarrett and Andy Petree
- Nielsen ratings: 3.6 (rating); 4.931 million

The 2010 Heluva Good! Sour Cream Dips at The Glen was a NASCAR Sprint Cup Series stock car race that was held on August 8, 2010, at Watkins Glen International in Watkins Glen, New York. Contested over 90 laps, it was the twenty-second race of the 2010 Sprint Cup Series season and the second of two road course competitions on the schedule. The race was won by Juan Pablo Montoya, for the Earnhardt Ganassi Racing team. Kurt Busch finished second, and Marcos Ambrose, who started eleventh, clinched third.

Conditions were sunny at the start of the race. Pole position driver Carl Edwards maintained his lead on the first lap, but Jamie McMurray, who had started in the second position on the grid, took the lead before the fifth lap was over. Afterward, Montoya became the leader and would eventually lead a total of 74 laps, more than any other driver. During the final twenty laps, Montoya maintained the lead after multiple cautions. During the final lap, Kurt Busch was gaining on Montoya, but Montoya maintained his position to win his first race of the season.

The race logo for the Heluva Good! Sour Cream Dips at The Glen.

There were five cautions and ten lead changes among five different drivers throughout the course of the race. Montoya's win was his first of the season and the second of his career. The result moved him up two spots to nineteenth in the Drivers' Championship, 774 points behind of leader Kevin Harvick and 35 ahead of Martin Truex Jr. Chevrolet maintained its lead in the Manufacturers' Championship, twenty-seven points ahead of Toyota and fifty-six ahead of Ford, with fourteen races remaining in the season.

== Race report ==
=== Background ===
The layout of Watkins Glen International NASCAR uses.

Watkins Glen International is one of two road courses to hold NASCAR races, the other being Infineon Raceway. The standard short road course at Watkins Glen International is an 11-turn course that is 2.45 miles (3.94 km) long; the track was modified in 1992, adding the Inner Loop, which lengthened the long course to 3.4 miles (5.5 km) and the short course to the current length of 2.45 miles (3.94 km).

Before the race, Kevin Harvick led the Drivers' Championship with 3,080 points, and Jeff Gordon stood in second with 2,891. Denny Hamlin was third in the Drivers' Championship with 2,820 points, Jimmie Johnson was fourth with 2,803, and Jeff Burton was in fifth with 2,757. In the Manufacturers' Championship, Chevrolet was leading with 149 points, 22 points ahead of their rival Toyota. Ford, with 99 points, was 12 points ahead of Dodge in the battle for third.

=== Practice and qualifying ===
Two practice sessions were held before the Sunday race—both on Friday. The first session lasted 110 minutes, and the Friday afternoon session ran for 80 minutes. During the first practice session, Greg Biffle was the quickest with a time of 1:12.205. Hamlin and Paul Menard followed in the second and third positions, but were ahead of Burton and Kurt Busch in fourth and fifth. In the Friday afternoon practice session, Biffle remained the quickest with a fastest lap time of 1:11.092. Juan Pablo Montoya followed in the second position, less than a second faster than Marcos Ambrose and Kurt Busch in third and fourth. Harvick placed fifth with a fastest lap time three-tenths of a second off Biffle's pace. Tony Stewart, who won this race in 2009, only managed sixth.

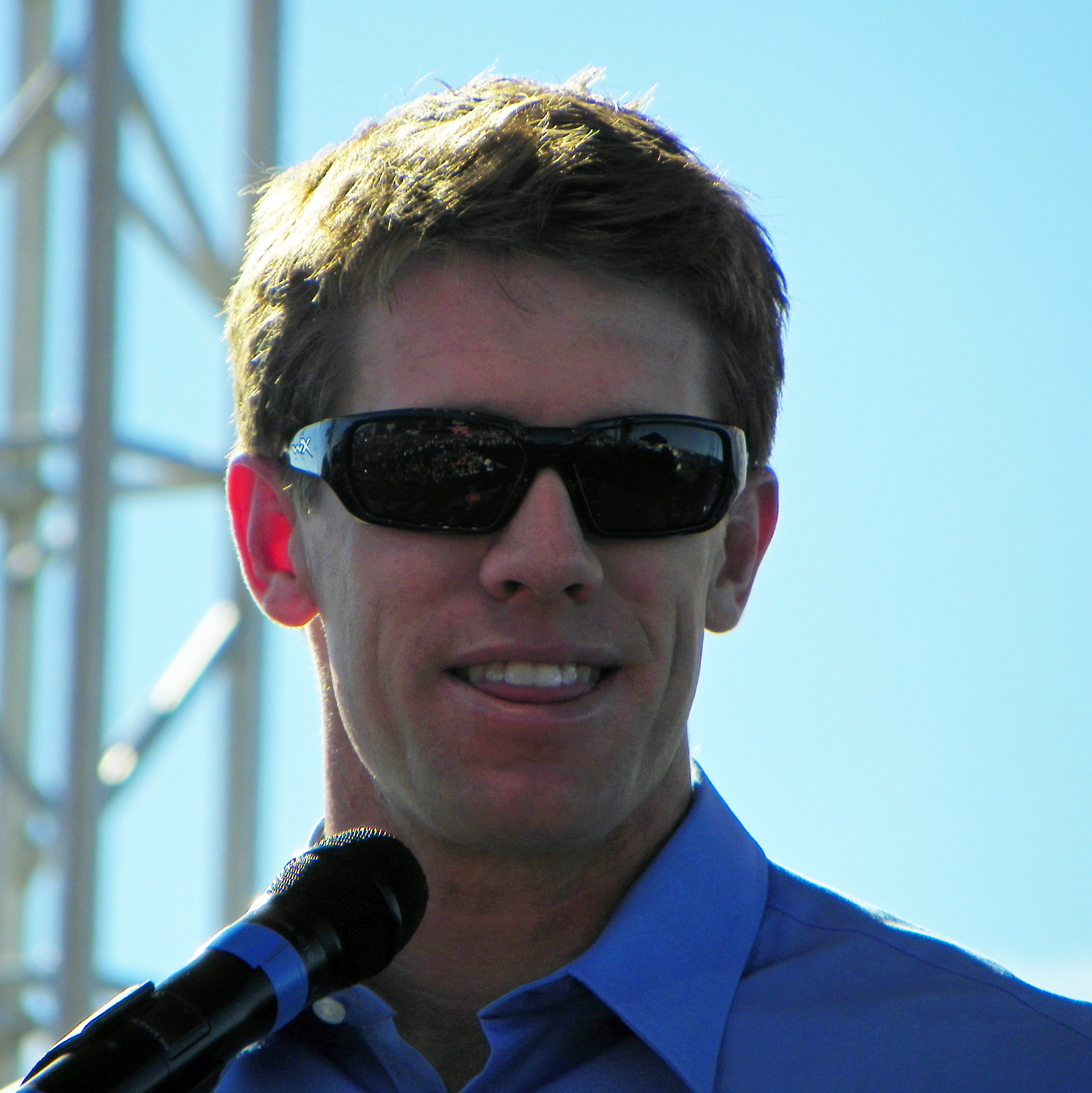
Carl Edwards clinched his fifth career pole position with a time of 1:10.882

During qualifying, forty-six cars were entered, but only forty-three were able to race because of NASCAR's qualifying procedure. Carl Edwards clinched his fifth career pole position, with a time of 1:10.882. He was joined on the front row of the grid by Jamie McMurray. Montoya qualified third, A. J. Allmendinger took fourth, and Kurt Busch started fifth, after being scored fourth in the practice sessions. The three drivers that did not qualify were J. J. Yeley, Dave Blaney, and Tony Ave.

=== Race summary ===
The race, the twenty-second out of a total of thirty-six in the season, began at 1 p.m. EDT and was televised live in the United States on ESPN. Conditions were sunny with a high of 80 °F (27 °C), making the track potentially slippery. Dan Fife, of Bentley Creek Wesleyan Church, began pre-race ceremonies, by giving the invocation. Next, American Idol runner-up, Bo Bice performed the national anthem, and Heluva Good! senior vice president of operations, Scott Blake gave the command for drivers to start their engines. During the pace laps, Kyle Busch had to go to pit lane because of problems with his race car.

Edwards held the lead going through the first corner with McMurray behind him. Going through the esses McMurray ran Edwards off track, but Edwards remained the leader. Edwards vacated the first position was filled by McMurray after Edwards reported that his car was tight. On lap 5, Biffle moved into the fourth position, as Elliott Sadler made a scheduled pit stop for fuel. One lap later, Montoya passed McMurray for the first position. On lap 9, Allmendinger passed McMurray for the second position. Afterward, Ambrose passed Edwards for fourth.

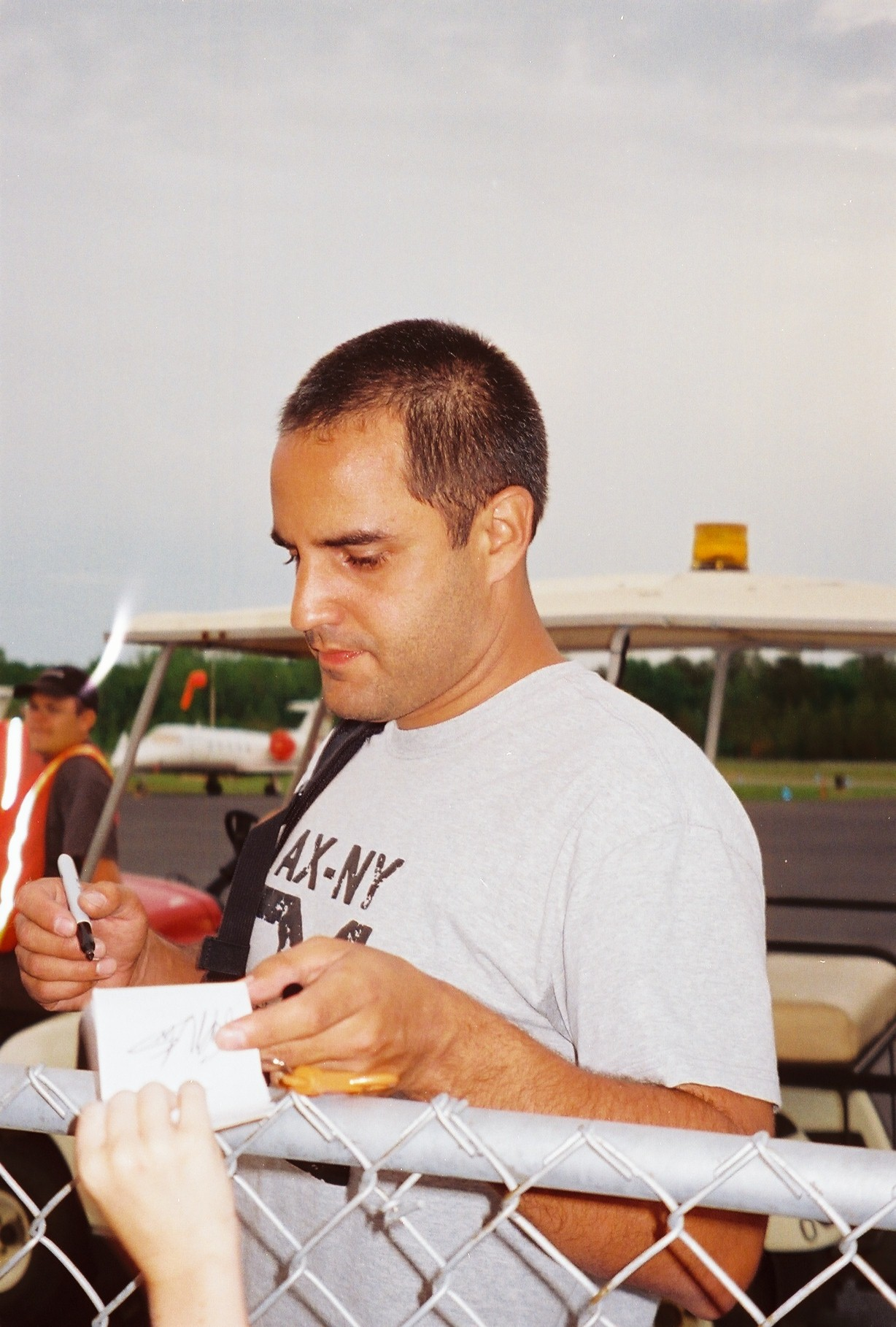
Juan Pablo Montoya led the most laps with 74 and won the race.

On the 24, Ambrose emerged in second, and would end up right behind Montoya six laps later. On the same lap, the first full course caution was given because P. J. Jones stalled on the track.

On lap 41, Ambrose emerged in the first position, after passing Montoya. Two laps later, the second caution was given because Bobby Labonte and Joe Nemechek were involved in an accident in the Inner Loop. On the restart, Ambrose led, but going through turn one, Ambrose fell to the fourth position, as Montoya became the leader. Afterward, Ambrose passed Allmendinger for the third position. On lap 49, Martin Truex Jr. had a tire rubbing against the car, which caused him to spin as the race resumed. Ambrose moved into the second position, after passing Kurt Busch. By lap 56, Montoya's lead had dropped under one second ahead of Ambrose. Green flag pit stops began on lap 57, as Clint Bowyer drove to pit lane. Next, Harvick and Hamlin had their pit stops. On lap 60, Montoya and Ambrose made pit stops, as Ryan Newman became the leader. One lap later, Bowyer drove to the garage, as the third caution waved because of debris from his car.

On lap 65, Montoya led to the green flag. Two laps later, Boris Said spun and collided with the guardrail, which prompted the fourth caution to come out. The green flag waved on lap 70 with Montoya the leader, but the fifth caution came out two laps later, as Johnson spun sideways, and collided with the wall. The accident also involved Hamlin, who collided with Johnson. The green flag waved on lap 75 with Montoya leading the field back up to speed. On lap 77, Ambrose emerged in second, after passing Kurt Busch. Montoya, however, maintained the lead all the way to take his second win of his NASCAR career. Kurt Busch followed in second, ahead Ambrose in third, Allmendinger in fourth, and Edwards in fifth. The race had a total of five cautions and ten lead changes among five different drivers.

=== Post-race ===
"We've lost a lot of them, gave away a lot of them. It gets frustrating, everybody fighting. There's so many things I have to learn. I still make a lot of mistakes. It's experience. We've just got to learn from it."

— Montoya speaking after the race.

Montoya appeared in Victory Lane after his victory lap to start celebrating his first win of the season, and his second in his career. His win broke a 113 race losing streak, which started in 2007. Following his win, he added, "The last few weeks have been really frustrating for the whole team because we’ve been so close to victory. (It) seemed to keep slipping away."

Following the race, Kurt Busch stated, "To come up short just to Montoya, to beat Ambrose, racing with those two world-class guys, it was fun. I learned quite a bit." In the subsequent press conference, Montoya said, "Last year, we were so hung up on making the Chase that it was all about numbers, it wasn't about being fast or slow." After his third-place finish, Ambrose stated: "We tried hard all day. Juan drove a heck of a race. He wasn't giving me anything. I just wore out everything trying to pass him. He's really hard to pass. It's going to be a big battle. I'm going to see if I can force him into a mistake. I just want to be clean until the end."

After expressing his win, Montoya said, "I think from Day One we worked so hard to bring the performance of the cars to where they are now. I think that really has helped. It’s been frustrating because you could see the performance get better and better. Even last year in the Chase, (I) finished second, finished third, finished second, finished third. That freaking win would never come, so it was getting frustrating." The race result left Harvick leading the Drivers' Championship with 3,210 points. Jeff Gordon, who finished tenth, was second on 3,025, 130 points ahead of Burton and 133 ahead of Kurt Busch. In the Manufacturers' Championship, Chevrolet maintained their lead with 158 points. Toyota remained second with 131 points. Ford followed with 102 points, nine points ahead of Dodge in fourth. A total of 90,000 people attended the race, while 4.931 million watched it on television.

== Results ==
=== Qualifying ===
Grid	No.	Driver	Team	Manufacturer	Time	Speed
1	99	Carl Edwards	Roush Fenway Racing	Ford	1:10.882	124.432
2	1	Jamie McMurray	Earnhardt Ganassi Racing	Chevrolet	1:11.236	123.814
3	42	Juan Pablo Montoya	Earnhardt Ganassi Racing	Chevrolet	1:11.302	123.699
4	43	A. J. Allmendinger	Richard Petty Motorsports	Ford	1:11.348	123.619
5	2	Kurt Busch	Penske Racing	Dodge	1:11.403	123.524
6	14	Tony Stewart	Stewart–Haas Racing	Chevrolet	1:11.458	123.429
7	16	Greg Biffle	Roush Fenway Racing	Ford	1:11.469	123.410
8	82	Scott Speed	Red Bull Racing Team	Toyota	1:11.493	123.369
9	48	Jimmie Johnson	Hendrick Motorsports	Chevrolet	1:11.518	123.326
10	18	Kyle Busch	Joe Gibbs Racing	Toyota	1:11.571	123.234
11	47	Marcos Ambrose	JTG Daugherty Racing	Toyota	1:11.611	123.165
12	77	Sam Hornish Jr.	Penske Racing	Dodge	1:11.648	123.102
13	83	Boris Said	Red Bull Racing Team	Toyota	1:11.662	123.078
14	11	Denny Hamlin	Joe Gibbs Racing	Toyota	1:11.744	122.937
15	7	Robby Gordon	Robby Gordon Motorsports	Toyota	1:11.795	122.850
16	24	Jeff Gordon	Hendrick Motorsports	Chevrolet	1:11.834	122.783
17	26	Patrick Carpentier	Latitude 43 Motorsports	Ford	1:11.921	122.635
18	20	Joey Logano	Joe Gibbs Racing	Toyota	1:11.952	122.582
19	39	Ryan Newman	Stewart–Haas Racing	Chevrolet	1:11.965	122.560
20	29	Kevin Harvick	Richard Childress Racing	Chevrolet	1:11.990	122.517
21	36	Ron Fellows	Tommy Baldwin Racing	Chevrolet	1:12.095	122.339
22	31	Jeff Burton	Richard Childress Racing	Chevrolet	1:12.113	122.308
23	98	Paul Menard	Richard Petty Motorsports	Ford	1:12.126	122.286
24	5	Mark Martin	Hendrick Motorsports	Chevrolet	1:12.171	122.210
25	56	Martin Truex Jr.	Michael Waltrip Racing	Toyota	1:12.325	121.950
26	55	Michael McDowell	Prism Motorsports	Toyota	1:12.413	121.801
27	78	Regan Smith	Furniture Row Racing	Chevrolet	1:12.419	121.791
28	13	Max Papis	Germain Racing	Toyota	1:12.461	121.721
29	09	Bobby Labonte	Phoenix Racing	Chevrolet	1:12.525	121.613
30	00	David Reutimann	Michael Waltrip Racing	Toyota	1:12.576	121.528
31	17	Matt Kenseth	Roush Fenway Racing	Ford	1:12.406	121.406
32	12	Brad Keselowski	Penske Racing	Dodge	1:12.650	121.404
33	71	Andy Lally	TRG Motorsports	Chevrolet	1:12.689	121.339
34	33	Clint Bowyer	Richard Childress Racing	Chevrolet	1:12.728	121.274
35	6	David Ragan	Roush Fenway Racing	Ford	1:12.885	121.013
36	9	Kasey Kahne	Richard Petty Motorsports	Ford	1:13.135	120.599
37	87	Joe Nemechek	NEMCO Motorsports	Toyota	1:13.171	120.540
38	19	Elliott Sadler	Richard Petty Motorsports	Ford	1:13.202	120.489
39	07	P. J. Jones	Robby Gordon Motorsports	Toyota	1:13.341	120.260
40	88	Dale Earnhardt Jr.	Hendrick Motorsports	Chevrolet	1:13.396	120.170
41	37	Travis Kvapil	Front Row Motorsports	Ford	1:14.126	118.987
42	34	Kevin Conway	Front Row Motorsports	Ford	1:14.561	118.292
43	38	David Gilliland	Front Row Motorsports	Ford	1:13.370	120.213
Failed to qualify
44	46	J. J. Yeley	Whitney Motorsports	Dodge	1:13.876	119.389
45	66	Dave Blaney	Prism Motorsports	Toyota	1:13.957	119.258
46	35	Tony Ave	Tri-Star Motorsports	Chevrolet	1:14.062	119.089

=== Race results ===
Pos	No.	Driver	Team	Manufacturer	Laps	Points
1	42	Juan Pablo Montoya	Earnhardt Ganassi Racing	Chevrolet	90	195
2	2	Kurt Busch	Penske Racing	Dodge	90	170
3	47	Marcos Ambrose	JTG Daugherty Racing	Toyota	90	170
4	43	A. J. Allmendinger	Richard Petty Motorsports	Ford	90	160
5	99	Carl Edwards	Roush Fenway Racing	Ford	90	155
6	1	Jamie McMurray	Earnhardt Ganassi Racing	Chevrolet	90	155
7	14	Tony Stewart	Stewart–Haas Racing	Chevrolet	90	146
8	18	Kyle Busch	Joe Gibbs Racing	Toyota	90	142
9	31	Jeff Burton	Richard Childress Racing	Chevrolet	90	138
10	24	Jeff Gordon	Hendrick Motorsports	Chevrolet	90	134
11	29	Kevin Harvick	Richard Childress Racing	Chevrolet	90	130
12	39	Ryan Newman	Stewart–Haas Racing	Chevrolet	90	132
13	17	Matt Kenseth	Roush Fenway Racing	Ford	90	124
14	77	Sam Hornish Jr.	Penske Racing	Dodge	90	121
15	56	Martin Truex Jr.	Michael Waltrip Racing	Toyota	90	118
16	98	Paul Menard	Richard Petty Motorsports	Ford	90	115
17	9	Kasey Kahne	Richard Petty Motorsports	Ford	90	112
18	71	Andy Lally	TRG Motorsports	Chevrolet	90	109
19	5	Mark Martin	Hendrick Motorsports	Chevrolet	90	111
20	12	Brad Keselowski	Penske Racing	Dodge	90	103
21	26	Patrick Carpentier	Latitude 43 Motorsports	Ford	90	100
22	13	Max Papis	Germain Racing	Toyota	90	97
23	00	David Reutimann	Michael Waltrip Racing	Toyota	90	94
24	16	Greg Biffle	Roush Fenway Racing	Ford	90	91
25	6	David Ragan	Roush Fenway Racing	Ford	90	88
26	88	Dale Earnhardt Jr.	Hendrick Motorsports	Chevrolet	90	85
27	38	David Gilliland	Front Row Motorsports	Ford	90	82
28	48	Jimmie Johnson	Hendrick Motorsports	Chevrolet	90	79
29	19	Elliott Sadler	Richard Petty Motorsports	Ford	90	76
30	37	Travis Kvapil	Front Row Motorsports	Ford	90	73
31	34	Kevin Conway	Front Row Motorsports	Ford	90	70
32	33	Clint Bowyer	Richard Childress Racing	Chevrolet	89	67
33	20	Joey Logano	Joe Gibbs Racing	Toyota	88	64
34	78	Regan Smith	Furniture Row Racing	Chevrolet	84	61
35	09	Bobby Labonte	Phoenix Racing	Chevrolet	84	58
36	7	Robby Gordon	Robby Gordon Motorsports	Toyota	72	55
37	11	Denny Hamlin	Joe Gibbs Racing	Toyota	70	52
38	83	Boris Said	Red Bull Racing Team	Toyota	65	49
39	87	Joe Nemechek	NEMCO Motorsports	Toyota	54	46
40	36	Ron Fellows	Tommy Baldwin Racing	Chevrolet	46	43
41	07	P. J. Jones	Robby Gordon Motorsports	Toyota	36	40
42	55	Michael McDowell	Prism Motorsports	Toyota	35	37
43	82	Scott Speed	Red Bull Racing Team	Toyota	28	34

== Standings after the race ==
Drivers' Championship standings
Rank	+/–	Driver	Points
1		Kevin Harvick	3,210
2		Jeff Gordon	3,025 (–185)
3	2	Jeff Burton	2,895 (–315)
4	3	Kurt Busch	2,892 (–318)
5	1	Jimmie Johnson	2,882 (–328)
6	3	Denny Hamlin	2,872 (–338)
7	1	Kyle Busch	2,866 (–344)
8		Tony Stewart	2,865 (–345)
9	1	Carl Edwards	2,821 (–389)
10	1	Matt Kenseth	2,806 (–404)
11		Greg Biffle	2,743 (–467)
12	1	Mark Martin	2,641 (–569)

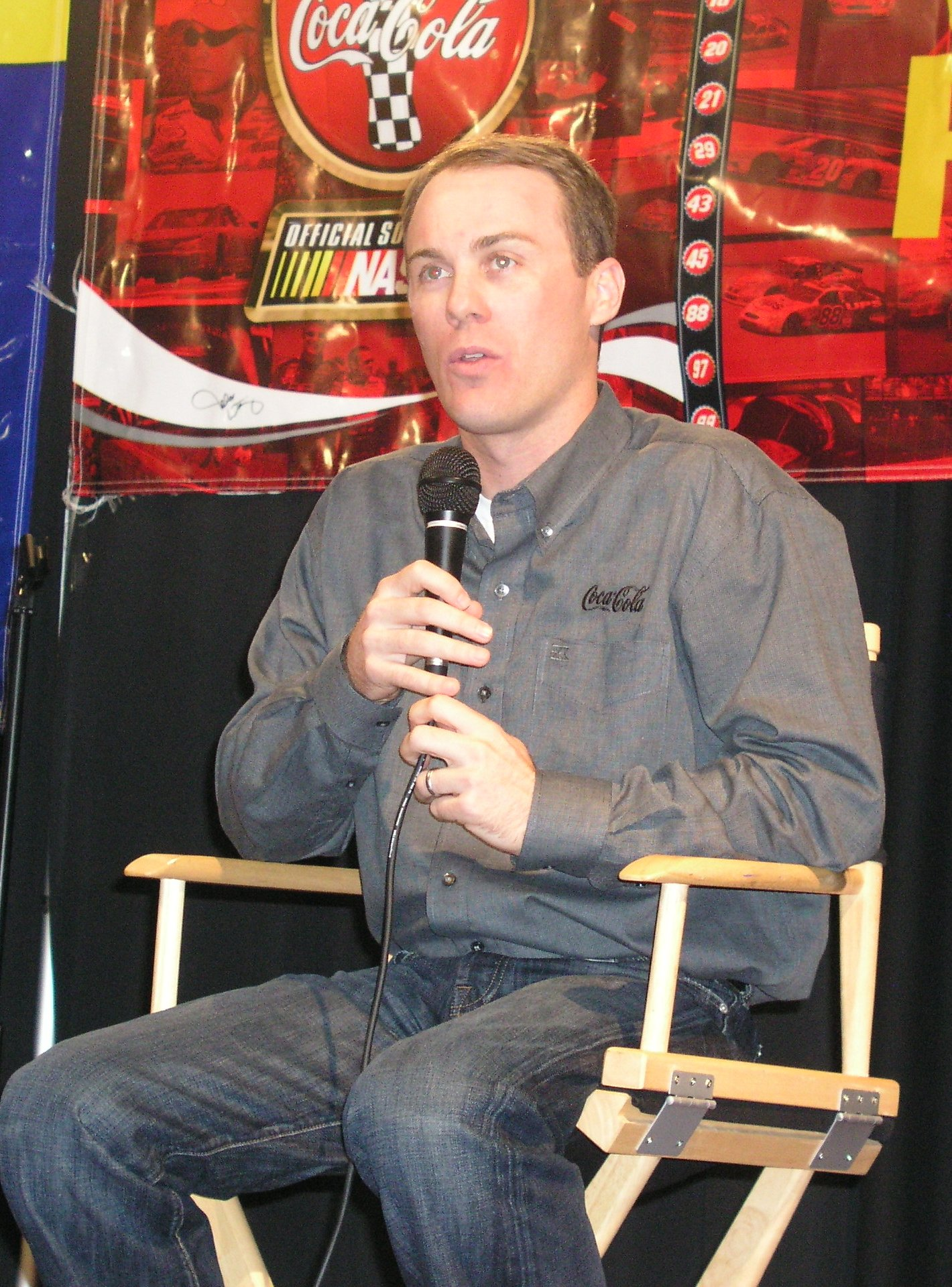
Kevin Harvick remained the Drivers' Championship leader after finishing eleventh in the race.

Manufacturers' Championship standings
Rank	+/–	Manufacturer	Points
1		Chevrolet	158
2		Toyota	131 (–27)
3		Ford	102 (–56)
4		Dodge	93 (–65)

- Note: Only the top twelve positions are included for the Drivers' Championship standings.

Previous race: 2010 Sunoco Red Cross Pennsylvania 500	Sprint Cup Series; 2010 season	Next race: 2010 Carfax 400
