= Hover Motorsports =

Former NASCAR team

- Owner: Stan Hover
- Series: NASCAR Nextel Cup Series
- Race drivers: Andy Hillenburg, Carl Long, Mario Gosselin, Randy LaJoie, Ted Christopher, Tony Ave
- Opened: 1992
- Closed: 2010

Career
- Latest race: 2004 Mountain Dew Southern 500
- Drivers' Championships: 0
- Race victories: 0
- Pole positions: 0

Hover Motorsports was a NASCAR Nextel Cup Series team. They last attempted a race at the 2006 Daytona 500, when they fielded the No. 80 Roadloans.com Ford Taurus for Carl Long, but failed to qualify. They were planning to partner with Peak Fitness Racing for the 2006 season, but that deal fell through. The team has also run races in the past in the ARCA RE/MAX Series.

== Winston Cup ==
Hover began racing NASCAR in 1992. The team made its first start at the AC Delco 500 with Dave Blaney driving with sponsorship from Daffron's Body Shop. He started 36th and finished 31st after suffering handling problems. Hover did not make another start until the 1994 Daytona 500, when the team finished 19th with Jimmy Horton driving. They also ran another race at Charlotte Motor Speedway with Joe Ruttman. He finished 23rd with Park Ohio Industries. Ruttman returned to run the 1995 Daytona 500, finishing nineteenth.

After Ruttman failed to qualify for the 1996 Daytona 500, Hover did not make another NASCAR attempt until the Daytona 500 in 1998, when Mike Ciochetti drove. He too did not make the field. Andy Hillenburg attempted Daytona with Hover in 1999, missing the race as well. Gary Bradberry came on board for a pair of races in 1999, failing to qualify for those. Following the 1999 season, Hover constructed a new shop and hired Morgan Shepherd to attempt the Brickyard 400, but he too, fell short of qualifying for the race. After he DNQ'd for Daytona in 2001, he was released.

In 2002, Hover returned with sponsorship from Hooters and Kirk Shelmerdine driving. When Shelmerdine DNQ'd at Daytona, he and Hooters left for Brett Bodine Racing, leaving the team once again driverless. They did not run in 2003, but returned in 2004 due to a lack of teams competing. With new sponsor Commercial Truck & Trailer, Hillenburg drove five races for them, posting a best finish of 34th at North Carolina Speedway. Following him, Randy LaJoie drove one race for them at Richmond International Raceway. Tony Ave, Carl Long, and Ted Christopher drove for one-race deals, before Mario Gosselin finished the season for the team.

The team would stir up controversy about field fillers, when during the 2004 Carolina Dodge Dealers 400, Andy Hillenburg, who was last at the time, was bumped by Tony Stewart heading into Turn 1, who was about to lap Hillenburg. Jeff Gordon, who was behind Stewart, could not slow down enough to avoid Hillenburg and eventually hit Hillenburg on the driver's side. Hillenburg said of the incident "I wiggled up in front of the, uh, the 20 car there and, uh, I mean... you know, you come in here and this is the big boys, and... a slow car and a fast car and... fast car hits the slow car and it's the slow car's fault and we'll go back and build us a faster car and some day we'll be back and be the faster car... I feel bad, it's a race car driver's worst nightmare to come out here and take out one of the heroes." Jeff Gordon, in a later interview at the race questioned if field fillers should be able to still compete in NASCAR, saying "I don't know what happened there with Andy getting spun, but I'll tell you what, there are a bunch of cars out there that do not belong out there. They're way off the pace. They're in the way. We almost had several wrecks before that, and I came on the radio and asked if NASCAR could take some guys off the track, not just because they're slow, but because they're in the way. This is a narrow, tight race track. It's a hard enough track to race with guys who are at speed. It's just frustrating right now... I think in qualifying, maybe there's a certain percent, like Formula One has a 107 percent rule. This is the NEXTEL Cup Series, man. I mean, this is the best of the best. We don't need to have cars there that are just out there making a qualifying attempt and making the race. We talk about it all the time. [NASCAR has] tried to address it with a minimum speed, but maybe the minimum speed needs to be adjusted. Everyone is caught up in this 43 cars [minimum grid size], but I don't care if there are 43 cars. I don't know if the people in the stands really care if there are 43 cars. We need cars out there that are competitive and that need to be out there competing for position, not just riding around."

Hover attempted the 2005 Daytona 500 with Andy Belmont driving with sponsorship from Bootie Beer, but the team did not qualify. A lack of sponsorship kept the team from competing until the Ford 400, when they ran with a Dodge Charger and Aaron's sponsorship, with Long driving. The team did not qualify after a wreck in qualifying. Long and Hover partnered again for the 2006 Daytona 500 with Roadloans sponsorship, but a sour engine caused them to miss the race. The team has been inactive since Roadloans departed, and the crew assisted Long and his No. 46 Cupp Motorsports team at the end of the season. The team would officially close in 2010 after five further attempts in ARCA (2007 at Pocono 2 and Nashville 2 with Wayman Wittman and John Gill at Springfield, 2008 at Toledo 2 with Jake Francis, and 2010 at Daytona with Brad Lloyd; Francis and Lloyd did not qualify).

== Drivers ==
- No drivers competed full-time for Hover Motorsports.
- (United States) Dave Blaney (1992)
- (United States) Jimmy Horton (1994 Daytona 500; DNQ in 1993 at Dover & Pocono in June, and Richmond in September, DNQ in 1994 at Atlanta, Talladega, & Michigan)
- (United States) Joe Ruttman (1994-1996; DNQ in 1994 at Daytona in July, Talladega, Richmond, & Atlanta, DNQ in 1995 at Indianapolis, DNQ for 1996 Daytona 500)
- (United States) Andy Hillenburg (limited races in 2004; DNQ for 1999 Daytona 500, DNQ in 2004 at Texas, Charlotte, & Pocono)
- (United States) Gary Bradberry (DNQ in 1999 at Indianapolis & Charlotte)
- (United States) Morgan Shepherd (DNQ for 2001 Daytona 500)
- (United States) Kirk Shelmerdine (DNQ for 2002 Daytona 500)
- (United States) Randy LaJoie (2004 at Richmond)
- (United States) Carl Long (2004; DNQ in 2004 at Richmond, Talladega, & Homestead, DNQ for 2006 Daytona 500)
- (United States) Tony Ave (2004 at Watkins Glen; also DNQ at Bristol)
- (United States) Ted Christopher (2004 at Loudon)
- (United States) Derrike Cope (DNQ in 2004 at Dover)
- (Canada) Mario Gosselin (2004; also DNQ at Phoenix)
- (United States) Andy Belmont (DNQ in 2004 at Atlanta; for 2005 Daytona 500)

== Motorsports career results ==
=== NASCAR ===
(key) (Bold – Pole position awarded by qualifying time. Italics – Pole position earned by points standings or practice time. * – Most laps led.)

==== Car No. 80 results ====
NASCAR Nextel Cup Series results
Year	Driver	No.	Make	1	2	3	4	5	6	7	8	9	10	11	12	13	14	15	16	17	18	19	20	21	22	23	24	25	26	27	28	29	30	31	32	33	34	35	36	Owners	Pts
1992	Dave Blaney	80	Pontiac	DAY	CAR	RCH	ATL	DAR	BRI	NWS	MAR	TAL	CLT	DOV	SON	POC	MCH	DAY	POC	TAL	GLN	MCH	BRI	DAR	RCH	DOV	MAR	NWS	CLT	CAR; 31	PHO	ATL; DNQ								(Note: unknown)	
1993	Jimmy Horton	80	Ford	DAY	CAR	RCH	ATL	DAR	BRI	NWS	MAR	TAL	SON	CLT	DOV; DNQ	POC	MCH	DAY	NHA	POC	TAL	GLN	MCH	BRI	DAR	RCH; DNQ	DOV	MAR	NWS	CLT	CAR	PHO	ATL								
1994	Jimmy Horton	80	Ford	DAY; 19	CAR	RCH	ATL; DNQ	DAR	BRI	NWS	MAR	TAL; DNQ	SON	CLT	DOV	POC	MCH; DNQ																								
1994	Joe Ruttman	80	Ford															DAY; DNQ	NHA	POC	TAL; DNQ	IND	GLN	MCH	BRI	DAR	RCH; DNQ	DOV	MAR	NWS	CLT; 23	CAR	PHO	ATL; DNQ							
1995	Joe Ruttman	80	Ford	DAY; 19	CAR	RCH	ATL	DAR	BRI	NWS	MAR	TAL	SON	CLT	DOV	POC	MCH	DAY	NHA	POC	TAL	IND; DNQ	GLN	MCH	BRI	DAR	RCH	DOV	MAR	NWS	CLT	CAR	PHO	ATL							
1996	Joe Ruttman	80	Ford	DAY; DNQ	CAR	RCH	ATL	DAR	BRI	NWS	MAR	TAL	SON	CLT	DOV	POC	MCH	DAY	NHA	POC	TAL	IND	GLN	MCH	BRI	DAR	RCH	DOV	MAR	NWS	CLT	CAR	PHO	ATL							
1998	Mike Ciochetti	80	Ford	DAY; DNQ	CAR	LVS	ATL	DAR	BRI	TEX	MAR	TAL	CAL	CLT	DOV	RCH	MCH	POC	SON	NHA	POC	IND	GLN	MCH	BRI	NHA	DAR	RCH	DOV	MAR										61st	79
1998	Andy Hillenburg	80	Ford																												CLT; DNQ	TAL	DAY	PHO	CAR; DNQ	ATL; DNQ				61st	79
1999	Andy Hillenburg	80	Ford	DAY; DNQ	CAR	LVS	ATL	DAR	TEX	BRI	MAR	TAL	CAL	RCH	CLT	DOV	MCH	POC	SON	DAY	NHA	POC																		64th	33
1999	Gary Bradberry	80	Ford																				IND; DNQ	GLN	MCH	BRI	DAR	RCH	NHA	DOV	MAR	CLT; DNQ	TAL	CAR	PHO	HOM	ATL			64th	33
2000	Morgan Shepherd	80	Ford	DAY	CAR	LVS	ATL	DAR	BRI	TEX	MAR	TAL	CAL	RCH	CLT	DOV	MCH	POC	SON	DAY	NHA	POC	IND	GLN	MCH	BRI	DAR	RCH	NHA	DOV	MAR	CLT	TAL	CAR	PHO	HOM	ATL; DNQ			71st	16
2001	Morgan Shepherd	80	Ford	DAY; DNQ	CAR	LVS	ATL	DAR	BRI	TEX	MAR	TAL	CAL	RCH	CLT	DOV	MCH	POC	SON	DAY	CHI	NHA	POC	IND	GLN	MCH	BRI	DAR	RCH	DOV	KAN	CLT	MAR	TAL	PHO	CAR	HOM	ATL	NHA	71st	10
2002	Kirk Shelmerdine	80	Ford	DAY; DNQ	CAR	LVS	ATL	DAR	BRI	TEX	MAR	TAL	CAL	RCH	CLT	DOV	POC	MCH	SON	DAY	CHI	NHA	POC	IND	GLN	MCH	BRI	DAR	RCH	NHA	DOV	KAN	TAL	CLT	MAR	ATL	CAR	PHO	HOM	81st	10
2004	Andy Hillenburg	80	Ford	DAY	CAR; 34	LVS	ATL; 42	DAR; 42	BRI; 43	TEX; DNQ	MAR; 42	TAL	CAL		CLT; DNQ	DOV	POC; DNQ	MCH	SON	DAY	CHI	NHA																		46th	670
2004	Randy LaJoie	80	Ford											RCH; 43																										46th	670
2004	Carl Long	80	Ford																				POC; 39	IND		MCH; 39						TAL; DNQ	KAN	CLT					HOM; DNQ	46th	670
2004	Tony Ave	80	Chevy																						GLN; 31															46th	670
2004	Tony Ave	80	Ford																								BRI; DNQ	CAL	RCH											46th	670
2004	Ted Christopher	80	Ford																											NHA; 43										46th	670
2004	Derrike Cope	80	Ford																												DOV; DNQ									46th	670
2004	Mario Gosselin	80	Ford																																MAR; 41		PHO; DNQ	DAR; 41		46th	670
2004	Andy Belmont	80	Ford																																	ATL; DNQ				46th	670
2005	Andy Belmont	80	Ford	DAY; DNQ	CAL	LVS	ATL	BRI	MAR	TEX	PHO	TAL	DAR	RCH	CLT	DOV	POC	MCH	SON	DAY	CHI	NHA	POC	IND	GLN	MCH	BRI	CAL	RCH	NHA	DOV	TAL	KAN	CLT	MAR	ATL	TEX	PHO		72nd	29
2005	Carl Long	80	Ford																																				HOM; DNQ	72nd	29
2006	Carl Long	80	Ford	DAY; DNQ	CAL	LVS	ATL	BRI	MAR	TEX	PHO	TAL	RCH	DAR	CLT	DOV	POC	MCH	SON	DAY	CHI	NHA	POC	IND	GLN	MCH	BRI	CAL	RCH	NHA	DOV	KAN	TAL	CLT	MAR	ATL	TEX	PHO	HOM	77th	1

Footnotes
