= 2010 Irwin Tools Night Race =

Race details
- Race 24 of 36 in the 2010 NASCAR Sprint Cup Series
- The 2010 Irwin Tools Night Race program cover, celebrating the 100th NASCAR Sprint Cup Series race held at Bristol Motor Speedway. Artwork made by Sam Bass. "100!"
- Date: August 21, 2010
- Location: Bristol Motor Speedway, Bristol, Tennessee
- Course: Permanent racing facility
- Course length: 0.533 miles (0.858 km)
- Distance: 500 laps, 266.5 mi (428.89 km)
- Weather: Isolated thunderstorms with a high around 86; wind out of the SW at 6 mph. Chance of precipitation 30%.
- Average speed: 99.071 miles per hour (159.439 km/h)

Pole position
Driver	Jimmie Johnson	Hendrick Motorsports
- Time: 15.540

Most laps led
Driver	Kyle Busch	Joe Gibbs Racing
- Laps: 282

Winner
No. 18	Kyle Busch	Joe Gibbs Racing

Television in the United States
- Network: American Broadcasting Company
- Announcers: Marty Reid, Dale Jarrett and Andy Petree

The 2010 Irwin Tools Night Race was a NASCAR Sprint Cup Series stock car race that was held on August 21, 2010, at Bristol Motor Speedway in Bristol, Tennessee. Contested over 500 laps, it was the twenty-fourth race of the 2010 Sprint Cup Series season. Kyle Busch of Joe Gibbs Racing won the race, while David Reutimann finished second, and Jamie McMurray clinched third.

Pole position driver Jimmie Johnson maintained his lead on the first lap to begin the race, as Carl Edwards, who started in the second position on the grid, remained behind him. Afterward, Kyle Busch became the leader, and would eventually lead to the race high of 282 laps. On lap 163, early race leader Johnson had collided with Juan Pablo Montoya; when he returned to the track he was seventy-seven laps behind the leader. David Reutimann led after the final pit stops, ahead of Kyle Busch and Jamie McMurray. With seventy-one laps remaining, Kyle Busch passed Reutimann, holding the lead through to the race win.

There were seven cautions and seventeen lead changes among nine different drivers throughout the course of the race. It was Kyle Busch's third win of the season and the nineteenth of his career. The result moved him up five spots to third in the Drivers' Championship, 351 points behind of leader Kevin Harvick and fifty-seven ahead of Carl Edwards. Chevrolet maintained its lead in the Manufacturers' Championship, twenty-seven ahead of Toyota, sixty-three ahead of Ford and seventy-four ahead of Dodge with twelve races remaining in the season. A total of 155,000 people attended the race, while 5.842 million watched it on television.

The race logo used for the 2010 Irwin Tools Night Race.

With the win, Kyle Busch completed a historic Triple Threat sweep, winning in all three of the top NASCAR national series on the same weekend, winning the O'Reilly Auto Parts 200 in the Camping World Truck Series, the Food City 250 in the Nationwide Series and finishing with this win in the Sprint Cup Series.

== Report ==
=== Background ===
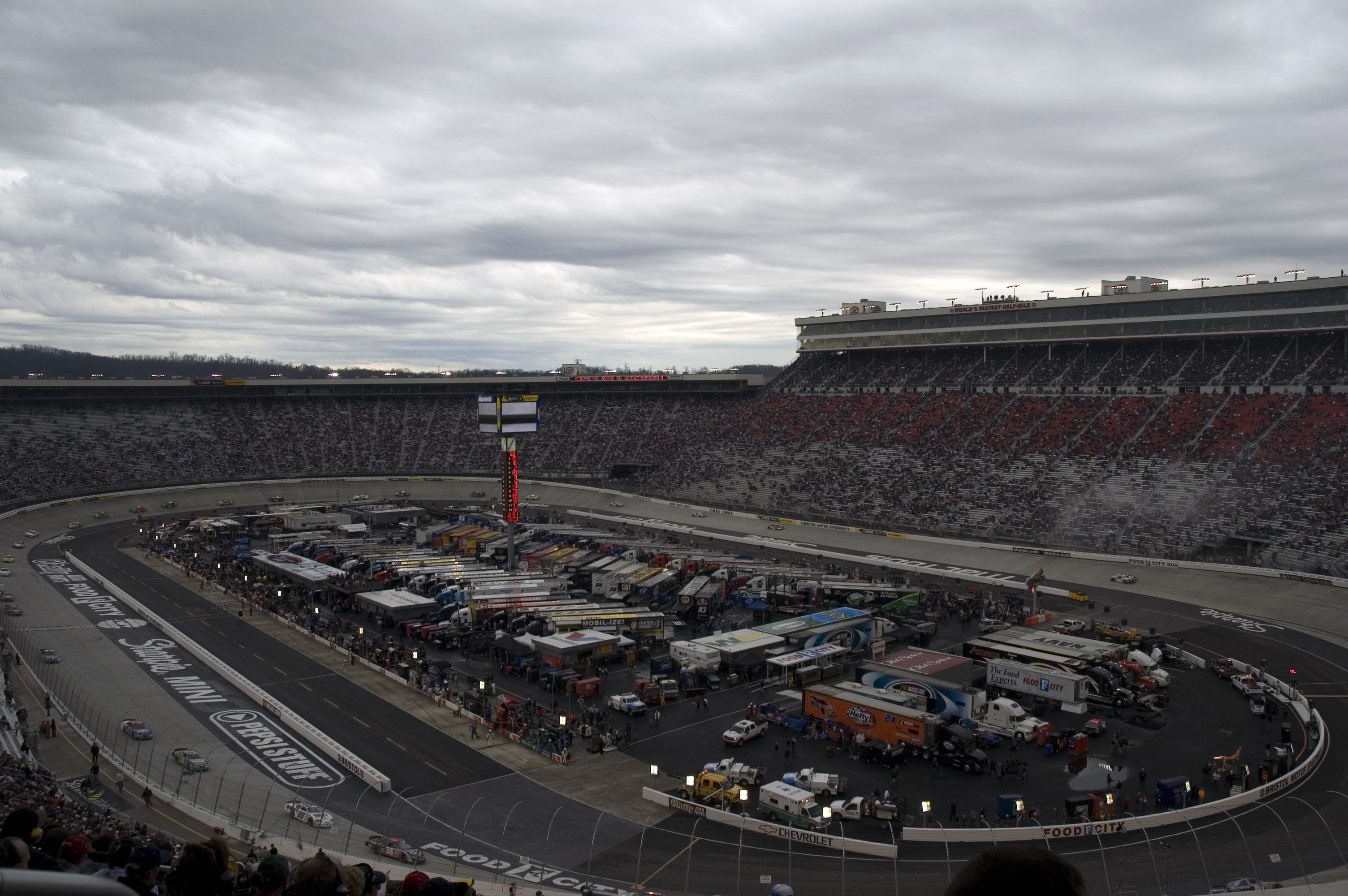
Bristol Motor Speedway, the race track where the race was held.

Bristol Motor Speedway is one of five short tracks to hold NASCAR races; the others are Dover International Speedway, Phoenix International Raceway, Richmond International Raceway, and Martinsville Speedway. The standard track at Bristol Motor Speedway is a four-turn short track oval that is 0.533 miles (0.858 km) long. The track's turns are banked from twenty-four to thirty degrees, while the front stretch, the location of the finish line, is banked from six to ten degrees. The back stretch also has banking from six to ten degrees.

Before the race, Kevin Harvick led the Drivers' Championship with 3,400 points, and Jeff Gordon stood in second with 3,107 points. Denny Hamlin was third in the Drivers' Championship with 3,047 points; Tony Stewart was fourth with 3,020 while Jimmie Johnson was in fifth with 3,014. In the Manufacturers' Championship, Chevrolet was leading with 167 points, thirty points ahead of their rival Toyota. Ford, with 106 points, was ten points ahead of Dodge in the battle for third.

=== Practice and qualifying ===
Two practice sessions was held before the Saturday race—both on Friday. The first session lasted 120 minutes, while the second session lasted 45 minutes. During the first practice session, David Gilliland was fastest, ahead of Robby Gordon and Dale Earnhardt Jr. in second and third respectively. Jeff Gordon was scored fourth, while A. J. Allmendinger was placed fifth, even though the latter had spun sideways twice in the session. In the second and final practice session, Ryan Newman was scored quickest, as Carl Edwards and Gilliland followed in the second and third positions. Jimmie Johnson was scored in the fourth position, while his teammate Jeff Gordon followed in fifth.

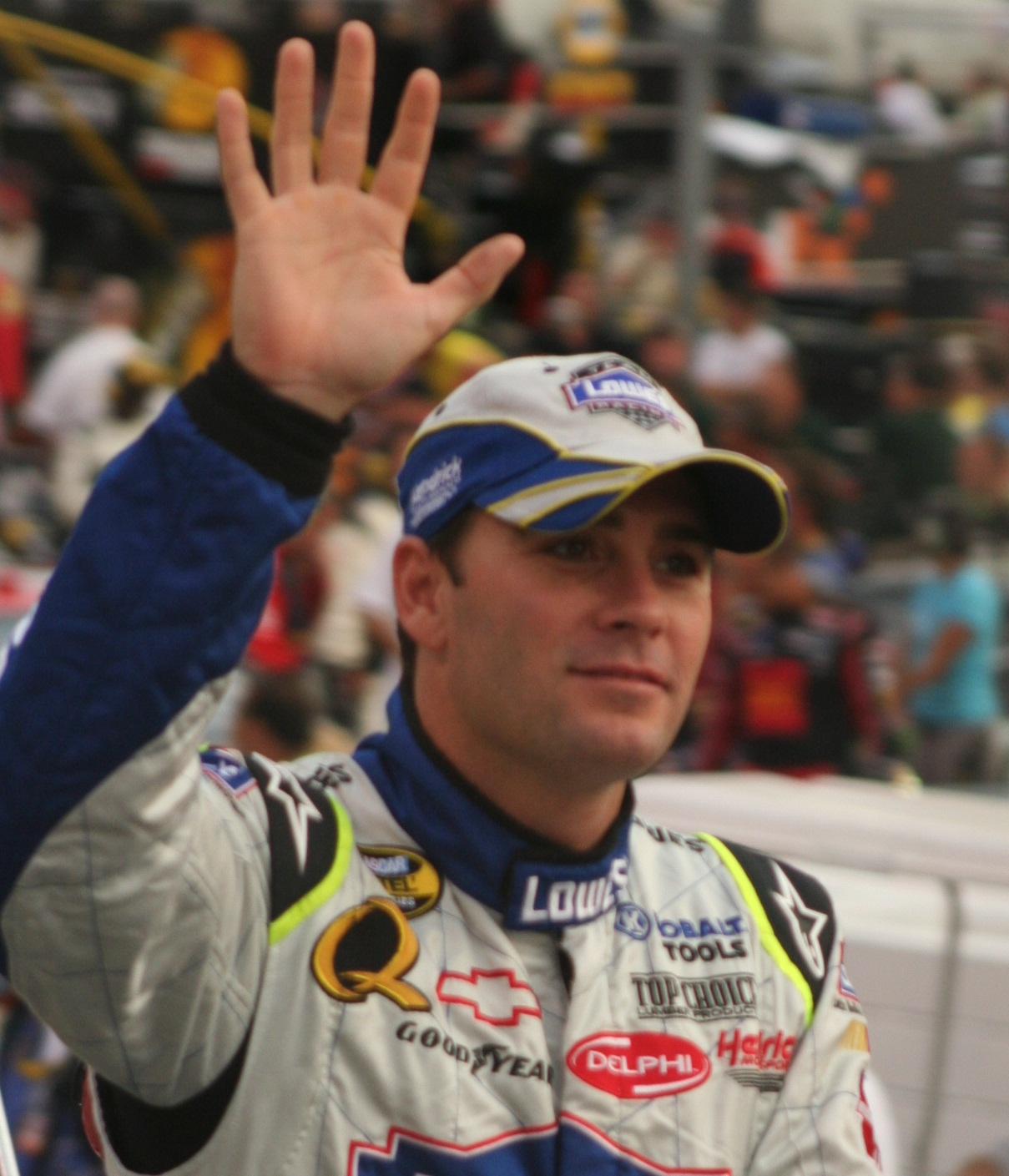
Jimmie Johnson, shown here in 2007, clinched his twenty-fourth career pole position with a time of 15.540.

50 cars were entered for qualifying, due NASCAR's qualifying procedure, only 43 could race. Johnson clinched his twenty-fourth career pole position, with a time of 15.540 seconds. He was joined on the front row of the grid by Edwards. Joey Logano qualified third, Tony Stewart took fourth, and David Reutimann started fifth. Six drivers did not qualify because one team, the car owned by TriStar Motorsports, withdrew from qualifying. They were Dave Blaney, Joe Nemechek, Kevin Lepage, J. J. Yeley, Brian Keselowski, and Mike Bliss. Also during qualifying, Jeff Gordon spun sideways and flattened his tires, but after changing tires, he qualified twenty-sixth.

=== Race summary ===
The race, the twenty-fourth out of a total of thirty-six in the season, began at 7:30 p.m. EDT and was televised live in the United States on ABC. The race was preempted in Southeast Michigan due to that year's Woodward Dream Cruise, broadcast on Scripps-owned WXYZ-TV in Southfield, Michigan. Before the race. conditions were with light rain showers and temperature of 75 °F (24 °C). Ruth Graham daughter of evangelist Billy Graham, began pre-race ceremonies by giving the invocation. Next, children of the drivers and pit crews from Motor Racing Outreach performed the national anthem, and Irwin Tools Ultimate Tradesman Challenge winner Delwyn Thorton gave the command for drivers to start their engines.

Jimmie Johnson held the lead going through the first corner with Carl Edwards behind him. After starting fourth, Tony Stewart passed Edwards for the second position. David Reutimann's fourth position was filled by Ryan Newman on lap 4. By lap seventeen, Johnson and Stewart were ahead of Edwards by 1.8 seconds. On lap 22, Paul Menard moved into the tenth position, after passing Matt Kenseth. Juan Pablo Montoya moved into the sixth position by lap 27. After twenty-nine laps, Robby Gordon and Michael McDowell had driven to the garage as start-and-parks. Two laps later, Menard had moved into the ninth position. On lap 38, Montoya moved into the fifth position, after passing Reutimann.

After starting twentieth, Kurt Busch had moved up to the twelfth position by lap 51. Seven laps later, the first caution came out because David Gilliland collided with the wall. After the drivers had finished their pit stops, Johnson led to the green flag. Stewart moved into the first position one lap later, but he could not maintain it for the second consecutive lap. On lap 65, Kasey Kahne received a drive-through penalty after driving too fast on pit lane. Nine laps later, Kyle Busch moved into the eighth position, as his brother Kurt followed. Afterward, Montoya moved into the sixth position. By lap 81, Johnson had a 0.60 second lead over Stewart. Two laps later, Jamie McMurray passed Kenseth for the tenth position.

On lap 96, Kyle Busch passed Montoya for sixth, as Stewart was gaining ground on Johnson. Two laps later, Edwards caught Stewart for the second position. After 107 laps, Johnson had a 0.65 second lead over Stewart. On lap 127, David Ragan had spun sideways, which prompted the second caution to come out. During the accident, Tony Raines collided in the back of Stewart's race car. Following the caution, Johnson led to the green flag on lap 130. One lap later, the third caution was given because Regan Smith collided with the wall. On lap 140, Johnson led the drivers to the green flag. After starting twenty-first, Greg Biffle had moved into the eleventh position by lap 142. On lap 153, Kevin Harvick said, "We don't know what we're doing. Leave the air alone.", after being frustrated that his crew could not fix the car handling.

On lap 161, there were twenty-eight cars on the lead lap (not a lap down). Eleven laps later, Kyle Busch emerged in the first position, after passing Johnson. By lap 187, Kyle Busch had a 0.96 second lead over Johnson. On lap 192, one of Scott Speed's tires deflated, prompting the fourth caution. Johnson became the leader after pit stops, and led the drivers back to the green flag. On lap 202, Busch reclaimed the lead, as Reutimann passed Johnson for second. Eleven laps later, Stewart collided with the wall, but was able to continue racing. On lap 215, Johnson reclaimed second, after passing Reutimann. Twenty-one laps later, Clint Bowyer passed Kurt Busch for the ninth position. By lap 239, Kyle Busch had a 2.5 second lead over Johnson.

On lap 253, the fifth caution came out because Bobby Labonte collided with the wall. On lap 261, Kyle Busch led the drivers to the green flag. One lap later, Johnson spun sideways and collided with the wall, after making contact with Montoya. Johnson and Denny Hamlin drove to garage during the caution, both with repairs. Kyle Busch, once again, led the drivers to the restart on lap 267. By lap 279, Kyle Busch had a 1.48 second lead over Reutimann. Ten laps later, Hamlin returned to the track, as Kyle Busch had a 1.75 second lead over the second position. On lap 302, Gordon passed A. J. Allmendinger for the tenth position. Eight laps later, Matt Kenseth passed Dale Earnhardt Jr. for the seventh position. On lap 339, McMurray moved into the third position. Four laps later, McMurray passed Reutimann for second. Kyle Busch maintained a 1.57 lead over McMurray, as Kenseth, who was running eighth, drove to pit lane because of tire issues.

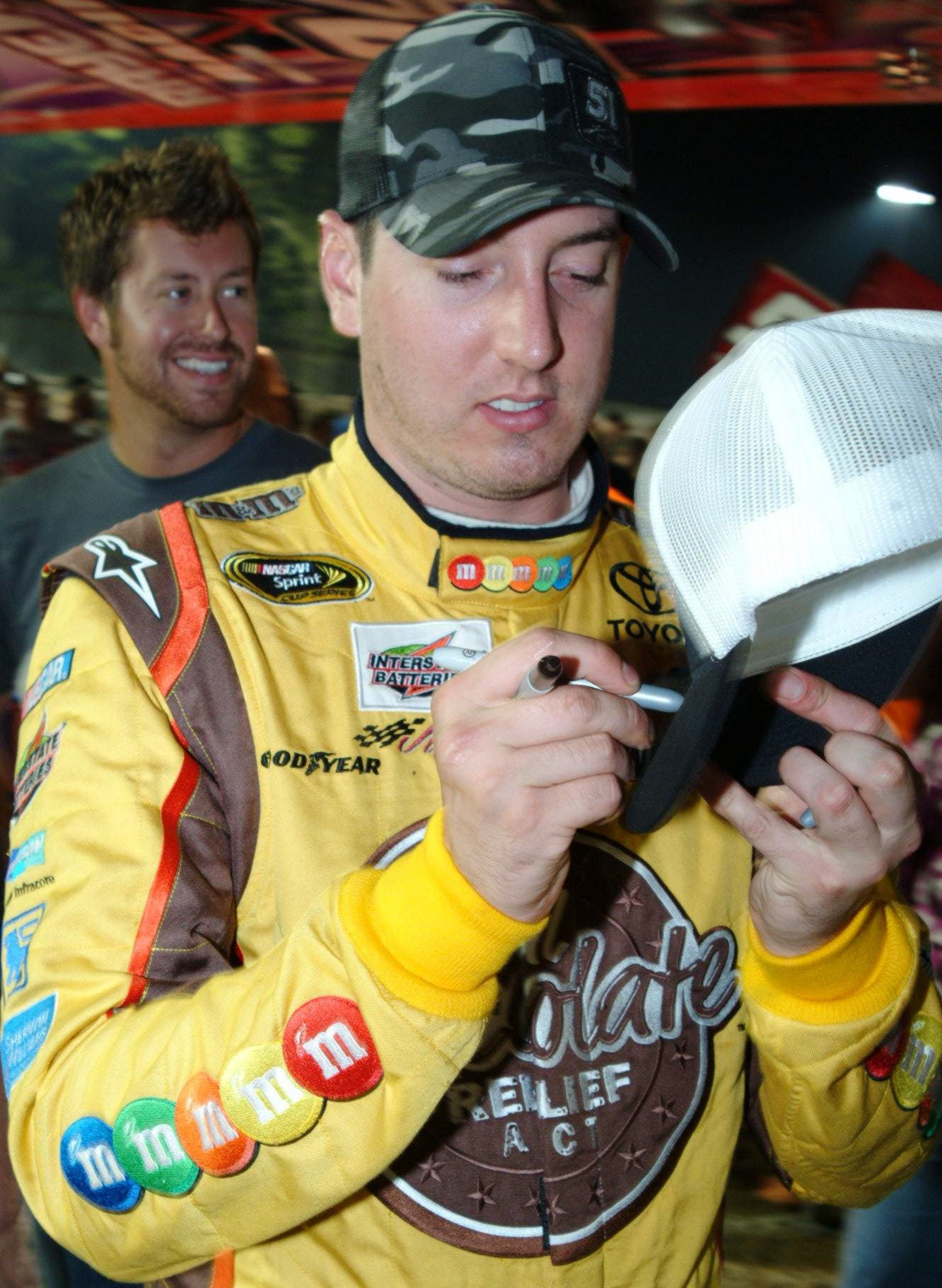
Kyle Busch won the race, leading a race high of 282 laps, and became the first driver to win in all three major NASCAR divisions in a single weekend.

On lap 350, Kahne moved into the sixth position. Eight laps later, McMurray had closed on Kyle Busch. By lap 380, Kyle Busch had claimed the most laps led. Three laps later, Kahne came to pit lane because of a flat tire. On lap 388, McMurray became the leader, after passing Kyle Busch. On lap 399, green flag pit stops began, as McMurray and Kyle Busch came to pit lane for fuel and tires. Afterwards, Jeff Gordon became the leader, but one lap later he was passed by Mark Martin. On lap 404, Reutimann became the leader, as Joey Logano was given a drive-through penalty for speeding on pit lane. Four laps later, the seventh caution came out because of debris on the track. Reutimann led on the restart during lap 414.

Four laps later, Kahne reclaimed the sixth position, as Kyle Busch caught Reutimann. On lap 429, Kyle Busch became the leader, after bumping Reutimann. Kahne moved into the fourth position, after passing Bowyer two laps later. By lap 434, Kyle Busch had a 1.5 second lead over Reutimann. Fifteen laps later, Kurt Busch passed Jeff Gordon for the tenth position. After 467 laps, there were only fourteen cars on the same lap as the leader. By lap 490, Kyle Busch had a 2.49 second lead over the rest of the drivers. Kyle Busch crossed the finish line in first to make history by becoming the first to win in all three major NASCAR divisions in the same weekend: the Camping World Truck Series, the Nationwide Series, and the Sprint Cup Series. David Reutimann followed in second, ahead McMurray in third, Bowyer in fourth, and Kahne in fifth. The race had a total of seven cautions and seventeen lead changes among nine different drivers.

=== Post-race ===
To sweep a weekend, that's awesome, I don't know what to think. I've been trying to do this since I got to NASCAR. Fortunately tonight, I was able to get it done and be the first one to do it. I'm the first of a lot of things.

— Kyle Busch, speaking after the race.

Busch appeared in victory lane after his victory lap to start celebrating making history, and his third win of the season, in front of a crowd of 155,000 people. Busch also earned $331,731 in race winnings. "It's great. We knew we'd run well here and were really looking forward to capitalizing and getting jumped in front of the bubble spot (for the Chase)," said Busch.

Although Reutimann was leading near the end, Busch passed him with seventy-one laps remaining. McMurray, who finished third, said, The balance was too tight at the end. It was a really good night for us. I know most of these fans don't like Kyle Busch, but it's remarkable what he's been able to do this weekend." In the subsequent press conference, Reutimann stated, "My team did a good job, because I was only in the second half of practice, and they had to work with two different drivers, so the credit all goes to my team." "At one point, I thought we were going to have the car to beat, but at the end, we just didn't have the speed we needed," McMurray added. Johnson, who was involved in an accident on lap 263, said, "I thought I left [Montoya] enough room on the outside lane there. We're on the straightaway for a little bit, and then all of the sudden, I got hooked with force. It's not like we bumped and banged, and I squeezed him. I thought we were on the straightaway and everything was fine, and then around I went." Following the race, Busch would add, "This [car] was awesome today. What a great race car. It's the second time I've run it this year."

The race result left Harvick leading the Driver's Championship with 3,521 points. Jeff Gordon, who finished eleventh, was second with 3,242 points, which assured him a position in the Chase for the Sprint Cup. He was seventy-two points ahead of race winner Kyle Busch and 129 ahead of Edwards. Hamlin was fifth with 3,108 points. Chevrolet maintained their lead in the Manufacturers' Championship with 173 points. Toyota placed second with 146 points, and Ford followed with 110 points, eleven ahead of Dodge in fourth. 5.842 million people watched the race on television. The race took two hours, forty-one minutes and twenty-four seconds to complete, and the margin of victory was 0.677 seconds.

== Results ==
=== Qualifying ===
Grid	Car	Driver	Team	Manufacturer	Time	Speed
1	48	Jimmie Johnson	Hendrick Motorsports	Chevrolet	15.540	123.475
2	99	Carl Edwards	Roush Fenway Racing	Ford	15.608	122.937
3	20	Joey Logano	Joe Gibbs Racing	Toyota	15.630	122.764
4	14	Tony Stewart	Stewart–Haas Racing	Chevrolet	15.653	122.584
5	00	David Reutimann	Michael Waltrip Racing	Toyota	15.664	122.497
6	39	Ryan Newman	Stewart–Haas Racing	Chevrolet	15.680	122.372
7	1	Jamie McMurray	Earnhardt Ganassi Racing	Chevrolet	15.691	122.287
8	42	Juan Pablo Montoya	Earnhardt Ganassi Racing	Chevrolet	15.696	122.248
9	56	Martin Truex Jr.	Michael Waltrip Racing	Toyota	15.705	122.178
10	43	A. J. Allmendinger	Richard Petty Motorsports	Ford	15.708	122.154
11	9	Kasey Kahne	Richard Petty Motorsports	Ford	15.711	122.131
12	98	Paul Menard	Richard Petty Motorsports	Ford	15.711	122.131
13	5	Mark Martin	Hendrick Motorsports	Chevrolet	15.725	122.022
14	17	Matt Kenseth	Roush Fenway Racing	Ford	15.728	121.999
15	12	Brad Keselowski	Penske Racing	Dodge	15.728	121.999
16	31	Jeff Burton	Richard Childress Racing	Chevrolet	15.732	121.968
17	11	Denny Hamlin	Joe Gibbs Racing	Toyota	15.734	121.952
18	83	Reed Sorenson	Red Bull Racing Team	Toyota	15.742	121.890
19	18	Kyle Busch	Joe Gibbs Racing	Toyota	15.745	121.867
20	2	Kurt Busch	Penske Racing	Dodge	15.752	121.813
21	16	Greg Biffle	Roush Fenway Racing	Ford	15.755	121.790
22	47	Marcos Ambrose	JTG Daugherty Racing	Toyota	15.773	121.651
23	82	Scott Speed	Red Bull Racing Team	Toyota	15.791	121.512
24	33	Clint Bowyer	Richard Childress Racing	Chevrolet	15.796	121.474
25	77	Sam Hornish Jr.	Penske Racing	Dodge	15.797	121.466
26	24	Jeff Gordon	Hendrick Motorsports	Chevrolet	15.803	121.420
27	88	Dale Earnhardt Jr.	Hendrick Motorsports	Chevrolet	15.808	121.382
28	29	Kevin Harvick	Richard Childress Racing	Chevrolet	15.820	121.290
29	78	Regan Smith	Furniture Row Racing	Chevrolet	15.822	121.274
30	09	Bobby Labonte	Phoenix Racing	Chevrolet	15.843	121.113
31	26	Jeff Green	Latitude 43 Motorsports	Ford	15.858	120.999
32	66	Scott Riggs	Prism Motorsports	Toyota	15.864	120.953
33	34	Travis Kvapil	Front Row Motorsports	Ford	15.869	120.915
34	38	David Gilliland	Front Row Motorsports	Ford	15.869	120.915
35	55	Michael McDowell	Prism Motorsports	Toyota	15.869	120.915
36	64	Todd Bodine	Gunselman Motorsports	Toyota	15.882	120.816
37	07	Robby Gordon	Robby Gordon Motorsports	Toyota	15.889	120.763
38	6	David Ragan	Roush Fenway Racing	Ford	15.896	120.710
39	37	Tony Raines	Front Row Motorsports	Ford	16.033	119.678
40	7	Kevin Conway	Robby Gordon Motorsports	Toyota	16.045	119.589
41	19	Elliott Sadler	Richard Petty Motorsports	Ford	16.071	119.395
42	71	Landon Cassill	TRG Motorsports	Chevrolet	16.072	119.388
43	13	Casey Mears	Germain Racing	Toyota	15.902	120.664
Failed to qualify
44	36	Dave Blaney	Tommy Baldwin Racing	Chevrolet	15.952	120.286
45	87	Joe Nemechek	NEMCO Motorsports	Toyota	15.958	120.241
46	4	Kevin Lepage	Morgan-McClure Motorsports	Chevrolet	16.088	119.269
47	46	J. J. Yeley	Whitney Motorsports	Dodge	16.143	118.863
48	92	Brian Keselowski	K-Automotive Motorsports	Dodge	16.267	117.957
49	32	Mike Bliss	Braun Racing	Toyota	16.981	112.997

=== Race results ===
Pos	Grid	Car	Driver	Team	Manufacturer	Laps run	Points
1	19	18	Kyle Busch	Joe Gibbs Racing	Toyota	500	195^{2}
2	2	00	David Reutimann	Michael Waltrip Racing	Toyota	500	175^{1}
3	7	1	Jamie McMurray	Earnhardt Ganassi Racing	Chevrolet	500	170^{1}
4	24	33	Clint Bowyer	Richard Childress Racing	Chevrolet	500	165^{1}
5	11	9	Kasey Kahne	Richard Petty Motorsports	Ford	500	155
6	6	39	Ryan Newman	Stewart–Haas Racing	Chevrolet	500	150
7	8	42	Juan Pablo Montoya	Earnhardt Ganassi Racing	Chevrolet	500	146
8	21	16	Greg Biffle	Roush Fenway Racing	Ford	500	142
9	20	2	Kurt Busch	Penske Racing	Dodge	500	138
10	14	17	Matt Kenseth	Roush Fenway Racing	Ford	500	134
11	26	24	Jeff Gordon	Hendrick Motorsports	Chevrolet	500	135^{1}
12	2	99	Carl Edwards	Roush Fenway Racing	Ford	500	127
13	27	88	Dale Earnhardt Jr.	Hendrick Motorsports	Chevrolet	500	124
14	28	29	Kevin Harvick	Richard Childress Racing	Chevrolet	499	121
15	18	83	Reed Sorenson	Red Bull Racing Team	Toyota	499	118
16	16	31	Jeff Burton	Richard Childress Racing	Chevrolet	499	115
17	9	56	Martin Truex Jr.	Michael Waltrip Racing	Toyota	499	112
18	3	20	Joey Logano	Joe Gibbs Racing	Toyota	499	109
19	15	12	Brad Keselowski	Penske Racing	Dodge	499	106
20	22	47	Marcos Ambrose	JTG Daugherty Racing	Toyota	499	103
21	12	98	Paul Menard	Richard Petty Motorsports	Ford	499	100
22	33	34	Travis Kvapil	Front Row Motorsports	Ford	498	102^{1}
23	13	5	Mark Martin	Hendrick Motorsports	Chevrolet	498	99^{1}
24	31	26	Jeff Green	Latitude 43 Motorsports	Ford	497	91
25	25	77	Sam Hornish Jr.	Penske Racing	Dodge	497	88
26	34	38	David Gilliland	Front Row Motorsports	Ford	495	85
27	4	14	Tony Stewart	Stewart–Haas Racing	Chevrolet	494	87^{1}
28	39	37	Tony Raines	Front Row Motorsports	Ford	492	79
29	41	19	Elliott Sadler	Richard Petty Motorsports	Ford	491	76
30	29	78	Regan Smith	Furniture Row Racing	Chevrolet	489	73
31	10	43	A. J. Allmendinger	Richard Petty Motorsports	Ford	488	70
32	38	6	David Ragan	Roush Fenway Racing	Ford	486	67
33	23	82	Scott Speed	Red Bull Racing Team	Toyota	486	64
34	17	11	Denny Hamlin	Joe Gibbs Racing	Toyota	473	61
35	1	48	Jimmie Johnson	Hendrick Motorsports	Chevrolet	415	63^{1}
36	40	7	Kevin Conway	Robby Gordon Motorsports	Toyota	212	55
37	42	71	Landon Cassill	TRG Motorsports	Chevrolet	129	52
38	30	09	Bobby Labonte	Phoenix Racing	Chevrolet	118	49
39	43	13	Casey Mears	Germain Racing	Toyota	58	46
40	37	07	Robby Gordon	Robby Gordon Motorsports	Toyota	50	43
41	36	64	Todd Bodine	Gunselman Motorsports	Toyota	47	40
42	32	66	Scott Riggs	Prism Motorsports	Toyota	32	37
43	35	55	Michael McDowell	Prism Motorsports	Toyota	16	34
^{1} Includes five bonus points for leading a lap
^{2} Includes ten bonus points for leading the most laps

== Standings after the race ==
Drivers' Championship standings
Rank	Driver	Points
1	Kevin Harvick	3,521
2	Jeff Gordon	3,242
3	Kyle Busch	3,170
4	Carl Edwards	3,113
5	Denny Hamlin	3,108

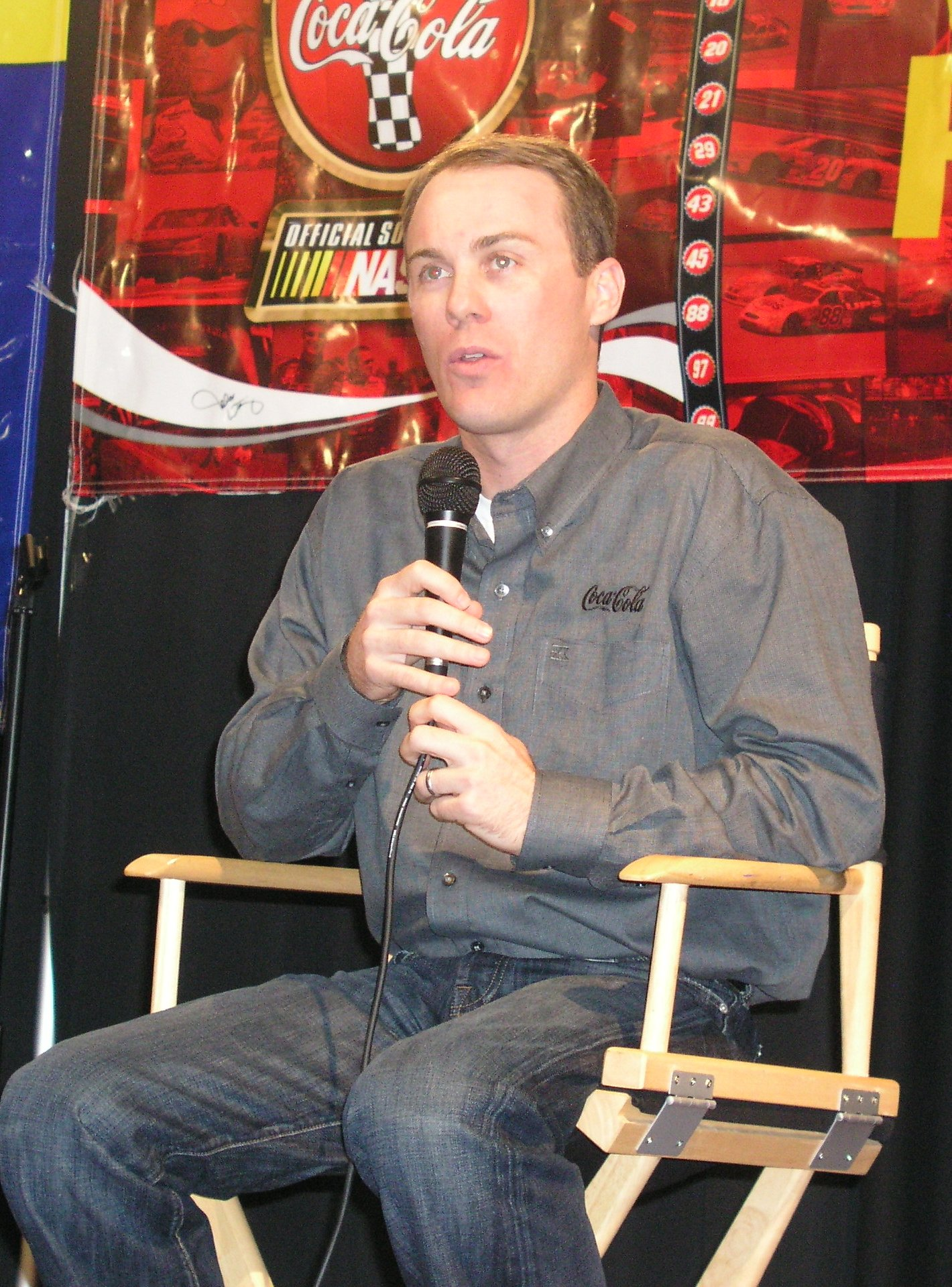
Kevin Harvick remained the Drivers' Championship leader after finishing fourteenth in the race

Manufacturers' Championship standings
Rank	Manufacturer	Points
1	Chevrolet	173
2	Toyota	146
3	Ford	110
4	Dodge	99

- Note: Only the top five positions are included for both sets of standings.

Previous race: 2010 Carfax 400	Sprint Cup Series; 2010 season	Next race: 2010 Emory Healthcare 500
