= 2010 Carfax 400 =

Race details
- Race 23 of 36 in the 2010 NASCAR Sprint Cup Series
- Date: August 15, 2010
- Location: Michigan International Speedway, Brooklyn, Michigan
- Course: Permanent racing facility
- Course length: 2.0 miles (3.2 km)
- Distance: 200 laps, 400 mi (643.7 km)
- Weather: Partly cloudy with a high around 81; wind out of the W at 10 mph. Chance of precipitation: 10.
- Average speed: 144.029 miles per hour (231.792 km/h)

Pole position
Driver	Kasey Kahne	Richard Petty Motorsports
- Time: 38.465

Most laps led
Driver	Greg Biffle	Roush Fenway Racing
- Laps: 66

Winner
No. 29	Kevin Harvick	Richard Childress Racing

Television in the United States
- Network: ESPN
- Announcers: Marty Reid, Dale Jarrett and Andy Petree

The 2010 Carfax 400 was a NASCAR Sprint Cup Series stock car race that was held on August 15, 2010, at Michigan International Speedway in Cambridge Township, Michigan. Contested over 200 laps, it was the twenty-third race of the 2010 Sprint Cup Series season. The race was won by Kevin Harvick for the Richard Childress Racing team. Denny Hamlin finished second, and Carl Edwards, who started twenty-fourth, clinched third.

Pole position driver Kasey Kahne maintained his lead into the first corner to begin the race, but Jimmie Johnson, who started in the second position on the grid, took the lead before the first lap was over. Afterward, Greg Biffle became the leader, and would eventually lead to the race high of 66 laps. Tony Stewart led after the final pit stops, ahead of Hamlin and Harvick. Harvick helped Hamlin to become the leader, but with twelve laps left, Harvick gained on Hamlin and claimed the first position with eleven laps remaining. Harvick maintained his position to claim his first Sprint Cup victory at Michigan International Speedway.

There were five cautions and nineteen lead changes among nine different drivers throughout the course of the race, Harvick's third win of the season. The result maintained the first position in the Drivers' Championship and clinched him a position in the Chase. He remained 293 points ahead of second place driver Jeff Gordon and 353 ahead of Denny Hamlin. Chevrolet maintained its lead in the Manufacturers' Championship, thirty points ahead of Toyota and sixty-one ahead of Ford, with thirteen races remaining in the season. A total of 105,000 people attended the race, while 4.917 million watched it on television.

== Race report ==
=== Background ===
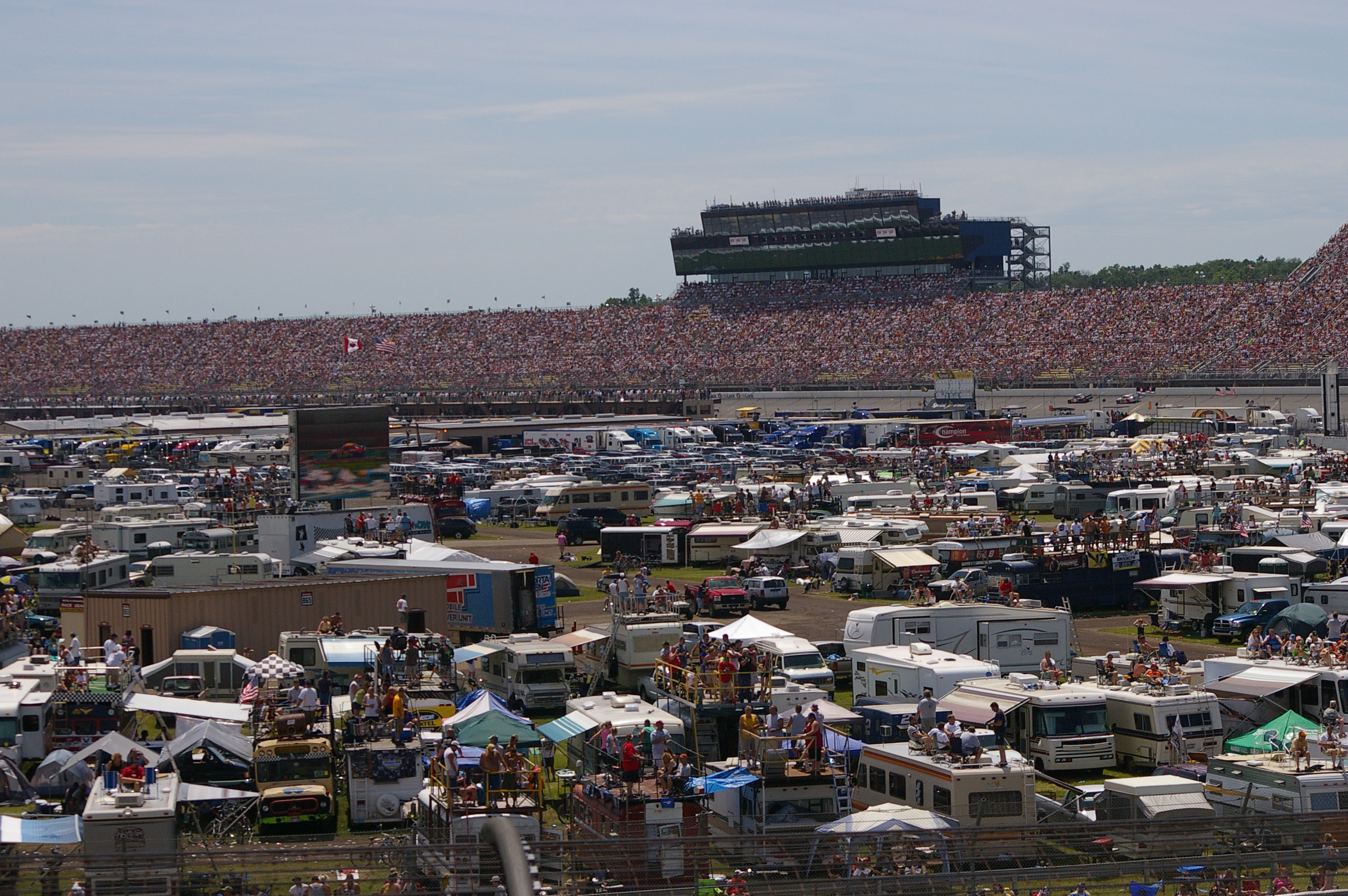
Michigan International Speedway, the race track where the race was held.

Michigan International Speedway is one of six superspeedways to hold NASCAR races; the others are Daytona International Speedway, Auto Club Speedway, Indianapolis Motor Speedway, Pocono Raceway and Talladega Superspeedway. The standard track at Michigan International Speedway is a four-turn superspeedway that is 2 miles (3.2 km) long. The track's turns are banked at eighteen degrees, while the front stretch, the location of the finish line, is banked at twelve degrees. The back stretch, has a five degree banking. Michigan International Speedway had a seating capacity of 119,500 people for the race.

One team chose to replace their regular driver with a substitute. Prior to the first practice session, ExtenZe decided to cancel their sponsorship with Front Row Motorsports, prompting the team to replace Kevin Conway with Tony Raines. Raines was originally entered in Gunselman Motorsports' No. 64, which withdrew when Raines moved to the No. 34. During the week leading up to the race, Gordon's wife gave birth to their son, Leo Benjamin Gordon. Gordon said that he was not planning to retire until his son could see him in victory lane.

Before the race, Kevin Harvick led the Drivers' Championship with 3,210 points, and Jeff Gordon stood in second with 3,025 points. Jeff Burton was third in the Drivers' Championship with 2,895 points, Kurt Busch was fourth with 2,892 points, and Jimmie Johnson was in fifth with 2,882 points. In the Manufacturers' Championship, Chevrolet was leading with 158 points, twenty-seven points ahead of their rival Toyota. Ford, with 102 points, was nine points ahead of Dodge in the battle for third. Brian Vickers was the race's defending champion.

=== Practice and qualifying ===
Three practice sessions were held before the Sunday race—one on Friday and two on Saturday. The first session lasted 90 minutes. The Saturday morning session lasted 45 minutes, and the final practice session was 60 minutes in length. During the first practice session, Jeff Burton was quickest with a time of 38.479, ahead of Juan Pablo Montoya and Kevin Harvick in second and third. Carl Edwards followed in the fourth position, ahead of Greg Biffle in fifth. In the Saturday morning session, Biffle was quickest, ahead of Ryan Newman and Kasey Kahne in second and third. Burton and Kurt Busch followed in the fourth and fifth positions. In the final practice session for the race, Jimmie Johnson was quickest with a time of 38.742. David Ragan followed in second, ahead of Jeff Gordon and Harvick in third and fourth. Biffle, who was quickest in second practice, only managed fifth quickest.

Denny Hamlin, who won at Michigan International Speedway in the spring, was having a difficult time trying to improve the car handling of the race car he won with. Hamlin said, "It's going all right. We were about like we were here in [June] as far as speed. We're a little bit slow on speed as far as qualifying, but we feel like the race stuff is pretty competitive." His teammate Kyle Busch was also struggling, adding, "Our [car] was loose off. We jumped back and forth in practice from tight to loose. We picked up from practice, but we couldn't rotate the center like I wanted to."

During qualifying, forty-seven cars were entered, but only forty-three will be able to race because of NASCAR's qualifying procedure. Kasey Kahne clinched his eighteenth career pole position, with a time of 38.465. After his qualifying run, Kahne commented, "[Turns] 1 and 2 were really strong. Coming to the green, I felt like I was a little bit free, and it was the same through 1 and 2, but I got through there really good and carried a lot of speed down the backstretch. Then, when I got to Turn 3, I couldn't get it to turn enough, so I kind of just floored it and actually used up a lot of the racetrack, went up the track a little bit loose off [the corner] and definitely didn't have as good a 3 and 4 as I would have liked. At that point, I thought I probably gave the pole away, but we were able to still hang on just from the speed that we had in 1 and 2." He was joined on the front row of the grid by Jimmie Johnson. Clint Bowyer qualified third, Tony Stewart took fourth, and Montoya started fifth, after being scored ninth in the final practice session. The four drivers that did not qualify were J. J. Yeley, Scott Riggs, Casey Mears, and Mike Bliss.

=== Race summary ===
The race, the twenty-third out of a total of thirty-six in the season, began at 1 p.m. EDT and was televised live in the United States on ESPN. Conditions were partly cloudy with a high of 80 °F (27 °C). Pastor Doug Bradshaw began pre-race ceremonies by giving the invocation. Next, Virgin Records recording artists Saving Abel performed the national anthem, and Virginia Craig and Evander Holyfield gave the command for drivers to start their engines.

Kasey Kahne held the lead going through the first corner but was passed by Jimmie Johnson before the second lap. Tony Stewart then passed Kahne for the second position. Five laps later, Greg Biffle emerged in third. By lap ten, Johnson had built a 1.7-second lead over Stewart, who was passed by Biffle for second. Biffle caught Johnson by lap 14, but he did not snatch the lead until lap 15. On lap 18, Stewart took second place from Johnson, as Kevin Harvick emerged in fourth. Harvick moved into third after passing Johnson on the next lap. On lap 23, Michael McDowell and P. J. Jones drove to the garage, followed by Joe Nemechek two laps later. On lap 28, Harvick began closing in on Biffle, but before he could pass him, the first caution was called because Kurt Busch's engine had failed. On lap 39, Biffle led the drivers in the restart. Juan Pablo Montoya moved to fifth after passing Clint Bowyer on the next lap. Johnson reclaimed third position on lap 41 but was passed by Harvick after five laps. By lap 48, Harvick had caught and passed Stewart for the second position, and by lap 55, Harvick had caught Biffle. Five laps later, light rain falling in turn three (the turn following the back stretch) prompted the second caution. On lap 61, teams made their pit stops for fuel and tires. Biffle remained the leader when the green flag waved on lap 66.

On lap 70, Joey Logano collided with Paul Menard, and both sustained minor damage. After starting thirty-sixth, Jeff Gordon moved into the tenth position by lap 73. Eleven laps later, Stewart took the lead from Biffle. On lap 92, Harvick passed Biffle to claim the second position. Gordon passed Johnson for seventh as Montoya and David Reutimann began a run of green flag pit stops on lap 98. They were followed by Johnson, Kyle Busch, and Denny Hamlin two laps later. When Stewart went to pit the next lap, Harvick became the leader. Stewart reclaimed the lead on lap 103. Seven laps later, Bowyer passed Kahne for the fourth position, and Harvick moved into the first position.

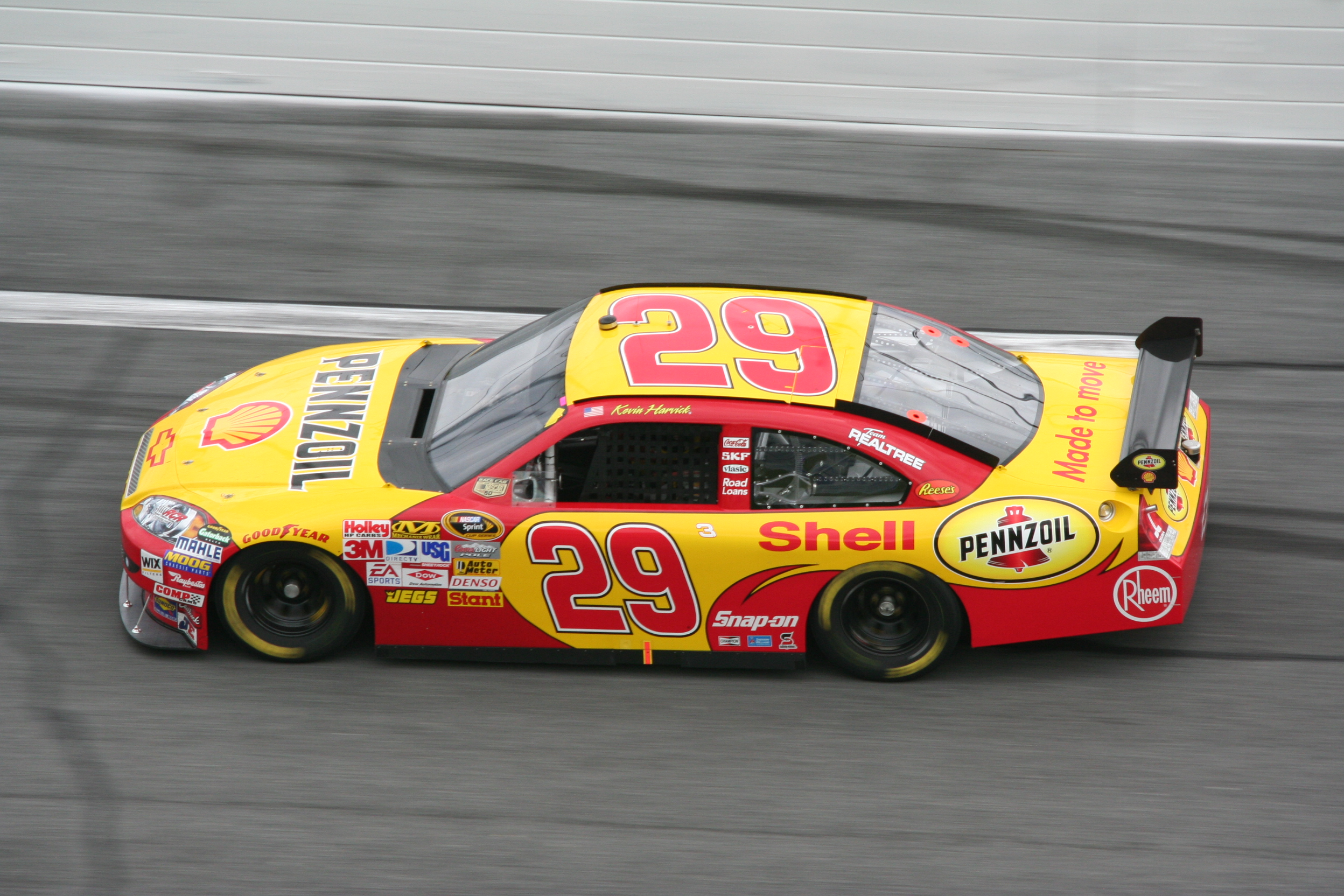
Kevin Harvick won the race, leading a total of sixty laps.

On lap 116, Gordon emerged in fourth while Harvick held a 1.5-second lead over Stewart. Ten laps later, Gordon moved into the third position. By lap 129, Harvick had a 6.45-second lead over Biffle, who had passed Stewart for second. On lap 137, green flag pit stops began for the second time. Two laps later, Biffle made his pit stop. Harvick stayed on the track for another lap before pitting fast enough to hold off Biffle, therefore remaining the leader at the conclusion of the pit stops. On lap 148, Logano and Ryan Newman collided, causing Newman's car to turn sideways, causing the third caution flag to be waved. On lap 152, Harvick led the drivers to the green flag. Two laps later, the fourth caution came out because Jeff Gordon and Jeff Burton sustained damage to their race cars. Most drivers made a pit stop for fuel only, but Elliott Sadler stayed on track to lead the race. Sadler led on the restart, but Martin Truex Jr. and David Ragan passed him on the following lap, relegating him to third position.

On lap 166, Ragan passed Truex Jr. for the lead. The next lap, Stewart emerged in the first position as the fifth caution came out because of debris on the track. On lap 169, Stewart, Harvick, Regan Smith, Scott Speed, and Hamlin stayed out on the track while the rest of the field made pit stops. Stewart led on the restart, followed by Harvick. On lap 174, Hamlin passed Harvick for the second position and Biffle moved into fourth. Harvick helped Hamlin into the lead four laps later, but passed him for the lead on lap 189. By lap 193, Harvick had a 1.35-second lead over Hamlin. Carl Edwards passed Stewart for third on the next lap. Kevin Harvick crossed the finish line in first to take his third win of the season. Denny Hamlin followed in second, ahead of Edwards in third, Biffle in fourth, and Matt Kenseth in fifth. The race had five cautions and ten lead changes among five different drivers.

=== Post-race ===
The season has gone so well from last year, but to come to Michigan and be able to run the way we did today, after the way we've run here the past three years, this shows how far the organization has come as a whole,”

— Gil Martin, speaking after the race.

Kevin Harvick appeared in victory lane after his victory lap to start celebrating his third win of the season, and his first Sprint Cup win at Michigan International Speedway, in front of a crowd of 105,000 people. "Our cars had run good here before, but I hadn't. The last couple of times we've really committed ourselves to driving in different spots on the race track and doing different things from inside the car and trying to manage the practice as well as we can to not fool ourselves," said Harvick of his triumph.

Although Denny Hamlin was leading the race near the end, Harvick passed him with eleven laps left. Hamlin, who finished second, said, "He would catch me getting into turn three, I would pull away in three and four. He was quite a bit better than me in one and two. So it was kind of split. It's pretty much all we had. Obviously the fastest car won today. So it was at least good to see that." In the subsequent press conference, Harvick stated, "A lot of the places we would classify as places we don't run good, we've ran as good at those places this year as we do at the short tracks, road courses, the places you can typically count on us running good." Richard Childress, the owner of Richard Childress Racing, expressed his enjoyment of winning the race after reminiscing about one of his other victories at the track:

"I remember winning here and how proud we were to win for GM Goodwrench back in those days and to win in a GM product up here. There’s a lot of pride. It’s great to be here today and win."

Harvick spoke about the difficulty of winning at the track, saying "It's just a lot of years of getting beat by people running up there to be honest with you. I never really could figure it out. So probably end of last year ... I went home and watched some tapes of Dale [Earnhardt] Jr., some of his previous races here, because he always seemed to have a good handle on running the top groove. It was just more of a rhythm thing and some things that I needed to change in my approach to run up there. For us, I think the biggest change was not only the race cars being good, but just the approach to where we ran on the race track during the race and making that commitment. It worked out for us today." The race result left Harvick leading the Driver's Championship with 3,400 points, assuring him a position in the Chase for the Sprint Cup. Jeff Gordon, who finished twenty-seventh, was second on 3,107, sixty points ahead of Hamlin and eighty-seven ahead of Tony Stewart. Jimmie Johnson was fifth with 3,014 points. Chevrolet maintained their lead in the Manufacturers' Championship with 167 points. Toyota placed second with 147 points, and Ford followed with 106 points, ten ahead of Dodge in fourth. 4.917 million people watched the race on television. The race took two hours, forty-six minutes and thirty-eight seconds to complete, and the margin of victory was 1.731 seconds.

== Results ==
=== Qualifying ===
Grid	Car	Driver	Team	Manufacturer	Time	Speed
1	9	Kasey Kahne	Richard Petty Motorsports	Ford	187.183	38.465
2	48	Jimmie Johnson	Hendrick Motorsports	Chevrolet	187.086	38.485
3	33	Clint Bowyer	Richard Childress Racing	Chevrolet	186.577	38.590
4	14	Tony Stewart	Stewart–Haas Racing	Chevrolet	186.572	38.591
5	42	Juan Pablo Montoya	Earnhardt Ganassi Racing	Chevrolet	186.461	38.614
6	16	Greg Biffle	Roush Fenway Racing	Ford	186.350	38.637
7	17	Matt Kenseth	Roush Fenway Racing	Ford	186.268	38.654
8	29	Kevin Harvick	Richard Childress Racing	Chevrolet	186.176	38.673
9	56	Martin Truex Jr.	Michael Waltrip Racing	Toyota	186.167	38.675
10	98	Paul Menard	Richard Petty Motorsports	Ford	185.912	38.728
11	31	Jeff Burton	Richard Childress Racing	Chevrolet	185.730	38.766
12	5	Mark Martin	Hendrick Motorsports	Chevrolet	185.715	38.769
13	2	Kurt Busch	Penske Racing	Dodge	185.596	38.794
14	00	David Reutimann	Michael Waltrip Racing	Toyota	185.596	38.794
15	09	Landon Cassill	Phoenix Racing	Chevrolet	185.467	38.821
16	43	A. J. Allmendinger	Richard Petty Motorsports	Ford	185.419	38.831
17	39	Ryan Newman	Stewart–Haas Racing	Chevrolet	185.333	38.849
18	18	Kyle Busch	Joe Gibbs Racing	Toyota	185.290	38.858
19	1	Jamie McMurray	Earnhardt Ganassi Racing	Chevrolet	185.276	38.861
20	78	Regan Smith	Furniture Row Racing	Chevrolet	185.071	38.904
21	13	Max Papis	Germain Racing	Toyota	184.952	38.929
22	87	Joe Nemechek	NEMCO Motorsports	Toyota	184.876	38.945
23	19	Elliott Sadler	Richard Petty Motorsports	Ford	184.867	38.947
24	99	Carl Edwards	Roush Fenway Racing	Ford	184.776	38.966
25	26	Patrick Carpentier	Latitude 43 Motorsports	Ford	184.729	38.976
26	12	Brad Keselowski	Penske Racing	Dodge	184.634	38.996
27	20	Joey Logano	Joe Gibbs Racing	Toyota	184.615	39.000
28	77	Sam Hornish Jr.	Penske Racing	Dodge	184.582	39.007
29	6	David Ragan	Roush Fenway Racing	Ford	184.535	39.017
30	21	Bill Elliott	Wood Brothers Racing	Ford	184.431	39.039
31	82	Scott Speed	Red Bull Racing Team	Toyota	184.417	39.042
32	38	Travis Kvapil	Front Row Motorsports	Ford	184.341	39.058
33	11	Denny Hamlin	Joe Gibbs Racing	Toyota	183.885	39.155
34	83	Reed Sorenson	Red Bull Racing Team	Toyota	183.870	39.158
35	07	Robby Gordon	Robby Gordon Motorsports	Toyota	183.744	39.185
36	24	Jeff Gordon	Hendrick Motorsports	Chevrolet	183.439	39.250
37	47	Marcos Ambrose	JTG Daugherty Racing	Toyota	183.388	39.261
38	88	Dale Earnhardt Jr.	Hendrick Motorsports	Chevrolet	183.337	39.272
39	34	Tony Raines	Front Row Motorsports	Ford	182.764	39.395
40	71	Bobby Labonte	TRG Motorsports	Chevrolet	182.454	39.462
41	7	P. J. Jones	Robby Gordon Motorsports	Toyota	180.555	39.877
42	37	David Gilliland	Front Row Motorsports	Ford	179.708	40.045
43	55	Michael McDowell	Prism Motorsports	Toyota	183.257	39.289
Failed to qualify
44	32	Mike Bliss	Braun Racing	Toyota	183.136	39.315
45	46	J. J. Yeley	Whitney Motorsports	Dodge	183.038	39.336
46	66	Scott Riggs	Prism Motorsports	Toyota	180.959	39.788
47	36	Casey Mears	Tommy Baldwin Racing	Chevrolet	180.059	39.987

=== Race results ===
Pos	Grid	Car	Driver	Team	Manufacturer	Laps run	Points
1	8	29	Kevin Harvick	Richard Childress Racing	Chevrolet	200	190^{1}
2	33	11	Denny Hamlin	Joe Gibbs Racing	Toyota	200	175^{1}
3	24	99	Carl Edwards	Roush Fenway Racing	Ford	200	165
4	6	16	Greg Biffle	Roush Fenway Racing	Ford	200	170^{2}
5	7	17	Matt Kenseth	Roush Fenway Racing	Ford	200	155
6	4	14	Tony Stewart	Stewart–Haas Racing	Chevrolet	200	155^{1}
7	5	42	Juan Pablo Montoya	Earnhardt Ganassi Racing	Chevrolet	200	146
8	9	56	Martin Truex Jr.	Michael Waltrip Racing	Toyota	200	147^{1}
9	23	19	Elliott Sadler	Richard Petty Motorsports	Ford	200	143^{1}
10	27	20	Joey Logano	Joe Gibbs Racing	Toyota	200	134
11	29	6	David Ragan	Roush Fenway Racing	Ford	200	135^{1}
12	2	48	Jimmie Johnson	Hendrick Motorsports	Chevrolet	200	132^{1}
13	3	33	Clint Bowyer	Richard Childress Racing	Chevrolet	200	124
14	1	9	Kasey Kahne	Richard Petty Motorsports	Ford	200	121
15	37	47	Marcos Ambrose	JTG Daugherty Racing	Toyota	200	118
16	14	00	David Reutimann	Michael Waltrip Racing	Toyota	200	115
17	16	43	A. J. Allmendinger	Richard Petty Motorsports	Ford	200	112
18	18	18	Kyle Busch	Joe Gibbs Racing	Toyota	200	109
19	38	88	Dale Earnhardt Jr.	Hendrick Motorsports	Chevrolet	200	106
20	19	1	Jamie McMurray	Earnhardt Ganassi Racing	Chevrolet	200	103
21	20	78	Regan Smith	Furniture Row Racing	Chevrolet	200	100
22	30	21	Bill Elliott	Wood Brothers Racing	Ford	200	97
23	17	39	Ryan Newman	Stewart–Haas Racing	Chevrolet	200	94
24	11	31	Jeff Burton	Richard Childress Racing	Chevrolet	200	91
25	31	82	Scott Speed	Red Bull Racing Team	Toyota	200	88
26	34	83	Reed Sorenson	Red Bull Racing Team	Toyota	200	85
27	36	24	Jeff Gordon	Hendrick Motorsports	Chevrolet	200	82
28	12	5	Mark Martin	Hendrick Motorsports	Chevrolet	199	79
29	25	26	Patrick Carpentier	Latitude 43 Motorsports	Ford	199	76
30	32	38	Travis Kvapil	Front Row Motorsports	Ford	199	78^{1}
31	39	34	Tony Raines	Front Row Motorsports	Ford	199	70
32	28	77	Sam Hornish Jr.	Penske Racing	Dodge	199	67
33	40	71	Bobby Labonte	TRG Motorsports	Chevrolet	198	64
34	26	12	Brad Keselowski	Penske Racing	Dodge	197	61
35	10	98	Paul Menard	Richard Petty Motorsports	Ford	197	58
36	42	37	David Gilliland	Front Row Motorsports	Ford	195	55
37	41	7	P. J. Jones	Robby Gordon Motorsports	Toyota	64	52
38	15	09	Landon Cassill	Phoenix Racing	Chevrolet	54	49
39	35	07	Robby Gordon	Robby Gordon Motorsports	Toyota	34	0
40	13	2	Kurt Busch	Penske Racing	Dodge	30	43
41	21	13	Max Papis	Germain Racing	Toyota	27	40
42	43	55	Michael McDowell	Prism Motorsports	Toyota	20	37
43	22	87	Joe Nemechek	NEMCO Motorsports	Toyota	14	34
^{1} Includes five bonus points for leading a lap
^{2} Includes ten bonus points for leading the most laps

== Standings after the race ==
Drivers' Championship standings

Pos	Driver	Points
1	Kevin Harvick*	3,400
2	Jeff Gordon	3,107
3	Denny Hamlin	3,047
4	Tony Stewart	3,020
5	Jimmie Johnson	3,014

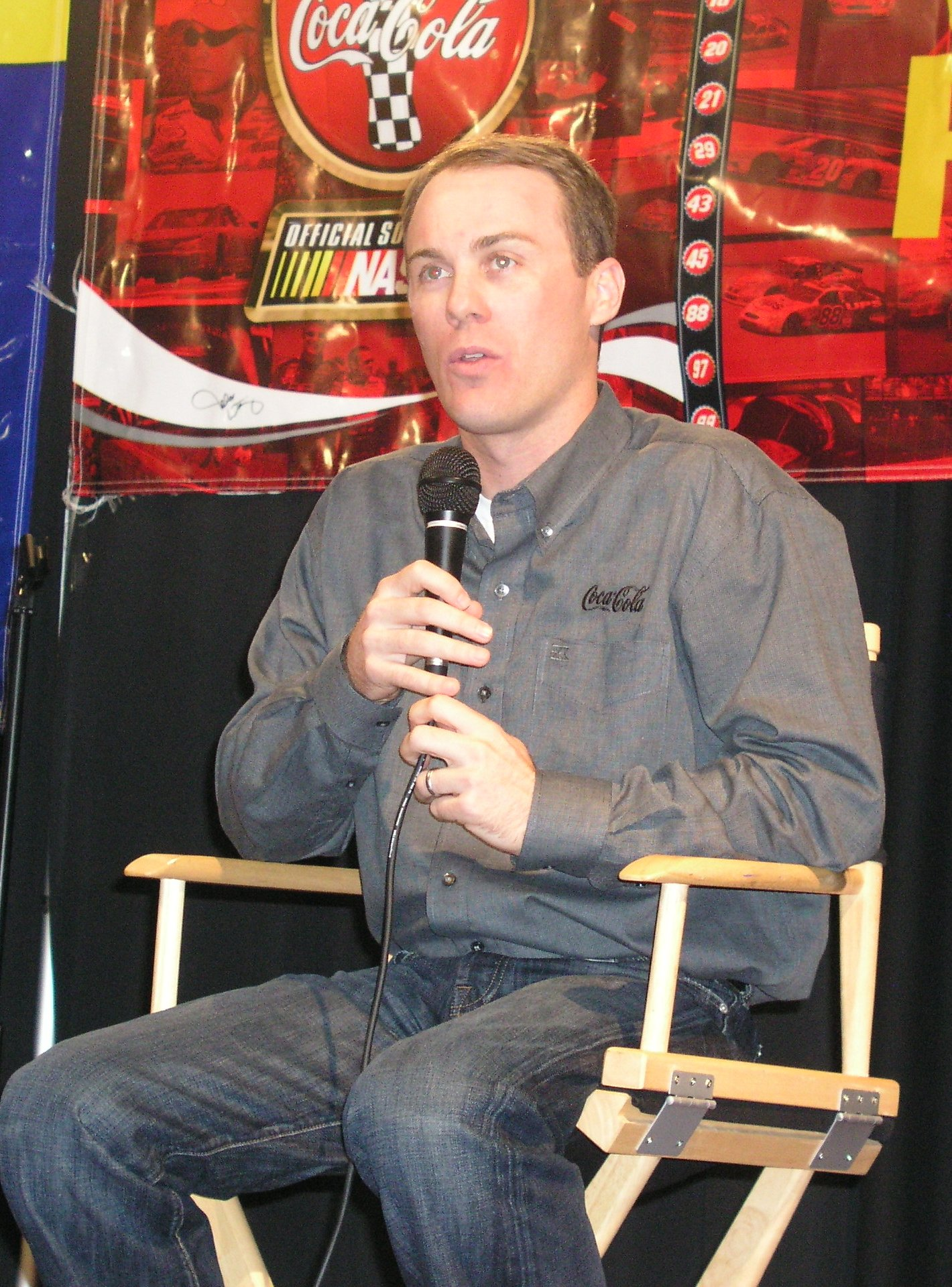
Kevin Harvick remained the Drivers' Championship leader after finishing first in the race.

Manufacturers' Championship standings

Pos	Manufacturer	Points
1	Chevrolet	167
2	Toyota	137
3	Ford	106
4	Dodge	96

- Note: Only the top five positions are included for both sets of standings.
- * This driver clinched a position in the Chase for the Sprint Cup.

Previous race: 2010 Heluva Good! Sour Cream Dips at the Glen	Sprint Cup Series; 2010 season	Next race: 2010 Irwin Tools Night Race
