= 2004 Checker Auto Parts 500 =

Race details
- Race 34 of 36 in the 2004 NASCAR Nextel Cup Series
- The 2004 Checker Auto Parts 500 program cover.
- Date: November 7, 2004
- Official name: 17th Annual Checker Auto Parts 500
- Location: Avondale, Arizona, Phoenix International Raceway
- Course: Permanent racing facility
- Course length: 1 miles (1.6 km)
- Distance: 315 laps, 315 mi (506.943 km)
- Scheduled distance: 312 laps, 312 mi (502.115 km)
- Average speed: 94.848 miles per hour (152.643 km/h)
- Attendance: 105,000

Pole position
Driver	Ryan Newman	Penske-Jasper Racing
- Time: 26.499

Most laps led
Driver	Dale Earnhardt Jr.	Dale Earnhardt, Inc.
- Laps: 118

Winner
No. 8	Dale Earnhardt Jr.	Dale Earnhardt, Inc.

Television in the United States
- Network: NBC
- Announcers: Allen Bestwick, Benny Parsons, Wally Dallenbach Jr.

Radio in the United States
- Radio: Motor Racing Network

The 2004 Checker Auto Parts 500 was the 34th stock car race of the 2004 NASCAR Nextel Cup Series season, the eighth race of the 2004 Chase for the Nextel Cup, and the 17th iteration of the event. The race was held on Sunday, November 7, 2004, before a crowd of 105,000 in Avondale, Arizona at Phoenix International Raceway, a 1-mile (1.6 km) permanent low-banked tri-oval race track. The race was extended from its scheduled 312 laps to 315 due to a green–white–checker finish. On the final restart, Dale Earnhardt, Inc. driver Dale Earnhardt Jr. would hold off the field on the final restart to win his 15th career NASCAR Nextel Cup Series win and his sixth and final win of the season. To fill out the podium, Ryan Newman of Penske-Jasper Racing and Jeff Gordon of Hendrick Motorsports would finish second and third, respectively.

== Background ==
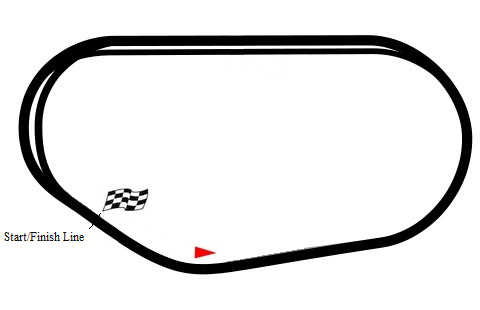
The layout of Phoenix International Raceway, the venue where the race was held.

Phoenix International Raceway – also known as PIR – is a one-mile, low-banked tri-oval race track located in Avondale, Arizona. It is named after the nearby metropolitan area of Phoenix. The motorsport track opened in 1964 and currently hosts two NASCAR race weekends annually. PIR has also hosted the IndyCar Series, CART, USAC and the Rolex Sports Car Series. The raceway is currently owned and operated by International Speedway Corporation.

The raceway was originally constructed with a 2.5 mi (4.0 km) road course that ran both inside and outside of the main tri-oval. In 1991 the track was reconfigured with the current 1.51 mi (2.43 km) interior layout. PIR has an estimated grandstand seating capacity of around 67,000. Lights were installed around the track in 2004 following the addition of a second annual NASCAR race weekend.

=== Entry list ===
#	Driver	Team	Make	Sponsor
0	Ward Burton	Haas CNC Racing	Chevrolet	NetZero Hi Speed
00	Ryan McGlynn	McGlynn Racing	Chevrolet	Howes Lubricator, Buyer's Choice Auto Warranties
01	Joe Nemechek	MBV Motorsports	Chevrolet	U. S. Army
2	Rusty Wallace	Penske-Jasper Racing	Dodge	Miller Lite
02	Hermie Sadler	SCORE Motorsports	Chevrolet	Treasure Island Hotel and Casino
4	Mike Wallace	Morgan–McClure Motorsports	Chevrolet	Lucas Oil, Love's
5	Terry Labonte	Hendrick Motorsports	Chevrolet	Kellogg's, The Incredibles
6	Mark Martin	Roush Racing	Ford	Viagra
8	Dale Earnhardt Jr.	Dale Earnhardt, Inc.	Chevrolet	Budweiser
9	Kasey Kahne	Evernham Motorsports	Dodge	Dodge Dealers, UAW
09	Johnny Sauter	Phoenix Racing	Dodge	Miccosukee Resort & Gaming
10	Scott Riggs	MBV Motorsports	Chevrolet	Valvoline
12	Ryan Newman	Penske-Jasper Racing	Dodge	Alltel TXT2WINMVP
14	John Andretti	ppc Racing	Ford	A-Plus, VB
15	Michael Waltrip	Dale Earnhardt, Inc.	Chevrolet	NAPA Auto Parts
16	Greg Biffle	Roush Racing	Ford	National Guard
17	Matt Kenseth	Roush Racing	Ford	DeWalt Power Tools
18	Bobby Labonte	Joe Gibbs Racing	Chevrolet	Interstate Batteries
19	Jeremy Mayfield	Evernham Motorsports	Dodge	Dodge Dealers, UAW
20	Tony Stewart	Joe Gibbs Racing	Chevrolet	The Home Depot
21	Ricky Rudd	Wood Brothers Racing	Ford	Motorcraft
22	Scott Wimmer	Bill Davis Racing	Dodge	Caterpillar
24	Jeff Gordon	Hendrick Motorsports	Chevrolet	DuPont "Always In Our Hearts"
25	Brian Vickers	Hendrick Motorsports	Chevrolet	GMAC Financial Services "Always In Our Hearts"
29	Kevin Harvick	Richard Childress Racing	Chevrolet	GM Goodwrench
30	Jeff Burton	Richard Childress Racing	Chevrolet	America Online
31	Robby Gordon	Richard Childress Racing	Chevrolet	Cingular Wireless
32	Bobby Hamilton Jr.	PPI Motorsports	Chevrolet	Tide, The Incredibles
37	Kevin Lepage	R&J Racing	Dodge	R&J Racing
38	Elliott Sadler	Robert Yates Racing	Ford	Pedigree
40	Sterling Marlin	Chip Ganassi Racing	Dodge	Coors Light, U.S. Marine Corps
41	Casey Mears	Chip Ganassi Racing	Dodge	Target
42	Jamie McMurray	Chip Ganassi Racing	Dodge	Texaco, Havoline
43	Jeff Green	Petty Enterprises	Dodge	Cheerios, Betty Crocker
45	Kyle Petty	Petty Enterprises	Dodge	Georgia-Pacific Brawny
48	Jimmie Johnson	Hendrick Motorsports	Chevrolet	Lowe's "Always In Our Hearts"
49	Ken Schrader	BAM Racing	Dodge	Schwan's Home Service
50	Todd Bodine	Arnold Motorsports	Dodge	Arnold Motorsports
51	Tony Raines	Competitive Edge Motorsports	Chevrolet	Marathon Oil
72	Kirk Shelmerdine	Kirk Shelmerdine Racing	Ford	Freddie B's
75	Mike Garvey	Haefele Racing	Dodge	Jani-King
77	Brendan Gaughan	Penske-Jasper Racing	Dodge	Kodak
80	Mario Gosselin	Hover Motorsports	Ford	Hover Motorsports
88	Dale Jarrett	Robert Yates Racing	Ford	UPS
89	Morgan Shepherd	Shepherd Racing Ventures	Dodge	Racing with Jesus "Keep The Passion Going"
93	Geoff Bodine	GIC–Mixon Motorsports	Chevrolet	Quality Plus Services
94	Stanton Barrett	W. W. Motorsports	Ford	W. W. Motorsports
97	Kurt Busch	Roush Racing	Ford	Irwin Industrial Tools
98	Randy LaJoie	Mach 1 Motorsports	Ford	Airaid
99	Carl Edwards	Roush Racing	Ford	Roush Racing
Official entry list

== Practice ==
=== First practice ===
The first practice session was held on Friday, November 5, at 9:20 AM PST, and would last for two hours. Ryan Newman of Penske-Jasper Racing would set the fastest time in the session, with a lap of 26.697 and an average speed of 134.847 miles per hour (217.015 km/h).

Pos.	#	Driver	Team	Make	Time	Speed
1	12	Ryan Newman	Penske-Jasper Racing	Dodge	26.697	134.847
2	29	Kevin Harvick	Richard Childress Racing	Chevrolet	26.950	133.581
3	9	Kasey Kahne	Evernham Motorsports	Dodge	26.955	133.556
Full first practice results

=== Second practice ===
The second practice session was held on Saturday, November 6, at 8:30 AM PST, and would last for 45 minutes. Matt Kenseth of Roush Racing would set the fastest time in the session, with a lap of 27.526 and an average speed of 130.785 miles per hour (210.478 km/h).

Pos.	#	Driver	Team	Make	Time	Speed
1	17	Matt Kenseth	Roush Racing	Ford	27.526	130.785
2	29	Kevin Harvick	Richard Childress Racing	Chevrolet	27.559	130.629
3	97	Kurt Busch	Roush Racing	Ford	27.578	130.539
Full second practice results

=== Third and final practice ===
The third and final practice session, sometimes referred to as Happy Hour, was held on Saturday, November 6, at 10:10 AM PST, and would last for 45 minutes. Robby Gordon of Richard Childress Racing would set the fastest time in the session, with a lap of 27.626 and an average speed of 130.312 miles per hour (209.717 km/h).

Pos.	#	Driver	Team	Make	Time	Speed
1	31	Robby Gordon	Richard Childress Racing	Chevrolet	27.626	130.312
2	9	Kasey Kahne	Evernham Motorsports	Dodge	27.754	129.711
3	2	Rusty Wallace	Penske-Jasper Racing	Dodge	27.786	129.562
Full Happy Hour practice results

== Qualifying ==
Qualifying was held on Friday, November 5, at 1:10 PM PST. Each driver would have two laps to set a fastest time; the fastest of the two would count as their official qualifying lap. Positions 1-38 would be decided on time, while positions 39-43 would be based on provisionals. Four spots are awarded by the use of provisionals based on owner's points. The fifth is awarded to a past champion who has not otherwise qualified for the race. If no past champ needs the provisional, the next team in the owner points will be awarded a provisional.

Ryan Newman of Penske-Jasper Racing would win the pole, setting a time of 14.930 and an average speed of 128.520 miles per hour (206.833 km/h).

Seven drivers failed to qualify: Mike Garvey, Tony Raines, Stanton Barrett, Mario Gosselin, Ryan McGlynn, Kirk Shelmerdine, and Geoff Bodine.

=== Full qualifying results ===
Pos.	#	Driver	Team	Make	Time	Speed
1	12	Ryan Newman	Penske-Jasper Racing	Dodge	26.499	135.854
2	25	Brian Vickers	Hendrick Motorsports	Chevrolet	26.890	133.879
3	01	Joe Nemechek	MBV Motorsports	Chevrolet	26.937	133.645
4	9	Kasey Kahne	Evernham Motorsports	Dodge	26.950	133.581
5	29	Kevin Harvick	Richard Childress Racing	Chevrolet	26.979	133.437
6	20	Tony Stewart	Joe Gibbs Racing	Chevrolet	26.980	133.432
7	41	Casey Mears	Chip Ganassi Racing	Dodge	27.006	133.304
8	24	Jeff Gordon	Hendrick Motorsports	Chevrolet	27.044	133.116
9	38	Elliott Sadler	Robert Yates Racing	Ford	27.045	133.111
10	42	Jamie McMurray	Chip Ganassi Racing	Dodge	27.050	133.087
11	10	Scott Riggs	MBV Motorsports	Chevrolet	27.068	132.998
12	43	Jeff Green	Petty Enterprises	Dodge	27.088	132.900
13	48	Jimmie Johnson	Hendrick Motorsports	Chevrolet	27.093	132.876
14	8	Dale Earnhardt Jr.	Dale Earnhardt, Inc.	Chevrolet	27.101	132.836
15	2	Rusty Wallace	Penske-Jasper Racing	Dodge	27.126	132.714
16	17	Matt Kenseth	Roush Racing	Ford	27.160	132.548
17	31	Robby Gordon	Richard Childress Racing	Chevrolet	27.165	132.523
18	49	Ken Schrader	BAM Racing	Dodge	27.172	132.489
19	15	Michael Waltrip	Dale Earnhardt, Inc.	Chevrolet	27.183	132.436
20	30	Jeff Burton	Richard Childress Racing	Chevrolet	27.219	132.261
21	14	John Andretti	ppc Racing	Ford	27.237	132.173
22	6	Mark Martin	Roush Racing	Ford	27.251	132.105
23	16	Greg Biffle	Roush Racing	Ford	27.261	132.057
24	19	Jeremy Mayfield	Evernham Motorsports	Dodge	27.280	131.965
25	21	Ricky Rudd	Wood Brothers Racing	Ford	27.309	131.825
26	88	Dale Jarrett	Robert Yates Racing	Ford	27.318	131.781
27	18	Bobby Labonte	Joe Gibbs Racing	Chevrolet	27.324	131.752
28	97	Kurt Busch	Roush Racing	Ford	27.340	131.675
29	99	Carl Edwards	Roush Racing	Ford	27.347	131.641
30	09	Johnny Sauter	Phoenix Racing	Dodge	27.394	131.416
31	5	Terry Labonte	Hendrick Motorsports	Chevrolet	27.406	131.358
32	32	Bobby Hamilton Jr.	PPI Motorsports	Chevrolet	27.435	131.219
34	4	Mike Wallace	Morgan–McClure Motorsports	Chevrolet	27.453	131.133
33	45	Kyle Petty	Petty Enterprises	Dodge	27.481	131.000
35	40	Sterling Marlin	Chip Ganassi Racing	Dodge	27.524	130.795
36	50	Todd Bodine	Arnold Motorsports	Dodge	27.539	130.724
37	37	Kevin Lepage	R&J Racing	Dodge	27.574	130.558
38	22	Scott Wimmer	Bill Davis Racing	Dodge	27.603	130.421
Provisionals
39	0	Ward Burton	Haas CNC Racing	Chevrolet	27.684	130.039
40	77	Brendan Gaughan	Penske-Jasper Racing	Dodge	27.630	130.293
41	98	Randy LaJoie	Mach 1 Motorsports	Ford	27.664	130.133
42	02	Hermie Sadler	SCORE Motorsports	Chevrolet	27.995	128.594
43	89	Morgan Shepherd	Shepherd Racing Ventures	Dodge	28.147	127.900
Failed to qualify
44	75	Mike Garvey	Haefele Racing	Dodge	27.625	130.317
45	51	Tony Raines	Competitive Edge Motorsports	Chevrolet	27.662	130.142
46	94	Stanton Barrett	W. W. Motorsports	Ford	27.927	128.908
47	80	Mario Gosselin	Hover Motorsports	Ford	28.123	128.009
48	00	Ryan McGlynn	McGlynn Racing	Chevrolet	28.218	127.578
49	72	Kirk Shelmerdine	Kirk Shelmerdine Racing	Ford	—	—
50	93	Geoff Bodine	GIC–Mixon Motorsports	Chevrolet	—	—
Official qualifying results

== Race results ==
Fin	St	#	Driver	Team	Make	Laps	Led	Status	Pts	Winnings
1	14	8	Dale Earnhardt Jr.	Dale Earnhardt, Inc.	Chevrolet	315	118	running	190	$274,503
2	1	12	Ryan Newman	Penske-Jasper Racing	Dodge	315	59	running	175	$181,167
3	8	24	Jeff Gordon	Hendrick Motorsports	Chevrolet	315	100	running	170	$170,503
4	5	29	Kevin Harvick	Richard Childress Racing	Chevrolet	315	0	running	160	$134,938
5	4	9	Kasey Kahne	Evernham Motorsports	Dodge	315	0	running	155	$126,950
6	13	48	Jimmie Johnson	Hendrick Motorsports	Chevrolet	315	0	running	150	$96,225
7	15	2	Rusty Wallace	Penske-Jasper Racing	Dodge	315	0	running	146	$111,658
8	6	20	Tony Stewart	Joe Gibbs Racing	Chevrolet	315	0	running	142	$112,028
9	27	18	Bobby Labonte	Joe Gibbs Racing	Chevrolet	315	4	running	143	$113,083
10	28	97	Kurt Busch	Roush Racing	Ford	315	14	running	139	$84,300
11	20	30	Jeff Burton	Richard Childress Racing	Chevrolet	315	0	running	130	$72,500
12	3	01	Joe Nemechek	MBV Motorsports	Chevrolet	315	0	running	127	$88,200
13	23	16	Greg Biffle	Roush Racing	Ford	315	0	running	124	$70,225
14	11	10	Scott Riggs	MBV Motorsports	Chevrolet	315	0	running	121	$85,187
15	22	6	Mark Martin	Roush Racing	Ford	315	0	running	118	$67,975
16	32	32	Bobby Hamilton Jr.	PPI Motorsports	Chevrolet	315	0	running	115	$80,950
17	19	15	Michael Waltrip	Dale Earnhardt, Inc.	Chevrolet	315	0	running	112	$91,006
18	2	25	Brian Vickers	Hendrick Motorsports	Chevrolet	315	0	running	109	$65,825
19	25	21	Ricky Rudd	Wood Brothers Racing	Ford	315	0	running	106	$83,081
20	18	49	Ken Schrader	BAM Racing	Dodge	315	0	running	103	$57,300
21	24	19	Jeremy Mayfield	Evernham Motorsports	Dodge	315	0	running	100	$78,525
22	26	88	Dale Jarrett	Robert Yates Racing	Ford	315	0	running	97	$87,767
23	12	43	Jeff Green	Petty Enterprises	Dodge	315	0	running	94	$82,375
24	10	42	Jamie McMurray	Chip Ganassi Racing	Dodge	315	0	running	91	$64,800
25	35	40	Sterling Marlin	Chip Ganassi Racing	Dodge	314	0	running	88	$89,050
26	38	22	Scott Wimmer	Bill Davis Racing	Dodge	314	0	running	85	$73,925
27	37	37	Kevin Lepage	R&J Racing	Dodge	314	0	running	82	$52,300
28	34	45	Kyle Petty	Petty Enterprises	Dodge	313	0	running	79	$63,564
29	33	4	Mike Wallace	Morgan–McClure Motorsports	Chevrolet	313	0	running	76	$54,550
30	40	77	Brendan Gaughan	Penske-Jasper Racing	Dodge	311	0	running	73	$59,925
31	21	14	John Andretti	ppc Racing	Ford	311	0	running	70	$52,300
32	31	5	Terry Labonte	Hendrick Motorsports	Chevrolet	309	0	running	67	$78,400
33	42	02	Hermie Sadler	SCORE Motorsports	Chevrolet	307	0	running	64	$52,450
34	7	41	Casey Mears	Chip Ganassi Racing	Dodge	306	0	crash	61	$51,400
35	17	31	Robby Gordon	Richard Childress Racing	Chevrolet	306	0	engine	58	$86,462
36	16	17	Matt Kenseth	Roush Racing	Ford	280	4	engine	60	$101,903
37	29	99	Carl Edwards	Roush Racing	Ford	272	0	running	52	$84,417
38	9	38	Elliott Sadler	Robert Yates Racing	Ford	252	16	running	54	$89,708
39	30	09	Johnny Sauter	Phoenix Racing	Dodge	236	0	crash	46	$50,750
40	39	0	Ward Burton	Haas CNC Racing	Chevrolet	201	0	rear end	43	$50,600
41	43	89	Morgan Shepherd	Shepherd Racing Ventures	Dodge	181	0	handling	40	$50,460
42	41	98	Randy LaJoie	Mach 1 Motorsports	Ford	105	0	transmission	37	$50,335
43	36	50	Todd Bodine	Arnold Motorsports	Dodge	11	0	vibration	34	$50,447
Failed to qualify
44		75	Mike Garvey	Haefele Racing	Dodge					
45		51	Tony Raines	Competitive Edge Motorsports	Chevrolet					
46		94	Stanton Barrett	W. W. Motorsports	Ford					
47		80	Mario Gosselin	Hover Motorsports	Ford					
48		00	Ryan McGlynn	McGlynn Racing	Chevrolet					
49		72	Kirk Shelmerdine	Kirk Shelmerdine Racing	Ford					
50		93	Geoff Bodine	GIC–Mixon Motorsports	Chevrolet					
Official race results

Previous race: 2004 Bass Pro Shops MBNA 500	NASCAR Nextel Cup Series; 2004 season	Next race: 2004 Mountain Dew Southern 500
