= 2004 Chevy Rock & Roll 400 =

26th race of the 2004 NASCAR Nextel Cup Series

Race details
- Race 26 of 36 in the 2004 NASCAR Nextel Cup Series
- The 2004 Chevy Rock and Roll 400 program cover.
- Date: September 11, 2004
- Official name: 47th Annual Chevy Rock & Roll 400
- Location: Richmond, Virginia, Richmond International Raceway
- Course: Permanent racing facility
- Course length: 0.75 miles (1.21 km)
- Distance: 400 laps, 300 mi (482.803 km)
- Scheduled distance: 400 laps, 300 mi (482.803 km)
- Average speed: 98.946 miles per hour (159.238 km/h)
- Attendance: 110,000

Pole position
Driver	Ryan Newman	Penske-Jasper Racing
- Time: 20.979

Most laps led
Driver	Jeremy Mayfield	Evernham Motorsports
- Laps: 151

Winner
No. 19	Jeremy Mayfield	Evernham Motorsports

Television in the United States
- Network: TNT
- Announcers: Allen Bestwick, Benny Parsons, Wally Dallenbach Jr.

Radio in the United States
- Radio: Motor Racing Network

The 2004 Chevy Rock and Roll 400 was the 26th stock car race of the 2004 NASCAR Nextel Cup Series season, the final race of the 2004 NASCAR regular season, and the 47th iteration of the event. The race was held on Saturday, September 11, 2004, before a crowd of 110,000 in Richmond, Virginia, at Richmond International Raceway, a 0.75 miles (1.21 km) D-shaped oval. The race took the scheduled 400 laps to complete. At race's end, Jeremy Mayfield of Evernham Motorsports would pass a fuel-ailing Kurt Busch with 8 to go and take home a clutch win to lock himself into the 2004 Chase for the Nextel Cup. The race was Mayfield's fourth career NASCAR Nextel Cup Series win and his first and only win of the season. To fill out the podium, Dale Earnhardt Jr. of Dale Earnhardt, Inc. and Jeff Gordon of Hendrick Motorsports would finish second and third, respectively.

The ten drivers to make it into the inaugural Chase for the Nextel Cup were Jeff Gordon, Jimmie Johnson, Dale Earnhardt Jr., Tony Stewart, Matt Kenseth, Elliott Sadler, Kurt Busch, Mark Martin, Jeremy Mayfield, and Ryan Newman.

== Background ==
The layout of Richmond International Raceway, the venue where the race was at.

Richmond International Raceway (RIR) is a 3/4-mile (1.2 km), D-shaped, asphalt race track located just outside Richmond, Virginia in Henrico County. Known as "America's premier short track".

=== Entry list ===
#	Driver	Team	Make
0	Ward Burton	Haas CNC Racing	Chevrolet
00	Ryan McGlynn	McGlynn Racing	Chevrolet
01	Joe Nemechek	MBV Motorsports	Chevrolet
2	Rusty Wallace	Penske-Jasper Racing	Dodge
02	Hermie Sadler	SCORE Motorsports	Chevrolet
4	Jimmy Spencer	Morgan–McClure Motorsports	Chevrolet
5	Terry Labonte	Hendrick Motorsports	Chevrolet
6	Mark Martin	Roush Racing	Ford
8	Dale Earnhardt Jr.	Dale Earnhardt, Inc.	Chevrolet
08	Carl Long	Hover Motorsports	Ford
9	Kasey Kahne	Evernham Motorsports	Dodge
09	Mike Wallace	Phoenix Racing	Dodge
10	Scott Riggs	MBV Motorsports	Chevrolet
12	Ryan Newman	Penske-Jasper Racing	Dodge
13	Greg Sacks	Sacks Motorsports	Dodge
15	Michael Waltrip	Dale Earnhardt, Inc.	Chevrolet
16	Greg Biffle	Roush Racing	Ford
17	Matt Kenseth	Roush Racing	Ford
18	Bobby Labonte	Joe Gibbs Racing	Chevrolet
19	Jeremy Mayfield	Evernham Motorsports	Dodge
20	Tony Stewart	Joe Gibbs Racing	Chevrolet
21	Ricky Rudd	Wood Brothers Racing	Ford
22	Scott Wimmer	Bill Davis Racing	Dodge
23	Shane Hmiel	Bill Davis Racing	Dodge
24	Jeff Gordon	Hendrick Motorsports	Chevrolet
25	Brian Vickers	Hendrick Motorsports	Chevrolet
27	David Green	Brewco Motorsports	Chevrolet
29	Kevin Harvick	Richard Childress Racing	Chevrolet
30	Jeff Burton	Richard Childress Racing	Chevrolet
31	Robby Gordon	Richard Childress Racing	Chevrolet
32	Ricky Craven	PPI Motorsports	Chevrolet
33	Johnny Sauter	Richard Childress Racing	Chevrolet
37	Kevin Lepage	R&J Racing	Dodge
38	Elliott Sadler	Robert Yates Racing	Ford
40	Sterling Marlin	Chip Ganassi Racing	Dodge
41	Casey Mears	Chip Ganassi Racing	Dodge
42	Jamie McMurray	Chip Ganassi Racing	Dodge
43	Jeff Green	Petty Enterprises	Dodge
45	Kyle Petty	Petty Enterprises	Dodge
48	Jimmie Johnson	Hendrick Motorsports	Chevrolet
49	Ken Schrader	BAM Racing	Dodge
50	Todd Bodine	Arnold Motorsports	Dodge
51	Tony Raines	Competitive Edge Motorsports	Chevrolet
72	Kirk Shelmerdine	Kirk Shelmerdine Racing	Ford
75	Mike Garvey*	Haefele Racing	Dodge
77	Brendan Gaughan	Penske-Jasper Racing	Dodge
80	Mike Bliss	Joe Gibbs Racing	Chevrolet
88	Dale Jarrett	Robert Yates Racing	Ford
89	Morgan Shepherd	Shepherd Racing Ventures	Dodge
92	Brad Teague	Front Row Motorsports	Ford
97	Kurt Busch	Roush Racing	Ford
98	Derrike Cope	Mach 1 Motorsports	Ford
99	Carl Edwards	Roush Racing	Ford
Official entry list

*Withdrew.

== Practice ==
=== First practice ===
The first practice session was held on Friday, September 10, at 11:20 AM EST, and would last for two hours. Ryan Newman of Penske-Jasper Racing would set the fastest time in the session, with a lap of 21.024 and an average speed of 128.425 miles per hour (206.680 km/h).

Pos.	#	Driver	Team	Make	Time	Speed
1	12	Ryan Newman	Penske-Jasper Racing	Dodge	21.024	128.425
2	9	Kasey Kahne	Evernham Motorsports	Dodge	21.184	127.455
3	48	Jimmie Johnson	Hendrick Motorsports	Chevrolet	21.211	127.292
Full first practice results

=== Second and final practice ===
The second and final practice session, sometimes referred to as Happy Hour, was held on Friday, September 10, at 6:00 PM EST, and would last for one hour and 15 minutes. Kasey Kahne of Evernham Motorsports would set the fastest time in the session, with a lap of 21.480 and an average speed of 125.698 miles per hour (202.291 km/h).

Pos.	#	Driver	Team	Make	Time	Speed
1	9	Kasey Kahne	Evernham Motorsports	Dodge	21.480	125.698
2	97	Kurt Busch	Roush Racing	Ford	21.488	125.651
3	12	Ryan Newman	Penske-Jasper Racing	Dodge	21.560	125.232
Full Happy Hour practice results

== Qualifying ==
Qualifying was held on Friday, September 10, at 3:10 PM EST. Each driver would have two laps to set a fastest time; the fastest of the two would count as their official qualifying lap. Positions 1-38 would be decided on time, while positions 39-43 would be based on provisionals. Four spots are awarded by the use of provisionals based on owner's points. The fifth is awarded to a past champion who has not otherwise qualified for the race. If no past champ needs the provisional, the next team in the owner points will be awarded a provisional.

Ryan Newman of Penske-Jasper Racing would win the pole, setting a time of 20.979 and an average speed of 128.700 miles per hour (207.123 km/h).

Nine drivers would fail to qualify: Johnny Sauter, Tony Raines, Kevin Lepage, Greg Sacks, Hermie Sadler, Brad Teague, Ryan McGlynn, Morgan Shepherd, and Carl Long.

=== Full qualifying results ===
Pos.	#	Driver	Team	Make	Time	Speed
1	12	Ryan Newman	Penske-Jasper Racing	Dodge	20.979	128.700
2	6	Mark Martin	Roush Racing	Ford	21.192	127.407
3	48	Jimmie Johnson	Hendrick Motorsports	Chevrolet	21.195	127.388
4	01	Joe Nemechek	MBV Motorsports	Chevrolet	21.225	127.209
5	30	Jeff Burton	Richard Childress Racing	Chevrolet	21.225	127.209
6	21	Ricky Rudd	Wood Brothers Racing	Ford	21.237	127.137
7	19	Jeremy Mayfield	Evernham Motorsports	Dodge	21.247	127.077
8	16	Greg Biffle	Roush Racing	Ford	21.252	127.047
9	24	Jeff Gordon	Hendrick Motorsports	Chevrolet	21.259	127.005
10	43	Jeff Green	Petty Enterprises	Dodge	21.260	126.999
11	9	Kasey Kahne	Evernham Motorsports	Dodge	21.263	126.981
12	2	Rusty Wallace	Penske-Jasper Racing	Dodge	21.303	126.743
13	99	Carl Edwards	Roush Racing	Ford	21.306	126.725
14	8	Dale Earnhardt Jr.	Dale Earnhardt, Inc.	Chevrolet	21.308	126.713
15	20	Tony Stewart	Joe Gibbs Racing	Chevrolet	21.315	126.671
16	17	Matt Kenseth	Roush Racing	Ford	21.317	126.660
17	97	Kurt Busch	Roush Racing	Ford	21.321	126.636
18	18	Bobby Labonte	Joe Gibbs Racing	Chevrolet	21.325	126.612
19	15	Michael Waltrip	Dale Earnhardt, Inc.	Chevrolet	21.334	126.559
20	38	Elliott Sadler	Robert Yates Racing	Ford	21.342	126.511
21	22	Scott Wimmer	Bill Davis Racing	Dodge	21.349	126.470
22	32	Bobby Hamilton Jr.	PPI Motorsports	Chevrolet	21.360	126.405
23	5	Terry Labonte	Hendrick Motorsports	Chevrolet	21.368	126.357
24	40	Sterling Marlin	Chip Ganassi Racing	Dodge	21.371	126.339
25	88	Dale Jarrett	Robert Yates Racing	Ford	21.395	126.198
26	25	Brian Vickers	Hendrick Motorsports	Chevrolet	21.407	126.127
27	29	Kevin Harvick	Richard Childress Racing	Chevrolet	21.423	126.033
28	31	Robby Gordon	Richard Childress Racing	Chevrolet	21.447	125.892
29	41	Casey Mears	Chip Ganassi Racing	Dodge	21.460	125.815
30	23	Shane Hmiel	Bill Davis Racing	Dodge	21.465	125.786
31	45	Kyle Petty	Petty Enterprises	Dodge	21.468	125.769
32	49	Ken Schrader	BAM Racing	Dodge	21.470	125.757
33	80	Mike Bliss	Joe Gibbs Racing	Chevrolet	21.474	125.733
34	27	David Green	Brewco Motorsports	Chevrolet	21.474	125.733
35	10	Scott Riggs	MBV Motorsports	Chevrolet	21.502	125.570
36	42	Jamie McMurray	Chip Ganassi Racing	Dodge	21.503	125.564
37	77	Brendan Gaughan	Penske-Jasper Racing	Dodge	21.514	125.500
38	0	Ward Burton	Haas CNC Racing	Chevrolet	21.541	125.342
Provisionals
39	4	Jimmy Spencer	Morgan–McClure Motorsports	Chevrolet	21.694	124.458
40	50	Todd Bodine	Arnold Motorsports	Dodge	21.711	124.361
41	09	Mike Wallace	Phoenix Racing	Dodge	21.591	125.052
42	98	Derrike Cope	Mach 1 Motorsports	Ford	21.722	124.298
43	72	Kirk Shelmerdine	Kirk Shelmerdine Racing	Ford	22.186	121.698
Failed to qualify or withdrew
44	33	Johnny Sauter	Richard Childress Racing	Chevrolet	21.579	125.122
45	51	Tony Raines	Competitive Edge Motorsports	Chevrolet	21.610	124.942
46	37	Kevin Lepage	R&J Racing	Dodge	21.638	124.781
47	13	Greg Sacks	Sacks Motorsports	Dodge	21.834	123.660
48	02	Hermie Sadler	SCORE Motorsports	Chevrolet	21.980	122.839
49	92	Brad Teague	Front Row Motorsports	Ford	22.095	122.200
50	00	Ryan McGlynn	McGlynn Racing	Chevrolet	22.243	121.386
51	89	Morgan Shepherd	Shepherd Racing Ventures	Dodge	22.388	120.600
52	08	Carl Long	Hover Motorsports	Ford	—	—
WD	75	Mike Garvey	Haefele Racing	Dodge	—	—
Official qualifying results

== Race results ==
Fin	#	Driver	Team	Make	Laps	Led	Status	Pts
1	19	Jeremy Mayfield	Evernham Motorsports	Dodge	400	151	running	190
2	8	Dale Earnhardt Jr.	Dale Earnhardt, Inc.	Chevrolet	400	42	running	175
3	24	Jeff Gordon	Hendrick Motorsports	Chevrolet	400	20	running	170
4	80	Mike Bliss	Joe Gibbs Racing	Chevrolet	400	0	running	160
5	6	Mark Martin	Roush Racing	Ford	400	0	running	155
6	99	Carl Edwards	Roush Racing	Ford	400	0	running	150
7	09	Mike Wallace	Phoenix Racing	Dodge	400	45	running	151
8	16	Greg Biffle	Roush Racing	Ford	400	0	running	142
9	42	Jamie McMurray	Chip Ganassi Racing	Dodge	400	0	running	138
10	2	Rusty Wallace	Penske-Jasper Racing	Dodge	400	0	running	134
11	32	Bobby Hamilton Jr.	PPI Motorsports	Chevrolet	400	0	running	130
12	29	Kevin Harvick	Richard Childress Racing	Chevrolet	400	0	running	127
13	15	Michael Waltrip	Dale Earnhardt, Inc.	Chevrolet	399	0	running	124
14	40	Sterling Marlin	Chip Ganassi Racing	Dodge	399	0	running	121
15	97	Kurt Busch	Roush Racing	Ford	399	94	running	123
16	18	Bobby Labonte	Joe Gibbs Racing	Chevrolet	399	0	running	115
17	38	Elliott Sadler	Robert Yates Racing	Ford	399	0	running	112
18	5	Terry Labonte	Hendrick Motorsports	Chevrolet	399	0	running	109
19	20	Tony Stewart	Joe Gibbs Racing	Chevrolet	399	0	running	106
20	12	Ryan Newman	Penske-Jasper Racing	Dodge	399	3	running	108
21	21	Ricky Rudd	Wood Brothers Racing	Ford	399	0	running	100
22	01	Joe Nemechek	MBV Motorsports	Chevrolet	399	0	running	97
23	30	Jeff Burton	Richard Childress Racing	Chevrolet	399	8	running	99
24	9	Kasey Kahne	Evernham Motorsports	Dodge	399	0	running	91
25	43	Jeff Green	Petty Enterprises	Dodge	399	0	running	88
26	88	Dale Jarrett	Robert Yates Racing	Ford	398	0	running	85
27	77	Brendan Gaughan	Penske-Jasper Racing	Dodge	398	0	running	82
28	17	Matt Kenseth	Roush Racing	Ford	397	5	running	84
29	23	Shane Hmiel	Bill Davis Racing	Dodge	397	0	running	76
30	49	Ken Schrader	BAM Racing	Dodge	397	0	running	73
31	27	David Green	Brewco Motorsports	Chevrolet	397	0	running	70
32	31	Robby Gordon	Richard Childress Racing	Chevrolet	396	0	running	67
33	4	Jimmy Spencer	Morgan–McClure Motorsports	Chevrolet	392	0	running	64
34	45	Kyle Petty	Petty Enterprises	Dodge	392	0	running	61
35	41	Casey Mears	Chip Ganassi Racing	Dodge	352	0	running	58
36	48	Jimmie Johnson	Hendrick Motorsports	Chevrolet	338	32	running	60
37	25	Brian Vickers	Hendrick Motorsports	Chevrolet	335	0	running	52
38	22	Scott Wimmer	Bill Davis Racing	Dodge	297	0	running	49
39	10	Scott Riggs	MBV Motorsports	Chevrolet	292	0	ignition	46
40	0	Ward Burton	Haas CNC Racing	Chevrolet	192	0	crash	43
41	72	Kirk Shelmerdine	Kirk Shelmerdine Racing	Ford	87	0	brakes	40
42	98	Derrike Cope	Mach 1 Motorsports	Ford	30	0	ignition	37
43	50	Todd Bodine	Arnold Motorsports	Dodge	9	0	crash	34
Official race results

Previous race: 2004 Pop Secret 500	NASCAR Nextel Cup Series; 2004 season	Next race: 2004 Sylvania 300
