= 2005 MBNA NASCAR RacePoints 400 =

28th race of the 2005 NASCAR Nextel Cup Series

Race details
- Race 28 of 36 in the 2005 NASCAR Nextel Cup Series
- The 2005 MBNA NASCAR RacePoints 400 program cover.
- Date: September 25, 2005
- Official name: 37th Annual MBNA NASCAR RacePoints 400
- Location: Dover, Delaware, Dover International Speedway
- Course: Permanent racing facility
- Course length: 1 miles (1.6 km)
- Distance: 404 laps, 404 mi (650.174 km)
- Scheduled distance: 400 laps, 400 mi (643.737 km)
- Average speed: 119.067 miles per hour (191.620 km/h)
- Attendance: 150,000

Pole position
Driver	Ryan Newman	Penske-Jasper Racing
- Time: 22.770

Most laps led
Driver	Kurt Busch	Roush Racing
- Laps: 192

Winner
No. 48	Jimmie Johnson	Hendrick Motorsports

Television in the United States
- Network: TNT
- Announcers: Bill Weber, Benny Parsons, Wally Dallenbach Jr.

Radio in the United States
- Radio: Motor Racing Network

The 2005 MBNA NASCAR RacePoints 400 28th stock car race of the 2005 NASCAR Nextel Cup Series season, the second race of the 2005 Chase for the Nextel Cup, and the 37th iteration of the event. The race was held on Sunday, September 25, 2005, before a crowd of 150,000 in Dover, Delaware at Dover International Speedway, a 1-mile (1.6 km) permanent oval-shaped racetrack. The race was extended from its scheduled 400 laps to 404 due to a green–white–checker finish. On the final restart, Jimmie Johnson, driving for Hendrick Motorsports, would fend off the field in a fierce restart to take the Chase for the Nextel Cup lead in the standings. The win was Johnson's 17th career NASCAR Nextel Cup Series victory and his third of the season. To fill out the podium, Kyle Busch, driving for Hendrick Motorsports, and Rusty Wallace, driving for Penske-Jasper Racing, would finish second and third, respectively.

== Background ==
The layout of Dover International Speedway, the venue where the race was held.

Dover International Speedway is an oval race track in Dover, Delaware, United States that has held at least two NASCAR races since it opened in 1969. In addition to NASCAR, the track also hosted USAC and the NTT IndyCar Series. The track features one layout, a 1-mile (1.6 km) concrete oval, with 24° banking in the turns and 9° banking on the straights. The speedway is owned and operated by Dover Motorsports.

The track, nicknamed "The Monster Mile", was built in 1969 by Melvin Joseph of Melvin L. Joseph Construction Company, Inc., with an asphalt surface, but was replaced with concrete in 1995. Six years later in 2001, the track's capacity moved to 135,000 seats, making the track have the largest capacity of sports venue in the mid-Atlantic. In 2002, the name changed to Dover International Speedway from Dover Downs International Speedway after Dover Downs Gaming and Entertainment split, making Dover Motorsports. From 2007 to 2009, the speedway worked on an improvement project called "The Monster Makeover", which expanded facilities at the track and beautified the track. After the 2014 season, the track's capacity was reduced to 95,500 seats.

=== Entry list ===
- (R) denotes rookie driver.

#	Driver	Team	Make	Sponsor
0	Mike Bliss	Haas CNC Racing	Chevrolet	Best Buy
00	Carl Long	McGlynn Racing	Chevrolet	Sunquest Vacations, Carloan.com
01	Joe Nemechek	MB2 Motorsports	Chevrolet	U. S. Army
2	Rusty Wallace	Penske Racing	Dodge	Miller Lite
4	Mike Wallace	Morgan–McClure Motorsports	Chevrolet	Lucas Oil
5	Kyle Busch	Hendrick Motorsports	Chevrolet	Kellogg's
6	Mark Martin	Roush Racing	Ford	Viagra
7	Robby Gordon	Robby Gordon Motorsports	Chevrolet	Harrah's
07	Dave Blaney	Richard Childress Racing	Chevrolet	Jack Daniel's
8	Dale Earnhardt Jr.	Dale Earnhardt, Inc.	Chevrolet	Budweiser
08	Ryan McGlynn	McGlynn Racing	Dodge	Royal Administration
9	Kasey Kahne	Evernham Motorsports	Dodge	Dodge
10	Scott Riggs	MBV Motorsports	Chevrolet	Valvoline
11	J. J. Yeley	Joe Gibbs Racing	Chevrolet	FedEx Freight
12	Ryan Newman	Penske Racing	Dodge	Alltel
15	Michael Waltrip	Dale Earnhardt, Inc.	Chevrolet	NAPA Auto Parts
16	Greg Biffle	Roush Racing	Ford	National Guard
17	Matt Kenseth	Roush Racing	Ford	DeWalt
18	Bobby Labonte	Joe Gibbs Racing	Chevrolet	MBNA RacePoints VISA
19	Jeremy Mayfield	Evernham Motorsports	Dodge	Dodge
20	Tony Stewart	Joe Gibbs Racing	Chevrolet	The Home Depot
21	Ricky Rudd	Wood Brothers Racing	Ford	Motorcraft
22	Scott Wimmer	Bill Davis Racing	Dodge	Caterpillar
24	Jeff Gordon	Hendrick Motorsports	Chevrolet	DuPont
25	Brian Vickers	Hendrick Motorsports	Chevrolet	GMAC, ditech.com
29	Kevin Harvick	Richard Childress Racing	Chevrolet	GM Goodwrench
31	Jeff Burton	Richard Childress Racing	Chevrolet	Cingular Wireless
32	Bobby Hamilton Jr.	PPI Motorsports	Chevrolet	Tide
34	Joey McCarthy	Mach 1 Motorsports	Chevrolet	Mach 1 Motorsports
37	Tony Raines	R&J Racing	Dodge	BosPoker
38	Elliott Sadler	Robert Yates Racing	Ford	M&M's
40	Sterling Marlin	Chip Ganassi Racing with Felix Sabates	Dodge	Coors Light
41	Casey Mears	Chip Ganassi Racing with Felix Sabates	Dodge	Target
42	Jamie McMurray	Chip Ganassi Racing with Felix Sabates	Dodge	Texaco, Havoline
43	Jeff Green	Petty Enterprises	Dodge	Cheerios
45	Kyle Petty	Petty Enterprises	Dodge	Georgia-Pacific Brawny
48	Jimmie Johnson	Hendrick Motorsports	Chevrolet	Lowe's
49	Ken Schrader	BAM Racing	Dodge	Red Baron Frozen Pizza
66	Kevin Lepage	Peak Fitness Racing	Ford	EAS
75	Wayne Anderson	Rinaldi Racing	Dodge	Rinaldi Air Conditioning
77	Travis Kvapil	Penske Racing	Dodge	Kodak
78	Kenny Wallace	Furniture Row Racing	Chevrolet	Furniture Row
88	Dale Jarrett	Robert Yates Racing	Ford	UPS
89	Morgan Shepherd	Shepherd Racing Ventures	Dodge	Racing with Jesus
92	Hermie Sadler	Front Row Motorsports	Chevrolet	Front Row Motorsports
95	Stanton Barrett (R)	Stanton Barrett Motorsports	Chevrolet	Stanton Barrett Motorsports
97	Kurt Busch	Roush Racing	Ford	Crown Royal
99	Carl Edwards	Roush Racing	Ford	Office Depot
Official entry list

== Practice ==
=== First practice ===
The first practice session was held on Friday, September 23, at 11:00 AM EST. The session would last for two hours. Greg Biffle, driving for Roush Racing, would set the fastest time in the session, with a lap of 22.830 and an average speed of 157.687 miles per hour (253.773 km/h).

Pos.	#	Driver	Team	Make	Time	Speed
1	16	Greg Biffle	Roush Racing	Ford	22.830	157.687
2	12	Ryan Newman	Penske-Jasper Racing	Dodge	22.879	157.350
3	01	Joe Nemechek	MB2 Motorsports	Chevrolet	22.922	157.054
Full first practice results

=== Second practice ===
The second practice session was held on Saturday, September 24, at 9:30 AM EST. The session would last for 45 minutes. Kurt Busch, driving for Roush Racing, would set the fastest time in the session, with a lap of 23.379 and an average speed of 153.984 miles per hour (247.813 km/h).

Pos.	#	Driver	Team	Make	Time	Speed
1	97	Kurt Busch	Roush Racing	Ford	23.379	153.984
2	6	Mark Martin	Roush Racing	Ford	23.405	153.813
3	29	Kevin Harvick	Richard Childress Racing	Chevrolet	23.409	153.787
Full second practice results

=== Third and final practice ===
The final practice session, sometimes referred to as Happy Hour, was held on Saturday, September 24, at 11:10 AM EST. The session would last for 45 minutes. Kurt Busch, driving for Roush Racing, would set the fastest time in the session, with a lap of 23.235 and an average speed of 154.939 miles per hour (249.350 km/h).

Pos.	#	Driver	Team	Make	Time	Speed
1	97	Kurt Busch	Roush Racing	Ford	23.235	154.939
2	48	Jimmie Johnson	Hendrick Motorsports	Chevrolet	23.240	154.905
3	6	Mark Martin	Roush Racing	Ford	23.264	154.745
Full Happy Hour practice results

== Qualifying ==
Qualifying was held on Friday, September 23, at 3:10 PM EST. Each driver would have two laps to set a fastest time; the fastest of the two would count as their official qualifying lap.

Ryan Newman, driving for Penske-Jasper Racing, would win the pole, setting a time of 22.770 and an average speed of 158.103 miles per hour (254.442 km/h).

Five drivers would fail to qualify: Morgan Shepherd, Hermie Sadler, Ryan McGlynn, Joey McCarthy, and Wayne Anderson.

=== Full qualifying results ===
Pos.	#	Driver	Team	Make	Time	Speed
1	12	Ryan Newman	Penske-Jasper Racing	Dodge	22.770	158.103
2	9	Kasey Kahne	Evernham Motorsports	Dodge	22.919	157.075
3	5	Kyle Busch (R)	Hendrick Motorsports	Chevrolet	22.952	156.849
4	8	Dale Earnhardt Jr.	Dale Earnhardt, Inc.	Chevrolet	22.986	156.617
5	48	Jimmie Johnson	Hendrick Motorsports	Chevrolet	22.993	156.569
6	2	Rusty Wallace	Penske-Jasper Racing	Dodge	23.003	156.501
7	6	Mark Martin	Roush Racing	Ford	23.004	156.495
8	32	Bobby Hamilton Jr.	PPI Motorsports	Chevrolet	23.017	156.406
9	01	Joe Nemechek	MB2 Motorsports	Chevrolet	23.018	156.399
10	97	Kurt Busch	Roush Racing	Ford	23.050	156.182
11	17	Matt Kenseth	Roush Racing	Ford	23.060	156.115
12	19	Jeremy Mayfield	Evernham Motorsports	Dodge	23.081	155.972
13	77	Travis Kvapil (R)	Penske-Jasper Racing	Dodge	23.082	155.966
14	40	Sterling Marlin	Chip Ganassi Racing	Dodge	23.113	155.757
15	88	Dale Jarrett	Robert Yates Racing	Ford	23.122	155.696
16	22	Scott Wimmer	Bill Davis Racing	Dodge	23.132	155.629
17	29	Kevin Harvick	Richard Childress Racing	Chevrolet	23.141	155.568
18	16	Greg Biffle	Roush Racing	Ford	23.154	155.481
19	42	Jamie McMurray	Chip Ganassi Racing	Dodge	23.154	155.481
20	21	Ricky Rudd	Wood Brothers Racing	Ford	23.175	155.340
21	43	Jeff Green	Petty Enterprises	Dodge	23.180	155.306
22	38	Elliott Sadler	Robert Yates Racing	Ford	23.197	155.193
23	41	Casey Mears	Chip Ganassi Racing	Dodge	23.208	155.119
24	07	Dave Blaney	Richard Childress Racing	Chevrolet	23.210	155.106
25	24	Jeff Gordon	Hendrick Motorsports	Chevrolet	23.216	155.066
26	25	Brian Vickers	Hendrick Motorsports	Chevrolet	23.219	155.045
27	15	Michael Waltrip	Dale Earnhardt, Inc.	Chevrolet	23.234	154.945
28	18	Bobby Labonte	Joe Gibbs Racing	Chevrolet	23.239	154.912
29	10	Scott Riggs	MBV Motorsports	Chevrolet	23.245	154.872
30	0	Mike Bliss	Haas CNC Racing	Chevrolet	23.256	154.799
31	20	Tony Stewart	Joe Gibbs Racing	Chevrolet	23.259	154.779
32	99	Carl Edwards	Roush Racing	Ford	23.260	154.772
33	7	Robby Gordon	Robby Gordon Motorsports	Chevrolet	23.272	154.692
34	45	Kyle Petty	Petty Enterprises	Dodge	23.299	154.513
35	66	Kevin Lepage	Peak Fitness Racing	Ford	23.383	153.958
36	31	Jeff Burton	Richard Childress Racing	Chevrolet	23.398	153.859
37	11	J. J. Yeley	Joe Gibbs Racing	Chevrolet	23.433	153.630
38	4	Mike Wallace	Morgan–McClure Motorsports	Chevrolet	23.462	153.440
39	37	Tony Raines	R&J Racing	Dodge	23.531	152.990
40	95	Stanton Barrett (R)	Stanton Barrett Motorsports	Chevrolet	23.550	152.866
41	00	Carl Long	McGlynn Racing	Chevrolet	23.622	152.400
42	49	Ken Schrader	BAM Racing	Dodge	23.765	151.483
43	78	Kenny Wallace	Furniture Row Racing	Chevrolet	23.727	151.726
Failed to qualify
44	89	Morgan Shepherd	Shepherd Racing Ventures	Dodge	23.856	150.905
45	92	Hermie Sadler	Front Row Motorsports	Chevrolet	23.870	150.817
46	08	Ryan McGlynn	McGlynn Racing	Dodge	23.934	150.414
47	34	Joey McCarthy	Mach 1 Motorsports	Chevrolet	23.996	150.025
48	75	Wayne Anderson	Rinaldi Racing	Dodge	-	-
Official qualifying results

== Race results ==
Fin	St	#	Driver	Team	Make	Laps	Led	Status	Pts	Winnings
1	5	48	Jimmie Johnson	Hendrick Motorsports	Chevrolet	404	134	running	185	$296,641
2	3	5	Kyle Busch (R)	Hendrick Motorsports	Chevrolet	404	0	running	170	$164,275
3	6	2	Rusty Wallace	Penske-Jasper Racing	Dodge	404	0	running	165	$157,858
4	7	6	Mark Martin	Roush Racing	Ford	404	7	running	165	$126,550
5	1	12	Ryan Newman	Penske-Jasper Racing	Dodge	404	30	running	160	$155,616
6	22	38	Elliott Sadler	Robert Yates Racing	Ford	404	26	running	155	$129,541
7	12	19	Jeremy Mayfield	Evernham Motorsports	Dodge	404	0	running	146	$114,020
8	34	45	Kyle Petty	Petty Enterprises	Dodge	404	0	running	142	$100,808
9	32	99	Carl Edwards	Roush Racing	Ford	404	0	running	138	$93,850
10	23	41	Casey Mears	Chip Ganassi Racing	Dodge	404	0	running	134	$105,858
11	36	31	Jeff Burton	Richard Childress Racing	Chevrolet	404	0	running	130	$102,895
12	20	21	Ricky Rudd	Wood Brothers Racing	Ford	403	0	running	127	$101,764
13	18	16	Greg Biffle	Roush Racing	Ford	403	14	running	129	$87,875
14	26	25	Brian Vickers	Hendrick Motorsports	Chevrolet	403	0	running	121	$79,625
15	15	88	Dale Jarrett	Robert Yates Racing	Ford	403	0	running	118	$105,583
16	2	9	Kasey Kahne	Evernham Motorsports	Dodge	403	0	running	115	$113,200
17	9	01	Joe Nemechek	MB2 Motorsports	Chevrolet	403	0	running	112	$91,783
18	31	20	Tony Stewart	Joe Gibbs Racing	Chevrolet	402	0	running	109	$114,136
19	17	29	Kevin Harvick	Richard Childress Racing	Chevrolet	402	0	running	106	$112,561
20	24	07	Dave Blaney	Richard Childress Racing	Chevrolet	402	0	running	103	$79,025
21	13	77	Travis Kvapil (R)	Penske-Jasper Racing	Dodge	402	0	running	100	$76,725
22	38	4	Mike Wallace	Morgan–McClure Motorsports	Chevrolet	402	0	running	97	$68,475
23	10	97	Kurt Busch	Roush Racing	Ford	401	192	running	104	$133,500
24	29	10	Scott Riggs	MBV Motorsports	Chevrolet	401	0	running	91	$87,733
25	37	11	J. J. Yeley	Joe Gibbs Racing	Chevrolet	401	0	running	88	$68,200
26	27	15	Michael Waltrip	Dale Earnhardt, Inc.	Chevrolet	401	1	running	90	$94,764
27	21	43	Jeff Green	Petty Enterprises	Dodge	401	0	running	82	$96,336
28	42	49	Ken Schrader	BAM Racing	Dodge	401	0	running	79	$66,750
29	19	42	Jamie McMurray	Chip Ganassi Racing	Dodge	400	0	running	76	$72,100
30	30	0	Mike Bliss	Haas CNC Racing	Chevrolet	399	0	running	73	$64,450
31	4	8	Dale Earnhardt Jr.	Dale Earnhardt, Inc.	Chevrolet	397	0	running	70	$111,183
32	28	18	Bobby Labonte	Joe Gibbs Racing	Chevrolet	397	0	running	67	$98,175
33	8	32	Bobby Hamilton Jr.	PPI Motorsports	Chevrolet	386	0	running	64	$73,947
34	43	78	Kenny Wallace	Furniture Row Racing	Chevrolet	381	0	running	61	$63,275
35	11	17	Matt Kenseth	Roush Racing	Ford	367	0	crash	58	$110,986
36	16	22	Scott Wimmer	Bill Davis Racing	Dodge	293	0	crash	55	$70,900
37	25	24	Jeff Gordon	Hendrick Motorsports	Chevrolet	291	0	crash	52	$111,511
38	39	37	Tony Raines	R&J Racing	Dodge	288	0	crash	49	$62,650
39	33	7	Robby Gordon	Robby Gordon Motorsports	Chevrolet	280	0	engine	46	$62,525
40	35	66	Kevin Lepage	Peak Fitness Racing	Ford	197	0	crash	43	$62,350
41	14	40	Sterling Marlin	Chip Ganassi Racing	Dodge	190	0	engine	40	$90,068
42	41	00	Carl Long	McGlynn Racing	Chevrolet	144	0	engine	37	$62,035
43	40	95	Stanton Barrett (R)	Stanton Barrett Motorsports	Chevrolet	8	0	crash	34	$61,886
Failed to qualify
44		89	Morgan Shepherd	Shepherd Racing Ventures	Dodge					
45		92	Hermie Sadler	Front Row Motorsports	Chevrolet					
46		08	Ryan McGlynn	McGlynn Racing	Dodge					
47		34	Joey McCarthy	Mach 1 Motorsports	Chevrolet					
48		75	Wayne Anderson	Rinaldi Racing	Dodge					
Official race results

== Standings after the race ==
Drivers' Championship standings

	Pos	Driver	Points
5	1	Jimmie Johnson	5,362
2	2	Rusty Wallace	5,355 (-7)
	3	Ryan Newman	5,350 (-12)
3	4	Mark Martin	5,341 (–21)
4	5	Tony Stewart	5,539 (–23)
4	6	Greg Biffle	5,539 (–23)
1	7	Jeremy Mayfield	5,281 (–81)
1	8	Carl Edwards	5,259 (–103)
4	9	Matt Kenseth	5,228 (–124)
	10	Kurt Busch	5,192 (–170)
Official driver's standings

- Note: Only the first 10 positions are included for the driver standings.

Previous race: 2005 Sylvania 300	NASCAR Nextel Cup Series; 2005 season	Next race: 2005 UAW-Ford 500
