= McGlynn Racing =

Former American racing team

- Owner: Raynard McGlynn
- Base: Wilkes-Barre, Pennsylvania
- Series: Nextel Cup Series, Craftsman Truck Series
- Race drivers: Carl Long, Derrike Cope, Ryan McGlynn, Michael Waltrip
- Manufacturer: Chevrolet, Dodge
- Opened: 1998
- Closed: 2007

Career
- Drivers' Championships: 0
- Race victories: 0

McGlynn Racing was a NASCAR racing team. Owned by Raynard McGlynn, they fielded entries in the Nextel Cup Series and Craftsman Truck Series before closing down in July 2007.

McGlynn began racing in NASCAR in 1998 in the Craftsman Truck Series. Originally, the team made its debut at I-70 Speedway, but failed to qualify. It ran its first race at Nazareth Speedway with Ryan McGlynn driving. He started 35th in the No. 00 Buyer's Choice Chevrolet Silverado and moved up to 28th. He ran his only other race of the season at New Hampshire International Speedway. He finished 29th.

In 1999, McGlynn moved up to run for Rookie of the Year honors. He made a total of thirteen starts, his best finish a 24th at Nashville Speedway USA. He finished 28th in the final championship standings. In 2000, McGlynn made eighteen starts, the most in the team's history and had three top-twenty finishes. He also finished a career best 25th in the points standings.

McGlynn ran only three races in 2001 due to a lack of primary sponsorship. They posted a career-high 11th-place finish at Kentucky Speedway. They ran three races the following season as well, McGlynn's best finish a 22nd at New Hampshire. They also attempted their first Cup race with Ryan at Martinsville Speedway in the No. 80 car, but failed to qualify.

In 2003, Ryan ran his final set of Craftsman Truck races. He only finished one race that year at Loudon. In 2004, he attempted the O'Reilly 200, but failed to qualify. Ryan attempted several races during the 2004 Cup season but failed to qualify. McGlynn Racing made its first Cup start at Pocono Raceway with Carl Long, qualifying 38th and finishing 41st in the No. 00 Chevrolet Monte Carlo.

In 2005, McGlynn bought out Long's No. 46 team and combined it with the No. 00 operation, hiring Long to run a part-time schedule. Long made nine starts with the team, posting two thirty-second-place finishes. In addition to buying additional cars from Penske Racing and Bill Davis Racing, McGlynn began fielding a second car, the No. 08. Ryan failed to qualify at Dover International Speedway, but Derrike Cope qualified at Martinsville Speedway, finishing 33rd. Due to pressure from Royal Administration, Long was dropped from McGlynn with Cope taking over the No. 00 full-time. McGlynn failed to make a race for the balance of the season.

For the 2006, McGlynn switched to the No. 74 to avoid conflict with MBA Racing. They have run with sponsorship from Sundance Vacations, Royal Administration, MyGuardian911 and Vialafil. Cope ran a limited schedule, his best finish a 34th in nine starts. The team also sold their ride to Michael Waltrip at the Coca-Cola 600 after he failed to qualify. Long returned to McGlynn at the 2006 Ford 400, driving a second entry for McGlynn, but failed to qualify. The team did not qualify for the 2007 Daytona 500, and after being unable to garner additional sponsorship, the team folded.

== Cup Series ==
=== Car No. 74 (primary car) results ===
| Year | Driver | No. | Make | 1 | 2 | 3 | 4 | 5 | 6 | 7 | 8 | 9 | 10 | 11 | 12 | 13 | 14 | 15 | 16 | 17 | 18 | 19 | 20 | 21 | 22 | 23 | 24 | 25 | 26 | 27 | 28 | 29 | 30 | 31 | 32 | 33 | 34 | 35 | 36 | Owners | Pts |
|---|---|---|---|---|---|---|---|---|---|---|---|---|---|---|---|---|---|---|---|---|---|---|---|---|---|---|---|---|---|---|---|---|---|---|---|---|---|---|---|---|---|
| 2002 | Ryan McGlynn | 80 | Chevy | DAY | CAR | LVS | ATL | DAR | BRI | TEX | MAR | TAL | CAL | RCH | CLT | DOV | POC | MCH | SON | DAY | CHI | NHA | POC | IND | GLN | MCH | BRI | DAR | RCH | NHA | DOV | KAN | TAL | CLT | MAR; DNQ | ATL | CAR | PHO | HOM | 73rd | 22 |
| 2004 | Carl Long | 00 | Dodge | DAY | CAR | LVS | ATL | DAR | BRI | TEX | MAR | TAL | CAL | RCH | CLT | DOV | POC; 41 | MCH; DNQ | SON | DAY | CHI | NHA | POC | IND | GLN | MCH | | | | | | | | | | | | DAR; DNQ | HOM | 56th | 260 |
| 2004 | Ryan McGlynn | 08 | Chevy | | | | | | | | | | | | | | | | | | | | | | | | BRI; DNQ | CAL | | | | | | | | | | | | 56th | 260 |
| 2004 | Ryan McGlynn | 00 | Chevy | | | | | | | | | | | | | | | | | | | | | | | | | | RCH; DNQ | NHA; DNQ | | | | | MAR; DNQ | ATL | PHO; DNQ | | | 56th | 260 |
| 2004 | Carl Long | 00 | Chevy | | | | | | | | | | | | | | | | | | | | | | | | | | | | DOV; DNQ | TAL | KAN; DNQ | | | | | | | 56th | 260 |
| 2004 | Carl Long | 08 | Chevy | | | | | | | | | | | | | | | | | | | | | | | | | | | | | | | CLT; DNQ | | | | | | 56th | 260 |
| 2005 | Carl Long | 00 | Chevy | DAY | CAL | LVS; DNQ | ATL; DNQ | BRI; 42 | MAR; DNQ | TEX | PHO; 43 | TAL | | RCH; DNQ | CLT; DNQ | DOV; 42 | POC; DNQ | MCH | SON | DAY | | NHA; 43 | POC; DNQ | IND | GLN | | | | RCH; DNQ | | DOV; 42 | TAL | | | | | TEX; DNQ | | | 45th | 729 |
| 2005 | Carl Long | 80 | Chevy | | | | | | | | | | DAR; 42 | | | | | | | | | | | | | | BRI; 32 | CAL | | | | | | | | | | | | 45th | 729 |
| 2005 | Carl Long | 00 | Dodge | | | | | | | | | | | | | | | | | | CHI; 40 | | | | | | | | | NHA; DNQ | | | KAN; DNQ | | MAR; DNQ | ATL; 32 | | | | 45th | 729 |
| 2005 | Carl Long | 80 | Dodge | | | | | | | | | | | | | | | | | | | | | | | MCH; DNQ | | | | | | | | CLT; DNQ | | | | | | 45th | 729 |
| 2005 | Derrike Cope | 00 | Dodge | | | | | | | | | | | | | | | | | | | | | | | | | | | | | | | | | | | PHO; DNQ | HOM; DNQ | 45th | 729 |
| 2006 | Derrike Cope | 74 | Dodge | DAY; DNQ | CAL; DNQ | LVS | ATL; DNQ | BRI; DNQ | MAR; DNQ | TEX; 41 | PHO | TAL | RCH; 43 | DAR; 43 | CLT; QL^{†} | DOV; 37 | POC; DNQ | MCH; 43 | SON | DAY | CHI; DNQ | NHA; DNQ | POC; DNQ | IND | GLN | MCH; 34 | BRI; 43 | CAL | RCH; DNQ | NHA; DNQ | DOV; 43 | KAN | TAL; 43 | CLT; DNQ | MAR; DNQ | ATL; DNQ | TEX; DNQ | PHO; DNQ | HOM; DNQ | 45th | 679 |
| 2006 | Michael Waltrip | 55 | Dodge | | | | | | | | | | | | CLT; 41 | | | | | | | | | | | | | | | | | | | | | | | | | 45th | 679 |
| 2007 | Derrike Cope | 74 | Dodge | DAY; DNQ | CAL | LVS | ATL | BRI | MAR | TEX | PHO | TAL | RCH | DAR | CLT | DOV | POC | MCH | SON | NHA | DAY | CHI | IND | POC | GLN | MCH | BRI | CAL | RCH | NHA | DOV | KAN | TAL | CLT | MAR | ATL | TEX | PHO | HOM | 65th | 16 |
^{†} - Qualified but ride bought by Michael Waltrip

=== Car No. 08 (secondary car) results ===
| Year | Driver | No. | Make | 1 | 2 | 3 | 4 | 5 | 6 | 7 | 8 | 9 | 10 | 11 | 12 | 13 | 14 | 15 | 16 | 17 | 18 | 19 | 20 | 21 | 22 | 23 | 24 | 25 | 26 | 27 | 28 | 29 | 30 | 31 | 32 | 33 | 34 | 35 | 36 | Owners | Pts |
|---|---|---|---|---|---|---|---|---|---|---|---|---|---|---|---|---|---|---|---|---|---|---|---|---|---|---|---|---|---|---|---|---|---|---|---|---|---|---|---|---|---|
| 2005 | Ryan McGlynn | 08 | Dodge | DAY | CAL | LVS | ATL | BRI | MAR | TEX | PHO | TAL | DAR | RCH | CLT | DOV | POC | MCH | SON | DAY | CHI | NHA | POC | IND | GLN | MCH | BRI | CAL | RCH | NHA | DOV; DNQ | TAL | KAN | CLT | | | | | | 70th | 64 |
| 2005 | Derrike Cope | 08 | Chevy | | | | | | | | | | | | | | | | | | | | | | | | | | | | | | | | MAR; 33 | ATL | TEX | PHO | HOM | 70th | 64 |
