= Arnold Motorsports =

Former NASCAR team

- Owner: Don Arnold
- Base: Concord, North Carolina
- Series: Nextel Cup Series
- Manufacturer: Dodge
- Opened: 2003
- Closed: 2006

Career
- Drivers' Championships: 0
- Race victories: 0

Arnold Motorsports was a NASCAR Nextel Cup Series team operated by Don Arnold, owner of Arnold Development Companies and Arnold & Arnold Real Estate. 1983 Winston Cup champion Bobby Allison was the Vice President of operations and also served as a consultant. From 2004 to 2005, the team formed a partnership with then-Craftsman Truck Series team Germain Racing as Germain-Arnold Racing, although Germain fielded Toyota Tundras in the Truck Series while the Cup Series team fielded Dodges.

== History ==
Arnold Motorsports was formed in 2003 after the purchase of the race shop and equipment of Melling Racing. The team debuted as the No.79 Arnold Development Companies Dodge, with Pro Cup Series driver Billy Bigley Jr. driving. The team originally planned to run 34 races, but eventually scaled back its plans. After Bigley failed to qualify for the three events he attempted, he was released. Derrike Cope attempted the season finale at Homestead, but also failed to qualify.

The team returned full-time in 2004 with Derrike Cope at the wheel. Cope co-owned the team and merged his Quest Motor Racing team with Arnold's. The team briefly received sponsorship from Redneckjunk.com (unrelated to a RacingJunk.com that sponsored Carl Long during this same time frame), but was forced to remove its decals by NASCAR because the sanctioning body didn't believe it "projected the proper image of [the] sport." After twelve starts, Cope was replaced by Mike Wallace at Dover. Wallace, along with P. J. Jones, Jeff Fuller and Todd Bodine, finished out the year.

In 2005 Jimmy Spencer drove the car in what was a limited schedule due to lack of sponsorship. The team announced Allied Buildings as the sponsor for the rest of 2005 and all of 2006 at the Brickyard 400 at Indianapolis Motor Speedway. Arnold also owned a share of a Craftsman Truck Series team with Germain Motor Company as the No.30 Toyota. But Arnold sold the interest in that team to focus on Cup. The team's only attempt in 2006 came at the Daytona 500 with Larry Foyt as driver, but the team missed the race. In May 2006, the team announced it was shutting down. The shop later housed Spraker Racing in the ARCA Re/MAX Series. Team founder Don Arnold died in December 2015.

== In other media ==
The team's 50 car is featured in the video game NASCAR 2005: Chase for the Cup driven by Cope, and in NASCAR 06: Total Team Control driven by Jimmy Spencer. Germain Racing's truck series cars in the latter game were listed under Arnold Motorsports.

== Motorsports career results ==
=== NASCAR ===
(key) (Bold – Pole position awarded by qualifying time. Italics – Pole position earned by points standings or practice time. * – Most laps led.)

==== Car No. 50 results ====
NASCAR Nextel Cup Series results
Year	Driver	No.	Make	1	2	3	4	5	6	7	8	9	10	11	12	13	14	15	16	17	18	19	20	21	22	23	24	25	26	27	28	29	30	31	32	33	34	35	36	Owners	Pts
2003	Billy Bigley	79	Dodge	DAY	CAR	LVS	ATL	DAR	BRI	TEX	TAL	MAR	CAL	RCH	CLT	DOV	POC	MCH	SON	DAY	CHI	NHA	POC	IND; DNQ	GLN	MCH	BRI; DNQ	DAR	RCH; DNQ	NHA	DOV; DNQ	TAL	KAN	CLT	MAR	ATL; DNQ	PHO	CAR		58th	147
2003	Derrike Cope	79	Dodge																																				HOM; DNQ	58th	147
2004	Derrike Cope	50	Dodge	DAY; 30	CAR; 30	LVS; 33	ATL; 38	DAR; 25	BRI; 26	TEX; 37	MAR; 33	TAL; 38	CAL; 31	RCH; 29	CLT; 34																									37th	1958
2004	Mike Wallace	50	Dodge													DOV; 35				DAY; 41		NHA; 32																		37th	1958
2004	P. J. Jones	50	Dodge														POC; 22	MCH; 25	SON; 39		CHI; 39		POC; 43																	37th	1958
2004	Todd Bodine	50	Dodge																					IND; 41	GLN; 41	MCH; 43	BRI; 23		RCH; 43	NHA; 23			KAN; 39		MAR; 43	ATL; 39	PHO; 43	DAR; 39	HOM; DNQ	37th	1958
2004	Jeff Fuller	50	Dodge																									CAL; 43			DOV; 43	TAL		CLT; 42						37th	1958
2005	Jimmy Spencer	50	Dodge	DAY	CAL	LVS	ATL; 29	BRI; 21	MAR	TEX	PHO	TAL	DAR	RCH	CLT; 42	DOV	POC	MCH	SON	DAY	CHI	NHA	POC	IND; DNQ			BRI; 28	CAL	RCH; 36	NHA; 39	DOV	TAL	KAN	CLT; DNQ	MAR	ATL; DNQ	TEX; 39	PHO; 36	HOM; 31	47th	674
2005	Jorge Goeters	50	Dodge																						GLN; 35	MCH														47th	674
2006	Larry Foyt	50	Dodge	DAY; DNQ	CAL	LVS	ATL	BRI	MAR	TEX	PHO	TAL	RCH	DAR	CLT	DOV	POC	MCH	SON	DAY	CHI	NHA	POC	IND	GLN	MCH	BRI	CAL	RCH	NHA	DOV	KAN	TAL	CLT	MAR	ATL	TEX	PHO	HOM	74th	10

== See also ==
- Germain Racing
