= Ryan McGlynn =

American racing driver (born 1974)

- Born: November 22, 1974 (age 51); Shickshinny, Pennsylvania, U.S.

NASCAR FedEx Freight Truck Series career
- 2003 position: 60th
- Best finish: 25th (2000)
- First race: 1998 NAPA Autocare 200 (Nazareth)
- Last race: 2003 John Boy & Billy 250 (South Boston)
Wins	Top tens	Poles
0	0	0
- Statistics up to date as of February 21, 2007.

Ryan McGlynn (born November 22, 1974) is an American former stock car racing driver and was the co-owner of McGlynn Racing along with his father Raynard "Ray" McGlynn. Together, they managed the No. 74 Nextel Cup Series team with drivers Derrike Cope and himself. The team closed in 2007.

McGlynn is also a NASCAR driver, with experience in the Craftsman Truck Series as well as some scattered attempts at the Nextel Cup Series.

In 2000, McGlynn was in a crash at Evergreen Speedway, where he hit the tire barrier in the second turn, which resulted in his truck rolling over.

== Motorsports career results ==
=== NASCAR ===
(key) (Bold – Pole position awarded by qualifying time. Italics – Pole position earned by points standings or practice time. * – Most laps led.)

==== Nextel Cup Series ====
NASCAR Nextel Cup Series results
Year	Team	No.	Make	1	2	3	4	5	6	7	8	9	10	11	12	13	14	15	16	17	18	19	20	21	22	23	24	25	26	27	28	29	30	31	32	33	34	35	36	NNCC	Pts	Ref
2002	McGlynn Racing	80	Chevy	DAY	CAR	LVS	ATL	DAR	BRI	TEX	MAR	TAL	CAL	RCH	CLT	DOV	POC	MCH	SON	DAY	CHI	NHA	POC	IND	GLN	MCH	BRI	DAR	RCH	NHA	DOV	KAN	TAL	CLT	MAR; DNQ	ATL	CAR	PHO	HOM	NA	-	
2004	McGlynn Racing	00	Chevy	DAY	CAR	LVS	ATL	DAR	BRI	TEX	MAR	TAL	CAL	RCH	CLT	DOV	POC	MCH	SON	DAY	CHI	NHA; DNQ	POC	IND	GLN	MCH			RCH; DNQ	NHA; DNQ	DOV	TAL	KAN	CLT	MAR; DNQ	ATL	PHO; DNQ	DAR	HOM	NA	-	
2004	McGlynn Racing	08	Chevy																								BRI; DNQ	CAL												NA	-	
2005	McGlynn Racing	08	Dodge	DAY	CAL	LVS	ATL	BRI	MAR	TEX	PHO	TAL	DAR	RCH	CLT	DOV	POC	MCH	SON	DAY	CHI	NHA	POC	IND	GLN	MCH	BRI	CAL	RCH	NHA	DOV; DNQ	TAL	KAN	CLT	MAR	ATL	TEX	PHO	HOM	NA	-	

==== Craftsman Truck Series ====
NASCAR Craftsman Truck Series results
Year	Team	No.	Make	1	2	3	4	5	6	7	8	9	10	11	12	13	14	15	16	17	18	19	20	21	22	23	24	25	26	27	NCTC	Pts	Ref
1998	McGlynn Racing	00	Chevy	WDW	HOM	PHO	POR	EVG	I70; DNQ	GLN; DNQ	TEX	BRI; DNQ	MLW	NZH; 28	CAL	PPR	IRP	NHA; 29	FLM; DNQ	NSV; DNQ	HPT	LVL	RCH	MEM; DNQ	GTY	MAR; DNQ	SON	MMR	PHO	LVS	44th	471	
1999	McGlynn Racing	00	Chevy	HOM	PHO; 32	EVG; 28	MMR; 27	MAR; DNQ	MEM; 29	PPR; 34	I70; 25	BRI; 31	TEX; 35	PIR	GLN; 27	MLW	NSV; 24	NZH; 27	MCH; 32	NHA; 26	IRP	GTY	HPT	RCH	LVS	LVL; DNQ	TEX	CAL			29th	1089	
2000	McGlynn Racing	00	Chevy	DAY; 16	HOM; 24	PHO; 34	MMR; 26	MAR; 29	PIR; 33	GTY; 31	MEM; 33	PPR; 23	EVG; 28	TEX; 34	KEN; 30	GLN; 34		NHA; 18	NZH; 17	MCH; 21	IRP; DNQ	NSV; DNQ	CIC; 34	RCH	DOV; DNQ	TEX	CAL				25th	1581	
2000	Raptor Performance Motorsports	9	Ford														MLW; 32														25th	1581	
2001	McGlynn Racing	00	Chevy	DAY; DNQ	HOM	MMR	MAR; 35	GTY	DAR	PPR	DOV	TEX	MEM	MLW	KAN	KEN; 11	NHA	IRP	NSH	CIC	NZH; 27	RCH	SBO	TEX	LVS	PHO	CAL				58th	307	
2002	McGlynn Racing	00	Chevy	DAY; DNQ	DAR; 24	MAR	GTY	PPR	DOV	TEX	MEM	MLW	KAN	KEN	NHA; 22	MCH	IRP	NSH	RCH	TEX	SBO; 32	LVS	CAL	PHO	HOM						60th	255	
2003	McGlynn Racing	00	Chevy	DAY	DAR	MMR	MAR; 29	CLT	DOV	TEX	MEM	MLW	KAN	KEN; 35	GTW	MCH; 31	IRP	NSH	BRI	RCH	NHA; 22	CAL	LVS	SBO; 33	TEX	MAR	PHO	HOM			60th	365	
2004	McGlynn Racing	00	Chevy	DAY	ATL	MAR	MFD	CLT	DOV	TEX	MEM	MLW	KAN	KEN	GTW	MCH	IRP	NSH	BRI; DNQ	RCH	NHA	LVS	CAL	TEX	MAR	PHO	DAR	HOM			NA	-	
