= Howes Lubricator =

- Company type: Public
- Founded: 1920
- Headquarters: North Kingstown, Rhode Island
- Products: Automotive
- Website: www.howeslube.com www.howeslube.eu

Howes Lubricator is a manufacturer of oils, fuel additives and multi purpose lubricant. It was established in 1920 by Wendell V.C. Howes.
