= 2004 Mountain Dew Southern 500 =

Race details
- Race 35 of 36 in the 2004 NASCAR Nextel Cup Series
- 2004 Southern 500 program cover
- Date: November 14, 2004
- Official name: Mountain Dew Southern 500
- Location: Darlington Raceway, Darlington County, South Carolina
- Course: Permanent racing facility
- Course length: 1.366 miles (2.198 km)
- Distance: 367 laps, 501.322 mi (806.800 km)
- Weather: Temperatures hovering around 44.8 °F (7.1 °C); wind speeds up to 13.8 miles per hour (22.2 km/h)
- Average speed: 125.044 miles per hour (201.239 km/h)
- Attendance: 70,000

Pole position
| Driver | Kurt Busch | Roush Racing |

Most laps led
| Driver | Jeff Gordon | Hendrick Motorsports |
- Laps: 155

Winner
| No. 48 | Jimmie Johnson | Hendrick Motorsports |

Television in the United States
- Network: NBC
- Announcers: Allen Bestwick, Benny Parsons and Wally Dallenbach Jr.

The 2004 Mountain Dew Southern 500, the 55th running of the event was a NASCAR Nextel Cup Series race held on November 14, 2004, at Darlington Raceway in Darlington, South Carolina. Contested over 367 laps at the 1.366-mile (2.198-kilometre) speedway, it was the 35th race of the 2004 NASCAR Nextel Cup Series season.

For the 2004 season, a shuffling of the NASCAR schedule saw the race move to November. Track management believed the November date would allow for cooler, more comfortable weather for fans, who had increasingly voiced concerns about the hot, humid, weather. In addition, it meant the race would be part of the new Chase for the Nextel Cup playoff date. Rockingham lost its fall date to Fontana, and the Pop Secret 500 was moved to the prestigious Labor Day weekend date. The track also installed lights.

Qualifying was canceled due to rain and the starting lineup was set by owner's points. Kurt Busch was the points leader and sat on the front row. Jimmie Johnson of Hendrick Motorsports won the race.

== Background ==
Layout of Darlington Raceway, the track where the race was held

Darlington Raceway, nicknamed by many NASCAR fans and drivers as "The Lady in Black" or "The Track Too Tough to Tame" and advertised as a "NASCAR Tradition", is a race track built for NASCAR racing located near Darlington, South Carolina. It is of a unique, somewhat egg-shaped design, an oval with the ends of very different configurations, a condition which supposedly arose from the proximity of one end of the track to a minnow pond the owner refused to relocate. This situation makes it very challenging for the crews to set up their cars' handling in a way that will be effective at both ends.

The track, Darlington Raceway, is a four-turn, 1.366-mile (2.198-kilometre) oval. The track's first two turns are banked at twenty-five degrees, while the final two turns are banked two degrees lower at twenty-three degrees. The front stretch (the location of the finish line) and the back stretch is banked at six degrees. Darlington Raceway can seat up to 60,000 people.

== Top 10 results ==
| Pos | Grid | No. | Driver | Team | Manufacturer | Sponsor | Laps | Laps Led | Points |
|---|---|---|---|---|---|---|---|---|---|
| 1 | 4 | 48 | Jimmie Johnson | Hendrick Motorsports | Chevrolet | Lowe's | 367 | 124 | 185 |
| 2 | 5 | 6 | Mark Martin | Roush Racing | Ford | Viagra | 367 | 36 | 175 |
| 3 | 2 | 24 | Jeff Gordon | Hendrick Motorsports | Chevrolet | DuPont | 367 | 155 | 175 |
| 4 | 11 | 42 | Jamie McMurray | Chip Ganassi Racing | Dodge | Texaco / Havoline | 367 | 15 | 165 |
| 5 | 13 | 9 | Kasey Kahne | Evernham Motorsports | Dodge | Dodge Dealers / UAW | 367 | 0 | 155 |
| 6 | 1 | 97 | Kurt Busch | Roush Racing | Ford | Smirnoff Ice / Sharpie | 367 | 9 | 155 |
| 7 | 24 | 99 | Carl Edwards | Roush Racing | Ford | World Financial Group | 367 | 0 | 146 |
| 8 | 18 | 01 | Joe Nemechek | MBV Motorsports | Chevrolet | USG Sheetrock | 367 | 1 | 147 |
| 9 | 15 | 18 | Bobby Labonte | Joe Gibbs Racing | Chevrolet | Interstate Batteries | 367 | 0 | 138 |
| 10 | 30 | 0 | Mike Bliss | Haas CNC Racing | Chevrolet | NetZero | 367 | 0 | 134 |

== Race statistics ==
- Time of race: 4:00:33
- Average speed: 125.044 miles per hour (201.239 km/h)
- Pole speed: no time trials
- Cautions: 8 for 47 laps
- Margin of victory: 0.959 seconds
- Lead changes: 27 among 10 drivers
- Percent of race run under caution: 12.8%
- Average green flag run: 35.6 laps
