= 2004 Subway 400 =

Race details
- Race 2 of 36 in the 2004 NASCAR Nextel Cup Series
- 2004 Subway 400 program cover
- Date: February 22, 2004
- Location: North Carolina Speedway, Richmond County, North Carolina
- Course: Permanent racing facility
- Course length: 1.017 miles (1.637 km)
- Distance: 393 laps, 399.681 mi (643.224 km)
- Weather: Temperatures hovering around 71.1 °F (21.7 °C); wind speeds up to 9.2 miles per hour (14.8 km/h)
- Average speed: 112.016 mph (180.272 km/h)

Pole position
| Driver | Ryan Newman | Penske Racing |
- Time: 23.398

Most laps led
| Driver | Matt Kenseth | Roush Racing |
- Laps: 259

Winner
| No. 17 | Matt Kenseth | Roush Racing |

Television in the United States
- Network: Fox
- Announcers: Mike Joy, Darrell Waltrip, Larry McReynolds

The 2004 Subway 400 was a NASCAR Nextel Cup Series race held on February 22, 2004, at North Carolina Speedway in Rockingham, North Carolina. The race was the second of the 2004 NASCAR Nextel Cup Series season.

Ryan Newman of Penske Racing won the pole position, while Matt Kenseth of Roush Racing won the race. The race was the final Cup race at the track due to poor attendance, as the race date was later given to Phoenix International Raceway; only 50,000 were in attendance at the 60,113 facility.

== Entry list ==
| Car # | Driver | Make | Team |
|---|---|---|---|
| 0 | Ward Burton | Chevrolet | Gene Haas |
| 01 | Joe Nemechek | Chevrolet | Nelson Bowers |
| 1 | John Andretti | Chevrolet | Dale Earnhardt, Inc. |
| 2 | Rusty Wallace | Dodge | Roger Penske |
| 4 | Kevin Lepage | Chevrolet | Larry McClure |
| 5 | Terry Labonte | Chevrolet | Rick Hendrick |
| 6 | Mark Martin | Ford | Jack Roush |
| 8 | Dale Earnhardt Jr | Chevrolet | Dale Earnhardt, Inc. |
| 09 | Joe Ruttman | Dodge | James Finch |
| 9 | Kasey Kahne | Dodge | Ray Evernham |
| 10 | Scott Riggs | Chevrolet | James Rocco |
| 12 | Ryan Newman | Dodge | Roger Penske |
| 14 | Larry Foyt | Dodge | A.J. Foyt |
| 15 | Michael Waltrip | Chevrolet | Dale Earnhardt, Inc. |
| 16 | Greg Biffle | Ford | Jack Roush |
| 17 | Matt Kenseth | Ford | Jack Roush |
| 18 | Bobby Labonte | Chevrolet | Joe Gibbs |
| 19 | Jeremy Mayfield | Dodge | Ray Evernham |
| 20 | Tony Stewart | Chevrolet | Joe Gibbs |
| 21 | Ricky Rudd | Ford | Wood Brothers |
| 22 | Scott Wimmer | Dodge | Bill Davis |
| 24 | Jeff Gordon | Chevrolet | Rick Hendrick |
| 25 | Brian Vickers | Chevrolet | Rick Hendrick |
| 29 | Kevin Harvick | Chevrolet | Richard Childress |
| 30 | Johnny Sauter | Chevrolet | Richard Childress |
| 31 | Robby Gordon | Chevrolet | Richard Childress |
| 32 | Ricky Craven | Chevrolet | Cal Wells |
| 38 | Elliott Sadler | Ford | Yates Racing |
| 40 | Sterling Marlin | Dodge | Chip Ganassi |
| 41 | Casey Mears | Dodge | Chip Ganassi |
| 42 | Jamie McMurray | Dodge | Chip Ganassi |
| 43 | Jeff Green | Dodge | Petty Enterprises |
| 45 | Kyle Petty | Dodge | Petty Enterprises |
| 46 | Carl Long | Dodge | Rick Glenn |
| 48 | Jimmie Johnson | Chevrolet | Rick Hendrick |
| 49 | Ken Schrader | Dodge | Beth Ann Morgenthau |
| 50 | Derrike Cope | Dodge | Don Arnold |
| 72 | Kirk Shelmerdine | Ford | Kirk Shelmerdine |
| 77 | Brendan Gaughan | Dodge | Doug Bawel |
| 80 | Andy Hillenburg | Ford | Stan Hover |
| 88 | Dale Jarrett | Ford | Yates Racing |
| 97 | Kurt Busch | Ford | Jack Roush |
| 99 | Jeff Burton | Ford | Jack Roush |

== Qualifying ==
Ryan Newman, 2003's pole leader with 11, won the pole at Rockingham with a lap speed of 156.475 miles per hour (251.822 km/h) and a lap time of 23.398 seconds. Dodges were the top four fastest, with Newman, Jamie McMurray (155.379 mph (250.058 km/h)), Kasey Kahne (154.814 mph (249.149 km/h)) and Rusty Wallace (154.644 mph (248.875 km/h)). Chevrolet driver Jeff Gordon qualified fifth with a lap speed of 154.318 mph (248.351 km/h); Jeremy Mayfield (154.195 mph (248.153 km/h)), Dale Earnhardt Jr. (154.149 mph (248.079 km/h)), Jeff Green (154.117 mph (248.027 km/h)), the previous year's race winner Dale Jarrett (154.078 mph (247.965 km/h)) and Greg Biffle (154.026 mph (247.881 km/h)) rounded out the top ten. Morgan Shepherd and Andy Belmont failed to qualify after the two crashed in practice. Ryan McGlynn and Larry Gunselman also withdrew.

The entry list for the race was short, which led to a group of field-fillers entering the race, including Joe Ruttman, starting in his first Cup race since 1995, Kirk Shelmerdine, who made only two Cup Series starts since 1994, Carl Long, who started twice in 2001, and Andy Hillenburg, who failed to qualify for the 2004 Daytona 500. The four drivers were considerably slower than the 37 full-time teams; in comparison to Newman's qualifying speed, Hillenburg, who started 43rd, had a speed of 146.859 mph (236.347 km/h), a 9.616 mph (15.475 km/h) differential. Hillenburg, who ran just six laps in the two practice sessions prior to the race, expressed interest in running the full race, stating, "I don't want to look like we're trying to capitalize on anything, but this is our window of opportunity. We're not here to go two laps and try to get a check. We're here to do the best we can." After the race, rumors arose whether NASCAR had requested the field-fillers to appear and complete the 43-car field with the reward of money, possibly to satisfy television contracts, NASCAR vice president Jim Hunter denied the allegations.

=== Qualifying results ===
1.Ryan Newman No.12 ALLTEL Dodge Penske Racing 156.475 mph

2.Jamie McMurray No.42 Texaco Havoline Dodge Chip Ganassi Racing 155.379 mph

3.Kasey Kahne* No.9 Dodge Dealers/UAW Dodge Evernham Motorsports 154.814 mph

4.Rusty Wallace No.2 Miller Lite Dodge Penske Racing 154.644 mph

5.Jeff Gordon No.24 Dupont Chevrolet Hendrick Motorsports 154.318 mph

6.Jeremy Mayfield No.19 Dodge Dealers/UAW Dodge Evernham Motorsports 154.195 mph

7.Dale Earnhardt Jr. No.8 Budweiser Chevrolet Dale Earnhardt Incorporated 154.149 mph

8.Jeff Green No.43 STP/Cheerios Dodge Petty Enterprises 154.117 mph

9.Dale Jarrett No.88 UPS Ford Robert Yates Racing 154.078 mph

10.Greg Biffle No.16 Subway/National Guard Ford Roush Racing 154.026 mph

11.Bobby Labonte No.18 Interstate Batteries Chevrolet Joe Gibbs Racing 154.020 mph

12.Joe Nemechek No.01 US Army Chevrolet MB2 Motorsports 153.987 mph

13.Casey Mears No.41 Target Dodge Chip Ganassi Racing 153.942 mph

14.Sterling Marlin No.40 Coors Light Dodge Chip Ganassi Racing 153.942 mph

15.Brendan Gaughan* No.77 Kodak/Jasper Engines Dodge Penske/Jasper Racing 153.748 mph

16.Ward Burton No. 0 Netzero HiSpeed Chevrolet Haas CNC Racing 153,690 mph

17. Ricky Craven No.32 Tide Chevrolet PPI Motorsports 153.619 mph

18.Ken Schrader No.49 Schwan's Home Service Dodge BAM Racing 153.413 mph

19.Scott Riggs* No.10 Valvoline Chevrolet MBV Motorsports 153.297 mph

20.Brian Vickers* No.25 GMAC Financial Services Chevrolet Hendrick Motorsports 153.169 mph

21.Mark Martin No. 6 Viagra Ford Roush Racing 153.015 mph

22.Ricky Rudd No.21 Motorcraft Ford Wood Brothers Racing 152.984 mph

23.Matt Kenseth No.17 DeWalt Ford Roush Racing 152.945 mph

24.Tony Stewart No.20 Home Depot Chevrolet Joe Gibbs Racing 152.875 mph

25.Elliott Sadler No.38 M&M's Ford Robert Yates Racing 152.798 mph

26.Kevin Lepage No.4 YokeTV.com Chevrolet Morgan-McClure Racing 152.792 mph

27.Kurt Busch No.97 Sharpie Ford Roush Racing 152.633 mph

28.Jeff Burton No.99 SKF Ford Roush Racing 152.486 mph

29.Jimmie Johnson No.48 Lowe's Chevrolet Hendrick Motorsports 152.480 mph

30.Kyle Petty No.45 Georgia Pacific Dodge Petty Enterprises 152.353 mph

31.Scott Wimmer* No.22 Caterpillar Dodge Bill Davis Racing 152.290 mph

32.Kevin Harvick No.29 GM Goodwrench Chevrolet Richard Childress Racing 152.220 mph

33.Michael Waltrip No.15 NAPA Auto Parts Chevrolet Dale Earnhardt Incorporated 152.119 mph

34.Robby Gordon No.31 Cingular Wireless Chevrolet Richard Childress Racing 152.024 mph

35.Terry Labonte No.5 Kellogg's ChevroletHendrick Motorsports 151.722 mph

36.Johnny Sauter* No. 30 America Online Chevrolet Richard Childress Racing 151.283 mph

37.Derrike Cope No.50 Arnold Development Companies Dodge Derrike Cope 151.283 mph

38.Larry Foyt No.14 AJ Foyt Racing Dodge AJ Foyt Racing 151.221 mph

39.John Andretti No.1 Snap-On/Nilla Chevrolet Dale Earnhardt Incorporated 150.481 mph (provisional)

40.Joe Ruttman No.09 Phoenix Racing Dodge Phoenix Racing 145.142 mph (provisional)

41.Kirk Shelmerdine No.172 Tucson Ford Kirk Shelmerdine 145.661 mph

42.Carl Long No.146 Glenn Underwater Services Dodge Glenn Racing 148.739 mph

43.Andy Hillenburg No.280 Commercial Truck & Trailer Ford Stanton Hover 146.859 mph

* Rookie of the Year contender.

== Race ==
After one lap was completed, Joe Ruttman, who started 40th and did not make any attempts to practice, was ordered to park by NASCAR for not having a pit crew and collected $54,196. NASCAR eventually admonished Phoenix Racing owner James Finch for the incident. Kirk Shelmerdine was lapped after eight minutes and finished 42nd after not reaching the minimum speeds mandated by NASCAR, and was paid $54,895. Carl Long finished 38th after barrel-rolling on the backstretch. Andy Hillenburg managed to finish the race in 34th and 17 laps down, earning $55,425.

Pole-sitter Ryan Newman led the first two laps before getting passed by Jamie McMurray, who led until the first caution flag was waved for Ken Schrader's crash in turns one and two. Jeff Gordon took the lead, leading until lap 53 when Kyle Petty crashed. McMurray and Robby Gordon exchanged the lead during the caution period, while Newman, Jeff Gordon, and Matt Kenseth swapped the lead changes during the 71-lap green flag period, with Schrader and Jimmie Johnson's accident on lap 131 bringing out another caution. On lap 134, Kenseth claimed the lead and led for 79 consecutive laps until lap 214, when a debris caution came out. Despite Kevin Harvick briefly taking first, Kenseth regained the lead and led for 87 more laps. During those laps, on lap 265, Long collided with Joe Nemechek, flipped down the backstretch, and landed in the turn 3 apron. With 42 laps left, Robby Gordon crashed, and McMurray eventually passed Kenseth and Kasey Kahne, but NASCAR ruled that Kenseth and Kahne were finishing their pit stops and were leaving pit road, and as the field was frozen, McMurray's pass was voided. Kenseth battled Kahne for the win, and on the final lap, defeated Kahne by .01 seconds, while McMurray finished third. McMurray's team owner Chip Ganassi confronted the NASCAR haulers about Kenseth and Kahne's wave around; Ganassi stated, "We just got robbed in front of 100,000 people."

== Race results ==
| Pos | St | No. | Driver | Car | Laps | Money | Status | Led | Points |
|---|---|---|---|---|---|---|---|---|---|
| 1 | 23 | 17 | Matt Kenseth | Ford | 393 | 222303 | running | 259 | 190 |
| 2 | 3 | 9 | Kasey Kahne | Dodge | 393 | 130125 | running | 0 | 170 |
| 3 | 2 | 42 | Jamie McMurray | Dodge | 393 | 96425 | running | 76 | 170 |
| 4 | 13 | 40 | Sterling Marlin | Dodge | 393 | 114900 | running | 0 | 160 |
| 5 | 7 | 8 | Dale Earnhardt, Jr. | Chevrolet | 393 | 118303 | running | 0 | 155 |
| 6 | 1 | 12 | Ryan Newman | Dodge | 393 | 116152 | running | 12 | 155 |
| 7 | 4 | 2 | Rusty Wallace | Dodge | 393 | 100643 | running | 0 | 146 |
| 8 | 27 | 97 | Kurt Busch | Ford | 393 | 83785 | running | 0 | 142 |
| 9 | 16 | 0 | Ward Burton | Chevrolet | 393 | 66035 | running | 0 | 138 |
| 10 | 5 | 24 | Jeff Gordon | Chevrolet | 391 | 111363 | running | 39 | 139 |
| 11 | 6 | 19 | Jeremy Mayfield | Dodge | 391 | 90210 | running | 0 | 130 |
| 12 | 21 | 6 | Mark Martin | Ford | 391 | 72960 | running | 0 | 127 |
| 13 | 32 | 29 | Kevin Harvick | Chevrolet | 391 | 100763 | running | 2 | 129 |
| 14 | 36 | 30 | Johnny Sauter | Chevrolet | 391 | 63560 | running | 0 | 121 |
| 15 | 31 | 22 | Scott Wimmer | Dodge | 391 | 87560 | running | 0 | 118 |
| 16 | 20 | 25 | Brian Vickers | Chevrolet | 391 | 70760 | running | 0 | 115 |
| 17 | 35 | 5 | Terry Labonte | Chevrolet | 391 | 89110 | running | 0 | 112 |
| 18 | 25 | 38 | Elliott Sadler | Ford | 391 | 90793 | running | 0 | 109 |
| 19 | 22 | 21 | Ricky Rudd | Ford | 391 | 87566 | running | 0 | 106 |
| 20 | 15 | 77 | Brendan Gaughan | Dodge | 391 | 70110 | running | 0 | 103 |
| 21 | 14 | 41 | Casey Mears | Dodge | 390 | 74810 | running | 0 | 100 |
| 22 | 26 | 4 | Kevin Lepage | Chevrolet | 390 | 71010 | running | 0 | 97 |
| 23 | 10 | 16 | Greg Biffle | Ford | 390 | 69185 | running | 0 | 94 |
| 24 | 12 | 01 | Joe Nemechek | Chevrolet | 390 | 75949 | running | 0 | 91 |
| 25 | 11 | 18 | Bobby Labonte | Chevrolet | 389 | 102318 | running | 0 | 88 |
| 26 | 24 | 20 | Tony Stewart | Chevrolet | 389 | 103403 | running | 0 | 85 |
| 27 | 18 | 49 | Ken Schrader | Dodge | 389 | 56410 | running | 0 | 82 |
| 28 | 8 | 43 | Jeff Green | Dodge | 389 | 82510 | running | 0 | 79 |
| 29 | 39 | 1 | John Andretti | Chevrolet | 388 | 64000 | running | 0 | 76 |
| 30 | 37 | 50 | Derrike Cope | Dodge | 386 | 56375 | running | 0 | 73 |
| 31 | 19 | 10 | Scott Riggs | Chevrolet | 383 | 80937 | running | 0 | 70 |
| 32 | 38 | 14 | Larry Foyt | Dodge | 380 | 55675 | running | 0 | 67 |
| 33 | 33 | 15 | Michael Waltrip | Chevrolet | 379 | 92481 | running | 0 | 64 |
| 34 | 43 | 80 | Andy Hillenburg | Ford | 376 | 55425 | running | 0 | 61 |
| 35 | 17 | 32 | Ricky Craven | Chevrolet | 365 | 63275 | running | 0 | 58 |
| 36 | 34 | 31 | Robby Gordon | Chevrolet | 350 | 90412 | crash | 5 | 60 |
| 37 | 28 | 99 | Jeff Burton | Ford | 344 | 88592 | engine | 0 | 52 |
| 38 | 42 | 46 | Carl Long | Dodge | 255 | 55135 | crash | 0 | 49 |
| 39 | 30 | 45 | Kyle Petty | Dodge | 221 | 55070 | engine | 0 | 46 |
| 40 | 9 | 88 | Dale Jarrett | Ford | 210 | 85907 | engine | 0 | 43 |
| 41 | 29 | 48 | Jimmie Johnson | Chevrolet | 128 | 74750 | crash | 0 | 40 |
| 42 | 41 | 72 | Kirk Shelmerdine | Ford | 19 | 54895 | rear end | 0 | 37 |
| 43 | 40 | 09 | Joe Ruttman | Dodge | 1 | 54196 | parked | 0 | 34 |

== Standings after the race ==
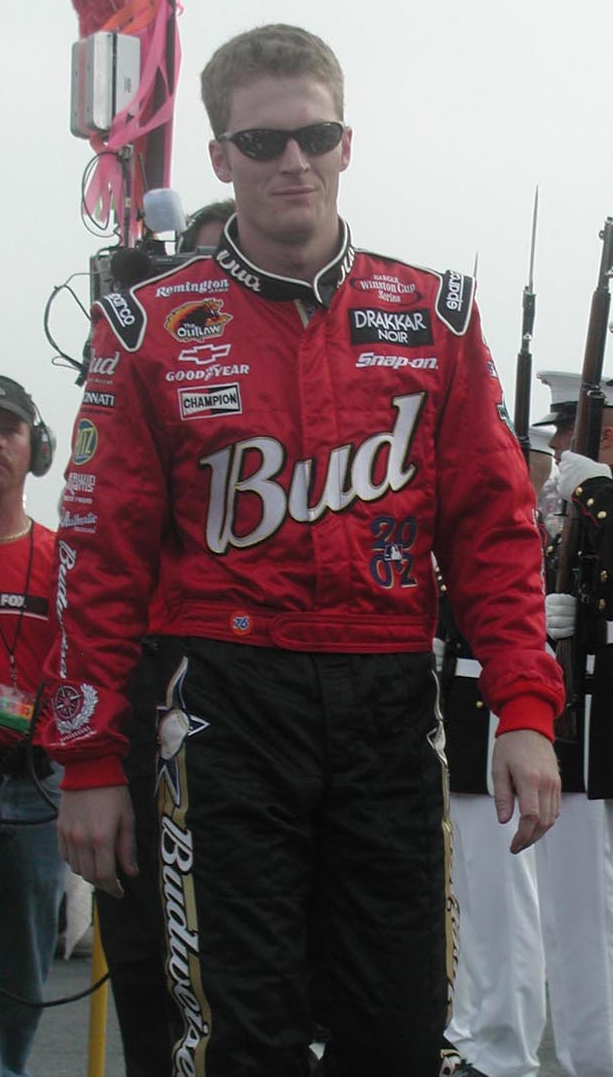
Dale Earnhardt Jr. led the points standings after the race.

| Pos | Driver | Points |
|---|---|---|
| 1 | Dale Earnhardt Jr. | 340 |
| 2 | Matt Kenseth | 333 |
| 3 | Kevin Harvick | 294 |
| 4 | Scott Wimmer | 288 |
| 5 | Jeff Gordon | 286 |
| 6 | Tony Stewart | 265 |
| 7 | Kurt Busch | 257 |
| 8 | Elliott Sadler | 255 |
| 9 | Ward Burton | 250 |
| 10 | Joe Nemechek | 241 |

| Previous race: 2004 Daytona 500 | Nextel Cup Series; 2004 season | Next race: 2004 UAW-DaimlerChrysler 400 |
