= 2004 Chase for the Nextel Cup =

Inaugural running of the NASCAR playoffs

The 2004 Chase for the Nextel Cup served as the premiere ten-race playoff series among the top ten drivers in the NASCAR Nextel Cup Series. After the Chevy Rock and Roll 400 on September 11, 2004, the ten drivers atop the standings were locked into the playoff. Kurt Busch won the driver's championship for the first time in his career.

== Participants ==
1. Jeff Gordon — Hendrick Motorsports No. 24 (Rick Hendrick) 5050
2. Jimmie Johnson — Hendrick Motorsports No. 48 (Jeff Gordon 1) -5
3. Dale Earnhardt Jr. — Dale Earnhardt, Inc. No. 8 (Teresa Earnhardt) -10
4. Tony Stewart — Joe Gibbs Racing No. 20 (Joe Gibbs) -15
5. Matt Kenseth — Roush Racing No. 17 (Mark Martin 2) -20
6. Elliott Sadler — Robert Yates Racing No. 38 (Robert Yates) -25
7. Kurt Busch — Roush Racing No. 97 (Georgetta Roush 3) -30
8. Mark Martin — Roush Racing No. 6 (Jack Roush) -35
9. Jeremy Mayfield — Evernham Motorsports No. 19 (Ray Evernham) -40
10. Ryan Newman — Penske Racing No. 12 (Roger Penske) -45

== Final standings ==
1. Kurt Busch – 6506
2. Jimmie Johnson – 6498
3. Jeff Gordon – 6490
4. Mark Martin – 6399
5. Dale Earnhardt Jr. – 6368
6. Tony Stewart – 6326
7. Ryan Newman – 6180
8. Matt Kenseth – 6069
9. Elliott Sadler – 6024
10. Jeremy Mayfield – 6000

== Notes ==
1 – Jeff Gordon is the official owner of the No. 48, though his work in signing Johnson to Hendrick Motorsports, licensing of merchandising through Hendrick Gordon Licensing LLC, and holds minority interest in the team.

2 – Mark Martin is the official owner of the No. 17 because of his work in signing Kenseth, and holds minority interest in that team.

3 – Georgetta Roush is Jack's mother, and the official owner of the No. 97.

| Preceded by 2003 NASCAR Winston Cup Series | NASCAR seasons 2004; Inaugural season of the Chase for the Nextel Cup | Succeeded by 2005 Chase for the Nextel Cup |
