= 2004 Coca-Cola 600 =

Race details
- Race 12 of 36 in the 2004 NASCAR Nextel Cup Series
- 2004 Coca-Cola 600 program cover, with artwork by NASCAR artist Sam Bass. The painting is called "Victory Circle!"
- Date: May 30, 2004
- Location: Lowe's Motor Speedway, Concord, North Carolina
- Course: Permanent racing facility
- Course length: 1.5 miles (2.4 km)
- Distance: 400 laps, 600 mi (965.606 km)
- Average speed: 142.763 mph (229.755 km/h)
- Attendance: 180,000

Pole position
Driver	Jimmie Johnson	Hendrick Motorsports
- Time: 27.981

Most laps led
Driver	Jimmie Johnson	Hendrick Motorsports
- Laps: 334

Winner
No. 48	Jimmie Johnson	Hendrick Motorsports

Television in the United States
- Network: Fox
- Announcers: Mike Joy, Darrell Waltrip, Larry McReynolds

The 2004 Coca-Cola 600, the 45th running of the race, was a NASCAR Nextel Cup Series race held on May 30, 2004 at Lowe's Motor Speedway in Concord, North Carolina. Contested at 400 laps on the 1.5 mile (2.4 km) speedway, it was the 12th race of the 2004 NASCAR Nextel Cup Series season. Jimmie Johnson of Hendrick Motorsports won the race, his second win of the season and also at Charlotte. Michael Waltrip finished 2nd and Matt Kenseth finished 3rd.

Failed to qualify: Steve Park (No. 7), Todd Bodine (No. 37), Carl Long (No. 46), Stanton Barrett (No. 94), Geoffrey Bodine (No. 98), Morgan Shepherd (No. 89), Jeff Fultz (No. 78), Kirk Shelmerdine (No. 72), Andy Hillenburg (No. 80)

== Background ==
Lowe's Motor Speedway, the track where the race was held.

Lowe's Motor Speedway is a motorsports complex located in Concord, North Carolina, United States 13 miles from Charlotte, North Carolina. The complex features a 1.5 miles (2.4 km) quad oval track that hosts NASCAR racing including the prestigious Coca-Cola 600 on Memorial Day weekend and the Nextel All-Star Challenge, as well as the UAW-GM Quality 500. The speedway was built in 1959 by Bruton Smith and is considered the home track for NASCAR with many race teams located in the Charlotte area. The track is owned and operated by Speedway Motorsports Inc. (SMI) with Humpy Wheeler as track president.

== Entry list ==
Car	Driver	Make	Team
0	Ward Burton	Chevrolet	Haas CNC Racing
01	Joe Nemechek	Chevrolet	MBV Motorsports
1	John Andretti	Chevrolet	Dale Earnhardt, Inc.
02	Hermie Sadler	Chevrolet	SCORE Motorsports
2	Rusty Wallace	Dodge	Penske Racing
4	Jimmy Spencer	Chevrolet	Morgan–McClure Motorsports
5	Terry Labonte	Chevrolet	Hendrick Motorsports
6	Mark Martin	Ford	Roush Racing
7	Steve Park	Dodge	Ultra Motorsports
8	Dale Earnhardt Jr.	Chevrolet	Dale Earnhardt, Inc.
09	Bobby Hamilton Jr.	Dodge	Phoenix Racing
9	Kasey Kahne	Dodge	Evernham Motorsports
10	Scott Riggs	Chevrolet	MBV Motorsports
12	Ryan Newman	Dodge	Penske Racing
15	Michael Waltrip	Chevrolet	Dale Earnhardt, Inc.
16	Greg Biffle	Ford	Roush Racing
17	Matt Kenseth	Ford	Roush Racing
18	Bobby Labonte	Chevrolet	Joe Gibbs Racing
19	Jeremy Mayfield	Dodge	Evernham Motorsports
20	Tony Stewart	Chevrolet	Joe Gibbs Racing
21	Ricky Rudd	Ford	Wood Brothers Racing
22	Scott Wimmer	Dodge	Bill Davis Racing
23	Dave Blaney	Dodge	Bill Davis Racing
24	Jeff Gordon	Chevrolet	Hendrick Motorsports
25	Brian Vickers	Chevrolet	Hendrick Motorsports
29	Kevin Harvick	Chevrolet	Richard Childress Racing
30	Johnny Sauter	Chevrolet	Richard Childress Racing
31	Robby Gordon	Chevrolet	Richard Childress Racing
32	Ricky Craven	Chevrolet	PPI Motorsports
37	Todd Bodine	Dodge	R&J Racing
38	Elliott Sadler	Ford	Robert Yates Racing
40	Sterling Marlin	Dodge	Chip Ganassi Racing
41	Casey Mears	Dodge	Chip Ganassi Racing
42	Jamie McMurray	Dodge	Chip Ganassi Racing
43	Jeff Green	Dodge	Petty Enterprises
45	Kyle Petty	Dodge	Petty Enterprises
46	Carl Long	Dodge	Glenn Racing
48	Jimmie Johnson	Chevrolet	Hendrick Motorsports
49	Ken Schrader	Dodge	BAM Racing
50	Derrike Cope	Dodge	Arnold Motorsports
51	Kevin Lepage	Chevrolet	Competitive Edge Motorsports
72	Kirk Shelmerdine	Ford	Kirk Shelmerdine Racing
77	Brendan Gaughan	Dodge	Penske-Jasper Racing
78	Jeff Fultz	Ford	Harrah Racing
80	Andy Hillenburg	Ford	Hover Motorsports
84	Kyle Busch	Chevrolet	Hendrick Motorsports
88	Dale Jarrett	Ford	Robert Yates Racing
89	Morgan Shepherd	Dodge	Shepherd Racing Ventures
94	Stanton Barrett	Chevrolet	W.W. Motorsports
97	Kurt Busch	Ford	Roush Racing
98	Geoffrey Bodine	Ford	Mach 1 Motorsports
99	Jeff Burton	Ford	Roush Racing

== Qualifying ==
Pos.	Car	Driver	Manufacturer	Avg. Speed (mph)	Time
1	48	Jimmie Johnson	Chevrolet	187.052	28.869
2	12	Ryan Newman	Dodge	186.948	28.885
3	24	Jeff Gordon	Chevrolet	186.922	28.889
4	38	Elliott Sadler	Ford	186.619	28.936
5	25	Brian Vickers	Chevrolet	186.265	28.991
6	20	Tony Stewart	Chevrolet	186.111	29.015
7	77	Brendan Gaughan	Dodge	186.040	29.026
8	43	Jeff Green	Dodge	185.784	29.066
9	18	Bobby Labonte	Chevrolet	185.612	29.093
10	8	Dale Earnhardt, Jr.	Chevrolet	185.312	29.140
11	23	Dave Blaney	Dodge	185.287	29.144
12	15	Michael Waltrip	Chevrolet	185.109	29.172
13	01	Joe Nemechek	Chevrolet	184.976	29.193
14	41	Casey Mears	Dodge	184.837	29.215
15	19	Jeremy Mayfield	Dodge	184.805	29.220
16	2	Rusty Wallace	Dodge	184.679	29.240
17	0	Ward Burton	Chevrolet	184.477	29.272
18	6	Mark Martin	Ford	184.464	29.274
19	9	Kasey Kahne	Dodge	184.445	29.277
20	31	Robby Gordon	Chevrolet	184.231	29.311
21	42	Jamie McMurray	Dodge	184.093	29.333
22	51	Kevin Lepage	Chevrolet	184.080	29.335
23	29	Kevin Harvick	Chevrolet	183.986	29.350
24	4	Jimmy Spencer	Chevrolet	183.986	29.350
25	1	John Andretti	Chevrolet	183.943	29.357
26	32	Ricky Craven	Chevrolet	183.924	29.360
27	84	Kyle Busch	Chevrolet	183.842	29.373
28	10	Scott Riggs	Chevrolet	183.792	29.381
29	22	Scott Wimmer	Dodge	183.755	29.387
30	16	Greg Biffle	Ford	183.736	29.390
31	09	Bobby Hamilton, Jr.	Dodge	183.667	29.401
32	97	Kurt Busch	Ford	183.586	29.414
33	88	Dale Jarrett	Ford	183.580	29.415
34	99	Jeff Burton	Ford	183.492	29.429
35	5	Terry Labonte	Chevrolet	183.461	29.434
36	40	Sterling Marlin	Dodge	183.424	29.440
37	17	Matt Kenseth	Ford	183.256	29.467
38	50	Derrike Cope	Dodge	183.088	29.494
Provisionals
39	30	Johnny Sauter	Chevrolet	182.260	29.628
40	21	Ricky Rudd	Ford	182.933	29.519
41	49	Ken Schrader	Dodge	182.692	29.558
42	45	Kyle Petty	Dodge	180.808	29.866
43	02	Hermie Sadler	Chevrolet	180.234	29.961
Failed to qualify
44	7	Steve Park	Dodge	182.162	29.644
45	37	Todd Bodine	Dodge	182.149	29.646
46	46	Carl Long	Dodge	181.238	29.795
47	94	Stanton Barrett	Chevrolet	180.048	29.992
48	98	Geoffrey Bodine	Ford	179.820	30.030
49	89	Morgan Shepherd	Dodge	179.372	30.105
50	78	Jeff Fultz	Ford	179.330	30.112
51	72	Kirk Shelmerdine	Ford	177.212	30.472
52	80	Andy Hillenburg	Ford	171.141	31.553
WD	33	Kerry Earnhardt	Chevrolet	0.000	0.000

== Race results ==
Fin	St	#	Driver	Make	Team	Laps	Led	Status	Pts
1	1	48	Jimmie Johnson	Chevrolet	Hendrick Motorsports	400	334	running	190
2	12	15	Michael Waltrip	Chevrolet	Dale Earnhardt, Inc.	400	0	running	170
3	37	17	Matt Kenseth	Ford	Roush Racing	400	1	running	170
4	21	42	Jamie McMurray	Dodge	Chip Ganassi Racing	400	15	running	165
5	4	38	Elliott Sadler	Ford	Robert Yates Racing	400	41	running	160
6	10	8	Dale Earnhardt, Jr.	Chevrolet	Dale Earnhardt, Inc.	400	2	running	155
7	14	41	Casey Mears	Dodge	Chip Ganassi Racing	400	2	running	151
8	15	19	Jeremy Mayfield	Dodge	Evernham Motorsports	400	0	running	142
9	6	20	Tony Stewart	Chevrolet	Joe Gibbs Racing	400	0	running	138
10	16	2	Rusty Wallace	Dodge	Penske Racing	400	0	running	134
11	32	97	Kurt Busch	Ford	Roush Racing	400	0	running	130
12	19	9	Kasey Kahne	Dodge	Evernham Motorsports	400	5	running	132
13	9	18	Bobby Labonte	Chevrolet	Joe Gibbs Racing	400	0	running	124
14	13	01	Joe Nemechek	Chevrolet	MBV Motorsports	398	0	running	121
15	5	25	Brian Vickers	Chevrolet	Hendrick Motorsports	398	0	running	118
16	17	0	Ward Burton	Chevrolet	Haas CNC Racing	398	0	running	115
17	11	23	Dave Blaney	Dodge	Bill Davis Racing	398	0	running	112
18	33	88	Dale Jarrett	Ford	Robert Yates Racing	398	0	running	109
19	25	1	John Andretti	Chevrolet	Dale Earnhardt, Inc.	398	0	running	106
20	20	31	Robby Gordon	Chevrolet	Richard Childress Racing	397	0	running	103
21	30	16	Greg Biffle	Ford	Roush Racing	397	0	running	100
22	34	99	Jeff Burton	Ford	Roush Racing	397	0	running	97
23	23	29	Kevin Harvick	Chevrolet	Richard Childress Racing	396	0	running	94
24	26	32	Ricky Craven	Chevrolet	PPI Motorsports	396	0	running	91
25	28	10	Scott Riggs	Chevrolet	MBV Motorsports	395	0	running	88
26	40	21	Ricky Rudd	Ford	Wood Brothers Racing	395	0	running	85
27	8	43	Jeff Green	Dodge	Petty Enterprises	395	0	running	82
28	29	22	Scott Wimmer	Dodge	Bill Davis Racing	394	0	running	79
29	24	4	Jimmy Spencer	Chevrolet	Morgan–McClure Motorsports	394	0	running	76
30	3	24	Jeff Gordon	Chevrolet	Hendrick Motorsports	393	0	running	73
31	41	49	Ken Schrader	Dodge	BAM Racing	393	0	running	70
32	27	84	Kyle Busch	Chevrolet	Hendrick Motorsports	393	0	running	67
33	7	77	Brendan Gaughan	Dodge	Penske-Jasper Racing	392	0	running	64
34	38	50	Derrike Cope	Dodge	Arnold Motorsports	391	0	running	61
35	2	12	Ryan Newman	Dodge	Penske Racing	390	0	engine	58
36	18	6	Mark Martin	Ford	Roush Racing	387	0	running	55
37	35	5	Terry Labonte	Chevrolet	Hendrick Motorsports	385	0	running	52
38	42	45	Kyle Petty	Dodge	Petty Enterprises	384	0	running	49
39	36	40	Sterling Marlin	Dodge	Chip Ganassi Racing	331	0	rear end	46
40	39	30	Johnny Sauter	Chevrolet	Richard Childress Racing	203	0	crash	43
41	43	02	Hermie Sadler	Chevrolet	SCORE Motorsports	137	0	engine	40
42	31	09	Bobby Hamilton, Jr.	Dodge	Phoenix Racing	73	0	handling	37
43	22	51	Kevin Lepage	Chevrolet	Competitive Edge Motorsports	56	0	overheating	0

== Race statistics ==
- Time of race: 4:12:10
- Average Speed: 142.763 miles per hour (229.755 km/h)
- Pole Speed: 187.052 miles per hour (301.031 km/h)
- Cautions: 7 for 37 laps
- Margin of Victory: under caution
- Lead changes: 16
- Percent of race run under caution: 9.2%
- Average green flag run: 51.9 laps

Previous race: 2004 Chevy American Revolution 400	Nextel Cup Series; 2004 season	Next race: 2004 MBNA America 400 "A Salute to Heroes"
