= 2005 Advance Auto Parts 500 =

Race details
- Race 6 of 36 in the 2005 NASCAR Nextel Cup Series
- 2005 Advance Auto Parts 500 program cover
- Date: April 10, 2005
- Location: Martinsville Speedway, Ridgeway, Virginia
- Course: Permanent racing facility
- Course length: .526 miles (.847 km)
- Distance: 500 laps, 263 mi (423 km)
- Weather: Warm with temperatures approaching 80.6 °F (27.0 °C); wind speeds up to 6 miles per hour (9.7 km/h)
- Average speed: 72.009 mph (115.887 km/h)

Pole position
Driver	Scott Riggs	MB2 Motorsports
- Time: 19.588 seconds

Most laps led
Driver	Tony Stewart	Joe Gibbs Racing
- Laps: 247

Winner
No. 24	Jeff Gordon	Hendrick Motorsports

Television in the United States
- Network: Fox
- Announcers: Mike Joy, Darrell Waltrip, Larry McReynolds
- Nielsen ratings: 5.1

The 2005 Advance Auto Parts 500 was a NASCAR Nextel Cup Series stock car race held on April 10, 2005 at Martinsville Speedway in Ridgeway, Virginia. The race was the sixth of the 2005 NASCAR Nextel Cup Series season. The pole position was won by Scott Riggs of MB2 Motorsports, his first career pole, while Tony Stewart of Joe Gibbs Racing led the most laps with 247. Hendrick Motorsports' Jeff Gordon won the race. Sergeant Sean McGuire gave the starting command from Iraq.

== Qualifying ==
Pos	No.	Driver	Manufacture	Sponsor	Avg. Speed	Time	Time behind driver
1	10	Scott Riggs	Chevrolet	Valvoline	96.671	19.588	0.000
2	12	Ryan Newman	Dodge	Alltel	96.657	19.591	-0.003
3	19	Jeremy Mayfield	Dodge	Dodge Dealers / UAW	96.583	19.606	-0.018
4	2	Rusty Wallace	Dodge	Miller Lite	96.558	19.611	-0.023
5	29	Kevin Harvick	Chevrolet	GM Goodwrench	96.376	19.648	-0.060
6	18	Bobby Labonte	Chevrolet	Interstate Batteries	96.259	19.672	-0.084
7	20	Tony Stewart	Chevrolet	The Home Depot	96.195	19.685	-0.097
8	16	Greg Biffle	Ford	Jackson Hewitt	96.127	19.699	-0.111
9	97	Kurt Busch	Ford	Crown Royal	96.063	19.712	-0.124
10	1	Joe Nemechek	Chevrolet	U.S. Army	96.015	19.722	-0.134
11	49	Ken Schrader	Dodge	Schwan's Home Service	95.917	19.742	-0.154
12	11	Jason Leffler	Chevrolet	FedEx Express	95.888	19.748	-0.160
13	21	Ricky Rudd	Ford	Motorcraft Genuine Parts	95.864	19.753	-0.165
14	43	Jeff Green	Dodge	Cheerios / Betty Crocker	95.748	19.777	-0.189
15	0	Mike Bliss	Chevrolet	NetZero Best Buy	95.743	19.778	-0.190
16	24	Jeff Gordon	Chevrolet	DuPont	95.728	19.781	-0.193
17	77	Travis Kvapil	Dodge	Kodak / Jasper Engines	95.699	19.787	-0.199
18	17	Matt Kenseth	Ford	DEWALT Power Tools	95.574	19.813	-0.225
19	45	Kyle Petty	Dodge	Georgia-Pacific / Brawny	95.554	19.817	-0.229
20	40	Sterling Marlin	Dodge	Coors Light	95.458	19.837	-0.249
21	5	Kyle Busch	Chevrolet	Kellogg's	95.280	19.874	-0.286
22	6	Mark Martin	Ford	Viagra	95.271	19.876	-0.288
23	4	Mike Wallace	Chevrolet	Lucas Oil Products	95.208	19.889	-0.301
24	41	Casey Mears	Dodge	Target	95.194	19.892	-0.304
25	38	Elliott Sadler	Ford	M&M's	95.170	19.897	-0.309
26	8	Dale Earnhardt Jr	Chevrolet	Budweiser	95.127	19.906	-0.318
27	25	Brian Vickers	Chevrolet	GMAC / ditech.com	95.089	19.914	-0.326
28	32	Bobby Hamilton Jr	Chevrolet	Tide	95.046	19.923	-0.335
29	42	Jamie McMurray	Dodge	Texaco / Havoline	95.008	19.931	-0.343
30	31	Jeff Burton	Chevrolet	Cingular Wireless	94.955	19.942	-0.354
31	15	Michael Waltrip	Chevrolet	NAPA Auto Parts	94.917	19.950	-0.362
32	88	Dale Jarrett	Ford	UPS	94.865	19.961	-0.373
33	22	Scott Wimmer	Dodge	Caterpillar	94.652	20.006	-0.418
34	75	Mike Garvey	Dodge	Jani-King / Rinaldi Air Conditioning	94.614	20.014	-0.426
35	9	Kasey Kahne	Dodge	Dodge Dealers / UAW	94.562	20.025	-0.437
36	99	Carl Edwards	Ford	Scotts	94.519	20.034	-0.446
37	48	Jimmie Johnson	Chevrolet	Lowe's	94.491	20.040	-0.452
38	66	Hermie Sadler	Ford	Peak Fitness	94.336	20.073	-0.485
39	34	Randy LaJoie	Chevrolet	Mach One Inc.	94.129	20.117	-0.529
40	09	Johnny Sauter	Dodge	Miccosukee Resort & Gaming	93.929	20.160	-0.572
41	37	Kevin Lepage	Dodge	Carter's Royal Dispos-all	93.530	20.246	-0.658
42	07	Dave Blaney	Chevrolet	SKF / Jack Daniel's	93.525	20.247	-0.659
43	7	Robby Gordon	Chevrolet	Harrah's	93.354	20.284	-0.696
44	92	Stanton Barrett	Chevrolet	Front Row Motorsports		20.371	
45	61	Jeff Fuller	Dodge	Sisco Motorsports		20.398	
46	27	Kirk Shelmerdine	Ford	Kirk Shelmerdine Racing		20.480	
47	00	Carl Long	Chevrolet	Buyer's Choice Auto Warranties		20.598	

== Race ==
Pole-sitter Scott Riggs lost the lead on the first lap after getting loose in turn 4, sliding up and colliding with Ryan Newman, allowing Jeremy Mayfield to take the lead. A tire on Newman's car popped, which brought out the first caution. Much of the early portion of the race was dominated by Mayfield, Tony Stewart, Bobby Labonte, and defending race winner Rusty Wallace. Meanwhile, Jeff Gordon fell behind three laps by lap 70 due to a loose wheel, but regained two laps, and via the beneficiary rule, got back on the lead lap after a caution on lap 276, while gaining the lead with 35 laps left. Sometime during the race, Gordon and Kurt Busch made contact, sending Busch into the wall. With three laps left, Travis Kvapil's car spilled oil on the track, bringing out the final caution. Gordon had a strong jump on the restart, and held off Kasey Kahne, Mark Martin and Newman to claim his 71st career win, his seventh at Martinsville, and his second of the season. Wallace closed out the Top 5, with Sterling Marlin, Ricky Rudd, points leader Jimmie Johnson, Elliott Sadler, and Joe Nemechek rounding out the Top 10.

== Results ==
POS	ST	#	DRIVER	SPONSOR / OWNER	CAR	LAPS	MONEY	STATUS	LED	PTS
1	16	24	Jeff Gordon	DuPont (Rick Hendrick)	Chevrolet	500	186051	running	36	185
2	35	9	Kasey Kahne	Dodge Dealers / UAW (Ray Evernham)	Dodge	500	143915	running	0	170
3	22	6	Mark Martin	Viagra (Jack Roush)	Ford	500	109625	running	1	170
4	2	12	Ryan Newman	Alltel (Roger Penske)	Dodge	500	132241	running	25	165
5	4	2	Rusty Wallace	Miller Lite (Roger Penske)	Dodge	500	111308	running	47	160
6	20	40	Sterling Marlin	Coors Light (Chip Ganassi)	Dodge	500	109758	running	6	155
7	13	21	Ricky Rudd	Motorcraft Genuine Parts (Wood Brothers)	Ford	500	104439	running	0	146
8	37	48	Jimmie Johnson	Lowe's (Rick Hendrick)	Chevrolet	500	120041	running	0	142
9	25	38	Elliott Sadler	M&M's (Yates Racing)	Ford	500	114091	running	0	138
10	10	01	Joe Nemechek	U.S. Army (Nelson Bowers)	Chevrolet	500	103508	running	0	134
11	18	17	Matt Kenseth	DeWalt Power Tools (Jack Roush)	Ford	500	118186	running	1	135
12	12	11	Jason Leffler	FedEx Express (Joe Gibbs)	Chevrolet	500	69375	running	0	127
13	26	8	Dale Earnhardt, Jr.	Budweiser (Dale Earnhardt, Inc.)	Chevrolet	500	118133	running	0	124
14	32	88	Dale Jarrett	UPS (Yates Racing)	Ford	500	106733	running	0	121
15	3	19	Jeremy Mayfield	Dodge Dealers / UAW (Ray Evernham)	Dodge	499	111095	running	68	123
16	30	31	Jeff Burton	Cingular Wireless (Richard Childress)	Chevrolet	499	98895	running	0	115
17	24	41	Casey Mears	Target (Chip Ganassi)	Dodge	499	95688	running	0	112
18	19	45	Kyle Petty	Georgia-Pacific / Brawny (Petty Enterprises)	Dodge	498	84958	running	0	109
19	9	97	Kurt Busch	Crown Royal (Jack Roush)	Ford	498	119325	running	33	111
20	43	7	Robby Gordon	Harrah's (Robby Gordon)	Chevrolet	498	67700	running	4	108
21	1	10	Scott Riggs	Valvoline (James Rocco)	Chevrolet	498	95858	running	0	100
22	14	43	Jeff Green	Cheerios / Betty Crocker (Petty Enterprises)	Dodge	497	99286	running	0	97
23	23	4	Mike Wallace	Lucas Oil Products (Larry McClure)	Chevrolet	497	70450	running	0	94
24	11	49	Ken Schrader	Schwan's Home Service (Beth Ann Morgenthau)	Dodge	496	69200	running	0	91
25	29	42	Jamie McMurray	Texaco / Havoline (Chip Ganassi)	Dodge	496	77275	running	0	88
26	7	20	Tony Stewart	The Home Depot (Joe Gibbs)	Chevrolet	493	128861	running	247	95
27	17	77	Travis Kvapil	Kodak / Jasper Engines (Doug Bawel)	Dodge	490	77810	engine	0	82
28	41	37	Kevin Lepage	Carter's Royal Dispos-All (John Carter)	Dodge	489	65010	running	0	79
29	8	16	Greg Biffle	Jackson Hewitt (Jack Roush)	Ford	487	82825	running	0	76
30	31	15	Michael Waltrip	NAPA Auto Parts (Dale Earnhardt, Inc.)	Chevrolet	477	95414	running	0	73
31	33	22	Scott Wimmer	Caterpillar (Bill Davis)	Dodge	466	85097	running	0	70
32	5	29	Kevin Harvick	GM Goodwrench (Richard Childress)	Chevrolet	436	111661	running	0	67
33	6	18	Bobby Labonte	Interstate Batteries (Joe Gibbs)	Chevrolet	435	102225	engine	32	69
34	42	07	Dave Blaney	SKF / Jack Daniel's (Richard Childress)	Chevrolet	416	72075	running	0	61
35	27	25	Brian Vickers	GMAC / ditech.com (Rick Hendrick)	Chevrolet	412	72025	running	0	58
36	15	0	Mike Bliss	NetZero / Best Buy (Gene Haas)	Chevrolet	410	63975	overheating	0	55
37	38	66	Hermie Sadler	Peak Fitness (Jeff Stec)	Ford	340	63925	crash	0	52
38	36	99	Carl Edwards	Scotts (Jack Roush)	Ford	321	81875	running	0	49
39	21	5	Kyle Busch	Kellogg's (Rick Hendrick)	Chevrolet	304	71815	overheating	0	46
40	28	32	Bobby Hamilton, Jr.	Tide (Cal Wells)	Chevrolet	151	63740	overheating	0	43
41	40	09	Johnny Sauter	Miccosukee Gaming & Resorts (James Finch)	Dodge	55	63690	brakes	0	40
42	39	34	Randy LaJoie	Mach One Inc. (William Edwards)	Chevrolet	27	63640	engine	0	37
43	34	75	Mike Garvey	Jani-King / Rinaldi Air Conditioning (Robert Rinaldi)	Dodge	18	63053	brakes	0	34
Failed to qualify, withdrew, or driver changes:
POS	NAME	NBR	SPONSOR	OWNER	CAR					
44	Stanton Barrett	92	Front Row Motorsports	Bob Jenkins	Chevrolet					
45	Jeff Fuller	61	Sisco Motorsports	Buddy Sisco	Dodge					
46	Kirk Shelmerdine	27	Kirk Shelmerdine Racing	Kirk Shelmerdine	Ford					
47	Carl Long	00	Buyer's Choice Auto Warranties	Raynard McGlynn	Chevrolet					
WD	Morgan Shepherd	89	Racing With Jesus / Red Line Oil	Morgan Shepherd	Dodge					

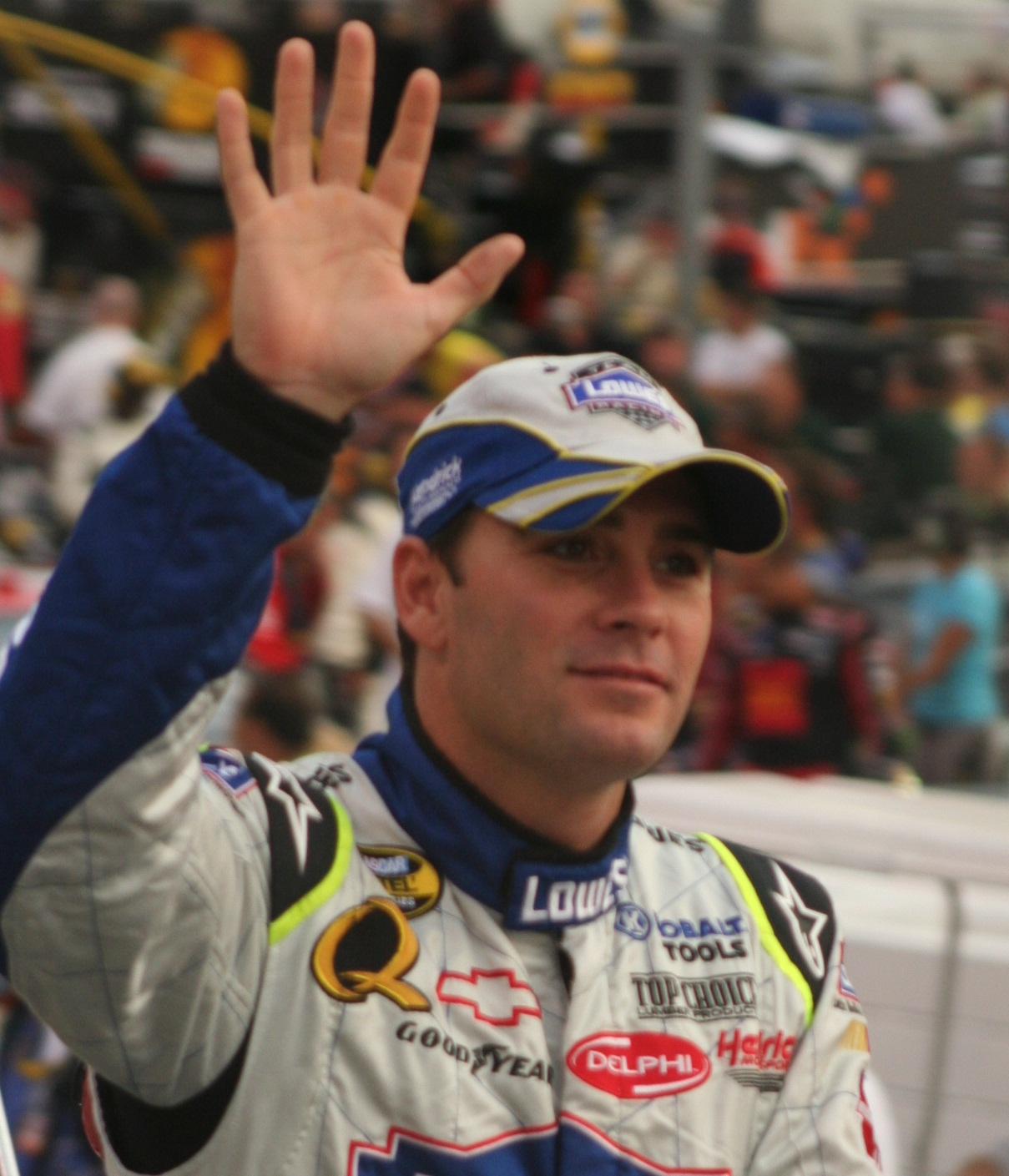
Jimmie Johnson led the point standings after the race.

== Race statistics ==
- Time: 3:38:52
- Average speed: 72.099 miles per hour (116.032 km/h)
- Pole speed: 96.671 miles per hour (155.577 km/h)
- Cautions: 16 for 91 laps
- Margin of victory: 0.593
- Lead changes: 17
- Percent of race run under caution: 18.2%
- Average green flag run: 24.1 laps

== Standings after the race ==
Pos	Driver	Points
1	Jimmie Johnson	977
2	Greg Biffle	817
3	Elliott Sadler	795
4	Mark Martin	779
5	Tony Stewart	774
6	Jeff Gordon	772
7	Rusty Wallace	771
8	Ryan Newman	753
9	Kurt Busch	746
10	Dale Jarrett	732

Previous race: 2005 Food City 500	Nextel Cup Series; 2005 season	Next race: 2005 Samsung/Radio Shack 500
