= 2005 Sylvania 300 =

Race details
- Race 27 of 36 in the 2005 NASCAR Nextel Cup Series
- 2005 Sylvania 300 program cover, with artwork by Jane Bready
- Date: September 18, 2005
- Location: New Hampshire Motor Speedway, Loudon, New Hampshire
- Course: Permanent racing facility
- Course length: 1.058 miles (1.702 km)
- Distance: 300 laps, 317.4 mi (510.805 km)
- Weather: Mild with temperatures approaching 73.9 °F (23.3 °C); wind speeds up to 12 miles per hour (19 km/h)
- Average speed: 95.891 mph (154.322 km/h)

Pole position
Driver	Tony Stewart	Joe Gibbs Racing
- Time: 29.043

Most laps led
Driver	Tony Stewart	Joe Gibbs Racing
- Laps: 173

Winner
No. 12	Ryan Newman	Penske-Jasper Racing

Television in the United States
- Network: TNT
- Announcers: Bill Weber, Wally Dallenbach Jr. and Benny Parsons
- Nielsen ratings: 3.4/9; (3.786 million)

The 2005 Sylvania 300 was the twenty-seventh stock car race of the 2005 NASCAR Nextel Cup Series and the first in the ten-race season-ending Chase for the Nextel Cup. It was held on September 18, 2005 at New Hampshire Motor Speedway in Loudon, New Hampshire. The 300-lap race was won by Ryan Newman of the Penske-Jasper Racing team. Tony Stewart finished second and Matt Kenseth came in third.

== Background ==
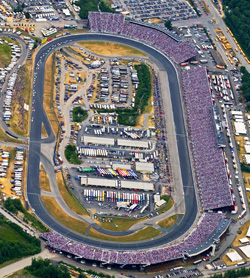
New Hampshire Motor Speedway, where the race was held

New Hampshire Motor Speedway is one of ten intermediate tracks that hold NASCAR races. The standard track at New Hampshire Motor Speedway is a four-turn oval track, 1 mile (1.6 km) long. Its banking in the turns varies from two to seven degrees, while the front stretch, the finish line, and the back stretch are all banked at one degree.

Before the race, Tony Stewart led the Drivers' Championship with 5,050 points, followed by Greg Biffle with 5,045. Jimmie Johnson was fourth with 5,035 points and Kurt Busch in fifth had 5,030 points. Mark Martin was sixth with 5,025 points with Jeremy Mayfield seventh on 5,020 points. Matt Kenseth was tied with Carl Edwards on 5,015 points and Ryan Newman on 5,005 points rounded out the top ten. In the Manufacturers' Championship,

Busch was the race's defending champion.

== Entry list ==
Car #	Driver	Make	Team
0	Mike Bliss	Chevrolet	Gene Haas
00	Carl Long	Dodge	Raynard McGlynn
01	Joe Nemechek	Chevrolet	Nelson Bowers
2	Rusty Wallace	Dodge	Roger Penske
4	Mike Wallace	Chevrolet	Larry McClure
5	Kyle Busch	Chevrolet	Rick Hendrick
6	Mark Martin	Ford	Jack Roush
07	Dave Blaney	Chevrolet	Richard Childress
7	Robby Gordon	Chevrolet	James Smith
8	Dale Earnhardt Jr.	Chevrolet	Teresa Earnhardt
9	Kasey Kahne	Dodge	Ray Evernham
10	Scott Riggs	Chevrolet	James Rocco
11	J. J. Yeley	Chevrolet	J D Gibbs
12	Ryan Newman	Dodge	Roger Penske
15	Michael Waltrip	Chevrolet	Teresa Earnhardt
16	Greg Biffle	Ford	Geoff Smith
17	Matt Kenseth	Ford	Mark Martin
18	Bobby Labonte	Chevrolet	Joe Gibbs
19	Jeremy Mayfield	Dodge	Ray Evernham
20	Tony Stewart	Chevrolet	Joe Gibbs
21	Ricky Rudd	Ford	Glen Wood
22	Scott Wimmer	Dodge	Bill Davis
24	Jeff Gordon	Chevrolet	Rick Hendrick
25	Brian Vickers	Chevrolet	Mary Hendrick
27	Kirk Shelmerdine	Ford	Kirk Shelmerdine
29	Kevin Harvick	Chevrolet	Richard Childress
31	Jeff Burton	Chevrolet	Richard Childress
32	Bobby Hamilton Jr.	Chevrolet	Calvin Wells III
34	Ted Christopher	Chevrolet	William Edwards
37	Tony Raines	Dodge	John Carter
38	Elliott Sadler	Ford	Robert Yates
40	Sterling Marlin	Dodge	Felix Sabates
41	Casey Mears	Dodge	Chip Ganassi
42	Jamie McMurray	Dodge	Floyd Ganassi
43	Jeff Green	Dodge	Richard L Petty
45	Kyle Petty	Dodge	Kyle Petty
48	Jimmie Johnson	Chevrolet	Jeff Gordon
49	Ken Schrader	Dodge	Elizabeth Morgenthau
50	Jimmy Spencer	Dodge	Don Arnold
51	Stuart Kirby	Chevrolet	Joe Auer
66	Mike Garvey	Ford	Jeff Stec
75	Wayne Anderson	Dodge	Robert Rinaldi
77	Travis Kvapil	Dodge	Douglas Bawel
88	Dale Jarrett	Ford	Robert Yates
89	Morgan Shepherd	Dodge	Cindy Shepherd
92	Joey McCarthy	Dodge	Bob Jenkins
95	Stanton Barrett	Chevrolet	Stanton Barrett
97	Kurt Busch	Ford	Georgetta Roush
99	Carl Edwards	Ford	Jack Roush

== Practice and qualifying ==
Two practice sessions were held on Friday before the Sunday race—both of which lasted 60 minutes. During the first practice session, Gordon was fastest, placing ahead of Stewart in second and Robby Gordon in third. Newman was scored fourth, and Bobby Labonte placed fifth. Jamie McMurray, Kenseth, Dale Earnhardt Jr., Jeff Green and Casey Mears rounded out the top ten fastest drivers in the session. Later that day, Rusty Wallace set the second session's fastest time, ahead of Kyle Busch, brother Kurt Busch and Kasey Kahne in second, third and fourth respectively. Stewart was fifth, while the rest of the top ten consisted of Travis Kvapil, J. J. Yeley, Newman, Martin and Jeff Burton.

Although forty-nine cars attempted to qualify; according to NASCAR's qualifying procedure, only forty-three could race.

=== Qualifying results ===
Start	Car	Driver	Make	Avg. Speed	Time	Behind
1	20	Tony Stewart	Chevrolet	131.143	29.043	0.000
2	24	Jeff Gordon	Chevrolet	131.076	29.058	00.015
3	8	Dale Earnhardt Jr.	Chevrolet	130.779	29.124	00.081
4	17	Matt Kenseth	Ford	130.667	29.149	00.106
5	10	Scott Riggs	Chevrolet	130.465	29.194	00.151
6	38	Elliott Sadler	Ford	130.305	29.230	00.187
7	2	Rusty Wallace	Dodge	130.229	29.247	00.204
8	19	Jeremy Mayfield	Dodge	130.060	29.285	00.242
9	29	Kevin Harvick	Chevrolet	129.851	29.332	00.289
10	48	Jimmie Johnson	Chevrolet	129.820	29.339	00.296
11	01	Joe Nemechek	Chevrolet	129.798	29.344	00.301
12	97	Kurt Busch	Ford	129.727	29.360	00.317
13	12	Ryan Newman	Dodge	129.657	29.376	00.333
14	31	Jeff Burton	Chevrolet	129.454	29.422	00.379
15	6	Mark Martin	Ford	129.441	29.425	00.382
16	07	Dave Blaney	Chevrolet	129.415	29.431	00.388
17	18	Bobby Labonte	Chevrolet	129.397	29.435	00.392
18	43	Jeff Green	Dodge	129.397	29.435	00.392
19	7	Robby Gordon	Chevrolet	129.366	29.442	00.399
20	42	Jamie McMurray	Dodge	129.300	29.457	00.414
21	9	Kasey Kahne	Dodge	129.221	29.475	00.432
22	0	Mike Bliss	Chevrolet	129.129	29.496	00.453
23	41	Casey Mears	Dodge	129.081	29.507	00.464
24	99	Carl Edwards	Ford	129.003	29.525	00.482
25	4	Mike Wallace	Chevrolet	128.989	29.528	00.485
26	16	Greg Biffle	Ford	128.963	29.534	00.491
27	77	Travis Kvapil	Dodge	128.959	29.535	00.492
28	21	Ricky Rudd	Ford	128.710	29.592	00.549
29	11	J. J. Yeley	Chevrolet	128.454	29.651	00.608
30	5	Kyle Busch	Chevrolet	128.446	29.653	00.610
31	25	Brian Vickers	Chevrolet	128.230	29.703	00.660
32	32	Bobby Hamilton Jr.	Chevrolet	127.975	29.762	00.719
33	88	Dale Jarrett	Ford	127.928	29.773	00.730
34	51	Stuart Kirby	Chevrolet	127.696	29.827	00.784
35	75	Wayne Anderson	Dodge	127.564	29.858	00.815
36	15	Michael Waltrip	Chevrolet	127.453	29.884	00.841
37	40	Sterling Marlin	Dodge	127.372	29.903	00.860
38	34	Ted Christopher	Chevrolet	127.248	29.932	00.889
39	92	Joey McCarthy	Dodge	126.909	30.012	00.969
40	49	Ken Schrader	Dodge	126.749	30.050	01.007
41	22	Scott Wimmer	Dodge	126.500	30.109	01.066
42	45	Kyle Petty	Chevrolet		30.127	
43	50	Jimmy Spencer	Dodge	126.812	30.035	00.992
Failed to qualify or driver changes
44	00	Carl Long	Dodge		30.047	
45	89	Morgan Shepherd	Dodge		30.075	
46	95	Stanton Barrett	Chevrolet		30.130	
47	66	Mike Garvey	Ford		30.195	
48	37	Tony Raines	Dodge		30.208	
49	27	Kirk Shelmerdine	Ford	0.000	0.000	0.000
DC	45	Mark Green	Dodge		30.127	

== Race recap ==
Tempers flared during the race day with the tone of the afternoon was set early when Scott Riggs tangled with playoff driver Kurt Busch on lap 3. Busch was sent to the garage for repairs and fell 66 laps down. Busch stormed Riggs' pit box, and had words with crew chief, Rodney Childers. On lap 166, Kyle Busch tangled with Kasey Kahne, who was sent hard into the wall. During the caution, Kahne maneuvered his wrecked car in front of Kyle Busch. On lap 191, Michael Waltrip and Robby Gordon crashed. The next time by, Gordon attempted ram Waltrip's car with his wrecked machine, then threw his helmet at Waltrip's car. Ryan Newman eventually won the race by leading a total of 66 out of the 300 laps. Pole sitter Tony Stewart led 173 before getting passed by Newman on lap 298 of 300. This victory for Newman would jump him up in the Chase standings from 10th to 3rd with just 9 races to go with him finishing 6th at the end of the season.

== Race results ==
Fin	St	#	Driver	Make	Laps	Led	Status	Pts
1	13	12	Ryan Newman	Dodge	300	66	running	185
2	1	20	Tony Stewart	Chevy	300	173	running	180
3	4	17	Matt Kenseth	Ford	300	0	running	165
4	26	16	Greg Biffle	Ford	300	1	running	165
5	3	8	Dale Earnhardt Jr.	Chevy	300	8	running	160
6	7	2	Rusty Wallace	Dodge	300	0	running	150
7	15	6	Mark Martin	Ford	300	31	running	151
8	10	48	Jimmie Johnson	Chevy	300	0	running	142
9	14	31	Jeff Burton	Chevy	300	0	running	138
10	9	29	Kevin Harvick	Chevy	300	1	running	139
11	37	40	Sterling Marlin	Dodge	300	4	running	135
12	20	42	Jamie McMurray	Dodge	300	0	running	127
13	31	25	Brian Vickers	Chevy	300	8	running	129
14	2	24	Jeff Gordon	Chevy	300	2	running	126
15	36	15	Michael Waltrip	Chevy	300	0	running	118
16	8	19	Jeremy Mayfield	Dodge	300	0	running	115
17	18	43	Jeff Green	Dodge	300	1	running	117
18	33	88	Dale Jarrett	Ford	300	0	running	109
19	24	99	Carl Edwards	Ford	300	0	running	106
20	28	21	Ricky Rudd	Ford	300	0	running	103
21	42	45	Kyle Petty	Dodge	300	0	running	100
22	25	4	Mike Wallace	Chevy	300	0	running	97
23	23	41	Casey Mears	Dodge	299	0	running	94
24	17	18	Bobby Labonte	Chevy	299	0	running	91
25	11	01	Joe Nemechek	Chevy	299	0	running	88
26	41	22	Scott Wimmer	Dodge	299	0	running	85
27	30	5	Kyle Busch	Chevy	299	0	running	82
28	5	10	Scott Riggs	Chevy	299	0	running	79
29	32	32	Bobby Hamilton Jr.	Chevy	299	0	running	76
30	6	38	Elliott Sadler	Ford	298	4	running	78
31	39	92	Joey McCarthy	Dodge	295	0	running	70
32	34	51	Stuart Kirby	Chevy	289	0	running	67
33	16	07	Dave Blaney	Chevy	271	0	running	64
34	29	11	J. J. Yeley	Chevy	251	0	running	61
35	12	97	Kurt Busch	Ford	233	0	running	58
36	22	0	Mike Bliss	Chevy	194	0	crash	55
37	19	7	Robby Gordon	Chevy	190	1	crash	7
38	21	9	Kasey Kahne	Dodge	164	0	crash	24
39	43	50	Jimmy Spencer	Dodge	144	0	crash	46
40	40	49	Ken Schrader	Dodge	111	0	crash	43
41	27	77	Travis Kvapil	Dodge	105	0	crash	40
42	38	34	Ted Christopher	Chevy	29	0	transmission	37
43	35	75	Wayne Anderson	Dodge	16	0	engine	34

== Post-race ==
NASCAR issued the following penalties following the race:

- Kasey Kahne was $25,000 and docked him 25 points and was placed on probation for the remainder of the season for the deliberate collision against Kyle Busch.
- Robby Gordon was fined a total of $35,000, docked 50 points and was also placed on probation for the balance of the season for calling Waltrip a "piece of s**t" on the post-race live interview on TNT and for throwing his helmet at Waltrip's car; the 50-point penalty covered both charges at 25 points each. Waltrip was also fined $10,000 and docked 25 points for using what seemed to be an obscene gesture, but after review of video on appeal, there was no obscene gesture and the penalty was overturned.
- Brian Vickers was fined $15,000 and docked 25 points for failing post-race inspection, unrelated to incidents above.

== Standings after the race ==
Drivers' Championship standings

	Pos	Driver	Points
	1	Tony Stewart	5,230
	2	Greg Biffle	5,210 (-20)
6	3	Ryan Newman	5,190 (-40)
	3	Rusty Wallace	5,190 (–40)
4	5	Matt Kenseth	5,180 (–50)
2	6	Jimmie Johnson	5,177 (–53)
1	7	Mark Martin	5,176 (–54)
1	8	Jeremy Mayfield	5,135 (–95)
1	9	Carl Edwards	5,121 (–109)
5	10	Kurt Busch	5,088 (–142)
Official driver's standings

- Note: Only the first 10 positions are included for the driver standings.

Previous race: 2005 Chevy Rock and Roll 400	Nextel Cup Series; 2005 season	Next race: 2005 MBNA NASCAR RacePoints 400
