= 2004 Food City 500 =

Race details
- Race 6 of 36 in the 2004 NASCAR Nextel Cup Series
- The 2004 Food City 500 program cover.
- Date: March 28, 2004
- Official name: 44th Annual Food City 500
- Location: Bristol, Tennessee, Bristol Motor Speedway
- Course: Permanent racing facility
- Course length: 0.533 miles (0.858 km)
- Distance: 500 laps, 266.5 mi (428.89 km)
- Scheduled distance: 500 laps, 266.5 mi (428.89 km)
- Average speed: 82.607 miles per hour (132.943 km/h)
- Attendance: 160,000

Pole position
Driver	Ryan Newman	Penske-Jasper Racing
- Time: 14.954

Most laps led
Driver	Kurt Busch	Roush Racing
- Laps: 119

Winner
No. 97	Kurt Busch	Roush Racing

Television in the United States
- Network: FOX
- Announcers: Mike Joy, Larry McReynolds, Darrell Waltrip

Radio in the United States
- Radio: Performance Racing Network

The 2004 Food City 500 was the sixth stock car race of the 2004 NASCAR Nextel Cup Series season and the 44th iteration of the event. The race was held on Sunday, March 28, 2004, before a crowd of 160,000 in Bristol, Tennessee at Bristol Motor Speedway, a 0.533 miles (0.858 km) permanent oval-shaped racetrack. The race took the scheduled 500 laps to complete. Kurt Busch of Roush Racing would hold off the field on the final restart with two to go to win his ninth career Nextel Cup Series win and his first of the season. To fill out the podium, Rusty Wallace of Penske-Jasper Racing finished 2nd and Kevin Harvick of Richard Childress Racing finished 3rd.

== Background ==
The layout of Bristol Motor Speedway, the venue where the race was held.

The Bristol Motor Speedway, formerly known as Bristol International Raceway and Bristol Raceway, is a NASCAR short track venue located in Bristol, Tennessee. Constructed in 1960, it held its first NASCAR race on July 30, 1961. Despite its short length, Bristol is among the most popular tracks on the NASCAR schedule because of its distinct features, which include extraordinarily steep banking, an all concrete surface, two pit roads, and stadium-like seating. It has also been named one of the loudest NASCAR tracks.

=== Entry list ===
#	Driver	Team	Make
0	Ward Burton	Haas CNC Racing	Chevrolet
01	Joe Nemechek	MBV Motorsports	Chevrolet
2	Rusty Wallace	Penske-Jasper Racing	Dodge
02	Hermie Sadler	SCORE Motorsports	Pontiac
4	Kevin Lepage	Morgan–McClure Motorsports	Chevrolet
5	Terry Labonte	Hendrick Motorsports	Chevrolet
6	Mark Martin	Roush Racing	Ford
8	Dale Earnhardt Jr.	Dale Earnhardt, Inc.	Chevrolet
9	Kasey Kahne	Evernham Motorsports	Dodge
09	Joe Ruttman	Phoenix Racing	Dodge
10	Scott Riggs	MBV Motorsports	Chevrolet
12	Ryan Newman	Penske-Jasper Racing	Dodge
15	Michael Waltrip	Dale Earnhardt, Inc.	Chevrolet
16	Greg Biffle	Roush Racing	Ford
17	Matt Kenseth	Roush Racing	Ford
18	Bobby Labonte	Joe Gibbs Racing	Chevrolet
19	Jeremy Mayfield	Evernham Motorsports	Dodge
20	Tony Stewart	Joe Gibbs Racing	Chevrolet
21	Ricky Rudd	Wood Brothers Racing	Ford
22	Scott Wimmer	Bill Davis Racing	Dodge
24	Jeff Gordon	Hendrick Motorsports	Chevrolet
25	Brian Vickers	Hendrick Motorsports	Chevrolet
29	Kevin Harvick	Richard Childress Racing	Chevrolet
30	Johnny Sauter	Richard Childress Racing	Chevrolet
31	Robby Gordon	Richard Childress Racing	Chevrolet
32	Ricky Craven	PPI Motorsports	Chevrolet
38	Elliott Sadler	Robert Yates Racing	Ford
40	Sterling Marlin	Chip Ganassi Racing	Dodge
41	Casey Mears	Chip Ganassi Racing	Dodge
42	Jamie McMurray	Chip Ganassi Racing	Dodge
43	Jeff Green	Petty Enterprises	Dodge
45	Kyle Petty	Petty Enterprises	Dodge
48	Jimmie Johnson	Hendrick Motorsports	Chevrolet
49	Ken Schrader	BAM Racing	Dodge
50	Derrike Cope	Arnold Motorsports	Dodge
72	Kirk Shelmerdine	Kirk Shelmerdine Racing	Ford
77	Brendan Gaughan	Penske-Jasper Racing	Dodge
80	Andy Hillenburg	Hover Motorsports	Ford
88	Dale Jarrett	Robert Yates Racing	Ford
89	Morgan Shepherd	Shepherd Racing Ventures	Dodge
94	Stanton Barrett	W. W. Motorsports	Chevrolet
97	Kurt Busch	Roush Racing	Ford
98	Geoff Bodine	Mach 1 Motorsports	Ford
99	Jeff Burton	Roush Racing	Ford
Official entry list

== Practice ==
=== First practice ===
The first practice session occurred on Friday, March 26, at 11:20 AM EST and would last for two hours. Jeff Gordon of Hendrick Motorsports would set the fastest time in the session, with a lap of 15.009 and an average speed of 127.843 miles per hour (205.743 km/h).

Pos.	#	Driver	Team	Make	Time	Speed
1	24	Jeff Gordon	Hendrick Motorsports	Chevrolet	15.009	127.843
2	8	Dale Earnhardt Jr.	Dale Earnhardt, Inc.	Chevrolet	15.040	127.580
3	16	Greg Biffle	Roush Racing	Ford	15.054	127.461
Full first practice results

=== Second practice ===
The second practice session occurred on Saturday, March 27, at 9:30 AM EST and would last for 45 minutes. Dale Earnhardt Jr. of Dale Earnhardt, Inc. would set the fastest time in the session, with a lap of 15.447 and an average speed of 124.218 miles per hour (199.909 km/h).

Pos.	#	Driver	Team	Make	Time	Speed
1	8	Dale Earnhardt Jr.	Dale Earnhardt, Inc.	Chevrolet	15.447	124.218
2	9	Kasey Kahne	Evernham Motorsports	Dodge	15.473	124.010
3	20	Tony Stewart	Joe Gibbs Racing	Chevrolet	15.486	123.905
Full second practice results

=== Third and final practice ===
The third and final practice session, sometimes referred to as Happy Hour, occurred on Saturday, March 27, at 11:10 AM EST and would last for 45 minutes. Brian Vickers of Hendrick Motorsports would set the fastest time in the session, with a lap of 15.604 and an average speed of 122.968 miles per hour (197.898 km/h).

Pos.	#	Driver	Team	Make	Time	Speed
1	25	Brian Vickers	Hendrick Motorsports	Chevrolet	15.604	122.968
2	22	Scott Wimmer	Bill Davis Racing	Dodge	15.607	122.945
3	97	Kurt Busch	Roush Racing	Ford	15.608	122.937
Full final practice results

== Qualifying ==
Qualifying occurred on Friday, March 27, at 3:00 PM EST. Each driver would have two laps to set a fastest time; the fastest of the two would count as their official qualifying lap. Positions 1-38 would be decided on time, while positions 39-43 would be based on provisionals. Four spots are awarded by the use of provisionals based on owner's points. The fifth is awarded to a past champion who has not otherwise qualified for the race. If no past champ needs the provisional, the next team in the owner points will be awarded a provisional.

Ryan Newman of Penske-Jasper Racing would win the pole, setting a time of 14.954 and an average speed of 128.314 miles per hour (206.501 km/h).

Kirk Shelmerdine would crash on his second lap in turn 3, slamming the outside wall. While he had set a lap, he was forced to use a provisional.

Morgan Shepherd would be the only driver to not qualify for the race.

=== Full qualifying results ===
Pos.	#	Driver	Team	Make	Time	Speed
1	12	Ryan Newman	Penske-Jasper Racing	Dodge	14.954	128.314
2	24	Jeff Gordon	Hendrick Motorsports	Chevrolet	14.957	128.288
3	16	Greg Biffle	Roush Racing	Ford	14.970	128.176
4	2	Rusty Wallace	Penske-Jasper Racing	Dodge	14.982	128.074
5	9	Kasey Kahne	Evernham Motorsports	Dodge	15.007	127.860
6	42	Jamie McMurray	Chip Ganassi Racing	Dodge	15.046	127.529
7	77	Brendan Gaughan	Penske-Jasper Racing	Dodge	15.064	127.377
8	15	Michael Waltrip	Dale Earnhardt, Inc.	Chevrolet	15.108	127.006
9	38	Elliott Sadler	Robert Yates Racing	Ford	15.116	126.938
10	30	Johnny Sauter	Richard Childress Racing	Chevrolet	15.126	126.854
11	48	Jimmie Johnson	Hendrick Motorsports	Chevrolet	15.147	126.679
12	20	Tony Stewart	Joe Gibbs Racing	Chevrolet	15.157	126.595
13	97	Kurt Busch	Roush Racing	Ford	15.160	126.570
14	29	Kevin Harvick	Richard Childress Racing	Chevrolet	15.162	126.553
15	21	Ricky Rudd	Wood Brothers Racing	Ford	15.172	126.470
16	19	Jeremy Mayfield	Evernham Motorsports	Dodge	15.186	126.353
17	40	Sterling Marlin	Chip Ganassi Racing	Dodge	15.195	126.278
18	8	Dale Earnhardt Jr.	Dale Earnhardt, Inc.	Chevrolet	15.196	126.270
19	49	Ken Schrader	BAM Racing	Dodge	15.197	126.262
20	22	Scott Wimmer	Bill Davis Racing	Dodge	15.204	126.204
21	6	Mark Martin	Roush Racing	Ford	15.208	126.170
22	25	Brian Vickers	Hendrick Motorsports	Chevrolet	15.227	126.013
23	17	Matt Kenseth	Roush Racing	Ford	15.236	125.939
24	41	Casey Mears	Chip Ganassi Racing	Dodge	15.237	125.930
25	32	Ricky Craven	PPI Motorsports	Chevrolet	15.242	125.889
26	01	Joe Nemechek	MBV Motorsports	Chevrolet	15.285	125.535
27	18	Bobby Labonte	Joe Gibbs Racing	Chevrolet	15.291	125.486
28	10	Scott Riggs	MBV Motorsports	Chevrolet	15.294	125.461
29	43	Jeff Green	Petty Enterprises	Dodge	15.304	125.379
30	88	Dale Jarrett	Robert Yates Racing	Ford	15.314	125.297
31	99	Jeff Burton	Roush Racing	Ford	15.314	125.297
32	31	Robby Gordon	Richard Childress Racing	Chevrolet	15.315	125.289
33	5	Terry Labonte	Hendrick Motorsports	Chevrolet	15.348	125.020
34	98	Geoff Bodine	Mach 1 Motorsports	Ford	15.371	124.832
35	4	Kevin Lepage	Morgan–McClure Motorsports	Chevrolet	15.379	124.768
36	45	Kyle Petty	Petty Enterprises	Dodge	15.439	124.283
37	50	Derrike Cope	Arnold Motorsports	Dodge	15.492	123.857
38	94	Stanton Barrett	W. W. Motorsports	Chevrolet	15.501	123.786
Provisionals
39	0	Ward Burton	Haas CNC Racing	Chevrolet	-	-
40	09	Joe Ruttman	Phoenix Racing	Dodge	15.717	122.084
41	72	Kirk Shelmerdine	Kirk Shelmerdine Racing	Ford	16.599	115.597
42	02	Hermie Sadler	SCORE Motorsports	Pontiac	15.622	122.827
43	80	Andy Hillenburg	Hover Motorsports	Ford	17.313	110.830
Failed to qualify
44	89	Morgan Shepherd	Shepherd Racing Ventures	Dodge	15.639	122.693
Official qualifying results

== Race results ==
Fin	St	#	Driver	Team	Make	Laps	Led	Status	Pts	Winnings
1	13	97	Kurt Busch	Roush Racing	Ford	500	119	running	190	$173,965
2	4	2	Rusty Wallace	Penske-Jasper Racing	Dodge	500	100	running	175	$141,878
3	14	29	Kevin Harvick	Richard Childress Racing	Chevrolet	500	0	running	165	$131,978
4	17	40	Sterling Marlin	Chip Ganassi Racing	Dodge	500	72	running	165	$135,125
5	23	17	Matt Kenseth	Roush Racing	Ford	500	0	running	155	$136,098
6	19	49	Ken Schrader	BAM Racing	Dodge	500	0	running	150	$77,945
7	1	12	Ryan Newman	Penske-Jasper Racing	Dodge	500	25	running	151	$124,862
8	6	42	Jamie McMurray	Chip Ganassi Racing	Dodge	500	0	running	117	$87,095
9	2	24	Jeff Gordon	Hendrick Motorsports	Chevrolet	500	0	running	138	$120,168
10	8	15	Michael Waltrip	Dale Earnhardt, Inc.	Chevrolet	500	0	running	134	$110,796
11	18	8	Dale Earnhardt Jr.	Dale Earnhardt, Inc.	Chevrolet	500	91	running	110	$118,748
12	3	16	Greg Biffle	Roush Racing	Ford	500	58	running	132	$84,890
13	20	22	Scott Wimmer	Bill Davis Racing	Dodge	500	0	running	124	$102,440
14	9	38	Elliott Sadler	Robert Yates Racing	Ford	500	0	running	121	$103,273
15	10	30	Johnny Sauter	Richard Childress Racing	Chevrolet	500	1	running	123	$83,090
16	11	48	Jimmie Johnson	Hendrick Motorsports	Chevrolet	500	8	running	120	$90,215
17	16	19	Jeremy Mayfield	Evernham Motorsports	Dodge	500	0	running	112	$96,565
18	33	5	Terry Labonte	Hendrick Motorsports	Chevrolet	500	0	running	109	$100,065
19	32	31	Robby Gordon	Richard Childress Racing	Chevrolet	500	1	running	111	$104,792
20	7	77	Brendan Gaughan	Penske-Jasper Racing	Dodge	500	0	running	103	$81,900
21	30	88	Dale Jarrett	Robert Yates Racing	Ford	500	0	running	100	$104,557
22	25	32	Ricky Craven	PPI Motorsports	Chevrolet	499	0	running	97	$93,390
23	21	6	Mark Martin	Roush Racing	Ford	499	0	running	94	$81,045
24	12	20	Tony Stewart	Joe Gibbs Racing	Chevrolet	498	25	running	96	$115,518
25	36	45	Kyle Petty	Petty Enterprises	Dodge	498	0	running	88	$82,570
26	37	50	Derrike Cope	Arnold Motorsports	Dodge	497	0	running	85	$68,440
27	26	01	Joe Nemechek	MBV Motorsports	Chevrolet	496	0	running	82	$87,694
28	39	0	Ward Burton	Haas CNC Racing	Chevrolet	496	0	running	79	$71,150
29	29	43	Jeff Green	Petty Enterprises	Dodge	496	0	running	76	$94,285
30	35	4	Kevin Lepage	Morgan–McClure Motorsports	Chevrolet	495	0	running	73	$70,685
31	42	02	Hermie Sadler	SCORE Motorsports	Pontiac	490	0	running	70	$66,890
32	38	94	Stanton Barrett	W. W. Motorsports	Chevrolet	453	0	crash	67	$66,845
33	27	18	Bobby Labonte	Joe Gibbs Racing	Chevrolet	428	0	running	64	$112,808
34	28	10	Scott Riggs	MBV Motorsports	Chevrolet	404	0	crash	61	$91,922
35	22	25	Brian Vickers	Hendrick Motorsports	Chevrolet	377	0	running	58	$74,690
36	24	41	Casey Mears	Chip Ganassi Racing	Dodge	331	0	running	55	$66,645
37	15	21	Ricky Rudd	Wood Brothers Racing	Ford	166	0	crash	52	$92,666
38	31	99	Jeff Burton	Roush Racing	Ford	138	0	too slow	49	$99,977
39	34	98	Geoff Bodine	Mach 1 Motorsports	Ford	59	0	brakes	46	$66,505
40	5	9	Kasey Kahne	Evernham Motorsports	Dodge	57	0	crash	43	$96,315
41	41	72	Kirk Shelmerdine	Kirk Shelmerdine Racing	Ford	7	0	handling	40	$66,390
42	40	09	Joe Ruttman	Phoenix Racing	Dodge	4	0	rear end	37	$66,335
43	43	80	Andy Hillenburg	Hover Motorsports	Ford	4	0	brakes	34	$65,656
Failed to qualify
44		89	Morgan Shepherd	Shepherd Racing Ventures	Dodge					
Official race results

Previous race: 2004 Carolina Dodge Dealers 400	NASCAR Nextel Cup Series; 2004 season	Next race: 2004 Samsung/Radio Shack 500
