= 2004 NASCAR Nextel Cup Series =

American motorsport season

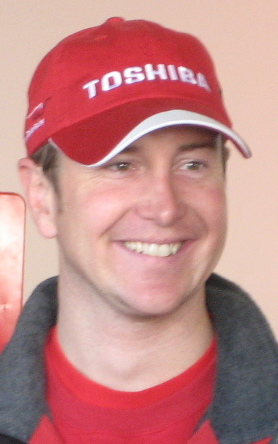
Kurt Busch, driving the No. 97 car, won the 2004 Nextel Cup Series championship.

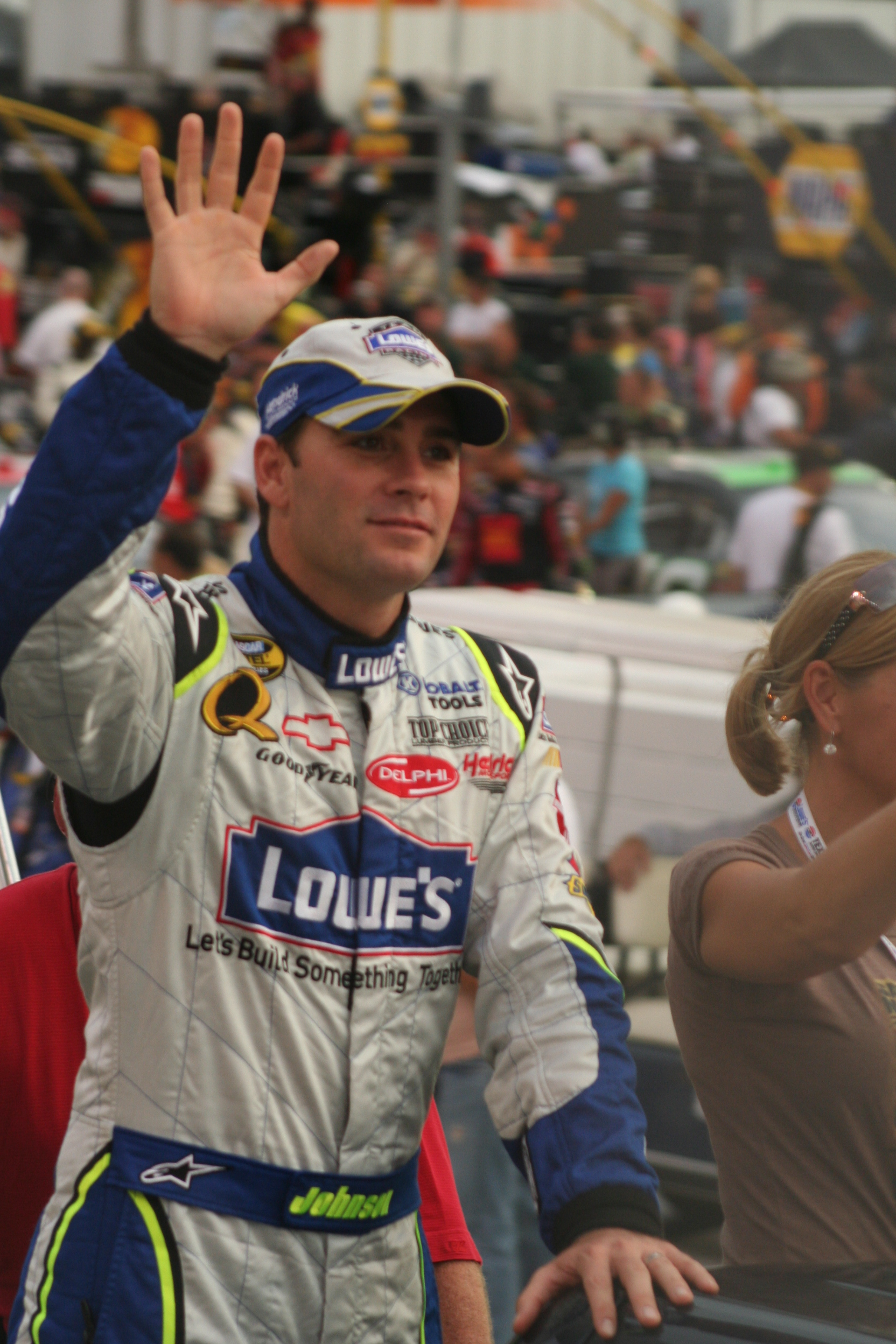
Jimmie Johnson came in second behind Busch by 8 points.

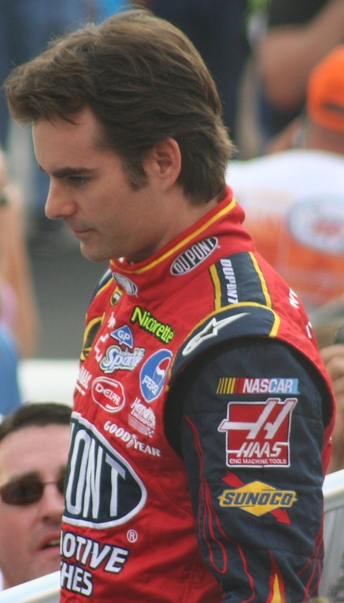
Jeff Gordon came in third behind Busch by 16 points.

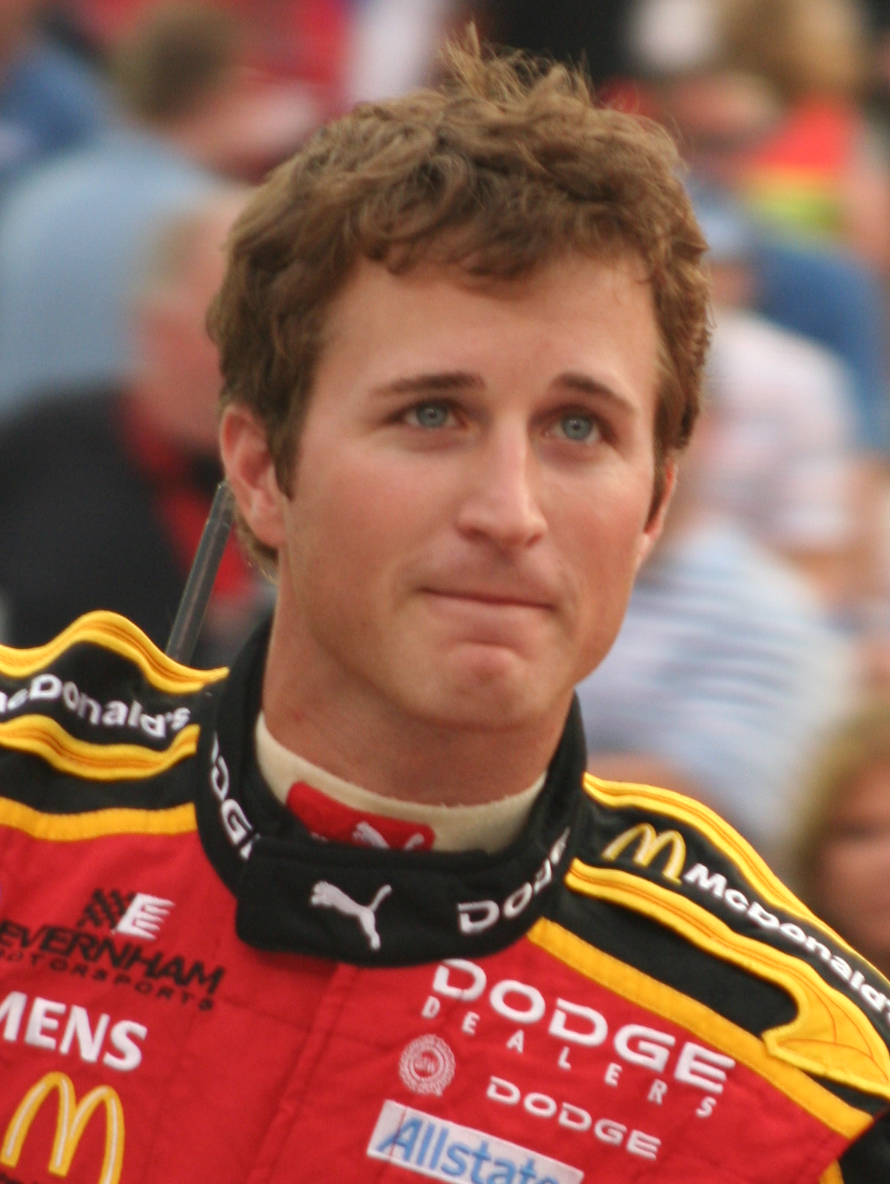
Kasey Kahne, the 2004 NASCAR Rookie of the Year.

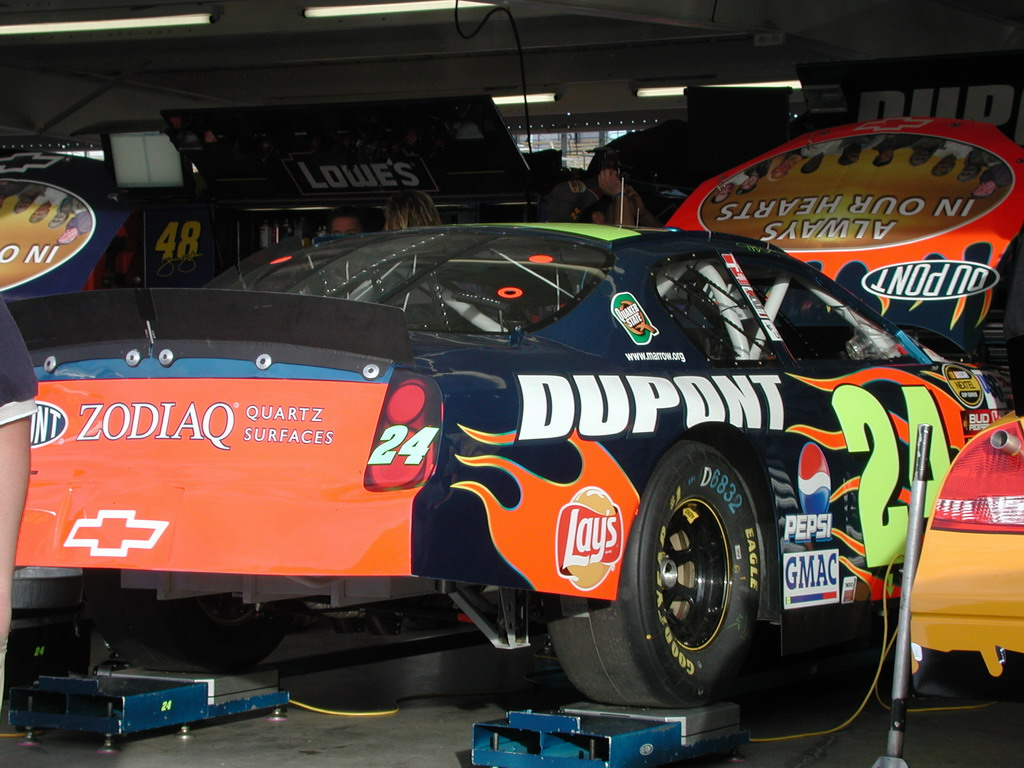
Chevrolet won the Manufacturer's championship with 22 wins.

The 2004 NASCAR Nextel Cup Series was the 56th season of NASCAR Nextel Cup Series in the United States and the 33rd modern-era Cup series season. The season began on Saturday, February 7, and ended on Sunday, November 21. Kurt Busch, who drove a Ford for Roush Racing, was the Nextel Cup champion.

This was the first season that NASCAR utilized the Chase for the Nextel Cup format that began with the Sylvania 300 on Sunday, September 19. Under the format rules, the top 10 drivers (and any additional drivers within 400 points of the leader) by the end of the 26th race would be eligible to compete in a final 10-race playoff to determine the NASCAR Nextel Cup champion. Following the 26th race, the eligible drivers would have their points reset to bring the drivers closer together in the standings, with only five points separating each driver. The season would then continue as normal, with the driver with the most points at the end of the season becoming the champion.

The NASCAR Manufacturers' Championship was won by Chevrolet when they captured 26 wins and 266 points. Ford finished in second place with 10 wins, and 224 points, while Dodge followed in third with 4 wins and 194 points.

This was the first year for the new series sponsorship. Mobile phone provider Nextel assumed sponsorship of the NASCAR championship series from cigarette brand Winston. Winston was the title sponsor of the Cup Series for 33 seasons, from 1971 to 2003. Nextel would become only the second title sponsor in Cup Series history. This was also the first year for Sunoco as it replaced Unocal 76 Brand as the official fuel of NASCAR. Sunoco would become only the second gas company to be NASCAR's official fuel since Unocal had been the official fuel since the sport's inception in 1948.

The season was also marked by tragedy. On October 24, a charter airplane owned by Hendrick Motorsports crashed at Bull Mountain in the Blue Ridge Mountains of Virginia, near Martinsville Speedway. Ten people aboard the plane died, including four relatives of team owner Rick Hendrick, as well as Randy Dorton, Hendrick's chief engine builder. Jimmie Johnson, a Hendrick driver, had won the race, but the post-race victory ceremony was canceled as words spread of the incident.

== Teams and drivers ==
=== Full-time schedule ===
There were 37 teams that attempted every race in 2004.

Manufacturer	Team	No.	Driver	Crew chief
Chevrolet	Dale Earnhardt, Inc.	8	Dale Earnhardt Jr.	Tony Eury
Chevrolet	Dale Earnhardt, Inc.	15	Michael Waltrip	Slugger Labbe
Chevrolet	Haas CNC Racing	0	Ward Burton 34	Bootie Barker
Chevrolet	Haas CNC Racing	0	Mike Bliss 2	Bootie Barker
Chevrolet	Hendrick Motorsports	5	Terry Labonte	Jim Long
Chevrolet	Hendrick Motorsports	24	Jeff Gordon	Robbie Loomis
Chevrolet	Hendrick Motorsports	25	Brian Vickers (R)	Peter Sospenzo
Chevrolet	Hendrick Motorsports	48	Jimmie Johnson	Chad Knaus
Chevrolet	Joe Gibbs Racing	18	Bobby Labonte	Michael McSwain 18; Brandon Thomas 18
Chevrolet	Joe Gibbs Racing	20	Tony Stewart	Greg Zipadelli
Chevrolet	MBV Motorsports	01	Joe Nemechek	Ryan Pemberton
Chevrolet	MBV Motorsports	10	Scott Riggs (R)	Doug Randolph
Chevrolet	Morgan-McClure Motorsports	4	Kevin Lepage 7	Chris Carrier
Chevrolet	Morgan-McClure Motorsports	4	Jimmy Spencer 25	Chris Carrier
Chevrolet	Morgan-McClure Motorsports	4	Mike Wallace 4	Chris Carrier
Chevrolet	PPI Motorsports	32	Ricky Craven 25	Harold Holly
Chevrolet	PPI Motorsports	32	Bobby Hamilton Jr. 11	Harold Holly
Chevrolet	Richard Childress Racing	29	Kevin Harvick	Todd Berrier
Chevrolet	Richard Childress Racing	30	Johnny Sauter 13	Kevin Hamlin
Chevrolet	Richard Childress Racing	30	Dave Blaney 8	Kevin Hamlin
Chevrolet	Richard Childress Racing	30	Jim Inglebright 1	Kevin Hamlin
Chevrolet	Richard Childress Racing	30	Jeff Burton 14	Kevin Hamlin
Chevrolet	Richard Childress Racing	31	Robby Gordon	Chris Andrews
Dodge	BAM Racing	49	Ken Schrader	David Hyder
Dodge	Bill Davis Racing	22	Scott Wimmer (R)	Frank Stoddard
Dodge	Chip Ganassi Racing	40	Sterling Marlin	Tony Glover
Dodge	Chip Ganassi Racing	41	Casey Mears	Jimmy Elledge
Dodge	Chip Ganassi Racing	42	Jamie McMurray	Donnie Wingo
Dodge	Evernham Motorsports	9	Kasey Kahne (R)	Tommy Baldwin Jr.
Dodge	Evernham Motorsports	19	Jeremy Mayfield	Kenny Francis
Dodge	Penske-Jasper Racing	2	Rusty Wallace	Larry Carter
Dodge	Penske-Jasper Racing	12	Ryan Newman	Matt Borland
Dodge	Penske-Jasper Racing	77	Brendan Gaughan (R)	Shane Wilson
Dodge	Petty Enterprises	43	Jeff Green	Greg Steadman
Dodge	Petty Enterprises	45	Kyle Petty	Bill Henderson
Ford	Kirk Shelmerdine Racing	72	Kirk Shelmerdine 32	Phil Harris
Ford	Kirk Shelmerdine Racing	72	Tom Hubert 2	Phil Harris
Ford	Kirk Shelmerdine Racing	72	Ted Christopher 1	Phil Harris
Ford	Kirk Shelmerdine Racing	72	Brad Teague 1	Phil Harris
Ford	Robert Yates Racing	38	Elliott Sadler	Todd Parrott
Ford	Robert Yates Racing	88	Dale Jarrett	Mike Ford
Ford	Roush Racing	6	Mark Martin	Pat Tryson
Ford	Roush Racing	16	Greg Biffle	Doug Richert
Ford	Roush Racing	17	Matt Kenseth	Robbie Reiser
Ford	Roush Racing	97	Kurt Busch	Jimmy Fennig
Ford	Roush Racing	99	Jeff Burton 22	Bob Osbourne
Ford	Roush Racing	99	Carl Edwards (R) 13	Bob Osbourne
Ford	Roush Racing	99	Dave Blaney 1	Bob Osbourne
Ford	Wood Brothers Racing	21	Ricky Rudd	Ben Leslie 22; Michael McSwain 14

=== Limited schedule ===
Manufacturer	Team	No.	Driver	Crew Chief	Rounds
Chevrolet	Bill McAnally Racing	61	Austin Cameron	Doug George	1
Chevrolet	Brewco Motorsports	27	David Green		1
Chevrolet	Competitive Edge Motorsports	51	Kevin Lepage		9
Chevrolet	Competitive Edge Motorsports	51	Tony Raines		7
Chevrolet	Conely Racing	79	Stan Boyd		2
Chevrolet	Dale Earnhardt, Inc.	1	John Andretti	Pete Rondeau	6
Chevrolet	Dale Earnhardt, Inc.	1	Ron Fellows	Pete Rondeau	1
Chevrolet	Dale Earnhardt, Inc.	1	Martin Truex Jr.	Pete Rondeau	3
Chevrolet	Dale Earnhardt, Inc.	1	Kenny Wallace	Pete Rondeau	1
Chevrolet	Gary Keller Racing	35	Mike Wallace		4
Chevrolet	Gary Keller Racing	35	Kenny Hendrick		1
Chevrolet	GIC-Mixon Motorsports	93	Geoff Bodine		2
Chevrolet	Haas CNC Racing	60	Jason Leffler		1
Chevrolet	Hendrick Motorsports	84	Kyle Busch	Gary DeHart	9
Chevrolet	Hollenbeck Motorsports	62	Larry Hollenbeck		2
Chevrolet	Joe Gibbs Racing	11	J. J. Yeley	Doug Hewitt	4
Chevrolet	Joe Gibbs Racing	11	Ricky Craven	Doug Hewitt	1
Chevrolet	Joe Gibbs Racing	80	Mike Bliss	Doug Hewitt	2
Chevrolet	Richard Childress Racing	33	Mike Skinner	Gil Martin 8 Bobby Leslie 1	1
Chevrolet	Richard Childress Racing	33	Kerry Earnhardt	Gil Martin 8 Bobby Leslie 1	6
Chevrolet	Richard Childress Racing	33	Johnny Sauter	Gil Martin 8 Bobby Leslie 1	2
Chevrolet	MB2 Motorsports	36	Boris Said		4
Chevrolet	Michael Waltrip Racing	00	Kenny Wallace		8
Chevrolet	McGlynn Racing	00	Carl Long		5
Chevrolet	McGlynn Racing	00	Ryan McGlynn		5
Chevrolet	McGlynn Racing	08	Ryan McGlynn		1
Chevrolet	McGlynn Racing	08	Carl Long		1
Chevrolet	Morgan-McClure Motorsports	04	Eric McClure		2
Dodge	Arnold Motorsports	50	Derrike Cope	Mike Hillman	12
Dodge	Arnold Motorsports	50	Mike Wallace	Mike Hillman	3
Dodge	Arnold Motorsports	50	P. J. Jones	Mike Hillman	5
Dodge	Arnold Motorsports	50	Todd Bodine	Mike Hillman	12
Dodge	Arnold Motorsports	50	Jeff Fuller	Mike Hillman	3
Dodge	BAM Racing	59	Klaus Graf		3
Dodge	BAM Racing	59	Larry Foyt		2
Dodge	BAM Racing	70	Larry Foyt		1
Dodge	Bill Davis Racing	23	Dave Blaney		6
Dodge	Bill Davis Racing	23	Tony Raines		2
Dodge	Bill Davis Racing	23	Shane Hmiel		5
Dodge	Evernham Motorsports	91	Bill Elliott	Sammy Johns	3
Dodge	Chip Ganassi Racing	39	Scott Pruett		2
Dodge	Gary Trout Autosports	34	Geoff Bodine		1
Dodge	Glenn Racing	46	Carl Long		5
Dodge	Haefele Racing	75	Mike Garvey		5
Dodge	Penske-Jasper Racing	06	Chad Blount	Roy McCauley	1
Dodge	Penske-Jasper Racing	06	Travis Kvapil	Roy McCauley	4
Dodge	Phoenix Racing	09	Johnny Benson	Jerry Pitts	4
Dodge	Phoenix Racing	09	Joe Ruttman	Jerry Pitts	7
Dodge	Phoenix Racing	09	Bobby Hamilton Jr.	Jerry Pitts	6
Dodge	Phoenix Racing	09	Tony Raines	Jerry Pitts	1
Dodge	Phoenix Racing	09	Scott Pruett	Jerry Pitts	1
Dodge	Phoenix Racing	09	Mike Wallace	Jerry Pitts	4
Dodge	Phoenix Racing	09	Johnny Sauter	Jerry Pitts	5
Dodge	R&J Racing	37	Todd Bodine	Billy Poindexter	4
Dodge	R&J Racing	37	Chad Blount	Billy Poindexter	2
Dodge	R&J Racing	37	Kevin Lepage	Billy Poindexter	12
Dodge	R&J Racing	37	Andy Hillenburg	Billy Poindexter	2
Dodge	R&J Racing	37	Stanton Barrett	Billy Poindexter	1
Dodge	Sacks Motorsports	13	Greg Sacks		11
Dodge	Shepherd Racing Ventures	89	Morgan Shepherd	Troy Kelly 14; Darin Kummrow 17; Terry Allen 2	32
Dodge	Ultra Motorsports	7	Jimmy Spencer	Bob Temple	1
Dodge	Ultra Motorsports	7	Dave Blaney	Bob Temple	1
Dodge	Ultra Motorsports	7	Steve Park	Bob Temple	1
Dodge	Ware Racing Enterprises	52	Stanton Barrett		2
Dodge	A. J. Foyt Enterprises	14	Larry Foyt	Keith Koppenal 4 Dave Charpentier 5	4
Ford	ppc Racing	14	John Andretti	Keith Koppenal 4 Dave Charpentier 5	5
Ford	Donlavey Racing	90	Andy Hillenburg	Junie Donlavey	1
Ford	Donlavey Racing	90	Kevin Ray	Junie Donlavey	1
Ford	Donlavey Racing	90	A. J. Henriksen	Junie Donlavey	1
Ford	Front Row Motorsports	92	Brad Teague		1
Ford	Front Row Motorsports	92	Tony Raines		1
Ford	Front Row Motorsports	92	Stanton Barrett		1
Ford	Harrah Racing	78	Jeff Fultz		1
Ford	Hover Motorsports	80	Andy Hillenburg	Stan Hover	8
Ford	Hover Motorsports	80	Randy LaJoie	Stan Hover	1
Ford	Hover Motorsports	80	Carl Long	Stan Hover	4
Ford	Hover Motorsports	80	Tony Ave	Stan Hover	2
Ford	Hover Motorsports	80	Ted Christopher	Stan Hover	1
Ford	Hover Motorsports	80	Derrike Cope	Stan Hover	1
Ford	Hover Motorsports	80	Mario Gosselin	Stan Hover	3
Ford	Hover Motorsports	80	Andy Belmont	Stan Hover	1
Pontiac	Andy Belmont Racing	59	Andy Belmont		1
Dodge Ford	Mach 1 Motorsports	96	Larry Gunselman	Mike Steurer	1
Dodge Ford	Mach 1 Motorsports	96	Derrike Cope	Mike Steurer	1
Dodge Ford	Mach 1 Motorsports	96	Randy LaJoie	Mike Steurer	1
Dodge Ford	Mach 1 Motorsports	98	Larry Gunselman	Mike Steurer 31; Sammy Johns 3	6
Dodge Ford	Mach 1 Motorsports	98	Todd Bodine	Mike Steurer 31; Sammy Johns 3	10
Dodge Ford	Mach 1 Motorsports	98	Geoff Bodine	Mike Steurer 31; Sammy Johns 3	7
Dodge Ford	Mach 1 Motorsports	98	Bill Elliott	Mike Steurer 31; Sammy Johns 3	3
Dodge Ford	Mach 1 Motorsports	98	Derrike Cope	Mike Steurer 31; Sammy Johns 3	4
Dodge Ford	Mach 1 Motorsports	98	Chad Chaffin	Mike Steurer 31; Sammy Johns 3	1
Dodge Ford	Mach 1 Motorsports	98	Randy LaJoie	Mike Steurer 31; Sammy Johns 3	3
Chevrolet Ford Pontiac	SCORE Motorsports	02	Carl Long	Ernie Cope 27; Ed Ash 1 Jeff Buckner 3	1
Chevrolet Ford Pontiac	SCORE Motorsports	02	Andy Belmont	Ernie Cope 27; Ed Ash 1 Jeff Buckner 3	3
Chevrolet Ford Pontiac	SCORE Motorsports	02	Hermie Sadler	Ernie Cope 27; Ed Ash 1 Jeff Buckner 3	24
Chevrolet Ford Pontiac	SCORE Motorsports	02	Derrike Cope	Ernie Cope 27; Ed Ash 1 Jeff Buckner 3	1
Chevrolet Ford Pontiac	SCORE Motorsports	02	Brandon Ash	Ernie Cope 27; Ed Ash 1 Jeff Buckner 3	1
Chevrolet Ford Pontiac	SCORE Motorsports	02	Jason Jarrett	Ernie Cope 27; Ed Ash 1 Jeff Buckner 3	1
Chevrolet Dodge Ford	W. W. Motorsports	94	Stanton Barrett	Terry Allen	11
Chevrolet Dodge Ford	W. W. Motorsports	94	Derrike Cope	Terry Allen	4
Chevrolet Dodge Ford	W. W. Motorsports	94	Brad Teague	Terry Allen	1

== Schedule ==
No.	Race title	Track	Date
	Budweiser Shootout	Daytona International Speedway, Daytona Beach	February 7
	Gatorade Duels	Daytona International Speedway, Daytona Beach	February 12
1	Daytona 500	Daytona International Speedway, Daytona Beach	February 15
2	Subway 400	North Carolina Speedway, Rockingham	February 22
3	UAW-DaimlerChrysler 400	Las Vegas Motor Speedway, Las Vegas	March 7
4	Golden Corral 500	Atlanta Motor Speedway, Hampton	March 14
5	Carolina Dodge Dealers 400	Darlington Raceway, Darlington	March 21
6	Food City 500	Bristol Motor Speedway, Bristol	March 28
7	Samsung / RadioShack 500	Texas Motor Speedway, Fort Worth	April 4
8	Advance Auto Parts 500	Martinsville Speedway, Ridgeway	April 18
9	Aaron's 499	Talladega Superspeedway, Talladega	April 25
10	Auto Club 500	California Speedway, Fontana	May 2
11	Chevy American Revolution 400	Richmond International Raceway, Richmond	May 15
	Nextel Open	Lowe's Motor Speedway, Concord	May 22
	Nextel All-Star Challenge	Lowe's Motor Speedway, Concord	May 22
12	Coca-Cola 600	Lowe's Motor Speedway, Concord	May 30
13	MBNA America 400 "A Salute to Heroes"	Dover International Speedway, Dover	June 6
14	Pocono 500	Pocono Raceway, Long Pond	June 13
15	DHL 400	Michigan International Speedway, Brooklyn	June 20
16	Dodge/Save Mart 350	Infineon Raceway, Sonoma	June 27
17	Pepsi 400	Daytona International Speedway, Daytona Beach	July 3
18	Tropicana 400 presented by Meijer	Chicagoland Speedway, Joliet	July 11
19	Siemens 300	New Hampshire International Speedway, Loudon	July 25
20	Pennsylvania 500	Pocono Raceway, Long Pond	August 1
21	Brickyard 400	Indianapolis Motor Speedway, Speedway	August 8
22	Sirius Satellite Radio at The Glen	Watkins Glen International, Watkins Glen	August 15
23	GFS Marketplace 400	Michigan International Speedway, Brooklyn	August 22
24	Sharpie 500	Bristol Motor Speedway, Bristol	August 28
25	Pop Secret 500	California Speedway, Fontana	September 5
26	Chevy Rock & Roll 400	Richmond International Raceway, Richmond	September 11
Chase for the Nextel Cup
27	Sylvania 300	New Hampshire International Speedway, Loudon	September 19
28	MBNA America 400	Dover International Speedway, Dover	September 26
29	EA Sports 500	Talladega Superspeedway, Talladega	October 3
30	Banquet 400 presented by ConAgra Foods	Kansas Speedway, Kansas City	October 10
31	UAW-GM Quality 500	Lowe's Motor Speedway, Concord	October 16
32	Subway 500	Martinsville Speedway, Ridgeway	October 24
33	Bass Pro Shops MBNA 500	Atlanta Motor Speedway, Hampton	October 31
34	Checker Auto Parts 500	Phoenix International Raceway, Phoenix	November 7
35	Mountain Dew Southern 500	Darlington Raceway, Darlington	November 14
36	Ford 400	Homestead–Miami Speedway, Homestead	November 21

== Races ==
No.	Race	Pole position	Most laps led	Winning driver	Manufacturer
	Budweiser Shootout	Jeremy Mayfield	Terry Labonte	Dale Jarrett	Ford
	Gatorade 125 #1	Greg Biffle	Greg Biffle	Dale Earnhardt Jr.	Chevrolet
	Gatorade 125 #2	Elliott Sadler	Elliott Sadler	Elliott Sadler	Ford
1	Daytona 500	Greg Biffle	Tony Stewart	Dale Earnhardt Jr.	Chevrolet
2	Subway 400	Ryan Newman	Matt Kenseth	Matt Kenseth	Ford
3	UAW-Daimler Chrysler 400	Kasey Kahne	Matt Kenseth	Matt Kenseth	Ford
4	Golden Corral 500	Ryan Newman	Tony Stewart	Dale Earnhardt Jr.	Chevrolet
5	Carolina Dodge Dealers 400	Kasey Kahne	Kurt Busch	Jimmie Johnson	Chevrolet
6	Food City 500	Ryan Newman	Kurt Busch	Kurt Busch	Ford
7	Samsung/Radio Shack 500	Bobby Labonte	Kasey Kahne	Elliott Sadler	Ford
8	Advance Auto Parts 500	Jeff Gordon	Jeff Gordon	Rusty Wallace	Dodge
9	Aaron's 499	Ricky Rudd	Dale Earnhardt Jr.	Jeff Gordon	Chevrolet
10	Auto Club 500	Kasey Kahne	Jeff Gordon	Jeff Gordon	Chevrolet
11	Chevy American Revolution 400	Brian Vickers	Dale Earnhardt Jr.	Dale Earnhardt Jr.	Chevrolet
	Nextel Open	Dave Blaney	Jamie McMurray	Sterling Marlin	Dodge
	Nextel All-Star Challenge	Rusty Wallace	Ryan Newman	Matt Kenseth	Ford
12	Coca-Cola 600	Jimmie Johnson	Jimmie Johnson	Jimmie Johnson	Chevrolet
13	MBNA America 400 "A Salute to Heroes"	Jeremy Mayfield	Tony Stewart	Mark Martin	Ford
14	Pocono 500	Kasey Kahne	Jimmie Johnson	Jimmie Johnson	Chevrolet
15	DHL 400	Jeff Gordon	Jeff Gordon	Ryan Newman	Dodge
16	Dodge/Save Mart 350	Jeff Gordon	Jeff Gordon	Jeff Gordon	Chevrolet
17	Pepsi 400	Jeff Gordon	Jeff Gordon	Jeff Gordon	Chevrolet
18	Tropicana 400 presented by Meijer	Jeff Gordon	Tony Stewart	Tony Stewart	Chevrolet
19	Siemens 300	Ryan Newman	Ryan Newman	Kurt Busch	Ford
20	Pennsylvania 500	Casey Mears	Jimmie Johnson	Jimmie Johnson	Chevrolet
21	Brickyard 400	Casey Mears	Jeff Gordon	Jeff Gordon	Chevrolet
22	Sirius Satellite Radio at The Glen	Jimmie Johnson	Tony Stewart	Tony Stewart	Chevrolet
23	GFS Marketplace 400	Jimmie Johnson	Greg Biffle	Greg Biffle	Ford
24	Sharpie 500	Jeff Gordon	Dale Earnhardt Jr.	Dale Earnhardt Jr.	Chevrolet
25	Pop Secret 500	Brian Vickers	Mark Martin	Elliott Sadler	Ford
26	Chevy Rock & Roll 400	Ryan Newman	Jeremy Mayfield	Jeremy Mayfield	Dodge
27	Sylvania 300	Jeff Gordon	Kurt Busch	Kurt Busch	Ford
28	MBNA America 400	Jeremy Mayfield	Ryan Newman	Ryan Newman	Dodge
29	EA Sports 500	Joe Nemechek	Dale Earnhardt Jr.	Dale Earnhardt Jr.	Chevrolet
30	Banquet 400 presented by ConAgra Foods	Joe Nemechek	Jeremy Mayfield	Joe Nemechek	Chevrolet
31	UAW-GM Quality 500	Ryan Newman	Kasey Kahne	Jimmie Johnson	Chevrolet
32	Subway 500	Ryan Newman	Kurt Busch	Jimmie Johnson	Chevrolet
33	Bass Pro Shops MBNA 500	Ryan Newman	Mark Martin	Jimmie Johnson	Chevrolet
34	Checker Auto Parts 500	Ryan Newman	Dale Earnhardt Jr.	Dale Earnhardt Jr.	Chevrolet
35	Mountain Dew Southern 500	Kurt Busch	Jeff Gordon	Jimmie Johnson	Chevrolet
36	Ford 400	Kurt Busch	Greg Biffle	Greg Biffle	Ford

=== Budweiser Shootout ===
The exhibition Budweiser Shootout was held on February 7 at Daytona International Speedway. The starting lineup was decided by a random draw. Jeremy Mayfield drew the pole.

Top ten results

1. #88 - Dale Jarrett
2. #8 - Dale Earnhardt Jr.
3. #29 - Kevin Harvick
4. #6 - Mark Martin
5. #24 - Jeff Gordon
6. #2 - Rusty Wallace
7. #20 - Tony Stewart
8. #5 - Terry Labonte
9. #48 - Jimmie Johnson
10. #01 - Boris Said

=== Gatorade Twin 125s ===
The Gatorade 125s qualifying races for the Daytona 500 were held on February 12 at Daytona International Speedway.

Race one: top ten results

1. #8 - Dale Earnhardt Jr.
2. #20 - Tony Stewart
3. #42 - Jamie McMurray
4. #15 - Michael Waltrip
5. #99 - Jeff Burton
6. #18 - Bobby Labonte
7. #97 - Kurt Busch
8. #77 - Brendan Gaughan
9. #0 - Ward Burton
10. #30 - Johnny Sauter

Race two: top ten results

1. #38 - Elliott Sadler
2. #40 - Sterling Marlin
3. #48 - Jimmie Johnson
4. #6 - Mark Martin
5. #29 - Kevin Harvick
6. #17 - Matt Kenseth
7. #01 - Joe Nemechek
8. #21 - Ricky Rudd
9. #2 - Rusty Wallace
10. #12 - Ryan Newman

=== 46th Daytona 500 ===
The 46th running of the Daytona 500 was held on February 15. Greg Biffle won the pole.

Top ten results

1. #8 - Dale Earnhardt Jr.*
2. #20 - Tony Stewart
3. #22 - Scott Wimmer
4. #29 - Kevin Harvick
5. #48 - Jimmie Johnson
6. #01 - Joe Nemechek
7. #38 - Elliott Sadler
8. #24 - Jeff Gordon
9. #17 - Matt Kenseth
10. #88 - Dale Jarrett

Failed to qualify: Kirk Shelmerdine (#72), Andy Hillenburg (#90)

- Dale Earnhardt Jr. won in his 5th attempt. He also scored the win on February 15, 6 years to the day that his father, Dale Earnhardt, won his only Daytona 500 in his 20th attempt.

=== Subway 400 ===
The final Subway 400 was held on February 22 at North Carolina Speedway. Ryan Newman won the pole.

Top ten results

1. #17 - Matt Kenseth*
2. #9 - Kasey Kahne
3. #42 - Jamie McMurray
4. #40 - Sterling Marlin
5. #8 - Dale Earnhardt Jr.
6. #12 - Ryan Newman
7. #2 - Rusty Wallace
8. #97 - Kurt Busch
9. #0 - Ward Burton
10. #24 - Jeff Gordon - 2 laps down

Failed to qualify: none

- Matt Kenseth scored the victory in a photo finish, barely beating rookie Kasey Kahne by 0.01 seconds.
- This was the final NASCAR Cup race held at Rockingham, which was dropped from the 2005 NASCAR schedule following the Ferko lawsuit and declining attendance.
- During the race, Carl Long went for a wild tumble down the back straight and Robby Gordon was turned into the wall and got on his side.
- The race also became the beginning of the focus of the season-long field-filler controversy. Joe Ruttman arrived at the track without a pit crew for a start and park, Andy Hillenburg was involved in a crash after running slow, and Kirk Shelmerdine was black-flagged for failing to maintain a minimum speed. NASCAR added a mandate of a full pit crew in an attempt to stop start and parking.
- NASCAR also announced, in light of the Super Bowl XXXVIII halftime show controversy, at the drivers' meeting that a points penalty would also be assessed to anyone involved on a race team who uses inappropriate language. Previously, a fine had been assessed.

=== UAW-DaimlerChrysler 400 ===
The UAW-DaimlerChrysler 400 was held on March 7 at Las Vegas Motor Speedway. Kasey Kahne won the pole.

Top ten results

1. #17 - Matt Kenseth
2. #9 - Kasey Kahne
3. #20 - Tony Stewart
4. #42 - Jamie McMurray
5. #6 - Mark Martin
6. #38 - Elliott Sadler
7. #41 - Casey Mears
8. #18 - Bobby Labonte
9. #97 - Kurt Busch
10. #2 - Rusty Wallace

Failed to qualify: Larry Gunselman (#98)

- Kyle Busch made his Cup Series debut in this race, starting 18th and finishing 41st.

=== Golden Corral 500 ===
The Golden Corral 500 was held on March 14 at Atlanta Motor Speedway. Ryan Newman won the pole.

Top ten results

1. #8 - Dale Earnhardt Jr.
2. #19 - Jeremy Mayfield
3. #9 - Kasey Kahne
4. #48 - Jimmie Johnson
5. #12 - Ryan Newman
6. #17 - Matt Kenseth
7. #20 - Tony Stewart
8. #16 - Greg Biffle
9. #88 - Dale Jarrett
10. #24 - Jeff Gordon

Failed to qualify: Morgan Shepherd (#89)

=== Carolina Dodge Dealers 400 ===
The Carolina Dodge Dealers 400 was held on March 21 at Darlington Raceway. Kasey Kahne won the pole.

Top ten results

1. #48 - Jimmie Johnson
2. #18 - Bobby Labonte
3. #12 - Ryan Newman
4. #31 - Robby Gordon
5. #38 - Elliott Sadler
6. #97 - Kurt Busch
7. #6 - Mark Martin
8. #29 - Kevin Harvick
9. #19 - Jeremy Mayfield
10. #8 - Dale Earnhardt Jr.

Failed to qualify: Stanton Barrett (#94)

- This was the last 400-mile race held at Darlington until 2020.

=== Food City 500 ===
The Food City 500 was held on March 28 at Bristol Motor Speedway. Ryan Newman won the pole.

Top ten results

1. #97 - Kurt Busch*
2. #2 - Rusty Wallace
3. #29 - Kevin Harvick
4. #40 - Sterling Marlin
5. #17 - Matt Kenseth
6. #49 - Ken Schrader
7. #12 - Ryan Newman
8. #42 - Jamie McMurray*
9. #24 - Jeff Gordon
10. #15 - Michael Waltrip

Failed to qualify: Morgan Shepherd (#89), Larry Foyt (#14) - Withdrew

- Larry Foyt attempted the race with the #14 team but the car was confiscated by NASCAR for failing opening day inspection for a non-approved roof that did not fit the car templates which led the team to withdraw.
- This was Kurt Busch's fourth Cup Series victory in the last five Bristol races, including his third in a row, and third straight spring Bristol win.
- Dale Earnhardt Jr. was docked 25 driver points, fined $10,000, and placed on probation until June 1 for intentionally spinning himself out to force a caution.
- Jamie McMurray was fined $10,000 and placed on probation until August 31 after bumping Matt Kenseth in retaliation after the race ended.
- Hermie Sadler drove the #02 Pontiac in this race, marking the final ever race for Pontiac in the Cup Series.
- Dale Jarrett hit the wall with nearly five laps left. This Race was Red-flagged due to no overtime. The race restarted and Kurt Busch got his first win of the season.

=== Samsung/Radio Shack 500 ===
The Samsung/Radio Shack 500 was held on April 4 at Texas Motor Speedway. Bobby Labonte won the pole for the final time in his career.

Top ten results

1. #38 - Elliott Sadler
2. #9 - Kasey Kahne
3. #24 - Jeff Gordon
4. #8 - Dale Earnhardt Jr.
5. #2 - Rusty Wallace
6. #97 - Kurt Busch
7. #41 - Casey Mears
8. #20 - Tony Stewart
9. #48 - Jimmie Johnson
10. #42 - Jamie McMurray

Failed to qualify: Kyle Busch (#84), Morgan Shepherd (#89), Andy Hillenburg (#80), Andy Belmont (#02)

- Elliott Sadler edged out Kasey Kahne by a .028 of a second.
- This was the last race attempted for Pontiac in the series. Andy Belmont failed to make the race.

=== Advance Auto Parts 500 ===
The Advance Auto Parts 500 was held on April 18 at Martinsville Speedway. Jeff Gordon won the pole.

Top ten results

1. #2 - Rusty Wallace*
2. #18 - Bobby Labonte
3. #8 - Dale Earnhardt Jr.
4. #48 - Jimmie Johnson
5. #12 - Ryan Newman
6. #24 - Jeff Gordon*
7. #42 - Jamie McMurray
8. #17 - Matt Kenseth
9. #40 - Sterling Marlin
10. #88 - Dale Jarrett

Failed to qualify: Kirk Shelmerdine (#72)

- On lap 284, the concrete pavement in turn 3 broke up, creating a pothole. Jeff Gordon would run into the broken up part of the track, damaging his right-front fender. The race was red-flagged to repair the track, and while NASCAR would not grant the #24 team's request to be able to repair the car during the red flag, Gordon was able to fight back in the second half of the race for a sixth-place finish.
- Rusty Wallace broke a 106-race winless streak, dating back to Auto Club Speedway in April 2001.
- This would be Wallace's 55th and final career victory. With this win, he passed Lee Petty on the NASCAR win list.

=== Aaron's 499 ===
The Aaron's 499 was held on April 25 at Talladega Superspeedway. Ricky Rudd won the pole for the final time in his career.

Top ten results

1. #24 - Jeff Gordon*
2. #8 - Dale Earnhardt Jr.
3. #29 - Kevin Harvick
4. #48 - Jimmie Johnson
5. #31 - Robby Gordon
6. #6 - Mark Martin
7. #99 - Jeff Burton
8. #41 - Casey Mears
9. #42 - Jamie McMurray
10. #18 - Bobby Labonte

Failed to qualify: Larry Foyt (#14), Todd Bodine (#98), Kirk Shelmerdine (#72)

- The race ended under controversy when Brian Vickers crashed with four laps to go. At the same time, Jeff Gordon was about to be passed by Dale Earnhardt Jr. As Gordon's car was still ahead of Earnhardt Jr.'s, he kept the lead for the following caution. However, the race never was restarted, and Gordon won the race under the caution, prompting angered fans to throw beverage cups at his car while he celebrated his victory by doing doughnuts on the track. This led to the implementation of the green-white-checkered finish rule in order to avoid such situations in the future.
- This was Jeff Gordon's first restrictor plate win since this event in 2000.
- Gordon's win also ended Dale Earnhardt Incorporated's streak of Talladega victories at five, dating back to October 2001.

=== Auto Club 500 ===
The Auto Club 500 was held on May 2 at California Speedway. Kasey Kahne won the pole.

Top ten results

1. #24 - Jeff Gordon
2. #48 - Jimmie Johnson
3. #12 - Ryan Newman
4. #17 - Matt Kenseth
5. #18 - Bobby Labonte
6. #77 - Brendan Gaughan
7. #5 - Terry Labonte
8. #41 - Casey Mears
9. #29 - Kevin Harvick
10. #0 - Ward Burton

Failed to qualify: none

=== Chevy American Revolution 400 ===
The Chevy American Revolution 400 was held on May 15 at Richmond International Raceway. Brian Vickers won the pole.

Top ten results

1. #8 - Dale Earnhardt Jr.
2. #48 - Jimmie Johnson
3. #18 - Bobby Labonte
4. #20 - Tony Stewart
5. #17 - Matt Kenseth
6. #24 - Jeff Gordon
7. #6 - Mark Martin
8. #25 - Brian Vickers
9. #12 - Ryan Newman
10. #15 - Michael Waltrip

Failed to qualify: Stanton Barrett (#94), Kirk Shelmerdine (#72)

=== Nextel Open ===
The Nextel Open was held on May 22 at Lowe's Motor Speedway. Dave Blaney won the pole.

Top ten results

1. #40 - Sterling Marlin*
2. #19 - Jeremy Mayfield
3. #42 - Jamie McMurray
4. #43 - Jeff Green
5. #22 - Scott Wimmer
6. #30 - Johnny Sauter
7. #0 - Ward Burton
8. #23 - Dave Blaney
9. #49 - Ken Schrader*
10. #50 - Derrike Cope
- Sterling Marlin and Ken Schrader advanced to the All-Star Challenge after this race; Marlin for winning the race, and Schrader for winning the fan vote. Kerry Earnhardt had initially won the fan vote, but as he failed to finish the event, Schrader moved on instead.

=== Nextel All-Star Challenge ===
The Nextel All-Star Challenge was held on May 22 at Lowe's Motor Speedway. Rusty Wallace won the pole.

Top ten results

1. #17 - Matt Kenseth
2. #12 - Ryan Newman
3. #20 - Tony Stewart
4. #15 - Michael Waltrip
5. #8 - Dale Earnhardt Jr.
6. #24 - Jeff Gordon
7. #9 - Kasey Kahne
8. #38 - Elliott Sadler
9. #2 - Rusty Wallace
10. #6 - Mark Martin

=== Coca-Cola 600 ===
The Coca-Cola 600 was held on May 30 at Lowe's Motor Speedway. Jimmie Johnson won the pole.

Top ten results

1. #48 - Jimmie Johnson*
2. #15 - Michael Waltrip
3. #17 - Matt Kenseth
4. #42 - Jamie McMurray
5. #38 - Elliott Sadler
6. #8 - Dale Earnhardt Jr.
7. #41 - Casey Mears
8. #19 - Jeremy Mayfield
9. #20 - Tony Stewart
10. #2 - Rusty Wallace

Failed to qualify: Steve Park (#7), Todd Bodine (#37), Carl Long (#46), Stanton Barrett (#94), Geoff Bodine (#98), Morgan Shepherd (#89), Jeff Fultz (#78), Kirk Shelmerdine (#72), Andy Hillenburg (#80)

- Jimmie Johnson won this race in dominating fashion, as he led 334 of the race's 400 laps.

=== MBNA America 400 "A Salute to Heroes" ===
The MBNA America 400 "A Salute to Heroes" was held on June 6 at Dover International Speedway. Jeremy Mayfield won the pole.

Top ten results

1. #6 - Mark Martin*
2. #20 - Tony Stewart
3. #8 - Dale Earnhardt Jr.
4. #99 - Jeff Burton
5. #10 - Scott Riggs
6. #15 - Michael Waltrip 1 lap down
7. #5 - Terry Labonte 1 lap down
8. #19 - Jeremy Mayfield 1 lap down
9. #22 - Scott Wimmer 2 laps down
10. #29 - Kevin Harvick 2 laps down

Failed to qualify: Hermie Sadler (#02), Todd Bodine (#37), Larry Gunselman (#98)

- Martin's victory snapped a 73-race winless streak, dating back to Charlotte in May 2002.
- Kasey Kahne was leading late in the race, when his car drove through oil from Casey Mears' car. Kahne hit the wall hard, and finished the race in 21st.
- Only five cars finished on the lead lap.

=== Pocono 500 ===
The Pocono 500 was held on June 13 at Pocono Raceway. Kasey Kahne won the pole.

Top ten results

1. #48 - Jimmie Johnson
2. #19 - Jeremy Mayfield
3. #18 - Bobby Labonte
4. #24 - Jeff Gordon
5. #97 - Kurt Busch
6. #8 - Dale Earnhardt Jr.
7. #5 - Terry Labonte
8. #31 - Robby Gordon
9. #42 - Jamie McMurray
10. #41 - Casey Mears

Failed to qualify: Stanton Barrett (#94), Andy Hillenburg (#80)

- This race ended under caution. A fan, upset that the race was ending under caution, threw a cooler at the flagstand and hit the backup flagman.
- Kevin Harvick and Matt Kenseth were called to the NASCAR hauler after the race following contact under caution.

=== DHL 400 ===
The DHL 400 was held on June 20 at Michigan International Speedway. Jeff Gordon won the pole.

Top ten results

1. #12 - Ryan Newman
2. #9 - Kasey Kahne*
3. #88 - Dale Jarrett
4. #48 - Jimmie Johnson
5. #38 - Elliott Sadler
6. #40 - Sterling Marlin
7. #17 - Matt Kenseth
8. #18 - Bobby Labonte
9. #25 - Brian Vickers
10. #15 - Michael Waltrip

Failed to qualify: Kerry Earnhardt (#33), Carl Long (#00)

- Kasey Kahne got his fourth second-place finish of the season.

=== Dodge/Save Mart 350 ===
The Dodge/Save Mart 350 was held on June 27 at Infineon Raceway. Jeff Gordon won the pole and led 92 of the 110 laps en route to victory.

Top ten results

1. #24 - Jeff Gordon
2. #42 - Jamie McMurray
3. #39 - Scott Pruett
4. #15 - Michael Waltrip
5. #48 - Jimmie Johnson
6. #36 - Boris Said
7. #41 - Casey Mears
8. #6 - Mark Martin
9. #99 - Jeff Burton
10. #38 - Elliott Sadler

Failed to qualify: Morgan Shepherd (#89)

=== Pepsi 400 ===
The Pepsi 400 was held on July 3 at Daytona International Speedway. Jeff Gordon won the pole.

Top ten results

1. #24 - Jeff Gordon
2. #48 - Jimmie Johnson
3. #8 - Dale Earnhardt Jr.
4. #97 - Kurt Busch
5. #20 - Tony Stewart
6. #6 - Mark Martin
7. #18 - Bobby Labonte
8. #5 - Terry Labonte
9. #25 - Brian Vickers
10. #01 - Joe Nemechek

Failed to qualify: Chad Blount (#37), Tony Raines (#23), Derrike Cope (#94), Kirk Shelmerdine (#72), Eric McClure (#04), Kenny Wallace (#00)

- The start of the race was delayed more than 30 minutes due to rain and the race started under yellow to help the track dry from the rain.
- 8 cars sported Coca-Cola C2 liveries, which were driven by John Andretti, Greg Biffle, Tony Stewart, Ricky Rudd, Kevin Harvick, Kurt Busch, Bill Elliott, and Jeff Burton.
- This was the second Pepsi 400 televised by Fox.

=== Tropicana 400 ===
The Tropicana 400 was held on July 11 at Chicagoland Speedway. Jeff Gordon won the pole for the 4th consecutive race. This was the first time since Darrell Waltrip in 1981 that a driver won 4 consecutive poles in a season.

Top ten results

1. #20 - Tony Stewart
2. #48 - Jimmie Johnson
3. #88 - Dale Jarrett
4. #24 - Jeff Gordon
5. #19 - Jeremy Mayfield
6. #5 - Terry Labonte
7. #40 - Sterling Marlin
8. #01 - Joe Nemechek
9. #15 - Michael Waltrip
10. #29 - Kevin Harvick

Failed to qualify: Todd Bodine (#98), Greg Sacks (#13), Kirk Shelmerdine (#72)

- This race is known for a pit road fight that occurred between crew members of Kasey Kahne and Tony Stewart after Stewart spun Kahne, causing a crash that also collected multiple drivers. All of the pit crew, crew chiefs (Tommy Baldwin Jr. and Greg Zipadelli) and owners (Ray Evernham and Joe Gibbs) of the #9 and #20 were fined $50,000 for their actions. Stewart was not penalized.

=== Siemens 300 ===
The Siemens 300 was held on July 25 at New Hampshire International Speedway. Ryan Newman won the pole.

Top ten results

1. #97 - Kurt Busch
2. #24 - Jeff Gordon
3. #12 - Ryan Newman
4. #17 - Matt Kenseth
5. #20 - Tony Stewart
6. #15 - Michael Waltrip
7. #42 - Jamie McMurray
8. #9 - Kasey Kahne
9. #88 - Dale Jarrett
10. #19 - Jeremy Mayfield

Failed to qualify: Kevin Lepage (#51), Kyle Busch (#84), Ryan McGlynn (#00)

- During the previous off-week, Dale Earnhardt Jr. suffered second-and third-degree burns on his neck, chin and legs in a fiery accident during a practice session for the American Le Mans Series Grand Prix of Sonoma at Infineon Raceway. Earnhardt would be relieved by his Busch Series driver Martin Truex Jr. for this race.

=== Pennsylvania 500 ===
The Pennsylvania 500 was held on August 1 at Pocono Raceway. Casey Mears won the pole.

Top ten results

1. #48 - Jimmie Johnson
2. #6 - Mark Martin
3. #9 - Kasey Kahne
4. #16 - Greg Biffle
5. #24 - Jeff Gordon
6. #5 - Terry Labonte
7. #31 - Robby Gordon
8. #17 - Matt Kenseth
9. #19 - Jeremy Mayfield
10. #38 - Elliott Sadler

Failed to qualify: Kevin Lepage (#51), Andy Hillenburg (#37), A. J. Henriksen (#90)*

- John Andretti served as a relief driver for Dale Earnhardt Jr., who was still recovering from severe burns.
- Donlavey Racing made its last ever appearance in a NASCAR event this weekend, failing to qualify with driver A. J. Henriksen.

=== Brickyard 400 ===
The Brickyard 400 was held on August 8 at Indianapolis Motor Speedway. Casey Mears won the pole.

Top ten results

1. #24 - Jeff Gordon*
2. #88 - Dale Jarrett
3. #38 - Elliott Sadler
4. #9 - Kasey Kahne
5. #20 - Tony Stewart
6. #16 - Greg Biffle
7. #42 - Jamie McMurray
8. #29 - Kevin Harvick
9. #91 - Bill Elliott
10. #97 - Kurt Busch

Failed to qualify: Kevin Lepage (#51), Hermie Sadler (#02), Morgan Shepherd (#89), Greg Sacks (#13), Andy Hillenburg (#37), Geoff Bodine (#34), Kirk Shelmerdine (#72)

- Jeff Gordon became the first 4 time NASCAR winner at the Brickyard oval, and the only driver to do so until Jimmie Johnson in 2012.
- This race marked the first time that the green-white-checkered finish rule came into play. The race was extended after Brian Vickers and Ryan Newman crashed on lap 158. The race still ended under caution when Ricky Rudd crashed on the final lap.
- John Andretti was on standby for Dale Earnhardt Jr. once again, although he was not needed this time as Junior ran the full distance.

=== Sirius Satellite Radio at The Glen ===
The Sirius Satellite Radio at The Glen was held on August 15 at Watkins Glen International. Jimmie Johnson started on the pole after qualifying was rained out and set to the current owners points.

Top ten results

1. #20 - Tony Stewart*
2. #1 - Ron Fellows
3. #6 - Mark Martin
4. #41 - Casey Mears
5. #8 - Dale Earnhardt Jr.
6. #29 - Kevin Harvick
7. #19 - Jeremy Mayfield
8. #21 - Ricky Rudd
9. #17 - Matt Kenseth
10. #97 - Kurt Busch

Failed to qualify: Scott Pruett (#39), Boris Said (#36), Klaus Graf (#59), Stanton Barrett (#52)

- Tony Stewart put up a spectacular race, narrowly beating Ron Fellows for the win, despite suffering from severe illness.
- This was Jeff Burton's final start for Roush Racing before moving to Richard Childress Racing at Michigan the following week after he signed a three-year contract with Richard Childress Racing just before this race. Carl Edwards would take over the #99 car the following week, while Burton would move to the #30 RCR entry for the remainder of the season

=== GFS Marketplace 400 ===
The GFS Marketplace 400 was held on August 22 at Michigan International Speedway. Jimmie Johnson started on the pole after qualifying was rained out.

Top ten results

1. #16 - Greg Biffle
2. #6 - Mark Martin
3. #88 - Dale Jarrett
4. #42 - Jamie McMurray
5. #9 - Kasey Kahne
6. #97 - Kurt Busch
7. #24 - Jeff Gordon
8. #17 - Matt Kenseth
9. #20 - Tony Stewart
10. #99 - Carl Edwards*

Failed to qualify: Kevin Lepage (#51), Kerry Earnhardt (#33), Kyle Busch (#84), Kenny Wallace (#00), J. J. Yeley (#11), Mike Wallace (#35), Stan Boyd (#79), Stanton Barrett (#37)

- All five Roush Racing cars finished in the top 10.
- This was Carl Edwards' first start in the Nextel Cup Series as well as his first ever top ten finish.

=== Sharpie 500 ===
The Sharpie 500 was held on August 28 at Bristol Motor Speedway. Jeff Gordon won the pole.

Top ten results

1. #8 - Dale Earnhardt Jr.
2. #12 - Ryan Newman
3. #48 - Jimmie Johnson
4. #30 - Jeff Burton
5. #38 - Elliott Sadler
6. #40 - Sterling Marlin
7. #42 - Jamie McMurray
8. #97 - Kurt Busch
9. #17 - Matt Kenseth
10. #88 - Dale Jarrett

Failed to qualify: Hermie Sadler (#02), Stanton Barrett (#52), Brad Teague (#72), Tony Ave (#80), Ryan McGlynn (#00)

=== Pop Secret 500 ===
The inaugural Pop Secret 500 was held on September 5 at California Speedway. Brian Vickers won the pole.

Top ten results

1. #38 - Elliott Sadler*
2. #9 - Kasey Kahne*
3. #6 - Mark Martin
4. #42 - Jamie McMurray
5. #12 - Ryan Newman
6. #99 - Carl Edwards
7. #10 - Scott Riggs
8. #88 - Dale Jarrett
9. #31 - Robby Gordon
10. #2 - Rusty Wallace

Failed to qualify: Morgan Shepherd (#89), Kirk Shelmerdine (#72), Hermie Sadler (#02), Kevin Lepage (#37), Mike Wallace (#35)

- Portions of this race were filmed for the movie Herbie Fully Loaded.
- Kasey Kahne got his fifth second-place finish of the season.
- This was the only time Elliott Sadler would win multiple races in one season in his Cup career. It also turned out to be the final win of his Cup career.

=== Chevy Rock and Roll 400 ===
The Chevy Rock and Roll 400 was held on September 11 at Richmond International Raceway. Ryan Newman won the pole.

Top ten results

1. #19 - Jeremy Mayfield*
2. #8 - Dale Earnhardt Jr.
3. #24 - Jeff Gordon
4. #80 - Mike Bliss
5. #6 - Mark Martin
6. #99 - Carl Edwards
7. #09 - Mike Wallace
8. #16 - Greg Biffle
9. #42 - Jamie McMurray
10. #2 - Rusty Wallace

Failed to qualify: Johnny Sauter (#33), Tony Raines (#51), Kevin Lepage (#37), Greg Sacks (#13), Hermie Sadler (#02), Brad Teague (#92), Ryan McGlynn (#00), Morgan Shepherd (#89), Carl Long (#80)

- This race was notable when Jeremy Mayfield gained five positions from 14th to 9th and clinched the spot in the Chase.

Making The Chase - Starting with this year, and every year following until 2017, the fall race at Richmond served as the end of the Cup Series' regular season and as the cut off for making the Chase for the Nextel Cup. The Chase field for 2004 consisted of the following drivers:

1. 5050 points - #24 - Jeff Gordon
2. 5045 points - #48 - Jimmie Johnson
3. 5040 points - #8 - Dale Earnhardt Jr.
4. 5035 points - #20 - Tony Stewart
5. 5030 points - #17 - Matt Kenseth
6. 5025 points - #38 - Elliott Sadler
7. 5020 points - #97 - Kurt Busch
8. 5015 points - #6 - Mark Martin
9. 5010 points - #19 - Jeremy Mayfield
10. 5005 points - #12 - Ryan Newman

== Chase for the Nextel Cup ==
=== Sylvania 300 ===
The Sylvania 300 was held on September 19 at New Hampshire International Speedway. With qualifying canceled due to rain, the starting lineup was set by owner points. Therefore Jeff Gordon started on the pole.

Top ten results

1. #97 - Kurt Busch
2. #17 - Matt Kenseth
3. #8 - Dale Earnhardt Jr.
4. #9 - Kasey Kahne
5. #42 - Jamie McMurray
6. #01 - Joe Nemechek
7. #24 - Jeff Gordon
8. #38 - Elliott Sadler
9. #15 - Michael Waltrip
10. #29 - Kevin Harvick

Failed to qualify: Kevin Lepage (#37), Martin Truex Jr. (#1), Johnny Sauter (#33), Greg Sacks (#13), Ryan McGlynn (#00), Carl Long (#46), Tony Raines (#92), Stan Boyd (#79)

- This was the first race of the new 10-race playoff format.
- Tony Stewart saw his championship hopes end after unintentionally getting caught up in a wreck caused by Robby Gordon.

=== MBNA America 400 ===
The MBNA America 400 was held on September 26 at Dover International Speedway. Jeremy Mayfield won the pole.

Top ten results

1. #12 - Ryan Newman*
2. #6 - Mark Martin
3. #24 - Jeff Gordon
4. #88 - Dale Jarrett
5. #97 - Kurt Busch
6. #20 - Tony Stewart
7. #19 - Jeremy Mayfield
8. #42 - Jamie McMurray
9. #8 - Dale Earnhardt Jr.
10. #48 - Jimmie Johnson

Failed to qualify: Hermie Sadler (#02), Derrike Cope (#80), Greg Sacks (#13), Carl Long (#00), Kenny Hendrick (#35), Stanton Barrett (#92), Mike Garvey (#75)

- Ryan Newman won in dominant fashion, leading 325 of 400 laps and winning by a margin of 8.149 seconds.
- This race is known for a bizarre incident in which Matt Kenseth crashed into a tire barrier at the end of pit road.

=== EA Sports 500 ===
The EA Sports 500 was held on October 3 at Talladega Superspeedway. Joe Nemechek won the pole.

Top ten results

1. #8 - Dale Earnhardt Jr.*
2. #29 - Kevin Harvick
3. #88 - Dale Jarrett
4. #77 - Brendan Gaughan
5. #97 - Kurt Busch
6. #20 - Tony Stewart
7. #01 - Joe Nemechek
8. #41 - Casey Mears
9. #31 - Robby Gordon
10. #0 - Ward Burton

Failed to qualify: Kevin Lepage (#37), Kirk Shelmerdine (#72), Carl Long (#80)

- Dale Earnhardt Jr. was later penalized 25 points for uttering an obscenity during his post-race interview on NBC.
- This was the first play-by-play appearance for Bill Weber, due to Allen Bestwick's injury during a hockey match.
- This would DEI's last plate track win.

=== Banquet 400 presented by ConAgra Foods ===
The Banquet 400 presented by ConAgra Foods was held on October 10 at Kansas Speedway. Joe Nemechek won the pole.

Top ten results

1. #01 - Joe Nemechek*
2. #21 - Ricky Rudd
3. #16 - Greg Biffle
4. #38 - Elliott Sadler
5. #19 - Jeremy Mayfield
6. #97 - Kurt Busch
7. #42 - Jamie McMurray
8. #88 - Dale Jarrett
9. #8 - Dale Earnhardt Jr.
10. #77 - Brendan Gaughan

Failed to qualify: Mike Garvey (#75), Mike Wallace (#35), Carl Long (#00), Morgan Shepherd (#89)

- This would be Nemechek's 4th and final career Cup Series victory. Nemechek also joined Bobby Allison as the only two drivers to score his final Busch Series win and final Cup Series win in the same weekend. He won the Mr. Goodcents 300 the previous day.
- The three branches of the United States military that were sponsors at the time finished 1-2-3 (Army, Air Force, National Guard).
- Final win for MB2 Motorsports.

=== UAW-GM Quality 500 ===
The UAW-GM Quality 500 was held on October 16 at Lowe's Motor Speedway. Ryan Newman won the pole.

Top ten results

1. #48 - Jimmie Johnson
2. #24 - Jeff Gordon
3. #8 - Dale Earnhardt Jr.
4. #97 - Kurt Busch
5. #01 - Joe Nemechek
6. #88 - Dale Jarrett
7. #38 - Elliott Sadler
8. #42 - Jamie McMurray
9. #30 - Jeff Burton
10. #20 - Tony Stewart

Failed to qualify: Kenny Wallace (#00), Derrike Cope (#94), Mike Wallace (#35), Carl Long (#00), Kirk Shelmerdine (#72), Larry Foyt (#59), Hermie Sadler (#02), Morgan Shepherd (#89), Geoff Bodine (#98)

- Kasey Kahne led 207 laps and seemed to be en route to his first career Cup Series victory, but crashed out of the lead on lap 267 after blowing a tire.

=== Subway 500 ===
The Subway 500 was held on October 24 at Martinsville Speedway. Ryan Newman won the pole.

Top ten results

1. #48 - Jimmie Johnson
2. #42 - Jamie McMurray
3. #12 - Ryan Newman
4. #40 - Sterling Marlin
5. #97 - Kurt Busch
6. #19 - Jeremy Mayfield
7. #43 - Jeff Green
8. #29 - Kevin Harvick
9. #24 - Jeff Gordon
10. #2 - Rusty Wallace

Failed to qualify: Carl Long (#46), Brad Teague (#94), Greg Sacks (#13), Ryan McGlynn (#00), Morgan Shepherd (#89), Mike Garvey (#75), Klaus Graf (#59)

- The victory lane celebration was canceled after a tragic plane crash that took the lives of key personnel in the Hendrick Motorsports stable.

=== Bass Pro Shops MBNA 500 ===
The Bass Pro Shops MBNA 500 was held on October 31 at Atlanta Motor Speedway. Ryan Newman won the pole.

Top ten results

1. #48 - Jimmie Johnson*
2. #6 - Mark Martin
3. #99 - Carl Edwards
4. #01 - Joe Nemechek
5. #9 - Kasey Kahne
6. #30 - Jeff Burton
7. #25 - Brian Vickers
8. #42 - Jamie McMurray
9. #20 - Tony Stewart
10. #16 - Greg Biffle

Failed to qualify: Scott Riggs (#10), Scott Wimmer (#22), Kerry Earnhardt (#33), Johnny Sauter (#09), Hermie Sadler (#02), Mike Wallace (#4), Derrike Cope (#94), Randy LaJoie (#98), Greg Sacks (#13), Larry Foyt (#59), Kirk Shelmerdine (#72), Morgan Shepherd (#89), Andy Belmont (#80), Larry Hollenbeck (#62), Kenny Wallace (#00)

- Johnson won the race just one week after a plane crash that killed ten people involved with Hendrick Motorsports. The four Hendrick cars drove a special paint scheme for the remainder of the season to honor those involved in the crash.
- Johnson became the first driver since Jeff Gordon (last 2 races in 1998 and the 1999 Daytona 500) to win 3 Cup races in a row.
- Five of the ten Chase drivers finished 33rd or worse in this race. Points leader Kurt Busch and teammate Matt Kenseth suffered blown engines and finished 42nd and 41st, Elliott Sadler had problems on pit road and finished 36th, Jeff Gordon suffered mechanical issues and finished 34th, and Dale Earnhardt Jr. finished 33rd after crashing out late.

=== Checker Auto Parts 500 ===
The Checker Auto Parts 500 was held on November 7 at Phoenix International Raceway. Ryan Newman won the pole. The race at Phoenix was very cloudy and a short chance of rain in cold weather.

Top ten results

1. #8 - Dale Earnhardt Jr.*
2. #12 - Ryan Newman*
3. #24 - Jeff Gordon
4. #29 - Kevin Harvick
5. #9 - Kasey Kahne
6. #48 - Jimmie Johnson
7. #2 - Rusty Wallace
8. #20 - Tony Stewart
9. #18 - Bobby Labonte
10. #97 - Kurt Busch

Failed to qualify: Mike Garvey (#75), Tony Raines (#51), Stanton Barrett (#94), Mario Gosselin (#80), Ryan McGlynn (#00), Geoff Bodine (#93), Kirk Shelmerdine (#72)

- The race was extended to 315 laps / 315 miles due to a green-white-checkered finish.
- After two straight 33rd-place finishes at Martinsville and Atlanta, Dale Earnhardt Jr. won his sixth race of the year, moving him up from fifth to third in the points standings with two races left in this season.
- Ryan Newman won the pole for the 4th consecutive race. As of 2020, Ryan Newman is the last driver to win 4 straight pole positions.

=== Mountain Dew Southern 500 ===
The Mountain Dew Southern 500 was held on November 14 at Darlington Raceway. Qualifying was canceled due to rain and the starting lineup was set by owner's points so Kurt Busch won the pole.

Top ten results

1. #48 - Jimmie Johnson*
2. #6 - Mark Martin
3. #24 - Jeff Gordon
4. #42 - Jamie McMurray
5. #9 - Kasey Kahne
6. #97 - Kurt Busch*
7. #99 - Carl Edwards
8. #01 - Joe Nemechek
9. #18 - Bobby Labonte
10. #0 - Mike Bliss

Failed to qualify: Kevin Lepage (#37), John Andretti (#14), Derrike Cope (#94), Carl Long (#00), Travis Kvapil (#06)

- With this win, Jimmie Johnson became the first driver since Dale Earnhardt in 1987 to pull off the season sweep at 3 different tracks in one season. Along with Darlington, Johnson pulled off season sweeps at Pocono and Charlotte.
- This would be the last Darlington race with the "Southern 500" name until 2009.
- Tony Stewart and Ryan Newman were eliminated from Chase contention by being greater than 156 points behind the points leader.

=== Ford 400 ===
The Ford 400 was held on November 21 at Homestead–Miami Speedway. Points leader Kurt Busch won the pole. After Darlington, five drivers were still mathematically eligible for the championship, with Busch holding an 18-point lead over Jimmie Johnson, Jeff Gordon, Dale Earnhardt Jr., and Mark Martin. All five were separated by 82 points.

Top ten results

1. #16 - Greg Biffle
2. #48 - Jimmie Johnson
3. #24 - Jeff Gordon
4. #20 - Tony Stewart
5. #97 - Kurt Busch*
6. #77 - Brendan Gaughan
7. #42 - Jamie McMurray
8. #2 - Rusty Wallace
9. #21 - Ricky Rudd
10. #29 - Kevin Harvick

Failed to qualify: Kyle Petty (#45), Johnny Sauter (#09), Mike Garvey (#75), Tony Raines (#51), Kevin Lepage (#37), Todd Bodine (#50), Larry Foyt (#70), J. J. Yeley (#11), Randy LaJoie (#98), Morgan Shepherd (#89), Kirk Shelmerdine (#72), Carl Long (#80), Geoff Bodine (#93)

- Despite finishing behind Johnson and Gordon, Kurt Busch won the 2004 NASCAR NEXTEL Cup Championship by 8 points ahead of Johnson, the closest margin in Cup history until the 2011 season.
- Busch's championship run almost ended on lap 93, when the right-front wheel came loose while running in 2nd, and then broke off while entering pit road. Busch was able to bring the car to his pit stall without any major damage, and the caution caused by the lost wheel allowed him to stay on the lead lap.
- In victory lane, Busch dedicated his championship to the Hendrick family following the plane crash four weeks prior at Martinsville.
- Busch's championship victory would make him the 6th different champion in the last 6 years, a NASCAR Modern Era record, which would later be tied with the 2016-2021 seasons.

== Full Drivers' Championship ==
(key) Bold - Pole position awarded by time. Italics - Pole position set by owner's points standings. * – Most laps led.

Pos.	Driver	DAY	CAR	LVS	ATL	DAR	BRI	TEX	MAR	TAL	CAL	RCH	CLT	DOV	POC	MCH	SON	DAY	CHI	NHA	POC	IND	GLN	MCH	BRI	CAL	RCH	NHA	DOV	TAL	KAN	CLT	MAR	ATL	PHO	DAR	HOM	Pts.
1	Kurt Busch	16	8	9	12	6*	1*	6	11	36	23	31	11	12	5	11	36	4	35	1	26	10	10	6	8	11	15	1*	5	5	6	4	5*	42	10	6	**5**	6506
2	Jimmie Johnson	5	41	16	4	1	16	9	4	4	2	2	**1***	32	1*	4	5	2	2	11	1*	36	40	40	3	14	36	11	10	37	32	1	1	1	6	1	2	6498
3	Jeff Gordon	8	10	15	10	41	9	3	**6***	1	1*	6	30	36	4	**38***	**1***	**1***	**4**	2	5	1*	21	7	**14**	37	3	7	3	19	13	2	9	34	3	3*	3	6490
4	Mark Martin	43	12	5	14	7	23	17	34	6	11	7	36	1	36	34	8	6	24	14	2	25	3	2	13	3*	5	13	2	15	20	13	12	2*	15	2	11	6399
5	Dale Earnhardt Jr.	1	5	35	1	10	11	4	3	2*	19	1*	6	3	6	21	11	3	22	31	25	27	5	21	1*	34	2	3	9	1*	9	3	33	33	1*	11	23	6368
6	Tony Stewart	2*	26	3	7*	17	24	8	14	22	16	4	9	2*	27	24	15	5	1*	5	35	5	1*	9	19	18	19	39	6	6	14	10	15	9	8	17	4	6326
7	Ryan Newman	31	**6**	27	**5**	3	**7**	39	5	11	3	9	35	24	30	1	14	12	34	**3***	13	31	26	14	2	5	20	33	1*	16	33	**14**	**3**	**17**	**2**	34	30	6180
8	Matt Kenseth	9	1*	1*	6	31	5	16	8	42	4	5	3	22	21	7	20	39	12	4	8	16	9	8	9	22	28	2	32	14	17	11	16	41	36	20	19	6069
9	Elliott Sadler	7	18	6	29	5	14	1	12	28	22	12	5	18	12	5	10	26	21	15	10	3	15	32	5	1	17	8	20	22	4	7	32	36	38	23	34	6024
10	Jeremy Mayfield	25	11	14	2	9	17	34	36	21	14	22	8	8	2	19	30	22	5	10	9	11	7	11	22	16	1*	35	7	38	5*	30	6	26	21	19	35	6000
Chase for the Nextel Cup cut-off
Pos.	Driver	DAY	CAR	LVS	ATL	DAR	BRI	TEX	MAR	TAL	CAL	RCH	CLT	DOV	POC	MCH	SON	DAY	CHI	NHA	POC	IND	GLN	MCH	BRI	CAL	RCH	NHA	DOV	TAL	KAN	CLT	MAR	ATL	PHO	DAR	HOM	Pts.
11	Jamie McMurray	36	3	4	37	21	8	10	7	9	15	38	4	15	9	37	2	37	13	7	30	7	13	4	7	4	9	5	8	17	7	8	2	8	24	4	7	4597
12	Bobby Labonte	11	25	8	18	2	33	**25**	2	10	5	3	13	25	3	8	33	7	18	17	29	15	11	26	16	20	16	18	14	35	16	17	18	20	9	9	12	4277
13	Kasey Kahne **(R)**	41	2	**2**	3	**13**	40	2*	21	30	**13**	28	12	21	**14**	2	31	25	36	8	3	4	14	5	21	2	24	4	42	27	12	32*	13	5	5	5	38	4274
14	Kevin Harvick	4	13	21	32	8	3	13	19	3	9	25	23	10	20	17	12	14	10	13	32	8	6	16	24	28	12	10	19	2	35	36	8	35	4	32	10	4228
15	Dale Jarrett	10	40	11	9	32	21	18	10	16	24	13	18	11	26	3	18	16	3	9	24	2	27	3	10	8	26	27	4	3	8	6	37	15	22	37	24	4214
16	Rusty Wallace	29	7	10	35	29	2	5	1	33	35	16	10	13	32	22	28	27	11	30	17	13	25	36	26	10	10	14	13	26	18	31	10	11	7	18	8	3960
17	Greg Biffle	**12**	23	40	8	12	12	31	35	15	33	21	21	26	11	23	13	31	20	35	4	6	35	1*	11	36	8	28	11	28	3	33	17	10	13	24	1*	3902
18	Jeff Burton	42	37	13	20	11	38	27	25	7	26	14	22	4	24	13	9	23	33	12	34	12	12	12	4	15	23	15	33	13	15	9	11	6	11	13	36	3902
19	Joe Nemechek	6	24	19	15	20	27	14	27	32	28	36	14	38	18	35	29	10	8	20	16	17	22	13	42	12	22	6	35	**7**	**1**	5	30	4	12	8	27	3878
20	Michael Waltrip	38	33	37	23	35	10	20	15	12	32	10	2	6	33	10	4	13	9	6	36	20	20	17	27	23	13	9	16	25	11	28	19	14	17	33	17	3878
21	Sterling Marlin	37	4	18	16	14	4	26	9	31	27	15	39	29	31	6	21	20	7	21	15	33	36	15	6	26	14	12	15	34	34	12	4	19	25	12	16	3857
22	Casey Mears	14	21	7	34	15	36	7	37	8	8	32	7	28	10	31	7	11	15	26	**18**	**26**	4	20	30	29	35	29	24	8	31	20	29	13	34	26	26	3690
23	Robby Gordon	35	36	30	17	4	19	23	30	5	12	24	20	14	8	33	34	19	17	25	7	22	16	25	12	9	32	32	30	9	28	18	23	16	35	15	29	3646
24	Ricky Rudd	18	19	28	31	33	37	22	20	**17**	17	11	26	30	19	12	35	17	32	39	12	28	8	24	40	17	21	37	12	12	2	16	14	12	19	16	9	3615
25	Brian Vickers **(R)**	39	16	23	21	23	35	12	13	27	29	**8**	15	23	13	9	22	9	14	34	14	29	30	22	20	**13**	37	22	38	36	19	40	27	7	18	21	18	3521
26	Terry Labonte	20	17	17	24	19	18	41	23	25	7	18	37	7	7	26	40	8	6	16	6	38	39	27	15	19	18	24	27	21	21	25	25	31	32	28	31	3519
27	Scott Wimmer **(R)**	3	15	39	27	16	13	33	29	18	30	30	28	9	35	14	25	32	23	18	11	32	19	18	36	21	38	36	23	31	36	26	20	DNQ	26	22	13	3198
28	Brendan Gaughan **(R)**	19	20	22	33	27	20	38	17	13	6	34	33	27	39	16	26	36	30	22	28	35	34	33	35	42	27	30	22	4	10	23	34	18	30	27	6	3165
29	Scott Riggs **(R)**	34	31	29	25	30	34	15	28	34	25	35	25	5	16	20	42	21	29	28	22	37	23	19	17	7	39	26	31	11	26	38	26	DNQ	14	25	15	3090
30	Jeff Green	33	28	34	19	24	29	35	24	19	37	37	27	31	15	27	27	30	28	24	33	14	17	23	29	27	25	19	21	39	29	35	7	21	23	14	37	3054
31	Ken Schrader	40	27	32	26	22	6	19	40	23	20	23	31	34	25	39	23	35	27	37	21	18	28	28	32	33	30	16	25	20	27	21	31	23	20	30	25	3032
32	Ward Burton	17	9	26	13	18	28	32	22	40	10	20	16	19	17	30	24	40	19	29	31	39	37	30	18	31	40	25	37	10	30	19	28	30	40			2929
33	Kyle Petty	21	39	12	28	34	25	21	18	24	39	27	38	37	37	18	32	24	26	27	19	23	18	29	37	35	34	21	17	29	38	27	22	29	28	35	DNQ	2811
34	Ricky Craven	23	35	25	22	36	22	28	16	43	18	26	24	16	34	29	16	38	38	38	20	24	32	35	34			17		30								2086
35	Jimmy Spencer	24						29	38	20	38	41	29	17	23	28		29	25	23	23	19	42	31	31	32	33	38	26	40	25	29	35					1969
36	Johnny Sauter **(R)**	26	14	24	30	26	15	24	31	14	21	19	40	20													DNQ	DNQ				24		DNQ	39	29	DNQ	1430
37	Carl Edwards																							10	33	6	6	20	18	42	22	QL	24	3	37	7	14	1424
38	Dave Blaney	15			11			11		39		40	17	33	29	15		15	37	33	27	21	24							QL		37						1347
39	Bobby Hamilton Jr.											17	42					42	41	19				38		38	11		29	43	23	15	36	38	16	31	21	1271
40	Derrike Cope	30	30	33	38	25	26	37	33	38	31	29	34			42		DNQ				40		41	38	40	42		DNQ			DNQ		DNQ		DNQ		1058
41	Todd Bodine				41	40		43	39	DNQ	34	33	DNQ	DNQ	42	36			DNQ	41	38	41	41	43	23		43	23			39		43	39	43	39	DNQ	986
42	Morgan Shepherd		Wth	42	DNQ	35	DNQ	DNQ	32	41	36	39	DNQ	42	38	40		33	Wth	40	37	DNQ	38	34	41	DNQ	DNQ	40	34		DNQ	DNQ	DNQ	DNQ	41	43	DNQ	925
43	Kevin Lepage	33	22	36	36	28	30						43	41	43	43			42	DNQ	DNQ	DNQ		DNQ	43	DNQ	DNQ	DNQ	36	DNQ		39	42	28	27	DNQ	DNQ	915
44	Hermie Sadler						31		26		41	42	41	DNQ					40	43		DNQ	33	42	DNQ	DNQ	DNQ	31	DNQ	23	40	DNQ	38	DNQ	33	40	43	852
45	John Andretti	13	29	Wth									19					43	16													22		25	34	DNQ	20	818
46	Mike Wallace													35				41		32				DNQ	28	DNQ	7	34		18	DNQ	DNQ		DNQ	29	38	33	764
47	Kirk Shelmerdine	DNQ	42	43	40	39	41	42	DNQ	DNQ	42	DNQ	DNQ	39	40	43		DNQ	DNQ		41	DNQ		37		DNQ	41	42	40	DNQ	43	DNQ	40	DNQ	DNQ	42	DNQ	723
48	Bill Elliott			20				36										18				9				25								22				595
49	Mike Bliss																		31								4									10	40	407
50	Kenny Wallace									37								DNQ				34		DNQ	25					32		DNQ		DNQ			22	365
51	Shane Hmiel																									39	29				24			24			41	349
52	Kyle Busch			41				DNQ					32							DNQ				DNQ		24					37	34		43				345
53	Tony Raines													40				DNQ				30			39	Wth	DNQ	DNQ	28			43	Wth	40	DNQ		DNQ	318
54	P. J. Jones														22	25	39		39		43																	316
55	Boris Said																6						DNQ			30											28	302
56	Geoff Bodine						39						DNQ		28	32						DNQ						41	39			DNQ			DNQ	Wth	Wth	278
57	Johnny Benson	27		31				40		29	QL																											271
58	Carl Long		38	38									DNQ	Wth	41	DNQ	Wth			42	39			39			DNQ	DNQ	DNQ	DNQ	DNQ	DNQ	DNQ	Wth		DNQ	DNQ	267
59	Larry Gunselman		Wth	DNQ										DNQ			37	34					43							33	42							248
60	Joe Ruttman		43		43	43	42		43		43															Wth			41									247
61	Kerry Earnhardt									35			Wth			DNQ		28						DNQ						24				DNQ		Wth		228
62	Stanton Barrett					DNQ	32	Wth	41		40	DNQ	DNQ	43	DNQ								DNQ	DNQ	DNQ				DNQ		41				DNQ			224
63	Travis Kvapil																																21	32		DNQ	39	213
64	Scott Pruett																3					42	DNQ															207
65	Andy Hillenburg	DNQ	34	Wth	42	42	43	DNQ	42	Wth			DNQ		Wth	DNQ					DNQ	DNQ																206
66	Larry Foyt	28	32	Wth			Wth	30		DNQ																						DNQ		DNQ			DNQ	194
67	Ron Fellows																						2															170
68	Randy LaJoie											43																						DNQ	42	36	DNQ	126
69	J. J. Yeley																							DNQ		41								27			DNQ	122
70	Martin Truex Jr.																			QL								DNQ						37			32	119
71	Greg Sacks																		DNQ		42	DNQ		Wth			DNQ	DNQ	DNQ			41	DNQ	DNQ			42	114
72	Klaus Graf																17						DNQ										DNQ					112
73	Tom Hubert																43						29															110
74	Jim Inglebright																19																					106
75	Jeff Fuller																									43			43			42						105
76	Andy Belmont	Wth	Wth		39	37		DNQ		Wth					Wth																			DNQ				98
77	Mike Skinner	22																																				97
78	Eric McClure									26								DNQ																				90
79	Ted Christopher																			36								43										89
80	Mario Gosselin																																41		DNQ	41		80
81	Chad Blount																	DNQ	43											41								74
82	David Green																										31											70
83	Tony Ave																						31		DNQ													70
84	Austin Cameron																38																					49
85	Chad Chaffin																																39					46
86	Jason Jarrett																				40																	43
87	Brandon Ash																41																					40
88	Jason Leffler																					43																34
89	Steve Park												DNQ																									
90	Jeff Fultz												DNQ																									
91	A. J. Henriksen																				DNQ																	
92	Larry Hollenbeck																							DNQ				Wth						DNQ				
93	Stan Boyd													Wth	Wth									DNQ				DNQ										
94	Brad Teague																								DNQ		DNQ						DNQ					
95	Ryan McGlynn		Wth						Wth											Wth					DNQ		DNQ	DNQ					DNQ		DNQ			
96	Kenny Hendrick													Wth															DNQ									
97	Mike Garvey																							Wth			Wth		DNQ		DNQ		DNQ		DNQ	Wth	DNQ	
98	Kevin Ray													Wth																								
99	Damon Lusk																									Wth						Wth						
100	Steve Grissom																									Wth												
101	Ted Musgrave																																			Wth		
Pos.	Driver	DAY	CAR	LVS	ATL	DAR	BRI	TEX	MAR	TAL	CAL	RCH	CLT	DOV	POC	MCH	SON	DAY	CHI	NHA	POC	IND	GLN	MCH	BRI	CAL	RCH	NHA	DOV	TAL	KAN	CLT	MAR	ATL	PHO	DAR	HOM	Pts.

== Rookie of the Year ==
The Rookie of the year battle in 2004 marked the first time since 1998 that a rookie driver did not visit victory lane. The winner of the battle was dark horse candidate Kasey Kahne, who went from a 41st-place finish at the season opening Daytona 500, to being narrowly defeated by Matt Kenseth the next week at Rockingham, and he never looked back, grabbing fourteen top ten finishes and thirteen top-five finishes, as well as a couple of pole positions. Pre-season favorites Scott Wimmer and Brian Vickers struggled, although Wimmer placed third in the Daytona 500, but neither made competitive strides during the season. Brendan Gaughan was a pleasant surprise, posting four top tens and finishing runner-up to Kahne for the award, while Scott Riggs only had two-top ten finishes. The only other rookie, Johnny Sauter, was released from his ride mid-season due to poor performance and never made a challenge for the top honor.

== See also ==
- 2004 NASCAR Busch Series
- 2004 NASCAR Craftsman Truck Series
- 2004 Chase for the Nextel Cup
