= 2004 Sylvania 300 =

Race details
- Race 27 of 36 in the 2004 NASCAR Nextel Cup Series season
- Date: September 19, 2004
- Location: New Hampshire International Speedway, Loudon, New Hampshire
- Course: Permanent racing facility
- Course length: 1.058 miles (1.702 km)
- Distance: 300 laps, 317.4 mi (510.805 km)
- Average speed: 109.753 miles per hour (176.630 km/h)

Pole position
| Driver | Jeff Gordon | Hendrick Motorsports |
- Time: no time trials

Most laps led
| Driver | Kurt Busch | Roush Racing |
- Laps: 155

Winner
| No. 97 | Kurt Busch | Roush Racing |

Television in the United States
- Network: TNT
- Announcers: Allen Bestwick, Benny Parsons, & Wally Dallenbach Jr.

The 2004 Sylvania 300 was a NASCAR Nextel Cup Series race held on September 19, 2004, at New Hampshire International Speedway, in Loudon, New Hampshire. Contested at 300 laps on the1.058-mile (1.703 km) speedway, it was the 27th race of the 2004 NASCAR Nextel Cup Series season.

Kurt Busch of Roush Racing won the race.

== Background ==
New Hampshire International Speedway is a 1.058-mile (1.703 km) oval speedway located in Loudon, New Hampshire which has hosted NASCAR racing annually since the early 1990s, as well as an IndyCar weekend and the oldest motorcycle race in North America, the Loudon Classic. Nicknamed "The Magic Mile", the speedway is often converted into a 1.6-mile (2.6 km) road course, which includes much of the oval. The track was originally the site of Bryar Motorsports Park before being purchased and redeveloped by Bob Bahre. The track is currently one of eight major NASCAR tracks owned and operated by Speedway Motorsports.

== Summary ==
The 2004 Sylvania 300 was the first time drivers raced in the Chase for the Nextel Cup format. Rain cancelled qualifying, prompting the grid to be set from owner's points. Jeff Gordon led them down to the green flag. Afterward, Greg Biffle got in the back of Robby Gordon sending Gordon spinning. Later in the race Robby Gordon spun Biffle collecting Chase contenders Tony Stewart and Jeremy Mayfield. Robby Gordon was penalized two laps for aggressive driving. Kurt Busch won the race to start his run toward his first Nextel Cup Series championship.

== Top 10 results ==
| Pos | No. | Driver | Team | Manufacturer |
|---|---|---|---|---|
| 1 | 97 | Kurt Busch | Roush Racing | Ford |
| 2 | 17 | Matt Kenseth | Roush Racing | Ford |
| 3 | 8 | Dale Earnhardt Jr. | Dale Earnhardt, Inc. | Chevrolet |
| 4 | 9 | Kasey Kahne | Evernham Motorsports | Dodge |
| 5 | 42 | Jamie McMurray | Chip Ganassi Racing | Dodge |
| 6 | 01 | Joe Nemechek | HMBV Motorsports | Chevrolet |
| 7 | 24 | Jeff Gordon | Hendrick Motorsports | Chevrolet |
| 8 | 38 | Elliott Sadler | Robert Yates Racing | Ford |
| 9 | 15 | Michael Waltrip | Dale Earnhardt, Inc. | Chevrolet |
| 10 | 29 | Kevin Harvick | Richard Childress Racing | Chevrolet |

== Race Statistics ==
- Time of race: 2:53:31
- Average Speed: 109.753 miles per hour (176.630 km/h)
- Pole Speed: no time trials
- Cautions: 7 for 30 laps
- Margin of Victory: 2.488 sec
- Lead changes: 15
- Percent of race run under caution: 10%
- Average green flag run: 33.8 laps
