= 2004 Samsung/Radio Shack 500 =

Race details
- Race 7 of 36 in the 2004 NASCAR Nextel Cup Series
- The 2004 Samsung/Radio Shack 500 program cover, with artwork by Sam Bass.
- Date: April 4, 2004
- Official name: 8th Annual Samsung/Radio Shack 500
- Location: Fort Worth, Texas, Texas Motor Speedway
- Course: Permanent racing facility
- Course length: 1.5 miles (2.41 km)
- Distance: 334 laps, 501 mi (806.281 km)
- Scheduled distance: 334 laps, 501 mi (806.281 km)
- Average speed: 138.845 miles per hour (223.449 km/h)
- Attendance: 216,000

Pole position
Driver	Bobby Labonte	Joe Gibbs Racing
- Time: 27.849

Most laps led
Driver	Kasey Kahne	Evernham Motorsports
- Laps: 148

Winner
No. 38	Elliott Sadler	Robert Yates Racing

Television in the United States
- Network: FOX
- Announcers: Mike Joy, Larry McReynolds, Darrell Waltrip

Radio in the United States
- Radio: Performance Racing Network

The 2004 Samsung/Radio Shock 500 was the seventh stock car race of the 2004 NASCAR Nextel Cup Series season and the eighth iteration of the event. The race was held on Sunday, April 4, 2004, before a crowd of 216,000 in Fort Worth, Texas at Texas Motor Speedway, a 1.5 miles (2.4 km) permanent tri-oval shaped racetrack. The race took the scheduled 334 laps to complete. At race's end, Elliott Sadler of Robert Yates Racing would win in a photo finish against Kasey Kahne of Evernham Motorsports to collect his second career NASCAR Nextel Cup Series win and his first of the season. Sadler would win by 0.028 seconds over Kahne. To fill out the podium, Jeff Gordon of Hendrick Motorsports would finish 3rd.

== Background ==
The layout of Texas Motor Speedway, the venue where the race as held.

Texas Motor Speedway is a speedway located in the northernmost portion of the U.S. city of Fort Worth, Texas – the portion located in Denton County, Texas. The track measures 1.5 miles (2.4 km) around and is banked 24 degrees in the turns, and is of the oval design, where the front straightaway juts outward slightly. The track layout is similar to Atlanta Motor Speedway and Charlotte Motor Speedway (formerly Lowe's Motor Speedway). The track is owned by Speedway Motorsports, Inc., the same company that owns Atlanta and Charlotte Motor Speedway, as well as the short-track Bristol Motor Speedway.

=== Entry list ===
#	Driver	Team	Make
0	Ward Burton	Haas CNC Racing	Chevrolet
01	Joe Nemechek	MBV Motorsports	Chevrolet
2	Rusty Wallace	Penske-Jasper Racing	Dodge
02	Andy Belmont	SCORE Motorsports	Pontiac
4	Jimmy Spencer	Morgan–McClure Motorsports	Chevrolet
5	Terry Labonte	Hendrick Motorsports	Chevrolet
6	Mark Martin	Roush Racing	Ford
8	Dale Earnhardt, Jr.	Dale Earnhardt, Inc.	Chevrolet
9	Kasey Kahne	Evernham Motorsports	Dodge
09	Johnny Benson Jr.	Phoenix Racing	Dodge
10	Scott Riggs	MBV Motorsports	Chevrolet
12	Ryan Newman	Penske-Jasper Racing	Dodge
14	Larry Foyt	A. J. Foyt Enterprises	Dodge
15	Michael Waltrip	Dale Earnhardt, Inc.	Chevrolet
16	Greg Biffle	Roush Racing	Ford
17	Matt Kenseth	Roush Racing	Ford
18	Bobby Labonte	Joe Gibbs Racing	Chevrolet
19	Jeremy Mayfield	Evernham Motorsports	Dodge
20	Tony Stewart	Joe Gibbs Racing	Chevrolet
21	Ricky Rudd	Wood Brothers Racing	Ford
22	Scott Wimmer	Bill Davis Racing	Dodge
23	Dave Blaney	Bill Davis Racing	Dodge
24	Jeff Gordon	Hendrick Motorsports	Chevrolet
25	Brian Vickers	Hendrick Motorsports	Chevrolet
29	Kevin Harvick	Richard Childress Racing	Chevrolet
30	Johnny Sauter	Richard Childress Racing	Chevrolet
31	Robby Gordon	Richard Childress Racing	Chevrolet
32	Ricky Craven	PPI Motorsports	Chevrolet
38	Elliott Sadler	Robert Yates Racing	Ford
40	Sterling Marlin	Chip Ganassi Racing	Dodge
41	Casey Mears	Chip Ganassi Racing	Dodge
42	Jamie McMurray	Chip Ganassi Racing	Dodge
43	Jeff Green	Petty Enterprises	Dodge
45	Kyle Petty	Petty Enterprises	Dodge
48	Jimmie Johnson	Hendrick Motorsports	Chevrolet
49	Ken Schrader	BAM Racing	Dodge
50	Derrike Cope	Arnold Motorsports	Dodge
72	Kirk Shelmerdine	Kirk Shelmerdine Racing	Ford
77	Brendan Gaughan	Penske-Jasper Racing	Dodge
80	Andy Hillenburg	Hover Motorsports	Ford
84	Kyle Busch	Hendrick Motorsports	Chevrolet
88	Dale Jarrett	Robert Yates Racing	Ford
89	Morgan Shepherd	Shepherd Racing Ventures	Dodge
91	Bill Elliott	Evernham Motorsports	Dodge
94	Stanton Barrett*	W. W. Motorsports	Chevrolet
97	Kurt Busch	Roush Racing	Ford
98	Todd Bodine	Mach 1 Motorsports	Ford
99	Jeff Burton	Roush Racing	Ford
Official entry list

*Withdrew.

== Practice ==
=== First practice ===
The first practice session would occur on Friday, April 2, at 11:20 AM CST and would last for two hours. Casey Mears of Chip Ganassi Racing would set the fastest time in the session, with a lap of 28.081 and an average speed of 192.301 miles per hour (309.478 km/h).

Pos.	#	Driver	Team	Make	Time	Speed
1	41	Casey Mears	Chip Ganassi Racing	Dodge	28.081	192.301
2	16	Greg Biffle	Roush Racing	Ford	28.092	192.226
3	48	Jimmie Johnson	Hendrick Motorsports	Chevrolet	28.105	192.137
Full first practice results

=== Second practice ===
The second practice session would occur on Saturday, April 3, at 9:30 AM CST and would last for 45 minutes. Bill Elliott of Evernham Motorsports would set the fastest time in the session, with a lap of 28.759 and an average speed of 187.767 miles per hour (302.182 km/h).

Pos.	#	Driver	Team	Make	Time	Speed
1	91	Bill Elliott	Evernham Motorsports	Dodge	28.759	187.767
2	16	Greg Biffle	Roush Racing	Ford	28.856	187.136
3	41	Casey Mears	Chip Ganassi Racing	Dodge	28.925	186.690
Full second practice results

=== Third and final practice ===
The third and final practice session, sometimes referred to as Happy Hour, would occur on Saturday, April 3, at 11:10 AM CST and would last for 45 minutes. Jeremy Mayfield of Evernham Motorsports would set the fastest time in the session, with a lap of 28.759 and an average speed of 187.767 miles per hour (302.182 km/h).

Pos.	#	Driver	Team	Make	Time	Speed
1	19	Jeremy Mayfield	Evernham Motorsports	Dodge	28.957	186.483
2	23	Dave Blaney	Bill Davis Racing	Dodge	29.003	186.188
3	38	Elliott Sadler	Robert Yates Racing	Ford	29.124	185.414
Full Happy Hour practice results

== Qualifying ==
Qualifying was held on Friday, April 2, at 3:00 PM CST. Each driver would have two laps to set a fastest time; the fastest of the two would count as their official qualifying lap. Positions 1-38 would be decided on time, while positions 39-43 would be based on provisionals. Four spots are awarded by the use of provisionals based on owner's points. The fifth is awarded to a past champion who has not otherwise qualified for the race. If no past champ needs the provisional, the next team in the owner points will be awarded a provisional.

Bobby Labonte of Joe Gibbs Racing would win the pole, setting a time of 27.849 and an average speed of 193.903 miles per hour (312.057 km/h).

Andy Belmont, driving for SCORE Motorsports would crash on his first lap. As the team had already run out of provisionals, Belmont failed to qualify.

Four drivers would fail to qualify: Kyle Busch, Morgan Shepherd, Andy Hillenburg, and Andy Belmont.

=== Full qualifying results ===
Pos.	#	Driver	Team	Make	Time	Speed
1	18	Bobby Labonte	Joe Gibbs Racing	Chevrolet	27.849	193.903
2	91	Bill Elliott	Evernham Motorsports	Dodge	27.874	193.729
3	9	Kasey Kahne	Evernham Motorsports	Dodge	27.882	193.673
4	16	Greg Biffle	Roush Racing	Ford	27.951	193.195
5	01	Joe Nemechek	MBV Motorsports	Chevrolet	27.952	193.188
6	41	Casey Mears	Chip Ganassi Racing	Dodge	27.961	193.126
7	8	Dale Earnhardt Jr.	Dale Earnhardt, Inc.	Chevrolet	27.965	193.098
8	48	Jimmie Johnson	Hendrick Motorsports	Chevrolet	27.993	192.905
9	24	Jeff Gordon	Hendrick Motorsports	Chevrolet	28.043	192.561
10	2	Rusty Wallace	Penske-Jasper Racing	Dodge	28.062	192.431
11	88	Dale Jarrett	Robert Yates Racing	Ford	28.069	192.383
12	97	Kurt Busch	Roush Racing	Ford	28.073	192.356
13	25	Brian Vickers	Hendrick Motorsports	Chevrolet	28.074	192.349
14	40	Sterling Marlin	Chip Ganassi Racing	Dodge	28.139	191.904
15	12	Ryan Newman	Penske-Jasper Racing	Dodge	28.141	191.891
16	77	Brendan Gaughan	Penske-Jasper Racing	Dodge	28.149	191.836
17	20	Tony Stewart	Joe Gibbs Racing	Chevrolet	28.173	191.673
18	31	Robby Gordon	Richard Childress Racing	Chevrolet	28.223	191.333
19	38	Elliott Sadler	Robert Yates Racing	Ford	28.226	191.313
20	23	Dave Blaney	Bill Davis Racing	Dodge	28.239	191.225
21	19	Jeremy Mayfield	Evernham Motorsports	Dodge	28.251	191.144
22	29	Kevin Harvick	Richard Childress Racing	Chevrolet	28.259	191.090
23	99	Jeff Burton	Roush Racing	Ford	28.269	191.022
24	10	Scott Riggs	MBV Motorsports	Chevrolet	28.296	190.840
25	17	Matt Kenseth	Roush Racing	Ford	28.298	190.826
26	42	Jamie McMurray	Chip Ganassi Racing	Dodge	28.320	190.678
27	0	Ward Burton	Haas CNC Racing	Chevrolet	28.342	190.530
28	6	Mark Martin	Roush Racing	Ford	28.350	190.476
29	21	Ricky Rudd	Wood Brothers Racing	Ford	28.386	190.235
30	5	Terry Labonte	Hendrick Motorsports	Chevrolet	28.390	190.208
31	50	Derrike Cope	Arnold Motorsports	Dodge	28.412	190.061
32	22	Scott Wimmer	Bill Davis Racing	Dodge	28.422	189.994
33	43	Jeff Green	Petty Enterprises	Dodge	28.453	189.787
34	09	Johnny Benson Jr.	Phoenix Racing	Dodge	28.462	189.727
35	14	Larry Foyt	A. J. Foyt Enterprises	Dodge	28.493	189.520
36	98	Todd Bodine	Mach 1 Motorsports	Ford	28.551	189.135
37	30	Johnny Sauter	Richard Childress Racing	Chevrolet	28.572	188.996
38	45	Kyle Petty	Petty Enterprises	Dodge	28.581	188.937
Provisionals
39	49	Ken Schrader	BAM Racing	Dodge	28.591	188.871
40	32	Ricky Craven	PPI Motorsports	Chevrolet	29.164	185.160
41	15	Michael Waltrip	Dale Earnhardt, Inc.	Chevrolet	28.847	187.195
42	4	Jimmy Spencer	Morgan–McClure Motorsports	Chevrolet	28.812	187.422
43	72	Kirk Shelmerdine	Kirk Shelmerdine Racing	Ford	30.017	179.898
Failed to qualify or withdrew
44	84	Kyle Busch	Hendrick Motorsports	Chevrolet	28.695	188.186
45	89	Morgan Shepherd	Shepherd Racing Ventures	Dodge	28.883	186.961
46	80	Andy Hillenburg	Hover Motorsports	Ford	29.511	182.983
47	02	Andy Belmont	SCORE Motorsports	Pontiac	—	—
WD	94	Stanton Barrett	W. W. Motorsports	Chevrolet	—	—
Official qualifying results

== Race results ==
Fin	St	#	Driver	Team	Make	Laps	Led	Status	Pts	Winnings
1	19	38	Elliott Sadler	Robert Yates Racing	Ford	334	48	running	185	$507,733
2	3	9	Kasey Kahne	Evernham Motorsports	Dodge	334	148	running	180	$335,550
3	9	24	Jeff Gordon	Hendrick Motorsports	Chevrolet	334	47	running	170	$253,178
4	7	8	Dale Earnhardt Jr.	Dale Earnhardt, Inc.	Chevrolet	334	4	running	165	$227,653
5	10	2	Rusty Wallace	Penske-Jasper Racing	Dodge	334	2	running	160	$174,883
6	12	97	Kurt Busch	Roush Racing	Ford	334	1	running	155	$147,050
7	6	41	Casey Mears	Chip Ganassi Racing	Dodge	334	0	running	146	$117,875
8	17	20	Tony Stewart	Joe Gibbs Racing	Chevrolet	334	0	running	142	$156,453
9	8	48	Jimmie Johnson	Hendrick Motorsports	Chevrolet	334	0	running	138	$126,475
10	26	42	Jamie McMurray	Chip Ganassi Racing	Dodge	334	0	running	134	$114,150
11	20	23	Dave Blaney	Bill Davis Racing	Dodge	334	0	running	130	$101,950
12	13	25	Brian Vickers	Hendrick Motorsports	Chevrolet	333	0	running	127	$107,950
13	22	29	Kevin Harvick	Richard Childress Racing	Chevrolet	333	0	running	124	$135,153
14	5	01	Joe Nemechek	MBV Motorsports	Chevrolet	333	33	running	126	$104,925
15	24	10	Scott Riggs	MBV Motorsports	Chevrolet	332	0	running	118	$121,712
16	25	17	Matt Kenseth	Roush Racing	Ford	332	0	running	115	$145,103
17	28	6	Mark Martin	Roush Racing	Ford	332	0	running	112	$100,425
18	11	88	Dale Jarrett	Robert Yates Racing	Ford	332	0	running	109	$121,842
19	39	49	Ken Schrader	BAM Racing	Dodge	332	0	running	106	$89,425
20	41	15	Michael Waltrip	Dale Earnhardt, Inc.	Chevrolet	332	0	running	103	$124,981
21	38	45	Kyle Petty	Petty Enterprises	Dodge	332	1	running	105	$87,375
22	29	21	Ricky Rudd	Wood Brothers Racing	Ford	332	0	running	97	$110,981
23	18	31	Robby Gordon	Richard Childress Racing	Chevrolet	331	0	running	94	$119,537
24	37	30	Johnny Sauter	Richard Childress Racing	Chevrolet	331	1	running	96	$89,925
25	1	18	Bobby Labonte	Joe Gibbs Racing	Chevrolet	330	5	running	93	$139,908
26	14	40	Sterling Marlin	Chip Ganassi Racing	Dodge	330	18	running	90	$111,925
27	23	99	Jeff Burton	Roush Racing	Ford	330	0	running	82	$110,842
28	40	32	Ricky Craven	PPI Motorsports	Chevrolet	330	0	running	79	$83,925
29	42	4	Jimmy Spencer	Morgan–McClure Motorsports	Chevrolet	328	0	running	76	$74,825
30	35	14	Larry Foyt	A. J. Foyt Enterprises	Dodge	327	0	running	48	$74,175
31	4	16	Greg Biffle	Roush Racing	Ford	318	0	engine	70	$79,775
32	27	0	Ward Burton	Haas CNC Racing	Chevrolet	304	0	running	67	$70,675
33	32	22	Scott Wimmer	Bill Davis Racing	Dodge	294	0	crash	64	$78,500
34	21	19	Jeremy Mayfield	Evernham Motorsports	Dodge	293	0	crash	61	$76,475
35	33	43	Jeff Green	Petty Enterprises	Dodge	290	0	engine	58	$93,625
36	2	91	Bill Elliott	Evernham Motorsports	Dodge	273	26	crash	60	$72,350
37	31	50	Derrike Cope	Arnold Motorsports	Dodge	232	0	driveshaft	52	$65,125
38	16	77	Brendan Gaughan	Penske-Jasper Racing	Dodge	230	0	engine	49	$72,000
39	15	12	Ryan Newman	Penske-Jasper Racing	Dodge	194	0	crash	46	$110,742
40	34	09	Johnny Benson Jr.	Phoenix Racing	Dodge	151	0	rear end	43	$63,750
41	30	5	Terry Labonte	Hendrick Motorsports	Chevrolet	119	0	engine	40	$90,385
42	43	72	Kirk Shelmerdine	Kirk Shelmerdine Racing	Ford	8	0	handling	37	$63,525
43	36	98	Todd Bodine	Mach 1 Motorsports	Ford	5	0	engine	34	$63,634
Official race results

Previous race: 2004 Food City 500	NASCAR Nextel Cup Series; 2004 season	Next race: 2004 Advance Auto Parts 500
