= 2004 EA Sports 500 =

29th race of 2004 NASCAR Nextel Cup

Race details
- Race 29 of 36 in the 2004 NASCAR Nextel Cup Series
- 2004 EA Sports 500 program cover, based on the cover for the NASCAR 2005: Chase for the Cup video game
- Date: October 3, 2004
- Official name: EA Sports 500
- Location: Talladega, Alabama, U.S.
- Course: Talladega Superspeedway
- Course length: 2.66 miles (4.28 km)
- Distance: 188 laps, 500.08 mi (804.801 km)
- Average speed: 156.929 miles per hour (252.553 km/h)
- Attendance: 150,000

Pole position
| Driver | Joe Nemechek | MB2 Motorsports |
- Time: 50.202 sec (190.749 mph, 306.981 km/h)

Most laps led
| Driver | Dale Earnhardt Jr. | Dale Earnhardt, Inc. |
- Laps: 78

Winner
| No. 8 | Dale Earnhardt Jr. | Dale Earnhardt, Inc. |

Television in the United States
- Network: NBC
- Announcers: Bill Weber, Benny Parsons, Wally Dallenbach Jr.

The 2004 EA Sports 500 was a NASCAR Nextel Cup Series race that took place on October 3, 2004, at Talladega Superspeedway in Talladega, Alabama. It was the 29th race of the 2004 NASCAR Nextel Cup Series and the third in the ten-race, season-ending Chase for the Nextel Cup.

== Results ==
| Fin | St | # | Driver | Sponsor | Make | Laps | Led | Status | Pts |
|---|---|---|---|---|---|---|---|---|---|
| 1 | 10 | 8 | Dale Earnhardt Jr. | Budweiser | Chevy | 188 | 78 | running | 165 |
| 2 | 15 | 29 | Kevin Harvick | GM Goodwrench | Chevy | 188 | 3 | running | 175 |
| 3 | 3 | 88 | Dale Jarrett | UPS | Ford | 188 | 0 | running | 165 |
| 4 | 26 | 77 | Brendan Gaughan | Kodak, Jasper Engines & Transmissions | Dodge | 188 | 7 | running | 165 |
| 5 | 8 | 97 | Kurt Busch | Sharpie, Irwin Industrial Tools | Ford | 188 | 4 | running | 160 |
| 6 | 30 | 20 | Tony Stewart | Home Depot | Chevy | 188 | 4 | running | 155 |
| 7 | 1 | 01 | Joe Nemechek | U.S. Army | Chevy | 188 | 1 | running | 151 |
| 8 | 34 | 41 | Casey Mears | Target | Dodge | 188 | 5 | running | 147 |
| 9 | 36 | 31 | Robby Gordon | Cingular Wireless | Chevy | 188 | 0 | running | 138 |
| 10 | 28 | 0 | Ward Burton | NetZero Hi Speed, Shark Tale | Chevy | 188 | 1 | running | 139 |
| 11 | 4 | 10 | Scott Riggs | Zerex, Valvoline | Chevy | 188 | 1 | running | 135 |
| 12 | 2 | 21 | Ricky Rudd | Motorcraft, Rent-A-Center | Ford | 188 | 0 | running | 127 |
| 13 | 13 | 30 | Jeff Burton | America Online | Chevy | 188 | 6 | running | 129 |
| 14 | 7 | 17 | Matt Kenseth | Smirnoff Ice, DeWalt | Ford | 188 | 0 | running | 121 |
| 15 | 17 | 6 | Mark Martin | Viagra | Ford | 188 | 0 | running | 118 |
| 16 | 19 | 12 | Ryan Newman | Alltel | Dodge | 188 | 1 | running | 120 |
| 17 | 24 | 42 | Jamie McMurray | Texaco, Havoline | Dodge | 188 | 0 | running | 112 |
| 18 | 41 | 09 | Mike Wallace | Miccosukee Gaming & Resorts | Dodge | 188 | 4 | running | 114 |
| 19 | 5 | 24 | Jeff Gordon | DuPont | Chevy | 188 | 12 | running | 111 |
| 20 | 37 | 49 | Ken Schrader | Schwan's Home Service | Dodge | 188 | 1 | running | 108 |
| 21 | 38 | 5 | Terry Labonte | Kellogg's, Delphi | Chevy | 188 | 0 | running | 100 |
| 22 | 6 | 38 | Elliott Sadler | M&M's | Ford | 188 | 1 | running | 102 |
| 23 | 11 | 02 | Hermie Sadler | East Tennessee Trailers | Ford | 188 | 1 | running | 99 |
| 24 | 22 | 33 | Kerry Earnhardt | Bass Pro Shops, Tracker Boats | Chevy | 188 | 0 | running | 91 |
| 25 | 14 | 15 | Michael Waltrip | NAPA Auto Parts | Chevy | 188 | 7 | running | 93 |
| 26 | 33 | 2 | Rusty Wallace | Miller Lite | Dodge | 188 | 15 | running | 90 |
| 27 | 23 | 9 | Kasey Kahne | Dodge Dealers, UAW | Dodge | 187 | 0 | running | 57 |
| 28 | 12 | 16 | Greg Biffle | National Guard, Subway | Ford | 187 | 0 | running | 54 |
| 29 | 35 | 45 | Kyle Petty | Georgia-Pacific, Brawny | Dodge | 187 | 0 | running | 76 |
| 30 | 20 | 11 | Ricky Craven | Old Spice | Chevy | 187 | 0 | running | 73 |
| 31 | 29 | 22 | Scott Wimmer | Caterpillar | Dodge | 187 | 0 | running | 70 |
| 32 | 43 | 1 | Kenny Wallace | Aaron's | Chevy | 185 | 0 | running | 67 |
| 33 | 42 | 98 | Larry Gunselman | Mach One Inc. | Ford | 183 | 0 | running | 64 |
| 34 | 32 | 40 | Sterling Marlin | Coors Light, Rascal Flatts | Dodge | 178 | 0 | crash | 61 |
| 35 | 27 | 18 | Bobby Labonte | Interstate Batteries | Chevy | 178 | 0 | crash | 58 |
| 36 | 21 | 25 | Brian Vickers | GMAC Financial Services | Chevy | 164 | 0 | overheating | 55 |
| 37 | 16 | 48 | Jimmie Johnson | Lowe's | Chevy | 157 | 35 | engine | 57 |
| 38 | 9 | 19 | Jeremy Mayfield | Dodge Dealers, UAW | Dodge | 147 | 0 | crash | 49 |
| 39 | 18 | 43 | Jeff Green | Cheerios, Betty Crocker | Dodge | 142 | 0 | crash | 46 |
| 40 | 40 | 4 | Jimmy Spencer | Lucas Oil | Chevy | 142 | 1 | crash | 48 |
| 41 | 31 | 06 | Chad Blount | Mobil 1 | Dodge | 131 | 0 | engine | 40 |
| 42 | 25 | 99 | Carl Edwards | Roush Racing | Ford | 122 | 0 | engine | 37 |
| 43 | 39 | 32 | Bobby Hamilton Jr. | Tide | Chevy | 120 | 0 | crash | 34 |
Failed or qualify or driver change
| POS | NAME | NBR | SPONSOR | OWNER | CAR | | | | |
| 44 | Kevin Lepage | 37 | Carter's Royal Dispos-all | John Carter | Dodge | | | | |
| 45 | Kirk Shelmerdine | 72 | Vote for Bush | Kirk Shelmerdine | Ford | | | | |
| 46 | Carl Long | 80 | Commercial Truck & Trailer | Stan Hover | Ford | | | | |
| DC | Dave Blaney | 99 | Roush Racing | Jack Roush | Ford | | | | |

== Profanity controversy ==
Following the race, Earnhardt Jr. was asked about the importance of his then-fifth win at Talladega, to which he replied, "It don't mean shit right now. Daddy's won here 10 times." He was fined $10,000 and docked 25 driver points for the violation; without the penalty, he would have still finished fifth in that year's championship, finishing only six points behind Mark Martin for fourth.

Earlier in the year, NASCAR president Mike Helton warned drivers to not use profanity during radio and television interviews (in light of the Super Bowl XXXVIII halftime show controversy). A similar penalty was delivered to Johnny Sauter after he swore during a radio interview that occurred after a Busch Series race at Las Vegas in March, as well as Ron Hornaday Jr. for comments following a Busch race at Dover in June.
