= 2004 UAW-DaimlerChrysler 400 =

NASCAR Nextel Cup Series race

Race details
- Race 3 of 36 in the 2004 NASCAR Nextel Cup Series season
- 2004 UAW-DaimlerChrysler 400 program cover
- Date: March 7, 2004
- Official name: UAW-DaimlerChrysler 400
- Location: Las Vegas Motor Speedway, Las Vegas, Nevada
- Course: Permanent racing facility
- Course length: 1.5 miles (2.414 km)
- Distance: 267 laps, 400.5 mi (644.542 km)
- Average speed: 128.79 miles per hour (207.27 km/h)

Pole position
Driver	Kasey Kahne	Evernham Motorsports

Most laps led
Driver	Matt Kenseth	Roush Racing
- Laps: 123

Winner
No. 17	Matt Kenseth	Roush Racing

Television in the United States
- Network: Fox

The 2004 UAW-DaimlerChrysler 400 was a NASCAR Nextel Cup Series race held on March 7, 2004, at Las Vegas Motor Speedway in Las Vegas, Nevada. Contested at 267 laps on the 1.5-mile (2.4 km) speedway, it was the third race of the 2004 NASCAR Nextel Cup Series season. Matt Kenseth of Roush Racing won the race.

This race was the debut of future two-time Cup Series champion Kyle Busch.

== Entry list ==
- (W) denotes past winner of the race (in some iteration, has been run since 1998).
- (R) denotes rookie driver.
- (i) denotes driver who are ineligible for series driver points.

No.	Driver	Team	Manufacturer
0	Ward Burton	Haas CNC Racing	Chevrolet
01	Joe Nemechek	MBV Motorsports	Chevrolet
02	Carl Long	SCORE Motorsports	Pontiac
2	Rusty Wallace	Penske-Jasper Racing	Dodge
4	Kevin Lepage	Morgan-McClure Motorsports	Chevrolet
5	Terry Labonte	Hendrick Motorsports	Chevrolet
6	Mark Martin (W)	Roush Racing	Ford
8	Dale Earnhardt Jr.	Dale Earnhardt, Inc.	Chevrolet
9	Kasey Kahne (R)	Evernham Motorsports	Dodge
09	Johnny Benson Jr.	Phoenix Racing	Dodge
10	Scott Riggs (R)	MBV Motorsports	Chevrolet
12	Ryan Newman	Penske-Jasper Racing	Dodge
15	Michael Waltrip	Dale Earnhardt, Inc.	Chevrolet
16	Greg Biffle	Roush Racing	Ford
17	Matt Kenseth (W)	Roush Racing	Ford
18	Bobby Labonte	Joe Gibbs Racing	Chevrolet
19	Jeremy Mayfield	Evernham Motorsports	Dodge
20	Tony Stewart	Joe Gibbs Racing	Chevrolet
21	Ricky Rudd	Wood Brothers Racing	Ford
22	Scott Wimmer (R)	Bill Davis Racing	Dodge
24	Jeff Gordon (W)	Hendrick Motorsports	Chevrolet
25	Brian Vickers (R)	Hendrick Motorsports	Chevrolet
29	Kevin Harvick	Richard Childress Racing	Chevrolet
30	Johnny Sauter	Richard Childress Racing	Chevrolet
31	Robby Gordon	Richard Childress Racing	Chevrolet
32	Ricky Craven	PPI Motorsports	Chevrolet
38	Elliott Sadler	Robert Yates Racing	Ford
40	Sterling Marlin (W)	Chip Ganassi Racing	Dodge
41	Casey Mears	Chip Ganassi Racing	Dodge
42	Jamie McMurray	Chip Ganassi Racing	Dodge
43	Jeff Green	Petty Enterprises	Dodge
45	Kyle Petty	Petty Enterprises	Dodge
48	Jimmie Johnson	Hendrick Motorsports	Chevrolet
49	Ken Schrader	BAM Racing	Dodge
50	Derrike Cope	Arnold Motorsports	Dodge
72	Kirk Shelmerdine	Kirk Shelmerdine Racing	Ford
77	Brendan Gaughan (R)	Penske-Jasper Racing	Dodge
84	Kyle Busch	Hendrick Motorsports	Chevrolet
88	Dale Jarrett	Robert Yates Racing	Ford
89	Morgan Shepherd	Shepherd Racing Ventures	Dodge
91	Bill Elliott	Evernham Motorsports	Dodge
97	Kurt Busch	Roush Racing	Ford
99	Jeff Burton (W)	Roush Racing	Ford

Larry Gunselman failed to qualify while John Andretti, Larry Foyt, and Andy Hillenburg all withdrew.

== Qualifying ==
1. Kasey Kahne *#9 Dodge Dealers/UAW Dodge Evernham Motorsports 174.904 mph

2. Kurt Busch #97 IRWIN Industrial Tools Ford Roush Racing 174.548 mph

3. Brian Vickers * #25 GMAC Financial Services Chevrolet Hendrick Motorsports 174.537 mph

4. Jamie McMurray #42 Texaco Havoline Dodge Chip Ganassi Racing 174.436 mph

5. Ryan Newman #12 ALLTEL Dodge Penske Racing 174.340 mph

6. Jeremy Mayfield #19 Dodge Dealers/UAW Dodge Evernham Motorsports 174.267 mph

7. Bobby Labonte #18 Interstate Batteries Chevrolet Joe Gibbs Racing 173.863 mph

8. Brendan Gaughan * #77 Kodak Easyshare Dodge Penske/Jasper Racing 173.824 mph

9. Greg Biffle #16 National Guard Ford Roush Racing 173.807 mph

10. Bill Elliott #91 UAW-National Training Center Dodge Evernham Motorsports 173.768 mph

11. Elliott Sadler #38 M&M's Ford Robert Yates Racing 173.740 mph

12. Jimmie Johnson #48 Lowe's Chevrolet Hendrick Motorsports 173.444 mph

13. Casey Mears #41 Target DodgeChip Ganassi Racing 173.405 mph

14. Michael Waltrip #15 NAPA Auto Parts Chevrolet Dale Earnhardt Incorporated 173.266 mph

15. Scott Riggs * #10 Valvoline Chevrolet MBV Motorsports 173.066 mph

16. Kevin Harvick #29 GM Goodwrench Chevrolet Richard Childress Racing 173.010 mph

17. Ricky Craven #32 Tide Chevrolet PPI Motorsports 172.983 mph

18. Kyle Busch #84 CARQUEST Chevrolet Hendrick Motorsports 172.955 mph

19. Tony Stewart #20 Home Depot Chevrolet Joe Gibbs Racing 172.728 mph

20. Jeff Gordon #24 Dupont Chevrolet Hendrick Motorsports 172.469 mph

21. Rusty Wallace #2 Miller Lite Dodge Penske Racing 172.403 mph

22. Robby Gordon #31 Cingular Wireless Chevrolet Richard Childress Racing 172.150 mph

23. Sterling Marlin #40 Coors Light Dodge Chip Ganassi Racing 171.996 mph

24. Jeff Green #43 Lucky Charms Dodge Petty Enterprises 171.750 mph

25. Matt Kenseth #17 DeWalt Power Tools Ford Roush Racing 171.679 mph

26. Dale Earnhardt Jr. #8 Budweiser Chevrolet Dale Earnhardt Incorporated 171.516 mph

27. Mark Martin # 6 Viagra Ford Roush Racing 171.505 mph

28. Jeff Burton #99 Pennzoil Ford Roush Racing 171.483 mph

29. Dale Jarrett #88 UPS Ford Robert Yates Racing 171.423 mph

30. Johnny Sauter * # 30 AOL/IMAX NASCAR 3D Chevrolet Richard Childress Racing 171.358 mph

31. Ken Schrader #49 Schwan's Home Service Dodge BAM Racing 171.352 mph

32. Kyle Petty #45 Georgia Pacific/Brawny Dodge Petty Enterprises 171.146 mph

33. Ricky Rudd #21 Motorcraft Ford Wood Brothers Racing 171.130 mph

34. Ward Burton # 0 Netzero HiSpeed Chevrolet Haas CNC Racing 170.783 mph

35. Kevin Lepage #4 YokeTV.com Chevrolet Morgan-McClure Racing 170.444 mph

36. Johnny Benson #09 Miccosukee Gaming & Resorts Dodge Phoenix Racing 170.401 mph

37. Terry Labonte #5 Kellogg's ChevroletHendrick Motorsports 170.304 mph

38. Joe Nemechek #01 USG Sheetrock Chevrolet MB2 Motorsports 169.977 mph

39. Scott Wimmer * #22 Caterpillar Dodge Bill Davis Racing 169.673 mph (provisional)

40. Carl Long #02 RacingJUNK.com Pontiac SCORE Motorsports 163.701 mph (provisional)

41. Derrike Cope #50 redneckjunk.com Dodge Derrike Cope 169.311 mph (provisional)

42. Morgan Shephard #89 Voyles/Carter's Royal Disposall Ford Cindy Shephard 164.986 mph (provisional)

43. Kirk Shelmerdine #72 Freddie B's/Tucson Ford Kirk Shelmerdine 163.320 mph (provisional)

Did not qualify

44. Larry Gunselman #98 Lucas Oil Products Ford William Chris Edwards 161.103 mph

== Summary ==
The UAW-DaimlerChrysler 400 was run on Sunday, March 7, 2004, over 267 laps at the Las Vegas Motor Speedway in Las Vegas, Nevada.

Four drivers were sent to the rear of the field due to engine changes: Ward Burton, Kevin Lepage, Jeff Gordon, and Derrike Cope.

Rookie Kasey Kahne started on the pole, though Kurt Busch, who started second, took the lead shortly after and held it for the race's first four laps. Kahne took the lead back on lap 5 and held it under green for thirty-one laps. On lap 36, the lead was taken by Jimmie Johnson, who held it for five laps before the race's first caution came on lap 40 for oil on the track. Scott Riggs led one lap under caution, though Kahne led the pack back to the restart. Tony Stewart took the lead from Kahne on lap 54; he held this lead for thirty-five laps under green. On lap 88, an accident in turn four involving Ryan Newman brought out the race's second caution. The race restarted on lap 93, with Stewart holding the lead for the first two laps under green and Matt Kenseth overtaking him to lead lap 95. Kenseth remained in first place for forty-four laps until the third caution of the race, brought about by a crash, in turn, two by Jeff Green's #43 car. The race restarted on lap 143 and remained under green for another twenty-three laps, all of which were led by Kenseth. The fourth caution, which happened on lap 166, was caused by a crash in turn four involving Michael Waltrip's #15 car. Tony Stewart retook the lead under caution, but the restart (lap 173) was led by Kenseth, who led the next twelve laps under green. The fifth caution of the race was brought out due to another instance of oil on the track; the yellow flag was displayed on lap 184. Jeff Burton led one lap under caution, and Kevin Harvick led the field to the restart on lap 193. He led until the race's sixth and final caution due to debris. Harvick maintained the lead for the restart on lap 207 and held it for another twenty-seven lap laps before losing it under green to Kenseth. The #17 car remained the race leader for the last thirty-eight laps, all under green, to win the UAW-DaimlerChrysler 400 for the second year in a row.

== Race results ==
The top ten finishers are listed below.

POS	ST	#	DRIVER	SPONSOR / OWNER	CAR	LAPS	MONEY	STATUS	LED	PTS
1	25	17	Matt Kenseth	DeWalt Power Tools (Jack Roush)	Ford	267	458828	running	123	190
2	1	9	Kasey Kahne	Dodge Dealers / UAW Daimler-Chrysler 400 (Ray Evernham)	Dodge	267	260775	running	43	175
3	19	20	Tony Stewart	Home Depot (Joe Gibbs)	Chevrolet	267	219603	running	45	170
4	4	42	Jamie McMurray	Texaco / Havoline (Chip Ganassi)	Dodge	267	150925	running	0	160
5	27	6	Mark Martin	Viagra (Jack Roush)	Ford	267	127875	running	0	155
6	11	38	Elliott Sadler	M&M's Black & White (Yates Racing)	Ford	267	131808	running	0	150
7	13	41	Casey Mears	Target (Chip Ganassi)	Dodge	267	117050	running	0	146
8	7	18	Bobby Labonte	Interstate Batteries (Joe Gibbs)	Chevrolet	267	136583	running	0	142
9	2	97	Kurt Busch	Irwin Tools / Sharpie (Jack Roush)	Ford	267	108500	running	4	143
10	21	2	Rusty Wallace	Miller Lite "Great Moments" (Roger Penske)	Dodge	267	129108	running	0	134
11	29	88	Dale Jarrett	UPS (Yates Racing)	Ford	267	120492	running	0	130
12	32	45	Kyle Petty	Georgia-Pacific / Brawny (Petty Enterprises)	Dodge	267	101275	running	0	127
13	28	99	Jeff Burton	Pennzoil (Jack Roush)	Ford	267	119417	running	1	129
14	6	19	Jeremy Mayfield	Dodge Dealers / UAW Daimler-Chrysler 400 (Ray Evernham)	Dodge	267	104950	running	0	121
15	20	24	Jeff Gordon	DuPont (Rick Hendrick)	Chevrolet	267	128128	running	0	118
16	12	48	Jimmie Johnson	Lowe's (Rick Hendrick)	Chevrolet	267	98050	running	5	120
17	37	5	Terry Labonte	Got Milk? / Kellogg's (Rick Hendrick)	Chevrolet	267	107600	running	0	112
18	23	40	Sterling Marlin	Coors Light (Chip Ganassi)	Dodge	266	112750	running	0	109
19	38	01	Joe Nemechek	USG Sheetrock (Nelson Bowers)	Chevrolet	266	97150	running	0	106
20	10	91	Bill Elliott	UAW Daimler-Chrysler 400 (Ray Evernham)	Dodge	266	76200	running	0	103
21	16	29	Kevin Harvick	GM Goodwrench (Richard Childress)	Chevrolet	266	112328	running	43	105
22	8	77	Brendan Gaughan	Kodak Easy Share (Doug Bawel)	Dodge	266	83450	running	0	97
23	3	25	Brian Vickers	GMAC Financial Services (Rick Hendrick)	Chevrolet	266	83275	running	0	94
24	30	30	Johnny Sauter	AOL / NASCAR IMAX 3D (Richard Childress)	Chevrolet	266	73250	running	0	91
25	17	32	Ricky Craven	Tide (Cal Wells)	Chevrolet	265	89039	running	1	93
26	34	0	Ward Burton	NetZero Hi Speed (Gene Haas)	Chevrolet	265	70750	running	0	85
27	5	12	Ryan Newman	Alltel (Roger Penske)	Dodge	265	114117	running	0	82
28	33	21	Ricky Rudd	Motorcraft (Wood Brothers)	Ford	264	92306	running	0	79
29	15	10	Scott Riggs	Valvoline (James Rocco)	Chevrolet	264	91237	running	1	81
30	22	31	Robby Gordon	Cingular Wireless (Richard Childress)	Chevrolet	264	101487	running	0	73
31	36	09	Johnny Benson Jr.	Miccosukee Gaming & Resorts (James Finch)	Dodge	263	65600	running	0	70
32	31	49	Ken Schrader	Schwan's Home Service (Beth Ann Morgenthau)	Dodge	263	65400	running	0	67
33	40	50	Derrike Cope	redneckjunk.com (Don Arnold)	Dodge	262	66125	running	0	64
34	24	43	Jeff Green	Lucky Charms / General Mills (Petty Enterprises)	Dodge	200	91250	crash	0	61
35	26	8	Dale Earnhardt Jr.	Budweiser (Dale Earnhardt, Inc.)	Chevrolet	196	111978	handling	0	58
36	35	4	Kevin Lepage	YokeTV.com (Larry McClure)	Chevrolet	182	64600	engine	0	55
37	14	15	Michael Waltrip	NAPA (Dale Earnhardt, Inc.)	Chevrolet	163	100431	crash	1	57
38	41	02	Carl Long	RacingJunk.com (Hermie Sadler)	Pontiac	145	64175	oil pump	0	49
39	39	22	Scott Wimmer	Caterpillar (Bill Davis)	Dodge	37	71975	engine	0	46
40	9	16	Greg Biffle	National Guard / Subway (Jack Roush)	Ford	23	71750	engine	0	43
41	18	84	Kyle Busch	Carquest (Rick Hendrick)	Chevrolet	11	63555	crash	0	40
42	43	89	Morgan Shepherd	Racing With Jesus / Voyles Equipment Co. (Morgan Shepherd)	Dodge	9	63375	overheating	0	37
43	42	72	Kirk Shelmerdine	Kirk Shelmedine Racing (Kirk Shelmerdine)	Ford	8	63413	engine	0	34
Failed to qualify or withdrew
POS	NAME	NBR	SPONSOR	OWNER	CAR					
44	Larry Gunselman	98	Lucas Oil Products	William Edwards	Ford					
WD	John Andretti	1	Snap-On Tools	Dale Earnhardt, Inc.	Chevrolet					
WD	Larry Foyt	14	Foyt Racing	A.J. Foyt	Dodge					
WD	Andy Hillenburg	80	Commercial Truck & Trailer	Stan Hover	Ford					

== Race Statistics ==
- Time of race: 3:06:35
- Average Speed: 128.79 miles per hour (207.27 km/h)
- Pole Speed: 174.904 miles per hour (281.481 km/h)
- Cautions: 6 for 37 laps
- Margin of Victory: 3.426 sec
- Lead changes: 18
- Percent of race run under caution: 13.9%
- Average green flag run: 32.9 laps

Previous race: 2004 Subway 400	Nextel Cup Series; 2004 season	Next race: 2004 Golden Corral 500
