= 2005 Subway 500 =

Race details
- Race 32 of 36 in the 2005 NASCAR Nextel Cup Series
- Date: October 23, 2005
- Official name: 57th Annual Subway 500
- Location: Martinsville, Virginia, Martinsville Speedway
- Course: Permanent racing facility
- Course length: 0.526 miles (0.847 km)
- Distance: 500 laps, 263 mi (423.257 km)
- Average speed: 69.695 miles per hour (112.163 km/h)
- Attendance: 72,000

Pole position
Driver	Tony Stewart	Joe Gibbs Racing
- Time: 19.306

Most laps led
Driver	Tony Stewart	Joe Gibbs Racing
- Laps: 283

Winner
No. 24	Jeff Gordon	Hendrick Motorsports

Television in the United States
- Network: NBC
- Announcers: Bill Weber, Benny Parsons, Wally Dallenbach Jr.

Radio in the United States
- Radio: Motor Racing Network

The 2005 Subway 500 was the 32nd stock car racing race of the 2005 NASCAR Nextel Cup Series season, the sixth race of the 2005 Chase for the Nextel Cup, and the 57th iteration of the event. The race was held on Sunday, October 23, before a crowd of 72,000 in Martinsville, Virginia at Martinsville Speedway, a 0.526 miles (0.847 km) permanent oval-shaped short track. The race took the scheduled 500 laps to complete. At race's end, Jeff Gordon of Hendrick Motorsports would hold off the field on the final restart with three to go to take his 73rd career NASCAR Nextel Cup Series win and his fourth and final win of the season, completing a Martinsville sweep. To fill out the podium, Tony Stewart of Joe Gibbs Racing and Jimmie Johnson of Hendrick Motorsports would finish second and third, respectively.

== Background ==
The layout of Martinsville Speedway, the venue where the race was held.

Martinsville Speedway is a NASCAR-owned stock car racing track located in Henry County, in Ridgeway, Virginia, just to the south of Martinsville. At 0.526 miles (0.847 km) in length, it is the shortest track in the NASCAR Cup Series. The track was also one of the first paved oval tracks in NASCAR, being built in 1947 by H. Clay Earles. It is also the only remaining race track that has been on the NASCAR circuit from its beginning in 1948.

#	Driver	Team	Make
0	Mike Bliss	Haas CNC Racing	Chevrolet
00	Carl Long	McGlynn Racing	Chevrolet
01	Joe Nemechek	MB2 Motorsports	Chevrolet
2	Rusty Wallace	Penske Racing	Dodge
4	Mike Wallace	Morgan–McClure Motorsports	Chevrolet
5	Kyle Busch	Hendrick Motorsports	Chevrolet
6	Mark Martin	Roush Racing	Ford
7	Robby Gordon	Robby Gordon Motorsports	Chevrolet
07	Dave Blaney	Richard Childress Racing	Chevrolet
8	Dale Earnhardt Jr.	Dale Earnhardt, Inc.	Chevrolet
08	Derrike Cope	McGlynn Racing	Chevrolet
9	Kasey Kahne	Evernham Motorsports	Dodge
09	Bobby Hamilton	Phoenix Racing	Dodge
10	Scott Riggs	MBV Motorsports	Chevrolet
11	Denny Hamlin	Joe Gibbs Racing	Chevrolet
12	Ryan Newman	Penske Racing	Dodge
15	Michael Waltrip	Dale Earnhardt, Inc.	Chevrolet
16	Greg Biffle	Roush Racing	Ford
17	Matt Kenseth	Roush Racing	Ford
18	Bobby Labonte	Joe Gibbs Racing	Chevrolet
19	Jeremy Mayfield	Evernham Motorsports	Dodge
20	Tony Stewart	Joe Gibbs Racing	Chevrolet
21	Ricky Rudd	Wood Brothers Racing	Ford
22	Scott Wimmer	Bill Davis Racing	Dodge
24	Jeff Gordon	Hendrick Motorsports	Chevrolet
25	Brian Vickers	Hendrick Motorsports	Chevrolet
29	Kevin Harvick	Richard Childress Racing	Chevrolet
31	Jeff Burton	Richard Childress Racing	Chevrolet
32	Bobby Hamilton Jr.	PPI Motorsports	Chevrolet
34	Joey McCarthy	Mach 1 Motorsports	Chevrolet
37	Jimmy Spencer	R&J Racing	Dodge
38	Elliott Sadler	Robert Yates Racing	Ford
40	Sterling Marlin	Chip Ganassi Racing with Felix Sabates	Dodge
41	Casey Mears	Chip Ganassi Racing with Felix Sabates	Dodge
42	Jamie McMurray	Chip Ganassi Racing with Felix Sabates	Dodge
43	Jeff Green	Petty Enterprises	Dodge
45	Kyle Petty	Petty Enterprises	Dodge
48	Jimmie Johnson	Hendrick Motorsports	Chevrolet
49	Ken Schrader	BAM Racing	Dodge
61	Wayne Anderson	Buddy Sisco Racing	Dodge
66	Hermie Sadler	Peak Fitness Racing	Ford
75	Mike Garvey	Rinaldi Racing	Dodge
77	Travis Kvapil	Penske Racing	Dodge
88	Dale Jarrett	Robert Yates Racing	Ford
89	Morgan Shepherd	Shepherd Racing Ventures	Dodge
92	Chad Chaffin	Front Row Motorsports	Chevrolet
95	Stanton Barrett	Stanton Barrett Motorsports	Chevrolet
97	Kurt Busch	Roush Racing	Ford
99	Carl Edwards	Roush Racing	Ford
Official entry list

== Practice ==
=== First practice ===
The first practice session would occur on Friday, October 21, at 11:20 AM EST and would last for two hours. Tony Stewart of Joe Gibbs Racing would set the fastest time in the session, with 19.352 and an average speed of 97.850 miles per hour (157.474 km/h).

Pos.	#	Driver	Team	Make	Time	Speed
1	20	Tony Stewart	Joe Gibbs Racing	Chevrolet	19.352	97.850
2	21	Ricky Rudd	Wood Brothers Racing	Ford	19.365	97.785
3	12	Ryan Newman	Penske Racing	Dodge	19.399	97.613
Full first practice results

=== Second practice ===
The second practice session would occur on Saturday, October 22, at 9:30 AM EST and would last for 45 minutes. Jimmie Johnson of Hendrick Motorsports would set the fastest time in the session, with 19.583 and an average speed of 96.696 miles per hour (155.617 km/h).

Pos.	#	Driver	Team	Make	Time	Speed
1	48	Jimmie Johnson	Hendrick Motorsports	Chevrolet	19.583	96.696
2	20	Tony Stewart	Joe Gibbs Racing	Chevrolet	19.614	96.543
3	11	Denny Hamlin	Joe Gibbs Racing	Chevrolet	19.614	96.543
Full second practice results

=== Third and final practice ===
The third and final practice session, sometimes referred as Happy Hour, would occur on Saturday, October 22, at 11:10 AM EST and would last for 45 minutes. Denny Hamlin of Joe Gibbs Racing would set the fastest time in the session, with 19.548 and an average speed of 96.869 miles per hour (155.896 km/h).

Pos.	#	Driver	Team	Make	Time	Speed
1	11	Denny Hamlin	Joe Gibbs Racing	Chevrolet	19.548	96.869
2	8	Dale Earnhardt Jr.	Dale Earnhardt, Inc.	Chevrolet	19.672	96.259
3	21	Ricky Rudd	Wood Brothers Racing	Ford	19.681	96.215
Full Happy Hour practice results

== Qualifying ==
Qualifying would take place on Friday, October 21, at 3:10 PM EST. Each driver would have two laps to set a fastest time; the fastest of the two would count as their official qualifying lap.

Tony Stewart of Joe Gibbs Racing would win the pole, setting a time of 19.306 and an average speed of 98.084 miles per hour (157.851 km/h).

=== Full qualifying results ===
Pos.	#	Driver	Team	Make	Time	Speed
1	20	Tony Stewart	Joe Gibbs Racing	Chevrolet	19.306	98.084
2	21	Ricky Rudd	Wood Brothers Racing	Ford	19.324	97.992
3	2	Rusty Wallace	Penske Racing	Dodge	19.336	97.931
4	12	Ryan Newman	Penske Racing	Dodge	19.340	97.911
5	11	Denny Hamlin	Joe Gibbs Racing	Chevrolet	19.355	97.835
6	48	Jimmie Johnson	Hendrick Motorsports	Chevrolet	19.412	97.548
7	19	Jeremy Mayfield	Evernham Motorsports	Dodge	19.433	97.442
8	01	Joe Nemechek	MB2 Motorsports	Chevrolet	19.455	97.332
9	38	Elliott Sadler	Robert Yates Racing	Ford	19.463	97.292
10	18	Bobby Labonte	Joe Gibbs Racing	Chevrolet	19.479	97.212
11	43	Jeff Green	Petty Enterprises	Dodge	19.479	97.212
12	77	Travis Kvapil	Penske Racing	Dodge	19.520	97.008
13	45	Kyle Petty	Petty Enterprises	Dodge	19.536	96.929
14	97	Kurt Busch	Roush Racing	Ford	19.545	96.884
15	24	Jeff Gordon	Hendrick Motorsports	Chevrolet	19.549	96.864
16	41	Casey Mears	Chip Ganassi Racing with Felix Sabates	Dodge	19.552	96.849
17	25	Brian Vickers	Hendrick Motorsports	Chevrolet	19.555	96.835
18	99	Carl Edwards	Roush Racing	Ford	19.561	96.805
19	07	Dave Blaney	Richard Childress Racing	Chevrolet	19.587	96.676
20	8	Dale Earnhardt Jr.	Dale Earnhardt, Inc.	Chevrolet	19.588	96.671
21	31	Jeff Burton	Richard Childress Racing	Chevrolet	19.604	96.592
22	16	Greg Biffle	Roush Racing	Ford	19.616	96.533
23	5	Kyle Busch	Hendrick Motorsports	Chevrolet	19.627	96.479
24	49	Ken Schrader	BAM Racing	Dodge	19.628	96.474
25	17	Matt Kenseth	Roush Racing	Ford	19.640	96.415
26	10	Scott Riggs	MBV Motorsports	Chevrolet	19.665	96.293
27	4	Mike Wallace	Morgan–McClure Motorsports	Chevrolet	19.665	96.293
28	88	Dale Jarrett	Robert Yates Racing	Ford	19.677	96.234
29	29	Kevin Harvick	Richard Childress Racing	Chevrolet	19.691	96.166
30	42	Jamie McMurray	Chip Ganassi Racing with Felix Sabates	Dodge	19.694	96.151
31	0	Mike Bliss	Haas CNC Racing	Chevrolet	19.700	96.122
32	40	Sterling Marlin	Chip Ganassi Racing with Felix Sabates	Dodge	19.705	96.097
33	7	Robby Gordon	Robby Gordon Motorsports	Chevrolet	19.718	96.034
34	9	Kasey Kahne	Evernham Motorsports	Dodge	19.744	95.908
35	6	Mark Martin	Roush Racing	Ford	19.760	95.830
36	22	Scott Wimmer	Bill Davis Racing	Dodge	19.778	95.743
37	09	Bobby Hamilton	Phoenix Racing	Dodge	19.783	95.718
38	08	Derrike Cope	McGlynn Racing	Chevrolet	19.799	95.641
39	15	Michael Waltrip	Dale Earnhardt, Inc.	Chevrolet	19.858	95.357
40	37	Jimmy Spencer	R&J Racing	Dodge	19.877	95.266
41	66	Hermie Sadler	Peak Fitness Racing	Ford	19.883	95.237
42	95	Stanton Barrett	Stanton Barrett Motorsports	Chevrolet	19.890	95.204
43	32	Bobby Hamilton Jr.	PPI Motorsports	Chevrolet	19.917	95.075
Failed to qualify
44	92	Chad Chaffin	Front Row Motorsports	Chevrolet	19.923	95.046
45	34	Joey McCarthy	Mach 1 Motorsports	Chevrolet	20.217	93.664
46	00	Carl Long	McGlynn Racing	Dodge	20.260	93.465
47	75	Mike Garvey	Rinaldi Racing	Dodge	20.417	92.746
48	89	Morgan Shepherd	Shepherd Racing Ventures	Dodge	—	—
49	61	Wayne Anderson	Buddy Sisco Racing	Dodge	—	—
Official qualifying results

== Race results ==
Fin	St	#	Driver	Team	Make	Laps	Led	Status	Pts	Winnings
1	15	24	Jeff Gordon	Hendrick Motorsports	Chevrolet	500	151	running	185	$184,926
2	1	20	Tony Stewart	Joe Gibbs Racing	Chevrolet	500	283	running	180	$179,651
3	6	48	Jimmie Johnson	Hendrick Motorsports	Chevrolet	500	0	running	165	$136,441
4	10	18	Bobby Labonte	Joe Gibbs Racing	Chevrolet	500	0	running	160	$125,075
5	21	31	Jeff Burton	Richard Childress Racing	Chevrolet	500	0	running	155	$107,795
6	14	97	Kurt Busch	Roush Racing	Ford	500	0	running	150	$124,050
7	30	42	Jamie McMurray	Chip Ganassi Racing with Felix Sabates	Dodge	500	0	running	146	$90,775
8	5	11	Denny Hamlin	Joe Gibbs Racing	Chevrolet	500	0	running	142	$75,150
9	23	5	Kyle Busch	Hendrick Motorsports	Chevrolet	500	0	running	138	$83,650
10	4	12	Ryan Newman	Penske Racing	Dodge	500	0	running	134	$120,391
11	2	21	Ricky Rudd	Wood Brothers Racing	Ford	500	2	running	135	$103,064
12	25	17	Matt Kenseth	Roush Racing	Ford	500	19	running	132	$116,461
13	24	49	Ken Schrader	BAM Racing	Dodge	500	17	running	129	$71,525
14	13	45	Kyle Petty	Petty Enterprises	Dodge	500	0	running	121	$90,858
15	29	29	Kevin Harvick	Richard Childress Racing	Chevrolet	500	0	running	118	$115,986
16	19	07	Dave Blaney	Richard Childress Racing	Chevrolet	500	10	running	120	$78,600
17	34	9	Kasey Kahne	Evernham Motorsports	Dodge	500	0	running	112	$103,975
18	20	8	Dale Earnhardt Jr.	Dale Earnhardt, Inc.	Chevrolet	500	0	running	109	$113,483
19	3	2	Rusty Wallace	Penske Racing	Dodge	500	0	running	106	$101,083
20	22	16	Greg Biffle	Roush Racing	Ford	500	6	running	108	$85,275
21	12	77	Travis Kvapil	Penske Racing	Dodge	500	0	running	100	$76,525
22	16	41	Casey Mears	Chip Ganassi Racing with Felix Sabates	Dodge	499	0	running	97	$92,433
23	8	01	Joe Nemechek	MB2 Motorsports	Chevrolet	499	0	running	94	$91,133
24	26	10	Scott Riggs	MBV Motorsports	Chevrolet	499	0	running	91	$87,433
25	36	22	Scott Wimmer	Bill Davis Racing	Dodge	499	0	running	88	$85,047
26	18	99	Carl Edwards	Roush Racing	Ford	499	0	running	85	$82,650
27	39	15	Michael Waltrip	Dale Earnhardt, Inc.	Chevrolet	498	12	running	87	$94,299
28	7	19	Jeremy Mayfield	Evernham Motorsports	Dodge	497	0	running	79	$93,280
29	9	38	Elliott Sadler	Robert Yates Racing	Ford	497	0	running	76	$103,791
30	43	32	Bobby Hamilton Jr.	PPI Motorsports	Chevrolet	494	0	running	73	$66,725
31	28	88	Dale Jarrett	Robert Yates Racing	Ford	492	0	running	70	$97,783
32	41	66	Hermie Sadler	Peak Fitness Racing	Ford	489	0	running	67	$63,550
33	38	08	Derrike Cope	McGlynn Racing	Chevrolet	488	0	running	64	$64,375
34	35	6	Mark Martin	Roush Racing	Ford	468	0	running	61	$81,375
35	27	4	Mike Wallace	Morgan–McClure Motorsports	Chevrolet	448	0	running	58	$63,325
36	17	25	Brian Vickers	Hendrick Motorsports	Chevrolet	425	0	running	55	$71,275
37	11	43	Jeff Green	Petty Enterprises	Dodge	409	0	engine	52	$92,161
38	32	40	Sterling Marlin	Chip Ganassi Racing with Felix Sabates	Dodge	370	0	crash	49	$91,083
39	37	09	Bobby Hamilton	Phoenix Racing	Dodge	339	0	oil leak	46	$63,115
40	40	37	Jimmy Spencer	R&J Racing	Dodge	235	0	electrical	43	$63,065
41	31	0	Mike Bliss	Haas CNC Racing	Chevrolet	173	0	crash	40	$63,015
42	33	7	Robby Gordon	Robby Gordon Motorsports	Chevrolet	115	0	engine	37	$62,960
43	42	95	Stanton Barrett	Stanton Barrett Motorsports	Chevrolet	110	0	engine	34	$62,008
Failed to qualify
44		92	Chad Chaffin	Front Row Motorsports	Chevrolet					
45		34	Joey McCarthy	Mach 1 Motorsports	Chevrolet					
46		00	Carl Long	McGlynn Racing	Dodge					
47		75	Mike Garvey	Rinaldi Racing	Dodge					
48		89	Morgan Shepherd	Shepherd Racing Ventures	Dodge					
49		61	Wayne Anderson	Buddy Sisco Racing	Dodge					
Official race results

Previous race: 2005 UAW-GM Quality 500	NASCAR Nextel Cup Series; 2005 season	Next race: 2005 Bass Pro Shops MBNA 500
