= Joey McCarthy =

American racing driver

- Born: Joseph McCarthy; October 7, 1972 (age 54); Mendham Township, New Jersey, U.S.
- Achievements: 1987 New Jersey state karting champion

NASCAR Cup Series career
- 1 race run over 1 year
- Best finish: 77th (2005)
- First race: 2005 Sylvania 300 (Loudon)
Wins	Top tens	Poles
0	0	0

NASCAR O'Reilly Auto Parts Series career
- 9 races run over 4 years
- Best finish: 73rd (1997)
- First race: 1996 Meridian Advantage 200 (Nazareth)
- Last race: 2006 New England 200 (Loudon)
Wins	Top tens	Poles
0	0	0

NASCAR Busch East Series
- Years active: 1998–2006
- Starts: 100
- Wins: 1
- Poles: 1
- Best finish: 6th in 2003, 2006

Joseph McCarthy (born October 7, 1972) is an American professional stock car racing driver. He is a former competitor in the NASCAR Cup Series, NASCAR Busch Series (now Xfinity), NASCAR Truck Series, NASCAR Busch East Series (now ARCA East), and the NASCAR Winston Modified Tour (now the Whelen Modified Tour). He is also the 1987 New Jersey state champion in kart racing.

== Racing career ==
Starting his racing career at the age of ten, McCarthy made a name for himself in kart racing, winning the 1987 New Jersey State Karting Championship. He moved to stock car competition in 1991, competing at Flemington Speedway, where he won the track's rookie championship.

McCarthy made his debut in NASCAR touring series competition in 1994, competing in the Featherlite Modified Tour; he ran two events in the series with a best finish of 24th. In 1995 McCarthy moved to NASCAR's national touring series, making his first attempt to qualify in the Busch Series; he attempted two races but failed to qualify for either. He qualified for his first Busch Series race in 1996, competing at Nazareth Speedway and finishing 34th; McCarthy would make seven additional starts in the series over the next two years, with a best finish of 28th at Nazareth in 1997.

McCarthy began his career in the Busch North Series, a New England–based regional series running cars similar to those in the Busch Grand National series, in 1998; he became a regular on the season schedule in 2001, running for Rookie of the Year honors that year and finishing second in the rookie points standings. McCarthy scored his first and only win with J.T. Mase Motorsports with Jason Weissman as Crew Chief in the Busch North Series in 2003, at Holland International Speedway in Holland, New York. He also returned to the Whelen Modified Tour in 2003, competing at New Hampshire International Speedway and finishing 41st.

McCarthy competed in the Toyota All-Star Showdown between 2003 and 2006, representing the Busch North Series; he won a qualifying race for the 2003 event, finishing seventh in the main event; in 2004 he placed third in the Showdown's feature race.

In 2005, in addition to continuing to compete as a regular in the Busch North Series, McCarthy attempted to move up to the NASCAR Craftsman Truck Series; he attempted to qualify for the Kroger 250 at Martinsville Speedway, but failed to post a speed sufficient to qualify for the event. He also signed with Mach One Motorsports to drive the No. 34 Chevrolet on a limited schedule in the Nextel Cup Series; following several races for which he failed to qualify, McCarthy made the field for his first and only Cup race at New Hampshire Motor Speedway in the Sylvania 300, driving the No. 92 TrimSpa Dodge for Front Row Motorsports and finishing 31st in the event.

McCarthy returned to the Busch Series in 2006 for a single event, competing in the New England 200 at New Hampshire for Keith Coleman Racing and finishing 43rd; he failed to qualify for the weekend's Nextel Cup Series event, driving the No. 34 Chevrolet for Front Row Motorsports in his final attempt to race in NASCAR's top series. McCarthy tied his best career points finish in the renamed Busch East Series that year, finishing sixth in points; it would be his final season in the series.

In 2007, McCarthy could not find a ride in NASCAR as a driver and became a pit crew member for numerous teams in the following years. He was last known to be working for JTG Daugherty Racing in the Cup Series in 2011 as a crew member for their No. 47 car, at the time driven by Bobby Labonte.

== Motorsports career results ==
=== NASCAR ===
(key) (Bold – Pole position awarded by qualifying time. Italics – Pole position earned by points standings or practice time. * – Most laps led.)

==== Nextel Cup Series ====
NASCAR Nextel Cup Series results
Year	Team	No.	Make	1	2	3	4	5	6	7	8	9	10	11	12	13	14	15	16	17	18	19	20	21	22	23	24	25	26	27	28	29	30	31	32	33	34	35	36	NNCC	Pts	Ref
2005	Mach 1 Motorsports	34	Chevy	DAY	CAL	LVS	ATL	BRI	MAR	TEX	PHO	TAL	DAR	RCH	CLT	DOV	POC	MCH	SON	DAY	CHI	NHA; DNQ	POC	IND	GLN	MCH	BRI	CAL	RCH; DNQ		DOV; DNQ	TAL	KAN	CLT	MAR; DNQ	ATL	TEX	PHO	HOM	77th	70	
2005	Front Row Motorsports	92	Dodge																											NHA; 31										77th	70	
2006	Front Row Motorsports	34	Chevy	DAY	CAL	LVS	ATL	BRI	MAR	TEX	PHO	TAL	RCH	DAR	CLT	DOV	POC	MCH	SON	DAY	CHI	NHA; DNQ	POC	IND	GLN	MCH	BRI	CAL	RCH	NHA	DOV	KAN	TAL	CLT	MAR	ATL	TEX	PHO	HOM	N/A	0	

==== Busch Series ====
NASCAR Busch Series results
Year	Team	No.	Make	1	2	3	4	5	6	7	8	9	10	11	12	13	14	15	16	17	18	19	20	21	22	23	24	25	26	27	28	29	30	31	32	33	34	35	NBSC	Pts	Ref
1995	McCarthy-Pritchard Motorsports	77	Ford	DAY	CAR	RCH; DNQ	ATL	NSV	DAR	BRI; DNQ	HCY; DNQ	NHA	NZH	CLT	DOV	MYB	GLN	MLW	TAL	SBO	IRP	MCH	BRI; DNQ	DAR	RCH	DOV	CLT	CAR	HOM										N/A	0	
1996	McCarthy-Pritchard Motorsports	11	Chevy	DAY	CAR	RCH	ATL	NSV	DAR	BRI	HCY	NZH; 34	CLT	DOV	SBO	MYB	GLN	MLW	NHA	TAL	IRP	MCH	BRI	DAR	RCH	DOV	CLT												98th	61	
1996	McCarthy-Pritchard Motorsports	41	Chevy																									CAR; DNQ	HOM										98th	61	
1997	McCarthy-Pritchard Motorsports	41	Chevy	DAY	CAR; 42	RCH; DNQ	ATL	LVS	DAR	HCY	TEX	BRI; DNQ	NSV	TAL	NHA; 37	NZH; 28	CLT	DOV	SBO	GLN	MLW; 35	MYB	GTY	IRP	MCH	BRI	DAR	RCH; DNQ	DOV; 42	CLT	CAL	CAR	HOM						73rd	268	
1998	McCarthy-Pritchard Motorsports	41	Chevy	DAY	CAR	LVS	NSV	DAR	BRI	TEX	HCY	TAL	NHA; DNQ	NZH; 35	CLT	DOV	RCH; DNQ	PPR	GLN	MLW	MYB	CAL	SBO	IRP	MCH	BRI	DAR	RCH	DOV; 29	CLT	GTY; DNQ	CAR	ATL	HOM					89th	134	
1999	McCarthy-Pritchard Motorsports	41	Chevy	DAY	CAR	LVS	ATL	DAR	TEX	NSV	BRI	TAL	CAL	NHA	RCH	NZH; DNQ	CLT	DOV; DNQ	SBO	GLN	MLW	MYB	PPR	GTY	IRP	MCH	BRI	DAR	RCH	DOV; DNQ	CLT	CAR	MEM	PHO	HOM				N/A	0	
2006	Keith Coleman Racing	26	Chevy	DAY	CAL	MXC	LVS	ATL	BRI	TEX	NSH	PHO	TAL	RCH	DAR	CLT	DOV	NSH	KEN	MLW	DAY	CHI	NHA; 43	MAR	GTY	IRP	GLN	MCH	BRI	CAL	RCH	DOV	KAN	CLT	MEM	TEX	PHO	HOM	154th		

==== Craftsman Truck Series ====
NASCAR Craftsman Truck Series results
Year	Team	No.	Make	1	2	3	4	5	6	7	8	9	10	11	12	13	14	15	16	17	18	19	20	21	22	23	24	25	NCTC	Pts	Ref
2005	Ron Rhodes Racing	48	Dodge	DAY	CAL	ATL	MAR; DNQ	GTY	MFD	CLT	DOV	TEX	MCH	MLW	KAN	KEN	MEM	IRP	NSH	BRI	RCH	NHA	LVS	MAR	ATL	TEX	PHO	HOM	N/A	0	

==== Busch East Series ====
NASCAR Busch East Series results
Year	Team	No.	Make	1	2	3	4	5	6	7	8	9	10	11	12	13	14	15	16	17	18	19	20	NBESC	Pts	Ref
1998	McCarthy-Pritchard Motorsports	41	Chevy	LEE	RPS	NHA	NZH	HOL	GLN	STA	NHA; DNQ	DOV; 26	STA	NHA	GLN	EPP	JEN	NHA	THU	TMP	BEE	LRP		90th	85	
1999	McCarthy-Pritchard Motorsports	41	Chevy	LEE	RPS	NHA	TMP	NZH; DNQ	HOL	BEE	JEN; 16	GLN	STA	NHA; 43	NZH; 25	STA	NHA	GLN	EPP	THU	BEE	NHA; 32	LRP	53rd	304	
2000	McCarthy-Pritchard Motorsports	41	Chevy	LEE; DNQ	NHA; DNQ	SEE; DNQ	HOL; 30	BEE; DNQ	JEN; 26	GLN	STA; DNQ	NHA; 44	NZH	STA	WFD	GLN	EPP	TMP	THU	BEE	NHA; 34	LRP; 21		38th	595	
2001	McCarthy-Pritchard Motorsports	41	Chevy	LEE; 22	NHA; 13	SEE; 22	HOL; 23	BEE; 20	EPP; 21	STA; 17	WFD; 12	BEE; 18	TMP; 8	NHA; 26	STA; 22	SEE; 14	GLN; 19	NZH; 26	THU; 14	BEE; 27	DOV; 16	STA; 18	LRP; 16	15th	2141	
2002	McCarthy-Pritchard Motorsports	41	Chevy	LEE; 8	NHA; 34	NZH; 30	SEE; 23	BEE; 28																17th	1922	
2002	Jeffrey Masessa	22	Chevy						STA; 20	HOL; 14	WFD; 20	TMP	NHA; 22	STA; 17	GLN; 5	ADI; 15	THU; 10	BEE; 17	NHA; 13	DOV; 16	STA; 14	LRP; 35		17th	1922	
2003	Jeffrey Masessa	22	Chevy	LEE; 3*	STA; 9	ERI; 12	BEE; 20	STA; 4	HOL; 1	TMP; 24	NHA; 30	WFD; 9	SEE; 12	GLN; 4	ADI; 13	BEE; 11	THU; 7	NHA; 7	**STA**; 2	LRP; 4				6th	2358	
2004	STI Motorsports	8	Chevy	LEE; 2	TMP; 6	LRP; 21	SEE; 13	STA; 25	HOL; 7	ERI; 7	WFD; 5	NHA; 11	ADI; 4	GLN; 8										8th	1737	
2004	Info not available	64	Chevy												NHA; 9	DOV; 25								8th	1737	
2005	STI Motorsports	8	Chevy	STA; 12	HOL; 5	ERI; 16	NHA; 15	WFD; 10	ADI; 6	STA; 26	DUB; 24	OXF	NHA; 8	DOV; 14	LRP; 3	TMP; 6								12th	1553	
2006	STI Motorsports	3	Chevy	GRE; 25	STA; 8	HOL; 6	TMP; 13	ERI; 4	NHA; 9	ADI; 7	WFD; 11	NHA; 16	DOV; 12	LRP; 9										6th	1458	

==== Winston Modified Tour ====
NASCAR Winston Modified Tour results
Year	Car owner	No.	Make	1	2	3	4	5	6	7	8	9	10	11	12	13	14	15	16	17	18	19	20	21	NWMTC	Pts	Ref
1994	Info not available	10	Chevy	NHA	STA	TMP	NZH; 24	STA	LEE	TMP	RIV	TIO	NHA	RPS	HOL	TMP	RIV	NHA	STA	SPE	TMP; 38	NHA	STA	TMP	61st	-	
2003	Info not available	11	Pontiac	TMP	STA	WFD	NZH	STA	LER	BLL	BEE	NHA; 41	ADI	RIV	TMP	STA	WFD	TMP	NHA	STA	TMP				93rd	40	
