= Mike Garvey =

American racing driver and crew chief

- Born: Michael Garvey; September 13, 1962 (age 64); Muskegon, Michigan, U.S.
- Achievements: 1990 NASCAR Winston All-American Challenge Series Champion; 1993, 2000 All American 400 Winner
- Awards: 2012 Show Me The Money Pro Late Model Series Rookie of the Year

NASCAR Cup Series career
- 13 races run over 2 years
- 2006 position: 60th
- Best finish: 48th (2005)
- First race: 2005 Golden Corral 500 (Atlanta)
- Last race: 2006 Pocono 500 (Pocono)
Wins	Top tens	Poles
0	0	0

NASCAR O'Reilly Auto Parts Series career
- 21 races run over 7 years
- Best finish: 42nd (1994)
- First race: 1993 Havoline 250 (Milwaukee)
- Last race: 2004 Funai 250 (Richmond)
Wins	Top tens	Poles
0	0	0

NASCAR FedEx Freight Truck Series career
- 38 races run over 4 years
- 2011 position: 31st
- Best finish: 28th (2010)
- First race: 1998 Yellow Freight 200 (I-70)
- Last race: 2011 WinStar World Casino 350k (Texas)
Wins	Top tens	Poles
0	0	0
- Statistics up to date as of July 31, 2022.

Michael Garvey (born September 13, 1962) is an American professional stock car racing driver. He currently works as a crew chief in the NASCAR Xfinity Series for DGM Racing's No. 90 Chevrolet Camaro. As a driver, he competed in NASCAR and the American Speed Association.

== NASCAR career ==
Garvey has participated in races in the NASCAR Craftsman Truck Series, Busch Series, and NEXTEL Cup since 1993. He has participated in three or less races each year except for the 1994 Busch Series and the 2005 NEXTEL Cup Series driving the No. 66 Ford. His best career NEXTEL Cup finish is a 25th-place finish at the 2005 Pocono Raceway.

During the 2006 season, Garvey made four Nextel Cup starts for Competitive Edge Motorsports owned by Joe Auer. His best finish was 38th twice, at Texas Motor Speedway and California Speedway. The team suddenly shut down in August 2006 due to increased competition and sold its equipment off on eBay and folded.

In 2007, Garvey drove the No. 17 Monte Carlo in the USAR Hooters Pro Cup Southern Division series for WJP Motorsports.

Garvey served as the crew chief for NASCAR Truck Series driver Ryan Sieg in 2010. He has also competed as a teammate to Sieg on several occasions garnering a best finish of 12th at Talladega Superspeedway. Garvey also has been racing for Tracy Goodson Motorsports on his off weekends from the truck series.

Garvey returned to NASCAR in 2022 as the crew chief for DGM Racing's part-time No. 90 car driven by Mason Filippi in the Xfinity Series race at the Indianapolis Motor Speedway road course. Filippi failed to qualify for the race.

== Motorsports career results ==
=== NASCAR ===
(key) (Bold – Pole position awarded by qualifying time. Italics – Pole position earned by points standings or practice time. * – Most laps led.)

==== Sprint Cup Series ====
NASCAR Sprint Cup Series results
Year	Team	No.	Make	1	2	3	4	5	6	7	8	9	10	11	12	13	14	15	16	17	18	19	20	21	22	23	24	25	26	27	28	29	30	31	32	33	34	35	36	NSCC	Pts	Ref
2004	Haefele Racing	75	Dodge	DAY	CAR	LVS	ATL	DAR	BRI	TEX	MAR	TAL	CAL	RCH	CLT	DOV	POC	MCH	SON	DAY	CHI	NHA	POC	IND	GLN	MCH	BRI	CAL	RCH	NHA	DOV; DNQ	TAL	KAN; DNQ	CLT	MAR; DNQ	ATL	PHO; DNQ	DAR	HOM; DNQ	NA	-	
2005	Zero Four Motorsports	75	Dodge	DAY	CAL	LVS	ATL; 41	BRI	MAR; 43	TEX	PHO	TAL	DAR	RCH; 43	CLT; DNQ	DOV																			MAR; DNQ	ATL; DNQ	TEX	PHO		48th	491	
2005	Peak Fitness Racing	66	Ford														POC; 25	MCH; 36	SON	DAY; DNQ	CHI; DNQ	NHA; 36	POC; 34	IND; DNQ	GLN	MCH	BRI; DNQ	CAL; 37	RCH; 32	NHA; DNQ	DOV	TAL	KAN							48th	491	
2005	R&J Racing	37	Dodge																															CLT; DNQ						48th	491	
2005	Competitive Edge Motorsports	51	Chevy																																				HOM; DNQ	48th	491	
2006	Competitive Edge Motorsports	51	Chevy	DAY	CAL; 38	LVS	ATL; DNQ	BRI; DNQ	MAR; 41	TEX; 38	PHO; DNQ	TAL	RCH	DAR	CLT; DNQ	DOV	POC; 41	MCH; DNQ	SON	DAY	CHI; DNQ	NHA	POC	IND	GLN	MCH	BRI	CAL	RCH	NHA	DOV	KAN	TAL	CLT	MAR	ATL	TEX	PHO	HOM	60th	138	
2009	H&S Motorsports	73	Dodge	DAY; DNQ	CAL; DNQ	LVS; DNQ	ATL	BRI	MAR	TEX	PHO	TAL	RCH	DAR	CLT; DNQ	DOV	POC	MCH	SON	NHA	DAY	CHI	IND	POC	GLN	MCH	BRI	ATL	RCH	NHA	DOV	KAN	CAL	CLT	MAR	TAL	TEX	PHO	HOM	73rd	0	

===== Daytona 500 =====
Year	Team	Manufacturer	Start	Finish
2009	H&S Motorsports	Dodge	DNQ	

==== Busch Series ====
NASCAR Busch Series results
Year	Team	No.	Make	1	2	3	4	5	6	7	8	9	10	11	12	13	14	15	16	17	18	19	20	21	22	23	24	25	26	27	28	29	30	31	32	33	34	NBSC	Pts	Ref
1992		07	Chevy	DAY; DNQ	CAR	RCH	ATL	MAR	DAR	BRI	HCY	LAN	DUB	NZH	CLT	DOV	ROU	MYB	GLN	VOL	NHA	TAL	IRP	ROU	MCH	NHA	BRI	DAR	RCH	DOV	CLT	MAR	CAR	HCY				NA	-	
1993	Joe Bessey Motorsports	91	Pontiac	DAY	CAR	RCH	DAR	BRI	HCY	ROU	MAR	NZH	CLT	DOV	MYB	GLN	MLW; 37	TAL	IRP	MCH	NHA	BRI	DAR	RCH	DOV	ROU	CLT	MAR	CAR	HCY	ATL							108th	52	
1994	LaWarre Motorsports	0	Chevy	DAY; 40	CAR; 30		ATL; 25		DAR; 30			ROU; 14	NHA	NZH	CLT	DOV	MYB	GLN			TAL; 19	HCY	IRP; 26	MCH; 29	BRI	DAR; 40	RCH	DOV	CLT	MAR	CAR							42nd	963	
1994	LaWarre Motorsports	0	Pontiac			RCH; 17		MAR; 19		HCY; DNQ	BRI								MLW; 42	SBO																		42nd	963	
1995	Kevin Horton	94	Chevy	DAY	CAR	RCH	ATL	NSV	DAR	BRI	HCY	NHA	NZH	CLT	DOV	MYB	GLN	MLW	TAL	SBO	IRP	MCH	BRI	DAR	RCH	DOV	CLT	CAR	HOM; 25									93rd	88	
1996	Garvey Motorsports	42	Chevy	DAY	CAR	RCH	ATL	NSV; DNQ	DAR	BRI	HCY	NZH	CLT	DOV	SBO	MYB	GLN	MLW	NHA	TAL	IRP	MCH	BRI	DAR	RCH	DOV	CLT	CAR	HOM									NA	-	
1998	LaFavre Racing	01	Chevy	DAY	CAR	LVS	NSV	DAR	BRI	TEX	HCY	TAL	NHA	NZH	CLT	DOV	RCH	PPR	GLN	MLW	MYB	CAL	SBO	IRP	MCH	BRI	DAR	RCH	DOV	CLT	GTY	CAR	ATL	HOM; 32				113th	67	
1999	LaFavre Racing	09	Chevy	DAY; DNQ	CAR	LVS; 37	ATL	DAR	TEX	NSV	BRI	TAL	CAL	NHA	RCH	NZH	CLT	DOV	SBO	GLN	MLW; 23	MYB	PPR	GTY	IRP	MCH	BRI	DAR	RCH	DOV	CLT; DNQ	CAR; 32	MEM; DNQ	PHO	HOM; DNQ			83rd	213	
2003	Competitive Edge Motorsports	32	Chevy	DAY	CAR	LVS	DAR	BRI	TEX	TAL	NSH	CAL	RCH	GTY	NZH	CLT	DOV	NSH	KEN	MLW	DAY	CHI	NHA	PPR	IRP	MCH	BRI	DAR	RCH	DOV	KAN	CLT	MEM	ATL	PHO; 26	CAR	HOM	129th	85	
2004	Competitive Edge Motorsports	32	Chevy	DAY	CAR	LVS	DAR	BRI	TEX	NSH; 26	TAL	CAL	GTY	RCH; 37	NZH	CLT	DOV	NSH	KEN	MLW	DAY	CHI	NHA	PPR	IRP	MCH	BRI	CAL	RCH	DOV	KAN	CLT	MEM	ATL	PHO	DAR	HOM	104th	137	

==== Camping World Truck Series ====
NASCAR Camping World Truck Series results
Year	Team	No.	Make	1	2	3	4	5	6	7	8	9	10	11	12	13	14	15	16	17	18	19	20	21	22	23	24	25	26	27	NCWTC	Pts	Ref
1998	All Star Racing Team	68	Chevy	WDW	HOM; DNQ	PHO	POR	EVG	I70; 14	GLN	TEX	BRI	MLW; 23	NZH	CAL	PPR	IRP	NHA	FLM	NSV	HPT	LVL	RCH	MEM	GTY	MAR	SON	MMR	PHO	LVS	57th	252	
2009	RSS Racing	93	Chevy	DAY	CAL	ATL	MAR	KAN	CLT	DOV	TEX	MCH	MLW	MEM	KEN	IRP	NSH	BRI	CHI	IOW	GTW; 34	NHA	LVS	MAR	TAL	TEX	PHO				83rd	116	
2009	RSS Racing	38	Chevy																									HOM; 36			83rd	116	
2010	RSS Racing	93	Chevy	DAY	ATL	MAR	NSH	KAN	DOV	CLT; 36	TEX; 36	MCH; 31	IOW; 36	GTY; 34		POC; 33	NSH; 33	DAR; 32	BRI; 35	CHI; 33	KEN; 34	NHA; 31	LVS; 34	MAR; 36	TAL; 12	TEX	PHO	HOM			28th	1045	
2010	RSS Racing	39	Chevy												IRP; 35																28th	1045	
2011	RSS Racing	38	Chevy	DAY	PHO	DAR	MAR	NSH; 36	DOV; 35	CLT; 36	KAN; 35	TEX; 34	KEN; 34		NSH; 34	IRP; 36	POC; 28	MCH; 30		ATL; 35	CHI; 31	NHA	KEN; 32	LVS; 30	TAL		TEX; 36	HOM; QL^{†}			31st	160	
2011	RSS Racing	93	Chevy											IOW; 30					BRI; 35							MAR; 36					31st	160	
^{†} - Qualified but replaced by Dennis Setzer
