= 2005 Chevy American Revolution 400 =

Race details
- Race 11 of 36 in the 2005 NASCAR Nextel Cup Series
- The 2005 Chevy American Revolution 400 program cover.
- Date: May 14, 2005
- Location: Richmond International Raceway, Richmond, Virginia
- Course: Permanent racing facility
- Course length: 0.75 miles (1.207 km)
- Distance: 400 laps, 300 mi (482.803 km)
- Average speed: 100.316
- Attendance: 107,000

Pole position
Driver	Kasey Kahne	Evernham Motorsports
- Time: 20.775

Most laps led
Driver	Kasey Kahne	Evernham Motorsports
- Laps: 242

Winner
No. 9	Kasey Kahne	Evernham Motorsports

Television in the United States
- Network: FX
- Announcers: Mike Joy, Larry McReynolds, Darrell Waltrip

The 2005 Chevy American Revolution 400 was the 11th stock car race of the 2005 NASCAR Nextel Cup Series season. It was held on Saturday, May 14, 2005, before a crowd of 107,000 watching the race at Richmond, Virginia at Richmond International Raceway. The 400-lap race was won by Kasey Kahne from Evernham Motorsports. This was Kahne's first career win in the Nextel Cup Series.

The layout of Richmond International Raceway, the venue where the race was held.

== Background ==
Entry list
#	Driver	Team	Make	Sponsor
0	Mike Bliss	Haas CNC Racing	Chevrolet	NetZero, Best Buy
00	Carl Long	McGlynn Racing	Chevrolet	Buyer's Choice Auto Warranties
01	Joe Nemechek	MB2 Motorsports	Chevrolet	U. S. Army
2	Rusty Wallace	Penske-Jasper Racing	Dodge	Miller Lite
4	Mike Wallace	Morgan–McClure Motorsports	Chevrolet	Lucas Oil
5	Kyle Busch	Hendrick Motorsports	Chevrolet	Kellogg's, Star Wars: Episode III – Revenge of the Sith
6	Mark Martin	Roush Racing	Ford	Viagra
7	Robby Gordon	Robby Gordon Motorsports	Chevrolet	Jim Beam
07	Dave Blaney	Richard Childress Racing	Chevrolet	Bass Pro Shops, Tracker Boats, Jack Daniel's
8	Dale Earnhardt, Jr.	Dale Earnhardt, Inc.	Chevrolet	Budweiser
9	Kasey Kahne	Evernham Motorsports	Dodge	Dodge Dealers, UAW
09	Johnny Sauter	Phoenix Racing	Dodge	Miccosukee Gaming & Resorts
10	Scott Riggs	MBV Motorsports	Chevrolet	Valvoline Arometics
11	Jason Leffler	Joe Gibbs Racing	Chevrolet	FedEx Ground
12	Ryan Newman	Penske-Jasper Racing	Dodge	Alltel
15	Michael Waltrip	Dale Earnhardt, Inc.	Chevrolet	NAPA Auto Parts
16	Greg Biffle	Roush Racing	Ford	National Guard
17	Matt Kenseth	Roush Racing	Ford	DeWalt Power Tools
18	Bobby Labonte	Joe Gibbs Racing	Chevrolet	Boniva
19	Jeremy Mayfield	Evernham Motorsports	Dodge	Dodge Dealers, UAW
20	Tony Stewart	Joe Gibbs Racing	Chevrolet	The Home Depot
21	Ricky Rudd	Wood Brothers Racing	Ford	Motorcraft Genuine Parts
22	Scott Wimmer	Bill Davis Racing	Dodge	Caterpillar
24	Jeff Gordon	Hendrick Motorsports	Chevrolet	DuPont
25	Brian Vickers	Hendrick Motorsports	Chevrolet	GMAC, ditech.com
27	Kirk Shelmerdine	Kirk Shelmerdine Racing	Ford	D. A. R. E.
29	Kevin Harvick	Richard Childress Racing	Chevrolet	GM Goodwrench
31	Jeff Burton	Richard Childress Racing	Chevrolet	Cingular Wireless
32	Bobby Hamilton, Jr.	PPI Motorsports	Chevrolet	Tide
34	Jeff Fuller	Mach 1 Motorsports	Chevrolet	Mach One Inc.
37	Kevin Lepage	R&J Racing	Dodge	R&J Racing
38	Elliott Sadler	Robert Yates Racing	Ford	M&M's
40	Sterling Marlin	Chip Ganassi Racing with Felix Sabates	Dodge	Coors Light
41	Casey Mears	Chip Ganassi Racing with Felix Sabates	Dodge	Target
42	Jamie McMurray	Chip Ganassi Racing with Felix Sabates	Dodge	Texaco, Havoline
43	Jeff Green	Petty Enterprises	Dodge	Cheerios, Betty Crocker
45	Kyle Petty	Petty Enterprises	Dodge	Georgia-Pacific, Brawny
48	Jimmie Johnson	Hendrick Motorsports	Chevrolet	Lowe's
49	Ken Schrader	BAM Racing	Dodge	Schwan's Home Service
66	Hermie Sadler	Peak Fitness Racing	Ford	Peak Fitness
75	Mike Garvey	Rinaldi Racing	Dodge	Jani-King, Rinaldi Air Conditioning
77	Travis Kvapil	Penske-Jasper Racing	Dodge	Kodak, Jasper Engines & Transmissions
88	Dale Jarrett	Robert Yates Racing	Ford	UPS
89	Morgan Shepherd	Shepherd Racing Ventures	Dodge	Victory in Jesus, Red Line Oil
92	Tony Raines	Front Row Motorsports	Chevrolet	Front Row Motorsports
97	Kurt Busch	Roush Racing	Ford	Irwin Industrial Tools, Sharpie
99	Carl Edwards	Roush Racing	Ford	Roundup Extended Control

== Qualifying ==
Kasey Kahne would win qualifying with a 20.775. Meanwhile, during Carl Long's run, he would spin and crash his car during his lap, causing him to not qualify for the race.

Pos.	#	Driver	Team	Make	Time	Speed
1	9	Kasey Kahne	Evernham Motorsports	Dodge	20.775	129.964
2	12	Ryan Newman	Penske-Jasper Racing	Dodge	20.801	129.801
3	20	Tony Stewart	Joe Gibbs Racing	Chevrolet	20.842	129.546
4	97	Kurt Busch	Roush Racing	Ford	20.857	129.453
5	38	Elliott Sadler	Robert Yates Racing	Ford	20.920	129.063
6	21	Ricky Rudd	Wood Brothers Racing	Ford	20.932	128.989
7	29	Kevin Harvick	Richard Childress Racing	Chevrolet	20.942	128.928
8	2	Rusty Wallace	Penske-Jasper Racing	Dodge	20.948	128.891
9	16	Greg Biffle	Roush Racing	Ford	20.952	128.866
10	5	Kyle Busch	Hendrick Motorsports	Chevrolet	20.955	128.848
11	99	Carl Edwards	Roush Racing	Ford	20.964	128.792
12	31	Jeff Burton	Richard Childress Racing	Chevrolet	20.965	128.786
13	09	Johnny Sauter	Phoenix Racing	Dodge	20.969	128.762
14	6	Mark Martin	Roush Racing	Ford	20.976	128.719
15	19	Jeremy Mayfield	Evernham Motorsports	Dodge	20.995	128.602
16	41	Casey Mears	Chip Ganassi Racing with Felix Sabates	Dodge	21.019	128.455
17	42	Jamie McMurray	Chip Ganassi Racing with Felix Sabates	Dodge	21.020	128.449
18	43	Jeff Green	Petty Enterprises	Dodge	21.042	128.315
19	07	Dave Blaney	Richard Childress Racing	Chevrolet	21.049	128.272
20	24	Jeff Gordon	Hendrick Motorsports	Chevrolet	21.053	128.248
21	77	Travis Kvapil	Penske-Jasper Racing	Dodge	21.079	128.090
22	40	Sterling Marlin	Chip Ganassi Racing with Felix Sabates	Dodge	21.082	128.071
23	15	Michael Waltrip	Dale Earnhardt, Inc.	Chevrolet	21.085	128.053
24	0	Mike Bliss	Haas CNC Racing	Chevrolet	21.085	128.053
25	01	Joe Nemechek	MB2 Motorsports	Chevrolet	21.090	128.023
26	17	Matt Kenseth	Roush Racing	Ford	21.097	127.980
27	8	Dale Earnhardt, Jr.	Dale Earnhardt, Inc.	Chevrolet	21.101	127.956
28	48	Jimmie Johnson	Hendrick Motorsports	Chevrolet	21.103	127.944
29	25	Brian Vickers	Hendrick Motorsports	Chevrolet	21.146	127.684
30	4	Mike Wallace	Morgan–McClure Motorsports	Chevrolet	21.146	127.684
31	92	Tony Raines	Front Row Motorsports	Chevrolet	21.168	127.551
32	32	Bobby Hamilton, Jr.	PPI Motorsports	Chevrolet	21.195	127.388
33	7	Robby Gordon	Robby Gordon Motorsports	Chevrolet	21.218	127.250
34	22	Scott Wimmer	Bill Davis Racing	Dodge	21.224	127.215
35	88	Dale Jarrett	Robert Yates Racing	Ford	21.232	127.166
36	10	Scott Riggs	MBV Motorsports	Chevrolet	21.237	127.137
37	75	Mike Garvey	Rinaldi Racing	Dodge	21.262	126.987
38	11	Jason Leffler	Joe Gibbs Racing	Chevrolet	21.294	126.796
39	18	Bobby Labonte	Joe Gibbs Racing	Chevrolet	21.295	126.790
40	49	Ken Schrader	BAM Racing	Dodge	21.328	126.594
41	45	Kyle Petty	Petty Enterprises	Dodge	21.353	126.446
42	89	Morgan Shepherd	Shepherd Racing Ventures	Dodge	21.382	126.274
43	66	Hermie Sadler	Peak Fitness Racing	Ford	21.428	126.003
Failed to qualify
44	37	Kevin Lepage	R&J Racing	Dodge	21.432	125.980
45	34	Jeff Fuller	Mach 1 Motorsports	Chevrolet	21.492	125.628
46	27	Kirk Shelmerdine	Kirk Shelmerdine Racing	Ford	22.298	121.087
47	00	Carl Long	McGlynn Racing	Chevrolet	0.000	0.000

== Race results ==
Fin	St	#	Driver	Team	Make	Laps	Led	Status	Pts	Winnings
1	1	9	Kasey Kahne	Evernham Motorsports	Dodge	400	242	running	190	$257,325
2	3	20	Tony Stewart	Joe Gibbs Racing	Chevrolet	400	143	running	175	$204,611
3	2	12	Ryan Newman	Penske-Jasper Racing	Dodge	400	0	running	165	$162,316
4	10	5	Kyle Busch	Hendrick Motorsports	Chevrolet	400	0	running	160	$119,300
5	7	29	Kevin Harvick	Richard Childress Racing	Chevrolet	400	1	running	160	$141,261
6	9	16	Greg Biffle	Roush Racing	Ford	400	0	running	150	$103,225
7	5	38	Elliott Sadler	Robert Yates Racing	Ford	400	0	running	146	$117,341
8	39	18	Bobby Labonte	Joe Gibbs Racing	Chevrolet	400	0	running	142	$118,100
9	23	15	Michael Waltrip	Dale Earnhardt, Inc.	Chevrolet	400	0	running	138	$105,914
10	17	42	Jamie McMurray	Chip Ganassi Racing with Felix Sabates	Dodge	400	0	running	134	$87,600
11	6	21	Ricky Rudd	Wood Brothers Racing	Ford	400	0	running	130	$101,214
12	26	17	Matt Kenseth	Roush Racing	Ford	400	2	running	132	$116,746
13	15	19	Jeremy Mayfield	Evernham Motorsports	Dodge	400	0	running	124	$98,720
14	27	8	Dale Earnhardt, Jr.	Dale Earnhardt, Inc.	Chevrolet	400	0	running	121	$113,633
15	14	6	Mark Martin	Roush Racing	Ford	400	0	running	118	$84,755
16	12	31	Jeff Burton	Richard Childress Racing	Chevrolet	400	0	running	115	$95,295
17	4	97	Kurt Busch	Roush Racing	Ford	400	11	running	117	$116,695
18	25	01	Joe Nemechek	MB2 Motorsports	Chevrolet	399	0	running	109	$94,058
19	8	2	Rusty Wallace	Penske-Jasper Racing	Dodge	399	0	running	106	$98,708
20	34	22	Scott Wimmer	Bill Davis Racing	Dodge	399	0	running	103	$93,658
21	11	99	Carl Edwards	Roush Racing	Ford	399	0	running	100	$81,700
22	21	77	Travis Kvapil	Penske-Jasper Racing	Dodge	399	0	running	97	$75,075
23	22	40	Sterling Marlin	Chip Ganassi Racing with Felix Sabates	Dodge	399	0	running	94	$95,633
24	18	43	Jeff Green	Petty Enterprises	Dodge	399	0	running	91	$95,461
25	38	11	Jason Leffler	Joe Gibbs Racing	Chevrolet	399	0	running	88	$63,475
26	36	10	Scott Riggs	MBV Motorsports	Chevrolet	399	0	running	85	$88,308
27	19	07	Dave Blaney	Richard Childress Racing	Chevrolet	398	0	running	82	$73,925
28	16	41	Casey Mears	Chip Ganassi Racing with Felix Sabates	Dodge	398	0	running	79	$85,358
29	30	4	Mike Wallace	Morgan–McClure Motorsports	Chevrolet	398	0	running	76	$65,575
30	40	49	Ken Schrader	BAM Racing	Dodge	398	0	running	73	$65,400
31	33	7	Robby Gordon	Robby Gordon Motorsports	Chevrolet	398	0	running	70	$62,275
32	29	25	Brian Vickers	Hendrick Motorsports	Chevrolet	397	0	running	67	$70,150
33	41	45	Kyle Petty	Petty Enterprises	Dodge	397	1	running	69	$71,572
34	35	88	Dale Jarrett	Robert Yates Racing	Ford	396	0	running	61	$97,008
35	31	92	Tony Raines	Front Row Motorsports	Chevrolet	392	0	running	58	$61,775
36	32	32	Bobby Hamilton, Jr.	PPI Motorsports	Chevrolet	387	0	running	55	$61,625
37	24	0	Mike Bliss	Haas CNC Racing	Chevrolet	375	0	crash	52	$61,500
38	43	66	Hermie Sadler	Peak Fitness Racing	Ford	367	0	engine	49	$61,375
39	20	24	Jeff Gordon	Hendrick Motorsports	Chevrolet	252	0	crash	46	$109,986
40	28	48	Jimmie Johnson	Hendrick Motorsports	Chevrolet	80	0	crash	43	$109,566
41	13	09	Johnny Sauter	Phoenix Racing	Dodge	64	0	crash	40	$60,985
42	42	89	Morgan Shepherd	Shepherd Racing Ventures	Dodge	36	0	brakes	37	$60,860
43	37	75	Mike Garvey	Rinaldi Racing	Dodge	23	0	brakes	34	$61,069
Failed to qualify
44		37	Kevin Lepage	R&J Racing	Dodge					
45		34	Jeff Fuller	Mach 1 Motorsports	Chevrolet					
46		27	Kirk Shelmerdine	Kirk Shelmerdine Racing	Ford					
47		00	Carl Long	McGlynn Racing	Chevrolet					

Preceded by 2005 Dodge Charger 500	NASCAR Nextel Cup Season; 2005	Succeeded by 2005 Coca-Cola 600
