= 2004 MBNA America 400 =

Race details
- Race 28 of 36 in the 2004 NASCAR Sprint Cup Series
- The 2004 MBNA America 400 program cover.
- Date: September 26, 2004
- Official name: 36th Annual MBNA America 400
- Location: Dover, Delaware, Dover International Speedway
- Course: Permanent racing facility
- Course length: 1 miles (1.6 km)
- Distance: 400 laps, 400 mi (643.737 km)
- Scheduled distance: 400 laps, 400 mi (643.737 km)
- Average speed: 119.067 miles per hour (191.620 km/h)
- Attendance: 140,000

Pole position
Driver	Jeremy Mayfield	Evernham Motorsports
- Time: 22.584

Most laps led
Driver	Ryan Newman	Penske-Jasper Racing
- Laps: 325

Winner
No. 12	Ryan Newman	Penske-Jasper Racing

Television in the United States
- Network: TNT
- Announcers: Allen Bestwick, Benny Parsons, Wally Dallenbach Jr.

Radio in the United States
- Radio: Motor Racing Network

The 2004 MBNA America 400 was the 28th stock car race of the 2004 NASCAR Nextel Cup Series season, the second race of the 2004 Chase for the Nextel Cup, and the 36th iteration of the event. The race was held on Sunday, September 26, 2004, before a crowd of 140,000 in Dover, Delaware at Dover International Speedway, a 1-mile (1.6 km) permanent oval-shaped racetrack. The race took the scheduled 400 laps to complete. At race's end, Ryan Newman of Penske-Jasper Racing would dominate to win his 11th career NASCAR Nextel Cup Series win and his second and final win of the season. To fill out the Top 3, Mark Martin of Roush Racing finished 2nd, and Jeff Gordon of Hendrick Motorsports finished 3rd.

== Background ==
The layout of Dover International Speedway, the venue where the race was held.

Dover International Speedway is an oval race track in Dover, Delaware, United States that has held at least two NASCAR races since it opened in 1969. In addition to NASCAR, the track also hosted USAC and the NTT IndyCar Series. The track features one layout, a 1-mile (1.6 km) concrete oval, with 24° banking in the turns and 9° banking on the straights. The speedway is owned and operated by Dover Motorsports.

The track, nicknamed "The Monster Mile", was built in 1969 by Melvin Joseph of Melvin L. Joseph Construction Company, Inc., with an asphalt surface, but was replaced with concrete in 1995. Six years later in 2001, the track's capacity moved to 135,000 seats, making the track have the largest capacity of sports venue in the mid-Atlantic. In 2002, the name changed to Dover International Speedway from Dover Downs International Speedway after Dover Downs Gaming and Entertainment split, making Dover Motorsports. From 2007 to 2009, the speedway worked on an improvement project called "The Monster Makeover", which expanded facilities at the track and beautified the track. After the 2014 season, the track's capacity was reduced to 95,500 seats.

=== Entry list ===
#	Driver	Team	Make
0	Ward Burton	Haas CNC Racing	Chevrolet
00	Carl Long	McGlynn Racing	Chevrolet
01	Joe Nemechek	MBV Motorsports	Chevrolet
2	Rusty Wallace	Penske-Jasper Racing	Dodge
02	Hermie Sadler	SCORE Motorsports	Chevrolet
4	Jimmy Spencer	Morgan–McClure Motorsports	Chevrolet
5	Terry Labonte	Hendrick Motorsports	Chevrolet
6	Mark Martin	Roush Racing	Ford
8	Dale Earnhardt Jr.	Dale Earnhardt, Inc.	Chevrolet
9	Kasey Kahne	Evernham Motorsports	Dodge
09	Joe Ruttman	Phoenix Racing	Dodge
10	Scott Riggs	MBV Motorsports	Chevrolet
12	Ryan Newman	Penske-Jasper Racing	Dodge
13	Greg Sacks	Sacks Motorsports	Dodge
15	Michael Waltrip	Dale Earnhardt, Inc.	Chevrolet
16	Greg Biffle	Roush Racing	Ford
17	Matt Kenseth	Roush Racing	Ford
18	Bobby Labonte	Joe Gibbs Racing	Chevrolet
19	Jeremy Mayfield	Evernham Motorsports	Dodge
20	Tony Stewart	Joe Gibbs Racing	Chevrolet
21	Ricky Rudd	Wood Brothers Racing	Ford
22	Scott Wimmer	Bill Davis Racing	Dodge
24	Jeff Gordon	Hendrick Motorsports	Chevrolet
25	Brian Vickers	Hendrick Motorsports	Chevrolet
29	Kevin Harvick	Richard Childress Racing	Chevrolet
30	Jeff Burton	Richard Childress Racing	Chevrolet
31	Robby Gordon	Richard Childress Racing	Chevrolet
32	Bobby Hamilton Jr.	PPI Motorsports	Chevrolet
35	Kenny Hendrick	Gary Keller Racing	Chevrolet
37	Kevin Lepage	R&J Racing	Dodge
38	Elliott Sadler	Robert Yates Racing	Ford
40	Sterling Marlin	Chip Ganassi Racing	Dodge
41	Casey Mears	Chip Ganassi Racing	Dodge
42	Jamie McMurray	Chip Ganassi Racing	Dodge
43	Jeff Green	Petty Enterprises	Dodge
45	Kyle Petty	Petty Enterprises	Dodge
48	Jimmie Johnson	Hendrick Motorsports	Chevrolet
49	Ken Schrader	BAM Racing	Dodge
50	Jeff Fuller	Arnold Motorsports	Dodge
51	Tony Raines	Competitive Edge Motorsports	Chevrolet
72	Kirk Shelmerdine	Kirk Shelmerdine Racing	Ford
75	Mike Garvey	Haefele Racing	Dodge
77	Brendan Gaughan	Penske-Jasper Racing	Dodge
80	Derrike Cope	Hover Motorsports	Ford
88	Dale Jarrett	Robert Yates Racing	Ford
89	Morgan Shepherd	Shepherd Racing Ventures	Dodge
92	Stanton Barrett	Front Row Motorsports	Ford
97	Kurt Busch	Roush Racing	Ford
98	Geoff Bodine	Mach 1 Motorsports	Ford
99	Carl Edwards	Roush Racing	Ford
Official entry list

== Practice ==
=== First practice ===
The first practice session would occur on Friday, September 24, at 11:05 AM EST and would last for one hour and 55 minutes. Rusty Wallace of Penske-Jasper Racing would set the fastest time in the session, with a lap of 22.536 and an average speed of 159.744 miles per hour (257.083 km/h).

Pos.	#	Driver	Team	Make	Time	Speed
1	2	Rusty Wallace	Penske-Jasper Racing	Dodge	22.536	159.744
2	19	Jeremy Mayfield	Evernham Motorsports	Dodge	22.595	159.327
3	12	Ryan Newman	Penske-Jasper Racing	Dodge	22.643	158.990
Full first practice results

=== Second practice ===
The second practice session would occur on Saturday, September 25, at 9:30 AM EST and would last for 45 minutes. Matt Kenseth of Roush Racing would set the fastest time in the session, with a lap of 23.213 and an average speed of 155.085 miles per hour (249.585 km/h).

Pos.	#	Driver	Team	Make	Time	Speed
1	17	Matt Kenseth	Roush Racing	Ford	23.213	155.085
2	16	Greg Biffle	Roush Racing	Ford	23.283	154.619
3	2	Rusty Wallace	Penske-Jasper Racing	Dodge	23.305	154.473
Full second practice results

=== Third and final practice ===
The third and final practice session, sometimes referred to as Happy Hour, would occur on Saturday, September 25, at 11:10 AM EST and would last for 45 minutes. Ward Burton of Haas CNC Racing would set the fastest time in the session, with a lap of 23.213 and an average speed of 155.085 miles per hour (249.585 km/h).

Pos.	#	Driver	Team	Make	Time	Speed
1	0	Ward Burton	Haas CNC Racing	Chevrolet	23.387	153.932
2	9	Kasey Kahne	Evernham Motorsports	Dodge	23.389	153.919
3	12	Ryan Newman	Penske-Jasper Racing	Dodge	23.393	153.892
Full Happy Hour practice results

== Qualifying ==
Qualifying would occur on Friday, September 24, at 2:40 PM EST. Each driver would have two laps to set a fastest time; the fastest of the two would count as their official qualifying lap. Positions 1-38 would be decided on time, while positions 39-43 would be based on provisionals. Four spots are awarded by the use of provisionals based on owner's points. The fifth is awarded to a past champion who has not otherwise qualified for the race. If no past champ needs the provisional, the next team in the owner points will be awarded a provisional.

Jeremy Mayfield of Evernham Motorsports would win the pole, setting a time of 28.776 and an average speed of 132.360 miles per hour (213.013 km/h).

Terry Labonte would crash on his second lap, losing the backend of his car in Turn 1. However, he had made a lap that was able to get him in on time, and would still be able to qualify without a provisional.

Seven drivers would fail to qualify: Hermie Sadler, Carl Long, Stanton Barrett, Greg Sacks, Kenny Hendrick, Derrike Cope, and Mike Garvey.

=== Full qualifying results ===
Pos.	#	Driver	Team	Make	Time	Speed
1	19	Jeremy Mayfield	Evernham Motorsports	Dodge	22.584	159.405
2	12	Ryan Newman	Penske-Jasper Racing	Dodge	22.639	159.018
3	25	Brian Vickers	Hendrick Motorsports	Chevrolet	22.735	158.346
4	38	Elliott Sadler	Robert Yates Racing	Ford	22.749	158.249
5	15	Michael Waltrip	Dale Earnhardt, Inc.	Chevrolet	22.756	158.200
6	18	Bobby Labonte	Joe Gibbs Racing	Chevrolet	22.787	157.985
7	2	Rusty Wallace	Penske-Jasper Racing	Dodge	22.822	157.742
8	17	Matt Kenseth	Roush Racing	Ford	22.828	157.701
9	48	Jimmie Johnson	Hendrick Motorsports	Chevrolet	22.831	157.680
10	42	Jamie McMurray	Chip Ganassi Racing	Dodge	22.837	157.639
11	88	Dale Jarrett	Robert Yates Racing	Ford	22.841	157.611
12	6	Mark Martin	Roush Racing	Ford	22.842	157.604
13	97	Kurt Busch	Roush Racing	Ford	22.861	157.473
14	21	Ricky Rudd	Wood Brothers Racing	Ford	22.866	157.439
15	99	Carl Edwards	Roush Racing	Ford	22.907	157.157
16	8	Dale Earnhardt Jr.	Dale Earnhardt, Inc.	Chevrolet	22.917	157.089
17	0	Ward Burton	Haas CNC Racing	Chevrolet	22.935	156.965
18	10	Scott Riggs	MBV Motorsports	Chevrolet	22.957	156.815
19	16	Greg Biffle	Roush Racing	Ford	22.971	156.719
20	9	Kasey Kahne	Evernham Motorsports	Dodge	22.975	156.692
21	24	Jeff Gordon	Hendrick Motorsports	Chevrolet	22.977	156.678
22	32	Bobby Hamilton Jr.	PPI Motorsports	Chevrolet	22.994	156.563
23	20	Tony Stewart	Joe Gibbs Racing	Chevrolet	23.001	156.515
24	01	Joe Nemechek	MBV Motorsports	Chevrolet	23.010	156.454
25	77	Brendan Gaughan	Penske-Jasper Racing	Dodge	23.040	156.250
26	41	Casey Mears	Chip Ganassi Racing	Dodge	23.068	156.060
27	45	Kyle Petty	Petty Enterprises	Dodge	23.098	155.858
28	43	Jeff Green	Petty Enterprises	Dodge	23.104	155.817
29	22	Scott Wimmer	Bill Davis Racing	Dodge	23.124	155.682
30	29	Kevin Harvick	Richard Childress Racing	Chevrolet	23.134	155.615
31	49	Ken Schrader	BAM Racing	Dodge	23.149	155.514
32	31	Robby Gordon	Richard Childress Racing	Chevrolet	23.185	155.273
33	30	Jeff Burton	Richard Childress Racing	Chevrolet	23.185	155.273
34	40	Sterling Marlin	Chip Ganassi Racing	Dodge	23.189	155.246
35	37	Kevin Lepage	R&J Racing	Dodge	23.222	155.025
36	4	Jimmy Spencer	Morgan–McClure Motorsports	Chevrolet	23.284	154.613
37	51	Tony Raines	Competitive Edge Motorsports	Chevrolet	23.327	154.328
38	5	Terry Labonte	Hendrick Motorsports	Chevrolet	23.341	154.235
Provisionals
39	50	Jeff Fuller	Arnold Motorsports	Dodge	23.751	151.573
40	09	Joe Ruttman	Phoenix Racing	Dodge	23.355	154.143
41	98	Geoff Bodine	Mach 1 Motorsports	Ford	23.595	152.575
42	89	Morgan Shepherd	Shepherd Racing Ventures	Dodge	23.717	151.790
43	72	Kirk Shelmerdine	Kirk Shelmerdine Racing	Ford	24.351	147.838
Failed to qualify
44	02	Hermie Sadler	SCORE Motorsports	Chevrolet	23.379	153.984
45	00	Carl Long	McGlynn Racing	Chevrolet	23.614	152.452
46	92	Stanton Barrett	Front Row Motorsports	Ford	23.700	151.899
47	13	Greg Sacks	Sacks Motorsports	Dodge	23.788	151.337
48	35	Kenny Hendrick	Gary Keller Racing	Chevrolet	24.135	149.161
49	80	Derrike Cope	Hover Motorsports	Ford	24.813	145.085
50	75	Mike Garvey	Haefele Racing	Dodge	—	—
Official qualifying results

== Race results ==
Fin	St	#	Driver	Team	Make	Laps	Led	Status	Pts	Winnings
1	2	12	Ryan Newman	Penske-Jasper Racing	Dodge	400	325	running	190	$195,477
2	12	6	Mark Martin	Roush Racing	Ford	400	2	running	175	$138,560
3	21	24	Jeff Gordon	Hendrick Motorsports	Chevrolet	400	1	running	170	$140,533
4	11	88	Dale Jarrett	Robert Yates Racing	Ford	400	0	running	160	$122,877
5	13	97	Kurt Busch	Roush Racing	Ford	400	12	running	160	$99,745
6	23	20	Tony Stewart	Joe Gibbs Racing	Chevrolet	400	0	running	150	$117,168
7	1	19	Jeremy Mayfield	Evernham Motorsports	Dodge	400	0	running	146	$105,015
8	10	42	Jamie McMurray	Chip Ganassi Racing	Dodge	400	0	running	142	$79,715
9	16	8	Dale Earnhardt Jr.	Dale Earnhardt, Inc.	Chevrolet	399	1	running	143	$113,293
10	9	48	Jimmie Johnson	Hendrick Motorsports	Chevrolet	399	0	running	134	$86,415
11	19	16	Greg Biffle	Roush Racing	Ford	399	0	running	130	$75,630
12	14	21	Ricky Rudd	Wood Brothers Racing	Ford	399	0	running	127	$92,321
13	7	2	Rusty Wallace	Penske-Jasper Racing	Dodge	398	0	running	124	$105,348
14	6	18	Bobby Labonte	Joe Gibbs Racing	Chevrolet	398	0	running	121	$107,123
15	34	40	Sterling Marlin	Chip Ganassi Racing	Dodge	398	0	running	118	$104,415
16	5	15	Michael Waltrip	Dale Earnhardt, Inc.	Chevrolet	397	0	running	115	$96,671
17	27	45	Kyle Petty	Petty Enterprises	Dodge	397	0	running	112	$79,415
18	15	99	Carl Edwards	Roush Racing	Ford	397	0	running	109	$97,417
19	30	29	Kevin Harvick	Richard Childress Racing	Chevrolet	397	0	running	106	$99,493
20	4	38	Elliott Sadler	Robert Yates Racing	Ford	397	0	running	103	$100,648
21	28	43	Jeff Green	Petty Enterprises	Dodge	396	0	running	100	$89,565
22	25	77	Brendan Gaughan	Penske-Jasper Racing	Dodge	396	0	running	97	$72,565
23	29	22	Scott Wimmer	Bill Davis Racing	Dodge	395	0	running	94	$84,740
24	26	41	Casey Mears	Chip Ganassi Racing	Dodge	395	0	running	91	$73,065
25	31	49	Ken Schrader	BAM Racing	Dodge	394	1	running	93	$62,265
26	36	4	Jimmy Spencer	Morgan–McClure Motorsports	Chevrolet	393	0	running	85	$62,415
27	38	5	Terry Labonte	Hendrick Motorsports	Chevrolet	393	0	running	82	$88,515
28	37	51	Tony Raines	Competitive Edge Motorsports	Chevrolet	391	0	running	79	$58,590
29	22	32	Bobby Hamilton Jr.	PPI Motorsports	Chevrolet	385	0	running	76	$77,829
30	32	31	Robby Gordon	Richard Childress Racing	Chevrolet	385	0	running	73	$93,377
31	18	10	Scott Riggs	MBV Motorsports	Chevrolet	363	0	wheel bearing	70	$85,802
32	8	17	Matt Kenseth	Roush Racing	Ford	319	58	crash	72	$118,833
33	33	30	Jeff Burton	Richard Childress Racing	Chevrolet	168	0	crash	64	$66,730
34	42	89	Morgan Shepherd	Shepherd Racing Ventures	Dodge	105	0	handling	61	$57,595
35	24	01	Joe Nemechek	MBV Motorsports	Chevrolet	91	0	overheating	58	$65,380
36	35	37	Kevin Lepage	R&J Racing	Dodge	86	0	vibration	55	$57,250
37	17	0	Ward Burton	Haas CNC Racing	Chevrolet	50	0	engine	52	$57,125
38	3	25	Brian Vickers	Hendrick Motorsports	Chevrolet	46	0	crash	49	$65,100
39	41	98	Geoff Bodine	Mach 1 Motorsports	Ford	40	0	oil pressure	46	$56,875
40	43	72	Kirk Shelmerdine	Kirk Shelmerdine Racing	Ford	37	0	engine	43	$56,705
41	40	09	Joe Ruttman	Phoenix Racing	Dodge	27	0	rear end	40	$56,550
42	20	9	Kasey Kahne	Evernham Motorsports	Dodge	13	0	flywheel	37	$86,300
43	39	50	Jeff Fuller	Arnold Motorsports	Dodge	7	0	overheating	34	$56,555
Official race results

Previous race: 2004 Sylvania 300	NASCAR Nextel Cup Series; 2004 season	Next race: 2004 EA Sports 500
