= 2005 Bass Pro Shops MBNA 500 =

Race details
- Race 33 of 36 in the 2005 NASCAR Nextel Cup Series
- The 2005 Bass Pro Shops MBNA 500 program cover, featuring Jimmie Johnson, winner of the 2004 event.
- Date: October 30, 2005
- Official name: 46th Annual Bass Pro Shops MBNA 500
- Location: Hampton, Georgia, Atlanta Motor Speedway
- Course: Permanent racing facility
- Course length: 1.54 miles (2.48 km)
- Distance: 325 laps, 500.5 mi (805.476 km)
- Scheduled distance: 325 laps, 500.5 mi (805.476 km)
- Average speed: 146.834 miles per hour (236.306 km/h)
- Attendance: 120,000

Pole position
| Driver | Ryan Newman | Penske Racing |
- Time: 28.588

Most laps led
| Driver | Dale Earnhardt Jr. | Dale Earnhardt, Inc. |
- Laps: 142

Winner
| No. 99 | Carl Edwards | Roush Racing |

Television in the United States
- Network: NBC
- Announcers: Bill Weber, Benny Parsons, Wally Dallenbach Jr.

Radio in the United States
- Radio: Performance Racing Network

The 2005 Bass Pro Shops MBNA 500 was the 33nd stock car race of the 2005 NASCAR Nextel Cup Series season, the seventh race of the 2005 Chase for the Nextel Cup, and the 46th iteration of the event. The race was held on Sunday, October 30, 2005, before a crowd of 120,000 in Hampton, Georgia at Atlanta Motor Speedway, a 1.54 miles (2.48 km) permanent asphalt quad-oval intermediate speedway. The race took the scheduled 325 laps to complete. At race's end, rookie Carl Edwards of Roush Racing would steal the lead on the final restart on Lap 289 to win his third NASCAR Nextel Cup Series win of his career, his third of the season, and completing an Atlanta sweep for the 2005 season. To fill out the podium, Jeff Gordon of Hendrick Motorsports and Mark Martin of Roush Racing would finish second and third, respectively.

== Background ==
The layout of Atlanta Motor Speedway, the venue where the race was held.

Atlanta Motor Speedway (formerly Atlanta International Raceway) is a track in Hampton, Georgia, 20 miles (32 km) south of Atlanta. It is a 1.54-mile (2.48 km) quad-oval track with a seating capacity of 111,000. It opened in 1960 as a 1.5-mile (2.4 km) standard oval. In 1994, 46 condominiums were built over the northeastern side of the track. In 1997, to standardize the track with Speedway Motorsports' other two 1.5-mile (2.4 km) ovals, the entire track was almost completely rebuilt. The frontstretch and backstretch were swapped, and the configuration of the track was changed from oval to quad-oval. The project made the track one of the fastest on the NASCAR circuit.

=== Entry list ===
| # | Driver | Team | Make |
|---|---|---|---|
| 0 | Mike Bliss | Haas CNC Racing | Chevrolet |
| 00 | Carl Long | McGlynn Racing | Chevrolet |
| 1 | Martin Truex Jr. | Dale Earnhardt, Inc. | Chevrolet |
| 01 | Joe Nemechek | MB2 Motorsports | Chevrolet |
| 2 | Rusty Wallace | Penske Racing | Dodge |
| 4 | Mike Wallace | Morgan–McClure Motorsports | Chevrolet |
| 04 | Bobby Hamilton | Bobby Hamilton Racing | Dodge |
| 5 | Kyle Busch | Hendrick Motorsports | Chevrolet |
| 6 | Mark Martin | Roush Racing | Ford |
| 7 | Robby Gordon | Robby Gordon Motorsports | Chevrolet |
| 07 | Dave Blaney | Richard Childress Racing | Chevrolet |
| 8 | Dale Earnhardt Jr. | Dale Earnhardt, Inc. | Chevrolet |
| 9 | Kasey Kahne | Evernham Motorsports | Dodge |
| 09 | Johnny Sauter | Phoenix Racing | Dodge |
| 10 | Scott Riggs | MBV Motorsports | Chevrolet |
| 11 | Denny Hamlin | Joe Gibbs Racing | Chevrolet |
| 12 | Ryan Newman | Penske Racing | Dodge |
| 15 | Michael Waltrip | Dale Earnhardt, Inc. | Chevrolet |
| 16 | Greg Biffle | Roush Racing | Ford |
| 17 | Matt Kenseth | Roush Racing | Ford |
| 18 | Bobby Labonte | Joe Gibbs Racing | Chevrolet |
| 19 | Jeremy Mayfield | Evernham Motorsports | Dodge |
| 20 | Tony Stewart | Joe Gibbs Racing | Chevrolet |
| 21 | Ricky Rudd | Wood Brothers Racing | Ford |
| 22 | Scott Wimmer | Bill Davis Racing | Dodge |
| 23 | Johnny Benson Jr. | Bill Davis Racing | Dodge |
| 24 | Jeff Gordon | Hendrick Motorsports | Chevrolet |
| 25 | Brian Vickers | Hendrick Motorsports | Chevrolet |
| 29 | Kevin Harvick | Richard Childress Racing | Chevrolet |
| 31 | Jeff Burton | Richard Childress Racing | Chevrolet |
| 32 | Bobby Hamilton Jr. | PPI Motorsports | Chevrolet |
| 36 | Boris Said | MB Sutton Motorsports | Chevrolet |
| 37 | Mike Skinner | R&J Racing | Dodge |
| 38 | Elliott Sadler | Robert Yates Racing | Ford |
| 39 | Reed Sorenson | Chip Ganassi Racing with Felix Sabates | Dodge |
| 40 | Sterling Marlin | Chip Ganassi Racing with Felix Sabates | Dodge |
| 41 | Casey Mears | Chip Ganassi Racing with Felix Sabates | Dodge |
| 42 | Jamie McMurray | Chip Ganassi Racing with Felix Sabates | Dodge |
| 43 | Jeff Green | Petty Enterprises | Dodge |
| 45 | Kyle Petty | Petty Enterprises | Dodge |
| 48 | Jimmie Johnson | Hendrick Motorsports | Chevrolet |
| 49 | Ken Schrader | BAM Racing | Dodge |
| 50 | Jimmy Spencer | Arnold Motorsports | Dodge |
| 51 | Stuart Kirby | Competitive Edge Motorsports | Chevrolet |
| 66 | Kevin Lepage | Peak Fitness Racing | Ford |
| 75 | Mike Garvey | Rinaldi Racing | Dodge |
| 77 | Travis Kvapil | Penske Racing | Dodge |
| 80 | J. J. Yeley | Joe Gibbs Racing | Chevrolet |
| 88 | Dale Jarrett | Robert Yates Racing | Ford |
| 89 | Morgan Shepherd | Shepherd Racing Ventures | Dodge |
| 92 | Hermie Sadler | Front Row Motorsports | Chevrolet |
| 96 | Shane Hall* | Ortec Racing | Chevrolet |
| 97 | Kurt Busch | Roush Racing | Ford |
| 99 | Carl Edwards | Roush Racing | Ford |
Official entry list

*Withdrew.

== Practice ==
=== First practice ===
The first one-hour practice session would occur on Friday, October 28, at 12:00 PM EST. Greg Biffle of Roush Racing would set the fastest time in the session, with a 29.125 and an average speed of 190.352 miles per hour (306.342 km/h).

| Pos. | # | Driver | Team | Make | Time | Speed |
|---|---|---|---|---|---|---|
| 1 | 16 | Greg Biffle | Roush Racing | Ford | 29.125 | 190.352 |
| 2 | 97 | Kurt Busch | Roush Racing | Ford | 29.231 | 189.662 |
| 3 | 5 | Kyle Busch | Hendrick Motorsports | Chevrolet | 29.235 | 189.636 |
Full first practice results

=== Second and final practice ===
The second and final one-hour practice session, sometimes referred to as Happy Hour, would occur on Friday, October 28, at 1:30 PM EST. Dale Earnhardt of Dale Earnhardt, Inc. would set the fastest time in the session, with a 29.300 and an average speed of 189.215 miles per hour (304.512 km/h).

| Pos. | # | Driver | Team | Make | Time | Speed |
|---|---|---|---|---|---|---|
| 1 | 8 | Dale Earnhardt Jr. | Dale Earnhardt, Inc. | Chevrolet | 29.300 | 189.215 |
| 2 | 43 | Jeff Green | Petty Enterprises | Dodge | 29.386 | 188.661 |
| 3 | 25 | Brian Vickers | Hendrick Motorsports | Chevrolet | 29.389 | 188.642 |
Full Happy Hour practice results

== Qualifying ==
Qualifying was held on Friday, October 28, at 7:10 PM EST. Each driver would have two laps to set a fastest time; the fastest of the two would count as their official qualifying lap.

Ryan Newman of Penske Racing would win the pole, with a lap of 28.588 and an average speed of 193.928 miles per hour (312.097 km/h).

=== Full qualifying results ===
| Pos. | # | Driver | Team | Make | Time | Speed |
|---|---|---|---|---|---|---|
| 1 | 12 | Ryan Newman | Penske Racing | Dodge | 28.588 | 193.928 |
| 2 | 99 | Carl Edwards | Roush Racing | Ford | 28.663 | 193.420 |
| 3 | 38 | Elliott Sadler | Robert Yates Racing | Ford | 28.670 | 193.373 |
| 4 | 6 | Mark Martin | Roush Racing | Ford | 28.797 | 192.520 |
| 5 | 07 | Dave Blaney | Richard Childress Racing | Chevrolet | 28.849 | 192.173 |
| 6 | 9 | Kasey Kahne | Evernham Motorsports | Dodge | 28.878 | 191.980 |
| 7 | 5 | Kyle Busch | Hendrick Motorsports | Chevrolet | 28.903 | 191.814 |
| 8 | 1 | Martin Truex Jr. | Dale Earnhardt, Inc. | Chevrolet | 28.914 | 191.741 |
| 9 | 88 | Dale Jarrett | Robert Yates Racing | Ford | 28.917 | 191.721 |
| 10 | 20 | Tony Stewart | Joe Gibbs Racing | Chevrolet | 28.922 | 191.688 |
| 11 | 25 | Brian Vickers | Hendrick Motorsports | Chevrolet | 28.934 | 191.609 |
| 12 | 48 | Jimmie Johnson | Hendrick Motorsports | Chevrolet | 28.940 | 191.569 |
| 13 | 66 | Kevin Lepage | Peak Fitness Racing | Ford | 28.953 | 191.483 |
| 14 | 43 | Jeff Green | Petty Enterprises | Dodge | 28.976 | 191.331 |
| 15 | 37 | Mike Skinner | R&J Racing | Dodge | 29.010 | 191.107 |
| 16 | 16 | Greg Biffle | Roush Racing | Ford | 29.014 | 191.080 |
| 17 | 8 | Dale Earnhardt Jr. | Dale Earnhardt, Inc. | Chevrolet | 29.014 | 191.080 |
| 18 | 19 | Jeremy Mayfield | Evernham Motorsports | Dodge | 29.079 | 190.653 |
| 19 | 23 | Johnny Benson Jr. | Bill Davis Racing | Dodge | 29.079 | 190.653 |
| 20 | 00 | Carl Long | McGlynn Racing | Dodge | 29.081 | 190.640 |
| 21 | 0 | Mike Bliss | Haas CNC Racing | Chevrolet | 29.092 | 190.568 |
| 22 | 39 | Reed Sorenson | Chip Ganassi Racing with Felix Sabates | Dodge | 29.106 | 190.476 |
| 23 | 17 | Matt Kenseth | Roush Racing | Ford | 29.107 | 190.470 |
| 24 | 24 | Jeff Gordon | Hendrick Motorsports | Chevrolet | 29.108 | 190.463 |
| 25 | 11 | Denny Hamlin | Joe Gibbs Racing | Chevrolet | 29.151 | 190.182 |
| 26 | 04 | Bobby Hamilton | Bobby Hamilton Racing | Dodge | 29.155 | 190.156 |
| 27 | 01 | Joe Nemechek | MB2 Motorsports | Chevrolet | 29.175 | 190.026 |
| 28 | 42 | Jamie McMurray | Chip Ganassi Racing with Felix Sabates | Dodge | 29.190 | 189.928 |
| 29 | 21 | Ricky Rudd | Wood Brothers Racing | Ford | 29.198 | 189.876 |
| 30 | 97 | Kurt Busch | Roush Racing | Ford | 29.210 | 189.798 |
| 31 | 29 | Kevin Harvick | Richard Childress Racing | Chevrolet | 29.235 | 189.636 |
| 32 | 2 | Rusty Wallace | Penske Racing | Dodge | 29.272 | 189.396 |
| 33 | 40 | Sterling Marlin | Chip Ganassi Racing with Felix Sabates | Dodge | 29.287 | 189.299 |
| 34 | 10 | Scott Riggs | MBV Motorsports | Chevrolet | 29.337 | 188.976 |
| 35 | 18 | Bobby Labonte | Joe Gibbs Racing | Chevrolet | 29.361 | 188.822 |
| 36 | 22 | Scott Wimmer | Bill Davis Racing | Dodge | 29.376 | 188.725 |
| 37 | 15 | Michael Waltrip | Dale Earnhardt, Inc. | Chevrolet | 29.379 | 188.706 |
| 38 | 41 | Casey Mears | Chip Ganassi Racing with Felix Sabates | Dodge | 29.409 | 188.514 |
Qualified on owner's points
| 39 | 45 | Kyle Petty | Petty Enterprises | Dodge | 29.431 | 188.373 |
| 40 | 77 | Travis Kvapil | Penske Racing | Dodge | 29.495 | 187.964 |
| 41 | 31 | Jeff Burton | Richard Childress Racing | Chevrolet | 29.517 | 187.824 |
| 42 | 49 | Ken Schrader | BAM Racing | Dodge | 29.606 | 187.259 |
Last car to qualify on time
| 43 | 92 | Chad Chaffin | Front Row Motorsports | Chevrolet | 29.226 | 189.694 |
Failed to qualify or withdrew
| 44 | 80 | J. J. Yeley | Joe Gibbs Racing | Chevrolet | 29.245 | 189.571 |
| 45 | 36 | Boris Said | MB Sutton Motorsports | Chevrolet | 29.252 | 189.525 |
| 46 | 32 | Bobby Hamilton Jr. | PPI Motorsports | Chevrolet | 29.396 | 188.597 |
| 47 | 09 | Johnny Sauter | Phoenix Racing | Dodge | 29.413 | 188.488 |
| 48 | 7 | Robby Gordon | Robby Gordon Motorsports | Chevrolet | 29.417 | 188.462 |
| 49 | 51 | Stuart Kirby | Competitive Edge Motorsports | Chevrolet | 29.425 | 188.411 |
| 50 | 4 | Mike Wallace | Morgan–McClure Motorsports | Chevrolet | 29.569 | 187.494 |
| 51 | 50 | Jimmy Spencer | Arnold Motorsports | Dodge | 29.571 | 187.481 |
| 52 | 75 | Mike Garvey | Rinaldi Racing | Dodge | 29.687 | 186.748 |
| 53 | 89 | Morgan Shepherd | Shepherd Racing Ventures | Dodge | 30.437 | 182.147 |
| WD | 96 | Shane Hall | Ortec Racing | Chevrolet | — | — |
Official qualifying results

== Race results ==
| Fin | St | # | Driver | Team | Make | Laps | Led | Status | Pts | Winnings |
|---|---|---|---|---|---|---|---|---|---|---|
| 1 | 2 | 99 | Carl Edwards | Roush Racing | Ford | 325 | 115 | running | 185 | $314,700 |
| 2 | 24 | 24 | Jeff Gordon | Hendrick Motorsports | Chevrolet | 325 | 0 | running | 170 | $236,836 |
| 3 | 4 | 6 | Mark Martin | Roush Racing | Ford | 325 | 43 | running | 170 | $174,200 |
| 4 | 17 | 8 | Dale Earnhardt Jr. | Dale Earnhardt, Inc. | Chevrolet | 325 | 142 | running | 170 | $207,808 |
| 5 | 23 | 17 | Matt Kenseth | Roush Racing | Ford | 325 | 1 | running | 160 | $161,486 |
| 6 | 28 | 42 | Jamie McMurray | Chip Ganassi Racing with Felix Sabates | Dodge | 325 | 0 | running | 150 | $119,500 |
| 7 | 16 | 16 | Greg Biffle | Roush Racing | Ford | 325 | 5 | running | 151 | $118,150 |
| 8 | 41 | 31 | Jeff Burton | Richard Childress Racing | Chevrolet | 325 | 0 | running | 142 | $133,645 |
| 9 | 10 | 20 | Tony Stewart | Joe Gibbs Racing | Chevrolet | 325 | 1 | running | 143 | $143,311 |
| 10 | 3 | 38 | Elliott Sadler | Robert Yates Racing | Ford | 325 | 10 | running | 139 | $157,641 |
| 11 | 37 | 15 | Michael Waltrip | Dale Earnhardt, Inc. | Chevrolet | 325 | 0 | running | 130 | $123,889 |
| 12 | 7 | 5 | Kyle Busch | Hendrick Motorsports | Chevrolet | 325 | 4 | running | 132 | $104,475 |
| 13 | 21 | 0 | Mike Bliss | Haas CNC Racing | Chevrolet | 325 | 1 | running | 129 | $94,725 |
| 14 | 9 | 88 | Dale Jarrett | Robert Yates Racing | Ford | 325 | 0 | running | 121 | $126,858 |
| 15 | 11 | 25 | Brian Vickers | Hendrick Motorsports | Chevrolet | 325 | 0 | running | 118 | $101,300 |
| 16 | 12 | 48 | Jimmie Johnson | Hendrick Motorsports | Chevrolet | 325 | 0 | running | 115 | $135,341 |
| 17 | 29 | 21 | Ricky Rudd | Wood Brothers Racing | Ford | 324 | 0 | running | 112 | $117,314 |
| 18 | 27 | 01 | Joe Nemechek | MB2 Motorsports | Chevrolet | 324 | 0 | running | 109 | $115,258 |
| 19 | 25 | 11 | Denny Hamlin | Joe Gibbs Racing | Chevrolet | 324 | 0 | running | 106 | $88,275 |
| 20 | 33 | 40 | Sterling Marlin | Chip Ganassi Racing with Felix Sabates | Dodge | 323 | 0 | running | 103 | $117,338 |
| 21 | 38 | 41 | Casey Mears | Chip Ganassi Racing with Felix Sabates | Dodge | 323 | 0 | running | 100 | $110,733 |
| 22 | 31 | 29 | Kevin Harvick | Richard Childress Racing | Chevrolet | 323 | 0 | running | 97 | $129,186 |
| 23 | 1 | 12 | Ryan Newman | Penske Racing | Dodge | 323 | 1 | running | 99 | $137,266 |
| 24 | 5 | 07 | Dave Blaney | Richard Childress Racing | Chevrolet | 323 | 0 | running | 91 | $93,225 |
| 25 | 39 | 45 | Kyle Petty | Petty Enterprises | Dodge | 323 | 1 | running | 93 | $98,133 |
| 26 | 40 | 77 | Travis Kvapil | Penske Racing | Dodge | 322 | 0 | running | 85 | $90,775 |
| 27 | 36 | 22 | Scott Wimmer | Bill Davis Racing | Dodge | 321 | 0 | running | 82 | $101,733 |
| 28 | 19 | 23 | Johnny Benson Jr. | Bill Davis Racing | Dodge | 321 | 0 | running | 79 | $78,375 |
| 29 | 14 | 43 | Jeff Green | Petty Enterprises | Dodge | 319 | 1 | running | 81 | $110,261 |
| 30 | 26 | 04 | Bobby Hamilton | Bobby Hamilton Racing | Dodge | 319 | 0 | running | 73 | $78,575 |
| 31 | 35 | 18 | Bobby Labonte | Joe Gibbs Racing | Chevrolet | 316 | 0 | running | 70 | $115,500 |
| 32 | 20 | 00 | Carl Long | McGlynn Racing | Dodge | 311 | 0 | running | 67 | $77,750 |
| 33 | 34 | 10 | Scott Riggs | MBV Motorsports | Chevrolet | 291 | 0 | engine | 64 | $98,572 |
| 34 | 42 | 49 | Ken Schrader | BAM Racing | Dodge | 277 | 0 | engine | 61 | $77,425 |
| 35 | 6 | 9 | Kasey Kahne | Evernham Motorsports | Dodge | 276 | 0 | crash | 58 | $109,350 |
| 36 | 30 | 97 | Kurt Busch | Roush Racing | Ford | 270 | 0 | running | 55 | $129,550 |
| 37 | 32 | 2 | Rusty Wallace | Penske Racing | Dodge | 258 | 0 | running | 52 | $108,008 |
| 38 | 18 | 19 | Jeremy Mayfield | Evernham Motorsports | Dodge | 226 | 0 | running | 49 | $103,200 |
| 39 | 43 | 32 | Bobby Hamilton Jr. | Front Row Motorsports | Chevrolet | 219 | 0 | engine | 46 | $76,725 |
| 40 | 8 | 1 | Martin Truex Jr. | Dale Earnhardt, Inc. | Chevrolet | 176 | 0 | crash | 43 | $76,600 |
| 41 | 22 | 39 | Reed Sorenson | Chip Ganassi Racing with Felix Sabates | Dodge | 133 | 0 | crash | 40 | $76,475 |
| 42 | 13 | 66 | Kevin Lepage | Peak Fitness Racing | Ford | 113 | 0 | engine | 37 | $76,365 |
| 43 | 15 | 37 | Mike Skinner | R&J Racing | Dodge | 5 | 0 | crash | 34 | $76,588 |

| Previous race: 2005 Subway 500 | NASCAR Nextel Cup Series; 2005 season | Next race: 2005 Dickies 500 |
