= 2005 UAW-GM Quality 500 =

Race details
- Race 31 of 36 in the 2005 NASCAR Nextel Cup Series
- The 2005 UAW-GM Quality 500 program cover, with artwork by Sam Bass. The painting is called "Head Games!"
- Date: October 15, 2005
- Official name: 46th Annual UAW-GM Quality 500
- Location: Concord, North Carolina, Lowe's Motor Speedway
- Course: Permanent racing facility
- Course length: 1.5 miles (2.41 km)
- Distance: 336 laps, 504 mi (811.109 km)
- Scheduled distance: 334 laps, 501 mi (806.281 km)
- Average speed: 120.334 miles per hour (193.659 km/h)
- Attendance: 165,000

Pole position
Driver	Elliott Sadler	Robert Yates Racing
- Time: 27.948

Most laps led
Driver	Elliott Sadler	Robert Yates Racing
- Laps: 112

Winner
No. 48	Jimmie Johnson	Hendrick Motorsports

Television in the United States
- Network: NBC
- Announcers: Bill Weber, Benny Parsons, Wally Dallenbach Jr.

Radio in the United States
- Radio: Performance Racing Network

The 2005 UAW-GM Quality 500 was the stock car racing race of the 2005 NASCAR Nextel Cup Series season, the fifth race of the 2005 Chase for the Nextel Cup, and the 46th iteration of the event. The race was held on Saturday, October 15, 2005, before a crowd of 165,000 in Concord, North Carolina, at Lowe's Motor Speedway, a 1.5 miles (2.4 km) permanent quad-oval. The race was extended from its scheduled 334 laps to 336 laps due to a green–white–checker finish. At race's end, Jimmie Johnson of Hendrick Motorsports would hold off the field on the final restart to win his 18th career NASCAR Nextel Cup Series win and his fourth and final win of the season. To fill out the podium, Kurt Busch and Greg Biffle of Roush Racing would finish second and third, respectively.

== Background ==
The layout of Lowe's Motor Speedway, the venue where the race was held.

Lowe's Motor Speedway is a motorsports complex located in Concord, North Carolina, United States 13 miles from Charlotte, North Carolina. The complex features a 1.5 miles (2.4 km) quad oval track that hosts NASCAR racing including the prestigious Coca-Cola 600 on Memorial Day weekend and the NEXTEL All-Star Challenge, as well as the UAW-GM Quality 500. The speedway was built in 1959 by Bruton Smith and is considered the home track for NASCAR with many race teams located in the Charlotte area. The track is owned and operated by Speedway Motorsports Inc. (SMI) with Marcus Smith as track president.

=== Entry list ===
#	Driver	Team	Make
0	Mike Bliss	Haas CNC Racing	Chevrolet
00	David Reutimann	Michael Waltrip Racing	Chevrolet
01	Joe Nemechek	MB2 Motorsports	Chevrolet
2	Rusty Wallace	Penske Racing	Dodge
4	Mike Wallace	Morgan–McClure Motorsports	Chevrolet
5	Kyle Busch	Hendrick Motorsports	Chevrolet
6	Mark Martin	Roush Racing	Ford
7	Robby Gordon	Robby Gordon Motorsports	Chevrolet
07	Dave Blaney	Richard Childress Racing	Chevrolet
8	Dale Earnhardt Jr.	Dale Earnhardt, Inc.	Chevrolet
9	Kasey Kahne	Evernham Motorsports	Dodge
09	Johnny Sauter	Phoenix Racing	Dodge
10	Scott Riggs	MBV Motorsports	Chevrolet
11	Denny Hamlin	Joe Gibbs Racing	Chevrolet
12	Ryan Newman	Penske Racing	Dodge
15	Michael Waltrip	Dale Earnhardt, Inc.	Chevrolet
16	Greg Biffle	Roush Racing	Ford
17	Matt Kenseth	Roush Racing	Ford
18	Bobby Labonte	Joe Gibbs Racing	Chevrolet
19	Jeremy Mayfield	Evernham Motorsports	Dodge
20	Tony Stewart	Joe Gibbs Racing	Chevrolet
21	Ricky Rudd	Wood Brothers Racing	Ford
22	Scott Wimmer	Bill Davis Racing	Dodge
24	Jeff Gordon	Hendrick Motorsports	Chevrolet
25	Brian Vickers	Hendrick Motorsports	Chevrolet
29	Kevin Harvick	Richard Childress Racing	Chevrolet
31	Jeff Burton	Richard Childress Racing	Chevrolet
32	Bobby Hamilton Jr.	PPI Motorsports	Chevrolet
34	Hermie Sadler*	Mach 1 Motorsports	Chevrolet
36	Boris Said	MB Sutton Motorsports	Chevrolet
37	Tony Raines	R&J Racing	Dodge
38	Elliott Sadler	Robert Yates Racing	Ford
39	David Stremme	Chip Ganassi Racing with Felix Sabates	Dodge
40	Sterling Marlin	Chip Ganassi Racing with Felix Sabates	Dodge
41	Casey Mears	Chip Ganassi Racing with Felix Sabates	Dodge
42	Jamie McMurray	Chip Ganassi Racing with Felix Sabates	Dodge
43	Jeff Green	Petty Enterprises	Dodge
45	Kyle Petty	Petty Enterprises	Dodge
48	Jimmie Johnson	Hendrick Motorsports	Chevrolet
49	Ken Schrader	BAM Racing	Dodge
50	Jimmy Spencer	Arnold Motorsports	Dodge
51	Stuart Kirby	Competitive Edge Motorsports	Chevrolet
66	Kevin Lepage	Peak Fitness Racing	Ford
77	Travis Kvapil	Penske Racing	Dodge
80	Carl Long	McGlynn Racing	Chevrolet
88	Dale Jarrett	Robert Yates Racing	Ford
92	P. J. Jones	Front Row Motorsports	Chevrolet
95	Stanton Barrett	Stanton Barrett Motorsports	Chevrolet
97	Kurt Busch	Roush Racing	Ford
99	Carl Edwards	Roush Racing	Ford

*Withdrew.

== Practice ==
=== First practice ===
The first practice session was held on Thursday, October 13, at 1:00 PM EST and would last for 50 minutes. Elliott Sadler of Robert Yates Racing would set the fastest time in the session, with a 28.305 and an average speed of 190.779 miles per hour (307.029 km/h).

Pos.	#	Driver	Team	Make	Time	Speed
1	38	Elliott Sadler	Robert Yates Racing	Ford	28.305	190.779
2	20	Tony Stewart	Joe Gibbs Racing	Chevrolet	28.354	190.449
3	48	Jimmie Johnson	Hendrick Motorsports	Chevrolet	28.424	189.980
Full first practice results

=== Second practice ===
The second practice session was held on Thursday, October 13, at 3:10 PM EST and would last for an hour and 10 minutes. Jimmie Johnson of Hendrick Motorsports would set the fastest time in the session, with a 27.948 and an average speed of 193.216 miles per hour (310.951 km/h).

Pos.	#	Driver	Team	Make	Time	Speed
1	48	Jimmie Johnson	Hendrick Motorsports	Chevrolet	27.948	193.216
2	12	Ryan Newman	Penske Racing	Dodge	28.026	192.678
3	6	Mark Martin	Roush Racing	Ford	28.150	191.829
Full second practice results

=== Third practice ===
The third practice session was held on Friday, October 14, at 4:30 PM EST and would last for 45 minutes. Jimmie Johnson of Hendrick Motorsports would set the fastest time in the session, with a 28.692 and an average speed of 188.206 miles per hour (302.888 km/h).

Pos.	#	Driver	Team	Make	Time	Speed
1	48	Jimmie Johnson	Hendrick Motorsports	Chevrolet	28.692	188.206
2	12	Ryan Newman	Penske Racing	Dodge	28.698	188.166
3	99	Carl Edwards	Roush Racing	Ford	28.727	187.976
Full third practice results

=== Fourth and final practice ===
The fourth and final practice session, sometimes referred to as Happy Hour, was held on Friday, October 14, at 6:10 PM EST and would last for 45 minutes. Ryan Newman of Penske Racing would set the fastest time in the session, with a 28.502 and an average speed of 189.460 miles per hour (304.906 km/h).

Pos.	#	Driver	Team	Make	Time	Speed
1	12	Ryan Newman	Penske Racing	Dodge	28.502	189.460
2	20	Tony Stewart	Joe Gibbs Racing	Chevrolet	28.591	188.871
3	48	Jimmie Johnson	Hendrick Motorsports	Chevrolet	28.653	188.462
Full Happy Hour practice results

== Qualifying ==
Qualifying was held on Thursday, October 13, at 7:10 PM EST. Each driver would have two laps to set a fastest time; the fastest of the two would count as their official qualifying lap.

Elliott Sadler of Robert Yates Racing would win the pole, with a time of 27.948 and an average speed of 193.216 miles per hour (310.951 km/h).

Six drivers would fail to qualify: Boris Said, Carl Long, Jimmy Spencer, Mike Garvey, P. J. Jones, and Stanton Barrett.

=== Full qualifying results ===
Pos.	#	Driver	Team	Make	Time	Speed
1	38	Elliott Sadler	Robert Yates Racing	Ford	27.948	193.216
2	12	Ryan Newman	Penske Racing	Dodge	27.961	193.126
3	48	Jimmie Johnson	Hendrick Motorsports	Chevrolet	28.001	192.850
4	20	Tony Stewart	Joe Gibbs Racing	Chevrolet	28.022	192.706
5	18	Bobby Labonte	Joe Gibbs Racing	Chevrolet	28.027	192.671
6	6	Mark Martin	Roush Racing	Ford	28.123	192.014
7	97	Kurt Busch	Roush Racing	Ford	28.131	191.959
8	99	Carl Edwards	Roush Racing	Ford	28.145	191.864
9	41	Casey Mears	Chip Ganassi Racing with Felix Sabates	Dodge	28.151	191.823
10	24	Jeff Gordon	Hendrick Motorsports	Chevrolet	28.167	191.714
11	0	Mike Bliss	Haas CNC Racing	Chevrolet	28.192	191.544
12	01	Joe Nemechek	MB2 Motorsports	Chevrolet	28.214	191.394
13	5	Kyle Busch	Hendrick Motorsports	Chevrolet	28.216	191.381
14	22	Scott Wimmer	Bill Davis Racing	Dodge	28.271	191.008
15	10	Scott Riggs	MBV Motorsports	Chevrolet	28.280	190.948
16	45	Kyle Petty	Petty Enterprises	Dodge	28.305	190.779
17	66	Kevin Lepage	Peak Fitness Racing	Ford	28.306	190.772
18	17	Matt Kenseth	Roush Racing	Ford	28.315	190.712
19	31	Jeff Burton	Richard Childress Racing	Chevrolet	28.320	190.678
20	88	Dale Jarrett	Robert Yates Racing	Ford	28.332	190.597
21	16	Greg Biffle	Roush Racing	Ford	28.348	190.490
22	07	Dave Blaney	Richard Childress Racing	Chevrolet	28.360	190.409
23	7	Robby Gordon	Robby Gordon Motorsports	Chevrolet	28.371	190.335
24	32	Bobby Hamilton Jr.	PPI Motorsports	Chevrolet	28.410	190.074
25	25	Brian Vickers	Hendrick Motorsports	Chevrolet	28.431	189.934
26	00	David Reutimann	Michael Waltrip Racing	Chevrolet	28.440	189.873
27	2	Rusty Wallace	Penske Racing	Dodge	28.447	189.827
28	8	Dale Earnhardt Jr.	Dale Earnhardt, Inc.	Chevrolet	28.463	189.720
29	42	Jamie McMurray	Chip Ganassi Racing with Felix Sabates	Dodge	28.476	189.633
30	40	Sterling Marlin	Chip Ganassi Racing with Felix Sabates	Dodge	28.486	189.567
31	21	Ricky Rudd	Wood Brothers Racing	Ford	28.489	189.547
32	15	Michael Waltrip	Dale Earnhardt, Inc.	Chevrolet	28.492	189.527
33	9	Kasey Kahne	Evernham Motorsports	Dodge	28.513	189.387
34	39	David Stremme	Chip Ganassi Racing with Felix Sabates	Dodge	28.515	189.374
35	29	Kevin Harvick	Richard Childress Racing	Chevrolet	28.525	189.308
36	4	Mike Wallace	Morgan–McClure Motorsports	Chevrolet	28.571	189.003
37	19	Jeremy Mayfield	Evernham Motorsports	Dodge	28.583	188.923
38	51	Stuart Kirby	Competitive Edge Motorsports	Chevrolet	28.652	188.469
39	11	Denny Hamlin	Joe Gibbs Racing	Chevrolet	28.723	188.003
Qualified on owner's points
40	49	Ken Schrader	BAM Racing	Dodge	28.808	187.448
41	43	Jeff Green	Petty Enterprises	Dodge	28.864	187.084
42	77	Travis Kvapil	Penske Racing	Dodge	29.006	186.168
Last car to qualify on time
43	09	Johnny Sauter	Phoenix Racing	Dodge	28.691	188.212
Failed to qualify or withdrew
44	36	Boris Said	MB Sutton Motorsports	Chevrolet	28.701	188.147
45	80	Carl Long	McGlynn Racing	Chevrolet	28.782	187.617
46	50	Jimmy Spencer	Arnold Motorsports	Dodge	28.875	187.013
47	37	Mike Garvey	R&J Racing	Dodge	28.978	186.348
48	92	P. J. Jones	Front Row Motorsports	Chevrolet	—	—
49	95	Stanton Barrett	Stanton Barrett Motorsports	Chevrolet	—	—
WD	34	Hermie Sadler	Mach 1 Motorsports	Chevrolet	—	—
Official qualifying results

== Race results ==
Fin	St	#	Driver	Team	Make	Laps	Led	Status	Pts	Winnings
1	3	48	Jimmie Johnson	Hendrick Motorsports	Chevrolet	336	13	running	185	$264,991
2	7	97	Kurt Busch	Roush Racing	Ford	336	2	running	175	$222,625
3	21	16	Greg Biffle	Roush Racing	Ford	336	4	running	170	$156,050
4	12	01	Joe Nemechek	MB2 Motorsports	Chevrolet	336	11	running	165	$154,308
5	6	6	Mark Martin	Roush Racing	Ford	336	0	running	155	$128,900
6	9	41	Casey Mears	Chip Ganassi Racing with Felix Sabates	Dodge	336	9	running	155	$138,908
7	2	12	Ryan Newman	Penske Racing	Dodge	336	42	running	151	$145,641
8	39	11	Denny Hamlin	Joe Gibbs Racing	Chevrolet	336	1	running	147	$92,325
9	31	21	Ricky Rudd	Wood Brothers Racing	Ford	336	4	running	143	$112,214
10	8	99	Carl Edwards	Roush Racing	Ford	336	0	running	134	$100,275
11	37	19	Jeremy Mayfield	Evernham Motorsports	Dodge	336	1	running	135	$108,870
12	25	25	Brian Vickers	Hendrick Motorsports	Chevrolet	336	0	running	127	$86,850
13	22	07	Dave Blaney	Richard Childress Racing	Chevrolet	336	0	running	124	$86,150
14	19	31	Jeff Burton	Richard Childress Racing	Chevrolet	336	0	running	121	$101,520
15	16	45	Kyle Petty	Petty Enterprises	Dodge	336	0	running	118	$90,233
16	43	09	Johnny Sauter	Phoenix Racing	Dodge	336	0	running	115	$68,875
17	42	77	Travis Kvapil	Penske Racing	Dodge	336	1	running	117	$81,525
18	5	18	Bobby Labonte	Joe Gibbs Racing	Chevrolet	336	0	running	109	$107,550
19	41	43	Jeff Green	Petty Enterprises	Dodge	336	1	running	111	$99,911
20	14	22	Scott Wimmer	Bill Davis Racing	Dodge	336	1	running	108	$90,783
21	17	66	Kevin Lepage	Peak Fitness Racing	Ford	336	0	running	100	$71,675
22	26	00	David Reutimann	Michael Waltrip Racing	Chevrolet	336	0	running	97	$66,600
23	33	9	Kasey Kahne	Evernham Motorsports	Dodge	336	35	running	99	$105,025
24	27	2	Rusty Wallace	Penske Racing	Dodge	336	0	running	91	$100,188
25	4	20	Tony Stewart	Joe Gibbs Racing	Chevrolet	328	61	running	93	$139,561
26	18	17	Matt Kenseth	Roush Racing	Ford	326	0	running	85	$113,561
27	1	38	Elliott Sadler	Robert Yates Racing	Ford	326	112	running	92	$157,001
28	35	29	Kevin Harvick	Richard Childress Racing	Chevrolet	291	0	running	79	$112,136
29	32	15	Michael Waltrip	Dale Earnhardt, Inc.	Chevrolet	278	31	crash	81	$95,214
30	20	88	Dale Jarrett	Robert Yates Racing	Ford	278	0	crash	73	$102,433
31	29	42	Jamie McMurray	Chip Ganassi Racing with Felix Sabates	Dodge	278	0	crash	70	$75,075
32	23	7	Robby Gordon	Robby Gordon Motorsports	Chevrolet	278	0	engine	67	$64,375
33	15	10	Scott Riggs	MBV Motorsports	Chevrolet	267	0	crash	64	$82,747
34	40	49	Ken Schrader	BAM Racing	Dodge	255	0	engine	61	$64,125
35	11	0	Mike Bliss	Haas CNC Racing	Chevrolet	252	0	crash	58	$63,975
36	34	39	David Stremme	Chip Ganassi Racing with Felix Sabates	Dodge	244	0	crash	55	$63,790
37	38	51	Stuart Kirby	Competitive Edge Motorsports	Chevrolet	213	0	handling	52	$63,670
38	10	24	Jeff Gordon	Hendrick Motorsports	Chevrolet	151	0	crash	49	$112,596
39	13	5	Kyle Busch	Hendrick Motorsports	Chevrolet	150	7	crash	51	$71,450
40	30	40	Sterling Marlin	Chip Ganassi Racing with Felix Sabates	Dodge	124	0	crash	43	$91,248
41	24	32	Bobby Hamilton Jr.	PPI Motorsports	Chevrolet	94	0	crash	40	$63,215
42	28	8	Dale Earnhardt Jr.	Dale Earnhardt, Inc.	Chevrolet	61	0	crash	37	$110,508
43	36	4	Mike Wallace	Morgan–McClure Motorsports	Chevrolet	40	0	timing chain	34	$63,318
Official race results

Previous race: 2005 Banquet 400	NASCAR Nextel Cup Series; 2005 season	Next race: 2005 Subway 500
