= 2005 Brickyard 400 =

2005 Allstate 400 at the Brickyard
Race details
- Race 21 of 36 in the 2005 NASCAR Nextel Cup Series
- 2005 Brickyard 400 program cover
- Date: August 7, 2005
- Official name: Allstate 400 at the Brickyard
- Location: Indianapolis Motor Speedway in Speedway, Indiana
- Course: Permanent racing facility
- Course length: 2.5 miles (4.023 km)
- Distance: 160 laps, 400 mi (643.738 km)
- Weather: Hot with temperatures approaching 88 °F (31 °C); wind speeds up to 9.2 miles per hour (14.8 km/h)
- Average speed: 118.782 miles per hour (191.161 km/h)

Pole position
Driver	Elliott Sadler	Robert Yates Racing
- Time: 48.882

Most laps led
Driver	Tony Stewart	Joe Gibbs Racing
- Laps: 44

Winner
No. 20	Tony Stewart	Joe Gibbs Racing

Television in the United States
- Network: NBC
- Announcers: Bill Weber, Wally Dallenbach Jr. and Benny Parsons

The 2005 Allstate 400 at The Brickyard, the 12th running of the event, was a NASCAR Nextel Cup Series race held on August 7, 2005, at Indianapolis Motor Speedway in Speedway, Indiana. Contested at 160 laps on the 2.5-mile (4.0-kilometre) speedway, it was the twenty-first race of the 2005 NASCAR Nextel Cup Series season. Tony Stewart of Joe Gibbs Racing won the race.

== Background ==
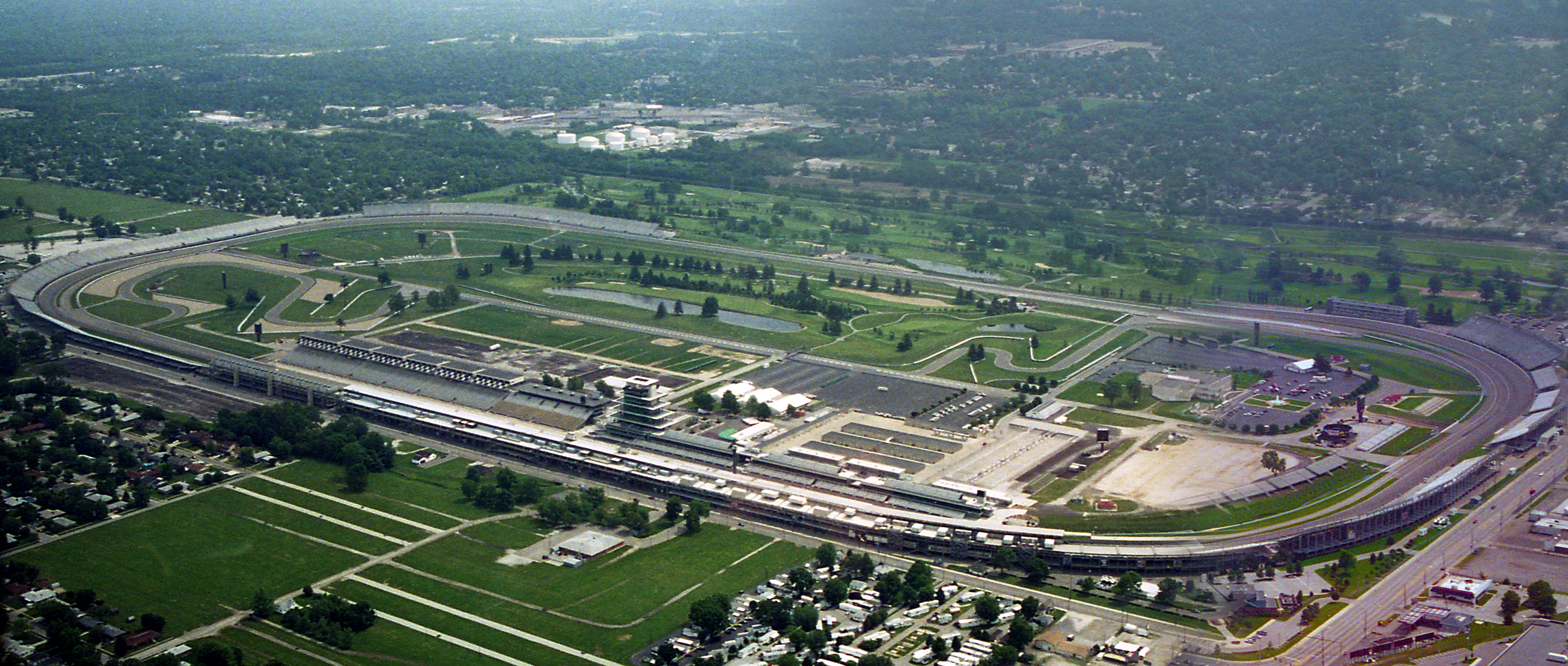
Indianapolis Motor Speedway, the track where the race was held.

The Indianapolis Motor Speedway, located in Speedway, Indiana, (an enclave suburb of Indianapolis) in the United States, is the home of the Indianapolis 500 and the Brickyard 400. It is located on the corner of 16th Street and Georgetown Road, approximately 6 miles (9.7 kilometres) west of Downtown Indianapolis. It is a four-turn rectangular-oval track that is 2.5 miles (4.0 kilometres) long. The track's turns are banked at 9 degrees, while the front stretch, the location of the finish line, has no banking. The back stretch, opposite of the front, also has a zero-degree banking. The racetrack has seats for more than 250,000 spectators.

== Entry list ==
Car #	Driver	Make	Team
0	Mike Bliss	Chevrolet	Gene Haas
00	Kenny Wallace	Chevrolet	Buffy Waltrip
01	Joe Nemechek	Chevrolet	Nelson Bowers
1	Martin Truex Jr.	Chevrolet	Teresa Earnhardt
2	Rusty Wallace	Dodge	Roger Penske
4	Mike Wallace	Chevrolet	Larry McClure
04	Bobby Hamilton	Dodge	Stephanie Hamilton
5	Kyle Busch	Chevrolet	Rick Hendrick
6	Mark Martin	Ford	Jack Roush
07	Dave Blaney	Chevrolet	Richard Childress
7	Robby Gordon	Chevrolet	James Smith
8	Dale Earnhardt Jr.	Chevrolet	Teresa Earnhardt
9	Kasey Kahne	Dodge	Ray Evernham
10	Scott Riggs	Chevrolet	James Rocco
11	Jason Leffler	Chevrolet	J D Gibbs
12	Ryan Newman	Dodge	Roger Penske
15	Michael Waltrip	Chevrolet	Teresa Earnhardt
16	Greg Biffle	Ford	Geoff Smith
17	Matt Kenseth	Ford	Mark Martin
18	Bobby Labonte	Chevrolet	Joe Gibbs
19	Jeremy Mayfield	Dodge	Ray Evernham
20	Tony Stewart	Chevrolet	Joe Gibbs
21	Ricky Rudd	Ford	Glen Wood
22	Scott Wimmer	Dodge	Bill Davis
23	Mike Skinner	Dodge	Gail Davis
24	Jeff Gordon	Chevrolet	Rick Hendrick
25	Brian Vickers	Chevrolet	Mary Hendrick
29	Kevin Harvick	Chevrolet	Richard Childress
31	Jeff Burton	Chevrolet	Richard Childress
32	Bobby Hamilton Jr.	Chevrolet	Calvin Wells III
34	P.J. Jones	Chevrolet	William Edwards
36	Boris Said	Chevrolet	Bob Sutton
37	Kevin Lepage	Dodge	John Carter
38	Elliott Sadler	Ford	Robert Yates
40	Sterling Marlin	Dodge	Felix Sabates
41	Casey Mears	Dodge	Chip Ganassi
42	Jamie McMurray	Dodge	Floyd Ganassi
43	Jeff Green	Dodge	Richard L Petty
44	Terry Labonte	Chevrolet	Rick Hendrick
45	Kyle Petty	Dodge	Kyle Petty
48	Jimmie Johnson	Chevrolet	Jeff Gordon
49	Ken Schrader	Dodge	Elizabeth Morgenthau
50	Jimmy Spencer	Dodge	Don Arnold
51	Stuart Kirby	Chevrolet	Joe Auer
66	Mike Garvey	Ford	Jeff Stec
77	Travis Kvapil	Dodge	Douglas Bawel
88	Dale Jarrett	Ford	Robert Yates
89	Morgan Shepherd	Dodge	Cindy Shepherd
91	Bill Elliott	Dodge	Ray Evernham Sr.
92	Tony Raines	Chevrolet	Bob Jenkins
97	Kurt Busch	Ford	Georgetta Roush
99	Carl Edwards	Ford	Jack Roush

== Practice ==
=== Practice 1 results ===
Pos.	Car #	Driver	Make	SPD	Time	BHND	Best	Laps
1	41	Casey Mears	Dodge	184.873	0:48.682	0.000	0	0
2	10	Scott Riggs	Chevrolet	184.147	0:48.874	0.192	0	0
3	9	Kasey Kahne	Dodge	183.464	0:49.056	0.374	0	0
4	49	Ken Schrader	Dodge	183.445	0:49.061	0.379	0	0
5	25	Brian Vickers	Chevrolet	183.438	0:49.063	0.381	0	0
6	0	Mike Bliss	Chevrolet	183.408	0:49.071	0.389	0	0
7	15	Michael Waltrip	Chevrolet	183.206	0:49.125	0.443	0	0
8	97	Kurt Busch	Ford	183.184	0:49.131	0.449	0	0
9	38	Elliott Sadler	Ford	183.169	0:49.135	0.453	0	0
10	17	Matt Kenseth	Ford	183.027	0:49.173	0.491	0	0
11	48	Jimmie Johnson	Chevrolet	183.016	0:49.176	0.494	0	0
12	20	Tony Stewart	Chevrolet	183.012	0:49.177	0.495	0	0
13	5	Kyle Busch	Chevrolet	182.949	0:49.194	0.512	0	0
14	12	Ryan Newman	Dodge	182.897	0:49.208	0.526	0	0
15	6	Mark Martin	Ford	182.763	0:49.244	0.562	0	0
16	32	Bobby Hamilton Jr.	Chevrolet	182.763	0:49.244	0.562	0	0
17	04	Bobby Hamilton	Dodge	182.760	0:49.245	0.563	0	0
18	23	Mike Skinner	Dodge	182.704	0:49.260	0.578	0	0
19	91	Bill Elliott	Dodge	182.615	0:49.284	0.602	0	0
20	43	Jeff Green	Dodge	182.482	0:49.320	0.638	0	0
21	31	Jeff Burton	Chevrolet	182.437	0:49.332	0.650	0	0
22	21	Ricky Rudd	Ford	182.411	0:49.339	0.657	0	0
23	40	Sterling Marlin	Dodge	182.201	0:49.396	0.714	0	0
24	16	Greg Biffle	Ford	182.105	0:49.422	0.740	0	0
25	36	Boris Said	Chevrolet	182.076	0:49.430	0.748	0	0
26	92	Tony Raines	Chevrolet	182.057	0:49.435	0.753	0	0
27	24	Jeff Gordon	Chevrolet	181.932	0:49.469	0.787	0	0
28	1	Martin Truex Jr.	Chevrolet	181.763	0:49.515	0.833	0	0
29	37	Kevin Lepage	Dodge	181.759	0:49.516	0.834	0	0
30	88	Dale Jarrett	Ford	181.723	0:49.526	0.844	0	0
31	29	Kevin Harvick	Chevrolet	181.565	0:49.569	0.887	0	0
32	7	Robby Gordon	Chevrolet	181.470	0:49.595	0.913	0	0
33	01	Joe Nemechek	Chevrolet	181.302	0:49.641	0.959	0	0
34	22	Scott Wimmer	Dodge	181.291	0:49.644	0.962	0	0
35	4	Mike Wallace	Chevrolet	180.603	0:49.833	1.151	0	0
36	50	Jimmy Spencer	Dodge	180.542	0:49.850	1.168	0	0
37	51	Stuart Kirby	Chevrolet	180.422	0:49.883	1.201	0	0
38	42	Jamie McMurray	Dodge	180.422	0:49.883	1.201	0	0
39	11	Jason Leffler	Chevrolet	180.386	0:49.893	1.211	0	0
40	44	Terry Labonte	Chevrolet	180.339	0:49.906	1.224	0	0
41	19	Jeremy Mayfield	Dodge	180.238	0:49.934	1.252	0	0
42	66	Mike Garvey	Ford	180.231	0:49.936	1.254	0	0
43	8	Dale Earnhardt Jr.	Chevrolet	180.141	0:49.961	1.279	0	0
44	2	Rusty Wallace	Dodge	180.050	0:49.986	1.304	0	0
45	07	Dave Blaney	Chevrolet	179.709	0:50.081	1.399	0	0
46	34	P.J. Jones	Chevrolet	179.426	0:50.160	1.478	0	0
47	18	Bobby Labonte	Chevrolet	179.212	0:50.220	1.538	0	0
48	77	Travis Kvapil	Dodge	178.706	0:50.362	1.680	0	0
49	00	Kenny Wallace	Chevrolet	178.511	0:50.417	1.735	0	0
50	45	Kyle Petty	Dodge	177.862	0:50.601	1.919	0	0
51	99	Carl Edwards	Ford	177.711	0:50.644	1.962	0	0
52	89	Morgan Shepherd	Dodge	172.649	0:52.129	3.447	0	0

== Qualifying ==
Pos	Car #	Driver	Make	Speed	Time	Behind
1	38	Elliott Sadler	Ford	184.117	48.882	0.000
2	19	Jeremy Mayfield	Dodge	183.053	49.166	-0.284
3	15	Michael Waltrip	Chevrolet	182.975	49.187	-0.305
4	9	Kasey Kahne	Dodge	182.838	49.224	-0.342
5	25	Brian Vickers	Chevrolet	182.786	49.238	-0.356
6	12	Ryan Newman	Dodge	182.667	49.270	-0.388
7	24	Jeff Gordon	Chevrolet	182.467	49.324	-0.442
8	40	Sterling Marlin	Dodge	182.467	49.324	-0.442
9	21	Ricky Rudd	Ford	182.286	49.373	-0.491
10	6	Mark Martin	Ford	182.275	49.376	-0.494
11	49	Ken Schrader	Dodge	182.201	49.396	-0.514
12	0	Mike Bliss	Chevrolet	182.065	49.433	-0.551
13	7	Robby Gordon	Chevrolet	181.943	49.466	-0.584
14	29	Kevin Harvick	Chevrolet	181.745	49.520	-0.638
15	43	Jeff Green	Dodge	181.723	49.526	-0.644
16	5	Kyle Busch	Chevrolet	181.657	49.544	-0.662
17	1	Martin Truex Jr.	Chevrolet	181.587	49.563	-0.681
18	11	Jason Leffler	Chevrolet	181.477	49.593	-0.711
19	01	Joe Nemechek	Chevrolet	181.466	49.596	-0.714
20	17	Matt Kenseth	Ford	181.419	49.609	-0.727
21	10	Scott Riggs	Chevrolet	181.357	49.626	-0.744
22	20	Tony Stewart	Chevrolet	181.335	49.632	-0.750
23	42	Jamie McMurray	Dodge	181.262	49.652	-0.770
24	88	Dale Jarrett	Ford	181.032	49.715	-0.833
25	32	Bobby Hamilton Jr.	Chevrolet	180.886	49.755	-0.873
26	22	Scott Wimmer	Dodge	180.861	49.762	-0.880
27	8	Dale Earnhardt Jr.	Chevrolet	180.756	49.791	-0.909
28	45	Kyle Petty	Dodge	180.748	49.793	-0.911
29	31	Jeff Burton	Chevrolet	180.697	49.807	-0.925
30	7	Dave Blaney	Chevrolet	180.466	49.871	-0.989
31	16	Greg Biffle	Ford	180.249	49.931	-1.049
32	36	Boris Said	Chevrolet	180.148	49.959	-1.077
33	91	Bill Elliott	Dodge	180.101	49.972	-1.090
34	23	Mike Skinner	Dodge	180.025	49.993	-1.111
35	04	Bobby Hamilton	Dodge	179.795	50.057	-1.175
36	18	Bobby Labonte	Chevrolet	179.251	50.209	-1.327
37	97	Kurt Busch	Ford	178.547	50.407	-1.525
38	99	Carl Edwards	Ford	178.017	50.557	-1.675
39	77	Travis Kvapil	Dodge	177.546	50.691	-1.809
40	41	Casey Mears*	Dodge	0.000	0.000	0.000
41	2	Rusty Wallace*	Dodge	0.000	0.000	0.000
42	48	Jimmie Johnson	Chevrolet	0.000	0.000	0.000
43	44	Terry Labonte	Chevrolet		50.378	
Failed to qualify
44	37	Kevin Lepage	Dodge		50.108	
45	92	Tony Raines	Chevrolet		50.522	
46	66	Mike Garvey	Ford		50.555	
47	51	Stuart Kirby	Chevrolet		50.626	
48	4	Mike Wallace	Chevrolet		50.709	
49	34	P.J. Jones	Chevrolet		51.157	
50	89	Morgan Shepherd	Dodge		51.210	
51	00	Kenny Wallace	Chevrolet		51.775	
52	50	Jimmy Spencer*	Dodge	0.000	0.000	0.000
WD	80	Carl Long	Chevrolet	0.000	0.000	0.000

Failed to qualify: Kevin Lepage (#37), Tony Raines (#92), Mike Garvey (#66), Stuart Kirby (#51), Mike Wallace (#4), P. J. Jones (#34), Morgan Shepherd (#89), Kenny Wallace (#00), Jimmy Spencer (#50)

*Had accident in qualifying

== Race recap ==
A late race crash by Jimmie Johnson, combined with the win by Stewart, put him into the Nextel Cup points lead. As part of the victory celebration, Tony Stewart went to turn two, where a fan handed him a can of Coca-Cola. Then upon returning to the frontstretch, Tony Stewart climbed the fence, along with the rest of his teammates. Kasey Kahne and Jeremy Mayfield finished 2nd and 4th for Evernham Motorsports. If Bill Elliott had finished in the top 10, all Evernham drivers would have finished in the top 10 for the first time that season.

== Results ==
Fin	St	#	Driver	Make	Laps	Led	Status	Pts
1	22	20	Tony Stewart	Chevy	160	44	running	190
2	4	9	Kasey Kahne	Dodge	160	39	running	175
3	5	25	Brian Vickers	Chevy	160	14	running	170
4	2	19	Jeremy Mayfield	Dodge	160	0	running	160
5	20	17	Matt Kenseth	Ford	160	9	running	160
6	40	41	Casey Mears	Dodge	160	10	running	155
7	10	6	Mark Martin	Ford	160	0	running	146
8	7	24	Jeff Gordon	Chevy	160	0	running	142
9	8	40	Sterling Marlin	Dodge	160	0	running	138
10	16	5	Kyle Busch	Chevy	160	0	running	134
11	12	0	Mike Bliss	Chevy	160	0	running	130
12	38	99	Carl Edwards	Ford	160	0	running	127
13	28	45	Kyle Petty	Dodge	160	1	running	129
14	24	88	Dale Jarrett	Ford	160	0	running	121
15	15	43	Jeff Green	Dodge	160	0	running	118
16	3	15	Michael Waltrip	Chevy	160	0	running	115
17	23	42	Jamie McMurray	Dodge	160	0	running	112
18	37	97	Kurt Busch	Ford	160	0	running	109
19	14	29	Kevin Harvick	Chevy	160	0	running	106
20	29	31	Jeff Burton	Chevy	160	0	running	103
21	31	16	Greg Biffle	Ford	160	0	running	100
22	11	49	Ken Schrader	Dodge	160	0	running	97
23	33	91	Bill Elliott	Dodge	160	0	running	94
24	13	7	Robby Gordon	Chevy	160	1	running	96
25	41	2	Rusty Wallace	Dodge	160	0	running	88
26	26	22	Scott Wimmer	Dodge	160	1	running	90
27	35	04	Bobby Hamilton	Dodge	160	0	running	82
28	19	01	Joe Nemechek	Chevy	160	0	running	79
29	34	23	Mike Skinner	Dodge	160	0	running	76
30	30	07	Dave Blaney	Chevy	160	0	running	73
31	32	36	Boris Said	Chevy	160	0	running	70
32	1	38	Elliott Sadler	Ford	159	39	running	72
33	18	11	Jason Leffler	Chevy	159	0	running	64
34	6	12	Ryan Newman	Dodge	158	0	running	61
35	21	10	Scott Riggs	Chevy	152	0	running	58
36	43	44	Terry Labonte	Chevy	151	2	handling	60
37	39	77	Travis Kvapil	Dodge	146	0	running	52
38	42	48	Jimmie Johnson	Chevy	144	0	crash	49
39	25	32	Bobby Hamilton Jr.	Chevy	119	0	running	46
40	36	18	Bobby Labonte	Chevy	116	0	crash	43
41	9	21	Ricky Rudd	Ford	73	0	crash	40
42	17	1	Martin Truex Jr.	Chevy	62	0	crash	37
43	27	8	Dale Earnhardt Jr.	Chevy	62	0	crash	34

=== Race statistics ===
- Time of race: 3:22:03
- Average speed: 118.782 miles per hour (191.161 km/h)
- Pole speed: 184.117 miles per hour (296.308 km/h)
- Cautions: 10 for 43 laps
- Margin of victory: 0.794 sec
- Lead changes: 15
- Percent of race run under caution: 26.9%
- Average green flag run: 10.6 laps
