= 2005 Dodge Charger 500 =

Race details
- Race 10 of 36 in the 2005 NASCAR Nextel Cup Series
- The 2005 Dodge Charger 500 program cover, featuring Kasey Kahne.
- Date: May 7, 2005
- Official name: Dodge Charger 500
- Location: Darlington Raceway, Darlington County, South Carolina
- Course: Permanent racing facility
- Course length: 1.366 miles (2.198 km)
- Distance: 370 laps, 505.42 mi (813.395 km)
- Scheduled distance: 367 laps, 501.322 mi (806.800 km)
- Weather: Temperatures averaging around 53.8 °F (12.1 °C); wind speeds up to 12.7 miles per hour (20.4 km/h)
- Average speed: 123.031 miles per hour (197.999 km/h)

Pole position
Driver	Kasey Kahne	Evernham Motorsports
- Time: 28.923

Most laps led
Driver	Greg Biffle	Roush Racing
- Laps: 176

Winner
No. 16	Greg Biffle	Roush Racing

Television in the United States
- Network: Fox Broadcasting Company
- Announcers: Mike Joy, Darrell Waltrip and Larry McReynolds

The 2005 Dodge Charger 500, the 56th running of the event, was a NASCAR Nextel Cup Series race held on May 7, 2005, at Darlington Raceway in Darlington County, South Carolina. Contested over 370 laps on the 1.366-mile (2.198-kilometre) speedway, it was the tenth race of the 2005 NASCAR Nextel Cup Series season. The race was extended from 367 laps because of a green–white–checkered finish. Greg Biffle of Roush Racing won the race.

In 2004, Francis Ferko, a shareholder of the company that owned Texas Motor Speedway, sued NASCAR, saying they had violated antitrust laws by refusing to have a second race at Texas Motor Speedway, as many other tracks had. The case was settled in his favor, and NASCAR was forced to give up one of its Darlington dates so that a second race could be held at Texas. In 2005, Darlington was forced to contract down to one race per year. The race was situated on the Saturday of Mother's Day weekend in mid-May, a date that was normally avoided by NASCAR over its history. The Carolina Dodge Dealers, a consortium of Dodge dealerships in North and South Carolina, continued the sponsorship of this race, having it renamed to promote Dodge's Charger automobiles.

== Background ==
Darlington Raceway, nicknamed by many NASCAR fans and drivers as "The Lady in Black" or "The Track Too Tough to Tame" and advertised as a "NASCAR Tradition", is a race track built for NASCAR racing located near Darlington, South Carolina. It is of a unique, somewhat egg-shaped design, an oval with the ends of very different configurations, a condition which supposedly arose from the proximity of one end of the track to a minnow pond the owner refused to relocate. This situation makes it very challenging for the crews to set up their cars' handling in a way that will be effective at both ends.

The track, Darlington Raceway, is a four-turn, 1.366-mile (2.198-kilometre) oval. The track's first two turns are banked at twenty-five degrees, while the final two turns are banked two degrees lower at twenty-three degrees. The front stretch (the location of the finish line) and the back stretch is banked at six degrees. Darlington Raceway can seat up to 60,000 people.

== Entry list ==
Car #	Driver	Make	Team
0	Mike Bliss	Chevrolet	Gene Haas
00	Kenny Wallace	Chevrolet	Buffy Waltrip
01	Joe Nemechek	Chevrolet	Nelson Bowers
2	Rusty Wallace	Dodge	Roger Penske
4	Mike Wallace	Chevrolet	Larry McClure
5	Kyle Busch	Chevrolet	Rick Hendrick
6	Mark Martin	Ford	Jack Roush
07	Dave Blaney	Chevrolet	Richard Childress
7	Robby Gordon	Chevrolet	James Smith
8	Dale Earnhardt Jr	Chevrolet	Teresa Earnhardt
09	Johnny Sauter	Dodge	James Finch
9	Kasey Kahne	Dodge	Ray Evernham
10	Scott Riggs	Chevrolet	James Rocco
11	Jason Leffler	Chevrolet	J D Gibbs
12	Ryan Newman	Dodge	Roger Penske
15	Michael Waltrip	Chevrolet	Teresa Earnhardt
16	Greg Biffle	Ford	Geoff Smith
17	Matt Kenseth	Ford	Mark Martin
18	Bobby Labonte	Chevrolet	Joe Gibbs
19	Jeremy Mayfield	Dodge	Ray Evernham
20	Tony Stewart	Chevrolet	Joe Gibbs
21	Ricky Rudd	Ford	Glen Wood
22	Scott Wimmer	Dodge	Bill Davis
24	Jeff Gordon	Chevrolet	Rick Hendrick
25	Brian Vickers	Chevrolet	Mary Hendrick
29	Kevin Harvick	Chevrolet	Richard Childress
31	Jeff Burton	Chevrolet	Richard Childress
32	Bobby Hamilton Jr.	Chevrolet	Calvin Wells III
34	Jeff Fuller	Chevrolet	William Edwards
37	Kevin Lepage	Dodge	John Carter
38	Elliott Sadler	Ford	Robert Yates
40	Sterling Marlin	Dodge	Felix Sabates
41	Casey Mears	Dodge	Chip Ganassi
42	Jamie McMurray	Dodge	Floyd Ganassi
43	Jeff Green	Dodge	Richard L Petty
45	Kyle Petty	Dodge	Kyle Petty
48	Jimmie Johnson	Chevrolet	Jeff Gordon
49	Ken Schrader	Dodge	Elizabeth Morgenthau
61	Tony Raines	Dodge	Buddy Sisco
66	Hermie Sadler	Ford	Jeff Stec
77	Travis Kvapil	Dodge	Douglas Bawel
80	Carl Long	Chevrolet	Raynard McGlynn
88	Dale Jarrett	Ford	Robert Yates
89	Morgan Shepherd	Dodge	Cindy Shepherd
92	Stanton Barrett	Chevrolet	Bob Jenkins
97	Kurt Busch	Ford	Georgetta Roush
99	Carl Edwards	Ford	Jack Roush

== Qualifying ==
Pos	Car #	Driver	Make	Team	Speed	Time	Behind
1	9	Kasey Kahne	Dodge	Evernham Motorsport	170.024	28.923	0.000
2	12	Ryan Newman	Dodge	Penske Racing	169.555	29.003	-0.080
3	16	Greg Biffle	Ford	Roush Racing	169.222	29.060	-0.137
4	38	Elliott Sadler	Ford	Robert Yates Racing	168.665	29.156	-0.233
5	25	Brian Vickers	Chevrolet	Hendrick Motorsport	168.607	29.166	-0.243
6	5	Kyle Busch	Chevrolet	Hendrick Motorsport	168.089	29.256	-0.333
7	40	Sterling Marlin	Dodge	Chip Ganassi Racing	167.773	29.311	-0.388
8	19	Jeremy Mayfield	Dodge	Evernham Motorsport	167.693	29.325	-0.402
9	48	Jimmie Johnson	Chevrolet	Hendrick Motorsport	167.676	29.328	-0.405
10	99	Carl Edwards	Ford	Roush Racing	167.642	29.334	-0.411
11	97	Kurt Busch	Ford	Roush Racing	167.550	29.350	-0.427
12	2	Rusty Wallace	Dodge	Penske Racing	167.436	29.370	-0.447
13	42	Jamie McMurray	Dodge	Chip Ganassi Racing	167.351	29.385	-0.462
14	24	Jeff Gordon	Chevrolet	Hendrick Motorsport	167.322	29.390	-0.467
15	20	Tony Stewart	Chevrolet	Joe Gibbs Racing	167.322	29.390	-0.467
16	41	Casey Mears	Dodge	Chip Ganassi Racing	167.123	29.425	-0.502
17	77	Travis Kvapil	Dodge	Penske Racing	167.095	29.430	-0.507
18	10	Scott Riggs	Chevrolet	MBV Motorsport	167.083	29.432	-0.509
19	15	Michael Waltrip	Chevrolet	Dale Earnhardt Inc	167.021	29.443	-0.520
20	6	Mark Martin	Ford	Roush Racing	166.953	29.455	-0.532
21	80	Carl Long	Chevrolet	McGlynn Motorsports	166.760	29.489	-0.566
22	88	Dale Jarrett	Ford	Robert Yates Racing	166.388	29.555	-0.632
23	43	Jeff Green	Dodge	Petty Enterprises	166.146	29.598	-0.675
24	29	Kevin Harvick	Chevrolet	Richard Childress Racing	165.995	29.625	-0.702
25	11	Jason Leffler	Chevrolet	Joe Gibbs Racing	165.950	29.633	-0.710
26	32	Bobby Hamilton Jr	Chevrolet	PPI Motorsport	165.855	29.650	-0.727
27	01	Joe Nemechek	Chevrolet	MB2 Motorsport	165.749	29.669	-0.746
28	49	Ken Schrader	Dodge	BAM Racing	165.531	29.708	-0.785
29	0	Mike Bliss	Chevrolet	Haas Automation	165.381	29.735	-0.812
30	07	Dave Blaney	Chevrolet	Richard Childress Racing	165.342	29.742	-0.819
31	17	Matt Kenseth	Ford	Roush Racing	165.331	29.744	-0.821
32	00	Kenny Wallace	Chevrolet	Michael Waltrip Racing	165.076	29.790	-0.867
33	22	Scott Wimmer	Dodge	Bill Davis Racing	165.031	29.798	-0.875
34	31	Jeff Burton	Chevrolet	Richard Childress Racing	165.026	29.799	-0.876
35	21	Ricky Rudd	Ford	Wood Brothers Racing	164.976	29.808	-0.885
36	18	Bobby Labonte	Chevrolet	Joe Gibbs Racing	164.970	29.809	-0.886
37	45	Kyle Petty	Dodge	Petty Enterprises	164.854	29.830	-0.907
38	37	Kevin Lepage	Dodge	R&J Racing	164.722	29.854	-0.931
39	8	Dale Earnhardt Jr	Chevrolet	Dale Earnhardt Inc.	164.628	29.871	-0.948
40	34	Jeff Fuller	Chevrolet	Mach One Motorsport	164.177	29.953	-1.030
41	66	Hermie Sadler	Ford	Peak Performance Motorsport	164.040	29.978	-1.055
42	4	Mike Wallace	Chevrolet	Morgan McClure Motorsport	163.202	30.132	-1.209
43	92	Stanton Barrett	Chevrolet	Front Row Motorsports	163.408	30.094	-1.171
Failed to qualify
44	09	Johnny Sauter	Dodge	Phoenix Racing		30.152	
45	7	Robby Gordon	Chevrolet	Robby Gordon Motorsports		30.233	
46	61	Tony Raines	Dodge	Buddy Sisco Racing		30.249	
47	89	Morgan Shepherd	Dodge	Morgan Shepherd Racing		30.587	
WD	08	Shane Hmiel	Chevrolet		0.000	0.000	0.000
WD	13	Greg Sacks	Dodge		0.000	0.000	0.000

Failed to qualify: Johnny Sauter (No. 09), Robby Gordon (No. 7), Tony Raines (No. 61), Morgan Shepherd (No. 89)

== Race recap ==
Greg Biffle led a race-high 176 of 370 laps en route to his third Nextel Cup victory of 2005. With four laps to go, Biffle's Roush Racing teammate Mark Martin spun out (sliding into the apron) trying to pass third-place runner and pole-sitter Kasey Kahne. Biffle took two tires on his final pit stop, while race leader Ryan Newman and Ken Schrader stayed out. Newman was expecting more of the teams, like Schrader in the #49 Dodge, at the tail of the lead lap (18 in all) to stay out for track position. Newman accelerated on the restart, brake-checked Schrader to hold off the pack, and accelerated again, leaving Schrader spinning his tires. Biffle passed both of them on a green–white–checkered finish restart. Jeff Gordon finished second, followed by Kahne, Martin, and Newman, who fell back three spots in two laps. Schrader finished in 18th position.

== Race results ==
Fin	St	#	Driver	Make	Laps	Led	Status	Pts
1	3	16	Greg Biffle	Ford	370	176	running	190
2	14	24	Jeff Gordon	Chevy	370	20	running	175
3	1	9	Kasey Kahne	Dodge	370	60	running	170
4	20	6	Mark Martin	Ford	370	0	running	160
5	2	12	Ryan Newman	Dodge	370	47	running	160
6	13	42	Jamie McMurray	Dodge	370	0	running	150
7	9	48	Jimmie Johnson	Chevy	370	55	running	151
8	39	8	Dale Earnhardt Jr.	Chevy	370	0	running	142
9	10	99	Carl Edwards	Ford	370	4	running	143
10	15	20	Tony Stewart	Chevy	370	0	running	134
11	27	01	Joe Nemechek	Chevy	370	2	running	135
12	12	2	Rusty Wallace	Dodge	370	0	running	127
13	35	21	Ricky Rudd	Ford	370	0	running	124
14	24	29	Kevin Harvick	Chevy	370	0	running	121
15	22	88	Dale Jarrett	Ford	370	0	running	118
16	5	25	Brian Vickers	Chevy	370	1	running	120
17	36	18	Bobby Labonte	Chevy	370	0	running	112
18	28	49	Ken Schrader	Dodge	370	0	running	109
19	29	0	Mike Bliss	Chevy	370	0	running	106
20	4	38	Elliott Sadler	Ford	369	0	running	103
21	34	31	Jeff Burton	Chevy	369	0	running	100
22	23	43	Jeff Green	Dodge	369	0	running	97
23	6	5	Kyle Busch	Chevy	369	0	running	94
24	42	4	Mike Wallace	Chevy	369	1	running	96
25	33	22	Scott Wimmer	Dodge	368	0	running	88
26	31	17	Matt Kenseth	Ford	367	1	running	90
27	32	00	Kenny Wallace	Chevy	367	0	running	82
28	37	45	Kyle Petty	Dodge	366	0	running	79
29	30	07	Dave Blaney	Chevy	366	0	running	76
30	26	32	Bobby Hamilton Jr.	Chevy	365	0	running	73
31	43	92	Stanton Barrett	Chevy	365	0	running	70
32	38	37	Kevin Lepage	Dodge	363	1	running	72
33	8	19	Jeremy Mayfield	Dodge	333	1	crash	69
34	19	15	Michael Waltrip	Chevy	330	0	running	61
35	17	77	Travis Kvapil	Dodge	323	0	running	58
36	18	10	Scott Riggs	Chevy	311	0	running	55
37	11	97	Kurt Busch	Ford	306	0	running	52
38	25	11	Jason Leffler	Chevy	285	0	running	49
39	16	41	Casey Mears	Dodge	285	0	running	46
40	41	66	Hermie Sadler	Ford	234	0	steering	43
41	7	40	Sterling Marlin	Dodge	221	1	engine	45
42	21	80	Carl Long	Chevy	69	0	rear end	37
43	40	34	Jeff Fuller	Chevy	24	0	transmission	34

== Race statistics ==
- Time of race: 4:06:29
- Average speed: 123.031 miles per hour (197.999 km/h)
- Pole speed: 170.024 miles per hour (273.627 km/h)
- Cautions: 12 for 48 laps
- Margin of victory: 0.990 seconds
- Lead changes: 30
- Percent of race run under caution: 13%
- Average green flag run: 24.8 laps

Previous race: 2005 Aaron's 499	Nextel Cup Series; 2005 season	Next race: 2005 Chevy American Revolution 400
