= A. J. Henriksen =

American stock car driver (born 1979)

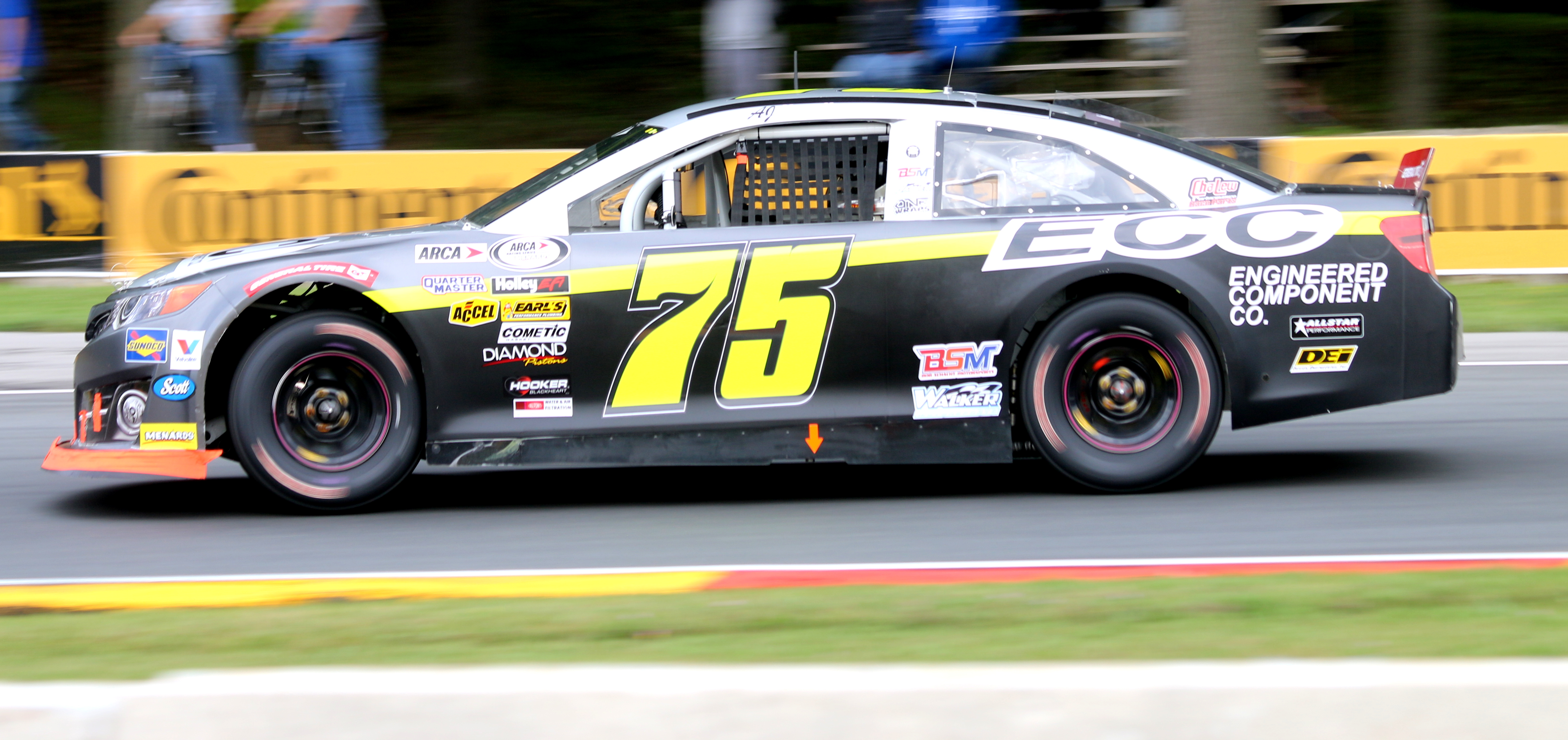
- Henriksen racing at Road America in 2017
- Born: March 27, 1979 (age 47) Chicago, Illinois, U.S.

ARCA Menards Series career
- Debut season: 1995
- Starts: 91
- Championships: 0
- Wins: 0
- Podiums: 0
- Poles: 0
- Best finish: 19th in 2003
- Statistics up to date as of October 20, 2022.

A. J. Henriksen (born March 27, 1979) is an American professional stock car racing driver. He has previously competed in the ARCA Racing Series from 1995 to 2017.

== Early life ==
Henriksen was born in Chicago, Illinois on March 27, 1979, to parents Arne and Barbara Henriksen. He frequently participated in skateboarding competitions and even received sponsorship opportunities from these competitions.

== Racing career ==
Henriksen first gained an interest in racing when he began attending races with his father, and eventually was given the choice to move to San Diego, California, to pursue a skateboarding career or a racing career. He subsequently chose the latter, and began racing in go-karts before progressing to late models, more prominently at Concord Motorsports Park. He also raced in various series such as the USAR Hooters Pro Cup Series, American Truck Series.

Henriksen first raced in the then ARCA Bondo/Mar-Hyde Series in 1995 at the age of sixteen, driving for his father's family-owned team racing in two races that year at Owosso Speedway and Salem Speedway. After racing in a combined eleven races (including three top-ten finishes) in the next four seasons, Henriksen expanded his schedule in 2000, entering in ten races (while failing to qualify for two), and achieving his first top-five at Kentucky with a third-place finish. He would compete in twelve of the twenty-five races in 2001, finishing in the top-ten seven times with a best finish of fourth in Salem. In 2002, he would finish in the top five twice, and the same would said in 2003, which his most notable highlights being his runner-up finish at Charlotte and when he led thirty laps at Chicagoland Speedway before finishing 20th due to cutting a tire late in the race. He would finish a career-best 19th in the points standings in the latter season.

In 2004, Henriksen would downsize his schedule only running in 7 races, finishing in the top-ten three times. It was also during this year that Henriksen attempted to make his Nextel Cup debut at Pocono Raceway in August, driving the No. 90 Ford for Junie Donlavey. He failed to qualify for the event, however, in what was the final attempt for Donlavey Racing before closing down. He would remain in ARCA for the next four years, driving a majority of his races with his family owned team while driving for other teams.

After a two-year hiatus from the series, Henriksen would return in 2011, driving for his family owned team again in two events, failing to qualify at Indianapolis and finishing 11th at Salem. He would then run six races through 2012 and 2013 driving for Venturini Motorsports.

For 2014, Henriksen would not compete in ARCA, but would compete in the Trans Am Series, finishing third at New Jersey Motorsports Park.

In 2017, Henriksen would make one more ARCA start, driving the No. 75 Toyota for Bob Schacht at Road America, where he started fifteenth and finished sixteenth after being involved in a crash on the final lap. He has not run an ARCA race since then, and currently races in the Grand National Super Series Presented By ECC, a series where he was crowned the series champion in 2022 with six wins, eleven runner-up finishes and nineteen top three finishes throughout the year. He would go on to win the 2023 title as well.

Along with still racing, he currently resides as the head of research and new product development at Engineered Components Company.

== Personal life ==
Henriksen currently resides in Dundee Township, Illinois.

== Motorsports career results ==
=== NASCAR ===
(key) (Bold – Pole position awarded by qualifying time. Italics – Pole position earned by points standings or practice time. * – Most laps led.)

==== Nextel Cup Series ====
NASCAR Nextel Cup Series results
Year	Team	No.	Make	1	2	3	4	5	6	7	8	9	10	11	12	13	14	15	16	17	18	19	20	21	22	23	24	25	26	27	28	29	30	31	32	33	34	35	36	NNCC	Pts	Ref
2004	Donlavey Racing	90	Ford	DAY	CAR	LVS	ATL	DAR	BRI	TEX	MAR	TAL	CAL	RCH	CLT	DOV	POC	MCH	SON	DAY	CHI	NHA	POC; DNQ	IND	GLN	MCH	BRI	CAL	RCH	NHA	DOV	TAL	KAN	CLT	MAR	ATL	PHO	DAR	HOM	NA	–	

=== ARCA Racing Series ===
(key) (Bold – Pole position awarded by qualifying time. Italics – Pole position earned by points standings or practice time. * – Most laps led.)

ARCA Racing Series results
Year	Team	No.	Make	1	2	3	4	5	6	7	8	9	10	11	12	13	14	15	16	17	18	19	20	21	22	23	24	25	ARMC	Pts	Ref
1995	ECC Motorsports	77	Buick	DAY	ATL	TAL	FIF	KIL	FRS	MCH	I80	MCS; 25	FRS	POC	POC	KIL	FRS	SBS	LVL	ISF	DSF	SLM; 15	WIN	ATL					NA	–	
1996	ECC Motorsports	77	Buick	DAY	ATL	SLM; 12	TAL	FIF	LVL	CLT	CLT	KIL	FRS	POC	MCH	FRS	TOL; 10	POC	MCH	INF	SBS	ISF	DSF	KIL	SLM; 11	WIN; 18	CLT	ATL	NA	–	
1997	ECC Motorsports	50	Buick	DAY	ATL	SLM; 10	CLT	CLT	POC	MCH	SBS	TOL	KIL	FRS	MIN	POC	MCH	DSF	GTW										NA	–	
1997	ECC Motorsports	77	Buick																	SLM; 13	WIN; 10	CLT	TAL	ISF	ATL				NA	–	
1998	ECC Motorsports	77	Buick	DAY	ATL	SLM	CLT	MEM	MCH	POC	SBS	TOL	PPR	POC	KIL	FRS	ISF	ATL	DSF	SLM; 29	TEX	WIN; DNQ	CLT	TAL	ATL				NA	–	
1999	ECC Motorsports	71	Chevy	DAY	ATL	SLM; DNQ	AND	CLT	MCH	POC	TOL; 30	SBS; 19	BLN; 12	POC	KIL	FRS	FLM	ISF	WIN; DNQ	DSF	SLM	CLT	TAL	ATL					61st	435	
2000	ECC Motorsports	71	Chevy	DAY	SLM; 34	AND	CLT	KIL	FRS							WIN; 24	ISF			SLM; 29	CLT; DNQ	TAL	ATL; DNQ						31st	1120	
2000	ECC Motorsports	71	Ford							MCH; 18	POC; 8	TOL	KEN; 28	BLN	POC; 8			KEN; 3	DSF										31st	1120	
2001	ECC Motorsports	17	Chevy	DAY	NSH; 14	WIN	SLM	GTY; 16				MCH; 10	POC; 27	MEM	GLN		MCH; 22	POC; 10	NSH	ISF	CHI; 7	DSF	SLM; 4	TOL; 8	BLN; 9	CLT	TAL	ATL	21st	1960	
2001	ECC Motorsports	17	Ford						KEN; 27	CLT	KAN					KEN; 6													21st	1960	
2002	ECC Motorsports	17	Chevy	DAY	ATL	NSH	SLM; 7	KEN; 32	CLT	KAN	POC		TOL; 5	SBO; 10						WIN; 30	DSF								25th	1310	
2002	ECC Motorsports	17	Ford									MCH; 4			KEN; 13	BLN	POC; 34	NSH	ISF			CHI; 27	SLM	TAL; 39	CLT				25th	1310	
2003	ECC Motorsports	17	Ford	DAY; 11	ATL; 34	NSH	SLM		KEN; 30	CLT; 5	BLN	KAN	MCH; 10	LER	POC; 24	POC; 7	NSH	ISF					TAL; 34	CLT; 2	SBO				19th	1600	
2003	ECC Motorsports	17	Chevy					TOL; 33											WIN; 30	DSF	CHI; 20	SLM							19th	1600	
2004	ECC Motorsports	17	Ford	DAY; 40	NSH	SLM	KEN	TOL	CLT; 6	KAN	POC; 3	MCH; 3	SBO	BLN	KEN	GTW	POC	LER	NSH				CHI; 36	SLM	TAL; 39				30th	885	
2004	ECC Motorsports	17	Pontiac																	ISF; 23	TOL	DSF							30th	885	
2005	ECC Motorsports	17	Ford	DAY; 20	NSH	SLM	KEN					MCH; 4	KAN	KEN	BLN	POC; DNQ	GTW	LER	NSH	MCH; DNQ	ISF	TOL	DSF						59th	550	
2005	ECC Motorsports	17	Pontiac					TOL; DNQ	LAN	MIL	POC																		59th	550	
2005	James Hylton Motorsports	48	Ford																					CHI; 38					59th	550	
2005	James Hylton Motorsports	48	Chevy																						SLM; 31	TAL			59th	550	
2006	ECC Motorsports	45	Ford	DAY; DNQ	NSH	SLM	WIN	KEN	TOL																				52nd	740	
2006	ECC Motorsports	17	Ford							POC; 4	MCH; 37	KAN	KEN	BLN	POC; 8	GTW	NSH	MCH; 39	ISF	MIL	TOL	DSF	CHI; 34	SLM					52nd	740	
2006	Gerhart Racing	7	Chevy																						TAL; 19	IOW			52nd	740	
2007	Gerhart Racing	7	Chevy	DAY; 40																									89th	255	
2007	Bobby Jones Racing	50	Dodge		USA; DNQ	NSH	SLM	KAN	WIN	KEN	TOL	IOW	POC; 38				POC; 26	NSH	ISF	MIL	GTW	DSF	CHI	SLM	TAL; DNQ	TOL			89th	255	
2007	ECC Motorsports	17	Ford											MCH; 34	BLN	KEN													89th	255	
2008	ECC Motorsports	7	Ford	DAY	SLM	IOW	KAN	CAR; 48	KEN	TOL	POC	MCH; 10	CAY	KEN	BLN	POC; 13	NSH	ISF; 18	DSF; 30										41st	705	
2008	ECC Motorsports	7	Toyota																	CHI; 32	SLM	NJE	TAL; 38	TOL					41st	705	
2011	ECC Motorsports	35	Ford	DAY	TAL	SLM	TOL	NJE	CHI	POC	MCH	WIN	BLN	IOW	IRP; DNQ	POC	ISF												93rd	200	
2011	ECC Motorsports	15	Ford															MAD; 11	DSF	SLM	KAN	TOL							93rd	200	
2012	Venturini Motorsports	66	Toyota	DAY	MOB	SLM	TAL	TOL	ELK	POC; 8	MCH	WIN																	42nd	495	
2012	Venturini Motorsports	66	Chevy										NJE; 18	IOW	CHI	IRP													42nd	495	
2012	Venturini Motorsports	55	Toyota														POC; 15	BLN	ISF	MAD	SLM	DSF	KAN						42nd	495	
2013	Venturini Motorsports	55	Toyota	DAY	MOB	SLM	TAL	TOL	ELK	POC; 7	MCH			CHI; 10	NJM	POC	BLN	ISF	MAD	DSF	IOW	SLM	KEN	KAN					50th	540	
2013	Venturini Motorsports	15	Toyota									ROA; 13	WIN																50th	540	
2017	Bob Schacht Motorsports	75	Toyota	DAY	NSH	SLM	TAL	TOL	ELK	POC	MCH	MAD	IOW	IRP	POC	WIN	ISF	ROA; 16	DSF	SLM	CHI	KEN	KAN						96th	150	

==== Camping World East Series ====
NASCAR Camping World East Series results
Year	Team	No.	Make	1	2	3	4	5	6	7	8	9	10	11	12	13	NCWESC	Pts	Ref
2008	ECC Motorsports	17	Chevy	GRE; DNQ	IOW	SBO	GLN	NHA	TMP	NSH; 18	ADI	LRP	MFD	NHA	DOV	STA	53rd	170	

=== IHRA Late Model Sportsman Series ===
(key) (Bold – Pole position awarded by qualifying time. Italics – Pole position earned by points standings or practice time. * – Most laps led. ** – All laps led.)

IHRA Late Model Sportsman Series
Year	Team	No.	Make	1	2	3	4	5	6	7	8	ISCSS	Pts	Ref
2026	D2 Motorsports	19	Chevy	DUB; 31	CDL	AND	NWP	DUB	MEM	NWP	CAR	-*	-*	
