= Kevin Ray =

American stock car racing driver

- Born: December 11, 1977 (age 48); Eastaboga, Alabama, U.S.

NASCAR O'Reilly Auto Parts Series career
- 1 race run over 1 year
- Best finish: 89th (1995)
- First race: 1995 Kroger 200 (IRP)
Wins	Top tens	Poles
0	0	0

Kevin Ray (born December 11, 1977) is an American former stock car racing driver. Son of Johnny Ray, he is a former competitor in the NASCAR Busch Series and ARCA Racing Series, and was director of business operations for Turner Scott Motorsports.

== Early career ==
Ray began his racing career in midget cars at the age of seven, scoring his first win at age 11. Mentored by Donnie Allison, he entered competition in the ARCA Bondo/Mar-Hyde Supercar Series in 1994 at the age of sixteen, making his debut at Atlanta International Raceway, finishing 38th. He went on to run twenty races in the series between 1994 and 2004, posting a best finish of fourth at Talladega Superspeedway in 1995.

In 1995, Ray made his debut in NASCAR competition, competing in the Busch Series – now the Xfinity Series – at Indianapolis Raceway Park in a car owned by his father, starting 35th and finishing 21st in what would prove to be his only race in the series. He attempted four additional races in the series between 1995 and 2003, driving for his family team and for Sadler Brothers Racing, but failed to qualify for any of them.

== Cup attempt ==
In 2004, Ray signed with Donlavey Racing to drive the team's No. 90 Ford in the Nextel Cup Series for six races, sponsored by Boudreaux's Butt Paste. Attempting his first race at Dover International Speedway, the team failed to pass inspection; the team stepped back to ARCA, racing at Pocono Raceway in Ray's final start in the series, before the deal fell apart. Ray's No. 90 Ford was named the fifth scariest NASCAR paint scheme of all time by ESPN The Magazine in 2008.

== Personal life and post-career ==
Ray is a graduate of Walter Wellborn High School. He is now retired from racing competition but remains active in the sport, serving as team manager for Red Horse Racing from 2007 to 2013.

In January 2014, Ray moved to Turner Scott Motorsports, becoming the team's director of business operations.

== Motorsports career results ==
=== NASCAR ===
(key) (Bold – Pole position awarded by qualifying time. Italics – Pole position earned by points standings or practice time. * – Most laps led.)

==== Nextel Cup Series ====
NASCAR Nextel Cup Series results
Year	Team	No.	Make	1	2	3	4	5	6	7	8	9	10	11	12	13	14	15	16	17	18	19	20	21	22	23	24	25	26	27	28	29	30	31	32	33	34	35	36	NNCC	Pts	Ref
2004	Donlavey Racing	90	Ford	DAY	CAR	LVS	ATL	DAR	BRI	TEX	MAR	TAL	CAL	RCH	CLT	DOV; Wth	POC	MCH	SON	DAY	CHI	NHA	POC	IND	GLN	MCH	BRI	CAL	RCH	NHA	DOV	TAL	KAN	CLT	MAR	ATL	PHO	DAR	HOM	NA	-	

==== Busch Series ====
NASCAR Busch Series results
Year	Team	No.	Make	1	2	3	4	5	6	7	8	9	10	11	12	13	14	15	16	17	18	19	20	21	22	23	24	25	26	27	28	29	30	31	32	33	34	NBSC	Pts	Ref
1995	Ray Motorsports	2	Chevy	DAY	CAR	RCH	ATL	NSV	DAR	BRI	HCY	NHA	NZH	CLT	DOV	MYB	GLN	MLW	TAL	SBO	IRP; 21	MCH	BRI	DAR	RCH	DOV	CLT	CAR; DNQ	HOM									89th	100	
1996	Ray Motorsports	2	Chevy	DAY	CAR	RCH	ATL	NSV	DAR	BRI	HCY	NZH	CLT	DOV	SBO	MYB	GLN	MLW	NHA	TAL; DNQ	IRP	MCH	BRI	DAR	RCH	DOV	CLT	CAR	HOM									NA	-	
1999	Sadler Brothers Racing	95	Chevy	DAY	CAR	LVS	ATL	DAR	TEX	NSV	BRI	TAL	CAL	NHA	RCH	NZH	CLT	DOV	SBO	GLN	MLW	MYB	PPR	GTY	IRP	MCH	BRI	DAR	RCH	DOV	CLT	CAR	MEM; DNQ	PHO	HOM			NA	-	
2003	Sadler Brothers Racing	95	Ford	DAY	CAR	LVS	DAR	BRI	TEX	TAL; DNQ	NSH	CAL	RCH	GTY	NZH	CLT	DOV	NSH	KEN	MLW	DAY	CHI	NHA	PPR	IRP	MCH	BRI	DAR	RCH	DOV	KAN	CLT	MEM	ATL	PHO	CAR	HOM	NA	-	
