= 2000 ARCA Bondo/Mar-Hyde Series =

American stock car series

Seasons
- ← 1999 2001 →

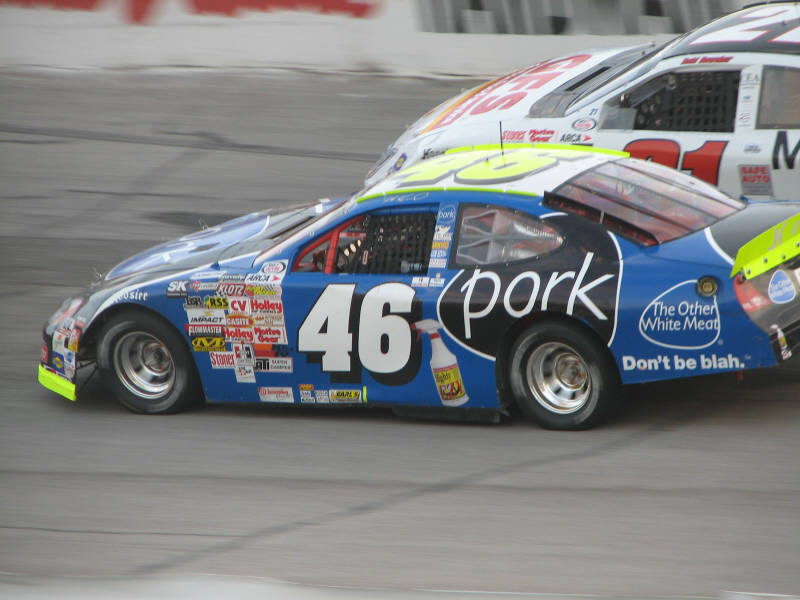
Frank Kimmel, driving the No. 46 car for Clement Racing (pictured in 2006), the 2000 ARCA champion. This was the second of his 10 championships in the series and first of 8 straight.

The 2000 ARCA Bondo/Mar-Hyde Series was the 48th season of the ARCA Racing Series, a division of the Automobile Racing Club of America (ARCA). The season began on February 13, 2000, with the Pro2Call ARCA 200 at Daytona International Speedway. The season ended with the Georgia Boot 400 at Atlanta Motor Speedway on November 20. Frank Kimmel won the drivers championship, his second in the series, and Brian Ross won the Rookie of the Year award. The season was marred by the death of Scott Baker, who was killed in a crash during the Jasper Engines & Transmissions 100 at Toledo Speedway.

== Schedule & Winners ==
Date	Track	City	Event name	Pole winner	Race winner
February 13	Daytona International Speedway	Daytona Beach, Florida	Pro2Call ARCA 200	Kirk Shelmerdine	David Keith
April 30	Salem Speedway	Washington Township, Indiana	Kentuckiana Ford Dealers 200	Brian Ross	Tracy Leslie
May 14	Anderson Speedway	Anderson, Indiana	Penda Truck Accessories 300	Frank Kimmel	Mark Gibson
May 20	Lowe's Motor Speedway	Concord, North Carolina	EasyCare Vehicle Service Contracts 100	Tim Steele	Lyndon Amick
May 26	Kil-Kare Speedway	Xenia Township, Ohio	Kil-Kare ARCA 150	Frank Kimmel	Frank Kimmel
May 27	Flat Rock Speedway	Flat Rock, Michigan	Jasper Engines & Transmissions 150	Brian Ross	Frank Kimmel
June 10	Michigan Speedway	Brooklyn, Michigan	Flagstar 200	Shawna Robinson	Tim Steele
June 17	Pocono Raceway	Long Pond, Pennsylvania	Pocono ARCA 200	Tim Steele	Kerry Earnhardt
June 23	Toledo Speedway	Toledo, Ohio	Jasper Engines & Transmissions 150	Tim Steele	Frank Kimmel
July 2	Kentucky Speedway	Sparta, Kentucky	Kentucky ARCA 200	David Keith	Tim Steele
July 15	Berlin Raceway	Marne, Michigan	Berlin ARCA 200	Tim Steele	Tim Steele
July 22	Pocono Raceway	Long Pond, Pennsylvania	Pepsi ARCA 200	David Keith	Ryan Newman
August 12	Winchester Speedway	White River Township, Indiana	Astral Carrier ARCA 250	Bobby Gerhart	Frank Kimmel
August 20	Illinois State Fairgrounds	Springfield, Illinois	PAR-A-DICE 100	Damon Lusk	Frank Kimmel
August 26	Kentucky Speedway	Sparta, Kentucky	Bluegrass Quality Meats 200	Ryan Newman	Ryan Newman
September 3	DuQuoin State Fairgrounds	Du Quoin, Illinois	Southern Illinois 100	Joe Cooksey	Billy Thomas
September 10	Salem Speedway	Washington Township, Indiana	Eddie Gilstrap Motors Fall Classic 200	Frank Kimmel	Frank Kimmel
October 4	Lowe's Motor Speedway	Concord, North Carolina	EasyCare Vehicle Service Contracts 100	Ryan Newman	Ryan Newman
October 14	Talladega Superspeedway	Lincoln, Alabama	Winn Dixie 300	Kirk Shelmerdine	David Keith
November 20	Atlanta Motor Speedway	Hampton, Georgia	Georgia Boot 400	Frank Kimmel	Bob Strait

=== Drivers' championship ===
(key) Bold – Pole position awarded by time. Italics – Pole position set by final practice results or rainout. * – Most laps led. ** – All laps led.

Pos.	Driver	Races																				Points
Pos.	Driver	DAY	SLM	AND	CLT	KIL	FRS	MCH	POC	TOL	KEN	BLN	POC	WIN	ISF	KEN	DSF	SLM	CLT	TAL	ATL	Points
1	Frank Kimmel	33	2	**18***	29	**1****	1*	13	5	1*	6	2	3	1*	1*	12	2	**1***	7	13	24	4980
2	Bob Strait	3	12	5	5	10	9	5	10	10	2	13	28	15	4	7	15	5	2	33	1	4720
3	Tim Steele		3	13	**3**	2	18	1*	**6**	**2**	1*	**1***	4	13	7	2	21	2	10	2	29	4665
4	Brian Ross	19	**8***	3*	22	12	**2**	4	32	3	36	3	15	2	5	37	5	4	12	31	8	4470
5	Bobby Gerhart	2	27	2	28	5	12	35	17	4	12	14	18	**4**	6	5	12	11	26	5	16	4330
6	Shawna Robinson	13	9	6	23	9	25	**33**	4	7	24	10	36	7	12	10	19	15	13	6	5*	4265
7	Mark Gibson	35	4	1	8	20	24	28	21	5	3	4	10	20	8	8	17	30	21	32	17	4065
8	Joe Cooksey	17	5	21	35	24	27	25	11	8	33	23	12	19	3	16	**4**	7	22	14	12	3965
9	Norm Benning	23	6	8	25	8	17	15	20	19	14	25	11	22	10	15	7	23	24	9	32	3950
10	Andy Belmont	8	25	15	7	6	5	24	18	6	13	16	19	26	33	18	27	25	32	8	38	3765
11	Ron Cox	28	28	20	19	18	26	31	15	12	5	17	35	6	9	17	9	14	27	10	37	3690
12	Chuck Weber	32	24	26	DNQ	21	21	22	23	20	32	19	24	23	24	27	32	20	DNQ	23	25	3005
13	Cavin Councilor	15	15	27	18	23	16	19	35	17	9	9	31	12	15		26	13	38	34		2785
14	Jon Herb	DNQ	11	16	16			11	28		22	27	14	30	35	11	14	22	15	17	30	2610
15	Kirk Shelmerdine	**5***	10	23	36	19	6	17	34	13	DNQ		16						8	**3**	13	2340
16	Mike Harmon	4	31	7	DNQ	26	23	29	38	29	37	21	29	29		32			DNQ	37	22	2045
17	Jim Lamoreaux	DNQ	17	10	37	15	13	21	19	14	16	28	34									1935
18	Richard Hampton		19	9	DNQ	13	10			18	27	11		18	13	22	8	12				1860
19	Damon Lusk	DNQ			20				30		17		9	11	**11**	13	24	9	33		4	1680
20	Curt Piercy	27	14	22	QL	11	8	40		11		7		31	27	DNQ	20	28		19		1670
21	Bob Schacht	37	16	DNQ	31			26	12		19		39	9		6		10	28	16		1545
22	Dan Pardus	7			14			12	3		4		22			35			DNQ	18	11	1530
23	Mike Swaim Jr.	16			9			23	2		8		5						11	24	35	1440
24	Roger Blackstock		21	14		25	7			15		22		8	18		29	18				1415
25	Randy Van Zant		20	28		16	14			25		12		21	14		13	21				1380
26	David Keith	1			40			2	33		**34**		**41**						3	1*	3	1380
27	Marc Brenner	22			15			6	14		15		40			9			23	12	31	1365
28	Billy Venturini				11			10	16		11		7			4			36		9	1320
29	Tracy Leslie	26	1	19	QL	17	20					20		3		14						1265
30	Kerry Earnhardt	39			2			3	1*				2								6	1150
31	A. J. Henriksen		34					18	8		28		8	24		3		29	DNQ		DNQ	1120
32	Ryan Newman							7					1*			**1***			**1***	25		1100
33	Eric Smith					3	3			9		6			31		30					1015
34	Bill Baird	21	7	29	Wth								17		2		3					1005
35	Anthony Hill		32	25							26			14		23			25	22	19	910
36	Robert Burroughs	9			26			8	DNQ		DNQ		13			DNQ			DNQ	27	27	910
37	Mark Stahl	30			DNQ			DNQ	26		21		21			20			DNQ	21	18	900
38	Lyndon Amick	12			1														19	7	14	895
39	Greg Sarff		DNQ	12		22	22	DNQ		26						24		19				805
40	Rich Woodland Jr.				41			9			10					34			14	29	36	760
41	Matt Hutter	DNQ			33			39	9		31		DNQ			DNQ			37	4	39	750
42	Jeff Finley	DNQ	13	DNQ	17	DNQ	DNQ							5				6				740
43	Dill Whittymore	25	29	24	DNQ	27	DNQ															710
44	Mike Buckley	DNQ	22			14	19			22		18										700
45	Mark Voigt	31		DNQ	DNQ	DNQ	DNQ	DNQ	DNQ					27	25		11	8				690
46	Matt Mullins				34			16	13				38						17		34	620
47	Morgan Shepherd				39			36	7				9						DNQ		28	595
48	Justin Labonte				4														20		2	560
49	Robbie Pyle			11		4	11					DNQ										560
50	A. J. Alsup								36		7		33			DNQ			DNQ		7	530
51	Christian Elder	DNQ			24			37					23							15	33	520
52	Karla Lampe		DNQ	17						24		DNQ			19		25					520
53	Vern Slagh							41		21		5		17								510
54	Jason Hedlesky				38			14					25						39		15	495
55	Todd Bowsher													10	29	DNQ	23	24				490
56	George Glick			DNQ	DNQ		28					26		32	23		36					475
57	Ken Schrader			4														3				435
58	Bobby Dotter					7	4															415
59	Rick Sheppard	DNQ						27		23		15										390
60	Charlie Schaefer		30												16		16					385
61	Alan Bigelow										29			16		30	37					360
62	J. R. Robbs				10								20						DNQ	40		360
63	Tim Mitchell														22		18	27				355
64	Jerry Coffman														DNQ		10	16				355
65	Dennis Strickland							DNQ			18					19					40	330
66	Lance Hooper																		16		10	330
67	Andy Hillenburg	6																			21	325
68	Dan Ford Jr.						15			30		29										320
69	Dwayne Leik																			11	20	305
70	Mario Gosselin																		6		26	300
71	Ed Dixon														28		6					290
72	Jerry Hill	10							25													285
73	Randy Churchill									28		8										280
74	Billy Thomas														DNQ		1*					280
75	Jeff Streeter	24	18	DNQ	DNQ	DNQ	DNQ															275
76	Tim Bainey Jr.	DNQ						DNQ	22				27									265
77	Tom Eriksen								27				37		34		34					260
78	Jerry Glanville				27			34		27												250
79	Rick Skinner		26						31				32									245
80	Jeff Fultz				13														30			245
81	Ronnie Bates										23					38			29			240
82	Carl Long	DNQ			6																	240
83	Mark Claussner	DNQ			21			30														230
84	Ed Curtis	DNQ			DNQ			DNQ			DNQ									20		230
85	Jason Jarrett																		4			225
86	Scott Kuhn														17		31					220
87	Willie Green										20					33					DNQ	220
88	C. W. Smith	38							24				DNQ							39		210
89	Gay Weinbroer										25		26									205
90	Ricky Hendrick																		5			205
91	Dennis English		DNQ											DNQ	20		DNQ					205
92	Drew White	DNQ			DNQ			DNQ			35		DNQ							DNQ	DNQ	205
93	Todd Coon		33												21							195
94	Kevin Ray				12				DNQ													195
95	Billy Meazell				DNQ						30					29						190
96	Doug Keller							38							DNQ		22					190
97	Brendan Gaughan																		9			185
98	Rick Tackman					DNQ	DNQ								36			26				175
99	Dave Steele	11																				175
100	David Ray Boggs														30		28					170
101	Ronnie Hornaday	14																				160
102	Scott Baker									16												150
103	Austin Cameron															21					DNQ	150
104	Buddy Schrock																	17				145
105	Joe Nott	18			DNQ																	145
106	Rock Harris																		18			140
107	Bob Kelly	DNQ			DNQ															28		140
108	Rich Hayes														32		33					135
109	Charlie Baker							20														130
110	Shane Huffman	20																				130
111	Kevin Belmont													25	DNQ							130
112	Dion Ciccarelli				DNQ											25					DNQ	130
113	Rick Markle	29																		38		125
114	Brian Conz	DNQ						DNQ				31										125
115	Darrell Lanigan				32*																DNQ	125
116	Bill Flowers																				23	115
117	Lamar Haygood		23																			115
118	Mark Thompson																			26		115
119	Jeff Alsip															28			DNQ			115
120	Ray Clay											24										110
121	David Adcock								29				DNQ									110
122	Randal Ritter	36																		35		105
123	Jimmy Burns	DNQ											30									105
124	Kieran Dynes															26						100
125	Dean Roper														26							100
126	Jason Leffler																		31			100
127	Bill Conger				DNQ			32														95
128	Ryan Vos													28								90
129	Brad Baker																			30		80
130	Bob Hill				30																	80
131	Allen Patterson											30										80
132	Tony Quarles														DNQ		36					80
133	Jeff Beck															31						75
134	Jeff Caudell																	31				75
135	Darrell Basham																	32				70
136	Eric Nale																	33				65
137	Ed Kennedy	34																				60
138	Eric Norris																		34			60
139	Larry Foyt																		35		DNQ	55
140	Johnny Borneman III															36						50
141	Dale Kreider																			36		50
142	Mike Potter								37													45
143	Chad Chaffin	40																				45
144	David Bridges															39						30
145	Robby Benton																		40			30
146	Ed Berrier																				41	30
147	David Donohue																		41			30
148	Michael McNeese	DNQ																				
149	David Simko	DNQ																				
150	Tony Altiere	DNQ																				
151	Tim Horvath	DNQ																				
152	Russell Landrum	DNQ																				
153	Eric Jones	DNQ	DNQ	DNQ	DNQ																	
154	Brad Smith	DNQ			DNQ			DNQ	DNQ													
155	Dick Tracey	DNQ											DNQ							DNQ		
156	Dicky Williamson	DNQ																		DNQ		
157	Dave Renner		DNQ																			
158	Carol Hipp				DNQ																	
159	Mike Osgar				DNQ																	
160	Andy Lombi				DNQ																	
161	Jeff McClure				DNQ																	
162	Sammy Sanders				DNQ			DNQ											DNQ		DNQ	
163	Eric Smith				DNQ								DNQ									
164	Lester Lesneski				DNQ								DNQ						DNQ			
165	David Romines				DNQ															DNQ		
166	Chuck Roumell							DNQ														
167	Grant Andrews Jr.								DNQ													
168	Ed Walkenhorst										DNQ											
169	Phillip Young				Wth															DNQ		
170	Tim Burrell																				DNQ	
171	Scott Wimmer																				DNQ	
172	Todd Shafer																				DNQ	
173	Trent Owens																				DNQ	
174	Rick Thoennes																				DNQ	
175	Tim Sauter																				DNQ	
176	Bill Pratt																				DNQ	
177	Preston Tutt																				DNQ	
178	Mark Cash																		Wth			
Pos.	Driver	DAY	SLM	AND	CLT	KIL	FRS	MCH	POC	TOL	KEN	BLN	POC	WIN	ISF	KEN	DSF	SLM	CLT	TAL	ATL	Points

== See also ==
- 2000 NASCAR Winston Cup Series
- 2000 NASCAR Busch Series
- 2000 NASCAR Craftsman Truck Series
- 2000 NASCAR Goody's Dash Series
