= Eastaboga, Alabama =

Unincorporated community in Alabama, United States

- Unincorporated community
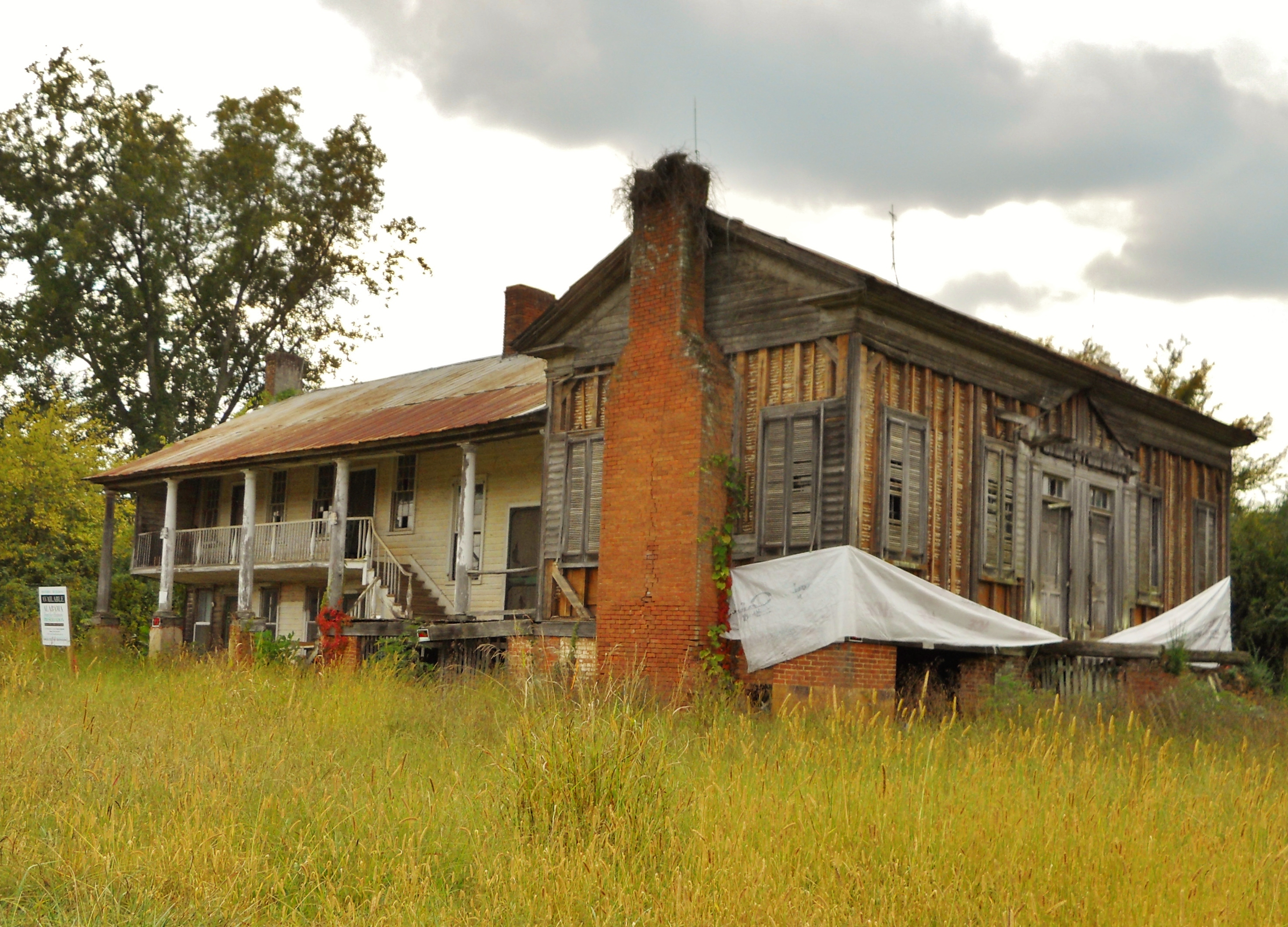
- The Jemison House Complex is located in Eastaboga, Alabama. It was built c. 1840 and placed on the National Register of Historic Places on October 1, 1990

- Location within Alabama Location within the United States
- Coordinates: 33°36′21″N 86°01′17″W
- Country: United States
- State: Alabama
- County: Calhoun
- Elevation: 587 ft (179 m)
- Time zone: UTC-6 (Central (CST))
  - Summer (DST): UTC-5 (CDT)
- ZIP code: 36260
- Area codes: 256 & 938
- GNIS feature ID: 157941

Eastaboga is an unincorporated community on the border of Talladega and Calhoun counties in the U.S. state of Alabama. It was previously called McFall, named for a settling family in the 1850s, and incorporated in 1898, only to be disincorporated in 1901. The original community of Eastaboga was to the south and became known as Old Eastaboga after McFall's name was changed to Eastaboga.

Eastaboga (historically Estaboga) means "where the people reside" in Muscogee, a Native American language.

== Geography ==
Eastaboga is located in the northern part of Talladega County on the border with Calhoun County. The city is located along U.S. Route 78 about 2 mi (3.2 km) north of Interstate 20, which runs west to east south of the community, with access from exit 173. Via I-20, Birmingham is 51 mi (82 km) west, and Atlanta is 100 mi (160 km) east. The largest city of over 20,000 people in the area is Anniston, which is east 13 mi (21 km) via I-20 or US 78.

== Demographics ==
Historical population
Census	Pop.	Note	%±
1900	820		—
U.S. Decennial Census

The present unincorporated community of Eastaboga was listed as the incorporated town of McFall on the 1900 census and had 820 residents. Of that, a majority, 482, lived on the Talladega County side, and 338 lived on the Calhoun County side. It was disincorporated after just 3 years in 1901 and the post office closed under that name in 1906. At some point on, it was renamed Eastaboga (while the nearby community to the south of the same name became "Old Eastaboga").

== Notable people ==
- Howie Camp, former Major League Baseball outfielder for the New York Yankees
- Johnny Ray, NASCAR driver
- Kevin Ray, NASCAR driver

== See also ==
- Old Eastaboga, Alabama
