= Dennis Strickland =

American racing driver

- Born: November 1, 1957 (age 69); Carleton, Michigan, U.S.

ARCA Menards Series career
- 9 races run over 4 years
- Best finish: 65th (2000)
- First race: 2000 Kentucky ARCA 150 (Kentucky)
- Last race: 2013 Menards 200 (Toledo)
| Wins | Top tens | Poles |
|---|---|---|
| 0 | 0 | 0 |
- Statistics up to date as of January 20, 2025.

Dennis Strickland (born November 1, 1957) is an American professional stock car racing driver who has previously competed in the ARCA Racing Series from 2000 to 2013.

Strickland also competed in the ASA CRA Super Series, the Iceman Super Car Series, the Main Event Racing Series, the ARCA Late Model Gold Cup Series, and the Sweet Manufacturing Outlaw Super Late Model Series.

== Motorsports results ==
=== ARCA Racing Series ===
(key) (Bold – Pole position awarded by qualifying time. Italics – Pole position earned by points standings or practice time. * – Most laps led.)

ARCA Racing Series results
| Year | Team | No. | Make | 1 | 2 | 3 | 4 | 5 | 6 | 7 | 8 | 9 | 10 | 11 | 12 | 13 | 14 | 15 | 16 | 17 | 18 | 19 | 20 | 21 | 22 | 23 | 24 | 25 | ARSC | Pts | Ref |
|---|---|---|---|---|---|---|---|---|---|---|---|---|---|---|---|---|---|---|---|---|---|---|---|---|---|---|---|---|---|---|---|
| 2000 | Dave Blair | 90 | Chevy | DAY | SLM | AND | CLT | KIL | FRS | MCH; DNQ | POC | TOL | KEN; 18 | BLN | POC | WIN | ISF | KEN; 19 | DSF | SLM | CLT | TAL | | | | | | | 65th | 330 | |
| 2000 | Curt Piercy | 10 | Ford | | | | | | | | | | | | | | | | | | | | ATL; 40 | | | | | | 65th | 330 | |
| 2001 | Wayne Peterson Racing | 7 | Chevy | DAY | NSH | WIN | SLM | GTY | KEN | CLT | KAN | MCH | POC | MEM | GLN | KEN | MCH | POC | NSH | ISF | CHI | DSF | SLM | TOL; 26 | BLN | CLT | TAL | ATL | 162nd | 100 | |
| 2010 | Wayne Peterson Racing | 06 | Ford | DAY | PBE | SLM | TEX | TAL | TOL | POC | MCH; 38 | IOW | MFD | POC | BLN; 27 | NJE | ISF | CHI | DSF | | | | | | | | | | 68th | 315 | |
| 2010 | Venturini Motorsports | 15 | Chevy | | | | | | | | | | | | | | | | | TOL; 29 | SLM; 27 | KAN | CAR | | | | | | 68th | 315 | |
| 2013 | Roulo Brothers Racing | 17 | Ford | DAY | MOB | SLM | TAL | TOL; 31 | ELK | POC | MCH | ROA | WIN | CHI | NJM | POC | BLN | ISF | MAD | DSF | IOW | SLM | KEN | KAN | | | | | 136th | 75 | |
