= Ed Dixon (racing driver) =

American racing driver

- Born: Edward Carl Dixon; March 13, 1954; Washington, Missouri, U.S.
- Died: October 20, 2022 (aged 68)

ARCA Menards Series career
- 40 races run over 5 years
- Best finish: 4th (1996)
- First race: 1994 Jiffy Lube 300 (Springfield)
- Last race: 2000 Southern Illinois 100 (DuQuoin)
- First win: 1995 Conoco 200 (I80)
Wins	Top tens	Poles
1	21	1
- Statistics up to date as of December 15, 2024.

Edward Carl Dixon (born March 13, 1954 – October 20, 2022) was an American professional stock car racing driver who has previously competed in the ARCA Bondo/Mar-Hyde Series from 1994 to 2000.

Dixon died on October 20, 2022, after a lengthy battle with cancer.

Dixon also competed in series such as the World of Outlaws Late Model Series, the Stacker 2 Xtreme DirtCar Series, the UMP DIRTcar Summer Nationals, and the Northern Allstars Late Model Series.

== Motorsports career results ==
=== ARCA Bondo/Mar-Hyde Series ===
(key) (Bold – Pole position awarded by qualifying time. Italics – Pole position earned by points standings or practice time. * – Most laps led. ** – All laps led.)

ARCA Bondo/Mar-Hyde Series results
Year	Team	No.	Make	1	2	3	4	5	6	7	8	9	10	11	12	13	14	15	16	17	18	19	20	21	22	23	24	25	ABMHSC	Pts	Ref
1994	Ken Schrader Racing	50	Pontiac	DAY	TAL	FIF	LVL	KIL	TOL	FRS	MCH	DMS	POC	POC	KIL	FRS	INF	I70	ISF; 13	DSF; 3	TOL	SLM	WIN	ATL					N/A	0	
1995	Ken Schrader Racing	52	Pontiac	DAY	ATL	TAL	FIF; 10	KIL; 6	FRS	MCH	I80; 1*	MCS	FRS			KIL; 8	FRS; 20	SBS	LVL										22nd	1835	
1995	Ken Schrader Racing	52	Chevy											POC; 9	POC; 7														22nd	1835	
1995	Ken Schrader Racing	50	Pontiac																	ISF; 16	DSF	SLM	WIN						22nd	1835	
1995	Ken Schrader Racing	12	Chevy																					ATL; 35					22nd	1835	
1996	Ken Schrader Racing	51	Pontiac	DAY; 17		SLM; 19				CLT; 11		KIL; 10								INF; 18									4th	5415	
1996	Ken Schrader Racing	51	Chevy		ATL; 8		TAL; 18				CLT; 7				MCH; 10												CLT; 36	ATL; 10	4th	5415	
1996	Ken Schrader Racing	52	Pontiac					FIF; 9	LVL; 6				FRS; 18								SBS; 13	**ISF**; 19*		KIL; 12	SLM; 24	WIN; 7			4th	5415	
1996	Ken Schrader Racing	52	Chevy											POC; 18		FRS; 9	TOL; 4	POC; 6	MCH; 12				DSF; 17						4th	5415	
1999	Ken Schrader Racing	99	Chevy	DAY	ATL	SLM	AND	CLT	MCH	POC	TOL	SBS	BLN	POC	KIL	FRS	FLM	ISF; 4	WIN	DSF; 4	SLM	CLT	TAL	ATL					64th	420	
2000	Ken Schrader Racing	99	Chevy	DAY	SLM	AND	CLT	KIL	FRS	MCH	POC	TOL	KEN	BLN	POC	WIN	ISF; 28	KEN	DSF; 6	SLM	CLT	TAL	ATL						71st	290	
