= Johnny Ray (racing driver) =

American stock car racing driver (1937–2020)

- Born: March 25, 1937; Eastaboga, Alabama, U.S.
- Died: January 27, 2020 (aged 82)

NASCAR Cup Series career
- 8 races run over 3 years
- Best finish: 22nd (1974)
- First race: 1974 Winston 500 (Talladega)
- Last race: 1976 Daytona 500 (Daytona)
Wins	Top tens	Poles
0	0	0

John Ray (March 25, 1937 – January 27, 2020) was an American stock car racing driver. The father of Kevin Ray, he was a competitor in the NASCAR Winston Cup Series.

== Career ==
Ray began his career at the top level of NASCAR competition, the Winston Cup Series (now the NASCAR Monster Energy Cup Series) in 1974, making his debut at Alabama International Motor Speedway (now Talladega Superspeedway); he finished 41st of 50 cars in the event. He went on to race seven more times in the series between 1974 and 1976; his best finish came at Talladega later in 1974, when he finished 22nd. In 1975, Ray, a trucker by profession, set a world speed record for semi-trailer trucks, 92 miles per hour (148 km/h), at Talladega.

== Accident ==
Ray entered the 1976 season planning to compete for Rookie of the Year honors in the Winston Cup Series. Competing in the 1976 Daytona 500, the second race of the season, Ray crashed on the 112th lap, skidding in oil before being hit by Skip Manning. Extricated from his wrecked Chevrolet, Ray was taken to Halifax Medical Center, where he was found to have no vital signs and was initially declared dead; last-ditch resuscitation efforts managed to revive Ray. While he survived the accident, and competed in some local events in Alabama over the next few years, he never participated in NASCAR competition as a driver again.

== Post-accident career ==
Following his recovery, Ray went on to own cars driven by Dale Earnhardt, Johnny Rutherford, and Chuck Bown during the late 1970s; he also owned a team in the 1990s for his son, Kevin Ray, competing on a limited basis in the NASCAR Busch Series and the ARCA Bondo/Mar-Hyde Supercar Series.

Ray, wife Kay, and son John Jnr own John Ray Enterprises LLC, a trucking company established in 1991, after originally starting in 1972 and selling in 1988, the family reacquired the company in 1991 after the new owners went bankrupt. After the September 11 attacks in 2001, the Ray family began driving one of the John Ray Enterprises tractor-trailers around Talladega Superspeedway before the track's Cup races.

== Motorsports career results ==
=== NASCAR ===
(key) (Bold – Pole position awarded by qualifying time. Italics – Pole position earned by points standings or practice time. * – Most laps led.)

==== Winston Cup Series ====
NASCAR Winston Cup Series results
Year	Team	No.	Make	1	2	3	4	5	6	7	8	9	10	11	12	13	14	15	16	17	18	19	20	21	22	23	24	25	26	27	28	29	30	NWCC	Pts
1974	Davis Racing	84	Dodge	RSD	DAY	RCH	CAR	BRI	ATL	DAR	NWS	MAR	TAL; 41	NSV	DOV	CLT	RSD	MCH	DAY	BRI	NSV	ATL	POC	TAL; 22	MCH	DAR	RCH	DOV	NWS	MAR	CLT	CAR	ONT	80th	4.57
1975	Blackwell Racing	77	Chevy	RSD	DAY	RCH	CAR	BRI	ATL	NWS	DAR	MAR	TAL; 48	NSV	DOV	CLT	RSD	MCH; 24	DAY; 30	NSV	POC	TAL; 40	MCH	DAR	DOV	NWS	MAR	CLT	RCH	CAR	BRI	ATL	ONT	73rd	226
1976	Champion Racing	10	Ford	RSD; 31																														105th	67
1976	Blackwell Racing	10	Chevy		DAY; 28	CAR	RCH	BRI	ATL	NWS	DAR	MAR	TAL	NSV	DOV	CLT	RSD	MCH	DAY	NSV	POC	TAL	MCH	BRI	DAR	RCH	DOV	MAR	NWS	CLT	CAR	ATL	ONT	105th	67
