= Curt Piercy =

American racing driver (1962 – 2004)

- Born: Curtis B. Piercy; July 1, 1962; Bloomington, Illinois, U.S.
- Died: March 21, 2004 (aged 41); Harlan County, Kentucky. U.S.

ARCA Menards Series career
- 89 races run over 7 years
- Best finish: 7th (1998)
- First race: 1992 Southern Illinois 250K (DuQuoin)
- Last race: 2000 Winn-Dixie 300 (Talladega)
Wins	Top tens	Poles
0	7	0
- Statistics up to date as of April 20, 2024.

Curtis B. Piercy (born July 1, 1962 – March 21, 2004) was an American professional stock car racing driver. He competed in the ARCA Re/Max Series from 1992 to 2000.

== Racing career ==
Piercy began his racing career driving demolition derby cars.

In 1992, Piercy made his debut in the ARCA Hooters SuperCar Series at the DuQuoin State Fairgrounds dirt-track, driving the No. 88 Chevrolet for Ron Turpin, where he started and finished in 37th after running only nine laps due to engine issues. He then made another start at DuQuoin the following year, this time driving the No. 78 Oldsmobile, where he finished 36th due to a crash three laps in the race. It was also during this year that he tested a NASCAR Winston Cup Series car at Daytona International Speedway. Afterwards, Piercy made a start in the NASCAR Busch All-Star Tour at Mason Speedway, where he finished nineteenth. He then attempted one ARCA race in 1995 at Salem Speedway, but ultimately failed to qualify.

In 1996, Piercy ran fifteen ARCA races, primarily driving for Ron Turpin, where he achieved a best finish of sixth at Salem and finished tenth in the final points standings. He then made seventeen starts for Turpin the following year, this time getting a best finish of twelfth at the Illinois State Fairgrounds dirt-track, and finished eleventh in the points.

In 1998, Piercy ran the full schedule for Turpin, where he achieved two top-ten finishes, both at Springfield and DuQuoin, with a best result of eighth at the former event, on his way to finish seventh in the final points standings. He then ran full-time again the following year, where he achieved two top-ten finishes with a best result of fourth at Berlin Raceway on his way to finish eleventh in the points, before switching to a part time schedule in 2000. After getting two more top-tens that year, Piercy retired from racing after Talladega Superspeedway, where he finished in nineteenth.

== Personal life & death ==
Piercy, alongside his wife Linda, owned both Piercy Auto Body and Piercy Powder Coating, companies based in Carlock, Illinois.

=== Death ===
On March 23, 2004, it was reported that a plane that Piercy was flying had gone missing. Piercy, along with six other passengers, including his wife Linda, Don Maurer and his wife Amy, Brad Webb and his girlfriend Erica Edgington, were said to also have been on board the plane, as all six were flying back from attending the NASCAR Nextel Cup Series race at Darlington Raceway held that week. The remains of the plane were found two days later in a wooded area of Little Black Mountain in Harlan County, Kentucky, where the bodies of Piercy and the other passengers were found dead in the plane.

== Motorsports career results ==
=== ARCA Bondo/Mar-Hyde Series ===
(key) (Bold – Pole position awarded by qualifying time. Italics – Pole position earned by points standings or practice time. * – Most laps led. ** – All laps led.)

ARCA Bondo/Mar-Hyde Series results
Year	Team	No.	Make	1	2	3	4	5	6	7	8	9	10	11	12	13	14	15	16	17	18	19	20	21	22	23	24	25	ABMHSC	Pts	Ref
1992	Ron Turpin	88	Chevy	DAY	FIF	TWS	TAL	TOL	KIL	POC	MCH	FRS	KIL	NSH	DEL	POC	HPT	FRS	ISF	TOL	DSF; 37	TWS	SLM	ATL					N/A	0	
1993	N/A	78	Olds	DAY	FIF	TWS	TAL	KIL	CMS	FRS	TOL	POC	MCH	FRS	POC	KIL	ISF	DSF; 36	TOL	SLM	WIN	ATL							N/A	0	
1995	N/A	N/A	N/A	DAY	ATL	TAL	FIF	KIL	FRS	MCH	I80	MCS	FRS	POC	POC	KIL	FRS	SBS	LVL	ISF	DSF	SLM; DNQ	WIN	ATL					N/A	0	
1996	Ron Turpin	10	Olds	DAY	ATL	SLM; 17	TAL	FIF	LVL; 11	CLT	CLT	KIL; 16	FRS; 17	POC	MCH	FRS; 12	TOL; 22	POC	MCH	INF; 13	SBS; 16	ISF; 26	DSF; 15	KIL; 14	SLM; 6	WIN; 17			10th	2420	
1996	Jane Brewer	9	Chevy																								CLT; 34		10th	2420	
1996	Ron Turpin	9	Chevy																									ATL; 22	10th	2420	
1997	Ron Turpin	9	Pontiac	DAY; 35	ATL; 21																								11th	2445	
1997	Ron Turpin	10	Olds			SLM; 29					SBS; 20	TOL; 15	KIL; 24	FRS; 14	MIN; 18	POC	MCH	DSF; 26	GTW; 26	SLM; 27	WIN; 31	CLT		ISF; 12					11th	2445	
1997	Ron Turpin	10	Pontiac				CLT; 24	CLT; 32	POC	MCH															ATL; 16				11th	2445	
1997	Ron Turpin	10	Chevy																				TAL; 38						11th	2445	
1998	Ron Turpin	51	Chevy	DAY; 32																									7th	4095	
1998	Ron Turpin	10	Pontiac		ATL; 27				MCH; 36	POC; 15		TOL; 18	PPR; 23	POC; 26			ISF; 8		DSF; 9	SLM; 13					ATL; 12				7th	4095	
1998	Ron Turpin	10	Olds			SLM; 23		MEM; 18			SBS; 23				KIL; 24	FRS; 13													7th	4095	
1998	Ron Turpin	66	Pontiac				CLT; 26																						7th	4095	
1998	Ron Turpin	10	Chevy															ATL; 20			TEX; 17		CLT; 23	TAL; 19					7th	4095	
1998	Ron Turpin	10	Ford																			WIN; 29							7th	4095	
1999	Ron Turpin	10	Chevy	DAY; 20			AND; 15	CLT; 33			TOL; 21	SBS; 27	BLN; 4		KIL; 20	FRS; 15	FLM; 30	ISF; 12	WIN; 22	DSF; 8	SLM; 23								11th	3525	
1999	Ron Turpin	10	Pontiac		ATL; 22	SLM; 20			MCH; 27	POC; 26				POC; 18								CLT; DNQ	TAL; 39	ATL; 18					11th	3525	
2000	Ron Turpin	10	Chevy	DAY; 27	SLM; 14	AND; 22	CLT; QL†	KIL; 11	FRS; 8	MCH; 40	POC	TOL; 11	KEN	BLN; 7	POC	WIN; 31	ISF; 27	KEN; DNQ	DSF; 20	SLM; 28	CLT								20th	1670	
2000	Ron Turpin	10	Pontiac																			TAL; 19	ATL						20th	1670	
^{†} - Qualified but replaced by J. R. Robbs
