= Lewis Archer Boswell =

American aviation pioneer

Lewis Archer Boswell (May 9, 1834 – November 26, 1909) was an early aviation pioneer who some believe made the first powered heavier-than-air flight, before the Wright Brothers.

== Biography ==
Born May 9, 1834 in Lunenburg County, Virginia, Boswell went to study at Thomas Jefferson University and later Johns Hopkins University, earning his medical degree. During the Civil War, he worked as a Confederate surgeon in Richmond, Virginia.

In 1868 Boswell began experimenting in aeronautics, but supposedly threw his small model into the Yazoo River that same year. It is unknown why he did this, although speculation points to the purpose of hiding his plans or ending local ridicule. He moved to Eastaboga, Alabama in 1869 with his new wife, where he was granted a patent for an Improvement In Aerial Propeller-Wheels in 1874.

While he continued his study until his death on November 26, 1909, it is unknown if he ever built a full-scale model and attempted flight. In 1900, he wrote a letter to the Secretary of War, asking for funding and promising results, but it was rejected. Locals in his area have made claims that he actually did fly in November 1902, beating the Wright Brothers by a year. In fact, at the time of his death, Boswell was pursuing lawsuit against them, but this action was never carried through by his estate. Other stories tell that he made a short flight after being rolled off a barn roof back in the mid-1890s. However, no conclusive proof has surfaced to support these claims.

== Legacy ==
In 2002, the local airport in Talladega, Alabama was renamed Boswell Field in honor of the local aviator, and according to the Airport Board Chairman, if Boswell made the first heavier than air flight, that would make Boswell Field the first airport.

== See also ==
- Wright Brothers
- Early flying machines
