= Howie Camp =

American baseball player (1893–1960)

- Outfielder
- Born: July 1, 1893; Hopeful, Alabama, U.S.
- Died: May 8, 1960 (aged 66); Eastaboga, Alabama, U.S.
- Batted: Left Threw: Right

MLB debut
- September 19, 1917, for the New York Yankees

Last MLB appearance
- September 22, 1917, for the New York Yankees

MLB statistics
- Batting average: .286
- Home runs: 0
- Runs batted in: 0
- Stats at Baseball Reference

Teams
- New York Yankees (1917)

Howard Lee (Red) Camp (July 1, 1893 – May 8, 1960) was an American Major League Baseball outfielder who played in five games for the 1917 New York Yankees. Camp had six hits in 21 at-bats, with one double. He batted left and threw right-handed.

Camp was born in Hopeful, Alabama, and died in Eastaboga, Alabama.
