= Jim Lamoreaux =

American racing driver

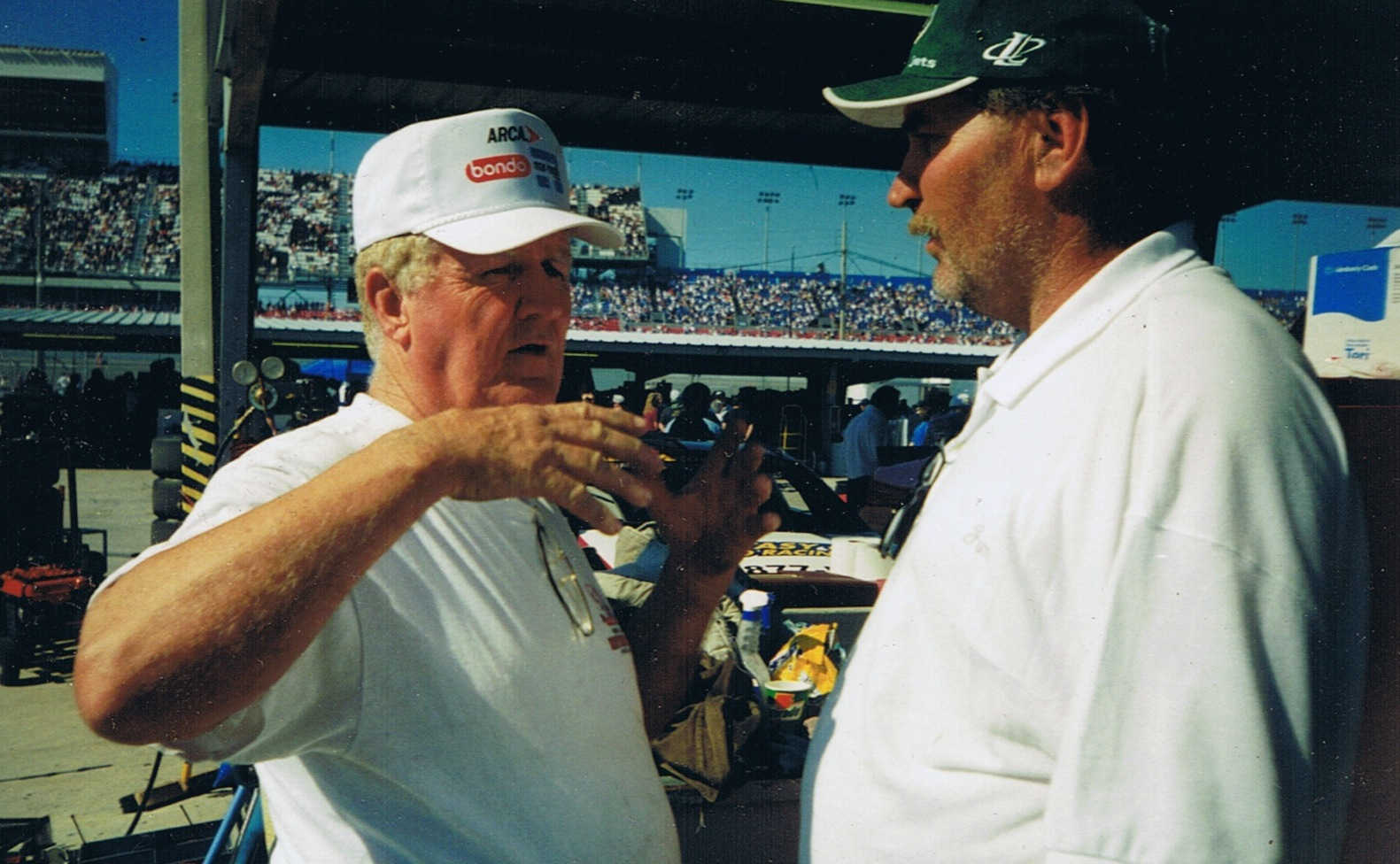
- Lamoreaux (right) with James Hylton (left) at Daytona International Speedway in 1999
- Born: January 25, 1952 (age 74); Sweet Valley, Pennsylvania, U.S.

ARCA Menards Series career
- 30 races run over 4 years
- Best finish: 17th (2000)
- First race: 1997 Mountain Dew 400k (Pocono)
- Last race: 2000 Pepsi ARCA 200 (Pocono)
| Wins | Top tens | Poles |
|---|---|---|
| 0 | 1 | 0 |
- Statistics up to date as of December 3, 2024.

James Lamoreaux (born January 25, 1952) is an American former professional stock car racing driver who has previously competed in the ARCA Bondo/Mar-Hyde Series from 1997 to 2000.

Lamoreaux has also competed in series such as the NASCAR Sportsman Division, the ARTGO Challenge Series, the Mid-Atlantic Asphalt Racing Alliance, the New York Super Stocks Race Series, and the World Series of Asphalt Stock Car Racing.

== Motorsports career results ==
=== ARCA Bondo/Mar-Hyde Series ===
(key) (Bold – Pole position awarded by qualifying time. Italics – Pole position earned by points standings or practice time. * – Most laps led. ** – All laps led.)

ARCA Bondo/Mar-Hyde Series results
| Year | Team | No. | Make | 1 | 2 | 3 | 4 | 5 | 6 | 7 | 8 | 9 | 10 | 11 | 12 | 13 | 14 | 15 | 16 | 17 | 18 | 19 | 20 | 21 | 22 | ABMHSC | Pts | Ref |
|---|---|---|---|---|---|---|---|---|---|---|---|---|---|---|---|---|---|---|---|---|---|---|---|---|---|---|---|---|
| 1997 | DeWilton Genzman | 49 | Pontiac | DAY; DNQ | ATL | SLM | CLT | CLT | | | | | | | | | | | | | | | | | | N/A | 0 | |
| 1997 | James Hylton Motorsports | 49 | Pontiac | | | | | | POC; 31 | MCH | SBS | TOL | KIL | FRS | MIN | POC; 18 | MCH | DSF | GTW | SLM | WIN | CLT | | | | N/A | 0 | |
| 1997 | Julie Buckley | 48 | Pontiac | | | | | | | | | | | | | | | | | | | | TAL; 13 | ISF | ATL | N/A | 0 | |
| 1998 | James Hylton Motorsports | 48 | Pontiac | DAY | ATL; 20 | SLM | CLT | MEM | MCH; 25 | POC; 16 | SBS | TOL | PPR; 22 | POC; 12 | | | | ATL; 40 | DSF | SLM | | | | | | N/A | 0 | |
| 1998 | N/A | 49 | Pontiac | | | | | | | | | | | | KIL; DNQ | FRS | ISF | | | | | | | | | N/A | 0 | |
| 1998 | James Hylton Motorsports | 48 | Olds | | | | | | | | | | | | | | | | | | TEX; 16 | WIN | CLT; 25 | TAL; 24 | ATL; 20 | N/A | 0 | |
| 1999 | James Hylton Motorsports | 48 | Ford | DAY; DNQ | | | | | | | | | | | | | | | | | | | TAL; 13 | | | 39th | 860 | |
| 1999 | James Hylton Motorsports | 48 | Chevy | | ATL; 17 | SLM; DNQ | AND; 21 | CLT | MCH; DNQ | POC; 25 | TOL | SBS | BLN | POC; 24 | KIL | FRS | FLM; 24 | ISF; DNQ | WIN | DSF | SLM | CLT | | ATL; DNQ | | 39th | 860 | |
| 2000 | James Hylton Motorsports | 48 | Ford | DAY; DNQ | | | CLT; 37 | | | MCH; 21 | | | KEN; 16 | | | | | | | | | | | | | 17th | 1935 | |
| 2000 | James Hylton Motorsports | 48 | Pontiac | | SLM; 17 | AND; 10 | | KIL; 15 | FRS; 13 | | | TOL; 14 | | BLN; 28 | | | | | | | | | | | | 17th | 1935 | |
| 2000 | James Hylton Motorsports | 48 | Chevy | | | | | | | | POC; 19 | | | | POC; 34 | WIN | ISF | KEN | DSF | SLM | CLT | TAL | ATL | | | 17th | 1935 | |
