= Hopeful, Alabama =

- Unincorporated community
- Location within Alabama Location within the United States
- Coordinates: 33°29′38″N 85°54′45″W
- Country: United States
- State: Alabama
- County: Talladega
- Elevation: 814 ft (248 m)
- Time zone: UTC-6 (Central (CST))
  - Summer (DST): UTC-5 (CDT)
- Area codes: 256 & 938
- GNIS feature ID: 159798

Hopeful (also, Hopewell, Cheaha, Davis, and Hopefull) is an unincorporated community in Talladega County, Alabama, United States. The community was named for Hopeful Church of Christ, which was founded in 1878 by W. J. Camp.

== Notable people ==
Howie Camp former Major League Baseball player

Rev. Joseph Camp Methodist circuit rider and writer of An Insight into an Insane Asylum

Selocta Chinnabby well known Creek chief and general

Franklin Camp member of the Alabama Christian College board of trustees, editor of the Word of Life, and writer of three well known books.
