= Old Eastaboga, Alabama =

- Unincorporated community
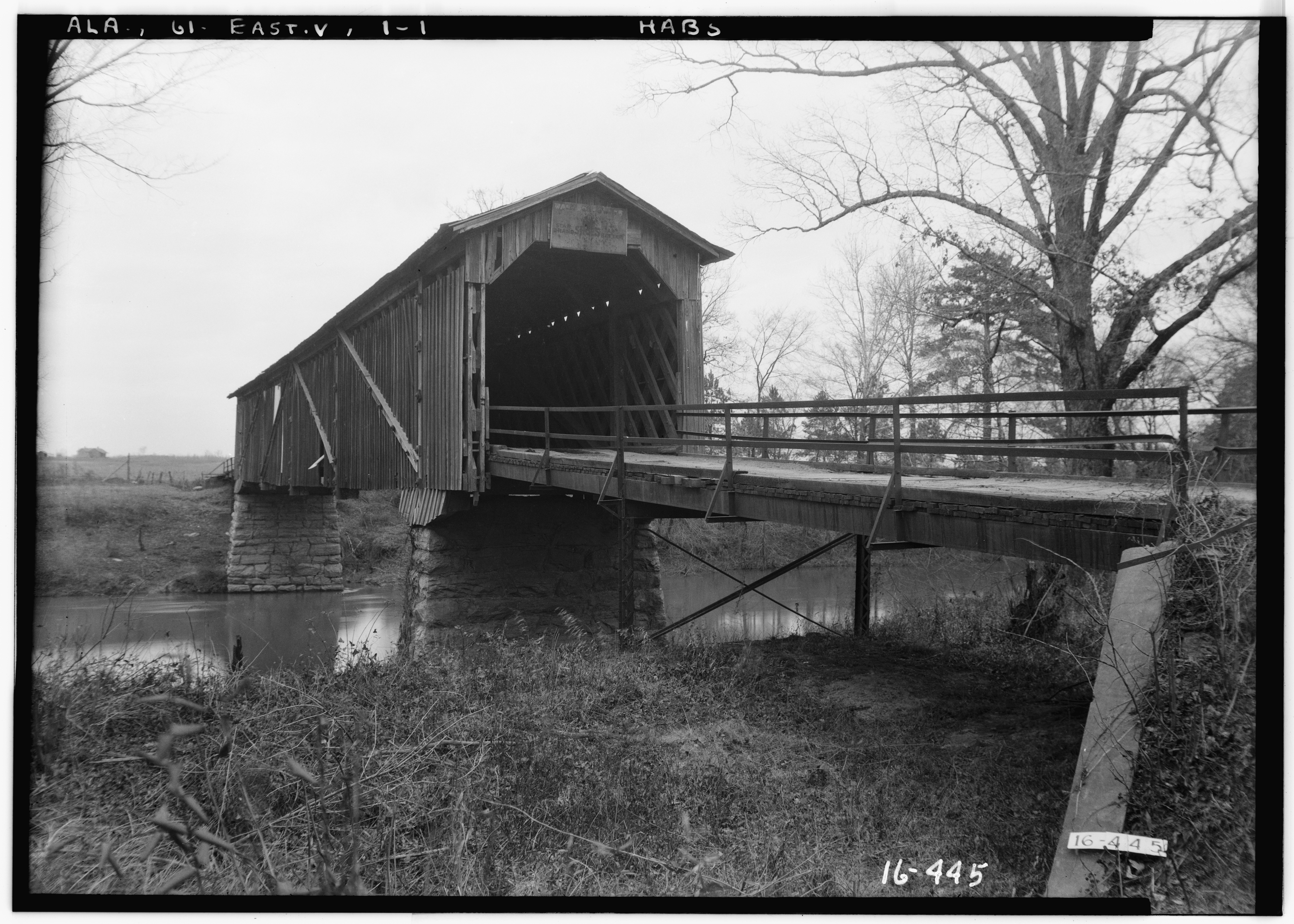
- Covered Bridge spanning Choccolocco Creek, taken in 1935 as part of the Historic American Buildings Survey

- Location within Alabama Location within the United States
- Coordinates: 33°35′11″N 86°01′18″W
- Country: United States
- State: Alabama
- County: Talladega
- Elevation: 561 ft (171 m)
- Time zone: UTC-6 (Central (CST))
  - Summer (DST): UTC-5 (CDT)
- Area codes: 256 & 938
- GNIS feature ID: 152774

Old Eastaboga is an unincorporated community in Talladega County, Alabama, United States. Eastaboga (historically Estaboga) means "where the people reside" in Muscogee. Old Eastaboga was formerly called Eastaboga until the early 20th century, and was briefly listed as an incorporated town on the 1900 and 1910 censuses. The nearby former town of McFall, which was to the north along the railroad, straddling the Talladega and Calhoun County lines, was later renamed Eastaboga (while the original Eastaboga became Old Eastaboga).

== Demographics ==
Historical population
Census	Pop.	Note	%±
1900	398		—
1910	94		−76.4%
U.S. Decennial Census

Eastaboga (spelled as "Estaboga") was listed on the 1900 and 1910 U.S. Censuses as an incorporated town wholly within Talladega County. It presumably incorporated at or prior to 1900. Given its rapid population decline by 1910, it likely lost its charter at some point during that decade.

== Notable people ==
- Lewis Archer Boswell, aviation pioneer
