= 2004 MBNA America 400 "A Salute to Heroes" =

Race details
- Race 13 of 36 in the 2004 NASCAR Nextel Cup Series
- The 2004 MBNA America 400 program cover, honoring the 60th anniversary of D-Day.
- Date: June 6, 2004
- Official name: 36th Annual MBNA America 400 "A Salute to Heroes"
- Location: Dover, Delaware, Dover International Speedway
- Course: Permanent racing facility
- Course length: 1 miles (1.6 km)
- Distance: 400 laps, 400 mi (643.737 km)
- Scheduled distance: 400 laps, 400 mi (643.737 km)
- Average speed: 97.042 miles per hour (156.174 km/h)
- Attendance: 140,000

Pole position
Driver	Jeremy Mayfield	Evernham Motorsports
- Time: 22.288

Most laps led
Driver	Tony Stewart	Joe Gibbs Racing
- Laps: 234

Winner
No. 6	Mark Martin	Roush Racing

Television in the United States
- Network: FX
- Announcers: Mike Joy, Larry McReynolds, Darrell Waltrip

Radio in the United States
- Radio: Motor Racing Network

The 2004 MBNA America 400 "A Salute to Heroes" was the 13th stock car race of the 2004 NASCAR Nextel Cup Series season and the 36th iteration of the event. The race was held on Sunday, June 6, 2004, before a crowd of 140,000 in Dover, Delaware at Dover International Speedway, a 1-mile (1.6 km) permanent oval-shaped racetrack. The race took the scheduled 400 laps to complete. At race's end, Mark Martin of Roush Racing would survive through a wreck-fest to win his 34th career NASCAR Nextel Cup Series win, his first of the season, and would break a 72-race losing streak. To fill out the podium, Tony Stewart of Joe Gibbs Racing finished 2nd, and Dale Earnhardt Jr. of Dale Earnhardt, Inc. finished 3rd.

== Background ==
The layout of Dover International Speedway, the venue where the race was held.

Dover International Speedway is an oval race track in Dover, Delaware, United States that has held at least two NASCAR races since it opened in 1969. In addition to NASCAR, the track also hosted USAC and the NTT IndyCar Series. The track features one layout, a 1-mile (1.6 km) concrete oval, with 24° banking in the turns and 9° banking on the straights. The speedway is owned and operated by Dover Motorsports.

The track, nicknamed "The Monster Mile", was built in 1969 by Melvin Joseph of Melvin L. Joseph Construction Company, Inc., with an asphalt surface, but was replaced with concrete in 1995. Six years later in 2001, the track's capacity moved to 135,000 seats, making the track have the largest capacity of sports venue in the mid-Atlantic. In 2002, the name changed to Dover International Speedway from Dover Downs International Speedway after Dover Downs Gaming and Entertainment split, making Dover Motorsports. From 2007 to 2009, the speedway worked on an improvement project called "The Monster Makeover", which expanded facilities at the track and beautified the track. After the 2014 season, the track's capacity was reduced to 95,500 seats.

=== Entry list ===
#	Driver	Team	Make
0	Ward Burton	Haas CNC Racing	Chevrolet
00	Carl Long*	McGlynn Racing	Chevrolet
01	Joe Nemechek	MBV Motorsports	Chevrolet
2	Rusty Wallace	Penske-Jasper Racing	Dodge
02	Hermie Sadler	SCORE Motorsports	Chevrolet
4	Jimmy Spencer	Morgan–McClure Motorsports	Chevrolet
5	Terry Labonte	Hendrick Motorsports	Chevrolet
6	Mark Martin	Roush Racing	Ford
7	Dave Blaney**	Ultra Motorsports	Dodge
8	Dale Earnhardt Jr.	Dale Earnhardt, Inc.	Chevrolet
9	Kasey Kahne	Evernham Motorsports	Dodge
09	Tony Raines	Phoenix Racing	Dodge
10	Scott Riggs	MBV Motorsports	Chevrolet
12	Ryan Newman	Penske-Jasper Racing	Dodge
15	Michael Waltrip	Dale Earnhardt, Inc.	Chevrolet
16	Greg Biffle	Roush Racing	Ford
17	Matt Kenseth	Roush Racing	Ford
18	Bobby Labonte	Joe Gibbs Racing	Chevrolet
19	Jeremy Mayfield	Evernham Motorsports	Dodge
20	Tony Stewart	Joe Gibbs Racing	Chevrolet
21	Ricky Rudd	Wood Brothers Racing	Ford
22	Scott Wimmer	Bill Davis Racing	Dodge
23	Dave Blaney	Bill Davis Racing	Dodge
24	Jeff Gordon	Hendrick Motorsports	Chevrolet
25	Brian Vickers	Hendrick Motorsports	Chevrolet
29	Kevin Harvick	Richard Childress Racing	Chevrolet
30	Johnny Sauter	Richard Childress Racing	Chevrolet
31	Robby Gordon	Richard Childress Racing	Chevrolet
32	Ricky Craven	PPI Motorsports	Chevrolet
35	Kenny Hendrick**	Gary Keller Racing	Chevrolet
37	Todd Bodine	R&J Racing	Dodge
38	Elliott Sadler	Robert Yates Racing	Ford
40	Sterling Marlin	Chip Ganassi Racing	Dodge
41	Casey Mears	Chip Ganassi Racing	Dodge
42	Jamie McMurray	Chip Ganassi Racing	Dodge
43	Jeff Green	Petty Enterprises	Dodge
45	Kyle Petty	Petty Enterprises	Dodge
48	Jimmie Johnson	Hendrick Motorsports	Chevrolet
49	Ken Schrader	BAM Racing	Dodge
50	Mike Wallace	Arnold Motorsports	Dodge
51	Kevin Lepage	Competitive Edge Motorsports	Chevrolet
52	Stan Boyd*	Rick Ware Racing	Dodge
72	Kirk Shelmerdine	Kirk Shelmerdine Racing	Ford
77	Brendan Gaughan	Penske-Jasper Racing	Dodge
88	Dale Jarrett	Robert Yates Racing	Ford
89	Morgan Shepherd	Shepherd Racing Ventures	Dodge
90	Kevin Ray*	Donlavey Racing	Ford
94	Stanton Barrett	W. W. Motorsports	Chevrolet
97	Kurt Busch	Roush Racing	Ford
98	Larry Gunselman	Mach 1 Motorsports	Ford
99	Jeff Burton	Roush Racing	Ford
Official entry list

*Withdrew due to failing inspection.

**Withdrew for unknown reasons.

== Practice ==
There were three scheduled practices to occur, with one on Friday and two on Saturday. However, the first practice on Saturday would be canceled to rain, so only two practices were held.

=== First practice ===
The first practice session would occur on Friday, June 4, at 11:05 AM EST and would last for one hour and 55 minutes. Jeremy Mayfield of Evernham Motorsports would set the fastest time in the session, with a lap of 22.393 and an average speed of 160.764 miles per hour (258.725 km/h).

Pos.	#	Driver	Team	Make	Time	Speed
1	19	Jeremy Mayfield	Evernham Motorsports	Dodge	22.393	160.764
2	12	Ryan Newman	Penske-Jasper Racing	Dodge	22.494	160.043
3	25	Brian Vickers	Hendrick Motorsports	Chevrolet	22.578	159.447
Full first practice results

=== Second and final practice ===
The second and final practice session, sometimes referred to as Happy Hour, would occur on Saturday, July 24, at 11:10 AM EST and would last for 45 minutes. Kurt Busch of Roush Racing would set the fastest time in the session, with a lap of 23.155 and an average speed of 155.474 miles per hour (250.211 km/h).

Pos.	#	Driver	Team	Make	Time	Speed
1	97	Kurt Busch	Roush Racing	Ford	23.155	155.474
2	19	Jeremy Mayfield	Evernham Motorsports	Dodge	23.198	155.186
3	41	Casey Mears	Chip Ganassi Racing	Dodge	23.199	155.179
Full Happy Hour practice results

== Qualifying ==
Qualifying would occur on Friday, June 4, at 2:30 PM EST. Each driver would have two laps to set a fastest time; the fastest of the two would count as their official qualifying lap. Positions 1-38 would be decided on time, while positions 39–43 would be based on provisionals. Four spots are awarded by the use of provisionals based on owner's points. The fifth is awarded to a past champion who has not otherwise qualified for the race. If no past champ needs the provisional, the next team in the owner points will be awarded a provisional.

Jeremy Mayfield of Evernham Motorsports would win the pole, setting a time of 28.776 and an average speed of 132.360 miles per hour (213.013 km/h).

Two crashes would occur in qualifying. First, Greg Biffle would hit the wall coming out of the second turn on his first lap, causing Biffle to not make a lap and forcing the team to qualify on a provisional. Then, Michael Waltrip would spin and slam the wall on the second lap, causing Waltrip to go to a backup car and start at the rear for the race.

Three drivers would fail to qualify: Hermie Sadler, Todd Bodine, and Larry Gunselman.

=== Full qualifying results ===
Pos.	#	Driver	Team	Make	Time	Speed
1	19	Jeremy Mayfield	Evernham Motorsports	Dodge	22.288	161.522
2	12	Ryan Newman	Penske-Jasper Racing	Dodge	22.410	160.643
3	25	Brian Vickers	Hendrick Motorsports	Chevrolet	22.427	160.521
4	2	Rusty Wallace	Penske-Jasper Racing	Dodge	22.470	160.214
5	77	Brendan Gaughan	Penske-Jasper Racing	Dodge	22.522	159.844
6	38	Elliott Sadler	Robert Yates Racing	Ford	22.568	159.518
7	6	Mark Martin	Roush Racing	Ford	22.634	159.053
8	15	Michael Waltrip	Dale Earnhardt, Inc.	Chevrolet	22.673	158.779
9	42	Jamie McMurray	Chip Ganassi Racing	Dodge	22.674	158.772
10	20	Tony Stewart	Joe Gibbs Racing	Chevrolet	22.679	158.737
11	97	Kurt Busch	Roush Racing	Ford	22.682	158.716
12	9	Kasey Kahne	Evernham Motorsports	Dodge	22.685	158.695
13	24	Jeff Gordon	Hendrick Motorsports	Chevrolet	22.688	158.674
14	48	Jimmie Johnson	Hendrick Motorsports	Chevrolet	22.698	158.604
15	49	Ken Schrader	BAM Racing	Dodge	22.710	158.520
16	40	Sterling Marlin	Chip Ganassi Racing	Dodge	22.728	158.395
17	41	Casey Mears	Chip Ganassi Racing	Dodge	22.736	158.339
18	18	Bobby Labonte	Joe Gibbs Racing	Chevrolet	22.743	158.290
19	43	Jeff Green	Petty Enterprises	Dodge	22.750	158.242
20	94	Stanton Barrett	W. W. Motorsports	Chevrolet	22.811	157.819
21	22	Scott Wimmer	Bill Davis Racing	Dodge	22.821	157.749
22	99	Jeff Burton	Roush Racing	Ford	22.844	157.591
23	10	Scott Riggs	MBV Motorsports	Chevrolet	22.847	157.570
24	31	Robby Gordon	Richard Childress Racing	Chevrolet	22.885	157.308
25	0	Ward Burton	Haas CNC Racing	Chevrolet	22.888	157.288
26	8	Dale Earnhardt Jr.	Dale Earnhardt, Inc.	Chevrolet	22.935	156.965
27	23	Dave Blaney	Bill Davis Racing	Dodge	22.946	156.890
28	21	Ricky Rudd	Wood Brothers Racing	Ford	22.965	156.760
29	88	Dale Jarrett	Robert Yates Racing	Ford	22.989	156.597
30	45	Kyle Petty	Petty Enterprises	Dodge	22.997	156.542
31	32	Ricky Craven	PPI Motorsports	Chevrolet	23.079	155.986
32	01	Joe Nemechek	MBV Motorsports	Chevrolet	23.095	155.878
33	29	Kevin Harvick	Richard Childress Racing	Chevrolet	23.096	155.871
34	5	Terry Labonte	Hendrick Motorsports	Chevrolet	23.106	155.804
35	09	Tony Raines	Phoenix Racing	Dodge	23.115	155.743
36	50	Mike Wallace	Arnold Motorsports	Dodge	23.119	155.716
37	30	Johnny Sauter	Richard Childress Racing	Chevrolet	23.143	155.555
38	51	Kevin Lepage	Competitive Edge Motorsports	Chevrolet	23.158	155.454
Provisionals
39	17	Matt Kenseth	Roush Racing	Ford	23.360	154.110
40	16	Greg Biffle	Roush Racing	Ford	—	—
41	4	Jimmy Spencer	Morgan–McClure Motorsports	Chevrolet	23.283	154.619
42	89	Morgan Shepherd	Shepherd Racing Ventures	Dodge	23.159	155.447
43	72	Kirk Shelmerdine	Kirk Shelmerdine Racing	Ford	24.925	144.433
Failed to qualify or withdrew
44	02	Hermie Sadler	SCORE Motorsports	Chevrolet	23.318	154.387
45	37	Todd Bodine	R&J Racing	Dodge	24.308	148.099
46	98	Larry Gunselman	Mach 1 Motorsports	Ford	—	—
WD	00	Carl Long	McGlynn Racing	Chevrolet	—	—
WD	7	Dave Blaney	Ultra Motorsports	Dodge	—	—
WD	35	Kenny Hendrick	Gary Keller Racing	Chevrolet	—	—
WD	52	Stan Boyd	Rick Ware Racing	Dodge	—	—
WD	90	Kevin Ray	Donlavey Racing	Ford	—	—
Official qualifying results

== Race ==
Pole sitter Jeremy Mayfield would lead the first lap of the race. The first caution flew on lap 12 of the race when Casey Mears crashed on the frontstretch. The race restarted on lap 19 with Mayfield leading but was soon passed by Brian Vickers. Mayfield would take the lead back on lap 26. On lap 31, the second caution flew for it being the competition caution. Tony Stewart won the race off of pit road but a majority of cars stayed out including Jeff Burton who led them back to green on lap 38. But on the same lap in turn 2, Elliott Sadler got turned by Kurt Busch and Sadler took out Brendan Gaughan in the process bringing out the third caution. The race restarted on lap 45. On lap 49, Tony Stewart took the lead from Jeff Burton. On lap 108, the fourth caution flew for debris. Stewart won the race off of pit road and led the field to the restart on lap 115. On lap 119, Jeremy Mayfield took the lead from Stewart. Stewart would eventually take the lead back 32 laps later. On lap 158, the 5th caution flew when Joe Nemechek crashed on the frontstretch after he got turned by Terry Labonte. Stewart won the race off of pit road again and would lead the field to the restart on lap 165. The 6th caution would fly on lap 222 when Jeff Gordon blew a right front tire and hit the wall in turn 2. Stewart won the race off of pit road again and led the field to the restart on lap 231. The 7th caution would fly on lap 233 for debris. The race got back underway on lap 238. Green flag pitstops began on lap 314. Stewart gave up the lead after holding onto it for 154 laps to pit and gave it to Jimmie Johnson. Johnson would pit and gave the lead to Ryan Newman. On lap 320, Newman attempted to come down pit road but came in too fast and ended up spinning out and hitting the tire barriers which brought out the 8th caution of the race. The caution period went on for another 25 laps while crews were making repairs to the barrier. The race restarted on lap 346 with Jeremy Mayfield as the leader. Mayfield would be quickly be passed by his teammate Kasey Kahne.

=== Final laps ===
On the restart in turn 3, the big one struck taking out 19 cars. It started when Dave Blaney came up in front of Michael Waltrip and got turned by Waltrip and spun in turn 3. This would cause a massive chain reaction crash to occur which also collected Ward Burton, Rusty Wallace, Mark Martin, Scott Riggs, Ryan Newman, Greg Biffle, Jeremy Mayfield, Ricky Rudd, Kevin Harvick, Sterling Marlin, Casey Mears, Jamie McMurray, Jeff Green, Jimmie Johnson, Dale Jarrett, Kurt Busch, and Jeff Burton. The race was red flagged to clean up the mess. The race would eventually restart with 46 laps to go with Kahne leading. With 27 laps to go, the 10th caution flew when Rusty Wallace blew a right front tire and hit the wall. Kahne, looking for his first win in his 13th start, led the field to the restart with 20 laps to go. But during the restart, Casey Mears' car began to lay fluid all on the racetrack. However, no caution was thrown. With 19 laps to go, Kasey Kahne went into turn three with the lead with Mark Martin and Tony Stewart following behind him when Kahne's car snapped around on him when his car got into the oil and the car hit the outside wall. Robby Gordon, Matt Kenseth, and Brian Vickers also crashed behind Kahne which brought out the 11th and final caution of the race. In a very heartbreaking way to lose the race, Kasey Kahne's day was all over. Kahne said in his interview that it felt like there was something on the racetrack. The race was red flagged again to clean up the oil. The race restarted with 9 laps to go and Mark Martin held onto the lead and won the race. The race would be Martin's first win since the 2002 Coca-Cola Racing Family 600 which snapped a 73-race winless streak. Only 5 cars finished on the lead lap in the race. Tony Stewart, Dale Earnhardt Jr. Jeff Burton and Scott Riggs rounded out the top 5 while Michael Waltrip, Terry Labonte, Jeremy Mayfield, Scott Wimmer, and Kevin Harvick rounded out the top 10.

In an interview 16 years later on the NASCAR Weekly Podcast on YouTube with YouTubers Eric Estepp, Jaret Lundberg (The Iceberg), Darian Gilliam (Black Flags Matter), Matthew Henson (S1apSh0es), and Daniel Baldwin (DannyBTalks), Mark Martin talked about the race when he mentioned Kahne's spin saying that he "never felt nor saw" any oil on the racetrack.

== Race results ==
Fin	St	#	Driver	Team	Make	Laps	Led	Status	Pts	Winnings
1	7	6	Mark Martin	Roush Racing	Ford	400	19	running	185	$271,900
2	10	20	Tony Stewart	Joe Gibbs Racing	Chevrolet	400	234	running	180	$227,978
3	26	8	Dale Earnhardt Jr.	Dale Earnhardt, Inc.	Chevrolet	400	0	running	165	$186,828
4	22	99	Jeff Burton	Roush Racing	Ford	400	15	running	165	$149,172
5	23	10	Scott Riggs	MBV Motorsports	Chevrolet	400	0	running	155	$126,487
6	8	15	Michael Waltrip	Dale Earnhardt, Inc.	Chevrolet	399	0	running	150	$123,611
7	34	5	Terry Labonte	Hendrick Motorsports	Chevrolet	399	0	running	146	$118,335
8	1	19	Jeremy Mayfield	Evernham Motorsports	Dodge	399	78	running	147	$116,065
9	21	22	Scott Wimmer	Bill Davis Racing	Dodge	398	0	running	138	$104,110
10	33	29	Kevin Harvick	Richard Childress Racing	Chevrolet	398	0	running	134	$116,538
11	29	88	Dale Jarrett	Robert Yates Racing	Ford	398	0	running	130	$107,967
12	11	97	Kurt Busch	Roush Racing	Ford	398	0	running	127	$91,535
13	4	2	Rusty Wallace	Penske-Jasper Racing	Dodge	398	0	running	124	$114,578
14	24	31	Robby Gordon	Richard Childress Racing	Chevrolet	398	0	running	121	$106,022
15	9	42	Jamie McMurray	Chip Ganassi Racing	Dodge	397	0	running	118	$82,510
16	31	32	Ricky Craven	PPI Motorsports	Chevrolet	395	0	running	115	$93,310
17	41	4	Jimmy Spencer	Morgan–McClure Motorsports	Chevrolet	392	0	running	112	$82,125
18	6	38	Elliott Sadler	Robert Yates Racing	Ford	391	0	running	109	$106,243
19	25	0	Ward Burton	Haas CNC Racing	Chevrolet	391	0	running	106	$70,285
20	37	30	Johnny Sauter	Richard Childress Racing	Chevrolet	386	0	running	103	$79,585
21	12	9	Kasey Kahne	Evernham Motorsports	Dodge	381	36	crash	105	$103,960
22	39	17	Matt Kenseth	Roush Racing	Ford	381	0	crash	97	$115,913
23	3	25	Brian Vickers	Hendrick Motorsports	Chevrolet	380	7	crash	99	$76,810
24	2	12	Ryan Newman	Penske-Jasper Racing	Dodge	374	9	running	96	$111,297
25	18	18	Bobby Labonte	Joe Gibbs Racing	Chevrolet	370	0	running	88	$108,938
26	40	16	Greg Biffle	Roush Racing	Ford	370	0	running	85	$74,005
27	5	77	Brendan Gaughan	Penske-Jasper Racing	Dodge	361	0	running	82	$73,335
28	17	41	Casey Mears	Chip Ganassi Racing	Dodge	356	0	running	79	$73,194
29	16	40	Sterling Marlin	Chip Ganassi Racing	Dodge	352	1	crash	81	$97,155
30	28	21	Ricky Rudd	Wood Brothers Racing	Ford	351	0	crash	73	$88,061
31	19	43	Jeff Green	Petty Enterprises	Dodge	349	0	crash	70	$87,605
32	14	48	Jimmie Johnson	Hendrick Motorsports	Chevrolet	345	1	crash	72	$80,995
33	27	23	Dave Blaney	Bill Davis Racing	Dodge	344	0	crash	0	$61,045
34	15	49	Ken Schrader	BAM Racing	Dodge	337	0	running	61	$60,860
35	36	50	Mike Wallace	Arnold Motorsports	Dodge	239	0	wheel bearing	58	$61,570
36	13	24	Jeff Gordon	Hendrick Motorsports	Chevrolet	221	0	crash	55	$107,908
37	30	45	Kyle Petty	Petty Enterprises	Dodge	217	0	handling	52	$60,375
38	32	01	Joe Nemechek	MBV Motorsports	Chevrolet	156	0	crash	49	$68,265
39	43	72	Kirk Shelmerdine	Kirk Shelmerdine Racing	Ford	53	0	handling	46	$60,155
40	35	09	Tony Raines	Phoenix Racing	Dodge	50	0	handling	43	$60,025
41	38	51	Kevin Lepage	Competitive Edge Motorsports	Chevrolet	38	0	transmission	40	$59,895
42	42	89	Morgan Shepherd	Shepherd Racing Ventures	Dodge	9	0	handling	37	$59,800
43	20	94	Stanton Barrett	W. W. Motorsports	Chevrolet	2	0	rear end	34	$59,684
Official race results

Previous race: 2004 Coca-Cola 600	NASCAR Nextel Cup Series; 2004 season	Next race: 2004 Pocono 500
