= 2004 Pennsylvania 500 =

20th race of the 2004 NASCAR Nextel Cup Series

Race details
- Race 20 of 36 in the 2004 NASCAR Nextel Cup Series
- The 2004 Pennsylvania 500 program cover, featuring Ryan Newman, winner of the 2003 race.
- Date: August 1, 2004
- Official name: 32nd Annual Pennsylvania 500
- Location: Long Pond, Pennsylvania, Pocono Raceway
- Course: Permanent racing facility
- Course length: 2.5 miles (4.0 km)
- Distance: 200 laps, 500 mi (804.672 km)
- Scheduled distance: 200 laps, 500 mi (804.672 km)
- Average speed: 126.271 miles per hour (203.213 km/h)
- Attendance: 90,000

Pole position
Driver	Casey Mears	Chip Ganassi Racing
- Time: 52.411

Most laps led
Driver	Jimmie Johnson	Hendrick Motorsports
- Laps: 124

Winner
No. 48	Jimmie Johnson	Hendrick Motorsports

Television in the United States
- Network: TNT
- Announcers: Allen Bestwick, Benny Parsons, Wally Dallenbach Jr.

Radio in the United States
- Radio: Motor Racing Network

The 2004 Pennsylvania 500 was the 20th stock car race of the 2004 NASCAR Nextel Cup Series season and the 32nd iteration of the event. The race was held on Sunday, August 1, 2004, before a crowd of 90,000 in Long Pond, Pennsylvania, at Pocono Raceway, a 2.5 miles (4.0 km) triangular permanent course. The race took the scheduled 200 laps to complete. At race's end, Jimmie Johnson of Hendrick Motorsports would hold off the field on the final restart with five to go to win his 10th career NASCAR Nextel Cup Series win and his fourth win of the season, sweeping both Pocono races in 2004. To fill out the podium, Mark Martin of Roush Racing finished 2nd and Kasey Kahne of Evernham Motorsports finished 3rd.

== Background ==
The layout of Pocono Raceway, the venue where the race was held.

The race was held at Pocono Raceway, which is a three-turn superspeedway located in Long Pond, Pennsylvania. The track hosts two annual NASCAR Sprint Cup Series races, as well as one Xfinity Series and Camping World Truck Series event. Until 2019, the track also hosted an IndyCar Series race.

Pocono Raceway is one of a very few NASCAR tracks not owned by either Speedway Motorsports, Inc. or International Speedway Corporation. It is operated by the Igdalsky siblings Brandon, Nicholas, and sister Ashley, and cousins Joseph IV and Chase Mattioli, all of whom are third-generation members of the family-owned Mattco Inc, started by Joseph II and Rose Mattioli.

Outside of the NASCAR races, the track is used throughout the year by Sports Car Club of America (SCCA) and motorcycle clubs as well as racing schools and an IndyCar race. The triangular oval also has three separate infield sections of racetrack – North Course, East Course and South Course. Each of these infield sections use a separate portion of the tri-oval to complete the track. During regular non-race weekends, multiple clubs can use the track by running on different infield sections. Also some of the infield sections can be run in either direction, or multiple infield sections can be put together – such as running the North Course and the South Course and using the tri-oval to connect the two.

=== Entry list ===
#	Driver	Team	Make
0	Ward Burton	Haas CNC Racing	Chevrolet
01	Joe Nemechek	MBV Motorsports	Chevrolet
2	Rusty Wallace	Penske-Jasper Racing	Dodge
02	Jason Jarrett	SCORE Motorsports	Chevrolet
4	Jimmy Spencer	Morgan–McClure Motorsports	Chevrolet
5	Terry Labonte	Hendrick Motorsports	Chevrolet
6	Mark Martin	Roush Racing	Ford
8	Dale Earnhardt Jr.*	Dale Earnhardt, Inc.	Chevrolet
9	Kasey Kahne	Evernham Motorsports	Dodge
10	Scott Riggs	MBV Motorsports	Chevrolet
12	Ryan Newman	Penske-Jasper Racing	Dodge
13	Greg Sacks	Sacks Motorsports	Dodge
15	Michael Waltrip	Dale Earnhardt, Inc.	Chevrolet
16	Greg Biffle	Roush Racing	Ford
17	Matt Kenseth	Roush Racing	Ford
18	Bobby Labonte	Joe Gibbs Racing	Chevrolet
19	Jeremy Mayfield	Evernham Motorsports	Dodge
20	Tony Stewart	Joe Gibbs Racing	Chevrolet
21	Ricky Rudd	Wood Brothers Racing	Ford
22	Scott Wimmer	Bill Davis Racing	Dodge
24	Jeff Gordon	Hendrick Motorsports	Chevrolet
25	Brian Vickers	Hendrick Motorsports	Chevrolet
29	Kevin Harvick	Richard Childress Racing	Chevrolet
30	Dave Blaney	Richard Childress Racing	Chevrolet
31	Robby Gordon	Richard Childress Racing	Chevrolet
32	Ricky Craven	PPI Motorsports	Chevrolet
37	Andy Hillenburg	R&J Racing	Dodge
38	Elliott Sadler	Robert Yates Racing	Ford
40	Sterling Marlin	Chip Ganassi Racing	Dodge
41	Casey Mears	Chip Ganassi Racing	Dodge
42	Jamie McMurray	Chip Ganassi Racing	Dodge
43	Jeff Green	Petty Enterprises	Dodge
45	Kyle Petty	Petty Enterprises	Dodge
48	Jimmie Johnson	Hendrick Motorsports	Chevrolet
49	Ken Schrader	BAM Racing	Dodge
50	P. J. Jones	Arnold Motorsports	Dodge
51	Kevin Lepage	Competitive Edge Motorsports	Chevrolet
72	Kirk Shelmerdine	Kirk Shelmerdine Racing	Ford
77	Brendan Gaughan	Penske-Jasper Racing	Dodge
80	Carl Long	Hover Motorsports	Ford
88	Dale Jarrett	Robert Yates Racing	Ford
89	Morgan Shepherd	Shepherd Racing Ventures	Dodge
90	A. J. Henriksen	Donlavey Racing	Ford
97	Kurt Busch	Roush Racing	Ford
98	Todd Bodine	Mach 1 Motorsports	Ford
99	Jeff Burton	Roush Racing	Ford
Official entry list

*While Earnhardt Jr. had originally intended to run all of the race, he would eventually exit the car, being replaced by John Andretti on lap 52 due to injuries sustained at a sports car race. Earnhardt Jr. would go onto say that he also did not want to run the race due to problems with the car all weekend. However, as Earnhardt Jr. did start the race, he was credited with the finish.

== Practice ==
Initially, three practices were originally going to be held- one on Friday, and two on Saturday. However, rain on Saturday would cancel the two Saturday practices, only leaving the Friday session to be run.

=== First and final practice ===
The only 2-hour practice session was held on Friday, July 30, at 11:20 AM EST. Joe Nemechek of MBV Motorsports would set the fastest time in the session, with a lap of 52.511 and an average speed of 171.393 miles per hour (275.830 km/h).

Pos.	#	Driver	Team	Make	Time	Speed
1	01	Joe Nemechek	MBV Motorsports	Chevrolet	52.511	171.393
2	48	Jimmie Johnson	Hendrick Motorsports	Chevrolet	52.729	170.684
3	6	Mark Martin	Roush Racing	Ford	52.776	170.532
Full practice results

== Qualifying ==
Qualifying was held on Friday, July 30, at 3:10 PM EST. Each driver would have two laps to set a fastest time; the fastest of the two would count as their official qualifying lap. Positions 1-38 would be decided on time, while positions 39-43 would be based on provisionals. Four spots are awarded by the use of provisionals based on owner's points. The fifth is awarded to a past champion who has not otherwise qualified for the race. If no past champ needs the provisional, the next team in the owner points will be awarded a provisional.

Casey Mears of Chip Ganassi Racing would win his first ever pole, setting a time of 52.411 and an average speed of 171.720 miles per hour (276.357 km/h).

Three drivers would fail to qualify: Kevin Lepage, Andy Hillenburg, and, in Donlavey Racing’s final attempt at a race, A. J. Henriksen.

=== Full qualifying results ===
Pos.	#	Driver	Team	Make	Time	Speed
1	41	Casey Mears	Chip Ganassi Racing	Dodge	52.411	171.720
2	01	Joe Nemechek	MBV Motorsports	Chevrolet	52.431	171.654
3	97	Kurt Busch	Roush Racing	Ford	52.466	171.540
4	40	Sterling Marlin	Chip Ganassi Racing	Dodge	52.553	171.256
5	38	Elliott Sadler	Robert Yates Racing	Ford	52.580	171.168
6	25	Brian Vickers	Hendrick Motorsports	Chevrolet	52.629	171.008
7	42	Jamie McMurray	Chip Ganassi Racing	Dodge	52.634	170.992
8	20	Tony Stewart	Joe Gibbs Racing	Chevrolet	52.698	170.785
9	19	Jeremy Mayfield	Evernham Motorsports	Dodge	52.701	170.775
10	77	Brendan Gaughan	Penske-Jasper Racing	Dodge	52.739	170.652
11	15	Michael Waltrip	Dale Earnhardt, Inc.	Chevrolet	52.748	170.623
12	2	Rusty Wallace	Penske-Jasper Racing	Dodge	52.748	170.623
13	24	Jeff Gordon	Hendrick Motorsports	Chevrolet	52.779	170.522
14	48	Jimmie Johnson	Hendrick Motorsports	Chevrolet	52.796	170.467
15	17	Matt Kenseth	Roush Racing	Ford	52.823	170.380
16	8	Dale Earnhardt Jr.	Dale Earnhardt, Inc.	Chevrolet	52.880	170.197
17	18	Bobby Labonte	Joe Gibbs Racing	Chevrolet	52.934	170.023
18	29	Kevin Harvick	Richard Childress Racing	Chevrolet	53.038	169.690
19	16	Greg Biffle	Roush Racing	Ford	53.065	169.603
20	9	Kasey Kahne	Evernham Motorsports	Dodge	53.083	169.546
21	6	Mark Martin	Roush Racing	Ford	53.084	169.543
22	31	Robby Gordon	Richard Childress Racing	Chevrolet	53.119	169.431
23	99	Jeff Burton	Roush Racing	Ford	53.168	169.275
24	88	Dale Jarrett	Robert Yates Racing	Ford	53.173	169.259
25	45	Kyle Petty	Petty Enterprises	Dodge	53.197	169.182
26	10	Scott Riggs	MBV Motorsports	Chevrolet	53.233	169.068
27	0	Ward Burton	Haas CNC Racing	Chevrolet	53.243	169.036
28	22	Scott Wimmer	Bill Davis Racing	Dodge	53.370	168.634
29	5	Terry Labonte	Hendrick Motorsports	Chevrolet	53.439	168.416
30	12	Ryan Newman	Penske-Jasper Racing	Dodge	53.479	168.290
31	30	Dave Blaney	Richard Childress Racing	Chevrolet	53.591	167.939
32	43	Jeff Green	Petty Enterprises	Dodge	53.602	167.904
33	21	Ricky Rudd	Wood Brothers Racing	Ford	53.707	167.576
34	50	P. J. Jones	Arnold Motorsports	Dodge	53.841	167.159
35	32	Ricky Craven	PPI Motorsports	Chevrolet	53.905	166.960
36	4	Jimmy Spencer	Morgan–McClure Motorsports	Chevrolet	53.956	166.803
37	98	Todd Bodine	Mach 1 Motorsports	Ford	54.058	166.488
38	13	Greg Sacks	Sacks Motorsports	Dodge	54.220	165.990
Provisionals
39	49	Ken Schrader	BAM Racing	Dodge	54.481	165.195
40	89	Morgan Shepherd	Shepherd Racing Ventures	Dodge	54.958	163.761
41	72	Kirk Shelmerdine	Kirk Shelmerdine Racing	Ford	55.432	162.361
42	02	Jason Jarrett	SCORE Motorsports	Chevrolet	54.913	163.896
43	80	Carl Long	Hover Motorsports	Ford	54.328	165.660
Failed to qualify
44	51	Kevin Lepage	Competitive Edge Motorsports	Chevrolet	54.493	165.159
45	37	Andy Hillenburg	R&J Racing	Dodge	55.046	163.500
46	90	A. J. Henriksen	Donlavey Racing	Ford	56.516	159.247
Official qualifying results

== Race results ==
Fin	St	#	Driver	Team	Make	Laps	Led	Status	Pts	Winnings
1	14	48	Jimmie Johnson	Hendrick Motorsports	Chevrolet	200	124	running	190	$276,950
2	21	6	Mark Martin	Roush Racing	Ford	200	11	running	175	$132,895
3	20	9	Kasey Kahne	Evernham Motorsports	Dodge	200	0	running	165	$131,645
4	19	16	Greg Biffle	Roush Racing	Ford	200	0	running	160	$98,430
5	13	24	Jeff Gordon	Hendrick Motorsports	Chevrolet	200	11	running	160	$121,728
6	29	5	Terry Labonte	Hendrick Motorsports	Chevrolet	200	0	running	150	$103,440
7	22	31	Robby Gordon	Richard Childress Racing	Chevrolet	200	0	running	146	$105,827
8	15	17	Matt Kenseth	Roush Racing	Ford	200	0	running	142	$113,968
9	9	19	Jeremy Mayfield	Evernham Motorsports	Dodge	200	0	running	138	$92,490
10	5	38	Elliott Sadler	Robert Yates Racing	Ford	200	0	running	134	$101,823
11	28	22	Scott Wimmer	Bill Davis Racing	Dodge	200	0	running	130	$87,040
12	33	21	Ricky Rudd	Wood Brothers Racing	Ford	200	1	running	132	$87,506
13	30	12	Ryan Newman	Penske-Jasper Racing	Dodge	200	0	running	124	$103,457
14	6	25	Brian Vickers	Hendrick Motorsports	Chevrolet	200	0	running	121	$69,215
15	4	40	Sterling Marlin	Chip Ganassi Racing	Dodge	200	0	running	118	$94,290
16	2	01	Joe Nemechek	MBV Motorsports	Chevrolet	200	31	running	120	$85,590
17	12	2	Rusty Wallace	Penske-Jasper Racing	Dodge	200	0	running	112	$99,423
18	1	41	Casey Mears	Chip Ganassi Racing	Dodge	200	17	running	114	$82,215
19	25	45	Kyle Petty	Petty Enterprises	Dodge	200	0	running	106	$67,029
20	35	32	Ricky Craven	PPI Motorsports	Chevrolet	200	0	running	103	$68,265
21	39	49	Ken Schrader	BAM Racing	Dodge	200	1	running	105	$57,990
22	26	10	Scott Riggs	MBV Motorsports	Chevrolet	200	0	running	97	$82,877
23	36	4	Jimmy Spencer	Morgan–McClure Motorsports	Chevrolet	199	0	running	94	$58,290
24	24	88	Dale Jarrett	Robert Yates Racing	Ford	194	1	running	96	$88,032
25	16	8	Dale Earnhardt Jr.	Dale Earnhardt, Inc.	Chevrolet	193	0	running	88	$101,093
26	3	97	Kurt Busch	Roush Racing	Ford	192	0	transmission	85	$74,165
27	31	30	Dave Blaney	Richard Childress Racing	Chevrolet	187	2	running	87	$64,615
28	10	77	Brendan Gaughan	Penske-Jasper Racing	Dodge	177	0	crash	79	$63,965
29	17	18	Bobby Labonte	Joe Gibbs Racing	Chevrolet	176	0	crash	76	$98,373
30	7	42	Jamie McMurray	Chip Ganassi Racing	Dodge	170	0	engine	73	$61,640
31	27	0	Ward Burton	Haas CNC Racing	Chevrolet	162	0	transmission	70	$52,990
32	18	29	Kevin Harvick	Richard Childress Racing	Chevrolet	141	0	engine	67	$88,618
33	32	43	Jeff Green	Petty Enterprises	Dodge	128	1	engine	69	$78,890
34	23	99	Jeff Burton	Roush Racing	Ford	126	0	handling	61	$86,782
35	8	20	Tony Stewart	Joe Gibbs Racing	Chevrolet	108	0	crash	58	$99,043
36	11	15	Michael Waltrip	Dale Earnhardt, Inc.	Chevrolet	100	0	engine	55	$88,121
37	40	89	Morgan Shepherd	Shepherd Racing Ventures	Dodge	79	0	engine	52	$51,900
38	37	98	Todd Bodine	Mach 1 Motorsports	Ford	72	0	engine	49	$51,785
39	43	80	Carl Long	Hover Motorsports	Ford	44	0	too slow	46	$51,660
40	42	02	Jason Jarrett	SCORE Motorsports	Chevrolet	40	0	handling	43	$51,505
41	41	72	Kirk Shelmerdine	Kirk Shelmerdine Racing	Ford	40	0	too slow	40	$51,365
42	38	13	Greg Sacks	Sacks Motorsports	Dodge	19	0	vibration	37	$51,275
43	34	50	P. J. Jones	Arnold Motorsports	Dodge	8	0	brakes	34	$51,459
Official race results

Previous race: 2004 Siemens 300	NASCAR Nextel Cup Series; 2004 season	Next race: 2004 Brickyard 400
