= J. R. Robbs =

American racing driver

- Born: January 1, 1979 (age 47); Gaffney, South Carolina, U.S.

NASCAR O'Reilly Auto Parts Series career
- 3 races run over 2 years
- Best finish: 94th (2003)
- First race: 2003 Charter Pipeline 250 (Gateway)
- Last race: 2003 MBNA Armed Forces Family 200 (Dover)
Wins	Top tens	Poles
0	0	0

ARCA Menards Series career
- 6 races run over 3 years
- Best finish: 62nd (2000)
- First race: 1999 EasyCare Vehicle Services Contracts 100 (Charlotte)
- Last race: 2001 EasyCare Vehicle Services Contracts 100 (Charlotte)
Wins	Top tens	Poles
0	1	0
- Statistics up to date as of December 26, 2024.

J. R. Robbs (born January 1, 1979) is an American former professional stock car racing driver who has competed in the NASCAR Busch Series and the ARCA Re/Max Series.

Robbs has also previously competed in the NASCAR Goody's Dash Series, the ARA Late Model Stock All-Star Tour, and the UARA STARS Late Model Series.

== Motorsports results ==
=== NASCAR ===
(key) (Bold - Pole position awarded by qualifying time. Italics - Pole position earned by points standings or practice time. * – Most laps led.)

==== Busch Series ====
NASCAR Busch Series results
Year	Team	No.	Make	1	2	3	4	5	6	7	8	9	10	11	12	13	14	15	16	17	18	19	20	21	22	23	24	25	26	27	28	29	30	31	32	33	34	NBSC	Pts	Ref
2001	Big Fan Racing	89	Chevy	DAY	CAR	LVS	ATL	DAR	BRI	TEX	NSH	TAL	CAL	RCH	NHA	NZH	CLT	DOV	KEN	MLW	GLN	CHI	GTY	PPR	IRP	MCH	BRI	DAR	RCH	DOV	KAN	CLT; DNQ	MEM	PHO	CAR	HOM		N/A	0	
2003	Davis Motorsports	0	Chevy	DAY	CAR	LVS	DAR	BRI	TEX	TAL	NSH	CAL	RCH	GTY; 27	NZH; 36	CLT	DOV; 37	NSH	KEN	MLW	DAY	CHI	NHA	PPR	IRP	MCH	BRI	DAR	RCH	DOV	KAN	CLT	MEM	ATL	PHO	CAR	HOM	94th	189	

==== Goody's Dash Series ====
NASCAR Goody's Dash Series results
Year	Team	No.	Make	1	2	3	4	5	6	7	8	9	10	11	12	13	14	15	16	NGDS	Pts	Ref
1999	N/A	59	Pontiac	DAY	HCY	CAR	CLT	BRI	LOU	SUM	GRE; 13	ROU	STA	MYB	HCY	LAN	USA	JAC	LAN	N/A	0	
2002	N/A	06	Pontiac	DAY	HAR	ROU	LON	CLT; 28	KEN	MEM	GRE	SNM	SBO	MYB						53rd	182	
2002	N/A	59	Pontiac												BRI; 20	MOT	ATL			53rd	182	

=== ARCA Re/Max Series ===
(key) (Bold – Pole position awarded by qualifying time. Italics – Pole position earned by points standings or practice time. * – Most laps led. ** – All laps led.)

ARCA Re/Max Series results
Year	Team	No.	Make	1	2	3	4	5	6	7	8	9	10	11	12	13	14	15	16	17	18	19	20	21	22	23	24	25	ARMSC	Pts	Ref
1999	N/A	31	Chevy	DAY	ATL	SLM	AND	CLT	MCH	POC	TOL	SBS	BLN	POC	KIL	FRS	FLM	ISF	WIN	DSF	SLM	CLT; 17	TAL	ATL					107th	145	
2000	Kenneth Appling	9	Chevy	DAY	SLM	AND	CLT; DNQ																						62nd	360	
2000	Kenneth Appling	10	Chevy				CLT; 10	KIL	FRS	MCH	POC	TOL	KEN	BLN															62nd	360	
2000	Kenneth Appling	3	Chevy												POC; 20	WIN	ISF	KEN	DSF	SLM	CLT; DNQ	TAL; 40	ATL						62nd	360	
2001	Kenneth Appling	3	Chevy	DAY; 29	NSH	WIN	SLM	GTY	KEN																				98th	285	
2001	Roulo Brothers Racing	39	Pontiac							CLT; 33	KAN	MCH	POC	MEM	GLN	KEN	MCH	POC	NSH	ISF	CHI	DSF	SLM	TOL	BLN	CLT; DNQ	TAL	ATL	98th	285	
2001	N/A	45	Pontiac																							CLT; 19			98th	285	
