= 2004 Siemens 300 =

Race details
- Race 19 of 36 in the 2004 NASCAR Nextel Cup Series
- The 2004 Siemens 300 program cover.
- Date: July 25, 2004
- Official name: 12th Annual Siemens 300
- Location: Loudon, New Hampshire, New Hampshire International Raceway
- Course: Permanent racing facility
- Course length: 1.058 miles (1.703 km)
- Distance: 300 laps, 317.4 mi (510.805 km)
- Scheduled distance: 300 laps, 317.4 mi (510.805 km)
- Average speed: 97.862 miles per hour (157.494 km/h)
- Attendance: 99,000

Pole position
Driver	Ryan Newman	Penske-Jasper Racing
- Time: 28.776

Most laps led
Driver	Ryan Newman	Penske-Jasper Racing
- Laps: 187

Winner
No. 97	Kurt Busch	Roush Racing

Television in the United States
- Network: TNT
- Announcers: Allen Bestwick, Benny Parsons, Wally Dallenbach Jr.

Radio in the United States
- Radio: Motor Racing Network

The 2004 Siemens 300 was the 19th stock car race of the 2004 NASCAR Nextel Cup Series season and the 12th iteration of the event. The race was held on Sunday, July 25, 2004, before a crowd of 99,000 in Loudon, New Hampshire, at New Hampshire International Raceway, a 1.058 miles (1.703 km) permanent, oval-shaped, low-banked racetrack. The race took the scheduled 300 laps to complete. At race's end, Kurt Busch of Roush Racing would hold off the field on the final restart, defeating a dominant Ryan Newman with three to go to take his 10th career NASCAR Nextel Cup Series win and his second of the season. To fill out the podium, Jeff Gordon of Hendrick Motorsports finished 2nd and Ryan Newman of Penske-Jasper Racing finished 3rd.

== Background ==
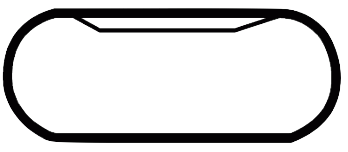
The layout of New Hampshire International Raceway, the venue where the race was held.

New Hampshire International Speedway is a 1.058-mile (1.703 km) oval speedway located in Loudon, New Hampshire which has hosted NASCAR racing annually since the early 1990s, as well as an IndyCar weekend and the oldest motorcycle race in North America, the Loudon Classic. Nicknamed "The Magic Mile", the speedway is often converted into a 1.6-mile (2.6 km) road course, which includes much of the oval. The track was originally the site of Bryar Motorsports Park before being purchased and redeveloped by Bob Bahre. The track is currently one of eight major NASCAR tracks owned and operated by Speedway Motorsports.

=== Entry list ===
#	Driver	Team	Make
0	Ward Burton	Haas CNC Racing	Chevrolet
00	Ryan McGlynn*	McGlynn Racing	Chevrolet
01	Joe Nemechek	MBV Motorsports	Chevrolet
2	Rusty Wallace	Penske-Jasper Racing	Dodge
02	Hermie Sadler	SCORE Motorsports	Chevrolet
4	Jimmy Spencer	Morgan–McClure Motorsports	Chevrolet
5	Terry Labonte	Hendrick Motorsports	Chevrolet
6	Mark Martin	Roush Racing	Ford
8	Dale Earnhardt Jr.**	Dale Earnhardt, Inc.	Chevrolet
9	Kasey Kahne	Evernham Motorsports	Dodge
09	Bobby Hamilton Jr.	Phoenix Racing	Dodge
10	Scott Riggs	MBV Motorsports	Chevrolet
12	Ryan Newman	Penske-Jasper Racing	Dodge
15	Michael Waltrip	Dale Earnhardt, Inc.	Chevrolet
16	Greg Biffle	Roush Racing	Ford
17	Matt Kenseth	Roush Racing	Ford
18	Bobby Labonte	Joe Gibbs Racing	Chevrolet
19	Jeremy Mayfield	Evernham Motorsports	Dodge
20	Tony Stewart	Joe Gibbs Racing	Chevrolet
21	Ricky Rudd	Wood Brothers Racing	Ford
22	Scott Wimmer	Bill Davis Racing	Dodge
24	Jeff Gordon	Hendrick Motorsports	Chevrolet
25	Brian Vickers	Hendrick Motorsports	Chevrolet
29	Kevin Harvick	Richard Childress Racing	Chevrolet
30	Johnny Sauter	Richard Childress Racing	Chevrolet
31	Robby Gordon	Richard Childress Racing	Chevrolet
32	Ricky Craven	PPI Motorsports	Chevrolet
38	Elliott Sadler	Robert Yates Racing	Ford
40	Sterling Marlin	Chip Ganassi Racing	Dodge
41	Casey Mears	Chip Ganassi Racing	Dodge
42	Jamie McMurray	Chip Ganassi Racing	Dodge
43	Jeff Green	Petty Enterprises	Dodge
45	Kyle Petty	Petty Enterprises	Dodge
46	Carl Long	Glenn Racing	Dodge
48	Jimmie Johnson	Hendrick Motorsports	Chevrolet
49	Ken Schrader	BAM Racing	Dodge
50	Mike Wallace	Arnold Motorsports	Dodge
51	Kevin Lepage	Competitive Edge Motorsports	Chevrolet
72	Ted Christopher	Kirk Shelmerdine Racing	Ford
77	Brendan Gaughan	Penske-Jasper Racing	Dodge
84	Kyle Busch	Hendrick Motorsports	Chevrolet
88	Dale Jarrett	Robert Yates Racing	Ford
89	Morgan Shepherd	Shepherd Racing Ventures	Dodge
97	Kurt Busch	Roush Racing	Ford
98	Todd Bodine	Mach 1 Motorsports	Ford
99	Jeff Burton	Roush Racing	Ford
Official entry list

*Withdrew due to not fitting inspection templates numerous times.

**While he had started the race, he would have to be relieved by Martin Truex Jr. for practice sessions and qualifying, as Earnhardt Jr. was recovering from burns suffered from a sports car race. However, as Earnhardt Jr. did start the race, he was credited with the finish.

== Practice ==
=== First practice ===
The first practice session would occur on Friday, July 23, at 11:20 AM EST and would last for two hours. Ryan Newman of Penske-Jasper Racing would set the fastest time in the session, with a lap of 28.678 and an average speed of 132.813 miles per hour (213.742 km/h).

Pos.	#	Driver	Team	Make	Time	Speed
1	12	Ryan Newman	Penske-Jasper Racing	Dodge	28.678	132.813
2	8	Martin Truex Jr.	Dale Earnhardt, Inc.	Chevrolet	28.834	132.094
3	9	Kasey Kahne	Evernham Motorsports	Dodge	28.906	131.765
Full first practice results

=== Second practice ===
The second practice session would occur on Saturday, July 24, at 9:30 AM EST and would last for 45 minutes. Greg Biffle of Roush Racing would set the fastest time in the session, with a lap of 29.209 and an average speed of 130.398 miles per hour (209.855 km/h).

Pos.	#	Driver	Team	Make	Time	Speed
1	16	Greg Biffle	Roush Racing	Ford	29.209	130.398
2	24	Jeff Gordon	Hendrick Motorsports	Chevrolet	29.211	130.389
3	12	Ryan Newman	Penske-Jasper Racing	Dodge	29.255	130.193
Full second practice results

=== Third and final practice ===
The third and final practice session, sometimes referred to as Happy Hour, would occur on Saturday, July 24, at 11:10 AM EST and would last for 45 minutes. Ryan Newman of Penske-Jasper Racing would set the fastest time in the session, with a lap of 29.249 and an average speed of 130.220 miles per hour (209.569 km/h).

Pos.	#	Driver	Team	Make	Time	Speed
1	12	Ryan Newman	Penske-Jasper Racing	Dodge	29.249	130.220
2	97	Kurt Busch	Roush Racing	Ford	29.277	130.095
3	09	Bobby Hamilton Jr.	Phoenix Racing	Dodge	29.288	130.046
Full Happy Hour practice results

== Qualifying ==
Qualifying would occur on Friday, July 23, at 3:05 PM EST. Each driver would have two laps to set a fastest time; the fastest of the two would count as their official qualifying lap. Positions 1-38 would be decided on time, while positions 39-43 would be based on provisionals. Four spots are awarded by the use of provisionals based on owner's points. The fifth is awarded to a past champion who has not otherwise qualified for the race. If no past champ needs the provisional, the next team in the owner points will be awarded a provisional.

Ryan Newman of Penske-Jasper Racing would win the pole, setting a time of 28.776 and an average speed of 132.360 miles per hour (213.013 km/h).

Kyle Busch, driving a part-time schedule for Hendrick Motorsports, would crash in turn 4 on his warm-up lap. Since the No. 84 did not have enough owner's points for a provision, Busch would miss the race.

Two drivers would fail to qualify: Kevin Lepage and Kyle Busch. In addition, Ryan McGlynn, who had taken part in some of the weekend's practice sessions, also withdrew for unknown reasons.

=== Full qualifying results ===
Pos.	#	Driver	Team	Make	Time	Speed
1	12	Ryan Newman	Penske-Jasper Racing	Dodge	28.776	132.360
2	48	Jimmie Johnson	Hendrick Motorsports	Chevrolet	28.858	131.984
3	8	Dale Earnhardt Jr.	Dale Earnhardt, Inc.	Chevrolet	28.929	131.660
4	15	Michael Waltrip	Dale Earnhardt, Inc.	Chevrolet	28.967	131.488
5	42	Jamie McMurray	Chip Ganassi Racing	Dodge	28.977	131.442
6	9	Kasey Kahne	Evernham Motorsports	Dodge	28.984	131.410
7	19	Jeremy Mayfield	Evernham Motorsports	Dodge	29.031	131.198
8	2	Rusty Wallace	Penske-Jasper Racing	Dodge	29.051	131.107
9	20	Tony Stewart	Joe Gibbs Racing	Chevrolet	29.062	131.058
10	32	Ricky Craven	PPI Motorsports	Chevrolet	29.079	130.981
11	5	Terry Labonte	Hendrick Motorsports	Chevrolet	29.087	130.945
12	0	Ward Burton	Haas CNC Racing	Chevrolet	29.112	130.833
13	38	Elliott Sadler	Robert Yates Racing	Ford	29.121	130.792
14	30	Dave Blaney	Richard Childress Racing	Chevrolet	29.147	130.676
15	10	Scott Riggs	MBV Motorsports	Chevrolet	29.151	130.658
16	16	Greg Biffle	Roush Racing	Ford	29.190	130.483
17	49	Ken Schrader	BAM Racing	Dodge	29.205	130.416
18	01	Joe Nemechek	MBV Motorsports	Chevrolet	29.236	130.278
19	29	Kevin Harvick	Richard Childress Racing	Chevrolet	29.250	130.215
20	18	Bobby Labonte	Joe Gibbs Racing	Chevrolet	29.263	130.158
21	31	Robby Gordon	Richard Childress Racing	Chevrolet	29.275	130.104
22	41	Casey Mears	Chip Ganassi Racing	Dodge	29.296	130.011
23	25	Brian Vickers	Hendrick Motorsports	Chevrolet	29.300	129.993
24	24	Jeff Gordon	Hendrick Motorsports	Chevrolet	29.330	129.860
25	88	Dale Jarrett	Robert Yates Racing	Ford	29.354	129.754
26	6	Mark Martin	Roush Racing	Ford	29.358	129.736
27	99	Jeff Burton	Roush Racing	Ford	29.385	129.617
28	09	Bobby Hamilton Jr.	Phoenix Racing	Dodge	29.387	129.608
29	77	Brendan Gaughan	Penske-Jasper Racing	Dodge	29.461	129.283
30	43	Jeff Green	Petty Enterprises	Dodge	29.475	129.221
31	17	Matt Kenseth	Roush Racing	Ford	29.481	129.195
32	97	Kurt Busch	Roush Racing	Ford	29.503	129.099
33	46	Carl Long	Glenn Racing	Dodge	29.513	129.055
34	21	Ricky Rudd	Wood Brothers Racing	Ford	29.530	128.981
35	4	Jimmy Spencer	Morgan–McClure Motorsports	Chevrolet	29.599	128.680
36	50	Mike Wallace	Arnold Motorsports	Dodge	29.622	128.580
37	40	Sterling Marlin	Chip Ganassi Racing	Dodge	29.646	128.476
38	22	Scott Wimmer	Bill Davis Racing	Dodge	29.653	128.446
Provisionals
39	45	Kyle Petty	Petty Enterprises	Dodge	29.736	128.087
40	98	Todd Bodine	Mach 1 Motorsports	Ford	30.369	125.417
41	89	Morgan Shepherd	Shepherd Racing Ventures	Dodge	30.089	126.585
42	72	Ted Christopher	Kirk Shelmerdine Racing	Ford	29.872	127.504
43	02	Hermie Sadler	SCORE Motorsports	Chevrolet	30.129	126.416
Failed to qualify or withdrew
44	51	Kevin Lepage	Competitive Edge Motorsports	Chevrolet	30.193	126.148
45	84	Kyle Busch	Hendrick Motorsports	Chevrolet	—	—
WD	00	Ryan McGlynn	McGlynn Racing	Chevrolet	—	—
Official qualifying results

== Race results ==
Fin	St	#	Driver	Team	Make	Laps	Led	Status	Pts	Winnings
1	32	97	Kurt Busch	Roush Racing	Ford	300	110	running	185	$227,225
2	24	24	Jeff Gordon	Hendrick Motorsports	Chevrolet	300	0	running	170	$170,458
3	1	12	Ryan Newman	Penske-Jasper Racing	Dodge	300	187	running	175	$160,997
4	31	17	Matt Kenseth	Roush Racing	Ford	300	0	running	160	$146,103
5	9	20	Tony Stewart	Joe Gibbs Racing	Chevrolet	300	0	running	155	$126,178
6	4	15	Michael Waltrip	Dale Earnhardt, Inc.	Chevrolet	300	0	running	150	$110,481
7	5	42	Jamie McMurray	Chip Ganassi Racing	Dodge	300	0	running	146	$84,600
8	6	9	Kasey Kahne	Evernham Motorsports	Dodge	300	0	running	142	$106,075
9	25	88	Dale Jarrett	Robert Yates Racing	Ford	300	0	running	138	$103,317
10	7	19	Jeremy Mayfield	Evernham Motorsports	Dodge	300	0	running	134	$98,500
11	2	48	Jimmie Johnson	Hendrick Motorsports	Chevrolet	300	0	running	130	$89,700
12	27	99	Jeff Burton	Roush Racing	Ford	300	0	running	127	$103,917
13	19	29	Kevin Harvick	Richard Childress Racing	Chevrolet	300	0	running	124	$106,203
14	26	6	Mark Martin	Roush Racing	Ford	300	0	running	121	$76,800
15	13	38	Elliott Sadler	Robert Yates Racing	Ford	300	0	running	118	$104,008
16	11	5	Terry Labonte	Hendrick Motorsports	Chevrolet	300	0	running	115	$94,625
17	20	18	Bobby Labonte	Joe Gibbs Racing	Chevrolet	300	0	running	112	$107,933
18	38	22	Scott Wimmer	Bill Davis Racing	Dodge	300	0	running	109	$89,050
19	28	09	Bobby Hamilton Jr.	Phoenix Racing	Dodge	300	0	running	106	$65,750
20	18	01	Joe Nemechek	MBV Motorsports	Chevrolet	300	0	running	103	$88,400
21	37	40	Sterling Marlin	Chip Ganassi Racing	Dodge	300	0	running	100	$98,125
22	29	77	Brendan Gaughan	Penske-Jasper Racing	Dodge	300	0	running	97	$72,800
23	35	4	Jimmy Spencer	Morgan–McClure Motorsports	Chevrolet	300	3	running	99	$65,425
24	30	43	Jeff Green	Petty Enterprises	Dodge	300	0	running	91	$90,450
25	21	31	Robby Gordon	Richard Childress Racing	Chevrolet	300	0	running	88	$96,372
26	22	41	Casey Mears	Chip Ganassi Racing	Dodge	300	0	running	85	$74,175
27	39	45	Kyle Petty	Petty Enterprises	Dodge	300	0	running	82	$71,739
28	15	10	Scott Riggs	MBV Motorsports	Chevrolet	300	0	running	79	$88,362
29	12	0	Ward Burton	Haas CNC Racing	Chevrolet	300	0	running	76	$62,390
30	8	2	Rusty Wallace	Penske-Jasper Racing	Dodge	298	0	running	73	$103,483
31	3	8	Dale Earnhardt Jr.	Dale Earnhardt, Inc.	Chevrolet	298	0	running	70	$108,628
32	36	50	Mike Wallace	Arnold Motorsports	Dodge	298	0	running	67	$59,230
33	14	30	Dave Blaney	Richard Childress Racing	Chevrolet	295	0	running	64	$67,960
34	23	25	Brian Vickers	Hendrick Motorsports	Chevrolet	293	0	running	61	$66,800
35	16	16	Greg Biffle	Roush Racing	Ford	270	0	crash	58	$66,600
36	42	72	Ted Christopher	Kirk Shelmerdine Racing	Ford	260	0	engine	55	$58,410
37	17	49	Ken Schrader	BAM Racing	Dodge	221	0	engine	52	$58,250
38	10	32	Ricky Craven	PPI Motorsports	Chevrolet	213	0	crash	49	$66,100
39	34	21	Ricky Rudd	Wood Brothers Racing	Ford	208	0	crash	46	$84,091
40	41	89	Morgan Shepherd	Shepherd Racing Ventures	Dodge	192	0	ignition	43	$57,950
41	40	98	Todd Bodine	Mach 1 Motorsports	Ford	153	0	engine	40	$57,900
42	33	46	Carl Long	Glenn Racing	Dodge	100	0	transmission	37	$57,800
43	43	02	Hermie Sadler	SCORE Motorsports	Chevrolet	87	0	overheating	34	$57,959
Official race results

Previous race: 2004 Tropicana 400	NASCAR Nextel Cup Series; 2004 season	Next race: 2004 Pennsylvania 500
