= Braun Motorsports =

Former NASCAR team

- Owner: Todd Braun
- Base: Mooresville, North Carolina
- Series: Camping World Truck Series; ARCA Racing Series
- Race drivers: Camping World Truck Series: 32. Justin Marks, Justin Haley (part-time); ARCA Racing Series: 74. Justin Haley (part-time)
- Manufacturer: Toyota
- Opened: 2001
- Closed: 2010 (reopened 2014)

Career
- Debut: Sprint Cup Series: 2005 Golden Corral 500 (Atlanta); Nationwide Series: 2003 Koolerz 300 (Daytona); Camping World Truck Series: 2015 UNOH 200 (Bristol); ARCA Racing Series:
- Latest race: Sprint Cup Series: 2010 Air Guard 400 (Richmond); Nationwide Series: 2010 Ford 300 (Homestead); Camping World Truck Series: 2015 Lucas Oil 150 (Phoenix); ARCA Racing Series: 2016 ARCA 200 at Lucas Oil Raceway
- Races competed: Total: 561; Sprint Cup Series: 8 Nationwide Series: 516; Camping World Truck Series: 7 ARCA Racing Series: 34
- Drivers' Championships: Total: 0 Sprint Cup Series: 0 Nationwide Series: 0 Camping World Truck Series: 0 ARCA Racing Series: 0
- Race victories: Total: 8 Sprint Cup Series: 0 Nationwide Series: 4 Camping World Truck Series: 0 ARCA Racing Series: 4
- Pole positions: Total: 18; Sprint Cup Series: 0 Nationwide Series: 13; Camping World Truck Series: 0 ARCA Racing Series: 5

Braun Motorsports, formerly known as Braun Racing, was an American professional stock car racing team that last competed in the NASCAR Camping World Truck Series. The team is based in Mooresville, North Carolina. Best known as one of the top independent Xfinity Series teams from 2003 to 2010, the team also made several starts in the Sprint Cup Series. The team was owned by Todd Braun, son of Braun Corporation founder Ralph Braun. The team formerly had alliances with Chip Ganassi Racing and Dale Earnhardt, Inc., and the team's operations also included former entries from ppc Racing and Akins Motorsports.

In late 2010, the team was sold to Texas businessman and Camping World Truck Series team owner Steve Turner, becoming Turner Motorsports and later Turner Scott Motorsports (TSM). TSM ceased operations in 2014.

After fielding entries in the regional K&N Pro Series East in 2014, the team returned to national competition in 2015 in the Camping World Truck Series with longtime sponsor Great Clips. The team most recently fielded the No. 32 Katerra Toyota Tundra part-time for Justin Marks, and Justin Haley.

== Sprint Cup Series ==
Shane Hmiel (2005)

Braun Racing briefly fielded a team in the Sprint Cup Series (then the NEXTEL Cup Series) in 2005, when they began fielding the No. 08 WinFuel Chevrolet driven by Busch Series driver Shane Hmiel. It debuted at Atlanta Motor Speedway, but finished 43rd after Hmiel was swept up in a multi-car accident on the first lap. Hmiel raced the car the following week at Bristol Motor Speedway, and finished 40th due to overheating. The team did not run the rest of the year due to Hmiel's suspension from competition.

Jason Leffler (2006)

Braun attempted another Cup race in 2006 at the fall Phoenix race with Jason Leffler driving a number 71 car and sponsorship from Ft. McDowell Resort Destination. Leffler, however, failed to qualify for the event.

Reed Sorenson (2010)

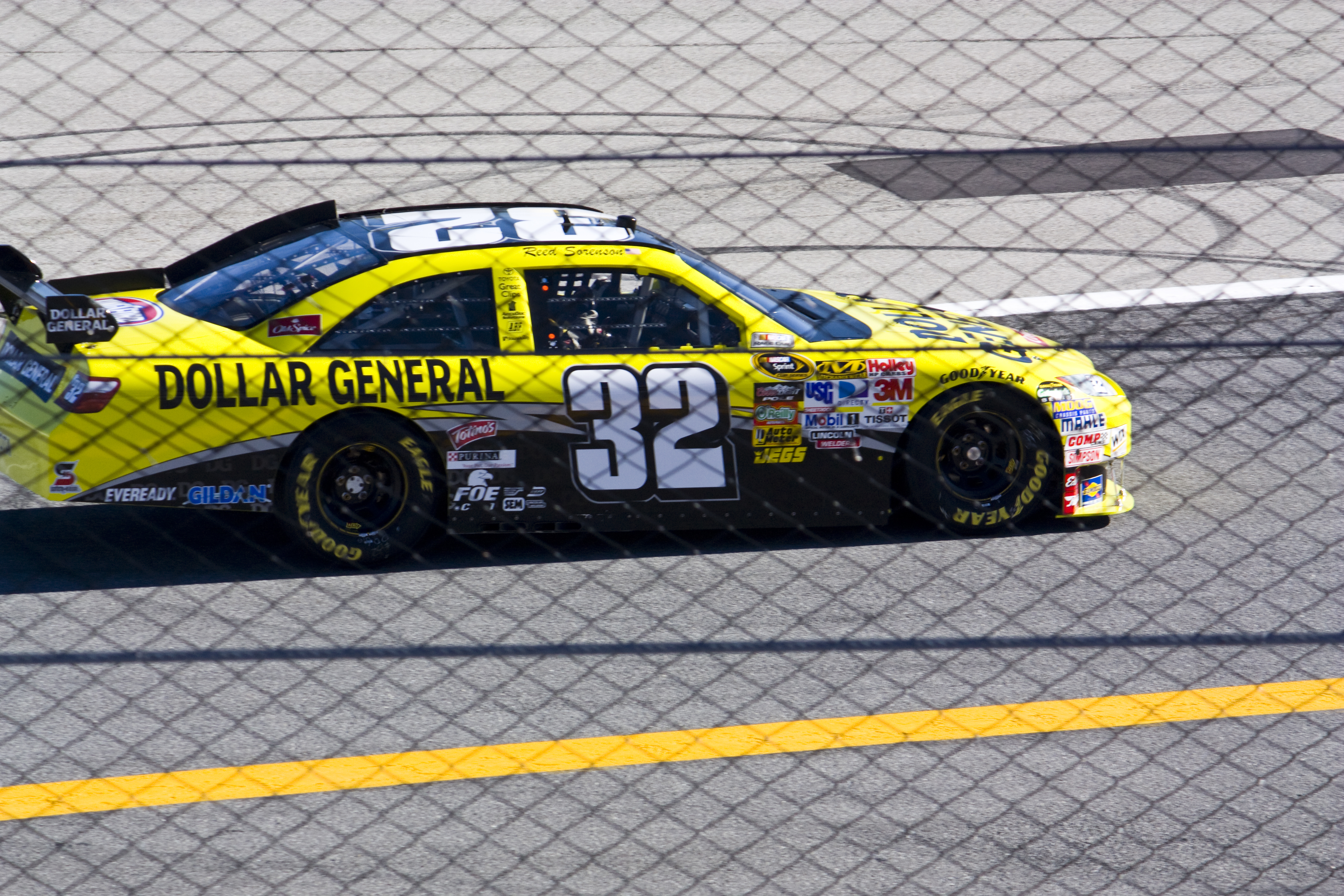
Reed Sorenson in the No. 32 at Daytona International Speedway in 2010.

The team announced plans to field a Sprint Cup team for at least five races in 2010. Reed Sorenson drove the No. 32 Toyota Camry in those five races with Dollar General as the sponsor. The team also attempted a few races with no sponsor as a start and park. Leffler, Mike Bliss, and Jacques Villeneuve also attempted a few races. When Turner Motorsports announced their purchase of Braun Racing, they also announced that the Sprint Cup team had been shut down.

=== Car No. 32 results ===
NASCAR Sprint Cup Series results
Year	Driver	No.	Make	1	2	3	4	5	6	7	8	9	10	11	12	13	14	15	16	17	18	19	20	21	22	23	24	25	26	27	28	29	30	31	32	33	34	35	36	Owners	Pts
2005	Shane Hmiel	08	Chevy	DAY	CAL	LVS	ATL; 43	BRI; 40	MAR	TEX	PHO	TAL	DAR; Wth	RCH	CLT	DOV	POC	MCH	SON	DAY	CHI	NHA	POC	IND	GLN	MCH	BRI	CAL	RCH	NHA	DOV	TAL	KAN	CLT	MAR	ATL	TEX	PHO	HOM	68th	77
2006	Jason Leffler	71	Chevy	DAY	CAL	LVS	ATL	BRI	MAR	TEX	PHO	TAL	RCH	DAR	CLT	DOV	POC	MCH	SON	DAY	CHI	NHA	POC	IND	GLN	MCH	BRI	CAL	RCH	NHA	DOV	KAN	TAL	CLT	MAR	ATL	TEX	PHO; DNQ	HOM	70th	31
2010	Reed Sorenson	32	Toyota	DAY; DNQ	CAL	LVS	ATL	BRI	MAR	PHO	TEX; 39	TAL	RCH; 41	DAR; 43	DOV	CLT; DNQ	POC	MCH	SON	NHA	DAY																			47th	389
2010	Mike Bliss	32	Toyota																			CHI; 41				MCH; DNQ	BRI; DNQ													47th	389
2010	Jacques Villeneuve	32	Toyota																				IND; 29	POC	GLN															47th	389
2010	Jason Leffler	32	Toyota																									ATL; DNQ	RCH; 43	NHA	DOV	KAN	CAL	CLT	MAR	TAL	TEX	PHO	HOM	47th	389

== Nationwide Series ==
=== Car No. 10 history ===
Dave Blaney (2007)

For the 2007 season, the No. 10 team became part of Braun Racing through an alliance with ppc Racing, which had fielded the 10 car since 2000. ppc driver John Andretti ran the Daytona season opener with 2006 sponsor Camping World. Initially announced to drive the full season, Andretti left after Daytona When funding for the team became questionable as Braun took full control over the No. 10 entry, with Dave Blaney assuming driving duties. Blaney drove the car until Montreal. British driver John Graham then took over for the next road races, and Brian Vickers took over for four races. However, Vickers ran at Phoenix and Blaney ran at Homestead. Blaney returned for several more races before Brent Sherman was signed for the last four races.

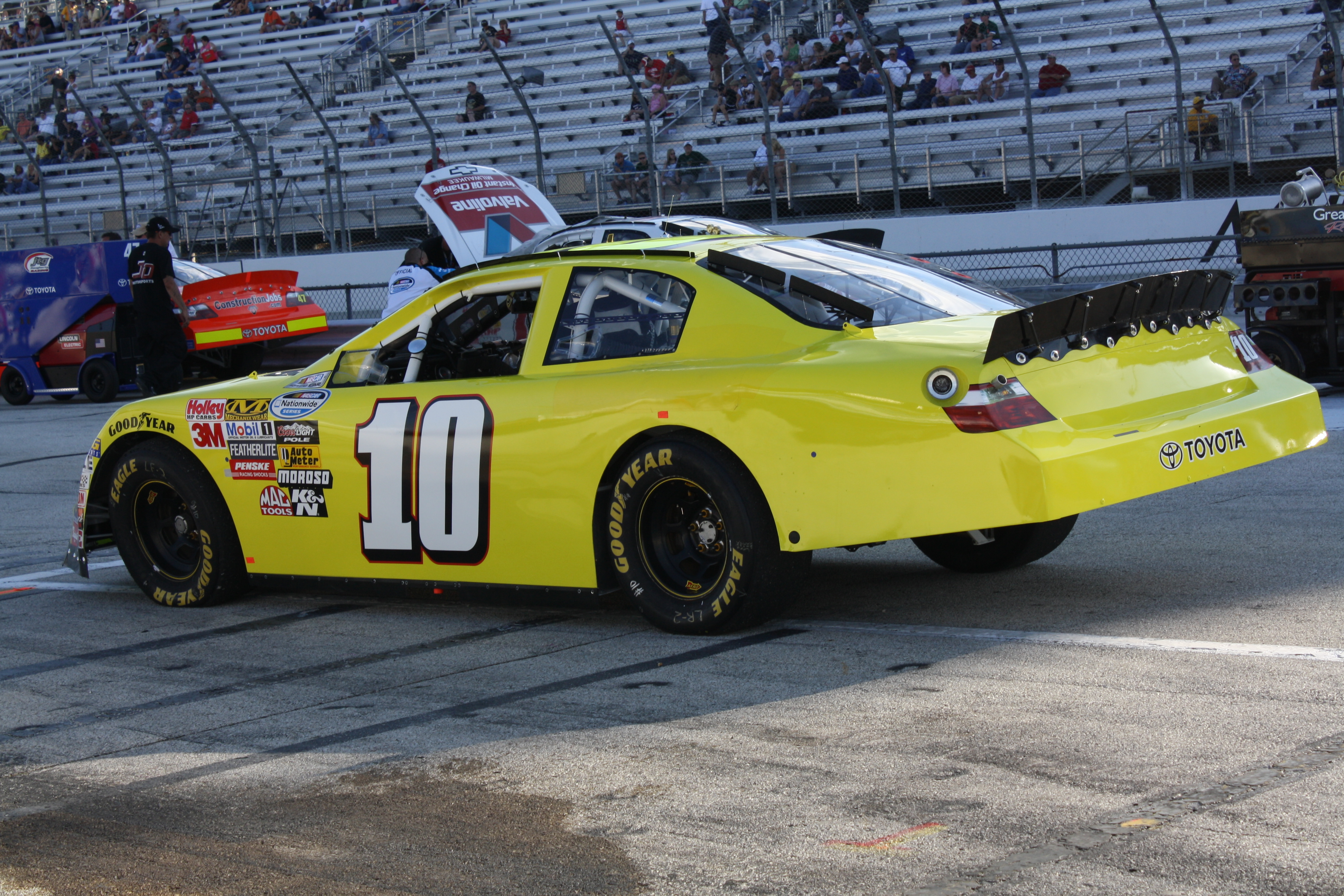
Kelly Bires in 2009

Multiple Drivers (2008-2010)

Brian Vickers drove a part-time schedule for Braun in 2008, with Blaney and Justin Marks driving in one race apiece. The team ran again full-time in 2009 with rotating drivers David Reutimann, Kelly Bires, Brian Scott, Marc Davis, Chad Blount, Justin Marks and Cup drivers Kasey Kahne, Elliott Sadler, and Reed Sorenson under a partnership with Richard Petty Motorsports.

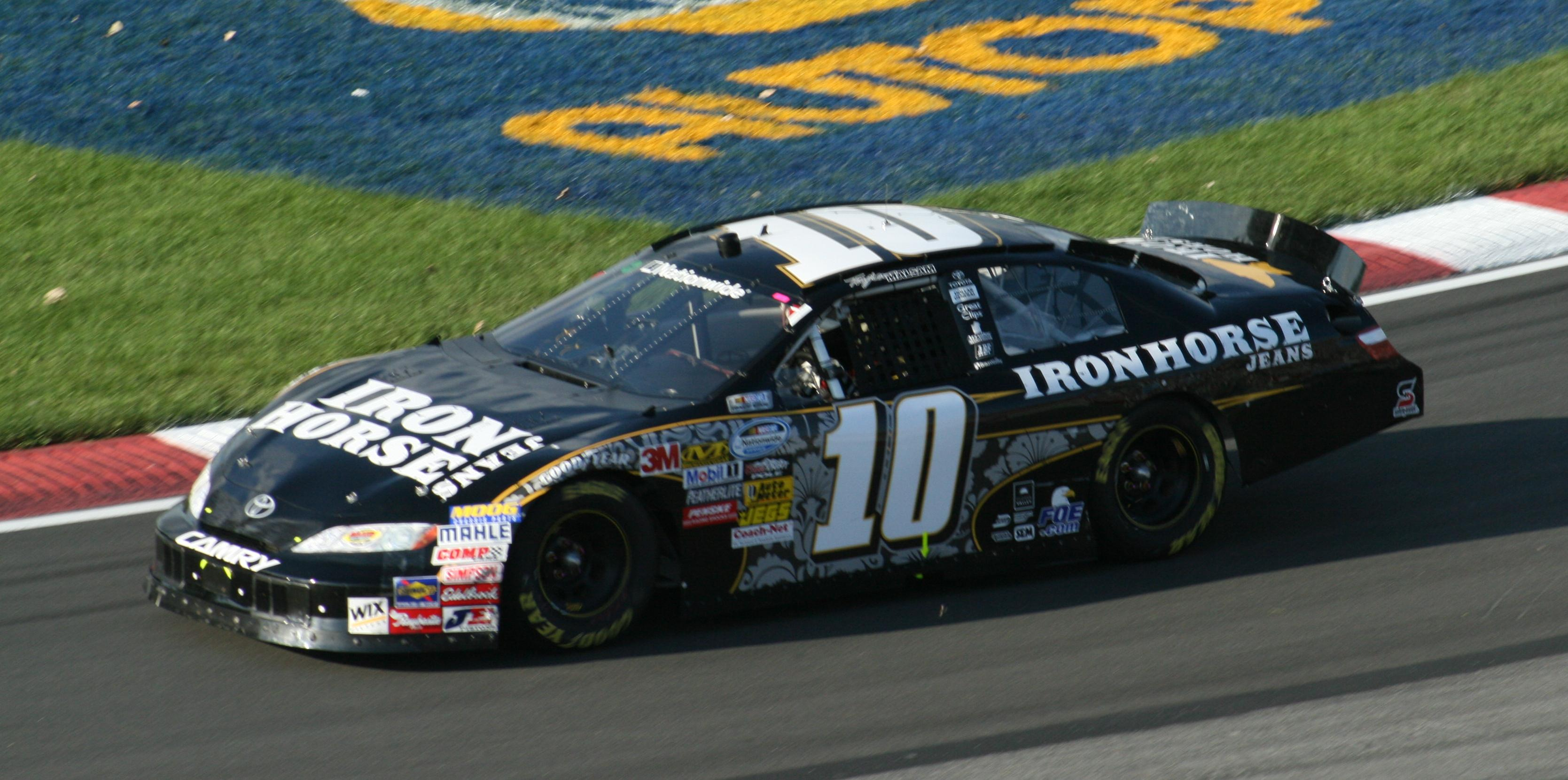
Tayler Malsam in 2010

For 2010, Jason Leffler drove 8 races in the No. 10 when Kasey Kahne was driving the No. 38. Tayler Malsam, who had left Kyle Busch Motorsports in the Truck Series due to lack of sponsorship, began running the car at Nashville with sponsorship from Iron Horse Jeans. Malsam was released from the team following the Turner Motorsports takeover, after 11 starts over 14 races. Other drivers for the team included David Reutimann, Chad Blount, Mikey Kile, Casey Mears, Reed Sorenson and Josh Wise. Turner drivers Ricky Carmichael, James Buescher and Scott Wimmer made starts for the team at the end of the season. This team became the No. 30 for Turner.

=== Car No. 11 history ===
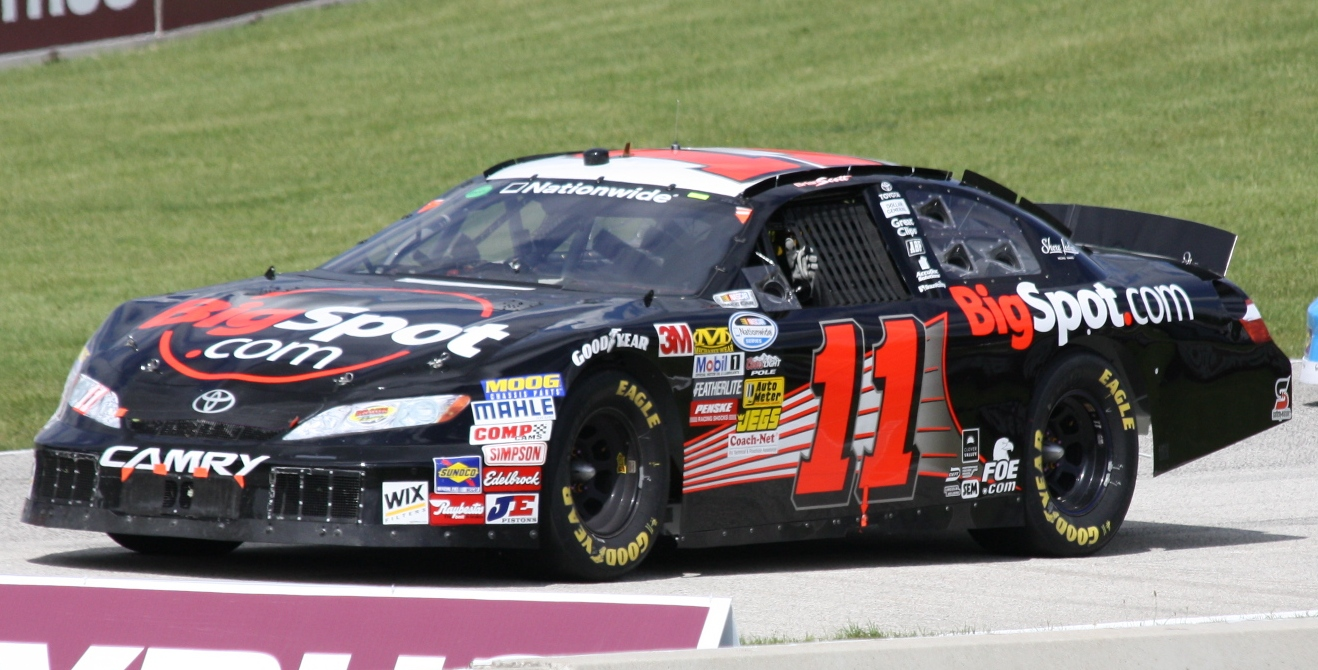
No. 11 in 2010

Brian Scott (2010)

This team debuted in 2010 with rookie Brian Scott running the full season with AccuDuc Solutions, StopRepairBills.com, BigSpot.com, and Scott's family business Shore Lodge sponsoring the car. Scott was leading the Rookie of the Year standings when the team was purchased by Steve Turner, and was released due to his plans to leave the team at the end of the year. Truck Series driver James Buescher drove the No. 11 Great Clips car at Kansas. Buescher finished 35th, seven laps down. David Reutimann also drove a few races with Rexall sponsorship. The team became the No. 31 car for Turner Motorsports; the No. 11 moved to Joe Gibbs Racing's Nationwide Series car, coincidentally driven by Scott.

=== Car No. 32 history ===
Chad Blount (2002-2003)

Braun Racing was formed in 2002 when team owner Todd Braun hired rookie Chad Blount to drive in the ARCA RE/MAX Series. Blount finished second in points, and won Rookie of the Year honors. Braun moved his operation to the Busch Series in 2003, in a technical alliance with Chip Ganassi Racing. Braun fielded the No. 30 Dodge for Jimmy Vasser for two races, and the No. 19 for Chad Blount and Ganassi drivers Casey Mears, David Stremme, and Jamie McMurray. Mears ran the most races for Braun, winning a pole at Chicagoland Speedway and finishing in the top-ten four times in fourteen starts.

David Stremme (2004)

In 2004, McMurray won the team's first race at North Carolina Speedway in the No. 30. The 19 team meanwhile became the No. 32, running full-time with sponsorship from TrimSpa X32 (leading to the number change) and Stremme as the driver. Stremme won a pole at The Milwaukee Mile and five top-fives before moving to FitzBradshaw Racing towards the end of the season. He was replaced by Shane Hmiel.

Shane Hmiel (2004-2005)

Shane Hmiel was named the full-time driver in 2005, and the team switched from Dodge to Chevrolet in an alliance with Dale Earnhardt, Inc. The team also gained sponsorship from WinFuel Multivitamins, owned by TrimSpa's parent company. Hmiel won the pole position at Texas and three top-fives when he was suspended by NASCAR in violation of its drug policy. Jorge Goeters, Ron Hornaday Jr., Blount, and Jason Leffler finished out the year for the team.

Jason Leffler (2005-2006)

After struggling to find primary sponsorship for 2006, Braun merged with Akins Motorsports (then a Dodge team) and hired Jason Leffler as the full-time driver, running as Braun-Akins Racing. After the release of Akins' driver A.J. Foyt IV, Leffler moved in the No. 38 and the No. 32 became a part-time team, running with driver Dave Blaney. Blaney had a few good runs and then pulled off a big victory in the fall event at Lowe's Motor Speedway. Racing side by side with Matt Kenseth during the final laps, going into turn 4, Kenseth lost control of his car and spun out, Blaney raced on to the checker flag for the win.

Part Time (2006-2007)

The team was to continue with Blaney full-time in 2007, running Toyotas with support from Hass Avocados and Fans1st.com, but following John Andretti's departure from the 10 car, Blaney began piloting that car full-time. Michael Waltrip, Bill Elliott, and Brian Vickers drove the No. 32 on a limited basis during the season.

Multiple Drivers (2008-2010)

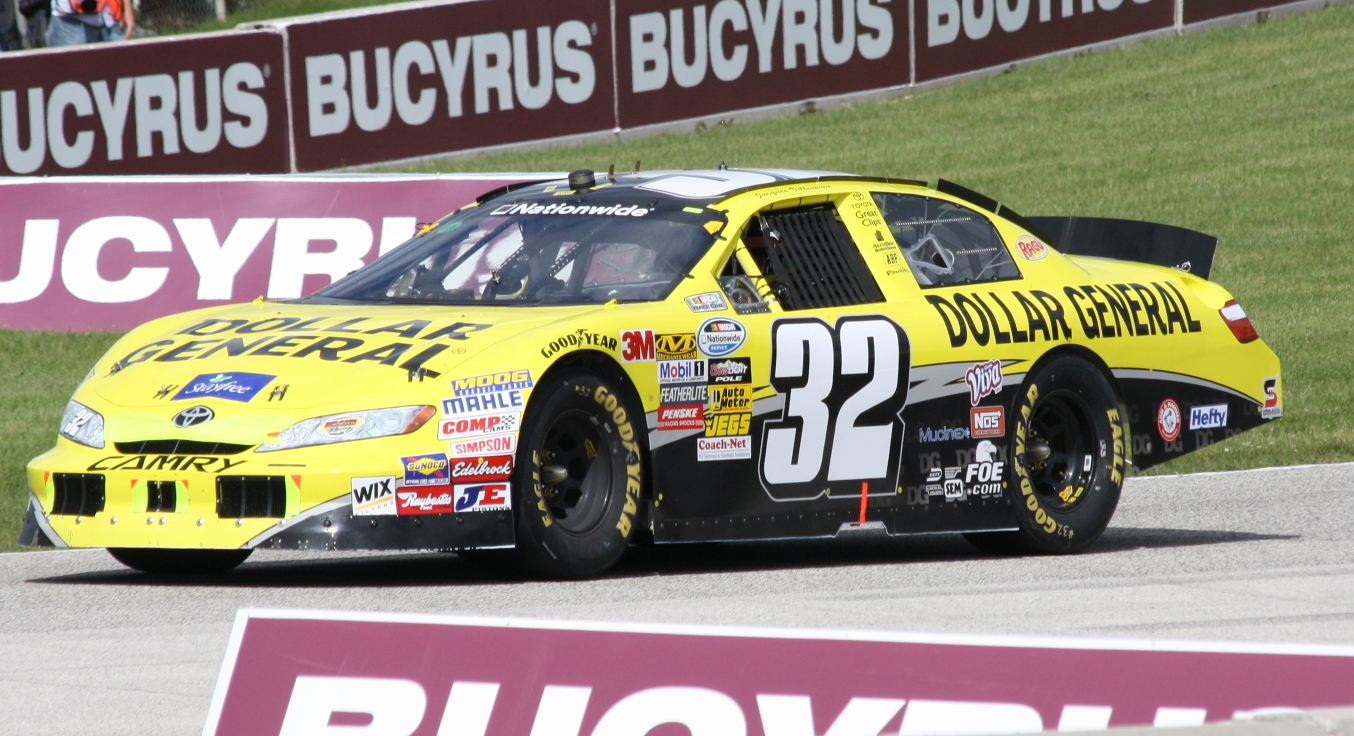
No. 32 in 2010

In 2008 the No. 32 was driven by Denny Hamlin, Kyle Busch, Brian Vickers and James Buescher with sponsorship from Dollar General and Hass Avocados. Michel Jourdain Jr. and Jacques Villeneuve raced on the road courses. The team finished 12th in owner points. Dollar General sponsored the No. 32 full-time in 2009, with Burney Lamar and Brian Vickers driving. Lamar was released midway through the season, and was replaced by Reed Sorenson at Gateway, Villeneuve at Montreal, Reutimann at ORP, Bristol, Dover, and Homestad, and West Series driver Brian Ickler at Iowa and Memphis. Vickers returned in 2010 along with Reed Sorenson, however, in May, Vickers suffered blood clots in his leg, ending his participation in the Nationwide Series and the Sprint Cup Series for 2010.

The team continued as the 32, and later the 42 team for Turner Scott Motorsports and HScott Motorsports with Chip Ganassi.

==== Car No. 32 results ====
NASCAR Nationwide Series results
Year	Driver	No.	Make	1	2	3	4	5	6	7	8	9	10	11	12	13	14	15	16	17	18	19	20	21	22	23	24	25	26	27	28	29	30	31	32	33	34	35	Owners	Pts
2003	Chad Blount	19	Dodge	DAY; 11	CAR; 32	LVS; 29	DAR; 18	BRI; 31	TEX; 5	TAL; 41	NSH; 8	CAL; 33	RCH; 17	GTY; 29	NZH																								25th	2546
2003	Casey Mears	19	Dodge													CLT; 15	DOV; 28	NSH	KEN	MLW	DAY	CHI; 4	NHA	PPR	IRP	MCH; 7	BRI; 41	DAR; 9	RCH; 31	DOV; 28	KAN; 12	CLT; 15	MEM	ATL; 20	PHO; 21	CAR; 21	HOM; 8		25th	2546
2004	David Stremme	32	Dodge	DAY; 6	CAR; 36	LVS; 3	DAR; 5	BRI; 18	TEX; 27		TAL; 40	CAL; 26	GTY; 8		NZH; 5	CLT; 8	DOV; 34	NSH; 35	KEN; 9	MLW; 2	DAY; 28	CHI; 34	NHA; 28	PPR; 7	IRP; 11	MCH; 11	BRI; 6	CAL; 36	RCH; 8	DOV; 16	KAN; 3	CLT; 34	MEM; 7						16th	3626
2004	David Stremme	30	Dodge							NSH; 32				RCH; 35																									16th	3626
2004	Shane Hmiel	32	Dodge																															ATL; 34	PHO; 32	DAR; 22			16th	3626
2004	Shane Hmiel	32	Chevy																																		HOM; 22		16th	3626
2005	Shane Hmiel	32	Chevy	DAY; 39	CAL; 3	MXC; 4	LVS; 36	ATL; 39	NSH; 3	BRI; 12	TEX; 10	PHO; 33	TAL; 43	DAR; 24	RCH; 17	CLT; 43																							13th	3800
2005	Ron Hornaday Jr.	32	Chevy														DOV; 37	NSH; 14		MLW; 15						IRP; 14													13th	3800
2005	Chad Blount	32	Chevy																KEN; 22																				13th	3800
2005	Jason Leffler	32	Chevy																		DAY; 9	CHI; 23	NHA; 29		GTY; 18			MCH; 14	BRI; 20	CAL; 7	RCH; 5	DOV; 3	KAN; 19	CLT; 6	MEM; 24	TEX; 8	PHO; 7	HOM; 27	13th	3800
2005	Jorge Goeters	32	Chevy																					PPR; 24			GLN; 9												13th	3800
2006	Jason Leffler	32	Chevy	DAY; 6	CAL; 22	MXC; 17	LVS; 11	ATL; 6	BRI; 32	TEX; 17	NSH; 35	PHO; 22^{*}	TAL	RCH	DAR																								42nd	1382
2006	Dave Blaney	32	Chevy													CLT; 15	DOV	NSH	KEN	MLW	DAY	CHI; 13	NHA; 15				GLN; 40	MCH	BRI	CAL	RCH; 7	DOV; 16	KAN	CLT; 1	MEM	TEX	PHO	HOM	42nd	1382
2006	Chase Pistone	32	Chevy																					MAR; 37	GTY	IRP													42nd	1382
2007	Dave Blaney	32	Toyota	DAY; 2	CAL	MXC	LVS					PHO; 10	TAL	RCH	DAR																								56th	353
2007	Michael Waltrip	32	Toyota					ATL; 43	BRI	NSH	TEX																												56th	353
2007	Bill Elliott	32	Toyota													CLT; DNQ	DOV	NSH	KEN	MLW	NHA																		56th	353
2007	Brian Vickers	32	Toyota																			DAY; 13	CHI	GTY	IRP	CGV	GLN	MCH	BRI	CAL	RCH	DOV	KAN	CLT	MEM	TEX	PHO	HOM	56th	353
2008	Denny Hamlin	32	Toyota	DAY; 8					NSH; 7				TAL; 37								NHA; 2		CHI; 2				GLN; 34		BRI; 36			DOV; 6				TEX; 14		HOM; 7	12th	4140
2008	Kyle Busch	32	Toyota		CAL; 2			BRI; 42						RCH; 3	DAR; 31	CLT; 1*	DOV; 28	NSH; 20													RCH; 10		KAN; 35				PHO; 5		12th	4140
2008	Brian Vickers	32	Toyota			LVS; 36	ATL; 22			TEX; 6												DAY; 37						MCH; 2		CAL; 3				CLT; 3					12th	4140
2008	James Buescher	32	Toyota								PHO; 18								KEN; 14	MLW; 14				GTY; 7	IRP; 28										MEM; 19				12th	4140
2008	Michel Jourdain Jr.	32	Toyota									MXC; 36																											12th	4140
2008	Jacques Villeneuve	32	Toyota																							CGV; 16													12th	4140
2009	Brian Vickers	32	Toyota	DAY; 6	CAL; 8	LVS; 3					TAL; 20		DAR; 10	CLT; 4	DOV; 4				NHA; 12	DAY; 7	CHI; 3				GLN; 37	MCH; 2*			ATL; 13			KAN; 28	CAL; 2	CLT; 4		TEX; 7			7th	4618
2009	Burney Lamar	32	Toyota				BRI; 15	TEX; 35	NSH; 13	PHO; 13		RCH; 28				NSH; 15	KEN; 8	MLW; 22																					7th	4618
2009	Reed Sorenson	32	Toyota																			GTY; 2															PHO; 3		7th	4618
2009	David Reutimann	32	Toyota																				IRP; 11				BRI; 11			RCH; 5	DOV; 9							HOM; 6	7th	4618
2009	Brian Ickler	32	Toyota																					IOW; 32											MEM; 26				7th	4618
2009	Jacques Villeneuve	32	Toyota																									CGV; 4											7th	4618
2010	Brian Vickers	32	Toyota	DAY; 5	CAL; 8	LVS; 5					TAL; 9		DAR; 9																										6th	4558
2010	Reed Sorenson	32	Toyota				BRI; 7	NSH; 2	PHO; 12	TEX; 3		RCH; 8		DOV; 4	CLT; 8	NSH; 7	KEN; 5		NHA; 8	DAY; 22	CHI; 8	GTY; 2	IRP; 5	IOW; 36		MCH; 8	BRI; 8		ATL; 34	RCH; 5	DOV	KAN	CAL	CLT	GTY	TEX	PHO	HOM	6th	4558
2010	Jacques Villeneuve	32	Toyota															ROA; 25							GLN; 8			CGV; 3											6th	4558

=== Car No. 38 history ===
Jason Leffler (2006-2010)

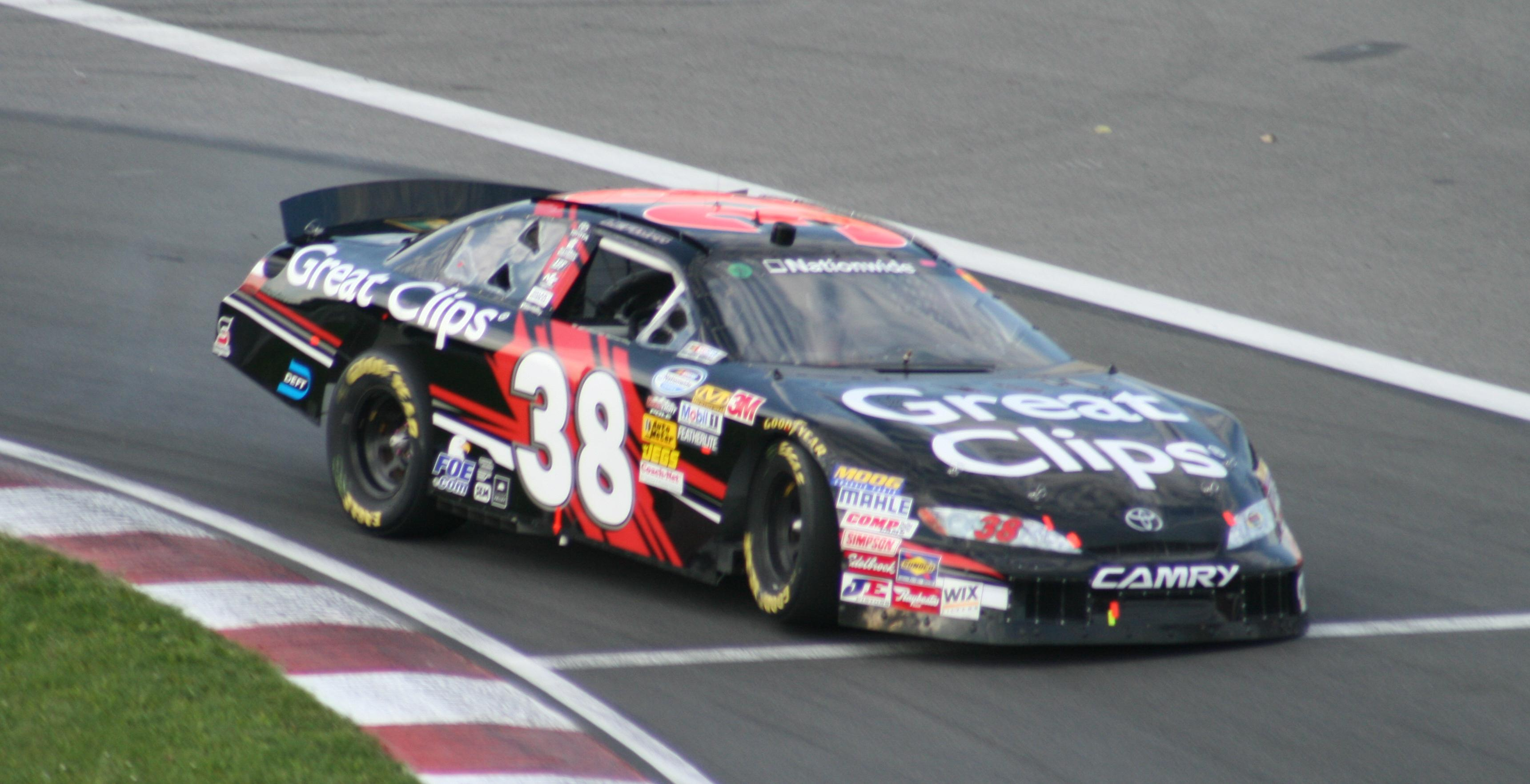
Jason Leffler in 2010.

Akins Motorsports began 2006 with A. J. Foyt IV in the No. 38 Great Clips Dodge competing for Rookie of the Year. Shortly after the season began, Akins Motorsports and Braun Racing merged and the No. 38 switched from Dodge to Chevrolet after seven races. Foyt was then released from the ride because he had a driver development deal with Dodge. After Ryan Moore drove the car at Phoenix, Jason Leffler, who had been driving the Braun 32 car, took over the ride and had an up-and-down year. Leffler was often one of the best non-Cup teams on the track. However, engine woes continually ended his bid to make the top-10 in points.

Running first year manufacturer Toyota in the Busch Series in 2007, Leffler gave Toyota its first Busch Series win on July 28, 2007 by winning at O'Reilly Raceway Park. The win established the No. 38 team as the top non-Cup affiliated team in the Busch Series, finishing third in points.

In 2010, Leffler split the car with Richard Petty Motorsports driver Kasey Kahne, who had driven the 38 Great Clips car for Akins early in his career. Leffler ran the remaining races in the No. 10 car.

== Camping World Truck Series ==
=== Truck No. 32 history ===
In 2015, the re-branded Braun Motorsports made its return to national series competition. K&N Pro Series East driver Justin Haley made his series debut driving the No. 32 Chevrolet Silverado in the UNOH 200 presented by Zloop on August 19 at Bristol Motor Speedway, with two additional races planned. The entry was sponsored by Great Clips, which sponsored the team from 2006 to 2010. Haley finished 14th in his debut at the Bristol race. He then finished dead last at Martinsville after being involved in a single car accident. At Phoenix, Haley qualified third and finished seventh, his best NASCAR finish up to that point.

The team announced in 2016 it would attempt to run at Atlanta with Justin Marks in the No. 32 Toyota Tundra.

==== Truck No. 32 results ====
NASCAR Camping World Truck Series results
Year	Driver	No.	Make	1	2	3	4	5	6	7	8	9	10	11	12	13	14	15	16	17	18	19	20	21	22	23	Owners	Pts
2015	Justin Haley	32	Chevy	DAY	ATL	MAR	KAN	CLT	DOV	TEX	GTW	IOW	KEN	ELD	POC	MCH	BRI; 14	MSP	CHI	NHA	LVS	TAL	MAR; 32	TEX	PHO; 7	HOM	40th	79
2016	Justin Marks	32	Toyota	DAY	ATL; 22																						39th	34
2016	Justin Haley	32	Toyota			MAR; 26	KAN	DOV	CLT	TEX	IOW																39th	34
2016	Justin Haley	32	Chevy									GTW; 21	KEN	ELD	POC	BRI	MCH	MSP; 29	CHI	NHA	LVS	TAL	MAR	TEX	PHO	HOM	39th	34

== K&N Pro Series East ==
In 2014, Todd Braun returned to the sport, fielding a No. 10 Chevrolet for J.J. Haley in three K&N Pro Series East races. Haley scored a seventh-place finish in his third start at Dover. Haley moved to HScott Motorsports in 2015, with Braun Auto Group continuing to sponsor Haley's entries. In 2016, Haley won the NASCAR K&N Pro Series East championship with a record average finish of 3.4.

== See also ==
- Braun Corporation
- BraunAbility
- HScott Motorsports – a successor team, owned by former Braun minority owner and sponsor Harry Scott Jr.
- Turner Scott Motorsports
