= BraunAbility =

American wheelchair-lift manufacturer

BraunAbility is an American manufacturer of wheelchair accessible vans and wheelchair lifts based in Winamac, Indiana. It is currently owned by Investor AB. The company was founded by Ralph Braun, who had spinal muscular atrophy. Braun designed a wheelchair lift and steering controls, which allowed him to drive a 1970 converted full size Dodge van. He began converting vans to sell to others. As sales grew, Braun was able to acquire Independent Mobility Systems. IMS had previously been the largest manufacturer of wheelchair minivans. Braun also acquired the Viewpoint Mobility line of wheelchair minivans, Ability Center, United Access, Performance Mobility, Kersey Mobility, ADA and Wheel Chair Vans of Florida. Company sales have grown to $1,090 million a year in 2023.

== History ==
1963: Braun builds his first three-wheel motorized scooter in his cousin's farm shop. He later named this scooter the "Tri-Wheeler".

1963: Braun begins selling the Tri-Wheeler to others out of his parents' garage under the name Save-A-Step Manufacturing Company.

1966: Ralph's employer relocates further from his home making it impractical to ride his Tri-Wheeler to work. He equips old Post Office Jeep with a hydraulic tailgate lift and homemade hand controls.

1969: Save-A-Step outgrows the Braun's garage and moves to the John Deere/Singer building in downtown Winamac.

1970: Chrysler introduces the full-sze van. Braun builds the precursor to the Lift-A-Way Wheelchair Lift to fit this revolutionary vehicle.

1972: Save-A-Step Manufacturing Company incorporates as The Braun Corporation with five employees.

1974: Braun expands the main production building and additional buildings are constructed to meet the growing demand of lifts and Tri-Wheelers.

1976: A fiberglass operation is purchased to build Tri-Wheeler covers. Portable restrooms and roll-in wheelchair-accessible shower stalls would soon be added to the production line.

1977: The Clearwater, Florida division is established.

1978: The Huntington Beach, CA division is established.

1979: A devastating fire sweeps through the Braun Corporate Headquarters. The aftermath reveals an office and production facility gutted by the blaze.

1980: The manufacturing facility is rebuilt and new offices are constructed.

1981: Braun introduces the innovative Chair Topper car-top wheelchair carrier.

1982: The L19 External Lift is introduced. Plant 2 is opened in the Fitz Beverage Building.

1986: The Fairfield, New Jersey division is established.

1987: The 6-Way Power Transfer Seat Base is introduced.

1988: The European office is established in Oslo, Norway.

1989: To meet growing demand, Braun invests heavily in new manufacturing technologies and facilities. Plant 3 opens.

1991: The Braun Entervan is introduced. It was equipped with a ramp and kneel system and removable front seats which allowed the chair user to enter the vehicle independently and drive from their wheelchair.

2015: Patricia Industries, a subsidiary of Investor AB, acquires BraunAbility.
