= Chad Blount =

American racing driver (born 1979)

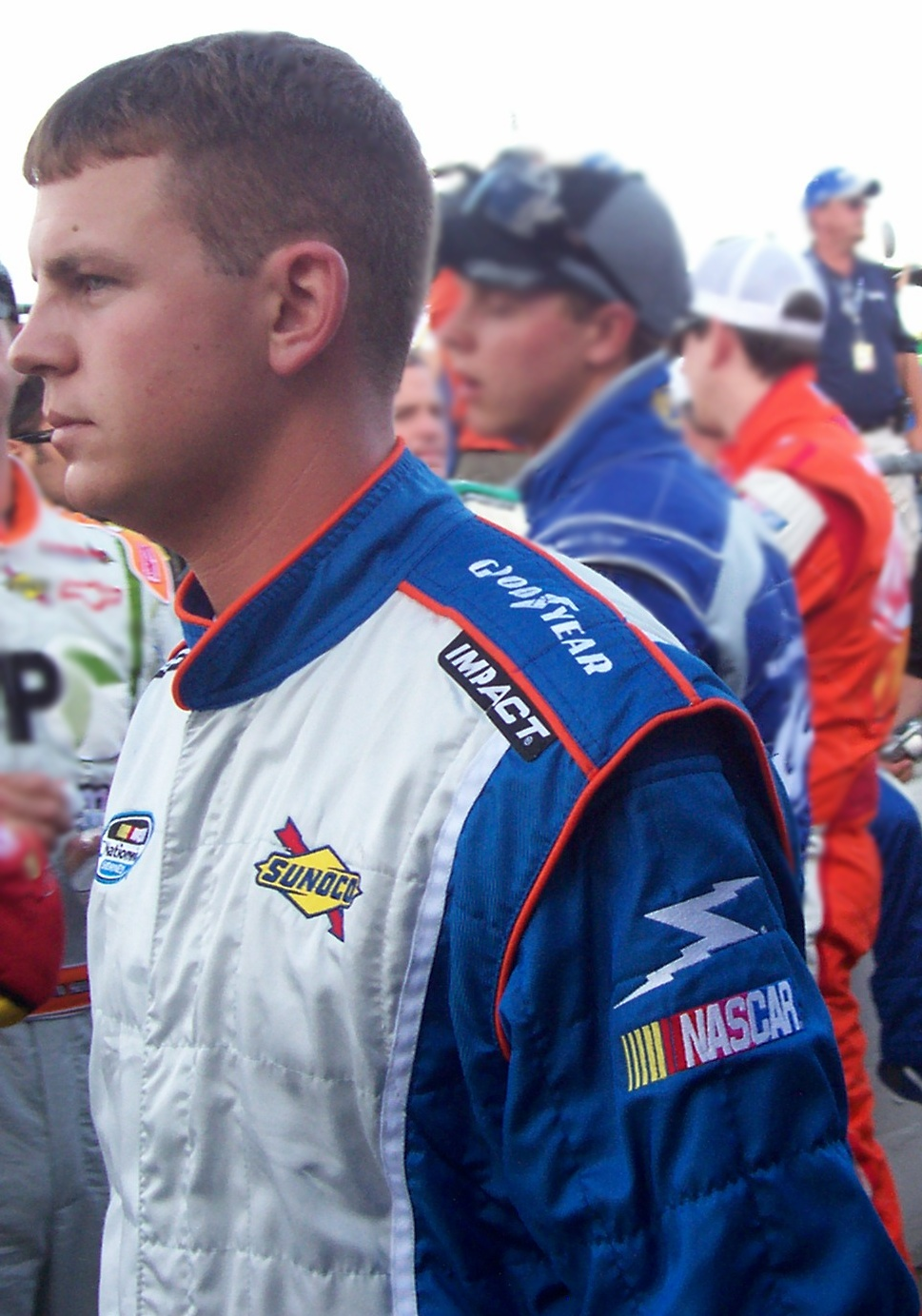
- Blount in 2009
- Born: September 4, 1979 (age 47); Walkerton, Indiana, U.S.

NASCAR Cup Series career
- 4 races run over 2 years
- Best finish: 65th (2006)
- First race: 2004 Tropicana 400 (Chicago)
- Last race: 2006 Chevy Rock & Roll 400 (Richmond)
Wins	Top tens	Poles
0	0	0

NASCAR O'Reilly Auto Parts Series career
- 26 races run over 6 years
- Best finish: 33rd (2003)
- First race: 2003 Koolerz 300 (Daytona)
- Last race: 2010 Sam's Town 300 (Las Vegas)
Wins	Top tens	Poles
0	2	0

NASCAR FedEx Freight Truck Series career
- 1 race run over 1 year
- Best finish: 96th (2004)
- First race: 2004 Silverado 350K (Texas)
Wins	Top tens	Poles
0	0	0
- Statistics up to date as of May 24, 2010.

Chad Blount (born September 4, 1979) is an American former stock car racing driver. He raced in all three of NASCAR's major series, with his last appearance coming in 2010. He currently serves as shop car chief for Rick Ware Racing.

== NASCAR career ==
=== Nextel Cup Series ===
Blount made his debut in the then-Nextel Cup Series during the 2004 season. Driving the No. 37 R&J Racing Dodge, he attempted two races and was able to make the Tropicana 400, but finished 43rd after a mechanical failure. He also made one start in the No. 06 Mobil 1 Dodge for Penske-Jasper Racing at Talladega, however he finished 41st after an engine failure. Blount returned to the series in 2006 with plans to run the full season in the No. 37. After failing to qualify for the Daytona 500, he was released from the team. Beginning with the Golden Corral 500, he was hired by Front Row Motorsports to drive the No. 92 Dodge, which had previously been driven by Randy LaJoie. In fourteen races between the team's No. 34, No. 61 and No. 92 cars, Blount was only able to qualify for two, finishing 42nd at both Martinsville Speedway and Richmond International Raceway.

=== Nationwide Series ===
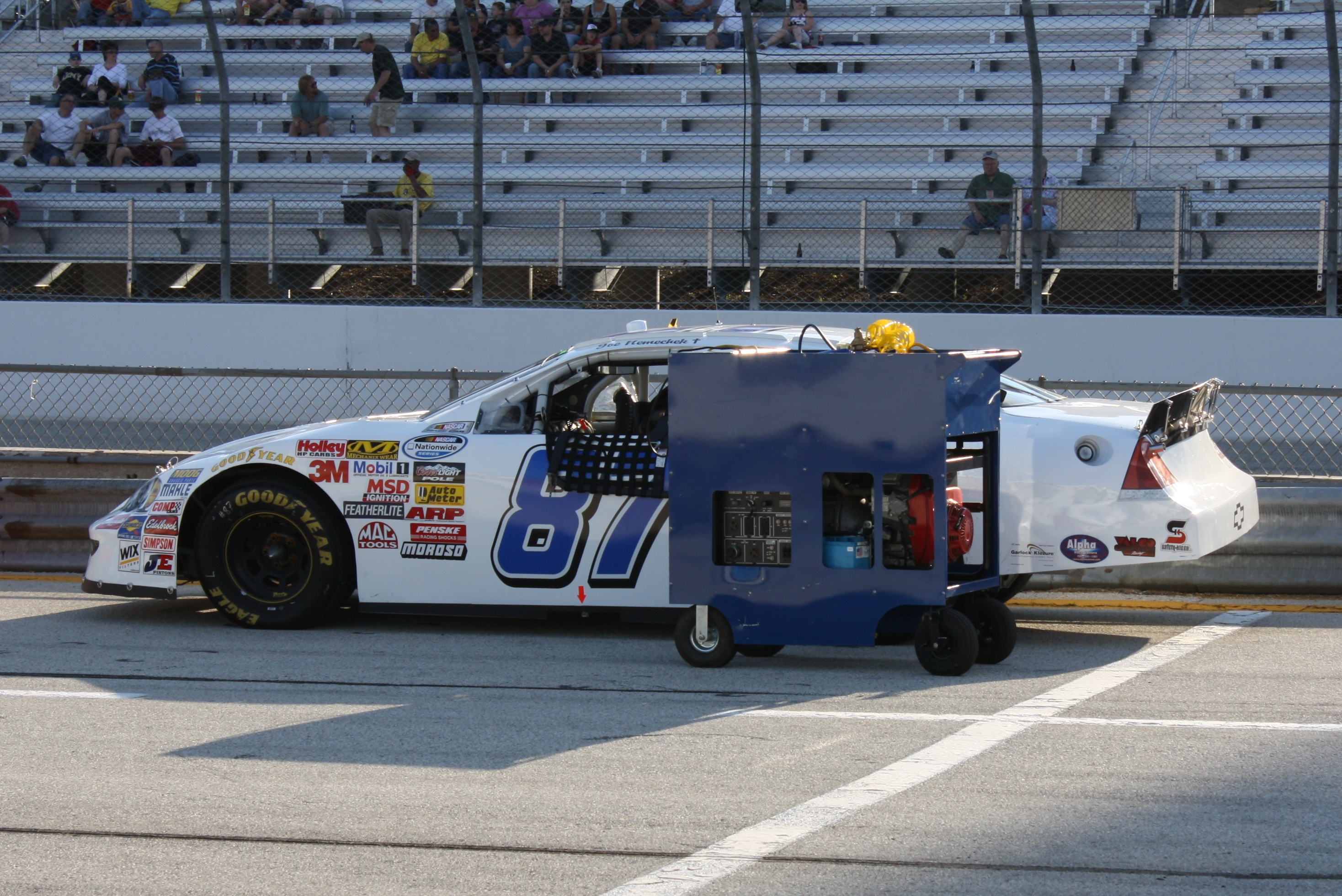
Blount's No. 87 for one race in 2009

Blount began his Busch Series career with Braun Racing in 2003. He would drive the No. 19 APP Prepaid Gas Cards Dodge through the first eleven races, however sponsorship issues forced him to leave the car. During those eleven races for Braun Racing he would post a best finish of fifth at Texas and had a top-ten finish at Nashville. He would return to the series five races later with Welliver-Jesel Motorsports. He would drove the No. 66 Miller High Life Dodge in a total of eight races with a best finish of fifteenth at Michigan. Blount would then drive one race during the 2004 season for Hirschfeld Motorsports, which was a joint venture with Braun Racing. The No. 78 idialdirect.com Dodge finished in 34th place after an accident. In 2005, Blount would attempt three races, one with Braun Racing and two with ML Motorsports. He made the Meijer 300 at Kentucky in the No. 32 Winfuel Chevrolet and would finish that race in the 22nd position. His other two attempts with the No. 70 Foretravel Motorhomes Chevrolet were unable to get him in the field for race day. In 2009, he started and parked for Braun Racing in the No. 10 part-time and in the No. 87 NEMCO Motorsports Chevrolet for one race. Blount returned to the No. 10 again in the 2010 Sam's Town 300 at Las Vegas.

=== Craftsman Truck Series ===
Blount has one career Craftsman Truck Series start, which came in 2004 in the No. 2 Team ASE/Carquest Dodge for Ultra Motorsports. After starting ninth, he would finish 25th due to a crash.

== ARCA career ==
Blount has won eight ARCA races in his racing career. His best season came in 2002 in the No. 77 Dodge for Braun Racing. He finished second in points with four wins, fourteen top-tens, and five poles. His most recent appearance in the series came in 2008 at Nashville Superspeedway in the No. 30 Dodge for Jones Group Racing.

== Motorsports career results ==
=== NASCAR ===
(key) (Bold – Pole position awarded by qualifying time. Italics – Pole position earned by points standings or practice time. * – Most laps led.)

==== Nextel Cup Series ====
NASCAR Nextel Cup Series results
Year	Team	No.	Make	1	2	3	4	5	6	7	8	9	10	11	12	13	14	15	16	17	18	19	20	21	22	23	24	25	26	27	28	29	30	31	32	33	34	35	36	NNCC	Pts	Ref
2004	R&J Racing	37	Dodge	DAY	CAR	LVS	ATL	DAR	BRI	TEX	MAR	TAL	CAL	RCH	CLT	DOV	POC	MCH	SON	DAY; DNQ	CHI; 43	NHA	POC	IND	GLN	MCH	BRI	CAL	RCH	NHA	DOV									81st	74	
2004	Penske-Jasper Racing	06	Dodge																													TAL; 41	KAN	CLT	MAR	ATL	PHO	DAR	HOM	81st	74	
2006	R&J Racing	37	Dodge	DAY; DNQ	CAL	LVS																																		65th	74	
2006	Front Row Motorsports	92	Dodge				ATL; DNQ	BRI; DNQ	MAR; 42	TEX; DNQ	PHO; DNQ	TAL; DNQ	RCH																											65th	74	
2006	Front Row Motorsports	34	Chevy											DAR; DNQ	CLT; DNQ	DOV	POC	MCH	SON										RCH; 42	NHA; DNQ	DOV; DNQ	KAN; DNQ	TAL	CLT	MAR	ATL	TEX	PHO	HOM	65th	74	
2006	Front Row Motorsports	34	Dodge																	DAY; DNQ																				65th	74	
2006	Front Row Motorsports	61	Dodge																		CHI; DNQ	NHA	POC	IND	GLN	MCH	BRI	CAL												65th	74	

===== Daytona 500 =====
Year	Team	Manufacturer	Start	Finish
2006	R&J Racing	Dodge	DNQ	

==== Nationwide Series ====
NASCAR Nationwide Series results
Year	Team	No.	Make	1	2	3	4	5	6	7	8	9	10	11	12	13	14	15	16	17	18	19	20	21	22	23	24	25	26	27	28	29	30	31	32	33	34	35	NNSC	Pts	Ref
2003	Braun Racing	19	Dodge	DAY; 11	CAR; 32	LVS; 29	DAR; 18	BRI; 31	TEX; 5	TAL; 41	NSH; 8	CAL; 33	RCH; 17	GTY; 29	NZH	CLT	DOV	NSH	KEN																				33rd	1581	
2003	Team Jesel	66	Dodge																	MLW; 40	DAY	CHI	NHA	PPR	IRP														33rd	1581	
2003	Carroll Racing	26	Dodge																							MCH; 15	BRI	DAR	RCH; 35	DOV	KAN; 36	CLT; 27	MEM; 21	ATL; 37	PHO	CAR	HOM; 37		33rd	1581	
2004	Hirschfeld Motorsports	78	Dodge	DAY	CAR	LVS	DAR	BRI	TEX	NSH	TAL	CAL	GTY	RCH	NZH	CLT; 34	DOV	NSH	KEN	MLW	DAY	CHI	NHA	PPR	IRP	MCH	BRI	CAL	RCH	DOV	KAN	CLT	MEM	ATL	PHO	DAR	HOM		151st	-	
2005	Braun Racing	32	Chevy	DAY	CAL	MXC	LVS	ATL	NSH	BRI	TEX	PHO	TAL	DAR	RCH	CLT	DOV	NSH	KEN; 22	MLW	DAY	CHI	NHA	PPR	GTY	IRP	GLN	MCH	BRI	CAL	RCH	DOV							113th	97	
2005	ML Motorsports	70	Chevy																														KAN; DNQ	CLT	MEM	TEX; DNQ	PHO	HOM	113th	97	
2008	Fitz Motorsports	36	Dodge	DAY	CAL	LVS	ATL	BRI	NSH	TEX	PHO	MXC	TAL	RCH	DAR	CLT	DOV	NSH	KEN	MLW	NHA	DAY	CHI; DNQ	GTY	IRP	CGV	GLN	MCH	BRI	CAL	RCH	DOV	KAN	CLT	MEM	TEX	PHO	HOM	NA	-	
2009	Braun Racing	10	Toyota	DAY	CAL	LVS	BRI	TEX	NSH	PHO	TAL	RCH	DAR	CLT	DOV	NSH	KEN; 42					GTY; 36	IRP; 38	IOW	GLN	MCH	BRI	CGV	ATL	RCH	DOV	KAN	CAL	CLT	MEM	TEX	PHO	HOM	99th	190	
2009	NEMCO Motorsports	87	Chevy															MLW; 38	NHA	DAY	CHI																		99th	190	
2010	Braun Racing	10	Toyota	DAY	CAL	LVS; 40	BRI	NSH	PHO	TEX	TAL	RCH	DAR	DOV	CLT	NSH	KEN	ROA	NHA	DAY	CHI	GTY	IRP	IOW	GLN	MCH	BRI	CGV	ATL	RCH	DOV	KAN	CAL	CLT	GTY	TEX	PHO	HOM	143rd	43	

==== Craftsman Truck Series ====
NASCAR Craftsman Truck Series results
Year	Team	No.	Make	1	2	3	4	5	6	7	8	9	10	11	12	13	14	15	16	17	18	19	20	21	22	23	24	25	NCTC	Pts	Ref
2004	Ultra Motorsports	2	Dodge	DAY	ATL	MAR	MFD	CLT	DOV	TEX	MEM	MLW	KAN	KEN	GTW	MCH	IRP	NSH	BRI	RCH	NHA	LVS	CAL	TEX; 25	MAR	PHO	DAR	HOM	96th	88	

=== ARCA Re/Max Series ===
(key) (Bold – Pole position awarded by qualifying time. Italics – Pole position earned by points standings or practice time. * – Most laps led.)

ARCA Re/Max Series results
Year	Team	No.	Make	1	2	3	4	5	6	7	8	9	10	11	12	13	14	15	16	17	18	19	20	21	22	23	24	25	ARMC	Pts	Ref
2001	Braun Racing	77	Dodge	DAY	NSH	WIN	SLM	GTY; 9	KEN	CLT	KAN	MCH	POC	MEM	GLN	KEN	MCH; 10	POC	NSH	ISF	CHI; 11	DSF	SLM	TOL					38th	960	
2001	Braun Racing	77	Pontiac																						BLN; 2	CLT			38th	960	
2001	Braun Racing	77	Dodge																								TAL; 7	ATL	38th	960	
2002	Braun Racing	77	Dodge	DAY; 4	**ATL**; 2	NSH; 6	SLM; 28	KEN; 2	CLT; 6	KAN; 4	POC; 15	**MCH**; 1*	**TOL**; 18	SBO; 22	KEN; 1	**BLN**; 2*	POC; 14	NSH; 22	ISF; 8	WIN; 17	DSF; 25	**CHI**; 1*	SLM; 3	TAL; 2	CLT; 1*				2nd	5675	
2004	Braun Racing	64	Dodge	DAY; 7	NSH	SLM	KEN	TOL	CLT	KAN	POC	MCH	SBO	BLN	KEN	GTW	POC	LER	NSH	ISF	TOL	DSF							103rd	225	
2004	Roulo Brothers Racing	39	Dodge																				CHI; 41	SLM	TAL				103rd	225	
2005	ML Motorsports	67	Chevy	DAY; 33	NSH; 1*	SLM; 1*	**KEN**; 2*	TOL; 9	LAN; 5	MIL; 3	POC; 32	MCH; 2	KAN; 1*	KEN; 1*	BLN; 8	POC	GTW	LER	NSH	MCH	ISF	TOL	DSF	CHI	SLM	TAL			18th	2845	
2006	Jan Gibson Racing	56	Dodge	DAY; DNQ	NSH	SLM																							152nd	80	
2006	Jones Group Racing	30	Dodge				WIN; 35	KEN	TOL	POC	MCH	KAN	KEN	BLN	POC	GTW	NSH	MCH	ISF	MIL	TOL	DSF	CHI	SLM	TAL	IOW			152nd	80	
2007	Jones Group Racing	30	Dodge	DAY	USA	NSH; 5	SLM	KAN	WIN	KEN; 5	TOL	IOW	POC	MCH	BLN	KEN	POC	NSH	ISF	MIL	GTW	DSF	CHI	SLM	TAL	TOL			68th	385	
2008	Jones Group Racing	30	Dodge	DAY	SLM	IOW	KAN	CAR	KEN	TOL	POC	MCH	CAY	KEN	BLN	POC	NSH; 21	ISF	DSF	CHI	SLM	NJE	TAL	TOL					124th	125	
