= 2006 Dodge Charger 500 =

Race details
- Race 11 of 36 in the 2006 NASCAR Nextel Cup Series season
- 2006 Dodge Charger 500 program cover
- Date: May 13, 2006
- Official name: Dodge Charger 500
- Location: Darlington Raceway, Darlington County, South Carolina
- Course: Permanent racing facility
- Course length: 1.366 miles (2.198 km)
- Distance: 367 laps, 501.322 mi (806.799 km)
- Weather: Warm with temperatures approaching 78.8 °F (26.0 °C); wind speeds up to 15 miles per hour (24 km/h)
- Average speed: 135.127 miles per hour (217.466 km/h)

Pole position
Driver	Kasey Kahne	Evernham Motorsports
- Time: 29.096

Most laps led
Driver	Greg Biffle	Roush Racing
- Laps: 170

Winner
No. 16	Greg Biffle	Roush Racing

Television in the United States
- Network: Fox Broadcasting Company
- Announcers: Mike Joy, Darrell Waltrip and Larry McReynolds

The 2006 Dodge Charger 500, the 57th running of the event, was held on May 13, 2006 at Darlington Raceway as the eleventh race of the 2006 NASCAR Nextel Cup season. Kasey Kahne won the pole.

== Background ==
Darlington Raceway, nicknamed by many NASCAR fans and drivers as "The Lady in Black" or "The Track Too Tough to Tame" and advertised as a "NASCAR Tradition", is a race track built for NASCAR racing located near Darlington, South Carolina. It is of a unique, somewhat egg-shaped design, an oval with the ends of very different configurations, a condition which supposedly arose from the proximity of one end of the track to a minnow pond the owner refused to relocate. This situation makes it very challenging for the crews to set up their cars' handling in a way that will be effective at both ends.

The track, Darlington Raceway, is a four-turn 1.366 miles (2.198 km) oval. The track's first two turns are banked at twenty-five degrees, while the final two turns are banked two degrees lower at twenty-three degrees. The front stretch (the location of the finish line) and the back stretch is banked at six degrees. Darlington Raceway can seat up to 60,000 people.

== Qualifying ==
Pos	Car #	Driver	Make	Speed	Time	Behind
1	9	Kasey Kahne	Dodge	169.013	29.096	0.000
2	12	Ryan Newman	Dodge	168.192	29.238	-0.142
3	7	Clint Bowyer	Chevrolet	168.071	29.259	-0.163
4	40	David Stremme	Dodge	167.727	29.319	-0.223
5	11	Denny Hamlin	Chevrolet	167.453	29.367	-0.271
6	38	Elliott Sadler	Ford	167.413	29.374	-0.278
7	99	Carl Edwards	Ford	167.379	29.380	-0.284
8	25	Brian Vickers	Chevrolet	167.362	29.383	-0.287
9	16	Greg Biffle	Ford	167.231	29.406	-0.310
10	2	Kurt Busch	Dodge	167.146	29.421	-0.325
11	43	Bobby Labonte	Dodge	167.146	29.421	-0.325
12	24	Jeff Gordon	Chevrolet	167.078	29.433	-0.337
13	20	Tony Stewart	Chevrolet	166.908	29.463	-0.367
14	29	Kevin Harvick	Chevrolet	166.902	29.464	-0.368
15	26	Jamie McMurray	Ford	166.874	29.469	-0.373
16	41	Reed Sorenson	Dodge	166.851	29.473	-0.377
17	6	Mark Martin	Ford	166.619	29.514	-0.418
18	32	Travis Kvapil	Chevrolet	166.619	29.514	-0.418
19	10	Scott Riggs	Dodge	166.495	29.536	-0.440
20	31	Jeff Burton	Chevrolet	166.467	29.541	-0.445
21	42	Casey Mears	Dodge	166.231	29.583	-0.487
22	8	Dale Earnhardt Jr.	Chevrolet	166.174	29.593	-0.497
23	21	Ken Schrader	Ford	166.090	29.608	-0.512
24	7	Robby Gordon	Chevrolet	165.978	29.628	-0.532
25	48	Jimmie Johnson	Chevrolet	165.945	29.634	-0.538
26	18	J. J. Yeley	Chevrolet	165.917	29.639	-0.543
27	14	Sterling Marlin	Chevrolet	165.900	29.642	-0.546
28	66	Jeff Green	Chevrolet	165.855	29.650	-0.554
29	5	Kyle Busch	Chevrolet	165.838	29.653	-0.557
30	19	Jeremy Mayfield	Dodge	165.827	29.655	-0.559
31	17	Matt Kenseth	Ford	165.749	29.669	-0.573
32	22	Dave Blaney	Dodge	165.242	29.760	-0.664
33	74	Derrike Cope	Dodge	165.153	29.776	-0.680
34	95	Stanton Barrett	Chevrolet	164.992	29.805	-0.709
35	88	Dale Jarrett	Ford	164.386	29.915	-0.819
36	1	Joe Nemechek	Chevrolet	164.386	29.915	-0.819
37	55	Michael Waltrip	Dodge	164.270	29.936	-0.840
38	4	Scott Wimmer	Chevrolet	164.117	29.964	-0.868
39	1	Martin Truex Jr.	Chevrolet	164.029	29.980	-0.884
40	45	Kyle Petty	Dodge	163.942	29.996	-0.900
41	49	Kevin Lepage	Dodge	163.615	30.056	-0.960
42	96	Tony Raines	Chevrolet	154.598	31.809	-2.713
43	44	Terry Labonte	Chevrolet		30.381	
Failed to qualify
44	61	Chad Chaffin	Ford		30.108	
45	78	Kenny Wallace	Chevrolet		30.111	
46	37	Carl Long	Dodge		30.127	
47	34	Chad Blount	Chevrolet		30.442	

== Race results ==
Rookie of the year contenders denoted by *

Fin	St	Car #	Driver	Make	Points	Bonus	Laps	Winnings
1	9	16	Greg Biffle	Ford	190	10	367	$290,175
2	12	24	Jeff Gordon	Chevrolet	175	5	367	$223,161
3	31	17	Matt Kenseth	Ford	170	5	367	$205,291
4	25	48	Jimmie Johnson	Chevrolet	165	5	367	$165,311
5	22	8	Dale Earnhardt Jr.	Chevrolet	155		367	$152,916
6	2	12	Ryan Newman	Dodge	155	5	367	$139,333
7	29	5	Kyle Busch	Chevrolet	151	5	367	$120,625
8	17	6	Mark Martin	Ford	142		367	$105,625
9	20	31	Jeff Burton	Chevrolet	138		367	$115,320
10	5	11	Denny Hamlin *	Chevrolet	134		367	$97,900
11	16	41	Reed Sorenson *	Dodge	130		367	$94,375
12	13	20	Tony Stewart	Chevrolet	127		367	$133,386
13	24	7	Robby Gordon	Chevrolet	129	5	367	$85,225
14	39	1	Martin Truex Jr. *	Chevrolet	121		367	$108,408
15	23	21	Ken Schrader	Ford	118		366	$109,814
16	36	1	Joe Nemechek	Chevrolet	115		366	$106,995
17	21	42	Casey Mears	Dodge	112		366	$113,908
18	40	45	Kyle Petty	Dodge	109		366	$103,133
19	10	2	Kurt Busch	Dodge	106		366	$115,633
20	42	96	Tony Raines	Chevrolet	103		366	$76,725
21	1	9	Kasey Kahne	Dodge	105	5	366	$126,439
22	11	43	Bobby Labonte	Dodge	97		366	$113,136
23	3	7	Clint Bowyer *	Chevrolet	94		365	$84,400
24	35	88	Dale Jarrett	Ford	96	5	365	$106,750
25	4	40	David Stremme *	Dodge	88		365	$96,533
26	26	18	J. J. Yeley *	Chevrolet	85		365	$107,775
27	32	22	Dave Blaney	Dodge	87	5	364	$84,158
28	27	14	Sterling Marlin	Chevrolet	79		364	$81,322
29	6	38	Elliott Sadler	Ford	76		364	$99,483
30	18	32	Travis Kvapil	Chevrolet	73		364	$71,400
31	19	10	Scott Riggs	Dodge	70		363	$68,150
32	28	66	Jeff Green	Chevrolet	67		363	$75,975
33	38	4	Scott Wimmer	Chevrolet	64		363	$68,750
34	43	44	Terry Labonte	Chevrolet	61		361	$67,675
35	37	55	Michael Waltrip	Dodge	58		359	$67,450
36	41	49	Kevin Lepage	Dodge	55		353	$67,300
37	14	29	Kevin Harvick	Chevrolet	52		350	$104,036
38	30	19	Jeremy Mayfield	Dodge	49		346	$96,866
39	7	99	Carl Edwards	Ford	46		281	$86,550
40	34	95	Stanton Barrett	Chevrolet	43		255	$66,600
41	8	25	Brian Vickers	Chevrolet	40		246	$74,475
42	15	26	Jamie McMurray	Ford	37		223	$113,200
43	33	74	Derrike Cope	Dodge	34		11	$66,577

Failed to qualify: Chad Chaffin (#61), Kenny Wallace (#78), Carl Long (#37), Chad Blount (#34)

Previous race: 2006 Crown Royal 400	Nextel Cup Series; 2006 season	Next race: 2006 Coca-Cola 600
