= 2006 Samsung/Radio Shack 500 =

Race details
- Race 7 of 36 in the 2006 NASCAR Nextel Cup Series season
- 2006 Samsung/Radio Shack 500 program cover
- Date: April 9, 2006
- Location: Texas Motor Speedway in Fort Worth, Texas
- Course: Permanent racing facility
- Course length: 1.5 miles (2.4 km)
- Distance: 334 laps, 501 mi (806.281 km)
- Weather: Mild with temperatures approaching 77 °F (25 °C); wind speeds up to 8.9 miles per hour (14.3 km/h)
- Average speed: 137.943 miles per hour (221.998 km/h)

Pole position
Driver	Kasey Kahne	Evernham Motorsports
- Time: 28.374

Most laps led
Driver	Tony Stewart	Joe Gibbs
- Laps: 99

Winner
No. 9	Kasey Kahne	Evernham Motorsports

Television in the United States
- Network: Fox
- Announcers: Mike Joy, Darrell Waltrip and Larry McReynolds

The 2006 Samsung/Radio Shack 500, the seventh race of the 2006 NASCAR Nextel Cup season, was held at Texas Motor Speedway on April 9, 2006. Kasey Kahne became the first driver to win at Texas from the pole.

== Qualifying ==
Pos	No.	Driver	Make	Speed	Time	Behind
1	9	Kasey Kahne	Dodge	190.315	28.374	0.000
2	18	J. J. Yeley	Chevrolet	189.374	28.515	-0.141
3	6	Mark Martin	Ford	189.029	28.567	-0.193
4	66	Jeff Green	Chevrolet	189.016	28.569	-0.195
5	16	Greg Biffle	Ford	188.976	28.575	-0.201
6	17	Matt Kenseth	Ford	188.910	28.585	-0.211
7	2	Kurt Busch	Dodge	188.897	28.587	-0.213
8	11	Denny Hamlin	Chevrolet	188.772	28.606	-0.232
9	1	Martin Truex Jr.	Chevrolet	188.640	28.626	-0.252
10	43	Bobby Labonte	Dodge	188.594	28.633	-0.259
11	24	Jeff Gordon	Chevrolet	188.337	28.672	-0.298
12	7	Clint Bowyer	Chevrolet	188.304	28.677	-0.303
13	41	Reed Sorenson	Dodge	188.219	28.690	-0.316
14	12	Ryan Newman	Dodge	188.068	28.713	-0.339
15	8	Dale Earnhardt Jr.	Chevrolet	188.048	28.716	-0.342
16	48	Jimmie Johnson	Chevrolet	187.977	28.727	-0.353
17	1	Joe Nemechek	Chevrolet	187.918	28.736	-0.362
18	14	Sterling Marlin	Chevrolet	187.780	28.757	-0.383
19	45	Kyle Petty	Dodge	187.754	28.761	-0.387
20	42	Casey Mears	Dodge	187.748	28.762	-0.388
21	31	Jeff Burton	Chevrolet	187.598	28.785	-0.411
22	10	Scott Riggs	Dodge	187.422	28.812	-0.438
23	151	Mike Garvey	Chevrolet	187.389	28.817	-0.443
24	29	Kevin Harvick	Chevrolet	187.272	28.835	-0.461
25	38	Elliott Sadler	Ford	187.007	28.876	-0.502
26	5	Kyle Busch	Chevrolet	186.948	28.885	-0.511
27	88	Dale Jarrett	Ford	186.903	28.892	-0.518
28	40	David Stremme	Dodge	186.832	28.903	-0.529
29	7	Robby Gordon	Chevrolet	186.748	28.916	-0.542
30	44	Terry Labonte	Chevrolet	186.741	28.917	-0.543
31	22	Dave Blaney	Dodge	186.696	28.924	-0.550
32	21	Ken Schrader	Ford	186.696	28.924	-0.550
33	25	Brian Vickers	Chevrolet	186.580	28.942	-0.568
34	19	Jeremy Mayfield	Dodge	186.574	28.943	-0.569
35	61	Kevin Lepage	Ford	186.124	29.013	-0.639
36	96	Tony Raines	Chevrolet	186.066	29.022	-0.648
37	99	Carl Edwards	Ford	185.822	29.060	-0.686
38	74	Derrike Cope	Dodge	185.624	29.091	-0.717
39	32	Travis Kvapil	Chevrolet	185.567	29.100	-0.726
40	20	Tony Stewart	Chevrolet	185.382	29.129	-0.755
41	26	Jamie McMurray	Ford	184.818	29.218	-0.844
42	55	Michael Waltrip	Dodge	184.641	29.246	-0.872
43	4	Scott Wimmer	Chevrolet	184.862	29.211	-0.837
Failed to qualify
44	49	Brent Sherman	Dodge			
45	92	Chad Blount	Dodge			
46	78	Kenny Wallace	Chevrolet			
47	34	Chad Chaffin	Chevrolet			
48	95	Stanton Barrett	Chevrolet			

== Race results ==
Fin	St	No.	Driver	Make	Laps	Points	Bonus	Winnings
1	1	9	Kasey Kahne	Dodge	334	185	5	$530,164
2	6	17	Matt Kenseth	Ford	334	175	5	$362,491
3	40	20	Tony Stewart	Chevrolet	334	175	10	$286,386
4	8	11	Denny Hamlin *	Chevrolet	334	165	5	$208,500
5	24	29	Kevin Harvick	Chevrolet	334	160	5	$204,511
6	21	31	Jeff Burton	Chevrolet	334	150		$172,220
7	22	10	Scott Riggs	Dodge	334	146		$133,850
8	9	1	Martin Truex Jr. *	Chevrolet	334	147	5	$156,608
9	3	6	Mark Martin	Ford	334	143	5	$151,850
10	10	43	Bobby Labonte	Dodge	334	134		$164,211
11	16	48	Jimmie Johnson	Chevrolet	334	130		$165,161
12	15	8	Dale Earnhardt Jr.	Chevrolet	334	127		$154,816
13	13	41	Reed Sorenson *	Dodge	334	124		$126,675
14	20	42	Casey Mears	Dodge	334	121		$150,233
15	26	5	Kyle Busch	Chevrolet	334	118		$129,725
16	32	21	Ken Schrader	Ford	334	115		$140,089
17	27	88	Dale Jarrett	Ford	334	112		$143,350
18	4	66	Jeff Green	Chevrolet	334	114	5	$133,833
19	12	07	Clint Bowyer *	Chevrolet	333	106		$116,075
20	29	7	Robby Gordon	Chevrolet	333	103		$109,275
21	28	40	David Stremme *	Dodge	333	100		$127,033
22	11	24	Jeff Gordon	Chevrolet	332	97		$148,411
23	17	1	Joe Nemechek	Chevrolet	332	94		$129,070
24	36	96	Tony Raines	Chevrolet	332	91		$97,075
25	30	44	Terry Labonte	Chevrolet	332	88		$95,975
26	42	55	Michael Waltrip	Dodge	331	85		$108,833
27	39	32	Travis Kvapil	Chevrolet	331	82		$105,122
28	43	4	Scott Wimmer	Chevrolet	330	79		$94,075
29	31	22	Dave Blaney	Dodge	330	76		$92,475
30	18	14	Sterling Marlin	Chevrolet	329	73		$89,325
31	34	19	Jeremy Mayfield	Dodge	328	70		$116,891
32	35	61	Kevin Lepage	Ford	328	67		$85,800
33	25	38	Elliott Sadler	Ford	286	69	5	$113,558
34	7	2	Kurt Busch	Dodge	286	61		$124,633
35	2	18	J. J. Yeley *	Chevrolet	270	63	5	$118,075
36	37	99	Carl Edwards	Ford	256	60	5	$101,175
37	41	26	Jamie McMurray	Ford	254	52		$127,100
38	23	151	Mike Garvey	Chevrolet	251	49		$79,125
39	19	45	Kyle Petty	Dodge	248	46		$87,000
40	14	12	Ryan Newman	Dodge	200	43		$124,283
41	38	74	Derrike Cope	Dodge	169	PE		$78,760
42	5	16	Greg Biffle	Ford	81	42	5	$98,860
43	33	25	Brian Vickers	Chevrolet	24	34		$86,847

Failed to qualify: Brent Sherman (#49), Chad Blount (#92), Kenny Wallace (#78), Chad Chaffin (#34), Stanton Barrett (#95).

Previous race: 2006 DirecTV 500	Nextel Cup Series; 2006 season	Next race: 2006 Subway Fresh 500
