= 2006 Subway Fresh 500 =

Car race

Race details
- Race 8 of 36 in the 2006 NASCAR Nextel Cup Series season
- 2006 Subway Fresh 500 program cover, with paintings of Greg Biffle and Joe Nemechek
- Date: April 22, 2006
- Location: Phoenix International Raceway in Avondale, Arizona
- Course: Permanent racing facility
- Course length: 1 miles (1.6 km)
- Distance: 312 laps, 312 mi (502.115 km)
- Weather: Hot with temperatures approaching 93.9 °F (34.4 °C); wind speeds up to 15.9 miles per hour (25.6 km/h)
- Average speed: 107.063 miles per hour (172.301 km/h)

Pole position
Driver	Kyle Busch	Hendrick Motorsports
- Time: 26.917

Most laps led
Driver	Greg Biffle	Roush Racing
- Laps: 151

Winner
No. 29	Kevin Harvick	Richard Childress Racing

Television in the United States
- Network: Fox
- Announcers: Mike Joy, Darrell Waltrip and Larry McReynolds

The 2006 Subway Fresh 500, the eighth race of the 2006 NASCAR Nextel Cup Series season, was held at Phoenix International Raceway on April 22, 2006. Kyle Busch won the pole.

== Qualifying ==
Pos	No.	Driver	Make	Speed	Time	Behind
1	5	Kyle Busch	Chevrolet	133.745	26.917	0.000
2	16	Greg Biffle	Ford	133.383	26.990	-0.073
3	20	Tony Stewart	Chevrolet	133.299	27.007	-0.090
4	17	Matt Kenseth	Ford	133.205	27.026	-0.109
5	99	Carl Edwards	Ford	133.028	27.062	-0.145
6	11	Denny Hamlin	Chevrolet	132.846	27.099	-0.182
7	2	Kurt Busch	Dodge	132.817	27.105	-0.188
8	7	Clint Bowyer	Chevrolet	132.587	27.152	-0.235
9	1	Martin Truex Jr	Chevrolet	132.523	27.165	-0.248
10	48	Jimmie Johnson	Chevrolet	132.397	27.191	-0.274
11	8	Dale Earnhardt Jr	Chevrolet	132.363	27.198	-0.281
12	42	Casey Mears	Dodge	132.163	27.239	-0.322
13	12	Ryan Newman	Dodge	132.163	27.239	-0.322
14	25	Brian Vickers	Chevrolet	132.120	27.248	-0.331
15	29	Kevin Harvick	Chevrolet	132.081	27.256	-0.339
16	14	Sterling Marlin	Chevrolet	132.076	27.257	-0.340
17	88	Dale Jarrett	Ford	131.955	27.282	-0.365
18	6	Mark Martin	Ford	131.878	27.298	-0.381
19	24	Jeff Gordon	Chevrolet	131.829	27.308	-0.391
20	38	Elliott Sadler	Ford	131.781	27.318	-0.401
21	43	Bobby Labonte	Dodge	131.738	27.327	-0.410
22	9	Kasey Kahne	Dodge	131.714	27.332	-0.415
23	66	Jeff Green	Chevrolet	131.685	27.338	-0.421
24	10	Scott Riggs	Dodge	131.675	27.340	-0.423
25	7	Robby Gordon	Chevrolet	131.608	27.354	-0.437
26	26	Jamie McMurray	Ford	131.483	27.380	-0.463
27	21	Ken Schrader	Ford	131.368	27.404	-0.487
28	19	Jeremy Mayfield	Dodge	130.942	27.493	-0.576
29	40	David Stremme	Dodge	130.857	27.511	-0.594
30	18	JJ Yeley	Chevrolet	130.842	27.514	-0.597
31	78	Kenny Wallace	Chevrolet	130.458	27.595	-0.678
32	1	Joe Nemechek	Chevrolet	130.416	27.604	-0.687
33	4	Scott Wimmer	Chevrolet	130.416	27.604	-0.687
34	41	Reed Sorenson	Dodge	130.322	27.624	-0.707
35	95	Stanton Barrett	Chevrolet	130.114	27.668	-0.751
36	96	Tony Raines	Chevrolet	130.077	27.676	-0.759
37	31	Jeff Burton	Chevrolet	129.814	27.732	-0.815
38	45	Kyle Petty	Dodge	129.478	27.804	-0.887
39	32	Travis Kvapil	Chevrolet	129.320	27.838	-0.921
40	02	Brandon Ash	Dodge	128.843	27.941	-1.024
41	22	Dave Blaney	Dodge	128.411	28.035	-1.118
42	55	Michael Waltrip	Dodge	126.613	28.433	-1.516
43	49	Brent Sherman	Dodge	128.576	27.999	-1.082
Failed to qualify or withdrew
44	34	Chad Chaffin	Chevrolet		28.031	-1.114
45	51	Mike Garvey	Chevrolet		28.083	-1.166
46	92	Chad Blount	Dodge		28.150	-1.233
47	61	Kevin Lepage	Chevrolet		28.173	-1.256
48	89	Morgan Shepherd	Dodge		28.233	-1.316
49	52	Steve Portenga	Dodge		28.336	-1.419
WD	74	Derrike Cope	Dodge	0.000	0.000	0.000

== Race results ==
Pos	No	Driver	Manufacturer	Laps	Status	Lead	Points
1	29	Kevin Harvick	Chevrolet	312	running	10	185
2	20	Tony Stewart	Chevrolet	312	running	6	175
3	17	Matt Kenseth	Ford	312	running	1	170
4	99	Carl Edwards	Ford	312	running	0	160
5	07	Clint Bowyer	Chevrolet	312	running	21	160
6	9	Kasey Kahne	Dodge	312	running	0	150
7	48	Jimmie Johnson	Chevrolet	312	running	0	146
8	43	Bobby Labonte	Dodge	312	running	0	142
9	31	Jeff Burton	Chevrolet	312	running	0	138
10	24	Jeff Gordon	Chevrolet	312	running	0	134
11	6	Mark Martin	Ford	311	running	111	135
12	14	Sterling Marlin	Chevrolet	311	running	0	127
13	25	Brian Vickers	Chevrolet	311	running	0	124
14	26	Jamie McMurray	Ford	311	running	0	121
15	16	Greg Biffle	Ford	311	running	151	128
16	21	Ken Schrader	Ford	311	running	0	115
17	96	Tony Raines	Chevrolet	311	running	0	112
18	66	Jeff Green	Chevrolet	311	running	0	109
19	88	Dale Jarrett	Ford	311	running	0	106
20	42	Casey Mears	Dodge	311	running	0	103
21	32	Travis Kvapil	Chevrolet	311	running	0	100
22	1	Martin Truex Jr.	Chevrolet	311	running	0	97
23	8	Dale Earnhardt Jr.	Chevrolet	310	running	0	94
24	2	Kurt Busch	Dodge	310	running	0	91
25	78	Kenny Wallace	Chevrolet	310	running	0	88
26	19	Jeremy Mayfield	Dodge	310	running	0	85
27	22	Dave Blaney	Dodge	309	running	2	87
28	18	J. J. Yeley	Chevrolet	309	running	1	84
29	40	David Stremme	Dodge	308	running	0	76
30	4	Scott Wimmer	Chevrolet	307	running	0	73
31	45	Kyle Petty	Dodge	305	running	0	70
32	49	Brent Sherman	Dodge	305	running	0	67
33	95	Stanton Barrett	Chevrolet	301	running	0	64
34	11	Denny Hamlin	Chevrolet	289	running	0	61
35	01	Joe Nemechek	Chevrolet	283	running	0	58
36	5	Kyle Busch	Chevrolet	259	running	7	60
37	38	Elliott Sadler	Ford	247	running	1	57
38	10	Scott Riggs	Dodge	229	running	0	49
39	12	Ryan Newman	Dodge	221	crash	0	46
40	41	Reed Sorenson	Dodge	206	running	0	43
41	7	Robby Gordon	Chevrolet	116	engine	0	40
42	55	Michael Waltrip	Dodge	98	crash	0	37
43	02	Brandon Ash	Dodge	98	transmission	1	39
Race Results

Failed to qualify: Chad Chaffin (#34), Mike Garvey (#51), Chad Blount (#92), Kevin Lepage (#61), Morgan Shepherd (#89), Steve Portenga (#52)

Previous race: 2006 Samsung/Radio Shack 500	Nextel Cup Series; 2006 season	Next race: 2006 Aaron's 499
