= 2006 Aaron's 499 =

Race details
- Race 9 of 36 in the 2006 NASCAR Nextel Cup Series season
- 2006 Aaron's 499 program cover
- Date: April 30, 2006
- Official name: Aaron's 499
- Location: Talladega Superspeedway, Talladega, Alabama
- Course: Permanent racing facility
- Course length: 2.66 miles (4.28 km)
- Distance: 188 laps, 500.08 mi (804.8 km)
- Weather: Mild with temperatures approaching 75.8 °F (24.3 °C); wind speeds up to 8.9 miles per hour (14.3 km/h)
- Average speed: 142.891 miles per hour (229.961 km/h)

Pole position
Driver	Elliott Sadler	Robert Yates Racing
- Time: 50.798

Most laps led
Driver	Jeff Gordon	Hendrick Motorsports
- Laps: 62

Winner
No. 48	Jimmie Johnson	Hendrick Motorsports

Television in the United States
- Network: Fox Broadcasting Company
- Announcers: Mike Joy, Darrell Waltrip and Larry McReynolds

The 2006 Aaron's 499 was the ninth race of the 2006 NASCAR Nextel Cup Series season. It was scheduled to be held on April 30, 2006 at the 2.6-mile long Talladega Superspeedway, but due to rain starting one lap prior to the green flag, however, the race was postponed until the following day. Television coverage was moved from Fox to FX except for several Fox stations that elected to carry the race. Elliott Sadler won the pole position, while Jimmie Johnson won the race. The Aaron's 499 was one of five impound races of the season, meaning that the teams could not make any changes on the car after qualifying.

== Qualifying ==
Pos	No.	Driver	Make	Speed	Time	Behind
1	38	Elliott Sadler	Ford	188.511	50.798	0.000
2	20	Tony Stewart	Chevrolet	187.658	51.029	-0.231
3	99	Carl Edwards	Ford	187.320	51.121	-0.323
4	88	Dale Jarrett	Ford	187.232	51.145	-0.347
5	2	Kurt Busch	Dodge	187.137	51.171	-0.373
6	1	Joe Nemechek	Chevrolet	187.130	51.173	-0.375
7	16	Greg Biffle	Ford	186.991	51.211	-0.413
8	26	Jamie McMurray	Ford	186.933	51.227	-0.429
9	14	Sterling Marlin	Chevrolet	186.925	51.229	-0.431
10	6	Mark Martin	Ford	186.856	51.248	-0.450
11	18	JJ Yeley	Chevrolet	186.827	51.256	-0.458
12	17	Matt Kenseth	Ford	186.685	51.295	-0.497
13	5	Kyle Busch	Chevrolet	186.652	51.304	-0.506
14	24	Jeff Gordon	Chevrolet	186.587	51.322	-0.524
15	7	Clint Bowyer	Chevrolet	186.521	51.340	-0.542
16	48	Jimmie Johnson	Chevrolet	186.478	51.352	-0.554
17	40	David Stremme	Dodge	186.463	51.356	-0.558
18	12	Ryan Newman	Dodge	186.427	51.366	-0.568
19	7	Robby Gordon	Chevrolet	186.217	51.424	-0.626
20	1	Martin Truex Jr	Chevrolet	186.018	51.479	-0.681
21	55	Michael Waltrip	Dodge	185.971	51.492	-0.694
22	27	Kirk Shelmerdine	Chevrolet	185.787	51.543	-0.745
23	61	Kevin Lepage	Ford	185.761	51.550	-0.752
24	00	Hermie Sadler	Ford	185.758	51.551	-0.753
25	42	Casey Mears	Dodge	185.689	51.570	-0.772
26	32	Travis Kvapil	Chevrolet	185.632	51.586	-0.788
27	8	Dale Earnhardt Jr	Chevrolet	185.578	51.601	-0.803
28	45	Kyle Petty	Dodge	185.571	51.603	-0.805
29	96	Tony Raines	Chevrolet	185.527	51.615	-0.817
30	11	Denny Hamlin	Chevrolet	185.445	51.638	-0.840
31	43	Bobby Labonte	Dodge	185.423	51.644	-0.846
32	10	Scott Riggs	Dodge	185.423	51.644	-0.846
33	25	Brian Vickers	Chevrolet	185.348	51.665	-0.867
34	34	Chad Chaffin	Chevrolet	185.230	51.698	-0.900
35	21	Ken Schrader	Ford	185.140	51.723	-0.925
36	19	Jeremy Mayfield	Dodge	185.126	51.727	-0.929
37	9	Kasey Kahne	Dodge	185.104	51.733	-0.935
38	22	Dave Blaney	Dodge	184.815	51.814	-1.016
39	66	Jeff Green	Chevrolet	184.249	51.973	-1.175
40	31	Jeff Burton	Chevrolet	184.012	52.040	-1.242
41	41	Reed Sorenson	Dodge	183.892	52.074	-1.276
42	29	Kevin Harvick	Chevrolet	183.864	52.082	-1.284
43	4	Scott Wimmer	Chevrolet	185.154	51.719	-0.921
Failed to qualify
44	89	Morgan Shepherd	Dodge		51.805	
45	95	Stanton Barrett	Chevrolet		51.815	
46	09	Mike Wallace	Ford		51.877	
47	92	Chad Blount	Dodge		52.225	
48	49	Brent Sherman	Dodge		52.324	
49	78	Kenny Wallace	Chevrolet		52.443	

== Race results ==
Pos	Grid	No.	Driver	Make	Points	Bonus	Laps	Winnings
1	16	48	Jimmie Johnson	Chevrolet	185	5	188	$326,061
2	2	20	Tony Stewart	Chevrolet	175	5	188	$260,136
3	33	25	Brian Vickers	Chevrolet	170	5	188	$172,300
4	40	31	Jeff Burton	Chevrolet	160		188	$176,745
5	8	26	Jamie McMurray	Ford	160	5	188	$168,600
6	12	17	Matt Kenseth	Ford	155	5	188	$159,841
7	5	2	Kurt Busch	Dodge	151	5	188	$143,233
8	3	99	Carl Edwards	Ford	147	5	188	$118,975
9	32	10	Scott Riggs	Dodge	138		188	$97,975
10	19	7	Robby Gordon	Chevrolet	139	5	188	$103,350
11	11	18	J. J. Yeley *	Chevrolet	135	5	188	$131,075
12	4	88	Dale Jarrett	Ford	132	5	188	$125,875
13	36	19	Jeremy Mayfield	Dodge	129	5	188	$124,816
14	39	66	Jeff Green	Chevrolet	126	5	188	$117,808
15	14	24	Jeff Gordon	Chevrolet	128	10	188	$151,311
16	1	38	Elliott Sadler	Ford	120	5	188	$138,983
17	29	96	Tony Raines	Chevrolet	112		188	$84,675
18	28	45	Kyle Petty	Dodge	109		188	$111,883
19	26	32	Travis Kvapil	Chevrolet	106		188	$101,083
20	25	42	Casey Mears	Dodge	108	5	188	$123,083
21	43	4	Scott Wimmer	Chevrolet	105	5	188	$85,350
22	30	11	Denny Hamlin *	Chevrolet	102	5	187	$84,625
23	42	29	Kevin Harvick	Chevrolet	94		187	$121,811
24	38	22	Dave Blaney	Dodge	96	5	183	$94,858
25	21	55	Michael Waltrip	Dodge	93	5	179	$92,447
26	41	41	Reed Sorenson *	Dodge	85		177	$89,825
27	6	01	Joe Nemechek	Chevrolet	87	5	173	$107,620
28	23	61	Kevin Lepage	Ford	84	5	173	$80,225
29	31	43	Bobby Labonte	Dodge	76		163	$114,461
30	34	34	Chad Chaffin	Chevrolet	73		152	$77,825
31	27	8	Dale Earnhardt Jr.	Chevrolet	75	5	151	$112,166
32	13	5	Kyle Busch	Chevrolet	67		150	$95,025
33	18	12	Ryan Newman	Dodge	64		106	$122,308
34	17	40	David Stremme *	Dodge	61		106	$85,725
35	10	6	Mark Martin	Ford	58		101	$94,650
36	20	1	Martin Truex Jr. *	Chevrolet	55		97	$84,500
37	9	14	Sterling Marlin	Chevrolet	52		91	$76,325
38	7	16	Greg Biffle	Ford	49		45	$96,175
39	37	9	Kasey Kahne	Dodge	46		17	$112,989
40	15	07	Clint Bowyer *	Chevrolet	43		16	$83,525
41	22	27	Kirk Shelmerdine	Chevrolet	40		9	$75,325
42	35	21	Ken Schrader	Ford	37		8	$102,364
43	24	0	Hermie Sadler	Ford	PE		8	$75,308

Failed to qualify: Morgan Shepherd (No. 89), Stanton Barrett (No. 95), Mike Wallace (No. 09), Chad Blount (No. 92), Brent Sherman (No. 49), Kenny Wallace (No. 78)

Previous race: 2006 Subway Fresh 500	Nextel Cup Series; 2006 season	Next race: 2006 Crown Royal 400
