= 2006 Banquet 400 =

29th race of the NASCAR Nextel Cup series

Race details
- Race 29 of 36 in the 2006 NASCAR Nextel Cup Series
- 2006 Banquet 400 program cover
- Date: October 1, 2006
- Official name: Banquet 400 Presented by ConAgra Foods
- Location: Kansas Speedway, Kansas City, Kansas
- Course: Permanent racing facility
- Course length: 1.5 miles (2.414 km)
- Distance: 267 laps, 400.5 mi (644.542 km)
- Weather: Temperatures up to 91.4 °F (33.0 °C); wind speeds up to 17.26 miles per hour (27.78 km/h)
- Average speed: 121.753 mph (195.942 km/h)
- Attendance: 125,000

Pole position
| Driver | Kasey Kahne | Evernham Motorsports |
- Time: 30.273

Most laps led
| Driver | Jimmie Johnson | Hendrick Motorsports |
- Laps: 105

Winner
| No. 20 | Tony Stewart | Joe Gibbs Racing |

Television in the United States
- Network: NBC
- Announcers: Bill Weber, Wally Dallenbach Jr.
- Nielsen ratings: 4.0/9 (Final); 3.4/7 (Overnight)

Radio in the United States
- Radio: Motor Racing Network
- Booth announcers: Joe Moore, Barney Hall
- Turn announcers: Dave Moody (turns 1 and 2), Mike Bagley (turns 3 and 4)

The 2006 Banquet 400 was the twenty-ninth stock car race of the 2006 NASCAR Nextel Cup Series and the third in the ten-race season-ending Chase for the Nextel Cup. It was held on October 1, 2006, at Kansas Speedway in Kansas City, Kansas before a crowd of 125,000. The 267-lap race was won by Tony Stewart of the Joe Gibbs Racing team who started from twenty-first position. Casey Mears finished second and Mark Martin came in third.

Pole position driver Kasey Kahne led the field until Jimmie Johnson moved into the first position after a caution period. Johnson lost the lead when he was passed by Kahne's teammate Scott Riggs on lap 28. He held the position for the next seven laps until Clint Bowyer took over the lead. Dale Earnhardt Jr. moved into first on the 64th lap and held it for sixteen laps when he was passed by Kyle Busch. Busch held the lead position for 64 laps. Bowyer reclaimed the first position and led for a further 17 laps, before Johnson moved ahead of him. After drivers made pit stops for fuel, Stewart took over the lead after electing to stay out, and held the position to win the race despite running out of fuel on the race's final lap. The race had a total of eleven cautions and twenty lead changes by thirteen different drivers.

It was Stewart's third win of the season, and the twenty-seventh of his career. The result kept Jeff Burton in the lead of the Drivers' Championship, sixty-nine points in front of Kevin Harvick. Martin moved up into third place, while Jeff Gordon fell to sixth because he retired with a broken fuel-pump. Chevrolet maintained its lead in the Manufacturers' Championship, forty-seven ahead of Ford and forty-eight in front of Dodge with seven races left in the season.

== Background ==
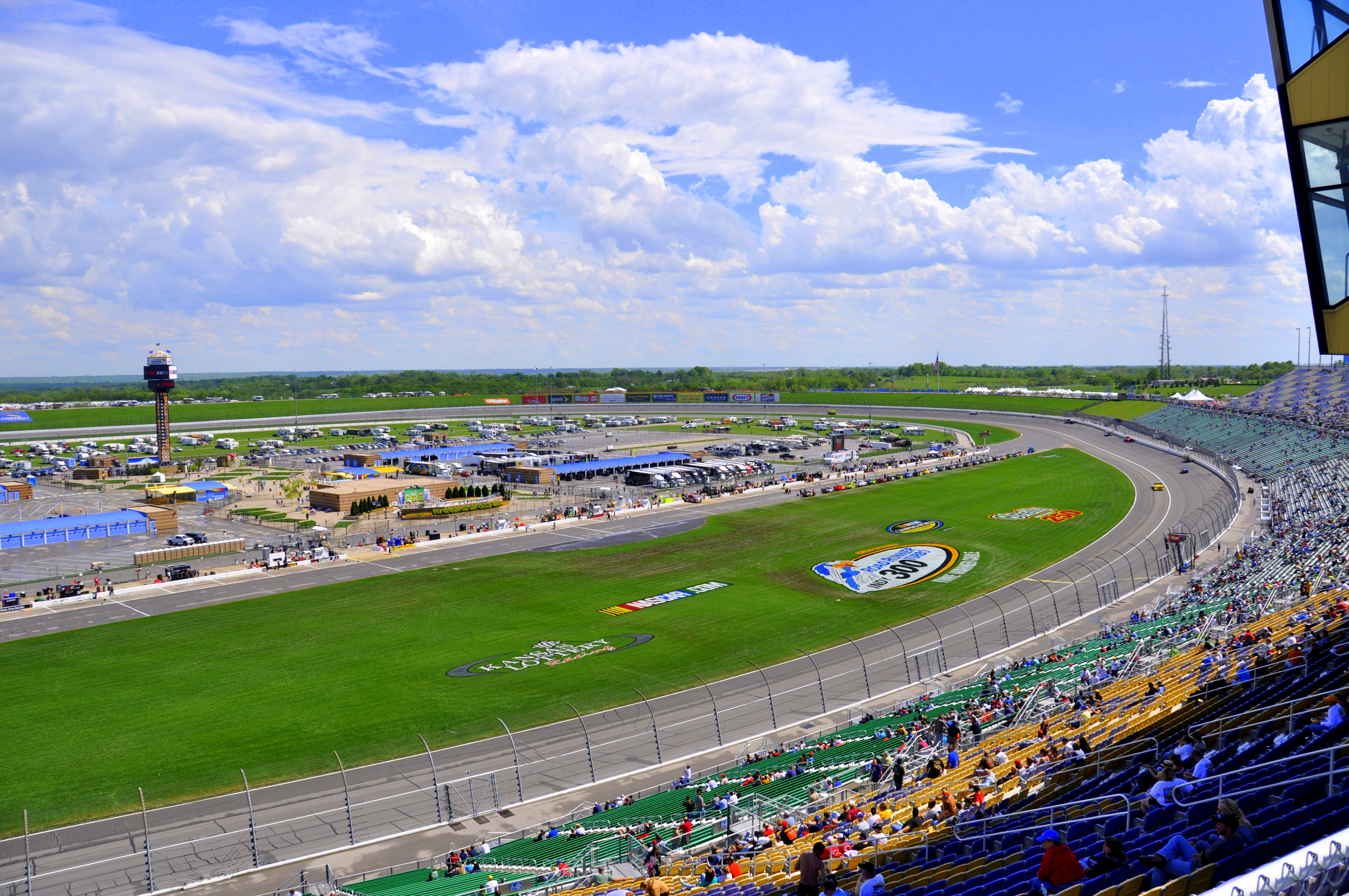
Kansas Speedway, where the race was held.

The Banquet 400 was the 29th out of 36 scheduled stock car races of the 2006 NASCAR Nextel Cup Series and the third in the ten-race season-ending Chase for the Nextel Cup. It was held on October 1, 2006, in Kansas City, Kansas at Kansas Speedway, an intermediate track that holds NASCAR races. The standard track at Kansas Speedway is a four-turn D-shaped oval track that is 1.5 miles (2.4 kilometres) long. The track's turns are banked at fifteen degrees, while the front stretch, the location of the finish line, is 10.4 degrees. The back stretch, opposite of the front, is at only five degrees.

Before the race, Jeff Burton led the Drivers' Championship with 5,351 points, with Jeff Gordon second and Matt Kenseth third. Denny Hamlin and Kevin Harvick were fourth and fifth, and Mark Martin, Dale Earnhardt Jr., Jimmie Johnson, Kasey Kahne and Kyle Busch rounded out the top ten drivers competing for the 2006 Chase for the Nextel Cup. Chevrolet led the Manufacturers' Championship with 213 points; Ford was second on 171 points, with Dodge a close third on 168. Martin was the race's defending champion.

After he was involved in a crash at the previous race (at Dover International Speedway), Kahne said he would attempt to improve his position in the championship by winning races: "I think we have an all right shot. If we do things like I know we can, like my team has done all year long, this team can definitely come back." Gordon said his team had been gaining momentum, and stated he felt comfortable with his position. Johnson stated he would attempt to lead as many laps as he could at Kansas Speedway, and felt it was a track where he could achieve a good result which would improve his position in the championship and aimed for a top starting place.

== Practice and qualification ==
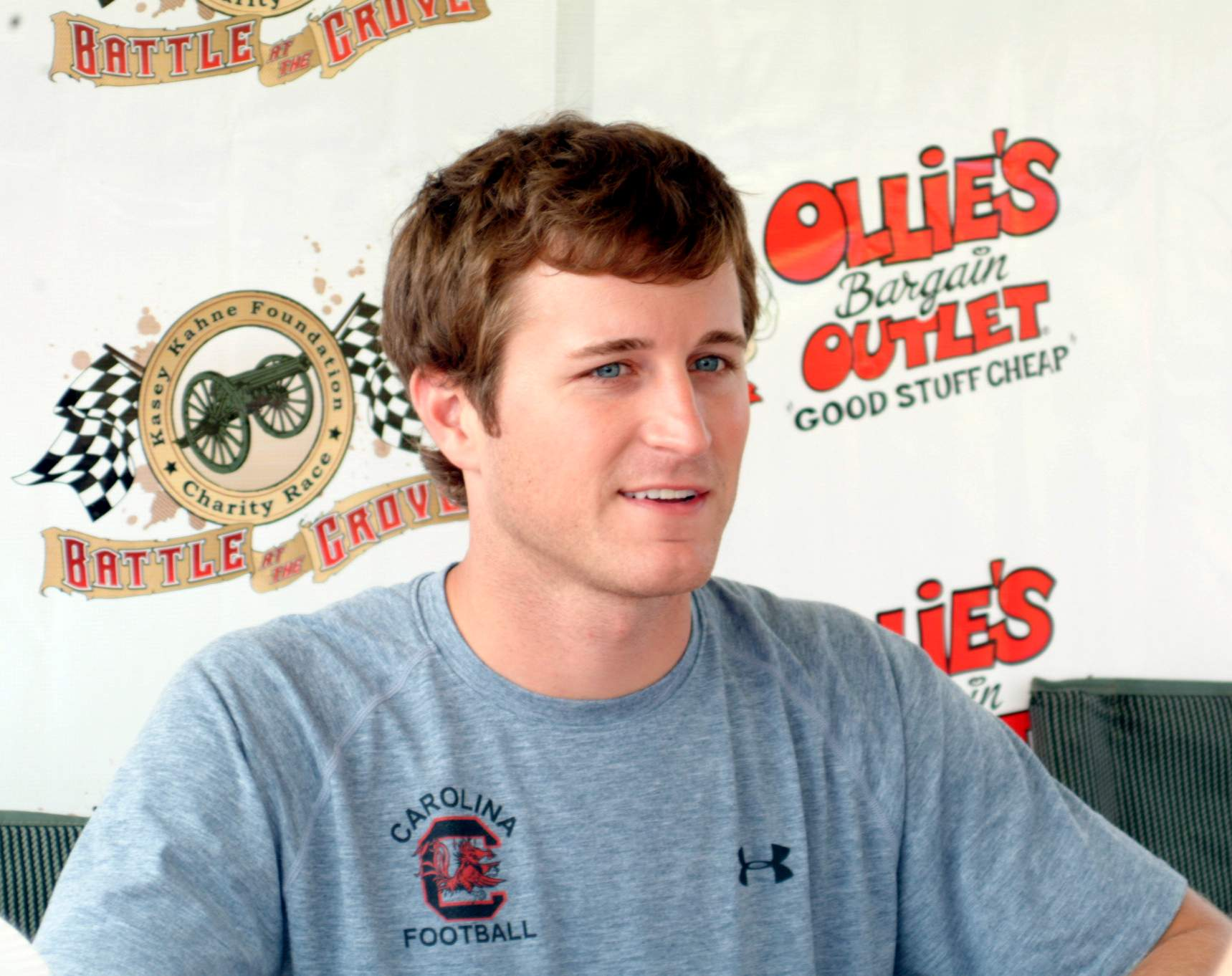
Kasey Kahne (pictured in 2009) had the eleventh pole position of his career.

Three practice sessions were held before the Sunday race; one on Friday and two on Saturday. The first session lasted 90 minutes, the second, and third sessions ran for 50 minutes. In the first practice session, Kahne was fastest with a time of 30.417 seconds; Johnson was second and Elliott Sadler third. Brian Vickers took fourth position, and Scott Riggs placed fifth. Kurt Busch, Gordon, Kyle Busch, Hamlin and Martin Truex Jr. rounded out the session's top ten drivers. Carl Long crashed into the outside wall and switched to a back-up car.

Forty-seven cars were entered in the qualifier on Friday afternoon; according to NASCAR's qualifying procedure forty-three were allowed to race. Kahne clinched his fifth pole position of the season, and the eleventh of his career, with a time of 30.273 seconds. He was joined on the grid's front row by Riggs, his Evernham Motorsports teammate. Johnson qualified third, his Hendrick Motorsports teammate Vickers fourth, and J. J. Yeley fifth. Clint Bowyer, Kurt Busch, Kenseth, Sadler and Burton rounded out the top ten qualifiers. Gordon, a Chase for the Nextel Cup driver, qualified eleventh, and Earnhardt recorded the twelfth fastest lap. The four drivers that failed to qualify were Scott Wimmer, Kevin Lepage, Chad Blount and Long (who hit the turn two outside wall after he spun on his first qualifying lap). After the qualifier, Kahne said, "I feel like I got just about everything out of it. I could have used more race track off turn four, but it was turning so good you didn't really have to."

On Saturday morning Greg Biffle was fastest in the second practice session with a lap of 30.994 seconds, ahead of Casey Mears and Bowyer. Johnson was fourth-fastest; Kurt Busch was fifth and Kahne sixth. Carl Edwards, Vickers, Harvick and Kyle Busch followed in the top ten. Of the other drivers in the Chase, Hamlin was twelfth-fastest and Burton set the thirteenth-fastest time. Later that day, Johnson paced the final practice session with a time of 31.240 seconds; Vickers was second and Reed Sorenson third. Kahne was fourth-fastest, ahead of Burton and Kurt Busch. Bowyer was seventh-fastest, Biffle eighth, Sadler ninth and Harvick tenth. Other chase drivers included Martin in twelfth, Kyle Busch seventeenth and Kenseth twenty-sixth.

=== Qualifying results ===
| Grid | Car | Driver | Team | Manufacturer | Time | Speed |
|---|---|---|---|---|---|---|
| 1 | 9 | Kasey Kahne | Evernham Motorsports | Dodge | 30.273 | 178.377 |
| 2 | 10 | Scott Riggs | Evernham Motorsports | Dodge | 30.348 | 177.936 |
| 3 | 48 | Jimmie Johnson | Hendrick Motorsports | Chevrolet | 30.528 | 176.887 |
| 4 | 25 | Brian Vickers | Hendrick Motorsports | Chevrolet | 30.535 | 176.846 |
| 5 | 18 | J. J. Yeley | Joe Gibbs Racing | Chevrolet | 38.543 | 176.800 |
| 6 | 7 | Clint Bowyer | Richard Childress Racing | Chevrolet | 30.548 | 176.771 |
| 7 | 2 | Kurt Busch | Penske Racing South | Dodge | 30.622 | 176.344 |
| 8 | 17 | Matt Kenseth | Roush Racing | Ford | 30.651 | 176.177 |
| 9 | 19 | Elliott Sadler | Evernham Motorsports | Dodge | 30.658 | 176.137 |
| 10 | 31 | Jeff Burton | Richard Childress Racing | Chevrolet | 30.678 | 176.022 |
| 11 | 24 | Jeff Gordon | Hendrick Motorsports | Chevrolet | 30.692 | 175.942 |
| 12 | 8 | Dale Earnhardt Jr. | Dale Earnhardt, Inc. | Chevrolet | 30.696 | 175.919 |
| 13 | 5 | Kyle Busch | Hendrick Motorsports | Chevrolet | 30.764 | 175.530 |
| 14 | 29 | Kevin Harvick | Richard Childress Racing | Chevrolet | 30.803 | 175.308 |
| 15 | 12 | Ryan Newman | Penske Racing South | Dodge | 30.809 | 175.273 |
| 16 | 43 | Bobby Labonte | Petty Enterprises | Dodge | 30.823 | 175.194 |
| 17 | 22 | Dave Blaney | Bill Davis Racing | Dodge | 30.839 | 175.103 |
| 18 | 01 | Joe Nemechek | Ginn Racing | Chevrolet | 30.864 | 174.961 |
| 19 | 6 | Mark Martin | Roush Racing | Ford | 30.897 | 174.774 |
| 20 | 38 | David Gilliland | Robert Yates Racing | Ford | 30.904 | 174.735 |
| 21 | 20 | Tony Stewart | Joe Gibbs Racing | Chevrolet | 30.905 | 174.729 |
| 22 | 06 | Todd Kluever | Roush Racing | Ford | 30.938 | 174.543 |
| 23 | 1 | Martin Truex Jr. | Dale Earnhardt, Inc. | Chevrolet | 30.941 | 174.526 |
| 24 | 45 | Kyle Petty | Petty Enterprises | Dodge | 30.957 | 174.436 |
| 25 | 11 | Denny Hamlin | Joe Gibbs Racing | Chevrolet | 30.965 | 174.390 |
| 26 | 41 | Reed Sorenson | Chip Ganassi Racing | Dodge | 30.987 | 174.267 |
| 27 | 99 | Carl Edwards | Roush Racing | Ford | 31.005 | 174.165 |
| 28 | 14 | Sterling Marlin | MB2 Motorsports | Chevrolet | 31.019 | 174.087 |
| 29 | 16 | Greg Biffle | Roush Racing | Ford | 31.031 | 174.020 |
| 30 | 44 | Terry Labonte | Hendrick Motorsports | Chevrolet | 31.073 | 173.784 |
| 31 | 66 | Jeff Green | Haas CNC Racing | Chevrolet | 31.095 | 173.661 |
| 32 | 88 | Dale Jarrett | Robert Yates Racing | Ford | 31.096 | 173.656 |
| 33 | 42 | Casey Mears | Chip Ganassi Racing | Dodge | 31.098 | 173.645 |
| 34 | 61 | Chad Chaffin | Front Row Motorsports | Dodge | 31.099 | 173.639 |
| 35 | 55 | Michael Waltrip | Waltrip-Jasper Racing | Dodge | 31.129 | 173.472 |
| 36 | 21 | Ken Schrader | Wood Brothers Racing | Ford | 31.140 | 173.410 |
| 37 | 32 | Travis Kvapil | PPI Motorsports | Chevrolet | 31.159 | 173.305 |
| 38 | 96 | Tony Raines | Hall of Fame Racing | Chevrolet | 31.207 | 173.038 |
| 39 | 37 | Bill Elliott | R&J Racing | Dodge | 31.214 | 172.999 |
| 40 | 40 | David Stremme | Chip Ganassi Racing | Dodge | 31.309 | 172.474 |
| 41 | 26 | Jamie McMurray | Roush Racing | Ford | 31.314 | 172.447 |
| 42 | 7 | Robby Gordon | Robby Gordon Motorsports | Chevrolet | 31.320 | 172.414 |
| 43 | 78 | Kenny Wallace | Furniture Row Racing | Chevrolet | 31.306 | 172.491 |
Failed to qualify
| 44 | 4 | Scott Wimmer | Morgan–McClure Motorsports | Chevrolet | 31.389 | 172.035 |
| 45 | 49 | Kevin Lepage | BAM Racing | Dodge | 31.650 | 170.616 |
| 46 | 34 | Chad Blount | Front Row Motorsports | Chevrolet | 31.701 | 170.345 |
| 47 | 46 | Carl Long | Cupp Motorsports | Dodge | – | – |

== Race ==
Live television coverage of the race began at 1:31 p.m. Eastern Standard Time in the United States on NBC. Around the start of the race, weather conditions were warm and sunny with an air temperature of 90 °F (32 °C). Cole Cochran, of Kansas City Raceway Ministries, began pre-race ceremonies with an invocation. Country music group Heartland performed the national anthem, and three-time Olympic gold medalist Jackie Joyner-Kersee and comic actor George Lopez commanded the drivers to start their engines. No driver moved to the rear of the field.

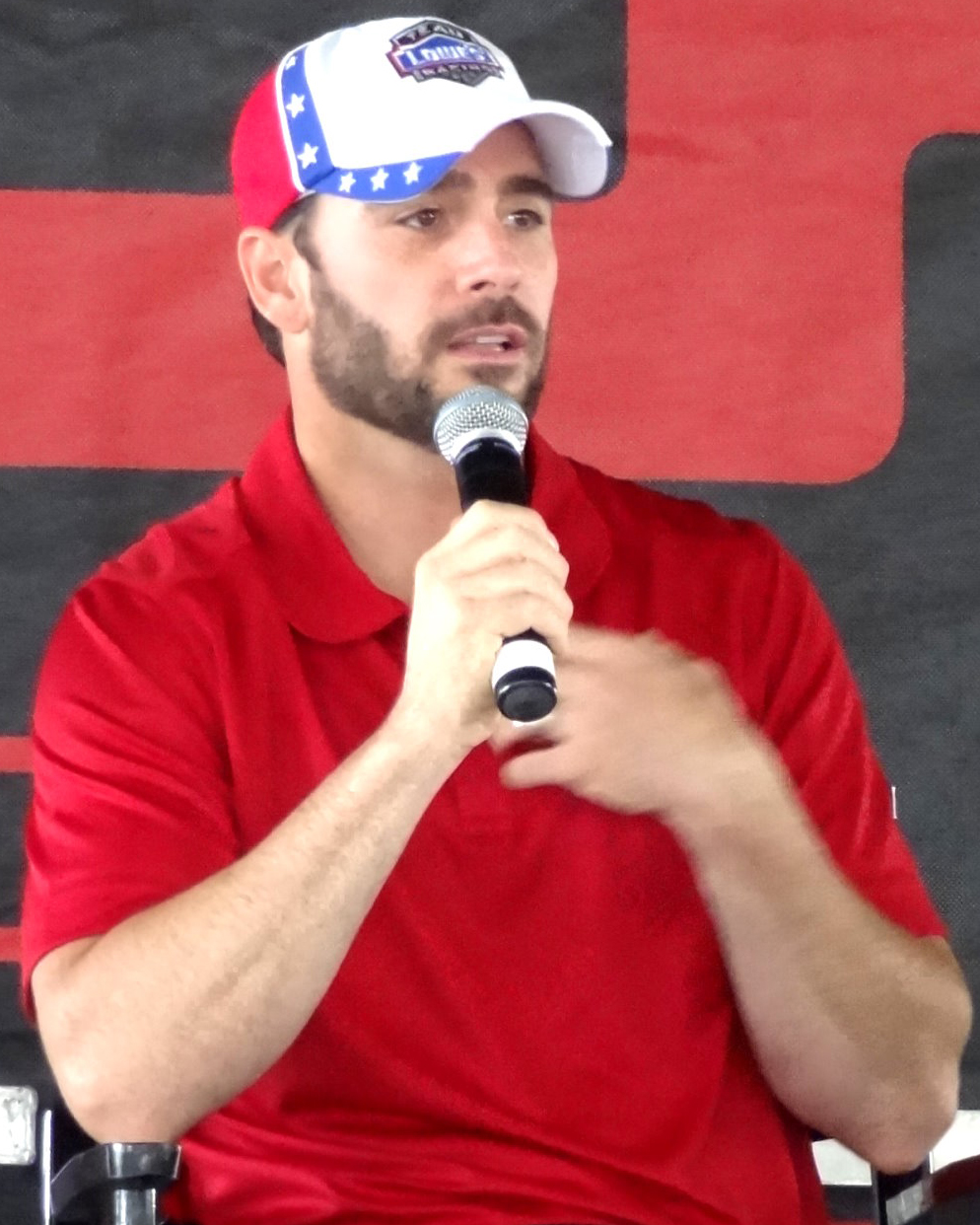
Jimmie Johnson (pictured in 2011) led the race for 105 laps, more than any other driver.

The race started at 2:22 p.m. Kahne maintained his pole position advantage, and led the first lap. Kenseth moved in front of Bowyer for fifth position on the third lap, and passed Vickers for fourth place four laps later. The first caution of the race was prompted on lap ten when Robby Gordon spun after leaving turn four but avoided damaging his car. During the caution, most of the field (including Kahne) made pit stops. Jamie McMurray ran into the grass near the pit road entry at turn four after contact with Sadler. Joe Nemechek and Riggs made contact on pit road which resulted in Nemechek spinning and hit the wall with his front-end. Ryan Newman chose not to pit and led the field at the lap-14 restart. Shortly afterward, he was passed by Johnson for the first position. Newman experienced oversteer one lap later in front of the leading drivers, and went up the track before he spun in turn four, which triggered the second caution. Johnson led at the lap-19 restart, followed by Kahne and Riggs. That lap, the third caution was issued when Sorenson's tire went down and had oversteer, causing him to hit the wall between turns three and four.

Johnson maintained the first position at the lap-25 restart; he was followed by Kahne. Riggs moved ahead of teammate Kahne for second on the following lap. On lap 28, Johnson was passed by Riggs for the lead. Bowyer moved up into second place after he passed Johnson on lap 32, and took the lead from Riggs before crossing the start-finish line at the start of the 35th lap, before Riggs reclaimed the position shortly afterward. Bowyer retook the first position two laps later, and pulled away from the rest of the field. After starting from twelfth, Earnhardt had moved up to third position by lap 45. Johnson lost sixth position after he was overtaken by Kyle Busch on lap 48. Riggs fell to fifth place when Kyle Busch and Johnson passed him. On lap 59, debris was spotted on the backstretch, which caused the fourth caution. The leaders, including Bowyer, made pit stops for tires and adjustments under caution. Earnhardt led the field back up to speed on the lap-64 restart. Bowyer passed teammate Burton for fourth one lap later. After he drove up the track, David Gilliland spun while leaving turn four but avoided hitting the wall, causing the fifth caution to be shown on lap 68.

Earnhardt maintained the first position at the lap-73 restart, followed by Kyle Busch and Johnson. Bowyer was passed by Kahne for fourth place three laps later. Kyle Busch moved in front of Earnhardt for the lead heading into the first turn on the 80th lap, and started to pull away from the field. Earnhardt reported his car had smoke emitting out of his cockpit on lap 93, but later reported the problem had stopped. The gap between Kyle Busch and Earnhardt had reduced to 0.612 seconds by lap 100, however he increased the gap back to 1.694 seconds by the 110th lap. Green-flag pit stops began on lap 121 when Harvick stopped for four tires and car adjustments; Kenseth and teammate Biffle made their pit stops one lap later. Kyle Busch made his pit stop on lap 126; Johnson took over the lead for one lap before his pit stop on the following lap, handing it to Newman. After the pit stops, Kyle Busch regained the lead. McMurray spun and hit the turn two outside wall on lap 131, which caused the sixth caution to be shown. During the caution, some drivers elected to make pit stops.

Kyle Busch remained the leader at the lap-137 restart, followed by Earnhardt, Bowyer, Johnson and Tony Stewart. Johnson lost fourth position when he was passed by Stewart on lap 141, while Bowyer moved ahead of Earnhardt for second on the following lap. Earnhardt had a hole in the center his car's front valance by lap 142 which was caused by running over debris beforehand. On lap 145, Kenseth spun off turn four which caused Sadler to spin in avoidance, triggering the seventh caution. During the caution, the leading drivers (including Kyle Busch), made pit stops. Earnhardt had his car's damage repaired, while Johnson, Kyle Busch and Burton had new tires fitted. Bowyer led the field at the lap-150 restart. The eighth caution was prompted two laps later when Hamlin lost control of his car and drifted up the track at turn four, which caused him to make light contact with the wall and spin. The race restarted on lap 157 with Bowyer leading teammate Burton. Bowyer drove to the side of the track and allowed Burton to lead. Burton ceded the first position back to Bowyer on the next lap.

Burton fell to third when he passed by Johnson on lap 159 who started to draw near Bowyer. Kyle Busch moved ahead of Burton for third on the following lap. Johnson reclaimed the lead from Burton on the 166th lap. Seven laps later, Bowyer had oversteer in the third turn which caused him to heavy contact with the wall and spun while attempting to get ahead of Riggs, triggering the ninth caution. Most of the leaders, including Johnson, chose to make pit stops. Johnson had an air pressure adjustment after reporting his car had oversteer, and Kyle Busch had four tires fitted and a chassis adjustment to increase the grip available. Edwards elected to install two tires and took over the lead for the lap-177 restart, followed by Stewart. Kyle Busch temporarily moved in front of Stewart for second, but Stewart retook the position because Kyle Busch slid up the track. He took second from Stewart on the following lap with assistance from teammate Johnson. On lap 180, Johnson moved back into the first position after he passed Kyle Busch and Edwards. Newman spun in turn two on lap 181 but avoided damage to his car, prompting the tenth caution.

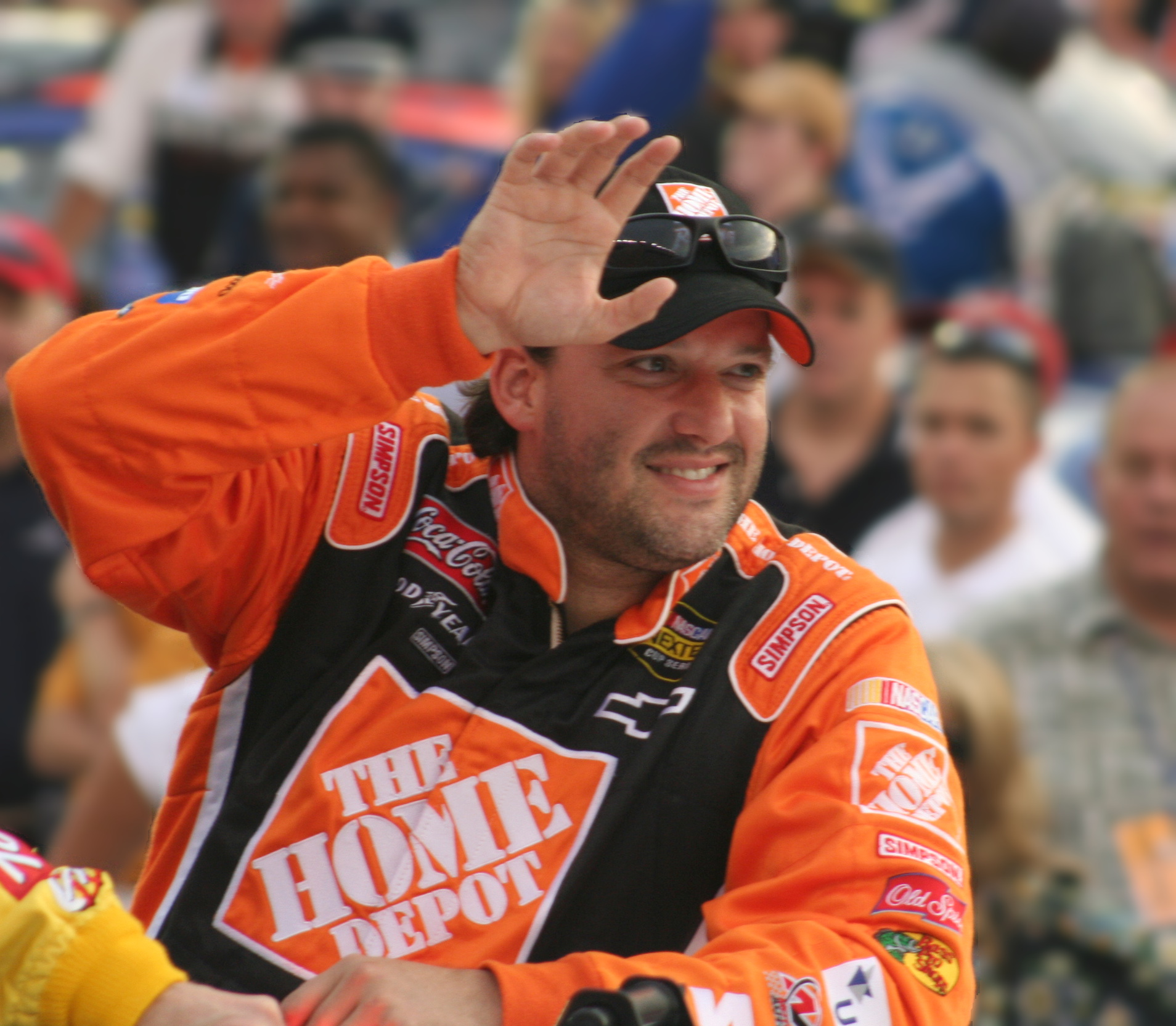
Tony Stewart (pictured in 2007) won the race despite running out of fuel on the final lap.

Johnson remained the leader at the lap-186 restart. Edwards fell to fifth by lap 189 after Kyle Busch, Stewart and Biffle overtook him. The eleventh (and final) caution was necessitated on lap 195 when David Stremme went up the track and hit the turn two wall; Yeley spun shortly afterward and hit the outside wall with his rear-end. All of the leaders elected to make pit stops under caution. Kyle Busch was observed speeding, and was required to drop to the end of the nearest longest line. Johnson led the field at the lap-200 restart, followed by Biffle. On the same lap, Biffle got ahead of Johnson to take over the first position. Three laps later, Johnson retook the lead from Biffle. Earnhardt experienced a large amount of oversteer on lap 205; he regained control of his car and dropped to seventh. Hamlin drove to pit road for an unscheduled pit stop on lap 213 to rectify a vibration; he also had a chassis change and four new tires. Fuel became the teams' primary concern by lap 220 as most drivers did not have enough fuel to reach the race's conclusion. Biffle was passed by Burton for second ten laps later.

Gordon slowed on lap 239 with a broken fuel-pump and stalled on the backstretch. His teammate Terry Labonte pushed Gordon back to his pit stall. Johnson had a five-second lead by lap 242. The second round of green-flag pit stops commenced on lap 249 when Biffle made a pit stop for four tires and fuel, and Burton made a similar pit stop nine laps later. Stewart and Edwards avoided making contact while battling for second position on the 259th lap. Kahne spun while entering pit road and stalled after he ran out of fuel on lap 262; a caution was not needed. Johnson slowed to avoid a collision but missed entering pit road and was required to take another lap at racing speed. After taking his pit stop on the next lap, Johnson was observed exceeding the speed limit upon leaving pit road. After the pit stops, Stewart took over the lead. Stewart reduced his speed on the final lap as he ran out of fuel after leaving turn two; he placed his car into neutral gear and avoided the use of his brakes by lifting early. Second place driver Mears also ran out of fuel when he reached the final turn, allowing Stewart to win the race. Martin finished third, Dale Jarrett took fourth, and Burton fifth. Edwards, Kyle Busch, Vickers, Bowyer and Earnhardt rounded out the top ten finishers. The race had a total of eleven cautions and twenty lead changes by thirteen different drivers. Johnson led five times for a total of 105 laps, more than any other competitor. Stewart led once for a total of five laps.

=== Post-race comments ===
Stewart appeared in victory lane to celebrate his third win of the season in front of the crowd; the win earned him $346,361. Stewart said it was not performance but strategy by his crew chief Greg Zipadelli that helped him to win the race: "It's not typically the way race-car drivers like to win races by any means. But in this business, you take them any way you can get them." Second-place finisher Mears said: "Donnie (crew chief Donnie Wingo) made a good call at the beginning of the last run. He told me to go ahead and save fuel in case we go green the rest of the way and that's what happened." Martin, who finished third, stated: "Everybody tried to make it. But a lot of them didn't. We put a little bit of gas in the bank, and it was a great strategy based on not having the sheer speed to get up there and race with the leaders."

Gordon was disappointed not to finish the race: "We are just going to have to fight really hard. We put out a great fight today. We really came up through there." Burton revealed that he was afraid he would not finish in the top ten finishing positions, but praised his team for the way he ran the race. Johnson was upset over his speeding penalty: "I was just trying to get off and get on and get back in the race, and I got a speeding violation. I wasn’t doing anything differently.” He also said he disliked missing an opportunity to score more points and stated he needed more luck. Bowyer (who led 43 laps) admitted that he was a fault for his lap-173 crash, saying he was trying very hard to win the race. Riggs said he was attempting to give Bowyer more room, and acknowledged that Bowyer was unhappy. Earnhardt stated he was not pleased with his tenth-place finish, but was happy to run with the leaders despite the problems with his car: "It was a good day – a good car. And great pit stops all day. Those guys are really on their game. I am so proud of the effort of my guys. We were better than a 10th-place car and they deserve to finish in the top-three, but the scoreboard doesn't always show how good your team is."

The result kept Burton in the lead of the Drivers' Championship with 5,511 points, ahead of Hamlin on 5,442. Martin moved into third with 5,441, fourteen points ahead of Kenseth who fell to fourth. Harvick remained in fifth, while Gordon fell four positions to sixth. Earnhardt, Johnson, Kyle Busch and Kahne rounded out the top ten. In the Manufacturers' Championship, Chevrolet maintained the lead with 222 points. Ford remained in second with 175, one point ahead of Dodge. The race took three hours, seventeen minutes and twenty-two seconds to complete, and the margin of victory was 12.422 seconds.

=== Race results ===
| Pos | Grid | Car | Driver | Team | Manufacturer | Laps run | Points |
|---|---|---|---|---|---|---|---|
| 1 | 21 | 20 | Tony Stewart | Joe Gibbs Racing | Chevrolet | 267 | 185^{1} |
| 2 | 33 | 42 | Casey Mears | Chip Ganassi Racing | Dodge | 267 | 170 |
| 3 | 19 | 6 | Mark Martin | Roush Racing | Ford | 267 | 165 |
| 4 | 32 | 88 | Dale Jarrett | Robert Yates Racing | Ford | 267 | 160 |
| 5 | 10 | 31 | Jeff Burton | Richard Childress Racing | Chevrolet | 267 | 160^{1} |
| 6 | 27 | 99 | Carl Edwards | Roush Racing | Ford | 267 | 155^{1} |
| 7 | 13 | 5 | Kyle Busch | Hendrick Motorsports | Chevrolet | 267 | 151^{1} |
| 8 | 4 | 25 | Brian Vickers | Hendrick Motorsports | Chevrolet | 267 | 142 |
| 9 | 6 | 07 | Clint Bowyer | Richard Childress Racing | Chevrolet | 267 | 142^{1} |
| 10 | 12 | 8 | Dale Earnhardt Jr. | Dale Earnhardt, Inc. | Chevrolet | 267 | 139^{1} |
| 11 | 23 | 1 | Martin Truex Jr | Dale Earnhardt, Inc. | Chevrolet | 267 | 130 |
| 12 | 29 | 16 | Greg Biffle | Roush Racing | Ford | 267 | 132^{1} |
| 13 | 36 | 21 | Ken Schrader | Wood Brothers Racing | Ford | 267 | 124 |
| 14 | 3 | 48 | Jimmie Johnson | Hendrick Motorsports | Chevrolet | 267 | 131^{2} |
| 15 | 14 | 29 | Kevin Harvick | Richard Childress Racing | Chevrolet | 266 | 118 |
| 16 | 39 | 37 | Bill Elliott | R&J Racing | Dodge | 266 | 115 |
| 17 | 16 | 43 | Bobby Labonte | Petty Enterprises | Dodge | 266 | 112 |
| 18 | 25 | 11 | Denny Hamlin | Joe Gibbs Racing | Chevrolet | 266 | 109 |
| 19 | 37 | 32 | Travis Kvapil | PPI Motorsports | Chevrolet | 266 | 111^{1} |
| 20 | 28 | 14 | Sterling Marlin | MB2 Motorsports | Chevrolet | 266 | 108^{1} |
| 21 | 17 | 22 | Dave Blaney | Bill Davis Racing | Dodge | 266 | 100 |
| 22 | 20 | 38 | David Gilliland | Robert Yates Racing | Ford | 266 | 97 |
| 23 | 8 | 17 | Matt Kenseth | Roush Racing | Ford | 266 | 94 |
| 24 | 15 | 12 | Ryan Newman | Penske Racing South | Dodge | 266 | 96^{1} |
| 25 | 7 | 2 | Kurt Busch | Penske Racing South | Dodge | 265 | 88 |
| 26 | 40 | 40 | David Stremme | Chip Ganassi Racing | Dodge | 265 | 85 |
| 27 | 18 | 01 | Joe Nemechek | Ginn Racing | Chevrolet | 265 | 82 |
| 28 | 38 | 96 | Tony Raines | Hall of Fame Racing | Chevrolet | 265 | 79 |
| 29 | 24 | 45 | Kyle Petty | Petty Enterprises | Dodge | 265 | 76 |
| 30 | 31 | 66 | Jeff Green | Haas CNC Racing | Chevrolet | 264 | 73 |
| 31 | 43 | 78 | Kenny Wallace | Furniture Row Racing | Chevrolet | 264 | 70 |
| 32 | 22 | 06 | Todd Kluever | Roush Racing | Ford | 264 | 67 |
| 33 | 1 | 9 | Kasey Kahne | Evernham Motorsports | Dodge | 264 | 69^{1} |
| 34 | 2 | 10 | Scott Riggs | Evernham Motorsports | Dodge | 263 | 66^{1} |
| 35 | 35 | 55 | Michael Waltrip | Waltrip-Jasper Racing | Dodge | 263 | 58 |
| 36 | 42 | 7 | Robby Gordon | Robby Gordon Motorsports | Chevrolet | 263 | 55 |
| 37 | 34 | 61 | Chad Chaffin | Front Row Motorsports | Dodge | 261 | 52 |
| 38 | 30 | 44 | Terry Labonte | Hendrick Motorsports | Chevrolet | 253 | 49 |
| 39 | 11 | 24 | Jeff Gordon | Hendrick Motorsports | Chevrolet | 238 | 46 |
| 40 | 9 | 19 | Elliott Sadler | Evernham Motorsports | Dodge | 228 | 43 |
| 41 | 5 | 18 | J. J. Yeley | Joe Gibbs Racing | Chevrolet | 194 | 40 |
| 42 | 41 | 26 | Jamie McMurray | Roush Racing | Ford | 128 | 37 |
| 43 | 26 | 41 | Reed Sorenson | Chip Ganassi Racing | Dodge | 18 | 34 |
^{1} Includes five bonus points for leading a lap^{2} Includes ten bonus points for leading the most laps

== Standings after the race ==
Drivers' Championship standings
| Pos | +/– | Driver | Points |
|---|---|---|---|
| 1 | | Jeff Burton | 5,511 |
| 2 | 2 | Denny Hamlin | 5,442 (−69) |
| 3 | 3 | Mark Martin | 5,441 (−70) |
| 4 | 1 | Matt Kenseth | 5,427 (−84) |
| 5 | | Kevin Harvick | 5,415 (−96) |
| 6 | 3 | Jeff Gordon | 5,391 (−120) |
| 7 | | Dale Earnhardt Jr. | 5,388 (−123) |
| 8 | | Jimmie Johnson | 5,346 (−165) |
| 9 | 1 | Kyle Busch | 5,278 (−233) |
| 10 | 1 | Kasey Kahne | 5,238 (−273) |

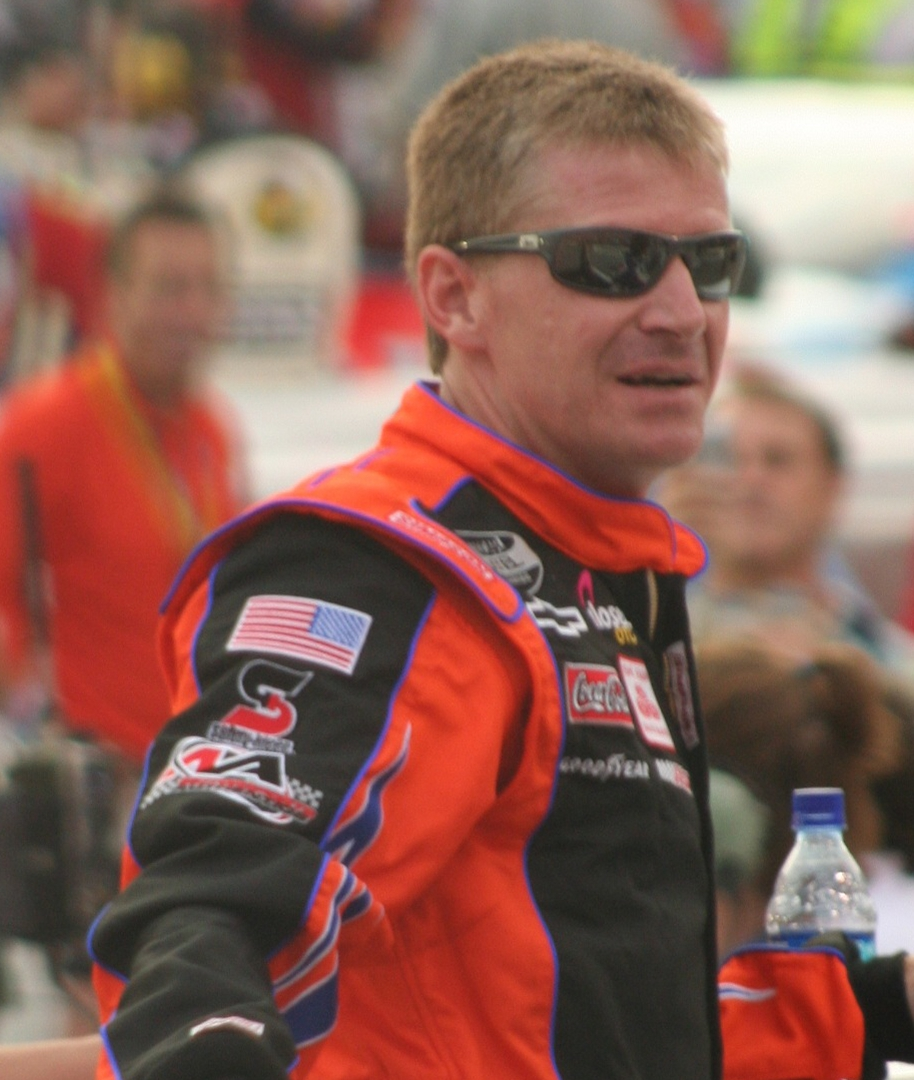
Jeff Burton (pictured in 2007) remained the Driver's Championship leader after the race.

Manufacturers' Championship standings
| Pos | +/– | Manufacturer | Points |
|---|---|---|---|
| 1 | | Chevrolet | 222 |
| 2 | | Ford | 175 (−47) |
| 3 | | Dodge | 174 (−48) |

- Note: Only the top ten positions are included for the driver standings. These drivers qualified for the Chase for the Nextel Cup.

| Previous race: 2006 Dover 400 | Nextel Cup Series; 2006 season | Next race: 2006 UAW-Ford 500 |
