= Ralph Braun =

American businessman

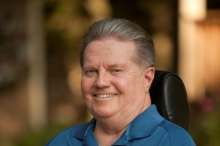
- Born: December 18, 1940; Winamac, Indiana
- Died: February 8, 2013 (aged 72); Pulaski County, Indiana
- Occupations: Founder and CEO of the Braun Corporation
- Spouse: Melody Braun
- Children: 5
- Website: https://www.braunability.com/us/en.html

Ralph William Braun (December 18, 1940 – February 8, 2013) was the founder and CEO of the Braun Corporation. He is also known as the "Father of the Mobility Movement" at BraunAbility.

== Early life ==
Braun was born and raised in Winamac, Indiana. When he was six years old, doctors diagnosed him with muscular dystrophy. He started using a wheelchair at the age of 14. At the age of 15, he created a motorized wagon with his father to help him get around. Five years later, Braun created a motorized scooter, which he called the Tri-Wheeler, using various parts from his cousin's farm. Ralph rode the Tri-Wheeler to and from his day job as a Quality Control Manager for a nearby manufacturer. When the facility moved several miles away, he equipped an old mail carrier Jeep with hand controls and a hydraulic tailgate lift, enabling him to drive his Tri-Wheeler in and out of the vehicle unassisted.

In 1970, Dodge introduced the first full-sized, front engine van. Braun retrofitted a Dodge van with a lift and called this new invention the “Lift-A-Way” wheelchair lift. When word spread about this new invention, Braun assembled a team to help fill orders across the nation, all from his parents’ garage. As demand increased, Braun decided to quit his full-time job to focus on his part-time business.

== Career ==
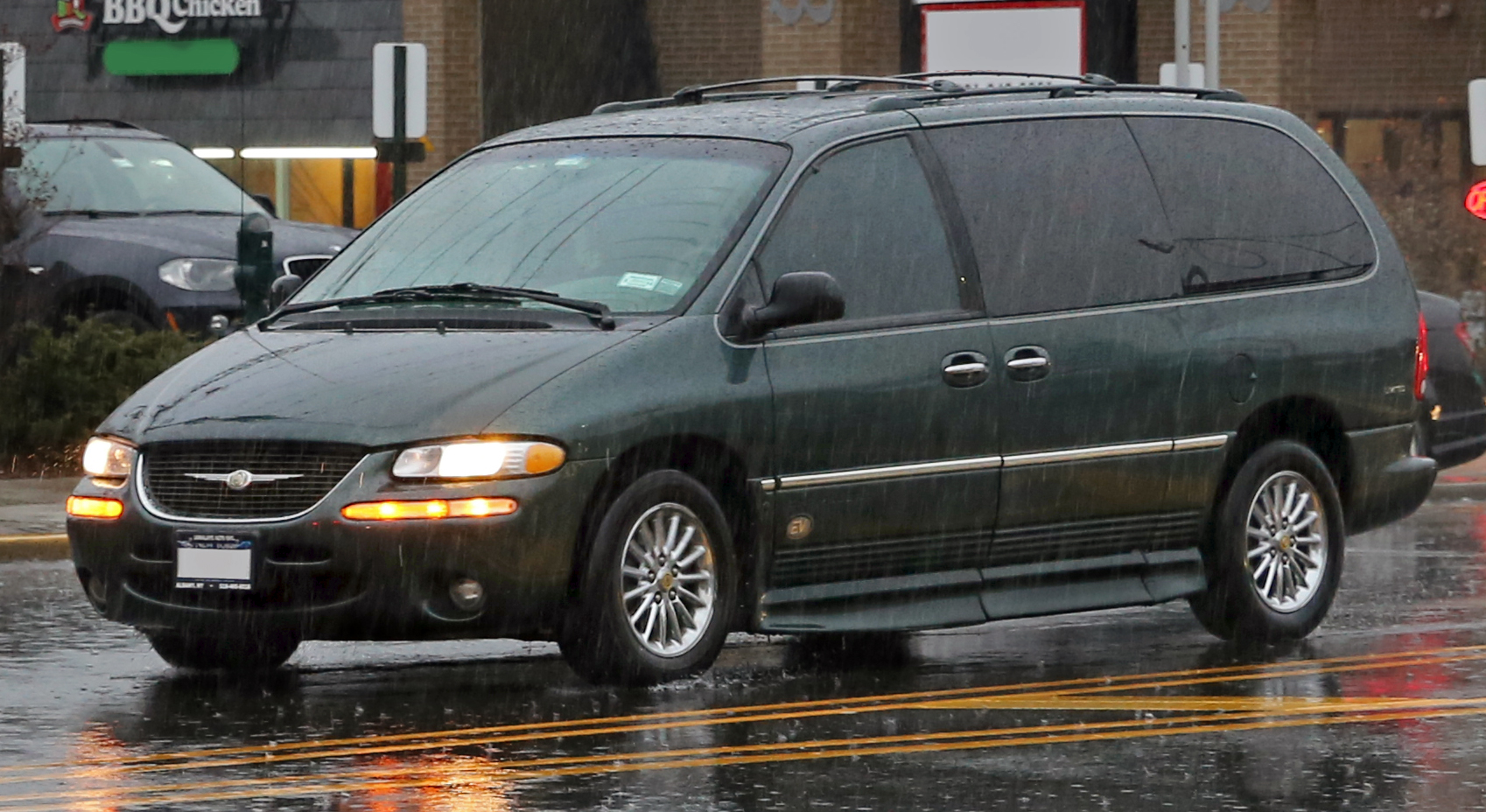
Braun "Entervan" conversion of a 1998-2000 Chrysler Town & Country

Braun started "Save-A-Step" manufacturing in 1963 to build the first motorized scooter, made from "a lawnmower differential, four big wheelbarrow tires, two 6-volt automotive batteries, makeshift wiring and switches I got from the hardware store, a kitchen chair, and a motor from a 1957 Pontiac kid's car that I rescued from a mortician's trash bin". In 1966 Braun created the first wheelchair accessible vehicle, by creating a wheelchair platform lift and hand controls that were added to an old Post Office Jeep. In 1970, Ralph added wheelchair platform lifts to full-sized vans. "Save-A-Step" was incorporated under a new name, The Braun Corporation, in 1972.

In 1991, Braun introduced its first wheelchair accessible minivan, based on the Dodge Caravan and called the Entervan. In 1999, Braun acquired Crow River Industries, a specialized manufacturer of wheelchair platform lifts. In 2005, Braun acquired IMS of Farmington, NM, a specialized manufacturer of Toyota Sienna wheelchair accessible minivans. In 2006, the Braun Corporation adopted the brand name, BraunAbility, for its personal-use products. In 2011, the Braun Corporation acquired partial ownership in AutoAdapt, a European mobility company. In 2011, the Braun Corporation also acquired Viewpoint Mobility, a small Michigan-based company that specializes in the wheelchair accessible minivans with rear entry.

In May 2012, Braun was named a "champion of change" by U.S. President Barack Obama.

== Personal life ==
Braun was a father of five adult children. He ran the Braun Corporation from his hometown of Winamac, Indiana with his wife, Melody until his death in 2013.

Braun and his son Todd were owners of the NASCAR racing team, Braun Racing.

Braun was the grandfather of NASCAR Cup Series driver Justin Haley.

Braun died in Pulaski County, Indiana, on 8 February, 2013 at the age of 72.
