= 2006 NASCAR Nextel Cup Series =

American motorsport season

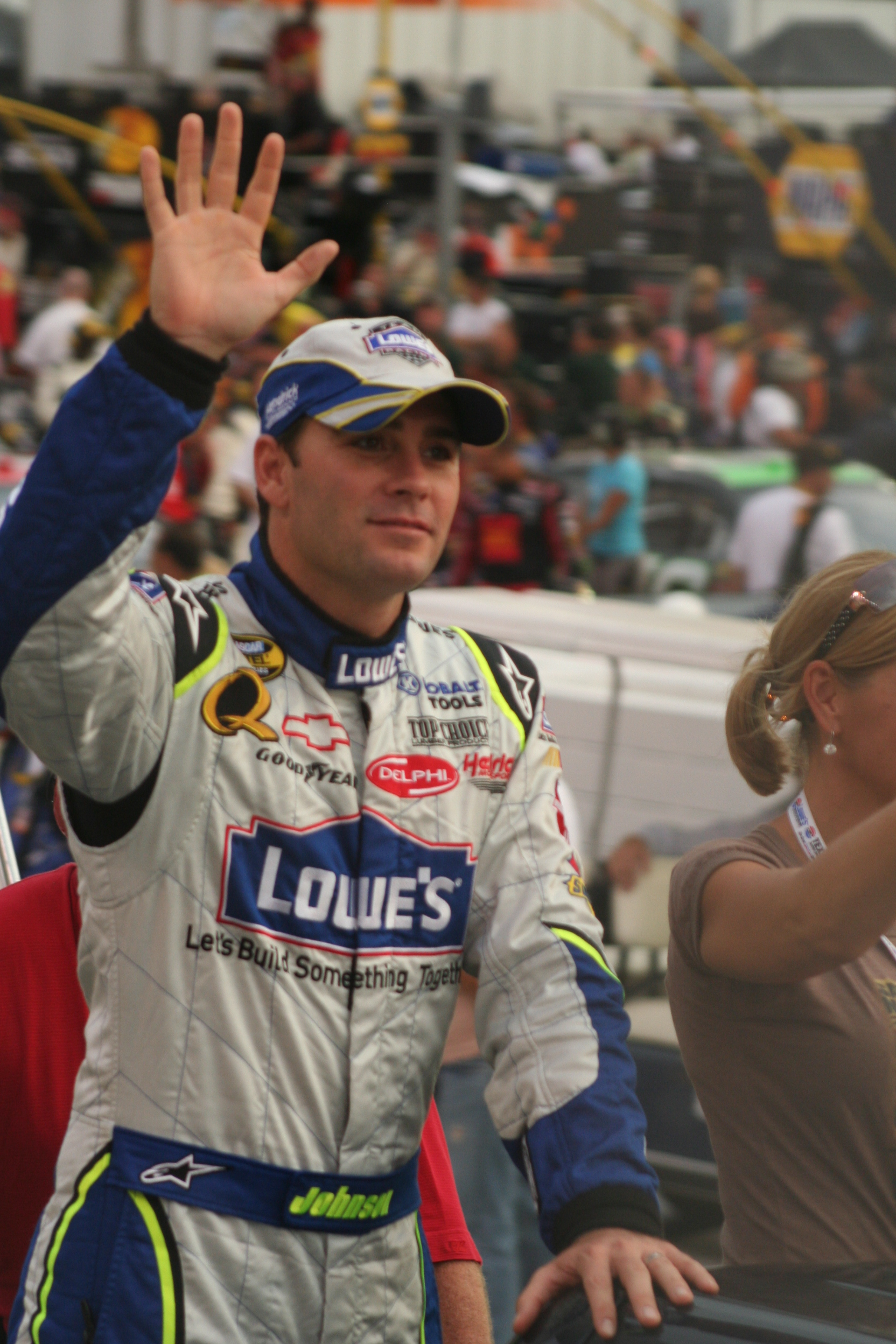
Jimmie Johnson, the 2006 Nextel Cup Series champion. This was the first of his five consecutive titles and seven overall.

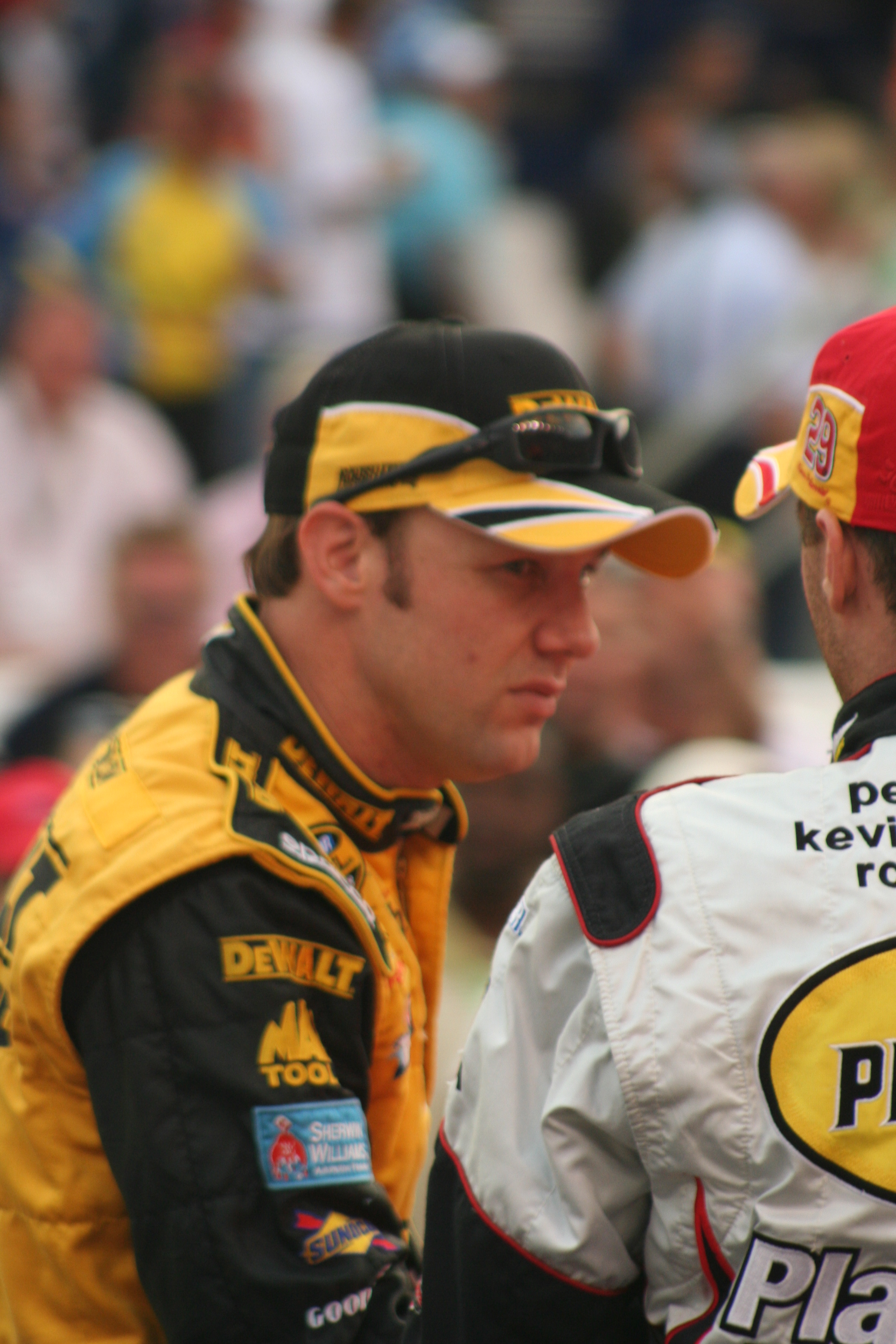
Matt Kenseth finished second behind Johnson by 56 points.

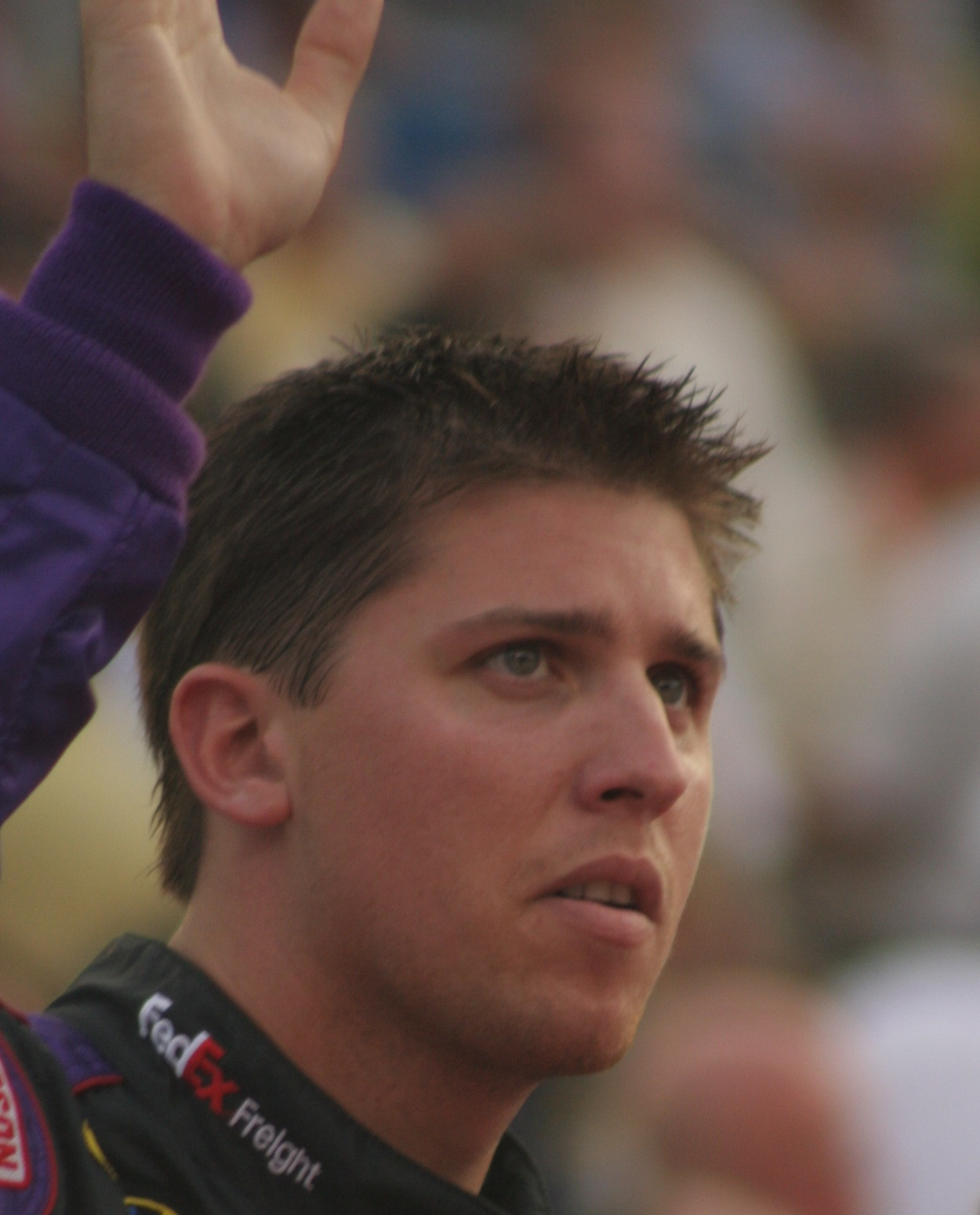
Denny Hamlin finished third in the championship and also won Rookie of the Year.

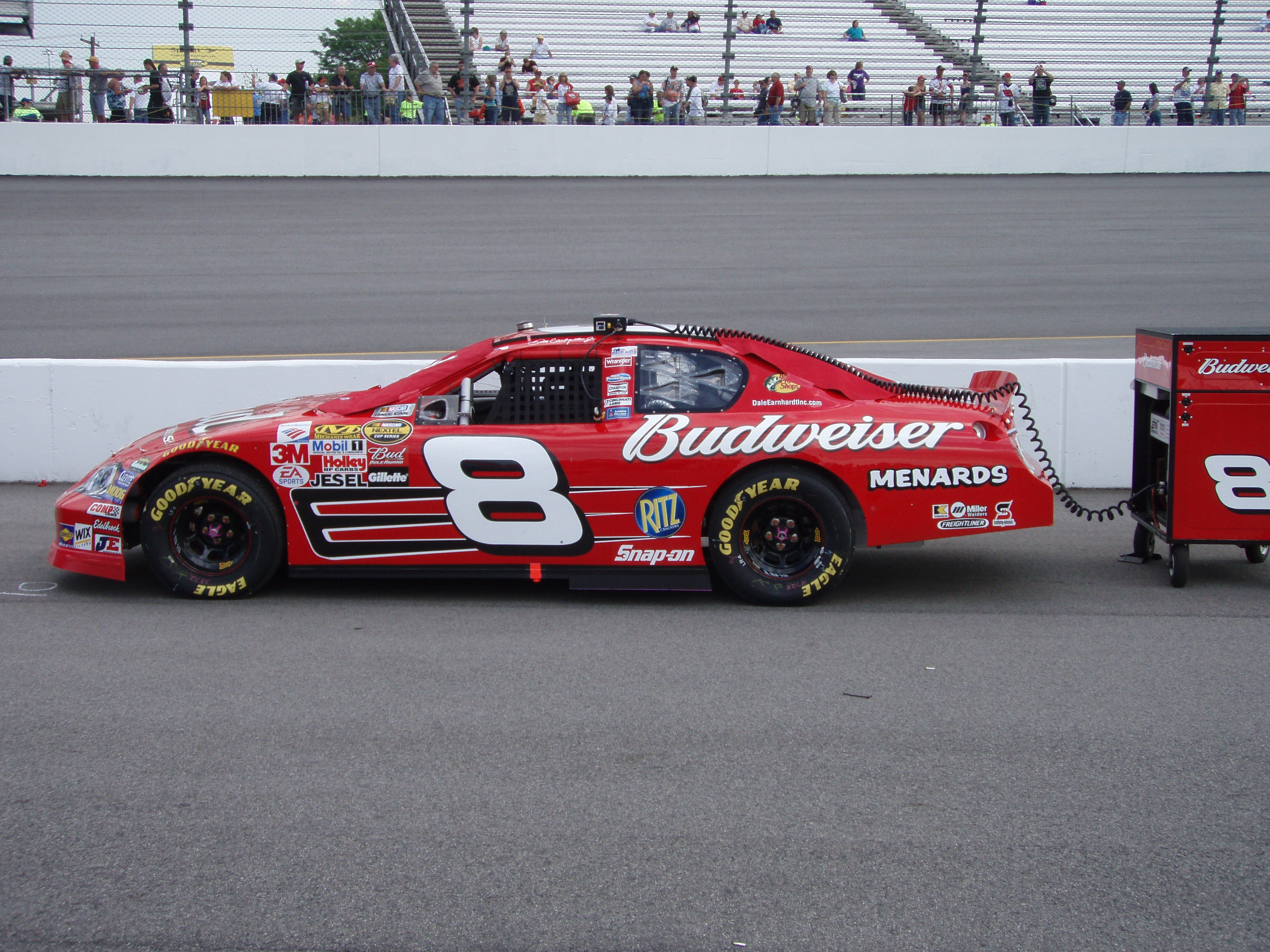
Chevrolet won the Manufacturer's championship with 23 wins.

The 2006 NASCAR Nextel Cup Series was the 58th season of professional stock car racing in the United States and the 35th modern-era NASCAR Cup series season. It was started at Daytona International Speedway on Sunday, February 12 with the Budweiser Shootout and ended on Monday, November 20, with the Ford 400 at Homestead–Miami Speedway. The Chase for the Nextel Cup began with the Sylvania 300 on Sunday, September 17, at New Hampshire International Speedway. This was the last full-time season with the Gen 4 car.

Tony Stewart, driver of the No. 20 Chevrolet for Joe Gibbs Racing, was the defending series champion, but lost out in defending his championship this year, having finished outside of the top 10 in the points standings after the Chevy Rock and Roll 400. He did, however, claim a $1 million (US) bonus as the best finisher outside the Chase for the Nextel Cup drivers, winning three of the ten Chase races. By the end of the season Chevrolet had captured 23 victories, and 270 points to win the NASCAR Manufacturers' Championship over Ford.

The 2006 season was the first for Ford's all-new Fusion, which replaced the Taurus both in NASCAR and in showrooms. Also, a new version of the Chevrolet Monte Carlo, called the Monte Carlo Super Sport (SS for short) debuted on the circuit.

== Teams and drivers ==
=== Complete schedule ===
Manufacturer	Team	No.	Driver(s)	Crew Chief
Chevrolet	Dale Earnhardt, Inc.	1	Martin Truex Jr. (R)	Kevin Manion
Chevrolet	Dale Earnhardt, Inc.	8	Dale Earnhardt Jr.	Tony Eury Jr.
Chevrolet	Furniture Row Racing	78	Kenny Wallace 31	Joe Garone
Chevrolet	Furniture Row Racing	78	Jimmy Spencer 3	Joe Garone
Chevrolet	Furniture Row Racing	78	Travis Kvapil 1	Joe Garone
Chevrolet	Furniture Row Racing	78	Max Papis 1	Joe Garone
Chevrolet	MB2 Motorsports	01	Joe Nemechek	Ryan Pemberton
Chevrolet	MB2 Motorsports	14	Sterling Marlin	Doug Randolph
Chevrolet	Haas CNC Racing	66	Jeff Green	Harold Holly
Chevrolet	Hall of Fame Racing	96	Terry Labonte 7	Phillipe Lopez
Chevrolet	Hall of Fame Racing	96	Tony Raines 29	Phillipe Lopez
Chevrolet	Hendrick Motorsports	5	Kyle Busch	Alan Gustafson
Chevrolet	Hendrick Motorsports	24	Jeff Gordon	Steve Letarte
Chevrolet	Hendrick Motorsports	25	Brian Vickers	Lance McGrew
Chevrolet	Hendrick Motorsports	48	Jimmie Johnson	Chad Knaus
Chevrolet	Joe Gibbs Racing	11	Denny Hamlin (R)	Mike Ford
Chevrolet	Joe Gibbs Racing	18	J. J. Yeley (R)	Steve Addington
Chevrolet	Joe Gibbs Racing	20	Tony Stewart	Greg Zipadelli
Chevrolet	Morgan-McClure Motorsports	4	Scott Wimmer 28	Chris Carrier
Chevrolet	Morgan-McClure Motorsports	4	P. J. Jones 1	Chris Carrier
Chevrolet	Morgan-McClure Motorsports	4	Todd Bodine 3	Chris Carrier
Chevrolet	Morgan-McClure Motorsports	4	Ward Burton 4	Chris Carrier
Chevrolet	PPI Motorsports	32	Travis Kvapil 34	James Ince; Gary Putnam
Chevrolet	PPI Motorsports	32	Ron Fellows 2	James Ince; Gary Putnam
Chevrolet	Richard Childress Racing	07	Clint Bowyer (R)	Gil Martin
Chevrolet	Richard Childress Racing	29	Kevin Harvick	Todd Berrier
Chevrolet	Richard Childress Racing	31	Jeff Burton	Scott Miller
Chevrolet	Robby Gordon Motorsports	7	Robby Gordon	Greg Erwin
Dodge	BAM Racing	49	Brent Sherman (R) 8	Ron Otto
Dodge	BAM Racing	49	Jimmy Spencer 1	Ron Otto
Dodge	BAM Racing	49	Mike Wallace 1	Ron Otto
Dodge	BAM Racing	49	Kevin Lepage 17	Ron Otto
Dodge	BAM Racing	49	Chris Cook 2	Ron Otto
Dodge	BAM Racing	49	Mike Bliss 7	Ron Otto
Dodge	Bill Davis Racing	22	Dave Blaney	Kevin Hamlin
Dodge	Chip Ganassi Racing with Felix Sabates	40	David Stremme (R) 34	Jeff Vandermoss
Dodge	Chip Ganassi Racing with Felix Sabates	40	Scott Pruett 2	Jeff Vandermoss
Dodge	Chip Ganassi Racing with Felix Sabates	41	Reed Sorenson (R)	Jimmy Elledge
Dodge	Chip Ganassi Racing with Felix Sabates	42	Casey Mears	Donnie Wingo
Dodge	Evernham Motorsports	9	Kasey Kahne	Kenny Francis
Dodge	Evernham Motorsports	10	Scott Riggs	Rodney Childers
Dodge	Evernham Motorsports	19	Jeremy Mayfield 21	Chris Andrews
Dodge	Evernham Motorsports	19	Bill Elliott 1	Chris Andrews
Dodge	Evernham Motorsports	19	Elliott Sadler 14	Chris Andrews
Dodge	Penske Racing South	2	Kurt Busch	Roy McCauley
Dodge	Penske Racing South	12	Ryan Newman	Matt Borland
Dodge	Petty Enterprises	43	Bobby Labonte	Todd Parrott 22; Greg Steadman 4 Paul Andrews 10
Dodge	Petty Enterprises	45	Kyle Petty	Paul Andrews 26; Billy Wilburn 10
Dodge	Waltrip-Jasper Racing	55	Michael Waltrip	Derrick Finley
Ford	Robert Yates Racing	38	Elliott Sadler 22	Tommy Baldwin Jr.
Ford	Robert Yates Racing	38	David Gilliland 14	Tommy Baldwin Jr.
Ford	Robert Yates Racing	88	Dale Jarrett	Slugger Labbe
Ford	Roush Racing	6	Mark Martin	Pat Tryson
Ford	Roush Racing	16	Greg Biffle	Doug Richert
Ford	Roush Racing	17	Matt Kenseth	Robbie Reiser
Ford	Roush Racing	26	Jamie McMurray	Jimmy Fennig/Wally Brown
Ford	Roush Racing	99	Carl Edwards	Bob Osborne
Ford	Wood Brothers/JTG Racing	21	Ken Schrader	David Hyder
Chevrolet Dodge Ford	Peak Fitness Racing 9 Front Row Motorsports 27	34	Randy LaJoie 2	Wayne Hatfield
Chevrolet Dodge Ford	Peak Fitness Racing 9 Front Row Motorsports 27	34	Chad Chaffin (R) 11	Wayne Hatfield
Chevrolet Dodge Ford	Peak Fitness Racing 9 Front Row Motorsports 27	34	Chad Blount 7	Wayne Hatfield
Chevrolet Dodge Ford	Peak Fitness Racing 9 Front Row Motorsports 27	34	Carl Long 3	Wayne Hatfield
Chevrolet Dodge Ford	Peak Fitness Racing 9 Front Row Motorsports 27	34	Greg Sacks 2	Wayne Hatfield
Chevrolet Dodge Ford	Peak Fitness Racing 9 Front Row Motorsports 27	34	Mike Skinner 2	Wayne Hatfield
Chevrolet Dodge Ford	Peak Fitness Racing 9 Front Row Motorsports 27	34	Johnny Miller 1	Wayne Hatfield
Chevrolet Dodge Ford	Peak Fitness Racing 9 Front Row Motorsports 27	34	Joey McCarthy 1	Wayne Hatfield
Chevrolet Dodge Ford	Peak Fitness Racing 9 Front Row Motorsports 27	34	Brian Simo 1	Wayne Hatfield
Chevrolet Dodge Ford	Peak Fitness Racing 9 Front Row Motorsports 27	34	Kertus Davis 1	Wayne Hatfield
Chevrolet Dodge Ford	Peak Fitness Racing 9 Front Row Motorsports 27	34	Kevin Lepage 4	Wayne Hatfield
Chevrolet Dodge Ford	Peak Fitness Racing 9 Front Row Motorsports 27	61	Kevin Lepage 13	Greg Conner 15; Mike Steurer 17; Craig Osbourne 4
Chevrolet Dodge Ford	Peak Fitness Racing 9 Front Row Motorsports 27	61	Chad Chaffin (R) 17	Greg Conner 15; Mike Steurer 17; Craig Osbourne 4
Chevrolet Dodge Ford	Peak Fitness Racing 9 Front Row Motorsports 27	61	Brian Simo 1	Greg Conner 15; Mike Steurer 17; Craig Osbourne 4
Chevrolet Dodge Ford	Peak Fitness Racing 9 Front Row Motorsports 27	61	Chad Blount 1	Greg Conner 15; Mike Steurer 17; Craig Osbourne 4
Chevrolet Dodge Ford	Peak Fitness Racing 9 Front Row Motorsports 27	61	Ted Christopher 1	Greg Conner 15; Mike Steurer 17; Craig Osbourne 4
Chevrolet Dodge Ford	Peak Fitness Racing 9 Front Row Motorsports 27	61	Derrike Cope 1	Greg Conner 15; Mike Steurer 17; Craig Osbourne 4
Chevrolet Dodge Ford	Peak Fitness Racing 9 Front Row Motorsports 27	61	Stanton Barrett 1	Greg Conner 15; Mike Steurer 17; Craig Osbourne 4

=== Limited schedule ===
Manufacturer	Team	No.	Driver(s)	Crew Chief	Rounds
Chevrolet	Andy Belmont Racing	59	Andy Belmont	Billy Owen	1
Chevrolet	Braun Racing	71	Jason Leffler	Todd Lohse	1
Chevrolet	CJM Racing	72	Kertus Davis	Doug George	2
Chevrolet	CJM Racing	72	Brent Sherman	Doug George	1
Chevrolet	CJM Racing	72	David Gilliland	Doug George	1
Chevrolet	CJM Racing	72	Dale Quarterley	Doug George	1
Chevrolet	CJM Racing	72	Mike Skinner	Doug George	4
Chevrolet	CJM Racing	72	Brandon Whitt	Doug George	2
Chevrolet	Competitive Edge Motorsports	51	Mike Garvey	Barry Haefele	10
Chevrolet	Cupp Motorsports	46	Carl Long	Stan Hover	4
Chevrolet	Dale Earnhardt, Inc.	15	Paul Menard	Dan Stillman	10
Chevrolet	Haas CNC Racing	70	Johnny Sauter	Bootie Barker	2
Chevrolet	Hendrick Motorsports	44	Terry Labonte	Peter Sospenzo	10
Chevrolet	Kirk Shelmerdine Racing	27	Kirk Shelmerdine	Phil Harris	7
Chevrolet	Kirk Shelmerdine Racing	27	Tom Hubert	Phil Harris	2
Chevrolet	Kirk Shelmerdine Racing	27	Ted Christopher	Phil Harris	3
Chevrolet	Kirk Shelmerdine Racing	27	Mike Skinner	Phil Harris	1
Chevrolet	MB2 Motorsports	36	Bill Elliott	Frank Stoddard	1
Chevrolet	Michael Waltrip Racing	00	Bill Elliott	Larry Carter	5
Chevrolet	Morgan-McClure Motorsports	04	Eric McClure	Danny Gill	1
Chevrolet	Richard Childress Racing	33	Scott Wimmer	Pat Smith	1
Chevrolet	Stanton Barrett Racing	95	Stanton Barrett	Shawn Parker	16
Dodge	Arnold Motorsports	50	Larry Foyt	Buddy Sisco	1
Dodge	Bill Davis Racing	23	Mike Skinner	Ricky Viers	1
Dodge	Bill Davis Racing	23	Bill Lester	Ricky Viers	3
Dodge	Bobby Hamilton Racing	04	Bobby Hamilton Jr.		3
Dodge	Brandon Ash Racing	02	Brandon Ash	Ed Ash	5
Dodge	Chip Ganassi Racing	30	Juan Pablo Montoya	Dan Kolanda 3 Steve Boyer 1	1
Dodge	Rick Ware Racing	30	Stanton Barrett	Dan Kolanda 3 Steve Boyer 1	3
Dodge	Rick Ware Racing	52	Stanton Barrett	Dan Kolanda	1
Dodge	Rick Ware Racing	52	Larry Gunselman	Dan Kolanda	2
Dodge	Rick Ware Racing	52	Steve Portenga	Dan Kolanda	1
Dodge	Rick Ware Racing	52	Donnie Neuenberger	Dan Kolanda	2
Dodge	McGlynn Racing	74	Derrike Cope	Dom Turse	27
Dodge	R&J Racing	37	Chad Blount	Mark Tutor	1
Dodge	R&J Racing	37	Mike Skinner	Mark Tutor	5
Dodge	R&J Racing	37	Carl Long	Mark Tutor	3
Dodge	R&J Racing	37	David Murry	Mark Tutor	1
Dodge	R&J Racing	37	Bill Elliott	Mark Tutor	4
Dodge	Victory Motorsports Faith Motorsports	89	Morgan Shepherd	Doug George	16
Dodge	Victory Motorsports Faith Motorsports	89	Kertus Davis	Doug George	1
Dodge	Team Red Bull	83	Bill Elliott	Ricky Viers	1
Dodge	Team Red Bull	84	A. J. Allmendinger	Ricky Viers	2
Ford	Brent Sherman Racing	04	Brent Sherman		1
Ford	Brewco Motorsports	95	Casey Atwood	Shawn Parker	1
Ford	Hover Motorsports	80	Carl Long	Stan Hover	1
Ford	No Fear Racing	60	Boris Said	Frank Stoddard	4
Ford	No Fear Racing	60	David Ragan	Frank Stoddard	2
Ford	Robert Yates Racing	90	Stephen Leicht	Raymond Fox Jr.	2
Ford	Robert Yates Racing	90	Marc Goossens	Raymond Fox Jr.	1
Ford	Roush Racing	06	Todd Kluever	Frank Stoddard	7
Ford	Roush Racing	06	David Ragan	Frank Stoddard	2
Ford	Sacks Motorsports	13	Greg Sacks		1
Chevrolet Dodge	Front Row Motorsports				
Chevrolet Dodge	Front Row Motorsports	64	Randy LaJoie	Teddy Brown	1
Chevrolet Dodge	Front Row Motorsports	92	Chad Chaffin (R)	Teddy Brown	1
Chevrolet Dodge	Front Row Motorsports	92	Chad Blount	Teddy Brown	6
Chevrolet Dodge	Front Row Motorsports	92	Johnny Miller	Teddy Brown	1
Chevrolet Ford	MBA Racing	00	Hermie Sadler	Micah Horton	17
Chevrolet Dodge Ford	Phoenix Racing	09	Mike Wallace	Marc Reno	6
Chevrolet Dodge Ford	Phoenix Racing	09	Jeremy Mayfield	Marc Reno	2

=== Driver changes for 2006 ===
Several new drivers were in their first stint as regulars on the Nextel Cup circuit in 2006. After winning back-to-back Busch Series championships in 2004 and 2005, Martin Truex Jr. drove the No. 1 Chevrolet for Dale Earnhardt, Inc. (DEI). Vacated by Michael Waltrip, their No. 15 car was driven by rookie Paul Menard and ran a part-time schedule of only seven races.

Waltrip left DEI to drive Bill Davis Racing's new No. 55 car, but ownership was transferred to the newly merged (with the old No. 77 team) Waltrip-Jasper Racing to ensure that Waltrip would compete in the first five races. Despite the change, the No. 55 still received most of its equipment and crew from BDR. On January 23 in Charlotte, North Carolina, as part of the annual Media Tour, NASCAR announced that the Toyota Camry would be added to the series in 2007, meaning that Toyota would become the first non-American car manufacturer to run in the premier series since Jaguar in the mid-1950s. Waltrip-Jasper Racing and BDR became two of the first Toyota teams, although they raced Dodges. They did so without Dodge's support because BDR had raced Toyotas in the Craftsman Truck Series. The team hired Dave Blaney to take the wheel of the No. 22 Dodge. A third Toyota team, carrying the No. 83, was owned by Red Bull Energy Drink, with Brian Vickers as the driver. It was believed that they would also buy the No. 7 Jim Smith-owned team driven by Robby Gordon. 1988 series champion Bill Elliott attempted three races for Red Bull in a Dodge, as the 2006 Camry was not approved for racing. He didn't make any starts in the ride, nor did former Champ Car driver A. J. Allmendinger. With Blaney's departure, the No. 07 Chevy for Richard Childress Racing was driven by Clint Bowyer.

2004 Nextel Cup champion Kurt Busch replaced a retired Rusty Wallace in the No. 2 Dodge for Penske Racing. 2003 Rookie of the Year Jamie McMurray replaced Busch to drive Roush Racing's No. 26 (formerly 97) Ford. In addition, Mark Martin continued his "Salute to You" tour for their No. 6 car.

With the egressing of both McMurray and Sterling Marlin from Chip Ganassi Racing with Felix Sabates, Casey Mears became the senior driver and moved to No. 42 Dodge and Reed Sorenson took over his ride in the No. 41. David Stremme replaced Marlin in the No. 40 car. Sold to resort magnate Bob Ginn during the season and formerly numbered 10, Marlin drove the No. 14 car for MB2 Motorsports and Scott Riggs took the No. 10 car to Evernham Motorsports just as they switched from Chevy to Dodge. Jeremy Mayfield and Elliott Sadler were released from Evernham Motorsports and Robert Yates Racing. Sadler drove Evernham's No. 19, and David Gilliland replaced him in RYR No. 38 car; that change took effect for the GFS Marketplace 400.

Jeff Green replaced Mike Bliss in the No. 66 (formerly No. 0) car, which left Petty Enterprises' No. 43 Dodge open for former Joe Gibbs Racing driver Bobby Labonte to step in. His new teammate/team owner Kyle Petty brought sponsorships from Wells Fargo, NTB, and Schwan's to the No. 45 car, with Schwan's moving from the No. 49. Competitive Edge Motorsports ceased operations, and Marathon Petroleum Company sponsored Kyle Petty. J. J. Yeley took over for Labonte in JGR's No. 18 Chevrolet. Denny Hamlin, after scoring three Top 10 finishes at the end of the previous season, raced full-time in their newly entered No. 11 car, and he claimed rookie of the year honors, two checkered flags (both at Pocono Raceway, the first rookie to sweep both races in a single season) and third in the Championship standings.

Hall of Fame Racing started operations in 2006. Two-time Cup series champion Terry Labonte drove their No. 96 car for the first five races utilizing the past champions provisional rule, and Tony Raines took over at Martinsville. Labonte wound down his career "Texas Style" in the No. 44 Hendrick Motorsports second car following the Dickies 500 race in November in his home state at Texas Motor Speedway, where he finished 34th.

Brent Sherman took over for Ken Schrader in the No. 49 Dodge for BAM Racing, only to be replaced by Kevin Lepage, who started the season in the No. 61 (formerly No. 66) car for Peak Fitness Racing. Bliss replaced Sherman in the No. 49 as well. Front Row Motorsports hired Chad Chaffin to run for Rookie of the Year and Randy LaJoie (who was replaced by Chad Blount) to run full-time in their No. 34/92 car as well as buying Peak Fitness Racing's No. 61, suspending the 92's operations. Schrader replaced Ricky Rudd in the Wood Brothers No. 21 Ford. Starting this season, Wood Brothers made a partnership with JTG Racing (a Busch Series and Truck Series at the time) to field the No. 21 entry and the team was renamed to Wood Brothers/JTG Racing.

Scott Wimmer took Mike Wallace's place in Morgan-McClure Motorsports's No. 4 Chevrolet but departed when 2002 Daytona 500 champion Ward Burton took over for him late in the season after sitting on the sidelines. Travis Kvapil moved from the Jasper team to Chevrolet for PPI Motorsports. Furniture Row Racing announced it would run full-time, with Kenny Wallace driving their No. 78 Chevrolet.

== Schedule ==
No.	Race title	Track	Date
	Budweiser Shootout	Daytona International Speedway, Daytona Beach	February 12
	Gatorade Duel	Daytona International Speedway, Daytona Beach	February 16
1	Daytona 500	Daytona International Speedway, Daytona Beach	February 19
2	Auto Club 500	California Speedway, Fontana	February 26
3	UAW-DaimlerChrysler 400	Las Vegas Motor Speedway, Las Vegas, Nevada	March 12
4	Golden Corral 500	Atlanta Motor Speedway, Hampton	March 20
5	Food City 500	Bristol Motor Speedway, Bristol	March 26
6	DirecTV 500	Martinsville Speedway, Ridgeway	April 2
7	Samsung/Radio Shack 500	Texas Motor Speedway, Fort Worth	April 9
8	Subway Fresh 500	Phoenix International Raceway, Phoenix	April 22
9	Aaron's 499	Talladega Superspeedway, Talladega	May 1
10	Crown Royal 400	Richmond International Raceway, Richmond	May 6
11	Dodge Charger 500	Darlington Raceway, Darlington	May 13
	Nextel Open	Lowe's Motor Speedway, Concord	May 20
	Nextel All-Star Challenge	Lowe's Motor Speedway, Concord	May 20
12	Coca-Cola 600	Lowe's Motor Speedway, Concord	May 28
13	Neighborhood Excellence 400 presented by Bank of America	Dover International Speedway, Dover	June 4
14	Pocono 500	Pocono Raceway, Long Pond	June 11
15	3M Performance 400 presented by Post-It Picture Paper	Michigan International Speedway, Brooklyn	June 18
16	Dodge/Save Mart 350	Infineon Raceway, Sonoma	June 25
17	Pepsi 400	Daytona International Speedway, Daytona Beach	July 1
18	USG Sheetrock 400	Chicagoland Speedway, Joliet	July 9
19	Lenox Industrial Tools 300	New Hampshire International Speedway, Loudon	July 16
20	Pennsylvania 500	Pocono Raceway, Long Pond	July 23
21	Allstate 400 at the Brickyard	Indianapolis Motor Speedway, Speedway	August 6
22	AMD at The Glen	Watkins Glen International, Watkins Glen	August 13
23	GFS Marketplace 400	Michigan International Speedway, Brooklyn	August 20
24	Sharpie 500	Bristol Motor Speedway, Bristol	August 26
25	Sony HD 500	California Speedway, Fontana	September 3
26	Chevy Rock & Roll 400	Richmond International Raceway, Richmond	September 9
Chase for the Nextel Cup
27	Sylvania 300	New Hampshire International Speedway, Loudon	September 17
28	Dover 400	Dover International Speedway, Dover	September 24
29	Banquet 400 presented by ConAgra Foods	Kansas Speedway, Kansas City	October 1
30	UAW-Ford 500	Talladega Superspeedway, Talladega	October 8
31	Bank of America 500	Lowe's Motor Speedway, Concord	October 14
32	Subway 500	Martinsville Speedway, Ridgeway	October 22
33	Bass Pro Shops 500	Atlanta Motor Speedway, Hampton	October 29
34	Dickies 500	Texas Motor Speedway, Fort Worth	November 5
35	Checker Auto Parts 500 presented by Pennzoil	Phoenix International Raceway, Phoenix	November 12
36	Ford 400	Homestead–Miami Speedway, Homestead	November 19

== Races ==
No.	Race	Pole position	Most laps led	Winning driver	Manufacturer
	Budweiser Shootout	Ken Schrader	Ken Schrader	Denny Hamlin	Chevrolet
	Gatorade Duel 1	Jeff Burton	Elliott Sadler	Elliott Sadler	Ford
	Gatorade Duel 2	Jeff Gordon	Jeff Gordon	Jeff Gordon	Chevrolet
1	Daytona 500	Jeff Burton	Dale Earnhardt Jr.	Jimmie Johnson	Chevrolet
2	Auto Club 500	Kurt Busch	Greg Biffle	Matt Kenseth	Ford
3	UAW-Daimler Chrysler 400	Greg Biffle	Matt Kenseth	Jimmie Johnson	Chevrolet
4	Golden Corral 500	Kasey Kahne	Greg Biffle	Kasey Kahne	Dodge
5	Food City 500	Tony Stewart	Tony Stewart	Kurt Busch	Dodge
6	DirecTV 500	Jimmie Johnson	Tony Stewart	Tony Stewart	Chevrolet
7	Samsung/Radio Shack 500	Kasey Kahne	Tony Stewart	Kasey Kahne	Dodge
8	Subway Fresh 500	Kyle Busch	Greg Biffle	Kevin Harvick	Chevrolet
9	Aaron's 499	Elliott Sadler	Jeff Gordon	Jimmie Johnson	Chevrolet
10	Crown Royal 400	Greg Biffle	Kevin Harvick	Dale Earnhardt Jr.	Chevrolet
11	Dodge Charger 500	Kasey Kahne	Greg Biffle	Greg Biffle	Ford
	Nextel Open	Scott Riggs	Scott Riggs	Scott Riggs	Dodge
	Nextel All-Star Challenge	Kasey Kahne	Jimmie Johnson	Jimmie Johnson	Chevrolet
12	Coca-Cola 600	Scott Riggs	Kasey Kahne	Kasey Kahne	Dodge
13	Neighborhood Excellence 400 presented by Bank of America	Ryan Newman	Jamie McMurray	Matt Kenseth	Ford
14	Pocono 500	Denny Hamlin	Denny Hamlin	Denny Hamlin	Chevrolet
15	3M Performance 400 presented by Post-It Picture Paper	Kasey Kahne	Jeff Gordon	Kasey Kahne	Dodge
16	Dodge/Save Mart 350	Kurt Busch	Jeff Gordon	Jeff Gordon	Chevrolet
17	Pepsi 400	Boris Said	Tony Stewart	Tony Stewart	Chevrolet
18	USG Sheetrock 400	Jeff Burton	Matt Kenseth	Jeff Gordon	Chevrolet
19	Lenox Industrial Tools 300	Ryan Newman	Kyle Busch	Kyle Busch	Chevrolet
20	Pennsylvania 500	Denny Hamlin	Denny Hamlin	Denny Hamlin	Chevrolet
21	Allstate 400 at the Brickyard	Jeff Burton	Jeff Burton	Jimmie Johnson	Chevrolet
22	AMD at the Glen	Kurt Busch	Kurt Busch	Kevin Harvick	Chevrolet
23	GFS Marketplace 400	Jeff Burton	Matt Kenseth	Matt Kenseth	Ford
24	Sharpie 500	Kurt Busch	Jeff Burton	Matt Kenseth	Ford
25	Sony HD 500	Kurt Busch	Kasey Kahne	Kasey Kahne	Dodge
26	Chevy Rock & Roll 400	Denny Hamlin	Kyle Busch	Kevin Harvick	Chevrolet
27	Sylvania 300	Kevin Harvick	Kevin Harvick	Kevin Harvick	Chevrolet
28	Dover 400	Jeff Gordon	Matt Kenseth	Jeff Burton	Chevrolet
29	Banquet 400 presented by ConAgra Foods	Kasey Kahne	Jimmie Johnson	Tony Stewart	Chevrolet
30	UAW-Ford 500	David Gilliland	Dale Earnhardt Jr.	Brian Vickers	Chevrolet
31	Bank of America 500	Scott Riggs	Kasey Kahne	Kasey Kahne	Dodge
32	Subway 500	Kurt Busch	Jimmie Johnson	Jimmie Johnson	Chevrolet
33	Bass Pro Shops MBNA 500	Matt Kenseth	Tony Stewart	Tony Stewart	Chevrolet
34	Dickies 500	Brian Vickers	Tony Stewart	Tony Stewart	Chevrolet
35	Checker Auto Parts 500 presented by Pennzoil	Jeff Gordon	Kevin Harvick	Kevin Harvick	Chevrolet
36	Ford 400	Kasey Kahne	Kasey Kahne	Greg Biffle	Ford

=== Budweiser Shootout ===
This non-points race, which involved the previous season's pole winners and past Shootout winners, was held February 12 at Daytona International Speedway after a postponement of one day due to rain, and in a major upset, rookie Denny Hamlin won the event. Even though he was classified as a rookie, Hamlin had qualified by winning the pole position for the Checker Auto Parts 500 held November 13, 2005 in Phoenix. Hamlin drove in only 7 Nextel Cup races in 2005.

Top-ten results:

1. #11 - Denny Hamlin
2. #8 - Dale Earnhardt Jr.
3. #20 - Tony Stewart
4. #10 - Scott Riggs
5. #48 - Jimmie Johnson
6. #17 - Matt Kenseth
7. #6 - Mark Martin
8. #26 - Jamie McMurray
9. #01 - Joe Nemechek
10. #88 - Dale Jarrett

=== Gatorade Duels ===
Jeff Burton won the pole for the race with a speed of over 189 mph, and would start alongside Jeff Gordon in an all-Chevy front row. Gordon would win the second Gatorade Duel (his third career victory in a Daytona qualifying race) after Elliott Sadler won in race 1, which was delayed by showers.

Top-ten results (Duel #1):

1. #38 - Elliott Sadler
2. #99 - Carl Edwards
3. #8 - Dale Earnhardt Jr.
4. #48 - Jimmie Johnson
5. #17 - Matt Kenseth
6. #2 - Kurt Busch
7. #31 - Jeff Burton
8. #20 - Tony Stewart
9. #11 - Denny Hamlin *
10. #1 - Martin Truex Jr. *

Top-ten results (Duel #2):

1. #24 - Jeff Gordon
2. #5 - Kyle Busch
3. #26 - Jamie McMurray
4. #43 - Bobby Labonte
5. #6 - Mark Martin
6. #45 - Kyle Petty
7. #42 - Casey Mears
8. #16 - Greg Biffle
9. #12 - Ryan Newman
10. #7 - Robby Gordon

=== Daytona 500 ===
- Complete Results

The 48th running of the Daytona 500 was held on February 19, Jeff Burton won the pole.

Top-ten results: (Race distance extended to 203 laps/507.5 miles due to green-white-checkered rule.)

1. #48 - Jimmie Johnson
2. #42 - Casey Mears
3. #12 - Ryan Newman
4. #38 - Elliott Sadler
5. #20 - Tony Stewart
6. #07 - Clint Bowyer *
7. #25 - Brian Vickers
8. #8 - Dale Earnhardt Jr.
9. #21 - Ken Schrader
10. #88 - Dale Jarrett

Failed to qualify: Scott Riggs (#10), Kenny Wallace (#78), Scott Wimmer (#4), Mike Skinner (#23), Derrike Cope (#74), Larry Gunselman (#52), Chad Blount (#37), Larry Foyt (#50), Andy Belmont (#59), Randy LaJoie (#64), Morgan Shepherd (#89), Chad Chaffin (#92), Carl Long (#80), Paul Menard (#15), Stanton Barrett (#95)

- The start of the race was pushed back to 2:45 pm, as NBC chose it as its lead-in program to the primetime portion of its day's coverage of the Winter Olympic Games from Turin.
- Reigning champion Tony Stewart became embroiled in controversy during the race. On lap 106, Stewart made contact with Matt Kenseth, sending Kenseth's car spinning through the grass and onto the track, with many cars narrowly avoiding him. Stewart was penalized for aggressive driving after the incident, and Kenseth would be penalized for hitting Stewart's car in retaliation on pit road.
- As of 2024, this was the final Daytona 500 televised by NBC. The NASCAR TV deal for 2001 through 2006 allowed for FOX and NBC to rotate the Daytona 500 and the Pepsi 400 every year. FOX would broadcast the Daytona 500 on odd-numbered years, and NBC would broadcast the race on even-numbered years. FOX would televise every Daytona 500 after the new broadcast rights deal went into effect in 2007.
- As of 2026, this race holds the record for highest TV viewership in NASCAR history, with an average of 19.355 million viewers.

=== Auto Club 500 ===
- Complete Results

The Auto Club 500 was held on February 26 at California Speedway. Kurt Busch won the pole.

Top-ten results: (Race distance extended to 502 miles/251 laps due to green-white checkered rule.)

1. #17 - Matt Kenseth
2. #48 - Jimmie Johnson
3. #99 - Carl Edwards
4. #9 - Kasey Kahne
5. #31 - Jeff Burton
6. #26 - Jamie McMurray
7. #42 - Casey Mears
8. #18 - J. J. Yeley
9. #6 - Mark Martin
10. #5 - Kyle Busch

Failed to qualify: Travis Kvapil (#32), Hermie Sadler (#00), Derrike Cope (#74), Randy LaJoie (#34), Morgan Shepherd (#89)

- Multiple Dodge teams, including pole-sitter Kurt Busch, ran this race using the 2004 Dodge Intrepid-styled body, as opposed to the new Dodge Charger, as Penske Racing believed the Intrepid body was aerodynamically superior to the Charger. Both Penske cars, and the Petty Enterprises #43 team, ran the Intrepid body.

=== UAW-DaimlerChrysler 400 ===
- Complete Results

The UAW-DaimlerChrysler 400 was held on March 12 at Las Vegas Motor Speedway. Greg Biffle won the pole..

Top-ten results: (Race distance extended to 270 laps/405 miles due to green-white-checkered rule.)

1. #48 - Jimmie Johnson
2. #17 - Matt Kenseth
3. #5 - Kyle Busch
4. #9 - Kasey Kahne
5. #24 - Jeff Gordon
6. #6 - Mark Martin
7. #31 - Jeff Burton
8. #16 - Greg Biffle
9. #42 - Casey Mears
10. #11 - Denny Hamlin

Failed to qualify: Stanton Barrett (#95), Hermie Sadler (#00), Brandon Ash (#02), Mike Skinner (#37), Morgan Shepherd (#89), Randy LaJoie (#92)

=== Golden Corral 500 ===
- Complete Results

The Golden Corral 500, held at Atlanta Motor Speedway, was scheduled for Sunday, March 19, but rain showers postponed the race to Monday, March 20 at 11 am. Television coverage moved to cable's FX channel for the race (with some exceptions). Kasey Kahne sat on the pole with a speed of 192.553 mph.

Top-ten results:

1. #9 - Kasey Kahne
2. #6 - Mark Martin
3. #8 - Dale Earnhardt Jr.
4. #24 - Jeff Gordon
5. #20 - Tony Stewart
6. #48 - Jimmie Johnson
7. #15 - Paul Menard
8. #45 - Kyle Petty
9. #88 - Dale Jarrett
10. #41 - Reed Sorenson

Failed to qualify: Mike Garvey (#51), Stanton Barrett (#95), Chad Chaffin (#34), Derrike Cope (#74), Kenny Wallace (#78), Travis Kvapil (#32), Mike Skinner (#37), Greg Sacks (#13), Chad Blount (#92)

- A scary incident took place on pit road during the sixth caution of the day (laps 189–197), when Reed Sorenson hit John Slusher, catch can man for Robby Gordon's crew, as he pulled out of his pit stall. Slusher was treated at the infield care center.
- Bill Lester made his Cup Series debut in this race, becoming the first African-American to start a NASCAR Nextel Cup race since 1986. Lester qualified 19th and finished 38th, six laps down.

=== Food City 500 ===
- Complete Results

The Food City 500, was held at Bristol Motor Speedway on March 26. Qualifying was cancelled on March 24 due to snow, sleet and rain, and the field was set with top 35 owners points from 2005, the Champion's Provisional (for Terry Labonte) and seven others, based on qualifying attempts in 2006. As a result, 2005 champion Tony Stewart sat on pole.

Top-ten results:

1. #2 - Kurt Busch
2. #29 - Kevin Harvick
3. #17 - Matt Kenseth*
4. #99 - Carl Edwards
5. #43 - Bobby Labonte
6. #6 - Mark Martin
7. #16 - Greg Biffle
8. #5 - Kyle Busch
9. #12 - Ryan Newman
10. #9 - Kasey Kahne

Failed to qualify: Chad Chaffin (#34), Mike Skinner (#37), Mike Garvey (#51), Derrike Cope (#74), Kenny Wallace (#78), Morgan Shepherd (#89), Chad Blount (#92).

- This was Dodge's first win at Bristol since Richard Petty in 1975.
- The race featured 18 cautions, with over 100 of the 500 laps were run under the yellow flag. Points leader Jimmie Johnson made contact with Reed Sorenson, resulting in a flat tire and putting Johnson multiple laps down. He finished 30th.
- On the final lap, Matt Kenseth spun Jeff Gordon out while battling for 3rd-place. Gordon finished 21st and was involved in a shoving match with Kenseth on pit road after the race.

=== DirecTV 500 ===
- Complete Results

The DirecTV 500, was held at Martinsville Speedway on April 2. Jimmie Johnson won the pole.

Top-ten results:

1. #20 - Tony Stewart
2. #24 - Jeff Gordon
3. #48 - Jimmie Johnson
4. #8 - Dale Earnhardt Jr.
5. #5 - Kyle Busch
6. #38 - Elliott Sadler
7. #29 - Kevin Harvick
8. #25 - Brian Vickers
9. #26 - Jamie McMurray
10. #10 - Scott Riggs

Failed to qualify: Derrike Cope (#74), Kevin Lepage (#61), Kenny Wallace (#78), Jimmy Spencer (#49), Morgan Shepherd (#89), Hermie Sadler (#00).

- This race became the subject of controversy involving Dateline NBC. Reacting to widespread Islamophobia in the United States, NBC producers reportedly sent actors dressed as Muslims to the race, as well as a camera crew to record the reaction to their presence. Reportedly, fans at the track largely ignored the actors, while others reacted positively to seeing them. The network received backlash from NASCAR when the scheme was exposed, as many felt it was an attempt by NBC to portray the sport, and its fans, in a negative light. The incident was quickly buried, and is largely forgotten today.

=== Samsung/Radio Shack 500 ===
- Complete Results

The Samsung/Radio Shack 500 was held at Texas Motor Speedway on April 9. Kasey Kahne won the pole.

Top-ten results:

1. #9 - Kasey Kahne
2. #17 - Matt Kenseth
3. #20 - Tony Stewart
4. #11 - Denny Hamlin
5. #29 - Kevin Harvick
6. #31 - Jeff Burton
7. #10 - Scott Riggs
8. #1 - Martin Truex Jr.
9. #6 - Mark Martin
10. #43 - Bobby Labonte

Failed to qualify: Brent Sherman (#49), Chad Blount (#92), Kenny Wallace (#78), Chad Chaffin (#34), Stanton Barrett (#95).

=== Subway Fresh 500 ===
- Complete Results

The Subway Fresh 500 was held at Phoenix International Raceway on April 22. Kyle Busch won the pole.

Top-ten results:

1. #29 - Kevin Harvick
2. #20 - Tony Stewart
3. #17 - Matt Kenseth
4. #99 - Carl Edwards
5. #07 - Clint Bowyer
6. #9 - Kasey Kahne
7. #48 - Jimmie Johnson
8. #43 - Bobby Labonte
9. #31 - Jeff Burton
10. #24 - Jeff Gordon

Failed to qualify: Chad Chaffin (#34), Mike Garvey (#51), Chad Blount (#92), Kevin Lepage (#61), Morgan Shepherd (#89), Steve Portenga (#52)

=== Aaron's 499 ===
- Complete Results

The Aaron's 499, held at Talladega Superspeedway, was scheduled for April 30. However, due to rain starting one lap prior to the green flag, the event was postponed until the following day. Television coverage was moved from Fox to FX except for several Fox stations which elected to carry the race. Elliott Sadler won the pole. The Aaron's 499 was one of five impound races this year in the Nextel Cup Series.

Top-ten results:

1. #48 - Jimmie Johnson
2. #20 - Tony Stewart
3. #25 - Brian Vickers
4. #31 - Jeff Burton
5. #26 - Jamie McMurray
6. #17 - Matt Kenseth
7. #2 - Kurt Busch
8. #99 - Carl Edwards
9. #10 - Scott Riggs
10. #7 - Robby Gordon

Failed to qualify: Morgan Shepherd (#89), Stanton Barrett (#95), Mike Wallace (#09), Chad Blount (#92), Brent Sherman (#49), Kenny Wallace (#78)

=== Crown Royal 400 ===
- Complete Results

The Crown Royal 400 was held at Richmond International Raceway on May 6. Greg Biffle won the pole. This was the second impound race of the 2006 season.

Top-ten results:

1. #8 - Dale Earnhardt Jr.*
2. #11 - Denny Hamlin
3. #29 - Kevin Harvick
4. #16 - Greg Biffle
5. #5 - Kyle Busch
6. #20 - Tony Stewart
7. #99 - Carl Edwards
8. #12 - Ryan Newman
9. #14 - Sterling Marlin*
10. #07 - Clint Bowyer

Failed to qualify: Kertus Davis (#89), Chad Chaffin (#34), Stanton Barrett (#95), Hermie Sadler (#00)

- This was Dale Earnhardt Jr.'s final victory driving for Dale Earnhardt, Inc.. Earnhardt went winless in 2007 before joining Hendrick Motorsports in 2008.
- Final career Top 10 finish for Sterling Marlin.

=== Dodge Charger 500 ===
- Complete Results

The Dodge Charger 500 was held at Darlington Raceway on May 13. Kasey Kahne won the pole.

Top-ten results:

1. #16 - Greg Biffle
2. #24 - Jeff Gordon
3. #17 - Matt Kenseth
4. #48 - Jimmie Johnson
5. #8 - Dale Earnhardt Jr.
6. #12 - Ryan Newman
7. #5 - Kyle Busch
8. #6 - Mark Martin
9. #31 - Jeff Burton
10. #11 - Denny Hamlin

Failed to qualify: Chad Chaffin (#61), Kenny Wallace (#78), Carl Long (#37), Chad Blount (#34)

=== Nextel Open ===
The first of two non-points doubleheader races was held May 20 at Lowe's Motor Speedway. Scott Riggs won the pole, and would go on to win after leading every lap.

Top-ten results

1. #10 - Scott Riggs*
2. #66 - Jeff Green
3. #25 - Brian Vickers
4. #11 - Denny Hamlin
5. #18 - J. J. Yeley
6. #40 - David Stremme
7. #31 - Jeff Burton
8. #14 - Sterling Marlin
9. #7 - Robby Gordon
10. #21 - Ken Schrader
- Riggs' victory would transfer him into the All-Star Challenge. Kyle Petty, who finished 22nd, would win the fan vote, and also transfer into the All-Star Challenge.

=== Nextel All-Star Challenge ===
The second non-points race was held May 20 at Lowe's Motor Speedway. Kasey Kahne won the pole in the unique three-lap qualifier that included a required four-tire pit stop.

Top-ten results

1. #48 - Jimmie Johnson
2. #29 - Kevin Harvick
3. #24 - Jeff Gordon
4. #99 - Carl Edwards
5. #12 - Ryan Newman
6. #43 - Bobby Labonte
7. #88 - Dale Jarrett
8. #45 - Kyle Petty
9. #8 - Dale Earnhardt Jr.
10. #10 - Scott Riggs

=== Coca-Cola 600 ===
- Complete Results

The Coca-Cola 600, NASCAR's longest race in terms of distance, was run on May 28 at Lowe's Motor Speedway. Scott Riggs won the pole.

Top-ten results:

1. #9 - Kasey Kahne
2. #48 - Jimmie Johnson*
3. #99 - Carl Edwards
4. #6 - Mark Martin
5. #17 - Matt Kenseth
6. #31 - Jeff Burton
7. #16 - Greg Biffle
8. #26 - Jamie McMurray
9. #11 - Denny Hamlin
10. #41 - Reed Sorenson

Failed to qualify: Kevin Lepage (#49), Hermie Sadler (#00), Chad Chaffin (#61), Michael Waltrip (#55)*, Stanton Barrett (#95), Mike Garvey (#51), Chad Blount (#34), Carl Long (#37), Kirk Shelmerdine (#27), Kertus Davis (#72).

- Jimmie Johnson's 2nd-place finish ended his quest to win 5 straight races at Charlotte. He would also fail to break out of a 3-way tie with Bill Elliott and Dale Earnhardt Jr. by trying to win 5 straight superspeedway races at one track.
- Tony Stewart crashed hard on lap 33, aggravating injuries suffered in the Busch Series race the previous night.
- Michael Waltrip failed to qualify, but he bought Derrike Cope's 43rd starting spot.
- Kyle Busch was fined $50,000 and docked 25 championship points for throwing his HANS device at Casey Mears after an accident.

=== Neighborhood Excellence 400 presented by Bank of America ===
- Complete Results

The Neighborhood Excellence 400 presented by Bank of America was held at Dover International Speedway on June 4. Ryan Newman won the pole.

Top-ten results:

1. #17 - Matt Kenseth
2. #26 - Jamie McMurray
3. #29 - Kevin Harvick
4. #31 - Jeff Burton
5. #5 - Kyle Busch
6. #48 - Jimmie Johnson
7. #9 - Kasey Kahne
8. #16 - Greg Biffle
9. #6 - Mark Martin
10. #8 - Dale Earnhardt Jr.

Failed to qualify: Carl Long (#34), Donnie Neuenberger (#52), Chad Chaffin (#61), and Stanton Barrett (#95).

- Tony Stewart, still recovering from a broken scapula after crashing at Charlotte, needed relief from Ricky Rudd, who was taking a year off from racing.
- This was the final NASCAR Cup Series race aired on FX.

=== Pocono 500 ===
- Complete Results

The Pocono 500 was held at Pocono Raceway on June 11. Denny Hamlin won the pole.

Top Ten Results:

1. #11 - Denny Hamlin*
2. #2 - Kurt Busch
3. #20 - Tony Stewart
4. #25 - Brian Vickers
5. #17 - Matt Kenseth
6. #16 - Greg Biffle
7. #9 - Kasey Kahne
8. #10 - Scott Riggs
9. #31 - Jeff Burton
10. #48 - Jimmie Johnson

Failed to qualify: Scott Wimmer (#4), Derrike Cope (#74), Stanton Barrett (#95), Greg Sacks (#34), Brent Sherman (#72)

- This was Denny Hamlin's first career Cup Series points race victory.
- On lap 51, Hamlin spun out of the lead after blowing a left-rear tire, dropping him back to 40th-place. Despite this, Hamlin managed to recover and win the race.

=== 3M Performance 400 ===
- Complete Results

The 3M Performance 400 was held at Michigan International Speedway on June 18. Kasey Kahne won the pole.

Top-ten Results: (Race called after 129 laps/258 miles because of rain.)

1. #9 - Kasey Kahne
2. #99 - Carl Edwards
3. #8 - Dale Earnhardt Jr.
4. #16 - Greg Biffle
5. #41 - Reed Sorenson
6. #48 - Jimmie Johnson
7. #42 - Casey Mears
8. #24 - Jeff Gordon
9. #2 - Kurt Busch
10. #29 - Kevin Harvick

Failed to qualify: Carl Long (#37), Mike Garvey (#51), Chad Chaffin (#61), Jimmy Spencer (#78)

=== Dodge/Save Mart 350 ===
- Complete Results

The Dodge/Save Mart 350, the 100th road course race in Cup history, was held at Infineon Raceway on June 25. Kurt Busch won the pole.

Top-ten results:

1. #24 - Jeff Gordon
2. #12 - Ryan Newman
3. #96 - Terry Labonte*
4. #8 - Dale Earnhardt Jr.
5. #2 - Kurt Busch
6. #99 - Carl Edwards
7. #31 - Jeff Burton
8. #38 - Elliott Sadler
9. #60 - Boris Said
10. #48 - Jimmie Johnson

Failed to qualify: Johnny Miller (#34), Chris Cook (#49), Travis Kvapil (#78), Stanton Barrett (#95), Brian Simo (#61)

- Tom Hubert had his third-consecutive 43rd-place finish at Sonoma going back to 2003.
- Terry Labonte running a part-time schedule for Hendrick Motorsports and Hall of Fame Racing, finished an amazing third-place finish in the #96 DLP HD TV Chevrolet, after leading the race with less than 20 laps to go. It was also Labonte's last career top-5.

=== Pepsi 400 ===
- Complete Results

The Pepsi 400 was held at Daytona International Speedway on July 1. Road racer Boris Said won the pole, his first on an oval. This race was the third impound race of the season.

Top-ten results:

1. #20 - Tony Stewart
2. #5 - Kyle Busch
3. #2 - Kurt Busch
4. #60 - Boris Said*
5. #17 - Matt Kenseth
6. #38 - Elliott Sadler
7. #42 - Casey Mears
8. #26 - Jamie McMurray
9. #29 - Kevin Harvick
10. #07 - Clint Bowyer

Failed to qualify: Scott Wimmer (#4), Kevin Lepage (#49), Kenny Wallace (#78), Chad Blount (#34), Kertus Davis (#72)

- Because of a strategy call by his crew chief with three laps to go Said led the race but Tony Stewart got by Said for the win just before the white flag waved. Said ended up fourth and emotionally said after the race that his performance was the highlight of his career.

=== USG Sheetrock 400 ===
- Complete Results

The USG Sheetrock 400 was held at Chicagoland Speedway on July 9. Jeff Burton won the pole.

Top-ten results: (Race distance extended to 270 laps/405 miles due to green-white-checkered rule.)

1. #24 - Jeff Gordon
2. #31 - Jeff Burton
3. #5 - Kyle Busch
4. #29 - Kevin Harvick
5. #8 - Dale Earnhardt Jr.
6. #48 - Jimmie Johnson
7. #41 - Reed Sorenson
8. #2 - Kurt Busch
9. #07 - Clint Bowyer
10. #18 - J. J. Yeley

Failed to qualify: Paul Menard (#15), Kevin Lepage (#49), Chad Blount (#61), Brent Sherman (#04), Mike Garvey (#51), Derrike Cope (#74), Carl Long (#34)

=== Lenox Industrial Tools 300 ===
- Complete Results

The Lenox Industrial Tools 300 was held at New Hampshire International Speedway on July 16. Ryan Newman won his second pole of the season.

Top-ten results: (Race distance extended to 308 laps/308 miles due to green-white-checkered rule.)

1. #5 - Kyle Busch
2. #99 - Carl Edwards
3. #16 - Greg Biffle
4. #6 - Mark Martin
5. #29 - Kevin Harvick
6. #11 - Denny Hamlin
7. #31 - Jeff Burton
8. #9 - Kasey Kahne
9. #48 - Jimmie Johnson
10. #10 - Scott Riggs

Failed to qualify: Ted Christopher (#61), Joey McCarthy (#34), Derrike Cope (#74), Morgan Shepherd (#89)

=== Pennsylvania 500 ===
- Complete Results

The Pennsylvania 500 was held at Pocono Raceway on July 23. Denny Hamlin won the pole.

Top-ten results:

1. #11 - Denny Hamlin*
2. #2 - Kurt Busch
3. #24 - Jeff Gordon
4. #25 - Brian Vickers
5. #29 - Kevin Harvick
6. #48 - Jimmie Johnson
7. #20 - Tony Stewart
8. #43 - Bobby Labonte
9. #31 - Jeff Burton
10. #1 - Martin Truex Jr.

Failed to qualify: Greg Sacks (#34), Stanton Barrett (#52), Derrike Cope (#74), Jimmy Spencer (#78)*

- Hamlin's victory would result in a season sweep at Pocono, becoming the first rookie to sweep a track in a season since Jimmie Johnson in 2002. Hamlin led 151 of the race's 200 laps.
- Chad Chaffin originally qualified for the race, but his time was disqualified due to failing a post-qualifying inspection. Jimmy Spencer took his place in the grid as he was the fastest of the four who failed to qualify on time.
- Last career start for Jimmy Spencer.

=== Allstate 400 at the Brickyard ===
- Complete Results

The Allstate 400 at the Brickyard was held at Indianapolis Motor Speedway on August 6. Jeff Burton won the pole.

Top Ten Results:

1. #48 - Jimmie Johnson*
2. #17 - Matt Kenseth
3. #29 - Kevin Harvick
4. #07 - Clint Bowyer
5. #6 - Mark Martin
6. #8 - Dale Earnhardt Jr.
7. #5 - Kyle Busch
8. #99 - Carl Edwards
9. #20 - Tony Stewart
10. #2 - Kurt Busch

Failed to qualify: Paul Menard (#15), Michael Waltrip (#55), Johnny Sauter (#70), Kevin Lepage (#49), Stephen Leicht (#90), Bobby Hamilton Jr. (#04), Derrike Cope (#61)

- With this victory, Johnson became the second driver to win both the Daytona 500 and the Allstate 400 in the same season, first accomplished by Dale Jarrett in 1996. Johnson came from 38th-place to win.
- This was the final race for Jeremy Mayfield in the #19 Evernham Motorsports Dodge. He had fallen out of the top 35 in owner's points, thereby no longer guaranteeing him a spot in each race.

=== AMD at The Glen ===
- Complete Results

The AMD at The Glen, NASCAR's second and final road course race of the season, was held at Watkins Glen International on August 13. Kurt Busch won the pole.

Top-ten results:

1. #29 - Kevin Harvick
2. #20 - Tony Stewart
3. #26 - Jamie McMurray
4. #7 - Robby Gordon
5. #99 - Carl Edwards
6. #40 - Scott Pruett
7. #38 - Elliott Sadler*
8. #12 - Ryan Newman
9. #5 - Kyle Busch
10. #11 - Denny Hamlin

Failed to qualify: Chris Cook (#49), Max Papis (#78), Tom Hubert (#27), David Murry (#37), Dale Quarterley (#72), Johnny Miller (#92), Brandon Ash (#02)

- Bill Elliott drove the #19 Dodge for Evernham Motorsports in this race, replacing Jeremy Mayfield.
- This would be the last race for Eliott Sadler in the #38 Ford. As of August 20, he would drive the Evernham Motorsports' #19 Dodge.

=== GFS Marketplace 400 ===
- Complete Results

The GFS Marketplace 400 was held at Michigan International Speedway on August 20. Jeff Burton won his fourth pole of the year.

Top-ten results:

1. #17 - Matt Kenseth
2. #24 - Jeff Gordon
3. #20 - Tony Stewart
4. #9 - Kasey Kahne
5. #6 - Mark Martin
6. #8 - Dale Earnhardt Jr.
7. #16 - Greg Biffle
8. #41 - Reed Sorenson
9. #11 - Denny Hamlin
10. #19 - Elliott Sadler

Failed to qualify: Scott Wimmer (#4), Mike Skinner (#34), Chad Chaffin (#61), Kenny Wallace (#78)

=== Sharpie 500 ===
- Complete Results

The Sharpie 500 was held on August 26 at Bristol International Speedway. Kurt Busch won the pole.

Top-ten results:

1. #17 - Matt Kenseth +
2. #5 - Kyle Busch
3. #8 - Dale Earnhardt Jr.
4. #10 - Scott Riggs
5. #24 - Jeff Gordon
6. #11 - Denny Hamlin
7. #99 - Carl Edwards
8. #12 - Ryan Newman
9. #31 - Jeff Burton
10. #48 - Jimmie Johnson +

Failed to qualify: Chad Chaffin (#61), Hermie Sadler (#00), Mike Wallace (#09), Mike Skinner (#37), Morgan Shepard (#89) (withdrew), Stanton Barrett (#30) (withdrew)

+ – Clinched spots in the Chase for the Nextel Cup.

=== Sony HD 500 ===
- Complete Results

The Sony HD 500 was held at California Speedway on September 3. Kurt Busch won the pole.

Top-ten results:

1. #9 - Kasey Kahne
2. #8 - Dale Earnhardt Jr.
3. #07 - Clint Bowyer
4. #99 - Carl Edwards
5. #24 - Jeff Gordon
6. #11 - Denny Hamlin
7. #17 - Matt Kenseth
8. #5 - Kyle Busch
9. #20 - Tony Stewart
10. #88 - Dale Jarrett

Failed to qualify: Todd Kluever (#06), Kertus Davis (#34), Chad Chaffin (#61), Bill Lester (#23)

=== Chevy Rock and Roll 400 ===
- Complete Results

The Chevy Rock and Roll 400, the last race of the regular season, was held at Richmond International Raceway on September 9. Denny Hamlin won the pole. This was the season's fourth impound race.

Top-ten results:

1. #29 - Kevin Harvick +
2. #5 - Kyle Busch +
3. #9 - Kasey Kahne +
4. #22 - Dave Blaney
5. #6 - Mark Martin +
6. #16 - Greg Biffle
7. #21 - Ken Schrader
8. #17 - Matt Kenseth
9. #31 - Jeff Burton +
10. #10 - Scott Riggs

Failed to qualify: Derrike Cope (#74), Mike Wallace (#09), Michael Waltrip (#55), Hermie Sadler (#00), Ted Christopher (#27)

+ – Clinched spots in the Chase for the Nextel Cup.

Making The Chase - The following 10 drivers made the Chase for the Cup field in 2006:

1. #17 - Matt Kenseth
2. #48 - Jimmie Johnson
3. #29 - Kevin Harvick
4. #5 - Kyle Busch
5. #11 - Denny Hamlin
6. #8 - Dale Earnhardt Jr.
7. #6 - Mark Martin
8. #31 - Jeff Burton
9. #24 - Jeff Gordon
10. #9 - Kasey Kahne

== Chase for the Nextel Cup ==
• - Indicates one of the 10 drivers in the Chase for the Nextel Cup.

=== Sylvania 300 ===
- Complete Results

The Sylvania 300, the first race in the 2006 Chase for the Nextel Cup, was held on September 17 at New Hampshire International Speedway. Kevin Harvick won the pole and the race.

Top-ten results:

1. #29 - Kevin Harvick* •
2. #20 - Tony Stewart
3. #24 - Jeff Gordon •
4. #11 - Denny Hamlin •
5. #25 - Brian Vickers
6. #19 - Elliott Sadler
7. #31 - Jeff Burton •
8. #18 - J. J. Yeley
9. #22 - Dave Blaney
10. #17 - Matt Kenseth •

Failed to qualify: Stanton Barrett (#30), Derrike Cope (#74), Carl Long (#46), Kenny Wallace (#78), Chad Blount (#34)

- Harvick's victory gave him the points lead, the first time Harvick has ever lead the Cup Series championship.

=== Dover 400 ===
- Complete Results

The Dover 400 was held on September 24 at Dover International Speedway. Jeff Gordon won the pole.

Top-ten results:

1. #31 - Jeff Burton* •
2. #99 - Carl Edwards
3. #24 - Jeff Gordon •
4. #2 - Kurt Busch
5. #16 - Greg Biffle
6. #1 - Martin Truex Jr.
7. #43 - Bobby Labonte
8. #07 - Clint Bowyer
9. #11 - Denny Hamlin •
10. #17 - Matt Kenseth •

Failed to qualify: Morgan Shepherd (#89), Kenny Wallace (#78), Chad Blount (#34), Donnie Neuenberger (#52)

- This was Burton's first Cup Series victory since Phoenix in November 2001, breaking a 175-race winless streak.

=== Banquet 400 presented by ConAgra Foods ===
- Complete Results

The Banquet 400 was held on October 1 at Kansas Speedway. Kasey Kahne won the pole.

Top ten results:

1. #20 - Tony Stewart*
2. #42 - Casey Mears
3. #6 - Mark Martin •
4. #88 - Dale Jarrett*
5. #31 - Jeff Burton •
6. #99 - Carl Edwards
7. #5 - Kyle Busch •
8. #25 - Brian Vickers
9. #07 - Clint Bowyer
10. #8 - Dale Earnhardt Jr. •

Failed to qualify: Scott Wimmer (#4), Kevin Lepage (#49), Chad Blount (#92), Carl Long (#46)

- Tony Stewart ran out of fuel after taking the white flag, running the last half of the final lap with no fuel.
- This marked the first time that NBC broadcast a race in 1080i (HDTV).
- Dale Jarrett would score his last career top-5, and top-10, in this race.

=== UAW-Ford 500 ===
- Complete Results

The UAW-Ford 500 was held at the newly repaved Talladega Superspeedway on October 8. The repaving was the first on the 2.66-mile trioval since 1979. David Gilliland won his first career pole. This race was the fifth and final impound race of the season.

Top-ten results:

1. #25 - Brian Vickers*
2. #9 - Kasey Kahne •
3. #2 - Kurt Busch
4. #17 - Matt Kenseth •
5. #1 - Martin Truex Jr.*
6. #29 - Kevin Harvick •
7. #66 - Jeff Green
8. #43 - Bobby Labonte
9. #6 - Mark Martin •
10. #99 - Carl Edwards

Failed to qualify: Hermie Sadler (#00), Todd Bodine (#4), Kirk Shelmerdine (#27), Travis Kvapil (#32), Kevin Lepage (#34), Chad Chaffin (#61)

- This was Brian Vickers' first Nextel Cup victory, which came under controversy after he, Jimmie Johnson, and Dale Earnhardt Jr. made contact on the final lap, spinning both Earnhardt and Johnson out.
- First career top 5 for Martin Truex Jr.

=== Bank of America 500 ===
- Complete Results

The Bank of America 500 was held on October 14 at Lowe's Motor Speedway. The event was the only Saturday night race in the Chase. Scott Riggs won the pole.

Top-ten results:

1. #9 - Kasey Kahne •
2. #48 - Jimmie Johnson •
3. #31 - Jeff Burton •
4. #8 - Dale Earnhardt Jr. •
5. #43 - Bobby Labonte
6. #5 - Kyle Busch •
7. #96 - Tony Raines
8. #99 - Carl Edwards
9. #01 - Joe Nemechek
10. #25 - Brian Vickers

Failed to qualify: Bill Elliott (#83), Kevin Lepage (#34), Derrike Cope (#74), Chad Chaffin (#61), Hermie Sadler (#00), Kirk Shelmerdine (#27), Carl Long (#46), Kenny Wallace (#78), Morgan Shepherd (#89)

- Mark Martin's championship hopes came to an end after being wrecked by J. J. Yeley on lap 243.
- Kurt Busch had his 3rd-place qualifying run disqualified due to an unapproved right rear shock absorber. The team was docked 50 driver and owner points, and fined $25,000. Crew chief Roy McCauley was also suspended for four races.

=== Subway 500 ===
- Complete Results

The Subway 500 was held on October 22 at Martinsville Speedway. Kurt Busch won his sixth pole of the season.

Top-ten results:

1. #48 - Jimmie Johnson •
2. #11 - Denny Hamlin •
3. #43 - Bobby Labonte
4. #20 - Tony Stewart
5. #24 - Jeff Gordon •
6. #42 - Casey Mears
7. #9 - Kasey Kahne •
8. #66 - Jeff Green
9. #29 - Kevin Harvick •
10. #45 - Kyle Petty

Failed to qualify: Mike Bliss (#49), Hermie Sadler (#00), Chad Chaffin (#61), Morgan Shepherd (#89), Ted Christopher (#27), Derrike Cope (#74), Stanton Barrett (#30)

- 2002 Daytona 500 champion Ward Burton returned to racing to drive the Morgan-McClure #4 Chevy after a two-year absence.

=== Bass Pro Shops 500 ===
- Complete Results

The Bass Pro Shops 500 was held at Atlanta Motor Speedway on October 29. Qualifying was rained out, and the starting order was set by owner points, with Matt Kenseth sitting on the pole.

Top-ten results:

1. #20 - Tony Stewart
2. #48 - Jimmie Johnson •
3. #8 - Dale Earnhardt Jr. •
4. #17 - Matt Kenseth •
5. #16 - Greg Biffle
6. #24 - Jeff Gordon •
7. #99 - Carl Edwards
8. #11 - Denny Hamlin •
9. #01 - Joe Nemechek
10. #7 - Robby Gordon*

Failed to qualify: Derrike Cope (#74), Kirk Shelmerdine (#27), Mike Skinner (#72), A. J. Allmendinger (#84)

- In a video replay shown by NBC after the race, it was determined that Robby Gordon deliberately caused a late-race caution by throwing out his rollbar padding, getting a free-pass to the lead lap as a result. Gordon was docked 50 owner and driver points, fined $15,000, and placed on probation until December 31.

=== Dickies 500 ===
- Complete Results

The Dickies 500 was run on November 5 at Texas Motor Speedway. Brian Vickers won the pole.

Top-ten results: (Race distance extended to 339 laps/508.5 miles due to green-white-checkered rule.)

1. #20 - Tony Stewart
2. #48 - Jimmie Johnson •
3. #29 - Kevin Harvick* •
4. #5 - Kyle Busch •
5. #07 - Clint Bowyer
6. #8 - Dale Earnhardt Jr. •
7. #42 - Casey Mears
8. #2 - Kurt Busch
9. #24 - Jeff Gordon •
10. #11 - Denny Hamlin •

Failed to qualify: Chad Chaffin (#34), Bill Elliott (#37), David Ragan (#60), Kevin Lepage (#61), Mike Skinner (#72), Derrike Cope (#74), A. J. Allmendinger (#84)

- Following this race, Craig Curione, the front tire carrier for the #10 Evernham Dodge driven by Scott Riggs, shoved Kevin Harvick, his wife Delana and NASCAR official John Sacco to the pavement after a late-race incident between Harvick and Riggs that led to the green-white-checkered finish. Curione was suspended indefinitely, fined $10,000 by NASCAR, and fired from Evernham, while Sacco suffered a sprained ankle.

=== Checker Auto Parts 500 ===
- Complete Results

The Checker Auto Parts 500 was held at Phoenix International Raceway on November 12. Jeff Gordon won the pole.

Top-ten results:

1. #29 - Kevin Harvick •
2. #48 - Jimmie Johnson•
3. #11 - Denny Hamlin •
4. #24 - Jeff Gordon •
5. #99 - Carl Edwards
6. #6 - Mark Martin •
7. #9 - Kasey Kahne •
8. #2 - Kurt Busch
9. #8 - Dale Earnhardt Jr. •
10. #31 - Jeff Burton •

Failed to qualify: Jason Leffler (#71), Todd Kluever (#06), Morgan Shepherd (#89), Brandon Ash (#02), Kevin Lepage (#34), Kenny Wallace (#78), Derrike Cope (#74), Jeremy Mayfield (#09)

=== Ford 400 ===
- Complete Results

The Ford 400 was run on November 19 at Homestead–Miami Speedway. Kasey Kahne won the pole, and won the Bud Pole Award overall championship for 2006. Jimmie Johnson clinched his first Nextel Cup Championship, winning the title by 56 points over Matt Kenseth.

Top ten results: (Race extended to 268 laps/402 miles due to green-white-checkered rule.)

1. #16 - Greg Biffle
2. #1 - Martin Truex Jr.
3. #11 - Denny Hamlin •
4. #9 - Kasey Kahne •
5. #29 - Kevin Harvick •
6. #17 - Matt Kenseth •
7. #10 - Scott Riggs
8. #99 - Carl Edwards
9. #48 - Jimmie Johnson •
10. #07 - Clint Bowyer

Failed to qualify: Michael Waltrip (#55), Todd Kluever (#06), Ward Burton (#4), Brandon Whitt (#72), Kenny Wallace (#78), Mike Skinner (#27), Derrike Cope (#74), Kevin Lepage (#61), Carl Long (#46), Chad Chaffin (#34), Casey Atwood (#95), David Ragan (#60), Morgan Shepherd (#89) (withdrew after crashing in practice)

- Juan Pablo Montoya, made his Nextel Cup debut in this race. Montoya qualified 29th, but crashed out and finished 34th after contact with Ryan Newman.
- This was the final race to be broadcast by NBC until the 2015 Coke Zero 400, as well as the final race to be commentated by Benny Parsons, who died less than 2 months after this event in early 2007.

== Full Drivers' Championship ==
(key) Bold - Pole position awarded by time. Italics - Pole position set by owner's points standings. * – Most laps led.

Pos.	Driver	DAY	CAL	LVS	ATL	BRI	MAR	TEX	PHO	TAL	RCH	DAR	CLT	DOV	POC	MCH	SON	DAY	CHI	NHA	POC	IND	GLN	MCH	BRI	CAL	RCH	NHA	DOV	KAN	TAL	CLT	MAR	ATL	TEX	PHO	HOM	Pts.
1	Jimmie Johnson	1	2	1	6	30	**3**	11	7	1	12	4	2	6	10	6	10	32	6	9	6	1	17	13	10	11	23	39	13	14*	24	2	1*	2	2	2	9	6475
2	Matt Kenseth	15	1	2*	13	3	24	2	3	6	38	3	5	1	5	13	17	5	22*	14	14	2	21	1*	1	7	8	10	10*	23	4	14	11	4	12	13	6	6419
3	Denny Hamlin **(R)**	30	12	10	31	14	37	4	34	22	2	10	9	11	**1***	12	12	17	14	6	**1***	10	10	9	6	6	**15**	4	9	18	21	28	2	8	10	3	3	6407
4	Kevin Harvick	14	29	11	39	2	7	5	1	23	3*	37	34	3	13	10	24	9	4	5	5	3	1	11	11	15	1	**1***	32	15	6	18	9	31	3	1*	5	6397
5	Dale Earnhardt Jr.	8*	11	27	3	11	4	12	23	31	1	5	11	10	14	3	26	13	5	43	43	6	18	6	3	2	17	13	21	10	23*	4	22	3	6	9	19	6328
6	Jeff Gordon	26	13	5	4	21	2	22	10	15*	40	2	36	12	34	8*	1*	40	1	15	3	16	13	2	5	5	31	3	**3**	39	36	24	5	6	9	4	24	6256
7	Jeff Burton	**32**	5	7	25	34	33	6	9	4	15	9	6	4	9	11	7	15	**2**	7	9	**15***	11	**42**	9*	16	9	7	1	5	27	3	42	13	38	10	14	6228
8	Kasey Kahne	11	4	4	**1**	10	35	**1**	6	39	34	**21**	1*	7	7	**1**	31	25	23	8	31	36	22	4	12	1*	3	16	38	**33**	2	1*	7	38	33	7	**4***	6183
9	Mark Martin	12	9	6	2	6	13	9	11	35	11	8	4	9	17	23	13	33	18	4	19	5	20	5	28	12	5	11	14	3	8	30	24	36	22	6	18	6168
10	Kyle Busch	23	10	3	12	8	5	15	**36**	32	5	7	38	5	22	14	11	2	3	1*	12	7	9	39	2	8	2	38	40	7	11	6	18	27	4	38	38	6027
Chase for the Nextel Cup cut-off
Pos.	Driver	DAY	CAL	LVS	ATL	BRI	MAR	TEX	PHO	TAL	RCH	DAR	CLT	DOV	POC	MCH	SON	DAY	CHI	NHA	POC	IND	GLN	MCH	BRI	CAL	RCH	NHA	DOV	KAN	TAL	CLT	MAR	ATL	TEX	PHO	HOM	Pts.
11	Tony Stewart	5	43	21	5	**12***	1*	3*	2	2	6	12	42	25	3	41	28	1*	32	37	7	8	2	3	22	9	18	2	33	1	22	13	4	1*	1*	14	15	4727
12	Carl Edwards	43	3	26	40	4	16	36	4	8	7	39	3	15	25	2	6	39	20	2	39	9	5	22	7	4	35	18	2	6	9	8	12	7	15	5	8	4428
13	Greg Biffle	31	42*	**8**	16*	7	31	42	15*	38	**4**	1*	7	8	6	4	4	31	11	3	24	33	38	7	19	24	6	14	5	12	41	37	32	5	35	34	1	4075
14	Casey Mears	2	7	9	21	25	27	14	20	20	17	17	23	21	43	7	20	7	25	21	23	23	35	16	17	14	11	21	22	2	30	12	6	28	7	26	32	3914
15	Brian Vickers	7	18	22	23	37	8	43	13	3	37	41	37	23	4	17	14	18	13	17	4	17	16	15	33	41	24	5	29	8	1	10	17	19	**27**	11	21	3906
16	Kurt Busch	38	**16**	**16**	37	1	11	34	24	7	29	19	39	16	2	9	**5**	3	8	38	2	12	**19***	40	**37**	**27**	27	19	4	25	3	32	**27**	14	8	8	43	3900
17	Clint Bowyer **(R)**	6	14	15	27	29	22	19	5	40	10	23	19	17	21	39	16	10	9	27	41	4	14	33	38	3	12	24	8	9	35	23	23	25	5	33	10	3833
18	Ryan Newman	3	20	43	18	9	18	40	39	33	8	6	35	**14**	11	15	2	11	36	**39**	18	13	8	25	8	33	20	12	24	24	13	27	13	30	34	15	23	3748
19	Martin Truex Jr. **(R)**	16	15	20	19	38	19	8	22	36	41	14	21	22	24	16	15	29	16	18	10	19	28	30	18	18	40	22	6	11	5	31	36	37	14	12	2	3673
20	Scott Riggs	DNQ	19	28	11	41	10	7	38	9	14	31	**13**	20	8	29	27	20	15	10	22	21	23	14	4	17	10	35	34	34	19	**17**	30	22	31	22	7	3619
21	Bobby Labonte	35	31	30	43	5	32	10	8	29	24	22	17	13	12	28	35	42	12	23	8	40	24	19	23	26	22	40	7	17	10	5	3	12	16	27	41	3567
22	Elliott Sadler	4	23	14	29	13	6	33	37	**16**	13	29	30	40	20	22	8	6	29	25	32	43	7	10	39	13	16	6	16	40	29	35	38	21	37	17	36	3469
23	Dale Jarrett	10	17	19	9	20	15	17	19	12	21	24	43	24	38	20	34	22	31	31	28	28	26	36	15	10	21	28	15	4	12	41	16	11	29	39	31	3438
24	Reed Sorenson **(R)**	29	21	40	10	22	12	13	40	26	23	11	10	19	36	5	29	34	7	24	26	30	12	8	36	21	14	17	11	43	39	36	35	29	17	29	16	3434
25	Jamie McMurray	37	6	23	14	35	9	37	14	5	19	42	8	2*	18	23	18	8	39	33	20	26	3	17	29	20	25	29	17	42	37	34	19	40	26	40	35	3405
26	Dave Blaney	22	30	31	32	23	17	29	27	24	20	27	32	30	27	30	39	27	17	13	16	29	40	24	14	28	4	9	12	21	28	26	33	18	32	23	26	3259
27	Joe Nemechek	33	27	13	17	28	23	23	35	27	28	16	18	35	29	26	25	19	33	41	17	24	42	26	26	25	32	32	26	27	18	9	20	9	18	19	13	3255
28	Jeff Green	42	24	18	26	15	25	18	18	14	18	32	12	28	37	33	19	26	27	26	35	38	15	27	24	22	41	43	20	30	7	16	8	23	13	37	22	3253
29	J. J. Yeley **(R)**	41	8	17	15	33	20	35	28	11	22	26	20	42	15	40	33	37	10	12	11	34	33	37	31	19	13	8	30	41	32	29	31	16	20	20	30	3220
30	Robby Gordon	13	26	12	28	26	43	20	41	10	39	13	16	36	35	18	40	14	19	19	13	35	4	12	27	43	19	15	41	36	16	25	37	10	39	32	40	3113
31	Ken Schrader	9	28	41	24	24	40	16	16	42	16	15	26	33	30	42	41	12	42	34	15	14	34	18	13	23	7	33	19	13	25	40	41	24	42	24	29	3049
32	Kyle Petty	39	25	29	8	18	30	39	31	18	26	18	25	27	40	35	21	28	28	28	42	27	30	31	34	35	34	37	25	29	38	22	10	17	11	25	28	2938
33	David Stremme **(R)**	28	33	33	33	36	38	21	29	34	33	25	31	41	26	19		16	21	11	29	18		28	35	36	26	20	18	26	33	15	15	39	24	18	11	2865
34	Sterling Marlin	34	32	36	34	17	14	30	12	37	9	28	28	31	42	24	42	24	26	16	30	31	39	29	32	29	30	25	31	20	40	11	21	20	40	36	37	2854
35	Tony Raines						21	24	17	17	30	20	40	26	16	38		21	40	22	21	11		32	25	37	39	26	23	28	20	7	14	34	19	21	20	2609
36	Travis Kvapil	27	DNQ	39	DNQ	40	34	27	21	19	27	30	22	29	19	21	DNQ	30	37	35	27	25		21	20	34	28	27	39	19	DNQ	20	40	32	28	30	27	2451
37	Michael Waltrip	18	36	35	20	32	29	26	42	25	31	35	41	32	28	25	23	38	30	36	40	DNQ	36	23	16	31	DNQ	23	28	35	14	38	34	33	43	42	DNQ	2350
38	Scott Wimmer	DNQ	39	32	30	19	28	28	30	21	36	33	27	34	DNQ	31		DNQ	34	20	38	20	25	DNQ	42	30	29	31	36	DNQ							12	1812
39	Jeremy Mayfield	36	22	25	41	16	26	31	26	13	32	38	15	18	23	36	22	36	24	29	37	41														DNQ	42	1684
40	Kevin Lepage	25	35	37	35	31	DNQ	32	DNQ	28	42	36	DNQ	39	31	34		DNQ	DNQ	30	34	DNQ		41	21	38	33	30	37	DNQ	DNQ	DNQ	43	43	DNQ	DNQ	DNQ	1346
41	Terry Labonte	17	34	24	22	27		23				34	33		39		3		43		25		37			40				38		21			36			1278
42	David Gilliland																32							38	40	32	36	36	27	22	**15**	33	28	15	21	16	33	1178
43	Kenny Wallace	DNQ	41	38	DNQ	DNQ	DNQ	DNQ	25	DNQ	25	DNQ	29	38				DNQ	38	42		32		DNQ	30	39	37	DNQ	DNQ	31	42	DNQ	29	35	30	DNQ	DNQ	984
44	Bill Elliott	19																	35	32		22	27			42				16		DNQ		41	DNQ	31	25	765
45	Paul Menard	DNQ			7								14						DNQ			DNQ	29	20							34				41		17	669
46	Chad Chaffin	DNQ		42	DNQ	DNQ	36	DNQ	DNQ	30	DNQ	DNQ	DNQ	DNQ	33	DNQ		35			DNQ	39		DNQ	DNQ	DNQ	38	34		37	DNQ	DNQ	DNQ		DNQ	35	DNQ	553
47	Boris Said																9	**4**				42	31															415
48	Mike Bliss																														26	42	DNQ	26	23	41	39	387
49	Brent Sherman **(R)**	21	37	34	36	42		DNQ	32	DNQ					DNQ				DNQ																			372
50	Mike Wallace	24								DNQ	35							23							DNQ		DNQ				17							355
51	Stanton Barrett	DNQ	40	DNQ	DNQ	39	39	DNQ	33	DNQ	DNQ	40	DNQ	DNQ	DNQ	Wth	DNQ			40	DNQ				DNQ			DNQ	35				DNQ					343
52	Derrike Cope	DNQ	DNQ	Wth	DNQ	DNQ	DNQ	41	Wth		43	43	QL	37	DNQ	43			DNQ	DNQ	DNQ	DNQ		34	43		DNQ	DNQ	43		43	DNQ	DNQ	DNQ	DNQ	DNQ	DNQ	317
53	Ward Burton																																26		25	28	DNQ	252
54	Hermie Sadler	40	DNQ	DNQ	42	43	DNQ			43	DNQ	Wth	DNQ	43				41						35	DNQ		DNQ				DNQ	DNQ	DNQ					251
55	Scott Pruett																30						6															223
56	Todd Kluever																		41					43		DNQ				32		39				DNQ	DNQ	187
57	Mike Skinner	DNQ		DNQ	DNQ	DNQ										37						37		DNQ	DNQ							43	39	DNQ	DNQ		DNQ	184
58	Kirk Shelmerdine	20								41			DNQ					43													DNQ	DNQ		DNQ				177
59	Todd Bodine																														DNQ	19		42				143
60	Mike Garvey		38		DNQ	DNQ	41	38	DNQ				DNQ		41	DNQ			DNQ																			138
61	Jimmy Spencer		Wth				DNQ								32	DNQ					36																	122
62	Ron Fellows																37						32															119
63	David Ragan																												42				25	Wth	DNQ		DNQ	88
64	Brandon Ash			DNQ					43								38						DNQ													DNQ		88
65	Chad Blount	DNQ			DNQ	DNQ	42	DNQ	DNQ	DNQ		DNQ	DNQ					DNQ	DNQ								42	DNQ	DNQ	DNQ								74
66	Morgan Shepherd	DNQ	DNQ	DNQ		DNQ	DNQ		DNQ	DNQ										DNQ					DNQ		43	42	DNQ			DNQ	DNQ			DNQ	Wth	71
67	Eric McClure																														31							70
68	Bill Lester				38											32										DNQ												67
69	Juan Pablo Montoya																																				34	61
70	P. J. Jones																36																					55
71	Brian Simo																DNQ						41															40
72	Carl Long	DNQ										DNQ	DNQ	DNQ		DNQ			DNQ						41			DNQ		DNQ		DNQ					DNQ	40
73	Ted Christopher																			DNQ							DNQ	41					DNQ					40
74	Tom Hubert																43						DNQ															34
75	Marc Goossens																						43															34
76	Brandon Whitt																																			43	DNQ	34
77	Johnny Sauter												24									DNQ																
78	Stephen Leicht																				33	DNQ																
79	Andy Belmont	DNQ																																				
80	Larry Foyt	DNQ																																				
81	Larry Gunselman	DNQ																		Wth																		
82	Randy LaJoie	DNQ	DNQ	DNQ																																		
83	Greg Sacks				DNQ										DNQ						DNQ																	
84	Steve Portenga								DNQ																													
85	Kertus Davis										DNQ		DNQ					DNQ								DNQ												
86	Donnie Neuenberger													DNQ															DNQ									
87	Johnny Miller																DNQ						DNQ															
88	Chris Cook																DNQ						DNQ															
89	Joey McCarthy																			DNQ																		
90	Bobby Hamilton Jr.			Wth																	Wth	DNQ																
91	Max Papis																						DNQ															
92	David Murry																						DNQ															
93	Dale Quarterley																						DNQ															
94	A. J. Allmendinger																																	DNQ	DNQ			
95	Jason Leffler																																			DNQ		
96	Casey Atwood																																				DNQ	
97	Damon Lusk																				Wth																	
98	Ricky Rudd													QL																								
Pos.	Driver	DAY	CAL	LVS	ATL	BRI	MAR	TEX	PHO	TAL	RCH	DAR	CLT	DOV	POC	MCH	SON	DAY	CHI	NHA	POC	IND	GLN	MCH	BRI	CAL	RCH	NHA	DOV	KAN	TAL	CLT	MAR	ATL	TEX	PHO	HOM	Pts.

== Rookies ==
- Clint Bowyer, No. 07 Chevrolet (Richard Childress Racing)
- Denny Hamlin, No. 11 Chevrolet (Joe Gibbs Racing) --winner of the Raybestos Rookie of the Year award
- David Stremme, No. 40 Dodge (Chip Ganassi Racing with Felix Sabates)
- Martin Truex Jr., No. 1 Chevrolet (Dale Earnhardt, Inc.)
- Brent Sherman, released from No. 49 Dodge (BAM Racing)
- Reed Sorenson, No. 41 Dodge (Chip Ganassi Racing with Felix Sabates)
- J. J. Yeley, No. 18 Chevrolet (Joe Gibbs Racing)

The battle for ROTY was not expected to be fierce, as many predicted that two time Busch Series champion Martin Truex Jr. would handily win the award, and possibly be a Chase contender. However, this was not to be as Joe Gibbs Racing driver Denny Hamlin shocked the NASCAR world the previous year by winning his first career pole at Phoenix while driving a part-time schedule. Hamlin again got everyone's attention by not only having won the Bud Shootout in his first attempt, but became the first rookie to sweep a racetrack (Pocono Raceway) since Jimmie Johnson accomplished that same feat at Dover. As Hamlin ran away with ROTY, his other competitors had up and down years. Truex struggled for much of the year, salvaging a 19th-place points finish despite showing improvements towards the end of the season. Clint Bowyer, despite scoring a surprising Top 10 finish at Daytona, was also not a factor, as his season was largely the same as Truex's. Hamlin's teammate, J. J. Yeley struggled mightily. Ganassi rookie Reed Sorenson had an up and down year, scoring his first top five at Michigan but was plagued by bad breaks. David Stremme was constantly fighting to stay within the top 35 in owners points throughout the year, and Brent Sherman was released from his ride with BAM Racing 1/3 into the year. Thanks to his strong season, Denny Hamlin won the Raybestos Rookie of the Year award.

== NASCAR Hall of Fame ==
Until March 6, 2006, NASCAR was without a recognized Hall of Fame. Charlotte, North Carolina, where most NASCAR teams are based near, was chosen as the location over six other candidates, which included Atlanta, Georgia; Talladega, Alabama; Kansas City, Kansas; Detroit, Michigan; Richmond, Virginia and Daytona Beach, Florida. The NASCAR Hall of Fame opened in 2010.

== Television ==
The 2006 season marked the final year of television contracts with Fox / FX / Speed and NBC / TNT. NBC aired the Daytona 500 to officially start the season on February 19, with Fox/FX picking up coverage the following week in California up to the Pepsi 400 July 1. For 2007, Fox and TNT began new eight-year contracts while ESPN / ABC joined in, taking over for NBC.

== See also ==
- 2006 NASCAR Busch Series
- 2006 NASCAR Craftsman Truck Series
- 2006 ARCA Re/Max Series
- 2006 NASCAR Whelen Modified Tour
- 2006 NASCAR Whelen Southern Modified Tour
