= 2006 Dodge/Save Mart 350 =

Race details
- Race 16 of 36 in the 2006 NASCAR Nextel Cup Series
- 2006 Dodge/Save Mart 350 program cover
- Date: June 25, 2006
- Official name: Dodge/Save Mart 350
- Location: Infineon Raceway, Sonoma, California
- Course: Permanent racing facility
- Course length: 1.99 miles (3.202 km)
- Distance: 110 laps, 218.9 mi (352.285 km)
- Average speed: 73.953 miles per hour (119.016 km/h)
- Attendance: 102,000

Pole position
Driver	Kurt Busch	Roush Racing
- Time: 76.987

Most laps led
Driver	Jeff Gordon	Hendrick Motorsports
- Laps: 44

Winner
No. 24	Jeff Gordon	Hendrick Motorsports

Television in the United States
- Network: Fox
- Announcers: Mike Joy, Larry McReynolds, Darrell Waltrip

Radio in the United States
- Radio: Performance Racing Network

The 2006 Dodge/Save Mart 350 was a NASCAR Nextel Cup Series stock car race held on June 25, 2006 at Infineon Raceway in Sonoma, California. Contested over 110 laps on a 1.99-mile (3.20-kilometre) road course, it was the 16th race of the 2006 NASCAR Nextel Cup Series season. Jeff Gordon of Hendrick Motorsports won the race, which was the 100th road course race in Cup Series history.

That was last Sonoma race of Kyle Petty and Jeremy Mayfield.

== Background ==
The course, Infineon Raceway (now called Sonoma Raceway), is one of two road courses to hold NASCAR races, the other is Watkins Glen International. The standard road course at Infineon Raceway is a twelve-turn course that is 2.52 miles (4.06 kilometres) long; the track was modified in 1998, adding the Chute, which bypassed turns five and six, shortening the course to 1.95 miles (3.14 kilometres). The Chute was only used for NASCAR events such as this race, and was criticized by many drivers, who preferred the full layout. In 2001, it was replaced with a 70-degree turn, 4A, bringing the track to its current dimensions of 1.99 miles (3.20 kilometres).

== Qualifying ==
Pos	Car #	Driver	Make	Primary Sponsor	Speed	Time	Behind
1	2	Kurt Busch	Dodge	Miller Lite	93.055	76.987	0.000
2	26	Jamie McMurray	Ford	Crown Royal	92.948	77.075	-0.088
3	29	Kevin Harvick	Chevrolet	GM Goodwrench	92.889	77.124	-0.137
4	12	Ryan Newman	Dodge	Alltel	92.812	77.188	-0.201
5	60	Boris Said	Ford	SOBE - No Fear	92.663	77.312	-0.325
6	9	Kasey Kahne	Dodge	Dodge Dealers / UAW / SRT	92.495	77.453	-0.466
7	16	Greg Biffle	Ford	National Guard	92.308	77.610	-0.623
8	6	Mark Martin	Ford	AAA	92.295	77.621	-0.634
9	17	Matt Kenseth	Ford	DEWALT	92.226	77.679	-0.692
10	1	Joe Nemechek	Chevrolet	U.S. Army	92.158	77.736	-0.749
11	24	Jeff Gordon	Chevrolet	DuPont	92.086	77.797	-0.810
12	20	Tony Stewart	Chevrolet	The Home Depot	92.076	77.805	-0.818
13	31	Jeff Burton	Chevrolet	Cingular Wireless	92.027	77.847	-0.860
14	7	Robby Gordon	Chevrolet	Menards / Energizer	92.025	77.848	-0.861
15	4	PJ Jones	Chevrolet	AERO Exhaust	92.020	77.853	-0.866
16	48	Jimmie Johnson	Chevrolet	Lowe's	91.893	77.960	-0.973
17	32	Ron Fellows	Chevrolet	Tide-Downy	91.859	77.989	-1.002
18	21	Ken Schrader	Ford	Little Debbie	91.837	78.008	-1.021
19	5	Kyle Busch	Chevrolet	Kellogg's	91.821	78.021	-1.034
20	99	Carl Edwards	Ford	Office Depot	91.726	78.102	-1.115
21	43	Bobby Labonte	Dodge	Cheerios / Betty Crocker	91.684	78.138	-1.151
22	88	Dale Jarrett	Ford	UPS	91.644	78.172	-1.185
23	66	Jeff Green	Chevrolet	Best Buy / SanDisk	91.586	78.222	-1.235
24	38	Elliott Sadler	Ford	Pedigree	91.559	78.245	-1.258
25	10	Scott Riggs	Dodge	Valvoline / Stanley Tools	91.483	78.310	-1.323
26	8	Dale Earnhardt Jr	Chevrolet	Budweiser	91.445	78.342	-1.355
27	40	Scott Pruett	Dodge	Coors Light	91.382	78.396	-1.409
28	7	Clint Bowyer	Chevrolet	Jack Daniel's	91.381	78.397	-1.410
29	14	Sterling Marlin	Chevrolet	Waste Management	91.308	78.460	-1.473
30	27	Tom Hubert	Ford	Kirk Shelmerdine Racing	91.265	78.497	-1.510
31	72	David Gilliland	Dodge	Dutch Quality Stone	91.132	78.611	-1.624
32	19	Jeremy Mayfield	Dodge	Dodge Dealers / UAW / SRT	91.067	78.667	-1.680
33	45	Kyle Petty	Dodge	Wells Fargo	91.012	78.715	-1.728
34	42	Casey Mears	Dodge	Texaco / Havoline	91.010	78.717	-1.730
35	55	Michael Waltrip	Dodge	NAPA Auto Parts	90.929	78.787	-1.800
36	22	Dave Blaney	Dodge	Caterpillar	90.825	78.877	-1.890
37	96	Terry Labonte	Chevrolet	DLP HDTV	90.684	79.000	-2.013
38	18	JJ Yeley	Chevrolet	Interstate Batteries	90.306	79.330	-2.343
39	1	Martin Truex Jr	Chevrolet	Bass Pro Shops / Tracker	90.251	79.379	-2.392
40	11	Denny Hamlin	Chevrolet	FedEx Freight	90.186	79.436	-2.449
41	41	Reed Sorenson	Dodge	Target	90.028	79.575	-2.588
42	25	Brian Vickers	Chevrolet	GMAC	88.497	80.952	-3.965
43	02	Brandon Ash	Dodge	Sprinter Trucking Inc.	90.715	78.973	-1.986
Failed to qualify
44	34	Johnny Miller	Chevrolet	Oak Glove Co.		79.115	
45	49	Chris Cook	Dodge	DSI		79.918	
46	78	Travis Kvapil	Chevrolet	Furniture Row Racing		79.981	
47	95	Stanton Barrett	Chevrolet	Interush		80.106	
48	61	Brian Simo	Chevrolet	Front Row Motorsports		81.143	

== Results ==
POS	ST	#	DRIVER	SPONSOR / OWNER	CAR	LAPS	MONEY	STATUS	LED	PTS
1	11	24	Jeff Gordon	DuPont (Rick Hendrick)	Chevrolet	110	325661	running	44	190
2	4	12	Ryan Newman	Alltel (Roger Penske)	Dodge	110	219758	running	11	175
3	37	96	Terry Labonte	DLP HDTV (Bill Saunders)	Chevrolet	110	155825	running	17	170
4	7	16	Greg Biffle	National Guard (Jack Roush)	Ford	110	147300	running	0	160
5	1	2	Kurt Busch	Miller Lite (Roger Penske)	Dodge	110	145433	running	29	160
6	20	99	Carl Edwards	Office Depot (Jack Roush)	Ford	110	116800	running	0	150
7	13	31	Jeff Burton	Cingular Wireless (Richard Childress)	Chevrolet	110	122120	running	0	146
8	24	38	Elliott Sadler	Pedigree (Yates Racing)	Ford	110	118583	running	0	142
9	5	60	Boris Said	SOBE - No Fear (Mark Simo)	Ford	110	83825	running	1	143
10	16	48	Jimmie Johnson	Lowe's (Rick Hendrick)	Chevrolet	110	144186	running	2	139
11	19	5	Kyle Busch	Kellogg's (Rick Hendrick)	Chevrolet	110	97575	running	0	130
12	40	11	Denny Hamlin	FedEx Freight (Joe Gibbs)	Chevrolet	110	85075	running	0	127
13	8	6	Mark Martin	AAA (Jack Roush)	Ford	110	96725	running	0	124
14	42	25	Brian Vickers	GMAC (Rick Hendrick)	Chevrolet	110	89025	running	0	121
15	39	1	Martin Truex, Jr.	Bass Pro Shops / Tracker (Dale Earnhardt, Inc.)	Chevrolet	110	108283	running	0	118
16	28	07	Clint Bowyer	Jack Daniel's (Richard Childress)	Chevrolet	110	87875	running	0	115
17	9	17	Matt Kenseth	DeWalt (Jack Roush)	Ford	110	120791	running	0	112
18	2	26	Jamie McMurray	Crown Royal (Jack Roush)	Ford	110	121825	running	0	109
19	23	66	Jeff Green	Best Buy / SanDisk (Gene Haas)	Chevrolet	110	102833	running	0	106
20	34	42	Casey Mears	Texaco / Havoline (Chip Ganassi)	Dodge	110	113708	running	0	103
21	33	45	Kyle Petty	Wells Fargo (Petty Enterprises)	Dodge	110	98258	running	0	100
22	32	19	Jeremy Mayfield	Dodge Dealers / UAW / SRT (Ray Evernham)	Dodge	110	105441	running	0	97
23	35	55	Michael Waltrip	NAPA Auto Parts (Doug Bawel)	Dodge	110	87433	running	0	94
24	3	29	Kevin Harvick	GM Goodwrench (Richard Childress)	Chevrolet	110	111611	running	5	96
25	10	01	Joe Nemechek	U.S. Army (Nelson Bowers)	Chevrolet	110	100295	running	0	88
26	26	8	Dale Earnhardt, Jr.	Budweiser (Dale Earnhardt, Inc.)	Chevrolet	110	107916	running	0	85
27	25	10	Scott Riggs	Valvoline / Stanley Tools (James Rocco)	Dodge	110	72300	running	0	82
28	12	20	Tony Stewart	The Home Depot (Joe Gibbs)	Chevrolet	110	122561	running	1	84
29	41	41	Reed Sorenson	Target (Chip Ganassi)	Dodge	110	79500	running	0	76
30	27	40	Scott Pruett	Coors Light (Chip Ganassi)	Dodge	110	89422	running	0	73
31	6	9	Kasey Kahne	Dodge Dealers / UAW / SRT (Ray Evernham)	Dodge	110	110914	running	0	70
32	31	72	David Gilliland	Dutch Quality Stone (Bryan Mullet)	Dodge	108	68050	running	0	67
33	38	18	J.J. Yeley	Interstate Batteries (Joe Gibbs)	Chevrolet	104	105965	crash	0	64
34	22	88	Dale Jarrett	UPS (Yates Racing)	Ford	104	99905	crash	0	61
35	21	43	Bobby Labonte	Cheerios / Betty Crocker (Petty Enterprises)	Dodge	104	104656	crash	0	58
36	15	4	P.J. Jones	AERO Exhaust (Larry McClure)	Chevrolet	101	67610	rear end	0	55
37	17	32	Ron Fellows	Tide / Downy (Cal Wells)	Chevrolet	100	67475	running	0	52
38	43	02	Brandon Ash	Sprinter Trucking, Inc. (Ed Ash)	Dodge	85	67360	running	0	49
39	36	22	Dave Blaney	Caterpillar (Bill Davis)	Dodge	79	67250	driveshaft	0	46
40	14	7	Robby Gordon	Menards / Energizer (Robby Gordon)	Chevrolet	74	67125	crash	0	43
41	18	21	Ken Schrader	Little Debbie (Wood Brothers)	Ford	0	94214	crash	0	40
42	29	14	Sterling Marlin	Waste Management (Nelson Bowers)	Chevrolet	0	66900	crash	0	37
43	30	27	Tom Hubert	Interush (Kirk Shelmerdine)	Ford	0	67116	crash	0	34
Failed to qualify, withdrew, or driver changes:
POS	NAME	NBR	SPONSOR	OWNER	CAR					
44	Johnny Miller	34	Oak Glove Co.	Bob Jenkins	Chevrolet					
45	Chris Cook	49	DSI	Beth Ann Morgenthau	Dodge					
46	Travis Kvapil	78	Furniture Row Racing	Barney Visser	Chevrolet					
47	Stanton Barrett	95	Interush	Stanton Barrett	Chevrolet					
48	Brian Simo	61	Front Row Motorsports	Bob Jenkins	Chevrolet					

== Race statistics ==
- Time of race: 2:57:36
- Average speed: 73.953 miles per hour (119.016 km/h)
- Pole speed: 93.055 miles per hour (149.758 km/h)
- Cautions: 7 for 12 laps
- Margin of victory: 1.250 seconds
- Lead changes: 9
- Percent of race run under caution: 10.9%
- Average green flag run: 12.2 laps

Previous race: 2006 3M Performance 400	Nextel Cup Series; 2006 season	Next race: 2006 Pepsi 400
