= 2006 Sharpie 500 =

Race details
- Race 24 of 36 in the 2006 NASCAR Nextel Cup Series season
- 2006 Sharpie 500 program cover, with artwork made by Sam Bass. The painting is called "Moonlight Thunder!"
- Date: August 26, 2006
- Official name: Sharpie 500
- Location: Bristol Motor Speedway, Bristol, Tennessee
- Course: Permanent racing facility
- Course length: 0.533 miles (0.857 km)
- Distance: 500 laps, 266.5 mi (428.89 km)
- Average speed: 90.025 miles per hour (144.881 km/h)

Pole position
Driver	Kurt Busch	Penske Racing South

Most laps led
Driver	Jeff Burton	Richard Childress Racing
- Laps: 263

Winner
No. 17	Matt Kenseth	Roush Racing

Television in the United States
- Network: NBC
- Announcers: Bill Weber, Benny Parsons, Wally Dallenbach Jr.

The 2006 Sharpie 500 was a NASCAR Winston Cup Series race held on August 26, 2006, at Bristol Motor Speedway, in Bristol, Tennessee. Contested over 500 laps on the 0.533 mile (0.857 km) concrete short track, it was the 24th race of the 2006 NASCAR Nextel Cup Series season. Matt Kenseth of Roush Racing won the race.

== Qualifying ==
Pos	Car #	Driver	Make	Speed	Time	Behind
1	2	Kurt Busch	Dodge	124.906	15.362	0.000
2	31	Jeff Burton	Chevrolet	124.808	15.374	-0.012
3	43	Bobby Labonte	Dodge	124.484	15.414	-0.052
4	17	Matt Kenseth	Ford	124.404	15.424	-0.062
5	20	Tony Stewart	Chevrolet	124.299	15.437	-0.075
6	11	Denny Hamlin	Chevrolet	124.226	15.446	-0.084
7	29	Kevin Harvick	Chevrolet	124.106	15.461	-0.099
8	45	Kyle Petty	Dodge	124.082	15.464	-0.102
9	19	Elliott Sadler	Dodge	123.922	15.484	-0.122
10	41	Reed Sorenson	Dodge	123.906	15.486	-0.124
11	42	Casey Mears	Dodge	123.866	15.491	-0.129
12	49	Kevin Lepage	Dodge	123.770	15.503	-0.141
13	24	Jeff Gordon	Chevrolet	123.754	15.505	-0.143
14	14	Sterling Marlin	Chevrolet	123.714	15.510	-0.148
15	6	Mark Martin	Ford	123.698	15.512	-0.150
16	66	Jeff Green	Chevrolet	123.610	15.523	-0.161
17	21	Ken Schrader	Ford	123.594	15.525	-0.163
18	48	Jimmie Johnson	Chevrolet	123.586	15.526	-0.164
19	5	Kyle Busch	Chevrolet	123.491	15.538	-0.176
20	25	Brian Vickers	Chevrolet	123.475	15.540	-0.178
21	12	Ryan Newman	Dodge	123.467	15.541	-0.179
22	22	Dave Blaney	Dodge	123.467	15.541	-0.179
23	10	Scott Riggs	Dodge	123.443	15.544	-0.182
24	1	Martin Truex Jr	Chevrolet	123.380	15.552	-0.190
25	18	JJ Yeley	Chevrolet	123.356	15.555	-0.193
26	78	Kenny Wallace	Chevrolet	123.277	15.565	-0.203
27	7	Clint Bowyer	Chevrolet	123.213	15.573	-0.211
28	32	Travis Kvapil	Chevrolet	123.134	15.583	-0.221
29	55	Michael Waltrip	Dodge	123.000	15.600	-0.238
30	34	Carl Long	Chevrolet	122.921	15.610	-0.248
31	9	Kasey Kahne	Dodge	122.827	15.622	-0.260
32	88	Dale Jarrett	Ford	122.717	15.636	-0.274
33	74	Derrike Cope	Dodge	122.701	15.638	-0.276
34	96	Tony Raines	Chevrolet	122.638	15.646	-0.284
35	16	Greg Biffle	Ford	122.365	15.681	-0.319
36	40	David Stremme	Dodge	122.295	15.690	-0.328
37	26	Jamie McMurray	Ford	122.201	15.702	-0.340
38	38	David Gilliland	Ford	122.154	15.708	-0.346
39	99	Carl Edwards	Ford	122.092	15.716	-0.354
40	8	Dale Earnhardt Jr	Chevrolet	121.728	15.763	-0.401
41	1	Joe Nemechek	Chevrolet	121.428	15.802	-0.440
42	7	Robby Gordon	Chevrolet	121.389	15.807	-0.445
43	4	Scott Wimmer	Chevrolet	122.451	15.670	-0.308
Failed to qualify
44	61	Chad Chaffin	Chevrolet		15.726	
45	00	Hermie Sadler	Chevrolet		15.746	
46	37	Mike Skinner	Dodge		15.759	
47	09	Mike Wallace	Dodge		15.820	
48	30	Stanton Barrett	Dodge			
49	89	Morgan Shepherd	Dodge			
Official qualifying results

== Race recap ==
The Sharpie 500, one of the most popular races on the circuit and NASCAR's twenty-fourth race of the season, was held on August 26, 2006, under the lights on the 0.533-mile Bristol International Speedway. Kurt Busch won the pole for this event. Matt Kenseth won his second straight Nextel Cup race and, along with points leader Jimmie Johnson, clinched a berth in the Chase for the Nextel Cup.

== Results ==
Pos	St	No.	Driver	Car	Laps	Money	Status	Led	Points
1	4	17	Matt Kenseth	Ford	500	336516	running	117	185
2	19	5	Kyle Busch	Chevrolet	500	202375	running	1	175
3	40	8	Dale Earnhardt Jr.	Chevrolet	500	199591	running	35	170
4	23	10	Scott Riggs	Dodge	500	135425	running	0	160
5	13	24	Jeff Gordon	Chevrolet	500	171636	running	41	160
6	6	11	Denny Hamlin	Chevrolet	500	111800	running	0	150
7	39	99	Carl Edwards	Ford	500	128200	running	16	151
8	21	12	Ryan Newman	Dodge	500	144808	running	0	142
9	2	31	Jeff Burton	Chevrolet	500	145720	running	263	148
10	18	48	Jimmie Johnson	Chevrolet	500	147686	running	0	134
11	7	29	Kevin Harvick	Chevrolet	500	135486	running	0	130
12	31	9	Kasey Kahne	Dodge	500	131264	running	0	127
13	17	21	Ken Schrader	Ford	500	124564	running	0	124
14	22	22	Dave Blaney	Dodge	500	113758	running	0	121
15	32	88	Dale Jarrett	Ford	499	128075	running	0	118
16	29	55	Michael Waltrip	Dodge	499	110183	running	0	115
17	11	42	Casey Mears	Dodge	499	127533	running	0	112
18	24	1	Martin Truex Jr.	Chevrolet	499	114858	running	0	109
19	35	16	Greg Biffle	Ford	499	108775	running	0	106
20	28	32	Travis Kvapil	Chevrolet	499	105983	running	0	103
21	12	49	Kevin Lepage	Dodge	498	96922	running	0	100
22	5	20	Tony Stewart	Chevrolet	498	140761	running	0	97
23	3	43	Bobby Labonte	Dodge	498	126886	running	0	94
24	16	66	Jeff Green	Chevrolet	498	96975	running	0	91
25	34	96	Tony Raines	Chevrolet	498	89700	running	0	88
26	41	01	Joe Nemechek	Chevrolet	498	113665	running	0	85
27	42	7	Robby Gordon	Chevrolet	498	86705	running	0	82
28	15	6	Mark Martin	Ford	496	101195	running	0	79
29	37	26	Jamie McMurray	Ford	496	129910	running	0	76
30	26	78	Kenny Wallace	Chevrolet	493	83475	running	0	73
31	25	18	J. J. Yeley	Chevrolet	492	129440	running	0	70
32	14	14	Sterling Marlin	Chevrolet	490	85255	running	0	67
33	20	25	Brian Vickers	Chevrolet	487	91595	running	0	64
34	8	45	Kyle Petty	Dodge	481	90535	running	0	61
35	36	40	David Stremme	Dodge	468	90425	running	0	58
36	10	41	Reed Sorenson	Dodge	460	90315	running	0	55
37	1	2	Kurt Busch	Dodge	446	128413	running	27	57
38	27	07	Clint Bowyer	Chevrolet	415	90070	running	0	49
39	9	19	Elliott Sadler	Dodge	395	111951	crash	0	46
40	38	38	David Gilliland	Ford	346	109758	running	0	43
41	30	34	Carl Long	Chevrolet	256	81700	electrical	0	40
42	43	4	Scott Wimmer	Chevrolet	209	81575	engine	0	37
43	33	74	Derrike Cope	Dodge	7	81764	handling	0	34

== Race Statistics ==
- Time of race: 2:57:37
- Average Speed: 90.025 miles per hour (144.881 km/h)
- Pole Speed: 124.906 miles per hour (201.017 km/h)
- Cautions: 10 for 62 laps
- Margin of Victory: 0.591 sec
- Lead changes: 18
- Percent of race run under caution: 12.4%
- Average green flag run: 39.8 laps

Previous race: 2006 GFS Marketplace 400	Nextel Cup Series; 2006 season	Next race: 2006 Sony HD 500
