= 2006 Chevy Rock & Roll 400 =

Race details
- Race 26 of 36 in the 2006 NASCAR Nextel Cup Series
- 2006 Chevy Rock & Roll 400 program cover
- Date: September 9, 2006
- Location: Richmond International Raceway in Richmond, Virginia
- Course: Permanent racing facility
- Course length: 0.75 miles (1.207 km)
- Distance: 400 laps, 300 mi (482.803 km)
- Average speed: 101.342 mph (163.094 km/h)

Pole position
Driver	Denny Hamlin	Joe Gibbs Racing
- Time: 21.096

Most laps led
Driver	Kyle Busch	Hendrick Motorsports
- Laps: 248

Winner
No. 29	Kevin Harvick	Richard Childress Racing

Television in the United States
- Network: TNT
- Announcers: Bill Weber, Benny Parsons, & Wally Dallenbach Jr.

The 2006 Chevy Rock & Roll 400 was a NASCAR Nextel Cup Series race held on September 9, 2006, at Richmond International Raceway in Richmond, Virginia. Contested over 400 laps on the 0.75-mile (1.21-kilometre) short track, it was the 26th race of the 2006 NASCAR Nextel Cup Series season. Kevin Harvick of Richard Childress Racing won the race.

== Background ==
In 1953, Richmond International Raceway hosted its first Grand National Series race, which was won by Lee Petty. The original track was paved in 1968, and in 1988, the track was re-designed into a D-shaped configuration, during the spring and fall races.

The name for the raceway complex was "Strawberry Hill" until the Virginia State Fairgrounds site was bought out in 1999 and renamed the "Richmond International Raceway".

== Qualifying ==
ST	Car #	Driver	Make	Primary Sponsor	SPD Q	Time	BHND
1	11	Denny Hamlin	Chevrolet	FedEx	127.986	21.096	0.000
2	31	Jeff Burton	Chevrolet	Cingular Wireless	127.805	21.126	00.030
3	24	Jeff Gordon	Chevrolet	DuPont	127.690	21.145	00.049
4	6	Mark Martin	Ford	AAA	127.407	21.192	00.096
5	29	Kevin Harvick	Chevrolet	GM Goodwrench / Barenaked Ladies	127.316	21.207	00.111
6	4	Scott Wimmer	Chevrolet	Lucas Oil Products	127.215	21.224	00.128
7	1	Martin Truex Jr	Chevrolet	Bass Pro Shops / Tracker	127.065	21.249	00.153
8	16	Greg Biffle	Ford	National Guard	127.041	21.253	00.157
9	99	Carl Edwards	Ford	Office Depot	127.023	21.256	00.160
10	17	Matt Kenseth	Ford	DeWalt	126.981	21.263	00.167
11	40	David Stremme	Dodge	Lone Star Steakhouse & Saloon	126.886	21.279	00.183
12	5	Kyle Busch	Chevrolet	Kellogg's	126.856	21.284	00.188
13	42	Casey Mears	Dodge	Texaco / Havoline	126.856	21.284	00.188
14	19	Elliott Sadler	Dodge	Dodge Dealers / UAW	126.814	21.291	00.195
15	22	Dave Blaney	Dodge	CAT Engines with ACERT Technology	126.725	21.306	00.210
16	07	Clint Bowyer	Chevrolet	Jack Daniel's	126.529	21.339	00.243
17	21	Ken Schrader	Ford	U.S. Air Force	126.505	21.343	00.247
18	2	Kurt Busch	Dodge	Miller Lite	126.434	21.355	00.259
19	48	Jimmie Johnson	Chevrolet	Lowe's	126.286	21.380	00.284
20	9	Kasey Kahne	Dodge	Dodge Dealers / UAW	126.210	21.393	00.297
21	01	Joe Nemechek	Chevrolet	U.S. Army	126.180	21.398	00.302
22	88	Dale Jarrett	Ford	UPS Freight	126.133	21.406	00.310
23	12	Ryan Newman	Dodge	ALLTEL Fastap	126.056	21.419	00.323
24	38	David Gilliland	Ford	M&M's	126.021	21.425	00.329
25	96	Tony Raines	Chevrolet	DLP HDTV	125.945	21.438	00.342
26	10	Scott Riggs	Dodge	Auto Value / Bumper to Bumper	125.904	21.445	00.349
27	43	Bobby Labonte	Dodge	STP Oil Stabilizer	125.728	21.475	00.379
28	14	Sterling Marlin	Chevrolet	Waste Management	125.687	21.482	00.386
29	41	Reed Sorenson	Dodge	Nicorette Fresh Mint Gum	125.634	21.491	00.395
30	26	Jamie McMurray	Ford	Irwin Industrial Tools	125.552	21.505	00.409
31	32	Travis Kvapil	Chevrolet	Tide / Downy	125.500	21.514	00.418
32	18	JJ Yeley	Chevrolet	Interstate Batteries	125.436	21.525	00.429
33	8	Dale Earnhardt Jr	Chevrolet	Budweiser	125.401	21.531	00.435
34	66	Jeff Green	Chevrolet	AOL.com / Goldrush - Best Buy	125.395	21.532	00.436
35	34	Chad Blount	Chevrolet	Oak Glove Company	125.075	21.587	00.491
36	7	Robby Gordon	Chevrolet	Jim Bean Black	125.046	21.592	00.496
37	25	Brian Vickers	Chevrolet	GMAC/O.A.R.	125.035	21.594	00.498
38	45	Kyle Petty	Dodge	Marathon Oil	125.029	21.595	00.499
39	49	Kevin Lepage	Dodge	LoansDepot.com/CarMax	124.861	21.624	00.528
40	20	Tony Stewart	Chevrolet	Home Depot	124.642	21.662	00.566
41	78	Kenny Wallace	Chevrolet	Furniture Row Racing	124.585	21.672	00.576
42	61	Chad Chaffin	Dodge	Makoto Ginger Dressing	124.487	21.689	00.593
43	89	Morgan Shepherd	Dodge	Victory in Jesus	124.229	21.734	00.638
Failed to qualify, withdrew, or driver changes:
44	74	Derrike Cope	Dodge	Sundance Vacations / Royal Admin.		21.781	
45	09	Mike Wallace	Dodge	Miccosukee Gaming & Resorts		21.831	
46	55	Michael Waltrip	Dodge	NAPA Auto Parts		21.854	
47	00	Hermie Sadler	Chevrolet	Richmond Electrical Supply Co.		22.133	
48	27	Ted Christopher	Chevrolet	Lilly Trucking of Virginia		24.296	

== Results ==
POS	ST	#	DRIVER	SPONSOR / OWNER	CAR	LAPS	MONEY	STATUS	LED	PTS
1	5	29	Kevin Harvick	GM Goodwrench / Barenaked Ladies (Richard Childress)	Chevrolet	400	234136	running	54	185
2	12	5	Kyle Busch	Kellogg's (Rick Hendrick)	Chevrolet	400	184550	running	248	180
3	20	9	Kasey Kahne	Dodge Dealers / UAW (Ray Evernham)	Dodge	400	158639	running	1	170
4	15	22	Dave Blaney	CAT Engines with ACERT Technology (Bill Davis)	Dodge	400	130983	running	0	160
5	4	6	Mark Martin	AAA (Jack Roush)	Ford	400	116000	running	0	155
6	8	16	Greg Biffle	National Guard (Jack Roush)	Ford	400	107425	running	0	150
7	17	21	Ken Schrader	U.S. Air Force (Wood Brothers)	Ford	400	121039	running	10	151
8	10	17	Matt Kenseth	DeWalt (Jack Roush)	Ford	400	122916	running	39	147
9	2	31	Jeff Burton	Cingular Wireless (Richard Childress)	Chevrolet	400	104995	running	25	143
10	26	10	Scott Riggs	Auto Value / Bumper to Bumper (James Rocco)	Dodge	400	81750	running	0	134
11	13	42	Casey Mears	Texaco / Havoline (Chip Ganassi)	Dodge	400	110208	running	0	130
12	16	07	Clint Bowyer	Jack Daniel's (Richard Childress)	Chevrolet	400	83975	running	0	127
13	32	18	J.J. Yeley	Imitrex / GSK (Joe Gibbs)	Chevrolet	400	108325	running	0	124
14	29	41	Reed Sorenson	Nicorette Fresh Mint Gum (Chip Ganassi)	Dodge	400	79500	running	0	121
15	1	11	Denny Hamlin	FedEx Ground (Joe Gibbs)	Chevrolet	399	87525	running	19	123
16	14	19	Elliott Sadler	Dodge Dealers / UAW (Ray Evernham)	Dodge	399	99966	running	0	115
17	33	8	Dale Earnhardt, Jr.	Budweiser (Dale Earnhardt, Inc.)	Chevrolet	399	104666	running	0	112
18	40	20	Tony Stewart	The Home Depot (Joe Gibbs)	Chevrolet	399	124961	running	0	109
19	36	7	Robby Gordon	Jim Beam Black (Robby Gordon)	Chevrolet	399	69300	running	0	106
20	23	12	Ryan Newman	Alltel Fastap (Roger Penske)	Dodge	399	111733	running	0	103
21	22	88	Dale Jarrett	UPS Freight (Yates Racing)	Ford	399	103275	running	0	100
22	27	43	Bobby Labonte	STP Oil Stabilizer (Petty Enterprises)	Dodge	399	105661	running	0	97
23	19	48	Jimmie Johnson	Lowe's (Rick Hendrick)	Chevrolet	399	114836	running	4	99
24	37	25	Brian Vickers	GMAC / O.A.R. (Rick Hendrick)	Chevrolet	398	76400	running	0	91
25	30	26	Jamie McMurray	Irwin Industrial Tools (Jack Roush)	Ford	398	112275	running	0	88
26	11	40	David Stremme	Lone Star Steakhouse & Saloon (Chip Ganassi)	Dodge	398	92058	running	0	85
27	18	2	Kurt Busch	Miller Lite (Roger Penske)	Dodge	398	105808	running	0	82
28	31	32	Travis Kvapil	Tide / Downy (Cal Wells)	Chevrolet	398	81808	running	0	79
29	6	4	Scott Wimmer	Lucas Oil Products (Larry McClure)	Chevrolet	398	67025	running	0	76
30	28	14	Sterling Marlin	Waste Management (Bobby Ginn)	Chevrolet	398	76558	running	0	73
31	3	24	Jeff Gordon	DuPont (Rick Hendrick)	Chevrolet	398	112611	running	0	70
32	21	01	Joe Nemechek	U.S. Army (Bobby Ginn)	Chevrolet	398	90495	running	0	67
33	39	49	Kevin Lepage	RoadLoans / CarMax (Beth Ann Morgenthau)	Dodge	397	74522	running	0	64
34	38	45	Kyle Petty	Marathon American Spirit Motor Oil (Petty Enterprises)	Dodge	397	71900	running	0	61
35	9	99	Carl Edwards	Office Depot (Jack Roush)	Ford	397	83550	running	0	58
36	24	38	David Gilliland	M&M's (Yates Racing)	Ford	396	91508	running	0	55
37	41	78	Kenny Wallace	Furniture Row Racing (Barney Visser)	Chevrolet	395	63475	running	0	52
38	42	61	Chad Chaffin	Makoto Ginger Dressing (Jeff Stec)	Dodge	392	63350	running	0	49
39	25	96	Tony Raines	DLP HDTV (Bill Saunders)	Chevrolet	390	63225	running	0	46
40	7	1	Martin Truex, Jr.	Bass Pro Shops / Tracker (Dale Earnhardt, Inc.)	Chevrolet	278	71100	crash	0	43
41	34	66	Jeff Green	AOL.com / Goldrush - Best Buy (Gene Haas)	Chevrolet	273	70960	parked	0	40
42	35	34	Chad Blount	Oak Glove Co. (Bob Jenkins)	Chevrolet	98	62835	suspension	0	37
43	43	89	Morgan Shepherd	Victory In Jesus (Morgan Shepherd)	Dodge	18	62689	brakes	0	34
Failed to qualify, withdrew, or driver changes:
POS	NAME	NBR	SPONSOR	OWNER	CAR					
44	Derrike Cope	74	Sundance Vacations / Royal Admin.	Raynard McGlynn	Dodge					
45	Mike Wallace	09	Miccosukee Gaming & Resorts	James Finch	Dodge					
46	Michael Waltrip	55	NAPA Auto Parts	Doug Bawel	Dodge					
47	Hermie Sadler	00	Richmond Electrical Supply Co.	Mike Anderson	Chevrolet					
48	Ted Christopher	27	Lilly Trucking of Virginia	Kirk Shelmerdine	Chevrolet					

== Race statistics ==
- Time of race: 2:57:37
- Average speed: 101.342 miles per hour (163.094 km/h)
- Pole speed: 127.986 miles per hour (205.974 km/h)
- Cautions: 7 for 48 laps
- Margin of victory: 0.153 seconds
- Lead changes: 16
- Percent of race run under caution: 12%
- Average green flag run: 44 laps

Previous race: 2006 Sony HD 500	Nextel Cup Series; 2006 season	Next race: 2006 Sylvania 300
