= 2006 Lenox Industrial Tools 300 =

Race details
- Race 19 of 36 in the 2006 NASCAR Nextel Cup Series
- 2006 Lenox Industrial Tools 300 program cover
- Date: July 16, 2006
- Location: New Hampshire International Speedway, Loudon, New Hampshire
- Course: Permanent racing facility
- Course length: 1.058 miles (1.703 km)
- Distance: 308 laps, 325.864 mi (524.427 km)
- Scheduled distance: 300 laps, 317.4 mi (510.806 km)
- Weather: Temperatures approaching 91.9 °F (33.3 °C); wind speeds up to 10.2 miles per hour (16.4 km/h)
- Average speed: 101.384 miles per hour (163.162 km/h)

Pole position
Driver	Ryan Newman	Penske Racing South
- Time: 29.370

Most laps led
Driver	Kyle Busch	Hendrick Motorsports
- Laps: 107

Winner
No. 5	Kyle Busch	Hendrick Motorsports

Television in the United States
- Network: TNT
- Announcers: Bill Weber, Benny Parsons, & Wally Dallenbach Jr.

The 2006 Lenox Industrial Tools 300 was a NASCAR Nextel Cup Series race held on July 16, 2006, at New Hampshire International Speedway, in Loudon, New Hampshire. Contested over 308 laps – extended from 300 laps due to a green–white–checkered finish – on the 1.058-mile (1.703-kilometre) speedway, it was the 19th race of the 2006 NASCAR Nextel Cup Series season. Kyle Busch of Hendrick Motorsports won the race.

== Background ==
New Hampshire International Speedway is a 1.058-mile (1.703-kilometre) oval speedway located in Loudon, New Hampshire which has hosted NASCAR racing annually since the early 1990s, as well as an IndyCar weekend and the oldest motorcycle race in North America, the Loudon Classic. Nicknamed "The Magic Mile", the speedway is often converted into a 1.6-mile (2.6-kilometre) road course, which includes much of the oval. The track was originally the site of Bryar Motorsports Park before being purchased and redeveloped by Bob Bahre. The track is one of eight major NASCAR tracks owned and operated by Speedway Motorsports.

== Qualifying ==
ST	Car #	Driver	Make	Primary Sponsor	SPD Q	Time	BHND
1	12	Ryan Newman	Dodge	ALLTEL	129.683	29.370	0.000
2	31	Jeff Burton	Chevrolet	Cingular Wireless	129.652	29.377	00.007
3	25	Brian Vickers	Chevrolet	GMAC	129.626	29.383	00.013
4	5	Kyle Busch	Chevrolet	Kellogg's	129.485	29.415	00.045
5	20	Tony Stewart	Chevrolet	The Home Depot	129.024	29.520	00.150
6	48	Jimmie Johnson	Chevrolet	Lowe's	128.994	29.527	00.157
7	24	Jeff Gordon	Chevrolet	DuPont	128.976	29.531	00.161
8	1	Martin Truex Jr	Chevrolet	Bass Pro Shops	128.828	29.565	00.195
9	41	Reed Sorenson	Dodge	Target	128.767	29.579	00.209
10	2	Kurt Busch	Dodge	Miller Lite	128.693	29.596	00.226
11	9	Kasey Kahne	Dodge	Dodge Dealers/UAW	128.689	29.597	00.227
12	11	Denny Hamlin	Chevrolet	FedEx	128.650	29.606	00.236
13	6	Mark Martin	Ford	AAA	128.454	29.651	00.281
14	29	Kevin Harvick	Chevrolet	GM Goodwrench	128.433	29.656	00.286
15	96	Tony Raines	Chevrolet	DLP HDTV	128.402	29.663	00.293
16	01	Joe Nemechek	Chevrolet	U.S. Army	128.389	29.666	00.296
17	99	Carl Edwards	Ford	Office Depot	128.281	29.691	00.321
18	38	Elliott Sadler	Ford	M&M's	128.268	29.694	00.324
19	78	Kenny Wallace	Chevrolet	Furniture Row Racing	128.204	29.709	00.339
20	18	JJ Yeley	Chevrolet	Interstate Batteries	128.173	29.716	00.346
21	21	Ken Schrader	Ford	Little Debbie	128.092	29.735	00.365
22	40	David Stremme	Dodge	Coors Light	128.083	29.737	00.367
23	14	Sterling Marlin	Chevrolet	Waste Management	128.023	29.751	00.381
24	17	Matt Kenseth	Ford	DeWalt	127.967	29.764	00.394
25	8	Dale Earnhardt Jr	Chevrolet	Budweiser	127.821	29.798	00.428
26	16	Greg Biffle	Ford	Subway/National Guard	127.782	29.807	00.437
27	43	Bobby Labonte	Dodge	Cheerios	127.735	29.818	00.448
28	22	Dave Blaney	Dodge	Caterpillar	127.722	29.821	00.451
29	42	Casey Mears	Dodge	Texaco/Havoline	127.714	29.823	00.453
30	32	Travis Kvapil	Chevrolet	Tide	127.705	29.825	00.455
31	07	Clint Bowyer	Chevrolet	Sylvania	127.615	29.846	00.476
32	88	Dale Jarrett	Ford	UPS	127.551	29.861	00.491
33	26	Jamie McMurray	Ford	Lenox Industrial Tools	127.525	29.867	00.497
34	7	Robby Gordon	Chevrolet	Menards/Mapei	127.406	29.895	00.525
35	66	Jeff Green	Chevrolet	Best Buy	127.397	29.897	00.527
36	4	Scott Wimmer	Chevrolet	AERO Exhaust	127.189	29.946	00.576
37	19	Jeremy Mayfield	Dodge	Dodge Dealers / UAW / AskDrZ.com	127.036	29.982	00.612
38	49	Kevin Lepage	Dodge	State Water Heaters	126.977	29.996	00.626
39	55	Michael Waltrip	Dodge	NAPA Auto Parts	126.943	30.004	00.634
40	95	Stanton Barrett	Chevrolet	TheRaceSpace/Quality Metric	126.656	30.072	00.702
41	45	Kyle Petty	Dodge	Petty Enterprises	126.467	30.117	00.747
42	10	Scott Riggs	Dodge	Auto Value	126.332	30.149	00.779
43	00	Bill Elliott	Chevrolet	Burger King		30.239	
Failed to qualify or withdrew
44	61	Ted Christopher	Chevrolet	Peak Performance		30.167	
45	34	Joey McCarthy	Chevrolet	Oak Glove Co.		30.221	
46	74	Derrike Cope	Dodge	Howes Lubricator / Royal Admin.		30.240	
47	89	Morgan Shepherd	Dodge	Victory In Jesus		30.392	
WD	52	Larry Gunselman	Dodge	Quality Metric	0.000	0.000	0.000

== Results ==
POS	ST	#	DRIVER	SPONSOR / OWNER	CAR	LAPS	MONEY	STATUS	LED	PTS
1	4	5	Kyle Busch	Kellogg's (Rick Hendrick)	Chevrolet	308	242175	running	107	190
2	17	99	Carl Edwards	Office Depot (Jack Roush)	Ford	308	177900	running	0	170
3	26	16	Greg Biffle	Subway / National Guard (Jack Roush)	Ford	308	142950	running	25	170
4	13	6	Mark Martin	AAA (Jack Roush)	Ford	308	124700	running	0	160
5	14	29	Kevin Harvick	GM Goodwrench (Richard Childress)	Chevrolet	308	143461	running	0	155
6	12	11	Denny Hamlin	FedEx Express (Joe Gibbs)	Chevrolet	308	95425	running	1	155
7	2	31	Jeff Burton	Cingular Wireless (Richard Childress)	Chevrolet	308	127870	running	37	151
8	11	9	Kasey Kahne	Dodge Dealers / UAW / AskDrZ.com (Ray Evernham)	Dodge	308	119689	running	0	142
9	6	48	Jimmie Johnson	Lowe's (Rick Hendrick)	Chevrolet	308	127711	running	0	138
10	42	10	Scott Riggs	Auto Value / Bumper to Bumper (James Rocco)	Dodge	308	92425	running	0	134
11	22	40	David Stremme	Coors Light (Chip Ganassi)	Dodge	308	109233	running	0	130
12	20	18	J.J. Yeley	Interstate Batteries (Joe Gibbs)	Chevrolet	308	114950	running	0	127
13	28	22	Dave Blaney	Caterpillar (Bill Davis)	Dodge	308	95783	running	0	124
14	24	17	Matt Kenseth	DeWalt (Jack Roush)	Ford	308	119716	running	0	121
15	7	24	Jeff Gordon	DuPont (Rick Hendrick)	Chevrolet	308	121961	running	1	123
16	23	14	Sterling Marlin	Waste Management (Nelson Bowers)	Chevrolet	308	90333	running	0	115
17	3	25	Brian Vickers	GMAC (Rick Hendrick)	Chevrolet	308	90525	running	34	117
18	8	1	Martin Truex Jr.	Bass Pro Shops / Tracker (Dale Earnhardt, Inc.)	Chevrolet	308	95083	running	0	109
19	34	7	Robby Gordon	Menards / MAPEI (Robby Gordon)	Chevrolet	308	75125	running	0	106
20	36	4	Scott Wimmer	AERO Exhaust (Larry McClure)	Chevrolet	308	77625	running	0	103
21	29	42	Casey Mears	Texaco / Havoline (Chip Ganassi)	Dodge	308	108658	running	0	100
22	15	96	Tony Raines	DLP HDTV (Bill Saunders)	Chevrolet	308	74200	running	0	97
23	27	43	Bobby Labonte	Cheerios / Betty Crocker (Petty Enterprises)	Dodge	308	110836	running	0	94
24	9	41	Reed Sorenson	Target (Chip Ganassi)	Dodge	308	92550	running	31	96
25	18	38	Elliott Sadler	M&M's (Yates Racing)	Ford	307	101608	running	5	93
26	35	66	Jeff Green	Haas Automation / Best Buy (Gene Haas)	Chevrolet	307	90647	running	0	85
27	31	07	Clint Bowyer	Sylvania (Richard Childress)	Chevrolet	307	80375	running	23	87
28	41	45	Kyle Petty	Petty Enterprises (Petty Enterprises)	Dodge	306	77675	running	0	79
29	37	19	Jeremy Mayfield	Dodge Dealers / UAW / AskDrZ.com (Ray Evernham)	Dodge	306	99391	running	0	76
30	38	49	Kevin Lepage	State Water Heaters / LoansDepot.com (Beth Ann Morgenthau)	Dodge	306	69650	running	0	73
31	32	88	Dale Jarrett	UPS (Yates Racing)	Ford	306	101025	running	0	70
32	43	00	Bill Elliott	Burger King (Michael Waltrip)	Chevrolet	305	68725	running	0	67
33	33	26	Jamie McMurray	Lenox Industrial Tools (Jack Roush)	Ford	303	116300	running	0	64
34	21	21	Ken Schrader	Sunbelt Snacks (Wood Brothers)	Ford	303	95539	running	0	61
35	30	32	Travis Kvapil	Tide / Downy (Cal Wells)	Chevrolet	301	68125	crash	0	58
36	39	55	Michael Waltrip	NAPA Auto Parts (Doug Bawel)	Dodge	300	67900	crash	0	55
37	5	20	Tony Stewart	The Home Depot (Joe Gibbs)	Chevrolet	285	121636	running	28	57
38	10	2	Kurt Busch	Miller Lite (Roger Penske)	Dodge	285	108533	running	0	49
39	1	12	Ryan Newman	Alltel (Roger Penske)	Dodge	279	121483	running	16	51
40	40	95	Stanton Barrett	Quality Metric (Stanton Barrett)	Chevrolet	200	67225	oil pump	0	43
41	16	01	Joe Nemechek	U.S. Army (Nelson Bowers)	Chevrolet	199	93405	crash	0	40
42	19	78	Kenny Wallace	Furniture Row Racing (Barney Visser)	Chevrolet	184	66935	crash	0	37
43	25	8	Dale Earnhardt Jr.	Budweiser (Dale Earnhardt, Inc.)	Chevrolet	134	102130	engine	0	34
Failed to qualify, withdrew, or driver changes:
POS	NAME	NBR	SPONSOR	OWNER	CAR					
44	Ted Christopher	61	Peak Performance	Bob Jenkins	Chevrolet					
45	Joey McCarthy	34	Oak Glove Co.	Bob Jenkins	Chevrolet					
46	Derrike Cope	74	Howes Lubricator / Royal Admin.	Raynard McGlynn	Dodge					
47	Morgan Shepherd	89	Victory In Jesus	Morgan Shepherd	Dodge					
WD	Larry Gunselman	52	Quality Metric	Rick Ware	Dodge					

== Race statistics ==
- Time of race: 3:12:51
- Average speed: 101.384 miles per hour (163.162 km/h)
- Pole speed: 129.683 miles per hour (208.705 km/h)
- Cautions: 11 for 49 laps
- Margin of victory: 0.406 seconds
- Lead changes: 21
- Percent of race run under caution: 15.9%
- Average green flag run: 21.6 laps

Previous race: 2006 USG Sheetrock 400	Nextel Cup Series; 2006 season	Next race: 2006 Pennsylvania 500
