= Frank Stoddard =

NASCAR crew chief

Personal information
- Nationality: American
- Born: April 20, 1968
- Occupation(s): NASCAR team owner Crew chief
- Years active: 2011–present 1998–2013

Sport
- Sport: NASCAR Cup Series
- Team: Go Fas Racing

Francis Allen Stoddard (born April 20, 1968) is an American NASCAR crew chief and owner from Haverhill, New Hampshire. He is the founder of Go Fas Racing, a NASCAR Cup Series team. He began his career with Dana Patten in the Busch Series. Later, he worked with Jeff Burton and Roush Racing, and won seventeen races together. Late in the 2002 season, he switched to Bill Davis Racing and served as crew chief for Ward Burton. In 2005, he joined MB/Sutton Motorsports as the crew chief for a lifelong friend Boris Said in the No. 36 Chevrolet, making nine starts with one top-five finish.

In 2006, Said and Stoddard teamed with Mark Simo to field the No. 60 No Fear Ford. That team finished three top-tens and one pole position.

== Roush Racing ==
In 1998, Stoddard was hired by Jack Roush as a crew chief for Jeff Burton driving in #99 Ford replacing Buddy Parrott. Stoddard would guide Burton to 14 wins including the Coca-Cola 600 in 2001. In 2002, Stoddard left Roush Racing to go to Bill Davis racing with Ward Burton, Jeff's brother, as the driver and then rookie Scott Wimmer.

== 2005–present: Reunited with Boris Said ==
In 2005, Stoddard reunited with a lifelong friend of his, Boris Said, who was driving for NASCAR on part-time schedules mostly on road course races. They formed a race team with PepsiCo's Sobe Energy Drink called No Fear Racing in which Pepsi, Stoddard, and Boris Said would buy cars from Roush Fenway Racing and have a campaign called "Sell more cases so we can run more races." In 2006, they finished in 9th place at Sonoma after qualifying in fourth spot for their first race. The next week in one of Daytona's biggest upsets, Boris Said and Stoddard won the team the pole spot for the 2006 Pepsi 400. In the race, Boris drove through the top ten nearly all day and during a caution, took the lead by not pitting for tires. They led nine laps about to win one of NASCAR's biggest events ever. As the final restart occurred with 3 laps left, the fans roared believing that Boris would win the event. With 2 laps left, Tony Stewart stunned Boris and everybody when he got by Boris Said for the lead after briefly losing some ground, and seconds later Kyle and Kurt Busch drove by Boris Said who held on for 4th place; the team's best finish that point at Daytona. Boris Said and Stoddard emotionally said in post-race ceremonies that although they did not win, Said's performance and finish felt like a win to him.

In 2007 in the Daytona 500, Said and Stoddard posted a good finish for them when taking advantage of a final lap big one to finish in 15th place. Had the crash not occurred Said would have finished in 26th place. Boris Said and Frank Stoddard nearly won the pole spot for the 2007 Pepsi 400 again for a second consecutive time but they ended up being knocked out of the race by a rainshower when they were about to conclude qualifying and take the pole. This is one of Boris Said and Frank Stoddard's most heartbreaking parts of their career. After Boris Said ended up failing to qualify for a race at Watkins Glen because of rain, he gave up on their slogan and decided to continue his part-time career.

After 2007's season Said and Stoddard found themselves being separated due to issues on the teams. Stoddard would rarely work for Said until 2010 when they were reunited again, this time driving part-time for a different team.

=== 2010 ===
In 2010, Stoddard was reunited with Said at new upstart team Latitude 43 Motorsports. They raced together for the first four races, posting a top-25 run in the Daytona 500. At Sonoma, Stoddard was furious with Tony Stewart for contact on the final lap. Said took control of Stoddard and apologized for Stoddard's behavior. Stoddard was released from his team after 2010, and Said also left the team refusing to let Stoddard go by himself as close friends.

== Go Fas Racing ==
On February 3, 2011, Stoddard announced the formation of FAS Lane Racing. The team fields the No. 32 with Ford as the manufacturer, with cars from Roush Fenway Racing and Richard Petty Motorsports and a Doug Yates engine. U.S. Chrome sponsored the team at Daytona with Terry Labonte driving, a move that guaranteed the No. 32 an entry into the Daytona 500, since Labonte was the most recent former champion in a team not in the Top 35 owner's points. The team ran the full season with a variety of drivers including Ken Schrader, Said and Mike Skinner. The team finished 34th in owner's points, despite not qualifying at Bristol Motor Speedway.

After two more tumultuous seasons with operating the team, Stoddard decided to bring on more leadership. At the end of 2013, FAS Lane Racing merged with Go Green Racing for the 2014 season, forming Go FAS Racing. Stoddard ceased most of his involvement in the team, except for a consulting role that he held from 2016 to 2019. Go FAS last fielded the #32 for Corey LaJoie before the team shut down at the end of 2020. Stoddard has not been active in the racing community since.
