= 2005 GFS Marketplace 400 =

Race details
- Race 23 of 36 in the 2005 NASCAR Nextel Cup Series
- The 2005 GFS Marketplace 400 program cover, featuring Greg Biffle, winner of the 2004 race.
- Date: August 21, 2005
- Official name: 36th Annual GFS Marketplace 400
- Location: Brooklyn, Michigan, Michigan International Speedway
- Course: Permanent racing facility
- Course length: 2 miles (3.2 km)
- Distance: 200 laps, 400 mi (643.737 km)
- Scheduled distance: 200 laps, 400 mi (643.737 km)
- Average speed: 141.551 miles per hour (227.804 km/h)
- Attendance: 140,000

Pole position
Driver	Joe Nemechek	MB2 Motorsports
- Time: 37.592

Most laps led
Driver	Kurt Busch	Roush Racing
- Laps: 65

Winner
No. 19	Jeremy Mayfield	Evernham Motorsports

Television in the United States
- Network: TNT
- Announcers: Bill Weber, Benny Parsons, Wally Dallenbach Jr.

Radio in the United States
- Radio: Motor Racing Network

The 2005 GFS Marketplace 400 was the 23rd stock car race of the 2005 NASCAR Nextel Cup Series season and the 36th iteration of the event. The race was held on Sunday, August 21, 2005, in Brooklyn, Michigan at Michigan International Speedway, a two-mile (3.2 km) permanent moderate-banked D-shaped speedway. The race took the scheduled 200 laps to complete. After a caution on lap 144, drivers would use many different fuel strategies to get to the end, including pitting and trying to stretch a fuel run, a gas and go, or two or four tires. Jeremy Mayfield of Evernham Motorsports would top off on fuel on Lap 149, and would take the lead on lap 195 after many leaders had to pit due to running out of fuel. Mayfield would conserve and coast to the line to win his fifth and final NASCAR Nextel Cup Series career win and his only win of the season. To fill out the podium, Scott Riggs of MBV Motorsports and Matt Kenseth of Roush Racing would finish second and third, respectively.

== Background ==
The layout of Michigan International Speedway, the venue where the race was held.

The race was held at Michigan International Speedway, a two-mile (3.2 km) moderate-banked D-shaped speedway located in Brooklyn, Michigan. The track is used primarily for NASCAR events. It is known as a "sister track" to Texas World Speedway as MIS's oval design was a direct basis of TWS, with moderate modifications to the banking in the corners, and was used as the basis of Auto Club Speedway. The track is owned by International Speedway Corporation. Michigan International Speedway is recognized as one of motorsports' premier facilities because of its wide racing surface and high banking (by open-wheel standards; the 18-degree banking is modest by stock car standards).

=== Entry list ===
#	Driver	Team	Make
0	Mike Bliss	Haas CNC Racing	Chevrolet
00	Johnny Benson Jr.	Michael Waltrip Racing	Chevrolet
01	Joe Nemechek	MB2 Motorsports	Chevrolet
2	Rusty Wallace	Penske Racing	Dodge
4	John Andretti	Morgan–McClure Motorsports	Chevrolet
5	Kyle Busch	Hendrick Motorsports	Chevrolet
6	Mark Martin	Roush Racing	Ford
7	Robby Gordon	Robby Gordon Motorsports	Chevrolet
07	Dave Blaney	Richard Childress Racing	Chevrolet
8	Dale Earnhardt Jr.	Dale Earnhardt, Inc.	Chevrolet
9	Kasey Kahne	Evernham Motorsports	Dodge
10	Scott Riggs	MBV Motorsports	Chevrolet
11	Terry Labonte	Joe Gibbs Racing	Chevrolet
12	Ryan Newman	Penske Racing	Dodge
13	Greg Sacks*	Sacks Motorsports	Dodge
15	Michael Waltrip	Dale Earnhardt, Inc.	Chevrolet
16	Greg Biffle	Roush Racing	Ford
17	Matt Kenseth	Roush Racing	Ford
18	Bobby Labonte	Joe Gibbs Racing	Chevrolet
19	Jeremy Mayfield	Evernham Motorsports	Dodge
20	Tony Stewart	Joe Gibbs Racing	Chevrolet
21	Ricky Rudd	Wood Brothers Racing	Ford
22	Scott Wimmer	Bill Davis Racing	Dodge
24	Jeff Gordon	Hendrick Motorsports	Chevrolet
25	Brian Vickers	Hendrick Motorsports	Chevrolet
29	Kevin Harvick	Richard Childress Racing	Chevrolet
31	Jeff Burton	Richard Childress Racing	Chevrolet
32	Bobby Hamilton Jr.	PPI Motorsports	Chevrolet
34	P. J. Jones	Mach 1 Motorsports	Chevrolet
37	Tony Raines	R&J Racing	Dodge
38	Elliott Sadler	Robert Yates Racing	Ford
40	Sterling Marlin	Chip Ganassi Racing with Felix Sabates	Dodge
41	Casey Mears	Chip Ganassi Racing with Felix Sabates	Dodge
42	Jamie McMurray	Chip Ganassi Racing with Felix Sabates	Dodge
43	Jeff Green	Petty Enterprises	Dodge
45	Kyle Petty	Petty Enterprises	Dodge
48	Jimmie Johnson	Hendrick Motorsports	Chevrolet
49	Ken Schrader	BAM Racing	Dodge
51	Stuart Kirby	Competitive Edge Motorsports	Chevrolet
66	Jimmy Spencer	Peak Fitness Racing	Ford
77	Travis Kvapil	Penske Racing	Dodge
79	Bryan Reffner	Conely Racing	Chevrolet
80	Carl Long	McGlynn Racing	Dodge
88	Dale Jarrett	Robert Yates Racing	Ford
89	Morgan Shepherd	Shepherd Racing Ventures	Dodge
91	Bill Elliott	Evernham Motorsports	Dodge
92	Eric McClure	Front Row Motorsports	Chevrolet
97	Kurt Busch	Roush Racing	Ford
99	Carl Edwards	Roush Racing	Ford
Official entry list

*Withdrew on Friday.

== Practice ==
=== First practice ===
The first practice session was held on Friday, August 19, at 1:20 PM EST and would last for one hour and 20 minutes. Joe Nemechek of MB2 Motorsports would set the fastest time in the session, with a lap of 38.504 and an average speed of 186.994 miles per hour (300.938 km/h).

Pos.	#	Driver	Team	Make	Time	Speed
1	01	Joe Nemechek	MB2 Motorsports	Chevrolet	38.504	186.994
2	6	Mark Martin	Roush Racing	Ford	38.515	186.940
3	22	Scott Wimmer	Bill Davis Racing	Dodge	38.812	185.510
Full first practice results

=== Second and final practice ===
The second and final practice session, sometimes referred to as Happy Hour, was held on Friday, August 19, at 4:00 PM EST and would last for one hour. Dale Jarrett of Robert Yates Racing would set the fastest time in the session, with a lap of 38.460 and an average speed of 187.208 miles per hour (301.282 km/h).

Pos.	#	Driver	Team	Make	Time	Speed
1	88	Dale Jarrett	Robert Yates Racing	Ford	38.460	187.208
2	12	Ryan Newman	Penske Racing	Dodge	38.503	186.998
3	01	Joe Nemechek	MB2 Motorsports	Chevrolet	38.615	186.456
Full Happy Hour practice results

== Qualifying ==
Qualifying was held on Saturday, August 20, at 12:10 PM EST. Each driver would have two laps to set their fastest lap; whichever lap was fastest would be considered their official lap time. Joe Nemechek of MB2 Motorsports would win the pole, with a lap of 37.592 and an average speed of 191.530 miles per hour (308.238 km/h).

Five drivers would fail to qualify: P. J. Jones, Carl Long, Eric McClure, Bryan Reffner, and Morgan Shepherd.

=== Full qualifying results ===
Pos.	#	Driver	Team	Make	Time	Speed
1	01	Joe Nemechek	MB2 Motorsports	Chevrolet	37.592	191.530
2	24	Jeff Gordon	Hendrick Motorsports	Chevrolet	37.627	191.352
3	9	Kasey Kahne	Evernham Motorsports	Dodge	37.645	191.260
4	5	Kyle Busch	Hendrick Motorsports	Chevrolet	37.687	191.047
5	12	Ryan Newman	Penske Racing	Dodge	37.692	191.022
6	0	Mike Bliss	Haas CNC Racing	Chevrolet	37.709	190.936
7	25	Brian Vickers	Hendrick Motorsports	Chevrolet	37.744	190.759
8	38	Elliott Sadler	Robert Yates Racing	Ford	37.837	190.290
9	21	Ricky Rudd	Wood Brothers Racing	Ford	37.844	190.255
10	48	Jimmie Johnson	Hendrick Motorsports	Chevrolet	37.895	189.999
11	19	Jeremy Mayfield	Evernham Motorsports	Dodge	37.906	189.943
12	99	Carl Edwards	Roush Racing	Ford	37.934	189.803
13	17	Matt Kenseth	Roush Racing	Ford	37.951	189.718
14	6	Mark Martin	Roush Racing	Ford	37.995	189.499
15	37	Tony Raines	R&J Racing	Dodge	38.033	189.309
16	8	Dale Earnhardt Jr.	Dale Earnhardt, Inc.	Chevrolet	38.045	189.250
17	97	Kurt Busch	Roush Racing	Ford	38.070	189.125
18	18	Bobby Labonte	Joe Gibbs Racing	Chevrolet	38.090	189.026
19	10	Scott Riggs	MBV Motorsports	Chevrolet	38.106	188.947
20	11	Terry Labonte	Joe Gibbs Racing	Chevrolet	38.132	188.818
21	51	Stuart Kirby	Competitive Edge Motorsports	Chevrolet	38.142	188.768
22	22	Scott Wimmer	Bill Davis Racing	Dodge	38.181	188.576
23	4	John Andretti	Morgan–McClure Motorsports	Chevrolet	38.186	188.551
24	15	Michael Waltrip	Dale Earnhardt, Inc.	Chevrolet	38.196	188.501
25	07	Dave Blaney	Richard Childress Racing	Chevrolet	38.209	188.437
26	43	Jeff Green	Petty Enterprises	Dodge	38.236	188.304
27	49	Ken Schrader	BAM Racing	Dodge	38.263	188.171
28	42	Jamie McMurray	Chip Ganassi Racing with Felix Sabates	Dodge	38.270	188.137
29	91	Bill Elliott	Evernham Motorsports	Dodge	38.272	188.127
30	41	Casey Mears	Chip Ganassi Racing with Felix Sabates	Dodge	38.284	188.068
31	16	Greg Biffle	Roush Racing	Ford	38.292	188.029
32	66	Jimmy Spencer	Peak Fitness Racing	Ford	38.311	187.936
33	88	Dale Jarrett	Robert Yates Racing	Ford	38.338	187.803
34	00	Johnny Benson Jr.	Michael Waltrip Racing	Chevrolet	38.340	187.793
35	45	Kyle Petty	Petty Enterprises	Dodge	38.365	187.671
36	20	Tony Stewart	Joe Gibbs Racing	Chevrolet	38.383	187.583
37	40	Sterling Marlin	Chip Ganassi Racing with Felix Sabates	Dodge	38.400	187.500
38	2	Rusty Wallace	Penske Racing	Dodge	38.445	187.281
39	7	Robby Gordon	Robby Gordon Motorsports	Chevrolet	38.503	186.998
40	31	Jeff Burton	Richard Childress Racing	Chevrolet	38.531	186.863
Qualified by owner's points
41	77	Travis Kvapil	Penske Racing	Dodge	38.740	185.854
42	29	Kevin Harvick	Richard Childress Racing	Chevrolet	38.808	185.529
Last car to qualify on time
43	32	Bobby Hamilton Jr.	PPI Motorsports	Chevrolet	38.521	186.911
Failed to qualify or withdrew
44	34	P. J. Jones	Mach 1 Motorsports	Chevrolet	38.706	186.018
45	80	Carl Long	McGlynn Racing	Dodge	38.825	185.447
46	92	Eric McClure	Front Row Motorsports	Chevrolet	38.937	184.914
47	79	Bryan Reffner	Conely Racing	Chevrolet	39.317	183.127
48	89	Morgan Shepherd	Shepherd Racing Ventures	Dodge	40.152	179.319
WD	13	Greg Sacks	Sacks Motorsports	Dodge	—	—
Official qualifying results

== Race results ==
Fin	St	#	Driver	Team	Make	Laps	Led	Status	Pts	Winnings
1	11	19	Jeremy Mayfield	Evernham Motorsports	Dodge	200	6	running	185	$181,550
2	19	10	Scott Riggs	MBV Motorsports	Chevrolet	200	13	running	175	$153,763
3	13	17	Matt Kenseth	Roush Racing	Ford	200	9	running	170	$148,371
4	12	99	Carl Edwards	Roush Racing	Ford	200	17	running	165	$109,595
5	36	20	Tony Stewart	Joe Gibbs Racing	Chevrolet	200	0	running	155	$135,491
6	31	16	Greg Biffle	Roush Racing	Ford	200	3	running	155	$96,015
7	17	97	Kurt Busch	Roush Racing	Ford	200	65	running	156	$134,490
8	1	01	Joe Nemechek	MB2 Motorsports	Chevrolet	200	30	running	147	$120,898
9	7	25	Brian Vickers	Hendrick Motorsports	Chevrolet	200	0	running	138	$87,590
10	10	48	Jimmie Johnson	Hendrick Motorsports	Chevrolet	200	0	running	134	$125,481
11	29	91	Bill Elliott	Evernham Motorsports	Dodge	200	0	running	130	$75,155
12	5	12	Ryan Newman	Penske Racing	Dodge	200	0	running	127	$133,106
13	38	2	Rusty Wallace	Penske Racing	Dodge	200	0	running	124	$107,948
14	30	41	Casey Mears	Chip Ganassi Racing with Felix Sabates	Dodge	200	0	running	121	$100,623
15	2	24	Jeff Gordon	Hendrick Motorsports	Chevrolet	200	0	running	118	$122,201
16	18	18	Bobby Labonte	Joe Gibbs Racing	Chevrolet	200	0	running	115	$110,265
17	14	6	Mark Martin	Roush Racing	Ford	200	10	running	117	$88,840
18	16	8	Dale Earnhardt Jr.	Dale Earnhardt, Inc.	Chevrolet	200	1	running	114	$117,948
19	9	21	Ricky Rudd	Wood Brothers Racing	Ford	200	0	running	106	$101,454
20	28	42	Jamie McMurray	Chip Ganassi Racing with Felix Sabates	Dodge	200	0	running	103	$83,790
21	37	40	Sterling Marlin	Chip Ganassi Racing with Felix Sabates	Dodge	200	1	running	105	$101,298
22	42	29	Kevin Harvick	Richard Childress Racing	Chevrolet	200	0	running	97	$116,426
23	22	22	Scott Wimmer	Bill Davis Racing	Dodge	200	0	running	94	$93,473
24	26	43	Jeff Green	Petty Enterprises	Dodge	200	0	running	91	$101,501
25	27	49	Ken Schrader	BAM Racing	Dodge	200	0	running	63	$72,190
26	40	31	Jeff Burton	Richard Childress Racing	Chevrolet	200	0	running	85	$98,535
27	24	15	Michael Waltrip	Dale Earnhardt, Inc.	Chevrolet	199	0	running	82	$98,699
28	23	4	John Andretti	Morgan–McClure Motorsports	Chevrolet	199	0	running	79	$71,225
29	3	9	Kasey Kahne	Evernham Motorsports	Dodge	199	15	running	81	$103,190
30	39	7	Robby Gordon	Robby Gordon Motorsports	Chevrolet	199	0	running	73	$71,365
31	15	37	Tony Raines	R&J Racing	Dodge	198	2	running	75	$70,240
32	25	07	Dave Blaney	Richard Childress Racing	Chevrolet	198	0	running	67	$75,665
33	35	45	Kyle Petty	Petty Enterprises	Dodge	198	0	running	64	$77,137
34	33	88	Dale Jarrett	Robert Yates Racing	Ford	198	0	running	61	$102,593
35	43	32	Bobby Hamilton Jr.	PPI Motorsports	Chevrolet	197	0	running	58	$67,340
36	32	66	Jimmy Spencer	Peak Fitness Racing	Ford	196	0	running	55	$67,290
37	6	0	Mike Bliss	Haas CNC Racing	Chevrolet	185	0	running	52	$67,240
38	41	77	Travis Kvapil	Penske Racing	Dodge	179	0	crash	49	$76,640
39	8	38	Elliott Sadler	Robert Yates Racing	Ford	174	0	running	46	$107,086
40	20	11	Terry Labonte	Joe Gibbs Racing	Chevrolet	159	0	engine	43	$67,035
41	21	51	Stuart Kirby	Competitive Edge Motorsports	Chevrolet	140	0	crash	40	$67,000
42	34	00	Johnny Benson Jr.	Michael Waltrip Racing	Chevrolet	127	0	oil leak	37	$66,960
43	4	5	Kyle Busch	Hendrick Motorsports	Chevrolet	81	28	overheating	39	$74,506
Official race results

Previous race: 2005 Sirius Satellite Radio at The Glen	NASCAR Nextel Cup Series; 2005 season	Next race: 2005 Sharpie 500
