= 2004 Tropicana 400 =

2004 Tropicana 400 presented by Meijer
Race details
- Race 18 of 36 in the 2004 NASCAR Nextel Cup Series
- The 2004 Tropicana 400 program cover.
- Date: July 11, 2004
- Official name: Fourth Annual Tropicana 400 presented by Meijer
- Location: Joliet, Illinois, Chicagoland Speedway
- Course: Permanent racing facility
- Course length: 1.5 miles (2.41 km)
- Distance: 267 laps, 400.5 mi (644.542 km)
- Scheduled distance: 267 laps, 400.5 mi (644.542 km)
- Average speed: 129.507 miles per hour (208.421 km/h)
- Attendance: 80,000

Pole position
Driver	Jeff Gordon	Hendrick Motorsports
- Time: 28.886

Most laps led
Driver	Tony Stewart	Joe Gibbs Racing
- Laps: 160

Winner
No. 20	Tony Stewart	Joe Gibbs Racing

Television in the United States
- Network: NBC
- Announcers: Allen Bestwick, Benny Parsons, Wally Dallenbach Jr.

Radio in the United States
- Radio: Motor Racing Network

The 2004 Tropicana 400 presented by Meijer was the 18th stock car race of the 2004 NASCAR Nextel Cup Series season and the 4th iteration of the event. The race was held on Sunday, July 11, 2004, before a crowd of 80,000 in Joliet, Illinois, at Chicagoland Speedway, a 1.5 miles (2.41 km) tri-oval speedway. The race took the scheduled 267 laps to complete. At race's end, Tony Stewart of Joe Gibbs Racing would win a controversial race, after an altercation with Evernham Motorsports driver Kasey Kahne left owner Ray Evernham accusing Stewart of numerous occasions of reckless driving and stating that "He needs to get suspended, and he should have his ass beat." The win was Stewart's 18th career NASCAR Nextel Cup Series win and his first of the season. To fill out the podium, Jimmie Johnson of Hendrick Motorsports finished 2nd and Dale Jarrett of Robert Yates Racing finished 3rd.

== Background ==
The layout of Chicagoland Speedway, the venue where the race was held.

Chicagoland Speedway is a 1.5 miles (2.41 km) tri-oval speedway in Joliet, Illinois, southwest of Chicago. The speedway opened in 2001 and currently hosts NASCAR racing. Until 2011, the speedway also hosted the IndyCar Series, recording numerous close finishes including the closest finish in IndyCar history. The speedway is owned and operated by International Speedway Corporation and located adjacent to Route 66 Raceway.

=== Entry list ===
#	Driver	Team	Make
0	Ward Burton	Haas CNC Racing	Chevrolet
1	John Andretti	Dale Earnhardt, Inc.	Chevrolet
01	Joe Nemechek	MBV Motorsports	Chevrolet
2	Rusty Wallace	Penske-Jasper Racing	Dodge
02	Hermie Sadler	SCORE Motorsports	Chevrolet
4	Jimmy Spencer	Morgan–McClure Motorsports	Chevrolet
5	Terry Labonte	Hendrick Motorsports	Chevrolet
6	Mark Martin	Roush Racing	Ford
8	Dale Earnhardt Jr.	Dale Earnhardt, Inc.	Chevrolet
9	Kasey Kahne	Evernham Motorsports	Dodge
09	Bobby Hamilton Jr.	Phoenix Racing	Dodge
10	Scott Riggs	MBV Motorsports	Chevrolet
12	Ryan Newman	Penske-Jasper Racing	Dodge
13	Greg Sacks	Sacks Motorsports	Dodge
15	Michael Waltrip	Dale Earnhardt, Inc.	Chevrolet
16	Greg Biffle	Roush Racing	Ford
17	Matt Kenseth	Roush Racing	Ford
18	Bobby Labonte	Joe Gibbs Racing	Chevrolet
19	Jeremy Mayfield	Evernham Motorsports	Dodge
20	Tony Stewart	Joe Gibbs Racing	Chevrolet
21	Ricky Rudd	Wood Brothers Racing	Ford
22	Scott Wimmer	Bill Davis Racing	Dodge
24	Jeff Gordon	Hendrick Motorsports	Chevrolet
25	Brian Vickers	Hendrick Motorsports	Chevrolet
29	Kevin Harvick	Richard Childress Racing	Chevrolet
30	Johnny Sauter	Richard Childress Racing	Chevrolet
31	Robby Gordon	Richard Childress Racing	Chevrolet
32	Ricky Craven	PPI Motorsports	Chevrolet
37	Chad Blount	R&J Racing	Dodge
38	Elliott Sadler	Robert Yates Racing	Ford
40	Sterling Marlin	Chip Ganassi Racing	Dodge
41	Casey Mears	Chip Ganassi Racing	Dodge
42	Jamie McMurray	Chip Ganassi Racing	Dodge
43	Jeff Green	Petty Enterprises	Dodge
45	Kyle Petty	Petty Enterprises	Dodge
48	Jimmie Johnson	Hendrick Motorsports	Chevrolet
49	Ken Schrader	BAM Racing	Dodge
50	P. J. Jones	Arnold Motorsports	Dodge
51	Kevin Lepage	Competitive Edge Motorsports	Chevrolet
72	Kirk Shelmerdine	Kirk Shelmerdine Racing	Ford
77	Brendan Gaughan	Penske-Jasper Racing	Dodge
80	Mike Bliss	Joe Gibbs Racing	Chevrolet
88	Dale Jarrett	Robert Yates Racing	Ford
89	Morgan Shepherd*	Shepherd Racing Ventures	Dodge
97	Kurt Busch	Roush Racing	Ford
98	Todd Bodine	Mach 1 Motorsports	Ford
99	Jeff Burton	Roush Racing	Ford
Official entry list

== Practice ==
=== First practice ===
The first practice session would occur on Friday, July 9, at 11:20 AM CST, and would last for two hours. Jimmie Johnson of Hendrick Motorsports would set the fastest time in the session, with a lap of 29.106 and an average speed of 185.529 miles per hour (298.580 km/h).

Pos.	#	Driver	Team	Make	Time	Speed
1	48	Jimmie Johnson	Hendrick Motorsports	Chevrolet	29.106	185.529
2	9	Kasey Kahne	Evernham Motorsports	Dodge	29.117	185.459
3	6	Mark Martin	Roush Racing	Ford	29.268	184.502
Full first practice results

=== Second practice ===
The second practice session would occur on Saturday, July 10, at 8:30 AM CST, and would last for 45 minutes. Mark Martin of Roush Racing would set the fastest time in the session, with a lap of 29.662 and an average speed of 182.051 miles per hour (292.983 km/h).

Pos.	#	Driver	Team	Make	Time	Speed
1	6	Mark Martin	Roush Racing	Ford	29.662	182.051
2	48	Jimmie Johnson	Hendrick Motorsports	Chevrolet	29.775	181.360
3	41	Casey Mears	Chip Ganassi Racing	Dodge	29.787	181.287
Full second practice results

=== Third and final practice ===
The third and final practice session, sometimes referred to as Happy Hour, would occur on Saturday, July 10, at 11:10 AM CST, and would last for 45 minutes. Brian Vickers of Hendrick Motorsports would set the fastest time in the session, with a lap of 29.563 and an average speed of 182.661 miles per hour (293.964 km/h).

Pos.	#	Driver	Team	Make	Time	Speed
1	25	Brian Vickers	Hendrick Motorsports	Chevrolet	29.563	182.661
2	48	Jimmie Johnson	Hendrick Motorsports	Chevrolet	29.832	181.014
3	6	Mark Martin	Roush Racing	Ford	29.932	180.409
Full Happy Hour practice results

== Qualifying ==
Qualifying would take occur on Friday, July 9, at 3:10 PM CST. Each driver would have two laps to set a fastest time; the fastest of the two would count as their official qualifying lap. Positions 1-38 would be decided on time, while positions 39-43 would be based on provisionals. Four spots are awarded by the use of provisionals based on owner's points. The fifth is awarded to a past champion who has not otherwise qualified for the race. If no past champ needs the provisional, the next team in the owner points will be awarded a provisional.

Jeff Gordon of Hendrick Motorsports would win the pole, setting a time of 28.886 and an average speed of 186.942 miles per hour (300.854 km/h).

=== Full qualifying results ===
Pos.	#	Driver	Team	Make	Time	Speed
1	24	Jeff Gordon	Hendrick Motorsports	Chevrolet	28.886	186.942
2	9	Kasey Kahne	Evernham Motorsports	Dodge	28.897	186.871
3	48	Jimmie Johnson	Hendrick Motorsports	Chevrolet	28.987	186.290
4	25	Brian Vickers	Hendrick Motorsports	Chevrolet	29.070	185.758
5	16	Greg Biffle	Roush Racing	Ford	29.074	185.733
6	99	Jeff Burton	Roush Racing	Ford	29.109	185.510
7	80	Mike Bliss	Joe Gibbs Racing	Chevrolet	29.124	185.414
8	12	Ryan Newman	Penske-Jasper Racing	Dodge	29.146	185.274
9	01	Joe Nemechek	MBV Motorsports	Chevrolet	29.152	185.236
10	20	Tony Stewart	Joe Gibbs Racing	Chevrolet	29.157	185.204
11	18	Bobby Labonte	Joe Gibbs Racing	Chevrolet	29.157	185.204
12	41	Casey Mears	Chip Ganassi Racing	Dodge	29.179	185.065
13	38	Elliott Sadler	Robert Yates Racing	Ford	29.196	184.957
14	42	Jamie McMurray	Chip Ganassi Racing	Dodge	29.198	184.944
15	77	Brendan Gaughan	Penske-Jasper Racing	Dodge	29.200	184.932
16	10	Scott Riggs	MBV Motorsports	Chevrolet	29.206	184.893
17	29	Kevin Harvick	Richard Childress Racing	Chevrolet	29.232	184.729
18	6	Mark Martin	Roush Racing	Ford	29.240	184.678
19	19	Jeremy Mayfield	Evernham Motorsports	Dodge	29.247	184.634
20	2	Rusty Wallace	Penske-Jasper Racing	Dodge	29.301	184.294
21	97	Kurt Busch	Roush Racing	Ford	29.305	184.269
22	0	Ward Burton	Haas CNC Racing	Chevrolet	29.309	184.244
23	31	Robby Gordon	Richard Childress Racing	Chevrolet	29.321	184.168
24	5	Terry Labonte	Hendrick Motorsports	Chevrolet	29.344	184.024
25	8	Dale Earnhardt Jr.	Dale Earnhardt, Inc.	Chevrolet	29.382	183.786
26	17	Matt Kenseth	Roush Racing	Ford	29.410	183.611
27	51	Kevin Lepage	Competitive Edge Motorsports	Chevrolet	29.413	183.592
28	09	Bobby Hamilton Jr.	Phoenix Racing	Dodge	29.434	183.461
29	88	Dale Jarrett	Robert Yates Racing	Ford	29.436	183.436
30	21	Ricky Rudd	Wood Brothers Racing	Ford	29.440	183.424
31	1	John Andretti	Dale Earnhardt, Inc.	Chevrolet	29.496	183.076
32	40	Sterling Marlin	Chip Ganassi Racing	Dodge	29.532	182.852
33	02	Hermie Sadler	SCORE Motorsports	Chevrolet	29.561	182.673
34	4	Jimmy Spencer	Morgan–McClure Motorsports	Chevrolet	29.562	182.667
35	32	Ricky Craven	PPI Motorsports	Chevrolet	29.567	182.636
36	30	Dave Blaney	Richard Childress Racing	Chevrolet	29.597	182.451
37	37	Chad Blount	R&J Racing	Dodge	29.655	182.094
38	43	Jeff Green	Petty Enterprises	Dodge	29.702	181.806
Provisionals
39	15	Michael Waltrip	Dale Earnhardt, Inc.	Chevrolet	29.831	181.020
40	22	Scott Wimmer	Bill Davis Racing	Dodge	29.821	181.080
41	49	Ken Schrader	BAM Racing	Dodge	29.734	181.610
42	45	Kyle Petty	Petty Enterprises	Dodge	29.911	180.536
43	50	P. J. Jones	Arnold Motorsports	Dodge	29.731	181.629
Failed to qualify or withdrew
44	98	Todd Bodine	Mach 1 Motorsports	Ford	29.794	181.245
45	13	Greg Sacks	Sacks Motorsports	Dodge	30.176	178.950
46	72	Kirk Shelmerdine	Kirk Shelmerdine Racing	Ford	30.803	175.308
WD	89	Morgan Shepherd	Shepherd Racing Ventures	Dodge	—	—
Official qualifying results

== Race ==
Pole sitter Jeff Gordon led the first lap of the race. On lap 15, rookie Kasey Kahne took the lead from Gordon. On lap 18, the first caution flew when Ryan Newman and Kurt Busch crashed in turn 2. Tony Stewart was the leader of the race on the restart. On that restart, rookie Brendan Gaughan's car began smoking. The caution flew to check for oil. Gaughan had actually broken a trackbar and the race was back underway on lap 30. On lap 39, the third caution came out for debris laying all over the backstretch with drivers like Matt Kenseth and Kevin Harvick running over the debris. After the longest green flag run of 78 laps, the fourth caution came out when Ricky Craven's engine blew. Kasey Kahne won the race off of pit road and was the race leader. But on the restart, chaos would ensue. On the restart, Tony Stewart jumped to the outside of Sterling Marlin. Stewart then got on Kahne's back bumper when Kahne's car got loose and crashed into the outside wall causing an 8 car wreck in turn 1. The cars involved were Kahne, Stewart, John Andretti, Dale Earnhardt Jr., Scott Riggs, Jeff Gordon, Dave Blaney, and Jeff Burton. On pit road, Kahne's crew chief Tommy Baldwin Jr. and his crew went over to talk to Tony Stewart's crew chief Greg Zipadelli when a big fight occurred on pit road between Baldwin and Zipadelli with the crews getting in the middle of it. The race got back going again on lap 135 with Stewart as the leader. On lap 172, the 6th caution came out for debris. On lap 181, Jimmie Johnson took the lead from Stewart. On lap 209, the 7th caution would fly when Mike Bliss crashed off of turn 2. Jeremy Mayfield would be the race leader on the restart. On lap 241, Stewart would pass Mayfield for the race lead. With 23 to go, the 8th caution flew for debris in turn 4. With 15 to go, The 9th and final caution flew when Robby Gordon spun Jeff Green in turn 3. On the restart with 11 to go, Stewart took the lead and took the win for his first win of 2004. Jimmie Johnson, Dale Jarrett, Jeff Gordon, and Jeremy Mayfield rounded out the top 5 while Terry Labonte, Sterling Marlin, Joe Nemechek, Michael Waltrip, and Kevin Harvick rounded out the top 10. After the race, all of the pit crew, crew chiefs (Baldwin Jr. and Zipadelli) and owners (Ray Evernham and Joe Gibbs) of cars #9 and #20 were fined $50,000 and placed on probation for their actions. Stewart was not penalized.

== Race results ==
Fin	St	#	Driver	Team	Make	Laps	Led	Status	Pts	Winnings
1	10	20	Tony Stewart	Joe Gibbs Racing	Chevrolet	267	160	running	190	$336,803
2	3	48	Jimmie Johnson	Hendrick Motorsports	Chevrolet	267	31	running	175	$208,640
3	29	88	Dale Jarrett	Robert Yates Racing	Ford	267	0	running	165	$188,592
4	1	24	Jeff Gordon	Hendrick Motorsports	Chevrolet	267	14	running	165	$172,453
5	19	19	Jeremy Mayfield	Evernham Motorsports	Dodge	267	26	running	160	$130,575
6	24	5	Terry Labonte	Hendrick Motorsports	Chevrolet	267	1	running	155	$123,075
7	32	40	Sterling Marlin	Chip Ganassi Racing	Dodge	267	9	running	151	$126,200
8	9	01	Joe Nemechek	MBV Motorsports	Chevrolet	267	0	running	142	$112,850
9	39	15	Michael Waltrip	Dale Earnhardt, Inc.	Chevrolet	267	0	running	138	$124,556
10	17	29	Kevin Harvick	Richard Childress Racing	Chevrolet	267	0	running	134	$122,053
11	20	2	Rusty Wallace	Penske-Jasper Racing	Dodge	267	0	running	130	$121,908
12	26	17	Matt Kenseth	Roush Racing	Ford	267	1	running	132	$127,853
13	14	42	Jamie McMurray	Chip Ganassi Racing	Dodge	267	0	running	124	$88,100
14	4	25	Brian Vickers	Hendrick Motorsports	Chevrolet	267	0	running	121	$87,950
15	12	41	Casey Mears	Chip Ganassi Racing	Dodge	267	0	running	118	$92,150
16	31	1	John Andretti	Dale Earnhardt, Inc.	Chevrolet	267	0	running	115	$73,250
17	23	31	Robby Gordon	Richard Childress Racing	Chevrolet	267	2	running	117	$107,837
18	11	18	Bobby Labonte	Joe Gibbs Racing	Chevrolet	267	1	running	114	$117,133
19	22	0	Ward Burton	Haas CNC Racing	Chevrolet	267	0	running	106	$75,150
20	5	16	Greg Biffle	Roush Racing	Ford	267	0	running	103	$84,400
21	13	38	Elliott Sadler	Robert Yates Racing	Ford	267	0	running	100	$109,083
22	25	8	Dale Earnhardt Jr.	Dale Earnhardt, Inc.	Chevrolet	267	0	running	97	$116,828
23	40	22	Scott Wimmer	Bill Davis Racing	Dodge	267	0	running	94	$91,975
24	18	6	Mark Martin	Roush Racing	Ford	265	10	running	96	$79,850
25	34	4	Jimmy Spencer	Morgan–McClure Motorsports	Chevrolet	265	0	running	88	$71,550
26	42	45	Kyle Petty	Petty Enterprises	Dodge	265	0	running	85	$78,839
27	41	49	Ken Schrader	BAM Racing	Dodge	263	0	running	82	$69,750
28	38	43	Jeff Green	Petty Enterprises	Dodge	248	0	crash	79	$95,300
29	16	10	Scott Riggs	MBV Motorsports	Chevrolet	245	0	running	76	$94,037
30	15	77	Brendan Gaughan	Penske-Jasper Racing	Dodge	240	0	running	73	$76,100
31	7	80	Mike Bliss	Joe Gibbs Racing	Chevrolet	205	0	crash	70	$65,900
32	30	21	Ricky Rudd	Wood Brothers Racing	Ford	204	0	running	67	$91,256
33	6	99	Jeff Burton	Roush Racing	Ford	197	0	running	64	$99,342
34	8	12	Ryan Newman	Penske-Jasper Racing	Dodge	166	0	crash	61	$111,667
35	21	97	Kurt Busch	Roush Racing	Ford	151	0	running	58	$84,600
36	2	9	Kasey Kahne	Evernham Motorsports	Dodge	136	10	crash	60	$94,275
37	36	30	Dave Blaney	Richard Childress Racing	Chevrolet	129	1	crash	57	$72,175
38	35	32	Ricky Craven	PPI Motorsports	Chevrolet	116	0	engine	49	$71,975
39	43	50	P. J. Jones	Arnold Motorsports	Dodge	108	0	too slow	46	$63,765
40	33	02	Hermie Sadler	SCORE Motorsports	Chevrolet	103	0	transmission	43	$63,555
41	28	09	Bobby Hamilton Jr.	Phoenix Racing	Dodge	86	0	engine	40	$63,335
42	27	51	Kevin Lepage	Competitive Edge Motorsports	Chevrolet	34	1	fuel pump	42	$63,170
43	37	37	Chad Blount	R&J Racing	Dodge	3	0	electrical	34	$63,207
Failed to qualify or withdrew
44		98	Todd Bodine	Mach 1 Motorsports	Ford					
45		13	Greg Sacks	Sacks Motorsports	Dodge					
46		72	Kirk Shelmerdine	Kirk Shelmerdine Racing	Ford					
WD		89	Morgan Shepherd	Shepherd Racing Ventures	Dodge					
Official race results

Previous race: 2004 Pepsi 400	NASCAR Nextel Cup Series; 2004 season	Next race: 2004 Siemens 300
