= 2005 Ford 400 =

Race details
- Race 36 of 36 in the 2005 NASCAR Nextel Cup Series season
- The 2005 Ford 400 program cover, featuring all 10 Chase drivers. "It All Ends Here!"
- Date: November 20, 2005
- Location: Homestead Miami Speedway, Homestead, Florida
- Course: Permanent racing facility
- Course length: 1.5 miles (2.4 km)
- Distance: 267 laps, 400.5 mi (644.542 km)
- Weather: Temperatures averaging around 75.6 °F (24.2 °C); wind speeds up to 12.7 miles per hour (20.4 km/h)
- Average speed: 131.431 miles per hour (211.518 km/h)

Pole position
Driver	Carl Edwards	Roush Racing

Most laps led
Driver	Carl Edwards	Roush Racing
- Laps: 94

Winner
No. 16	Greg Biffle	Roush Racing

Television in the United States
- Network: NBC
- Announcers: Bill Weber, Benny Parsons, & Wally Dallenbach Jr.

The 2005 Ford 400 was a NASCAR Nextel Cup Series race held on November 20, 2005, at Homestead Miami Speedway in Homestead, Florida. Contested over 267 laps on the 1.5 miles (2.4 km) speedway, it was the 36th and final race of the 2005 NASCAR Nextel Cup Series season. Greg Biffle of Roush Racing won the race and Tony Stewart of Joe Gibbs Racing won the championship.

== Background ==
Homestead-Miami Speedway is a motor racing track located in Homestead, Florida. The track, which has several configurations, has promoted several series of racing, including NASCAR, the Verizon IndyCar Series, the Grand-Am Rolex Sports Car Series, and the Championship Cup Series.

From 2002 to 2019, Homestead–Miami Speedway hosted the final race of the season in all three of NASCAR's series: the Sprint Cup Series, Xfinity Series, and the Camping World Truck Series. Ford Motor Company sponsors all three of the season-ending races; the races have the names Ford 400, Ford 300, and Ford 200, respectively, and the weekend is marketed as Ford Championship Weekend.

=== Entry list ===
#	Driver	Team	Make
0	Mike Bliss	Haas CNC Racing	Chevrolet
00	Derrike Cope	McGlynn Racing	Dodge
01	Joe Nemechek	MBV Motorsports	Chevrolet
2	Rusty Wallace	Penske-Jasper Racing	Dodge
4	Todd Bodine	Morgan–McClure Motorsports	Chevrolet
5	Kyle Busch	Hendrick Motorsports	Chevrolet
6	Mark Martin	Roush Racing	Ford
7	Robby Gordon	Robby Gordon Motorsports	Ford
07	Dave Blaney	Richard Childress Racing	Chevrolet
8	Dale Earnhardt Jr.	Dale Earnhardt, Inc.	Chevrolet
9	Kasey Kahne	Evernham Motorsports	Dodge
09	Reed Sorenson	Phoenix Racing	Dodge
10	Scott Riggs	MBV Motorsports	Chevrolet
11	Denny Hamlin	Joe Gibbs Racing	Chevrolet
12	Ryan Newman	Penske-Jasper Racing	Dodge
15	Michael Waltrip	Dale Earnhardt, Inc.	Chevrolet
16	Greg Biffle	Roush Racing	Ford
17	Matt Kenseth	Roush Racing	Ford
18	Bobby Labonte	Joe Gibbs Racing	Chevrolet
19	Jeremy Mayfield	Evernham Motorsports	Dodge
20	Tony Stewart	Joe Gibbs Racing	Chevrolet
21	Ricky Rudd	Wood Brothers Racing	Ford
22	Scott Wimmer	Bill Davis Racing	Dodge
24	Jeff Gordon	Hendrick Motorsports	Chevrolet
25	Brian Vickers	Hendrick Motorsports	Chevrolet
29	Kevin Harvick	Richard Childress Racing	Chevrolet
31	Jeff Burton	Richard Childress Racing	Chevrolet
32	Bobby Hamilton Jr.	PPI Motorsports	Chevrolet
37	Mike Skinner	R&J Racing	Dodge
38	Elliott Sadler	Robert Yates Racing	Ford
39	David Stremme	Chip Ganassi Racing	Dodge
40	Sterling Marlin	Chip Ganassi Racing	Dodge
41	Casey Mears	Chip Ganassi Racing	Dodge
42	Jamie McMurray	Chip Ganassi Racing	Dodge
43	Jeff Green	Petty Enterprises	Dodge
45	Kyle Petty	Petty Enterprises	Dodge
48	Jimmie Johnson	Hendrick Motorsports	Chevrolet
49	Ken Schrader	BAM Racing	Dodge
50	Jimmy Spencer	Arnold Motorsports	Dodge
51	Mike Garvey	Competitive Edge Motorsports	Chevrolet
66	Kevin Lepage	Peak Fitness Racing	Ford
77	Travis Kvapil	Penske-Jasper Racing	Dodge
80	Carl Long	Hover Motorsports	Chevrolet
88	Dale Jarrett	Robert Yates Racing	Ford
89	Morgan Shepherd	Shepherd Racing Ventures	Ford
92	Chad Chaffin	Front Row Motorsports	Chevrolet
97	Kenny Wallace	Roush Racing	Ford
99	Carl Edwards	Roush Racing	Ford

== Qualifying ==
Carl Edwards would win the pole with a 30.673, beating out Ryan Newman by 2 thousandths of a second.

There were numerous qualifying crashes throughout the day. The first would occur when during Carl Long's qualifying run, Long's car would get loose heading into Turn 1, causing his car to go into a tailspin. The car went up the track and eventually, the rear of the car hit the middle of the Turn 1-2 wall, severely damaging his car. Long would not get a qualifying time, and since the 80 car, owned by Hover Motorsports was not top 35 in owner's points, did not get a provisional and thus Long would not qualify. Morgan Shepherd would also suffer a spin on his warmup lap. Shepherd would pull into pit road, with his team scrambling to get back out on track. His car was not able to get out within the 5 minute clock Shepherd was forced to qualify in, classifying Shepherd as a Did Not Start (DNS). Shepherd would not qualify. The third accident of the day was when Michael Waltrip suffered a similar crash to Carl Long earlier in the day, totaling Waltrip's car. The rear of the car was extremely damaged, forcing Waltrip to take a provisional and to be in a backup car. The last accident of the day happened when Hamlin also entered into a tailspin and hit the Turn 1 wall, ironically with the crash being the same as both Long's and Waltrip's crashes. Although Hamlin had only competed in very select races that year, the No. 11 team was Top 35 in the points that year. Hamlin would take a provisional and start 42nd. Eerily, Hamlin's crash was about the same as the one as he had suffered in the Busch Series race he was qualifying for.

Pos.	#	Driver	Make	Team	Time	Avg. Speed (mph)
1	99	Carl Edwards	Ford	Roush Racing	30.673	176.051
2	12	Ryan Newman	Dodge	Penske-Jasper Racing	30.675	176.039
3	9	Kasey Kahne	Dodge	Evernham Motorsports	30.700	175.896
4	5	Kyle Busch	Chevrolet	Hendrick Motorsports	30.759	175.558
5	6	Mark Martin	Ford	Roush Racing	30.809	175.273
6	41	Casey Mears	Dodge	Chip Ganassi Racing	30.818	175.222
7	16	Greg Biffle	Ford	Roush Racing	30.859	174.990
8	42	Jamie McMurray	Dodge	Chip Ganassi Racing	30.863	174.967
9	88	Dale Jarrett	Ford	Robert Yates Racing	30.917	174.661
10	01	Joe Nemechek	Chevrolet	MBV Motorsports	30.927	174.605
11	07	Dave Blaney	Chevrolet	Richard Childress Racing	30.930	174.588
12	24	Jeff Gordon	Chevrolet	Hendrick Motorsports	30.936	174.554
13	19	Jeremy Mayfield	Dodge	Evernham Motorsports	30.939	174.537
14	29	Kevin Harvick	Chevrolet	Richard Childress Racing	30.945	174.503
15	09	Reed Sorenson	Dodge	Phoenix Racing	30.958	174.430
16	31	Jeff Burton	Chevrolet	Richard Childress Racing	30.972	174.351
17	17	Matt Kenseth	Ford	Roush Racing	30.988	174.261
18	25	Brian Vickers	Chevrolet	Hendrick Motorsports	31.012	174.126
19	0	Mike Bliss	Chevrolet	Haas CNC Racing	31.036	173.992
20	20	Tony Stewart	Chevrolet	Joe Gibbs Racing	31.061	173.852
21	18	Bobby Labonte	Chevrolet	Joe Gibbs Racing	31.065	173.829
22	39	David Stremme	Dodge	Chip Ganassi Racing	31.093	173.673
23	38	Elliott Sadler	Ford	Robert Yates Racing	31.118	173.533
24	4	Todd Bodine	Chevrolet	Morgan–McClure Motorsports	31.125	173.494
25	21	Ricky Rudd	Ford	Wood Brothers Racing	31.134	173.444
26	40	Sterling Marlin	Dodge	Chip Ganassi Racing	31.163	173.282
27	22	Scott Wimmer	Dodge	Bill Davis Racing	31.167	173.260
28	66	Kevin Lepage	Ford	Peak Fitness Racing	31.175	173.216
29	43	Jeff Green	Dodge	Petty Enterprises	31.208	173.033
30	77	Travis Kvapil	Dodge	Penske-Jasper Racing	31.217	172.983
31	10	Scott Riggs	Chevrolet	MBV Motorsports	31.242	172.844
32	48	Jimmie Johnson	Chevrolet	Hendrick Motorsports	31.264	172.723
33	50	Jimmy Spencer	Dodge	Arnold Motorsports	31.284	172.612
34	49	Ken Schrader	Dodge	BAM Racing	31.286	172.601
35	45	Kyle Petty	Dodge	Petty Enterprises	31.312	172.458
36	97	Kenny Wallace	Ford	Roush Racing	31.316	172.436
37	2	Rusty Wallace	Dodge	Penske-Jasper Racing	31.348	172.260
38	32	Bobby Hamilton, Jr.	Chevrolet	PPI Motorsports	31.383	172.068
39	7	Robby Gordon	Chevrolet	Robby Gordon Motorsports	31.396	171.996
Provisionals
40	8	Dale Earnhardt, Jr.	Chevrolet	Dale Earnhardt, Inc.	31.625	170.751
41	15	Michael Waltrip	Chevrolet	Dale Earnhardt, Inc.	0.000	0.000
42	11	Denny Hamlin	Chevrolet	Joe Gibbs Racing	0.000	0.000
43	37	Mike Skinner	Dodge	R&J Racing	31.431	171.805
Failed to qualify
44	92	Chad Chaffin	Chevrolet	Front Row Motorsports	31.536	171.233
45	51	Mike Garvey	Chevrolet	Competitive Edge Motorsports	31.602	170.875
46	00	Derrike Cope	Dodge	McGlynn Racing	31.628	170.735
47	89	Morgan Shepherd	Dodge	Shepherd Racing Ventures	0.000	0.000
48	80	Carl Long	Dodge	Hover Motorsports	0.000	0.000

== Race ==
Greg Biffle won the race and leading Roush Racing 1–2–3–4 finish, a feat not repeated until the 2021 Drydene 400 at Dover when Hendrick Motorsports repeated the same feat. (Note: Joe Gibbs Racing had repeated the same feat at 2019 Federated Auto Parts 400, but Erik Jones, finishing fourth that race, was later disqualified.) Meanwhile, Carl Edwards, Greg Biffle, Tony Stewart, and Jimmie Johnson each had a mathematical chance to win the championship. However, Johnson crashed out at Lap 127 with a blown tire in Turn Three. Despite the fact that Edwards and Biffle finished upfront while Stewart finished 15th, Stewart still won the championship. The race was also the last for Rusty Wallace as he retired afterward, having competed in NASCAR Cup racing for 25 years.

== Race results ==
Fin	St	#	Driver	Make	Team	Sponsor	Laps	Gap	Led	Status	Pts	Winnings
1	7	16	Greg Biffle	Ford	Roush Racing	Post-it Notes, National Guard	267	+0.000	9	running	185	$308,675
2	5	6	Mark Martin	Ford	Roush Racing	Viagra	267	+0.017	2	running	175	$235,875
3	17	17	Matt Kenseth	Ford	Roush Racing	DeWalt	267		0	running	165	$219,711
4	1	99	Carl Edwards	Ford	Roush Racing	Office Depot	267		94	running	170	$167,400
5	6	41	Casey Mears	Dodge	Chip Ganassi Racing	Target	267		75	running	160	$148,808
6	11	07	Dave Blaney	Chevrolet	Richard Childress Racing	Jack Daniel's	267		6	running	155	$120,250
7	2	12	Ryan Newman	Dodge	Penske-Jasper Racing	Alltel	267		33	running	151	$138,691
8	14	29	Kevin Harvick	Chevrolet	Richard Childress Racing	GM Goodwrench	267		1	running	147	$123,836
9	12	24	Jeff Gordon	Chevrolet	Hendrick Motorsports	DuPont	267		39	running	143	$118,611
10	13	19	Jeremy Mayfield	Dodge	Evernham Motorsports	Dodge Dealers, UAW	267		0	running	134	$101,070
11	27	22	Scott Wimmer	Dodge	Bill Davis Racing	Caterpillar	267		0	running	130	$94,333
12	19	0	Mike Bliss	Chevrolet	Haas CNC Racing	NetZero, Best Buy	267		0	running	127	$70,075
13	37	2	Rusty Wallace	Dodge	Penske-Jasper Racing	Miller Lite	267		0	running	124	$99,408
14	39	7	Robby Gordon	Chevrolet	Robby Gordon Motorsports	Jim Beam	267		0	running	121	$74,025
15	20	20	Tony Stewart	Chevrolet	Joe Gibbs Racing	Home Depot	267		0	running	118	$113,586
16	3	9	Kasey Kahne	Dodge	Evernham Motorsports	Dodge Dealers, UAW	267		0	running	115	$99,625
17	9	88	Dale Jarrett	Ford	Robert Yates Racing	UPS	266	+1 lap	0	running	112	$101,308
18	8	42	Jamie McMurray	Dodge	Chip Ganassi Racing	Texaco, Havoline	266	+1 lap	0	running	109	$74,850
19	40	8	Dale Earnhardt, Jr.	Chevrolet	Dale Earnhardt, Inc.	Budweiser	266	+1 lap	0	running	106	$110,358
20	24	4	Todd Bodine	Chevrolet	Morgan–McClure Motorsports	Lucas Oil, Coyote Ugly Saloon	266	+1 lap	0	running	103	$68,375
21	36	97	Kenny Wallace	Ford	Roush Racing	Irwin Industrial Tools	266	+1 lap	0	running	100	$109,950
22	34	49	Ken Schrader	Dodge	BAM Racing	Red Baron Frozen Pizza	266	+1 lap	0	running	97	$65,825
23	23	38	Elliott Sadler	Ford	Robert Yates Racing	M&M's	266	+1 lap	0	running	94	$103,066
24	10	01	Joe Nemechek	Chevrolet	MBV Motorsports	U.S. Army	266	+1 lap	2	running	96	$87,483
25	16	31	Jeff Burton	Chevrolet	Richard Childress Racing	Cingular Wireless	266	+1 lap	0	running	88	$91,770
26	26	40	Sterling Marlin	Dodge	Chip Ganassi Racing	Coors Light	265	+2 laps	3	running	90	$92,608
27	35	45	Kyle Petty	Dodge	Petty Enterprises	Checkers, University of Florida	265	+2 laps	0	running	82	$76,058
28	15	09	Reed Sorenson	Dodge	Phoenix Racing	Miccosukee Gaming & Resorts	265	+2 laps	0	running	79	$61,100
29	41	15	Michael Waltrip	Chevrolet	Dale Earnhardt, Inc.	NAPA Auto Parts	265	+2 laps	0	running	76	$91,114
30	29	43	Jeff Green	Dodge	Petty Enterprises	Chex Party Mix	264	+3 laps	0	running	73	$93,111
31	33	50	Jimmy Spencer	Dodge	Arnold Motorsports	Allied Steel Buildings	263	+4 laps	2	running	75	$60,475
32	30	77	Travis Kvapil	Dodge	Penske-Jasper Racing	Kodak, Jasper Engines & Transmissions	263	+4 laps	0	running	67	$72,275
33	42	11	Denny Hamlin	Chevrolet	Joe Gibbs Racing	FedEx Express	263	+4 laps	1	running	69	$61,030
34	21	18	Bobby Labonte	Chevrolet	Joe Gibbs Racing	Interstate Batteries	263	+4 laps	0	running	61	$94,450
35	28	66	Kevin Lepage	Ford	Peak Fitness Racing	Cabela's	263	+4 laps	0	running	58	$59,675
36	38	32	Bobby Hamilton, Jr.	Chevrolet	PPI Motorsports	Tide	263	+4 laps	0	running	55	$68,997
37	25	21	Ricky Rudd	Ford	Wood Brothers Racing	Motorcraft	262	+5 laps	0	running	52	$86,464
38	31	10	Scott Riggs	Chevrolet	MBV Motorsports	Checkers, Florida State University	259	+8 laps	0	running	49	$67,050
39	43	37	Mike Skinner	Dodge	R&J Racing	Patron Tequila, BoSPOKER.net	156	+111 laps	0	engine	46	$58,850
40	32	48	Jimmie Johnson	Chevrolet	Hendrick Motorsports	Lowe's	124	+143 laps	0	crash	43	$107,066
41	4	5	Kyle Busch	Chevrolet	Hendrick Motorsports	Kellogg's	115	+152 laps	0	crash	40	$66,425
42	22	39	David Stremme	Dodge	Chip Ganassi Racing	Commit Nicotene Lozenges	87	+180 laps	0	crash	37	$58,125
43	18	25	Brian Vickers	Chevrolet	Hendrick Motorsports	GMAC, ditech.com	82	+185 laps	0	crash	34	$66,279

== Race statistics ==
- Time of race: 3:02:50
- Average Speed: 131.431 miles per hour (211.518 km/h)
- Pole Speed: 176.051 miles per hour (283.327 km/h)
- Cautions: 8 for 37 laps
- Margin of Victory: 0.017
- Lead changes: 21
- Percent of race run under caution: 13.9%
- Average green flag run: 25.6 laps
