= Competitive Edge Motorsports =

Former American stock car team

- Owner: Joe Auer
- Base: Unknown
- Series: NEXTEL Cup
- Race drivers: Tony Raines
- Manufacturer: Chevrolet
- Opened: 2004
- Closed: 2006

Career
- Drivers' Championships: 0
- Race victories: 0

Competitive Edge Motorsports is a former NASCAR Nextel Cup Series team. It fielded the No. 51 Marathon Oil Chevrolet. Its principal owner was former NFL player Joe Auer.

CEM debuted at the 2004 Coca-Cola 600 with Kevin Lepage driving, finishing 43rd after suffering overheating failures. After running four more races with Lepage, all resulting in DNF's, Tony Raines took over the driving duties, his best finish being 28th at Dover. In 2005, ARCA racer Stuart Kirby began driving, qualifying for seven races, posting a best finish of 31st. Mike Garvey drove for the team in 2006, but after Joe Auer became concerned with the lack of performance and under funding, the team decided to allow Petty Enterprises finish off their sponsorship obligation.

== Car No. 51 results ==
NASCAR Nextel Cup Series results
Year	Driver	No.	Make	1	2	3	4	5	6	7	8	9	10	11	12	13	14	15	16	17	18	19	20	21	22	23	24	25	26	27	28	29	30	31	32	33	34	35	36	Owners	Pts
2004	Kevin Lepage	51	Chevy	DAY	CAR	LVS	ATL	DAR	BRI	TEX	MAR	TAL	CAL	RCH	CLT; 43	DOV; 41	POC; 43	MCH; 41	SON	DAY	CHI; 42	NHA; DNQ	POC; DNQ	IND; DNQ	GLN	MCH; DNQ														48th	560
2004	Tony Raines	51	Chevy																								BRI; 39	CAL	RCH; DNQ	NHA	DOV; 28	TAL	KAN	CLT; 43	MAR	ATL; 40	PHO; DNQ	DAR	HOM; DNQ	48th	560
2005	Stuart Kirby	51	Chevy	DAY	CAL	LVS	ATL	BRI	MAR	TEX	PHO	TAL	DAR	RCH	CLT	DOV	POC	MCH; 42	SON	DAY	CHI; 31	NHA	POC	IND; DNQ	GLN	MCH; 41	BRI	CAL; 43	RCH	NHA; 32	DOV	TAL	KAN; 37	CLT; 37	MAR	ATL; DNQ	TEX; DNQ			51st	474
2005	Bryan Reffner	51	Chevy																																			PHO; DNQ		51st	474
2005	Mike Garvey	51	Chevy																																				HOM; DNQ	51st	474
2006	Mike Garvey	51	Chevy	DAY	CAL; 38	LVS	ATL; DNQ	BRI; DNQ	MAR; 41	TEX; 38	PHO; DNQ	TAL	RCH	DAR	CLT; DNQ	DOV	POC; 41	MCH; DNQ	SON	DAY	CHI; DNQ	NHA	POC	IND	GLN	MCH	BRI	CAL	RCH	NHA	DOV	KAN	TAL	CLT	MAR	ATL	TEX	PHO	HOM	57th	285
