= LifeLock 400 =

LifeLock 400 may refer to several NASCAR events:

- Overton's 400 as the LifeLock.com 400 (July, 2008-2010), at Chicagoland Speedway in Joliet, Illinois
- FireKeepers Casino 400 as the LifeLock 400 (June, 2008-2009), at Michigan International Speedway in Brooklyn, Michigan
- NASCAR Cup Series at Kansas Speedway as LifeLock 400 (September 2007), at Kansas Speedway in Kansas City, Kansas
