= Stuart Kirby =

American racing driver

- Born: May 9, 1981 (age 45); Bowling Green, Kentucky, U.S.

NASCAR Cup Series career
- 10 races run over 3 years
- Best finish: 54th (2005)
- First race: 2001 UAW-GM Quality 500 (Charlotte)
- Last race: 2005 UAW-GM Quality 500 (Charlotte)
Wins	Top tens	Poles
0	0	0

NASCAR O'Reilly Auto Parts Series career
- 9 races run over 3 years
- Best finish: 53rd (2002)
- First race: 2002 O'Reilly 300 (Texas)
- Last race: 2005 Pepsi 300 (Nashville)
Wins	Top tens	Poles
0	0	0

NASCAR FedEx Freight Truck Series career
- 2 races run over 1 year
- Best finish: 82nd (2003)
- First race: 2003 New Hampshire 200 (Loudon
- Last race: 2003 John Boy & Billy 250 (SoBo)
Wins	Top tens	Poles
0	0	0

Stuart Kirby (born May 9, 1981) is an American former stock car racing driver. He has driven in ARCA, the Busch Series, and the NEXTEL Cup Series. A former apprentice funeral director for his family's funeral home, he drove the No. 51 Chevrolet owned by Competitive Edge Motorsports in 2005, but was released before the season could be concluded. He previously owned a Bruster's Ice Cream franchise in Bowling Green, KY while still pursuing a career in racing, but now works as a realtor for Sotheby's International Realty in Inlet Beach, Florida.

== Racing career ==
On October 7, 2001, Kirby made his Winston Cup Series debut at the UAW-GM Quality 500. Kirby was taken out early in a crash involving Todd Bodine and Ricky Craven. He raced for Jimmy Spencer in Busch and Trucks, and had a lot of success in ARCA Racing, where he got his first career pole driving a car with the American Boy Scouts logo.

In late 2005, Kirby was featured alongside his wife in MTV's "The Reality Show" during a segment titled, "'Til Death Do Us Part". As of then, Kirby was assisting his family as a funeral director in their funeral home. The show never even mentioned Kirby's racing career.

On August 28, 2009, Kirby made a comeback in his racing career after almost four years. He raced in the ARCA RE/MAX Series race at Chicagoland Speedway, qualifying twelfth and finished in eleventh place.

== Motorsports career results ==
=== NASCAR ===
(key) (Bold – Pole position awarded by qualifying time. Italics – Pole position earned by points standings or practice time. * – Most laps led.)

==== Nextel Cup Series ====
NASCAR Nextel Cup Series results
Year	Team	No.	Make	1	2	3	4	5	6	7	8	9	10	11	12	13	14	15	16	17	18	19	20	21	22	23	24	25	26	27	28	29	30	31	32	33	34	35	36	NNCC	Pts	Ref
2001	Bob Schacht Motorsports	75	Ford	DAY	CAR	LVS	ATL	DAR	BRI	TEX	MAR	TAL	CAL	RCH	CLT	DOV	MCH	POC	SON	DAY	CHI	NHA	POC	IND	GLN	MCH	BRI	DAR	RCH	DOV	KAN	CLT; 42	MAR	TAL	PHO	CAR	HOM	ATL	NHA	69th	37	
2002	CLR Racing	57	Ford	DAY	CAR	LVS	ATL	DAR	BRI	TEX	MAR	TAL	CAL	RCH	CLT	DOV	POC	MCH	SON	DAY	CHI; 43	NHA	POC	IND; DNQ	GLN	MCH	BRI	DAR	RCH	NHA	DOV									71st	86	
2002	BAM Racing	49	Dodge																													KAN; 37	TAL	CLT	MAR	ATL	CAR	PHO	HOM	71st	86	
2005	Competitive Edge Motorsports	51	Chevy	DAY	CAL	LVS	ATL	BRI	MAR	TEX	PHO	TAL	DAR	RCH	CLT	DOV	POC	MCH; 42	SON	DAY	CHI; 31	NHA	POC	IND; DNQ	GLN	MCH; 41	BRI	CAL; 43	RCH	NHA; 32	DOV	TAL	KAN; 37	CLT; 37	MAR	ATL; DNQ	TEX; DNQ	PHO	HOM	54th	352	

==== Busch Series ====
NASCAR Busch Series results
Year	Team	No.	Make	1	2	3	4	5	6	7	8	9	10	11	12	13	14	15	16	17	18	19	20	21	22	23	24	25	26	27	28	29	30	31	32	33	34	35	NBSC	Pts	Ref
2002	Frank Cicci Racing	34	Chevy	DAY	CAR	LVS	DAR	BRI	TEX; 43	NSH	TAL	CAL; 33	RCH	NHA	NZH	CLT; 41	DOV	NSH; 25	KEN; 29	MLW; 17	DAY	CHI	GTY; 36	PPR; 26	IRP	MCH	BRI	DAR	RCH	DOV	KAN	CLT	MEM	ATL	CAR	PHO	HOM		53rd	554	
2004	Bob Schacht Motorsports	65	Chevy	DAY	CAR	LVS	DAR	BRI	TEX	NSH	TAL	CAL	GTY	RCH	NZH	CLT	DOV	NSH	KEN; DNQ	MLW	DAY	CHI	NHA; DNQ	PPR	IRP	MCH	BRI	CAL	RCH	DOV	KAN	CLT	MEM	ATL	PHO	DAR	HOM		NA	-	
2005	Griffin Racing	73	Chevy	DAY	CAL	MXC	LVS	ATL	NSH; 42	BRI	TEX	PHO	TAL	DAR	RCH	CLT	DOV	NSH	KEN	MLW	DAY	CHI	NHA	PPR	GTY	IRP	GLN	MCH	BRI	CAL	RCH	DOV	KAN	CLT	MEM	TEX	PHO	HOM	142nd	37	

==== Craftsman Truck Series ====
NASCAR Craftsman Truck Series results
Year	Team	No.	Make	1	2	3	4	5	6	7	8	9	10	11	12	13	14	15	16	17	18	19	20	21	22	23	24	25	NCTC	Pts	Ref
2003	Ultra Motorsports	7	Dodge	DAY	DAR	MMR	MAR	CLT	DOV	TEX	MEM	MLW	KAN	KEN	GTW	MCH	IRP	NSH	BRI	RCH	NHA; 24	CAL	LVS						82nd	194	
2003	Troxell-MacDonald Racing	7	Chevy																					SBO; 20	TEX	MAR	PHO	HOM	82nd	194	

=== ARCA Re/Max Series ===
(key) (Bold – Pole position awarded by qualifying time. Italics – Pole position earned by points standings or practice time. * – Most laps led.)

ARCA Re/Max Series results
Year	Team	No.	Make	1	2	3	4	5	6	7	8	9	10	11	12	13	14	15	16	17	18	19	20	21	22	23	24	25	ARSC	Pts	Ref
2001	Bob Schacht Motorsports	75	Chevy	DAY; 5	NSH; 24	WIN	SLM	GTY	KEN	CLT; 2	KAN	MCH; 3	**POC**; 3	MEM	GLN	KEN	MCH	**POC**; 27	NSH	ISF	CHI	DSF	SLM	TOL	BLN	CLT	TAL; 13	ATL; 4	26th	1495	
2002	Bob Schacht Motorsports	75	Chevy	DAY	ATL	NSH	SLM	KEN	CLT	KAN; 2	POC	MCH	TOL	SBO	KEN	BLN	POC	NSH	ISF	WIN	DSF	CHI	SLM	TAL	CLT				105th	245	
2003	Bob Schacht Motorsports	75	Chevy	DAY	ATL; 26	NSH	SLM	TOL	KEN	CLT	BLN	KAN	MCH	LER	POC	POC	NSH	ISF	WIN	DSF	CHI	SLM	TAL	CLT	SBO				161st	100	
2004	Bob Schacht Motorsports	75	Chevy	DAY	NSH	SLM	KEN	TOL	CLT	KAN	POC	MCH	SBO	BLN	KEN	GTW	POC	LER	NSH; 36	ISF	TOL	DSF	**CHI**; 38	SLM	TAL; 7				75th	340	
2005	Bob Schacht Motorsports	75	Chevy	DAY	NSH	SLM	KEN; 6	TOL; 30	LAN	MIL	POC	MCH	KAN	KEN	BLN	POC	GTW	LER	NSH	MCH	ISF	TOL	DSF	CHI	SLM	TAL			89th	290	
2009	Hendren Motorsports	68	Chevy	DAY	SLM	CAR	TAL	KEN	TOL	POC	MCH	MFD	IOW	KEN	BLN	POC	ISF	CHI; 11	TOL	DSF	NJE	SLM	KAN	CAR					118th	175	
