= Bobby Hamilton Jr. =

American racing driver (born 1978)

- Born: Charles Robert Hamilton Jr. January 8, 1978 (age 48); Nashville, Tennessee, U.S.

NASCAR Cup Series career
- 64 races run over 5 years
- Best finish: 36th (2005)
- First race: 2000 Pennzoil 400 (Homestead)
- Last race: 2005 Ford 400 (Homestead)
Wins	Top tens	Poles
0	0	0

NASCAR O'Reilly Auto Parts Series career
- 253 races run over 10 years
- Best finish: 4th (2003)
- First race: 1998 AC Delco 200 (Rockingham)
- Last race: 2009 Dover 200 (Dover)
- First win: 2002 Busch 200 (Loudon)
- Last win: 2003 Bashas' Supermarkets 200 (Phoenix)
Wins	Top tens	Poles
5	63	4

NASCAR FedEx Freight Truck Series career
- 37 races run over 6 years
- Best finish: 16th (2006)
- First race: 2001 GNC Live Well 200 (Milwaukee)
- Last race: 2011 Bully Hill Vineyards 200 (Nashville)
Wins	Top tens	Poles
0	11	2
- Statistics up to date as of November 28, 2012.

Charles Robert Hamilton Jr. (born January 8, 1978) is an American former professional stock car racing driver. He formerly competed in the NASCAR Nextel Cup Series, Nationwide Series, and Camping World Truck Series.

== Early career ==
When he was fifteen years old, Hamilton found a Ford Pinto in his driveway as a gift from his father (2004 NASCAR Craftsman Truck Series Champion Bobby Hamilton). They fixed up the car, and Hamilton began racing it on weekends at the local speedway. In 1998, he moved to the ARCA series where he earned four top 5 finishes in five races.

== Motorsports career ==
=== 1998–2001 ===
In 1998, Hamilton began to run some Busch Series races for the Sadler Brothers Racing No. 95 team. He made his debut at Rockingham in October, where he started in 27th position. He led four laps and finished 37th, three laps off the lead. He also made the race at Atlanta, had a nineteenth place start and twentieth-place finish. Hamilton and the No. 95 Shoney's Inn team entered 1999 with a part-time schedule. In four races with the team, his best start was sixth at Daytona, and his best finishes were 27th at Rockingham and Darlington. Hamilton did not race again until the Hensley Motorsports No. 63 Exxon Superflo team had an opening. He ran six of the next seven races, beginning at Watkins Glen. In that seat, he set his best career finish of 21st at Pikes Peak. Hamilton then moved over to the No. 22 Air Jamaica Team owned by Carroll Racing. He qualified for all the races he attempted, and matched his career best start of sixth at Charlotte. At Homestead-Miami Hamilton started fifteenth and finished ninth.

Hamilton got a full-time ride with Carroll in 2000, driving the newly formed No. 26 Chevy, with sponsorship from Baywatch. Hamilton had three top 10s in 2000, with a fourth at Talladega, and a pair of sevenths at Charlotte and Memphis. Hamilton also won his first career pole in the season finale at Homestead-Miami. He finished 19th in points. During the Homestead weekend in 2000, he made his Winston Cup Series debut at that track, driving the No. 57 Chevrolet owned by his father. He finished 33rd in that race, six laps down. He drove the No. 01 Coors Light Chevrolet for SABCO Racing the following week to a 31st-place finish.

Hamilton returned to Carroll had a pair of fifth at Darlington and Rockingham in 2001. He also added three other top-tens and won another pole at Fontana in addition to starting in the top-ten for half the races. After finishing seventeenth in points, he left the team. He made his Truck Series debut that year at The Milwaukee Mile in the No. 4 Dana Dodge Ram for BHR but exited early due to a transmission failure. He also ran three races in the No. 33 Oakwood Homes Chevy for Andy Petree Racing as a teammate to his father, filling in for the injured Joe Nemechek. He also ran seven Cup races late in the season for Morgan-McClure Motorsports, driving the No. 4 Kodak Chevy to three top-twenty finishes.

=== 2002–2006 ===
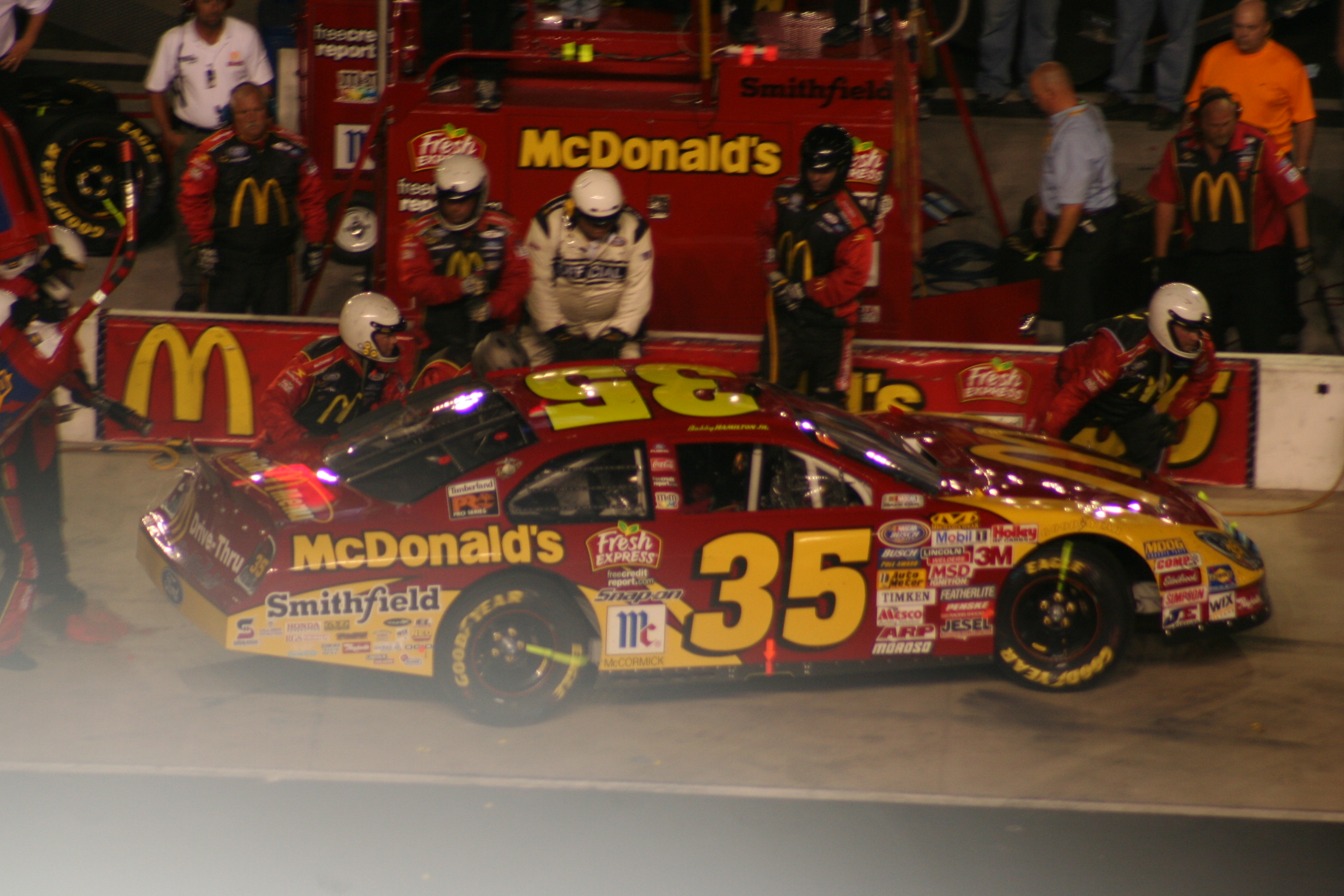
Hamilton at Bristol Motor Speedway in August 2007

In 2002, Hamilton joined Team Rensi Motorsports to drive the No. 25 United States Marine Corps-sponsored Ford Taurus. He won his first career race at New Hampshire and finished eighth in points. He also had his first top-five finish in the Truck Series at Nashville Superspeedway, finishing seventh in his father's Square D entry. He had his statistically career-best season in 2003, where he won four Busch Series races and finished fourth in the final standings. He also partnered with Rensi to run some races at the Winston Cup level, his best finish being a fourteenth at Kansas Speedway in the No. 35 Marines Ford.

Hamilton returned to Rensi in 2004, but did not win a race. He competed in six Nextel Cup events for Phoenix Racing in the No. 09 Miccosukee Indian Gambling-sponsored Dodge and had a best finish of seventeenth. He also drove three times in the Truck Series, winning a pole in his father's No. 04 truck, as well as running twice for HT Motorsports. After 23 Busch races, he left Rensi to move up to the Nextel level, driving the No. 32 Tide-sponsored Chevrolet for PPI Motorsports. He was given the full-time ride for 2005, but struggled immensely, failing to qualify three times and not finishing any higher than eleventh. After driving two events in equipment leased from Front Row Motorsports, Hamilton was let go from PPI at the end of the season.

Without a full-time ride, Hamilton moved to the Truck Series, leasing equipment from the No. 08 team owned by Green Light Racing and running with Corky's Ribs and BBQ sponsorship. After three races, it was announced that his father had been diagnosed with head and neck cancer, and Hamilton was deemed his replacement in the No. 18 Fastenal-sponsored Dodge. He won the pole in his first race in the truck but only mustered a sixteenth place finish in points, as well as dealing with conflicts within the family-run organization. His attempt to run the 2006 Allstate 400 at the Brickyard at the Cup level also failed.

Following his father's death on January 7, 2007, Hamilton was expected to take over ownership of the team; however, he was not part of the management named by the team's backers the following month. The team eventually closed down in 2008.

=== 2007–present ===
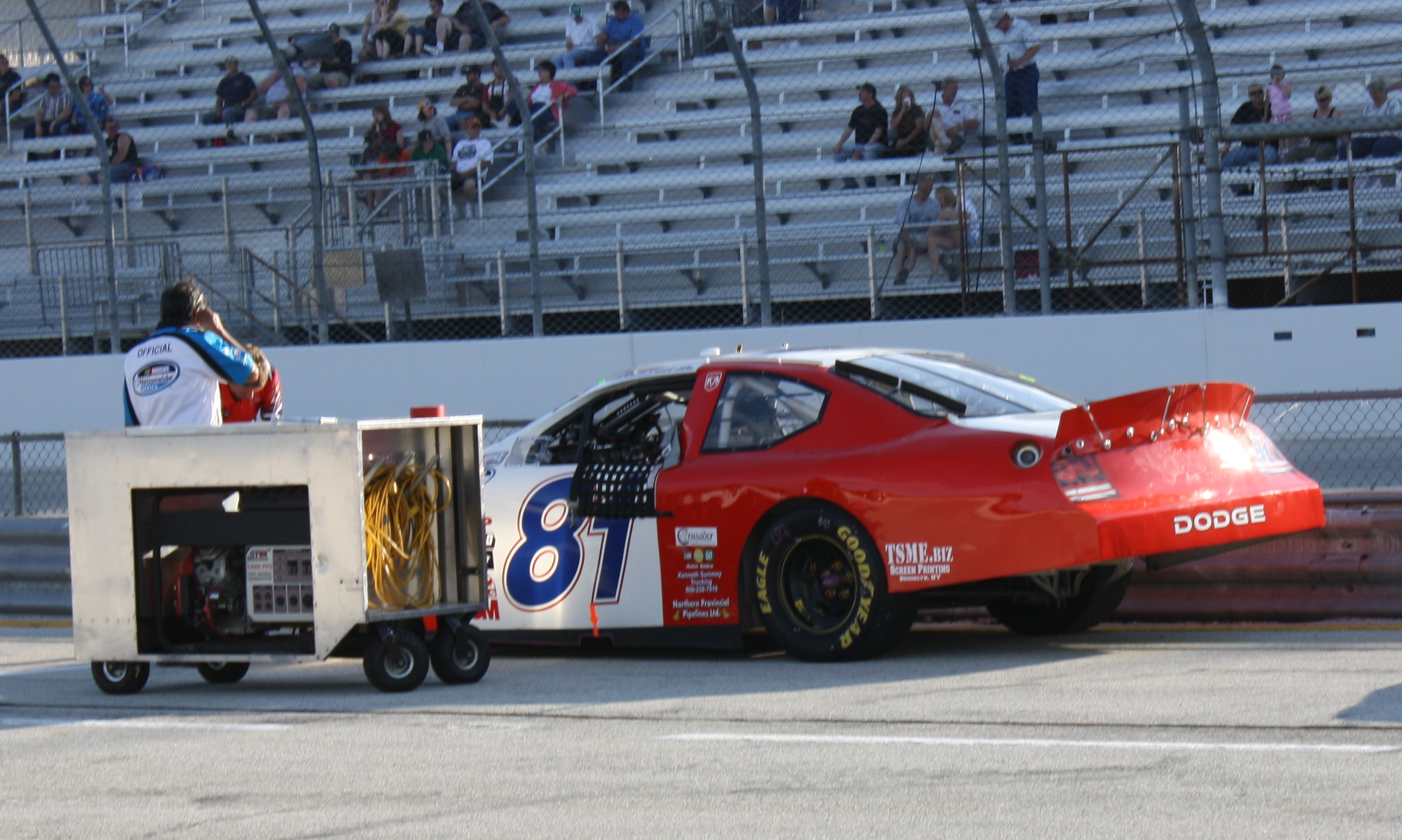
Hamilton's #81 MacDonald Motorsports car in 2009

In 2007, Hamilton returned to the Busch Series and Team Rensi, this time driving the No. 35 McDonald's Ford. He had three top-ten finishes and finished sixth in the final standings. After his #35 team folded in 2008, he moved back to the No. 25 car with Smithfield Foods sponsoring for thirty races. Despite missing two road course events, Hamilton had two top-tens and finished fifteenth in points. The team was ready to close near the end of the season when Smithfield's sponsorship ended, but Hamilton funded the team out of his own pocket for the final few races of the season to keep the team going. He also purchased a small portion of the Sadler Brothers team for whom he had begun his career, allowing them to run a limited schedule in the Nationwide and ARCA RE/MAX Series.

Before the 2009 season, Hamilton purchased a small portion of Rensi Motorsports and merged his own operation with the team, forming the new Rensi-Hamilton Racing operation. The No. 25 team lacked the sponsorship to run Hamilton, and he subsequently drove Randy MacDonald's #81 Dodge for a limited schedule. Hamilton returned to the Truck Series in 2010 for Rick Ware and also ran at Nashville Superspeedway in 2011 with Ware in their No. 1 truck.

After two years away from major-league racing, Hamilton returned to the track in 2014, signing with Carter 2 Motorsports to drive the team's No. 40 Dodge full-time in the ARCA Racing Series; however before his first race with the team, he was released. In 2015, Hamilton resigned with Carter 2 Motorsports to compete in the 2015 ARCA season.

In 2016, Hamilton started Hamilton-Hughes Racing, with none of the three cars entered at Daytona making the field. By the end of May, cars from Hamilton-Hughes Racing were no longer showing up to the track. Most recently Bobby is facing lawsuits from multiple drivers and the team has been evicted from its Russellville, Kentucky shop.

== Other ventures ==
In December 2009, Hamilton purchased Highland Rim Speedway, located in Ridgetop, Tennessee. In late 2010, Hamilton was accused of pulling a gun on a competitor at the track during a dispute; Hamilton stated he legally possessed the weapon and believed he was being threatened. No charges were filed in the case. In April 2011, Hamilton and fellow driver Chad Chaffin acquired a two-year contract for the rights to operate Nashville Fairgrounds Speedway in Nashville, Tennessee. In November 2011, however, they were found by the Nashville State Fair to be in default on their obligations, and in April 2012, Hamilton was named in a lawsuit by Nashville for unpaid obligations related to the contract. Hamilton had declared bankruptcy that January, and the Highland Rim track was sold at public auction in February.

== Personal life ==
Hamilton currently resides in Greenbrier, Tennessee, with his wife Stephanie and a daughter named Haylie.

== Motorsports career results ==
=== NASCAR ===
(key) (Bold – Pole position awarded by qualifying time. Italics – Pole position earned by points standings or practice time. * – Most laps led.)

==== Nextel Cup Series ====
NASCAR Nextel Cup Series results
Year	Team	No.	Make	1	2	3	4	5	6	7	8	9	10	11	12	13	14	15	16	17	18	19	20	21	22	23	24	25	26	27	28	29	30	31	32	33	34	35	36	NNCC	Pts	Ref
2000	Bobby Hamilton Racing	57	Chevy	DAY	CAR	LVS	ATL	DAR	BRI	TEX	MAR	TAL	CAL	RCH	CLT	DOV	MCH	POC	SON	DAY	NHA	POC	IND	GLN	MCH	BRI	DAR	RCH	NHA	DOV	MAR	CLT	TAL	CAR	PHO	HOM; 33				60th	134	
2000	Team SABCO	01	Chevy																																		ATL; 31			60th	134	
2001	Andy Petree Racing	33	Chevy	DAY	CAR	LVS	ATL	DAR	BRI	TEX	MAR	TAL	CAL	RCH	CLT; 39	DOV; 42	MCH; 24	POC	SON	DAY	CHI	NHA	POC	IND	GLN	MCH	BRI	DAR	RCH	DOV	KAN									47th	748	
2001	Morgan-McClure Motorsports	4	Chevy																													CLT; 33	MAR	TAL; 14	PHO; 38	CAR; 17	HOM; 35	ATL; 15	NHA; 37	47th	748	
2003	Team Rensi Motorsports	35	Ford	DAY	CAR	LVS	ATL; DNQ	DAR	BRI	TEX	TAL	MAR	CAL	RCH	CLT	DOV	POC	MCH	SON	DAY	CHI	NHA	POC	IND	GLN	MCH	BRI	DAR	RCH	NHA	DOV	TAL	KAN; 14	CLT	MAR	ATL; 27	PHO	CAR	HOM	55th	264	
2004	Phoenix Racing	09	Dodge	DAY	CAR	LVS	ATL	DAR	BRI	TEX	MAR	TAL	CAL	RCH; 17	CLT; 42	DOV	POC	MCH	SON	DAY; 42	CHI; 41	NHA; 19	POC	IND	GLN	MCH; 38	BRI													39th	1271	
2004	PPI Motorsports	32	Chevy																									CAL; 38	RCH; 11	NHA	DOV; 29	TAL; 43	KAN; 23	CLT; 15	MAR; 36	ATL; 38	PHO; 16	DAR; 31	HOM; 21	39th	1271	
2005	PPI Motorsports	32	Chevy	DAY; 35	CAL; 20	LVS; 11	ATL; 38	BRI; 39	MAR; 40	TEX; 39	PHO; 35	TAL; 40	DAR; 30	RCH; 36	CLT; DNQ	DOV; 21	POC; 23	MCH; 31	SON	DAY; 38	CHI; 21	NHA; 28	POC; 23	IND; 39	GLN	MCH; 35	BRI; 35	CAL; 23	RCH; 43	NHA; 29	DOV; 33	TAL; DNQ	KAN; 43	CLT; 41	MAR; 30	ATL; DNQ	TEX; 38	PHO; 35	HOM; 36	36th	2183	
2005	Front Row Motorsports	32	Chevy																													TAL; 20				ATL; 39				36th	2183	
2006	Bobby Hamilton Racing	04	Dodge	DAY	CAL	LVS; DNQ	ATL	BRI	MAR	TEX	PHO	TAL	RCH	DAR	CLT	DOV	POC	MCH	SON	DAY	CHI	NHA	POC; DNQ	IND; DNQ	GLN	MCH	BRI	CAL	RCH	NHA	DOV	KAN	TAL	CLT	MAR	ATL	TEX	PHO	HOM	NA	-	

===== Daytona 500 =====
Year	Team	Manufacturer	Start	Finish
2005	PPI Motorsports	Chevrolet	22	35

==== Nationwide Series ====
NASCAR Nationwide Series results
Year	Team	No.	Make	1	2	3	4	5	6	7	8	9	10	11	12	13	14	15	16	17	18	19	20	21	22	23	24	25	26	27	28	29	30	31	32	33	34	35	NNSC	Pts	Ref
1998	Sadler Brothers Racing	95	Pontiac	DAY	CAR	LVS	NSV	DAR	BRI	TEX	HCY	TAL	NHA	NZH	CLT	DOV	RCH	PPR	GLN	MLW	MYB	CAL	SBO	IRP	MCH	BRI	DAR	RCH; DNQ	DOV	CLT	GTY	CAR; 37	ATL; 20	HOM					83rd	160	
1999	Sadler Brothers Racing	95	Chevy	DAY; 30	CAR; 27	LVS; DNQ	ATL; DNQ	DAR; 27	TEX; DNQ	NSV; DNQ	BRI	TAL; 33	CAL	NHA	RCH; DNQ	NZH	CLT	DOV	SBO																				39th	1351	
1999	HVP Motorsports	63	Chevy																	GLN; 26	MLW; 39	MYB; DNQ	PPR; 21	GTY; 28	IRP; 42	MCH; 23	BRI; DNQ												39th	1351	
1999	Carroll Racing	22	Chevy																									DAR; 42	RCH; 41	DOV; 21	CLT; 30	CAR; 39	MEM; 22	PHO; 30	HOM; 9				39th	1351	
2000	Carroll Racing	26	Chevy	DAY; 28	CAR; 21	LVS; 41	ATL; 38	DAR; 30	BRI; 36	TEX; 29	NSV; 19	TAL; 4	CAL; 35	RCH; 14	NHA; 11	CLT; 23	DOV; 37	SBO; 14	MYB; 18	GLN; 21	MLW; 13	NZH; 33	PPR; 17	GTY; 19	IRP; 24	MCH; 18	BRI; 38	DAR; 43	RCH; 33	DOV; 13	CLT; 7	CAR; 25	MEM; 7	PHO; 24	**HOM**; 22				19th	2968	
2001	Carroll Racing	26	Chevy	DAY; 33	CAR; 5	LVS; 37	ATL; 36	DAR; 6	BRI; 23	TEX; 19	NSH; 26	TAL; 23	**CAL**; 14	RCH; 24	NHA; 7	NZH; 7	CLT; 14	DOV; 28	KEN; 12	MLW; 34	GLN; 29	CHI; 41	GTY; 18	PPR; 15	IRP; 19	MCH; 21	BRI; 32	DAR; 5	RCH; 33	DOV; 13	KAN; 34	CLT; 12	MEM; 15	PHO; 36	CAR; 21	HOM; 26			17th	3267	
2002	Team Rensi Motorsports	25	Ford	DAY; 30	CAR; 16	LVS; 11	DAR; 12	BRI; 13	TEX; 8	NSH; 3	TAL; 22	CAL; 37	RCH; 25*	NHA; 1*	NZH; 6	CLT; 7	DOV; 3	NSH; 2	KEN; 36	MLW; 7	DAY; 33	CHI; 9	GTY; 17	PPR; 12	IRP; 31	MCH; 5	BRI; 32	DAR; 6	RCH; 14	DOV; 30	KAN; 8	CLT; 9	MEM; 37	ATL; 8	CAR; 29	PHO; 24	HOM; 5		8th	4058	
2003	Team Rensi Motorsports	25	Ford	DAY; 7	CAR; 13	LVS; 34	DAR; 12	BRI; 6	TEX; 40	TAL; 35	NSH; 10*	CAL; 18	RCH; 10	GTY; 5	NZH; 9	CLT; 13	DOV; 6	NSH; 5	KEN; 1*	MLW; 10	DAY; 22	CHI; 1*	NHA; 6	**PPR**; 25	IRP; 35	MCH; 3	BRI; 34	DAR; 4	RCH; 3	DOV; 2	KAN; 19	CLT; 7	MEM; 1	ATL; 3	PHO; 1*	CAR; 3	HOM; 3		4th	4588	
2004	Team Rensi Motorsports	25	Ford	DAY; 13	CAR; 8	LVS; 5	DAR; 19	BRI; 24	TEX; 5	NSH; 27	TAL; 24	CAL; 10	GTY; 4	RCH; 4	NZH; 2*	CLT; 13	DOV; 4	NSH; 23	KEN; 28*	MLW; 5	DAY; 12	**CHI**; 43	NHA; 9	PPR; 10	IRP; 6	MCH; 29	BRI	CAL	RCH	DOV	KAN	CLT	MEM	ATL	PHO	DAR	HOM		22nd	2896	
2007	Team Rensi Motorsports	35	Ford	DAY; 24	CAL; 29	MXC; 17	LVS; 14	ATL; 24	BRI; 18	NSH; 9	TEX; 14	PHO; 34	TAL; 12	RCH; 22	DAR; 20	CLT; 33	DOV; 10	NSH; 13	KEN; 36	MLW; 13	NHA; 20	DAY; 12	CHI; 29	GTY; 13	IRP; 13	CGV; 24	GLN; 22	MCH; 27	BRI; 12	CAL; 21	RCH; 16	DOV; 12	KAN; 20	CLT; 16	MEM; 38	TEX; 14	PHO; 24	HOM; 8	6th	3667	
2008	Team Rensi Motorsports	25	Ford	DAY; 22	CAL; 20	LVS; 12	ATL; 23	BRI; 17	NSH; 10	TEX; 23	PHO; 13	MXC	TAL; 3	RCH; 17	DAR; 30	CLT; 18	DOV; 14	NSH; 30	KEN; 21	MLW; 15	NHA; 16	DAY; 15	CHI; 19	GTY; 20	IRP; 14	CGV	GLN; 16	MCH; 18	BRI; 18	CAL; 19	RCH; 14	DOV; 15	KAN; 25	CLT; 37	MEM; 21	TEX; 16	PHO; 18	HOM; 21	15th	3566	
2009	MacDonald Motorsports	81	Dodge	DAY	CAL	LVS	BRI	TEX	NSH	PHO	TAL	RCH	DAR	CLT	DOV; 15	NSH; 14	KEN; 27	MLW; 19	NHA; 29	DAY	CHI	GTY							ATL; 30	RCH; 23	DOV; 28	KAN	CAL	CLT	MEM	TEX	PHO	HOM	53rd	846	
2009	Rensi-Hamilton Motorsports	25	Ford																				IRP; 22	IOW	GLN	MCH	BRI	CGV											53rd	846	

==== Camping World Truck Series ====
NASCAR Camping World Truck Series results
Year	Team	No.	Make	1	2	3	4	5	6	7	8	9	10	11	12	13	14	15	16	17	18	19	20	21	22	23	24	25	NCWTC	Pts	Ref
2001	Bobby Hamilton Racing	4	Dodge	DAY	HOM	MMR	MAR	GTY	DAR	PPR	DOV	TEX	MEM	MLW; 33	KAN	KEN	NHA	IRP	NSH	CIC	NZH	RCH	SBO	TEX	LVS	PHO	CAL		126th	-	
2002	Bobby Hamilton Racing	4	Dodge	DAY	DAR	MAR	GTY	PPR	DOV	TEX	MEM	MLW	KAN	KEN	NHA	MCH	IRP	NSH; 4	RCH	TEX	SBO	LVS	CAL	PHO	HOM				70th	165	
2004	Bobby Hamilton Racing	04	Dodge	DAY	ATL	MAR	MFD	CLT	DOV	TEX	MEM	MLW	KAN	KEN	GTW	MCH	IRP	**NSH**; 4	BRI	RCH	NHA	LVS	CAL	TEX					46th	395	
2004	HT Motorsports	59	Dodge																						MAR; 9	PHO	DAR; 27	HOM	46th	395	
2006	Bobby Hamilton Racing	08	Dodge	DAY; 7	CAL; 22	ATL; 19																							16th	2671	
2006	Bobby Hamilton Racing	18	Dodge				**MAR**; 10	GTY; 7	CLT; 21	MFD; 18	DOV; 13	TEX; 25	MCH; 28	MLW; 31	KAN; 15	KEN; 24	MEM; 35	IRP; 31	NSH; 13	BRI; 9	NHA; 26	LVS; 26	TAL; 13	MAR; 32	ATL; 9	TEX; 12	PHO; 32	HOM; 4	16th	2671	
2010	Rick Ware Racing	6	Chevy	DAY	ATL	MAR	NSH	KAN	DOV	CLT	TEX	MCH	IOW	GTW	IRP	POC; 32	NSH; 24	DAR											42nd	679	
2010	Rick Ware Racing	47	Chevy																BRI; 13	CHI	KEN	NHA; 10	LVS	MAR	TAL	TEX; 13	PHO; 10	HOM	42nd	679	
2011	Rick Ware Racing	1	Chevy	DAY	PHO	DAR	MAR	NSH; 22	DOV	CLT	KAN	TEX	KEN	IOW	NSH	IRP	POC	MCH	BRI	ATL	CHI	NHA	KEN	LVS	TAL	MAR	TEX	HOM	64th	22	

=== ARCA Racing Series ===
(key) (Bold – Pole position awarded by qualifying time. Italics – Pole position earned by points standings or practice time. * – Most laps led.)

ARCA Racing Series results
Year	Team	No.	Make	1	2	3	4	5	6	7	8	9	10	11	12	13	14	15	16	17	18	19	20	21	22	ARSC	Pts	Ref
1998	Bobby Hamilton Racing	43	Pontiac	DAY	ATL	SLM	CLT	MEM	MCH	POC; 5	SBS	TOL	PPR	POC; 25	KIL	FRS	ISF	ATL	DSF	SLM	TEX	WIN				N/A	-	
1998	Sadler Brothers Racing	95	Chevy																				CLT; 3	TAL; 5	**ATL**; 2*	N/A	-	
1999	Sadler Brothers Racing	95	Chevy	DAY; 3	ATL	SLM	AND	CLT; 16	MCH; 23	POC; DNQ	TOL	SBS	BLN	POC	KIL	FRS	FLM	ISF	WIN	DSF	SLM	CLT	TAL	ATL		56th	505	
2015	Carter 2 Motorsports	97	Dodge	DAY; 26	MOB; 13	NSH; 12	SLM; 18	TAL; 22	TOL; 8	NJE; 13	POC; 19	MCH; 19	CHI; 15	WIN	IOW	IRP	POC	BLN	ISF	DSF	SLM	KEN	KAN			14th	1975	
2016	Hamilton-Hughes Racing	4	Dodge	DAY; DNQ	NSH	SLM																				120th	130	
2016	Hamilton-Hughes Racing	64	Dodge				TAL; 25	TOL	NJM	POC	MCH	MAD	WIN	IOW	IRP	POC	BLN	ISF	DSF	SLM	CHI	KEN	KAN			120th	130	

^{*} Season still in progress
^{1} Ineligible for series points
