= 2004 Pepsi 400 =

Race details
- Race 17 of 36 in the 2004 NASCAR Nextel Cup Series
- Map of the track
- Date: July 3, 2004
- Location: Daytona International Speedway in Daytona Beach, Florida
- Course: Permanent racing facility
- Course length: 2.5 miles (4.02 km)
- Distance: 160 laps, 400 mi (643.27 km)
- Weather: Temperatures reaching as low as 70 °F (21 °C); wind speeds up to 16.9 miles per hour (27.2 km/h)
- Average speed: 145.117 miles per hour (233.543 km/h)

Pole position
| Driver | Jeff Gordon | Hendrick Motorsports |

Most laps led
| Driver | Jeff Gordon | Hendrick Motorsports |
- Laps: 61

Winner
| No. 24 | Jeff Gordon | Hendrick Motorsports |

Television in the United States
- Network: Fox
- Announcers: Mike Joy, Darrell Waltrip, Larry McReynolds
- Nielsen ratings: 5.2

The 2004 Pepsi 400 was the 17th race of the 2004 NASCAR Nextel Cup Series season. It was held on July 3, 2004 at Daytona International Speedway in Daytona Beach, Florida. Jeff Gordon of Hendrick Motorsports won the race from the pole position and also led the most laps.

== Race ==
The race was delayed for two hours due to rain. Former Jacksonville Jaguars quarterback Byron Leftwich was the grand marshal for the race; NBA All-Star Tracy McGrady was originally the grand marshal but was replaced by Leftwich due to scheduling conflicts.

Ten laps into the race, Michael Waltrip passed pole-sitter, Jeff Gordon, for the lead. On Lap 19, the caution flag was thrown after a multi-car accident. Waltrip continued leading until Lap 55, in which Dale Earnhardt, Inc. teammate Dale Earnhardt Jr. After Bobby Hamilton Jr. had an accident on Lap 70, Earnhardt led the race into pit road, but was pushed out by Gordon and Brian Vickers, and fell to fifteenth, giving Mike Wallace the lead entering Lap 74. Shepherd pitted on the following lap, and Morgan Shepherd took the lead. However, Shepherd would later pit, as Gordon regained the lead. Waltrip then retook the lead from Gordon on Lap 86, though Gordon then took the lead again 13 laps later. Ten laps later, Gordon pitted, and Waltrip was given the lead. On the ensuing lap, Earnhardt took the lead, though he later pitted, and Jimmy Spencer gained the lead. On Lap 113, Spencer lost the lead to Gordon when he pitted, who led the pit stops on Lap 139. Dave Blaney stayed out, and took the lead, though Ryan Newman gained first-place when Blaney went to pit road. Newman pitted on Lap 143, giving Tony Stewart the lead. With ten laps left in the race, Hendrick Motorsports teammates Jeff Gordon and Jimmie Johnson followed in third and fourth, respectively, behind Tony Stewart and Dale Earnhardt Jr. Johnson then pushed Gordon past Stewart and Earnhardt, and Gordon subsequently won, his fourth of the season and second consecutive. The victory by Gordon made him the first driver since Cale Yarborough to win the Pepsi 400 from the pole. A version of the race's waning moments was included in the prologue of the video game NASCAR 06: Total Team Control, which involved Johnson pushing Gordon past Earnhardt.

Notably, Pepsi's rival Coca-Cola heavily promoted their new brand Coca-Cola C2 throughout the pre-race activities, and sponsored eight cars: the #1 driven by John Andretti, the #16 driven by Greg Biffle, the #20 driven by Tony Stewart, the #21 driven by Ricky Rudd, the #29 driven by Kevin Harvick, the #97 driven by Kurt Busch, the #98 driven by Bill Elliott, and the #99 driven by Jeff Burton. Ironically, despite this act of "ambush marketing", the Pepsi-sponsored Gordon won the race.

== Race results ==
1. Jeff Gordon
2. Jimmie Johnson
3. Dale Earnhardt Jr.
4. Kurt Busch
5. Tony Stewart
6. Mark Martin
7. Bobby Labonte
8. Terry Labonte
9. Brian Vickers
10. Joe Nemechek
11. Casey Mears
12. Ryan Newman
13. Michael Waltrip
14. Kevin Harvick
15. Dave Blaney
16. Dale Jarrett
17. Ricky Rudd
18. Bill Elliott
19. Robby Gordon
20. Sterling Marlin
21. Scott Riggs
22. Jeremy Mayfield
23. Jeff Burton
24. Kyle Petty
25. Kasey Kahne
26. Elliott Sadler
27. Rusty Wallace
28. Kerry Earnhardt
29. Jimmy Spencer
30. Jeff Green
31. Greg Biffle
32. Scott Wimmer
33. Morgan Shepherd
34. Larry Gunselman
35. Ken Schrader
36. Brendan Gaughan
37. Jamie McMurray
38. Ricky Craven
39. Matt Kenseth
40. Ward Burton
41. Mike Wallace
42. Bobby Hamilton Jr.
43. John Andretti

Did not qualify

- Chad Blount
- Tony Raines
- Derrike Cope
- Eric McClure
- Kenny Wallace
- Kirk Shelmerdine

== Standings after the race ==
| Pos | Driver | Points |
|---|---|---|
| 1 | Jimmie Johnson | 2545 |
| 2 | Dale Earnhardt Jr. | 2518 |
| 3 | Jeff Gordon | 2313 |
| 4 | Tony Stewart | 2203 |
| 5 | Matt Kenseth | 2189 |

| Previous race: 2004 Dodge/Save Mart 350 | Nextel Cup Series; 2004 season | Next race: 2004 Tropicana 400 |
