= NASCAR Cup Series at Chicagoland Speedway =

NASCAR Cup Series race at Chicagoland Speedway

eero 400

NASCAR Cup Series
- Venue: Chicagoland Speedway
- Location: Joliet, Illinois, United States
- First race: 2001
- Distance: 400.5 miles (644.5 km)
- Laps: 267; Stages 1/2: 80 each Final stage: 107
- Previous names: Tropicana 400 (2001–2004); USG Sheetrock 400 (2005–2007); LifeLock.com 400 (2008–2010); GEICO 400 (2011–2013); MyAFibStory.com 400 (2014); MyAFibRisk.com 400 (2015); Teenage Mutant Ninja Turtles 400 (2016); Tales of the Turtles 400 (2017); Overton's 400 (2018); Camping World 400 (2019)
- Most wins (driver): Tony Stewart (3)
- Most wins (team): Joe Gibbs Racing (7)
- Most wins (manufacturer): Chevrolet (9)

Circuit information
- Surface: Asphalt
- Length: 1.5 mi (2.4 km)
- Turns: 4

Stock car races in the NASCAR Cup Series are held at the Chicagoland Speedway in Joliet, Illinois, currently known as the eero 400 for sponsorship reasons. Previously, the race was held in July from 2001 through 2010, with night races held from 2008 to 2010. From 2011 to 2017, the races were held as the first race of the Cup Series playoffs in the round of 16. In 2018, as part of the schedule realignment, the race was held on the last weekend of June. The race was placed on hiatus from 2020 to 2025 and returned in 2026.

Chase Briscoe is the defending winner of the race.

== Race history ==
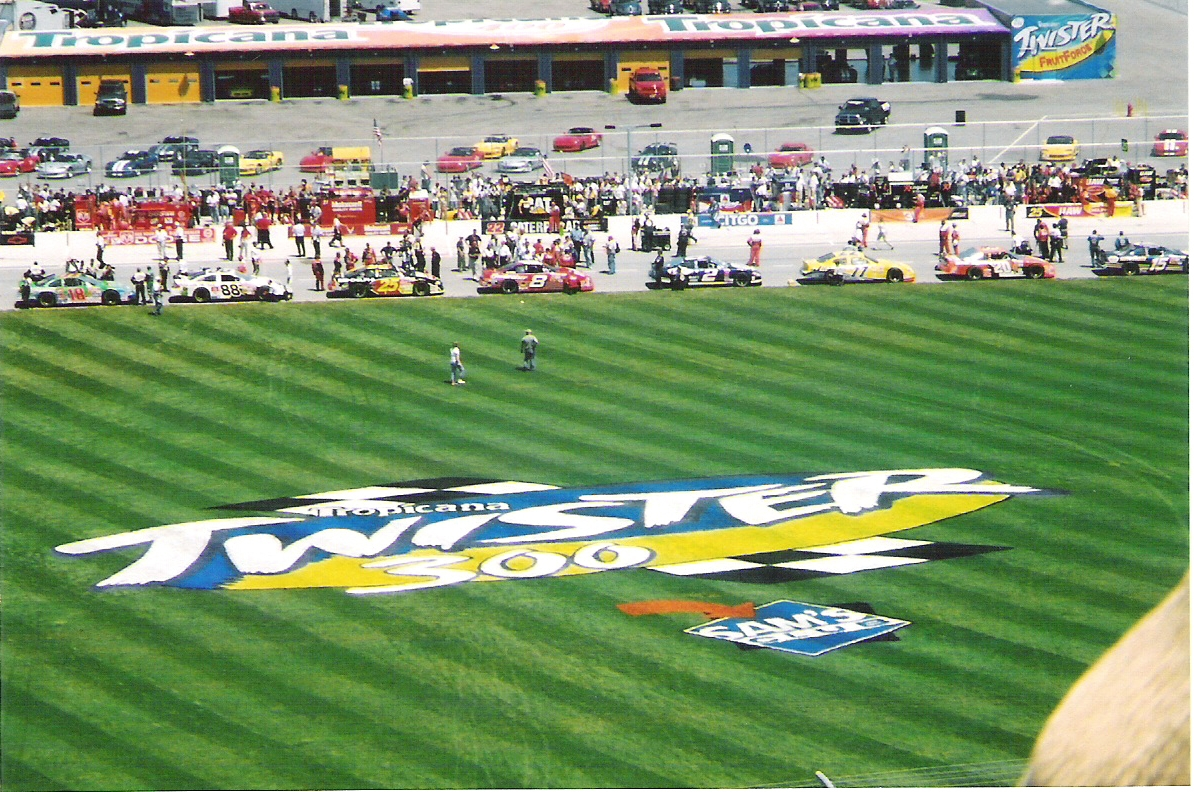
2002 pre-race

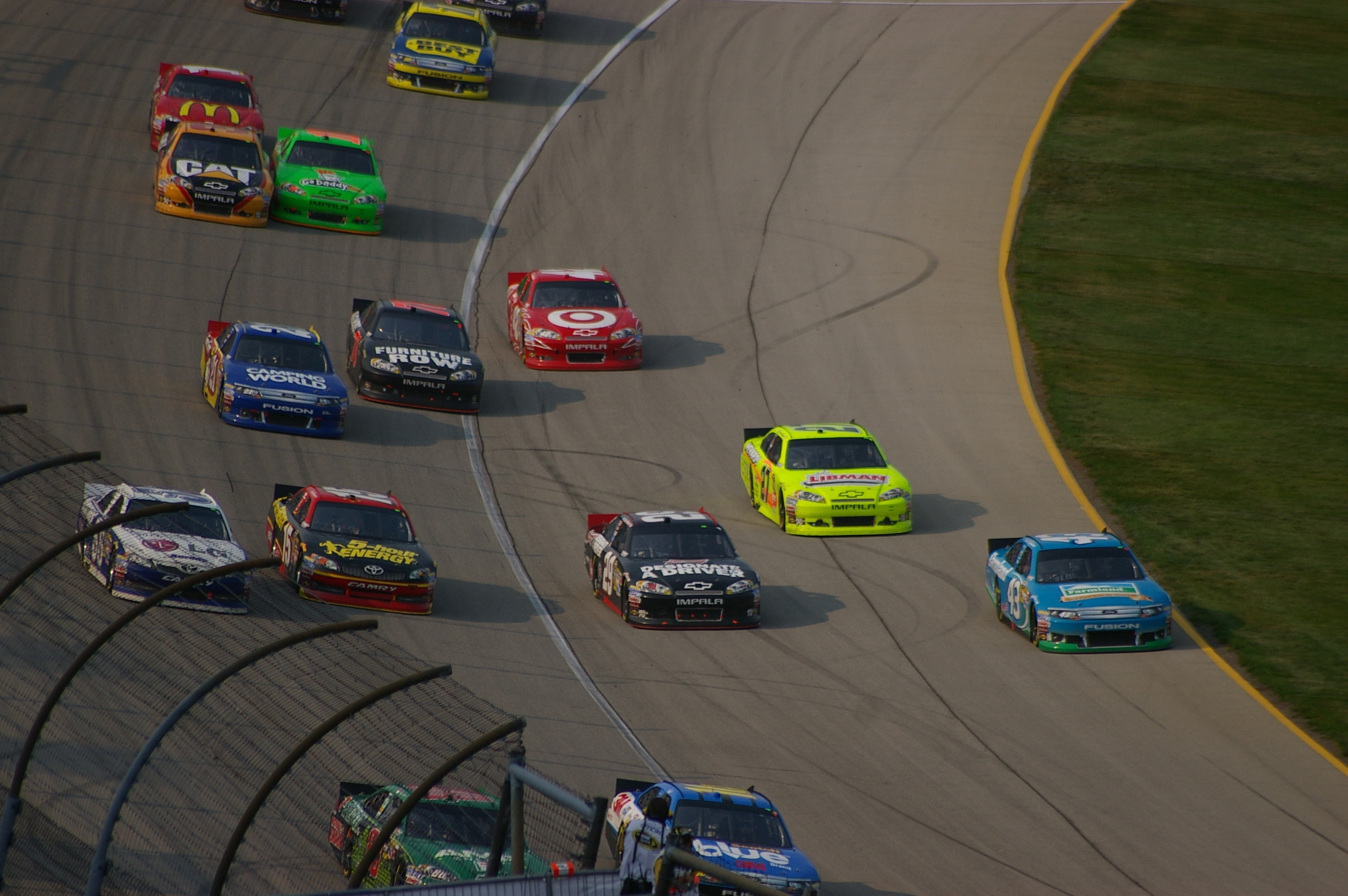
Race action in 2012.

In May 2000, as Chicagoland Speedway was under construction, it was announced that the track would hold a NASCAR Winston Cup Series race beginning in the 2001 season. Tropicana served as the race's sponsor from 2001 to 2004, followed by USG Corporation from 2005 to 2007, LifeLock from 2008 to 2010, GEICO from 2011 to 2013, Johnson & Johnson's Janssen Pharmaceuticals from 2014 to 2015, and Nickelodeon has sponsored the race through the network's SpongeBob SquarePants and Teenage Mutant Ninja Turtles series since 2016. Kevin Harvick won the first two runnings of the race in 2001 and 2002, while Tony Stewart has the most wins in the race's history, having won it three times, in 2004, 2007, and 2011. Traditionally run in early to mid-July, the race became the opening race of the NASCAR playoffs in 2011, moving the race to mid-September in the process. Since a schedule realignment in 2018, the race returned to a July race weekend with Overton being the sponsor. In 2019, the race was sponsored by Camping World.

The race was scheduled to be held in 2020, however due to the COVID-19 pandemic, the race was canceled. The race was dropped from the 2021 schedule. However, there have been rumors that Chicagoland may make a return in 2026, with NASCAR itself making plans to return as well. On July 30, 2025, an article was published by The Athletic in which they announced that Chicago Street Race will not be returning in 2026, with Chicagoland expected to take its place. On August 20, 2025, it was officially announced that Chicagoland would return.

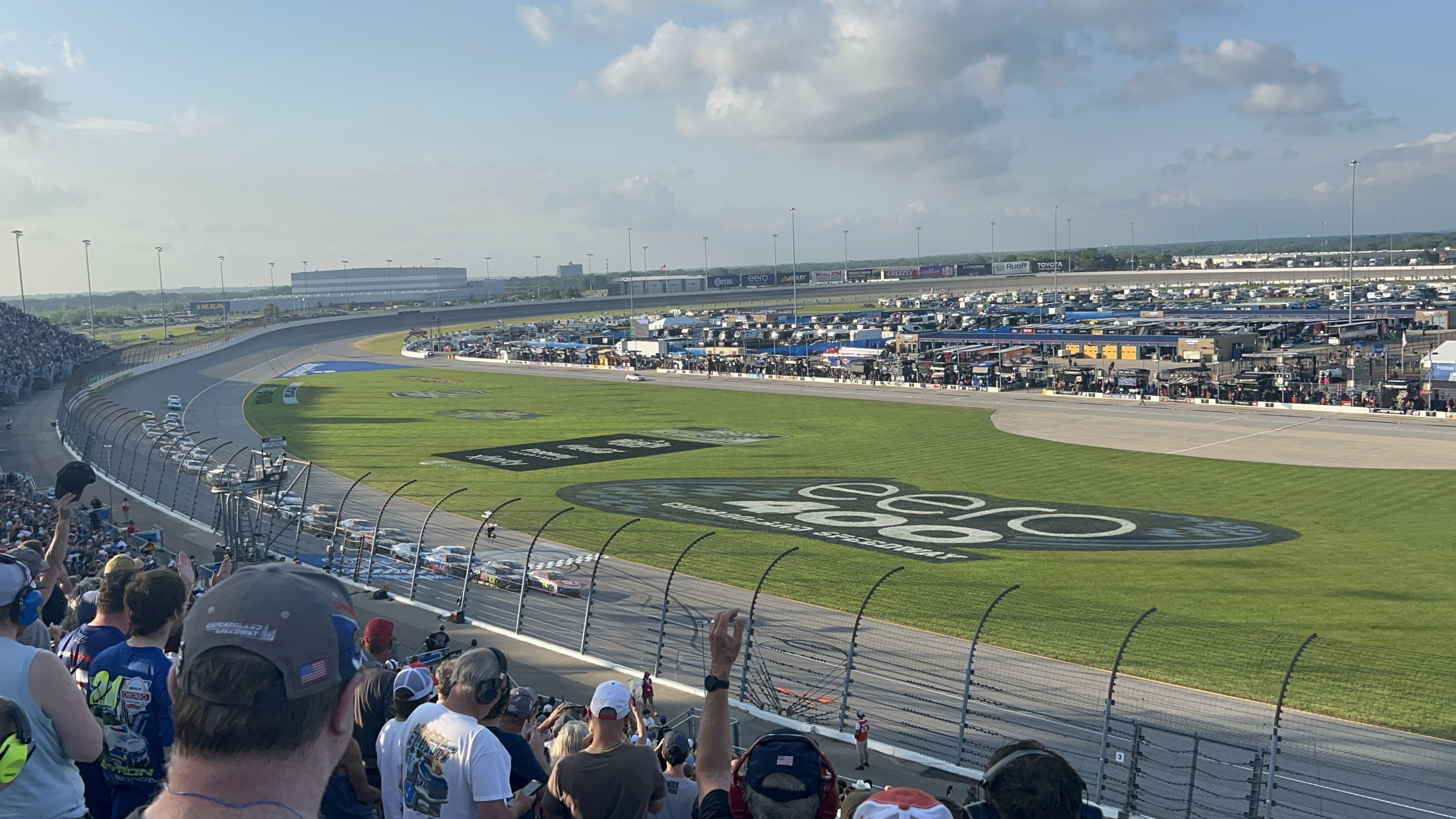
A restart during the 2026 eero 400

On May 21, 2026, eero, who sponsored the Truck Series race at Richmond in 2025, was announced as the title sponsor. In a successful first event back, Chase Briscoe won the race. On August 18, 2026, it was announced that Chicagoland will return in 2027.

== Past winners ==
Year	Date	No.	Driver	Team	Manufacturer	Race distance		Race time	Average speed (mph)	Report	Ref
Year	Date	No.	Driver	Team	Manufacturer	Laps	Miles (km)	Race time	Average speed (mph)	Report	Ref
2001	July 15	29	Kevin Harvick	Richard Childress Racing	Chevrolet	267	400.5 (644.542)	3:18:16	121.2	Report	
2002	July 14	29	Kevin Harvick	Richard Childress Racing	Chevrolet	267	400.5 (644.542)	2:55:37	136.832	Report	
2003	July 13	12	Ryan Newman	Penske Racing	Dodge	267	400.5 (644.542)	2:59:15	134.59	Report	
2004	July 11	20	Tony Stewart	Joe Gibbs Racing	Chevrolet	267	400.5 (644.542)	3:05:33	129.507	Report	
2005	July 10	8	Dale Earnhardt Jr.	Dale Earnhardt, Inc.	Chevrolet	267	400.5 (644.542)	3:08:16	127.638	Report	
2006	July 9	24	Jeff Gordon	Hendrick Motorsports	Chevrolet	270*	405 (651.784)	3:03:59	132.077	Report	
2007	July 15	20	Tony Stewart	Joe Gibbs Racing	Chevrolet	267	400.5 (644.542)	2:58:59	134.258	Report	
2008	July 12	18	Kyle Busch	Joe Gibbs Racing	Toyota	267	400.5 (644.542)	2:59:20	133.936	Report	
2009	July 11	5	Mark Martin	Hendrick Motorsports	Chevrolet	267	400.5 (644.542)	2:59:39	133.804	Report	
2010	July 10	00	David Reutimann	Michael Waltrip Racing	Toyota	267	400.5 (644.542)	2:45:34	145.138	Report	
2011	September 19*	14	Tony Stewart	Stewart–Haas Racing	Chevrolet	267	400.5 (644.542)	2:47:41	143.306	Report	
2012	September 16	2	Brad Keselowski	Penske Racing	Dodge	267	400.5 (644.542)	2:47:37	143.363	Report	
2013*	September 15	20	Matt Kenseth	Joe Gibbs Racing	Toyota	267	400.5 (644.542)	3:10:56	125.855	Report	
2014	September 14	2	Brad Keselowski	Team Penske	Ford	267	400.5 (644.542)	2:48:50	142.33	Report	
2015	September 20	11	Denny Hamlin	Joe Gibbs Racing	Toyota	267	400.5 (644.542)	2:51:30	140.117	Report	
2016	September 18	78	Martin Truex Jr.	Furniture Row Racing	Toyota	270*	405 (651.784)	2:47:24	145.161	Report	
2017	September 17	78	Martin Truex Jr.	Furniture Row Racing	Toyota	267	400.5 (644.542)	2:45:16	145.401	Report	
2018	July 1	18	Kyle Busch	Joe Gibbs Racing	Toyota	267	400.5 (644.542)	2:50:52	140.636	Report	
2019	June 30	88	Alex Bowman	Hendrick Motorsports	Chevrolet	267	400.5 (644.542)	2:50:49	140.677	Report	
2020	June 21	Race canceled due to the COVID-19 pandemic.									
2021 – 2025	Not held										
2026	July 5	19	Chase Briscoe	Joe Gibbs Racing	Toyota	267	400.5 (644.542)	3:09:18	126.941	Report	
2027	June 27									Report	

- 2006 and 2016: Race extended due to a NASCAR Overtime finish.
- 2011: Race postponed from Sunday to Monday due to rain.
- 2020: Race canceled and moved to Darlington due to the COVID-19 pandemic.

=== Multiple winners (drivers) ===
# Wins	Driver	Years won
3	Tony Stewart	2004, 2007, 2011
2	Kevin Harvick	2001, 2002
2	Brad Keselowski	2012, 2014
2	Martin Truex Jr.	2016, 2017
2	Kyle Busch	2008, 2018

=== Multiple winners (teams) ===
# Wins	Team	Years won
7	Joe Gibbs Racing	2004, 2007, 2008, 2013, 2015, 2018, 2026
3	Team Penske	2003, 2012, 2014
3	Hendrick Motorsports	2006, 2009, 2019
2	Richard Childress Racing	2001, 2002
2	Furniture Row Racing	2016, 2017

=== Manufacturer wins ===
# Wins	Manufacturer	Years won
9	Chevrolet	2001, 2002, 2004–2007, 2009, 2011, 2019
8	Toyota	2008, 2010, 2013, 2015-2018, 2026
2	Dodge	2003, 2012
1	Ford	2014

== Race reports ==
- 2001: The race was the inaugural race hosted in Chicago. The dominant car was rookie Kevin Harvick who led 113 of 267 laps. The pole-sitter was Todd Bodine and teammate Jimmy Spencer rounded out the front row for Travis Carter Enterprises. Harvick went on to win the race, his second Cup victory, narrowly beating Robert Pressley.
- 2002: Ryan Newman won the pole but Kevin Harvick won his second race at Chicagoland in a row after starting from 32nd.
- 2003: Tony Stewart won the pole for the race. The race was notable for what happened on lap 214 when Johnny Benson crashed starting a chain reaction crash collecting 6 other cars. In the crash, Bobby Labonte's car hit the wall in turn 3 and the rear of his car caught on fire. Labonte was able to crawl out of his car which he fell to the ground shaken but ok. His crew had recently fully fueled the car during the last caution which made it difficult for the fire crews to put out the fire on Labonte's car. Ryan Newman ended up winning the race.
- 2004: Jeff Gordon won the pole for the race. The race was notable for what happened on lap 127. Rookie Kasey Kahne was the leader on the restart when Tony Stewart jumped to the outside of Sterling Marlin, who was behind Kahne, and got into the back of Kasey Kahne turning him into the wall ruining his chances to win the race. Frustrated, Kahne's crew chief Tommy Baldwin Jr. and his crew went over to talk to Stewart's crew chief Greg Zipidelli when a fight broke out between the two crews in Stewart's pit box. To make matters even worse for Kahne and his crew, Stewart would go on to win the race picking up his first win of 2004.
- 2005: Jimmie Johnson won the pole for the event. Dale Earnhardt Jr. gambled on a two-tire stop and beat Matt Kenseth to pick up his first win of 2005.
- 2006: Jeff Burton won the pole for the race. In the closing laps of the race, it was a battle for the lead between Matt Kenseth and Jeff Gordon, who both have a history dating back to that year's Food City 500 at Bristol. With 4 to go, Gordon got to Kenseth's rear bumper in turn 1. In turn 2, Gordon got into Kenseth and spun Kenseth around bringing out a caution and setting up a green-white-checker finish. Gordon would go on to the race.
- 2007: Casey Mears won the pole for the race but Tony Stewart had the most dominating car of the race and won the race.
- 2008: Kyle Busch won the pole and won the race. Before the race began, it had rained. Busch began to celebrate and went to the grass but Busch ended up getting stuck in the grass.
- 2009: Brian Vickers won the pole for the race but Mark Martin won the race picking up his 4th win of 2009.
- 2010: The race began the pre-race ceremonies by giving the invocation. Afterward, Jim Cornelison, the Chicago Blackhawks national anthem singer, performed the United States National Anthem while Duncan Keith gave the command to start engines. Kevin Harvick drove his race car to the garage area. On lap 197, it was said that Harvick's crew members were changing a fuel pump. On lap 212, Edwards passed McMurray for the fourth position. One lap later, Reutimann passed Jeff Gordon for the first position. Fifteen laps later, Biffle's engine failed. One lap later, Johnson made a scheduled green-flag pit stop. On lap 233 Bowyer claimed the lead as Reutimann came to pit lane for a pit stop. Afterward, Edwards and Montoya led as green flag pit stops continued. Green flag pit stops finished on lap 236 after Reutimann reclaimed the lead. On lap 242 Edwards claimed the second position from Jeff Gordon. Reutimann remained the leader and crossed the finish line first to clinch his second career victory in the Sprint Cup Series. Edwards finished second ahead of Jeff Gordon, Clint Bowyer, and Jamie McMurray.
- 2011: This was Chicagoland's first race to be the hosting site for the first race of NASCAR's Chase for the Cup. The race was delayed to Monday due to rain with Matt Kenseth winning the pole. Tony Stewart won the race on fuel mileage to pick up his first of 5 wins in that season's chase that resulted in his third Cup Championship.
- 2012: Jimmie Johnson won the pole for the race and led the most laps of the race but Brad Keselowski won the race to pick up his 4th win of 2012.
- 2013: Joey Logano won the pole for the race. The race started an hour late due to rain. On lap 109, the race was halted again due to rain. The race ended at nightfall and Matt Kenseth won the race to pick up his 6th win of 2013.
- 2014: Almirola made his final stop as the caution came out with 36 laps to go after Carl Edwards' car cut down a left-rear tire, and Larson cycled back to the lead in the process. While pitting, Almirola blew his car's engine, and he retired from the race. Almirola later described himself as "heartbroken" with the result. The race restarted with 30 laps to go but only ran for a handful of laps before Clint Bowyer brought out the fifth caution of the race, with 23 laps to go, after he hit the wall in turn 1. The race restarted with 18 laps to go, Harvick and Larson raced hard with each other for the lead but Brad Keselowski shot through in between them to take the lead with 16 to go. The caution flags flew for the sixth time with ten laps to go after Ricky Stenhouse Jr. and Danica Patrick made contact on the front stretch. Upon exiting her car, Patrick stated that she "talked with Ricky afterward and we're fine". The race restarted with six laps to go and Brad Keselowski coasted on to victory lane, for his second successive win. Keselowski expressed his delight at the result, stating that he "was waiting for an opportunity to strike and it came. The car stuck and everything came together".
- 2015: After drag racing through the front stretch, Kurt Busch passed his brother for the lead with 46 laps to go. Edwards began the final cycle of pit stops with 29 laps to go. Kurt Busch pitted with 28 laps to go and handed the lead to Hamlin. Hamlin pitted with 24 laps to go and handed the lead to teammate Matt Kenseth. Kenseth hit pit road with 23 laps to go and the lead cycled back to Kurt Busch. Allmendinger was tagged for speeding on pit road and was forced to serve a drive-through penalty. Debris in turn 2 brought out the sixth caution of the race with 10 laps to go. The debris were pieces of a brake rotor that came from the No. 83 car of Matt DiBenedetto. "Did the yellow even need to come out? I don't even know," Kurt Busch said after the race. He, Gordon, and Hamlin opted to stay out while the rest of the lead lap cars opted to pit. The race restarted with five laps to go. Gordon got a good start on Kurt, but he was passed underneath by Hamlin, forced up the track, and ultimately finished 14th. Denny drove on to score his 26th career victory.
- 2016: Chase Elliott was leading the race and looked like he was gonna pick up his first Cup Series win. But Michael McDowell blew a tire and hit the wall bringing out a caution and sending the race into overtime. The race restarted with two laps to go in overtime, Blaney was no match on old tires against Truex on new tires. Truex passed him on the backstretch with two to go and drove on to score the victory.
- 2017: This would be the final race for Chicagoland to host the first race of the NASCAR Chase. Kyle Busch won the pole but Martin Truex Jr. picked up the win for his 5th win of 2017

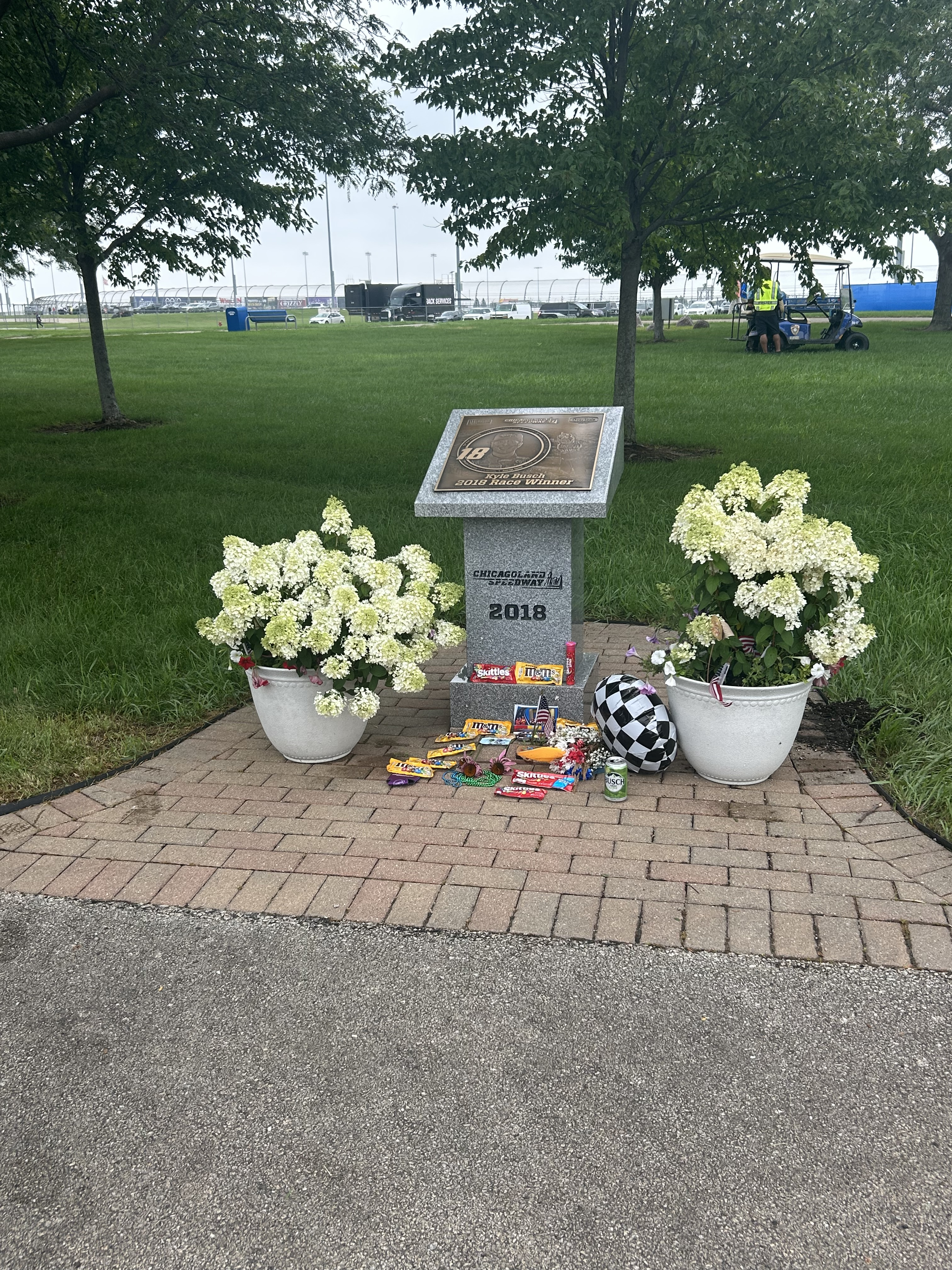
Kyle Busch's 2018 win monument in Champions Park in 2026, a few months after his death.

- 2018: For the first time since 2010, Chicagoland Speedway would hold a race in July. The race occurred on a very hot day. Paul Menard won the pole but the race would become notable for a fantastic finish between Kyle Busch and Kyle Larson. On the final lap in turn 1, Larson attempted to pass Busch and tried to use the slide job but instead ended up making contact with Busch and putting him in the wall. Larson took the lead on the backstretch but Busch sent the car in into turn 3 and got into Larson sending Larson sideways. Busch won the race over Larson as the crowd booed Busch when he came out of the car even with Busch making a baby face to the camera while he was getting booed.
- 2019: This race would be Chicagoland's last as the next event would be canceled due to the Pandemic. Austin Dillon won the pole for the race. The race only got 11 laps in before a thunderstorm moved into the area and the race was halted. The race was delayed for 3 hours and 12 minutes before the race resumed. Alex Bowman was searching for his first ever Cup Series win after he had finished 2nd for three races in a row at Talladega, Dover, and Kansas. But Bowman had to duel it out with Kyle Larson. With eight laps to go, Larson took the lead from Bowman but two laps later, Bowman took the lead back from Larson and Bowman won his first-ever NASCAR Cup Series win. During his celebration, Bowman ended up getting stuck in the grass that was softened by the rain but got out and celebrated with the fans and his crew.

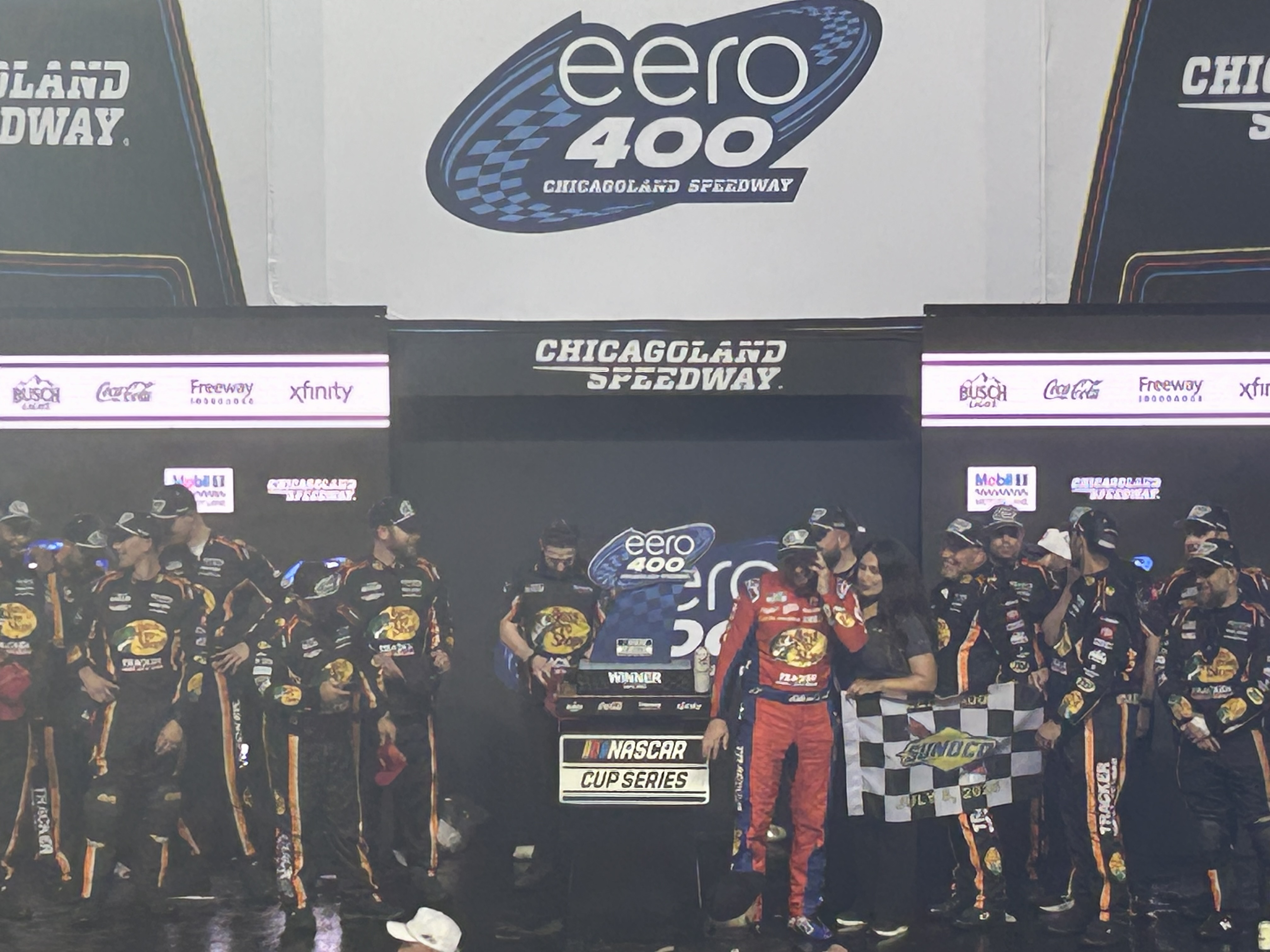
Chase Briscoe celebrating his 2026 eero 400 win.

- 2026: In the return race for Chicagoland to host a NASCAR event, Denny Hamlin won the pole by 0.001 seconds. William Byron swept the stages in dominate fashion. Chase Briscoe won the race after battling his teammate Christopher Bell.

Previous race: FireKeepers Casino 400	NASCAR Cup Series eero 400	Next race: Iowa Corn 350
