= 2006 USG Sheetrock 400 =

Race details
- Race 18 of 36 in the 2006 NASCAR Nextel Cup Series
- 2006 USG Sheetrock 400 program cover
- Date: July 9, 2006
- Location: Chicagoland Speedway, Joliet, Illinois
- Course: Permanent racing facility
- Course length: 1.500 miles (2.414 km)
- Distance: 270 laps, 405 mi (651.784 km)
- Scheduled distance: 267 laps, 400.5 mi (644.542 km)
- Weather: Hot with temperatures approaching 87.8 °F (31.0 °C); wind speeds up to 15 miles per hour (24 km/h)
- Average speed: 132.077 mph (212.557 km/h)
- Attendance: 80,000

Pole position
Driver	Jeff Burton	Richard Childress Racing
- Time: 29.728

Most laps led
Driver	Matt Kenseth	Roush Racing
- Laps: 112

Winner
No. 24	Jeff Gordon	Hendrick Motorsports

Television in the United States
- Network: TNT
- Announcers: Bill Weber, Benny Parsons, Wally Dallenbach Jr.
- Nielsen ratings: 5.2

The 2006 USG Sheetrock 400 was a NASCAR Nextel Cup Series race held on July 9, 2006, at Chicagoland Speedway in Joliet, Illinois. The race was the 18th of the 2006 NASCAR Nextel Cup Series season. Jeff Burton of Richard Childress Racing won the pole position with a lap speed of 181.647 mph (292.333 km/h), his second pole of 2006 along with the Daytona 500, marking the first time in his career that he won two poles in the same year. Roush Racing's Matt Kenseth led the most laps, while Jeff Gordon of Hendrick Motorsports won the race on a green–white–checkered finish, which extended the race from 267 laps to 270.

== Qualifying ==
St	No.	Driver	Make	Speed	Time	Behind
1	31	Jeff Burton	Chevrolet	181.647	29.728	0.000
2	25	Brian Vickers	Chevrolet	181.318	29.782	00.054
3	9	Kasey Kahne	Dodge	180.687	29.886	00.158
4	29	Kevin Harvick	Chevrolet	180.421	29.930	00.202
5	48	Jimmie Johnson	Chevrolet	180.391	29.935	00.207
6	43	Bobby Labonte	Dodge	180.367	29.939	00.211
7	11	Denny Hamlin	Chevrolet	179.874	30.021	00.293
8	17	Matt Kenseth	Ford	179.718	30.047	00.319
9	6	Mark Martin	Ford	179.324	30.113	00.385
10	18	JJ Yeley	Chevrolet	179.319	30.114	00.386
11	42	Casey Mears	Dodge	179.223	30.130	00.402
12	12	Ryan Newman	Dodge	179.206	30.133	00.405
13	24	Jeff Gordon	Chevrolet	179.200	30.134	00.406
14	10	Scott Riggs	Dodge	178.660	30.225	00.497
15	22	Dave Blaney	Dodge	178.636	30.229	00.501
16	19	Jeremy Mayfield	Dodge	178.613	30.233	00.505
17	01	Joe Nemechek	Chevrolet	178.583	30.238	00.510
18	41	Reed Sorenson	Dodge	178.442	30.262	00.534
19	2	Kurt Busch	Dodge	178.318	30.283	00.555
20	40	David Stremme	Dodge	178.283	30.289	00.561
21	99	Carl Edwards	Ford	178.271	30.291	00.563
22	66	Jeff Green	Chevrolet	178.159	30.310	00.582
23	5	Kyle Busch	Chevrolet	178.036	30.331	00.603
24	00	Bill Elliott	Chevrolet	178.001	30.337	00.609
25	8	Dale Earnhardt Jr	Chevrolet	177.924	30.350	00.622
26	44	Terry Labonte	Chevrolet	177.690	30.390	00.662
27	16	Greg Biffle	Ford	177.643	30.398	00.670
28	4	Scott Wimmer	Chevrolet	177.620	30.402	00.674
29	1	Martin Truex Jr	Chevrolet	177.515	30.420	00.692
30	7	Robby Gordon	Chevrolet	177.480	30.426	00.698
31	14	Sterling Marlin	Chevrolet	177.299	30.457	00.729
32	38	Elliott Sadler	Ford	177.067	30.497	00.769
33	45	Kyle Petty	Dodge	176.997	30.509	00.781
34	20	Tony Stewart	Chevrolet	176.933	30.520	00.792
35	06	Todd Kluever	Ford	176.580	30.581	00.853
36	55	Michael Waltrip	Dodge	176.551	30.586	00.858
37	78	Kenny Wallace	Chevrolet	176.505	30.594	00.866
38	07	Clint Bowyer	Chevrolet	176.471	30.600	00.872
39	96	Tony Raines	Chevrolet	175.936	30.693	00.965
40	21	Ken Schrader	Ford	175.673	30.739	01.011
41	88	Dale Jarrett	Ford	174.650	30.919	01.191
42	26	Jamie McMurray	Ford	174.227	30.994	01.266
43	32	Travis Kvapil	Chevrolet	176.177	30.651	00.923
Failed to qualify
44	15	Paul Menard	Chevrolet			
45	49	Kevin Lepage	Dodge			
46	61	Chad Blount	Dodge			
47	04	Brent Sherman	Ford			
48	51	Mike Garvey	Chevrolet			
49	74	Derrike Cope	Dodge			
50	34	Carl Long	Chevrolet			

== Race recap ==
Pole-sitter Jeff Burton led much of the early portion of the race, but Jeff Gordon then took the lead after a strong green-flag pit stop. On lap 68, the first caution flag was flown for debris on the track, shuffling the driver order and giving the lead to Kevin Harvick. With four laps to go, Gordon drove into a slowing Matt Kenseth's rear bumper, spinning him. On the green–white–checkered finish, Gordon led the final laps to win his 75th career Cup Series victory and second of 2006 with a 0.461 second lead over Burton, followed by Kyle Busch, Kevin Harvick, and defending race winner Dale Earnhardt Jr. Points leader Jimmie Johnson, Reed Sorenson, Kurt Busch, Clint Bowyer, and J. J. Yeley closed out the Top 10. Meanwhile, Kenseth was involved in a second wreck and ran out of fuel, but managed to finish the race on the lead lap and finished 22nd.

After the race, the points standings saw Johnson pull away from Kenseth, with the eight-point margin between them increasing to 51, with Johnson leading Kenseth 2,651 points to 2,600. Earnhardt Jr. was third with 2,394 points, Burton had 2,327 points, and Kasey Kahne rounded out the top five with 2,303. Mark Martin (2,291), Tony Stewart (2,274), Kyle Busch (2,265), Harvick (2,253) and Gordon (2,219) completed the top ten points standings.

== Results ==
Pos	St	No.	Driver	Car	Laps	Money	Status	Lead	Points
1	13	24	Jeff Gordon	Chevrolet	270	327761	running	20	185
2	1	31	Jeff Burton	Chevrolet	270	250220	running	60	175
3	23	5	Kyle Busch	Chevrolet	270	178075	running	2	170
4	4	29	Kevin Harvick	Chevrolet	270	184586	running	40	165
5	25	8	Dale Earnhardt Jr.	Chevrolet	270	164591	running	27	160
6	5	48	Jimmie Johnson	Chevrolet	270	154286	running	0	150
7	18	41	Reed Sorenson	Dodge	270	116525	running	6	151
8	19	2	Kurt Busch	Dodge	270	138958	running	0	142
9	38	07	Clint Bowyer	Chevrolet	270	114425	running	0	138
10	10	18	J. J. Yeley	Chevrolet	270	138475	running	0	134
11	27	16	Greg Biffle	Ford	270	113000	running	0	130
12	6	43	Bobby Labonte	Dodge	270	132136	running	1	132
13	2	25	Brian Vickers	Chevrolet	270	101350	running	0	124
14	7	11	Denny Hamlin	Chevrolet	270	91525	running	0	121
15	14	10	Scott Riggs	Dodge	270	91325	running	0	118
16	29	1	Martin Truex Jr.	Chevrolet	270	116283	running	0	115
17	15	22	Dave Blaney	Dodge	270	106233	running	0	112
18	9	6	Mark Martin	Ford	270	103325	running	1	114
19	30	7	Robby Gordon	Chevrolet	270	88125	running	0	106
20	21	99	Carl Edwards	Ford	270	106725	running	0	103
21	20	40	David Stremme	Dodge	270	108983	running	0	100
22	8	17	Matt Kenseth	Ford	270	139666	running	112	107
23	3	9	Kasey Kahne	Dodge	270	120489	running	0	94
24	16	19	Jeremy Mayfield	Dodge	270	114916	running	0	91
25	11	42	Casey Mears	Dodge	270	118783	running	0	88
26	31	14	Sterling Marlin	Chevrolet	269	95158	running	0	85
27	22	66	Jeff Green	Chevrolet	269	100447	running	0	82
28	33	45	Kyle Petty	Dodge	269	89800	running	0	79
29	32	38	Elliott Sadler	Ford	269	107008	running	0	76
30	36	55	Michael Waltrip	Dodge	269	79350	running	0	73
31	41	88	Dale Jarrett	Ford	269	110725	running	0	70
32	34	20	Tony Stewart	Chevrolet	269	132386	running	1	72
33	17	01	Joe Nemechek	Chevrolet	268	105545	running	0	64
34	28	4	Scott Wimmer	Chevrolet	268	78050	running	0	61
35	24	00	Bill Elliott	Chevrolet	268	77850	running	0	58
36	12	12	Ryan Newman	Dodge	268	123058	running	0	55
37	43	32	Travis Kvapil	Chevrolet	268	77425	running	0	52
38	37	78	Kenny Wallace	Chevrolet	268	77225	running	0	49
39	42	26	Jamie McMurray	Ford	268	123850	running	0	46
40	39	96	Tony Raines	Chevrolet	267	76805	running	0	43
41	35	06	Todd Kluever	Ford	267	76605	running	0	40
42	40	21	Ken Schrader	Ford	266	103644	running	0	37
43	26	44	Terry Labonte	Chevrolet	167	76551	engine	0	34

== Standings after the race ==
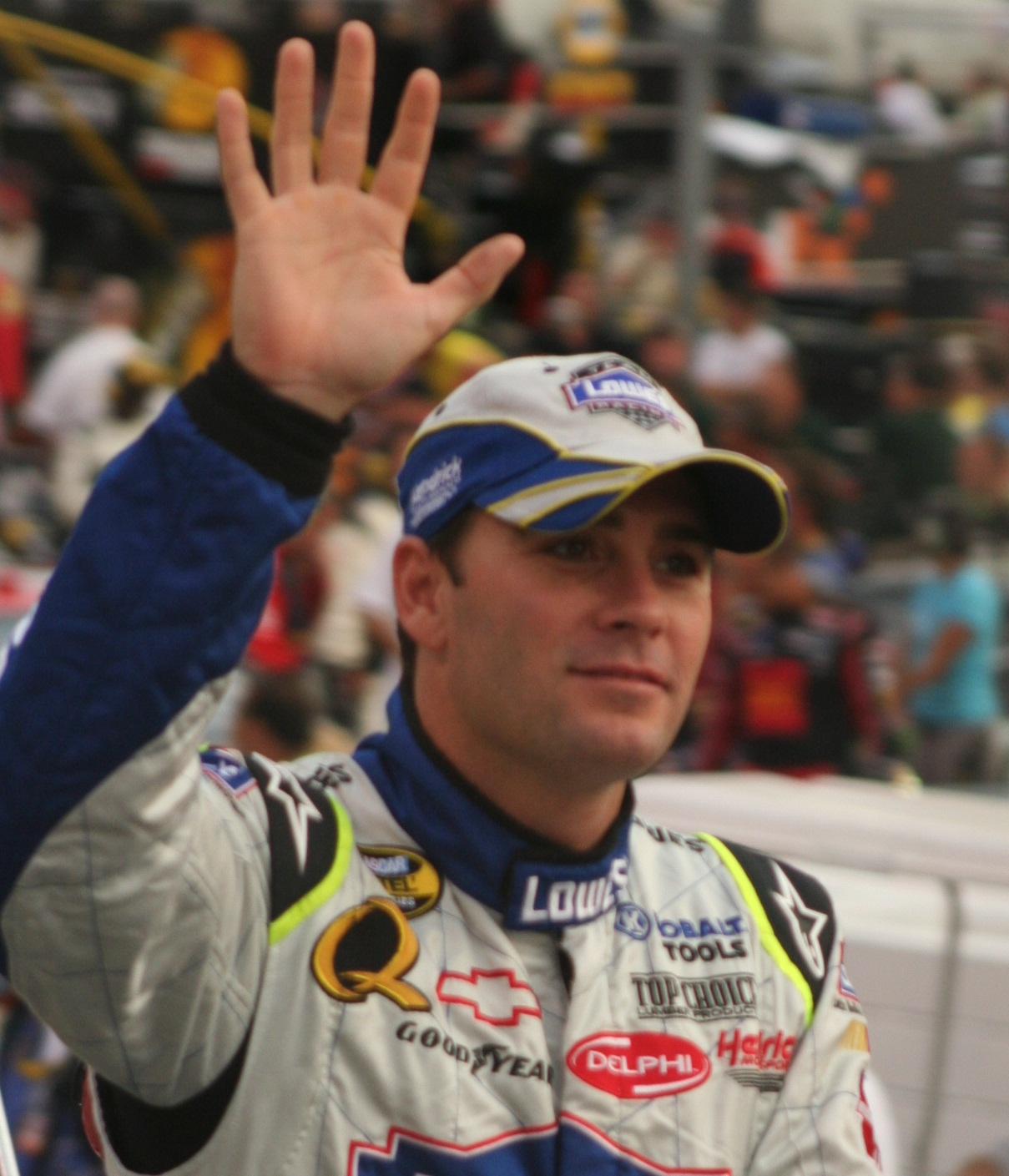
Jimmie Johnson led the points standings after the race.

Pos	Driver	Points
1	Jimmie Johnson	2651
2	Matt Kenseth	2600
3	Dale Earnhardt Jr.	2394
4	Jeff Burton	2327
5	Kasey Kahne	2303
6	Mark Martin	2291
7	Tony Stewart	2274
8	Kyle Busch	2265
9	Kevin Harvick	2253
10	Jeff Gordon	2219

Previous race: 2006 Pepsi 400	Nextel Cup Series; 2006 season	Next race: 2006 Lenox Industrial Tools 300
