= David Ragan =

American racing driver (born 1985)

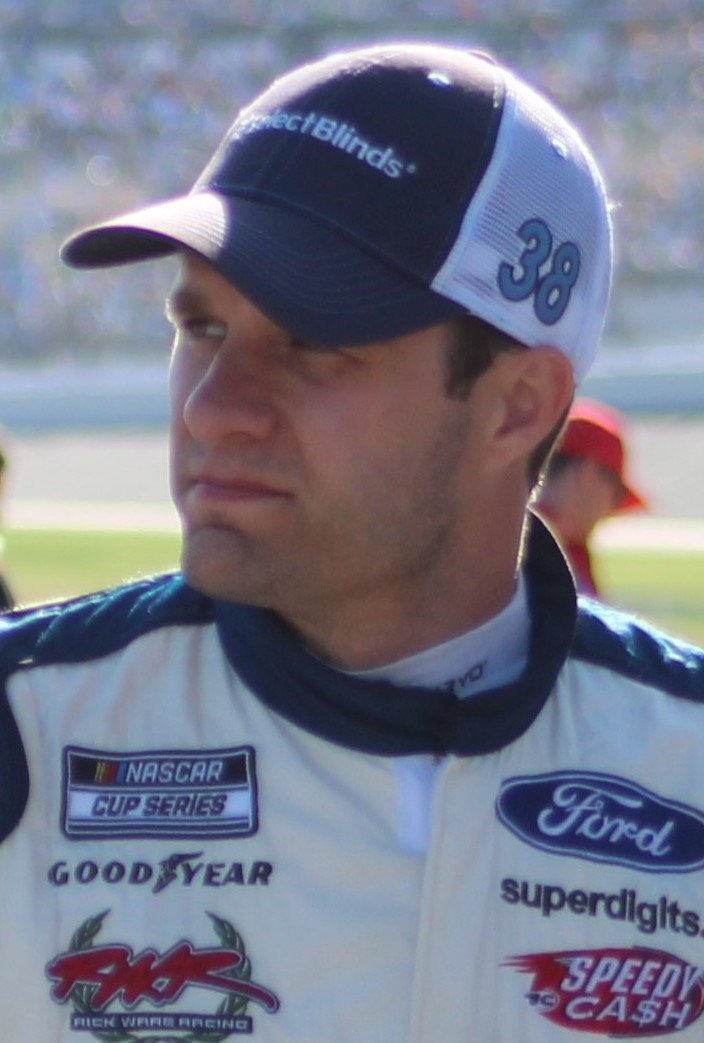
- Ragan at Daytona International Speedway in 2020
- Born: David Lee Ragan; December 24, 1985 (age 40); Unadilla, Georgia, U.S.
- Awards: 2007 NASCAR Busch Series Rookie of the Year

NASCAR Cup Series career
- 477 races run over 18 years
- 2024 position: 40th
- Best finish: 13th (2008)
- First race: 2006 Dover 400 (Dover)
- Last race: 2024 Daytona 500 (Daytona)
- First win: 2011 Coke Zero 400 (Daytona)
- Last win: 2013 Aaron's 499 (Talladega)
| Wins | Top tens | Poles |
|---|---|---|
| 2 | 43 | 2 |

NASCAR O'Reilly Auto Parts Series career
- 107 races run over 11 years
- 2016 position: 115th
- Best finish: 4th (2008)
- First race: 2004 Ford 300 (Homestead)
- Last race: 2016 Subway Firecracker 250 (Daytona)
- First win: 2009 Aaron's 312 (Talladega)
- Last win: 2009 Food City 250 (Bristol)
| Wins | Top tens | Poles |
|---|---|---|
| 2 | 49 | 3 |

NASCAR FedEx Freight Truck Series career
- 31 races run over 4 years
- 2020 position: 48th
- Best finish: 24th (2006)
- First race: 2004 O'Reilly 400K (Texas)
- Last race: 2020 ToyotaCare 250 (Richmond)
| Wins | Top tens | Poles |
|---|---|---|
| 0 | 9 | 1 |

ARCA Menards Series career
- 31 races run over 5 years
- Best finish: 14th (2005)
- First race: 2003 ARCA Re/Max 200 (Lake Erie)
- Last race: 2008 Hantz Group 200 by Belle Tire & Federated Car Care (Toledo)
- First win: 2005 Williams Bros. 200 (Lanier)
| Wins | Top tens | Poles |
|---|---|---|
| 1 | 14 | 3 |
- Statistics up to date as of November 4, 2024.

David Lee Ragan (born December 24, 1985) is an American professional stock car racing driver. He last competed part-time in the NASCAR Cup Series, driving the No. 60 Ford Mustang Dark Horse for RFK Racing, and was also an analyst for NASCAR on Fox on NASCAR Race Hub.

Ragan was born in Unadilla, Georgia, the son of former racer Ken Ragan, and began his racing career racing in the Bandolero Series at age 12. Four years later, he began competing in the Goody's Dash Series with Cam Strader. After one year, he moved to the Legends Pro-Division to race for Mark Martin. He finished the season by finishing fourth in the point standings. At age 18, Ragan began racing in the Camping World Truck Series, the Nationwide Series, and the ARCA Racing Series.

In 2007, Ragan moved up to the Sprint Cup Series, replacing Mark Martin in the No. 6, and driving for Roush Fenway Racing. Between 2007 and 2011, he recorded 30 top tens in the series. On July 2, 2011, Ragan won his first career Sprint Cup Series race, the Coke Zero 400 at Daytona International Speedway. His second win, the Aaron's 499 at Talladega Superspeedway in May 2013, was also the first win for Front Row Motorsports.

== Racing career ==
=== 1996–2002 ===
Ragan was born in Unadilla, Georgia in December 1985, the son of former racer Ken Ragan. Ragan started his racing career in the Bandolero Series at the age of twelve. During the following year, he won twelve races and the National Championship. In 1999, he won the National Championship for the second time. In 2001, Ragan began racing in the Goody's Dash Series with Cam Strader. During the season, the two built late models for Ragan to use in 2002. In 2002, he began racing in the Legends Pro-Division for Mark Martin. At the end of the season, he finished fourth in the final point standings.

=== 2003–2006 ===
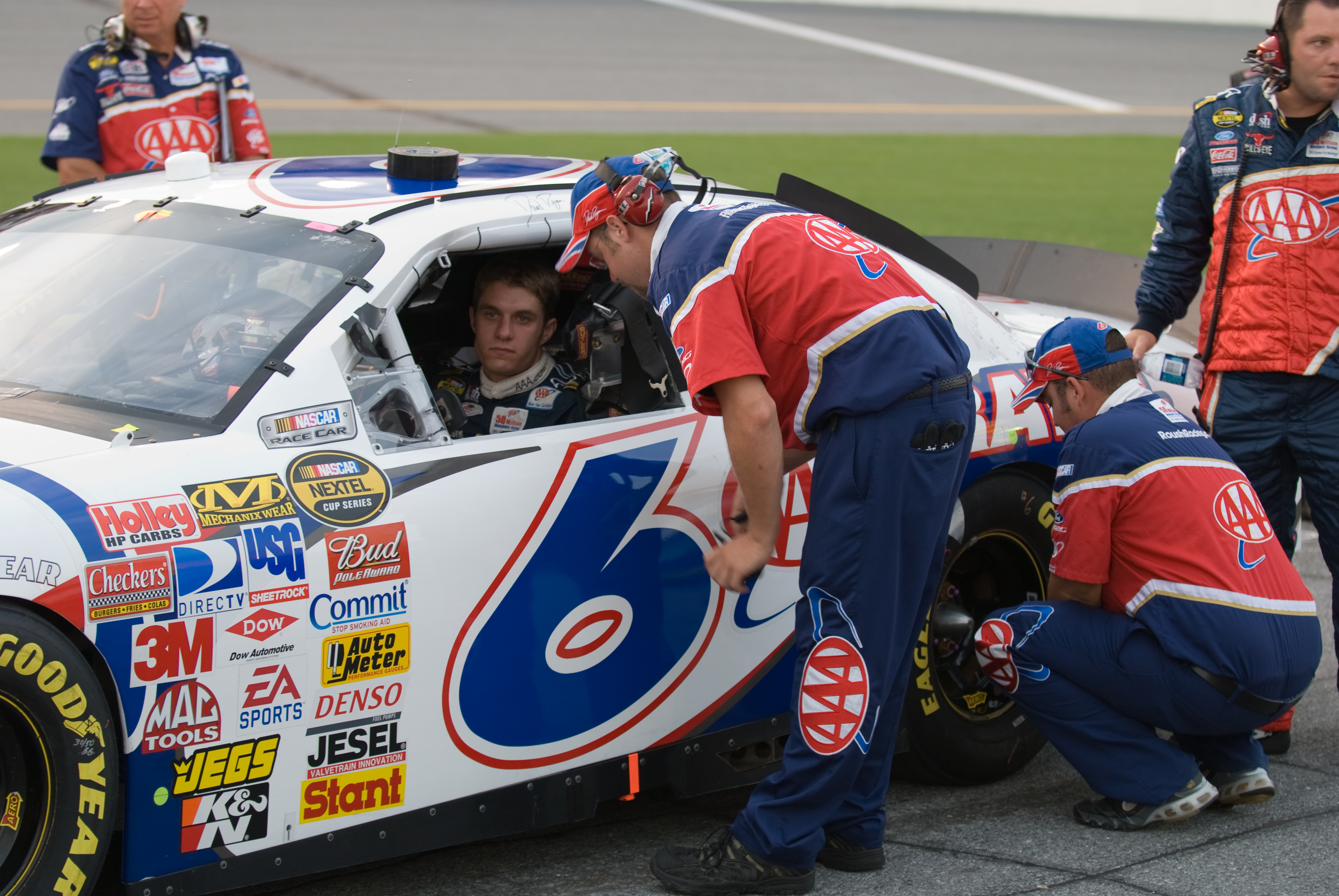
Ragan's No. 6 in 2007

At the age of eighteen, Ragan moved to the Craftsman Truck Series, as well as the Busch Series and the ARCA Re/Max Series. During his first career start in the ARCA Series, he qualified in the second position, but failed to finish the race after suffering a tire failure. His first race in the Craftsman Truck Series was at Texas Motor Speedway, where he qualified 28th and finished in the twentieth position for Fiddleback Racing. During the season, he failed to qualify for one race, and failed to finish six of the ten races he participated in. Ragan also ran one Busch Series race at Homestead, finishing 31st, after starting 36th. In the following season, he participated in Roush Racing: Driver X as the co-driver of the No. 6 Roush Racing Ford F-150 in the Truck Series. After participating in nineteen events in the series, he recorded one top-five, eight top-ten finishes, and one pole position.

Also in 2005, Ragan participated in three Busch Series events, as well as 19 ARCA Racing Series events, where he won one race, and recorded three pole positions, eight top-five finishes, and eleven top-ten finishes. During the 2006 season, he participated in three Busch Series events, and two Nextel Cup Series events. He also participated in nineteen Truck Series events, where he recorded two pole positions, one top-five, and eight top-ten finishes.

=== 2007–2011 ===
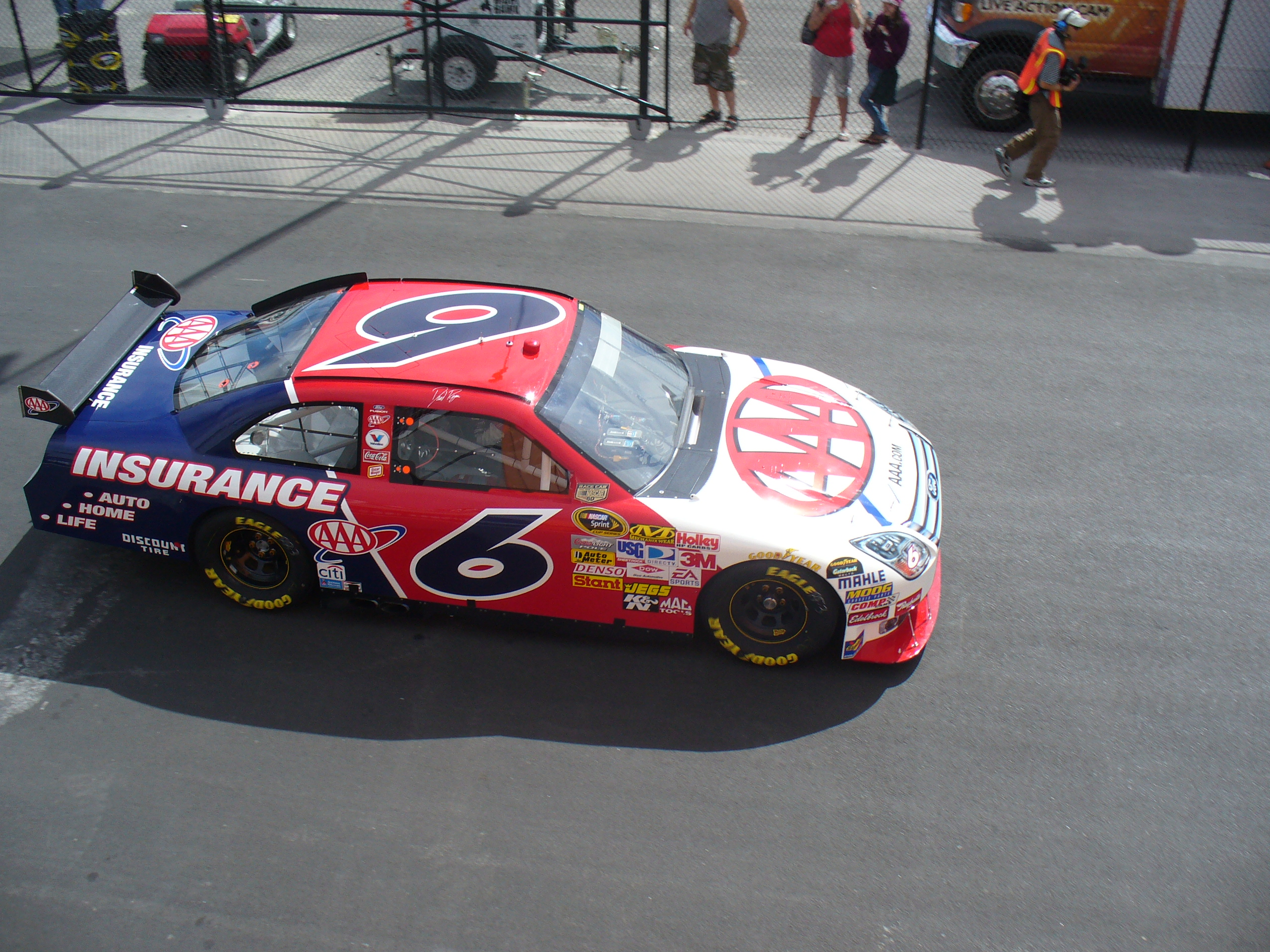
Ragan at Las Vegas Motor Speedway in 2008

For the 2007 season, Ragan moved to the Nextel Cup Series as the driver of the number 6 Roush Fenway Racing Ford Fusion. He also participated in the NASCAR Rookie of the Year standings in both the Nextel Cup and Busch Series, where he finished second in the Nextel Cup Series, while winning the award in the Busch Series. During the Cup season, Ragan recorded two top-five finishes, one being in the 2007 Daytona 500, and three top-tens, finishing 23rd in the point standings. During the Busch Series season, he earned two pole positions, four top-fives, and nine top-tens, while finishing fifth in the final point standings. Also in 2007, he participated in one ARCA Racing Series event, where he finished in the fourth position.

In 2008, Ragan raced in the Sprint Cup Series, the Nationwide Series, and in two ARCA Racing Series events. In the Cup season, he earned six top-fives and 14 top-tens, while finishing thirteenth in points. During the Nationwide season, he got seven top-fives and 21 top-ten finishes. Ragan clinched fourth in the final point standings. One year later, in 2009, he participated in only the Cup Series and the Nationwide Series. During the 2009 NASCAR Sprint Cup Series season, he recorded zero top-fives and two top-tens and finished 27th in points. However, in the 2009 NASCAR Nationwide Series season, he won two races and earned five top-fives and fifteen top-tens, while finishing eighteenth in points.

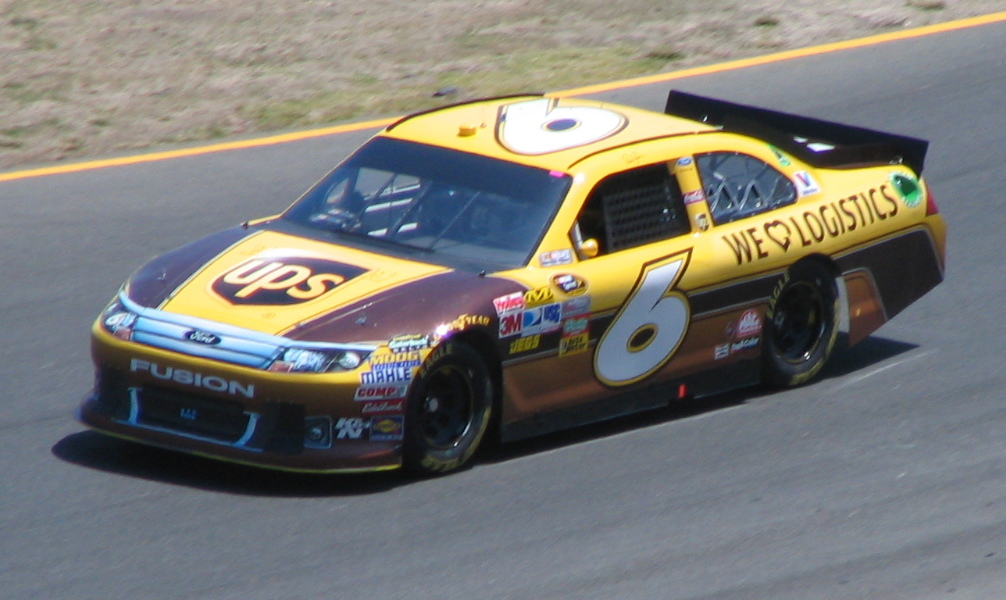
Ragan racing during the 2011 Toyota/Save Mart 350

During 2010, he only participated in the Sprint Cup Series. He recorded zero top-fives, only three top-ten finishes, and finished 24th in points once the season concluded. In 2011, he began the year almost winning the Daytona 500, but he got penalized for moving lanes before he crossed the line on the restart with two laps to go. On May 21, 2011, he won the Sprint Showdown at Charlotte Motor Speedway, passing Brad Keselowski with two laps to go.

Ragan won the Coke Zero 400 on July 2, 2011, for his first career Sprint Cup win after getting a late push from teammate Matt Kenseth. He was eligible to compete in the "wild card" to get himself into the Chase for the Sprint Cup. After bad finishes a few weeks before the final race before the Chase at Richmond, he finished fourth but was 54 points away from thirteenth to put himself into a Chase position. At the end of the 2011 season UPS, Ragan's primary sponsor on the Roush Fenway Racing No. 6 Ford, announced that they would no longer sponsor the No. 6 and that the company would scale back its racing program next season, leaving the number 6 team without sponsorship and ultimately forced the camp to shut down, making Roush Fenway Racing a 3-car team for the 2012 season.

=== 2012–2014 ===
Ragan at the 2013 Sprint All-Star Race.

In January 2012, Ragan signed with Front Row Motorsports to drive the No. 34 Ford for the team in 2012. He drove for GC Motorsports International in the season-opening Nationwide Series event at Daytona. Ragan got off to a bad start with FRM, crashing out on lap two of the Daytona 500 and finishing last. He would eventually go on to finish 28th in Cup Series points.

Ragan started the 2013 season with a rotating roster of sponsors. He started the season wrecked at the Daytona 500 (along with his two other teammates, David Gilliland and Josh Wise) and had no finish better than twentieth in the first nine races. However, during the Aaron's 499, Ragan started the green–white–checker restart in 10th-place. On the last lap, teammate Gilliland was able to help push him past Jimmie Johnson, Matt Kenseth, and Carl Edwards to win the race. This was his first win with Front Row Motorsports and the team's first Sprint Cup win, as well as the first NASCAR win for his sponsor for that race, Farm Rich. The 34 team improved more in 2013, earning sixteen top-25 finishes, including the win, a twelfth-place finish at the Irwin Tools Night Race at Bristol Motor Speedway, and a sixth-place finish at the fall Talladega race. However, three consecutive engine failures during the Chase dropped Ragan to 28th in points.

For 2014, Ragan returned to Front Row Motorsports No. 34 to run the full season with sponsorship from Farm Rich and CSX. In the Nationwide Series, Ragan joined Biagi-DenBeste Racing in the No. 98 Ford for several races throughout the season. Ragan got his first top-ten finish on a non-restrictor plate track with Front Row Motorsports in the 2014 Goody's Headache Relief Shot 500 at Martinsville Speedway by gambling on track position with five laps to go in the race. It was his first top-ten of the season and came with a paint scheme paying tribute to the late Wendell Scott, who had also driven the number 34. Ragan finished 32nd in points.

=== 2015 ===
Ragan returned to Front Row Motorsports in 2015. Ragan's owner points were given to new teammate Cole Whitt, but Ragan raced his way into the Daytona 500, finishing seventeenth in the race.

==== Joe Gibbs Racing ====
After the 500, Ragan was tapped by Joe Gibbs Racing to take over the No. 18 Toyota for several races while Kyle Busch was out with leg injuries.

At Atlanta, Ragan nursed the No. 18 to an eighteenth-place finish. This was followed by a 22nd place finish at Las Vegas and a 21st place finish at Phoenix. At Auto Club, he made moves on several late restarts to take a fifteenth-place finish. At Martinsville, Ragan took the best finish of his stint with JGR with a fifth-place run. This was followed by a 13th-place finish at Texas.

At Bristol, Ragan started in eleventh place. However, he was caught up in a crash on lap 312 and finished 41st, 76 laps down. At Richmond, he started 10th and finished 23rd, two laps off the lead lap.

At Talladega, Ragan started in ninth place. However, he sustained severe damage in the Big One on lap 47 and finished 38th, 65 laps down.

The nine races in which Ragan participated entitled him to a one-fourth share (nine races) of Sprint Cup championship team bonuses, as the No. 18 team won the 2015 championship, worth $1,197,075 for his championship efforts.

With Erik Jones replacing Kyle Busch for the July Xfinity race at Daytona, Ragan drove the No. 20 Interstate Batteries Toyota and was running well until he was caught in an accident late in the race.

==== Michael Waltrip Racing ====
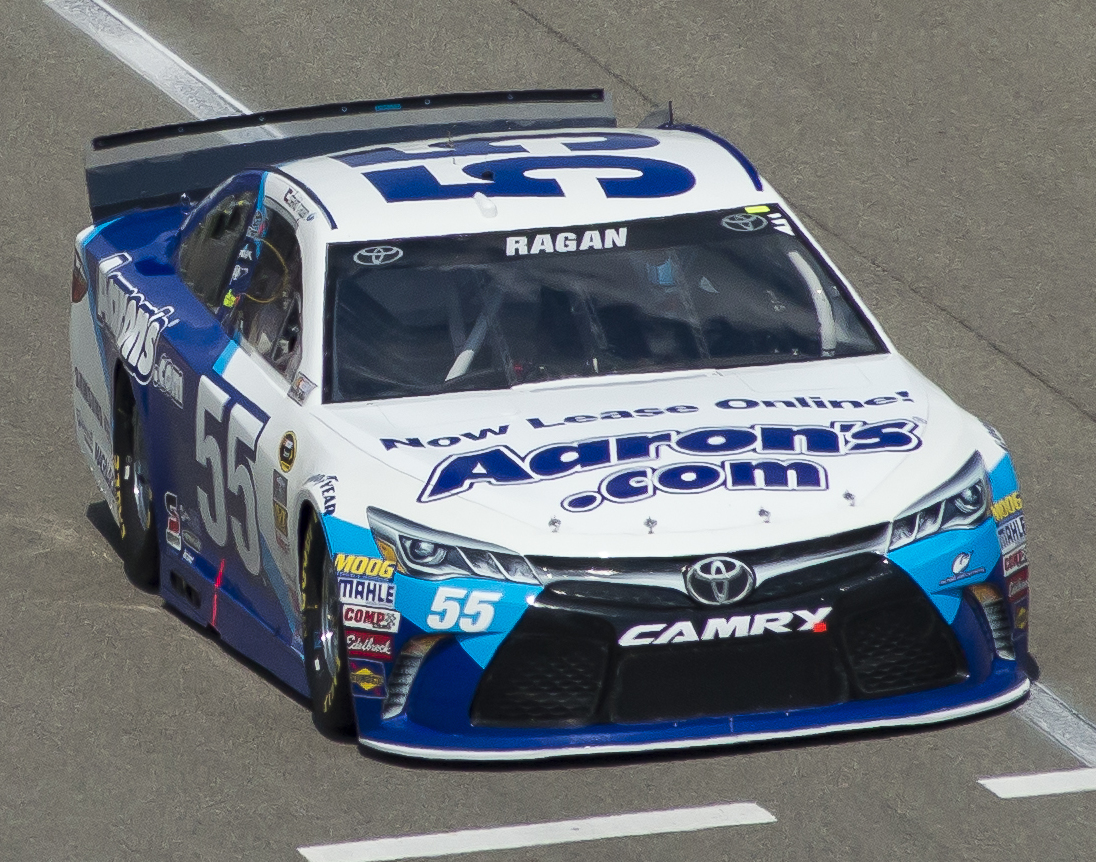
Ragan's No. 55 at Michigan International Speedway in 2015

Ragan was originally scheduled to return to Front Row after his stint at JGR was over. However, it was announced on April 28 that beginning at Kansas, the No. 18 would be handed to rookie Erik Jones until Busch's return, while Ragan would move to Michael Waltrip Racing and drive their No. 55 car for the remainder of the season, beginning at Kansas.

At Kansas, Ragan was involved in a two-car accident on lap 121 with Josh Wise and finished 33rd, four laps down. At the Coca-Cola 600, he started seventh and was running well until his engine blew up with 47 laps to go, leaving him with a 41st-place finish.

At Dover, he started fifteenth and finished thirteenth. At Pocono, Ragan started 21st and finished 23rd. At Michigan, Ragan fell off the lead lap and was scored 35th when the race was called for rain.

At Sonoma, Ragan started in ninth. He'd be involved in two wrecks during the day. On lap thirty, when coming out of turn seven, Martin Truex Jr. forced him into the grass. When Ragan's car got back onto the racing surface, he clipped Truex from behind, sending Truex into the tire barriers. Later, following a restart on lap 79, Ragan was racing alongside Carl Edwards for position when, coming through the esses in the same spot as Truex's crash, Edwards' car bounced over the outside curb, sending him into Ragan, and sending both cars into the jersey barriers on the inside of the track. Ragan finished 39th.

Returning to Daytona for the Coke Zero 400, Ragan started eighth. He was involved in a single-car spin on the back straightaway on lap 149 after contact with Landon Cassill, but was able to recover and finish twelfth. At Kentucky, he started 25th and finished eighteenth. This was followed by a 21st place finish at Indianapolis, a seventeenth place finish at Pocono, and a 23rd place finish at Watkins Glen. After the race at Homestead, in which Ragan finished 27th, MWR closed its doors, leaving Ragan without a ride.

=== 2016 ===
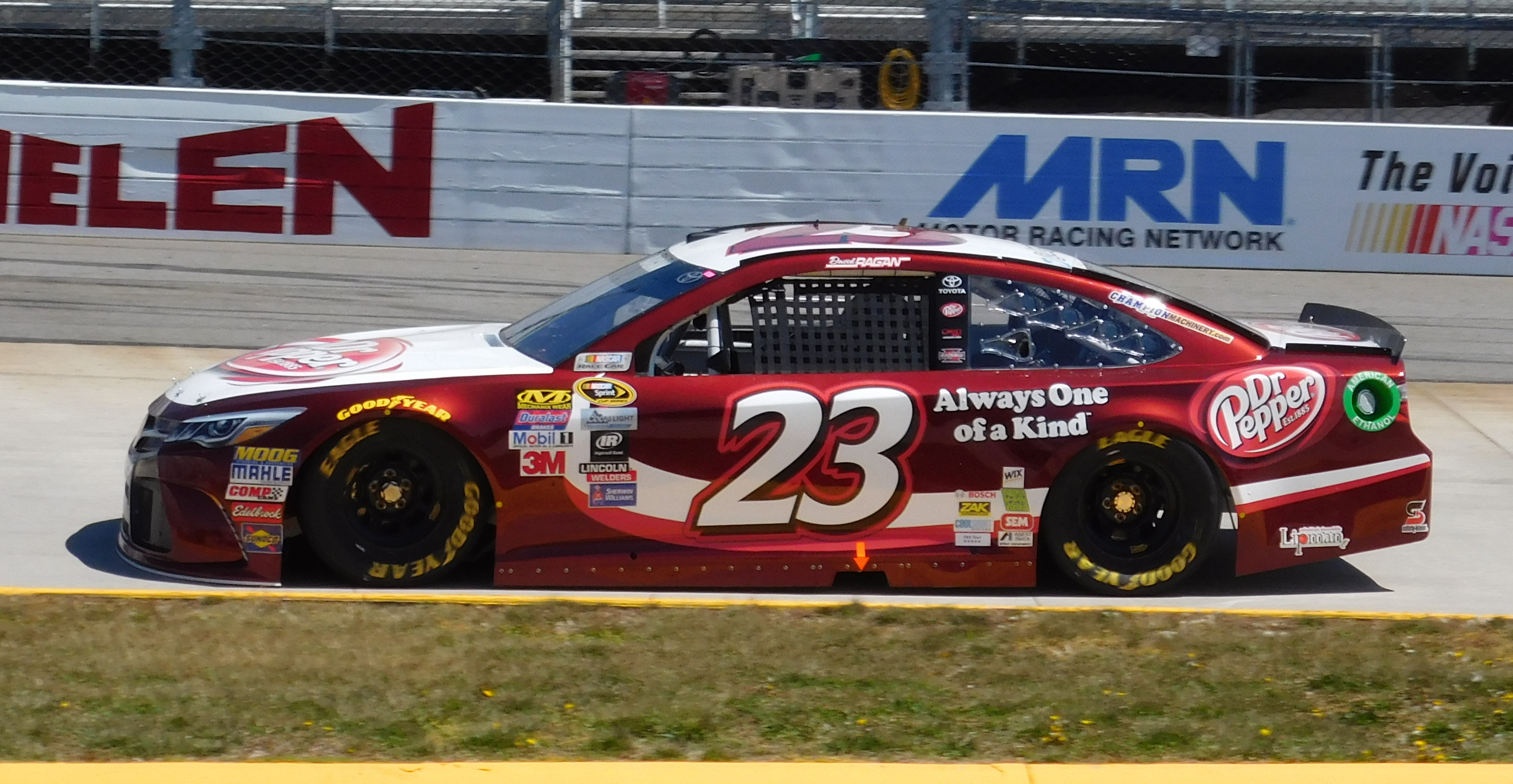
Ragan's No. 23 at Martinsville Speedway in 2016

On January 19, 2016, it was announced that Ragan would drive the No. 23 Dr. Pepper Toyota Camry for BK Racing. The No. 23 team struggled mightily, as the team's engines did not have enough speed to be competitive every week. Ragan's best result with the BK team in 2016 was a sixteenth-place finish at the Coke Zero 400. During late summer, Ragan was thrown into the spotlight after Chris Buescher, driving Ragan's old No. 34 at FRM, won at Pocono while trailing Ragan for 30th in points. The battle between Buescher and Ragan for the thirty-first (and therefore Chase eligibility for Buescher) became a focal point of the lead-up to the Chase. Buescher ended up qualifying for the Chase, while Ragan dropped several spots to finish 33rd overall in Sprint Cup points, a career-worst, marking his first season without at least one top-ten finish. Ragan parted ways with BK Racing after the season.

For the second year in a row, Ragan drove in relief for Joe Gibbs Racing in the July Xfinity race at Daytona, driving the No. 18 Toyota, replacing Matt Tifft, out on medical leave. Ragan sat on the pole, but crashed on the last lap, and finished 21st.

=== 2017 ===
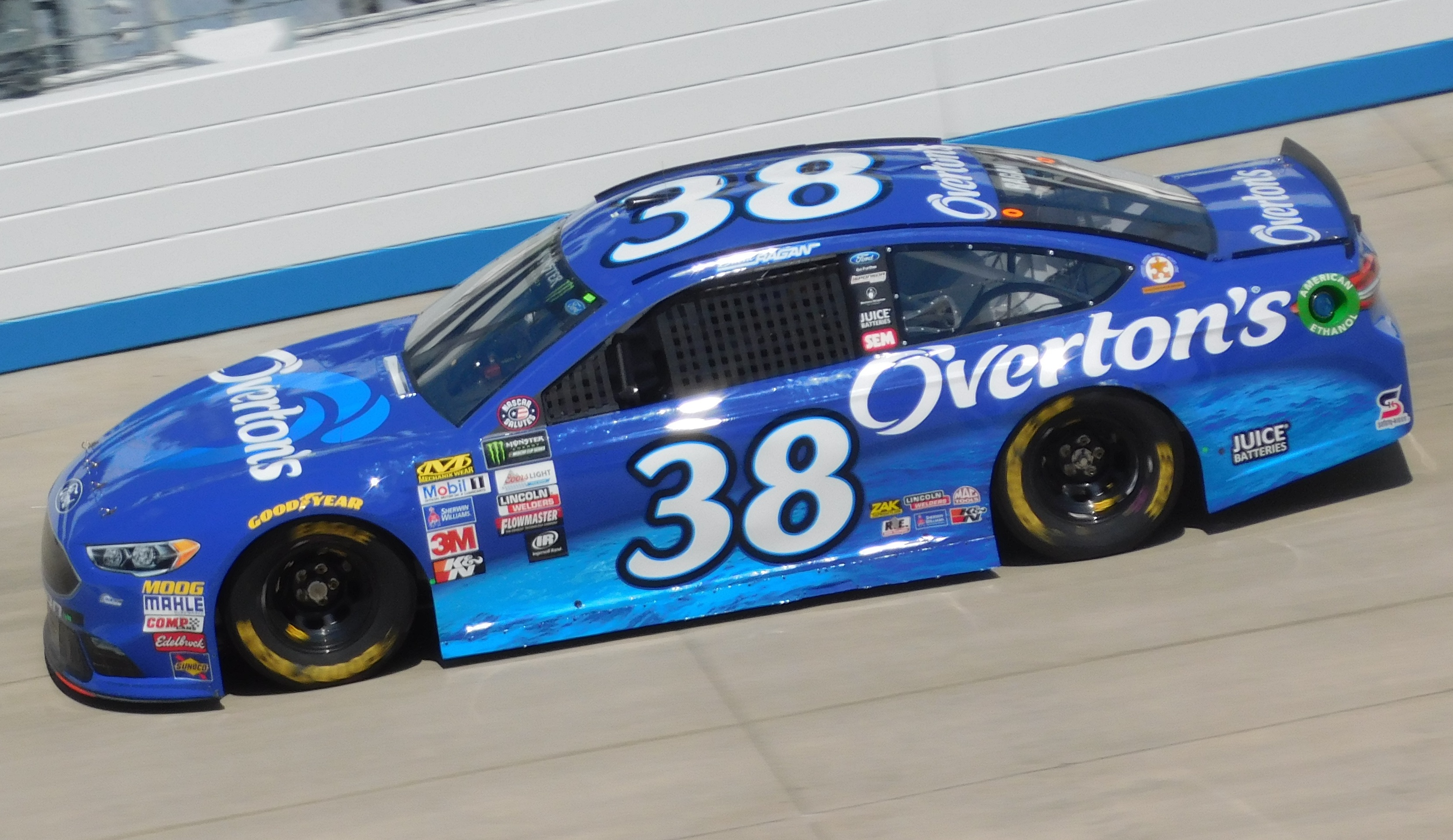
Ragan's No. 38 at Dover International Speedway in 2017

After departing BK Racing following his worst career points finish, Ragan returned to Front Row Motorsports, where he drove from 2012 to 2015, to drive the No. 38. His first race back at FRM resulted in a 25th-place finish in the Daytona 500 after he was involved in a crash while running in the top five. His first top-ten in over a year came at the GEICO 500 at Talladega, where he finished tenth after avoiding the Big One late in the race and making daring four-wide passes on Denny Hamlin, Kyle Larson, Ty Dillon, Clint Bowyer, and Chris Buescher all on the final lap. This result boosted him up five spots in the point standings to 28th.

Ragan continued his string of good momentum with a 17th-place finish at the spring race at Kansas, his third consecutive top-twenty finish, boosting him to 27th in the point standings. While his top-twenty streak ended at Charlotte Motor Speedway, where he finished 23rd, it allowed him to maintain 27th in the standings. His momentum abruptly ended at Dover, where a late crash with five laps to go relegated him to a thirtieth-place finish and sent him back to 29th in the overall standings. Ragan was up front with a handful of laps to go at Daytona in July in a position to score his third career win. He led the race with two laps to go, ultimately getting passed by Ricky Stenhouse Jr., who ended up winning the race. Ragan was the only driver to score both stage points in both stages and left Daytona with a top-ten finish, where he finished 6th.

After a few subpar mid-twenties finishes, Ragan bounced back with a seventeenth-place finish in the Bass Pro Shops NRA Night Race after running as high as twelfth in the race. Ragan was headed for another top-twenty finish in the Bojangles' Southern 500, running as high as fifteenth early in the race, but fell to 25th after a spin and two cut tires. Ragan received quite some attention at Dover in the fall, benefiting from an early caution to race his way into the top-five, then went on to finish ninth in Stage 1 for his first stage points since Daytona in July. Ragan remained on the lead lap for much of the event and finished the race in the 21st position.

Upon the series' return to Talladega in October, Ragan moved from his 33rd starting position to the front early. Despite involvement in several crashes throughout the evening, Ragan posted his third top-ten of the season, matching his Talladega result in the spring. Ragan ended the 2017 season with a seventeenth-place finish at Homestead and a thirtieth-place finish in the point standings.

=== 2018 ===
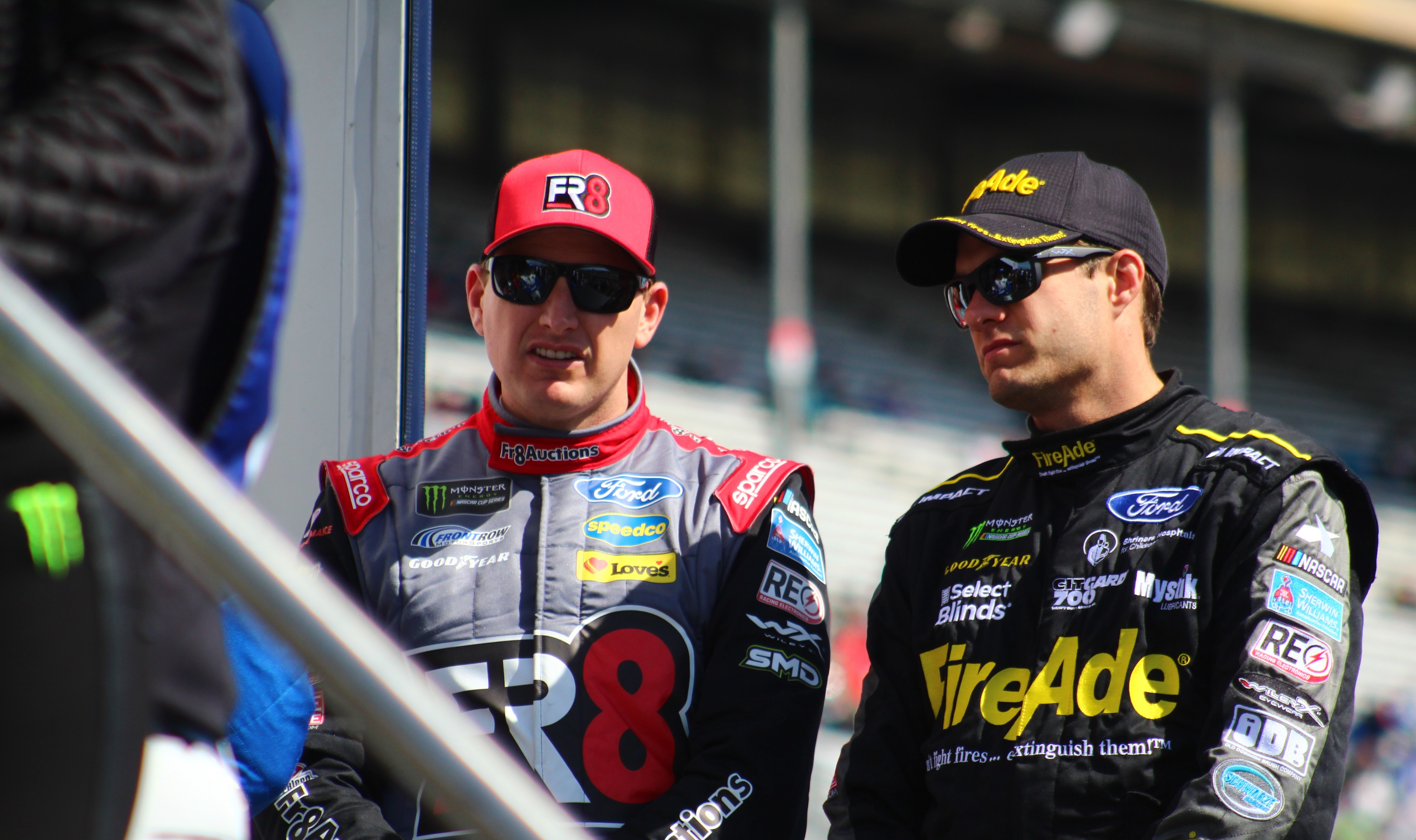
Ragan and Michael McDowell (left), his teammate at FRM in 2018 and 2019, at Atlanta in 2019

On December 14, 2017, it was announced that Ragan would return to the team in 2018, with a new teammate Michael McDowell who previously was also a teammate in Watkins Glen 2013 when he drove the No. 34 and McDowell drove the No. 35 car.

After a crash in the Daytona 500, Ragan rattled off three consecutive top-25 finishes at Atlanta, Las Vegas, and Phoenix, the latter of which gave him his best start and finish to date, qualifying sixteenth and finishing 22nd. Ragan had a series of six consecutive top-25 finishes from Atlanta to Texas. The Bristol weekend was a big success for Ragan so far in 2018, where he was fastest in final practice and finished on the lead lap in twelfth place. Ragan was on pace to have another top-fifteen run at Richmond until a flat tire in the final ten laps sidelined him to a 33rd-place finish.

As always happens whenever the series visits Talladega Superspeedway, Ragan and his FRM team were expected to be contenders. He posted his best qualifying effort of the season by starting twelfth, then overcame an early speeding penalty to finish sixth, his first top-ten of the season. Two more top-twenties followed at Kansas and Pocono before his momentum was halted by an early race crash at Michigan, precipitated by Bubba Wallace. After a career-best 22nd-place finish at Sonoma Raceway, Ragan suffered numerous mechanical issues in the race at Chicagoland Speedway and struggled to a 38th-place finish, nearly eighty laps off the pace.

When the series returned to Daytona International Speedway in July, Ragan was immediately picked by many to be a dark horse for the win. However, a crash early in the race dashed Ragan's hopes for victory. His team still did an incredible job repairing the No. 38, and Ragan finished the event in fifteenth position. Ragan rebounded with a solid eighteenth-place run at Kentucky Speedway after driving up to as high as twelfth in the race and later getting a nineteenth-place finish at Pocono Raceway, a seventeenth-place finish at Bristol Motor Speedway, and an eighteenth-place finish at Darlington Raceway. After a couple of mediocre finishes, Ragan finished sixteenth at Charlotte Motor Speedway, nineteenth at Kansas Speedway, and eighteenth at Martinsville Speedway, rebuilding momentum for the end of the season.

After two consecutive twentieth-place finishes at ISM Raceway and Homestead, Ragan finished 25th in the overall 2018 standings, ranking 31 points ahead of teammate Michael McDowell in 26th and 42 points ahead of Ty Dillon in 27th. This is Ragan's best finish with FRM and his best overall since 2011, his last year with Roush Fenway Racing.

=== 2019: Final full-time season ===
On November 27, 2018, it was announced that Ragan would return for a sixth season with FRM to drive the No. 38 in 2019. A strong run at the 2019 Daytona 500 for the No. 38 team was ruined by a late-race accident that relegated them to a thirtieth-place finish, but the team rebounded the next weekend at Atlanta with a sixteenth-place finish. The Las Vegas weekend gave Ragan his best starting spot in several years, as the No. 38 lined up on the outside of the third row in sixth after a stellar qualifying performance. At the 2019 Coca-Cola 600 at Charlotte, Ragan and the No. 38 team enjoyed their best race in quite some time, running in the top-ten all race and leading in the late stages before fading to fifteenth at the finish after a late-race restart.

On August 14, 2019, Ragan announced that he would be retiring from full-time competition to focus on his family. At Kansas, Ragan qualified second, his team's best qualifying effort on a non-restrictor plate track, behind pole-sitter Daniel Hemric.

=== 2020–present: Part-time racing ===
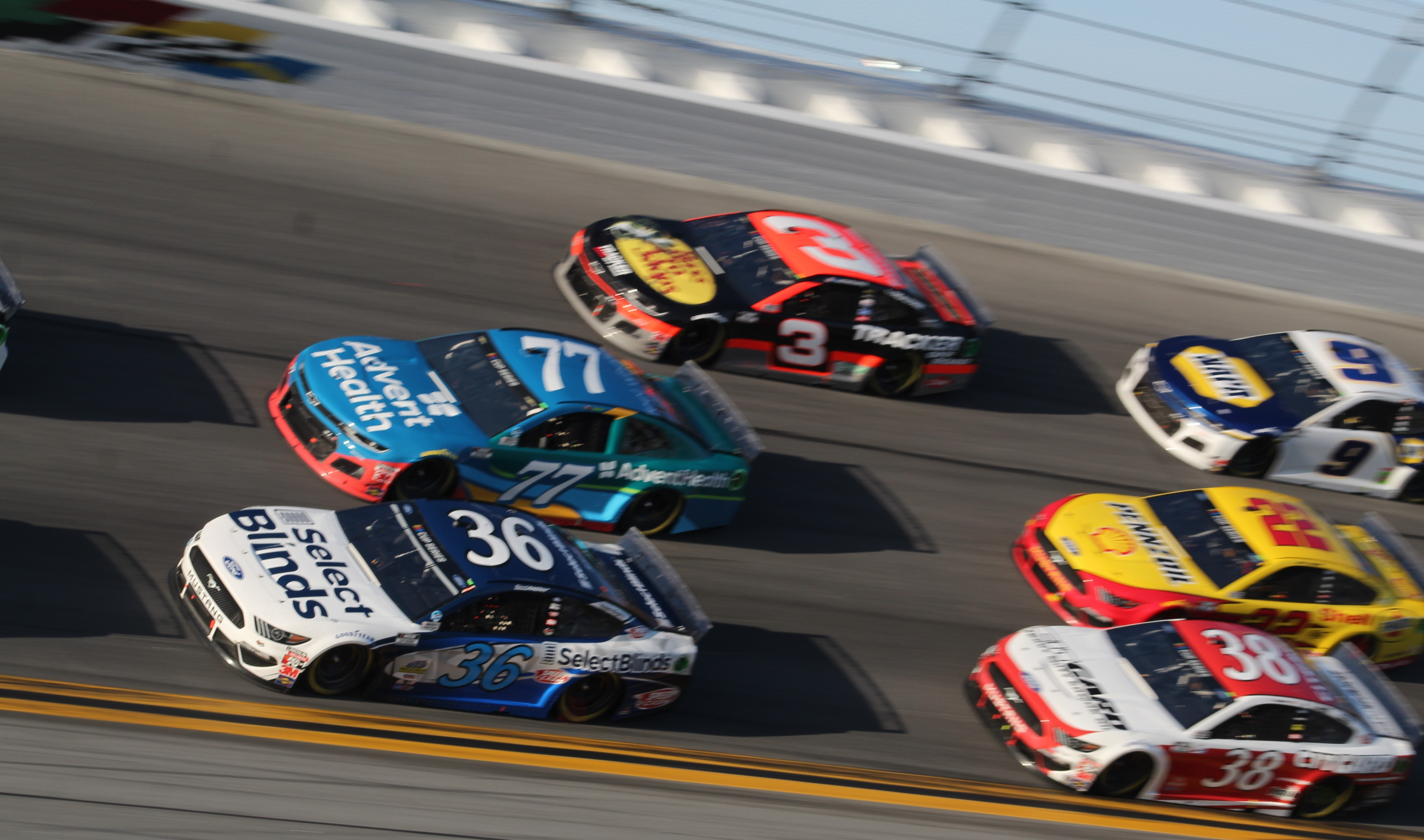
Ragan (No. 36) in the 2020 Daytona 500

In his retirement announcement, Ragan affirmed he was still open to racing part-time. On January 10, 2020, he announced that he would compete in the Daytona 500 with Rick Ware Racing, who partnered with Front Row Motorsports for this race to field Ragan's entry in the renumbered No. 36 Ford (usually the No. 53). The No. 36 was previously run by FRM teammate Matt Tifft in 2019 until the team scaled back operations. As part of this deal, FRM then leased the charter for the No. 36 (which they had kept for Ragan at the Daytona 500, giving him a guaranteed starting spot in the race) to RWR to use for the No. 53 for the remainder of the season. Ragan would qualify thirtieth in the 500 and go on to finish fourth, his first top-five since 2015 and his best ever finish in a Daytona 500, despite damage from one of the Big Ones occurring during the race.

After retiring, Ragan transitioned into a test driver role for Ford Performance, which included simulator testing and assisting in the development of the Next Gen car. In June, he was on the entry list to make his first Truck Series start since 2006 when he joined DGR-Crosley at Atlanta; the attempt was initially planned for Richmond until it was postponed due to the COVID-19 pandemic. However, due to random draw and the entry list exceeding forty entries, the truck did not make the field. A second attempt at Michigan also failed for the same reason. Ragan would finally appear in a Truck race in September at Darlington, where he finished 22nd. He switched from Cup to Truck points prior to the following week's race at Richmond to be eligible to compete.

Ragan returned to FRM in the No. 36 for the 2021 Daytona 500, although this year it was not in a partnership with Rick Ware Racing or another team with a charter. This meant that Ragan instead had no charter and had to race his way in through his Duel qualifying race.

Ragan returned to Rick Ware Racing in 2022, this time in their No. 15, attempting the 2022 Daytona 500, finishing eighth, his fourth career top-ten finish in a Daytona 500.

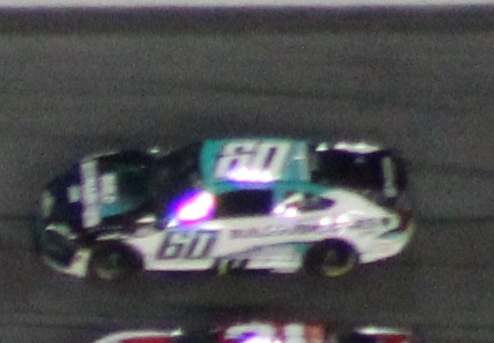
Ragan's No. 60 car.

On November 29, 2023, RFK Racing announced that Ragan would be driving the No. 60 Ford Mustang Dark Horse at the 2024 Daytona 500 as a part of their #Stage60 project. BuildSubmarines.com signed in to sponsor the ride. He finished the race in twentieth position after leading two laps in the race.

On July 6, 2024, NASCAR announced Ragan as the test driver for NASCAR's first electric racecar, the ABB NASCAR EV prototype, at the Chicago Street Course.

== Broadcasting ==
Ragan has appeared as a rotating contributor on NASCAR on Fox's NASCAR Race Hub show for multiple seasons, both when he was driving for Front Row Motorsports and after his retirement from full-time driving. Ragan was open to doing more TV (or radio) work in 2020, the first year after his last full season in the Cup Series, but he remained with Fox on Race Hub.

== Personal life ==
He is married to Jacquelyn; they have two daughters. He is also a Freemason; he was raised to the Master Mason degree on May 22, 2012, at Williams Lodge in Cornelius, NC.

== Motorsports career results ==
=== NASCAR ===
(key) (Bold – Pole position awarded by qualifying time. Italics – Pole position earned by points standings or practice time. * – Most laps led.)

==== Cup Series ====
NASCAR Cup Series results
| Year | Team | No. | Make | 1 | 2 | 3 | 4 | 5 | 6 | 7 | 8 | 9 | 10 | 11 | 12 | 13 | 14 | 15 | 16 | 17 | 18 | 19 | 20 | 21 | 22 | 23 | 24 | 25 | 26 | 27 | 28 | 29 | 30 | 31 | 32 | 33 | 34 | 35 | 36 | NCSC | Pts | Ref |
|---|---|---|---|---|---|---|---|---|---|---|---|---|---|---|---|---|---|---|---|---|---|---|---|---|---|---|---|---|---|---|---|---|---|---|---|---|---|---|---|---|---|---|
| 2006 | Roush Racing | 06 | Ford | DAY | CAL | LVS | ATL | BRI | MAR | TEX | PHO | TAL | RCH | DAR | CLT | DOV | POC | MCH | SON | DAY | CHI | NHA | POC | IND | GLN | MCH | BRI | CAL | RCH | NHA | DOV; 42 | KAN | TAL | CLT | MAR; 25 | ATL; Wth | | | | 63rd | 88 | |
| 2006 | No Fear Racing | 60 | Ford | | | | | | | | | | | | | | | | | | | | | | | | | | | | | | | | | | TEX; DNQ | PHO | HOM; DNQ | 63rd | 88 | |
| 2007 | Roush Fenway Racing | 6 | Ford | DAY; 5 | CAL; 16 | LVS; 37 | ATL; 33 | BRI; 26 | MAR; 15 | TEX; 39 | PHO; 41 | TAL; 17 | RCH; 20 | DAR; 27 | CLT; 37 | DOV; 14 | POC; 26 | MCH; 21 | SON; 29 | NHA; 15 | DAY; 12 | CHI; 25 | IND; 16 | POC; 33 | GLN; 32 | MCH; 18 | BRI; 41 | CAL; 12 | RCH; 3 | NHA; 19 | DOV; 25 | KAN; 16 | TAL; 34 | CLT; 40 | MAR; 26 | ATL; 33 | TEX; 37 | PHO; 32 | HOM; 10 | 23rd | 3251 | |
| 2008 | Roush Fenway Racing | 6 | Ford | DAY; 42 | CAL; 14 | LVS; 7 | ATL; 23 | BRI; 21 | MAR; 11 | TEX; 13 | PHO; 27 | TAL; 4 | RCH; 17 | DAR; 5 | CLT; 12 | DOV; 15 | POC; 24 | MCH; 8 | SON; 24 | NHA; 40 | DAY; 5 | CHI; 8 | IND; 14 | POC; 5 | GLN; 30 | MCH; 3 | BRI; 10 | CAL; 13 | RCH; 32 | NHA; 28 | DOV; 18 | KAN; 8 | TAL; 3 | CLT; 10 | MAR; 13 | ATL; 8 | TEX; 11 | PHO; 10 | HOM; 24 | 13th | 4299 | |
| 2009 | Roush Fenway Racing | 6 | Ford | DAY; 6 | CAL; 17 | LVS; 42 | ATL; 19 | BRI; 27 | MAR; 27 | TEX; 37 | PHO; 22 | TAL; 12 | RCH; 23 | DAR; 38 | CLT; 24 | DOV; 24 | POC; 26 | MCH; 15 | SON; 33 | NHA; 38 | DAY; 13 | CHI; 25 | IND; 24 | POC; 22 | GLN; 24 | MCH; 30 | BRI; 14 | ATL; 33 | RCH; 33 | NHA; 33 | DOV; 24 | KAN; 35 | CAL; 7 | CLT; 20 | MAR; 22 | TAL; 17 | TEX; 17 | PHO; 23 | HOM; 34 | 27th | 3252 | |
| 2010 | Roush Fenway Racing | 6 | Ford | DAY; 16 | CAL; 23 | LVS; 23 | ATL; 37 | BRI; 29 | MAR; 16 | PHO; 19 | TEX; 15 | TAL; 6 | RCH; 24 | DAR; 14 | DOV; 26 | CLT; 24 | POC; 26 | MCH; 34 | SON; 25 | NHA; 20 | DAY; 38 | CHI; 12 | IND; 20 | POC; 14 | GLN; 25 | MCH; 11 | BRI; 32 | ATL; 19 | RCH; 23 | NHA; 22 | DOV; 24 | KAN; 16 | CAL; 32 | CLT; 10 | MAR; 17 | TAL; 21 | TEX; 8 | PHO; 25 | HOM; 20 | 24th | 3599 | |
| 2011 | Roush Fenway Racing | 6 | Ford | DAY; 14 | PHO; 36 | LVS; 22 | BRI; 16 | CAL; 22 | MAR; 8 | **TEX**; 7 | TAL; 39 | RCH; 4 | DAR; 21 | DOV; 28 | CLT; 2 | KAN; 13 | POC; 17 | MCH; 20 | SON; 29 | DAY; 1 | KEN; 8 | NHA; 14 | **IND**; 23 | POC; 34 | GLN; 28 | MCH; 14 | BRI; 20 | ATL; 35 | RCH; 4 | CHI; 11 | NHA; 7 | DOV; 21 | KAN; 20 | CLT; 11 | TAL; 28 | MAR; 33 | TEX; 12 | PHO; 33 | HOM; 38 | 23rd | 906 | |
| 2012 | Front Row Motorsports | 34 | Ford | DAY; 43 | PHO; 25 | LVS; 21 | BRI; 23 | CAL; 31 | MAR; 24 | TEX; 35 | KAN; 30 | RCH; 32 | TAL; 7 | DAR; 28 | CLT; 35 | DOV; 21 | POC; 27 | MCH; 23 | SON; 27 | KEN; 29 | DAY; 26 | NHA; 34 | IND; 28 | POC; 28 | GLN; 22 | MCH; 23 | BRI; 32 | ATL; 28 | RCH; 32 | CHI; 22 | NHA; 29 | DOV; 30 | TAL; 4 | CLT; 34 | KAN; 20 | MAR; 26 | TEX; 28 | PHO; 33 | HOM; 31 | 28th | 622 | |
| 2013 | Front Row Motorsports | 34 | Ford | DAY; 35 | PHO; 38 | LVS; 31 | BRI; 21 | CAL; 24 | MAR; 30 | TEX; 26 | KAN; 30 | RCH; 20 | TAL; 1 | DAR; 39 | CLT; 25 | DOV; 22 | POC; 37 | MCH; 25 | SON; 33 | KEN; 26 | DAY; 22 | NHA; 19 | IND; 34 | POC; 21 | GLN; 21 | MCH; 24 | BRI; 12 | ATL; 23 | RCH; 29 | CHI; 26 | NHA; 29 | DOV; 25 | KAN; 36 | CLT; 30 | TAL; 6 | MAR; 43 | TEX; 42 | PHO; 35 | HOM; 29 | 28th | 633 | |
| 2014 | Front Row Motorsports | 34 | Ford | DAY; 34 | PHO; 28 | LVS; 32 | BRI; 31 | CAL; 27 | MAR; 28 | TEX; 35 | DAR; 32 | RCH; 30 | TAL; 35 | KAN; 38 | CLT; 31 | DOV; 36 | POC; 18 | MCH; 38 | SON; 36 | KEN; 31 | DAY; 22 | NHA; 25 | IND; 35 | POC; 19 | GLN; 19 | MCH; 24 | BRI; 23 | ATL; 27 | RCH; 33 | CHI; 31 | NHA; 42 | DOV; 31 | KAN; 27 | CLT; 34 | TAL; 30 | MAR; 10 | TEX; 32 | PHO; 25 | HOM; 30 | 32nd | 531 | |
| 2015 | Front Row Motorsports | 34 | Ford | DAY; 17 | | | | | | | | | | | | | | | | | | | | | | | | | | | | | | | | | | | | 27th | 701 | |
| 2015 | Joe Gibbs Racing | 18 | Toyota | | ATL; 18 | LVS; 22 | PHO; 21 | CAL; 18 | MAR; 5 | TEX; 13 | BRI; 41 | RCH; 23 | TAL; 38 | | | | | | | | | | | | | | | | | | | | | | | | | | | 27th | 701 | |
| 2015 | Michael Waltrip Racing | 55 | Toyota | | | | | | | | | | | KAN; 33 | CLT; 41 | DOV; 13 | POC; 23 | MCH; 35 | SON; 39 | DAY; 12 | KEN; 18 | NHA; 18 | IND; 21 | POC; 17 | GLN; 23 | MCH; 18 | BRI; 40 | DAR; 40 | RCH; 17 | CHI; 15 | NHA; 41 | DOV; 22 | CLT; 37 | KAN; 25 | TAL; 30 | MAR; 25 | TEX; 23 | PHO; 18 | HOM; 27 | 27th | 701 | |
| 2016 | BK Racing | 23 | Toyota | DAY; 29 | ATL; 32 | LVS; 32 | PHO; 24 | CAL; 22 | MAR; 21 | TEX; 33 | BRI; 39 | RCH; 23 | TAL; 34 | KAN; 29 | DOV; 17 | CLT; 31 | POC; 23 | MCH; 22 | SON; 32 | DAY; 16 | KEN; 22 | NHA; 30 | IND; 37 | POC; 32 | GLN; 33 | BRI; 21 | MCH; 29 | DAR; 21 | RCH; 34 | CHI; 35 | NHA; 32 | DOV; 30 | CLT; 23 | KAN; 36 | TAL; 24 | MAR; 37 | TEX; 33 | PHO; 31 | HOM; 29 | 33rd | 455 | |
| 2017 | Front Row Motorsports | 38 | Ford | DAY; 25 | ATL; 23 | LVS; 29 | PHO; 35 | CAL; 31 | MAR; 24 | TEX; 28 | BRI; 23 | RCH; 19 | TAL; 10 | KAN; 17 | CLT; 23 | DOV; 30 | POC; 25 | MCH; 29 | SON; 31 | DAY; 6 | KEN; 24 | NHA; 29 | IND; 38 | POC; 22 | GLN; 27 | MCH; 30 | BRI; 17 | DAR; 25 | RCH; 27 | CHI; 29 | NHA; 29 | DOV; 21 | CLT; 37 | TAL; 10 | KAN; 17 | MAR; 28 | TEX; 30 | PHO; 33 | HOM; 17 | 30th | 447 | |
| 2018 | Front Row Motorsports | 38 | Ford | DAY; 30 | ATL; 23 | LVS; 23 | PHO; 22 | CAL; 25 | MAR; 25 | TEX; 23 | BRI; 12 | RCH; 33 | TAL; 6 | DOV; 27 | KAN; 13 | CLT; 25 | POC; 16 | MCH; 38 | SON; 22 | CHI; 38 | DAY; 15 | KEN; 18 | NHA; 29 | POC; 19 | GLN; 26 | MCH; 27 | BRI; 17 | DAR; 18 | IND; 24 | LVS; 27 | RCH; 23 | ROV; 16 | DOV; 24 | TAL; 39 | KAN; 19 | MAR; 18 | TEX; 24 | PHO; 20 | HOM; 20 | 25th | 524 | |
| 2019 | Front Row Motorsports | 38 | Ford | DAY; 30 | ATL; 16 | LVS; 28 | PHO; 25 | CAL; 25 | MAR; 26 | TEX; 25 | BRI; 21 | RCH; 28 | TAL; 23 | DOV; 26 | KAN; 27 | CLT; 15 | POC; 30 | MCH; 34 | SON; 20 | CHI; 23 | DAY; 38 | KEN; 29 | NHA; 34 | POC; 36 | GLN; 22 | MCH; 16 | BRI; 36 | DAR; 26 | IND; 20 | LVS; 22 | RCH; 19 | ROV; 35 | DOV; 27 | TAL; 29 | KAN; 26 | MAR; 11 | TEX; 35 | PHO; 36 | HOM; 27 | 30th | 388 | |
| 2020 | Rick Ware Racing (Note: Entry was prepared by Front Row Motorsports, fielded under RWR banner.) | 36 | Ford | DAY; 4 | LVS | CAL | PHO | DAR | DAR | CLT | CLT | BRI | ATL | MAR | HOM | TAL | POC | POC | IND | KEN | TEX | KAN | NHA | MCH | MCH | DRC | DOV | DOV | DAY | DAR | RCH | BRI | LVS | TAL | ROV | KAN | TEX | MAR | PHO | 39th | 0^{1} | |
| 2021 | Front Row Motorsports | 36 | Ford | DAY; 37 | DRC | HOM | LVS | PHO | ATL | BRD | MAR | RCH | TAL | KAN | DAR | DOV | COA | CLT | SON | NSH | POC | POC | ROA | ATL | NHA | GLN | IRC | MCH | DAY | DAR | RCH | BRI | LVS | TAL | ROV | TEX | KAN | MAR | PHO | 38th | 4 | |
| 2022 | Rick Ware Racing | 15 | Ford | DAY; 8 | CAL | LVS | PHO | ATL; 18 | COA | RCH | MAR | BRD | TAL; 24 | DOV | DAR | KAN | CLT | GTW | SON | NSH | ROA | ATL | NHA | POC | IRC | MCH | RCH | GLN | DAY; 9 | DAR | KAN | BRI | TEX | TAL | ROV | LVS | HOM | MAR | PHO | 33rd | 89 | |
| 2024 | RFK Racing | 60 | Ford | DAY; 20 | ATL | LVS | PHO | BRI | COA | RCH | MAR | TEX | TAL | DOV | KAN | DAR | CLT | GTW | SON | IOW | NHA | NSH | CSC | POC | IND | RCH | MCH | DAY | DAR | ATL | GLN | BRI | KAN | TAL | ROV | LVS | HOM | MAR | PHO | 40th | 17 | |

===== Daytona 500 =====
| Year | Team | Manufacturer | Start | Finish |
|---|---|---|---|---|
| 2007 | Roush Fenway Racing | Ford | 35 | 5 |
| 2008 | Roush Fenway Racing | Ford | 14 | 42 |
| 2009 | Roush Fenway Racing | Ford | 33 | 6 |
| 2010 | Roush Fenway Racing | Ford | 19 | 16 |
| 2011 | Roush Fenway Racing | Ford | 34 | 14 |
| 2012 | Front Row Motorsports | Ford | 25 | 43 |
| 2013 | Front Row Motorsports | Ford | 35 | 35 |
| 2014 | Front Row Motorsports | Ford | 43 | 34 |
| 2015 | Front Row Motorsports | Ford | 28 | 17 |
| 2016 | BK Racing | Toyota | 29 | 29 |
| 2017 | Front Row Motorsports | Ford | 20 | 25 |
| 2018 | Front Row Motorsports | Ford | 15 | 30 |
| 2019 | Front Row Motorsports | Ford | 24 | 30 |
| 2020 | Rick Ware Racing | Ford | 30 | 4 |
| 2021 | Front Row Motorsports | Ford | 18 | 37 |
| 2022 | Rick Ware Racing | Ford | 34 | 8 |
| 2024 | RFK Racing | Ford | 40 | 20 |

==== Xfinity Series ====
NASCAR Xfinity Series results
| Year | Team | No. | Make | 1 | 2 | 3 | 4 | 5 | 6 | 7 | 8 | 9 | 10 | 11 | 12 | 13 | 14 | 15 | 16 | 17 | 18 | 19 | 20 | 21 | 22 | 23 | 24 | 25 | 26 | 27 | 28 | 29 | 30 | 31 | 32 | 33 | 34 | 35 | NXSC | Pts | Ref |
|---|---|---|---|---|---|---|---|---|---|---|---|---|---|---|---|---|---|---|---|---|---|---|---|---|---|---|---|---|---|---|---|---|---|---|---|---|---|---|---|---|---|
| 2004 | Sadler Brothers Racing | 95 | Ford | DAY | CAR | LVS | DAR | BRI | TEX | NSH | TAL | CAL | GTW | RCH | NZH | CLT | DOV | NSH | KEN | MLW | DAY | CHI | NHA | PPR | IRP | MCH | BRI | CAL | RCH | DOV | KAN | CLT | MEM; DNQ | ATL | PHO | DAR | HOM; 31 | | 131st | 70 | |
| 2005 | Day Enterprises | 16 | Chevy | DAY | CAL | MXC | LVS | ATL | NSH | BRI | TEX; 39 | PHO | TAL | DAR | RCH | CLT | DOV | NSH | KEN | MLW; 36 | DAY | CHI | NHA | PPR | GTW; 32 | IRP | GLN | MCH | BRI; DNQ | CAL | RCH | DOV | KAN | CLT | MEM | TEX | PHO | HOM | 97th | 168 | |
| 2006 | Roush Racing | 50 | Ford | DAY | CAL | MXC | LVS | ATL | BRI | TEX | NSH | PHO | TAL | RCH | DAR | CLT | DOV | NSH | KEN | MLW | DAY | CHI | NHA | MAR | GTW | IRP | GLN | MCH | BRI | CAL; 41 | RCH | DOV; 18 | KAN | | | | | | 92nd | 204 | |
| 2006 | Roush Racing | 6 | Ford | | | | | | | | | | | | | | | | | | | | | | | | | | | | | | | CLT; 36 | MEM | TEX | PHO | HOM | 92nd | 204 | |
| 2007 | Roush Fenway Racing | 6 | Ford | DAY; 43 | CAL; 18 | MXC; 14 | LVS; 24 | ATL; 20 | BRI; 13 | NSH; 36 | **TEX**; 5 | PHO; 35 | TAL; 4 | RCH; 14 | DAR; 13 | CLT; 25 | DOV; 32 | NSH; 7 | KEN; 8 | MLW; 12 | NHA; 18 | DAY; 34 | CHI; 19 | GTW; 5 | IRP; 18 | CGV; 19 | GLN; 21 | MCH; 21 | BRI; 6 | CAL; 10 | RCH; 39 | DOV; 32 | KAN; 34 | CLT; 6 | MEM; 3 | TEX; 17 | PHO; 23 | **HOM**; 33 | 5th | 3739 | |
| 2008 | Roush Fenway Racing | 6 | Ford | DAY; 9 | CAL; 12 | LVS; 10 | ATL; 16 | BRI; 8 | NSH; 21 | TEX; 8 | PHO; 5 | MXC; 22 | TAL; 18 | RCH; 4 | DAR; 27 | CLT; 9 | DOV; 29 | NSH; 5 | KEN; 7 | MLW; 4 | NHA; 6 | DAY; 9 | CHI; 13 | GTW; 10 | IRP; 9 | CGV; 13 | GLN; 9 | MCH; 36 | BRI; 25 | CAL; 9 | RCH; 5 | DOV; 9 | KAN; 3 | CLT; 12 | MEM; 8 | TEX; 5 | PHO; 14 | HOM; 23 | 4th | 4525 | |
| 2009 | Roush Fenway Racing | 6 | Ford | DAY; 8 | CAL; 5 | LVS; 26 | BRI; 19 | TEX; 4 | NSH; 7 | PHO; 6 | TAL; 1 | RCH | DAR | CLT; 7 | DOV; 30 | NSH | KEN | MLW | NHA | DAY; 9 | CHI; 34 | GTW | IRP | IOW | GLN; 8 | MCH; 4 | BRI; 1 | CGV | ATL; 9 | RCH | DOV | KAN | CAL; 9 | CLT | MEM | TEX; 8 | PHO; 6 | HOM | 18th | 2632 | |
| 2011 | Randy Hill Racing | 08 | Ford | DAY | PHO | LVS | BRI | CAL | TEX | TAL | NSH | RCH | DAR | DOV | IOW | CLT | CHI | MCH | ROA | DAY | KEN | NHA | NSH | IRP | IOW | GLN | CGV | BRI | ATL | RCH | CHI | DOV | KAN | CLT | TEX; 35 | PHO | HOM | | 133rd | 0^{1} | |
| 2012 | GC Motorsports International | 27 | Ford | DAY; 27 | PHO | LVS | BRI | CAL | TEX; 6 | RCH | TAL | DAR | IOW | CLT | DOV | MCH | ROA | KEN | DAY | NHA | CHI | IND | IOW | GLN | CGV | BRI | ATL | RCH | CHI | KEN | DOV | CLT | KAN | TEX | PHO | HOM | | | 118th | 0^{1} | |
| 2014 | Biagi-DenBeste Racing | 98 | Ford | DAY; DNQ | PHO | LVS; 17 | BRI | CAL; 13 | TEX | DAR | RCH | TAL; 4 | IOW | CLT | DOV | MCH | ROA | KEN | DAY; 23 | NHA | CHI | IND; 13 | IOW | GLN | MOH | BRI | ATL; 8 | RCH | CHI | KEN | DOV | KAN | CLT | TEX | PHO | HOM | | | 89th | 0^{1} | |
| 2015 | Joe Gibbs Racing | 20 | Toyota | DAY | ATL | LVS | PHO | CAL | TEX | BRI | RCH | TAL | IOW | CLT | DOV | MCH | CHI | DAY; 7 | KEN | NHA | IND | IOW | GLN | MOH | BRI | ROA | DAR | RCH | CHI | KEN | DOV | CLT | KAN | TEX | PHO | HOM | | | 94th | 0^{1} | |
| 2016 | Joe Gibbs Racing | 18 | Toyota | DAY | ATL | LVS | PHO | CAL | TEX | BRI | RCH | TAL | DOV | CLT | POC | MCH | IOW | **DAY**; 21 | KEN | NHA | IND | IOW | GLN | MOH | BRI | ROA | DAR | RCH | CHI | KEN | DOV | CLT | KAN | TEX | PHO | HOM | | | 115th | 0^{1} | |

==== Gander RV & Outdoors Truck Series ====
NASCAR Gander RV & Outdoors Truck Series results
| Year | Team | No. | Make | 1 | 2 | 3 | 4 | 5 | 6 | 7 | 8 | 9 | 10 | 11 | 12 | 13 | 14 | 15 | 16 | 17 | 18 | 19 | 20 | 21 | 22 | 23 | 24 | 25 | NGTC | Pts | Ref |
|---|---|---|---|---|---|---|---|---|---|---|---|---|---|---|---|---|---|---|---|---|---|---|---|---|---|---|---|---|---|---|---|
| 2004 | Fiddleback Racing | 66 | Ford | DAY | ATL | MAR | MFD; DNQ | CLT | DOV | | | | | | | | | | | | | | | | | | | | 32nd | 802 | |
| 2004 | Fiddleback Racing | 67 | Ford | | | | | | | TEX; 20 | MEM | MLW | KAN | KEN; 19 | GTW; 19 | MCH; 31 | IRP; 35 | NSH; 32 | BRI; 30 | RCH; 35 | NHA; 21 | LVS; 34 | CAL | TEX | MAR | PHO | DAR | HOM | 32nd | 802 | |
| 2005 | Rosenblum Racing | 28 | Chevy | DAY; DNQ | CAL | ATL | MAR | GTW | MFD | CLT; DNQ | DOV | TEX | MCH | MLW | KAN | KEN | MEM | IRP | NSH | BRI | RCH | NHA | LVS | MAR | ATL | TEX | PHO | HOM | N/A | – | |
| 2006 | Roush Racing | 50 | Ford | DAY | CAL | ATL; 22 | MAR; 34 | | CLT; 25 | MFD | DOV | | MCH; 19 | | | | | | | BRI; 15 | NHA; 11 | LVS | TAL; 7 | MAR; 20 | ATL; 6 | | PHO; 17 | HOM | 24th | 2122 | |
| 2006 | Roush Racing | 6 | Ford | | | | | **GTW**; 28 | | | | TEX; 8 | | MLW; 30 | KAN; 6 | KEN; 5 | MEM; 6 | **IRP**; 9 | NSH; 34 | | | | | | | TEX; 6 | | | 24th | 2122 | |
| 2020 | DGR-Crosley | 17 | Ford | DAY | LVS | CLT | ATL; DNQ | HOM | POC | KEN | TEX | KAN | KAN | MCH; DNQ | DRC | DOV | GTW | DAR; 22 | RCH; 7 | BRI | LVS | TAL | KAN | TEX | MAR | PHO | | | 48th | 37^{2} | |

^{*} Season still in progress
^{1} Ineligible for series points
^{2} Switched to Truck Series points prior to Richmond

=== ARCA Re/Max Series ===
(key) (Bold – Pole position awarded by qualifying time. Italics – Pole position earned by points standings or practice time. * – Most laps led.)

ARCA Re/Max Series results
| Year | Team | No. | Make | 1 | 2 | 3 | 4 | 5 | 6 | 7 | 8 | 9 | 10 | 11 | 12 | 13 | 14 | 15 | 16 | 17 | 18 | 19 | 20 | 21 | 22 | 23 | ARMC | Pts | Ref |
|---|---|---|---|---|---|---|---|---|---|---|---|---|---|---|---|---|---|---|---|---|---|---|---|---|---|---|---|---|---|
| 2003 | Mark Gibson Racing | 56 | Ford | DAY | ATL | NSH | SLM | TOL | KEN | CLT | BLN | KAN | MCH | LER; 12 | POC | POC | NSH | ISF | WIN | DSF | CHI | SLM | TAL | CLT | | | 92nd | 285 | |
| 2003 | Roger Williams Racing | 95 | Ford | | | | | | | | | | | | | | | | | | | | | | SBO; 23 | | 92nd | 285 | |
| 2004 | Sadler Brothers Racing | 95 | Ford | DAY; DNQ | NSH; 19 | | | | | | | | | | | | | | | | | | | | | | 32nd | 865 | |
| 2004 | Sadler Brothers Racing | 2 | Ford | DAY; 25 | | | | | | | | | | | | | | | | | | | | | | | 32nd | 865 | |
| 2004 | Roger Williams Racing | 95 | Ford | | | SLM; 19 | KEN; 37 | TOL | | | | | | | | | | | | | | | | | | | 32nd | 865 | |
| 2004 | Bobby Jones Racing | 88 | Dodge | | | | | | CLT; 19 | KAN | POC | MCH; 32 | SBO | BLN | KEN; 2 | GTW | POC | LER | NSH | ISF | TOL | DSF | CHI | SLM | TAL | | 32nd | 865 | |
| 2005 | Day Enterprise Racing | 90 | Dodge | DAY; 32 | | | | | | | | | | | | | | | | | | | | | | | 14th | 3820 | |
| 2005 | Day Enterprise Racing | 90 | Chevy | | NSH; DNQ | | KEN; 12 | | | | | | | | | | | | | | | | | | | TAL; 8 | 14th | 3820 | |
| 2005 | Day Enterprise Racing | 90 | Ford | | | SLM; 3 | | | **LAN**; 1 | **MIL**; 29 | POC; 26 | MCH; 27 | KAN | KEN; 17 | | POC; 4 | GTW; 2 | LER | NSH; 30 | MCH; 4 | ISF | **TOL**; 2 | DSF; 10 | CHI; 2 | SLM; 16 | | 14th | 3820 | |
| 2005 | Day Enterprise Racing | 90 | Pontiac | | | | | TOL; 4 | | | | | | | BLN; 6 | | | | | | | | | | | | 14th | 3820 | |
| 2007 | Roulo Brothers Racing | 39 | Ford | DAY; 4 | USA | NSH | SLM | KAN | WIN | KEN | TOL | IOW | POC | MCH | BLN | KEN | POC | NSH | ISF | MIL | GTW | DSF | CHI | SLM | TAL | TOL | 104th | 210 | |
| 2008 | Roulo Brothers Racing | 39 | Ford | DAY | SLM | IOW | KAN | CAR | KEN | TOL; 5 | POC | MCH | CAY | KEN | BLN | POC | NSH | ISF | DSF | CHI | SLM | NJE | TAL | TOL; 15 | | | 51st | 590 | |

=== Rolex Sports Car Series ===
==== Grand Touring ====
(key) Bold – Pole Position. (Overall Finish/Class Finish).

Grand-Am Rolex Sports Car Series GT results
| Year | Team | No. | Engine | Chassis | 1 | 2 | 3 | 4 | 5 | 6 | 7 | 8 | 9 | 10 | 11 | 12 | Pos | Pts | Ref |
|---|---|---|---|---|---|---|---|---|---|---|---|---|---|---|---|---|---|---|---|
| 2011 | TPN Racing | 11 | | Ford Mustang GT | DAY | HOM | BAR | VIR | LRP | WGL (23/11) | ELK | LGA | NJ | WGL | MON | MOH | 83rd | 19 | |

== Notes ==
Achievements
| Preceded by Danny O'Quinn | NASCAR Busch Series Rookie of the Year; 2007 | Succeeded by Landon Cassill |
