= 2018 Folds of Honor QuikTrip 500 =

Race details
- Race 2 of 36 in the 2018 Monster Energy NASCAR Cup Series
- 2018 Folds of Honor QuikTrip 500 program cover, featuring Jimmie Johnson and Ryan Newman.
- Date: February 25, 2018
- Location: Atlanta Motor Speedway in Hampton, Georgia
- Course: Permanent racing facility
- Course length: 1.54 miles (2.48 km)
- Distance: 325 laps, 500.5 mi (806 km)
- Average speed: 143.068 miles per hour (230.246 km/h)

Pole position
Driver	Kyle Busch	Joe Gibbs Racing
- Time: 30.024

Most laps led
Driver	Kevin Harvick	Stewart–Haas Racing
- Laps: 181

Winner
No. 4	Kevin Harvick	Stewart–Haas Racing

Television in the United States
- Network: Fox
- Announcers: Mike Joy, Jeff Gordon and Darrell Waltrip
- Nielsen ratings: 3.3/3.1 (Overnight)

Radio in the United States
- Radio: PRN
- Booth announcers: Doug Rice, Mark Garrow and Wendy Venturini
- Turn announcers: Rob Albright (1 & 2) and Pat Patterson (3 & 4)

The 2018 Folds of Honor QuikTrip 500 was a Monster Energy NASCAR Cup Series race held on February 25, 2018, at Atlanta Motor Speedway in Hampton, Georgia. Contested over 325 laps on the 1.54-mile-long (2.48 km) asphalt quad-oval intermediate speedway, it was the second race of the 2018 Monster Energy NASCAR Cup Series season.

== Entry list ==
No.	Driver	Team	Manufacturer
00	Jeffrey Earnhardt	StarCom Racing	Chevrolet
1	Jamie McMurray	Chip Ganassi Racing	Chevrolet
2	Brad Keselowski	Team Penske	Ford
3	Austin Dillon	Richard Childress Racing	Chevrolet
4	Kevin Harvick	Stewart–Haas Racing	Ford
6	Trevor Bayne	Roush Fenway Racing	Ford
9	Chase Elliott	Hendrick Motorsports	Chevrolet
10	Aric Almirola	Stewart–Haas Racing	Ford
11	Denny Hamlin	Joe Gibbs Racing	Toyota
12	Ryan Blaney	Team Penske	Ford
13	Ty Dillon	Germain Racing	Chevrolet
14	Clint Bowyer	Stewart–Haas Racing	Ford
15	Ross Chastain (i)	Premium Motorsports	Chevrolet
17	Ricky Stenhouse Jr.	Roush Fenway Racing	Ford
18	Kyle Busch	Joe Gibbs Racing	Toyota
19	Daniel Suárez	Joe Gibbs Racing	Toyota
20	Erik Jones	Joe Gibbs Racing	Toyota
21	Paul Menard	Wood Brothers Racing	Ford
22	Joey Logano	Team Penske	Ford
23	Gray Gaulding	BK Racing	Toyota
24	William Byron (R)	Hendrick Motorsports	Chevrolet
31	Ryan Newman	Richard Childress Racing	Chevrolet
32	Matt DiBenedetto	Go Fas Racing	Ford
34	Michael McDowell	Front Row Motorsports	Ford
37	Chris Buescher	JTG Daugherty Racing	Chevrolet
38	David Ragan	Front Row Motorsports	Ford
41	Kurt Busch	Stewart–Haas Racing	Ford
42	Kyle Larson	Chip Ganassi Racing	Chevrolet
43	Bubba Wallace (R)	Richard Petty Motorsports	Chevrolet
47	A. J. Allmendinger	JTG Daugherty Racing	Chevrolet
48	Jimmie Johnson	Hendrick Motorsports	Chevrolet
51	Harrison Rhodes	Rick Ware Racing	Chevrolet
72	Cole Whitt	TriStar Motorsports	Chevrolet
78	Martin Truex Jr.	Furniture Row Racing	Toyota
88	Alex Bowman	Hendrick Motorsports	Chevrolet
95	Kasey Kahne	Leavine Family Racing	Chevrolet
Official entry list

== First practice ==
Ricky Stenhouse Jr. was the fastest in the first practice session with a time of 29.745 seconds and a speed of 186.384 mph (299.956 km/h).

Pos	No.	Driver	Team	Manufacturer	Time	Speed
1	17	Ricky Stenhouse Jr.	Roush Fenway Racing	Ford	29.745	186.384
2	42	Kyle Larson	Chip Ganassi Racing	Chevrolet	29.820	185.915
3	43	Bubba Wallace (R)	Richard Petty Motorsports	Chevrolet	29.833	185.834
Official first practice results

== Qualifying ==
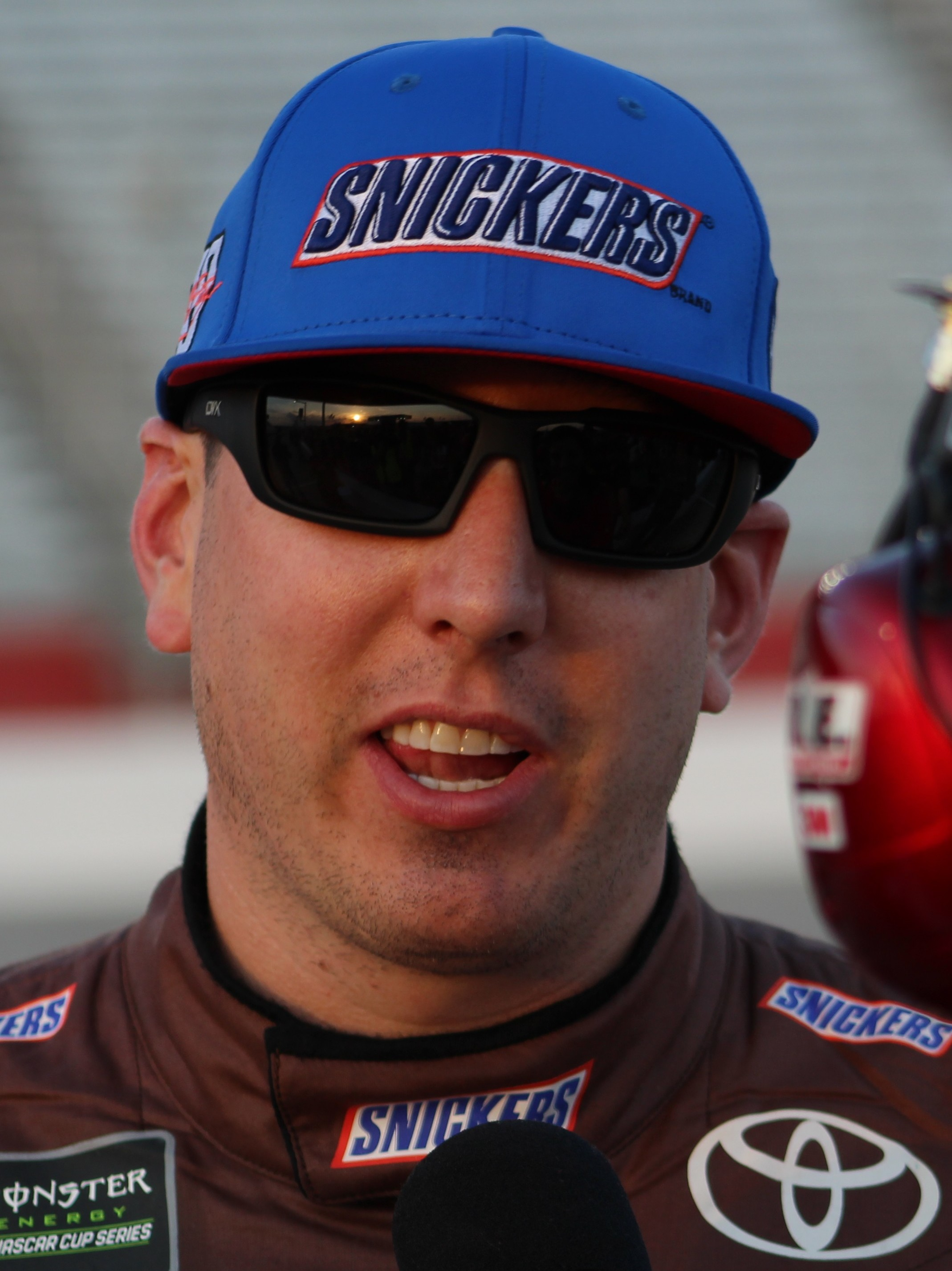
Kyle Busch scored the pole position.

Kyle Busch scored the pole for the race with a time of 30.024 and a speed of 184.652 mph (297.169 km/h).

=== Qualifying results ===
Pos	No.	Driver	Team	Manufacturer	R1	R2	R3
1	18	Kyle Busch	Joe Gibbs Racing	Toyota	30.140	30.178	30.024
2	31	Ryan Newman	Richard Childress Racing	Chevrolet	30.091	30.218	30.062
3	4	Kevin Harvick	Stewart–Haas Racing	Ford	29.869	30.043	30.067
4	19	Daniel Suárez	Joe Gibbs Racing	Toyota	30.075	30.084	30.093
5	2	Brad Keselowski	Team Penske	Ford	29.737	30.152	30.154
6	17	Ricky Stenhouse Jr.	Roush Fenway Racing	Ford	30.132	30.212	30.176
7	41	Kurt Busch	Stewart–Haas Racing	Ford	30.126	30.155	30.215
8	42	Kyle Larson	Chip Ganassi Racing	Chevrolet	30.025	30.101	30.221
9	14	Clint Bowyer	Stewart–Haas Racing	Ford	29.988	30.248	30.414
10	20	Erik Jones	Joe Gibbs Racing	Toyota	30.299	30.292	30.621
11	10	Aric Almirola	Stewart–Haas Racing	Ford	30.251	30.224	0.000
12	11	Denny Hamlin	Joe Gibbs Racing	Toyota	30.240	30.303	0.000
13	1	Jamie McMurray	Chip Ganassi Racing	Chevrolet	30.025	30.324	—
14	95	Kasey Kahne	Leavine Family Racing	Chevrolet	30.433	30.377	—
15	21	Paul Menard	Wood Brothers Racing	Ford	30.242	30.384	—
16	22	Joey Logano	Team Penske	Ford	30.117	30.440	—
17	34	Michael McDowell	Front Row Motorsports	Ford	30.475	30.469	—
18	88	Alex Bowman	Hendrick Motorsports	Chevrolet	30.146	30.523	—
19	43	Bubba Wallace (R)	Richard Petty Motorsports	Chevrolet	30.439	30.551	—
20	6	Trevor Bayne	Roush Fenway Racing	Ford	30.350	30.578	—
21	47	A. J. Allmendinger	JTG Daugherty Racing	Chevrolet	30.433	30.588	—
22	48	Jimmie Johnson	Hendrick Motorsports	Chevrolet	30.194	30.590	—
23	24	William Byron (R)	Hendrick Motorsports	Chevrolet	30.088	30.663	—
24	37	Chris Buescher	JTG Daugherty Racing	Chevrolet	30.488	0.000	—
25	3	Austin Dillon	Richard Childress Racing	Chevrolet	30.503	—	—
26	12	Ryan Blaney	Team Penske	Ford	30.537	—	—
27	9	Chase Elliott	Hendrick Motorsports	Chevrolet	30.616	—	—
28	13	Ty Dillon	Germain Racing	Chevrolet	30.750	—	—
29	38	David Ragan	Front Row Motorsports	Ford	30.780	—	—
30	32	Matt DiBenedetto	Go Fas Racing	Ford	30.987	—	—
31	23	Gray Gaulding	BK Racing	Toyota	31.099	—	—
32	72	Cole Whitt	TriStar Motorsports	Chevrolet	31.314	—	—
33	00	Jeffrey Earnhardt	StarCom Racing	Chevrolet	31.671	—	—
34	15	Ross Chastain (i)	Premium Motorsports	Chevrolet	31.796	—	—
35	78	Martin Truex Jr.	Furniture Row Racing	Toyota	0.000	—	—
36	51	Harrison Rhodes	Rick Ware Racing	Chevrolet	0.000	—	—
Official qualifying results

== Final practice ==
Ryan Newman was the fastest in the final practice session with a time of 29.989 seconds and a speed of 184.868 mph (297.516 km/h).

Pos	No.	Driver	Team	Manufacturer	Time	Speed
1	31	Ryan Newman	Richard Childress Racing	Chevrolet	29.989	184.868
2	78	Martin Truex Jr.	Furniture Row Racing	Toyota	30.033	184.597
3	21	Paul Menard	Wood Brothers Racing	Ford	30.038	184.566
Official final practice results

== Race results ==
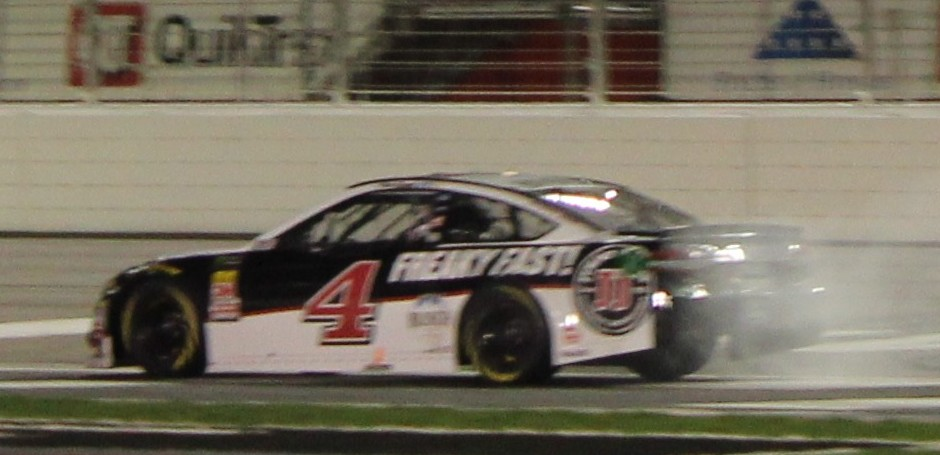
Kevin Harvick won the race.

=== Stage Results ===
Stage 1 Laps: 85

Pos	No	Driver	Team	Manufacturer	Points
1	4	Kevin Harvick	Stewart–Haas Racing	Ford	10
2	14	Clint Bowyer	Stewart–Haas Racing	Ford	9
3	2	Brad Keselowski	Team Penske	Ford	8
4	78	Martin Truex Jr.	Furniture Row Racing	Toyota	7
5	10	Aric Almirola	Stewart–Haas Racing	Ford	6
6	18	Kyle Busch	Joe Gibbs Racing	Toyota	5
7	42	Kyle Larson	Chip Ganassi Racing	Chevrolet	4
8	41	Kurt Busch	Stewart–Haas Racing	Ford	3
9	11	Denny Hamlin	Joe Gibbs Racing	Toyota	2
10	22	Joey Logano	Team Penske	Ford	1
Official stage one results

Stage 2 Laps: 85

Pos	No	Driver	Team	Manufacturer	Points
1	2	Brad Keselowski	Team Penske	Ford	10
2	41	Kurt Busch	Stewart–Haas Racing	Ford	9
3	18	Kyle Busch	Joe Gibbs Racing	Toyota	8
4	22	Joey Logano	Team Penske	Ford	7
5	4	Kevin Harvick	Stewart–Haas Racing	Ford	6
6	11	Denny Hamlin	Joe Gibbs Racing	Toyota	5
7	42	Kyle Larson	Chip Ganassi Racing	Chevrolet	4
8	10	Aric Almirola	Stewart–Haas Racing	Ford	3
9	14	Clint Bowyer	Stewart–Haas Racing	Ford	2
10	19	Daniel Suárez	Joe Gibbs Racing	Toyota	1
Official stage two results

=== Final Stage Results ===
Stage 3 Laps: 155

Pos	Grid	No	Driver	Team	Manufacturer	Laps	Points
1	3	4	Kevin Harvick	Stewart–Haas Racing	Ford	325	56
2	5	2	Brad Keselowski	Team Penske	Ford	325	53
3	9	14	Clint Bowyer	Stewart–Haas Racing	Ford	325	45
4	12	11	Denny Hamlin	Joe Gibbs Racing	Toyota	325	40
5	35	78	Martin Truex Jr.	Furniture Row Racing	Toyota	325	39
6	16	22	Joey Logano	Team Penske	Ford	325	39
7	1	18	Kyle Busch	Joe Gibbs Racing	Toyota	325	43
8	7	41	Kurt Busch	Stewart–Haas Racing	Ford	325	41
9	8	42	Kyle Larson	Chip Ganassi Racing	Chevrolet	325	36
10	27	9	Chase Elliott	Hendrick Motorsports	Chevrolet	325	27
11	10	20	Erik Jones	Joe Gibbs Racing	Toyota	325	26
12	26	12	Ryan Blaney	Team Penske	Ford	325	25
13	11	10	Aric Almirola	Stewart–Haas Racing	Ford	325	33
14	25	3	Austin Dillon	Richard Childress Racing	Chevrolet	324	23
15	4	19	Daniel Suárez	Joe Gibbs Racing	Toyota	324	23
16	6	17	Ricky Stenhouse Jr.	Roush Fenway Racing	Ford	324	21
17	15	21	Paul Menard	Wood Brothers Racing	Ford	324	20
18	23	24	William Byron (R)	Hendrick Motorsports	Chevrolet	323	19
19	13	1	Jamie McMurray	Chip Ganassi Racing	Chevrolet	323	18
20	18	88	Alex Bowman	Hendrick Motorsports	Chevrolet	322	17
21	14	95	Kasey Kahne	Leavine Family Racing	Chevrolet	322	16
22	2	31	Ryan Newman	Richard Childress Racing	Chevrolet	322	15
23	29	38	David Ragan	Front Row Motorsports	Ford	321	14
24	17	34	Michael McDowell	Front Row Motorsports	Ford	321	13
25	24	37	Chris Buescher	JTG Daugherty Racing	Chevrolet	321	12
26	28	13	Ty Dillon	Germain Racing	Chevrolet	321	11
27	22	48	Jimmie Johnson	Hendrick Motorsports	Chevrolet	321	10
28	32	72	Cole Whitt	TriStar Motorsports	Chevrolet	320	9
29	21	47	A. J. Allmendinger	JTG Daugherty Racing	Chevrolet	320	8
30	34	15	Ross Chastain (i)	Premium Motorsports	Chevrolet	319	0
31	30	32	Matt DiBenedetto	Go Fas Racing	Ford	319	6
32	19	43	Bubba Wallace (R)	Richard Petty Motorsports	Chevrolet	319	5
33	36	51	Harrison Rhodes	Rick Ware Racing	Chevrolet	310	4
34	33	00	Jeffrey Earnhardt	StarCom Racing	Chevrolet	305	3
35	20	6	Trevor Bayne	Roush Fenway Racing	Ford	292	2
36	31	23	Gray Gaulding	BK Racing	Toyota	99	1
Official race results

=== Race statistics ===
- 24 lead changes among 8 drivers
- 5 cautions for 28 laps
- Time of race: 3 hours, 29 minutes and 54 seconds
- Average speed: 143.071 miles per hour (230.250 km/h)
- Margin of victory: 2.690 seconds

== Media ==
=== Television ===
The Folds of Honor QuikTrip 500 was carried by Fox in the United States. Mike Joy, five-time Atlanta winner Jeff Gordon and three-time Atlanta winner Darrell Waltrip worked the race from the booth. Pit road was manned by Jamie Little, Vince Welch and Matt Yocum.

Fox
Booth announcers	Pit reporters
Lap-by-lap: Mike Joy; Color commentator: Jeff Gordon; Color commentator: Darrell Waltrip	Jamie Little; Vince Welch; Matt Yocum

=== Radio ===
The race was broadcast on radio by the Performance Racing Network and simulcast on Sirius XM NASCAR Radio. Doug Rice, Mark Garrow and Wendy Venturini called the race from the booth when the field raced down the front stretch. Rob Albright called the race from atop a billboard outside of turn 2 when the field raced through turns 1 and 2. Pat Patterson called the race from a billboard outside of turn 3 when the field raced through turns 3 and 4. On pit road, PRN was manned by Brad Gillie, Brett McMillan, Jim Noble and Doug Turnbull.

PRN
Booth announcers	Turn announcers	Pit reporters
Lead announcer: Doug Rice; Announcer: Mark Garrow; Announcer: Wendy Venturini	Turns 1 & 2: Rob Albright; Turns 3 & 4: Pat Patterson	Brad Gillie; Brett McMillan; Jim Noble; Doug Turnbull

== Standings after the race ==
Drivers' Championship standings

	Pos	Driver	Points
3	1	Joey Logano	89
1	2	Ryan Blaney	83 (–6)
4	3	Denny Hamlin	77 (–12)
15	4	Kevin Harvick	75 (–14)
10	5	Clint Bowyer	74 (–15)
4	6	Austin Dillon	70 (–19)
5	7	Martin Truex Jr.	69 (–20)
8	8	Kurt Busch	68 (–21)
6	9	Paul Menard	66 (–23)
2	10	Aric Almirola	66 (–23)
10	11	Kyle Busch	61 (–28)
20	12	Brad Keselowski	58 (–31)
7	13	Kyle Larson	54 (–35)
9	14	Bubba Wallace	52 (–37)
9	15	Michael McDowell	52 (–37)
5	16	Ryan Newman	49 (–40)
Official driver's standings

Manufacturers' Championship standings

	Pos	Manufacturer	Points
2	1	Ford	73
1	2	Chevrolet	68 (–5)
1	3	Toyota	67 (–6)
Official manufacturers' standings

- Note: Only the first 16 positions are included for the driver standings.

Previous race: 2018 Daytona 500	Monster Energy NASCAR Cup Series; 2018 season	Next race: 2018 Pennzoil 400
