= 2018 Pennzoil 400 =

Race details
- Race 3 of 36 in the 2018 Monster Energy NASCAR Cup Series
- The 2018 Pennzoil 400 program cover.
- Date: March 4, 2018
- Location: Las Vegas Motor Speedway in Las Vegas
- Course: Permanent racing facility
- Course length: 1.5 miles (2.4 km)
- Distance: 267 laps, 400.5 mi (640.8 km)
- Average speed: 141.756 miles per hour (228.134 km/h)

Pole position
Driver	Ryan Blaney	Team Penske
- Time: 28.200

Most laps led
Driver	Kevin Harvick	Stewart–Haas Racing
- Laps: 214

Winner
No. 4	Kevin Harvick	Stewart–Haas Racing

Television in the United States
- Network: Fox
- Announcers: Mike Joy, Jeff Gordon and Darrell Waltrip
- Nielsen ratings: 2.9/2.8 (Overnight)

Radio in the United States
- Radio: PRN
- Booth announcers: Doug Rice, Mark Garrow and Wendy Venturini
- Turn announcers: Rob Albright (1 & 2) and Pat Patterson (3 & 4)

The 2018 Pennzoil 400 was a Monster Energy NASCAR Cup Series race held on March 4, 2018, at Las Vegas Motor Speedway in Las Vegas. Contested over 267 laps on the 1.5 mi (2.4 km) asphalt intermediate speedway, it was the third race of the 2018 Monster Energy NASCAR Cup Series season.

== Entry list ==
No.	Driver	Team	Manufacturer
00	Jeffrey Earnhardt	StarCom Racing	Chevrolet
1	Jamie McMurray	Chip Ganassi Racing	Chevrolet
2	Brad Keselowski	Team Penske	Ford
3	Austin Dillon	Richard Childress Racing	Chevrolet
4	Kevin Harvick	Stewart–Haas Racing	Ford
6	Trevor Bayne	Roush Fenway Racing	Ford
9	Chase Elliott	Hendrick Motorsports	Chevrolet
10	Aric Almirola	Stewart–Haas Racing	Ford
11	Denny Hamlin	Joe Gibbs Racing	Toyota
12	Ryan Blaney	Team Penske	Ford
13	Ty Dillon	Germain Racing	Chevrolet
14	Clint Bowyer	Stewart–Haas Racing	Ford
15	Ross Chastain (i)	Premium Motorsports	Chevrolet
17	Ricky Stenhouse Jr.	Roush Fenway Racing	Ford
18	Kyle Busch	Joe Gibbs Racing	Toyota
19	Daniel Suárez	Joe Gibbs Racing	Toyota
20	Erik Jones	Joe Gibbs Racing	Toyota
21	Paul Menard	Wood Brothers Racing	Ford
22	Joey Logano	Team Penske	Ford
23	Gray Gaulding	BK Racing	Toyota
24	William Byron (R)	Hendrick Motorsports	Chevrolet
31	Ryan Newman	Richard Childress Racing	Chevrolet
32	Matt DiBenedetto	Go Fas Racing	Ford
34	Michael McDowell	Front Row Motorsports	Ford
37	Chris Buescher	JTG Daugherty Racing	Chevrolet
38	David Ragan	Front Row Motorsports	Ford
41	Kurt Busch	Stewart–Haas Racing	Ford
42	Kyle Larson	Chip Ganassi Racing	Chevrolet
43	Bubba Wallace (R)	Richard Petty Motorsports	Chevrolet
47	A. J. Allmendinger	JTG Daugherty Racing	Chevrolet
48	Jimmie Johnson	Hendrick Motorsports	Chevrolet
51	Cole Custer (i)	Rick Ware Racing	Ford
55	Joey Gase (i)	Premium Motorsports	Chevrolet
72	Cole Whitt	TriStar Motorsports	Chevrolet
78	Martin Truex Jr.	Furniture Row Racing	Toyota
88	Alex Bowman	Hendrick Motorsports	Chevrolet
95	Kasey Kahne	Leavine Family Racing	Chevrolet
Official entry list

== First practice ==
Kyle Larson was the fastest in the first practice session with a time of 28.323 seconds and a speed of 190.658 mph (306.834 km/h).

Pos	No.	Driver	Team	Manufacturer	Time	Speed
1	42	Kyle Larson	Chip Ganassi Racing	Chevrolet	28.323	190.658
2	4	Kevin Harvick	Stewart–Haas Racing	Ford	28.360	190.409
3	21	Paul Menard	Wood Brothers Racing	Ford	28.366	190.369
Official first practice results

== Qualifying ==
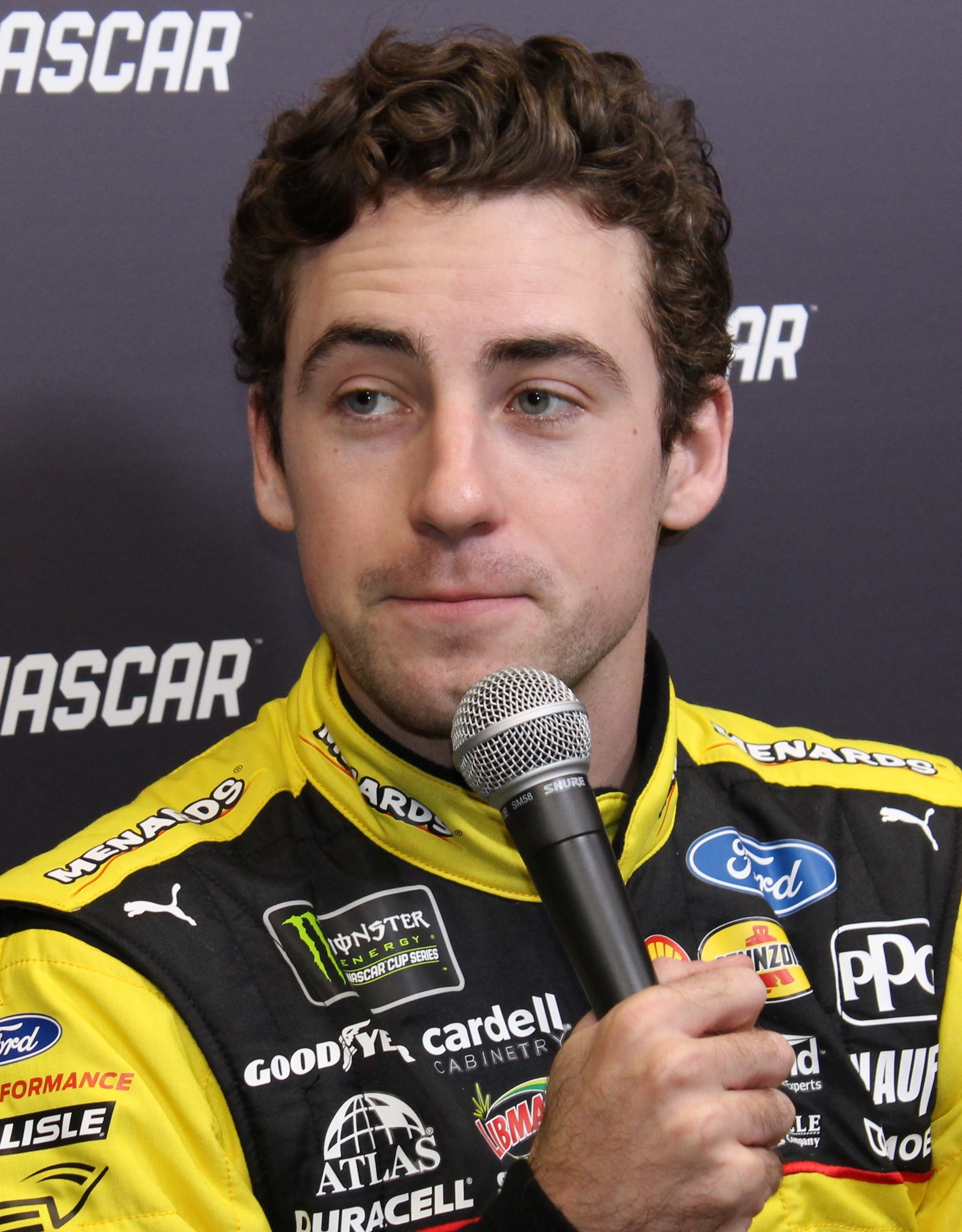
Ryan Blaney scored the pole position.

Ryan Blaney scored the pole for the race with a time of 28.200 and a speed of 191.489 mph (308.172 km/h).

=== Qualifying results ===
Pos	No.	Driver	Team	Manufacturer	R1	R2	R3
1	12	Ryan Blaney	Team Penske	Ford	28.419	28.271	28.200
2	4	Kevin Harvick	Stewart–Haas Racing	Ford	28.540	28.259	28.384
3	41	Kurt Busch	Stewart–Haas Racing	Ford	28.569	28.579	28.411
4	78	Martin Truex Jr.	Furniture Row Racing	Toyota	28.515	28.476	28.424
5	42	Kyle Larson	Chip Ganassi Racing	Chevrolet	28.570	28.539	28.504
6	9	Chase Elliott	Hendrick Motorsports	Chevrolet	28.422	28.515	28.545
7	17	Ricky Stenhouse Jr.	Roush Fenway Racing	Ford	28.477	28.515	28.549
8	2	Brad Keselowski	Team Penske	Ford	28.396	28.530	28.556
9	20	Erik Jones	Joe Gibbs Racing	Toyota	28.510	28.355	28.614
10	22	Joey Logano	Team Penske	Ford	28.644	28.447	28.626
11	14	Clint Bowyer	Stewart–Haas Racing	Ford	28.545	28.533	28.652
12	21	Paul Menard	Wood Brothers Racing	Ford	28.394	28.571	28.656
13	18	Kyle Busch	Joe Gibbs Racing	Toyota	28.505	28.596	—
14	48	Jimmie Johnson	Hendrick Motorsports	Chevrolet	28.551	28.615	—
15	34	Michael McDowell	Front Row Motorsports	Ford	28.634	28.631	—
16	3	Austin Dillon	Richard Childress Racing	Chevrolet	28.706	28.656	—
17	24	William Byron (R)	Hendrick Motorsports	Chevrolet	28.421	28.668	—
18	19	Daniel Suárez	Joe Gibbs Racing	Toyota	28.427	28.744	—
19	11	Denny Hamlin	Joe Gibbs Racing	Toyota	28.534	28.747	—
20	88	Alex Bowman	Hendrick Motorsports	Chevrolet	28.660	28.809	—
21	95	Kasey Kahne	Leavine Family Racing	Chevrolet	28.705	28.830	—
22	1	Jamie McMurray	Chip Ganassi Racing	Chevrolet	28.703	28.839	—
23	38	David Ragan	Front Row Motorsports	Ford	28.578	28.852	—
24	6	Trevor Bayne	Roush Fenway Racing	Ford	28.693	28.968	—
25	31	Ryan Newman	Richard Childress Racing	Chevrolet	28.777	—	—
26	43	Bubba Wallace (R)	Richard Petty Motorsports	Chevrolet	28.793	—	—
27	47	A. J. Allmendinger	JTG Daugherty Racing	Chevrolet	28.890	—	—
28	37	Chris Buescher	JTG Daugherty Racing	Chevrolet	28.980	—	—
29	10	Aric Almirola	Stewart–Haas Racing	Ford	29.013	—	—
30	51	Cole Custer (i)	Rick Ware Racing	Ford	29.035	—	—
31	13	Ty Dillon	Germain Racing	Chevrolet	29.140	—	—
32	32	Matt DiBenedetto	Go Fas Racing	Ford	29.185	—	—
33	15	Ross Chastain (i)	Premium Motorsports	Chevrolet	29.441	—	—
34	72	Cole Whitt	TriStar Motorsports	Chevrolet	29.626	—	—
35	23	Gray Gaulding	BK Racing	Toyota	30.127	—	—
36	00	Jeffrey Earnhardt	StarCom Racing	Chevrolet	30.631	—	—
37	55	Joey Gase (i)	Premium Motorsports	Chevrolet	31.101	—	—
Official qualifying results

== Practice (post-qualifying) ==
=== Second practice ===
Kyle Larson was the fastest in the second practice session with a time of 28.791 seconds and a speed of 187.559 mph (301.847 km/h).

Pos	No.	Driver	Team	Manufacturer	Time	Speed
1	42	Kyle Larson	Chip Ganassi Racing	Chevrolet	28.791	187.559
2	31	Ryan Newman	Richard Childress Racing	Chevrolet	28.807	187.454
3	48	Jimmie Johnson	Hendrick Motorsports	Chevrolet	28.941	186.587
Official second practice results

=== Final practice ===
Ryan Blaney was the fastest in the final practice session with a time of 28.963 seconds and a speed of 186.445 mph (300.054 km/h).

Pos	No.	Driver	Team	Manufacturer	Time	Speed
1	12	Ryan Blaney	Team Penske	Ford	28.963	186.445
2	42	Kyle Larson	Chip Ganassi Racing	Chevrolet	29.011	186.136
3	78	Martin Truex Jr.	Furniture Row Racing	Toyota	29.018	186.091
Official final practice results

== Race result ==
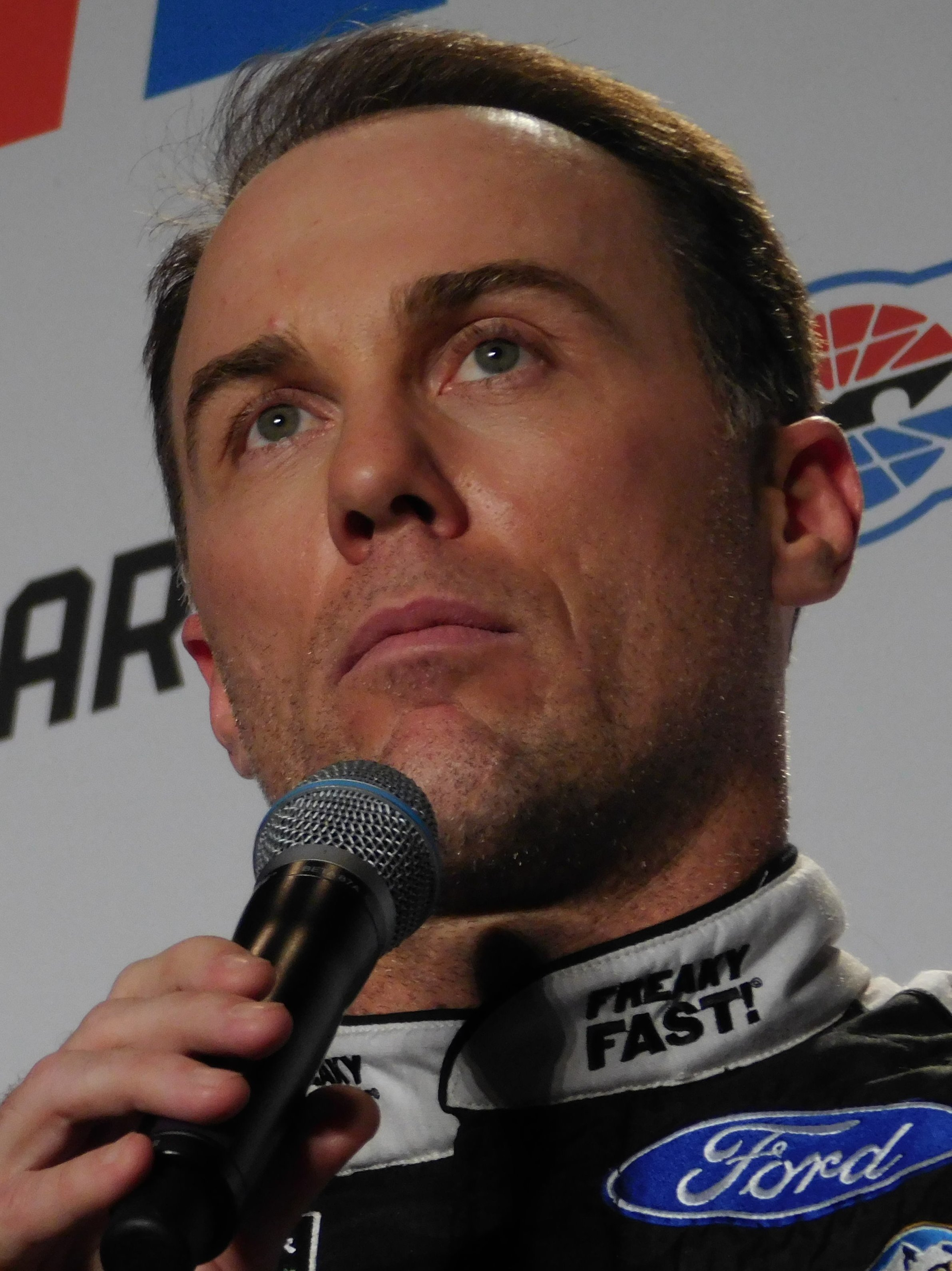
Kevin Harvick swept all three stages and won the race, but failed post-race inspection.

=== Stage Results ===
Stage 1 Laps: 80

Pos	No	Driver	Team	Manufacturer	Points
1	4	Kevin Harvick	Stewart–Haas Racing	Ford	10
2	78	Martin Truex Jr.	Furniture Row Racing	Toyota	9
3	42	Kyle Larson	Chip Ganassi Racing	Chevrolet	8
4	12	Ryan Blaney	Team Penske	Ford	7
5	22	Joey Logano	Team Penske	Ford	6
6	2	Brad Keselowski	Team Penske	Ford	5
7	41	Kurt Busch	Stewart–Haas Racing	Ford	4
8	9	Chase Elliott	Hendrick Motorsports	Chevrolet	3
9	18	Kyle Busch	Joe Gibbs Racing	Toyota	2
10	21	Paul Menard	Wood Brothers Racing	Ford	1
Official stage one results

Stage 2 Laps: 80

Pos	No	Driver	Team	Manufacturer	Points
1	4	Kevin Harvick	Stewart–Haas Racing	Ford	10
2	12	Ryan Blaney	Team Penske	Ford	9
3	42	Kyle Larson	Chip Ganassi Racing	Chevrolet	8
4	22	Joey Logano	Team Penske	Ford	7
5	18	Kyle Busch	Joe Gibbs Racing	Toyota	6
6	2	Brad Keselowski	Team Penske	Ford	5
7	78	Martin Truex Jr.	Furniture Row Racing	Toyota	4
8	41	Kurt Busch	Stewart–Haas Racing	Ford	3
9	9	Chase Elliott	Hendrick Motorsports	Chevrolet	2
10	21	Paul Menard	Wood Brothers Racing	Ford	1
Official stage two results

=== Final Stage Results ===
Stage 3 Laps: 107

Pos	Grid	No	Driver	Team	Manufacturer	Laps	Points
1	2	4	Kevin Harvick	Stewart–Haas Racing	Ford	267	40 (Note: Kevin Harvick was penalized 20 points after failing post-race inspection.)
2	13	18	Kyle Busch	Joe Gibbs Racing	Toyota	267	43
3	5	42	Kyle Larson	Chip Ganassi Racing	Chevrolet	267	50
4	4	78	Martin Truex Jr.	Furniture Row Racing	Toyota	267	46
5	1	12	Ryan Blaney	Team Penske	Ford	267	48
6	8	2	Brad Keselowski	Team Penske	Ford	267	41
7	10	22	Joey Logano	Team Penske	Ford	267	43
8	9	20	Erik Jones	Joe Gibbs Racing	Toyota	267	29
9	12	21	Paul Menard	Wood Brothers Racing	Ford	267	30
10	29	10	Aric Almirola	Stewart–Haas Racing	Ford	266	27
11	25	31	Ryan Newman	Richard Childress Racing	Chevrolet	266	26
12	14	48	Jimmie Johnson	Hendrick Motorsports	Chevrolet	266	25
13	16	3	Austin Dillon	Richard Childress Racing	Chevrolet	266	24
14	7	17	Ricky Stenhouse Jr.	Roush Fenway Racing	Ford	265	23
15	28	37	Chris Buescher	JTG Daugherty Racing	Chevrolet	265	22
16	20	88	Alex Bowman	Hendrick Motorsports	Chevrolet	265	21
17	19	11	Denny Hamlin	Joe Gibbs Racing	Toyota	265	20
18	11	14	Clint Bowyer	Stewart–Haas Racing	Ford	265	19
19	21	95	Kasey Kahne	Leavine Family Racing	Chevrolet	264	18
20	24	6	Trevor Bayne	Roush Fenway Racing	Ford	264	17
21	26	43	Bubba Wallace (R)	Richard Petty Motorsports	Chevrolet	264	16
22	32	32	Matt DiBenedetto	Go Fas Racing	Ford	264	15
23	23	38	David Ragan	Front Row Motorsports	Ford	264	14
24	31	13	Ty Dillon	Germain Racing	Chevrolet	264	13
25	30	51	Cole Custer (i)	Rick Ware Racing	Ford	264	0
26	18	19	Daniel Suárez	Joe Gibbs Racing	Toyota	263	11
27	17	24	William Byron (R)	Hendrick Motorsports	Chevrolet	263	10
28	34	72	Cole Whitt	TriStar Motorsports	Chevrolet	262	9
29	33	15	Ross Chastain (i)	Premium Motorsports	Chevrolet	262	0
30	27	47	A. J. Allmendinger	JTG Daugherty Racing	Chevrolet	262	7
31	36	00	Jeffrey Earnhardt	StarCom Racing	Chevrolet	255	6
32	37	55	Joey Gase (i)	Premium Motorsports	Chevrolet	253	0
33	35	23	Gray Gaulding	BK Racing	Toyota	195	4
34	6	9	Chase Elliott	Hendrick Motorsports	Chevrolet	183	8
35	3	41	Kurt Busch	Stewart–Haas Racing	Ford	183	9
36	22	1	Jamie McMurray	Chip Ganassi Racing	Chevrolet	176	1
37	15	34	Michael McDowell	Front Row Motorsports	Ford	100	1
Official race results

=== Race statistics ===
- 11 lead changes among 6 different drivers
- 4 cautions for 29 laps
- Time of race: 2 hours, 49 minutes and 31 seconds
- Average speed: 141.760 miles per hour (228.141 km/h)
- Margin of victory: 2.906 seconds

== Media ==
=== Television ===
Fox Sports covered their 18th race at the Las Vegas Motor Speedway. Mike Joy, 2001 race winner Jeff Gordon and Darrell Waltrip called from the booth for the race. Jamie Little, Vince Welch and Matt Yocum handled the pit road duties for the television side.

Fox
Booth announcers	Pit reporters
Lap-by-lap: Mike Joy; Color-commentator: Jeff Gordon; Color commentator: Darrell Waltrip	Jamie Little; Vince Welch; Matt Yocum

=== Radio ===
PRN covered the radio call for the race which was also simulcasted on Sirius XM NASCAR Radio. Doug Rice, Mark Garrow and Wendy Venturini called the race in the booth when the field raced through the tri-oval. Rob Albright called the race from a billboard in turn 2 when the field raced through turns 1 and 2. Pat Patterson called the race from a billboard outside of turn 3 when the field raced through turns 3 and 4. Brad Gillie, Brett McMillan, Jim Noble and Steve Richards worked pit road for the radio side.

PRN
Booth announcers	Turn announcers	Pit reporters
Lead announcer: Doug Rice; Announcer: Mark Garrow; Announcer: Wendy Venturini	Turns 1 & 2: Rob Albright; Turns 3 & 4: Pat Patterson	Brad Gillie; Brett McMillan; Jim Noble; Steve Richards

== Penalties ==
On March 7, 2018, NASCAR assessed the Stewart–Haas Racing No. 4 Ford an L1 penalty for violating sections 20.4.8.1 (dealing with rear window support) and 20.4.18 (rocker panel extensions). A brace that supports the rear window failed and did not meet specifications for keeping the rear window glass rigid in all directions, at all times. Additionally, the rocker panel extension was not aluminum. The team would be docked 20 driver and owner points, the win would not count toward playoffs, crew chief Rodney Childers was fined $50,000 and car chief Robert Smith would be suspended for the next two races. Additionally, the No. 55 team was penalized for a loose lug nut during inspection and crew chief Todd Parrott was fined $10,000.

== Standings after the race ==
Drivers' Championship standings

	Pos	Driver	Points
3	1	Kevin Harvick	135
1	2	Joey Logano	132 (–3)
1	3	Ryan Blaney	131 (–4)
3	4	Martin Truex Jr.	115 (–20)
6	5	Kyle Busch	104 (–31)
7	6	Kyle Larson	104 (–31)
5	7	Brad Keselowski	99 (–36)
5	8	Denny Hamlin	97 (–38)
	9	Paul Menard	96 (–39)
4	10	Austin Dillon	94 (–41)
6	11	Clint Bowyer	93 (–42)
2	12	Aric Almirola	93 (–42)
5	13	Kurt Busch	77 (–58)
2	14	Ryan Newman	75 (–60)
1	15	Bubba Wallace	68 (–67)
2	16	Chris Buescher	67 (–68)
Official driver's standings

Manufacturers' Championship standings

Pos	Manufacturer	Points
1	Ford	113
2	Chevrolet	102 (–11)
3	Toyota	102 (–11)
Official manufacturers' standings

- Note: Only the first 16 positions are included for the driver standings.

Previous race: 2018 Folds of Honor QuikTrip 500	Monster Energy NASCAR Cup Series; 2018 season	Next race: 2018 TicketGuardian 500
