= NASCAR operations of Team Penske =

NASCAR team

The NASCAR operation of the racing team Team Penske is a unit based in Mooresville, North Carolina, US. The team fields Ford Mustangs in the NASCAR Cup Series and has won a total of five drivers' championships and over 170 races over both Cup and Xfinity series.

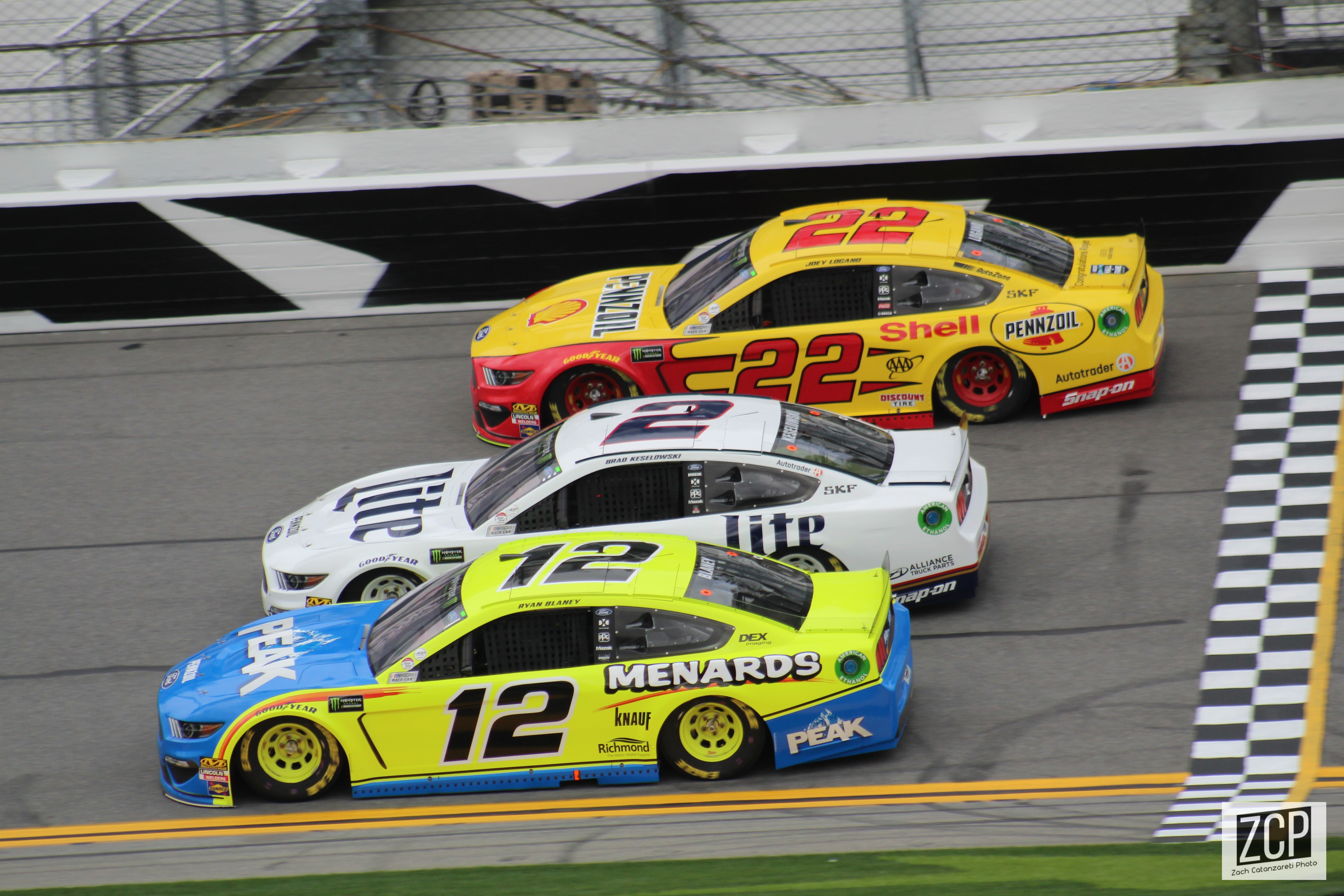
Penske's three cars, driven by Ryan Blaney, Brad Keselowski and Joey Logano at the 2019 Daytona 500

The team has also used the following names:

- Penske Racing South: formerly used to differentiate the NASCAR operation from its open-wheel and sports car racing operation that was based in Reading, Pennsylvania; the name ceased to be used when the entire operation moved to North Carolina.
- Penske-Kranefuss Racing: used from 1998 until 2001 when Michael Kranefuss, who had previously fielded a car with Carl Haas as a partner, merged his team with Penske's and brought Jeremy Mayfield, his driver, into the Penske fold in car No. 12. The partnership ended after 2001, but Penske continues to run car No. 12 to this day.
- Penske-Jasper Racing: used in 2004 and 2005. Roger Penske had been supplying Jasper Motorsports with engines for several years and bought a share of the team so he could run its No. 77 for Brendan Gaughan as part of the Penske team. The partnership dissolved after Penske gave up his stake in the team and fired Gaughan.

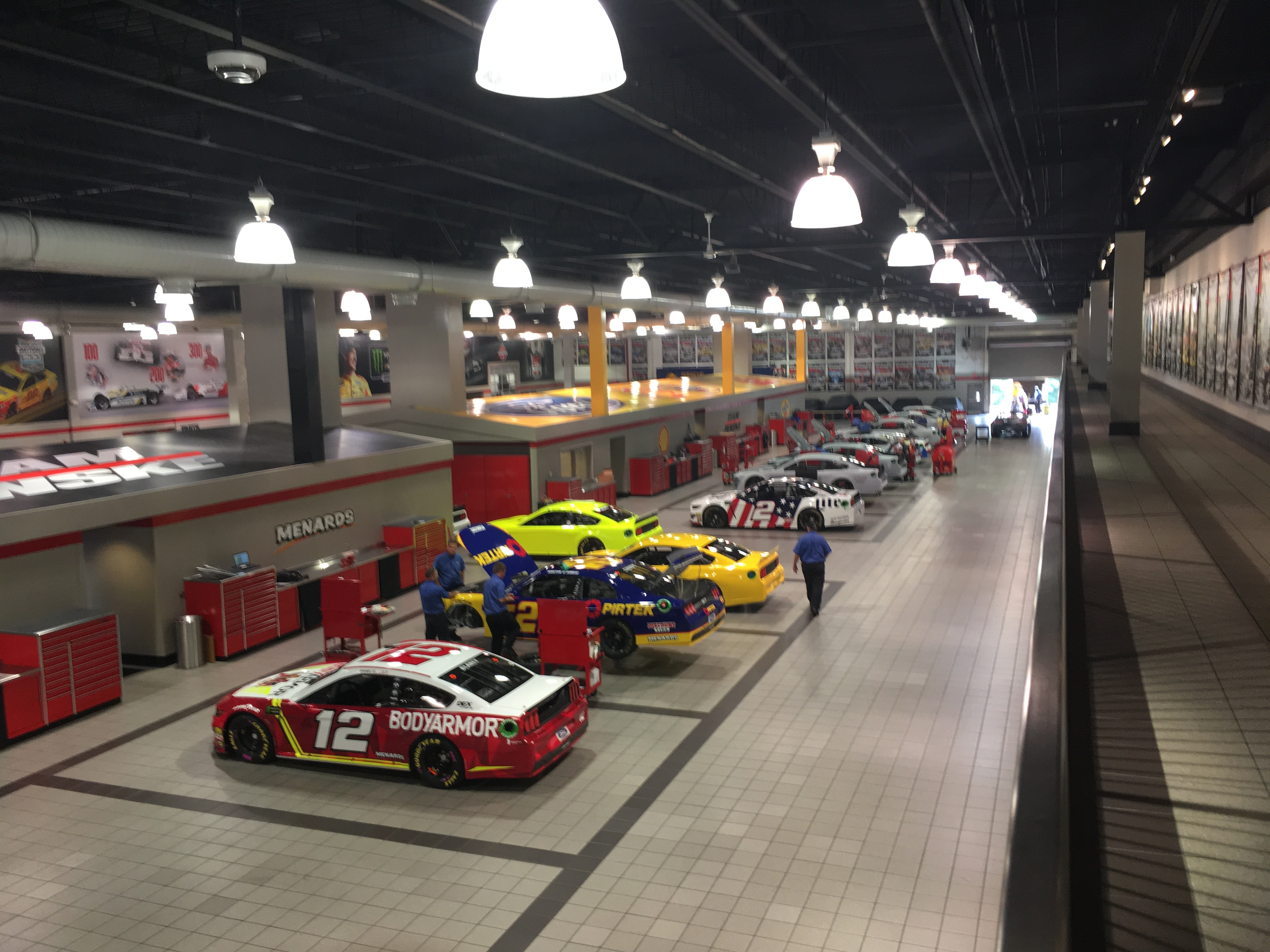
Penske's NASCAR Garage in Mooresville, North Carolina.

== Background ==
The team debuted in 1972 at Riverside International Raceway. Mark Donohue was driving a factory-sponsored red-white-blue American Motors Matador. It was dubbed the "flying brick" by many noting its squarish aerodynamics. The car finished 39th after rear-end problems. The team ran part-time for a few years, fielding cars for several drivers including Donohue (won the 1973 Western 500 in the No. 16 Matador), Dave Marcis, Donnie Allison, and Bobby Allison. The team went full-time with Bobby Allison in 1976 with a new, more aerodynamic fastback coupe, finishing 4th in the points. In 1980, the team fielded two races for Rusty Wallace, finishing 2nd in his first race at Atlanta. Penske sold his machinery to the Elliott family in 1977 and got out of NASCAR.

The team did not run for eleven years, returning in 1991 with Wallace at the wheel again, with Rusty moving his Miller beer sponsorship to the new team from the recently suspended operations of Raymond Beadle's Blue Max Racing team. Penske Racing South fielded Pontiacs from 1991 to 1993, when it switch to full-works Ford in 1994. In 2003, the team switched to full-works then-DaimlerChrysler-owned Dodge and thus earned factory support. In 2008, Penske Racing won its first Daytona 500 with Ryan Newman. By 2011, however, Penske was the only NASCAR Cup Series team running Dodges full-time as most of the former Dodge teams had either folded or switched to other manufacturers. Owner Roger Penske announced on March 1, 2012, that the team would return to full-works Ford in 2013. In addition, Penske would receive the engine package from Roush Yates Engines as well as the same treatment as Roush Fenway Racing, Wood Brothers Racing and the rest of Ford teams due to the Ford partnership. During the 2012 season, Brad Keselowski brought home Penske's first Cup Series title.

In 2014, the team changed their name branding from "Penske Racing" to "Team Penske" to match their IndyCar name.

For the 2016 season, Team Penske fielded the No. 2 for Keselowski and the No. 22 for Joey Logano. The team also started fielding cars to the historic NASCAR team Wood Brothers Racing. In 2018, Team Penske added the No. 12 for Ryan Blaney. That year, Logano won Penske its second Cup Series title.

Keselowski left Team Penske at the end of the 2021 season to become driver-owner of RFK Racing. He was replaced by Austin Cindric, who won the 2022 Daytona 500. Joey Logano kicked off the first of three straight Cup Series championships that year, with Ryan Blaney winning in 2023 and Logano again in 2024.

=== 1972–1980 results ===
NASCAR Winston Cup Series results
| Year | Driver | No. | Make | 1 | 2 | 3 | 4 | 5 | 6 | 7 | 8 | 9 | 10 | 11 | 12 | 13 | 14 | 15 | 16 | 17 | 18 | 19 | 20 | 21 | 22 | 23 | 24 | 25 | 26 | 27 | 28 | 29 | 30 | 31 | NWCC | Pts | Ref |
|---|---|---|---|---|---|---|---|---|---|---|---|---|---|---|---|---|---|---|---|---|---|---|---|---|---|---|---|---|---|---|---|---|---|---|---|---|---|
| 1972 | Mark Donohue | 16 | AMC | RSD; 39 | DAY; 35 | RCH | ONT; 44 | CAR | ATL; 15 | BRI | DAR | NWS | MAR | TAL | | | | | | | | | | | | | | | | | | | | | – | – | – |
| 1972 | Dave Marcis | 16 | AMC | | | | | | | | | | | | CLT; 31 | DOV | MCH | | | | | | | | | | DAR; 7 | RCH | DOV; 37 | MAR; 29 | NWS | CLT; 26 | CAR; 7 | TWS | – | – | – |
| 1972 | Dave Marcis | 2 | AMC | | | | | | | | | | | | | | | | | | | | | | MCH; 9 | NSV | | | | | | | | | – | – | – |
| 1972 | Donnie Allison | 16 | AMC | | | | | | | | | | | | | | | RSD; 3 | TWS | DAY | BRI | TRN | ATL | TAL | | | | | | | | | | | – | – | |
| 1973 | Mark Donohue | 16 | AMC | RSD; 1* | | | | | ATL; 30 | NWS | DAR | | | | | | | | | | | | | | | | | | | | | | | | – | – | – |
| 1973 | Dave Marcis | 2 | AMC | | DAY; 27 | RCH | CAR; 37 | BRI | | | | MAR; 26 | TAL | NSV | CLT; 28 | DOV; 8 | TWS; 33 | RSD | MCH | DAY | BRI; 28 | ATL | TAL | NSV | DAR | RCH | DOV | NWS | MAR | CLT | CAR; 5 | | | | – | – | – |
| 1974 | Gary Bettenhausen | 16 | AMC | RSD; 7 | DAY; 12 | RCH | CAR | BRI | ATL; 9 | | | | TAL; 37 | NSV | DOV | CLT | | MCH; 4 | | | | | | | | | | | | | | | | | – | – | – |
| 1974 | Dave Marcis | 16 | AMC | | | | | | | DAR; 6 | NWS | MAR | | | | | | | | | | | | | | | | | | | | | | | – | – | – |
| 1974 | George Follmer | 16 | AMC | | | | | | | | | | | | | | RSD; 33 | | | | | | | | | | | | | | | | | | – | – | – |
| 1974 | Bobby Allison | 16 | AMC | | | | | | | | | | | | | | | | DAY; 5* | BRI | NSV | ATL | POC | TAL | | | | | | | | | | | – | – | – |
| 1974 | Bobby Allison | 12 | AMC | | | | | | | | | | | | | | | | | | | | | | MCH; 5 | DAR; 30 | RCH | DOV; 13 | NWS | MAR | CLT; 5 | CAR; 4 | ONT; 1 | | – | – | – |
| 1975 | Bobby Allison | 16 | AMC | RSD; 1* | DAY; 2 | RCH | CAR | BRI | ATL; 30 | NWS | DAR; 1 | MAR; 4 | TAL; 35 | NSV | DOV | CLT | RSD; 2* | MCH; 22 | DAY; 35 | NSV | POC; 31 | TAL; 29 | MCH; 4 | DAR; 1 | DOV; 28 | NWS | MAR; 3 | CLT; 31 | RCH | CAR; 2 | BRI | ATL; 26 | ONT; 5 | | 24th | 2181 | |
| 1976 | Bobby Allison | 2 | AMC | RSD; 15 | | | | | | | | | | | | | | | | | | | | | | | | | | | | | | | 4th | 4097 | |
| 1976 | Bobby Allison | 2 | Mercury | | DAY; 25 | CAR; 21 | RCH; 3 | BRI; 5 | ATL; 29 | NWS; 3 | DAR; 18 | MAR; 6 | TAL; 3 | NSV; 5 | DOV; 4 | CLT; 4 | RSD; 2 | MCH; 3 | DAY; 3 | NSV; 7 | POC; 24 | TAL; 23 | MCH; 4 | BRI; 6 | DAR; 9 | RCH; 2 | DOV; 4 | MAR; 27 | NWS; 29 | CLT; 3 | CAR; 4 | ATL; 26 | ONT; 33 | | 4th | 4097 | |
| 1977 | Dave Marcis | 2 | Chevy | RSD; 4 | | RCH; 4 | CAR; 24 | ATL; 6 | NWS | DAR; 6 | BRI | MAR | | NSV; 4 | DOV | | | MCH; 4 | DAY | NSV | POC | TAL | MCH; 22 | BRI | DAR | RCH | DOV | MAR | NWS | CLT; 23 | CAR | ATL | ONT | | – | – | – |
| 1977 | Dave Marcis | 2 | Mercury | | DAY; 28 | | | | | | | | TAL; 5 | | | CLT; 36 | RSD | | | | | | | | | | | | | | | | | | – | – | – |
| 1980 | Rusty Wallace | 16 | Chevy | RSD | DAY | RCH | CAR | ATL; 2 | BRI | DAR | NWS | MAR | TAL | NSV | DOV | CLT | TWS | RSD | MCH | DAY | NSV | POC | TAL | MCH | BRI | DAR | RCH | DOV | NWS | MAR | CLT; 14 | CAR | ATL | ONT | 57th | 291 | |

== Cup Series ==
=== Car No. 02 history ===
Ryan Newman (2000–2001)

Penske's No. 02 team originally began running in the ARCA RE/MAX Series in 2000 as the No. 27 Ford sponsored by Alltel and driven by Ryan Newman. Later in the year, the team made its NASCAR Cup Series debut with Newman at Phoenix as the No. 02 Alltel Ford, finishing 41st due to engine failure. In 2001, Newman split time between ARCA, the NASCAR Busch Series, and the NASCAR Cup Series. He drove in 15 Busch races and won at Michigan. In the Cup Series, he participated in seven events, and almost won The Winston Open before his engine expired in the closing laps. He put together two top-five finishes, which included a second-place finish at Kansas, and a pole in his abbreviated schedule.

==== Car No. 02 results ====
| Year | Driver | No. | Make | 1 | 2 | 3 | 4 | 5 | 6 | 7 | 8 | 9 | 10 | 11 | 12 | 13 | 14 | 15 | 16 | 17 | 18 | 19 | 20 | 21 | 22 | 23 | 24 | 25 | 26 | 27 | 28 | 29 | 30 | 31 | 32 | 33 | 34 | 35 | 36 | Owners | Pts |
|---|---|---|---|---|---|---|---|---|---|---|---|---|---|---|---|---|---|---|---|---|---|---|---|---|---|---|---|---|---|---|---|---|---|---|---|---|---|---|---|---|---|
| 2000 | Ryan Newman | 02 | Ford | DAY | CAR | LVS | ATL | DAR | BRI | TEX | MAR | TAL | CAL | RCH | CLT | DOV | MCH | POC | SON | DAY | NHA | POC | IND | GLN | MCH | BRI | DAR | RCH | NHA | DOV | MAR | CLT | TAL | CAR | PHO; 41 | HOM | ATL | | | 70th | 40 |
| 2001 | Ryan Newman | 02 | Ford | DAY | CAR | LVS; 33 | ATL | DAR | BRI | TEX | MAR | TAL | CAL | RCH | CLT; 43 | DOV | MCH; 5 | POC | SON | DAY | CHI | NHA | POC | IND; 31 | GLN | MCH | BRI | DAR | RCH | DOV | KAN; 2 | CLT; 19 | MAR | TAL | PHO; 40 | CAR | HOM | ATL | NHA | 49th | 497 |

=== Car No. 06 history ===
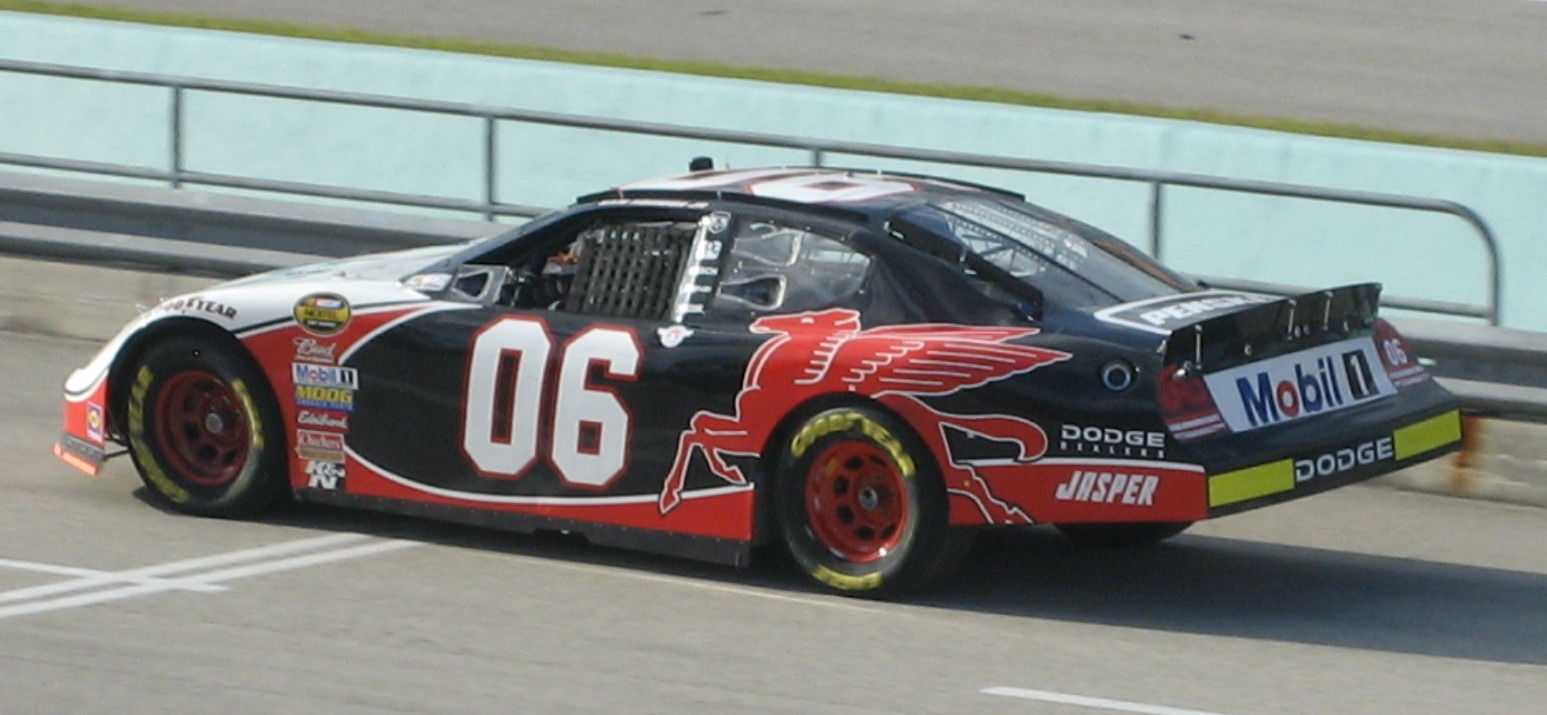
Sam Hornish Jr. in the No. 06 at the 2007 Ford 400

Part-time (2004, 2007)

In 2004, Penske occasionally ran a fourth car numbered 06, sponsored by Mobil 1. Craftsman Truck Series driver Travis Kvapil attempted four races, failing to qualify at Darlington, with a best finish of 21st at Martinsville. He would replace Brendan Gaughan in the 77 in 2005. Chad Blount also ran the car at Talladega, finishing 41st.

The No. 06 returned in 2007 with Sam Hornish Jr. in preparation for moving full-time in the 77 the next year. The No. 06 was sponsored by Penske Truck Rental and Mobil 1 Hornish Jr. attempted eight races, but only qualified for the final two races of the season, with a best finish of 30th at Phoenix.

==== Car No. 06 results ====
| Year | Driver | No. | Make | 1 | 2 | 3 | 4 | 5 | 6 | 7 | 8 | 9 | 10 | 11 | 12 | 13 | 14 | 15 | 16 | 17 | 18 | 19 | 20 | 21 | 22 | 23 | 24 | 25 | 26 | 27 | 28 | 29 | 30 | 31 | 32 | 33 | 34 | 35 | 36 | Owners | Pts |
|---|---|---|---|---|---|---|---|---|---|---|---|---|---|---|---|---|---|---|---|---|---|---|---|---|---|---|---|---|---|---|---|---|---|---|---|---|---|---|---|---|---|
| 2004 | Chad Blount | 06 | Dodge | DAY | CAR | LVS | ATL | DAR | BRI | TEX | MAR | TAL | CAL | RCH | CLT | DOV | POC | MCH | SON | DAY | CHI | NHA | POC | IND | GLN | MCH | BRI | CAL | RCH | NHA | DOV | TAL; 41 | KAN | CLT | | | | | | 63rd | 213 |
| 2004 | Travis Kvapil | 06 | Dodge | | | | | | | | | | | | | | | | | | | | | | | | | | | | | | | | MAR; 21 | ATL; 32 | PHO | DAR; DNQ | HOM; 39 | 63rd | 213 |
| 2007 | Sam Hornish Jr. | 06 | Dodge | DAY | CAL | LVS | ATL | BRI | MAR | TEX | PHO | TAL | RCH | DAR | CLT | DOV | POC | MCH | SON | NHA | DAY | CHI | IND | POC | GLN | MCH | BRI | CAL | RCH | NHA; DNQ | DOV; DNQ | KAN | TAL; DNQ | CLT; DNQ | MAR; DNQ | ATL; DNQ | TEX | PHO; 30 | HOM; 37 | 62nd | 125 |

=== Car No. 2 history ===
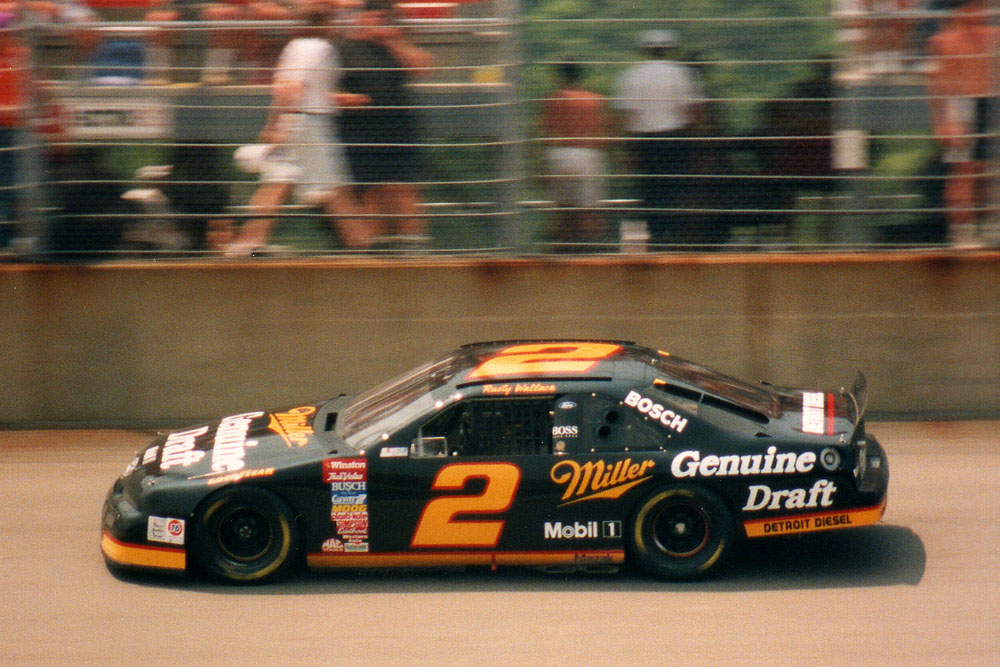
Rusty Wallace's black Miller scheme in 1994

Origins with Blue Max Racing (1983–1990)

The No. 2 car's history can be traced back to the late 1970s with M. C. Anderson and Benny Parsons. Bobby Allison drove two and a half seasons for Penske, winning four races for the team with a best standing of 4th. Cale Yarborough drove the 27 Valvoline car in 1981 and 1982 respectively. In 1983, the team switched hands to Raymond Beadle and Blue Max Racing with Tim Richmond driving. The team picked up Rusty Wallace in 1986 and won a Championship in 1989. In 1990, the team barely made it through the season with the help of Roger Penske funding the team to keep going. By late-1990, the team was purchased as a base for Roger's new team. During the offseason, the team changed numbers from 27 to 2 (Wallace's old racing number) and kept the Miller Sponsorship.

Rusty Wallace (1991–2005)

The No. 2 team has not seen many changes since its debut under the Penske banner at the 1991 Daytona 500, where it finished 27th after a crash late in the race. Wallace drove the car from 1991 to 2005, with some form of Miller Beer as the primary sponsor of the team. Wallace moved to Penske from Blue Max Racing, which suspended operations after 1990. The team in its first year won two races and finished 10th in points. In 1992, Wallace won one race and finished 13th in points. Things then turned around for him and Penske, winning 25 races over the next four years, despite never winning the championship.

The team switched from Pontiac to Ford in 1994. The season finale at Atlanta Motor Speedway and the entire 1996 season saw a small change when the popular Miller Genuine Draft paint scheme was replaced with a red, blue and yellow splashed scheme that advertised the Miller brand. After winning five races that season, Wallace donned the blue and white colors of Miller Lite in 1997, quickly being nicknamed "The Blue Deuce" by fans. After winning one race a piece over the next three years, he put together four wins and won nine Bud poles in 2000, the highest total of his career. In 2002, he failed to win races, marking the first year since 1985 that he was winless throughout a season. After that year, the team switched manufacturers from Ford to Dodge. In 2004, Wallace announced the 2005 season would be his last in the Cup Series, citing his son's racing career and wanting to concentrate on his Busch Series team, Rusty Wallace Racing, for the departure. During that season, Wallace returned to victory lane for the first time since 2001 at Martinsville, one of his historically strong racetracks. Although he would not win a race during his final season, Wallace qualified for the Chase for the Nextel Cup and finished eighth in series points.

Kurt Busch (2006–2010)

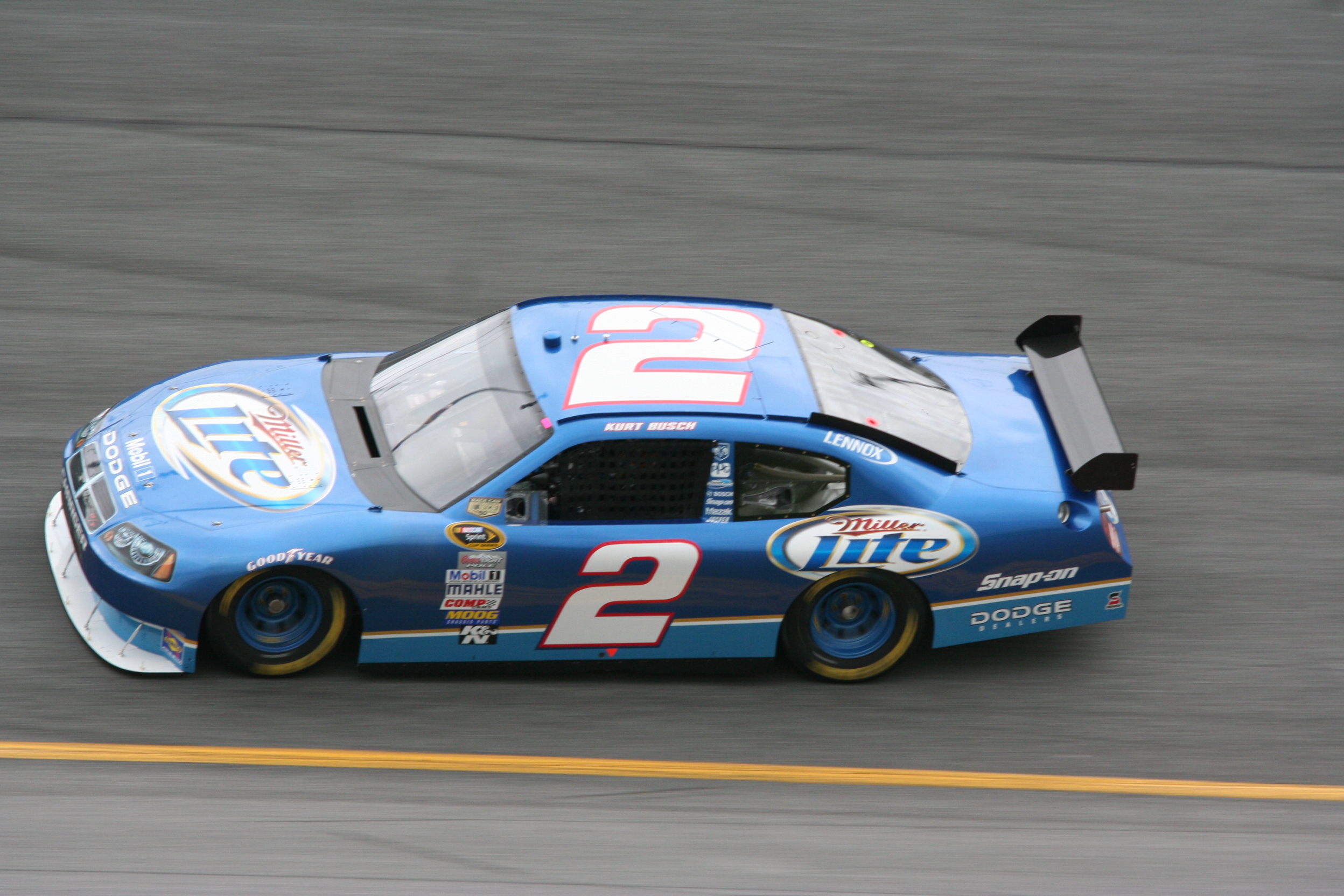
The No. 2 car in 2008 with Kurt Busch driving

To replace the retiring Wallace, Penske tabbed 2004 Nextel Cup Champion Kurt Busch. However, this caused a problem with Busch's then-current team, Roush Racing, as he was still under contract for the 2006 season. The situation was resolved thanks in part to the resolution of another disputed contract with Roush. Roush Racing signed Jamie McMurray to drive their No. 6 car for the 2006 season but his previous team owner, Chip Ganassi, would not let him drive for Roush. Eventually, an agreement was struck where McMurray was released from his team to replace Busch in the No. 97 car (which was then renumbered to 26), therefore freeing up Busch to drive the No. 2 car. He quickly brought the team back to victory lane by winning in his fifth start with the team at Bristol, his only win of 2006. The No. 2 team finished 16th in the season points. Busch won six additional races with the No. 2 car, his last being the 2010 Coca-Cola 600. He qualified for the Chase three times, with a best finish of fourth in the final standings in 2009.

Brad Keselowski (2011–2021)

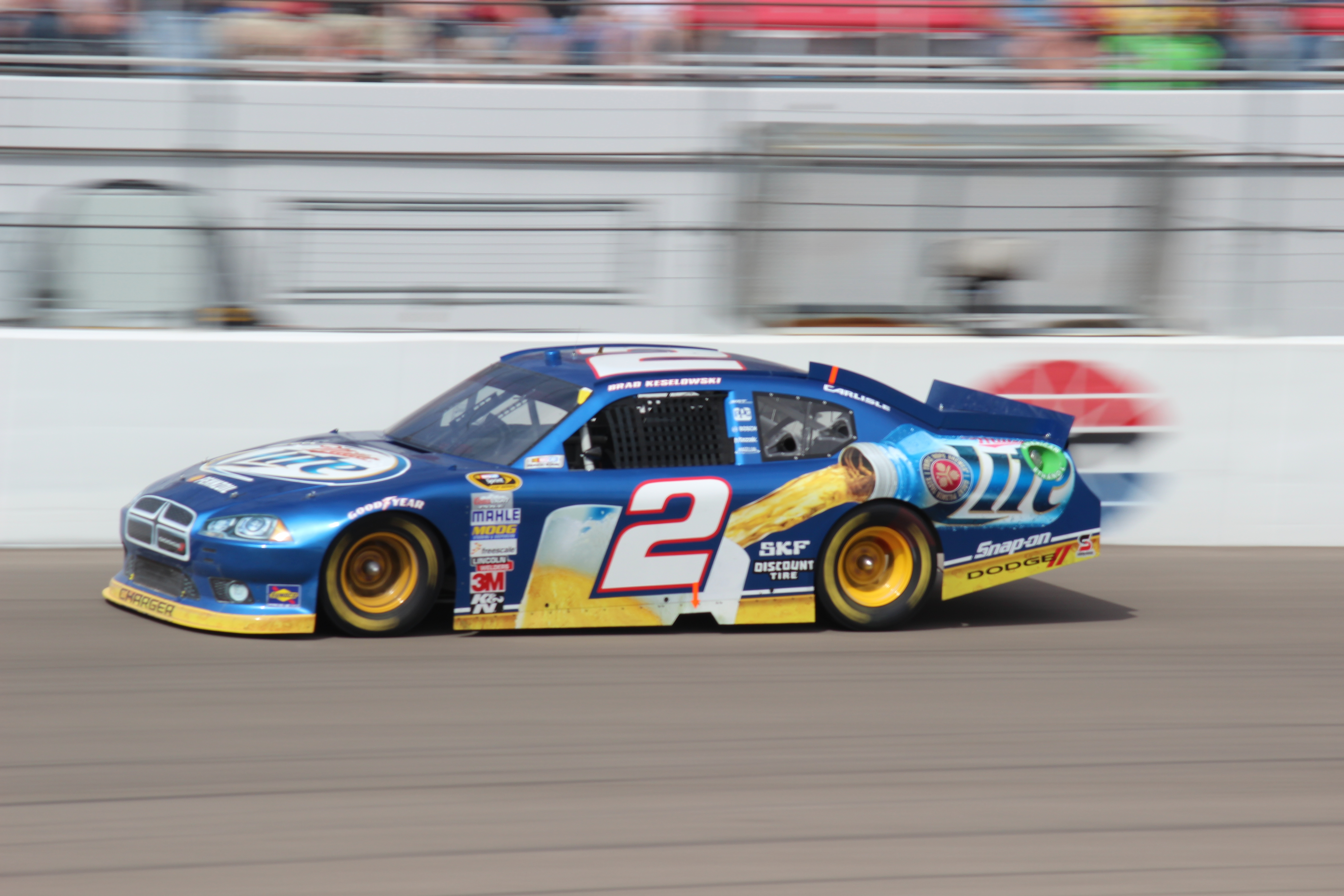
Brad Keselowski won the 2012 NASCAR Sprint Cup Series Championship.

In 2011, the No. 2 team swapped numbers with the No. 12 team of Brad Keselowski, which secured Keselowski's run with the No. 2 team's points. Jay Guy was replaced by Nationwide Series crew chief Paul Wolfe as the team's crew chief. The No. 2 team with Keselowski and Wolfe initially struggled for the first half of the season, although they won a fuel-mileage race at Kansas. The team's performance started to improve dramatically after Keselowski injured his leg during a testing crash at Road Atlanta. Keselowski and Wolfe grabbed two more wins at Pocono and at Bristol and rallied to make the 2011 Chase field. However, the final 10 races would be an up and down affair for the team, and they were knocked out of contention after finishing 18th at Phoenix. Nonetheless, Keselowski managed a fifth-place finish in points, a dramatic turnaround from his 2010 performance.

2012 would be Keselowski's breakout season, as he won five races at Bristol, Talladega, Kentucky, Chicagoland, and Dover, with the last two being his first Chase wins. He would ultimately win Team Penske its first Sprint Cup title after a close battle with Jimmie Johnson. This would also be the final year of Dodge in the Cup series.

With Dodge's departure, Team Penske switched back to Ford in the 2013 season. Compared to his 2012 championship run, Keselowski's 2013 season was a step back, as he opened the season with four top-fives but struggled with consistency from there and eventually missed the Chase altogether. He would win a single race, at Charlotte in October, and rallied to finish fourteenth in points, the highest rank outside the Chase field (due to the Richmond scandal that resulted in Jeff Gordon getting an additional Chase berth).

Keselowski recovered quickly in 2014, winning the third race of the year at Las Vegas after Dale Earnhardt Jr. ran out of gas on the final lap. He later dominated and won Kentucky to become the first two-time winner at the track, and dominated the July race at Loudon and the September race at Richmond as well, to secure the top seed in the reformatted Chase for the Sprint Cup. Keselowski then won back-to-back for the first time in his career in the first Chase race at Chicagoland, to secure an immediate transfer into the Contender round of the new Chase. After suffering a blown tire at Kansas and tussling with Matt Kenseth and Denny Hamlin at Charlotte, Keselowski went to Talladega needing to win to make the Eliminator round, which he ultimately did after outbattling Ryan Newman on the final lap. However, he suffered a mechanical failure that caused him to wreck at Martinsville, and subsequently tangled with Gordon at Texas, which led to a post-race brawl that became one of the highlights of the season. Keselowski would ultimately be eliminated from the Chase after Phoenix, and finished fifth in the final points, with his six wins being a career-high.

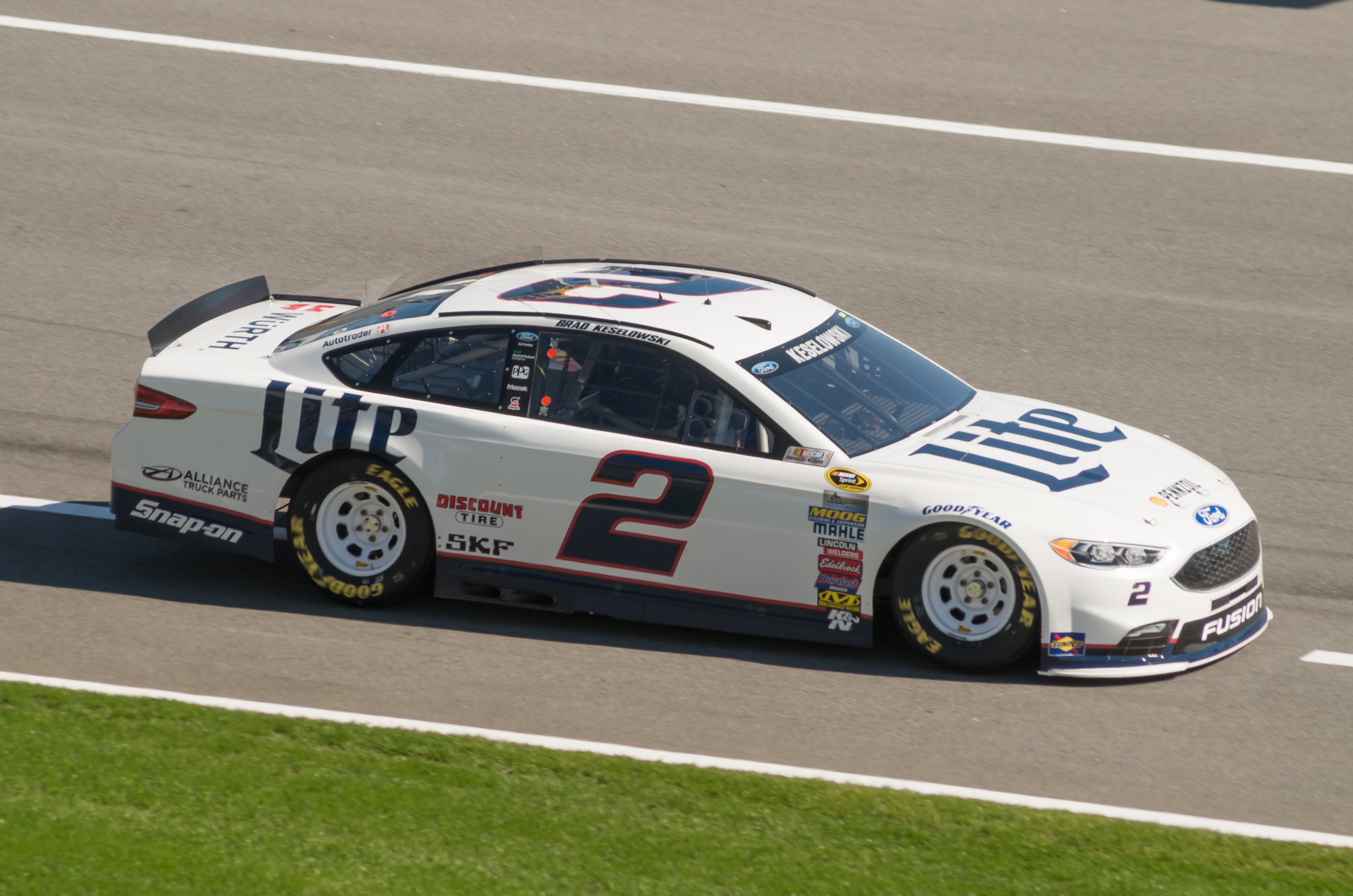
Brad Keselowski's No. 2 at Daytona International Speedway in 2016.

Keselowski won his first race of 2015 at California after taking advantage of two late cautions to run down the dominant car of ex-teammate Kurt Busch. This would prove to be the only win of his season, but Keselowski once again advanced to the Eliminator Round of the Chase before suffering another wreck at Martinsville, and after leading the majority of the Texas race only to be passed by Jimmie Johnson with six laps to go, Keselowski was once again eliminated from championship contention after Phoenix.

Keselowski got back to his winning ways in 2016, breaking through at Las Vegas for the second time in three seasons. He also scored his third win in the GEICO 500 at Talladega, then found his first Daytona win in the Coke Zero 400, followed by his third career win at Kentucky.

Keselowski got his first win in 2017 after Kevin Harvick had trouble in the pits at Atlanta Motor Speedway. He was leading at Las Vegas when something broke in the car with two to go. He hung on for fifth. He remained consistent, winning the STP 500 for his first Martinsville win. He continued to be consistent until a strange crash early in the Coca-Cola 600, when a piece of metal from Jeffrey Earnhardt pierced Chase Elliott's grill and went into his engine, causing a mass oil leak and fire. Brad slid in the oil, right to Elliott's rear end. Keselowski would go on to make the playoffs for the sixth time in his Cup series career and score an additional win in the wreck infested Alabama 500 at the Talladega Superspeedway and have the dominant car at Martinsville before a late-race caution and contact with Chase Elliott took him out of contention for the win and he would finish fourth. Keselowski made the final round at Homestead-Miami speedway finished seventh in the race and fourth in the final standings to champion Martin Truex Jr.

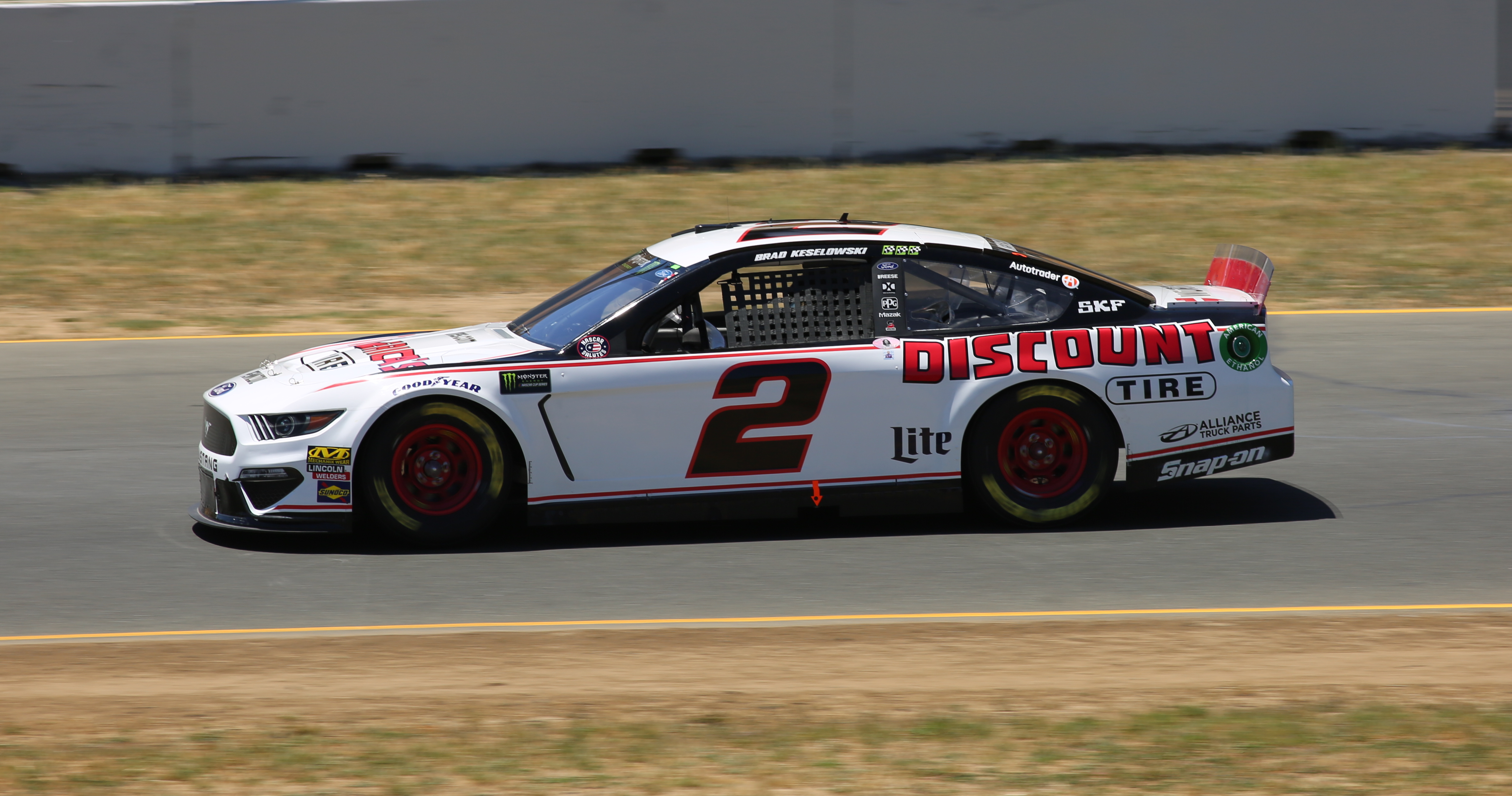
Brad Keselowski's No. 2 at Sonoma Raceway in 2019

In 2018, Keselowski scored three wins in a row at Darlington, Indianapolis, and Las Vegas, but his run at the Playoffs was marred by bad finishes at the Charlotte Roval, Talladega, and Dover, resulting in his elimination from the Round of 12. Keselowski finished the season eighth in points.

Keselowski started the 2019 season with a twelfth place finish at the Daytona 500. A week later, he won at Atlanta; this gave him his sixtieth overall win with Team Penske and the first MENCS win for the new Ford Mustang GT. Keselowski also scored wins at Martinsville and Kansas and finished eighth in points for the second consecutive year.

Keselowski rebounded in 2020. He scored three wins and finished third in points after the regular season. In the second race of the playoffs, he scored his fourth win of the season at Richmond and made the final four but would lose the championship to Chase Elliott.

In 2021, Keslowski won only once at the spring Talladega race but made still made it to the round of 8 although he would miss the final four after finishing third at Martinsville. He would finish sixth in points.

Austin Cindric (2022–present)

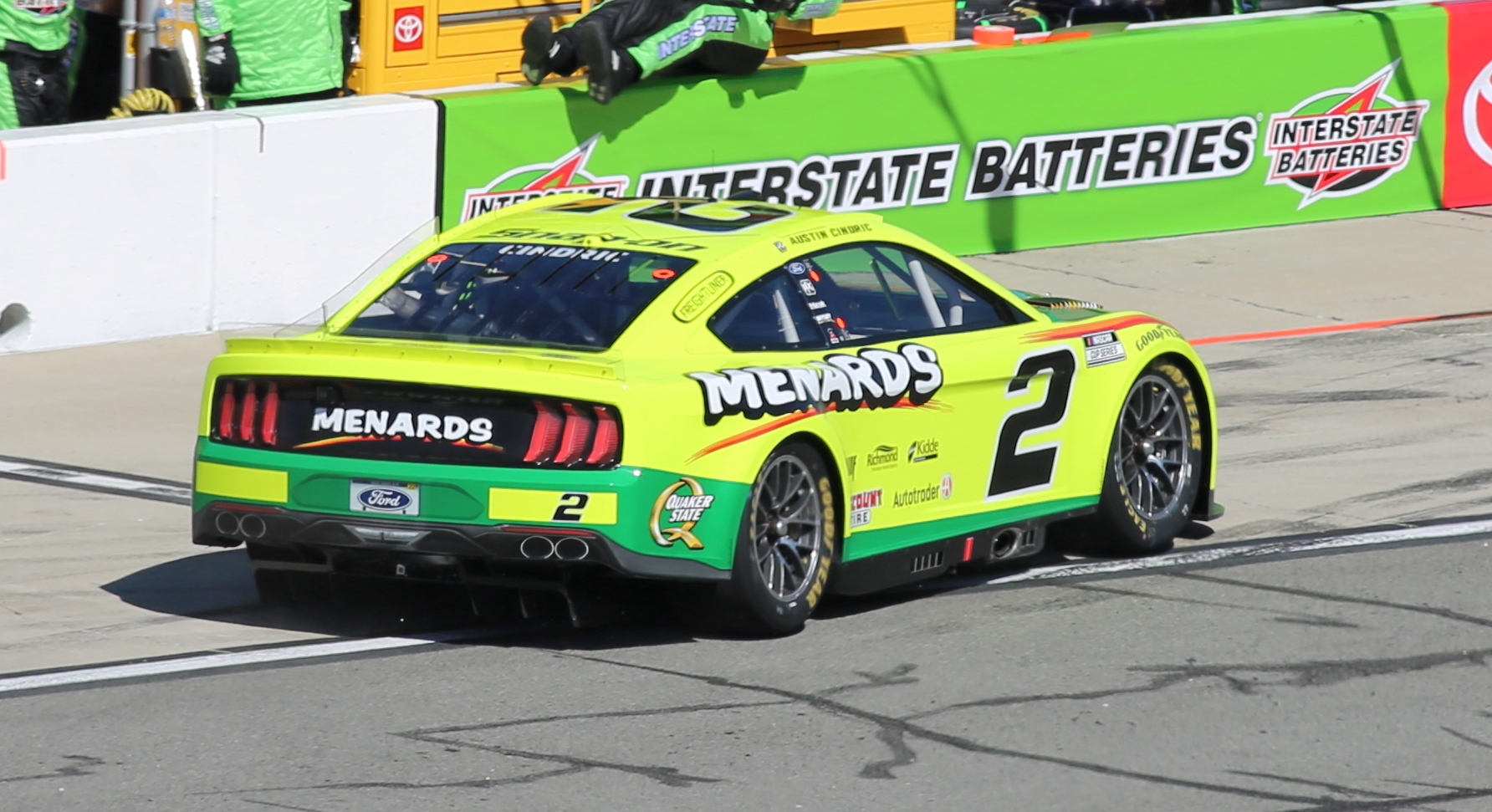
Austin Cindric in the No. 2 at Auto Club Speedway in 2022

On July 15, 2021, it was confirmed that Keselowski would not be returning to Team Penske in 2022 (revealing on July 20 that he had accepted a driver and co-owner role at Roush-Fenway Racing). The same day that Keselowski's departure was officially confirmed by Penske, Austin Cindric (who was originally going to drive for Wood Brothers Racing in 2022) was announced as Keselowski's replacement, as Harrison Burton would pilot the 21. Cindric won the Daytona 500 in his first full time start in the Cup Series with Penske. On July 20, crew chief Jeremy Bullins was suspended for four races due to a tire and wheel loss during the 2022 Ambetter 301 at Loudon. Cindric was eliminated in the Round of 12 after finishing 21st at the Charlotte Roval. He finished the season 12th in the points standings and won the NASCAR Rookie of the Year honors.

Cindric struggled during the 2023 season, scoring only three top-ten finishes and failing to make the playoffs. His highest finish of the season was fifth place at the fall Talladega race.

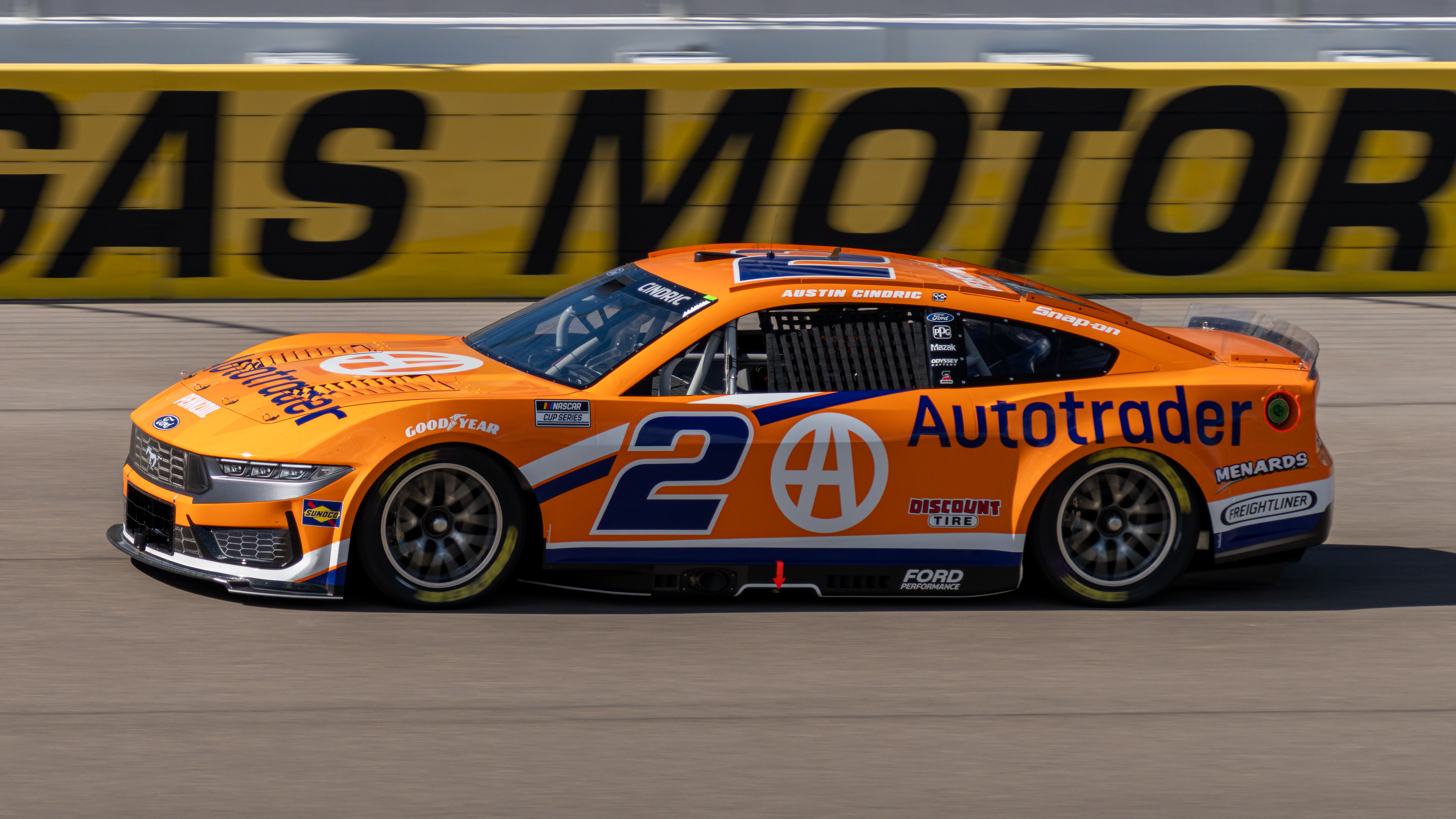
Austin Cindric in the No. 2 at Las Vegas Motor Speedway in 2025

Cindric started the 2024 season with a 22nd place finish at the 2024 Daytona 500. He scored his second career win at Gateway after Christopher Bell lost an engine and Ryan Blaney ran out of gas, breaking an 85-race winless streak.

Cindric started the 2025 season with an eighth place finish at the 2025 Daytona 500. Following the COTA race, he was docked 50 driver points and fined US$50,000 for right-rear hooking Ty Dillon. Cindric scored his first win of the season at Talladega after beating Ryan Preece by 0.022 to the finish line.

==== Car No. 2 results ====
| Year | Driver | No. | Make | 1 | 2 | 3 | 4 | 5 | 6 | 7 | 8 | 9 | 10 | 11 | 12 | 13 | 14 | 15 | 16 | 17 | 18 | 19 | 20 | 21 | 22 | 23 | 24 | 25 | 26 | 27 | 28 | 29 | 30 | 31 | 32 | 33 | 34 | 35 | 36 | Owners | Pts |
|---|---|---|---|---|---|---|---|---|---|---|---|---|---|---|---|---|---|---|---|---|---|---|---|---|---|---|---|---|---|---|---|---|---|---|---|---|---|---|---|---|---|
| 1991 | Rusty Wallace | 2 | Pontiac | DAY; 27 | RCH; 4 | CAR; 28 | ATL; 10 | DAR; 5 | BRI; 1 | NWS; 32 | MAR; 21 | TAL; 26 | CLT; 22 | DOV; 9 | SON; 3* | POC; 31 | MCH; 17 | DAY; 12 | POC; 1 | TAL; 6 | GLN; 4 | MCH; 3 | BRI; 32 | DAR; 32 | RCH; 3 | DOV; 25 | MAR; 7 | NWS; 6 | CLT; 27 | CAR; 11 | PHO; 5 | ATL; 34 | | | | | | | | 10th | 3582 |
| 1992 | Rusty Wallace | 2 | Pontiac | DAY; 31 | CAR; 26 | RCH; 17 | ATL; 15 | DAR; 11 | BRI; 9 | NWS; 2 | MAR; 31 | TAL; 11 | CLT; 18 | DOV; 3 | SON; 7 | POC; 24 | MCH; 37 | DAY; 9 | POC; 18 | TAL; 11 | GLN; 6 | MCH; 21 | BRI; 10 | DAR; 9 | RCH; 1* | DOV; 16 | MAR; 2* | NWS; 4 | CLT; 37 | CAR; 21 | PHO; 28* | ATL; 6 | | | | | | | | 13th | 3556 |
| 1993 | Rusty Wallace | 2 | Pontiac | DAY; 32 | CAR; 1* | RCH; 2 | ATL; 3 | DAR; 5 | BRI; 1* | NWS; 1 | MAR; 1* | TAL; 6 | SON; 38 | CLT; 29 | DOV; 21 | POC; 39 | MCH; 5 | DAY; 18 | NHA; 1 | POC; 2 | TAL; 17 | GLN; 19 | MCH; 6 | BRI; 2* | DAR; 3 | RCH; 1* | DOV; 1* | MAR; 2 | NWS; 1* | CLT; 4 | CAR; 1* | PHO; 19 | ATL; 1* | | | | | | | 2nd | 4446 |
| 1994 | Rusty Wallace | 2 | Ford | DAY; 41 | CAR; 1* | RCH; 2 | ATL; 24 | DAR; 33 | BRI; 7 | NWS; 2 | MAR; 1* | TAL; 33 | SON; 5 | CLT; 2* | DOV; 1 | POC; 1* | MCH; 1* | DAY; 26 | NHA; 3 | POC; 9 | TAL; 42 | IND; 4 | GLN; 17 | MCH; 4 | BRI; 1 | DAR; 7 | RCH; 4 | DOV; 1 | MAR; 1* | NWS; 4 | CLT; 37 | CAR; 35 | PHO; 17 | ATL; 32 | | | | | | 3rd | 4207 |
| 1995 | Rusty Wallace | 2 | Ford | DAY; 34 | CAR; 24 | RCH; 3* | ATL; 10 | DAR; 23 | BRI; 2 | NWS; 4 | MAR; 1* | TAL; 20 | SON; 20 | CLT; 34 | DOV; 9 | POC; 17 | MCH; 3 | DAY; 27 | NHA; 6 | POC; 16* | TAL; 30 | IND; 2 | GLN; 26 | MCH; 5 | BRI; 21 | DAR; 3 | RCH; 1* | DOV; 3 | MAR; 3 | NWS; 2 | CLT; 9 | CAR; 2 | PHO; 4 | ATL; 3 | | | | | | 5th | 4240 |
| 1996 | Rusty Wallace | 2 | Ford | DAY; 16 | CAR; 22 | RCH; 7 | ATL; 36 | DAR; 4 | BRI; 5 | NWS; 33 | MAR; 1 | TAL; 30 | SON; 1* | CLT; 34 | DOV; 7 | POC; 31 | MCH; 1 | DAY; 31 | NHA; 7 | POC; 1 | TAL; 10 | IND; 7 | GLN; 33 | MCH; 39 | BRI; 1* | DAR; 38 | RCH; 6 | DOV; 2 | MAR; 36 | NWS; 10 | CLT; 8 | CAR; 8 | PHO; 40 | ATL; 10 | | | | | | 7th | 3717 |
| 1997 | Rusty Wallace | 2 | Ford | DAY; 41 | CAR; 6 | RCH; 1 | ATL; 31 | DAR; 6 | TEX; 37 | BRI; 2* | MAR; 5 | SON; 40 | TAL; 37 | CLT; 2 | DOV; 39 | POC; 22 | MCH; 29 | CAL; 14 | DAY; 6 | NHA; 3 | POC; 37 | IND; 38 | GLN; 3 | MCH; 13 | BRI; 12 | DAR; 43 | RCH; 5 | NHA; 21 | DOV; 16 | MAR; 15* | CLT; 12 | TAL; 10 | CAR; 18 | PHO; 2* | ATL; 32 | | | | | 9th | 3598 |
| 1998 | Rusty Wallace | 2 | Ford | DAY; 5 | CAR; 2 | LVS; 3 | ATL; 4 | DAR; 3 | BRI; 33* | TEX; 12 | MAR; 6 | TAL; 12 | CAL; 34 | CLT; 2 | DOV; 18 | RCH; 3 | MCH; 17 | POC; 42 | SON; 5 | NHA; 4 | POC; 6 | IND; 8 | GLN; 4 | MCH; 23 | BRI; 3 | NHA; 8 | DAR; 7 | RCH; 7 | DOV; 5 | MAR; 28 | CLT; 26 | TAL; 27 | DAY; 5 | PHO; 1* | CAR; 3 | ATL; 20 | | | | 4th | 4501 |
| 1999 | Rusty Wallace | 2 | Ford | DAY; 8* | CAR; 10 | LVS; 9 | ATL; 35 | DAR; 33 | TEX; 4 | BRI; 1* | MAR; 7* | TAL; 41 | CAL; 11 | RCH; 5 | CLT; 31 | DOV; 6 | MCH; 12 | POC; 43 | SON; 4 | DAY; 11* | NHA; 42 | POC; 18 | IND; 8 | GLN; 3 | MCH; 16 | BRI; 18 | DAR; 8 | RCH; 14 | NHA; 6* | DOV; 32 | MAR; 4 | CLT; 8 | TAL; 11 | CAR; 5 | PHO; 32 | HOM; 12 | ATL; 13 | | | 8th | 4155 |
| 2000 | Rusty Wallace | 2 | Ford | DAY; 4 | CAR; 11 | LVS; 15 | ATL; 32 | DAR; 16 | BRI; 1 | TEX; 4 | MAR; 10* | TAL; 41 | CAL; 8 | RCH; 5* | CLT; 8 | DOV; 14 | MCH; 7 | POC; 10* | SON; 26 | DAY; 3 | NHA; 15 | POC; 1 | IND; 2* | GLN; 34 | MCH; 1* | BRI; 1* | DAR; 30 | RCH; 34 | NHA; 5 | DOV; 8 | MAR; 23 | CLT; 21 | TAL; 8 | CAR; 5 | PHO; 4 | HOM; 15 | ATL; 7 | | | 7th | 4544 |
| 2001 | Rusty Wallace | 2 | Ford | DAY; 3 | CAR; 7 | LVS; 43 | ATL; 12 | DAR; 10 | BRI; 7 | TEX; 12 | MAR; 13 | TAL; 13 | CAL; 1* | RCH; 3* | CLT; 14 | DOV; 21 | MCH; 41 | POC; 16 | SON; 5 | DAY; 7 | CHI; 13 | NHA; 43 | POC; 6 | IND; 4 | GLN; 43 | MCH; 17 | BRI; 5 | DAR; 22 | RCH; 5* | DOV; 11 | KAN; 4* | CLT; 7 | MAR; 15 | TAL; 16 | PHO; 15 | CAR; 24 | HOM; 12 | ATL; 12 | NHA; 18 | 7th | 4481 |
| 2002 | Rusty Wallace | 2 | Ford | DAY; 18 | CAR; 8 | LVS; 11 | ATL; 6 | DAR; 7 | BRI; 9 | TEX; 11 | MAR; 16 | TAL; 8 | CAL; 8 | RCH; 25 | CLT; 10 | DOV; 17 | POC; 9 | MCH; 7 | SON; 27 | DAY; 2 | CHI; 25 | NHA; 4 | POC; 40 | IND; 2 | GLN; 17 | MCH; 24 | BRI; 2 | DAR; 22 | RCH; 15 | NHA; 19 | DOV; 15 | KAN; 3 | TAL; 13 | CLT; 5 | MAR; 9 | ATL; 17 | CAR; 27 | PHO; 2 | HOM; 14 | 7th | 4574 |
| 2003 | Rusty Wallace | 2 | Dodge | DAY; 25 | CAR; 6* | LVS; 40 | ATL; 15 | DAR; 16 | BRI; 14 | TEX; 14 | TAL; 37 | MAR; 8 | CAL; 3* | RCH; 10 | CLT; 12 | DOV; 6 | POC; 16 | MCH; 12 | SON; 8 | DAY; 28 | CHI; 32 | NHA; 17 | POC; 11 | IND; 10 | GLN; 37 | MCH; 38 | BRI; 43 | DAR; 36 | RCH; 5 | NHA; 6 | DOV; 10 | TAL; 9 | KAN; 9 | CLT; 13 | MAR; 29 | ATL; 19 | PHO; 33 | CAR; 23 | HOM; 23 | 14th | 3950 |
| 2004 | Rusty Wallace | 2 | Dodge | DAY; 29 | CAR; 7 | LVS; 10 | ATL; 35 | DAR; 29 | BRI; 2 | TEX; 5 | MAR; 1 | TAL; 33 | CAL; 35 | RCH; 16 | CLT; 10 | DOV; 13 | POC; 32 | MCH; 22 | SON; 28 | DAY; 27 | CHI; 11 | NHA; 30 | POC; 17 | IND; 13 | GLN; 25 | MCH; 36 | BRI; 26 | CAL; 10 | RCH; 10 | NHA; 14 | DOV; 13 | TAL; 26 | KAN; 18 | CLT; 31 | MAR; 10 | ATL; 11 | PHO; 7 | DAR; 18 | HOM; 8 | 16th | 3960 |
| 2005 | Rusty Wallace | 2 | Dodge | DAY; 10 | CAL; 10 | LVS; 12 | ATL; 27 | BRI; 13* | MAR; 5 | TEX; 10 | PHO; 36 | TAL; 22 | DAR; 12 | RCH; 19 | CLT; 10 | DOV; 5 | POC; 11 | MCH; 10 | SON; 4 | DAY; 4 | CHI; 12 | NHA; 8 | POC; 2 | IND; 25 | GLN; 6 | MCH; 13 | BRI; 5 | CAL; 15 | RCH; 5 | NHA; 6 | DOV; 3 | TAL; 25 | KAN; 7 | CLT; 24 | MAR; 19 | ATL; 37 | TEX; 22 | PHO; 29 | HOM; 13 | 8th | 6140 |
| 2006 | Kurt Busch | 2 | Dodge | DAY; 38 | CAL; 16 | LVS; 16 | ATL; 37 | BRI; 1 | MAR; 11 | TEX; 34 | PHO; 24 | TAL; 7 | RCH; 29 | DAR; 19 | CLT; 39 | DOV; 16 | POC; 2 | MCH; 9 | SON; 5 | DAY; 3 | CHI; 8 | NHA; 38 | POC; 2 | IND; 12 | GLN; 19 | MCH; 40 | BRI; 37 | CAL; 27 | RCH; 27 | NHA; 19 | DOV; 4 | KAN; 25 | TAL; 3 | CLT; 32 | MAR; 27 | ATL; 14 | TEX; 8 | PHO; 8 | HOM; 43 | 16th | 3900 |
| 2007 | Kurt Busch | 2 | Dodge | DAY; 41 | CAL; 7 | LVS; 26 | ATL; 11 | BRI; 29 | MAR; 12 | TEX; 11 | PHO; 18 | TAL; 3 | RCH; 5 | DAR; 12 | CLT; 32 | DOV; 42 | POC; 16 | MCH; 25 | SON; 22 | NHA; 21 | DAY; 3 | CHI; 6 | IND; 11 | POC; 1 | GLN; 11 | MCH; 1 | BRI; 6 | CAL; 9 | RCH; 9 | NHA; 25 | DOV; 29 | KAN; 11 | TAL; 7 | CLT; 26 | MAR; 21 | ATL; 8 | TEX; 8 | PHO; 12 | HOM; 2 | 7th | 6231 |
| 2008 | Kurt Busch | 2 | Dodge | DAY; 2 | CAL; 13 | LVS; 38 | ATL; 11 | BRI; 12 | MAR; 33 | TEX; 23 | PHO; 23 | TAL; 39 | RCH; 42 | DAR; 12 | CLT; 16 | DOV; 20 | POC; 8 | MCH; 21 | SON; 32 | NHA; 1 | DAY; 4 | CHI; 28 | IND; 40 | POC; 38 | GLN; 10 | MCH; 36 | BRI; 15 | CAL; 39 | RCH; 10 | NHA; 6 | DOV; 34 | KAN; 30 | TAL; 21 | CLT; 3 | MAR; 36 | ATL; 6 | TEX; 41 | PHO; 2 | HOM; 43 | 18th | 3635 |
| 2009 | Kurt Busch | 2 | Dodge | DAY; 10 | CAL; 5 | LVS; 23 | ATL; 1 | BRI; 11 | MAR; 18 | TEX; 8 | PHO; 3 | TAL; 6 | RCH; 12 | DAR; 16 | CLT; 34 | DOV; 5 | POC; 37 | MCH; 8 | SON; 15 | NHA; 3 | DAY; 5 | CHI; 17 | IND; 27 | POC; 9 | GLN; 7 | MCH; 36 | BRI; 7 | ATL; 38 | RCH; 2 | NHA; 6 | DOV; 5 | KAN; 11 | CAL; 8 | CLT; 10 | MAR; 17 | TAL; 30 | TEX; 1 | PHO; 6 | HOM; 4 | 4th | 6446 |
| 2010 | Kurt Busch | 2 | Dodge | DAY; 23 | CAL; 6 | LVS; 35 | ATL; 1 | BRI; 3 | MAR; 23 | PHO; 35 | TEX; 4 | TAL; 8 | RCH; 18 | DAR; 3 | DOV; 19 | CLT; 1 | POC; 6 | MCH; 3 | SON; 32 | NHA; 3 | DAY; 7 | CHI; 26 | IND; 10 | POC; 33 | GLN; 2 | MCH; 40 | BRI; 9 | ATL; 6 | RCH; 18 | NHA; 13 | DOV; 4 | KAN; 13 | CAL; 21 | CLT; 30 | MAR; 16 | TAL; 30 | TEX; 24 | PHO; 9 | HOM; 18 | 11th | 6142 |
| 2011 | Brad Keselowski | 2 | Dodge | DAY; 29 | PHO; 15 | LVS; 26 | BRI; 18 | CAL; 26 | MAR; 19 | TEX; 18 | TAL; 33 | RCH; 26 | DAR; 3 | DOV; 13 | CLT; 19 | KAN; 1 | POC; 23 | MCH; 25 | SON; 10 | DAY; 15 | KEN; 7 | NHA; 35 | IND; 9 | POC; 1 | GLN; 2 | MCH; 3 | BRI; 1 | ATL; 6 | RCH; 12 | CHI; 6 | NHA; 2 | DOV; 20 | KAN; 3 | CLT; 16 | TAL; 4 | MAR; 17 | TEX; 24 | PHO; 18 | HOM; 20 | 5th | 2319 |
| 2012 | Brad Keselowski | 2 | Dodge | DAY; 32 | PHO; 5 | LVS; 32 | BRI; 1* | CAL; 18 | MAR; 9 | TEX; 36 | KAN; 11 | RCH; 9 | TAL; 1 | DAR; 15 | CLT; 5 | DOV; 12 | POC; 18 | MCH; 13 | SON; 12 | KEN; 1 | DAY; 8 | NHA; 5 | IND; 9 | POC; 4 | GLN; 2 | MCH; 2 | BRI; 30 | ATL; 3 | RCH; 7 | CHI; 1 | NHA; 6 | DOV; 1 | TAL; 7 | CLT; 11* | KAN; 8 | MAR; 6 | TEX; 2 | PHO; 6 | HOM; 15 | 1st | 2400 |
| 2013 | Brad Keselowski | 2 | Ford | DAY; 4 | PHO; 4 | LVS; 3 | BRI; 3 | CAL; 23 | MAR; 6 | TEX; 9 | KAN; 6 | RCH; 33 | TAL; 15 | DAR; 32 | CLT; 35 | DOV; 5 | POC; 16 | MCH; 12 | SON; 21 | KEN; 33 | DAY; 21 | NHA; 4 | IND; 21 | POC; 6 | GLN; 2 | MCH; 12 | BRI; 30 | ATL; 35 | RCH; 17* | CHI; 7 | NHA; 11 | DOV; 37 | KAN; 17 | CLT; 1 | TAL; 29 | MAR; 4 | TEX; 6 | PHO; 11 | HOM; 6 | 14th | 1041 |
| 2014 | Brad Keselowski | 2 | Ford | DAY; 3 | PHO; 3 | LVS; 1* | BRI; 14 | CAL; 26 | MAR; 38 | TEX; 15 | DAR; 17 | RCH; 4 | TAL; 38 | KAN; 13 | CLT; 10 | DOV; 2 | POC; 2* | MCH; 3 | SON; 22 | KEN; 1* | DAY; 18 | NHA; 1* | IND; 12 | POC; 23 | GLN; 35 | MCH; 8 | BRI; 2 | ATL; 39 | RCH; 1* | CHI; 1 | NHA; 7 | DOV; 2 | KAN; 36 | CLT; 16 | TAL; 1 | MAR; 31 | TEX; 3 | PHO; 4 | HOM; 3 | 5th | 2361 |
| 2015 | Brad Keselowski | 2 | Ford | DAY; 41 | ATL; 9 | LVS; 7 | PHO; 6 | CAL; 1 | MAR; 2 | TEX; 5 | BRI; 35 | RCH; 17 | TAL; 22 | KAN; 7 | CLT; 7 | DOV; 12 | POC; 17 | MCH; 6 | SON; 19 | DAY; 29 | KEN; 6 | NHA; 2* | IND; 10 | POC; 2 | GLN; 7 | MCH; 9 | BRI; 6 | DAR; 2* | RCH; 8 | CHI; 8 | NHA; 12 | DOV; 16 | CLT; 9 | KAN; 9 | TAL; 4 | MAR; 32 | TEX; 2* | PHO; 9 | HOM; 3* | 7th | 2347 |
| 2016 | Brad Keselowski | 2 | Ford | DAY; 20 | ATL; 9 | LVS; 1 | PHO; 29 | CAL; 9 | MAR; 5 | TEX; 18 | BRI; 18 | RCH; 11 | TAL; 1* | KAN; 10 | DOV; 6 | CLT; 5 | POC; 3 | MCH; 4 | SON; 15 | DAY; 1* | KEN; 1 | NHA; 15 | IND; 17 | POC; 2 | GLN; 3* | BRI; 33 | MCH; 3 | DAR; 9 | RCH; 4 | CHI; 5 | NHA; 4 | DOV; 4 | CLT; 7 | KAN; 38 | TAL; 38* | MAR; 2 | TEX; 14 | PHO; 14 | HOM; 35 | 12th | 2267 |
| 2017 | Brad Keselowski | 2 | Ford | DAY; 27 | ATL; 1 | LVS; 5 | PHO; 5 | CAL; 2 | MAR; 1 | TEX; 6 | BRI; 34 | RCH; 2 | TAL; 7 | KAN; 2 | CLT; 39 | DOV; 38 | POC; 5 | MCH; 16 | SON; 3 | DAY; 31* | KEN; 39 | NHA; 9 | IND; 2 | POC; 5 | GLN; 15 | MCH; 17* | BRI; 29 | DAR; 15 | RCH; 11 | CHI; 6 | NHA; 4 | DOV; 10 | CLT; 15 | TAL; 1 | KAN; 13 | MAR; 4 | TEX; 5 | PHO; 16 | HOM; 7 | 4th | 5030 |
| 2018 | Brad Keselowski | 2 | Ford | DAY; 32 | ATL; 2 | LVS; 6 | PHO; 15 | CAL; 4 | MAR; 10 | TEX; 33 | BRI; 23 | RCH; 8 | TAL; 33 | DOV; 6 | KAN; 14 | CLT; 4 | POC; 5 | MCH; 6 | SON; 13 | CHI; 9 | DAY; 36 | KEN; 3 | NHA; 32 | POC; 38 | GLN; 17 | MCH; 2 | BRI; 16 | DAR; 1 | IND; 1 | LVS; 1 | RCH; 9 | CLT; 31 | DOV; 14 | TAL; 27 | KAN; 6 | MAR; 5 | TEX; 12 | PHO; 2 | HOM; 5 | 8th | 2343 |
| 2019 | Brad Keselowski | 2 | Ford | DAY; 12 | ATL; 1 | LVS; 2 | PHO; 19 | CAL; 3 | MAR; 1* | TEX; 36 | BRI; 18 | RCH; 7 | TAL; 13 | DOV; 12 | KAN; 1 | CLT; 19 | POC; 2 | MCH; 6 | SON; 18 | CHI; 5 | DAY; 39 | KEN; 20 | NHA; 10 | POC; 8 | GLN; 9 | MCH; 19 | BRI; 3 | DAR; 5 | IND; 38 | LVS; 3 | RCH; 4 | CLT; 5 | DOV; 11 | TAL; 25 | KAN; 19 | MAR; 3 | TEX; 39 | PHO; 10 | HOM; 18 | 8th | 2318 |
| 2020 | Brad Keselowski | 2 | Ford | DAY; 36 | LVS; 7 | CAL; 5 | PHO; 11 | DAR; 13 | DAR; 4 | CLT; 1 | CLT; 7 | BRI; 1 | ATL; 9 | MAR; 3 | HOM; 10 | TAL; 19 | POC; 9 | POC; 11 | IND; 4 | KEN; 9 | TEX; 9 | KAN; 2 | NHA; 1* | MCH; 2 | MCH; 39 | DAY; 13 | DOV; 9 | DOV; 8 | DAY; 10 | DAR; 11 | RCH; 1* | BRI; 34 | LVS; 13 | TAL; 18 | CLT; 18 | KAN; 4 | TEX; 6 | MAR; 4 | PHO; 2 | 2nd | 5035 |
| 2021 | Brad Keselowski | 2 | Ford | DAY; 13 | DAY; 5 | HOM; 16 | LVS; 2 | PHO; 4 | ATL; 28 | BRI; 11 | MAR; 33 | RCH; 14 | TAL; 1 | KAN; 3 | DAR; 24 | DOV; 16 | COA; 19 | CLT; 11 | SON; 15 | NSH; 23 | POC; 10 | POC; 3 | ROA; 13 | ATL; 10 | NHA; 3 | GLN; 35 | IND; 24 | MCH; 9 | DAY; 33 | DAR; 7 | RCH; 13 | BRI; 6 | LVS; 7 | TAL; 2 | CLT; 20 | TEX; 4 | KAN; 17 | MAR; 3 | PHO; 10 | 6th | 2354 |
| 2022 | Austin Cindric | 2 | Ford | DAY; 1 | CAL; 12 | LVS; 19 | PHO; 24 | ATL; 32 | COA; 8 | RCH; 20 | MAR; 11 | BRI; 16 | TAL; 21 | DOV; 36 | DAR; 18 | KAN; 11 | CLT; 34 | GTW; 11 | SON; 5 | NSH; 7 | ROA; 7 | ATL; 3 | NHA; 13 | POC; 31 | IND; 2 | MCH; 37 | RCH; 12 | GLN; 13 | DAY; 3 | DAR; 16 | KAN; 12 | BRI; 20 | TEX; 15 | TAL; 9 | CLT; 21 | LVS; 29 | HOM; 19 | MAR; 26 | PHO; 11 | 12th | 2226 |
| 2023 | Austin Cindric | 2 | Ford | DAY; 23 | CAL; 28 | LVS; 6 | PHO; 25 | ATL; 11 | COA; 6 | RCH; 28 | BRD; 19 | MAR; 33 | TAL; 26 | DOV; 26 | KAN; 31 | DAR; 19 | CLT; 31 | GTW; 13 | SON; 25 | NSH; 27 | CSC; 6 | ATL; 12 | NHA; 25 | POC; 23 | RCH; 26 | MCH; 12 | IRC; 15 | GLN; 16 | DAY; 37 | DAR; 31 | KAN; 31 | BRI; 32 | TEX; 27 | TAL; 5 | ROV; 25 | LVS; 22 | HOM; 12 | MAR; 9 | PHO; 35 | 24th | 626 |
| 2024 | Austin Cindric | 2 | Ford | DAY; 22 | ATL; 4 | LVS; 29 | PHO; 36 | BRI; 31 | COA; 18 | RCH; 23 | MAR; 23 | TEX; 25 | TAL; 23 | DOV; 15 | KAN; 37 | DAR; 20 | CLT; 20 | GTW; 1 | SON; 22 | IOW; 30 | NHA; 19 | NSH; 15 | CSC; 15 | POC; 18 | IND; 7 | RCH; 24 | MCH; 28 | DAY; 18 | DAR; 13 | ATL; 10 | GLN; 10 | BRI; 13 | KAN; 34 | TAL; 32 | ROV; 4 | LVS; 34 | HOM; 27 | MAR; 4 | PHO; 13 | 11th | 2247 |
| 2025 | Austin Cindric | 2 | Ford | DAY; 8* | ATL; 28 | COA; 25 | PHO; 19 | LVS; 6 | HOM; 19 | MAR; 37 | DAR; 11 | BRI; 17 | TAL; 1 | TEX; 25 | KAN; 11 | CLT; 31 | NSH; 18 | MCH; 31 | MXC; 18 | POC; 10 | ATL; 38 | CSC; 27 | SON; 30 | DOV; 16 | IND; 15* | IOW; 12 | GLN; 16 | RCH; 5 | DAY; 39 | DAR; 12 | GTW; 19 | BRI; 30 | NHA; 17 | KAN; 30 | ROV; 36 | LVS; 11 | TAL; 34 | MAR; 15 | PHO; 27 | 14th | 2156 |
| 2026 | Austin Cindric | 2 | Ford | DAY; 34 | ATL; 26 | COA; 32 | PHO; 34 | LVS; 19 | DAR; 5 | MAR; 8 | BRI; 16 | KAN; 12 | TAL; 8 | TEX; 15 | GLN; 9 | CLT; 38 | NSH; 26 | MCH; 11 | POC; 14 | COR; 22 | SON; 13 | CHI; 13 | ATL; 14 | NWS; 14 | IND; 14 | IOW; 29 | RCH; 3 | NHA; 12 | DAY; 6 | DAR; 13 | GTW; 10 | BRI; 11 | KAN; 2 | LVS; 4 | CLT; 17 | PHO; 19 | TAL; 27 | MAR; 36 | HOM; 7 | 10th | 2301 |

=== Car No. 12 history ===
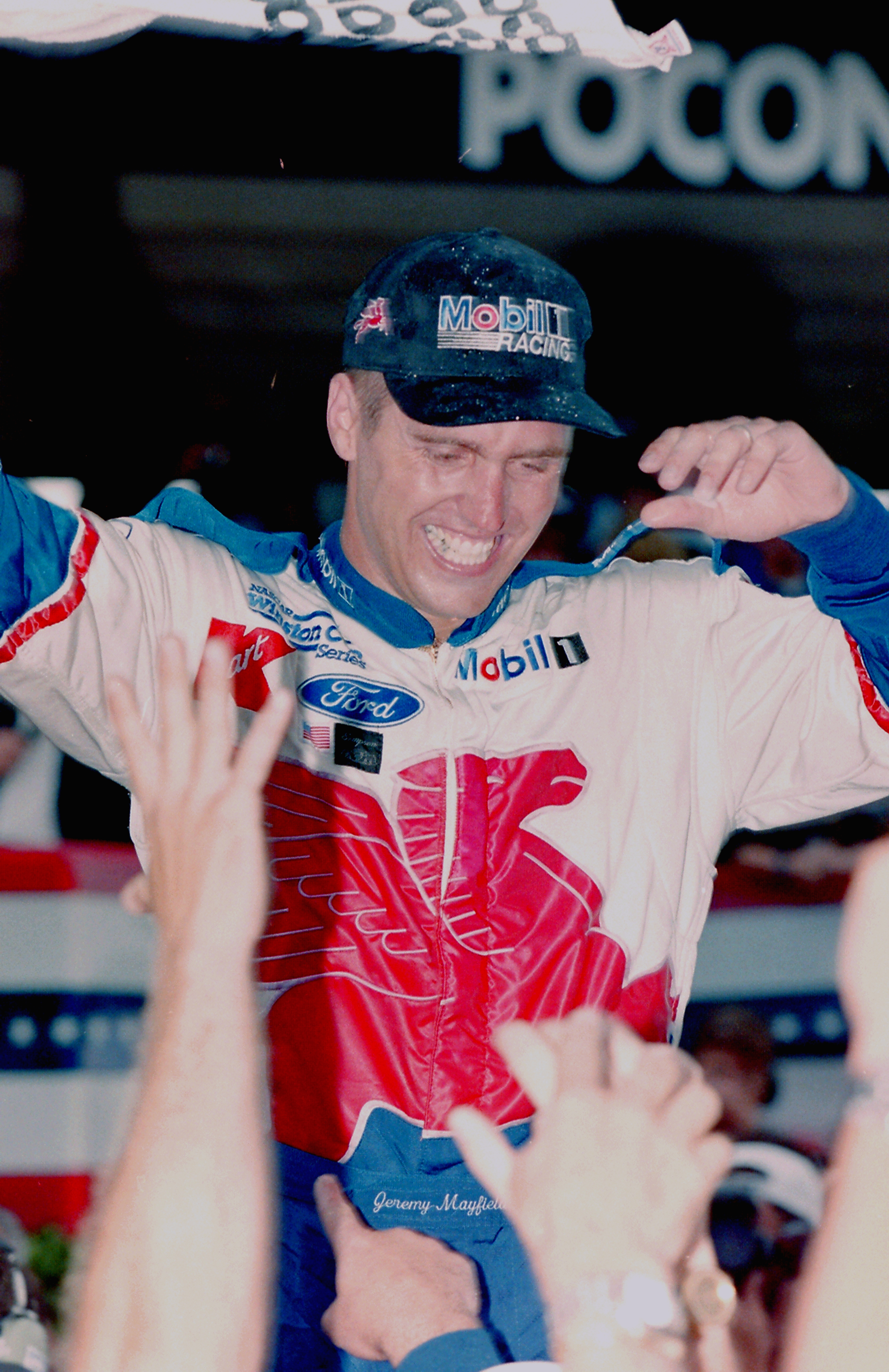
Jeremy Mayfield won 3 races in the 12 car from 1998 to 2001.

Kranefuss-Haas Racing (1994–1997)

The current 12 car started out in 1994 at Michigan as the No. 07 Ford driven by Robby Gordon and owned by German-American businessman and former Ford executive Michael Kranefuss along with Newman/Haas Racing co-principal Carl Haas. The car started and finished 38th after Gordon crashed on lap seventy. After another start with Geoff Brabham at the Brickyard 400, the team— known as Kranefuss-Haas Racing— went full-time in 1995 with John Andretti driving the Kmart/Little Caesars-sponsored No. 37 Ford. Andretti won the pole at the Mountain Dew Southern 500 and finished eighteenth in the points. The team struggled in 1996 and Kranefuss decided to replace Andretti with Jeremy Mayfield in what amounted to a driver swap between Kranefuss-Haas and Cale Yarborough's team as Andretti replaced Mayfield in Yarborough's No. 98. The team picked up co-sponsorship from Royal Crown Cola for the following season and improved to be thirteenth in the points in 1997, but it was obvious the team wouldn't succeed if it only fielded one team. At the end of the season, Kranefuss and Haas dissolved the partnership and the Kmart sponsorship moved over to Travis Carter's team, which became Haas–Carter Motorsports and the Little Caesars sponsorship left the team.

Jeremy Mayfield (1998–2001)

In 1998, Kranefuss and Penske Racing announced a merger, with Mayfield coming aboard to drive the No. 12 Mobil 1-sponsored Ford Taurus as a teammate to Rusty Wallace. The move turned out to be a success, and Mayfield became the next big star. He won the pole at Texas, and at one point in the season, found himself in the points lead. Mayfield won his first race at the 1998 Pocono 500 in June and his breakout year ended with a seventh-place finish in the points. He struggled in 1999 with no wins and an 11th-place finish in the standings. In 2000, he won at California and Pocono. Midway through the season, Kranefuss sold his share of the team to Penske. Mayfield then suffered a concussion while practicing for the Brickyard 400. He missed two races recuperating from his injury and finished 24th in points. In 2001, Mayfield posted seven top-ten finishes but was fired following the race at Kansas. Rusty Wallace's younger brother Mike Wallace took over and came close to winning at Phoenix before settling for second place to Jeff Burton.

Ryan Newman (2002–2008)

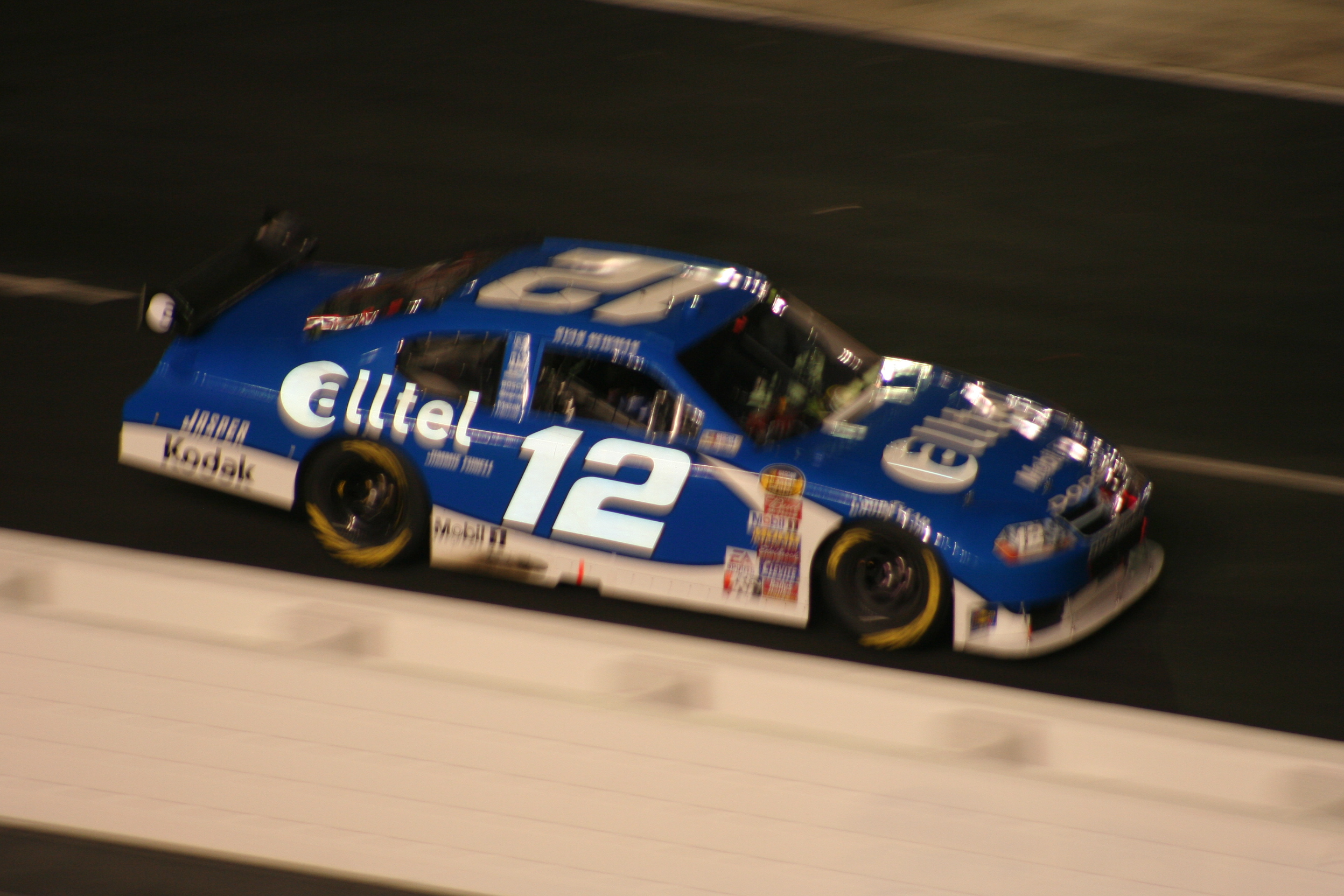
Ryan Newman in the No. 12 at Bristol Motor Speedway in 2007

Ryan Newman and his Alltel team took over the No. 12 car in 2002, although Mobil 1 stayed on as primary sponsor for several races per season. In his rookie year, Newman waged a spirited battle with Jimmie Johnson for NASCAR Rookie of the Year honors. Newman won The Winston, and the fall event at New Hampshire, as well as six poles. Although he did not win as many races as Johnson (one versus Johnson's three) and finished behind him in the points (sixth place, seven points behind fifth-place Johnson), he finished ahead of Johnson to win the Rookie of the Year honors. After the switch to Dodge in 2003, Newman won eight races and eleven poles and finished sixth in points.

In 2004, Newman won twice, earned nine pole positions, qualified for the inaugural Chase for the Nextel Cup, and finished seventh in points. Newman finished 2005 with eight pole positions, but only one win. He qualified for the Chase for the Cup for the second year in a row and ended up sixth in the final standings. He failed to win a race and missed the Chase in both 2006 and 2007. However, he found himself back in the winner's circle early in 2008, taking victory in the 50th running of the 2008 Daytona 500 (the No. 2 of Kurt Busch finished second) to open the season, claiming Penske's first Daytona 500 win. Following the Daytona 500, the team struggled and Newman announced during the summer that he would leave to drive the No. 39 Chevrolet for Stewart–Haas Racing.

David Stremme (2009)

The No. 12 car lost its sponsor in 2009 as Cellco Partners, a joint venture of Verizon and Vodafone, closed the deal to purchase Alltel in January 2009, thus voiding the terms of the grandfather clause that allowed the No. 12 car to run with a sponsor that is a direct competitor to that NASCAR series' sponsor, Sprint Corporation. The team announced that they would move the Wireless sponsorship to the IndyCar Series and the NASCAR Nationwide Series and renamed the team to Verizon Championship Racing, a reference to Verizon Wireless' Penske-wide marketing through both its IndyCar and NASCAR sponsorships, complete with its heritage of champions (especially on Vodafone's side, as it was a sponsor of Scuderia Ferrari). Penske hired David Stremme to race the car in a largely unbranded fashion for 2009, but he did not produce results and was fired toward the end of the season.

Brad Keselowski (2009–2010)

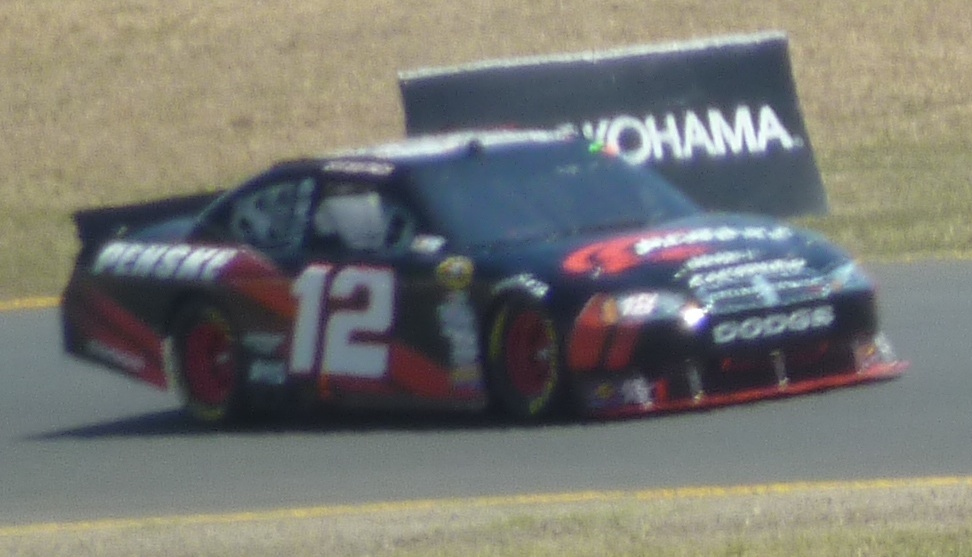
Brad Keselowski in the No. 12 during the 2010 Toyota/Save Mart 350.

Brad Keselowski, who had recently signed with Penske when he was unable to procure a seat at Hendrick Motorsports, took over the car toward the end of the 2009 season. He then ran the No. 12 full-time in 2010 unsponsored, although FloTV and AAA sponsored several races. Keselowski moved to the No. 2 car following the season to replace Kurt Busch, who moved to the new No. 22.

Part-time and hiatus (2011–2017)

The No. 12 did not run any races in 2011. In 2012, Sam Hornish Jr. drove the No. 12 at Kansas in April with SKF sponsorship. The No. 12 was also scheduled to run at the October Talladega race with Hornish, but after the termination of A. J. Allmendinger from the No. 22, Hornish replaced him full-time. Hornish's SKF sponsorship was transferred to the No. 22 for this race.

In 2013, Hornish again qualified at Kansas but crashed out of the race in a multi-car wreck. He attempted the fall Talladega race but failed to make the race after qualifying was rained out.

With Hornish leaving for Joe Gibbs Racing, the part-time No. 12 was split by various Penske drivers in 2014. SKF sponsored three races, with Ryan Blaney at Kansas in April and Talladega in October, and Juan Pablo Montoya at Michigan in June. Montoya also drove the No. 12 in the Brickyard 400 with sponsorship from Penske Truck Leasing.

Ryan Blaney (2018–present)

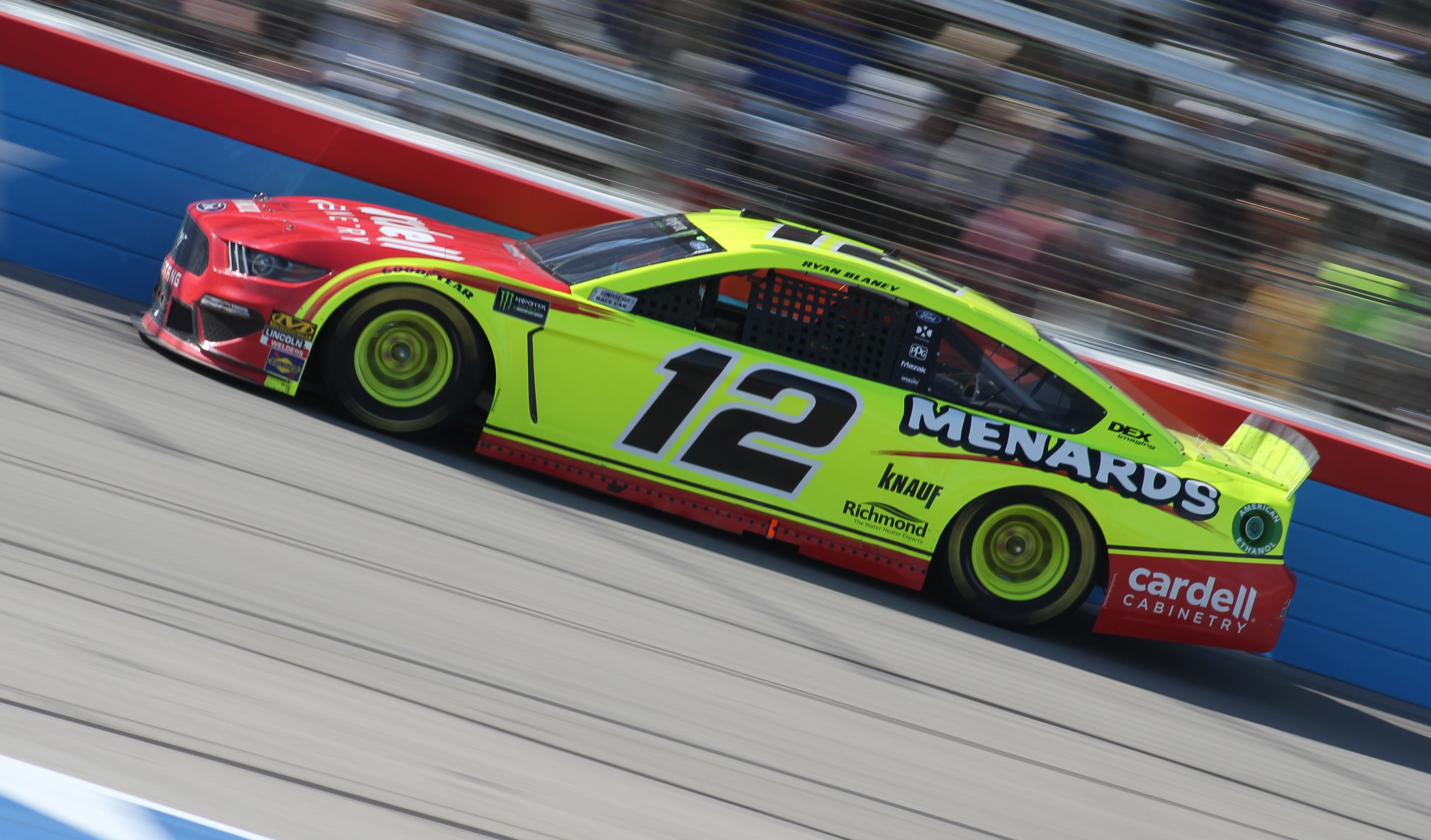
Ryan Blaney in the No. 12 at Texas Motor Speedway in 2019.

In June 2017, Penske implied that Blaney would soon drive a third Ford for Penske Racing. This was later confirmed a month later when they announced that Blaney would drive the No. 12 car in 2018, with Paul Menard replacing him in the No. 21 Wood Brothers Racing car, continuing the technical alliance that the two teams have. Team Penske purchased the No. 12's charter from Roush Fenway Racing, which had been leased to JTG Daugherty Racing a year prior.

Blaney started the 2018 season with a seventh-place finish at the Daytona 500 and stayed consistent with five top-fives and eleven top-tens before qualifying in the Playoffs. He scored his first win with Team Penske at the inaugural Charlotte Roval race after Jimmie Johnson and Martin Truex Jr. spun out before the finish line. Following the Kansas race, Blaney was eliminated after the Round of 12 of the Playoffs and finished the season tenth in points.

In 2019, Blaney finished 31st at the 2019 Daytona 500. Despite not scoring a win during the regular season, he stayed consistent with seven top-fives and twelve top-ten finishes to make the Playoffs. He won at Talladega, but was eliminated after the Round of 8 and finished the season seventh in points.

The 2020 season started for Blaney with a second-place finish at the 2020 Daytona 500, which saw him dueling with Ryan Newman on the final turn until late contact caused Newman to go airborne and collide with Corey LaJoie; Newman sustained injuries that sidelined him for three months. Blaney won once again at Talladega and scored eight top-fives and 11 top-10s to make his third Playoff appearance with Team Penske. He was eliminated after the Round of 16 and finished ninth in points.

In 2021, Blaney finished 30th at the 2021 Daytona 500. He scored wins at Atlanta, Michigan, and the Daytona night race, along with seven top-fives and 14 top-10 finishes to once again make the Playoffs. Blaney was eliminated after the Round of 8 and finished the season seventh in points.

Blaney started the 2022 season with a fourth place finish at the 2022 Daytona 500. Despite scoring no wins in the first 13 races, he stayed consistent with four top-fives and six top-10 finishes. He also won the 2022 NASCAR All-Star Race. Despite being involved in a multi-car crash on lap 31 of the regular season finale at the Daytona night race, Blaney rallied to finish 15th after avoiding The Big One to clinch the 16th and final Playoff spot of the season, beating Martin Truex Jr. by three points. Blaney was eliminated following the Round of 8 after finishing third at Martinsville. Despite being winless, he finished the season eighth in the points standings.

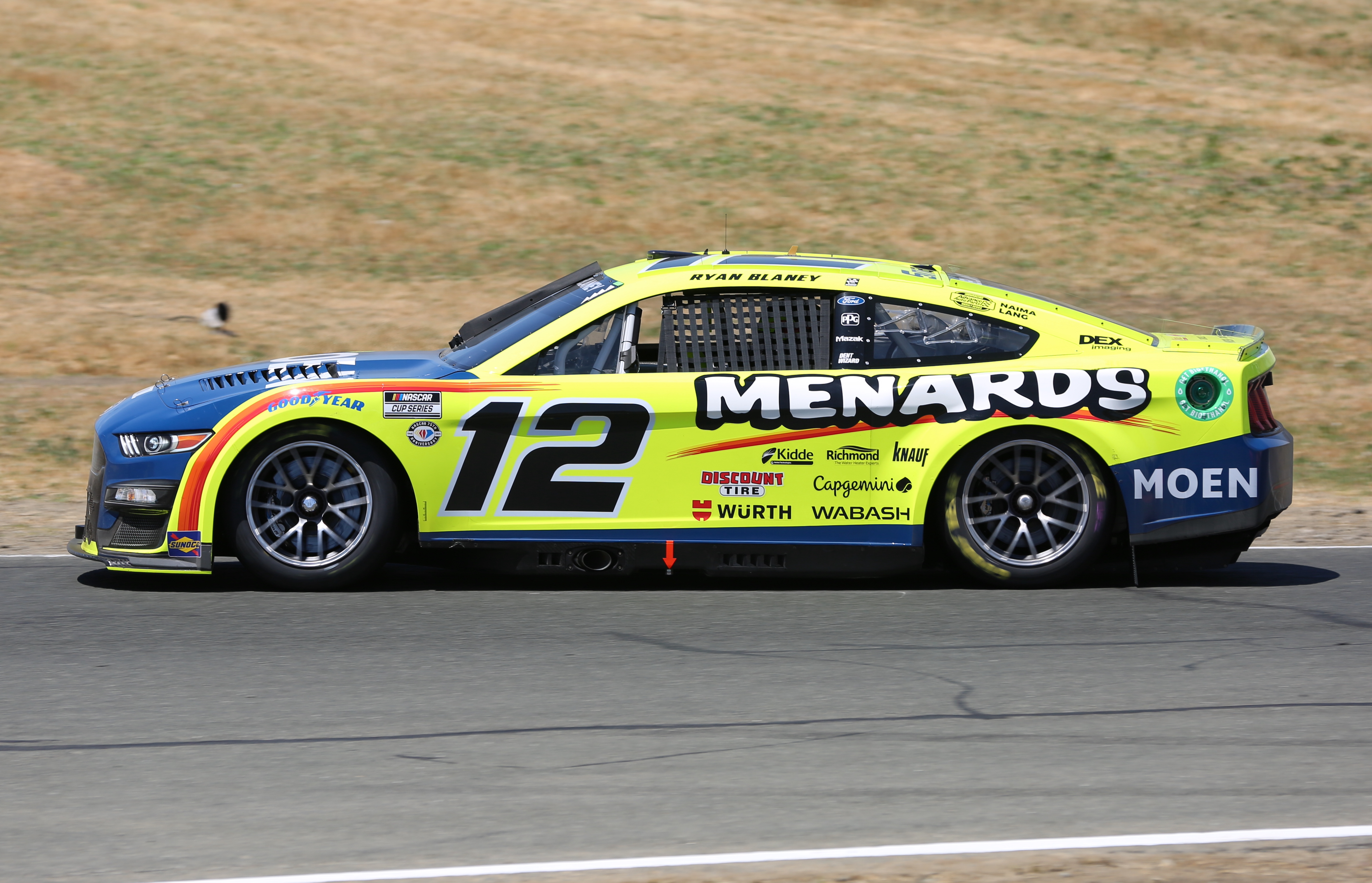
Ryan Blaney in the No. 12 at Sonoma Raceway in 2023

Blaney started the 2023 season with an eighth place finish at the 2023 Daytona 500. He broke a 59-race drought by winning the 2023 Coca-Cola 600. During the playoffs, Blaney scored his second win of the season at Talladega. He finished sixth at Las Vegas, but was disqualified after post-race inspection discovered a left-front damper that did not meet specifications; as a result, Blaney dropped to last-place and the bottom of the Round of 8 cutoff line. NASCAR later rescinded the penalty and restored Blaney's points after an issue was found with the damper template. Blaney won at Martinsville to make the Championship 4. He finished second at Phoenix to win the 2023 championship.

Blaney started the 2024 season with a 30th place DNF at the 2024 Daytona 500. At Atlanta, he was leading the last lap but ultimately finished in second and came 0.003 seconds short of beating Daniel Suárez in a three-wide photo finish between him, Suárez, and Kyle Busch. Blaney once again fell short of a victory at Gateway after running out of fuel on the last lap; his teammate Austin Cindric ended up winning the race. On June 16, He scored his first win of the season at the inaugural Iowa race. A month later, he won at Pocono. During the playoffs, Blaney won at Martinsville to make the Championship 4 for a second year in a row, but lost to teammate Joey Logano.

Blaney started the 2025 season with a seventh place finish at the 2025 Daytona 500. He scored his first win of the season at Nashville. He ended the regular season with a win at the Daytona summer race, edging out Daniel Suárez by 0.031 seconds. During the playoffs, he won at New Hampshire. Despite being eliminated at the conclusion of the Round of 8, Blaney finished the season with a win at Phoenix and sixth in the points standings.

Blaney started the 2026 season with a 27th place DNF at the 2026 Daytona 500. Three weeks later, he scored his first win of the season at Phoenix. He scored his second win of the season at Atlanta after winning the pole and led most of the lap. His third win of the season came as his second-straight win at New Hampshire. Blaney finished the season with a win at Homestead and fourth in the points standings.

==== Car No. 12 results ====
| Year | Driver | No. | Make | 1 | 2 | 3 | 4 | 5 | 6 | 7 | 8 | 9 | 10 | 11 | 12 | 13 | 14 | 15 | 16 | 17 | 18 | 19 | 20 | 21 | 22 | 23 | 24 | 25 | 26 | 27 | 28 | 29 | 30 | 31 | 32 | 33 | 34 | 35 | 36 | Owners | Pts |
|---|---|---|---|---|---|---|---|---|---|---|---|---|---|---|---|---|---|---|---|---|---|---|---|---|---|---|---|---|---|---|---|---|---|---|---|---|---|---|---|---|---|
| 1998 | Jeremy Mayfield | 12 | Ford | DAY; 3 | CAR; 14 | LVS; 5 | ATL; 3 | DAR; 4 | BRI; 12 | TEX; 23* | MAR; 7 | TAL; 13 | CAL; 2 | CLT; 19 | DOV; 5 | RCH; 6 | MCH; 5 | POC; 1* | SON; 18 | NHA; 30 | POC; 18 | IND; 42 | GLN; 31 | MCH; 7 | BRI; 8 | NHA; 20 | DAR; 5 | RCH; 22 | DOV; 3 | MAR; 23 | CLT; 25 | TAL; 5 | DAY; 4 | PHO; 42 | CAR; 29 | ATL; 15 | | | | 7th | 4157 |
| 1999 | Jeremy Mayfield | 12 | Ford | DAY; 20 | CAR; 5 | LVS; 17 | ATL; 36 | DAR; 2 | TEX; 5 | BRI; 27 | MAR; 41 | TAL; 15 | CAL; 7 | RCH; 24 | CLT; 10 | DOV; 9 | MCH; 17 | POC; 9 | SON; 7 | DAY; 25 | NHA; 28 | POC; 35 | IND; 29 | GLN; 34 | MCH; 18 | BRI; 32 | DAR; 3 | RCH; 25 | NHA; 36 | DOV; 22 | MAR; 15 | CLT; 6 | TAL; 16 | CAR; 9 | PHO; 41 | HOM; 13 | ATL; 3 | | | 11th | 3743 |
| 2000 | Jeremy Mayfield | 12 | Ford | DAY; 11 | CAR; 7 | LVS; 17 | ATL; 28 | DAR; 34 | BRI; 4 | TEX; 6 | MAR; 7 | TAL; 14 | CAL; 1 | RCH; 36 | CLT; 6 | DOV; 37 | MCH; 41* | POC; 1 | SON; 33 | DAY; 43 | NHA; 8 | POC; 10 | | | MCH; 13 | BRI; 35 | DAR; 41* | RCH; 39 | NHA; 40 | DOV; 35 | MAR; 38 | CLT; 2 | TAL; 42 | CAR; 29* | PHO; 2 | HOM; 2 | ATL; 41 | | | 20th | 3287 |
| 2000 | Kyle Petty | 12 | Ford | | | | | | | | | | | | | | | | | | | | IND; 32 | | | | | | | | | | | | | | | | | 20th | 3287 |
| 2000 | Tom Hubert | 12 | Ford | | | | | | | | | | | | | | | | | | | | | GLN; 33 | | | | | | | | | | | | | | | | 20th | 3287 |
| 2001 | Jeremy Mayfield | 12 | Ford | DAY; 9 | CAR; 38 | LVS; 42 | ATL; 38 | DAR; 3 | BRI; 3 | TEX; 22 | MAR; 30 | TAL; 35 | CAL; 5 | RCH; 36 | CLT; 10 | DOV; 34 | MCH; 4 | POC; 36 | SON; 39 | DAY; 17 | CHI; 32 | NHA; 39 | POC; 18 | IND; 18 | GLN; 3 | MCH; 13 | BRI; 16 | DAR; 13 | RCH; 29 | DOV; 42 | KAN; 36 | | | | | | | | | 19th | 3488 |
| 2001 | Mike Wallace | 12 | Ford | | | | | | | | | | | | | | | | | | | | | | | | | | | | | CLT; 34 | MAR; 8 | TAL; 18 | PHO; 2 | CAR; 32 | HOM; 26 | ATL; 13 | NHA; 33 | 19th | 3488 |
| 2002 | Ryan Newman | 12 | Ford | DAY; 7 | CAR; 14 | LVS; 4 | ATL; 10 | DAR; 5 | BRI; 37 | TEX; 40 | MAR; 41 | TAL; 43 | CAL; 14 | RCH; 2 | CLT; 41 | DOV; 4 | POC; 32 | MCH; 3 | SON; 9 | DAY; 27 | CHI; 5* | NHA; 5 | POC; 5 | IND; 4 | GLN; 2 | MCH; 31 | BRI; 36 | DAR; 2 | RCH; 2* | NHA; 1* | DOV; 8 | KAN; 2 | TAL; 7 | CLT; 8 | MAR; 15 | ATL; 10 | CAR; 23 | PHO; 18 | HOM; 6 | 6th | 4593 |
| 2003 | Ryan Newman | 12 | Dodge | DAY; 43 | CAR; 14 | LVS; 7 | ATL; 10 | DAR; 14 | BRI; 22 | TEX; 1 | TAL; 39 | MAR; 38 | CAL; 42 | RCH; 39 | CLT; 5 | DOV; 1* | POC; 5 | MCH; 41 | SON; 5 | DAY; 22 | CHI; 1 | NHA; 4 | POC; 1* | IND; 11 | GLN; 9 | MCH; 1 | BRI; 6 | DAR; 23* | RCH; 1 | NHA; 9 | DOV; 1 | TAL; 4 | KAN; 1 | CLT; 2 | MAR; 5 | ATL; 29 | PHO; 3 | CAR; 5 | HOM; 37 | 6th | 4711 |
| 2004 | Ryan Newman | 12 | Dodge | DAY; 31 | CAR; 6 | LVS; 27 | ATL; 5 | DAR; 3 | BRI; 7 | TEX; 39 | MAR; 5 | TAL; 11 | CAL; 3 | RCH; 9 | CLT; 35 | DOV; 24 | POC; 30 | MCH; 1 | SON; 14 | DAY; 12 | CHI; 34 | NHA; 3* | POC; 13 | IND; 31 | GLN; 26 | MCH; 14 | BRI; 2 | CAL; 5 | RCH; 20 | NHA; 33 | DOV; 1* | TAL; 16 | KAN; 33 | CLT; 14 | MAR; 3 | ATL; 17 | PHO; 2 | DAR; 34 | HOM; 30 | 7th | 6180 |
| 2005 | Ryan Newman | 12 | Dodge | DAY; 20 | CAL; 9 | LVS; 9 | ATL; 14 | BRI; 30 | MAR; 4 | TEX; 16 | PHO; 14 | TAL; 39 | DAR; 5 | RCH; 3 | CLT; 5 | DOV; 8 | POC; 34 | MCH; 15 | SON; 9 | DAY; 14 | CHI; 29 | NHA; 7 | POC; 5 | IND; 34 | GLN; 30 | MCH; 12 | BRI; 39 | CAL; 18 | RCH; 12 | NHA; 1 | DOV; 5 | TAL; 4 | KAN; 23 | CLT; 7 | MAR; 10 | ATL; 23 | TEX; 25 | PHO; 12 | HOM; 7 | 6th | 6359 |
| 2006 | Ryan Newman | 12 | Dodge | DAY; 3 | CAL; 20 | LVS; 43 | ATL; 18 | BRI; 9 | MAR; 18 | TEX; 40 | PHO; 39 | TAL; 33 | RCH; 8 | DAR; 6 | CLT; 35 | DOV; 14 | POC; 11 | MCH; 15 | SON; 2 | DAY; 11 | CHI; 36 | NHA; 39 | POC; 18 | IND; 13 | GLN; 8 | MCH; 25 | BRI; 8 | CAL; 33 | RCH; 20 | NHA; 12 | DOV; 24 | KAN; 24 | TAL; 13 | CLT; 27 | MAR; 13 | ATL; 30 | TEX; 34 | PHO; 15 | HOM; 23 | 18th | 3748 |
| 2007 | Ryan Newman | 12 | Dodge | DAY; 38 | CAL; 12 | LVS; 8 | ATL; 23 | BRI; 39 | MAR; 14 | TEX; 32 | PHO; 38 | TAL; 9 | RCH; 6 | DAR; 4 | CLT; 39 | DOV; 2 | POC; 2 | MCH; 37 | SON; 20 | NHA; 10 | DAY; 14 | CHI; 8 | IND; 42 | POC; 7 | GLN; 13 | MCH; 16 | BRI; 7 | CAL; 39 | RCH; 11 | NHA; 9 | DOV; 28 | KAN; 43 | TAL; 5 | CLT; 28 | MAR; 2 | ATL; 37 | TEX; 5 | PHO; 5 | HOM; 18 | 13th | 4046 |
| 2008 | Ryan Newman | 12 | Dodge | DAY; 1 | CAL; 10 | LVS; 14 | ATL; 14 | BRI; 33 | MAR; 19 | TEX; 4 | PHO; 43 | TAL; 8 | RCH; 6 | DAR; 37 | CLT; 21 | DOV; 14 | POC; 18 | MCH; 42 | SON; 7 | NHA; 15 | DAY; 36 | CHI; 10 | IND; 13 | POC; 14 | GLN; 26 | MCH; 21 | BRI; 6 | CAL; 16 | RCH; 33 | NHA; 36 | DOV; 13 | KAN; 16 | TAL; 43 | CLT; 21 | MAR; 23 | ATL; 16 | TEX; 28 | PHO; 34 | HOM; 21 | 17th | 3735 |
| 2009 | David Stremme | 12 | Dodge | DAY; 33 | CAL; 13 | LVS; 18 | ATL; 23 | BRI; 19 | MAR; 22 | TEX; 14 | PHO; 18 | TAL; 31 | RCH; 38 | DAR; 24 | CLT; 22 | DOV; 31 | POC; 34 | MCH; 38 | SON; 39 | NHA; 28 | DAY; 35 | CHI; 26 | IND; 16 | POC; 32 | GLN; 26 | MCH; 13 | BRI; 20 | ATL; 14 | RCH; 26 | NHA; 28 | DOV; 29 | KAN; 25 | CAL; 16 | CLT; 19 | MAR; 33 | TAL; 22 | | | | 31st | 3117 |
| 2009 | Brad Keselowski | 12 | Dodge | | | | | | | | | | | | | | | | | | | | | | | | | | | | | | | | | | TEX; 35 | PHO; 37 | HOM; 25 | 31st | 3117 |
| 2010 | Brad Keselowski | 12 | Dodge | DAY; 36 | CAL; 21 | LVS; 26 | ATL; 36 | BRI; 13 | MAR; 12 | PHO; 16 | TEX; 14 | TAL; 34 | RCH; 14 | DAR; 12 | DOV; 18 | CLT; 20 | POC; 21 | MCH; 27 | SON; 35 | NHA; 26 | DAY; 30 | CHI; 18 | IND; 19 | POC; 20 | GLN; 20 | MCH; 34 | BRI; 19 | ATL; 25 | RCH; 15 | NHA; 18 | DOV; 22 | KAN; 23 | CAL; 26 | CLT; 27 | MAR; 10 | TAL; 10 | TEX; 33 | PHO; 42 | HOM; 13 | 25th | 3485 |
| 2012 | Sam Hornish Jr. | 12 | Dodge | DAY | PHO | LVS | BRI | CAL | MAR | TEX | KAN; 19 | RCH | TAL | DAR | CLT | DOV | POC | MCH | SON | KEN | DAY | NHA | IND | POC | GLN | MCH | BRI | ATL | RCH | CHI | NHA | DOV | TAL | CHA | KAN | MAR | TEX | PHO | HOM | 48th | 25 |
| 2013 | Sam Hornish Jr. | 12 | Ford | DAY | PHO | LVS | BRI | CAL | MAR | TEX | KAN; 37 | RCH | TAL | DAR | CLT | DOV | POC | MCH | SON | KEN | DAY | NHA | IND | POC | GLN | MCH | BRI | ATL | RCH | CHI | NHA | DOV | KAN | CLT | TAL; DNQ | MAR | TEX | PHO | HOM | 68th | 7 |
| 2014 | Ryan Blaney | 12 | Ford | DAY | PHO | LVS | BRI | CAL | MAR | TEX | DAR | RCH | TAL | KAN; 27 | CLT | DOV | POC | | | | | | | | | | | | | | | | | | TAL; 22 | MAR | TEX | PHO | HOM | 48th | 87 |
| 2014 | Juan Pablo Montoya | 12 | Ford | | | | | | | | | | | | | | | MCH; 18 | SON | KEN | DAY | NHA | IND; 23 | POC | GLN | MCH | BRI | ATL | RCH | CHI | NHA | DOV | KAN | CLT | | | | | | 48th | 87 |
| 2018 | Ryan Blaney | 12 | Ford | DAY; 7* | ATL; 12 | LVS; 5 | PHO; 16 | CAL; 8 | MAR; 3 | TEX; 5 | BRI; 35 | RCH; 22 | TAL; 18 | DOV; 8 | KAN; 37 | CLT; 36 | POC; 6 | MCH; 8 | SON; 34 | CHI; 18 | DAY; 40 | KEN; 2 | NHA; 7 | POC; 12 | GLN; 12 | MCH; 5 | BRI; 7* | DAR; 15 | IND; 11 | LVS; 5 | RCH; 19 | CLT; 1 | DOV; 11 | TAL; 29 | KAN; 7 | MAR; 20 | TEX; 2 | PHO; 34 | HOM; 17 | 10th | 2298 |
| 2019 | Ryan Blaney | 12 | Ford | DAY; 31 | ATL; 22 | LVS; 22 | PHO; 3 | CAL; 5 | MAR; 4 | TEX; 37 | BRI; 4* | RCH; 25 | TAL; 15 | DOV; 15 | KAN; 32 | CLT; 13 | POC; 12 | MCH; 9 | SON; 3 | CHI; 6 | DAY; 36 | KEN; 13 | NHA; 4 | POC; 10 | GLN; 5 | MCH; 24 | BRI; 10 | DAR; 13 | IND; 7 | LVS; 5 | RCH; 17 | CLT; 8 | DOV; 35 | TAL; 1* | KAN; 21 | MAR; 5 | TEX; 8 | PHO; 3 | HOM; 11 | 7th | 2339 |
| 2020 | Ryan Blaney | 12 | Ford | DAY; 2 | LVS; 11 | CAL; 19 | PHO; 37 | DAR; 16 | DAR; 21 | CLT; 3 | CLT; 3 | BRI; 40 | ATL; 4 | MAR; 2 | HOM; 3 | TAL; 1* | POC; 12 | POC; 22 | IND; 32 | KEN; 6 | TEX; 7* | KAN; 20 | NHA; 20 | MCH; 4 | MCH; 38 | DAY; 31 | DOV; 14 | DOV; 12 | DAY; 6 | DAR; 24 | RCH; 19 | BRI; 13 | LVS; 7 | TAL; 25 | CLT; 5 | KAN; 7 | TEX; 4 | MAR; 2 | PHO; 6 | 9th | 2336 |
| 2021 | Ryan Blaney | 12 | Ford | DAY; 30 | DAY; 15 | HOM; 29 | LVS; 5 | PHO; 10 | ATL; 1 | BRI; 8 | MAR; 11 | RCH; 11 | TAL; 9 | KAN; 21 | DAR; 8 | DOV; 12 | COA; 17 | CLT; 13 | SON; 10 | NSH; 37 | POC; 5 | POC; 6 | ROA; 20 | ATL; 5 | NHA; 5 | GLN; 14 | IND; 2 | MCH; 1 | DAY; 1 | DAR; 22 | RCH; 10 | BRI; 4 | LVS; 5 | TAL; 15 | CLT; 9 | TEX; 6 | KAN; 37 | MAR; 11 | PHO; 4 | 7th | 2350 |
| 2022 | Ryan Blaney | 12 | Ford | DAY; 4 | CAL; 18 | LVS; 36 | PHO; 4* | ATL; 17 | COA; 6 | RCH; 7* | MAR; 4 | BRI; 5 | TAL; 11 | DOV; 26 | DAR; 17 | KAN; 12 | CLT; 29 | GTW; 4 | SON; 6 | NSH; 3 | ROA; 11 | ATL; 5 | NHA; 18 | POC; 33 | IND; 26 | MCH; 5 | RCH; 10 | GLN; 24 | DAY; 15 | DAR; 13 | KAN; 9 | BRI; 30 | TEX; 4 | TAL; 2 | CLT; 26 | LVS; 28 | HOM; 17 | MAR; 3 | PHO; 2 | 8th | 1140 |
| 2023 | Ryan Blaney | 12 | Ford | DAY; 8 | CAL; 26 | LVS; 13 | PHO; 2 | ATL; 7 | COA; 21 | RCH; 26 | BRD; 23 | MAR; 7 | TAL; 2* | DOV; 3 | KAN; 16 | DAR; 9 | CLT; 1 | GTW; 6 | SON; 31 | NSH; 36 | CSC; 33 | ATL; 9 | NHA; 22 | POC; 30 | RCH; 14 | MCH; 9 | IRC; 13 | GLN; 9 | DAY; 36 | DAR; 9 | KAN; 12 | BRI; 22 | TEX; 28 | TAL; 1 | ROV; 12 | LVS; 6 | HOM; 2 | MAR; 1 | PHO; 2 | 1st | 5035 |
| 2024 | Ryan Blaney | 12 | Ford | DAY; 30 | ATL; 2 | LVS; 3 | PHO; 5 | BRI; 16 | COA; 12 | RCH; 19 | MAR; 5 | TEX; 33 | TAL; 20 | DOV; 7 | KAN; 12 | DAR; 36 | CLT; 39 | GTW; 24 | SON; 7 | IOW; 1* | NHA; 25 | NSH; 6 | CSC; 10 | POC; 1* | IND; 3 | RCH; 11 | MCH; 18 | DAY; 29 | DAR; 37 | ATL; 3 | GLN; 38 | BRI; 6 | KAN; 4 | TAL; 39 | ROV; 10 | LVS; 32 | HOM; 2 | MAR; 1 | PHO; 2 | 2nd | 5035 |
| 2025 | Ryan Blaney | 12 | Ford | DAY; 7 | ATL; 4 | COA; 19 | PHO; 28 | LVS; 35 | HOM; 36* | MAR; 11 | DAR; 5 | BRI; 5 | TAL; 37 | TEX; 3 | KAN; 3 | CLT; 38 | NSH; 1* | MCH; 32 | MXC; 14 | POC; 3 | ATL; 40 | CSC; 12 | SON; 36 | DOV; 8 | IND; 7 | IOW; 4 | GLN; 6 | RCH; 3 | DAY; 1* | DAR; 18 | GTW; 4 | BRI; 4 | NHA; 1 | KAN; 24 | ROV; 13 | LVS; 38 | TAL; 23 | MAR; 2 | PHO; 1 | 6th | 2373 |
| 2026 | Ryan Blaney | 12 | Ford | DAY; 27 | ATL; 10 | COA; 8 | PHO; 1 | LVS; 16 | DAR; 3 | MAR; 6 | BRI; 2 | KAN; 24 | TAL; 37 | TEX; 10 | GLN; 11 | CLT; 7 | NSH; 8 | MCH; 8 | POC; 10 | COR; 9* | SON; 6 | CHI; 7 | ATL; 1* | NWS; 14 | IND; 26 | IOW; 3* | RCH; 13 | NHA; 1* | DAY; 33 | DAR; 4 | GTW; 35 | BRI; 33* | KAN; 5 | LVS; 5 | CLT; 3 | PHO; 2 | TAL; 38 | MAR; 35 | HOM; 1 | 4th | 2407 |

=== Car No. 22 history ===
Kurt Busch (2011)

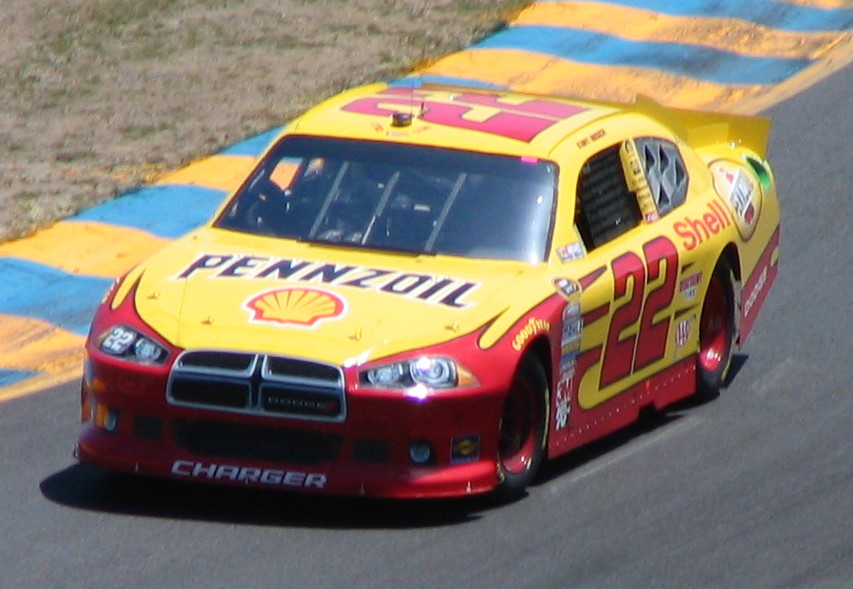
Kurt Busch in the No. 22 during the 2011 Toyota/Save Mart 350.

With the departure of Mobil 1 to Stewart–Haas Racing for the 2011 season, Shell and Pennzoil came over to Penske and sponsored the newly renumbered No. 22 Cup car in 2011 with Kurt Busch (who had previously driven the team's No. 2). The No. 22 shared the Shell sponsorship with Penske's IndyCar driver Hélio Castroneves. The team won two races at Sonoma and Dover and made the Chase, but poor finishes during the Chase left Busch eleventh in points. Busch and Penske Racing agreed to mutually part December 5, 2011. though there was strong speculation that he was fired for an incident involving reporter Jerry Punch that was caught on amateur video.

A. J. Allmendinger and Sam Hornish Jr. (2012)

On December 21, 2011, A. J. Allmendinger was announced as the driver for the 2012 season, moving over from Richard Petty Motorsports. He would team up with newly promoted crew chief Todd Gordon after the departure of Steve Addington to Stewart–Haas Racing. Allmendinger got off to a slow start to the season but took advantage of a late wreck among the leaders to finish second at Martinsville. After he failed a drug test before the July Daytona race, he was removed from the car. Penske Nationwide series driver Sam Hornish Jr. was named as the replacement for the remainder of the season. Hornish challenged for a win at Watkins Glen, and ended up finishing fifth. After failing to record another top-10 finish, Penske removed him from the car at the season's end.

Joey Logano (2013–present)

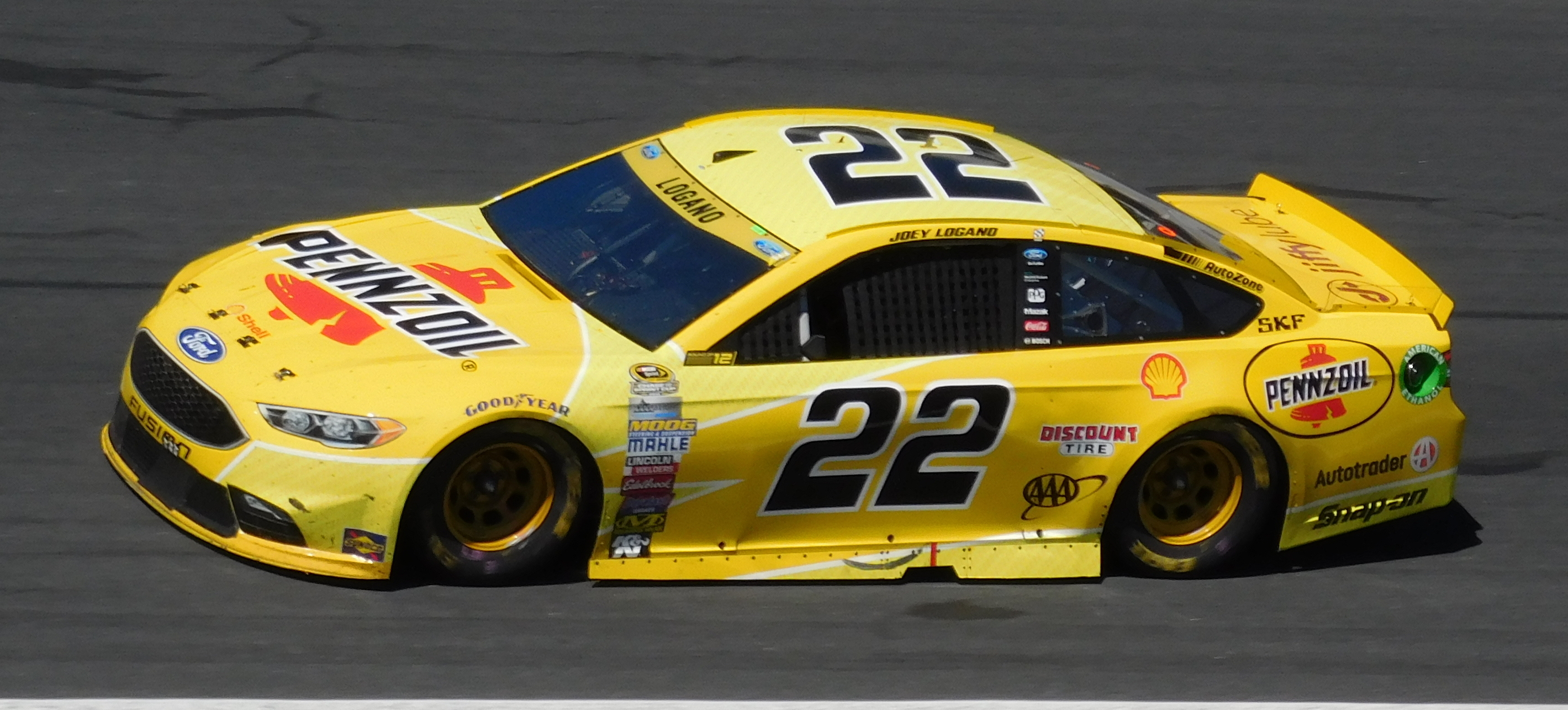
Joey Logano's 2016 Ford Fusion at Charlotte Motor Speedway

On September 4, 2012, Joey Logano was announced as Hornish's replacement in the No. 22 car in 2013. Logano became the fourth driver of the No. 22 in three years, but had a successful 2013 season, making the Chase, and returned in 2014, becoming the first driver to return to the No. 22 car for more than a single season. Logano won five races in 2014, two more than in his entire previous career, and made the Championship round of the revamped Chase, only to suffer pit road miscues at Homestead that relegated him to fourth in the standings.

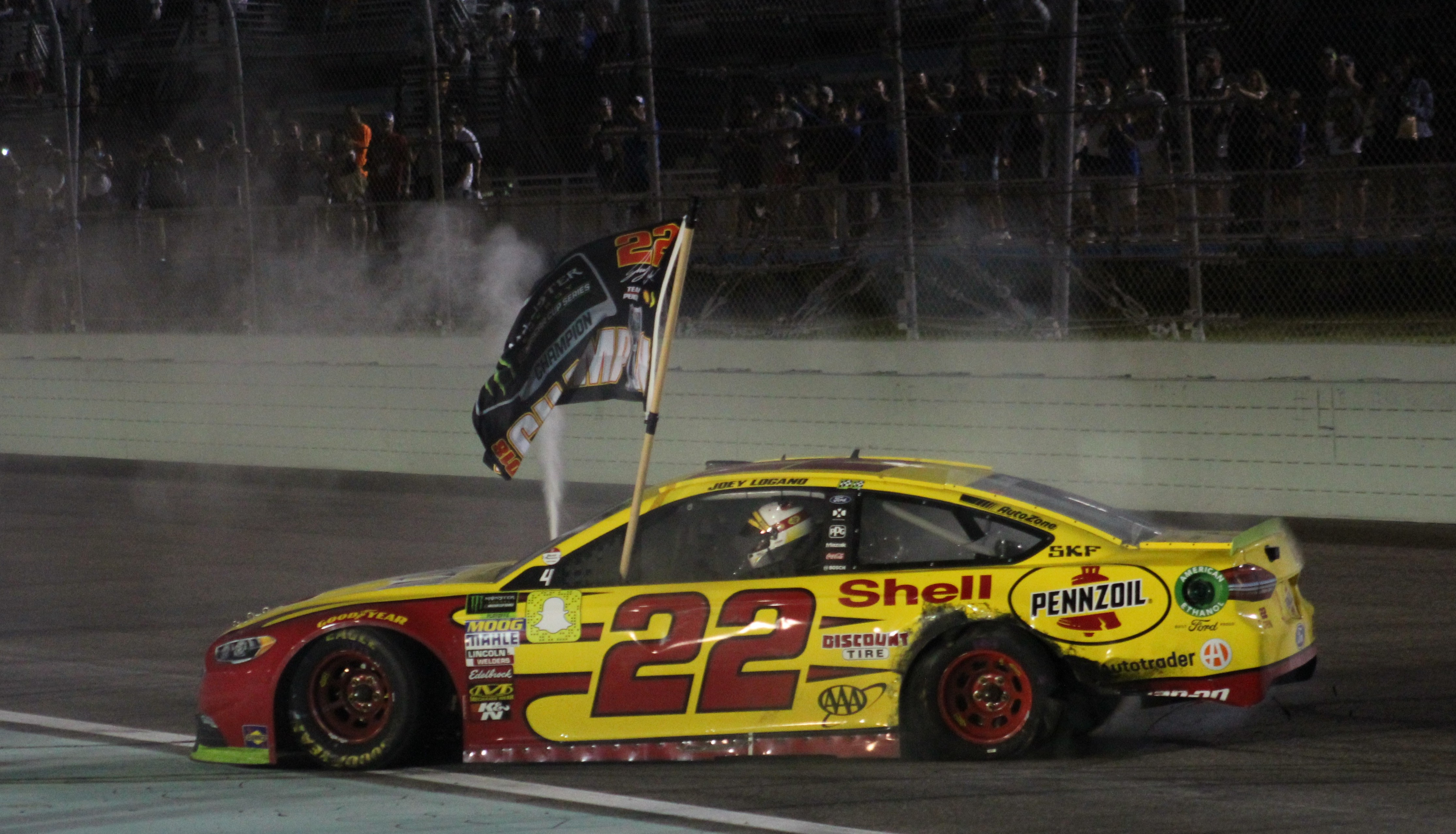
Joey Logano won the 2018 Monster Energy NASCAR Cup Series Championship.

Logano then began the 2015 season by winning the Daytona 500. He then won five further races, including repeat wins in the Bristol Night Race and the Kansas Chase race, part of a streak of three wins in a row that allowed him to sweep the Contender round of the 2015 Chase. However, a feud with Matt Kenseth derailed Logano's season when Kenseth wrecked him out of the lead at Martinsville; heavy damage from a blown tire the next week at Texas and his failure to win at Phoenix resulted in Logano's elimination from the Chase.

Logano's 2016 season saw him making it back to Homestead, this time with three wins (Michigan, Talladega, Phoenix) with a shot to win the title. Logano was able to get past a late-race incident with Carl Edwards and finished second in the standings behind Jimmie Johnson.

Logano's 2017 run was a disappointment. He won the spring Richmond race, but the victory was encumbered after his car was revealed to have a rear suspension issue during post-race inspection. This was followed by a string of disappointing finishes, which resulted in Logano missing the Playoffs and finishing 17th in the standings.

The 2018 season saw the No. 22 returning to competitive form, winning the spring Talladega race and securing the team in the Playoffs. A win at the fall Martinsville race locked Logano in the Championship 4. Logano won the 2018 Ford EcoBoost 400 and became the 2018 Monster Energy NASCAR Cup Series Champion.

For the 2019 season, Logano scored wins at the Gander RV Duel 2 at Daytona and at Las Vegas. At Martinsville, Hamlin collided with Logano on turn four, squeezing Logano into the outside wall and causing him to lose a tire and spin out two laps later. Despite the damage, Logano finished eighth. After the race, Logano and Hamlin discussed the incident before Logano slapped Hamlin's right shoulder, sparking a fight between the two. NASCAR suspended Dave Nichols Jr., the No. 22 team's tire technician, for one race for pulling Hamlin down to the ground during the altercation. Logano was eliminated from the playoffs after the Round of 8 and finished the season fifth in points.

Logano started the 2020 season with a win at the first Daytona duel qualifying race but a crash ended his Daytona 500 with a 26th-place finish. He won the next race at Las Vegas and followed that up with another win in Phoenix. He was leading at the end of the race at Bristol but was involved in a crash with Chase Elliott. Logano went winless for the rest of the regular season but locked his spot in the Championship 4. He finished the season third in points.

In 2021, Logano finished 12th at the Daytona 500, but scored a second-place finish at the Daytona road race the following week. He then recorded his sole win of the season at the inaugural Bristol dirt race to lock himself in the playoffs. Logano was eliminated after the Round of 8 and finished the season eighth in points.

Logano began the 2022 season by winning the 2022 Busch Light Clash at The Coliseum. He scored his first win of the season at Darlington by punting William Byron to the wall with two laps to go, infuriating both Byron and the crowd. Logano scored his second win of the season at the inaugural Gateway race. During the playoffs, he won at Las Vegas to make the Championship 4. Logano dominated the Phoenix finale to claim his second Cup Series championship.

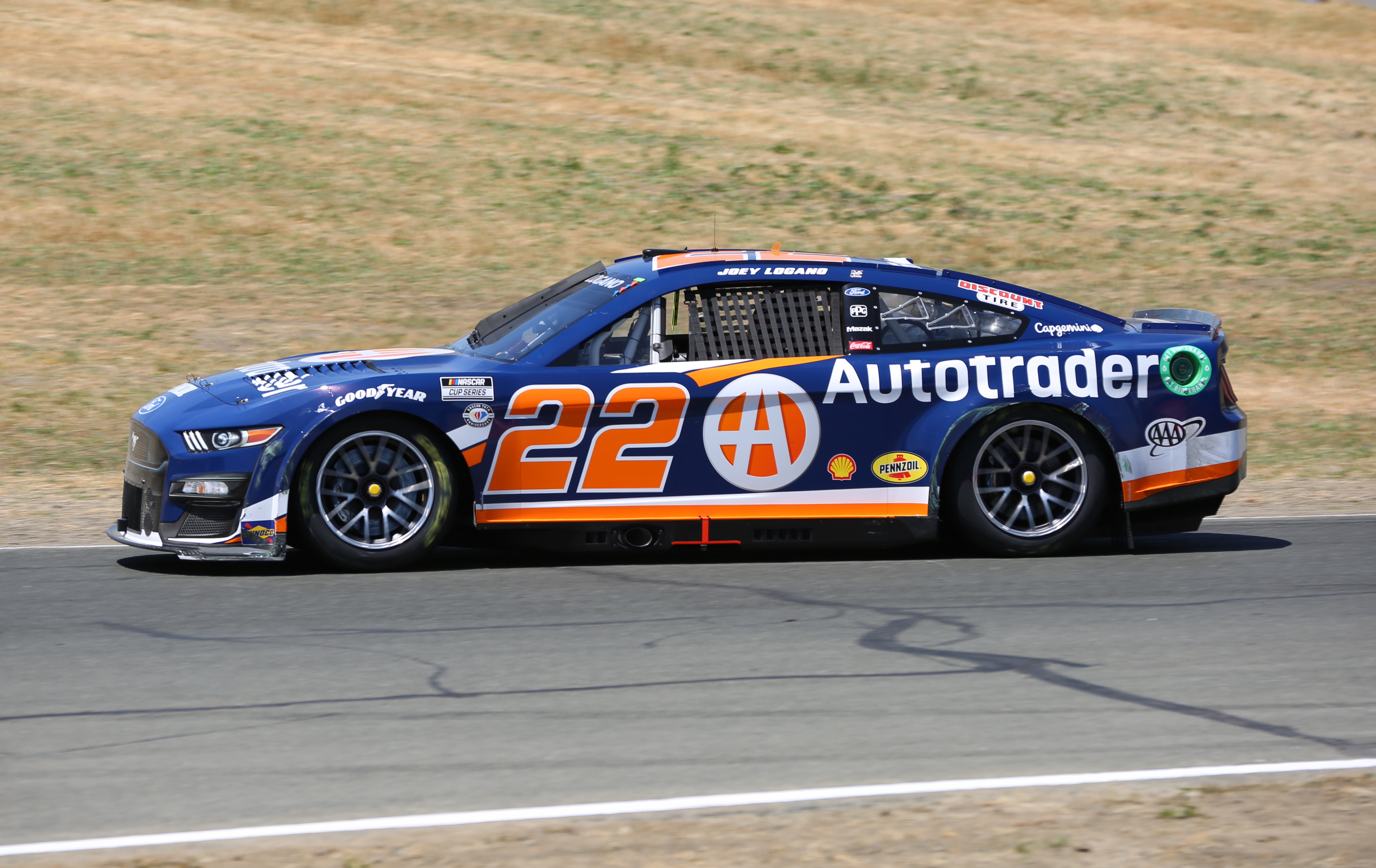
Joey Logano in the No. 22 at Sonoma Raceway in 2023

Logano started the 2023 season with a second place finish at the 2023 Daytona 500. He scored his first win of the season at Atlanta. During the playoffs, Logano was eliminated at the conclusion of the Round of 16.

Logano began the 2024 season with a 32nd place DNF at the 2024 Daytona 500. A week later, at the Atlanta race, he served a pass-through penalty for wearing unapproved safety gloves. Logano was later fined US$10,000 for the violation. He later won the 2024 NASCAR All-Star Race and US$1 million after leading 199 of the exhibition race's 200 laps. Logano scored his first win of the season at Nashville. At Richmond, he was leading the field on the final lap when Austin Dillon spun him out from behind. He was later fined US$50,000 when he spun his tires near the No. 3 pit box, nearly hitting members of Dillon's family in the process. During the playoffs, Logano won at Atlanta to advance to the Round of 12. He then won at Las Vegas to lock himself in the Championship 4. At Phoenix, he crossed the finish line first to win his third championship.

Logano started the 2025 season with a 35th place DNF at the 2025 Daytona 500. At Talladega, he finished fifth, but was disqualified after post-race inspection revealed the spoiler was missing a bolt. Logano rebounded a week later at Texas.

Logano started the 2026 season with a 3rd-place finish at the 2026 Daytona 500. At Atlanta, Logano broke Richard Petty's record for the most consecutive drafting-track races, which had been held for 47 years. At North Wilkesboro, Logano broke a 45-race winless streak by winning the first points-paying race at the track since 1996. He scored his second win of the season at Richmond. His third win of the season came during "The Chase" at Bristol night race.

==== Car No. 22 results ====
| Year | Driver | No. | Make | 1 | 2 | 3 | 4 | 5 | 6 | 7 | 8 | 9 | 10 | 11 | 12 | 13 | 14 | 15 | 16 | 17 | 18 | 19 | 20 | 21 | 22 | 23 | 24 | 25 | 26 | 27 | 28 | 29 | 30 | 31 | 32 | 33 | 34 | 35 | 36 | Owners | Pts |
|---|---|---|---|---|---|---|---|---|---|---|---|---|---|---|---|---|---|---|---|---|---|---|---|---|---|---|---|---|---|---|---|---|---|---|---|---|---|---|---|---|---|
| 2011 | Kurt Busch | 22 | Dodge | DAY; 5 | PHO; 8 | LVS; 9 | BRI; 7 | CAL; 17 | MAR; 16 | TEX; 10 | TAL; 18 | RCH; 22 | DAR; 27 | DOV; 14 | CLT; 4 | KAN; 9 | POC; 2 | MCH; 11 | SON; 1 | DAY; 14 | KEN; 9 | NHA; 10 | IND; 21 | POC; 3 | GLN; 38 | MCH; 34 | BRI; 17 | ATL; 4 | RCH; 5 | CHI; 6 | NHA; 22 | DOV; 1 | KAN; 13 | CLT; 13 | TAL; 36 | MAR; 14 | TEX; 30 | PHO; 22 | HOM; 34 | 11th | 2262 |
| 2012 | A. J. Allmendinger | 22 | Dodge | DAY; 34 | PHO; 18 | LVS; 37 | BRI; 17 | CAL; 15 | MAR; 2 | TEX; 15 | KAN; 32 | RCH; 16 | TAL; 15 | DAR; 33 | CLT; 33 | DOV; 16 | POC; 31 | MCH; 19 | SON; 9 | KEN; 9 | | | | | | | | | | | | | | | | | | | | 24th | 717 |
| 2012 | Sam Hornish Jr. | 22 | Dodge | | | | | | | | | | | | | | | | | | DAY; 33 | NHA; 22 | IND; 16 | POC; 19 | GLN; 5 | MCH; 12 | BRI; 34 | ATL; 11 | RCH; 11 | CHI; 11 | NHA; 21 | DOV; 25 | TAL; 24 | CLT; 15 | KAN; 26 | MAR; 13 | TEX; 17 | PHO; 31 | HOM; 22 | 24th | 717 |
| 2013 | Joey Logano | 22 | Ford | DAY; 19 | PHO; 26 | LVS; 12 | BRI; 17 | CAL; 3 | MAR; 23 | TEX; 5 | KAN; 39 | RCH; 3 | TAL; 35 | DAR; 22 | CLT; 5 | DOV; 7 | POC; 10 | MCH; 9 | SON; 11 | KEN; 4 | DAY; 40 | NHA; 40 | IND; 8 | POC; 7 | GLN; 7 | MCH; 1* | BRI; 5 | ATL; 2* | RCH; 22 | CHI; 37 | NHA; 14 | DOV; 3 | KAN; 4 | CLT; 18 | TAL; 16 | MAR; 14 | TEX; 3 | PHO; 9 | HOM; 8 | 8th | 2323 |
| 2014 | Joey Logano | 22 | Ford | DAY; 11 | PHO; 4 | LVS; 4 | BRI; 20 | CAL; 39 | MAR; 4 | TEX; 1* | DAR; 35 | RCH; 1 | TAL; 32 | KAN; 4 | CLT; 12 | DOV; 8 | POC; 40 | MCH; 10 | SON; 16 | KEN; 9 | DAY; 17 | NHA; 40 | IND; 5 | POC; 3 | GLN; 6 | MCH; 3* | BRI; 1 | ATL; 14 | RCH; 6 | CHI; 4 | NHA; 1 | DOV; 4 | KAN; 1* | CLT; 4 | TAL; 11 | MAR; 5 | TEX; 12 | PHO; 6 | HOM; 16 | 4th | 5028 |
| 2015 | Joey Logano | 22 | Ford | DAY; 1 | ATL; 4 | LVS; 10 | PHO; 8 | CAL; 7 | MAR; 3 | TEX; 4 | BRI; 40 | RCH; 5 | TAL; 33 | KAN; 5 | CLT; 13 | DOV; 11 | POC; 4 | MCH; 5 | SON; 5 | DAY; 22 | KEN; 2 | NHA; 4 | IND; 2 | POC; 20* | GLN; 1 | MCH; 7 | BRI; 1 | DAR; 4 | RCH; 3 | CHI; 6 | NHA; 3 | DOV; 10 | CLT; 1* | KAN; 1 | TAL; 1 | MAR; 37* | TEX; 40 | PHO; 3 | HOM; 4 | 6th | 2360 |
| 2016 | Joey Logano | 22 | Ford | DAY; 6 | ATL; 12 | LVS; 2 | PHO; 18 | CAL; 4 | MAR; 11 | TEX; 3 | BRI; 10 | RCH; 8 | TAL; 25 | KAN; 38 | DOV; 22 | CLT; 9 | POC; 5 | MCH; 1* | SON; 3 | DAY; 4 | KEN; 39 | NHA; 3 | IND; 7 | POC; 37* | GLN; 2 | BRI; 10 | MCH; 10 | DAR; 5 | RCH; 10 | CHI; 2 | NHA; 11 | DOV; 6 | CLT; 36 | KAN; 3 | TAL; 1 | MAR; 9 | TEX; 2* | PHO; 1 | HOM; 4 | 2nd | 5037 |
| 2017 | Joey Logano | 22 | Ford | DAY; 6 | ATL; 6 | LVS; 4 | PHO; 31 | CAL; 5 | MAR; 4 | TEX; 3 | BRI; 5 | RCH; 1 | TAL; 32 | KAN; 37 | CLT; 21 | DOV; 25 | POC; 23 | MCH; 3 | SON; 12 | DAY; 35 | KEN; 8 | NHA; 37 | IND; 4 | POC; 27 | GLN; 24 | MCH; 28 | BRI; 13 | DAR; 18 | RCH; 2 | CHI; 7 | NHA; 10 | DOV; 15 | CLT; 26 | TAL; 4* | KAN; 21 | MAR; 24 | TEX; 7 | PHO; 12 | HOM; 6 | 17th | 930 |
| 2018 | Joey Logano | 22 | Ford | DAY; 4 | ATL; 6 | LVS; 7 | PHO; 19 | CAL; 5 | MAR; 6 | TEX; 6 | BRI; 9 | RCH; 4 | TAL; 1* | DOV; 13 | KAN; 3 | CLT; 22 | POC; 9 | MCH; 7 | SON; 19 | CHI; 8 | DAY; 39 | KEN; 10 | NHA; 9 | POC; 26 | GLN; 37 | MCH; 10 | BRI; 4 | DAR; 2 | IND; 13 | LVS; 4 | RCH; 14 | CLT; 10 | DOV; 3 | TAL; 5 | KAN; 8* | MAR; 1* | TEX; 3 | PHO; 37 | HOM; 1* | 1st | 5040 |
| 2019 | Joey Logano | 22 | Ford | DAY; 4 | ATL; 23 | LVS; 1 | PHO; 10 | CAL; 2 | MAR; 19 | TEX; 17 | BRI; 3 | RCH; 2 | TAL; 4 | DOV; 7 | KAN; 15 | CLT; 2 | POC; 7 | MCH; 1* | SON; 23 | CHI; 3 | DAY; 25 | KEN; 7 | NHA; 9 | POC; 13 | GLN; 23 | MCH; 17 | BRI; 16 | DAR; 14 | IND; 2 | LVS; 9* | RCH; 11 | CLT; 10 | DOV; 34 | TAL; 11 | KAN; 17 | MAR; 8 | TEX; 4 | PHO; 9 | HOM; 5 | 5th | 2380 |
| 2020 | Joey Logano | 22 | Ford | DAY; 26 | LVS; 1 | CAL; 12 | PHO; 1 | DAR; 18 | DAR; 6 | CLT; 13 | CLT; 6 | BRI; 21 | ATL; 10 | MAR; 4* | HOM; 27 | TAL; 17 | POC; 36 | POC; 24 | IND; 10 | KEN; 15 | TEX; 3 | KAN; 35 | NHA; 4 | MCH; 8 | MCH; 5 | DAY; 9 | DOV; 8 | DOV; 6 | DAY; 27* | DAR; 3 | RCH; 3 | BRI; 11 | LVS; 14 | TAL; 26* | CLT; 2 | KAN; 1 | TEX; 10 | MAR; 3 | PHO; 3 | 3rd | 5034 |
| 2021 | Joey Logano | 22 | Ford | DAY; 12 | DAY; 2 | HOM; 25 | LVS; 9 | PHO; 2* | ATL; 15 | BRI; 1 | MAR; 6 | RCH; 3 | TAL; 39 | KAN; 17 | DAR; 13 | DOV; 5 | COA; 3 | CLT; 17 | SON; 4 | NSH; 10 | POC; 7 | POC; 10 | ROA; 15 | ATL; 19 | NHA; 4 | GLN; 22 | IND; 34 | MCH; 33 | DAY; 23* | DAR; 8 | RCH; 5 | BRI; 11 | LVS; 11 | TAL; 3 | CLT; 7 | TEX; 30 | KAN; 9 | MAR; 10 | PHO; 11 | 8th | 2336 |
| 2022 | Joey Logano | 22 | Ford | DAY; 21 | CAL; 5 | LVS; 14 | PHO; 8 | ATL; 9 | COA; 31 | RCH; 17 | MAR; 2 | BRI; 3 | TAL; 32 | DOV; 29 | DAR; 1* | KAN; 17 | CLT; 20 | GTW; 1 | SON; 17 | NSH; 9 | ROA; 27 | ATL; 26 | NHA; 22 | POC; 20 | IND; 6 | MCH; 4 | RCH; 6* | GLN; 3 | DAY; 12 | DAR; 4 | KAN; 17 | BRI; 27 | TEX; 2 | TAL; 27 | CLT; 18 | LVS; 1 | HOM; 18 | MAR; 6 | PHO; 1* | 1st | 5040 |
| 2023 | Joey Logano | 22 | Ford | DAY; 2 | CAL; 10 | LVS; 36 | PHO; 11 | ATL; 1* | COA; 28 | RCH; 7 | BRD; 37 | MAR; 2 | TAL; 30 | DOV; 31 | KAN; 6 | DAR; 18 | CLT; 21 | GTW; 3 | SON; 3 | NSH; 19 | CSC; 8 | ATL; 17 | NHA; 2 | POC; 35 | RCH; 4 | MCH; 14 | IRC; 34 | GLN; 10 | DAY; 5 | DAR; 12 | KAN; 5 | BRI; 34 | TEX; 21 | TAL; 24* | ROV; 5 | LVS; 11 | HOM; 8 | MAR; 4 | PHO; 18 | 12th | 2258 |
| 2024 | Joey Logano | 22 | Ford | DAY; 32* | ATL; 28 | LVS; 9 | PHO; 34 | BRI; 22 | COA; 11 | RCH; 2 | MAR; 6 | TEX; 11 | TAL; 19 | DOV; 16 | KAN; 34 | DAR; 21 | CLT; 14 | GTW; 5 | SON; 21 | IOW; 6 | NHA; 32 | NSH; 1 | CSC; 23 | POC; 5 | IND; 34 | RCH; 19 | MCH; 33 | DAY; 31* | DAR; 8 | ATL; 1 | GLN; 15 | BRI; 28 | KAN; 14 | TAL; 33 | ROV; 8 | LVS; 1 | HOM; 28 | MAR; 10 | PHO; 1 | 1st | 5040 |
| 2025 | Joey Logano | 22 | Ford | DAY; 35 | ATL; 12* | COA; 24 | PHO; 13 | LVS; 15 | HOM; 14 | MAR; 8 | DAR; 13 | BRI; 24 | TAL; 39 | TEX; 1 | KAN; 9 | CLT; 17 | NSH; 4 | MCH; 22 | MXC; 21 | POC; 16 | ATL; 36* | CSC; 11 | SON; 9 | DOV; 14 | IND; 32 | IOW; 9 | GLN; 14 | RCH; 4 | DAY; 27* | DAR; 20 | GTW; 5 | BRI; 5 | NHA; 4* | KAN; 21 | ROV; 20 | LVS; 6 | TAL; 16* | MAR; 8 | PHO; 4 | 7th | 2330 |
| 2026 | Joey Logano | 22 | Ford | DAY; 3 | ATL; 18 | COA; 15 | PHO; 31 | LVS; 15 | DAR; 34 | MAR; 3 | BRI; 7 | KAN; 30 | TAL; 39 | TEX; 37 | GLN; 38 | CLT; 8 | NSH; 14 | MCH; 7 | POC; 34 | COR; 18 | SON; 24 | CHI; 12 | ATL; 9 | NWS; 1* | IND; 3 | IOW; 14 | RCH; 1 | NHA; 14 | DAY; 18 | DAR; 9 | GTW; 3* | BRI; 1 | KAN; 20 | LVS; 10 | CLT; 9 | PHO; 6 | TAL; 34 | MAR; 18 | HOM; 17 | 7th | 2386 |

=== Car No. 33 history ===
Austin Cindric (2021)

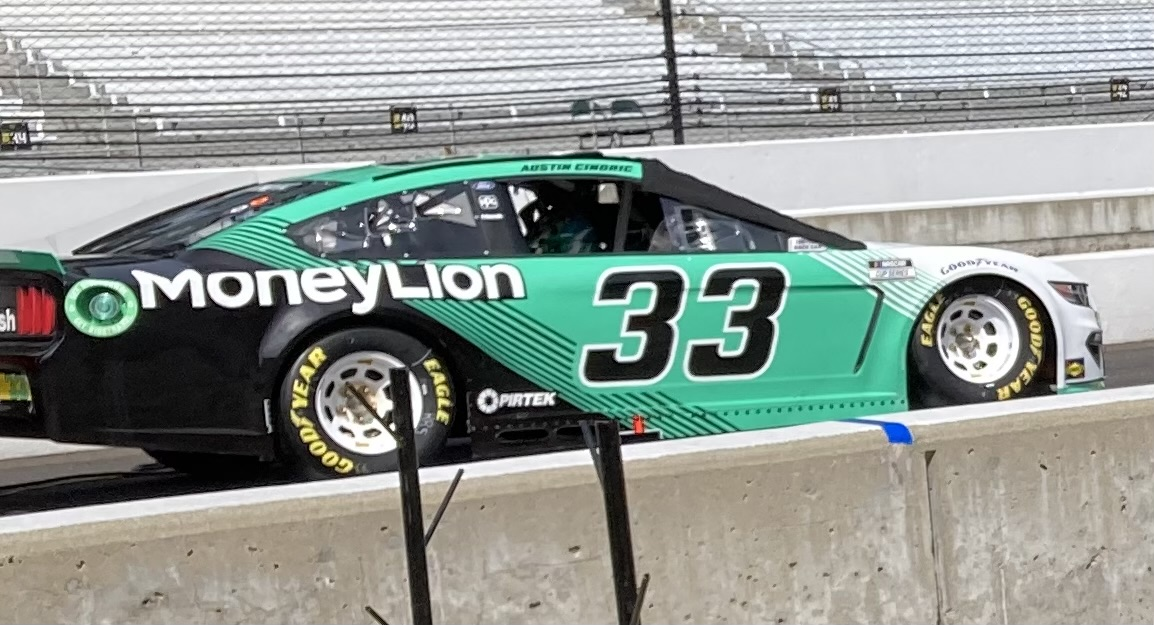
Austin Cindric’s #33 cup car at Indianapolis in 2021

In October 2020, Team Penske announced that Austin Cindric would begin racing in the Cup Series in 2021 on a part-time basis before moving to a full-time ride with Team Penske, driving the 2 car in 2022. As part of his limited 2021 schedule, he entered the Daytona 500 in a fourth Penske entry with the No. 33 and sponsorship from Verizon 5G.

==== Car No. 33 results ====
| Year | Driver | No. | Make | 1 | 2 | 3 | 4 | 5 | 6 | 7 | 8 | 9 | 10 | 11 | 12 | 13 | 14 | 15 | 16 | 17 | 18 | 19 | 20 | 21 | 22 | 23 | 24 | 25 | 26 | 27 | 28 | 29 | 30 | 31 | 32 | 33 | 34 | 35 | 36 | Owners | Pts |
|---|---|---|---|---|---|---|---|---|---|---|---|---|---|---|---|---|---|---|---|---|---|---|---|---|---|---|---|---|---|---|---|---|---|---|---|---|---|---|---|---|---|
| 2021 | Austin Cindric | 33 | Ford | DAY; 15 | DAY | HOM | LVS | PHO | ATL; 22 | BRI | MAR | RCH; 28 | TAL | KAN; 22 | DAR | DOV | COA; 25 | CLT | SON | NSH | POC | POC | ROA; 38 | ATL | NHA | GLN | IND; 9 | MCH | DAY | DAR | RCH | BRI | LVS | TAL | CLT | TEX | KAN | MAR | PHO | 39th | 121 |

=== Car No. 77 history ===
Brendan Gaughan (2004)

In 2004, Penske merged one of their teams with Jasper Motorsports, owned by Doug Bawel. As per the merger, Penske took 51% ownership of the No. 77 with Bawel as listed owner, and Brendan Gaughan was hired as the driver. The car was renumbered to No. 77, with Kodak sponsoring. Gaughan had four top-ten finishes and finished 28th in points in his rookie year, coming close to a victory at Watkins Glen in the summer of 2004. Although Gaughan impressed many as a rookie, Penske stunned the racing world by dismissing him at the season's end. Bawel would later say in an October 2019 interview that it was because Penske was not satisfied with Gaughan's progress in the sport.

Travis Kvapil (2005)

Gaughan was immediately replaced by Travis Kvapil in 2005. Kodak continued to sponsor the team, though Mobil 1 came on to sponsor one race. Kvapil had two top-tens and finished 33rd in points. The No. 77 team shut down for the next two years due to a lack of sponsorship.

Sam Hornish Jr. (2008–2010)

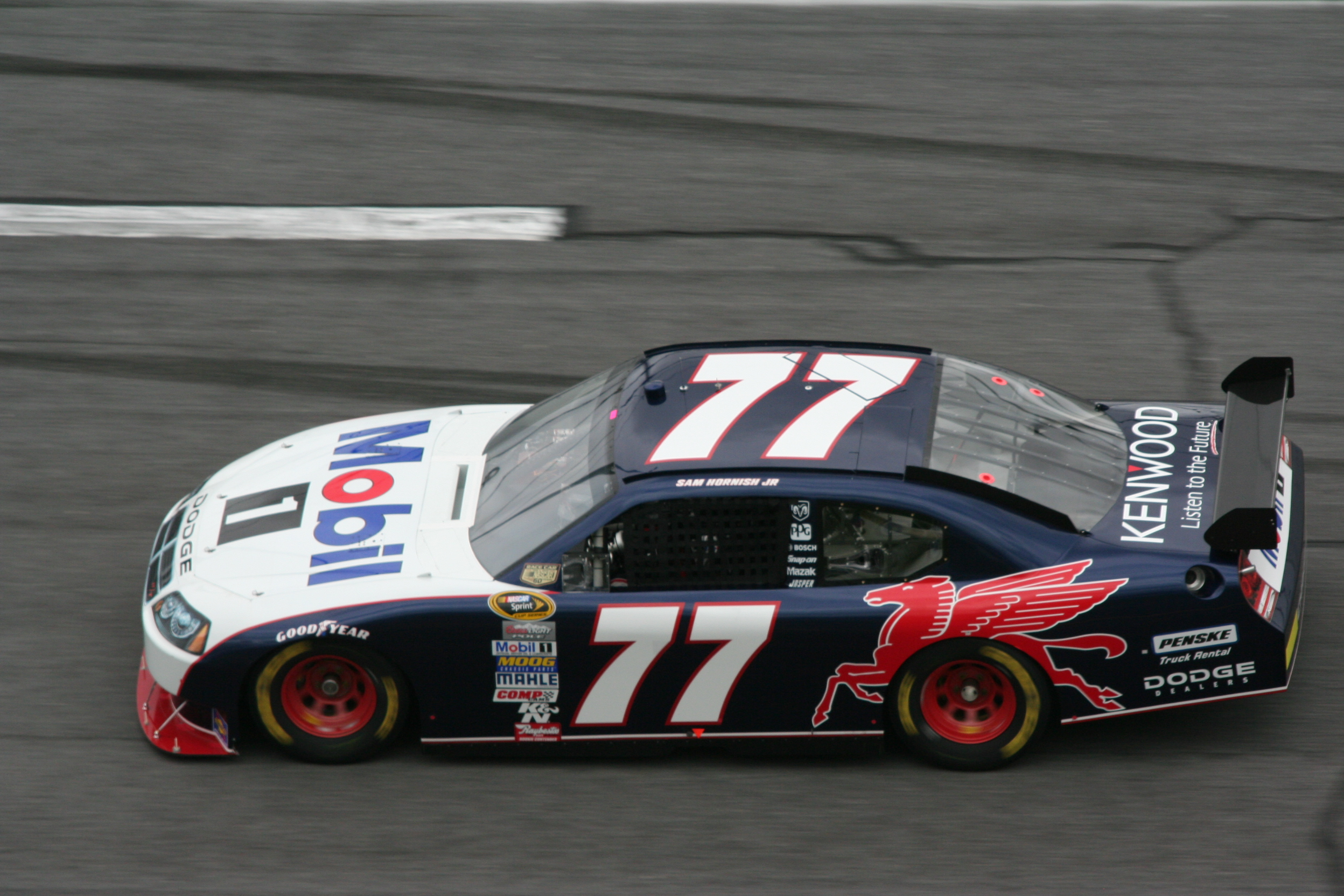
Sam Hornish Jr. in the No. 77 at Daytona in 2008.

In late 2007, Penske Racing announced that the No. 77 team would return to racing with Mobil 1 as a sponsor and that Sam Hornish Jr., one of Penske's IndyCar series drivers, would switch to NASCAR full-time and drive the car in 2008. The team underwent a points swap with Kurt Busch's No. 2 car to guarantee Hornish a spot in the first five races while allowing Busch to qualify automatically if necessary with his Past Champion's Provisional starts.

The team did the same in 2009 as Bill Davis (formerly of Bill Davis Racing) sold the owner points from his No. 22 Toyota to Penske, which guaranteed Hornish a spot in the first five races of the season. Hornish's performance improved enough this year that the No. 77 ended the year in the top 35 in owner points.

==== Car No. 77 results ====
| Year | Driver | No. | Make | 1 | 2 | 3 | 4 | 5 | 6 | 7 | 8 | 9 | 10 | 11 | 12 | 13 | 14 | 15 | 16 | 17 | 18 | 19 | 20 | 21 | 22 | 23 | 24 | 25 | 26 | 27 | 28 | 29 | 30 | 31 | 32 | 33 | 34 | 35 | 36 | Owners | Pts |
|---|---|---|---|---|---|---|---|---|---|---|---|---|---|---|---|---|---|---|---|---|---|---|---|---|---|---|---|---|---|---|---|---|---|---|---|---|---|---|---|---|---|
| 2004 | Brendan Gaughan | 77 | Dodge | DAY; 19 | CAR; 20 | LVS; 22 | ATL; 33 | DAR; 27 | BRI; 20 | TEX; 38 | MAR; 17 | TAL; 13 | CAL; 6 | RCH; 34 | CLT; 33 | DOV; 27 | POC; 39 | MCH; 16 | SON; 26 | DAY; 36 | CHI; 30 | NHA; 22 | POC; 28 | IND; 35 | GLN; 34 | MCH; 33 | BRI; 35 | CAL; 42 | RCH; 27 | NHA; 30 | DOV; 22 | TAL; 4 | KAN; 10 | CLT; 23 | MAR; 34 | ATL; 18 | PHO; 30 | DAR; 27 | HOM; 6 | 28th | 3165 |
| 2005 | Travis Kvapil | 77 | Dodge | DAY; 19 | CAL; 24 | LVS; 26 | ATL; 42 | BRI; 7 | MAR; 27 | TEX; 30 | PHO; 40 | TAL; 18 | DAR; 35 | RCH; 22 | CLT; 32 | DOV; 17 | POC; 17 | MCH; 26 | SON; 21 | DAY; 23 | CHI; 43 | NHA; 27 | POC; 38 | IND; 37 | GLN; 40 | MCH; 38 | BRI; 19 | CAL; 33 | RCH; 11 | NHA; 41 | DOV; 21 | TAL; 16 | KAN; 22 | CLT; 17 | MAR; 21 | ATL; 26 | TEX; 24 | PHO; 10 | HOM; 32 | 33rd | 3077 |
| 2008 | Sam Hornish Jr. | 77 | Dodge | DAY; 15 | CAL; 43 | LVS; 41 | ATL; 25 | BRI; 29 | MAR; 28 | TEX; 32 | PHO; 20 | TAL; 35 | RCH; 23 | DAR; 38 | CLT; 13 | DOV; 18 | POC; 42 | MCH; 22 | SON; 31 | NHA; 39 | DAY; 29 | CHI; 37 | IND; 21 | POC; 26 | GLN; 32 | MCH; 22 | BRI; 37 | CAL; 31 | RCH; 38 | NHA; 30 | DOV; 42 | KAN; 33 | TAL; DNQ | CLT; 22 | MAR; 34 | ATL; 24 | TEX; 23 | PHO; 33 | HOM; DNQ | 35th | 2523 |
| 2009 | Sam Hornish Jr. | 77 | Dodge | DAY; 32 | CAL; 23 | LVS; 16 | ATL; 37 | BRI; 31 | MAR; 34 | TEX; 17 | PHO; 9 | TAL; 34 | RCH; 6 | DAR; 30 | CLT; 16 | DOV; 13 | POC; 10 | MCH; 29 | SON; 38 | NHA; 8 | DAY; 32 | CHI; 38 | IND; 37 | POC; 4 | GLN; 35 | MCH; 5 | BRI; 35 | ATL; 35 | RCH; 8 | NHA; 37 | DOV; 26 | KAN; 18 | CAL; 12 | CLT; 40 | MAR; 36 | TAL; 40 | TEX; 40 | PHO; 17 | HOM; 21 | 28th | 3203 |
| 2010 | Sam Hornish Jr. | 77 | Dodge | DAY; 37 | CAL; 16 | LVS; 28 | ATL; 28 | BRI; 32 | MAR; 13 | PHO; 18 | TEX; 19 | TAL; 24 | RCH; 36 | DAR; 31 | DOV; 34 | CLT; 17 | POC; 11 | MCH; 26 | SON; 36 | NHA; 23 | DAY; 21 | CHI; 24 | IND; 30 | POC; 11 | GLN; 14 | MCH; 32 | BRI; 25 | ATL; 30 | RCH; 28 | NHA; 10 | DOV; 36 | KAN; 36 | CAL; 15 | CLT; 40 | MAR; 25 | TAL; 15 | TEX; 18 | PHO; 32 | HOM; 24 | 29th | 3214 |

== Xfinity Series ==
=== Car No. 02 History ===
In 2001, Ryan Newman drove fifteen races in the 02 Alltel Ford in preparation for moving up to the NASCAR Cup Series the next year. "Rocket Man" Newman had six poles and only two starts outside the top-five. Newman had eight top-tens including a win at Michigan International Speedway, and would finish 28th in points despite running less than half the season.

In 2006, Newman returned to the 02 car at Watkins Glen, finishing 41st after an engine failure.

==== Car No. 02 results ====
| Year | Driver | No. | Make | 1 | 2 | 3 | 4 | 5 | 6 | 7 | 8 | 9 | 10 | 11 | 12 | 13 | 14 | 15 | 16 | 17 | 18 | 19 | 20 | 21 | 22 | 23 | 24 | 25 | 26 | 27 | 28 | 29 | 30 | 31 | 32 | 33 | 34 | 35 | Owners | Pts |
|---|---|---|---|---|---|---|---|---|---|---|---|---|---|---|---|---|---|---|---|---|---|---|---|---|---|---|---|---|---|---|---|---|---|---|---|---|---|---|---|---|
| 2001 | Ryan Newman | 02 | Ford | DAY | CAR; 9 | LVS | ATL; 32 | DAR; 17 | BRI; 6 | TEX; 14 | NSH | TAL | CAL | RCH; 14 | NHA; 15 | NZH | CLT | DOV | KEN | MLW | GLN | CHI; 26^{*} | GTY | PPR | IRP | MCH; 1^{*} | BRI; 8 | DAR; 4 | RCH; 7 | DOV; 21^{*} | KAN | CLT | MEM | PHO | CAR; 7 | HOM; 8 | | | | |
| 2006 | Ryan Newman | 02 | Dodge | DAY | CAL | MXC | LVS | ATL | BRI | TEX | NSH | PHO | TAL | RCH | DAR | CLT | DOV | NSH | KEN | MLW | DAY | CHI | NHA | MAR | GTY | IRP | GLN; 41 | MCH | BRI | CAL | RCH | DOV | KAN | CLT | MEM | TEX | PHO | HOM | | |

=== Car No. 2 History ===
Penske's first entry in the now Xfinity Series was in 1997, with Cup driver Rusty Wallace driving the No. 2 Ford at Auto Club Speedway. Wallace started 37th and finished 21st in his Miller Lite Ford.

==== Car No. 2 results ====
| Year | Driver | No. | Make | 1 | 2 | 3 | 4 | 5 | 6 | 7 | 8 | 9 | 10 | 11 | 12 | 13 | 14 | 15 | 16 | 17 | 18 | 19 | 20 | 21 | 22 | 23 | 24 | 25 | 26 | 27 | 28 | 29 | 30 | Owners | Pts |
|---|---|---|---|---|---|---|---|---|---|---|---|---|---|---|---|---|---|---|---|---|---|---|---|---|---|---|---|---|---|---|---|---|---|---|---|
| 1997 | Rusty Wallace | 2 | Ford | DAY | CAR | RCH | ATL | LVS | DAR | HCY | TEX | BRI | NSV | TAL | NHA | NZH | CLT | DOV | SBO | GLN | MLW | MYB | GTY | IRP | MCH | BRI | DAR | RCH | DOV | CLT | CAL; 21 | CAR | HOM | | |

=== Car No. 12 history ===
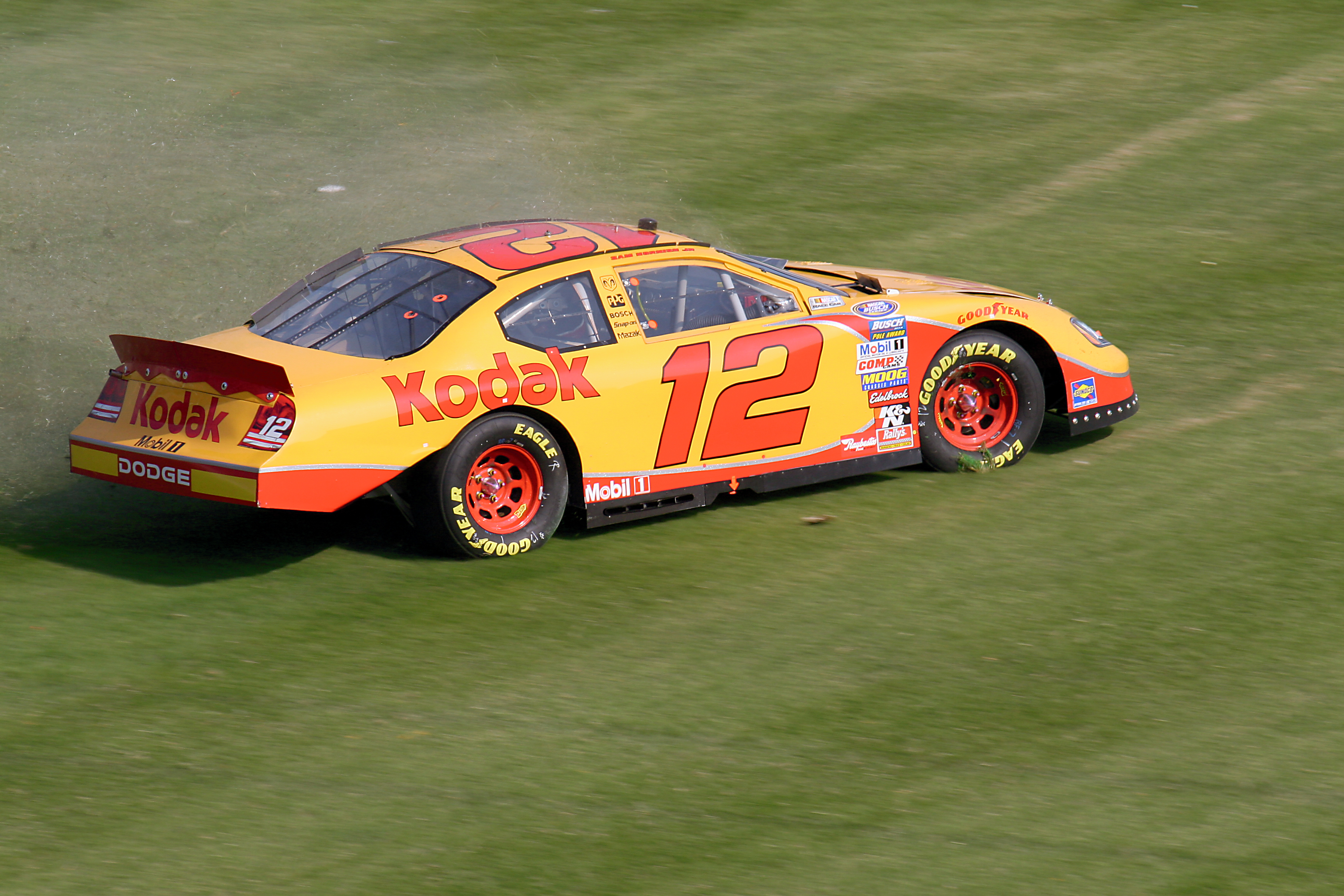
The No. 12 Busch Series car driven by Sam Hornish Jr. spinning out in 2007.

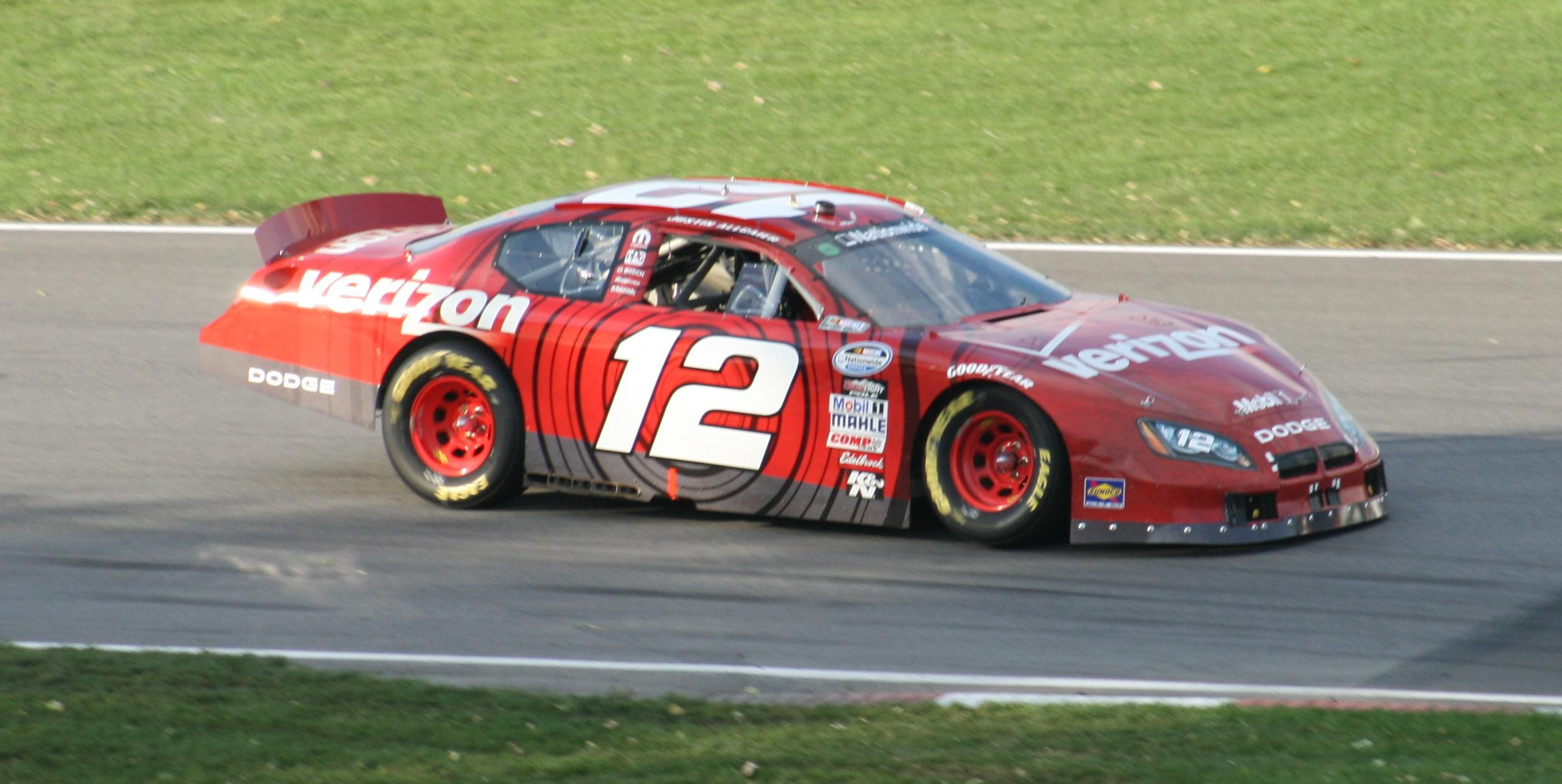
Justin Allgaier's Verizon Dodge in 2010.

Part Time (2007–2008)

The 12 car debuted in 2007, running 20 total races. Kurt Busch ran three races with Penske Truck Rental, with a best finish of fourth at Las Vegas. Sam Hornish Jr. ran nine races but had no top-tens and four crashes. Ryan Newman ran eight races with Kodak and Alltel, with a best finish of third at Richmond.

The team returned return on a limited basis in 2008, with Hornish driving most of the races early in the season. Hornish attempted 10 races (failing to qualify for two) with fewer DNFs and a best finish of eleventh at Darlington. ARCA Champion Justin Allgaier ran four races later in the year, with an eleventh place finish at Phoenix.

Justin Allgaier (2009–2010)

In 2009, Justin Allgaier moved into the car full-time. After Verizon, taking on the sponsorship responsibilities of Alltel, was barred from sponsoring the No. 12 Cup car under terms of the Viceroy Rule – preventing competition with title sponsor Sprint NEXTEL – the company moved their sponsorship to the Nationwide Series. Allgaier was involved in a close rookie battle with Michael McDowell and Scott Lagasse Jr., but eventually won the 2009 Rookie of the Year, scoring twelve top-tens en route to a sixth place points finish. Allgaier and Verizon returned for 2010. Justin took his first career victory in the fourth race of the season at Bristol Motor Speedway. The team had an impressive twenty top-tens and finished fourth in points.

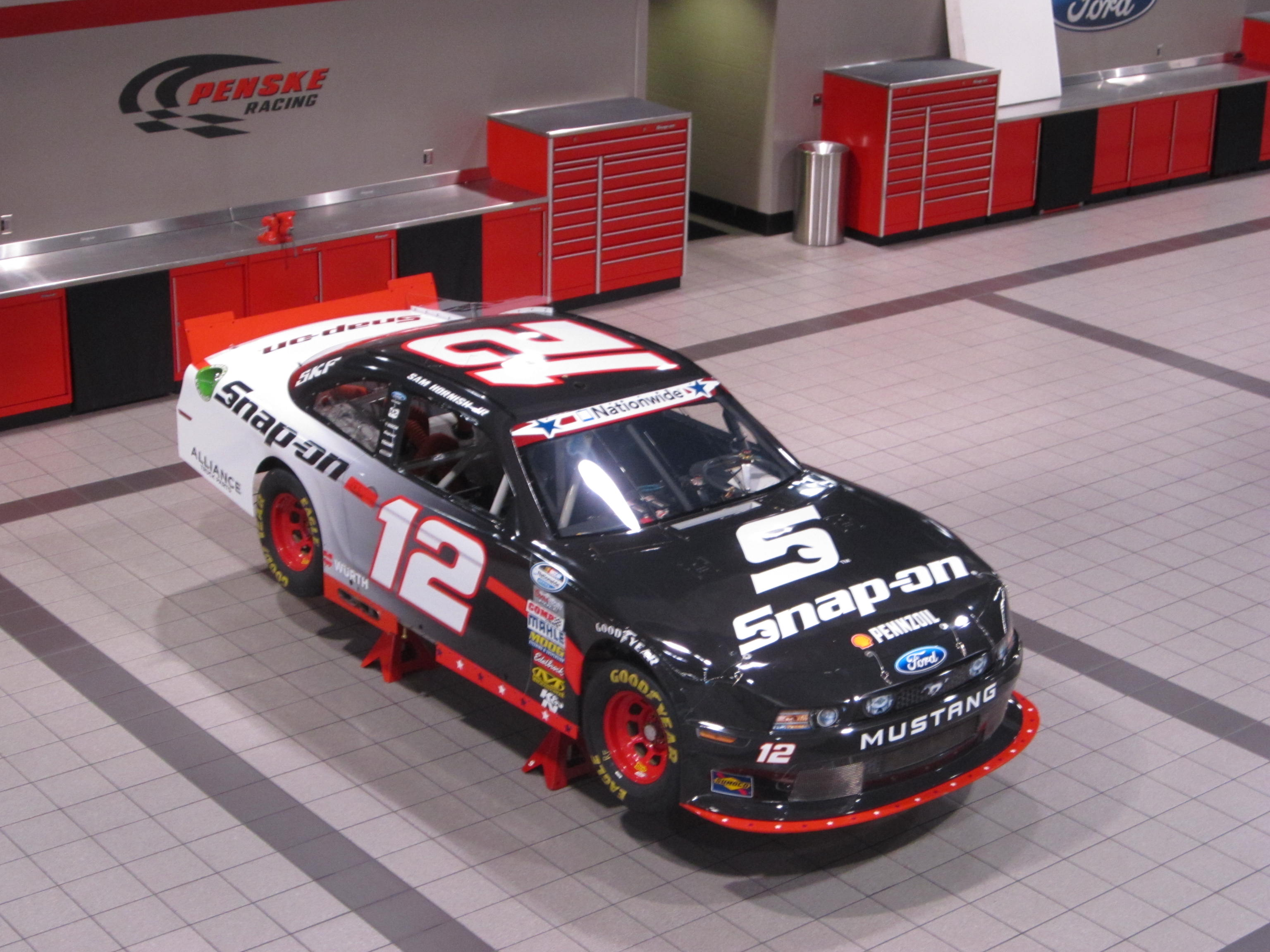
The No. 12 in the race shop in 2013

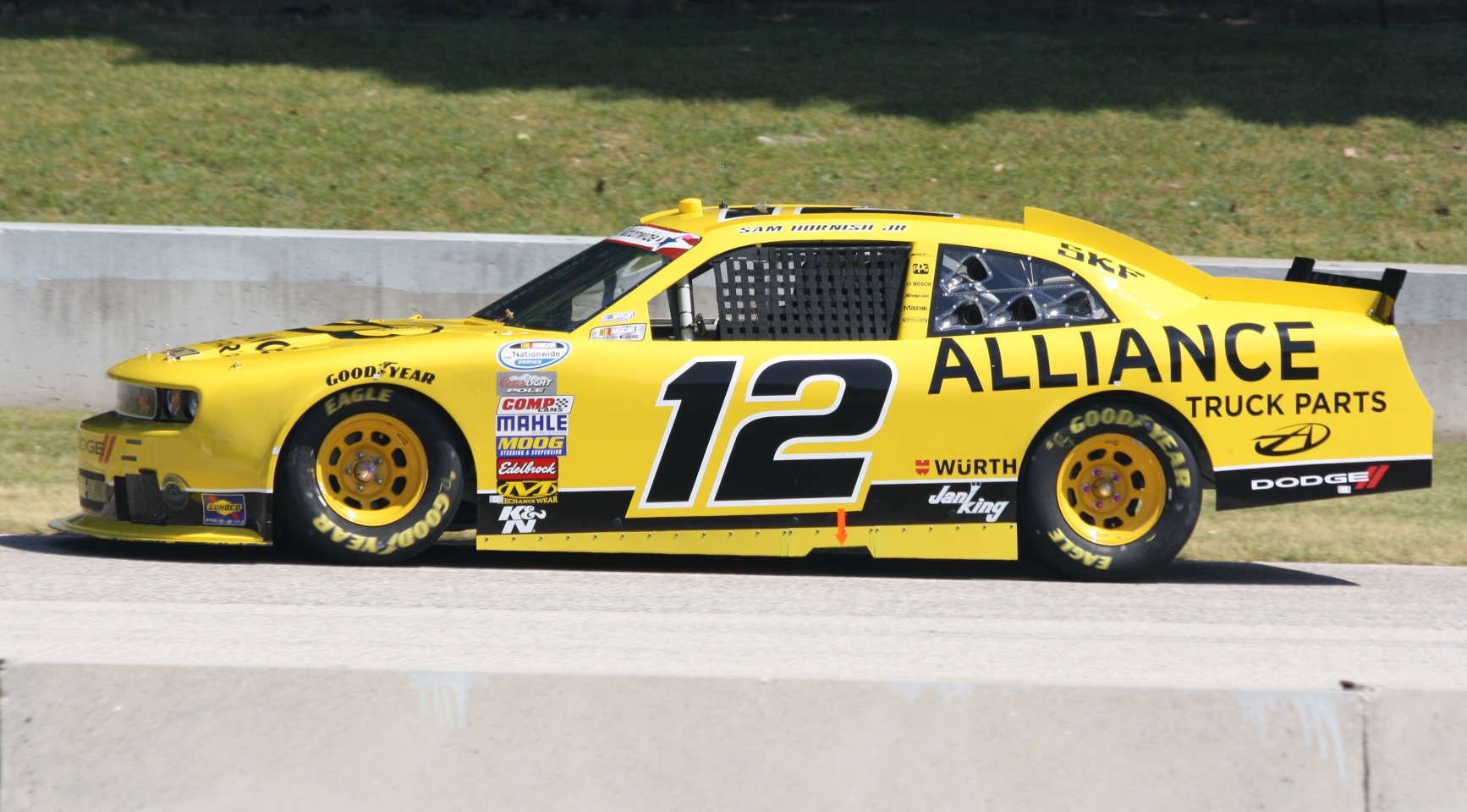
Sam Hornish Jr. in the 12 car in 2012.

Part Time (2011)

Due to Verizon's departure from NASCAR for Penske's IndyCar team, the No. 12 team scaled back to a limited schedule in 2011, prompting Allgaier to move to Turner Motorsports. Sam Hornish Jr., recently losing his Cup ride with Penske, took over the car on a limited basis with Alliance Truck Parts sponsoring his effort. Hornish won his first Nationwide Series race at Phoenix, a track where he had had success in IndyCar. Alex Tagliani drove the No. 12 in Montreal with sponsorship from Hot Wheels.

Sam Hornish Jr. (2012–2013)

Hornish returned for the full season in 2012, with expanded sponsorship from Alliance Truck Parts. Hornish had arguably his strongest season in stock cars to date after struggles in past Sprint Cup and Nationwide endeavors, scoring ten top-fives and 22 top-tens en route to a fourth place points finish.

Hornish returned to the car in 2013, and scored his second NASCAR victory at Las Vegas. He was a strong contender for the drivers' title, earning four poles, sixteen top-fives, and 25 top-tens, but ultimately finished second to Austin Dillon in the final points standings, despite Dillon not winning a race. Hornish was left without a full-time ride, as longtime owner Roger Penske did not have any opportunities for his former champion, though he did say Hornish deserved another opportunity at NASCAR's top level. Sponsors Alliance Truck Parts, Würth, and Detroit Genuine Parts would move up to sponsor Brad Keselowski's Sprint Cup car in 2014.

Part Time (2014–2020)

In 2014, after Hornish left for Joe Gibbs Racing, Team Penske narrowed down their Nationwide Series fleet to one full-time ride – the No. 22 team –leaving the No. 12 as a part-time ride. Ryan Blaney ran four races in the car, with Joey Logano running a single race at Watkins Glen, with sponsorship from Snap-on Tools and Western Star Trucks. Logano would win the pole with a new track record, and go on to win the race.

In 2016, Ryan Blaney drove the No. 12 in May at Charlotte and again in July at Kentucky. Joey Logano then drove the No. 12 at Watkins Glen in August and again at Charlotte in October, winning both races. Snap-On Tools was the primary sponsor for all the races except the October Charlotte race, where PPG Industries was the primary sponsor.

On August 12, 2016, Team Penske announced that the No. 12 would return to full-time competition for the 2017 season. However, after sponsorship failed to materialize, the car competed in only five races, with Logano winning at Las Vegas and Blaney winning the summer Charlotte race.

In 2018, Austin Cindric raced at 8 Xfinity Series races with the No. 12, claiming top-five finishes at all but one, and Keselowski drove the car once.

Penske let Keselowski, Logano, Paul Menard and Ryan Blaney drive the No. 12 two times each in 2019, collecting four top-five finishes.

In the 2020 Xfinity Series season, Keselowski drove the car at Phoenix.

==== Car No. 12 results ====
| Year | Driver | No. | Make | 1 | 2 | 3 | 4 | 5 | 6 | 7 | 8 | 9 | 10 | 11 | 12 | 13 | 14 | 15 | 16 | 17 | 18 | 19 | 20 | 21 | 22 | 23 | 24 | 25 | 26 | 27 | 28 | 29 | 30 | 31 | 32 | 33 | 34 | 35 | Owners | Pts |
|---|---|---|---|---|---|---|---|---|---|---|---|---|---|---|---|---|---|---|---|---|---|---|---|---|---|---|---|---|---|---|---|---|---|---|---|---|---|---|---|---|
| 2007 | Sam Hornish Jr. | 12 | Dodge | DAY; 31 | CAL; 35 | MXC | | ATL; 15 | | NSH; 25 | | | | RCH; 43 | | | | | | | | | | | | | | MCH; 25 | | | | | | | | TEX; 31 | PHO; 39 | HOM; 38 | | |
| 2007 | Kurt Busch | 12 | Dodge | | | | LVS; 4 | | | | TEX; 8 | | | | | CLT; 41 | DOV | NSH | KEN | MLW | NHA | DAY | | | | | | | | | | | | | | | | | | |
| 2007 | Ryan Newman | 12 | Dodge | | | | | | BRI; 4 | | | PHO; 36 | TAL | | DAR; 11 | | | | | | | | CHI; 43 | GTY | IRP | CGV | GLN; 9 | | BRI; 28 | CAL; 31 | RCH; 3 | DOV | KAN | CLT | MEM | | | | | |
| 2008 | Sam Hornish Jr. | 12 | Dodge | DAY | CAL | LVS; DNQ | ATL | BRI; DNQ | NSH | TEX; 19 | PHO | MXC; 13 | TAL | RCH; 15 | DAR; 11 | CLT; 39 | DOV; 23 | NSH | KEN | MLW | NHA | DAY | CHI | GTY | IRP | CGV | GLN; 36 | MCH | BRI; 14 | CAL | RCH | DOV | KAN | | | | | | | |
| 2008 | Justin Allgaier | 12 | Dodge | | | | | | | | | | | | | | | | | | | | | | | | | | | | | | | CLT; 34 | MEM | TEX; 21 | PHO; 11 | HOM; 28 | | |
| 2009 | Justin Allgaier | 12 | Dodge | DAY; 40 | CAL; 14 | LVS; 8 | BRI; 5 | TEX; 10 | NSH; 29 | PHO; 8 | TAL; 32 | RCH; 38 | DAR; 5 | CLT; 14 | DOV; 10 | NSH; 13 | KEN; 5 | MLW; 17 | NHA; 13 | DAY; 8 | CHI; 10 | GTY; 11 | IRP; 21 | IOW; 15 | GLN; 17 | MCH; 7 | BRI; 27 | CGV; 36 | ATL; 17 | RCH; 8 | DOV; 25 | KAN; 6 | CAL; 16 | CLT; 12 | MEM; 19 | TEX; 25 | PHO; 16 | HOM; 20 | | |
| 2010 | Justin Allgaier | 12 | Dodge | DAY; 4 | CAL; 9 | LVS; 7 | BRI; 1 | NSH; 4 | PHO; 13 | TEX; 11 | TAL; 15 | RCH; 15 | DAR; 17 | DOV; 16 | CLT; 4 | NSH; 4 | KEN; 8 | ROA; 35 | NHA; 6 | DAY; 17 | CHI; 10 | GTY; 25 | IRP; 7 | IOW; 8 | GLN; 34 | MCH; 4 | BRI; 33 | CGV; 9 | ATL; 13 | RCH; 12 | DOV; 9 | KAN; 7 | CAL; 8 | CLT; 3 | GTY; 3^{*} | TEX; 13 | PHO; 8 | HOM; 11 | 8th | 3512 |
| 2011 | Sam Hornish Jr. | 12 | Dodge | DAY; 36 | PHO | LVS | BRI | CAL | TEX; 16 | TAL; 13 | NSH | RCH; 7 | DAR | DOV | IOW | CLT; 12 | CHI | MCH; 24 | ROA | DAY | KEN | NHA | NSH; 6 | IRP | IOW | GLN | | | | | CHI; 5 | DOV | KAN | CLT; 12 | TEX; 7 | PHO; 1 | HOM; 7 | | 33rd | 433 |
| 2011 | Alex Tagliani | 12 | Dodge | | | | | | | | | | | | | | | | | | | | | | | | CGV; 2 | BRI | ATL | RCH | | | | | | | | | 33rd | 433 |
| 2012 | Sam Hornish Jr. | 12 | Dodge | DAY; 20 | PHO; 6 | LVS; 9 | BRI; 13 | CAL; 13 | TEX; 11 | RCH; 5 | TAL; 12 | DAR; 4 | IOW; 12 | CLT; 9 | DOV; 13 | MCH; 6 | ROA; 5 | KEN; 6 | DAY; 10 | NHA; 4 | CHI; 8 | IND; 2 | IOW; 3 | GLN; 3 | CGV; 2 | BRI; 10 | ATL; 9 | RCH; 30 | CHI; 6 | KEN; 2 | DOV; 18 | CLT; 35 | KAN; 9 | TEX; 7 | PHO; 14 | HOM; 4 | | | 7th | 1146 |
| 2013 | Sam Hornish Jr. | 12 | Ford | DAY; 2 | PHO; 7 | LVS; 1* | BRI; 4 | CAL; 2 | TEX; 34 | RCH; 7 | TAL; 25 | DAR; 8 | CLT; 12 | DOV; 7 | IOW; 4 | MCH; 32 | ROA; 5 | KEN; 9 | DAY; 7* | NHA; 7 | CHI; 2 | IND; 34 | IOW; 2 | GLN; 2 | MOH; 3 | BRI; 12 | ATL; 3 | RCH; 6 | CHI; 3 | KEN; 4 | DOV; 17 | KAN; 17 | CLT; 3* | TEX; 3 | PHO; 5 | HOM; 8 | | | 4th | 1177 |
| 2014 | Ryan Blaney | 12 | Ford | DAY | PHO | LVS | BRI | CAL | TEX | DAR | RCH | TAL | IOW | CLT | DOV | MCH | ROA | KEN; 5 | DAY | NHA | CHI | IND | IOW | | | | | | | | | | CLT; 4 | TEX; 3 | PHO | HOM; 4 | | | | |
| 2014 | Joey Logano | 12 | Ford | | | | | | | | | | | | | | | | | | | | | GLN; 3 | MOH | BRI | ATL | RCH | CHI | KEN | DOV | KAN | | | | | | | | |
| 2015 | Joey Logano | 12 | Ford | DAY | ATL | LVS | PHO | CAL | TEX | BRI | RCH | TAL | IOW | CLT | DOV | MCH | CHI | DAY | KEN | NHA | IND | IOW | GLN; 1 | MOH | BRI | ROA | DAR | RCH | CHI | KEN | DOV | CLT | KAN | TEX | PHO | HOM | | | | |
| 2016 | Ryan Blaney | 12 | Ford | DAY | ATL | LVS | PHO | CAL | TEX | BRI | RCH | TAL | DOV | CLT; 16 | POC | MCH | IOW | DAY | KEN; 8 | NHA | IND | IOW | | | | | | | | | | | | | | | | | | |
| 2016 | Joey Logano | 12 | Ford | | | | | | | | | | | | | | | | | | | | GLN; 1* | MOH | BRI | ROA | DAR | RCH | CHI | KEN | DOV | CLT; 1 | KAN | TEX | PHO | HOM | | | | |
| 2017 | Joey Logano | 12 | Ford | DAY | ATL | LVS; 1* | PHO | CAL | TEX; 34 | BRI | RCH | TAL | | | | | | | | | | | GLN; 2 | MOH | BRI | ROA | DAR | RCH | CHI | KEN | DOV | | | | | | | | | |
| 2017 | Ryan Blaney | 12 | Ford | | | | | | | | | | CLT; 1* | DOV | POC | MCH | IOW | DAY | KEN; 2 | NHA | IND | IOW | | | | | | | | | | | | | | | | | | |
| 2017 | Sam Hornish Jr. | 12 | Ford | | | | | | | | | | | | | | | | | | | | | | | | | | | | | CLT; 2 | KAN | TEX | PHO | HOM | | | | |
| 2018 | Austin Cindric | 12 | Ford | DAY | ATL; 7 | LVS | PHO | CAL | TEX; 9 | BRI | RCH | TAL | DOV | CLT; 16 | POC; 4 | MCH | IOW | CHI; 14 | DAY | KEN; 10 | NHA | IOW | | | BRI; 14 | ROA | DAR | IND; 34 | LVS | RCH | ROV | DOV | KAN | TEX | PHO | HOM | | | | |
| 2018 | Brad Keselowski | 12 | Ford | | | | | | | | | | | | | | | | | | | | GLN; 10 | MOH | | | | | | | | | | | | | | | | |
| 2019 | Brad Keselowski | 12 | Ford | DAY; 37 | ATL | LVS | PHO | CAL | TEX; 36 | BRI | RCH | TAL | DOV | CLT | POC | | | | | | | | | | | | | | | | | | | | | | | | | |
| 2019 | Paul Menard | 12 | Ford | | | | | | | | | | | | | MCH; 4* | IOW | | | | NHA; 5 | IOW | | | | | | | | | | | | | | | | | | |
| 2019 | Joey Logano | 12 | Ford | | | | | | | | | | | | | | | CHI; 2 | DAY | KEN | | | | | BRI; 36 | ROA | | | | | | | | | | | | | | |
| 2019 | Ryan Blaney | 12 | Ford | | | | | | | | | | | | | | | | | | | | GLN; 4 | MOH | | | DAR; 3 | IND | LVS | RCH | ROV | DOV | KAN | TEX | PHO | HOM | | | | |
| 2020 | Brad Keselowski | 12 | Ford | DAY | LVS | CAL | PHO; 4 | DAR | CLT | BRI | ATL | HOM | HOM | TAL | POC | IRC | KEN | KEN | TEX | KAN | ROA | DRC | DOV | DOV | DAY | DAR | RCH | RCH | BRI | LVS | TAL | ROV | KAN | TEX | MAR | PHO | | | | |

=== Car No. 22 history ===
Part-time (2009)

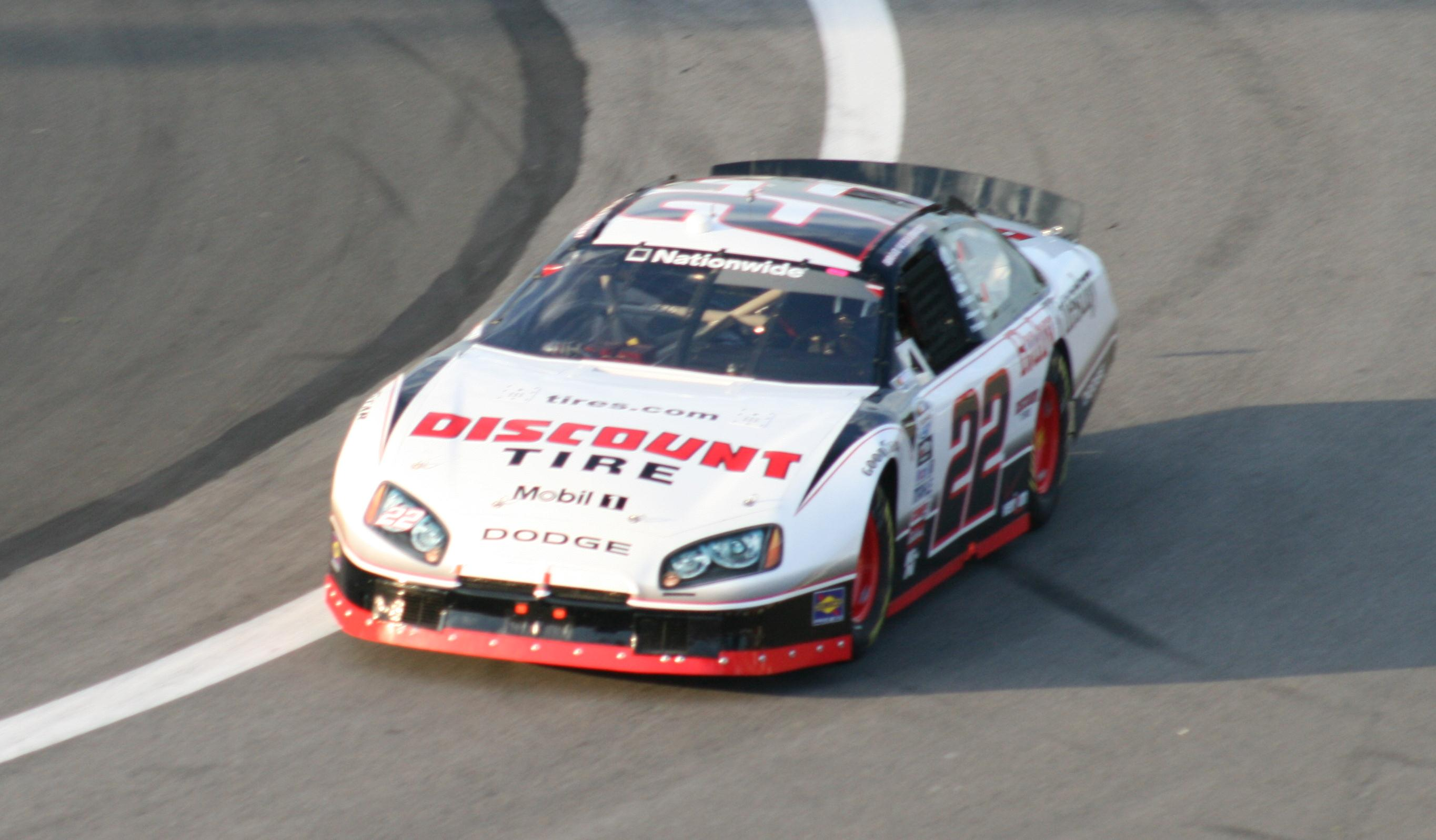
Brad Keselowski won his first Nationwide Championship in 2010.

In 2009, Penske developmental driver Parker Kligerman made his debut at Kansas Speedway, winning the pole, leading seven laps, and finishing a respectable sixteenth. Kligerman also attempted the season finale at Homestead, but failed to qualify, running the No. 42 car instead.

Brad Keselowski (2010–2011)

For 2010, Penske Racing ran two full-time Nationwide series cars with Discount Tire and Ruby Tuesday coming on board to sponsor Brad Keselowski in the No. 22. They continued to use Dodge engines, despite Dodge cutting their Nationwide support. On November 6, 2010, Brad Keselowski and the No. 22 Discount Tire/Ruby Tuesday Nationwide team secured the NASCAR Nationwide driver championship by finishing 3rd at Texas Motor Speedway. By holding an insurmountable 465-point lead over Carl Edwards with two races left in the season, the No. 22 team delivered Roger Penske's first NASCAR title of any kind.

Multiple Drivers (2011–2018)

For the 2011 season, Penske continued to run the No. 22 full-time with Brad Keselowski. In August, Keselowski suffered a hard crash while testing at Road Atlanta. He was replaced in the No. 22 by Hornish Jr., Kurt Busch, and Parker Kligerman. Formula 1 Champion Jacques Villeneuve drove the No. 22 at the road courses. The No. 22 team scored five wins with Keselowski and another with Busch at Watkins Glen.

In 2012, Keselowski was scheduled to split the 22 ride, with Parker Kligerman running between five and seven races. However, after only running three races with the team, Kligerman was replaced in both the Nationwide Series and his Truck Series ride at BKR with fellow up-and-coming driver Ryan Blaney, who ran the standalone oval races. Villeneuve was named to drive at Road America and Montreal for the team.

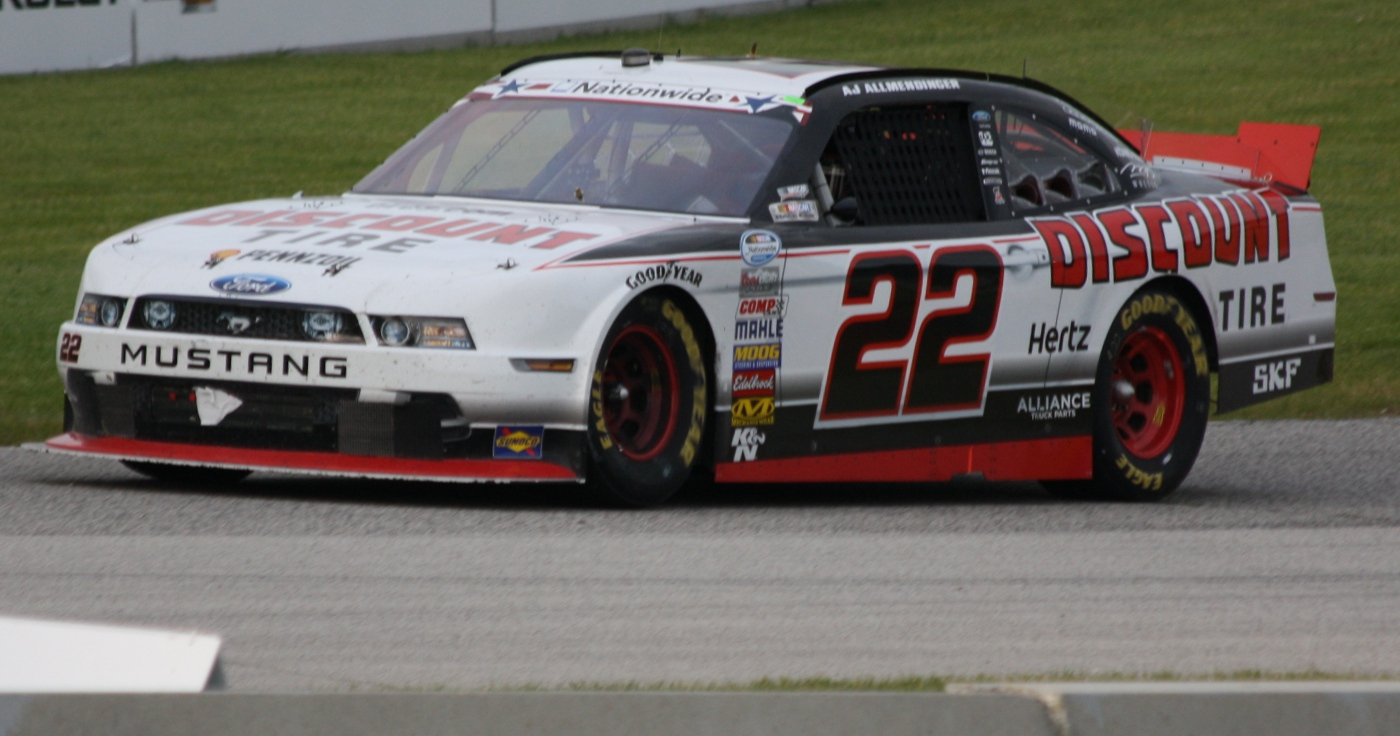
The No. 22 won the 2013 owner's championship. Pictured is A. J. Allmendinger's winning car at Road America.

In 2013, Brad Keselowski and Ryan Blaney were scheduled to share the No. 22, joined by new Penske driver Joey Logano. In June, former Penske Cup driver A. J. Allmendinger signed on to run two races in the 22, at the road courses Road America and Mid-Ohio. Allmendinger won the pole at Road America, then proceeded to win the race, his first career Nationwide win, after leading 29 laps. Allmendinger then won at Mid-Ohio after starting second and leading 73 of 94 laps. Ryan Blaney then won his first career race at Kentucky Speedway, after leading 96 of the final 100 laps of the race. The team won the Nationwide Owners' Championship on the strength of twelve total race victories among the four drivers. This was the first Nationwide Owners title for Team Penske.

In 2014, the No. 22 car was shared by Joey Logano, Brad Keselowski, Ryan Blaney, and Alex Tagliani in hopes of defending the Nationwide Owners' Championship. Michael McDowell ran the car at Kentucky in September, the fifth driver to run the car in 2014. The No. 22 team beat the No. 54 JGR team once again for the owner's title. They again beat the No. 54 team for the owner's title in 2015, before going winless in 2016. In 2017 Brad Keselowski brought the 22 back to victory lane at Pocono after a last-lap pass on Kyle Larson. Keselowski won another race at the fall Richmond race and Ryan Blaney won the fall Dover race. The 22 won the owners championship again at Homestead with Sam Hornish Jr. driving the car to a second-place finish.

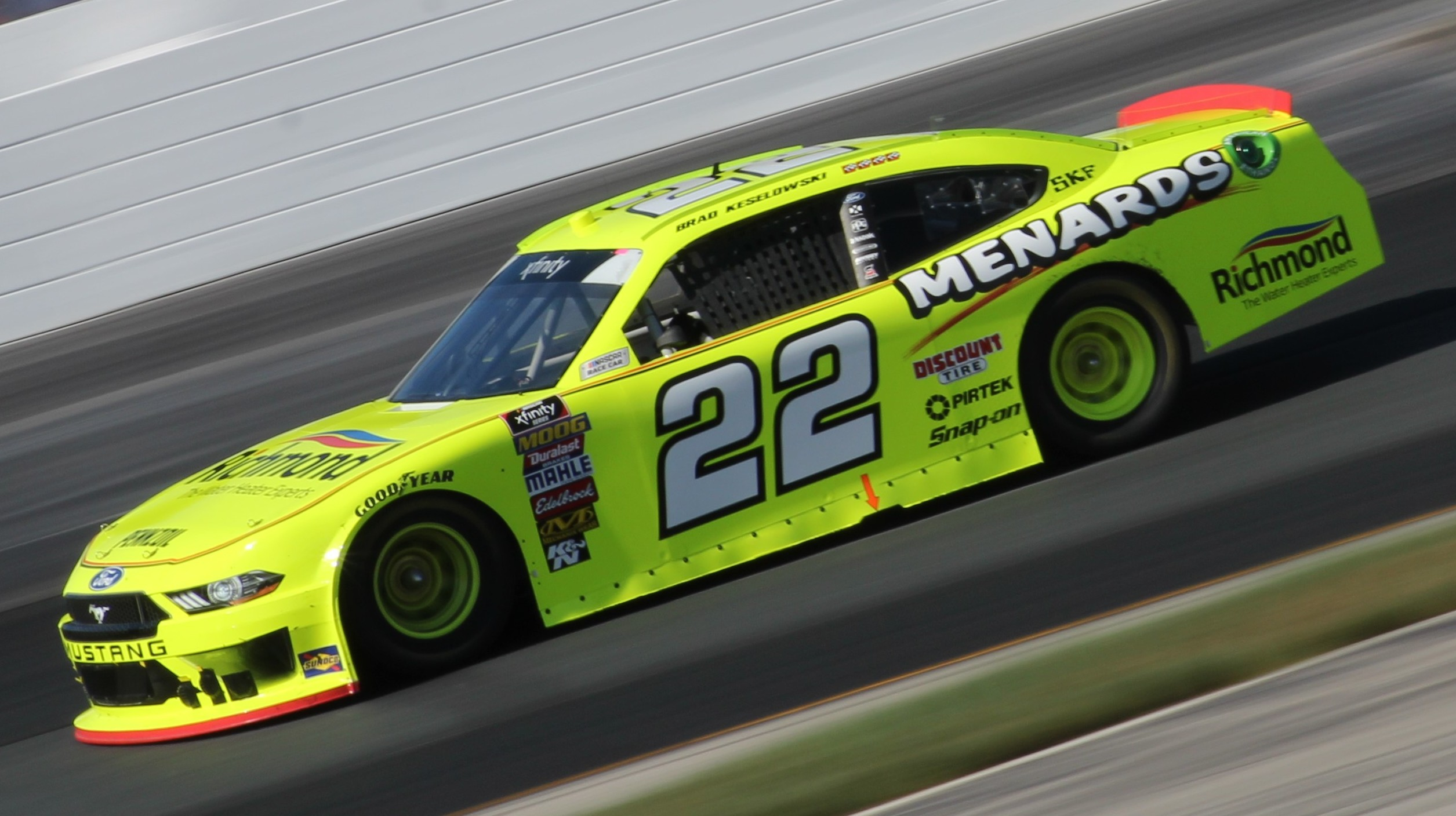
Brad Keselowski's 2018 Xfinity Mustang at New Hampshire Motor Speedway.

Austin Cindric (2019–2021)

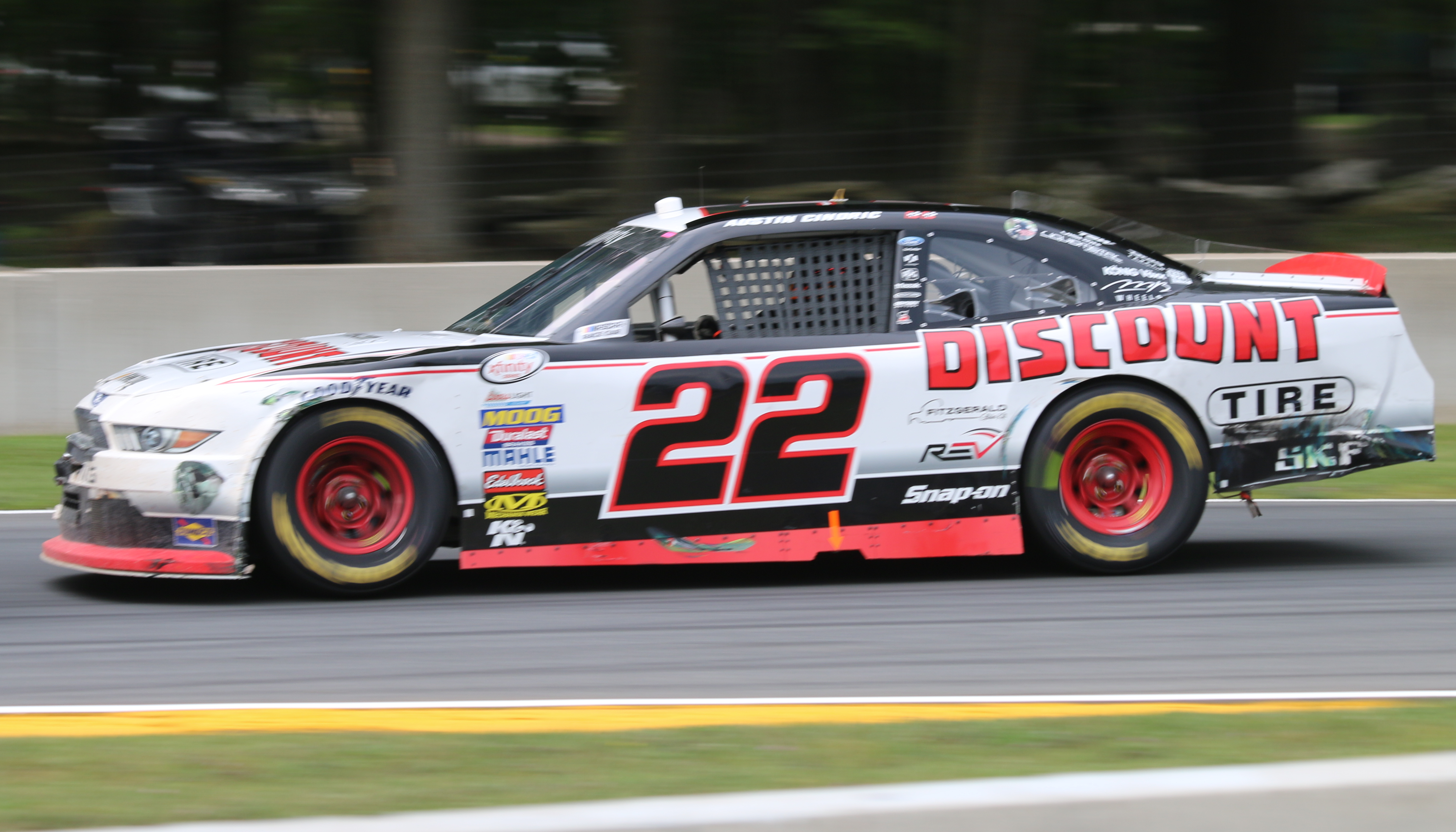
Cindric's No. 22 Xfinity Series car at Road America

For the 2019 season, Austin Cindric was announced as the full-time driver of the No. 22 with sponsorship from MoneyLion. On July 11, 2019, crew chief Brian Wilson was suspended for one race after the car scheduled to race at Kentucky was discovered to have an illegal body modification. The L1-level penalty also resulted in a deduction of ten points for the team and Cindric, and a $10,000 fine. Cindric scored two wins and fourteen top-fives, but had a poor race at Kansas and could not advance to the Championship 4.

In 2020, Cindric became the ninth different driver to win three consecutive races in series history by winning back-to-back races at Kentucky as well as Texas where he had initially finished in second place until race-winner Kyle Busch was disqualified for failing post-race inspection. Cindric went on to make the Championship 4 and win his first Xfinity Championship while at the same time winning the race at Phoenix Raceway in Overtime. Cindric would go on to win five races in 2021 and finished runner-up to Daniel Hemric in the season finale and final standings before taking over the famous No. 2 in the 2022 NASCAR Cup Series, replacing Brad Keselowski as he went to RFK Racing.

Hiatus

On January 13, 2022, Team Penske shut down its Xfinity program to focus on its Cup Series efforts and also the NASCAR Xfinity Series program was diverted to IMSA WeatherTech SportsCar Championship and FIA World Endurance Championship.

==== Car No. 22 results ====
| Year | Driver | No. | Make | 1 | 2 | 3 | 4 | 5 | 6 | 7 | 8 | 9 | 10 | 11 | 12 | 13 | 14 | 15 | 16 | 17 | 18 | 19 | 20 | 21 | 22 | 23 | 24 | 25 | 26 | 27 | 28 | 29 | 30 | 31 | 32 | 33 | 34 | 35 | Owners | Pts |
|---|---|---|---|---|---|---|---|---|---|---|---|---|---|---|---|---|---|---|---|---|---|---|---|---|---|---|---|---|---|---|---|---|---|---|---|---|---|---|---|---|
| 2009 | Parker Kligerman | 22 | Dodge | DAY | CAL | LVS | BRI | TEX | NSH | PHO | TAL | RCH | DAR | CLT | DOV | NSH | KEN | MLW | NHA | DAY | CHI | GTY | IRP | IOW | GLN | MCH | BRI | CGV | ATL | RCH | DOV | KAN; 16 | CAL | CLT | MEM | TEX | PHO | HOM; DNQ | | |
| 2010 | Brad Keselowski | 22 | Dodge | DAY; 13 | CAL; 3 | LVS; 4 | BRI; 2* | NSH; 5 | PHO; 3 | TEX; 4 | TAL; 1 | RCH; 1* | DAR; 7 | DOV; 7 | CLT; 2* | NSH; 1* | KEN; 3 | ROA; 4 | NHA; 2 | DAY; 4 | CHI; 21 | GTY; 14* | IRP; 8 | IOW; 4 | GLN; 4 | MCH; 1* | BRI; 14 | CGV; 4 | ATL; 12 | RCH; 2 | DOV; 17 | KAN; 2 | CAL; 2 | CLT; 1 | GTY; 1 | TEX; 3 | PHO; 4 | HOM; 3 | 1st | 5639 |
| 2011 | Brad Keselowski | 22 | Dodge | DAY; 30 | PHO; 34 | LVS; 3 | BRI; 9 | CAL; 10 | TEX; 2 | TAL; 4 | NSH; 3 | RCH; 5 | DAR; 27 | DOV; 12 | IOW; 3 | CLT; 6 | CHI; 30 | MCH; 9 | | DAY; 17 | KEN; 1* | NHA; 8 | NSH; 12 | IRP; 1 | | | | | ATL; 7 | RCH; 19 | CHI; 1* | DOV; 2 | KAN; 1* | CLT; 6* | TEX; 5 | PHO; 5 | HOM; 1 | | 5th | 1209 |
| 2011 | Jacques Villeneuve | 22 | Dodge | | | | | | | | | | | | | | | | ROA; 3 | | | | | | | | CGV; 27* | | | | | | | | | | | | 5th | 1209 |
| 2011 | Sam Hornish Jr. | 22 | Dodge | | | | | | | | | | | | | | | | | | | | | | IOW; 24 | | | | | | | | | | | | | | 5th | 1209 |
| 2011 | Kurt Busch | 22 | Dodge | | | | | | | | | | | | | | | | | | | | | | | GLN; 1 | | | | | | | | | | | | | 5th | 1209 |
| 2011 | Parker Kligerman | 22 | Dodge | | | | | | | | | | | | | | | | | | | | | | | | | BRI; 9 | | | | | | | | | | | 5th | 1209 |
| 2012 | Brad Keselowski | 22 | Dodge | DAY; 2 | PHO; 2 | LVS; 23 | BRI; 3 | CAL; 3 | TEX; 35 | RCH; 16 | TAL; 20 | DAR; 3 | | CLT; 1 | | MCH; 10 | | KEN; 7 | DAY; 35 | NHA; 1* | | IND; 1 | | GLN; 2* | | BRI; 32 | ATL; 2 | | CHI; 4 | | | CLT; 18 | | | | | | | 6th | 1149 |
| 2012 | Parker Kligerman | 22 | Dodge | | | | | | | | | | IOW; 8 | | DOV; 12 | | | | | | CHI; 7 | | | | | | | | | | | | | | | | | | 6th | 1149 |
| 2012 | Jacques Villeneuve | 22 | Dodge | | | | | | | | | | | | | | ROA; 9 | | | | | | | | CGV; 3* | | | | | | | | | | | | | | 6th | 1149 |
| 2012 | Ryan Blaney | 22 | Dodge | | | | | | | | | | | | | | | | | | | | IOW; 10 | | | | | RCH; 9 | | KEN; 9 | DOV; 13 | | KAN; 11 | TEX; 2 | PHO | HOM; 8 | | | 6th | 1149 |
| 2013 | Brad Keselowski | 22 | Ford | DAY; 12 | PHO; 2 | LVS; 37 | BRI; 15 | CAL; 19 | TEX; 2 | RCH; 1 | | | | | | | | KEN; 1 | | | | | IOW; 1 | GLN; 1 | | BRI; 2 | | RCH; 1 | | | | KAN; 28 | | TEX; 1^{*} | PHO; 19 | | | | 1st | 1295 |
| 2013 | Joey Logano | 22 | Ford | | | | | | | | TAL; 2* | DAR; 4 | CLT; 3 | DOV; 1 | | MCH; 11 | | | DAY; 9 | NHA; 11 | CHI; 1 | IND; 3 | | | | | ATL; 6 | | CHI; 2 | | DOV; 1* | | CLT; 7 | | | HOM; 6 | | | 1st | 1295 |
| 2013 | Ryan Blaney | 22 | Ford | | | | | | | | | | | | IOW; 9 | | | | | | | | | | | | | | | KEN; 1* | | | | | | | | | 1st | 1295 |
| 2013 | A. J. Allmendinger | 22 | Ford | | | | | | | | | | | | | | ROA; 1* | | | | | | | | MOH; 1* | | | | | | | | | | | | | | 1st | 1295 |
| 2014 | Brad Keselowski | 22 | Ford | DAY; 2 | PHO; 3 | LVS; 1* | | | | | | | | CLT; 2 | | | | KEN; 2* | | NHA; 1* | | | IOW; 1* | GLN; 4 | | | | | | | | | CLT; 1 | | PHO; 1 | HOM; 8 | | | 1st | 1347 |
| 2014 | Ryan Blaney | 22 | Ford | | | | BRI; 4 | | TEX; 8 | | RCH; 9 | TAL; 21 | IOW; 2 | | | | | | | | CHI; 9 | | | | | BRI; 1 | | RCH; 4 | CHI; 4 | | | KAN; 3 | | | | | | | 1st | 1347 |
| 2014 | Joey Logano | 22 | Ford | | | | | CAL; 4* | | DAR; 5 | | | | | DOV; 3 | MCH; 16 | | | DAY; 6 | | | IND; 5 | | | | | ATL; 2 | | | | DOV; 2 | | | TEX; 2 | | | | | 1st | 1347 |
| 2014 | Alex Tagliani | 22 | Ford | | | | | | | | | | | | | | ROA; 2 | | | | | | | | MOH; 5 | | | | | | | | | | | | | | 1st | 1347 |
| 2014 | Michael McDowell | 22 | Ford | | | | | | | | | | | | | | | | | | | | | | | | | | | KEN; 8 | | | | | | | | | 1st | 1347 |
| 2015 | Brad Keselowski | 22 | Ford | DAY; 5 | | | | CAL; 8 | TEX; 2 | | | | | | | | | | KEN; 1 | NHA; 3 | | | GLN; 2* | | | | | | | | | CLT; 3 | | TEX; 1* | PHO; 2 | | | | 1st | 1308 |
| 2015 | Joey Logano | 22 | Ford | | ATL; 2 | | PHO; 1* | | | BRI; 1** | RCH; 2 | TAL; 1* | | | | MCH; 7* | | DAY; 14 | | | | | | | | | DAR; 6 | RCH; 4 | | | | | KAN; 3 | | | | | | 1st | 1308 |
| 2015 | Ryan Blaney | 22 | Ford | | | LVS; 2 | | | | | | | IOW; 5 | CLT; 10 | DOV; 34 | | CHI; 2 | | | | IND; 2 | IOW; 1* | | | BRI; 22 | ROA; 2 | | | CHI; 35 | KEN; 1* | DOV; 4 | | | | | HOM; 5 | | | 1st | 1308 |
| 2015 | Alex Tagliani | 22 | Ford | | | | | | | | | | | | | | | | | | | | | MOH; 2* | | | | | | | | | | | | | | | 1st | 1308 |
| 2016 | Joey Logano | 22 | Ford | DAY; 2* | | | | | | BRI; 9 | | TAL; 27 | DOV; 7 | CLT; 3 | POC; 5 | MCH; 6 | | DAY; 4* | | | IND; 8 | | | | | | | | CHI; 7 | | | | KAN; 4 | | | | | | 3rd | 4037 |
| 2016 | Brad Keselowski | 22 | Ford | | ATL; 6 | LVS; 15 | PHO; 9 | | TEX; 3 | | RCH; 9 | | | | | | IOW; 3 | | KEN; 10 | NHA; 3 | | IOW; 8 | GLN; 24 | | BRI; 12 | | | RCH; 3 | | | | CLT; 9 | | TEX; 2* | PHO; 9 | | | | 3rd | 4037 |
| 2016 | Ryan Blaney | 22 | Ford | | | | | CAL; 20 | | | | | | | | | | | | | | | | MOH; 3 | | | DAR; 7 | | | KEN; 3 | DOV; 4 | | | | | HOM; 4 | | | 3rd | 4037 |
| 2016 | Alex Tagliani | 22 | Ford | | | | | | | | | | | | | | | | | | | | | | | ROA; 7 | | | | | | | | | | | | | 3rd | 4037 |
| 2017 | Brad Keselowski | 22 | Ford | DAY; 4 | ATL; 2 | LVS; 10 | | | | | | | CLT; 6 | | POC; 1* | MCH; 4* | | | | NHA; 5* | | | GLN; 3 | | | | | RCH; 1 | | | | | | | | | | | 1st | 4035 |
| 2017 | Ryan Blaney | 22 | Ford | | | | PHO; 2 | | TEX; 2 | BRI; 2 | RCH; 5 | | | DOV; 2 | | | | | | | | | | | | | | | CHI; 26 | | DOV; 1* | CLT; 3 | KAN; 3 | TEX; 2 | PHO; 2* | | | | 1st | 4035 |
| 2017 | Joey Logano | 22 | Ford | | | | | CAL; 2* | | | | TAL; 3 | | | | | | DAY; 8 | KEN; 6 | | IND; 3 | | | | BRI; 9 | | DAR; 2 | | | | | | | | | | | | 1st | 4035 |
| 2017 | Sam Hornish Jr. | 22 | Ford | | | | | | | | | | | | | | IOW; 37 | | | | | IOW; 34 | | MOH; 1* | | | | | | KEN; 31 | | | | | | HOM; 2 | | | 1st | 4035 |
| 2017 | Austin Cindric | 22 | Ford | | | | | | | | | | | | | | | | | | | | | | | ROA; 16 | | | | | | | | | | | | | 1st | 4035 |
| 2018 | Joey Logano | 22 | Ford | DAY; 34 | ATL; 2 | | | CAL; 1* | | | | | | | | | | | | | | | GLN; 1* | | BRI; 5 | | | | | | | | | | | | | | 6th | 2274 |
| 2018 | Ryan Blaney | 22 | Ford | | | LVS; 4 | | | TEX; 1* | | | | | | | | | | DAY; 4 | | | | | | | | | IND; 3 | | | | | | | | | | | 6th | 2274 |
| 2018 | Brad Keselowski | 22 | Ford | | | | PHO; 1 | | | | | | | CLT; 1 | | | | | | | NHA; 2 | | | | | | DAR; 1 | | | | | | | | | | | | 6th | 2274 |
| 2018 | Austin Cindric | 22 | Ford | | | | | | | BRI; 12 | RCH; 5 | TAL; 30 | DOV; 9 | | | | IOW; 11 | | | | | IOW; 18 | | MOH; 2* | | ROA; 37 | | | LVS; 9 | RCH; 13 | ROV; 3 | DOV; 8 | KAN; 39 | TEX; 3 | PHO; 4 | HOM; 5 | | | 6th | 2274 |
| 2018 | Paul Menard | 22 | Ford | | | | | | | | | | | | POC; 8 | MCH; 5 | | CHI; 8 | | KEN; 9 | | | | | | | | | | | | | | | | | | | 6th | 2274 |
| 2019 | Austin Cindric | 22 | Ford | DAY; 5 | ATL; 10 | LVS; 22 | PHO; 5 | CAL; 6 | TEX; 11 | BRI; 6 | RCH; 2 | TAL; 5 | DOV; 6 | CLT; 9 | POC; 7 | MCH; 11 | IOW; 10 | CHI; 5 | DAY; 4 | KEN; 14 | NHA; 12 | IOW; 37 | GLN; 1 | MOH; 1* | BRI; 5 | ROA; 2 | DAR; 10 | IND; 27 | LVS; 12 | RCH; 2 | ROV; 3 | DOV; 3 | KAN; 25 | TEX; 3 | PHO; 6 | HOM; 7 | | | 6th | 2294 |
| 2020 | Austin Cindric | 22 | Ford | DAY; 25 | LVS; 2 | CAL; 3 | PHO; 8 | DAR; 4 | CLT; 3 | BRI; 36 | ATL; 16* | HOM; 2 | HOM; 10 | TAL; 4 | POC; 29 | IRC; 5 | KEN; 1 | KEN; 1* | TEX; 1 | KAN; 2 | ROA; 1* | DRC; 1 | DOV; 2 | DOV; 3 | DAY; 8 | DAR; 12 | RCH; 4 | RCH; 10 | BRI; 3 | LVS; 6 | TAL; 34 | ROV; 6 | KAN; 28 | TEX; 4 | MAR; 10 | PHO; 1 | | | 1st | 4040 |
| 2021 | Austin Cindric | 22 | Ford | DAY; 1* | DRC; 2* | HOM; 5* | LVS; 4 | PHO; 1* | ATL; 13 | MAR; 6 | TAL; 2* | DAR; 30 | DOV; 1 | COA; 5 | CLT; 2 | MOH; 14* | TEX; 3 | NSH; 32 | POC; 1* | ROA; 8 | ATL; 10 | NHA; 4 | GLN; 3 | IRC; 1* | MCH; 37 | DAY; 39 | DAR; 3 | RCH; 16 | BRI; 2 | LVS; 4 | TAL; 8 | ROV; 2* | TEX; 5 | KAN; 2* | MAR; 2 | PHO; 2* | | | 1st | 4035 |

=== Car No. 26 history ===
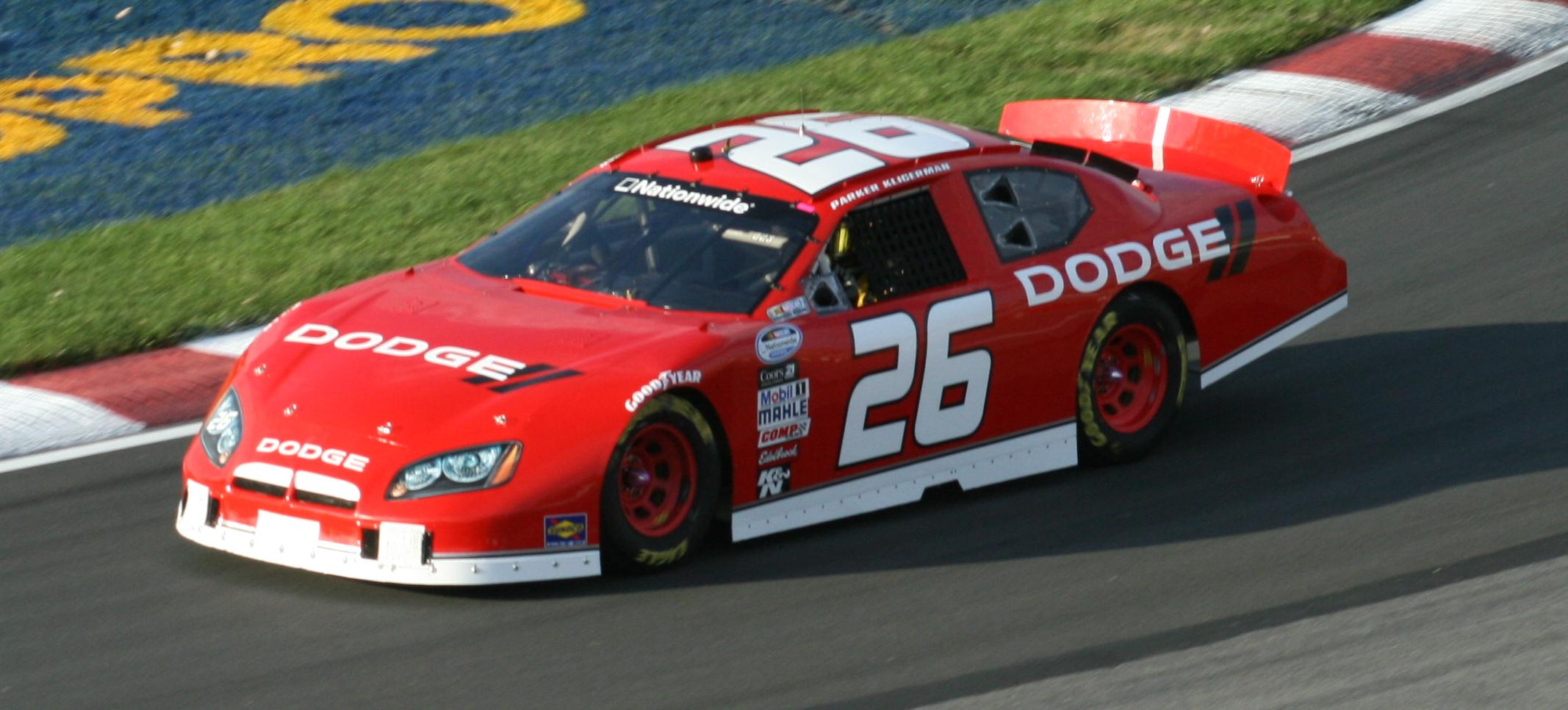
Parker Kligerman in 2010

In an alliance with K-Automotive Racing (owned by Brad Keselowski's brother Brian), Penske fielded the 26 car in select races in 2010, primarily Car of Tomorrow races. Nineteen-year-old Parker Kligerman debuted in the car at Daytona with Discount Tire, starting on the outside pole and finishing thirteenth. His next race was Montreal, where he scored a strong 8th-place finish. He then finished fifteenth at Richmond. At Charlotte in October, Kligerman qualified eighth, but crashed after only three laps and finished last. Sam Hornish Jr. ran the season finale in the 26, finishing 21st.

==== Car No. 26 results ====
| Year | Driver | No. | Make | 1 | 2 | 3 | 4 | 5 | 6 | 7 | 8 | 9 | 10 | 11 | 12 | 13 | 14 | 15 | 16 | 17 | 18 | 19 | 20 | 21 | 22 | 23 | 24 | 25 | 26 | 27 | 28 | 29 | 30 | 31 | 32 | 33 | 34 | 35 | Owners | Pts |
|---|---|---|---|---|---|---|---|---|---|---|---|---|---|---|---|---|---|---|---|---|---|---|---|---|---|---|---|---|---|---|---|---|---|---|---|---|---|---|---|---|
| 2010 | Parker Kligerman | 26 | Dodge | DAY | CAL | LVS | BRI | NSH | PHO | TEX | TAL | RCH | DAR | DOV | CLT | NSH | KEN | ROA | NHA | DAY; 13 | CHI | GTY | IRP | IOW | GLN | MCH | BRI | CGV; 8 | ATL | RCH; 15 | DOV | KAN | CAL | CLT; 43 | GTY | TEX | PHO | | | |
| 2010 | Sam Hornish Jr. | 26 | Dodge | | | | | | | | | | | | | | | | | | | | | | | | | | | | | | | | | | | HOM; 26 | | |

=== Car No. 39 history ===
For 2005, Ryan Newman raced in nine races. In the last seven he competed in, he won the first five, came in sixteenth at Texas, then won the season finale at Homestead finishing thirty-fourth in the points standings. He also got a pair of third-place finishes before those six wins. In 2006, Kurt Busch and Newman drove a limited schedule in a Penske No. 39 for Busch, and an Alltel No. 39 for Newman. Though Newman got a highest finish of second at Auto Club, Busch ended up notching two wins at Texas and Watkins Glen. In the other five races he competed in, he came in the top five in all but one, finishing twenty-first at Michigan before finishing thirty-ninth in points. IndyCar Champion Sam Hornish Jr. began racing the No. 39 in the last two races of the year, crashing out of both races. The only race for the 39 in 2007 was at Watkins Glen International, where Kurt Busch started on the pole and finished third.

==== Car No. 39 results ====
| Year | Driver | No. | Make | 1 | 2 | 3 | 4 | 5 | 6 | 7 | 8 | 9 | 10 | 11 | 12 | 13 | 14 | 15 | 16 | 17 | 18 | 19 | 20 | 21 | 22 | 23 | 24 | 25 | 26 | 27 | 28 | 29 | 30 | 31 | 32 | 33 | 34 | 35 | Owners | Pts |
|---|---|---|---|---|---|---|---|---|---|---|---|---|---|---|---|---|---|---|---|---|---|---|---|---|---|---|---|---|---|---|---|---|---|---|---|---|---|---|---|---|
| 2005 | Ryan Newman | 39 | Dodge | DAY | CAL | MXC | LVS | ATL | NSH | BRI | TEX | PHO | TAL | DAR | RCH | CLT; 3 | DOV | NSH | KEN | MLW | DAY | CHI; 3^{*} | NHA | PPR | GTY | IRP | GLN; 1 | MCH; 1 | BRI; 1^{*} | CAL | RCH | DOV; 1^{*} | KAN | CLT; 1^{*} | MEM | TEX; 16^{*} | PHO | HOM; 1 | | |
| 2006 | Ryan Newman | 39 | Dodge | DAY | CAL; 2 | MXC | LVS | ATL; 39 | BRI | | | | | RCH; 5 | DAR; 30 | | | | | | | | | | | | | | BRI; 6^{*} | CAL | RCH | DOV | KAN | CLT | MEM | TEX | | | | |
| 2006 | Kurt Busch | 39 | Dodge | | | | | | | TEX; 1* | NSH | PHO; 4 | TAL | | | CLT; 2 | DOV; 3 | NSH | KEN | MLW | DAY | CHI; 6* | NHA | MAR | GTY | IRP | GLN; 1* | MCH; 21 | | | | | | | | | | | | |
| 2006 | Sam Hornish Jr. | 39 | Dodge | | | | | | | | | | | | | | | | | | | | | | | | | | | | | | | | | | PHO; 36 | HOM; 43 | | |
| 2007 | Kurt Busch | 39 | Dodge | DAY | CAL | MXC | LVS | ATL | BRI | NSH | TEX | PHO | TAL | RCH | DAR | CLT | DOV | NSH | KEN | MLW | NHA | DAY | CHI | GTY | IRP | CGV | GLN; 3 | MCH | BRI | CAL | RCH | DOV | KAN | CLT | MEM | TEX | PHO | HOM | | |

=== Car No. 48 history ===
In 2013, Penske ran a third team part-time, numbered 48. Joey Logano ran the car at Watkins Glen with Discount Tire as the sponsor, starting third and finishing 21st. Ryan Blaney then ran the car at Phoenix with AutoZone, finishing tenth. Brad Keselowski ran the car at Homestead with Discount Tire, winning the race.

==== Car No. 48 results ====
| Year | Driver | No. | Make | 1 | 2 | 3 | 4 | 5 | 6 | 7 | 8 | 9 | 10 | 11 | 12 | 13 | 14 | 15 | 16 | 17 | 18 | 19 | 20 | 21 | 22 | 23 | 24 | 25 | 26 | 27 | 28 | 29 | 30 | 31 | 32 | 33 | Owners | Pts |
|---|---|---|---|---|---|---|---|---|---|---|---|---|---|---|---|---|---|---|---|---|---|---|---|---|---|---|---|---|---|---|---|---|---|---|---|---|---|---|
| 2013 | Joey Logano | 48 | Ford | DAY | PHO | LVS | BRI | CAL | TEX | RCH | TAL | DAR | CLT | DOV | IOW | MCH | ROA | KEN | DAY | NHA | CHI | IND | IOW | GLN; 21 | MOH | BRI | ATL | RCH | CHI | KEN | DOV | KAN | CLT | TEX | | | | |
| 2013 | Ryan Blaney | 48 | Ford | | | | | | | | | | | | | | | | | | | | | | | | | | | | | | | | PHO; 10 | | | |
| 2013 | Brad Keselowski | 48 | Ford | | | | | | | | | | | | | | | | | | | | | | | | | | | | | | | | | HOM; 1 | | |

== Truck Series ==
=== Truck No. 22 history ===
Penske fielded the No. 22 truck in 1996 in ten races, with Ricky Johnson driving three, Kenny Wallace six, and Rusty Wallace one. Johnson failed to qualify for another race at Colorado National Speedway. The team scored a best finish of fourth at North Wilkesboro Speedway with Kenny Wallace driving.

==== Truck No. 22 results ====
| Year | Driver | No. | Make | 1 | 2 | 3 | 4 | 5 | 6 | 7 | 8 | 9 | 10 | 11 | 12 | 13 | 14 | 15 | 16 | 17 | 18 | 19 | 20 | 21 | 22 | 23 | 24 | NCTC | Pts | Ref |
|---|---|---|---|---|---|---|---|---|---|---|---|---|---|---|---|---|---|---|---|---|---|---|---|---|---|---|---|---|---|---|
| 1996 | Ricky Johnson | 22 | Ford | HOM | PHO | POR; 25 | EVG; 15 | TUS | CNS; DNQ | | | | | | | | | GLN; 30 | NSV | | | | | | | | | – | – | |
| 1996 | Kenny Wallace | 22 | Ford | | | | | | | HPT; 18 | BRI | | | | | IRP; 7 | FLM | | | RCH; 14 | NHA | MAR | NWS; 4 | SON | MMR; 33 | PHO; 12 | LVS | – | – | |
| 1996 | Rusty Wallace | 22 | Ford | | | | | | | | | NZH; 9 | MLW | LVL | I70 | | | | | | | | | | | | | – | – | |
