= 2018 Quaker State 400 =

Race details
- Race 19 of 36 in the 2018 Monster Energy NASCAR Cup Series
- Layout of Kentucky Speedway
- Date: July 14, 2018
- Location: Kentucky Speedway in Sparta, Kentucky
- Course: Permanent racing facility
- Course length: 1.5 miles (2.4 km)
- Distance: 267 laps, 400.5 mi (640.8 km)
- Average speed: 150.454 miles per hour (242.132 km/h)

Pole position
| Driver | Martin Truex Jr. | Furniture Row Racing |
- Time: 28.588

Most laps led
| Driver | Martin Truex Jr. | Furniture Row Racing |
- Laps: 174

Winner
| No. 78 | Martin Truex Jr. | Furniture Row Racing |

Television in the United States
- Network: NBCSN
- Announcers: Rick Allen, Jeff Burton, Steve Letarte and Dale Earnhardt Jr.
- Nielsen ratings: 1.3/1.33 (Overnight)

Radio in the United States
- Radio: PRN
- Booth announcers: Doug Rice and Mark Garrow
- Turn announcers: Rob Albright (1 & 2) and Pat Patterson (3 & 4)

The 2018 Quaker State 400 presented by Walmart is a Monster Energy NASCAR Cup Series race held on July 14, 2018, at Kentucky Speedway in Sparta, Kentucky. Contested over 267 laps on the 1.5-mile (2.4 km) speedway, it was the 19th race of the 2018 Monster Energy NASCAR Cup Series season.

== Report ==
=== Background ===
The sixth running of the Quaker State 400 was held in Sparta, Kentucky at Kentucky Speedway on July 9, 2016. The track is a 1.5-mile (2.4 km) tri-oval speedway owned by Speedway Motorsports, Inc. Kentucky Speedway, which has also hosted the ARCA Racing Series, NASCAR Camping World Truck Series, NASCAR Xfinity Series, and the Indy Racing League, has a grandstand seating capacity of 107,000.

==== Entry list ====
| No. | Driver | Team | Manufacturer |
|---|---|---|---|
| 00 | Landon Cassill | StarCom Racing | Chevrolet |
| 1 | Jamie McMurray | Chip Ganassi Racing | Chevrolet |
| 2 | Brad Keselowski | Team Penske | Ford |
| 3 | Austin Dillon | Richard Childress Racing | Chevrolet |
| 4 | Kevin Harvick | Stewart–Haas Racing | Ford |
| 6 | Matt Kenseth | Roush Fenway Racing | Ford |
| 7 | Jesse Little (i) | Premium Motorsports | Chevrolet |
| 9 | Chase Elliott | Hendrick Motorsports | Chevrolet |
| 10 | Aric Almirola | Stewart–Haas Racing | Ford |
| 11 | Denny Hamlin | Joe Gibbs Racing | Toyota |
| 12 | Ryan Blaney | Team Penske | Ford |
| 13 | Ty Dillon | Germain Racing | Chevrolet |
| 14 | Clint Bowyer | Stewart–Haas Racing | Ford |
| 15 | Ross Chastain (i) | Premium Motorsports | Chevrolet |
| 17 | Ricky Stenhouse Jr. | Roush Fenway Racing | Ford |
| 18 | Kyle Busch | Joe Gibbs Racing | Toyota |
| 19 | Daniel Suárez | Joe Gibbs Racing | Toyota |
| 20 | Erik Jones | Joe Gibbs Racing | Toyota |
| 21 | Paul Menard | Wood Brothers Racing | Ford |
| 22 | Joey Logano | Team Penske | Ford |
| 23 | J. J. Yeley (i) | BK Racing | Toyota |
| 24 | William Byron (R) | Hendrick Motorsports | Chevrolet |
| 31 | Ryan Newman | Richard Childress Racing | Chevrolet |
| 32 | Matt DiBenedetto | Go Fas Racing | Ford |
| 34 | Michael McDowell | Front Row Motorsports | Ford |
| 37 | Chris Buescher | JTG Daugherty Racing | Chevrolet |
| 38 | David Ragan | Front Row Motorsports | Ford |
| 41 | Kurt Busch | Stewart–Haas Racing | Ford |
| 42 | Kyle Larson | Chip Ganassi Racing | Chevrolet |
| 43 | Bubba Wallace (R) | Richard Petty Motorsports | Chevrolet |
| 47 | A. J. Allmendinger | JTG Daugherty Racing | Chevrolet |
| 48 | Jimmie Johnson | Hendrick Motorsports | Chevrolet |
| 51 | B. J. McLeod (i) | Rick Ware Racing | Chevrolet |
| 66 | Timmy Hill (i) | MBM Motorsports | Toyota |
| 72 | Corey LaJoie | TriStar Motorsports | Chevrolet |
| 78 | Martin Truex Jr. | Furniture Row Racing | Toyota |
| 88 | Alex Bowman | Hendrick Motorsports | Chevrolet |
| 95 | Kasey Kahne | Leavine Family Racing | Chevrolet |
| 99 | Garrett Smithley (i) | StarCom Racing | Chevrolet |
Official entry list

== Practice ==
=== First practice ===
Kyle Larson was the fastest in the first practice session with a time of 29.053 seconds and a speed of 185.867 mph (299.124 km/h).

| Pos | No. | Driver | Team | Manufacturer | Time | Speed |
|---|---|---|---|---|---|---|
| 1 | 42 | Kyle Larson | Chip Ganassi Racing | Chevrolet | 29.053 | 185.867 |
| 2 | 12 | Ryan Blaney | Team Penske | Ford | 29.244 | 184.653 |
| 3 | 22 | Joey Logano | Team Penske | Ford | 29.300 | 184.300 |
Official first practice results

=== Final practice ===
Erik Jones was the fastest in the final practice session with a time of 28.762 seconds and a speed of 187.748 mph (302.151 km/h).

| Pos | No. | Driver | Team | Manufacturer | Time | Speed |
|---|---|---|---|---|---|---|
| 1 | 20 | Erik Jones | Joe Gibbs Racing | Toyota | 28.762 | 187.748 |
| 2 | 12 | Ryan Blaney | Team Penske | Ford | 28.829 | 187.311 |
| 3 | 18 | Kyle Busch | Joe Gibbs Racing | Toyota | 28.954 | 186.503 |
Official final practice results

== Qualifying ==
Martin Truex Jr. scored the pole for the race with a time of 28.588 and a speed of 188.890 mph (303.989 km/h).

=== Qualifying results ===
| Pos | No. | Driver | Team | Manufacturer | R1 | R2 | R3 |
|---|---|---|---|---|---|---|---|
| 1 | 78 | Martin Truex Jr. | Furniture Row Racing | Toyota | 28.927 | 28.575 | 28.588 |
| 2 | 20 | Erik Jones | Joe Gibbs Racing | Toyota | 28.773 | 28.763 | 28.611 |
| 3 | 4 | Kevin Harvick | Stewart–Haas Racing | Ford | 28.745 | 28.791 | 28.640 |
| 4 | 2 | Brad Keselowski | Team Penske | Ford | 28.851 | 28.757 | 28.664 |
| 5 | 18 | Kyle Busch | Joe Gibbs Racing | Toyota | 28.884 | 28.662 | 28.692 |
| 6 | 21 | Paul Menard | Wood Brothers Racing | Ford | 28.878 | 28.813 | 28.705 |
| 7 | 12 | Ryan Blaney | Team Penske | Ford | 28.911 | 28.798 | 28.732 |
| 8 | 14 | Clint Bowyer | Stewart–Haas Racing | Ford | 28.902 | 28.769 | 28.770 |
| 9 | 41 | Kurt Busch | Stewart–Haas Racing | Ford | 29.018 | 28.780 | 28.780 |
| 10 | 31 | Ryan Newman | Richard Childress Racing | Chevrolet | 28.906 | 28.767 | 28.866 |
| 11 | 19 | Daniel Suárez | Joe Gibbs Racing | Toyota | 28.898 | 28.831 | 28.877 |
| 12 | 10 | Aric Almirola | Stewart–Haas Racing | Ford | 28.937 | 28.707 | 28.895 |
| 13 | 3 | Austin Dillon | Richard Childress Racing | Chevrolet | 28.783 | 28.851 | — |
| 14 | 17 | Ricky Stenhouse Jr. | Roush Fenway Racing | Ford | 29.143 | 28.866 | — |
| 15 | 88 | Alex Bowman | Hendrick Motorsports | Chevrolet | 28.977 | 28.935 | — |
| 16 | 9 | Chase Elliott | Hendrick Motorsports | Chevrolet | 29.074 | 28.947 | — |
| 17 | 6 | Matt Kenseth | Roush Fenway Racing | Ford | 29.222 | 28.951 | — |
| 18 | 42 | Kyle Larson | Chip Ganassi Racing | Chevrolet | 29.152 | 28.979 | — |
| 19 | 22 | Joey Logano | Team Penske | Ford | 29.205 | 28.981 | — |
| 20 | 37 | Chris Buescher | JTG Daugherty Racing | Chevrolet | 29.036 | 29.004 | — |
| 21 | 24 | William Byron (R) | Hendrick Motorsports | Chevrolet | 29.121 | 29.010 | — |
| 22 | 1 | Jamie McMurray | Chip Ganassi Racing | Chevrolet | 29.135 | 29.050 | — |
| 23 | 34 | Michael McDowell | Front Row Motorsports | Ford | 29.175 | 29.116 | — |
| 24 | 38 | David Ragan | Front Row Motorsports | Ford | 29.235 | 29.234 | — |
| 25 | 43 | Bubba Wallace (R) | Richard Petty Motorsports | Chevrolet | 29.263 | — | — |
| 26 | 47 | A. J. Allmendinger | JTG Daugherty Racing | Chevrolet | 29.271 | — | — |
| 27 | 48 | Jimmie Johnson | Hendrick Motorsports | Chevrolet | 29.281 | — | — |
| 28 | 13 | Ty Dillon | Germain Racing | Chevrolet | 29.533 | — | — |
| 29 | 95 | Kasey Kahne | Leavine Family Racing | Chevrolet | 29.582 | — | — |
| 30 | 15 | Ross Chastain (i) | Premium Motorsports | Chevrolet | 29.805 | — | — |
| 31 | 72 | Corey LaJoie | TriStar Motorsports | Chevrolet | 29.936 | — | — |
| 32 | 23 | J. J. Yeley (i) | BK Racing | Toyota | 30.022 | — | — |
| 33 | 00 | Landon Cassill | StarCom Racing | Chevrolet | 30.150 | — | — |
| 34 | 51 | B. J. McLeod (i) | Rick Ware Racing | Chevrolet | 30.357 | — | — |
| 35 | 99 | Garrett Smithley (i) | StarCom Racing | Chevrolet | 30.649 | — | — |
| 36 | 11 | Denny Hamlin | Joe Gibbs Racing | Toyota | 0.000 | — | — |
| 37 | 32 | Matt DiBenedetto | Go Fas Racing | Ford | 0.000 | — | — |
| 38 | 7 | Jesse Little (i) | Premium Motorsports | Chevrolet | 0.000 | — | — |
| 39 | 66 | Timmy Hill (i) | MBM Motorsports | Toyota | 0.000 | — | — |
Official qualifying results

== Race ==
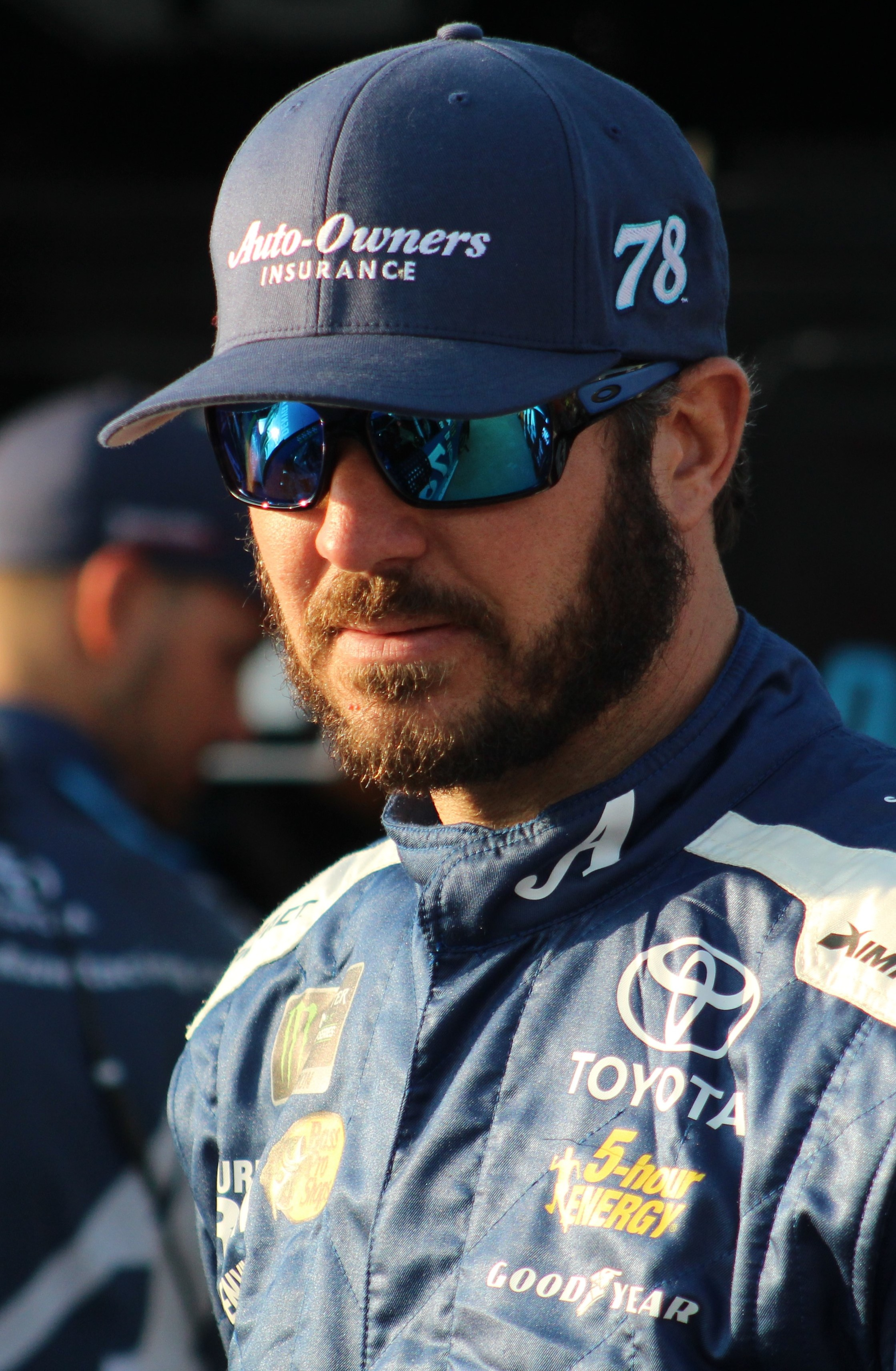
Martin Truex Jr. swept all three stages and won the race from the pole position.

=== Stage Results ===
Stage 1 Laps: 80

| Pos | No | Driver | Team | Manufacturer | Points |
|---|---|---|---|---|---|
| 1 | 78 | Martin Truex Jr. | Furniture Row Racing | Toyota | 10 |
| 2 | 4 | Kevin Harvick | Stewart–Haas Racing | Ford | 9 |
| 3 | 18 | Kyle Busch | Joe Gibbs Racing | Toyota | 8 |
| 4 | 12 | Ryan Blaney | Team Penske | Ford | 7 |
| 5 | 21 | Paul Menard | Wood Brothers Racing | Ford | 6 |
| 6 | 14 | Clint Bowyer | Stewart–Haas Racing | Ford | 5 |
| 7 | 19 | Daniel Suárez | Joe Gibbs Racing | Toyota | 4 |
| 8 | 42 | Kyle Larson | Chip Ganassi Racing | Chevrolet | 3 |
| 9 | 10 | Aric Almirola | Stewart–Haas Racing | Ford | 2 |
| 10 | 9 | Chase Elliott | Hendrick Motorsports | Chevrolet | 1 |
Official stage one results

Stage 2 Laps: 80

| Pos | No | Driver | Team | Manufacturer | Points |
|---|---|---|---|---|---|
| 1 | 78 | Martin Truex Jr. | Furniture Row Racing | Toyota | 10 |
| 2 | 18 | Kyle Busch | Joe Gibbs Racing | Toyota | 9 |
| 3 | 12 | Ryan Blaney | Team Penske | Ford | 8 |
| 4 | 4 | Kevin Harvick | Stewart–Haas Racing | Ford | 7 |
| 5 | 42 | Kyle Larson | Chip Ganassi Racing | Chevrolet | 6 |
| 6 | 14 | Clint Bowyer | Stewart–Haas Racing | Ford | 5 |
| 7 | 41 | Kurt Busch | Stewart–Haas Racing | Ford | 4 |
| 8 | 22 | Joey Logano | Team Penske | Ford | 3 |
| 9 | 20 | Erik Jones | Joe Gibbs Racing | Toyota | 2 |
| 10 | 21 | Paul Menard | Wood Brothers Racing | Ford | 1 |
Official stage two results

=== Final Stage Results ===
Stage 3 Laps: 107

| Pos | Grid | No | Driver | Team | Manufacturer | Laps | Points |
|---|---|---|---|---|---|---|---|
| 1 | 1 | 78 | Martin Truex Jr. | Furniture Row Racing | Toyota | 267 | 60 |
| 2 | 7 | 12 | Ryan Blaney | Team Penske | Ford | 267 | 50 |
| 3 | 4 | 2 | Brad Keselowski | Team Penske | Ford | 267 | 34 |
| 4 | 5 | 18 | Kyle Busch | Joe Gibbs Racing | Toyota | 267 | 50 |
| 5 | 3 | 4 | Kevin Harvick | Stewart–Haas Racing | Ford | 267 | 48 |
| 6 | 9 | 41 | Kurt Busch | Stewart–Haas Racing | Ford | 267 | 35 |
| 7 | 2 | 20 | Erik Jones | Joe Gibbs Racing | Toyota | 267 | 32 |
| 8 | 12 | 10 | Aric Almirola | Stewart–Haas Racing | Ford | 267 | 31 |
| 9 | 18 | 42 | Kyle Larson | Chip Ganassi Racing | Chevrolet | 267 | 37 |
| 10 | 19 | 22 | Joey Logano | Team Penske | Ford | 267 | 30 |
| 11 | 6 | 21 | Paul Menard | Wood Brothers Racing | Ford | 267 | 33 |
| 12 | 8 | 14 | Clint Bowyer | Stewart–Haas Racing | Ford | 267 | 35 |
| 13 | 16 | 9 | Chase Elliott | Hendrick Motorsports | Chevrolet | 267 | 25 |
| 14 | 27 | 48 | Jimmie Johnson | Hendrick Motorsports | Chevrolet | 267 | 23 |
| 15 | 11 | 19 | Daniel Suárez | Joe Gibbs Racing | Toyota | 267 | 26 |
| 16 | 36 | 11 | Denny Hamlin | Joe Gibbs Racing | Toyota | 267 | 21 |
| 17 | 22 | 1 | Jamie McMurray | Chip Ganassi Racing | Chevrolet | 267 | 20 |
| 18 | 24 | 38 | David Ragan | Front Row Motorsports | Ford | 267 | 19 |
| 19 | 17 | 6 | Matt Kenseth | Roush Fenway Racing | Ford | 267 | 18 |
| 20 | 21 | 24 | William Byron (R) | Hendrick Motorsports | Chevrolet | 267 | 17 |
| 21 | 10 | 31 | Ryan Newman | Richard Childress Racing | Chevrolet | 267 | 16 |
| 22 | 13 | 3 | Austin Dillon | Richard Childress Racing | Chevrolet | 266 | 15 |
| 23 | 20 | 37 | Chris Buescher | JTG Daugherty Racing | Chevrolet | 266 | 14 |
| 24 | 23 | 34 | Michael McDowell | Front Row Motorsports | Ford | 266 | 13 |
| 25 | 29 | 95 | Kasey Kahne | Leavine Family Racing | Chevrolet | 266 | 12 |
| 26 | 14 | 17 | Ricky Stenhouse Jr. | Roush Fenway Racing | Ford | 266 | 11 |
| 27 | 25 | 43 | Bubba Wallace (R) | Richard Petty Motorsports | Chevrolet | 264 | 10 |
| 28 | 30 | 15 | Ross Chastain (i) | Premium Motorsports | Chevrolet | 263 | 0 |
| 29 | 28 | 13 | Ty Dillon | Germain Racing | Chevrolet | 263 | 8 |
| 30 | 26 | 47 | A. J. Allmendinger | JTG Daugherty Racing | Chevrolet | 262 | 7 |
| 31 | 31 | 72 | Corey LaJoie | TriStar Motorsports | Chevrolet | 260 | 6 |
| 32 | 34 | 51 | B. J. McLeod (i) | Rick Ware Racing | Chevrolet | 256 | 0 |
| 33 | 33 | 00 | Landon Cassill | StarCom Racing | Chevrolet | 256 | 4 |
| 34 | 39 | 66 | Timmy Hill (i) | MBM Motorsports | Toyota | 254 | 0 |
| 35 | 38 | 7 | Jesse Little (i) | Premium Motorsports | Chevrolet | 253 | 0 |
| 36 | 35 | 99 | Garrett Smithley (i) | StarCom Racing | Chevrolet | 251 | 0 |
| 37 | 37 | 32 | Matt DiBenedetto | Go Fas Racing | Ford | 200 | 1 |
| 38 | 32 | 23 | J. J. Yeley (i) | BK Racing | Toyota | 199 | 0 |
| 39 | 15 | 88 | Alex Bowman | Hendrick Motorsports | Chevrolet | 108 | 1 |
Official race results

=== Race statistics ===
- Lead changes: 7 among different drivers
- Cautions/Laps: 4 for 22
- Red flags: 0
- Time of race: 2 hours, 39 minutes and 43 seconds
- Average speed: 150.454 miles per hour (242.132 km/h)

== Media ==
=== Television ===
NBC Sports covered the race on the television side. Rick Allen, Jeff Burton, Steve Letarte and Dale Earnhardt Jr. had the call in the booth for the race. Dave Burns, Parker Kligerman, Marty Snider and Kelli Stavast reported from pit lane during the race.

NBCSN
| Booth announcers | Pit reporters |
|---|---|
| Lap-by-lap: Rick Allen; Color-commentator: Jeff Burton; Color-commentator: Steve Letarte; Color-commentator: Dale Earnhardt Jr. | Dave Burns; Parker Kligerman; Marty Snider; Kelli Stavast |

=== Radio ===
PRN had the radio call for the race, which was simulcast on Sirius XM NASCAR Radio.

PRN
| Booth announcers | Turn announcers | Pit reporters |
|---|---|---|
| Lead announcer: Doug Rice; Announcer: Mark Garrow | Turns 1 & 2: Rob Albright; Turns 3 & 4: Pat Patterson | Brad Gillie; Brett McMillan; Jim Noble; Steve Richards |

== Standings after the race ==
Drivers' Championship standings

| | Pos | Driver | Points |
|---|---|---|---|
| | 1 | Kyle Busch | 799 |
| | 2 | Kevin Harvick | 740 (–59) |
| | 3 | Martin Truex Jr. | 689 (–110) |
| | 4 | Joey Logano | 648 (–151) |
| | 5 | Brad Keselowski | 630 (–169) |
| | 6 | Clint Bowyer | 629 (–170) |
| | 7 | Kurt Busch | 601 (–198) |
| | 8 | Kyle Larson | 581 (–218) |
| | 9 | Denny Hamlin | 559 (–240) |
| 1 | 10 | Ryan Blaney | 546 (–253) |
| 1 | 11 | Aric Almirola | 534 (–265) |
| | 12 | Jimmie Johnson | 484 (–315) |
| | 13 | Erik Jones | 480 (–319) |
| | 14 | Chase Elliott | 469 (–330) |
| | 15 | Alex Bowman | 427 (–372) |
| | 16 | Ricky Stenhouse Jr. | 418 (–381) |
Official driver's standings

Manufacturers' Championship standings

| Pos | Manufacturer | Points |
|---|---|---|
| 1 | Toyota | 700 |
| 2 | Ford | 679 (–21) |
| 3 | Chevrolet | 609 (–91) |
Official manufacturers' standings

- Note: Only the first 16 positions are included for the driver standings.
- . – Driver has clinched a position in the Monster Energy NASCAR Cup Series playoffs.

| Previous race: 2018 Coke Zero Sugar 400 | Monster Energy NASCAR Cup Series; 2018 season | Next race: 2018 Foxwoods Resort Casino 301 |
