= Quaker State 400 =

Quaker State 400 may refer to two races:

- Quaker State 400 (Atlanta), the current NASCAR Cup Series race at Atlanta Motor Speedway, since renamed Dollar Tree 400
- Quaker State 400 (Kentucky), the former NASCAR Cup Series race at Kentucky Speedway
