= Get Bioethanol Green Flag Restart Award =

American Ethanol Green Flag Restart Award
- Sport: Auto Racing
- League: NASCAR
- Competition: NASCAR Cup Series
- Sponsored by: Get Bioethanol

History
- First award: 2011
- Editions: 12
- First winner: Matt Kenseth
- Most wins: Kevin Harvick
- Most recent: Kyle Larson
- Website: americanethanolracing.com

The Get Bioethanol Green Flag Restart Award goes to the eligible driver that records the fastest average speed on restarts and finishes the race on the lead lap. A per-race $5,000 award is given to the winning driver, and a year-end $100,000 is given to the driver who wins the most awards during the season. The award is an official NASCAR contingency award sponsored by Get Bioethanol.

The inaugural award individual race award was presented to Paul Menard for his performance at the Daytona 500 at Daytona International Speedway on 20 February 2011.

For the 2023 season, NASCAR and Growth Energy changed the name of the award to "Get Bioethanol Green Flag Restart Award".

== Season winners ==
Year	Winner	Race award wins
2011	Matt Kenseth	7
2012	Jimmie Johnson	7
2013	Kyle Busch	8
2014	Kevin Harvick	10
2015	Kevin Harvick	6
2016	Kevin Harvick	7
2017	Martin Truex Jr.	9
2018	Kevin Harvick	10
2019	Martin Truex Jr.	8
2020	Kevin Harvick	10
2021	Kyle Larson	8
2022	Christopher Bell	4

== 2011 season ==
=== Individual race award winners ===
No.	Winner	Race Title	Track	Date
		Budweiser Shootout	Daytona International Speedway, Daytona Beach	February 12
		Gatorade Duel	Daytona International Speedway, Daytona Beach	February 17
1	Paul Menard	Daytona 500	Daytona International Speedway, Daytona Beach	February 20
2	Kurt Busch	Subway Fresh Fit 500	Phoenix International Raceway, Phoenix	February 27
3	Tony Stewart	Kobalt Tools 400	Las Vegas Motor Speedway, Las Vegas, Nevada	March 6
4	Martin Truex Jr.	Jeff Byrd 500 presented by Food City	Bristol Motor Speedway, Bristol	March 20
5	Kurt Busch	Auto Club 400	Auto Club Speedway, Fontana	March 27
6	Clint Bowyer	Goody's Fast Relief 500	Martinsville Speedway, Ridgeway	April 3
7	Matt Kenseth	Samsung Mobile 500	Texas Motor Speedway, Fort Worth	April 9
8	Joey Logano	Aaron's 499	Talladega Superspeedway, Talladega	April 17
9	Denny Hamlin	Crown Royal Presents the Matthew and Daniel Hansen 400	Richmond International Raceway, Richmond	April 30
10	Kasey Kahne	Showtime Southern 500	Darlington Raceway, Darlington	May 7
11	Jimmie Johnson	FedEx 400 benefiting Autism Speaks	Dover International Speedway, Dover	May 15
		Sprint Showdown and All-Star Race XXVII	Charlotte Motor Speedway, Concord	May 21
12	Matt Kenseth	Coca-Cola 600	Charlotte Motor Speedway, Concord	May 29
13	Tony Stewart	STP 400	Kansas Speedway, Kansas City	June 5
14	Denny Hamlin	5-hour Energy 500	Pocono Raceway, Long Pond	June 12
15	Matt Kenseth	Heluva Good! Sour Cream Dips 400	Michigan International Speedway, Brooklyn	June 19
16	Clint Bowyer	Toyota/Save Mart 350	Infineon Raceway, Sonoma	June 26
17	Matt Kenseth	Coke Zero 400 powered by Coca-Cola	Daytona International Speedway, Daytona Beach	July 2
18	Kyle Busch	Quaker State 400	Kentucky Speedway, Sparta	July 9
19	Jeff Gordon	Lenox Industrial Tools 301	New Hampshire Motor Speedway, Loudon	July 17
20	Jeff Gordon	Brickyard 400 presented by Big Machine Records.com	Indianapolis Motor Speedway, Speedway	July 31
21	Kyle Busch	Good Sam RV Insurance 500	Pocono Raceway, Long Pond	August 7
22	Marcos Ambrose	Heluva Good! Sour Cream Dips at The Glen	Watkins Glen International, Watkins Glen	August 14
23	Matt Kenseth	Pure Michigan 400	Michigan International Speedway, Brooklyn	August 21
24	Brad Keselowski	Irwin Tools Night Race	Bristol Motor Speedway, Bristol	August 27
25	Matt Kenseth	AdvoCare 500	Atlanta Motor Speedway, Hampton	September 4
26	Kevin Harvick	Wonderful Pistachios 400	Richmond International Raceway, Richmond	September 10
Chase for the Championship
27	Kurt Busch	GEICO 400	Chicagoland Speedway, Joliet	September 18
28	Jeff Gordon	Sylvania 300	New Hampshire Motor Speedway, Loudon	September 25
29	Kurt Busch	AAA 400	Dover International Speedway, Dover	October 2
30	Matt Kenseth	Hollywood Casino 400	Kansas Speedway, Kansas City	October 9
31	Kevin Harvick	Bank of America 500	Charlotte Motor Speedway, Concord	October 15
32	Clint Bowyer	Good Sam Club 500	Talladega Superspeedway, Talladega	October 23
33	Jimmie Johnson	Tums Fast Relief 500	Martinsville Speedway, Ridgeway	October 30
34	Tony Stewart	AAA Texas 500	Texas Motor Speedway, Fort Worth	November 6
35	Tony Stewart	Kobalt Tools 500	Phoenix International Raceway, Avondale	November 13
36	Carl Edwards	Ford 400	Homestead-Miami Speedway, Homestead	November 20

=== Total Award Wins by Driver ===
Winner	Wins
Matt Kenseth	7
Kurt Busch	4
Tony Stewart	4
Clint Bowyer	3
Jeff Gordon	3
Denny Hamlin	2
Jimmie Johnson	2
Kyle Busch	2
Kevin Harvick	2
Joey Logano	1
Brad Keselowski	1
Carl Edwards	1
Kasey Kahne	1
Marcos Ambrose	1
Martin Truex Jr.	1
Paul Menard	1

== 2012 season ==
=== Individual race award winners ===
No.	Winner	Race Title	Track	Date
		Budweiser Shootout	Daytona International Speedway, Daytona Beach	February 18
		Gatorade Duel	Daytona International Speedway, Daytona Beach	February 23
1	Bobby Labonte	Daytona 500	Daytona International Speedway, Daytona Beach	February 27†
2	Kevin Harvick	Subway Fresh Fit 500	Phoenix International Raceway, Phoenix	March 4
3	Tony Stewart	Kobalt Tools 400	Las Vegas Motor Speedway, Las Vegas	March 11
4	Brad Keselowski	Food City 500	Bristol Motor Speedway, Bristol	March 18
5	Kyle Busch	Auto Club 400	Auto Club Speedway, Fontana	March 25
6	Dale Earnhardt Jr.	Goody's Fast Relief 500	Martinsville Speedway, Ridgeway	April 1
7	Greg Biffle	Samsung Mobile 500	Texas Motor Speedway, Fort Worth	April 14
8	Martin Truex Jr.	STP 400	Kansas Speedway, Kansas City	April 22
9	Carl Edwards	Capital City 400 presented by Virginia is for Lovers	Richmond International Raceway, Richmond	April 28
10	Travis Kvapil	Aaron's 499	Talladega Superspeedway, Talladega	May 6
11	Jimmie Johnson	Bojangles' Southern 500	Darlington Raceway, Darlington	May 12
		Sprint Showdown and All-Star Race XXVIII	Charlotte Motor Speedway, Concord	May 19
12	Kyle Busch	Coca-Cola 600	Charlotte Motor Speedway, Concord	May 27
13	Jimmie Johnson	FedEx 400 benefiting Autism Speaks	Dover International Speedway, Dover	June 3
14	Joey Logano	Pocono 400 presented by#NASCAR	Pocono Raceway, Long Pond	June 10
15	Greg Biffle	Quicken Loans 400	Michigan International Speedway, Brooklyn	June 17
16	Clint Bowyer	Toyota/Save Mart 350	Sonoma Raceway, Sonoma	June 24
17	Denny Hamlin	Quaker State 400	Kentucky Speedway, Sparta	June 30
18	Joey Logano	Coke Zero 400 powered by Coca-Cola	Daytona International Speedway, Daytona Beach	July 7
19	Kasey Kahne	LENOX Industrial Tools 301	New Hampshire Motor Speedway, Loudon	July 15
20	Jimmie Johnson	Crown Royal presents the Curtiss Shaver 400 at the Brickyard	Indianapolis Motor Speedway, Speedway	July 29
21	Juan Montoya	Pennsylvania 500	Pocono Raceway, Long Pond	August 5
22	Brad Keselowski	NASCAR Sprint Cup Series at The Glen	Watkins Glen International, Watkins Glen	August 12
23	Martin Truex Jr.	Pure Michigan 400	Michigan International Speedway, Brooklyn	August 19
24	Joey Logano	IRWIN Tools Night Race	Bristol Motor Speedway, Bristol	August 25
25	Denny Hamlin	AdvoCare 500	Atlanta Motor Speedway, Hampton	September 2
26	Kevin Harvick	Federated Auto Parts 400	Richmond International Raceway, Richmond	September 8
Chase for the Championship
27	Jimmie Johnson	GEICO 400	Chicagoland Speedway, Joliet	September 16
28	Denny Hamlin	Sylvania 300	New Hampshire Motor Speedway, Loudon	September 23
29	Jimmie Johnson	AAA 400	Dover International Speedway, Dover	September 30
30	Matt Kenseth	Good Sam Roadside Assistance 500	Talladega Superspeedway, Talladega	October 7
31	Greg Biffle	Bank of America 500	Charlotte Motor Speedway, Concord	October 13
32	Matt Kenseth	Hollywood Casino 400	Kansas Speedway, Kansas City	October 21
33	Jimmie Johnson	Tums Fast Relief 500	Martinsville Speedway, Ridgeway	October 28
34	Jimmie Johnson	AAA Texas 500	Texas Motor Speedway, Fort Worth	November 4
35	Kyle Busch	AdvoCare 500	Phoenix International Raceway, Phoenix	November 11
36	Kyle Busch	Ford EcoBoost 400	Homestead-Miami Speedway, Homestead	November 18

=== Total Award Wins by Driver ===
Winner	Wins
Jimmie Johnson	7
Kyle Busch	4
Greg Biffle	3
Denny Hamlin	3
Joey Logano	3
Kevin Harvick	2
Matt Kenseth	2
Brad Keselowski	2
Martin Truex Jr.	2
Clint Bowyer	1
Dale Earnhardt Jr.	1
Carl Edwards	1
Kasey Kahne	1
Travis Kvapil	1
Bobby Labonte	1
Juan Montoya	1
Tony Stewart	1

== 2013 season ==
=== Individual race award winners ===
No.	Winner	Race Title	Track	Date
		Sprint Unlimited	Daytona International Speedway, Daytona Beach	February 16
		Budweiser Duels	Daytona International Speedway, Daytona Beach	February 21
1	Ricky Stenhouse Jr.	Daytona 500	Daytona International Speedway, Daytona Beach	February 24
2	Jimmie Johnson	Subway Fresh Fit 500	Phoenix International Raceway, Avondale	March 3
3	Kasey Kahne	Kobalt Tools 400	Las Vegas Motor Speedway, Las Vegas	March 10
4	Kasey Kahne	Food City 500	Bristol Motor Speedway, Bristol	March 17
5	Kyle Busch	Auto Club 400	Auto Club Speedway, Fontana	March 24
6	Jimmie Johnson	STP Gas Booster 500	Martinsville Speedway, Ridgeway	April 7
7	Kyle Busch	NRA 500	Texas Motor Speedway, Fort Worth	April 13
8	Matt Kenseth	STP 400	Kansas Speedway, Kansas City	April 21
9	Matt Kenseth	Toyota Owners 400	Richmond International Raceway, Richmond	April 27
10	David Gilliland	Aaron's 499	Talladega Superspeedway, Talladega	May 5
11	Kyle Busch	Bojangles' Southern 500	Darlington Raceway, Darlington	May 11
		NASCAR Sprint All-Star Race XXIX	Charlotte Motor Speedway, Concord	May 18
12	Kasey Kahne	Coca-Cola 600	Charlotte Motor Speedway, Concord	May 26
13	Kyle Busch	FedEx 400	Dover International Speedway, Dover	June 2
14	Jimmie Johnson	Pocono 400	Pocono Raceway, Long Pond	June 9
15	Matt Kenseth	Quicken Loans 400	Michigan International Speedway, Brooklyn	June 16
16	Matt Kenseth	Toyota/Save Mart 350	Sonoma Raceway, Sonoma	June 23
17	Jimmie Johnson	Quaker State 400	Kentucky Speedway, Sparta	June 29
18	Travis Kvapil	Coke Zero 400	Daytona International Speedway, Daytona Beach	July 6
19	Kyle Busch	Camping World RV Sales 301	New Hampshire Motor Speedway, Loudon	July 14
20	Jimmie Johnson	Crown Royal 400	Indianapolis Motor Speedway, Speedway	July 28
21	Kasey Kahne	Pennsylvania 400	Pocono Raceway, Long Pond	August 4
22	Kyle Busch	Cheez-It 355 at The Glen	Watkins Glen International, Watkins Glen	August 11
23	Joey Logano	Pure Michigan 400	Michigan International Speedway, Brooklyn	August 18
24	Dale Earnhardt Jr.	Irwin Tools Night Race	Bristol Motor Speedway, Bristol	August 24
25	Jeff Gordon	AdvoCare 500	Atlanta Motor Speedway, Hampton	September 1
26	Kurt Busch	Federated Auto Parts 400	Richmond International Raceway, Richmond	September 7
Chase for the Sprint Cup
27	Kyle Busch	GEICO 400	Chicagoland Speedway, Joliet	September 15
28	Martin Truex Jr.	Sylvania 300	New Hampshire Motor Speedway, Loudon	September 22
29	Dale Earnhardt Jr.	AAA 400	Dover International Speedway, Dover	September 29
30	Kevin Harvick	Hollywood Casino 400	Kansas Speedway, Kansas City	October 6
31	Kasey Kahne	Bank of America 500	Charlotte Motor Speedway, Concord	October 12
32	Michael McDowell	Good Sam Club 500	Talladega Superspeedway, Talladega	October 20
33	Matt Kenseth	Goody's Headache Relief Shot 500	Martinsville Speedway, Ridgeway	October 27
34	Jimmie Johnson	AAA Texas 500	Texas Motor Speedway, Fort Worth	November 3
35	Kevin Harvick	AdvoCare 500	Phoenix International Raceway, Avondale	November 10
36	Matt Kenseth	Ford EcoBoost 400	Homestead-Miami Speedway, Homestead	November 17

=== Total Award Wins by Driver ===
Winner	Wins
Kyle Busch	8
Jimmie Johnson	6
Matt Kenseth	6
Kasey Kahne	5
Dale Earnhardt Jr.	2
Kevin Harvick	2
Kurt Busch	1
David Gilliland	1
Jeff Gordon	1
Joey Logano	1
Travis Kvapil	1
Michael McDowell	1
Martin Truex Jr.	1
Ricky Stenhouse Jr.	1

== 2014 season ==
=== Individual race award winners ===
No.	Winner	Race Title	Track	Date
		Sprint Unlimited	Daytona International Speedway, Daytona Beach	February 15
		Budweiser Duels	Daytona International Speedway, Daytona Beach	February 20
1	Ricky Stenhouse Jr.	Daytona 500	Daytona International Speedway, Daytona Beach	February 23
2	Kevin Harvick	The Profit on CNBC 500	Phoenix International Raceway, Avondale	March 2
3	Jimmie Johnson	Kobalt 400	Las Vegas Motor Speedway, Las Vegas	March 9
4	Matt Kenseth	Food City 500	Bristol Motor Speedway, Bristol	March 16
5	Jimmie Johnson	Auto Club 400	Auto Club Speedway, Fontana	March 23
6	Jimmie Johnson	STP 500	Martinsville Speedway, Ridgeway	March 30
7	Brad Keselowski	Duck Commander 500	Texas Motor Speedway, Fort Worth	April 6
8	Kevin Harvick	Bojangles' Southern 500	Darlington Raceway, Darlington	April 12
9	Brad Keselowski	Toyota Owners 400	Richmond International Raceway, Richmond	April 26
10	Paul Menard	Aaron's 499	Talladega Superspeedway, Talladega	May 4
11	Kevin Harvick	5-hour Energy 400	Kansas Speedway, Kansas City	May 10
		NASCAR Sprint All-Star Race	Charlotte Motor Speedway, Concord	May 17
12	Jimmie Johnson	Coca-Cola 600	Charlotte Motor Speedway, Concord	May 25
13	Jimmie Johnson	FedEx 400	Dover International Speedway, Dover	June 1
14	Brad Keselowski	Pocono 400	Pocono Raceway, Long Pond	June 8
15	Kevin Harvick	Quicken Loans 400	Michigan International Speedway, Brooklyn	June 15
16	Jamie McMurray	Toyota/Save Mart 350	Sonoma Raceway, Sonoma	June 22
17	Brad Keselowski	Quaker State 400	Kentucky Speedway, Sparta	June 28
18	Michael McDowell	Coke Zero 400	Daytona International Speedway, Daytona Beach	July 6
19	Brad Keselowski	Camping World RV Sales 301	New Hampshire Motor Speedway, Loudon	July 13
20	Kasey Kahne	Crown Royal 400	Indianapolis Motor Speedway, Speedway	July 27
21	Joey Logano	Gobowling.com 400	Pocono Raceway, Long Pond	August 3
22	Marcos Ambrose	Cheez-It 355 at The Glen	Watkins Glen International, Watkins Glen	August 10
23	Joey Logano	Pure Michigan 400	Michigan International Speedway, Brooklyn	August 17
24	Kevin Harvick	Irwin Tools Night Race	Bristol Motor Speedway, Bristol	August 23
25	Kevin Harvick	AdvoCare 500	Atlanta Motor Speedway, Hampton	August 31
26	Brad Keselowski	Federated Auto Parts 400	Richmond International Raceway, Richmond	September 6
Chase for the Sprint Cup
27	Jeff Gordon	MyAFibStory.com 400	Chicagoland Speedway, Joliet	September 14
28	Joey Logano	Osram Sylvania 300	New Hampshire Motor Speedway, Loudon	September 21
29	Brad Keselowski	AAA 400	Dover International Speedway, Dover	September 28
30	Kevin Harvick	Hollywood Casino 400	Kansas Speedway, Kansas City	October 5
31	Kevin Harvick	Bank of America 500	Charlotte Motor Speedway, Concord	October 11
32	Austin Dillon	Talladega 500	Talladega Superspeedway, Talladega	October 19
33	Joey Logano	Goody's Headache Relief Shot 500	Martinsville Speedway, Ridgeway	October 26
34	Jimmie Johnson	AAA Texas 500	Texas Motor Speedway, Fort Worth	November 2
35	Kevin Harvick	Quicken Loans Race for Heroes 500	Phoenix International Raceway, Avondale	November 9
36	Kevin Harvick	Ford EcoBoost 400	Homestead-Miami Speedway, Homestead	November 16

=== Total Award Wins by Driver ===
Winner	Wins
Kevin Harvick	10
Brad Keselowski	7
Jimmie Johnson	6
Joel Logano	4
Marcos Ambrose	1
Austin Dillon	1
Jeff Gordon	1
Kasey Kahne	1
Matt Kenseth	1
Michael McDowell	1
Jamie McMurray	1
Paul Menard	1
Ricky Stenhouse Jr.	1

== 2015 season ==
=== Individual race award winners ===
No.	Winner	Race Title	Track	Date
		Sprint Unlimited	Daytona International Speedway, Daytona Beach	February 14
		Budweiser Duels	Daytona International Speedway, Daytona Beach	February 19
1	Sam Hornish Jr.	Daytona 500	Daytona International Speedway, Daytona Beach	February 22
2	Joey Logano	Folds of Honor QuikTrip 500	Atlanta Motor Speedway, Hampton	March 1
3	Kevin Harvick	Kobalt 400	Las Vegas Motor Speedway, Las Vegas	March 8
4	Kevin Harvick	CampingWorld.com 500	Phoenix International Raceway, Avondale	March 15
5	Kurt Busch	Auto Club 400	Auto Club Speedway, Fontana	March 22
6	Kevin Harvick	STP 500	Martinsville Speedway, Ridgeway	March 29
7	Kevin Harvick	Duck Commander 500	Texas Motor Speedway, Fort Worth	April 11
8	Matt Kenseth	Food City 500 In Support Of Steve Byrnes And Stand Up To Cancer	Bristol Motor Speedway, Bristol	April 19
9	Kurt Busch	Toyota Owners 400	Richmond International Raceway, Richmond	April 26
10	Ricky Stenhouse Jr.	GEICO 500	Talladega Superspeedway, Lincoln	May 3
11	Kevin Harvick	SpongeBob SquarePants 400	Kansas Speedway, Kansas City	May 9
		Sprint Showdown	Charlotte Motor Speedway, Concord	May 15
		NASCAR Sprint All-Star Race	Charlotte Motor Speedway, Concord	May 16
12	Martin Truex Jr.	Coca-Cola 600	Charlotte Motor Speedway, Concord	May 24
13	Martin Truex Jr.	Fedex 400 Benefiting Autism Speaks	Dover International Speedway, Dover	May 31
14	Martin Truex Jr.	Axalta "We Paint Winners" 400	Pocono Raceway, Long Pond	June 7
15	Carl Edwards	Quicken Loans 400	Michigan International Speedway, Brooklyn	June 14
16	Kyle Busch	Toyota/Save Mart 350	Sonoma Raceway, Sonoma	June 28
17	Carl Edwards	Coke Zero 400 Powered by Coca-Cola	Daytona International Speedway, Daytona Beach	July 5
18	Kyle Busch	Quaker State 400	Kentucky Speedway, Sparta	July 11
19	Kyle Busch	5-hour Energy 301	New Hampshire Motor Speedway, Loudon	July 19
20	Joey Logano	Crown Royal Presents the Jeff Kyle 400 at the Brickyard	Indianapolis Motor Speedway, Speedway	July 26
21	Joey Logano	Windows 10 400	Pocono Raceway, Long Pond	August 2
22	Brad Keselowski	Cheez-It 355	Watkins Glen International, Watkins Glen	August 9
23	Matt Kenseth	Pure Michigan 400	Michigan International Speedway, Brooklyn	August 16
24	Joey Logano	Irwin Tools Night Race	Bristol Motor Speedway, Bristol	August 22
25	Brad Keselowski	Bojangles' Southern 500	Darlington Raceway, Darlington	September 6
26	Matt Kenseth	Federated Auto Parts 400	Richmond International Raceway, Richmond	September 12
Chase for the Sprint Cup
Challenger Round
27	Kyle Busch	MyAFibRisk.com 400	Chicagoland Speedway, Joliet	September 20
28	Brad Keselowski	Sylvania 300	New Hampshire Motor Speedway, Loudon	September 27
29	Kevin Harvick	AAA 400	Dover International Speedway, Dover	October 4
Contender Round
30	Joey Logano	Bank of America 500	Charlotte Motor Speedway, Concord	October 10
31	Joey Logano	Hollywood Casino 400	Kansas Speedway, Kansas City	October 18
32	Aric Almirola	CampingWorld.com 500 at Talladega	Talladega Superspeedway, Lincoln	October 25
Eliminator Round
33	Jeff Gordon	Goody's Headache Relief Shot 500	Martinsville Speedway, Ridgeway	November 1
34	Brad Keselowski	AAA Texas 500	Texas Motor Speedway, Fort Worth	November 8
35	Dale Earnhardt Jr.	Quicken Loans Race for Heroes 500	Phoenix International Raceway, Avondale	November 15
Championship
36	Kyle Busch	Ford EcoBoost 400	Homestead-Miami Speedway, Homestead	November 22

=== Total Award Wins by Driver ===
Winner	Wins
Kevin Harvick	6
Joey Logano	6
Kyle Busch	5
Brad Keselowski	4
Matt Kenseth	3
Martin Truex Jr.	3
Kurt Busch	2
Carl Edwards	2
Aric Almirola	1
Dale Earnhardt Jr.	1
Jeff Gordon	1
Sam Hornish Jr.	1
Ricky Stenhouse Jr.	1

== 2016 season ==
=== Individual race award winners ===
No.	Winner	Race Title	Track	Date
		Sprint Unlimited	Daytona International Speedway, Daytona Beach	February 13
		Can-Am Duel	Daytona International Speedway, Daytona Beach	February 18
1	Paul Menard	Daytona 500	Daytona International Speedway, Daytona Beach	February 21
2	Kevin Harvick	Folds of Honor QuikTrip 500	Atlanta Motor Speedway, Hampton	February 28
3	Jimmie Johnson	Kobalt 400	Las Vegas Motor Speedway, Las Vegas	March 6
4	Carl Edwards	Good Sam 500	Phoenix International Raceway, Avondale	March 13
5	Kevin Harvick	Auto Club 400	Auto Club Speedway, Fontana	March 20
6	Kyle Busch	STP 500	Martinsville Speedway, Ridgeway	April 3
7	Martin Truex Jr.	Duck Commander 500	Texas Motor Speedway, Fort Worth	April 9
8	Carl Edwards	Food City 500	Bristol Motor Speedway, Bristol	April 17
9	Kyle Busch	Toyota Owners 400	Richmond International Raceway, Richmond	April 24
10	Landon Cassill	GEICO 500	Talladega Superspeedway, Lincoln	May 1
11	Martin Truex Jr.	GoBowling.com 400	Kansas Speedway, Kansas City	May 7
12	Kyle Larson	AAA 400 Drive for Autism	Dover International Speedway, Dover	May 15
		Sprint Showdown	Charlotte Motor Speedway, Concord	May 20
		NASCAR Sprint All-Star Race	Charlotte Motor Speedway, Concord	May 21
13	Martin Truex Jr.	Coca-Cola 600	Charlotte Motor Speedway, Concord	May 29
14	Chase Elliott	Axalta "We Paint Winners" 400	Pocono Raceway, Long Pond	June 5
15	Brad Keselowski	FireKeepers Casino 400	Michigan International Speedway, Brooklyn	June 12
16	Denny Hamlin	Toyota/Save Mart 350	Sonoma Raceway, Sonoma	June 26
17	Regan Smith	Coke Zero 400	Daytona International Speedway, Daytona Beach	July 2
18	Kevin Harvick	Quaker State 400	Kentucky Speedway, Sparta	July 9
19	Kyle Busch	New Hampshire 301	New Hampshire Motor Speedway, Loudon	July 17
20	Kyle Busch	Crown Royal presents the Combat Wounded Coalition 400 at the Brickyard	Indianapolis Motor Speedway, Speedway	July 24
21	Joey Logano	Pennsylvania 400	Pocono Raceway, Long Pond	July 31
22	Brad Keselowski	Cheez-It 355 at The Glen	Watkins Glen International, Watkins Glen	August 7
23	Kyle Busch	Bass Pro Shops NRA Night Race	Bristol Motor Speedway, Bristol	August 20
24	Kevin Harvick	Pure Michigan 400	Michigan International Speedway, Brooklyn	August 28
25	Kevin Harvick	Bojangles' Southern 500	Darlington Raceway, Darlington	September 4
26	Denny Hamlin	Federated Auto Parts 400	Richmond International Raceway, Richmond	September 10
Chase for the Sprint Cup
Round of 16
27	Jimmie Johnson	Chicagoland 400	Chicagoland Speedway, Joliet	September 18
28	Martin Truex Jr.	New England 300	New Hampshire Motor Speedway, Loudon	September 25
29	Martin Truex Jr.	Dover 400	Dover International Speedway, Dover	October 2
Round of 12
30	Alex Bowman	Bank of America 500	Charlotte Motor Speedway, Concord	October 8
31	Kevin Harvick	Hollywood Casino 400	Kansas Speedway, Kansas City	October 16
32	Danica Patrick	Hellmann's 500	Talladega Superspeedway, Lincoln	October 23
Round of 8
33	Martin Truex Jr.	Goody's Fast Relief 500	Martinsville Speedway, Ridgeway	October 30
34	Carl Edwards	AAA Texas 500	Texas Motor Speedway, Fort Worth	November 6
35	Joey Logano	Can-Am 500	Phoenix International Raceway, Avondale	November 13
Championship 4
36	Kevin Harvick	Ford EcoBoost 400	Homestead-Miami Speedway, Homestead	November 20

=== Total Award Wins by Driver ===
Winner	Wins
Kevin Harvick	7
Martin Truex Jr.	6
Kyle Busch	5
Carl Edwards	3
Denny Hamlin	2
Jimmie Johnson	2
Brad Keselowski	2
Joey Logano	2
Alex Bowman	1
Landon Cassill	1
Chase Elliott	1
Kyle Larson	1
Paul Menard	1
Danica Patrick	1
Regan Smith	1

== 2017 season ==
=== Individual race award winners ===
No.	Winner	Race Title	Track	Date
		Advance Auto Parts Clash	Daytona International Speedway, Daytona Beach, Florida	February 19^{1}
		Can-Am Duel	Daytona International Speedway, Daytona Beach, Florida	February 23
1	Martin Truex Jr.	Daytona 500	Daytona International Speedway, Daytona Beach, Florida	February 26
2	Kevin Harvick	Folds of Honor QuikTrip 500	Atlanta Motor Speedway, Hampton, Georgia	March 5
3	Martin Truex Jr.	Kobalt 400	Las Vegas Motor Speedway, Las Vegas, Nevada	March 12
4	Kyle Larson	Camping World 500	Phoenix International Raceway, Avondale, Arizona	March 19
5	Kyle Larson	Auto Club 400	Auto Club Speedway, Fontana, California	March 26
6	Kyle Busch	STP 500	Martinsville Speedway, Ridgeway, Virginia	April 2
7	Kevin Harvick	O'Reilly Auto Parts 500	Texas Motor Speedway, Fort Worth, Texas	April 9
8	Kyle Larson	Food City 500	Bristol Motor Speedway, Bristol, Tennessee	April 23
9	Matt Kenseth	Toyota Owners 400	Richmond International Raceway, Richmond, Virginia	April 30
10	Kyle Larson	GEICO 500	Talladega Superspeedway, Lincoln, Alabama	May 7
11	Ryan Blaney	Go Bowling 400	Kansas Speedway, Kansas City, Kansas	May 13
		The Showdown	Charlotte Motor Speedway, Concord, North Carolina	May 19
		Monster Energy NASCAR All-Star Race	Charlotte Motor Speedway, Concord, North Carolina	May 20
12	Martin Truex Jr.	Coca-Cola 600	Charlotte Motor Speedway, Concord, North Carolina	May 28
13	Kyle Larson	AAA 400 Drive for Autism	Dover International Speedway, Dover, Delaware	June 4
14	Kyle Busch	Pocono 400	Pocono Raceway, Long Pond, Pennsylvania	June 11
15	Kyle Larson	FireKeepers Casino 400	Michigan International Speedway, Brooklyn, Michigan	June 18
16	Jamie McMurray	Toyota/Save Mart 350	Sonoma Raceway, Sonoma, California	June 25
17	Brendan Gaughan	Coke Zero 400	Daytona International Speedway, Daytona Beach, Florida	July 1
18	Kyle Busch	Quaker State 400	Kentucky Speedway, Sparta, Kentucky	July 8
19	Kyle Busch	Overton 301	New Hampshire Motor Speedway, Loudon, New Hampshire	July 16
20	Kevin Harvick	Brickyard 400	Indianapolis Motor Speedway, Speedway, Indiana	July 23
21	Kyle Busch	Pennsylvania 400	Pocono Raceway, Long Pond, Pennsylvania	July 30
22	Martin Truex Jr.	Watkins Glen 355	Watkins Glen International, Watkins Glen, New York	August 6
23	Martin Truex Jr.	Pure Michigan 400	Michigan International Speedway, Brooklyn, Michigan	August 13
24	Kyle Busch	Bass Pro Shops NRA Night Race	Bristol Motor Speedway, Bristol, Tennessee	August 19
25	Martin Truex Jr.	Bojangles' Southern 500	Darlington Raceway, Darlington, South Carolina	September 3
26	Kyle Larson	Federated Auto Parts 400	Richmond International Raceway, Richmond, Virginia	September 9
Cup Championship Playoffs
Round of 16
27	Kevin Harvick	Tale of the Turtles 400	Chicagoland Speedway, Joliet, Illinois	September 17
28	Kyle Busch	ISM Connect 300	New Hampshire Motor Speedway, Loudon, New Hampshire	September 24
29	Martin Truex Jr.	Apache Warrior 400 Presented by Lucas Oil	Dover International Speedway, Dover, Delaware	October 1
Round of 12
30	Kevin Harvick	Bank of America 500	Charlotte Motor Speedway, Concord, North Carolina	October 7
31	Gray Gaulding	Alabama 500	Talladega Superspeedway, Lincoln, Alabama	October 15
32	Kyle Busch	Hollywood Casino 400	Kansas Speedway, Kansas City, Kansas	October 22
Round of 8
33	Kyle Busch	First Data 500	Martinsville Speedway, Ridgeway, Virginia	October 29
34	Martin Truex Jr.	AAA Texas 500	Texas Motor Speedway, Fort Worth, Texas	November 5
35	Matt Kenseth	Can-Am 500	Phoenix International Raceway, Avondale, Arizona	November 12
Championship 4
36	Martin Truex Jr.	Ford EcoBoost 400	Homestead-Miami Speedway, Homestead, Florida	November 19

=== Total Award Wins by Driver ===
Winner	Wins
Martin Truex Jr.	9
Kyle Busch	9
Kyle Larson	7
Kevin Harvick	5
Matt Kenseth	2
Ryan Blaney	1
Brendan Gaughan	1
Gary Gaulding	1
Jamie McMurray	1

== 2018 season ==
=== Individual race award winners ===
No.	Winner	Race Title	Track	Date
		Advance Auto Parts Clash	Daytona International Speedway, Daytona Beach, Florida	February 11
		Can-Am Duel	Daytona International Speedway, Daytona Beach, Florida	February 15
1	Joey Logano	Daytona 500	Daytona International Speedway, Daytona Beach, Florida	February 18
2	Brad Keselowski	Folds of Honor QuikTrip 500	Atlanta Motor Speedway, Hampton, Georgia	February 25
3	Kevin Harvick	Pennzoil 400	Las Vegas Motor Speedway, Las Vegas, Nevada	March 4
4	Kyle Busch	TicketGuardian 500	ISM Raceway, Avondale, Arizona	March 11
5	Martin Truex Jr.	Auto Club 400	Auto Club Speedway, Fontana, California	March 18
6	Kyle Busch	STP 500	Martinsville Speedway, Ridgeway, Virginia	March 26
7	Kyle Busch	O'Reilly Auto Parts 500	Texas Motor Speedway, Fort Worth, Texas	April 8
8	Kyle Larson	Food City 500	Bristol Motor Speedway, Bristol, Tennessee	April 15
9	Martin Truex Jr.	Toyota Owners 400	Richmond Raceway, Richmond, Virginia	April 21
10	Chase Elliott	GEICO 500	Talladega Superspeedway, Lincoln, Alabama	April 29
11	Kevin Harvick	AAA 400 Drive for Autism	Dover International Speedway, Dover, Delaware	May 6
12	Kevin Harvick	Kansas 400	Kansas Speedway, Kansas City, Kansas	May 12
		Monster Energy Open	Charlotte Motor Speedway, Concord, North Carolina	May 19
		Monster Energy NASCAR All-Star Race	Charlotte Motor Speedway, Concord, North Carolina	May 19
13	Kyle Busch	Coca-Cola 600	Charlotte Motor Speedway, Concord, North Carolina	May 27
14	Kevin Harvick	Pocono 400	Pocono Raceway, Long Pond, Pennsylvania	June 3
15	Kevin Harvick	FireKeepers Casino 400	Michigan International Speedway, Brooklyn, Michigan	June 10
16	Martin Truex Jr.	Toyota/Save Mart 350	Sonoma Raceway, Sonoma, California	June 24
17	Kevin Harvick	Overton's 400	Chicagoland Speedway, Joliet, Illinois	July 1
18	Erik Jones	Coke Zero 400 powered by Coca-Cola	Daytona International Speedway, Daytona Beach, Florida	July 7
19	Martin Truex Jr.	Quaker State 400 presented by Advance Auto Parts	Kentucky Speedway, Sparta, Kentucky	July 14
20	Martin Truex Jr.	New Hampshire 301	New Hampshire Motor Speedway, Loudon, New Hampshire	July 22
21	Kyle Busch	Gander Outdoors 400	Pocono Raceway, Long Pond, Pennsylvania	July 29
22	Chase Elliott	Go Bowling at The Glen	Watkins Glen International, Watkins Glen, New York	August 5
23	Kevin Harvick	Consumers Energy 400	Michigan International Speedway, Brooklyn, Michigan	August 12
24	Kyle Larson	Bass Pro Shops NRA Night Race	Bristol Motor Speedway, Bristol, Tennessee	August 18
25	Kyle Larson	Bojangles' Southern 500	Darlington Raceway, Darlington, South Carolina	September 2
26	Clint Bowyer	Big Machine Vodka 400 at the Brickyard	Indianapolis Motor Speedway, Speedway, Indiana	September 9
Round of 16
27	Brad Keselowski	South Point 400	Las Vegas Motor Speedway, Las Vegas, Nevada	September 16
28	Kevin Harvick	Federated Auto Parts 400	Richmond Raceway, Richmond, Virginia	September 22
29	Kyle Larson	Bank of America Roval 400	Charlotte Motor Speedway, Concord, North Carolina	September 30
Round of 12
30	Kevin Harvick	Gander Outdoors 400 (Dover)	Dover International Speedway, Dover, Delaware	October 7
31	Ricky Stenhouse Jr.	1000Bulbs.com 500	Talladega Superspeedway, Lincoln, Alabama	October 14
32	Ryan Blaney	Hollywood Casino 400	Kansas Speedway, Kansas City, Kansas	October 21
Round of 8
33	Joey Logano	First Data 500	Martinsville Speedway, Ridgeway, Virginia	October 28
34	Kevin Harvick	AAA Texas 500	Texas Motor Speedway, Fort Worth, Texas	November 4
35	Kyle Busch	Can-Am 500	ISM Raceway, Avondale, Arizona	November 11
Championship 4
36	Joey Logano	Ford EcoBoost 400	Homestead-Miami Speedway, Homestead, Florida	November 18

=== Total Award Wins by Driver ===
Winner	Wins
Kevin Harvick	10
Kyle Busch	6
Martin Truex Jr.	5
Kyle Larson	4
Joey Logano	3
Chase Elliott	2
Brad Keselowski	2
Ryan Blaney	1
Clint Bowyer	1
Erik Jones	1
Ricky Stenhouse Jr.	1

== 2019 season ==
=== Individual race award winners ===
No.	Winner	Race Title	Track	Date
		Advance Auto Parts Clash	Daytona International Speedway, Daytona Beach, Florida	February 10
		Gander RV Duel	Daytona International Speedway, Daytona Beach, Florida	February 14
1	Jimmie Johnson	Daytona 500	Daytona International Speedway, Daytona Beach, Florida	February 17
2	Martin Truex Jr.	Folds of Honor QuikTrip 500	Atlanta Motor Speedway, Hampton, Georgia	February 24
3	Kevin Harvick	Pennzoil 400 presented by Jiffy Lube	Las Vegas Motor Speedway, Las Vegas, Nevada	March 3
4	Kyle Busch	TicketGuardian 500	ISM Raceway, Avondale, Arizona	March 10
5	Kyle Busch	Auto Club 400	Auto Club Speedway, Fontana, California	March 17
6	Brad Keselowski	STP 500	Martinsville Speedway, Ridgeway, Virginia	March 24
7	William Byron	O'Reilly Auto Parts 500	Texas Motor Speedway, Fort Worth, Texas	March 31
8	Joey Logano	Food City 500	Bristol Motor Speedway, Bristol, Tennessee	April 7
9	Joey Logano	Toyota Owners 400	Richmond Raceway, Richmond, Virginia	April 13
10	Martin Truex Jr.	GEICO 500	Talladega Superspeedway, Lincoln, Alabama	April 28
11	Martin Truex Jr.	MENCS Race at Dover	Dover International Speedway, Dover, Delaware	May 5
12	Alex Bowman	MENCS Race at Kansas	Kansas Speedway, Kansas City, Kansas	May 11
		Monster Energy Open	Charlotte Motor Speedway, Concord, North Carolina	May 18
		Monster Energy NASCAR All-Star Race	Charlotte Motor Speedway, Concord, North Carolina	May 18
13	Kyle Busch	Coca-Cola 600	Charlotte Motor Speedway, Concord, North Carolina	May 26
14	Brad Keselowski	Pocono 400	Pocono Raceway, Long Pond, Pennsylvania	June 2
15	Kurt Busch	FireKeepers Casino 400	Michigan International Speedway, Brooklyn, Michigan	June 9
16	Denny Hamlin	Toyota/Save Mart 350	Sonoma Raceway, Sonoma, California	June 23
17	Kevin Harvick	Camping World 400	Chicagoland Speedway, Joliet, Illinois	June 30
18	Paul Menard	Coke Zero Sugar 400	Daytona International Speedway, Daytona Beach, Florida	July 6
19	Aric Almirola	Quaker State 400 presented by Walmart	Kentucky Speedway, Sparta, Kentucky	July 13
20	Kyle Busch	Foxwoods Resort Casino 301	New Hampshire Motor Speedway, Loudon, New Hampshire	July 21
21	Denny Hamlin	Gander Outdoors 400	Pocono Raceway, Long Pond, Pennsylvania	July 28
22	Martin Truex Jr.	Go Bowling at The Glen	Watkins Glen International, Watkins Glen, New York	August 4
23	Brad Keselowski	Consumers Energy 400	Michigan International Speedway, Brooklyn, Michigan	August 11
24	Kyle Larson	Bass Pro Shops NRA Night Race	Bristol Motor Speedway, Bristol, Tennessee	August 17
25	Kurt Busch	Bojangles' Southern 500	Darlington Raceway, Darlington, South Carolina	September 1
26	Chase Elliott	Big Machine Vodka 400 at the Brickyard	Indianapolis Motor Speedway, Speedway, Indiana	September 8
Round of 16
27	Martin Truex Jr.	South Point 400	Las Vegas Motor Speedway, Las Vegas, Nevada	September 15
28	Martin Truex Jr.	Federated Auto Parts 400	Richmond Raceway, Richmond, Virginia	September 21
29	Chase Elliott	Bank of America Roval 400	Charlotte Motor Speedway, Concord, North Carolina, (Roval)	September 29
Round of 12
30	Martin Truex Jr.	MENCS Race at Dover	Dover International Speedway, Dover, Delaware	October 6
31	Kevin Harvick	1000Bulbs.com 500	Talladega Superspeedway, Lincoln, Alabama	October 13
32	Denny Hamlin	Hollywood Casino 400	Kansas Speedway, Kansas City, Kansas	October 20
Round of 8
33	Martin Truex Jr.	First Data 500	Martinsville Speedway, Ridgeway, Virginia	October 27
34	Aric Almirola	AAA Texas 500	Texas Motor Speedway, Fort Worth, Texas	November 3
35	Kyle Busch	Bluegreen Vacations 500	ISM Raceway, Avondale, Arizona	November 10
Championship 4
36	Kyle Busch	Ford EcoBoost 400	Homestead–Miami Speedway, Homestead, Florida	November 17

=== Total Award Wins by Driver ===
Winner	Wins
Martin Truex Jr.	8
Kyle Busch	6
Kevin Harvick	3
Brad Keselowski	3
Denny Hamlin	3
Aric Almirola	2
Chase Elliott	2
Joey Logano	2
Kurt Busch	2
Jimmie Johnson	1
William Byron	1
Alex Bowman	1
Paul Menard	1
Kyle Larson	1

== 2020 season ==
=== Individual race award winners ===
No.	Winner	Race Title	Track	Date
		Busch Clash	Daytona International Speedway, Daytona Beach, Florida	February 9
		Bluegreen Vacations Duel	Daytona International Speedway, Daytona Beach, Florida	February 13
1	Chris Buescher	Daytona 500	Daytona International Speedway, Daytona Beach, Florida	February 16; February 17 (Note: The Daytona 500 was stopped at Lap 21 on Sunday, due to rain. The race was completed the following day.)
2	Ryan Blaney	Pennzoil 400	Las Vegas Motor Speedway, Las Vegas, Nevada	February 23
3	Alex Bowman	Auto Club 400	Auto Club Speedway, Fontana, California	March 1
4	Kevin Harvick	FanShield 500	Phoenix Raceway, Avondale, Arizona	March 8
5	Kevin Harvick	The Real Heroes 400 (Note: The Real Heroes 400 replaced the June Chicagoland race, the Camping World 400.)	Darlington Raceway, Darlington, South Carolina	May 17
6	Clint Bowyer	Toyota 500 (Note: The Toyota 500 replaced the spring April Richmond race, the Toyota Owners 400.)	Darlington Raceway, Darlington, South Carolina	May 20
7	Martin Truex Jr.	Coca-Cola 600	Charlotte Motor Speedway, Concord, North Carolina	May 24
8	Ryan Blaney	Alsco Uniforms 500 (Note: The Alsco Uniforms 500 replaced the June Sonoma race, the Toyota/Save Mart 350.)	Charlotte Motor Speedway, Concord, North Carolina	May 28
9	Jimmie Johnson	Food City presents the Supermarket Heroes 500	Bristol Motor Speedway, Bristol, Tennessee	May 31
10	Martin Truex Jr.	Folds of Honor QuikTrip 500	Atlanta Motor Speedway, Hampton, Georgia	June 7
11	Joey Logano	Blue-Emu Maximum Pain Relief 500	Martinsville Speedway, Ridgeway, Virginia	June 10
12	Denny Hamlin	Dixie Vodka 400	Homestead–Miami Speedway, Homestead, Florida	June 14
13	Denny Hamlin	GEICO 500	Talladega Superspeedway, Lincoln, Alabama	June 22 (Note: The GEICO 500 was delayed until Monday due to rain.)
14	Kyle Busch	Pocono Organics 325	Pocono Raceway, Long Pond, Pennsylvania	June 27
15	Kevin Harvick	Pocono 350	Pocono Raceway, Long Pond, Pennsylvania	June 28
16	Christopher Bell	Big Machine Hand Sanitizer 400 Powered by Big Machine Records	Indianapolis Motor Speedway, Speedway, Indiana	July 5
17	Kevin Harvick	Quaker State 400	Kentucky Speedway, Sparta, Kentucky	July 12
		NASCAR All Star Open	Bristol Motor Speedway, Bristol, Tennessee	July 15
		NASCAR All-Star Race	Bristol Motor Speedway, Bristol, Tennessee	July 15
18	Clint Bowyer	O'Reilly Auto Parts 500	Texas Motor Speedway, Fort Worth, Texas	July 19
19	Denny Hamlin	Super Start Batteries 400	Kansas Speedway, Kansas City, Kansas	July 23
20	Brad Keselowski	Foxwoods Resort Casino 301	New Hampshire Motor Speedway, Loudon, New Hampshire	August 2
21	Kevin Harvick	FireKeepers Casino 400 (Note: 400 mile races shortened to 500 kilometers.)	Michigan International Speedway, Brooklyn, Michigan	August 8
22	Kevin Harvick	Consumers Energy 400	Michigan International Speedway, Brooklyn, Michigan	August 9
23	Chase Elliott	Go Bowling 235 (Note: The Go Bowling 235 replaced the August Watkins Glen race, the Go Bowling at The Glen.)	Daytona International Speedway (Road Course), Daytona Beach, Florida	August 16
24	Denny Hamlin	Drydene 311	Dover International Speedway, Dover, Delaware	August 22
25	Kevin Harvick	Drydene 311	Dover International Speedway, Dover, Delaware	August 23
26	Michael McDowell	Coke Zero Sugar 400	Daytona International Speedway, Daytona Beach, Florida	August 29
NASCAR Cup Championship Playoffs
Round of 16
27	Kevin Harvick	Cook Out Southern 500	Darlington Raceway, Darlington, South Carolina	September 6
28	Austin Dillon	Federated Auto Parts 400	Richmond Raceway, Richmond, Virginia	September 12
29	Kevin Harvick	Bass Pro Shops NRA Night Race	Bristol Motor Speedway, Bristol, Tennessee	September 19
Round of 12
30	Denny Hamlin	South Point 400	Las Vegas Motor Speedway, Las Vegas, Nevada	September 27
31	Austin Dillon	YellaWood 500	Talladega Superspeedway, Lincoln, Alabama	October 4
32	Kurt Busch	Bank of America Roval 400	Charlotte Motor Speedway (Road Course), Concord, North Carolina	October 11
Round of 8
33	Kevin Harvick	Hollywood Casino 400	Kansas Speedway, Kansas City, Kansas	October 18
34	Martin Truex Jr.	Autotrader EchoPark Automotive 500	Texas Motor Speedway, Fort Worth, Texas	October 25
35	Chase Elliott	Xfinity 500	Martinsville Speedway, Ridgeway, Virginia	November 1
Championship 4
36	Chase Elliott	Bluegreen Vacations 500	Phoenix Raceway, Avondale, Arizona	November 8

=== Total Award Wins by Driver ===
Winner	Wins
Kevin Harvick	10
Denny Hamlin	5
Martin Truex Jr.	3
Chase Elliott	3
Ryan Blaney	2
Clint Bowyer	2
Austin Dillon	2
Chris Buescher	1
Alex Bowman	1
Jimmie Johnson	1
Joey Logano	1
Kyle Busch	1
Christopher Bell	1
Brad Keselowski	1
Michael McDowell	1
Kurt Busch	1

== 2021 season ==
=== Individual race award winners ===
No.	Winner	Race Title	Track	Date
		Busch Clash	Daytona International Speedway (Road Course), Daytona Beach, Florida	February 9
		Bluegreen Vacations Duel	Daytona International Speedway, Daytona Beach, Florida	February 11
1	Denny Hamlin	Daytona 500	Daytona International Speedway, Daytona Beach, Florida	February 14–15 (Note: Race started on Sunday, but finished on Monday at around midnight due to rain after 20 laps.)
2	Chase Elliott	O'Reilly Auto Parts 253	Daytona International Speedway (Road Course), Daytona Beach, Florida	February 21
3	William Byron	Dixie Vodka 400	Homestead–Miami Speedway, Homestead, Florida	February 28
4	Denny Hamlin	Pennzoil 400 presented by Jiffy Lube	Las Vegas Motor Speedway, Las Vegas, Nevada	March 7
5	Brad Keselowski	Instacart 500	Phoenix Raceway, Phoenix, Arizona	March 14
6	Kyle Larson	Folds of Honor QuikTrip 500	Atlanta Motor Speedway, Hampton, Georgia	March 21
7	Tyler Reddick	Food City Dirt Race	Bristol Motor Speedway (Dirt Course), Bristol, Tennessee	March 29 (Note: The Food City Dirt Race was supposed to be held on Sunday, March 28, but was postponed to Monday due to heavy rain and flooding. The heat qualifying races were also cancelled.)
8	Denny Hamlin	Blue-Emu Maximum Pain Relief 500	Martinsville Speedway, Ridgeway, Virginia	April 10–11 (Note: Race started on Saturday, but finished on Sunday due to rainfall after over 50 laps.)
9	Denny Hamlin	Toyota Owners 400	Richmond Raceway, Richmond, Virginia	April 18
10	Bubba Wallace	GEICO 500	Talladega Superspeedway, Lincoln, Alabama	April 25
11	Kyle Larson	Buschy McBusch Race 400	Kansas Speedway, Kansas City, Kansas	May 2
12	Ryan Blaney	Goodyear 400	Darlington Raceway, Darlington, South Carolina	May 9
13	Kyle Larson	Drydene 400	Dover International Speedway, Dover, Delaware	May 16
14	Chase Elliott	EchoPark Texas Grand Prix	Circuit of the Americas, Austin, Texas	May 23
15	Kyle Larson	Coca-Cola 600	Charlotte Motor Speedway, Concord, North Carolina	May 30
16	Kyle Larson	Toyota/Save Mart 350	Sonoma Raceway, Sonoma, California	June 6
		NASCAR All Star Open	Texas Motor Speedway, Fort Worth, Texas	June 13
		NASCAR All-Star Race	Texas Motor Speedway, Fort Worth, Texas	June 13
17	Kyle Larson	Ally 400	Nashville Superspeedway, Lebanon, Tennessee	June 20
18	Kyle Busch	Pocono Organics CBD 325	Pocono Raceway, Long Pond, Pennsylvania	June 26
19	Brad Keselowski	Explore the Pocono Mountains 350	Pocono Raceway, Long Pond, Pennsylvania	June 27
20	Tyler Reddick	Jockey Made in America 250	Road America, Elkhart Lake, Wisconsin	July 4
21	Kyle Busch	Quaker State 400	Atlanta Motor Speedway, Hampton, Georgia	July 11
22	Martin Truex Jr.	Foxwoods Resort Casino 301	New Hampshire Motor Speedway, Loudon, New Hampshire	July 18
23	Kyle Larson	Go Bowling at The Glen	Watkins Glen International, Watkins Glen, New York	August 8
24	Ryan Newman	Verizon 200 at the Brickyard	Indianapolis Motor Speedway (Road Course), Speedway, Indiana	August 15
25	Denny Hamlin	FireKeepers Casino 400	Michigan International Speedway, Brooklyn, Michigan	August 22
26	Tyler Reddick	Coke Zero Sugar 400	Daytona International Speedway, Daytona Beach, Florida	August 28
NASCAR Playoffs
Round of 16
27	Denny Hamlin	Cook Out Southern 500	Darlington Raceway, Darlington, South Carolina	September 5
28	Denny Hamlin	Federated Auto Parts 400	Richmond Raceway, Richmond, Virginia	September 11
29	Alex Bowman	Bass Pro Shops Night Race	Bristol Motor Speedway, Bristol, Tennessee	September 18
Round of 12
30	Denny Hamlin	South Point 400	Las Vegas Motor Speedway, Las Vegas, Nevada	September 26
31	Quin Houff	YellaWood 500	Talladega Superspeedway, Lincoln, Alabama	October 4 (Note: The YellaWood 500 was supposed to be held on Sunday, October 3, but was postponed to Monday due to rain.)
32	Kyle Larson	Bank of America Roval 400	Charlotte Motor Speedway (Roval), Concord, North Carolina	October 10
Round of 8
33	Erik Jones	Autotrader EchoPark Automotive 500	Texas Motor Speedway, Fort Worth, Texas	October 17
34	Kurt Busch	Hollywood Casino 400	Kansas Speedway, Kansas City, Kansas	October 24
35	Chase Elliott	Xfinity 500	Martinsville Speedway, Ridgeway, Virginia	October 31
Championship 4
36	Martin Truex Jr.	NASCAR Cup Series Championship Race	Phoenix Raceway, Phoenix, Arizona	November 7

=== Total Award Wins by Driver ===
Winner	Wins
Kyle Larson	8
Denny Hamlin	8
Tyler Reddick	3
Chase Elliott	3
Brad Keselowski	2
Kyle Busch	2
Martin Truex Jr.	2
William Byron	1
Bubba Wallace	1
Ryan Blaney	1
Ryan Newman	1
Alex Bowman	1
Quin Houff	1
Erik Jones	1
Kurt Busch	1

== 2022 season ==
=== Individual race award winners ===
No.	Winner	Race Title	Track	Date
		Busch Light Clash at The Coliseum	Los Angeles Memorial Coliseum, Los Angeles, California	February 6
		Bluegreen Vacations Duel	Daytona International Speedway, Daytona Beach, Florida	February 17
1	Corey LaJoie	**Daytona 500**	Daytona International Speedway, Daytona Beach, Florida	February 20
2	Erik Jones	WISE Power 400	Auto Club Speedway, Fontana, California	February 27
3	Kyle Larson	Pennzoil 400 presented by Jiffy Lube	Las Vegas Motor Speedway, Las Vegas, Nevada	March 6
4	Chase Elliott	Ruoff Mortgage 500	Phoenix Raceway, Phoenix, Arizona	March 13
5	Alex Bowman	Folds of Honor QuikTrip 500	Atlanta Motor Speedway, Hampton, Georgia	March 20
6	Ryan Blaney	EchoPark Texas Grand Prix	Circuit of the Americas, Austin, Texas	March 27
7	Martin Truex Jr.	Toyota Owners 400	Richmond Raceway, Richmond, Virginia	April 3
8	William Byron	Blue-Emu Maximum Pain Relief 400	Martinsville Speedway, Ridgeway, Virginia	April 9
9	Chase Briscoe	Food City Dirt Race	Bristol Motor Speedway (Dirt Course), Bristol, Tennessee	April 17
10	Alex Bowman	**GEICO 500**	Talladega Superspeedway, Lincoln, Alabama	April 24
11	Chase Elliott	DuraMAX Drydene 400 presented by RelaDyne	Dover Motor Speedway, Dover, Delaware	May 1–2
12	Joey Logano	Goodyear 400	Darlington Raceway, Darlington, South Carolina	May 8
13	Kurt Busch	AdventHealth 400	Kansas Speedway, Kansas City, Kansas	May 15
		NASCAR All Star Open	Texas Motor Speedway, Fort Worth, Texas	May 22
		NASCAR All-Star Race	Texas Motor Speedway, Fort Worth, Texas	May 22
14	Ross Chastain	**Coca-Cola 600**	Charlotte Motor Speedway, Concord, North Carolina	May 29
15	Kyle Busch	Enjoy Illinois 300 presented by TicketSmarter	World Wide Technology Raceway, Madison, Illinois	June 5
16	Daniel Suárez	Toyota/Save Mart 350	Sonoma Raceway, Sonoma, California	June 12
17	Denny Hamlin	Ally 400	Nashville Superspeedway, Lebanon, Tennessee	June 26
18	Chase Elliott	Kwik Trip 250 presented by Jockey Made in America	Road America, Elkhart Lake, Wisconsin	July 3
19	Christopher Bell	Quaker State 400 presented by Walmart	Atlanta Motor Speedway, Hampton, Georgia	July 10
20	Martin Truex Jr.	Ambetter 301	New Hampshire Motor Speedway, Loudon, New Hampshire	July 17
21	Erik Jones	M&M's Fan Appreciation 400	Pocono Raceway, Long Pond, Pennsylvania	July 24
22	Chris Buescher	Verizon 200 at the Brickyard	Indianapolis Motor Speedway (Road Course), Speedway, Indiana	July 31
23	Kyle Larson	FireKeepers Casino 400	Michigan International Speedway, Brooklyn, Michigan	August 7
24	Kevin Harvick	Federated Auto Parts 400	Richmond Raceway, Richmond, Virginia	August 14
25	Joey Logano	Go Bowling at The Glen	Watkins Glen International, Watkins Glen, New York	August 21
26	Tyler Reddick	Coke Zero Sugar 400	Daytona International Speedway, Daytona Beach, Florida	August 28
NASCAR Playoffs
Round of 16
27	Christopher Bell	**Cook Out Southern 500**	Darlington Raceway, Darlington, South Carolina	September 4
28	Christopher Bell	Hollywood Casino 400	Kansas Speedway, Kansas City, Kansas	September 11
29	Christopher Bell	Bass Pro Shops Night Race	Bristol Motor Speedway, Bristol, Tennessee	September 17
Round of 12
30	William Byron	Autotrader EchoPark Automotive 500	Texas Motor Speedway, Fort Worth, Texas	September 25
31	Noah Gragson	YellaWood 500	Talladega Superspeedway, Lincoln, Alabama	October 2
32	A. J. Allmendinger	Bank of America Roval 400	Charlotte Motor Speedway (Roval), Concord, North Carolina	October 9
Round of 8
33	Joey Logano	South Point 400	Las Vegas Motor Speedway, Las Vegas, Nevada	October 16
34	Kyle Larson	Dixie Vodka 400	Homestead–Miami Speedway, Homestead, Florida	October 23
35	Denny Hamlin	Xfinity 500	Martinsville Speedway, Ridgeway, Virginia	October 30
Championship 4
36	Chase Briscoe	NASCAR Cup Series Championship Race	Phoenix Raceway, Phoenix, Arizona	November 6

Bolded races indicate a NASCAR Major, also known as a Crown Jewel race.

=== Total Award Wins by Driver ===
Winner	Wins
Christopher Bell	4
Kyle Larson	3
Chase Elliott	3
Joey Logano	3
Alex Bowman	2
Martin Truex Jr.	2
Erik Jones	2
William Byron	2
Denny Hamlin	2
Chase Briscoe	2
Corey LaJoie	1
Ryan Blaney	1
Kurt Busch	1
Ross Chastain	1
Kyle Busch	1
Daniel Suárez	1
Chris Buescher	1
Kevin Harvick	1
Tyler Reddick	1
Noah Gragson	1
A. J. Allmendinger	1
