= Ferko v. NASCAR =

Ferko v. National Association of Stock Car Auto Racing

Ferko, et al. v. National Association for Stock Car Auto Racing, Inc., et al., commonly known as the Ferko lawsuit, was an American lawsuit between plaintiff Francis Ferko, a resident of Plano, Texas, and a minor shareholder of the then-publicly traded Speedway Motorsports, Inc. (SMI), and defendants NASCAR and International Speedway Corporation (ISC), which are both owned by the France family. Ferko filed a derivative suit that contended NASCAR and ISC violated an implied agreement with SMI to provide a second NEXTEL Cup race per racing season upon completion of Texas Motor Speedway, and violated antitrust laws by preventing SMI from obtaining one.

The suit was filed in February 2002 and was settled in May 2004. The settlement delivered the desired second Sprint Cup race each season to Texas Motor Speedway and resulted in numerous other changes to the NASCAR schedule of races and racing venues after a series of transactions between SMI and ISC.

== Settlement ==
Ferko was represented by The Cochran Firm, and filed the suit after SMI refused to take legal action against NASCAR and ISC regarding the alleged promise of a second date. SMI, while publicly approving of Ferko's actions, made no attempt to coordinate with him or aid him in the lawsuit. NASCAR publicly labeled Ferko a proxy for SMI, and unsuccessfully moved to have SMI named as the main plaintiff.

As the case was preparing to go to trial in 2004, the parties settled as part of a larger restructuring of NASCAR's schedule. In the settlement, ISC sold the North Carolina Speedway in Rockingham (now known as Rockingham Speedway) to SMI, with Rockingham removed from the NEXTEL Cup schedule, and its remaining (February) race moved to ISC's Auto Club Speedway in Fontana, California. Continuing with NASCAR's schedule realignment, Texas earned its promised second race (the reason for the lawsuit) when a November race, used for the prestigious Southern 500 (renamed the Dickies 500 in Texas), was moved to Texas from ISC's Darlington Raceway. As it happens, the November date had been inherited by Darlington from Rockingham only a year earlier, when Rockingham had been reduced from two Nextel Cup races to one and after the Southern 500 had been moved from its traditional Labor Day weekend date in favor of giving a second race weekend to Auto Club Speedway.

The November date gave Texas a race in the Chase for the Nextel Cup and cost Darlington the more prestigious of its two race dates, which resulted in the track lengthening its spring race to 500 miles and eventually giving it the Southern 500 name. For its part, SMI had to agree that Rockingham would be used only for non-competition NASCAR uses, such as for movie settings about the sport or for testing. As a result of a 2006 NASCAR testing rule change limiting testing on tracks used for NASCAR competition, testing at Rockingham become more commonplace (except when it was briefly used in the Truck Series in 2012 and 2013) until NASCAR completely banned all testing in 2015. SMI sold off the Rockingham track in 2007, and the track closed when its owner went bankrupt in 2015, until a new investor bought the track in 2018. Under Rockingham Properties management, the second-tier series and NASCAR Craftsman Truck Series returned to the track in 2025, with hopes of a Cup Series date in the future.

== Aftermath ==
After filing the suit, Ferko claimed he lost his job in food safety as a result of the suit's publicity, and he and his wife moved to Atlanta for his new job. Shortly after moving, their 20-year-old son Anthony, who remained in Texas to be with his own 6-month-old son, committed suicide. After Ferko and his wife failed to win custody of their grandson, they divorced. Following the settlement, SMI maintained its distance from Ferko to help repair its relationship with NASCAR, and in 2005, before the initial running of the Dickies 500, Ferko expressed his disappointment in SMI for not compensating him for his part in the lawsuit, and expressed regret at pursuing it.

As of 2022, the tracks involved in the schedule shuffling that took place as a result of the lawsuit had the following occurrences:

- Darlington received its second race date back following the 2020 season, after the track had hosted three Cup Series events during the COVID-affected season.
- Texas chose to give up its spring date in favor of hosting the NASCAR All-Star Race in 2021; the track hosted the race for two seasons before NASCAR moved it to North Wilkesboro Speedway for 2023.
- Auto Club Speedway's second date was moved from Labor Day weekend in 2009 in a swap with Texas' sister track, Atlanta, which gave the California track a race date in the Chase for the Cup. The race would be reduced to 400 miles in 2010, then was removed from the calendar altogether. Atlanta ran the Labor Day weekend race until the end of the 2014 season, when SMI chose to relocate its second event to Kentucky; the Labor Day weekend slot was returned to Darlington, and as of 2022 the Southern 500 is the first race of the current NASCAR Playoffs.

== Related litigation ==
In 2005, Kentucky Speedway filed a similar suit against NASCAR and ISC, requesting a NEXTEL Cup race at their venue. However, unlike the promise of a second race at the heart of the Ferko lawsuit, the France family had expressly told Kentucky Speedway that it would not be given a race, and so the case was filed on antitrust grounds only. The lawsuit was dismissed on January 7, 2008, although the track's owners appealed the dismissal. On May 22, 2008, Speedway Motorsports, Inc. announced it had purchased Kentucky Speedway from Kentucky Speedway, LLC and further litigation became moot as a result. The purchase was finalized on January 1, 2009. Bruton Smith, head of Speedway Motorsports Inc. who bought the racetrack, said he had plans to bring a Sprint Cup (as of 2021, NASCAR Cup Series) race to Kentucky Speedway. That came in 2011 when Kentucky Speedway gained a date at the expense of Atlanta Motor Speedway. This change was reversed in 2020, with Kentucky losing the Quaker State 400 back to Atlanta beginning in 2021.
