= 2017 Quaker State 400 =

Race details
- Race 18 of 36 in the 2017 Monster Energy NASCAR Cup Series
- Date: July 8, 2017
- Location: Kentucky Speedway in Sparta, Kentucky
- Course: Permanent racing facility
- Course length: 1.5 miles (2.414 km)
- Distance: 274 laps, 411 mi (661.440 km)
- Scheduled distance: 267 laps, 400.5 mi (644.542 km)
- Average speed: 138.604 miles per hour (223.062 km/h)

Pole position
Driver	Kyle Busch	Joe Gibbs Racing
- Time: 28.379

Most laps led
Driver	Martin Truex Jr.	Furniture Row Racing
- Laps: 152

Winner
No. 78	Martin Truex Jr.	Furniture Row Racing

Television in the United States
- Network: NBCSN
- Announcers: Rick Allen, Jeff Burton and Steve Letarte

Radio in the United States
- Radio: PRN
- Booth announcers: Doug Rice, Mark Garrow and Wendy Venturini
- Turn announcers: Rob Albright (1 & 2) and Pat Patterson (3 & 4)

The 2017 Quaker State 400 presented by Advance Auto Parts was a Monster Energy NASCAR Cup Series race held on July 8, 2017, at Kentucky Speedway in Sparta, Kentucky. Contested over 274 laps, extended from 267 laps due to overtime, on the 1.5-mile (2.4-kilometre) speedway, it was the 18th race of the 2017 Monster Energy NASCAR Cup Series season.

Furniture Row Racing's Martin Truex Jr. took his third victory of the season, winning both stages and leading the most laps (152) during the race.

== Entry list ==
No.	Driver	Team	Manufacturer
1	Jamie McMurray	Chip Ganassi Racing	Chevrolet
2	Brad Keselowski	Team Penske	Ford
3	Austin Dillon	Richard Childress Racing	Chevrolet
4	Kevin Harvick	Stewart–Haas Racing	Ford
5	Kasey Kahne	Hendrick Motorsports	Chevrolet
6	Trevor Bayne	Roush Fenway Racing	Ford
10	Danica Patrick	Stewart–Haas Racing	Ford
11	Denny Hamlin	Joe Gibbs Racing	Toyota
13	Ty Dillon (R)	Germain Racing	Chevrolet
14	Clint Bowyer	Stewart–Haas Racing	Ford
15	Reed Sorenson	Premium Motorsports	Chevrolet
17	Ricky Stenhouse Jr.	Roush Fenway Racing	Ford
18	Kyle Busch	Joe Gibbs Racing	Toyota
19	Daniel Suárez (R)	Joe Gibbs Racing	Toyota
20	Matt Kenseth	Joe Gibbs Racing	Toyota
21	Ryan Blaney	Wood Brothers Racing	Ford
22	Joey Logano	Team Penske	Ford
23	Joey Gase (i)	BK Racing	Toyota
24	Chase Elliott	Hendrick Motorsports	Chevrolet
27	Paul Menard	Richard Childress Racing	Chevrolet
31	Ryan Newman	Richard Childress Racing	Chevrolet
32	Matt DiBenedetto	Go Fas Racing	Ford
33	Jeffrey Earnhardt	Circle Sport – The Motorsports Group	Chevrolet
34	Landon Cassill	Front Row Motorsports	Ford
37	Chris Buescher	JTG Daugherty Racing	Chevrolet
38	David Ragan	Front Row Motorsports	Ford
41	Kurt Busch	Stewart–Haas Racing	Ford
42	Kyle Larson	Chip Ganassi Racing	Chevrolet
43	Bubba Wallace (i)	Richard Petty Motorsports	Ford
47	A. J. Allmendinger	JTG Daugherty Racing	Chevrolet
48	Jimmie Johnson	Hendrick Motorsports	Chevrolet
51	B. J. McLeod (i)	Rick Ware Racing	Chevrolet
55	Gray Gaulding (R)	Premium Motorsports	Toyota
66	Timmy Hill (i)	MBM Motorsports	Chevrolet
72	Cole Whitt	TriStar Motorsports	Chevrolet
77	Erik Jones (R)	Furniture Row Racing	Toyota
78	Martin Truex Jr.	Furniture Row Racing	Toyota
83	Ryan Sieg (i)	BK Racing	Toyota
88	Dale Earnhardt Jr.	Hendrick Motorsports	Chevrolet
95	Michael McDowell	Leavine Family Racing	Chevrolet
Official entry list

== Practice ==
=== First practice ===
Jamie McMurray was the fastest in the first practice session with a time of 28.911 seconds and a speed of 186.780 mph (300.593 km/h).

Pos	No.	Driver	Team	Manufacturer	Time	Speed
1	1	Jamie McMurray	Chip Ganassi Racing	Chevrolet	28.911	186.780
2	78	Martin Truex Jr.	Furniture Row Racing	Toyota	28.963	186.445
3	42	Kyle Larson	Chip Ganassi Racing	Chevrolet	29.017	186.098
Official first practice results

=== Final practice ===
Kyle Larson was the fastest in the final practice session with a time of 28.695 seconds and a speed of 188.186 mph (302.856 km/h).

Pos	No.	Driver	Team	Manufacturer	Time	Speed
1	42	Kyle Larson	Chip Ganassi Racing	Chevrolet	28.695	188.186
2	78	Martin Truex Jr.	Furniture Row Racing	Toyota	28.848	187.188
3	24	Chase Elliott	Hendrick Motorsports	Chevrolet	28.892	186.903
Official final practice results

== Qualifying ==
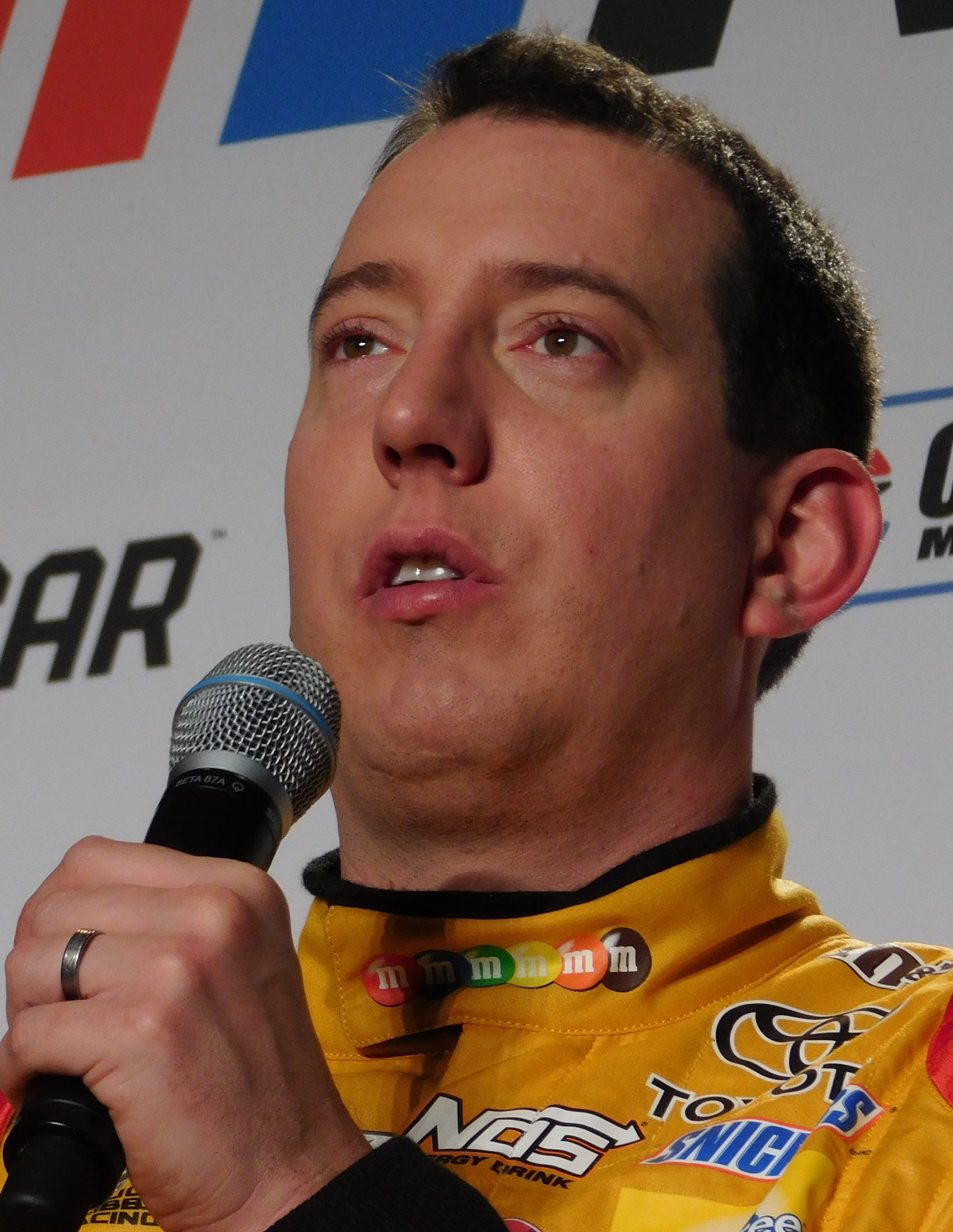
Kyle Busch scored the pole position.

Kyle Busch scored the pole for the race with a time of 28.379 and a speed of 190.282 mph (306.229 km/h) after only two rounds of qualifying were completed due to weather.

=== Qualifying results ===
Pos	No.	Driver	Team	Manufacturer	R1	R2
1	18	Kyle Busch	Joe Gibbs Racing	Toyota	28.736	28.379
2	78	Martin Truex Jr.	Furniture Row Racing	Toyota	28.675	28.392
3	20	Matt Kenseth	Joe Gibbs Racing	Toyota	28.567	28.460
4	1	Jamie McMurray	Chip Ganassi Racing	Chevrolet	28.729	28.464
5	11	Denny Hamlin	Joe Gibbs Racing	Toyota	28.626	28.468
6	21	Ryan Blaney	Wood Brothers Racing	Ford	28.641	28.487
7	4	Kevin Harvick	Stewart–Haas Racing	Ford	28.656	28.488
8	48	Jimmie Johnson	Hendrick Motorsports	Chevrolet	28.625	28.523
9	19	Daniel Suárez (R)	Joe Gibbs Racing	Toyota	28.770	28.528
10	2	Brad Keselowski	Team Penske	Ford	28.945	28.539
11	22	Joey Logano	Team Penske	Ford	28.625	28.555
12	24	Chase Elliott	Hendrick Motorsports	Chevrolet	28.506	28.595
13	88	Dale Earnhardt Jr.	Hendrick Motorsports	Chevrolet	28.772	28.606
14	77	Erik Jones (R)	Furniture Row Racing	Toyota	28.734	28.609
15	41	Kurt Busch	Stewart–Haas Racing	Ford	28.661	28.619
16	14	Clint Bowyer	Stewart–Haas Racing	Ford	29.010	28.634
17	43	Bubba Wallace (i)	Richard Petty Motorsports	Ford	28.829	28.656
18	17	Ricky Stenhouse Jr.	Roush Fenway Racing	Ford	28.690	28.676
19	6	Trevor Bayne	Roush Fenway Racing	Ford	28.711	28.676
20	10	Danica Patrick	Stewart–Haas Racing	Ford	28.986	28.797
21	95	Michael McDowell	Leavine Family Racing	Chevrolet	29.090	28.991
22	37	Chris Buescher	JTG Daugherty Racing	Chevrolet	28.959	29.002
23	5	Kasey Kahne	Hendrick Motorsports	Chevrolet	28.586	29.013
24	27	Paul Menard	Richard Childress Racing	Chevrolet	28.995	29.048
25	3	Austin Dillon	Richard Childress Racing	Chevrolet	29.101	—
26	38	David Ragan	Front Row Motorsports	Ford	29.129	—
27	13	Ty Dillon (R)	Germain Racing	Chevrolet	29.221	—
28	47	A. J. Allmendinger	JTG Daugherty Racing	Chevrolet	29.228	—
29	31	Ryan Newman	Richard Childress Racing	Chevrolet	29.247	—
30	32	Matt DiBenedetto	Go Fas Racing	Ford	29.367	—
31	83	Ryan Sieg (i)	BK Racing	Toyota	29.728	—
32	72	Cole Whitt	TriStar Motorsports	Chevrolet	29.790	—
33	15	Reed Sorenson	Premium Motorsports	Chevrolet	29.921	—
34	23	Joey Gase (i)	BK Racing	Toyota	30.063	—
35	34	Landon Cassill	Front Row Motorsports	Ford	30.193	—
36	33	Jeffrey Earnhardt	Circle Sport – The Motorsports Group	Chevrolet	30.338	—
37	51	B. J. McLeod (i)	Rick Ware Racing	Chevrolet	30.490	—
38	66	Timmy Hill (i)	MBM Motorsports	Chevrolet	30.544	—
39	55	Gray Gaulding (R)	Premium Motorsports	Toyota	30.603	—
40	42	Kyle Larson	Chip Ganassi Racing	Chevrolet	0.000	—
Official qualifying results

== Race ==
=== First stage ===
Kyle Busch led the field to the green flag at 7:49 p.m. He led the first 29 laps before Martin Truex Jr. edged him out at the line to take the lead on Lap 30. Busch took it back the following lap, just as caution #1, a scheduled competition caution due to rain, flew for the first time. It went back to green on Lap 36. Truex drove down and passed Busch on Lap 69, and drove on to win the first stage. Caution #2 flew moments after on Lap 81 for the conclusion of the stage. Under the caution, Denny Hamlin and Kyle Larson were sent to the tail-end of the field on the following restart for speeding on pit road.

=== Second stage ===
Busch retook the lead from Truex going into Turn 3 on the Lap 88 restart. Entering Turn 3 further back in the field on the same lap, Brad Keselowski got loose and spun out, collecting Clint Bowyer and Jimmie Johnson, who suffered critical damage to his right-front wheel well after contact with Keselowski. This brought out the third caution. Restarting on Lap 93, caution #4 flew two laps later when Kasey Kahne tried to force his way underneath Trevor Bayne, sending Bayne spinning and himself into the Turn 1 wall. Caution flew for the fifth time 12 laps after the Lap 100 restart when Bayne got loose and spun out exiting Turn 4.

The race settled into a longer green run after the Lap 117 restart, forcing Busch to navigate lapped traffic. Doing so allowed Truex to reel him in and retake the lead on Lap 136. Joey Gase brought out the sixth caution two laps later when he suffered a tire failure and slammed the wall in Turn 2. Truex took off when the race went back green on Lap 142 and won the second stage on Lap 161. Under the stage break caution, Joey Logano chose not to pit and assumed the race lead.

=== Final stage ===
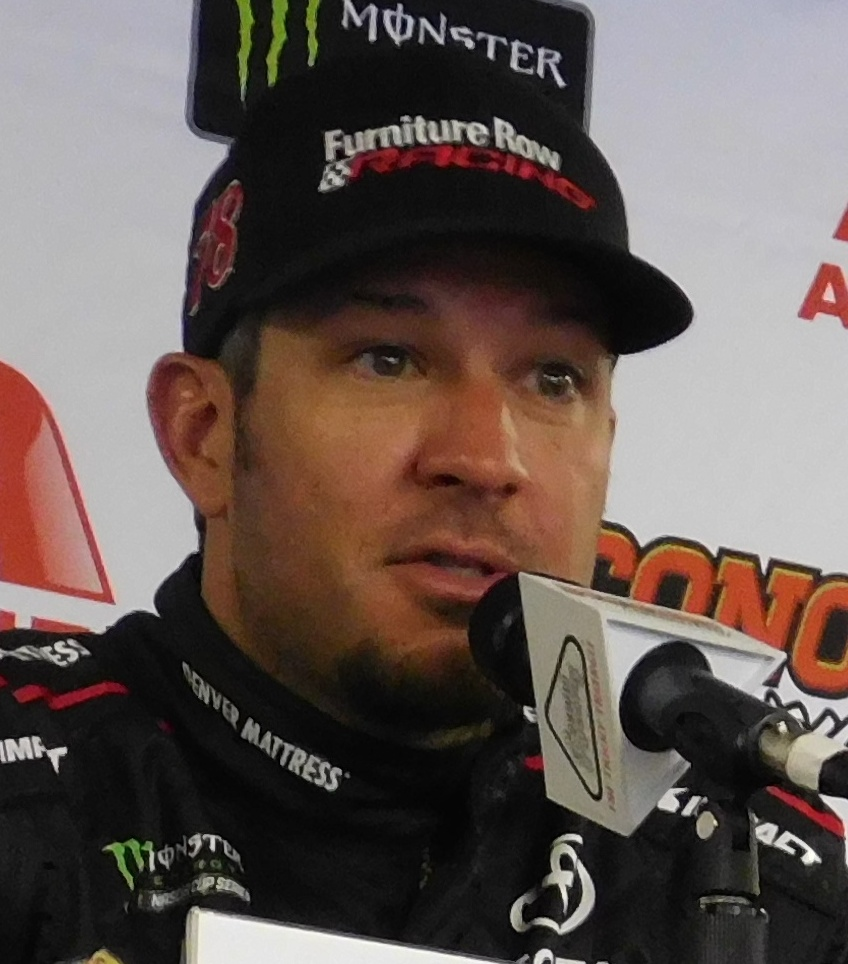
Martin Truex Jr. swept all three stages and won the race.

Four laps after the Lap 167 restart, Truex took back the lead and set sail from the field. Aside from the five laps Dale Earnhardt Jr. spent in the lead during a cycle of green flag stops, Truex had the race in check, with as much as a 16-second lead over the second-place car. Kurt Busch's engine gave up on the frontstretch and that brought out caution #7 with two laps to go, forcing an overtime finish. Truex opted to stay out, while Kyle Busch, Larson and the other five drivers on the lead lap hit pit road. The final restart had Truex restart on the outside line, with Busch to his inside with 2 fresh left side tires.

==== Overtime ====
Larson with 4 fresh tires gave a shove to Truex coming to the green, giving him the lead going into Turn 1. Coming to the white flag, Bubba Wallace drove Matt Kenseth up out of the racing groove, which got loose and spun out in front of Daniel Suárez, triggering a four-car wreck in Turn 4 that ended the race under caution. It rendered victory unto Truex.

== Race results ==
=== Stage results ===
Stage 1 Laps: 80

Pos	No	Driver	Team	Manufacturer	Points
1	78	Martin Truex Jr.	Furniture Row Racing	Toyota	10
2	18	Kyle Busch	Joe Gibbs Racing	Toyota	9
3	42	Kyle Larson	Chip Ganassi Racing	Chevrolet	8
4	4	Kevin Harvick	Stewart–Haas Racing	Ford	7
5	1	Jamie McMurray	Chip Ganassi Racing	Chevrolet	6
6	20	Matt Kenseth	Joe Gibbs Racing	Toyota	5
7	11	Denny Hamlin	Joe Gibbs Racing	Toyota	4
8	77	Erik Jones (R)	Furniture Row Racing	Toyota	3
9	48	Jimmie Johnson	Hendrick Motorsports	Chevrolet	2
10	24	Chase Elliott	Hendrick Motorsports	Chevrolet	1
Official stage one results

Stage 2 Laps: 80

Pos	No	Driver	Team	Manufacturer	Points
1	78	Martin Truex Jr.	Furniture Row Racing	Toyota	10
2	18	Kyle Busch	Joe Gibbs Racing	Toyota	9
3	20	Matt Kenseth	Joe Gibbs Racing	Toyota	8
4	4	Kevin Harvick	Stewart–Haas Racing	Ford	7
5	77	Erik Jones (R)	Furniture Row Racing	Toyota	6
6	1	Jamie McMurray	Chip Ganassi Racing	Chevrolet	5
7	41	Kurt Busch	Stewart–Haas Racing	Ford	4
8	11	Denny Hamlin	Joe Gibbs Racing	Toyota	3
9	14	Clint Bowyer	Stewart–Haas Racing	Ford	2
10	24	Chase Elliott	Hendrick Motorsports	Chevrolet	1
Official stage two results

=== Final stage results ===
Stage 3 Laps: 114

Pos	Grid	No	Driver	Team	Manufacturer	Laps	Points
1	2	78	Martin Truex Jr.	Furniture Row Racing	Toyota	274	60
2	40	42	Kyle Larson	Chip Ganassi Racing	Chevrolet	274	43
3	12	24	Chase Elliott	Hendrick Motorsports	Chevrolet	274	36
4	5	11	Denny Hamlin	Joe Gibbs Racing	Toyota	274	40
5	1	18	Kyle Busch	Joe Gibbs Racing	Toyota	274	50
6	14	77	Erik Jones (R)	Furniture Row Racing	Toyota	274	40
7	4	1	Jamie McMurray	Chip Ganassi Racing	Chevrolet	274	41
8	11	22	Joey Logano	Team Penske	Ford	274	29
9	7	4	Kevin Harvick	Stewart–Haas Racing	Ford	274	42
10	6	21	Ryan Blaney	Wood Brothers Racing	Ford	273	27
11	17	43	Bubba Wallace (i)	Richard Petty Motorsports	Ford	273	0
12	13	88	Dale Earnhardt Jr.	Hendrick Motorsports	Chevrolet	273	25
13	16	14	Clint Bowyer	Stewart–Haas Racing	Ford	273	26
14	18	17	Ricky Stenhouse Jr.	Roush Fenway Racing	Ford	273	23
15	20	10	Danica Patrick	Stewart–Haas Racing	Ford	273	22
16	22	37	Chris Buescher	JTG Daugherty Racing	Chevrolet	273	21
17	3	20	Matt Kenseth	Joe Gibbs Racing	Toyota	273	33
18	9	19	Daniel Suárez (R)	Joe Gibbs Racing	Toyota	273	19
19	25	3	Austin Dillon	Richard Childress Racing	Chevrolet	272	18
20	28	47	A. J. Allmendinger	JTG Daugherty Racing	Chevrolet	272	17
21	24	27	Paul Menard	Richard Childress Racing	Chevrolet	272	16
22	29	31	Ryan Newman	Richard Childress Racing	Chevrolet	272	15
23	21	95	Michael McDowell	Leavine Family Racing	Chevrolet	271	14
24	26	38	David Ragan	Front Row Motorsports	Ford	270	13
25	30	32	Matt DiBenedetto	Go Fas Racing	Ford	270	12
26	35	34	Landon Cassill	Front Row Motorsports	Ford	268	11
27	31	83	Ryan Sieg (i)	BK Racing	Toyota	266	0
28	33	15	Reed Sorenson	Premium Motorsports	Chevrolet	265	9
29	36	33	Jeffrey Earnhardt	Circle Sport – The Motorsports Group	Chevrolet	265	8
30	15	41	Kurt Busch	Stewart–Haas Racing	Ford	264	11
31	38	66	Timmy Hill (i)	MBM Motorsports	Chevrolet	261	0
32	37	51	B. J. McLeod (i)	Rick Ware Racing	Chevrolet	260	0
33	27	13	Ty Dillon (R)	Germain Racing	Chevrolet	253	4
34	32	72	Cole Whitt	TriStar Motorsports	Chevrolet	212	3
35	39	55	Gray Gaulding (R)	Premium Motorsports	Toyota	206	2
36	34	23	Joey Gase (i)	BK Racing	Toyota	129	0
37	19	6	Trevor Bayne	Roush Fenway Racing	Ford	101	1
38	23	5	Kasey Kahne	Hendrick Motorsports	Chevrolet	93	1
39	10	2	Brad Keselowski	Team Penske	Ford	89	1
40	8	48	Jimmie Johnson	Hendrick Motorsports	Chevrolet	87	3
Official race results

=== Race statistics ===
- Lead changes: 9 among 4 different drivers
- Cautions/Laps: 9 for 39 laps
- Red flags: 0
- Time of race: 2 hours, 57 minutes and 55 seconds
- Average speed: 138.604 miles per hour (223.062 km/h)

== Media ==
=== Television ===
NBC Sports covered the race on the television side. Rick Allen, Jeff Burton and Steve Letarte called the race from the broadcast booth, while Dave Burns, Marty Snider and Kelli Stavast reported from pit lane.

NBCSN
Booth announcers	Pit reporters
Lap-by-lap: Rick Allen; Color commentator: Jeff Burton; Color commentator: Steve Letarte	Dave Burns; Marty Snider; Kelli Stavast

=== Radio ===
PRN had the radio call for the race, which was simulcast on SiriusXM's NASCAR Radio channel.

PRN
Booth announcers	Turn announcers	Pit reporters
Lead announcer: Doug Rice; Announcer: Mark Garrow; Announcer: Wendy Venturini	Turns 1 & 2: Rob Albright; Turns 3 & 4: Pat Patterson	Brad Gillie; Brett McMillan; Jim Noble; Steve Richards

== Standings after the race ==
Drivers' Championship standings

	Pos	Driver	Points
	1	Kyle Larson	710
	2	Martin Truex Jr.	709 (–1)
	3	Kyle Busch	609 (–101)
	4	Kevin Harvick	599 (–111)
1	5	Chase Elliott	560 (–150)
2	6	Jamie McMurray	545 (–165)
2	7	Denny Hamlin	538 (–172)
3	8	Brad Keselowski	536 (–174)
2	9	Jimmie Johnson	519 (–191)
	10	Clint Bowyer	495 (–215)
	11	Matt Kenseth	478 (–232)
	12	Joey Logano	471 (–239)
	13	Ryan Blaney	462 (–248)
3	14	Erik Jones	426 (–284)
1	15	Kurt Busch	419 (–291)
	16	Ricky Stenhouse Jr.	418 (–292)
Official driver's standings

Manufacturers' Championship standings

	Pos	Manufacturer	Points
1	1	Chevrolet	645
1	2	Ford	642 (–3)
	3	Toyota	612 (–33)
Official manufacturers' standings

- Note: Only the first 16 positions are included for the driver standings.
- . – Driver has clinched a position in the Monster Energy NASCAR Cup Series playoffs.

Previous race: 2017 Coke Zero 400	Monster Energy NASCAR Cup Series; 2017 season	Next race: 2017 Overton's 301
