= Speedway Motorsports =

Motorsport venue owner and operator

- Type: Private
- Industry: Motorsports
- Founded: 1994; 32 years ago
- Headquarters: Charlotte Motor Speedway, Concord, North Carolina
- Key people: Bruton Smith, founder Marcus G. Smith, President and CEO
- Products: Motorsport venues Legends cars
- Revenue: $570 million USD
- Number of employees: 793 (full time)
- Website: www.speedwaymotorsports.com

Speedway Motorsports, LLC is an American company that owns and manages auto racing facilities. The company was founded by Bruton Smith and is headquartered at Charlotte Motor Speedway in Concord, North Carolina, just north of Charlotte. Speedway Motorsports owns 11 racing facilities across the United States. In addition to operating racetracks, the company owns the Performance Racing Network (PRN) and U.S. Legend Cars International, and co-owns Motorsports Authentics. As of 2026, it owns the second-most racetracks used by NASCAR, behind only NASCAR itself.

After trading for 25 years on the New York Stock Exchange as Speedway Motorsports, Inc. (SMI; formerly NYSE: TRK), the company was taken private in September 2019. It is a wholly owned subsidiary of Sonic Financial Corporation, an entity controlled by members of the Smith family. The initialism remains in common colloquial use.

== History ==
=== Early history and founding ===
Speedway Motorsports didn't officially incorporate until 1994. Bruton Smith began building SMI in the 1950s when he worked as a race promoter and eventually built Charlotte Motor Speedway in 1959. Smith left the racing business in the early 1960s to pursue other business ventures. He became very successful and by 1975 had owned majority shares in CMS and took over as CEO. A year later he appointed Humpy Wheeler as general manager. Smith began to expand CMS, adding additional grandstands and facilities including condominiums, a first for a sports facility.

=== Formation and public offering ===
In 1990, Smith began to acquire additional speedway properties beginning with Atlanta Motor Speedway. As he did with Charlotte, Smith began expanding seating and facilities at Atlanta. In 1992, lights were added to CMS, making it one of the first speedways to offer night racing, and the company developed the Legends car racing circuit, now called U.S. Legend Cars International. Smith incorporated Speedway Motorsports in December 1994, and on February 24, 1995 took the company public by offering shares of stock, debuting at $18 per share.

=== Expansion and track acquisitions ===
In 1996, SMI began to quickly expand, acquiring two additional facilities; Bristol Motor Speedway and Sonoma Raceway. A year later, the company finished construction of the $250 million, 150,000 seat Texas Motor Speedway. Between 1993 and 1998, SMI had increased its total seating capacity from 176,000 to 551,000. In 1999 SMI outbid rival International Speedway Corporation (ISC) to purchase Las Vegas Motor Speedway. Smith had outbid ISC by $15 million to make a total $215 million purchase. That same year, SMI sold the naming rights of its flagship Charlotte Motor Speedway to Lowe's, a $35 million deal that would last until 2009.

=== Competition with ISC and strategic growth ===
Until 1999, Speedway Motorsports was the top track owner in the motorsports industry. That year, International Speedway Corporation, then the second largest track owner, acquired Penske Motorsports, then the third largest track owner. The $623 million deal propelled ISC to the top track owner, and SMI fell to second. Smith then turned his attention towards securing two NASCAR dates at each of his facilities. As of 2011, only four SMI owned tracks hold two NASCAR dates.

SMI purchased North Wilkesboro Speedway and New Hampshire Motor Speedway in 2007, and in 2008 purchased Kentucky Speedway. Today SMI owns nine racing facilities, eight of which are used to host major racing series including NASCAR, IndyCar and NHRA. As of December 31, 2009, the combined total permanent seating capacity was approximately 885,000. SMI owned tracks host 13 of the 36 NASCAR Cup Series races, including four races in the NASCAR playoffs, plus the NASCAR All-Star Race.

=== Recent developments and partnerships ===
In December 2018, Nashville Fairgrounds Speedway operator Tony Formosa Jr. reached an agreement with Speedway Motorsports and its main Tennessee track Bristol Motor Speedway to co-operate the facility and make the necessary upgrades for the track to host NASCAR Xfinity Series and NASCAR Camping World Truck Series races again and continue to host weekly racing events. Efforts were renewed in late 2020 as SMI and Bristol launched negotiations with the City of Nashville with the goal of hosting NASCAR races as early as 2022. The track ultimately did not hold races in 2022, although talks between both parties continued.

When NASCAR announced that Circuit of the Americas in Austin, Texas, would host the national series beginning in 2021, SMI assumed management responsibilities for the NASCAR at COTA race weekend.

In addition to speedway properties, SMI also owns the Performance Racing Network, a radio network that broadcasts all NASCAR Cup and O'Reilly series races at SMI owned tracks. SMI also equally owns Motorsports Authentics, a joint venture formed with International Speedway Corporation, to produce, market and sell licensed motorsports merchandise.

In 2026, Speedway Motorsports (SMI) bought into the ownership group of the CARS Tour.

== Facilities owned ==
Track	Location	Facility acreage	Main layout*	Seating capacity	Year opened	Year acquired
Atlanta Motor Speedway	Hampton, Georgia	820	1.54 miles (2.48 km) quad-oval	71,000	1960	1990
Bristol Motor Speedway	Bristol, Tennessee	670	0.533 miles (0.858 km) oval	146,000	1961	1996
Charlotte Motor Speedway	Concord, North Carolina	1,310	1.5 miles (2.4 km) quad-oval	94,000	1960	1975
Dover Motor Speedway	Dover, Delaware		1 mile (1.6 km) oval	58,500	1969	2021
Kentucky Speedway	Sparta, Kentucky	820	1.5 miles (2.4 km) tri-oval	107,000	2000	2008
Las Vegas Motor Speedway	Las Vegas, Nevada	1,030	1.5 miles (2.4 km) D-shaped-oval	80,000	1996	1999
Nashville Superspeedway	Lebanon, Tennessee		1.333 miles (2.145 km) D-shaped-oval	38,000	2001	2021
New Hampshire Motor Speedway	Loudon, New Hampshire	1,180	1.058 miles (1.703 km) oval	88,000	1990	2007
North Wilkesboro Speedway	North Wilkesboro, North Carolina	49	0.625 miles (1.006 km) oval	18,000	1947	2007
Sonoma Raceway	Sonoma, California	1,600	1.99 miles (3.20 km) road course	47,000	1968	1996
Texas Motor Speedway	Fort Worth, Texas	1,490	1.5 miles (2.4 km) quad-oval	100,000	1996	Built
*Some facilities include multiple layouts and multiple tracks including road courses, dirt ovals and dragways

== Notable purchases ==
SMI has a history of purchasing tracks to obtain NASCAR race dates. The company's purchases and closures of the tracks in order to obtain a second NASCAR date for Texas Motor Speedway led to the Ferko lawsuit.

=== North Wilkesboro Speedway ===
In 1996, the company purchased half interest in North Wilkesboro Speedway in North Wilkesboro, North Carolina along with Bob Bahre of New Hampshire International Speedway (now New Hampshire Motor Speedway). SMI moved one of North Wilkesboro Speedway's dates to Texas Motor Speedway and Bob Bahre moved the second date to his facility. On November 2, 2007, SMI purchased NHIS and part of the purchase resulted in SMI gaining full ownership of North Wilkesboro Speedway.

=== North Carolina Speedway ===
In 2004, as a result of the Ferko lawsuit, SMI gained ownership of the North Carolina Speedway in Rockingham, North Carolina. SMI closed North Carolina Speedway and moved the track's final race date to Texas Motor Speedway. On October 2, 2007, SMI sold North Carolina Speedway at auction. The track was purchased by "Indiana" Andy Hillenburg for $4.4 million, and renamed Rockingham Speedway.

=== New Hampshire Motor Speedway ===
On November 2, 2007, SMI announced the purchase of New Hampshire International Speedway from Bob Bahre, and renamed the facility New Hampshire Motor Speedway. This has led to speculation that SMI would move one of New Hampshire's dates to Las Vegas Motor Speedway and/or swap the date with the fall race at Texas Motor Speedway (TMS has expressed an interest in moving the fall race away from the first weekend in November, which is also the opening weekend of deer hunting season in Texas). In 2018, the fall race weekend was moved to Las Vegas.

=== Kentucky Speedway ===
On May 22, 2008, SMI announced it had purchased Kentucky Speedway from Kentucky Speedway, LLC. The track had been trying to secure a NASCAR Sprint Cup race for several years. SMI was finally victorious in their pursuit, with Kentucky Speedway receiving its inaugural Sprint Cup race on July 9, 2011. It appears this came at the expense of SMI-owned Atlanta Motor Speedway, which dropped from two races to one on the 2011 Sprint Cup schedule. It was announced in September 2020 that Kentucky Speedway would not return for the 2021 NASCAR Cup Series schedule, and its date would be given back to Atlanta Motor Speedway.

=== Dover Motorsports ===
Dover Motorsports Incorporated

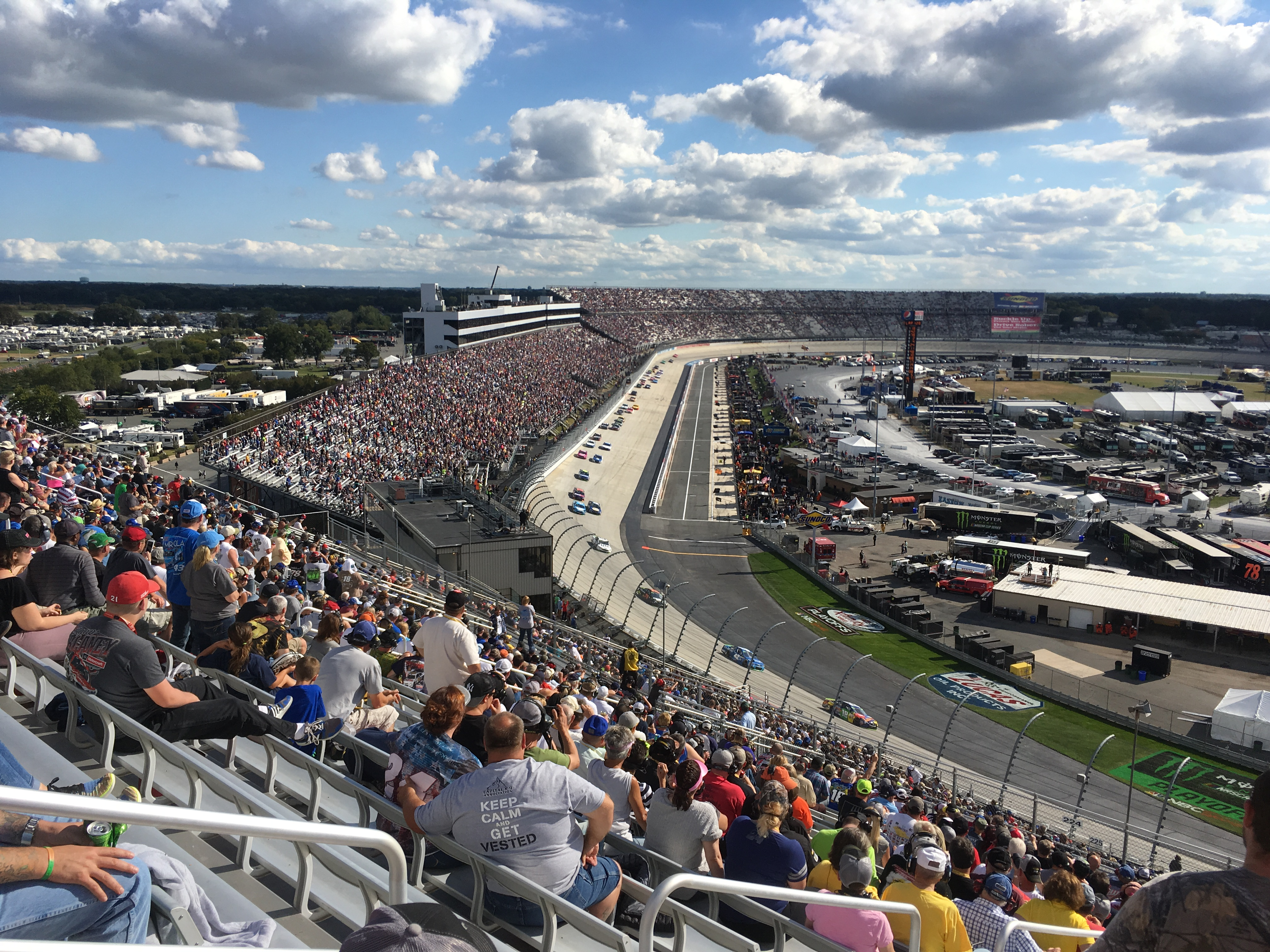
- Dover International Speedway in 2017
- Type: Private
- Industry: Motorsports
- Defunct: December 31, 2021
- Headquarters: Dover, Delaware
- Products: Sporting events
- Website: dovermotorsports.com

Dover Motorsports, Inc. (formerly Dover Downs Entertainment) was a company that owned several auto racing circuits in the United States. The company was based in Dover, Delaware, the home of its flagship track Dover International Speedway, a 1-mile (1.6 km) concrete oval with a seating capacity of 95,500 that opened in 1969. The company formerly owned the Dover Downs harness racing track adjacent to the Dover speedway. Dover Motorsports also operated Nashville Superspeedway, a 1.333-mile concrete oval track in Lebanon, Tennessee.

Dover Motorsports owned Memphis Motorsports Park, a 0.75-mile tri-oval asphalt short track in Millington, Tennessee, but closed the track in October 2009 to competition. It was later sold to Palm Beach International Raceway after sitting unused for over a year. Dover also owned Gateway International Raceway, a 1.25-mile egg-shaped asphalt oval track in Madison, Illinois, which was sold in 2011. After attempts to sell Nashville Superspeedway, the venue reopened in 2021 and hosted a NASCAR race weekend, replacing one of the race weekends at Dover International Speedway.

On November 8, 2021, Speedway Motorsports announced that it had agreed to purchase Dover Motorsports, owner of Dover International Speedway and Nashville Superspeedway at the time, for $3.61 per share in cash for an approximate total equity value of $131.5 million. The deal closed in December, with SMI gaining full control of the two tracks.

== Principal subsidiaries ==
Tracks

- Atlanta Motor Speedway, Inc.
- Bristol Motor Speedway, Inc.
- Charlotte Motor Speedway, Inc.
- Las Vegas Motor Speedway LLC
- SPR Acquisition Corporation d/b/a Sears Point Raceway
- Texas Motor Speedway, Inc.
- Dover Motor Speedway, Inc.
- Nashville Superspeedway, Inc.

Other

- Speedway Systems LLC d/b/a Finish Line Events
- 600 Racing, Inc.
- INEX Corporation
- The Speedway Club, Inc.
- Oil-Chem Research Corporation
- Speedway Funding Corporation
- Sonoma Funding Corporation
