= Quaker State 400 (Kentucky) =

Annual auto race at Kentucky Speedway

NASCAR Cup Series
- Venue: Kentucky Speedway
- Location: Sparta, Kentucky, United States
- Corporate sponsor: Quaker State
- First race: 2011
- Last race: 2020
- Distance: 400.5 mi (644.5 km)
- Laps: 267 (Stages 1/2: 80 each Final stage: 107)
- Most wins (driver): Brad Keselowski (3)
- Most wins (team): Joe Gibbs Racing; Team Penske (3)
- Most wins (manufacturer): Toyota (5)

Circuit information
- Surface: Asphalt
- Length: 1.5 mi (2.4 km)
- Turns: 4

The Quaker State 400 presented by Walmart was a 400.5-mile (644.5 km) annual NASCAR Cup Series race held at Kentucky Speedway in Sparta, Kentucky. The inaugural event was held on July 9, 2011, and was won by Kyle Busch. From 2012 to 2014, the race was held the week before the Coke Zero 400 at Daytona International Speedway on Independence Day weekend. From 2015 to 2019, the event moved back two weeks, coming after Daytona and preceding New Hampshire.

Cole Custer won the last running of the event in 2020; the race returned to Atlanta Motor Speedway in 2021.

== History ==
The event eventuated following a lawsuit in which Kentucky Speedway claimed NASCAR had violated federal antitrust laws in 2005. In 2008, the speedway was sold to Bruton Smith, hoping that the track could hold a race by 2011 and after four years, the former speedway owners abandoned the lawsuit. In April 2010, NASCAR announced that the track could hold a Cup Series event in 2011. Seven months later, Royal Dutch Shell's Quaker State brand was announced as sponsor and the 267 lap race held on July 9, was won by Kyle Busch. The race was plagued by a massive traffic problem where many of the fans who expected to attend the race were turned away after several hours on Interstate 71. Following the problem, Kentucky Speedway announced that they bought more land for parking and began to work with the state government to improve traffic around the speedway in time for the 2012 race.

=== New aero package for 2015 ===
On June 16, 2015, NASCAR announced that a new aero package would be used for the 2015 race. The changes include a smaller rear spoiler and other adjustments that significantly reduced aerodynamic downforce. The spoiler was decreased to 3.5 in (8.9 cm) tall. There was also a 25 in (64 cm) wide splitter extension. In addition, tires supplied by Goodyear provided drivers with more grip. "We want to see more lead changes on the racetrack," NASCAR Executive Vice-President and Chief Racing Development Officer Steve O'Donnell said in a media teleconference. "We'll evaluate that and a number of different factors coming out of Kentucky, see what we can learn and implement down the road." Originally, the package was to be used at this year's All-Star Race, but the plan was scrubbed and NASCAR opted to use the package for a points race. "Let me be clear. This is not a test, this is a race," O'Donnell said of the rules package that will be in effect for the 18th round of the 2015 NASCAR Sprint Cup Series. "We've had an extensive testing plan with the industry over the last 18 months. We wouldn't implement this if we didn't feel confident as an industry to implement it at Kentucky."

== Trophy ==
Since 2015, the race trophy has been in the form of a jukebox.

== Past winners ==
Year	Date	No.	Driver	Team	Manufacturer	Race Distance		Race Time	Average Speed (mph)	Report	Ref
Year	Date	No.	Driver	Team	Manufacturer	Laps	Miles (km)	Race Time	Average Speed (mph)	Report	Ref
2011	July 9	18	Kyle Busch	Joe Gibbs Racing	Toyota	267	400.5 (644.542)	2:55:00	137.314	Report	
2012	June 30	2	Brad Keselowski	Penske Racing	Dodge	267	400.5 (644.542)	2:45:02	145.607	Report	
2013	June 30*	20	Matt Kenseth	Joe Gibbs Racing	Toyota	267	400.5 (644.542)	3:02:07	131.948	Report	
2014	June 28	2	Brad Keselowski	Team Penske	Ford	267	400.5 (644.542)	2:51:59	139.723	Report	
2015	July 11	18	Kyle Busch	Joe Gibbs Racing	Toyota	267	400.5 (644.542)	3:05:42	129.402	Report	
2016	July 9	2	Brad Keselowski	Team Penske	Ford	267	400.5 (644.542)	3:06:55	128.58	Report	
2017	July 8	78	Martin Truex Jr.	Furniture Row Racing	Toyota	274*	411 (661.44)	2:57:55	138.604	Report	
2018	July 14	78	Martin Truex Jr.	Furniture Row Racing	Toyota	267	400.5 (644.542)	2:39:43	150.454	Report	
2019	July 13	1	Kurt Busch	Chip Ganassi Racing	Chevrolet	269*	403.5 (649.370)	2:51:37	141.07	Report	
2020	July 12*	41	Cole Custer	Stewart–Haas Racing	Ford	267	400.5 (644.542)	2:59:49	133.636	Report	

=== Notes ===
- 2013: Postponed from Saturday night to Sunday afternoon because of rain.
- 2020: Originally scheduled as a Saturday night event, was rescheduled to a Sunday afternoon event by NASCAR due to the COVID-19 pandemic.
- 2017 & 2019: Race extended due to NASCAR Overtime.

=== Multiple winners (drivers) ===
# Wins	Team	Years won
3	Brad Keselowski	2012, 2014, 2016
2	Kyle Busch	2011, 2015
2	Martin Truex Jr.	2017, 2018

=== Multiple winners (teams) ===
# Wins	Team	Years won	Ref(s)
3	Joe Gibbs Racing	2011, 2013, 2015	
3	Team Penske	2012, 2014, 2016	
2	Furniture Row Racing	2017, 2018	

=== Manufacturer wins ===
# Wins	Manufacturer	Years won
5	Toyota	2011, 2013, 2015, 2017, 2018
3	Ford	2014, 2016, 2020
1	Dodge	2012
1	Chevrolet	2019

=== Sponsor wins ===
# Wins	Sponsor	Years won
3	Miller Lite	2012, 2014, 2016
2	M&M's	2011, 2015

== Notable moments ==
- 2011: This was the first Cup Series event at Kentucky Speedway, The race was won by Kyle Busch for the Joe Gibbs Racing team. David Reutimann finished second, and Jimmie Johnson clinched third, The race, the 18th in the season, began at 7:30 pm EDT and was televised live in the United States on TNT. The conditions on the grid were dry before the race with the air temperature at 81 °F (27 °C). Raceway Ministries pastor John Roberts began pre-race ceremonies, by giving the invocation. Next, Nick Lachey performed the national anthem, and Kentucky Governor Steve Beshear, gave the command for drivers to start their engines. Two drivers had to start at the end of the grid because of changes that were not approved during practice; they were Hamlin and Dave Blaney. However, the race was largely overshadowed by major traffic issues that resulted in as many as 20,000 ticketed fans being unable to enter the track.
- 2012: The race, the 17th of the 2012 NASCAR Sprint Cup Series season began at 7:48 EDT. The race was televised live in the United States on TNT. Jimmie Johnson started on pole position. The Kentucky Army National Guard and the Boone County Sheriff's Office presented the flag. The invocation was offered by Pastor John Roberts of Raceway Ministries. Laura Bell Bundy performed the national anthem. The grand marshal was Quaker State Official Steve Reindl. Brad Keselowski stretched his final tank of fuel the final 59 laps to the win.
- 2013: The race was scheduled to start Saturday at 8:00 p.m., but pushed to Sunday afternoon due to rain, at 12:00 p.m. E.T., This prompted NASCAR to have a competition caution on Lap 30. The third caution of the race flew on lap 48 for a huge crash in the front straightaway, Brad Keselowski, Greg Biffle, Kurt Busch and others were involved in the incident, it started with Brad Keselowski spinning in the grass, and took out multiple cars, The red flag was displayed with Jimmie Johnson the race leader, it was lifted after 5 minutes and 3 seconds. Jimmie Johnson dominated the race, leading a race-high 182 laps, but spun on a late restart after pitting. Matt Kenseth stayed out on strategy, and became the third different winner.
- 2014: The race served as the last year on TNT, before the acquisition of the $10.1 billion deal for NBC Sports, Prior to the start of the race, there was a downpour that soaked the track. This prompted NASCAR to schedule a competition caution at lap 30. Logano led the field to the restart on lap 85, before Keselowski was able to retake the lead two laps later. Another lengthy green-flag run ensued, before debris forced the third caution of the race, on lap 125. Prior to the caution, Matt Kenseth suffered a flat right-front tire, and had to pit from sixth position. Logano retook the lead during the pit cycle, while Jeff Gordon suffered a slow pit stop due to a malfunctioning air hose; he lost a total of 16 positions, dropping from 7th to 23rd. Logano and Keselowski swapped the lead positions once again, prior to the fourth caution, on lap 153, for a multi-car wreck on the backstretch involving Aric Almirola, Alex Bowman, Kasey Kahne and Jamie McMurray. Bowman locked up his brakes and tires, causing a large cloud of smoke that made it difficult for trailing cars to see what was in front of them. When the smoke cleared, Almirola swerved to his right to avoid Bowman, but in the process got into the left side of McMurray's car. After leading 199 laps from the Pole, Keselowski became the first repeat winner of the event.
- 2015: NBC returned with the fifth running of the Quaker State 400, aired live on NBCSN, The race had a new track record of eleven caution flag periods for 49 laps, Carl Edwards went three wide underneath his teammate to take the lead with 54 laps to go. He got loose in turn 1 and Hamlin took back the lead with 53 laps to go. After Busch got around Logano with 20 laps to go, he drove off to become the second repeat winner at the track.
- 2016: Kentucky Speedway underwent a reconfiguration and repaving in the spring. The race aired on NBCSN for a second year, A multi-car wreck on the backstretch brought out the seventh caution of the race on lap 94. Exiting turn 2, Brian Scott got loose, saved the car, got turned by Kyle Larson and got t-boned by Chris Buescher. A. J. Allmendinger, Buescher, Ty Dillon, Larson, Danica Patrick, Regan Smith, Scott and Cole Whitt were all collected in the melee., In the final 10 laps, a number of cars began pitting so to have enough fuel to make the finish. Kenseth briefly took the lead from Keselowski before he pitted with four laps to go and handed the lead back to Keselowski. Keselowski decreased his speed dramatically to conserve fuel. This allowed Carl Edwards to pull to within a car-length with one lap remaining. He blocked Edwards's advance as he re-fired his engine and drove on to score the victory.
- 2017: Martin Truex Jr. dominated the seventh running of the event leading 152 laps. He won both stages 1 and 2 (NASCAR's new race format that saw stage lengths of 80 laps, 80 laps, and the final 107) and had a 15-second lead with two laps to go until the caution came out setting up an overtime finish for the first time in the event's history. Truex Jr. stayed out while everyone else pitted, but he chose the preferred outside lane for the restart. He took off from the start passing Kyle Busch and the race ended under caution due to a crash on the frontstretch after Truex Jr. had just taken the white flag. He took the yellow and checkered-flags ahead of Kyle Larson for his third win of the season. He became just the fourth driver to win at Kentucky, and the first new winner since Matt Kenseth in 2013.
- 2018: Martin Truex Jr. did a repeat of his 2017 performance by winning both stages, dominating the race, and ultimately winning the race. It was the last win for Furniture Row Racing after they shut down at the end of the season.
- 2019: The Busch brothers would dominate the event with eldest brother Kurt Busch winning stage 1, and Kyle Busch winning stage 2. Late in the race Joey Logano passed Busch and looked as if he was on his way to an easy win until the caution came out, forcing the race to go into overtime. Kurt restarted in fourth on four tires, and passed leader Logano and his younger brother on the outside. On the final lap, the brothers stayed side by side, and in a photo finish Kurt edged Kyle by 0.076-seconds. Giving Chevrolet its first win at the track, and making Kurt the fifth driver to win in the facility's history.
- 2020: On the final lap, Stewart–Haas Racing's Cole Custer made a bold 4-wide move to the outside of Martin Truex Jr, Custer's teammate Kevin Harvick, and Penske's Ryan Blaney to take his first NASCAR Cup Series victory at what ended up being the final Cup Series race at Kentucky Speedway.

== See also ==
- NASCAR Xfinity Series at Kentucky Speedway
- NASCAR Camping World Truck Series at Kentucky Speedway
- General Tire 150 (Kentucky)
