= 2004 Pop Secret 500 =

Race details
- Race 25 of 36 in the 2004 NASCAR Nextel Cup Series
- 2004 Pop Secret 500 program cover
- Date: September 5, 2004
- Official name: Pop Secret 500
- Location: California Speedway, Fontana, California
- Course: Permanent racing facility
- Course length: 2.0 miles (3.219 km)
- Distance: 250 laps, 500 mi (804.672 km)
- Average speed: 128.324 miles per hour (206.517 km/h)
- Attendance: 90,000

Pole position
Driver	Brian Vickers	Hendrick Motorsports
- Time: 38.417

Most laps led
Driver	Mark Martin	Roush Racing
- Laps: 65

Winner
No. 38	Elliott Sadler	Robert Yates Racing

Television in the United States
- Network: NBC
- Announcers: Allen Bestwick, Benny Parsons and Wally Dallenbach Jr.

The 2004 Pop Secret 500 was a NASCAR Nextel Cup Series stock car race held on September 5, 2004, at California Speedway in Fontana, California. Contested over 250 laps on the 2-mile (3.2-kilometre) asphalt D-shaped oval, it was the 25th race of the 2004 NASCAR Nextel Cup Series. Elliott Sadler, driving for Robert Yates Racing, won the race.

The first fall race at California Speedway would be held on Labor Day weekend, bumping the Mountain Dew Southern 500 off as part of the 2004 NASCAR Realignment. Brian Vickers won the pole. Portions of this race were filmed for the 2005 film Herbie: Fully Loaded. Rookie Kasey Kahne got his fifth 2nd-place finish of the season. This was the NASCAR Cup Series debut for J. J. Yeley.

== Qualifying ==
1. Brian Vickers #25 GMAC Financial Services Chevrolet Hendrick Motorsports 187.417 mph

2. Jeremy Mayfield #19 Dodge Dealers/UAW Dodge Evernham Motorsports 186.364 mph

3. Bill Elliott #98 McDonalds Dodge Evernham Motorsports 186.307 mph

4. Kurt Busch #97 Sharpie/IRWIN FordR oush Racing 185.955 mph

5. Kasey Kahne #9 Dodge Dealers/UAW Dodge Evernham Motorsports 185.816 mph

6. Casey Mears #41 Target House Dodge Chip Ganassi Racing 185.802 mph

7. Greg Biffle #16 National Guard Ford Roush Racing 185.773 mph

8. Jeff Gordon #24 DuPont Chevrolet Hendrick Motorsports 185.658 mph

9. Scott Riggs #10 Valvoline Chevrolet MBV Motorsports 185.557 mph

10. Joe Nemechek #01 US Army Chevrolet MB2 Motorsports 185.553 mph

11. Mark Martin #6 Viagra Ford Roush Racing 185.529 mph

12. Dale Earnhardt Jr. #8 Budweiser Chevrolet Dale Earnhardt Incorporated 185.266 mph

13. Jeff Green #43 Cheerios/Betty Crocker Dodge Petty Enterprises 185.261 mph

14. Ryan Newman #12 ALLTEL/Sony Handycam Dodge Penske Racing 185.180 mph

15. Terry Labonte #5 Kellogg's Chevrolet Hendrick Motorsports 184.810 mph

16. Jimmie Johnson #48 Lowe's Chevrolet Hendrick Motorsports 184.772 mph

17. Elliott Sadler #38 M&M's Ford Robert Yates Racing 184.431 mph

18. Kyle Busch #84 CARQUEST Chevrolet Hendrick Motorsports 184.374 mph

19. Carl Edwards #99 Shop Rat Ford Roush Racing 184.360 mph

20. Ricky Rudd #21 Motorcraft/US Air Force Ford Wood Brothers Racing 184.195 mph

21. Michael Waltrip #15 NAPA Auto Parts Chevrolet Dale Earnhardt Incorporated 184.135 mph

22. Brendan Gaughan #77 Kodak/Jasper Engines Dodge Penske/Jasper Racing 184.106 mph

23. Jamie McMurray #42 Texaco Havoline Dodge Chip Ganassi Racing 184.091 mph

24. Bobby Hamilton Jr #32 Tide Chevrolet PPI Motorsports 184.073 mph

25. Dale Jarrett #88 UPS Ford Robert Yates Racing 183.932 mph

26. Rusty Wallace #2 Miller Lite Dodge Penske Racing 183.899 mph

27. Kevin Harvick #29 GM Goodwrench Chevrolet Richard Childress Racing 183.734 mph

28. Kyle Petty #45 Georgia Pacific/Brawny Dodge Petty Enterprises 183.673 mph

29. Shane Hmiel #23 Bill Davis Racing Dodge Bill Davis Racing 183.613 mph

30. Matt Kenseth #17 DeWalt Ford Roush Racing 183.589 mph

31. Sterling Marlin #40 Coors Light Dodge Chip Ganassi Racing 183.486 mph

32. J J Yeley #11 Vigoro/Home Depot Chevrolet Joe Gibbs Racing 183.243 mph

33. Tony Stewart #20 Home Depot Chevrolet Joe Gibbs Racing183.206 mph

34. Jeff Burton # 30 America Online Chevrolet Richard Childress Racing 182.987 mph

35. Robby Gordon #31 Cingular Wireless Chevrolet Richard Childress Racing 182.788 mph

36. Boris Said #136 Centrix Financial Chevrolet MB2 Motorsports 182.778 mph

37. Bobby Labonte #18 Wellbutrin XL Chevrolet Joe Gibbs Racing 182.741 mph

38. Scott Wimmer #22 Caterpillar Dodge Bill Davis Racing 182.551 mph

39. Ward Burton #0 Netzero HiSpeed ChevroletHaas CNC Racing 182.131 mph (provisional)

40. Ken Schrader #49 Schwan's Home Service Dodge BAM Racing 181.369 mph (provisional)

41. Jimmy Spencer #4 Morgan-McClure Chevrolet Morgan-McClure Racing 182.209 mph (provisional)

42. Jeff Fuller #50 Arnold Development Companies Dodge Arnold Developments 180.991 mph (provisional)

43. Derrike Cope #96 Mach One Inc Ford William Edwards no time (provisional)

Did not qualify

44. Morgan Shepherd #89 Racing With Jesus/Red Line Oil Dodge Cindy Shepherd 178.191 mph

45. Kirk Shelmerdine #72 Freddie B's Ford Kirk Shelmerdine 176.592 mph

46. Hermie Sadler #02 SCORE Motorsports Chevrolet Angela Sadler 179.730 mph

47. Kevin Lepage #37 Carter's Royal Dispos-all Dodge John Carter 180.591 mph

48. Mike Wallace #35 Gary Keller Racing Chevrolet Gary Keller Racing 179.368 mph

== Results ==
Pos	St	No.	Driver	Car	Laps	Money	Status	Led	Points
1	17	38	Elliott Sadler	Ford	250	279398	running	59	185
2	5	9	Kasey Kahne	Dodge	250	190315	running	39	175
3	11	6	Mark Martin	Ford	250	144450	running	65	175
4	23	42	Jamie McMurray	Dodge	250	124500	running	0	160
5	14	12	Ryan Newman	Dodge	250	154367	running	2	160
6	19	99	Carl Edwards	Ford	250	136792	running	0	150
7	9	10	Scott Riggs	Chevrolet	250	121437	running	0	146
8	25	88	Dale Jarrett	Ford	250	124642	running	0	142
9	35	31	Robby Gordon	Chevrolet	250	128612	running	8	143
10	26	2	Rusty Wallace	Dodge	250	131808	running	0	134
11	4	97	Kurt Busch	Ford	250	114700	running	7	135
12	10	01	Joe Nemechek	Chevrolet	250	108425	running	0	127
13	1	25	Brian Vickers	Chevrolet	250	107625	running	44	129
14	16	48	Jimmie Johnson	Chevrolet	250	103800	running	1	126
15	34	30	Jeff Burton	Chevrolet	250	96200	running	0	118
16	2	19	Jeremy Mayfield	Dodge	250	110900	running	9	120
17	20	21	Ricky Rudd	Ford	250	111556	running	0	112
18	33	20	Tony Stewart	Chevrolet	250	127978	running	0	109
19	15	5	Terry Labonte	Chevrolet	250	110775	running	0	106
20	37	18	Bobby Labonte	Chevrolet	250	127033	running	0	103
21	38	22	Scott Wimmer	Dodge	250	103875	running	0	100
22	30	17	Matt Kenseth	Ford	250	129803	running	0	97
23	21	15	Michael Waltrip	Chevrolet	250	115606	running	10	99
24	18	84	Kyle Busch	Chevrolet	250	78250	running	0	91
25	3	98	Bill Elliott	Dodge	250	77925	running	0	88
26	31	40	Sterling Marlin	Dodge	250	114325	running	0	85
27	13	43	Jeff Green	Dodge	250	106935	running	0	82
28	27	29	Kevin Harvick	Chevrolet	250	116238	running	0	79
29	6	41	Casey Mears	Dodge	249	90750	running	0	76
30	36	36	Boris Said	Chevrolet	249	77700	running	0	73
31	39	0	Ward Burton	Chevrolet	248	80150	running	0	70
32	41	4	Jimmy Spencer	Chevrolet	247	79600	running	1	72
33	40	49	Ken Schrader	Dodge	231	77050	engine	1	69
34	12	8	Dale Earnhardt Jr.	Chevrolet	231	125103	crash	0	61
35	28	45	Kyle Petty	Dodge	225	85339	engine	0	58
36	7	16	Greg Biffle	Ford	213	84900	crash	0	55
37	8	24	Jeff Gordon	Chevrolet	209	124228	engine	0	52
38	24	32	Bobby Hamilton Jr.	Chevrolet	207	84800	running	0	49
39	29	23	Shane Hmiel	Dodge	173	76740	transmission	4	51
40	43	96	Derrike Cope	Ford	154	76690	crash	0	43
41	32	11	J. J. Yeley	Chevrolet	32	76640	crash	0	40
42	22	77	Brendan Gaughan	Dodge	32	84585	crash	0	37
43	42	50	Jeff Fuller	Dodge	5	75875	overheating	0	34
Failed to qualify or withdrew
Pos	Name	No.	Car						
44	Kevin Lepage	37	Dodge						
45	Hermie Sadler	02	Chevrolet						
46	Mike Wallace	35	Chevrolet						
47	Morgan Shepherd	89	Dodge						
48	Kirk Shelmerdine	72	Ford						
WD	Joe Ruttman	09	Dodge						
WD	Damon Lusk	62	Chevrolet						
WD	Tony Raines	92	Ford						
WD	Steve Grissom	93	Chevrolet						

== Race statistics ==
- Time of race: 3:53:47
- Average speed: 128.324 miles per hour (206.517 km/h)
- Pole speed: 187.417 miles per hour (301.618 km/h)
- Cautions: 11 for 51 laps
- Margin of victory: 0.263 seconds
- Lead changes: 29
- Percent of race run under caution: 20.4%
- Average green flag run: 16.6 laps
