= NASCAR races at Daytona International Speedway (Road Course) =

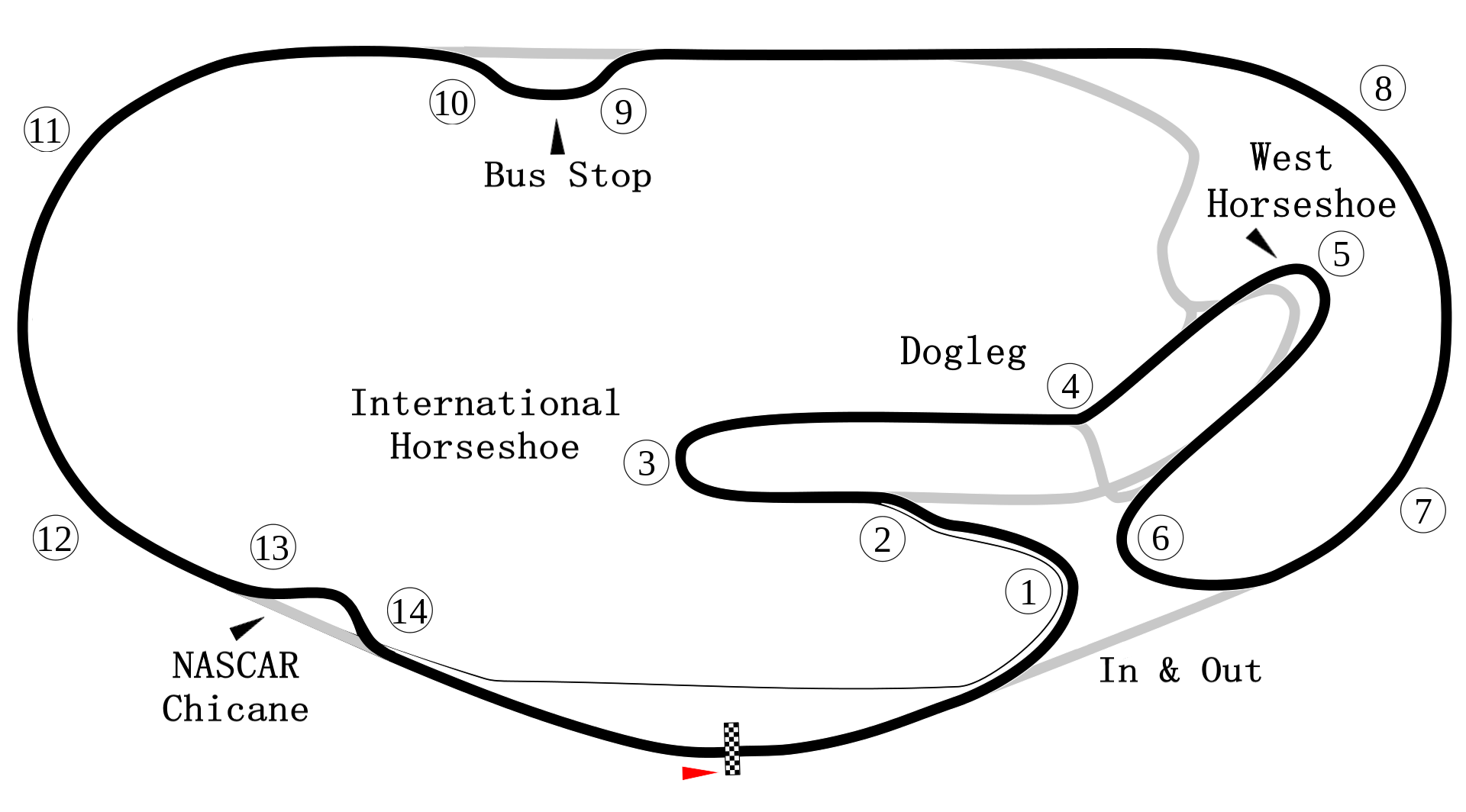
Layout of Daytona International Speedway's road course used for stock car races in 2020 and 2021.

In 2020 and 2021, NASCAR held races at Daytona International Speedway's road course layout as part of emergency rescheduling due to COVID-19 pandemic. The races replaced races at Watkins Glen International in 2020 and at Auto Club Speedway in 2021.

- O'Reilly Auto Parts 253, the NASCAR Cup Series race
- Super Start Batteries 188, the then-NASCAR Xfinity Series race
- BrakeBest Select 159, the then-NASCAR Gander RV & Outdoors/Camping World Truck Series race
- General Tire 100, the ARCA Menards Series race (held only in 2020)
