= NASCAR Camping World Truck Series at Kentucky Speedway =

NASCAR truck race at Kentucky Speedway

NASCAR Craftsman Truck Series
- Venue: Kentucky Speedway
- Location: Sparta, Kentucky, United States

Circuit information
- Surface: Asphalt
- Length: 1.5 mi (2.4 km)
- Turns: 4

Pickup truck racing events in the NASCAR Camping World Truck Series have been held at Kentucky Speedway in Sparta, Kentucky, during numerous seasons and times of year from 2000 to 2020.

Kentucky received a second date beginning in 2011 as part of NASCAR's 2011 schedule realignment before it went back down to one race in 2013.

== Kentucky 201 ==
Kentucky 201
- First race: 2000
- Last race: 2012
- Distance: 201 miles (323.48 km)
- Laps: 134
- Previous names: Kroger 225 (2000–2002); Built Ford Tough 225 (2003–2010); Kentucky 225 (2011); Kentucky 201 (2012)
- Most wins (driver): Ron Hornaday Jr.
- Most wins (team): Kevin Harvick Incorporated (3)
- Most wins (manufacturer): Chevrolet (6)

The Kentucky 201 was a NASCAR Craftsman Truck Series race held at Kentucky Speedway in Sparta, Kentucky. The race, originally held in June or July, was moved to September in 2010. One year later, the race was moved to October. The race, beginning in 2000, was the only Truck Series event at the track until 2010, when another event, the UNOH 225, was added. In 2012, the event's distance was shortened from 225 to 201 miles, marking the first time the race wasn't 225 miles in length. The race was removed from the 2013 season.

=== Past winners ===
Year	Date	No.	Driver	Team	Manufacturer	Race Distance		Race Time	Average Speed (mph)	Ref
Year	Date	No.	Driver	Team	Manufacturer	Laps	Miles (km)	Race Time	Average Speed (mph)	Ref
2000	June 17	50	Greg Biffle	Roush Racing	Ford	150	225 (362.102)	2:17:13	98.385	
2001	July 14	2	Scott Riggs	Ultra Motorsports	Dodge	150	225 (362.102)	1:58:55	113.525	
2002	July 13	16	Mike Bliss	Xpress Motorsports	Chevrolet	150	225 (362.102)	1:34:04	143.515	
2003	July 12	99	Carl Edwards	Roush Racing	Ford	150	225 (362.102)	1:50:18	122.393	
2004	July 10	4	Bobby Hamilton	Bobby Hamilton Racing	Dodge	153*	229.5 (369.344)	1:52:19	122.6	
2005	July 9	46	Dennis Setzer	Morgan-Dollar Motorsports	Chevrolet	151*	226.5 (364.516)	1:55:25	117.747	
2006	July 8	33	Ron Hornaday Jr.	Kevin Harvick Incorporated	Chevrolet	150	225 (362.102)	1:54:18	118.11	
2007	July 14	5	Mike Skinner	Bill Davis Racing	Toyota	150	225 (362.102)	1:46:09	121.179	
2008	July 19	23	Johnny Benson Jr.	Bill Davis Racing	Toyota	150	225 (362.102)	1:57:50	114.592	
2009	July 18	33	Ron Hornaday Jr.	Kevin Harvick Incorporated	Chevrolet	150	225 (362.102)	1:50:43	121.933	
2010	Sept 3	30	Todd Bodine	Germain Racing	Toyota	150	225 (362.102)	1:43:22	130.603	
2011	Oct 1	2	Ron Hornaday Jr.*	Kevin Harvick Incorporated	Chevrolet	150	225 (362.102)	1:56:20	116.046	
2012	Sept 21	31	James Buescher	Turner Motorsports	Chevrolet	134	201 (323.478)	1:53:43	106.053	

- 2004 and 2005: Race extended due to a green–white–checkered finish.
- 2011: Ron Hornaday Jr.'s 50th NCWTS win.

==== Multiple winner (driver) ====
# Wins	Driver	Years won
3	Ron Hornaday Jr.	2006, 2009, 2011

==== Multiple winners (teams) ====
# Wins	Team	Years won
3	Kevin Harvick Incorporated	2006, 2009, 2011
2	Roush Racing	2000, 2003
2	Bill Davis Racing	2007, 2008

==== Manufacturer wins ====
# Wins	Make	Years won
6	(United States) Chevrolet	2002, 2005, 2006, 2009, 2011, 2012
3	(Japan) Toyota	2007, 2008, 2010
2	(United States) Ford	2000, 2003
2	(United States) Dodge	2001, 2004

== Buckle Up in Your Truck 225 ==
Buckle Up in Your Truck 225 presented by Click It or Ticket
- Corporate sponsor: Kentucky Transportation Cabinet
- First race: 2011
- Last race: 2020
- Distance: 225 miles (362 km)
- Laps: 150 (Stage 1: 35 Stage 2: 35 Stage 3: 80)
- Previous names: UNOH 225 (2011–2015)
- Most wins (driver): Kyle Busch (2)
- Most wins (team): Kyle Busch Motorsports (4)
- Most wins (manufacturer): Toyota (6)

The Buckle Up in Your Truck 225 presented by Click It or Ticket was a 225-mile (362 km) annual NASCAR Gander RV & Outdoors Truck Series race held at Kentucky Speedway in Sparta, Kentucky.

=== History ===
In the inaugural UNOH 225, which was held on July 7, 2011, Johnny Sauter won the pole position, but Kyle Busch won the race during a green–white–checkered finish. Busch started in the last position after missing the drivers meeting held earlier that day.

The race was removed from the NASCAR schedule in 2021. The final race in 2020 was shortened by lightning and won by Sheldon Creed; it was the eventual Truck champion's first career series win.

=== Past winners ===
Year	Date	No.	Driver	Team	Manufacturer	Race Distance		Race Time	Average Speed (mph)	Ref
Year	Date	No.	Driver	Team	Manufacturer	Laps	Miles (km)	Race Time	Average Speed (mph)	Ref
2011	July 7	18	Kyle Busch	Kyle Busch Motorsports	Toyota	152*	228 (366.93)	1:54:08	119.86	
2012	June 28	31	James Buescher	Turner Motorsports	Chevrolet	150	225 (362.102)	1:51:16	121.33	
2013	June 27	3	Ty Dillon	Richard Childress Racing	Chevrolet	150	225 (362.102)	1:45:50	127.559	
2014	June 26	51	Kyle Busch	Kyle Busch Motorsports	Toyota	150	225 (362.102)	1:43:05	130.962	
2015	July 9	88	Matt Crafton	ThorSport Racing	Toyota	145*	217.5 (350.032)	1:51:17	117.268	
2016	July 7	9	William Byron	Kyle Busch Motorsports	Toyota	150	225 (362.102)	1:55:41	116.698	
2017	July 6–7*	4	Christopher Bell	Kyle Busch Motorsports	Toyota	150	225 (362.102)	1:59:47	112.703	
2018	July 12	41	Ben Rhodes	ThorSport Racing	Ford	150	225 (362.102)	1:32:00	146.739	
2019	July 11	17	Tyler Ankrum	DGR-Crosley	Toyota	150	225 (362.102)	1:53:03	119.416	
2020	July 11*	2	Sheldon Creed	GMS Racing	Chevrolet	71*	106.5 (171.394)	1:05:14	97.956	

- 2011: This race was extended due to a NASCAR Overtime finish.
- 2015: The race was shortened due to damage to the catchfence from Ben Kennedy's wreck.
- 2017: Race started Thursday but ended shortly after midnight Friday due to a rain delay.
- 2020: Race moved from July 9 to July 11 due to schedule changes resulting from the COVID-19 pandemic. The race was shortened due to rain/lightning after the completion of Stage 2 at lap 70.

==== Multiple winners (drivers) ====
# Wins	Driver	Years won
2	Kyle Busch	2011, 2014

==== Multiple winners (teams) ====
# Wins	Team	Years won
4	Kyle Busch Motorsports	2011, 2014, 2016, 2017
2	ThorSport Racing	2015, 2018

==== Manufacturer wins ====
# Wins	Make	Years won
6	(Japan) Toyota	2011, 2014, 2015, 2016, 2017, 2019
3	(United States) Chevrolet	2012, 2013, 2020
1	(United States) Ford	2018

== See also ==
- Quaker State 400 (Kentucky)
- NASCAR Xfinity Series at Kentucky Speedway
- General Tire 150 (Kentucky)
