= NASCAR Cup Series at Auto Club Speedway =

Former NASCAR auto race at Auto Club Speedway

NASCAR Cup Series
- Venue: Auto Club Speedway
- Location: Fontana, California, United States

Circuit information
- Surface: Asphalt
- Length: 2.0 mi (3.2 km)
- Turns: 4

Stock car races in the NASCAR Cup Series have been held at Auto Club Speedway in Fontana, California since 1997.

A second race was held between 2004 and 2010.

== Spring race ==
Pala Casino 400
- Corporate sponsor: Pala Casino Resort and Spa
- First race: 1997
- Last race: 2023
- Distance: 400 miles (643.737 km)
- Laps: 200 (Stages 1/2: 60 each Final stage: 80)
- Previous names: California 500 Presented by NAPA (1997–1999); NAPA Auto Parts 500 (2000–2002); Auto Club 500 (2003–2010); Auto Club 400 (2011–2020); WISE Power 400 (2022)
- Most wins (driver): Kyle Busch (4)
- Most wins (team): Hendrick Motorsports (8)
- Most wins (manufacturer): Chevrolet (13)

The Pala Casino 400 was a 400-mile (643.737 km) NASCAR Cup Series stock car race held at the Auto Club Speedway in Fontana, California. It was the second race of the Cup Series season (after the Daytona 500) during its final years as well as from 2005 to 2010.

=== History ===
Prior to 2005, the race was held in late April or early May, and until 2010, the race was run at a length of 500 miles. When the NASCAR Realignment of 2005 was made, the race was moved to February and the week following the Daytona 500. The race was moved from February to March in 2011. After being pleased with the results of the shortening of the track's former fall race date, the Pepsi Max 400, from 500 to 400 miles, this race was also shortened to 400 miles in 2011.

The Automobile Club of Southern California, the title sponsor of the track, was the title sponsor of the race from 2003 to 2020. WillCo Intelligent Stored Energy (WISE) Power became the title sponsor of the race in 2022. The Pala Casino Resort and Spa became the title sponsor of the race in 2023.

=== Selected race summaries ===
- 1997: After nearly a decade, NASCAR came back to Southern California on June 22 with the inaugural California 500. The race featured 21 lead changes among a dozen different drivers. Jeff Gordon passed Mark Martin with 11 laps remaining and sped to victory. Terry Labonte took second, giving Hendrick Motorsports another 1–2 finish.
- 2000: Jeremy Mayfield scores a win for Penske Racing South, his second of his career. During the post-race celebration, Mayfield jumped on the roof of the car and dented it, leaving the car to be too short and penalizing Mayfield championship points. For a while following the incident, NASCAR prevented drivers from being on the roof of the car in the Victory Lane, although drivers were later allowed to jump on the roof during victory celebrations.
- 2001: On what would have been Dale Earnhardt's 50th birthday, the race was running with Rusty Wallace holding off Jeff Gordon at the end. During the celebration, Rusty had a 3 flag to fly around the track in the reverse direction. In 1993, Earnhardt and Wallace ran in reverse to hold Alan Kulwicki and Davey Allison flags at the last race in Atlanta that year. After Dale's death, Rusty was the last driver of that group of four drivers to race.
- 2002: There were ten drivers who failed to finish the race; with five of the drivers forcing to leave the race due to terminal crashes while five other drivers had engine issues. Nearly 10% of the 199-minute race was held under a caution flag and the average green flag run was approximately 38 laps. Dale Earnhardt Jr.'s unfortunate accident forced NASCAR to pass a regulation forcing drivers to take the ambulance ride to the infield care center every time they crashed; he did not admit to having this injury until mid-September, resulting in changes to NASCAR's concussion policy. In the end, Jimmie Johnson holds off Kurt Busch to score his first career win.
- 2008: The race started on Sunday, completing only 87 laps with 7 yellow flags and 2 red flags. One red flag was caused on lap 21 during the first day when Casey Mears spun upon hitting the water that had seeps up through cracks in the track, collided with Dale Earnhardt Jr., then got turned over on his roof by Sam Hornish Jr. NASCAR postponed the remainder of the event to Monday due to a lengthy red flag for rain. The rain delay on Sunday also delayed the Stater Brothers 300 to Monday. Carl Edwards would go on to win the event, while he finished 5th in the Nationwide Series race. The Cup Race was postponed at 2 AM ET on Monday and resumed at 1 PM ET the same day. The Nationwide Series Race was held shortly after 5 PM ET on Monday.
- 2013: Kyle Busch won after Joey Logano and Denny Hamlin crashed fighting hard for the lead on the last lap. Busch also took the weekend sweep by winning the Nationwide race the day before. It is the first Fontana victory in the NASCAR Cup Series both for Joe Gibbs Racing and Toyota. From 2011 to 2013, Busch finished a reverse order: 3rd (2011), 2nd (2012), and 1st (2013). The last lap crash between Logano and Hamlin sent Hamlin into the inside wall (without a SAFER Barrier) head-on. As a result, he suffered a compression fracture of his L1 vertebra in his back, which forced him to miss four races.
- 2014: Denny Hamlin missed the race when he came down with a sinus infection that impacted his vision about an hour before the race, necessitating Joe Gibbs Racing to hire Sam Hornish Jr. to drive the car. The race was marred by a massive rash of tire failures, with over 20 tire failures happening in the race itself. Multiple drivers, like Dale Earnhardt Jr., Kevin Harvick, Jimmie Johnson, Brad Keselowski, Marcos Ambrose, and more, fell victim to tire failures and had to work their way back through the field to salvage a lead lap finish. A spin by Clint Bowyer with two laps to go set up a dramatic green-white-checkered finish. Over the second-to-last lap, the field went five wide, with Kurt Busch leading. Over the last lap, Kyle Busch and Nationwide race winner Kyle Larson overtook Kurt for the lead. A side-by-side battle for the lead between Busch and Larson nicknamed the "Kyle and Kyle Show" unfolded. Larson looked like he was going to win his first Cup race, but Busch cleared and moved in front of Larson out of turn 4 and took his second straight win at Auto Club. There were a race-high 35 lead changes among 15 leaders.
- 2016: After a late-race caution, Jimmie Johnson pulls out of the crowd to hold of leaders Kevin Harvick, and Denny Hamlin to claim his 77th career win in the Superman car, passing Dale Earnhardt in career wins. Johnson would later win his 7th Championship, tying Earnhardt and Richard Petty in most career championships.
- 2019: Kyle Busch earns his 200th win after sweeping all 3 stages and coming back from a penalty on pit road, tying Richard Petty for the most NASCAR National Series wins.
- 2020: Following a pre-race tribute to Jimmie Johnson in his final race at Fontana, his Hendrick Motorsports teammate Alex Bowman leads a race-high 110 laps to earn his second career victory.
- 2022: The Cup Series returned to Fontana after a two-year absence. The race featured 12 cautions (a new track record) and 32 lead changes, the last being defending series champion Kyle Larson's pass of Daniel Suarez with three laps to go.

=== Past winners ===
Year	Date	No.	Driver	Team	Manufacturer	Race distance		Race time	Average speed (mph)	Report	Ref
Year	Date	No.	Driver	Team	Manufacturer	Laps	Miles (km)	Race time	Average speed (mph)	Report	Ref
1997	June 22	24	Jeff Gordon	Hendrick Motorsports	Chevrolet	250	500 (804.672)	3:13:32	155.012	Report	
1998	May 3	6	Mark Martin	Roush Racing	Ford	250	500 (804.672)	3:33:57	140.22	Report	
1999	May 2	24	Jeff Gordon	Hendrick Motorsports	Chevrolet	250	500 (804.672)	3:19:38	150.276	Report	
2000	April 30	12	Jeremy Mayfield	Penske Kranefuss Racing	Ford	250	500 (804.672)	3:20:50	149.378	Report	
2001	April 29	2	Rusty Wallace	Penske Racing	Ford	250	500 (804.672)	3:29:37	143.118	Report	
2002	April 28	48	Jimmie Johnson	Hendrick Motorsports	Chevrolet	250	500 (804.672)	3:19:53	150.088	Report	
2003	April 27	97	Kurt Busch	Roush Racing	Ford	250	500 (804.672)	3:34:07	140.111	Report	
2004	May 2	24	Jeff Gordon	Hendrick Motorsports	Chevrolet	250	500 (804.672)	3:38:33	137.268	Report	
2005	February 27	16	Greg Biffle	Roush Racing	Ford	250	500 (804.672)	3:34:45	139.697	Report	
2006	February 26	17	Matt Kenseth	Roush Racing	Ford	251*	502 (807.89)	3:23:43	147.852	Report	
2007	February 25	17	Matt Kenseth	Roush Fenway Racing	Ford	250	500 (804.672)	3:36:41	138.451	Report	
2008	Feb 24/25*	99	Carl Edwards	Roush Fenway Racing	Ford	250	500 (804.672)	3:46:04	132.704	Report	
2009	February 22	17	Matt Kenseth	Roush Fenway Racing	Ford	250	500 (804.672)	3:40:51	135.839	Report	
2010	February 21	48	Jimmie Johnson	Hendrick Motorsports	Chevrolet	250	500 (804.672)	3:31:24	141.911	Report	
2011*	March 27	29	Kevin Harvick	Richard Childress Racing	Chevrolet	200	400 (643.737)	2:39:06	150.849	Report	
2012	March 25	14	Tony Stewart	Stewart–Haas Racing	Chevrolet	129*	258 (415.21)	1:36:39	160.166	Report	
2013	March 24	18	Kyle Busch	Joe Gibbs Racing	Toyota	200	400 (643.737)	2:57:19	135.351	Report	
2014	March 23	18	Kyle Busch	Joe Gibbs Racing	Toyota	206*	412 (663.05)	3:05:53	132.987	Report	
2015	March 22	2	Brad Keselowski	Team Penske	Ford	209*	418 (672.706)	2:58:18	140.662	Report	
2016	March 20	48	Jimmie Johnson	Hendrick Motorsports	Chevrolet	205*	410 (659.831)	2:59:17	137.213	Report	
2017	March 26	42	Kyle Larson	Chip Ganassi Racing	Chevrolet	202*	404 (650.175)	2:57:46	136.359	Report	
2018	March 18	78	Martin Truex Jr.	Furniture Row Racing	Toyota	200	400 (643.737)	2:42:41	147.526	Report	
2019	March 17	18	Kyle Busch*	Joe Gibbs Racing	Toyota	200	400 (643.737)	2:47:42	143.113	Report	
2020	March 1	88	Alex Bowman	Hendrick Motorsports	Chevrolet	200	400 (643.737)	2:37:07	152.753	Report	
2021*	February 28	Race moved to the Daytona Road Course due to the COVID-19 pandemic.									
2022	February 27	5	Kyle Larson	Hendrick Motorsports	Chevrolet	200	400 (643.737)	3:03:07	114.222	Report	
2023	February 26	8	Kyle Busch	Richard Childress Racing	Chevrolet	200	400 (643.737)	3:08:05	127.603	Report	

=== Notes ===
- 2006, and 2014–2017: Race extended due to a NASCAR Overtime finish. The 2015 race took two attempts.
- 2008: The race started on Sunday but was finished on Monday due to rain.
- 2011: Race distance changed from 500 miles to 400. Kevin Harvick passed Jimmie Johnson on the last lap to win, the first final-lap pass in ACS history.
- 2012: Race shortened due to rain.
- 2021: Race canceled and moved to the Daytona road course (O'Reilly Auto Parts 253) due to the COVID-19 pandemic.

=== Multiple winners (drivers) ===
Wins	Driver	Years won
4	Kyle Busch	2013, 2014, 2019, 2023
3	Jeff Gordon	1997, 1999, 2004
3	Matt Kenseth	2006, 2007, 2009
3	Jimmie Johnson	2002, 2010, 2016
2	Kyle Larson	2017, 2022

=== Multiple winners (teams) ===
Wins	Team	Years won
8	Hendrick Motorsports	1997, 1999, 2002, 2004, 2010, 2016, 2020, 2022
7	Roush Fenway Racing	1998, 2003, 2005-2009
3	Team Penske	2000, 2001, 2015
3	Joe Gibbs Racing	2013, 2014, 2019
2	Richard Childress Racing	2011, 2023

==== Manufacturer wins ====
Wins	Manufacturer	Years won
12	Chevrolet	1997, 1999, 2002, 2004, 2010-2012, 2016, 2017, 2020, 2022, 2023
10	Ford	1998, 2000, 2001, 2003, 2005-2009, 2015
4	Toyota	2013, 2014, 2018, 2019

== Summer race ==
Pepsi Max 400
- Location: Fontana, California, United States
- Corporate sponsor: Pepsi Max
- First race: 2004
- Last race: 2010
- Distance: 400 miles (640 km)
- Laps: 200
- Previous names: Pop Secret 500 (2004); Sony HD 500 (2005–2006); Sharp AQUOS 500 (2007); Pepsi 500 (2008–2009); Pepsi Max 400 (2010)
- Most wins (driver): Jimmie Johnson (3)
- Most wins (team): Hendrick Motorsports (4)
- Most wins (manufacturer): Chevrolet (5)

The Pepsi Max 400 was a NASCAR Cup Series stock car race held annually at the Auto Club Speedway in Fontana, California. It was the second of two Sprint Cup Series races held at the Auto Club Speedway (the other being the Auto Club 500) and in 2009 and 2010 it was run in October as part of the Chase for the Sprint Cup.

=== History ===
The event was first held in 2004, added as part of the 2004 NASCAR Realignment, and was partially featured in the film, Herbie: Fully Loaded. From its inception until 2008 the race was run on Labor Day weekend, which was previously the traditional date of the Southern 500 at Darlington, and in the Inland Empire in the 1970s, the former California 500 United States Auto Club Marlboro Championship Trail race. The 2005 race was famous for Kyle Busch becoming the youngest NASCAR Cup Series winner ever (then known as the Nextel Cup Series).

As part of the 2009 realignment in NASCAR Auto Club Speedway, Talladega Superspeedway, and Atlanta Motor Speedway agreed to switch dates, with the Atlanta race moving from its traditional fall date to Labor Day weekend and becoming known as the Labor Day Classic 500. The realignment returned the Labor Day weekend race to the southern United States and gave California its first late season race since the final running of the Winston Western 500 at Riverside International Raceway in 1987. The AMP Energy 500 at Talladega moved into the race date vacated by Atlanta, with the Pepsi 500 moving into Talladega's former October date.

The Pepsi 500 name was used in August 2008, with Pepsi taking title sponsorship from Sharp. This announcement was made by the speedway's website, Pepsi has been the official soft drink sponsor of the speedway since 1997, before Auto Club Speedway became part of International Speedway Corporation, owner of several circuits on the NASCAR schedule. This was done despite ISC signing a contract with Coca-Cola to replace Pepsi as the official soft drink sponsor of its racetracks in 2008 (the contract is slowly being phased in).

NASCAR announced on January 13, 2010 that they would be shortened 100 miles. NASCAR then announced that, due largely to poor attendance, the 2010 running of this race would be the last as Auto Club Speedway returned to a single date on the Sprint Cup schedule as that race was exchanged to Kansas Speedway in 2011 marking a 2nd race date on June 5, 2011.

=== Past winners ===
Year	Date	No.	Driver	Team	Manufacturer	Race Distance		Race Time	Average Speed (mph)	Report	Ref
Year	Date	No.	Driver	Team	Manufacturer	Laps	Miles (km)	Race Time	Average Speed (mph)	Report	Ref
2004	September 5	38	Elliott Sadler	Robert Yates Racing	Ford	250	500 (804.672)	3:53:47	128.324	Report	
2005	September 4	5	Kyle Busch*	Hendrick Motorsports	Chevrolet	254*	508 (817.546)	3:43:32	136.356	Report	
2006	September 3	9	Kasey Kahne	Evernham Motorsports	Dodge	250	500 (804.672)	3:27:40	144.462	Report	
2007	September 2	48	Jimmie Johnson	Hendrick Motorsports	Chevrolet	250	500 (804.672)	3:48:08	131.502	Report	
2008	August 31	48	Jimmie Johnson	Hendrick Motorsports	Chevrolet	250	500 (804.672)	3:36:03	138.857	Report	
2009	October 11	48	Jimmie Johnson	Hendrick Motorsports	Chevrolet	250	500 (804.672)	3:28:28	143.908	Report	
2010*	October 10	14	Tony Stewart*	Stewart–Haas Racing	Chevrolet	200	400 (643.737)	3:01:53	131.953	Report	

- 2005: Race extended due to a green–white–checker finish. Kyle Busch became the youngest Cup Series race winner in 3½ years.
- 2010: First event to only be 400 miles/200 laps in length. Tony Stewart scored his first win at Auto Club Speedway in his 19th start at the track, leaving with only Darlington and Las Vegas as the tracks he has failed to win at along with Kentucky.

==== Multiple winners (drivers) ====
Wins	Driver	Years won
3	Jimmie Johnson	2007-2009

==== Multiple winners (teams) ====
Wins	Team	Years won
4	Hendrick Motorsports	2005, 2007-2009

==== Manufacturer wins ====
Wins	Manufacturer	Years won
5	Chevrolet	2005, 2007-2010
1	Ford	2004
1	Dodge	2006
