= 2008 Pepsi 500 =

Race details
- Race 25 of 36 in the 2008 NASCAR Sprint Cup Series
- 2008 Pepsi 500 program cover
- Date: August 31, 2008
- Location: Auto Club Speedway Fontana, California
- Course: Permanent racing facility
- Course length: 2.0 miles (3.23 km)
- Distance: 250 laps, 500 mi (804.672 km)
- Weather: Temperatures approaching an average of 76.9 °F (24.9 °C); wind speeds up to 15.9 miles per hour (25.6 km/h)
- Average speed: 138.857 miles per hour (223.469 km/h)

Pole position
| Driver | Jimmie Johnson | Hendrick Motorsports |
- Time: 39.912

Most laps led
| Driver | Jimmie Johnson | Hendrick Motorsports |
- Laps: 228

Winner
| No. 48 | Jimmie Johnson | Hendrick Motorsports |

Television in the United States
- Network: ESPN
- Announcers: Jerry Punch, Dale Jarrett and Andy Petree

The 2008 Pepsi 500 was the twenty-fifth race of the 2008 NASCAR Sprint Cup season and the next-to-last race to determine the twelve drivers to compete in the 2008 Chase for the Sprint Cup. The 500 miles (800 km) race was held on Sunday night, August 31 at Auto Club Speedway in Fontana, California. ESPN carried the race beginning at 7 PM US EDT and MRN along with Sirius Satellite Radio having radio coverage starting at 7:15 PM US EDT. This year marked the final time that this race would be run on Labor Day Weekend. In 2009, this race will move into the current spot occupied to Talladega Superspeedway as part of the NASCAR 2009 realignment.

== Pre-Race News ==
- Jeff Burton joined the NASCAR 500 Start club this week.
- In this week's edition of "The Worst Kept Secret in NASCAR", Joe Gibbs Racing officially announced August 25 that Joey Logano will officially take the place of the soon-to-be-departing Tony Stewart in the #20 Toyota for the 2009 season. Logano will debut in the series next week at Richmond driving the #02 car.
- Reed Sorenson will leave Chip Ganassi Racing and the #41 Dodge and become a driver for Gillett Evernham Motorsports in 2009. His car number and sponsors will be announced at a later date.

== Qualifying ==
Jimmie Johnson took the top position for the fourth time this season and 17th in his career, and A. J. Allmendinger closed fast to take the other front row spot, edging Johnson's Hendrick teammate, Jeff Gordon.

Failed to qualify: Tony Raines (#70).

== Race ==
A caution came out early in the race due to debris when one of the track's caution lights fell onto the track itself. Another caution came out on lap 43 when Kurt Busch spun due to tire tread separation on his left rear tire. The fourth caution came out when Joe Nemechek over corrected for over steer and hit the wall. The fifth caution came out around lap 102 due to debris on the track. The sixth caution on 160 was also due debris that was from a small piece of another caution light falling on the track. The seventh caution came out with 70 laps to go due to Robby Gordon spinning out. The eighth caution came out due to Marcos Ambrose's car hitting a wall, after which Jimmie Johnson won the race, leading 228 of 250 laps. Three drivers - Johnson, Dale Earnhardt Jr. and Jeff Burton - all locked up spots in the 2008 Chase for the Sprint Cup. Greg Biffle, who finished second, also all but wrapped up a spot in the Chase as well, and all he'll have to do is qualify his car and start in Richmond next week.

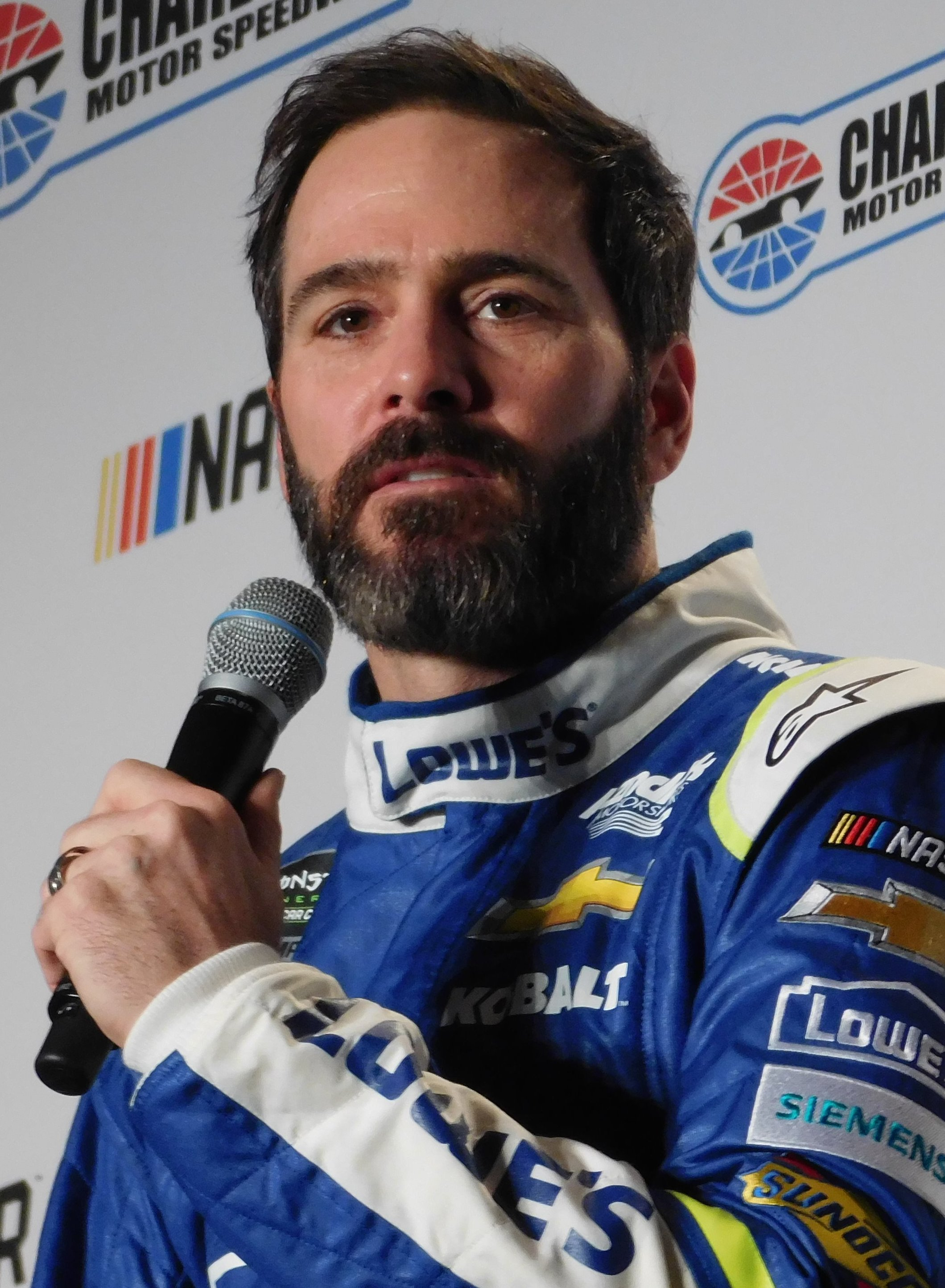
Jimmie Johnson won the race.

Polesitter Johnson dominated, leading 228 out of 250 laps to score his 36th victory at the venue where he scored his first just more than six years prior.

Post-race temperatures got as low as 61.9 °F (16.6 °C); a radical shift from the high temperatures witnessed prior to the race.

== Results ==
| POS | ST | # | DRIVER | SPONSOR / OWNER | CAR | LAPS | MONEY | STATUS | LED | PTS |
|---|---|---|---|---|---|---|---|---|---|---|
| 1 | 1 | 48 | Jimmie Johnson | Lowe's / Jimmie Johnson Foundation (Rick Hendrick) | Chevrolet | 250 | 314611 | running | 228 | 195 |
| 2 | 15 | 16 | Greg Biffle | 3M (Jack Roush) | Ford | 250 | 185375 | running | 12 | 175 |
| 3 | 21 | 11 | Denny Hamlin | FedEx Ground (Joe Gibbs) | Toyota | 250 | 178091 | running | 0 | 165 |
| 4 | 33 | 29 | Kevin Harvick | Shell / Pennzoil (Richard Childress) | Chevrolet | 250 | 170786 | running | 0 | 160 |
| 5 | 37 | 17 | Matt Kenseth | R&L Carriers (Jack Roush) | Ford | 250 | 169941 | running | 1 | 160 |
| 6 | 26 | 99 | Carl Edwards | Aflac (Jack Roush) | Ford | 250 | 153300 | running | 0 | 150 |
| 7 | 11 | 18 | Kyle Busch | M&M's (Joe Gibbs) | Toyota | 250 | 120225 | running | 0 | 146 |
| 8 | 4 | 9 | Kasey Kahne | Budweiser (Gillett Evernham Motorsports) | Dodge | 250 | 141691 | running | 0 | 142 |
| 9 | 12 | 44 | David Reutimann | UPS / Toys For Tots Literacy Program (Michael Waltrip) | Toyota | 250 | 108075 | running | 3 | 143 |
| 10 | 31 | 07 | Clint Bowyer | Jack Daniel's (Richard Childress) | Chevrolet | 250 | 120150 | running | 0 | 134 |
| 11 | 18 | 88 | Dale Earnhardt Jr. | AMP Energy / National Guard (Rick Hendrick) | Chevrolet | 250 | 108750 | running | 0 | 130 |
| 12 | 19 | 83 | Brian Vickers | Red Bull (Dietrich Mateschitz) | Toyota | 250 | 107825 | running | 0 | 127 |
| 13 | 22 | 6 | David Ragan | AAA Insurance (Jack Roush) | Ford | 250 | 108475 | running | 1 | 129 |
| 14 | 2 | 84 | A.J. Allmendinger | Red Bull (Dietrich Mateschitz) | Toyota | 250 | 98225 | running | 1 | 126 |
| 15 | 3 | 24 | Jeff Gordon | Pepsi / DuPont (Rick Hendrick) | Chevrolet | 250 | 143636 | running | 2 | 123 |
| 16 | 17 | 12 | Ryan Newman | Kodak (Roger Penske) | Dodge | 250 | 135225 | running | 0 | 115 |
| 17 | 27 | 31 | Jeff Burton | AT&T Mobility (Richard Childress) | Chevrolet | 250 | 137508 | running | 1 | 117 |
| 18 | 5 | 10 | Patrick Carpentier | Sears Auto Center / Valvoline (Gillett Evernham Motorsports) | Dodge | 250 | 96700 | running | 0 | 109 |
| 19 | 7 | 1 | Martin Truex Jr | Bass Pro Shops / Tracker Boats (Dale Earnhardt, Inc.) | Chevrolet | 250 | 125458 | running | 0 | 106 |
| 20 | 23 | 42 | Juan Pablo Montoya | Texaco / Havoline (Chip Ganassi) | Dodge | 250 | 124033 | running | 0 | 103 |
| 21 | 24 | 43 | Bobby Labonte | Cheerios / Betty Crocker / Totino's (Petty Enterprises) | Dodge | 250 | 130086 | running | 0 | 100 |
| 22 | 14 | 20 | Tony Stewart | Subway / Home Depot (Joe Gibbs) | Toyota | 250 | 137936 | running | 0 | 97 |
| 23 | 42 | 38 | David Gilliland | CitiFinancial (Yates Racing) | Ford | 249 | 111608 | running | 0 | 94 |
| 24 | 13 | 26 | Jamie McMurray | Crown Royal (Jack Roush) | Ford | 249 | 99725 | running | 0 | 91 |
| 25 | 39 | 66 | Scott Riggs | State Water Heaters (Gene Haas) | Chevrolet | 249 | 107958 | running | 0 | 88 |
| 26 | 16 | 5 | Casey Mears | Cheez-It / Carquest (Rick Hendrick) | Chevrolet | 249 | 105800 | running | 0 | 85 |
| 27 | 41 | 41 | Reed Sorenson | Target (Chip Ganassi) | Dodge | 249 | 117964 | running | 0 | 82 |
| 28 | 34 | 28 | Travis Kvapil | Hitachi "Inspire the Next" (Yates Racing) | Ford | 249 | 117739 | running | 0 | 79 |
| 29 | 8 | 22 | Dave Blaney | Caterpillar (Bill Davis) | Toyota | 249 | 104583 | running | 0 | 76 |
| 30 | 10 | 8 | Aric Almirola | U.S. Army (Dale Earnhardt, Inc.) | Chevrolet | 249 | 124533 | running | 0 | 73 |
| 31 | 32 | 77 | Sam Hornish Jr | Penske Truck Rental (Roger Penske) | Dodge | 249 | 132900 | running | 0 | 70 |
| 32 | 40 | 21 | Marcos Ambrose | Little Debbie (Wood Brothers) | Ford | 249 | 105595 | running | 0 | 67 |
| 33 | 30 | 55 | Michael Waltrip | NAPA Auto Parts (Michael Waltrip) | Toyota | 249 | 99808 | running | 1 | 69 |
| 34 | 6 | 19 | Elliott Sadler | McDonald's (Gillett Evernham Motorsports) | Dodge | 249 | 113495 | running | 0 | 61 |
| 35 | 35 | 00 | Mike Skinner | Affliction Clothing (Michael Waltrip) | Toyota | 249 | 96647 | running | 0 | 58 |
| 36 | 25 | 01 | Regan Smith | DEI / Principal Financial Group (Dale Earnhardt, Inc.) | Chevrolet | 249 | 95050 | running | 0 | 55 |
| 37 | 29 | 15 | Paul Menard | Menards / Johns Manville (Dale Earnhardt, Inc.) | Chevrolet | 249 | 95000 | running | 0 | 52 |
| 38 | 38 | 45 | Kyle Petty | Wells Fargo (Petty Enterprises) | Dodge | 249 | 86950 | running | 0 | 49 |
| 39 | 9 | 2 | Kurt Busch | Miller Lite (Roger Penske) | Dodge | 248 | 86900 | running | 0 | 46 |
| 40 | 36 | 7 | Robby Gordon | Monster Energy (Robby Gordon) | Dodge | 248 | 94850 | running | 0 | 43 |
| 41 | 28 | 96 | Ken Schrader | DLP HDTV (Jeff Moorad) | Toyota | 247 | 94805 | running | 0 | 40 |
| 42 | 43 | 08 | Johnny Sauter | FUBAR All Natural Drink (John Carter) | Dodge | 161 | 86740 | overheating | 0 | 37 |
| 43 | 20 | 78 | Joe Nemechek | Furniture Row / DenverMattress.com (Barney Visser) | Chevrolet | 67 | 86212 | crash | 0 | 34 |

| Previous race: 2008 Sharpie 500 | Sprint Cup Series; 2008 season | Next race: 2008 Chevy Rock & Roll 400 |
