= 1998 California 500 =

Race details
- Race 10 of 33 in the 1998 NASCAR Winston Cup Series season
- Date: May 3, 1998
- Official name: California 500
- Location: California Speedway, Fontana, California
- Course: Permanent racing facility
- Course length: 2.0 miles (3.23 km)
- Distance: 250 laps, 500 mi (804.672 km)
- Average speed: 140.22 miles per hour (225.66 km/h)

Pole position
Driver	Jeff Gordon	Hendrick Motorsports

Most laps led
Driver	Mark Martin	Roush Racing
- Laps: 165

Winner
No. 6	Mark Martin	Roush Racing

Television in the United States
- Network: ABC
- Announcers: Bob Jenkins, Benny Parsons and Ned Jarrett

The 1998 California 500 Presented by NAPA was a NASCAR Winston Cup Series race held on May 3, 1998, at California Speedway in Fontana, California. Contested over 250 laps on the 2-mile (3.2 km) speedway, it was the 10th race of the 1998 NASCAR Winston Cup Series season. Mark Martin of Roush Racing won the race.

== Background ==
The track, California Speedway, was a four-turn superspeedway that was 2 miles (3.2 km) long. The track's turns were banked from fourteen degrees, while the front stretch, the location of the finish line, was banked at eleven degrees. Unlike the front stretch, the backstraightaway was banked at three degrees.

=== Entry list ===
No	Driver	Team	Manufacturer
1	Darrell Waltrip	Dale Earnhardt, Inc.	Chevrolet
2	Rusty Wallace	Penske–Kranefuss Racing	Ford
3	Dale Earnhardt	Richard Childress Racing	Chevrolet
4	Bobby Hamilton	Morgan–McClure Motorsports	Chevrolet
5	Terry Labonte	Hendrick Motorsports	Chevrolet
6	Mark Martin	Roush Racing	Ford
7	Geoff Bodine	Mattei Motorsports	Ford
8	Hut Stricklin	Stavola Brothers Racing	Chevrolet
9	Lake Speed	Melling Racing	Ford
10	Ricky Rudd	Rudd Performance Motorsports	Ford
11	Brett Bodine	Brett Bodine Racing	Ford
12	Jeremy Mayfield	Penske–Kranefuss Racing	Ford
13	Jerry Nadeau	Elliott–Marino Racing	Ford
16	Ted Musgrave	Roush Racing	Ford
18	Bobby Labonte	Joe Gibbs Racing	Pontiac
19	Tony Raines	Roehrig Motorsports	Ford
21	Michael Waltrip	Wood Brothers Racing	Ford
22	Ward Burton	Bill Davis Racing	Pontiac
23	Jimmy Spencer	Travis Carter Enterprises	Ford
24	Jeff Gordon	Hendrick Motorsports	Chevrolet
26	Johnny Benson Jr.	Roush Racing	Ford
28	Kenny Irwin Jr.	Yates Racing	Ford
30	Derrike Cope	Bahari Racing	Pontiac
31	Mike Dillon	Richard Childress Racing	Chevrolet
33	Ken Schrader	Andy Petree Racing	Chevrolet
35	Wally Dallenbach Jr.	ISM Racing	Pontiac
36	Ernie Irvan	MB2 Motorsports	Pontiac
40	Sterling Marlin	Team SABCO	Chevrolet
41	Steve Grissom	Larry Hedrick Motorsports	Chevrolet
42	Joe Nemechek	Team SABCO	Chevrolet
43	John Andretti	Petty Enterprises	Pontiac
44	Kyle Petty	PE2 Motorsports	Pontiac
46	Morgan Shepherd	Team SABCO	Chevrolet
50	Randy LaJoie	Hendrick Motorsports	Chevrolet
71	Dave Marcis	Marcis Auto Racing	Chevrolet
75	Rick Mast	Butch Mock Motorsports	Ford
77	Robert Pressley	Jasper Motorsports	Ford
78	Gary Bradberry	Triad Motorsports	Ford
81	Kenny Wallace	FILMAR Racing	Ford
88	Dale Jarrett	Yates Racing	Ford
90	Dick Trickle	Donlavey Racing	Ford
91	Kevin Lepage	LJ Racing	Chevrolet
94	Bill Elliott	Elliott–Marino Racing	Ford
96	David Green	American Equipment Racing	Chevrolet
97	Chad Little	Roush Racing	Ford
98	Rich Bickle	Cale Yarborough Motorsports	Ford
99	Jeff Burton	Roush Racing	Ford

== Race results ==
Pos	Grid	No	Driver	Team	Manufacturer	Laps
1	3	6	Mark Martin	Roush Racing	Ford	250
2	2	12	Jeremy Mayfield	Penske–Kranefuss Racing	Ford	250
3	9	5	Terry Labonte	Hendrick Motorsports	Chevrolet	250
4	1	24	Jeff Gordon	Hendrick Motorsports	Chevrolet	250
5	11	1	Darrell Waltrip	Dale Earnhardt, Inc.	Chevrolet	250
6	40	97	Chad Little	Roush Racing	Ford	250
7	26	7	Geoff Bodine	Mattei Motorsports	Ford	250
8	5	26	Johnny Benson Jr.	Roush Racing	Ford	250
9	43	3	Dale Earnhardt	Richard Childress Racing	Chevrolet	250
10	21	99	Jeff Burton	Roush Racing	Ford	250
11	23	10	Ricky Rudd	Rudd Performance Motorsports	Ford	250
12	8	22	Ward Burton	Bill Davis Racing	Pontiac	250
13	22	36	Ernie Irvan	MB2 Motorsports	Pontiac	250
14	14	40	Sterling Marlin	Team SABCO	Chevrolet	250
15	15	33	Ken Schrader	Andy Petree Racing	Chevrolet	250
16	18	28	Kenny Irwin Jr.	Yates Racing	Ford	249
17	20	77	Robert Pressley	Jasper Motorsports	Ford	249
18	19	96	David Green	American Equipment Racing	Chevrolet	249
19	34	81	Kenny Wallace	FILMAR Racing	Ford	249
20	37	21	Michael Waltrip	Wood Brothers Racing	Ford	249
21	28	23	Jimmy Spencer	Travis Carter Enterprises	Ford	249
22	6	42	Joe Nemechek	Team SABCO	Chevrolet	248
23	35	78	Gary Bradberry	Triad Motorsports	Ford	247
24	10	46	Morgan Shepherd	Team SABCO	Chevrolet	247
25	30	75	Rick Mast	Butch Mock Motorsports	Ford	247
26	33	13	Jerry Nadeau	Elliott–Marino Racing	Ford	247
27	31	4	Bobby Hamilton	Morgan–McClure Motorsports	Chevrolet	246
28	38	11	Brett Bodine	Brett Bodine Racing	Ford	245
29	42	35	Wally Dallenbach Jr.	ISM Racing	Pontiac	245
30	41	41	Steve Grissom	Larry Hedrick Motorsports	Chevrolet	245
31	25	43	John Andretti	Petty Enterprises	Pontiac	244
32	16	9	Lake Speed	Melling Racing	Ford	243
33	24	16	Ted Musgrave	Roush Racing	Ford	243
34	4	2	Rusty Wallace	Penske–Kranefuss Racing	Ford	242
35	27	31	Mike Dillon	Richard Childress Racing	Chevrolet	239
36	39	50	Randy LaJoie	Hendrick Motorsports	Chevrolet	210
37	29	90	Dick Trickle	Donlavey Racing	Ford	193
38	7	18	Bobby Labonte	Joe Gibbs Racing	Pontiac	191
39	32	30	Derrike Cope	Bahari Racing	Pontiac	153
40	13	91	Kevin Lepage	LJ Racing	Chevrolet	93
41	36	88	Dale Jarrett	Yates Racing	Ford	86
42	17	44	Kyle Petty	PE2 Motorsports	Pontiac	85
43	12	94	Bill Elliott	Elliott–Marino Racing	Ford	84
Failed to Qualify
44	–	71	Dave Marcis	Marcis Auto Racing	Chevrolet	–
45	–	98	Rich Bickle	Cale Yarborough Motorsports	Ford	–
46	–	19	Tony Raines	Roehrig Motorsports	Ford	–
47	–	8	Hut Stricklin	Stavola Brothers Racing	Chevrolet	–
Race Results

== Race Statistics ==
- Time of race: 3:33:57
- Average Speed: 140.22 miles per hour (225.66 km/h)
- Pole Speed: 181.772 miles per hour (292.534 km/h)
- Cautions: 6 for 35 laps
- Margin of Victory: 1.287 sec
- Lead changes: 18
- Percent of race run under caution: 14%
- Average green flag run: 30.7 laps
