= 2003 Auto Club 500 =

Race details
- Race 10 of 36 in the 2003 NASCAR Winston Cup Series season
- Track map of the speedway at Auto Club Speedway AKA California Speedway
- Date: April 27, 2003
- Official name: Auto Club 500
- Location: California Speedway, Fontana, California
- Course: Permanent racing facility
- Course length: 2.0 miles (3.23 km)
- Distance: 250 laps, 500 mi (804.672 km)
- Average speed: 140.111 miles per hour (225.487 km/h)
- Attendance: 120,000

Pole position
| Driver | Steve Park | Dale Earnhardt, Inc. |

Most laps led
| Driver | Tony Stewart | Joe Gibbs Racing |
- Laps: 100

Winner
| No. 97 | Kurt Busch | Roush Racing |

Television in the United States
- Network: Fox Broadcasting Company
- Announcers: Mike Joy, Darrell Waltrip and Larry McReynolds

The 2003 Auto Club 500 was a NASCAR Winston Cup Series stock car race held on April 27, 2003, at California Speedway in Fontana, California. Contested over 250 laps on the 2-mile (3.23 km) asphalt D-shaped oval, it was the tenth race of the 2003 NASCAR Winston Cup Series season. Steve Park of DEI won the pole. Kurt Busch of Roush Racing won the race. This was also the last race for Jerry Nadeau. His career ended with an injury during practice at Richmond.

== Background ==
The track, California Speedway, was a four-turn superspeedway that was 2 miles (3.2 km) long. The track's turns were banked from fourteen degrees, while the front stretch, the location of the finish line, was banked at eleven degrees. Unlike the front stretch, the backstraightaway was banked at three degrees.

== Results ==
| Pos | No. | Driver | Team | Manufacturer | Laps | Laps led | Status |
|---|---|---|---|---|---|---|---|
| 1 | 97 | Kurt Busch | Roush Racing | Ford | 250 | 27 | Running |
| 2 | 18 | Bobby Labonte | Joe Gibbs Racing | Chevrolet | 250 | 11 | Running |
| 3 | 2 | Rusty Wallace | Penske Racing | Dodge | 250 | 54 | Running |
| 4 | 9 | Bill Elliott | Evernham Motorsports | Dodge | 250 | 12 | Running |
| 5 | 42 | Jamie McMurray | Chip Ganassi Racing | Dodge | 250 | 41 | Running |
| 6 | 8 | Dale Earnhardt Jr. | Dale Earnhardt, Inc. | Chevrolet | 250 | 0 | Running |
| 7 | 15 | Michael Waltrip | Dale Earnhardt, Inc. | Chevrolet | 250 | 0 | Running |
| 8 | 43 | John Andretti | Petty Enterprises | Dodge | 250 | 0 | Running |
| 9 | 17 | Matt Kenseth | Roush Racing | Ford | 250 | 2 | Running |
| 10 | 40 | Sterling Marlin | Chip Ganassi Racing | Dodge | 250 | 0 | Running |
| 11 | 24 | Jeff Gordon | Hendrick Motorsports | Chevrolet | 250 | 0 | Running |
| 12 | 5 | Terry Labonte | Hendrick Motorsports | Chevrolet | 250 | 0 | Running |
| 13 | 77 | Dave Blaney | Jasper Motorsports | Ford | 250 | 2 | Running |
| 14 | 01 | Jerry Nadeau | MB2 Motorsports | Pontiac | 250 | 0 | Running |
| 15 | 32 | Ricky Craven | PPI Motorsports | Pontiac | 250 | 1 | Running |
| 16 | 48 | Jimmie Johnson | Hendrick Motorsports | Chevrolet | 250 | 0 | Running |
| 17 | 6 | Mark Martin | Roush Racing | Ford | 249 | 0 | Running |
| 18 | 16 | Greg Biffle | Roush Racing | Ford | 249 | 0 | Running |
| 19 | 99 | Jeff Burton | Roush Racing | Ford | 249 | 0 | Running |
| 20 | 4 | Mike Skinner | Morgan–McClure Motorsports | Pontiac | 249 | 0 | Running |
| 21 | 22 | Ward Burton | Bill Davis Racing | Dodge | 249 | 0 | Running |
| 22 | 23 | Kenny Wallace | Bill Davis Racing | Dodge | 249 | 0 | Running |
| 23 | 38 | Elliott Sadler | Robert Yates Racing | Ford | 249 | 0 | Running |
| 24 | 21 | Ricky Rudd | Wood Brothers Racing | Ford | 249 | 0 | Running |
| 25 | 54 | Todd Bodine | BelCar Motorsports | Ford | 249 | 0 | Running |
| 26 | 30 | Jeff Green | Richard Childress Racing | Chevrolet | 249 | 0 | Running |
| 27 | 31 | Robby Gordon | Richard Childress Racing | Chevrolet | 249 | 0 | Running |
| 28 | 45 | Kyle Petty | Petty Enterprises | Dodge | 249 | 0 | Running |
| 29 | 29 | Kevin Harvick | Richard Childress Racing | Chevrolet | 248 | 0 | Running |
| 30 | 49 | Ken Schrader | BAM Racing | Dodge | 248 | 0 | Running |
| 31 | 74 | Tony Raines | BACE Motorsports | Chevrolet | 248 | 0 | Running |
| 32 | 25 | Joe Nemechek | Hendrick Motorsports | Chevrolet | 248 | 0 | Running |
| 33 | 7 | Jimmy Spencer | Ultra Motorsports | Dodge | 247 | 0 | Running |
| 34 | 41 | Casey Mears | Chip Ganassi Racing | Dodge | 247 | 0 | Running |
| 35 | 19 | Jeremy Mayfield | Evernham Motorsports | Dodge | 233 | 0 | Crash |
| 36 | 10 | Johnny Benson Jr. | MB2 Motorsports | Pontiac | 229 | 0 | Crash |
| 37 | 88 | Dale Jarrett | Robert Yates Racing | Ford | 228 | 0 | Crash |
| 38 | 14 | Larry Foyt | A. J. Foyt Enterprises | Dodge | 226 | 0 | Crash |
| 39 | 0 | Jack Sprague | Haas CNC Racing | Pontiac | 199 | 0 | Crash |
| 40 | 1 | Steve Park | Dale Earnhardt, Inc. | Chevrolet | 138 | 0 | Crash |
| 41 | 20 | Tony Stewart | Joe Gibbs Racing | Chevrolet | 128 | 100 | Engine |
| 42 | 12 | Ryan Newman | Penske Racing | Dodge | 34 | 0 | Crash |
| 43 | 37 | Derrike Cope | Quest Motor Racing | Chevrolet | 9 | 0 | Engine |

=== Failed to qualify ===
- Hideo Fukuyama (#66)
- Kerry Earnhardt (#83)

== Race statistics ==
- Time of race: 3:34:07
- Average speed: 140.111 mph (225.487 km/h)
- Pole speed: 186.838 mph (300.687 km/h)
- Cautions: 8 for 34 laps
- Margin of victory: 2.294 seconds
- Lead changes: 19
- Percent of race run under caution: 13.6%
- Average green flag run: 24 Laps

Lap leaders
| Laps | Leader |
|---|---|
| 1–12 | Bill Elliott |
| 13–92 | Tony Stewart |
| 93 | Ricky Craven |
| 94–95 | Dave Blaney |
| 96–114 | Tony Stewart |
| 115 | Jamie McMurray |
| 116 | Tony Stewart |
| 117–130 | Jamie McMurray |
| 131–145 | Kurt Busch |
| 146–156 | Jamie McMurray |
| 157–201 | Rusty Wallace |
| 202–204 | Jamie McMurray |
| 205–206 | Matt Kenseth |
| 207–215 | Rusty Wallace |
| 216 | Bobby Labonte |
| 217 | Jamie McMurray |
| 218–227 | Bobby Labonte |
| 228–238 | Jamie McMurray |
| 239–250 | Kurt Busch |

Total laps led
| Laps led | Driver |
|---|---|
| 100 | Tony Stewart |
| 54 | Rusty Wallace |
| 41 | Jamie McMurray |
| 27 | Kurt Busch |
| 12 | Bill Elliott |
| 11 | Bobby Labonte |
| 2 | Matt Kenseth |
| 2 | Dave Blaney |
| 1 | Ricky Craven |

Cautions: 8 for 34 laps
| Laps | Reason |
|---|---|
| 2–4 | #1 (Park) & #12 (Newman) accident backstraight |
| 9–11 | #0 (Sprague) accident turn 4 |
| 41–44 | #16 (Biffle) accident turn 4 |
| 130–134 | Oil on track |
| 156–159 | Debris frontstraight |
| 210–213 | #01 (Nadeau) & #32 (Craven) spin turn 4 |
| 220–223 | #01 (Nadeau) spin turn 2 |
| 231–237 | #88 (Jarrett), #10 (Benson), #19 (Mayfield), #14 (Foyt), #31 (R. Gordon), #25 (Nemechek), & #41 (Mears) accident turn 3 |
