= O'Reilly Auto Parts 253 =

NASCAR race

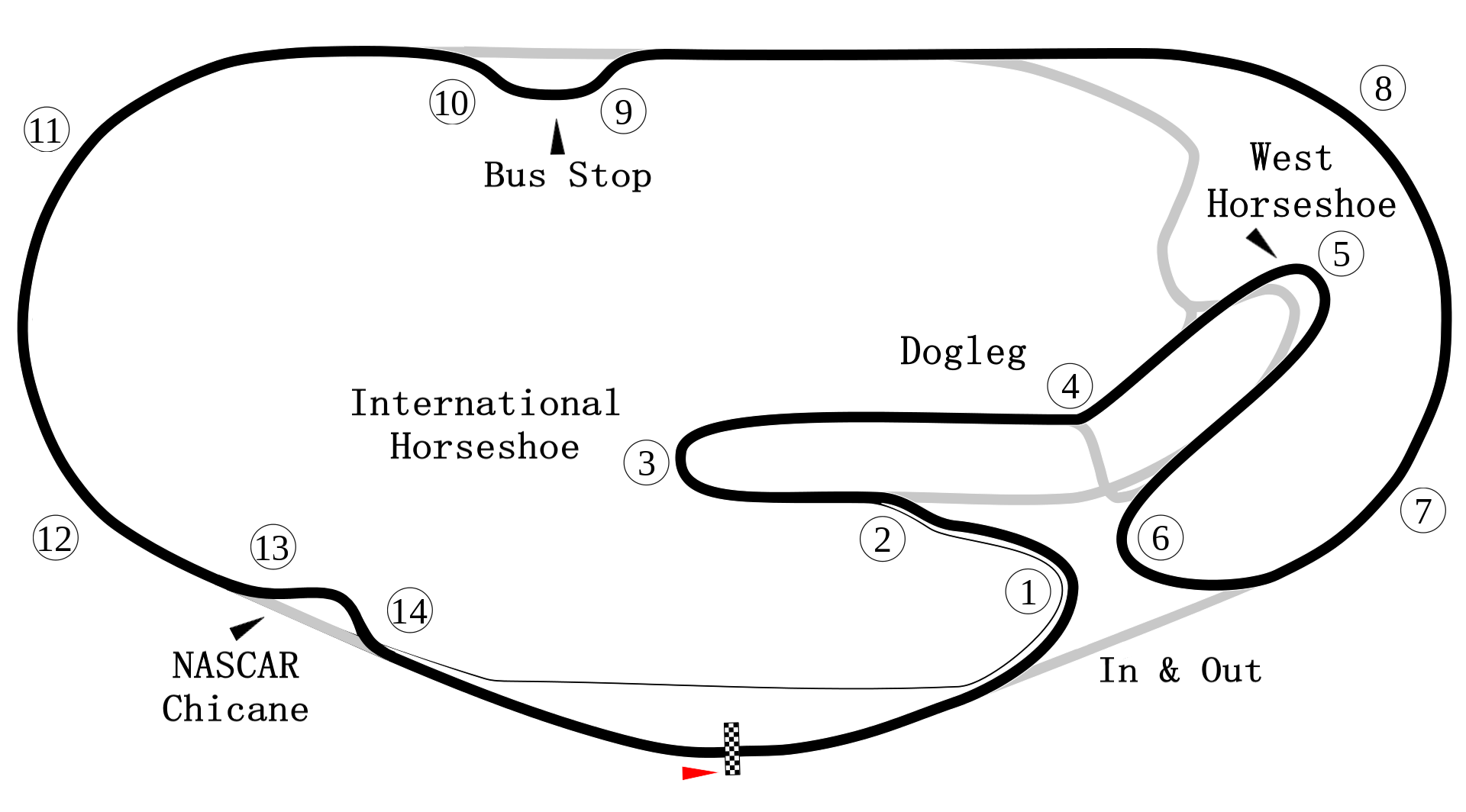

NASCAR Cup Series
- Venue: Daytona International Speedway
- Location: Daytona Beach, Florida
- Corporate sponsor: O'Reilly Auto Parts
- First race: 2020
- Last race: 2021
- Distance: 252.70 miles (406.68 km)
- Laps: 70; Stage 1: 16; Stage 2: 18; Final stage: 36
- Previous names: Go Bowling 235 (2020)
- Most wins (driver): Chase Elliott; Christopher Bell
- Most wins (team): Hendrick Motorsports; Joe Gibbs Racing
- Most wins (manufacturer): Chevrolet; Toyota

Circuit information
- Surface: Asphalt
- Length: 3.61 mi (5.81 km)
- Turns: 14

The O'Reilly Auto Parts 253 was a NASCAR Cup Series race on the Daytona International Speedway infield road course in Daytona Beach, Florida. Originally created in 2020 as a temporary event in response to races canceled by the COVID-19 pandemic, the race returned in 2021 for the same reason.

Christopher Bell is the most recent race winner. The race weekend included support events by the NASCAR Camping World Truck Series and NASCAR Xfinity Series, respectively called the BrakeBest Select 159 and Super Start Batteries 188.

== History ==
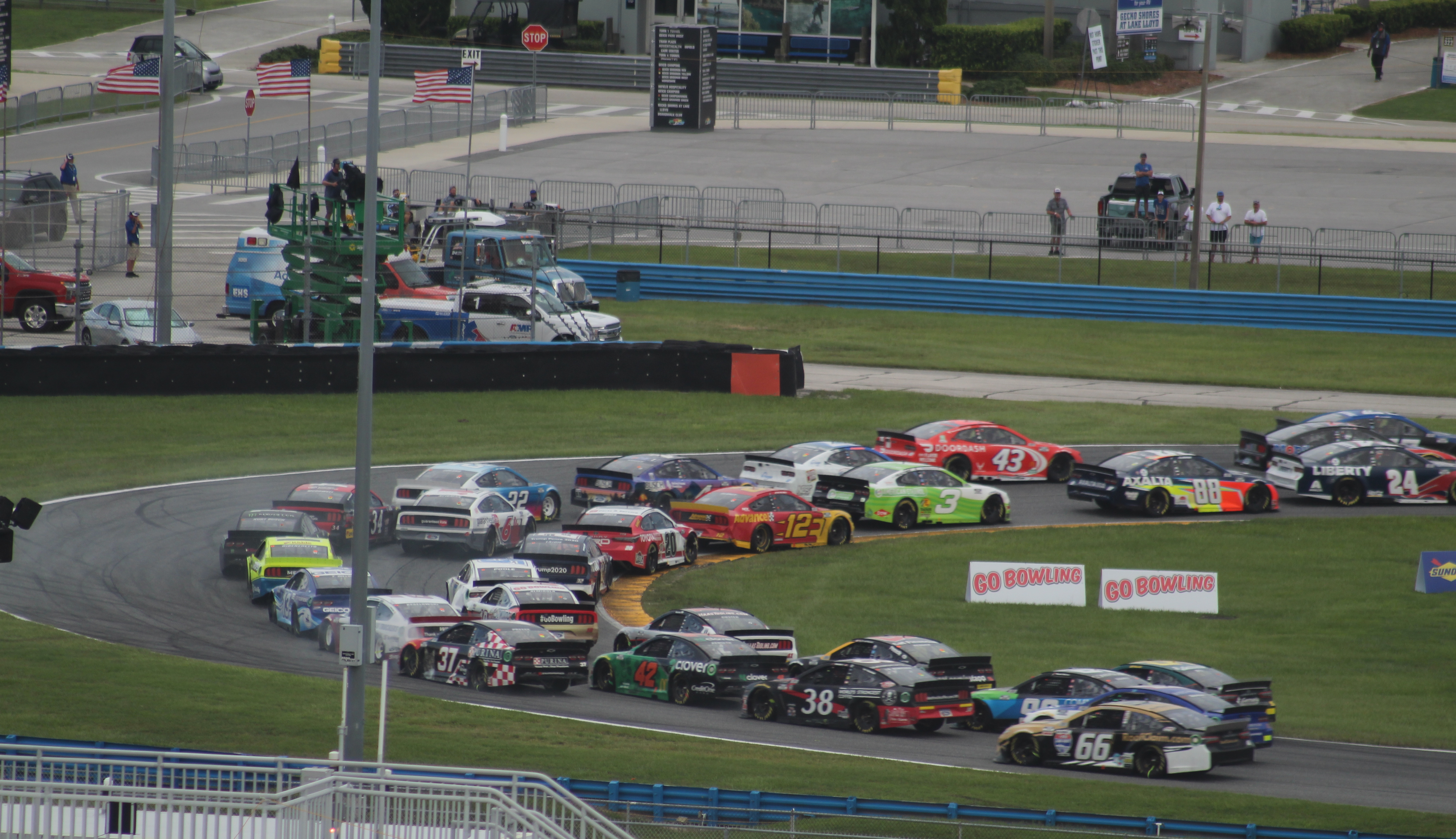
Cars file through the International Horseshoe on a restart in 2020.

The Daytona road course, which uses elements of the 2.5 mi (4.0 km) speedway oval, is commonly used for the 24 Hours of Daytona sports car race and Daytona 200 motorcycle race. In March 2020, NASCAR announced the Busch Clash exhibition race would begin using the road course instead of the oval in 2021.

The COVID-19 pandemic impacted much of the 2020 NASCAR schedule, resulting in races being postponed or canceled. In July, the August-planned Go Bowling at The Glen road course race at Watkins Glen International was called off due to New York's quarantine restrictions for out-of-state visitors. In response, NASCAR elected to move the Watkins Glen event to the Daytona road course, two weeks before the speedway was to host the Coke Zero Sugar 400. Watkins Glen race sponsor GoBowling.com transferred its sponsorship to the new race, and WGI's trophy maker Corning Museum of Glass produced a glass trophy for the event. While much of the road course layout remained the same as the sports car configuration, NASCAR added a chicane exiting the oval's turn four to allow cars to slow down entering the braking-heavy turn one.

Chase Elliott won the event in its inaugural 2020 running, which saw the speedway's grandstand capacity reduced to 10 percent for social distancing and a brief stoppage due to lightning part way through the event. Although intended to be a one-off race, the event returned in 2021 as the second race of the season after the Auto Club 400 at Auto Club Speedway was canceled for concerns stemming from COVID-19. The addition made the race the seventh road course date on the Cup schedule, the most in series history. The race was also extended to 70 laps in length. O'Reilly Auto Parts assumed naming rights for all three national series races, with the Cup date being renamed the O'Reilly Auto Parts 253.

== Past winners ==
Year	Day	Date	No.	Driver	Team	Manufacturer	Race distance		Race time	Average speed (mph)	Report	Ref
Year	Day	Date	No.	Driver	Team	Manufacturer	Laps	Miles (km)	Race time	Average speed (mph)	Report	Ref
2020	Sunday	August 16	9	Chase Elliott	Hendrick Motorsports	Chevrolet	65	234.7 (377.7)	2:37:30	89.39	Report	
2021	Sunday	February 21	20	Christopher Bell	Joe Gibbs Racing	Toyota	70	252.7 (406.7)	2:59:32	84.452	Report	

=== Manufacturer wins ===
# wins	Make	Years won
1	(United States) Chevrolet	2020
1	(Japan) Toyota	2021
