= History of NASCAR schedule realignments =

History of NASCAR schedule changes

History of NASCAR schedule realignments refers to changes in the schedule of the NASCAR Cup Series, NASCAR O'Reilly Auto Parts Series and NASCAR Craftsman Truck Series.

== First Cup schedule in 1949 ==
The first season in 1949 consists of 8 races, exclusively on dirt tracks. The season began on June, 19 at Charlotte Speedway, a 3/4-mile short track in the Charlotte area in North Carolina The second race took place on the first Sunday after Independence Day (July 10) at Daytona Beach, Florida. The third race was run at Occoneechee Speedway (Hillsboro, North Carolina) on the first Sunday in August. In September, there were three races, first at Langhorne Speedway in Pennsylvania, second at Hamburg Speedway in New York and third at Martinsville Speedway in Virginia. The last two races, one at Heidelberg Raceway near Pittsburgh, Pennsylvania, and one at North Wilkesboro Speedway in North Carolina, was run in October, with the last race run at Sunday the 16th.

== 1972 Changes ==
1972 was the first year of NASCAR's 'modern era'. All races for the Cup Series at ovals under 0.5 miles in length (and under 250 miles in distance), and dirt ovals, were removed from the schedule, that included popular tracks like Greenville-Pickens Speedway, Hickory Motor Speedway, and Columbia Speedway. Some of these venues were still used for races in NASCAR's second national series.

This resulted in the Cup schedule being reduced from 48 races, to 31, with all races now being run on the weekends to reduce exhausting travel for the teams and drivers, and to maximize attendance/viewership (with the exception of the Southern 500, which ran on Labor Day).

== 2003–2010 ==
=== 2003 announcement ===
In a January 2003 press conference, NASCAR's chairman of the board, Bill France Jr., caused a stir when he interrupted the conference to announce big changes for 2004. France said that many tracks were under fire and being looked at as having race dates taken from them, and given to other facilities. Among the scenarios being looked at by France were how tracks did with ticket sales, and how the weather affected those races. Two tracks immediately looked at by the media were the North Carolina Speedway and Darlington Raceway. Both tracks' events at the time almost never sold out, and the weather, especially at the North Carolina Speedway, had been a major problem, as rain forced many races to be postponed until the next day, typically Monday, which caused attendance to be even worse.

=== Realignment 2004 ===
"Realignment 2004" was announced in June 2003 at the Winston Cup race weekend at the Michigan International Speedway. While there were only a few changes, they were major. In June 1997, Auto Club Speedway began hosting a Winston Cup race. The track is located in Fontana, California, just outside Los Angeles, and so many fans flocked to the first race, and very quickly, the Los Angeles area became NASCAR's largest market. So, it was announced that Darlington's Southern 500, held on Labor Day weekend for 54 years, would be moved to November for 2004, alienating the fan base of long time NASCAR fans. In the process, Rockingham's November date, the Pop Secret Microwave Popcorn 400, would move to Fontana, become the Pop Secret 500, and be run from the late evening into the night on the West Coast on the day before Labor Day, while also being shown live on NBC in primetime. The move of the race to September left Rockingham with just one race to run in 2004: its February date, the Subway 400.

=== Realignment 2005 ===
"Realignment 2004" was unpopular with many, but unlike "realignment 2005", the previous realignment in the schedule was not tied in with a lawsuit. In April 1997 the Winston Cup Series began racing at the newly built Texas Motor Speedway in Fort Worth. Bruton Smith's Speedway Motorsports, Inc. (which also oversees operations of tracks in Bristol, Tennessee, Hampton, Georgia, Loudon, New Hampshire, and Concord, North Carolina, all of which have two race dates a year) thought that the first race at Texas was popular enough to warrant another date. Soon, the company began pressing NASCAR to give them another date, but NASCAR refused to grant the track a second race.

Early in the 2000s, SMI shareholder Francis Ferko filed a lawsuit against NASCAR, saying that it failed to come through on a promise to give Texas a second date. NASCAR denied making any promise of any kind. (Ferko filed the suit on his own; Smith did not want any part of the it.)

In May 2004, NASCAR announced that they and Texas Speedway had reached a settlement. As part of the settlement ISC sold North Carolina Speedway to SMI, who in turn gave the race to Texas. This not only cost Rockingham its Nextel Cup date, but left it with no dates in any of NASCAR's national racing series in 2005 (the track's remaining Busch Series date was removed, and at the time the track had never had a Truck series date). However, the loss of a NASCAR presence would ultimately prove a blessing in disguise for Rockingham; it is now one of the most heavily used venues for testing by NASCAR teams now that testing is prohibited at any track that hosts races in any NASCAR touring series.

The second track to lose a race was Darlington, whose slot in the Chase for the Nextel Cup was given to Texas. Darlington was then left with its spring date, which was moved to Mother's Day weekend (a traditional off-weekend for the Cup Series) and lengthened to 500 miles.

In addition to Texas gaining a second race, for the first time since its debut on the Cup schedule in 1988 Phoenix was granted a second date, this one in an early season slot following the spring race at Texas.

NASCAR also moved the Auto Club 500, the spring race at Fontana, into Rockingham's slot on the schedule (the race immediately following the Daytona 500.)

=== Realignment 2006–2007 ===
After its Cup Series realignment plans, NASCAR turned to its second national series, the Busch Series, for realignment in 2006. ISC purchased Pikes Peak International Raceway in Fountain, Colorado and immediately took its race from the Busch schedule, replacing it with an event at Martinsville Speedway.

As quickly as the race at Martinsville was added to the schedule, it was removed in favor of a race in Canada at Circuit Gilles Villeneuve, adding a third road course to the series schedule.

The Nextel Cup Series schedule was left untouched during this time.

==== Reasons for Rockingham and Darlington losing their races ====
NASCAR has stated that Rockingham and Darlington lost their dates because they were not selling all the tickets for those events, and that giving Darlington only one date would make a sellout more likely since it would be the only race taking place there the following year.

Also, races at both tracks had been affected by rain many times over the past few years. Even if there was no rain, it was usually overcast. Darlington's only race taking place in May also put the scheduling of the race in the peak tornado season in the Southeast.

However, Darlington's future seems secure, with a total sellout for the lone race from 2005 through 2008, and with many major projects being planned or done at the speedway. Due to the sellouts the track owners have considered adding more seats.

=== Realignment 2009–10 ===
The 2009 season, announced on August 19, 2008, went under a realignment once again after a long break. The fall race at Talladega Superspeedway was moved to a later date on the schedule around Halloween (the first Sunday in November or the final Sunday in October), one previously occupied by Atlanta Motor Speedway's fall event. That race was moved to Labor Day weekend, where California Speedway's inherited autumn event from Darlington had been, and that date was switched to Talladega's old date on the first weekend of October. In addition, the Nationwide Series dropped Mexico City's road course race for a new race in August at the .875 miles (1.408 km) Iowa Speedway, and moved the Montreal event to an open weekend on the Sprint Cup schedule (August 30) with their lone Atlanta race moving to the Labor Day weekend from March. The Camping World Truck Series replaced the spring Milwaukee Mile race with a race at Iowa Speedway to be run on August 26, and also replaced the Memorial Day weekend race at Mansfield Motorsports Park with a race later in the season at Pocono Raceway for the first time in the series' history. In 2010, the NCWTS also got rid of its second race at Auto Club Speedway. This moved all races back one weekend in the season until the first weekend of August, where a race was added at Darlington Raceway, which was put in place after an absence on the series' schedule in the previous season. Other changes included a race at Kentucky Speedway being moved from the summer to the fall.

== 2011–2019 ==
=== Realignment 2011 ===
Major schedule changes were announced to combat poor attendance and poor television ratings, both of which had dropped considerably since the introduction of the Generation-5 car and for other reasons.

==== Cup Series ====
- Atlanta Motor Speedway's spring date was discontinued in favor of the Labor Day weekend date.
- Kentucky Speedway hosted its first Sprint Cup Series race, the Quaker State 400, with room being made for it by dropping the spring Atlanta race. The formal announcement was made on August 10, 2010, and the race took the LifeLock.com 400 slot held by Chicagoland Speedway.
- Chicagoland became the opening race to the 2011 Chase for the Sprint Cup.
- New Hampshire Motor Speedway hosted the second race in the Chase for the Sprint Cup, as the Sylvania 300 was moved back one week due to Chicagoland gaining the opening Chase race.
- Kansas Speedway gained a spring race date. The race was run in early June immediately following the Coca-Cola 600.
- Auto Club Speedway lost its fall race and Chase for the Sprint Cup date, the Pepsi Max 400. The spring race, the Auto Club 500, was moved from February to March and shortened to 400 miles/200 laps.
- The spring race at Texas Motor Speedway was run on Saturday night, after having been a Sunday afternoon race.
- The Subway Fresh Fit 600 at Phoenix International Raceway was moved to the second week of the season and returned to its previous distance, and is run during the day for the first time (the awarding of the second race date to Phoenix coincided with the installation of lights at the track and resulted in the race being run at night from its debut).
- Dover International Speedway maintained both of its Sprint Cup weekends and with the move of Chicagoland to the Chase, Dover's Chase race moved back one week.

In addition to these developments, Las Vegas Motor Speedway bid for a second date for its track and failed to get it. Track management and ownership want to move the final races of the year from Homestead–Miami Speedway (NASCAR Championship Weekend) to Las Vegas as all three of the major series now hold their end-of-season awards banquets there.

==== Nationwide Series ====
- Nashville Superspeedway's second date moved to late July and replaced the date held by Gateway International Raceway, which was closed by track owner Dover Motorsports following the 2010 racing season.
- Chicagoland Speedway gained a second Nationwide Series date, run on June 4.
- Iowa Speedway gained a second Nationwide Series date, run on May 22.
- Michigan International Speedway's date moved to the weekend of the June Sprint Cup race.
- Circuit Gilles Villeneuve's date moved to the weekend of the August Sprint Cup race at Michigan.
- Auto Club Speedway's fall date was removed from the schedule and not replaced by another track, condensing the schedule from 35 races in 2010 to 34 races in 2011.

==== Truck Series ====
- Phoenix International Raceway's truck series date, which had been run near the end of the season for years, moved to February as part of the realignment of the Cup Series race.
- Darlington Raceway's truck series date, which was run in August in 2010, moved to March.
- Kentucky Speedway gained a second truck series date, to be run on the same weekend as the July Nationwide Series event, and the track's inaugural Cup race in early July. The track now hosts a triple header weekend, and the second race was moved to October.
- Kansas Speedway's date moved to June as part of the Sprint Cup Series weekend.
- Michigan International Speedway's date moved to the weekend of the August Sprint Cup race.

Although Atlanta has had major attendance issues in recent years, with less than 100,000 fans at the last two Kobalt Tools 500 races, its new Labor Day weekend race in 2009 was a huge success.

Kentucky Speedway has demanded a race for years, with its owners selling the track to Speedway Motorsports, Inc. and filing a lawsuit (which was dismissed) in efforts to get a Sprint Cup Series race. Improvements had to be made but were expected to be completed in time.

Chicagoland has had major attendance issues and its TV ratings have been some of the lowest of the season in recent years. NASCAR is hoping to save the race in a major market by moving it to the Chase. Some were worried about a conflict with the IndyCar Series, which had its race there during the Labor Day weekend. However, IndyCar officials did schedule realignment of their own eliminating the conflict altogether.

Kansas has also demanded a second race for years especially since the building of a casino near the track. Despite the closure of Nashville Superspeedway, which is owned by Dover International Speedway, Dover maintained two race dates.

Since the addition of the second race at Auto Club Speedway, attendance for both races has dropped considerably, even with a Chase race. Because NASCAR scheduled the first race at the track to immediately follow the Daytona 500 on the schedule, teams were forced to travel across the continent for the second week, hurting them financially and eventually leading to the discontinuation of the truck race there in 2010. The February race was also inconveniently scheduled on the same night as the Academy Awards ceremony (except in 2006 and 2010, when the ceremony was rescheduled to avoid conflict with the Winter Olympics), preventing major stars from appearing at the race. By returning the race to April, officials are once again hoping for a sellout.

Martinsville Speedway has also had attendance issues. However, it maintained two dates for 2011.

=== Realignment 2012–2014 ===
NASCAR announced on September 29, 2011, that some schedule realigning would take place for the 2012 season. Although the realignment was not as drastic as past years, both of the Kansas races were affected. The spring race, which was added to the schedule for the 2011 campaign, was moved from June to April, and the spring race at Dover International Speedway returned to its traditional early June date. Kansas's fall race, a part of the Chase for the Cup, was switched with Talladega's Chase date and moved to late October. NASCAR said this realignment was due to a repaving project at the track which was scheduled to begin following the race.

In addition, the race at Kentucky Speedway moved to June preceding the Coke Zero 400 at Daytona International Speedway.

Rockingham returned to NASCAR as part of the Truck Series and K&N Pro Series.

The 2013 realignment did not see any significant changes, other than switching back the Talladega and Kansas Chase races to their original dates.

The 2014 realignment also had few changes. The dates were swapped for the spring races at Darlington and Kansas, turning Kansas's spring race into a night race. The spring race at Texas Motor Speedway was moved from Saturday night to Sunday afternoon so as not to interfere with the NCAA Men's Tournament, which began the same weekend in nearby AT&T Stadium. Texas and Martinsville were moved up a week. The Darlington date moved to Texas's original spot on the schedule. The Easter off-week moved to Kansas's original date.

=== Realignment 2015 ===
The 2015 alignment saw several drastic changes:

- Once again, Darlington was moved, this time returning to its original Labor Day weekend for the first time in 12 years.
- The Food City 500, Bristol's spring race, was moved to Darlington's 2014 position on the schedule, in hopes of running it in warmer weather conditions as opposed to the cold and sometimes rainy conditions that had plagued the mid-March date.
- Atlanta's race was moved to the post-Daytona 500 date.
- The spring Phoenix race was moved to what had been Bristol's spring date. Because Las Vegas and Auto Club stayed in their original positions, the series now had an uninterrupted streak of three races on the West Coast, nicknamed the "West Coast swing". This was done not only to please the fans, but it also meant that drivers and their teams would not have to make as many cross-country treks back to their shops in Charlotte.
- The off-weeks were relocated: the traditional Easter off-weekend now fell between Martinsville and Texas, and the summer off-week that originally took place between New Hampshire and the Brickyard 400 was repositioned to the week between Michigan's Quicken Loans 400 and Sonoma's Toyota/Save Mart 350.
- Sonoma took Kentucky's original date, and Kentucky took New Hampshire's July date. New Hampshire's summer date was moved to the original summer off-weekend. Due to 2015 being the first year of a new broadcasting contract between NASCAR, Fox and NBC, these changes to the summer schedule were done so that both networks started their coverage of the NASCAR season with a Daytona race, with FOX getting the Daytona 500 and NBC getting the Coke Zero 400. Additionally, for 2015 only, the Coke Zero 400 was run as a Sunday night race, since July 4 was on a Saturday when many NBC affiliate networks broadcast fireworks displays.
- The season also received an additional off-weekend on the weekend prior to Labor Day weekend, making the regular season 40 weeks long (with three off-weekends and the off-weekend for the All-Star race).
- The Chase dates at Charlotte and Kansas were flipped, with Charlotte becoming the opening race in the Contender Round of the Chase.

=== Realignment 2016 ===
The 2016 alignment saw some changes to the schedule

- The Easter off-week is placed late-March between Fontana and Martinsville.
- The Coke Zero 400 at Daytona will return to its usual Saturday night date.
- Michigan and Bristol swap their August race dates.
- The third off-week was moved to mid-August between Watkins Glen and Bristol, instead of the late-August break between Bristol and Darlington. This was done to avoid a scheduling conflict with the 2016 Summer Olympics being hosted on NBC. The aforementioned Olympics conflict forced the race at Watkins Glen to be moved to USA Network
- The first race at Dover and the Memorial Day week swapped dates, so the last race before the All-Star Race was Dover instead of Kansas, because of Memorial Day being very late similar to 2011.

=== Realignment 2017 ===
The final calendar for the 2017 season was released on May 5, 2016.

Key changes from 2016 include:

- The Daytona 500 was moved back a week.
- The Texas spring race was moved from Saturday night to Sunday afternoon.
- Dover's spring race was moved back to the slot between the Coca-Cola 600 and the June Pocono race.
- Bristol and Michigan swapped back their August race dates.
- Talladega and Kansas swapped their October race dates, making Talladega the second race in the Round of 12 and turning Kansas into an elimination race.
- The summer off week moves back between Bristol and Darlington.
- The start times for several races, including the Daytona 500, were adjusted so as to have the event end during primetime.

=== Realignment 2018 ===
The 2018 Cup Series season schedule was released on May 23, 2017, and saw some notable changes, which were how:

- The Advance Auto Parts Clash was moved back to Sunday afternoon (a week before the Daytona 500 after being held on the Saturday night before that for many years.
- The 60th running of the Daytona 500 would be moved one week earlier to be held on Presidents' Day weekend (in 2018, falling on Sunday, February 18), how it was until after 2011 and many years before that.
- Dover International Speedway's spring race, was moved one month early to precede the KC Masterpiece 400 at Kansas Speedway and the Coca-Cola 600 at Charlotte Motor Speedway.
- There was an additional off-week for the Cup Series in the schedule for 2018 on the Father's Day weekend. That provided some flexibility for Fox so they could broadcast the U.S. Open and the 2018 FIFA World Cup. The other off weekends remained being on Easter weekend (as it always has been) and in late-summer between the Bristol night race and the race at Darlington on Labor Day weekend.
- The race at Chicagoland was moved off of the playoffs and back to early in the summertime before the Coke Zero Sugar 400 (how it was like until after 2010). This change resulted in NBC's portion of the TV schedule beginning at Chicago and not Daytona.
- The Brickyard 400 at Indianapolis Motor Speedway moved to September to become the final race of the regular season after years of being in late July or early August.
- New Hampshire Motor Speedway's fall race was eliminated and replaced with a new second race at Las Vegas Motor Speedway, the South Point 400, replaced on the schedule and will be the playoffs opener.
- The Federated Auto Parts 400 at Richmond Raceway moved from being the final race of the regular season to the second race in the playoffs, replacing the New Hampshire/Las Vegas race, which was bumped back a week to become the first race of the playoffs.
- Charlotte Motor Speedway's fall race moved a week earlier into late September from early October and for the first time utilized the track's road course layout instead of its quad-oval, becoming the Bank of America Roval 400, and it also became the closing race to the Round of 16 in the playoffs.
- The fall race at Dover was moved one week later in the season to become the first race of the Round of 12 in the playoffs, flip-flopping places with Charlotte.

== 2020 – Present ==
=== Realignment 2020 ===
==== Cup Series ====
The 2020 schedule for the NASCAR Cup Series will undergo a series of significant changes.

- The Folds of Honor QuikTrip 500 at Atlanta Motor Speedway will move behind the West Coast swing to March 15, 2020, returning to its pre-2010 date of mid-March.
- The race at Homestead–Miami Speedway will no longer serve as the final race of the season ending a tradition that dated back to 2002 and bringing an end to Ford Championship Weekend. The race date will move to March 22, 2020, following the race at Atlanta, and become known as the Dixie Vodka 400.
- After 21 years of being NASCAR's Fourth of July weekend event (and 60 of 61 years overall), the Coke Zero Sugar 400 at Daytona International Speedway will move to August and become the final race of NASCAR's "regular season". The Brickyard 400, run at Indianapolis Motor Speedway, will switch race weekends with Daytona.
- The Blu-Emu Maximum Pain Relief 500 at Martinsville Speedway will be run under the lights for the first time on May 9, Mother's Day Weekend.
- Kansas Speedway's spring race, the Super Start Batteries 400 that has been run under the lights on Mother's Day Weekend will move from Saturday night to Sunday afternoon and be held on May 31, 2020, after the Coca-Cola 600.
- Both events at Pocono Raceway will be run on consecutive days the weekend of June 27–28.
- Dover International Speedway's second date moves to late August, marking the first time the race has not been in NASCAR's postseason.
- The Southern 500 at Darlington Raceway and the Bass Pro Shops NRA Night Race at Bristol Motor Speedway will both become Playoff races in place of Dover and Homestead. This will mark the first time since the inaugural Chase for the NEXTEL Cup in 2004 that Darlington will host a postseason event (that race was given to Texas in the Ferko lawsuit in 2005) and the first postseason race of any kind for Bristol.
- The Championship Round of the Playoffs will be conducted at Phoenix Raceway on November 8. This will be the first Phoenix race to close out the season. Due to this and the consolidation of the Pocono doubleheader, the 2020 season will actually end one week earlier than in the past. Usually the season finale is held on third weekend in November. Those dates being anywhere from November 16 to November 22.
- The Toyota Owners 400 at Richmond will move back to Sunday afternoon, similar to 2015-2017 when it was run on a Sunday afternoon. This was done because the two Martinsville Speedway races will be night races in 2020, as both races will start in the day and end at night.
- There will be two off weeks between Loudon and Michigan to accommodate the NBC networks coverage of the 2020 Summer Olympics, meaning the off week for the U.S. Open Golf Championship that Fox instituted will be removed. This prevents a conflict that happened at the 2016 Olympics, when NBC moved the Watkins Glen race to their USA Network. NBC's half starts on the weekend of that golf championship.

==== Xfinity Series ====
- Atlanta will no longer be the second race of the season and moves a month later to become the fifth race of the season, and also the first race after the West Coast swing.
- The order of races in the West Coast swing changes, with the series now going to Auto Club Speedway (Fontana) before Phoenix Raceway (Phoenix) instead of the other way around as it had been in the past. Because there will be no race in between Daytona and the West Coast swing, Las Vegas will now be the second race of the season (instead of the third) and the flip-flop of California and Phoenix will be the third and fourth races. (Phoenix had been the fourth race previously and now is still the fourth race after this switch.)
- After being the season-finale for the Xfinity Series since 1995 and all three national series since 2002, Homestead–Miami Speedway lost its place as the last race of the season and will instead have its race in March between Atlanta and Texas on a weekend that had previously been an off weekend which will now be in April the week after Bristol.
- After previously having two races on the schedule, Richmond lost its spring date in favor of a race at Martinsville in October, which marks the series' first trip to the track in 14 years, when it hosted a race for one year in 2006 (in between when the series stopped going to Pikes Peak after 2005 and started going to Montreal in 2007). The race at Martinsville in October will be the second-to-last race of the season and the last race of the Round of 8 in the playoffs.
- After being held sometime in August every year it has been on the schedule, Mid-Ohio moves earlier in the season to become the first race held after Charlotte on Memorial Day weekend, replacing Pocono.
- Pocono's race will be held on the last week of June, replacing Chicagoland. The race will be held on a Sunday afternoon instead of Saturday afternoon as part of the new "doubleheader-weekend" where the Cup Series will run both of their races at the track on the same weekend on consecutive days (on Saturday in addition to the Truck Series and Sunday in addition to the Xfinity Series).
- Chicago's race moves a week earlier than it was in 2019. It now falls on Father's Day weekend, which had previously been an off-weekend for the series, and that off-weekend was moved to July after the race at New Hampshire.
- After having hosted a night race on the Fourth of July weekend since 2002 in the Xfinity Series, Daytona's summer race will now be in August, trading places with Indianapolis.
- Iowa's second race moves back a week, on the weekend where Watkins Glen had been.
- After Mid-Ohio's race moved back to late May/early June, Road America's race moved into that weekend in August from where it had been previously later in the month.
- Watkins Glen moved two weeks later in place of the Bristol Night Race, which will now be a month later and part of the playoffs.
- Dover’s second race was knocked out of the playoffs and into the regular seasons as a result of Bristol being put in. That race at Dover will now be held on August 22 (the weekend where Road America had been).
- Since Labor Day falls later in the year in 2020, the race at Daytona (Indy in 2019) will now be held before Darlington instead of after so Darlington can remain on Labor Day weekend.
- The race at Richmond will now be earlier in September and become the last race before the start of the playoffs based on how the schedule works and Las Vegas Motor Speedway moves later in the month and into the playoffs.
- The Charlotte Roval race is now later in the fall and in October instead of September.
- After being the second-to-last race of the season for many years, Phoenix Raceway (Phoenix) will be the last race of the season after Homestead was bumped back to March. However, because of how the schedule works (only one off-weekend in the playoffs instead of two), it will remain on the same weekend in early November, and the season will end a week earlier than in the past.

Additionally, because of the schedule changes, Homestead and Mid-Ohio will now be Fox races and Pocono as well as the new Martinsville race will be NBC races. It will be the first time Fox has ever broadcast a NASCAR Xfinity race at Homestead. Mid-Ohio will mark Fox's first broadcast of a road course race in the Xfinity Series since Mexico City in 2006 (which was under the old 2001-2006 TV contract).

==== Truck Series ====
- After being the season-finale for the Truck Series since 2002, Homestead–Miami Speedway lost its place as the last race of the season and will instead have its race in March between Atlanta and Texas
- The Truck Series will return to Richmond Raceway for the first time since 2005
- Michigan International Speedway will serve as the final race of the regular season
- World Wide Technology Raceway at Gateway will host the Playoff opener for the Gander Trucks
- The Round of 10 will end at Bristol Motor Speedway
- The Round of 8 will end at Martinsville Speedway
- The Championship Round of the Playoffs will be conducted at Phoenix Raceway on November 6. This will be the first Phoenix race to close out the season

=== 2020 coronavirus pandemic changes ===
==== Cup Series ====
- The Folds of Honor QuikTrip 500 at Atlanta Motor Speedway and the Dixie Vodka 400 at Homestead–Miami Speedway were originally announced on March 12, 2020, due to the COVID-19 pandemic to take place without fans in attendance, but one day later on March 13, 2020, NASCAR announced that the two Cup races (including support races) would be postponed.
- On March 16, 2020, NASCAR announced all race events through May 3 have been postponed due to the coronavirus (COVID-19) pandemic.
- On April 17, 2020, NASCAR announced that Martinsville Speedway race weekend on May 8–9 had been postponed, although the sanctioning body affirmed its commitment to running a full 36-race schedule.
- On April 30, 2020, NASCAR announced a revised schedule for the month of May, with two Cup races at Darlington Raceway and two points-paying races at Charlotte Motor Speedway, including the Coca-Cola 600 that will be run behind closed doors. The Charlotte races, however, began a new policy that track owner Sonic Automotive, parent of Speedway Motorsports, would implement at all events behind closed doors. Owners of condominiums and office space at the respective circuits were allowed to attend the races in their respective buildings, which at Charlotte meant spectators would be allowed in condominiums above Turn 1. Darlington's newly added spring date would become permanent in 2021.
- On May 8, 2020, NASCAR announced that Sonoma Raceway and Chicagoland Speedway would not host Cup races in 2020, and that Richmond Raceway's postponed spring date would not be rescheduled. Eventually, on September 29, 2020, NASCAR closed Chicagoland Speedway.
- On May 14, 2020, NASCAR announced another revised schedule, this time to show the races planned for the end of May through June 21. These tracks include Bristol Motor Speedway, Atlanta Motor Speedway, Martinsville Speedway, Homestead–Miami Speedway, and Talladega Superspeedway. NASCAR also announced a continuation of its empty stands policy for those races. As was the policy in Charlotte, spectators were allowed in Atlanta at the Turn 4 condominiums (a similar rule was used in INDYCAR at Texas for their Turn 2 units). NASCAR invited guests for Homestead, and began limited spectators at Talladega.
- With the exception of the Coca-Cola 600, all races starting with NASCAR's return at Darlington through the Homestead race at minimum will feature no practice or qualifying. Teams will unload, have cars inspected, and race. The Coca-Cola 600 will feature qualifying only a few hours before the race but no practice.
- On July 8, NASCAR announced the next phase of revisions to the schedule through the conclusion of the regular season in August; this includes twin race weekends at Dover and Michigan (with the races shortened to 500 kilometers each), and the Go Bowling at The Glen being replaced by the Daytona Grand Prix — NASCAR's first ever road course race at Daytona International Speedway. It was reported that the replacement of the Watkins Glen race was necessitated by travel restrictions imposed by the state of New York, which currently require 14 days self-isolation for anyone entering the state from areas designated as having large numbers of recent COVID-19 cases (including North Carolina, where the majority of NASCAR teams and staff are based). Fans may be admitted at events on a case-by-case basis depending on local health orders.

==== Xfinity Series ====
- The EchoPark 250 at Atlanta Motor Speedway and the Hooters 250 at Homestead–Miami Speedway were originally announced on March 12, 2020, due to the COVID-19 pandemic to take place without fans in attendance, but one day later on March 13, 2020, NASCAR announced that the two Cup races (including support races) would be postponed.
- On March 16, 2020, NASCAR announced all race events through May 3 were postponed due to the COVID-19 pandemic.
- On April 30, 2020, the sanctioning body announced an updated schedule for the month of May that included Xfinity races at Darlington Raceway and Charlotte Motor Speedway.
- On May 8, 2020, NASCAR announced that Chicagoland Speedway will not host an Xfinity Series race in 2020. A 2nd event at Darlington Raceway will replace the Chicagoland's race. That will be the first time since 2004 that Darlington hosts 2 Xfinity Series events in the same year.
- On May 14, 2020, NASCAR announced that Iowa Speedway will not host an Xfinity Series race in 2020. A second event at Homestead–Miami Speedway will replace the first Iowa's race. That will be the first time ever that Homestead hosts two Xfinity Series events in the same year.
- On May 27, 2020, it was announced that the rescheduled Bristol race, scheduled for Saturday, May 30, would be rescheduled again to Monday, June 1 as a result of the Cup race at Charlotte originally scheduled for May 27 being delayed by a day due to rain. The reason for moving the Xfinity Bristol race was because the NASCAR on Fox TV equipment would not be set up and ready in time.
- The Dash 4 Cash races were supposed to be at Texas Motor Speedway, Bristol Motor Speedway, Talladega Superspeedway and Dover International Speedway, but after all the COVID-19 schedule changes, they changed to Atlanta, Homestead, and Talladega with Bristol now serving as the qualification race for the Dash 4 Cash. Despite being in the middle of the races that do have it, the Saturday Homestead race will not be a Dash 4 Cash race.
- On July 8, 2020, NASCAR announced the series' schedule in the month of August. This included the move of the Watkins Glen race to the Daytona infield road course as a result of failing to get a waiver of Governor Andrew Cuomo's 14 day quarantine rule for anyone entering the state of New York from states that are COVID-19 hot spots, which includes North Carolina, where NASCAR teams are based. In that announcement, it was also made official that the standalone race at Mid-Ohio race would be cancelled and replaced, and the same would go for the June Michigan race, which had been scheduled in June but when the Cup Series races became a doubleheader, the date clashed with Road America, despite being a standalone race.
- On August 6, 2020, NASCAR announced that an additional race at Talladega would replace the cancelled Mid-Ohio race and will be part of the Xfinity Series playoffs. An additional race at Richmond would replace the cancelled Michigan event. In that announcement, it was also revealed that the Xfinity Series playoff opener has been moved to Las Vegas Motor Speedway.

==== Truck Series ====
- On March 12, 2020, it was announced that the Vet Tix/Camping World 200 at Atlanta Motor Speedway and the Baptist Health 200 at Homestead–Miami Speedway would take place without fans in attendance due to the COVID-19 pandemic. However, the following day, NASCAR announced that those races (along with the Cup and Xfinity races on those same weekends, also at Atlanta and Homestead) would be outright postponed instead.
- On March 16, 2020, NASCAR announced all race events through May 3 would be postponed due to the COVID-19 pandemic.
- On May 8, 2020, NASCAR announced that Chicagoland Speedway would not host their Truck race, the Camping World 225, for this season only as part of the COVID-19 schedule changes.
- On May 14, 2020, NASCAR announced that Iowa Speedway would not host a Truck race, the M&M's 200, for this season only as part of the COVID-19 schedule changes.
- On July 8, 2020, NASCAR announced the series' schedule in the month of August. This included the addition of a race at the Daytona infield road course which replaced the cancelled Iowa race. In that announcement, it was also made official that the standalone race at Eldora would be cancelled and replaced and the same would go for the Canadian Tire Motorsport Park playoff race. Gateway remained on the schedule despite being a standalone race. Additionally, because of the loss of these two races, the Gateway race became part of the regular season instead of the first race of the playoffs, and Kansas and Texas will be in the playoffs.
- On August 6, 2020, NASCAR announced that a race at Darlington would replace the cancelled Canadian Tire Motorsports Motorsport Park race and will be part of the regular season. It marks the series’ first event at the historic track in more than nine years. A third race at Kansas would replace the cancelled Eldora event and will be part of the playoffs. In that announcement, it was also revealed that the series’ playoff opener has been moved to Bristol Motor Speedway.

In NASCAR's first races back since the pandemic hit, there would be no practice or qualifying held so that teams would not need to bring additional crew members to the track and would not need to bring backup cars. (Crew members would be in contact with each other when repairing a primary car damaged in practice or qualifying or to prepare a backup car if a team had to utilize it).

In the Gander RV & Outdoors Truck Series and Xfinity Series races that will be held without practice and qualifying, NASCAR announced that the field size temporarily will be expanded to a maximum of 40 vehicles each. The field will be set by a random draw, similar to NASCAR Cup Series.

=== Realignment 2021 ===
==== Cup Series ====
- The Clash will be moved from the Sunday before the Daytona 500 to the Tuesday before (on February 9), in an effort to condense Speedweeks down to one week and also because of Super Bowl LV scheduling in nearby Tampa. The race will also be moved from the oval to the infield road course for the first time. The original intent of the change was a cost savings move to allow sixth-generation chassis for road course events to be used. NASCAR had intended to launch the new seventh-generation chassis from Technique at the Daytona 500, and with an insufficient number of chassis available, teams would use the sixth-generation chassis for the Daytona race. However, because of the pandemic, the release of the new chassis will be delayed to 2022, but the use of a road course chassis would save costs. For reference, there was one crash-related safety car at the Daytona road course round, while at the 2020 Busch Clash, four incidents occurred, each between 3 and 11 cars involved during the event, with only five cars finishing on the lead lap, and the winner, Erik Jones, doing so with a damaged car. The Daytona 500 will be held on Sunday, February 14.
- Phoenix Raceway will host Cup races on March 7 and November 7, the latter being the championship date.
- Nashville Superspeedway will host a Cup race, scheduled for Sunday, June 20 (Father's Day). It will be the first time the speedway will host a NASCAR Cup Series event, and the first time the track has hosted any NASCAR events since 2011. In order to put the track on the schedule, its owner, Dover Motorsports, moved one of their two Cup races at Dover (a track which they also own) to Nashville.
- On September 29, it was reported that Kentucky Speedway and Chicagoland Speedway would not be on the 2021 schedule,
- On September 30, NASCAR announced that Atlanta Motor Speedway would expand to two races, picking up the Quaker State 400 from Kentucky.
- On the same day, Road America was added back to the schedule for the first time since a Grand National race 65 years prior. The race is scheduled for July 4, replacing the race weekend at Indianapolis Motor Speedway.
- With the release of the 2021 schedule, NASCAR announced that its race at Indianapolis would be run on the track's road course configuration.
- The Cup Series will also race on dirt for the first time since 1970 as the spring race at Bristol Motor Speedway will have the concrete half-mile covered in dirt.
- The All-Star Weekend, traditionally held at Charlotte Motor Speedway, moves to Texas Motor Speedway and becomes the last race weekend telecast by NASCAR on Fox. The open weekend has its slot filled by a new race at Circuit of the Americas. As a consequence of gaining the All-Star race, Texas goes down to one points race.

==== Xfinity Series ====
- Circuit of the Americas (in Austin, Texas) is added for the first time.
- Nashville Superspeedway returns for the first time since 2011.
- Auto Club Speedway, Chicagoland Speedway, Iowa Speedway and Kentucky Speedway are removed from the schedule.
  - Auto Club Speedway was initially on the schedule, but was replaced by an event at the Daytona Road Course due to COVID-19 regulations.
- Atlanta and Martinsville will go from hosting one race to two. This is the first time Atlanta has hosted two races, while Martinsville will host two races for the first time since 1994.
- Bristol and Dover will go from having two races on the schedule to one as the Bristol race will be the paved event. (The Xfinity Series will not race on the Bristol dirt weekend.)
- The Darlington (spring) and Talladega (fall) races added during COVID-19 schedule changes will be kept.
- The fall Texas and Kansas weekends swapped spots, with Texas being the Round of 8 opener and Kansas being the middle race.

==== Truck Series ====
There is one less race on the schedule, as it now contains 22 races instead of 23. This is also the first time since 2000 that the Truck Series has had more than one road course race (when Watkins Glen and Portland were on the schedule), and the first time since 1999 that there have been three road courses on the schedule (when it had those two races plus Topeka).

- Eldora Speedway, the series' original dirt race which had been on the schedule since 2013 (except for 2020 when it was removed due to COVID-19), was replaced by a race at Knoxville Raceway in Iowa, home of the Knoxville Nationals, which will be run on Friday, July 9.
- The series has two dirt races for the first time with the addition of a spring race at Bristol, which will see dirt temporarily put onto the track's surface. The Cup Series will also be running with the Truck Series on that weekend. This race replaces the race at Kentucky Speedway, which will not host any NASCAR races in 2021.
- Circuit of the Americas replaces the spring race at Texas, as is the case with the Cup and Xfinity Series. This gives the series a second road course race.
- After a 20-year absence, Watkins Glen returns to the schedule for the first time since 2000, giving the series a third road course race. The race will be in August on the same weekend as the Cup and Xfinity races there. This race replaces the race at Michigan, which will not host a Truck race for the first time since 2001.
- Nashville Superspeedway is added to the schedule, replacing Dover, as is also the case with the Cup and Xfinity Series. This is the first race for the series at Nashville since 2011. The series will not race at Dover at all this season. It is the first time since 1999 where the track has not been on the schedule.
- Iowa Speedway is permanently taken off the schedule after its race on the 2020 schedule was removed as part of the COVID-19 schedule changes.
- Darlington Raceway, which was not originally on the 2020 schedule but added on as part of the COVID-19 schedule changes, becomes a permanent event for the first time since 2011. It will be run on Mother's Day weekend along with the new second race dates for Cup and Xfinity at the track added this year. This race replaces the race at Chicagoland Speedway, which will not host any NASCAR races in 2021.
- Canadian Tire Motorsport Park was initially back on the schedule after being taken off of the 2020 schedule during the season as part of the COVID-19 schedule changes. Due to the continuance of Canadian restrictions, the race was moved to Darlington.
- Homestead–Miami Speedway is being removed in favor of the Daytona road course race. This was made for logistics reasons, as Homestead was moved back a week in order for Daytona's road course to replace the Auto Club Speedway Cup and Xfinity weekend.

=== Realignment 2022 ===
==== Cup Series ====
- Auto Club Speedway returned to the schedule for the first time since 2020 after state COVID-19 regulations in California forced the cancellation of the 2021 race. It was scheduled for the weekend after the Daytona 500 (February 25, 26, and 27), which made it the second race of the season for the first time since 2010, replacing the Daytona Road Course. This was also scheduled to be the last race at the track before its proposed reconfiguration into a short track for 2023, although the project was later put on hold.
- On August 21, 2021, Sports Business Journal reported that NASCAR was in talks to have World Wide Technology Raceway (Gateway) in Madison, Illinois host a Cup Series race in 2022. On September 8, Adam Stern of Sports Business Journal reported that the 2022 schedule to be announced in mid-September would add Gateway and remove one of the Pocono races. This was confirmed on September 14 by The Athletic, with Gateway scheduled on June 5.
- On September 14, 2021, NASCAR announced that the Busch Clash would move to the Los Angeles Memorial Coliseum. The Clash was moved because of a situation that developed with 2021 NFL league year changes (17-game season over 18 weeks moved Super Bowl LVI back one week) announced after the 2022 Daytona 500 date had been announced. They also announced that for the first time since 1989, there will be a Cup race on Easter Sunday. Only one off-week was on the schedule in 2022 (Father's Day due to NBC's Coverage of the 2022 U.S. Open).
- NASCAR also announced that the Dixie Vodka 400 at Homestead–Miami Speedway would be returning to the NASCAR Playoffs for 2022 but not as the final race of the season, as it had been from 2002 through 2019. Instead, Homestead is to join Las Vegas and Martinsville as the tracks composing the Round of 8 in the quest for the championship. In order to make room for Homestead in the Playoff schedule, the Federated Auto Parts 400 at Richmond, which had been run as a Playoffs event since 2018, was rescheduled for August.
- On January 10, 2022, it was announced that the race at Sonoma will go back to using the 1.99 mile club circuit instead of the 2.52 mile full circuit used from 1989 to 1997 and from 2019 to 2021.

==== Xfinty Series ====
- Auto Club Speedway would return to the schedule for the first time in two years as a result of state COVID-19 regulations in California, forcing the cancellation of the 2021 race. It would be scheduled for the weekend after the Daytona 500 (February 25, 26, and 27), making it the second race of the season for the first time since 2010, replacing the Daytona Road Course.
- The major venue change is a swap of Green Savoree Racing Promotions circuits. Mid-Ohio Sports Car Course would lose its date, which would go to Portland International Raceway, which in return Mid-Ohio would be awarded a Camping World Truck Series date. Portland would be the only standalone date for the Xfinity Series in 2022.
- As for other slight realignments, Richmond would go from the late-summer date to the spring date, and Homestead-Miami would go from February to late-October, returning to the playoffs.

==== Truck Series ====
There is one more race on the schedule, as it now contains 23 races instead of 22 from 2021.

- After a 23-year absence, Sonoma returns to the schedule for the first time since 1998 and after a 10-year absence, Lucas Oil Indianapolis Raceway Park also returned to the schedule, becoming a playoff race.
- Mid-Ohio earned a Truck Series race and will host the Truck Series for the first time in series history, after losing their date in Xfinity Series. Kansas also earned a 2nd date permanently, in the playoff, after being added in 2020 as a replacement due to COVID-19 pandemic.
- Homestead Miami returned to the schedule after being removed due to logistical reasons in 2021 after the Auto Club Speedway Cup and Xfinity races were canceled because of state restrictions.
- The two pandemic-related changes midway through the season, the second Daytona International Speedway (road course) and Darlington Raceway (playoff) races, which were added because of pandemic-related restrictions, were removed. NASCAR permanently removed the Canadian Tire Motorsport Park event that had been replaced by Darlington each of the past two seasons.
- Watkins Glen and the 2nd Las Vegas (the playoff one) races were also removed from the schedule permanently.
- As for other slight realignments, Martinsville will go from the fall to the spring date and Richmond will go from the spring to the summer date.

=== Realignment 2023 ===
==== Cup Series ====
- Chicago Street Course
  - After NASCAR used a Chicago Street Course track in the 2021 eNASCAR iRacing Pro Invitational Series, it was speculated that NASCAR would like to make it a reality and have a street race in Chicago on the Cup Series schedule in the future. On July 7, 2022, Jordan Bianchi from The Athletic reported that an official announcement of this being added to the Cup Series schedule would come on July 19. On June 17, Adam Stern from Sports Business Journal suggested that the Chicago Street Course could replace Road America on the 2023 Cup Series schedule as the street race would likely replace one of the road course races and Road America does not have a contract to have a Cup Series race in 2023. Both the addition of the Chicago street race to the schedule and the fact that it would replace the race at Road America came on July 19.
- NASCAR All-Star Race
  - On June 24, 2022, Adam Stern also reported that Fox Sports, which has the TV rights to the All-Star Race, has been trying to convince NASCAR and Speedway Motorsports to move the NASCAR All-Star Race to a different venue each year as is the case in other sports. After the 2022 All-Star Race at Texas Motor Speedway, which was widely considered unpopular and controversial by fans and the industry, the track tweeted that they would be hosting the All-Star Race again in 2023. However, the tweet was deleted amidst negative reactions to the announcement, leading to speculation that plans could change. On September 7, it was revealed that the All-Star race will take place on the renovated North Wilkesboro Speedway. It would be the first NASCAR Cup race on the track since 1996, after its dates were replaced by races at Texas Motor Speedway and New Hampshire Motor Speedway in 1997.
- Autotrader EchoPark Automotive 400
  - On January 2, 2023, thespun.com reported that the Autotrader EchoPark Automotive 500 at Texas Motor Speedway will be reduced to 400 miles. The article states that it is an attempted overall effort by NASCAR to hopefully reduce race times, so that they are closer to 2.5 hours, than the normal 3.5 to 4 hours.
- The Ambetter Health 400 at Atlanta Motor Speedway was likewise shortened from 500 miles for similar reasons.

=== Realignment 2024 ===
==== Cup Series ====
- On November 6, 2022, it was confirmed that 2023 would be the last race on Auto Club Speedway's 2-mile configuration. The track would not be on the 2024 schedule due to being reconfigured into a short track.
- On September 15, 2023, Bristol Motor Speedway announced that the spring Bristol race would return to being run on concrete, having taken place on dirt the prior three seasons. In the same press release, it was confirmed that Bristol would continue to have two race dates; the spring race reverted back to its old Food City 500 name due to the return to concrete.
- On September 28, 2023, Indianapolis Motor Speedway announced that the Cup Series would return to the oval layout in 2024, in time to commemorate the 30th anniversary of the Brickyard 400. The track hosted NASCAR since 1994 and used the oval layout until 2020. From 2021 to 2023, the Cup Series used the grand prix circuit layout.
- On October 2, 2023, Fox Sports and The Athletic reported that Iowa Speedway was expected to receive a NASCAR Cup Series race in 2024, replacing the race at Auto Club Speedway. A press conference by Iowa Governor Kim Reynolds was held on October 3, where she and NASCAR officially announced the inaugural Cup Series race at Iowa Speedway on June 16.
- The Cup Series took a two-week hiatus between the Brickyard 400 and the Cook Out 400, as NBC covered the 2024 Summer Olympics.

=== Realignment 2025 ===
==== Cup Series ====
- The Quaker State 400 at Atlanta Motor Speedway was the opening race for the new NASCAR In-Season Challenge.
- The Cook Out Clash moved to Bowman Gray Stadium in 2025, replacing the Los Angeles Memorial Coliseum. It was the first NASCAR Cup Series race held at the track since 1971.
- Autódromo Hermanos Rodríguez hosted a points paying race, becoming the first points paying Cup race outside the US since 1958. Richmond Raceway lost a date to accommodate this change.
- The races at World Wide Technology Raceway, New Hampshire Motor Speedway, and the Southern 500 at Darlington Raceway, was added to the playoff schedule. As part of this schedule change, Watkins Glen International, Homestead–Miami Speedway, and the Quaker State 400 at Atlanta Motor Speedway, moved to the regular season.
- Easter Sunday was a bye week for the first time since 2021, it has been placed between the Food City 500 and the Jack Link's 500.
- The Race at Circuit of the Americas was on a 2.4-mile layout instead of the 3.4-mile layout.

==== Xfinty Series ====
- The series returned to Autódromo Hermanos Rodríguez for the first time since the 2008 Corona Mexico 200.
- Rockingham Speedway returned to the series for the first time since 2004.
- Gateway returned to the series after a 14-year absence.
- Bristol earned a second date, while Michigan, New Hampshire and Richmond are removed from the Xfinity series' schedule, and Darlington loses its second date, albeit in a one-year only situation.

==== Truck Series ====
The schedule has 25 races for the first time since 2011. With the season-finale at Phoenix being on October 31, the season will finish in the month of October for the first time since 2000.

- Added races
  - Rockingham is on the schedule for the first time since 2013.
  - Michigan is on the schedule for the first time since 2020.
  - Lime Rock Park, a road course in Connecticut, is on the Truck Series schedule for the first time.
  - Watkins Glen is on the schedule for the first time since 2021 and for only the second time since 2000.
  - New Hampshire is on the schedule for the first time since 2017.
  - The Charlotte Roval will have a Truck Series race for the first time.
- Removed races
  - Circuit of the Americas will not be on the schedule in 2025. It is the first time since NASCAR started racing there in 2021 that the track will not have a Truck Series race.
  - Gateway will not be on the schedule for the first time since 2013.
  - Milwaukee will not be on the schedule for the first time since 2022.
  - The fall race at Kansas was taken off the schedule. The track will have only one Truck Series race for the first time since 2021.
- Date changes
  - Homestead–Miami moves from October to March.
  - Nashville moves from June to May.
  - Pocono moves from July to June.
  - The race at Darlington moves from May to Labor Day weekend and will be run on the same weekend as the Cup Series' Southern 500 instead of on the track's spring Cup Series race weekend.

=== Realignment 2026 ===
==== Cup Series ====
- Homestead–Miami Speedway will return to its traditional date as the season finale for all three major series. To accommodate this change, New Hampshire Motor Speedway will be removed from the playoffs.
- Chicago Street Course announced that the Grant Park 165 will not return in 2026.
- The Cup Series will return to Southern California with a street race at Naval Base Coronado near San Diego. To accommodate this change, Mexico City was dropped from the schedule due to a conflict with the 2026 FIFA World Cup.
- The NASCAR All-Star Race will be moved from North Wilkesboro Speedway to Dover Motor Speedway, giving the former a points race, the first regular-season race held there since 1996.
- Chicagoland Speedway will return to the schedule for the first time since 2019.

=== O'Reilly Auto Parts Series ===
- Homestead–Miami Speedway will return to its traditional date as the finale for all three national series.
- The series will join the Craftsman Truck Series and the Cup Series at the Coronado Street Course.
- The series will not return to Portland International Raceway, Chicago Street Course, and Autódromo Hermanos Rodríguez for the first time since 2021, 2022, and 2025, respectively.
- The series will return to Chicagoland Speedway for the first time since 2019, and the second Darlington race was readded after a one-year hiatus.

=== Truck Series ===
- The series will race at the St. Petersburg street circuit and the Coronado Street Course for the first time.
- The series will not race at the Las Vegas Motor Speedway for the first time since the series inception in 1995.
- Homestead–Miami Speedway will return to being the season finale for all three national series.
- The series will return to Dover Motor Speedway for the first time since 2020.
